= Soling World Trophy =

Since 1985 the International Soling Association (ISA) keeps record of the annual International Soling Ranking. A few years the ranking list of the IYRU/ISAF was used. After the 2000 Olympics the system was changed to an individual ranking system so that the trophy can be won by one or more individual crewmembers, regardless the role of the crewmember, or by one or more teams. The winner receives the Soling World Trophy.

Year	Country	Sailors	Note
1985	United States	William Baylis, Robert Billingham, John Kostecki	
1986	East Germany	Thomas Flach, Bernd Jäkel, Jochen Schümann	
1987	Soviet Union	Sergey Kanov, Nikolai Poliakov, Georgy Shayduko	
1988	United States	William Baylis, Robert Billingham, John Kostecki	
1989	East Germany	Thomas Flach, Bernd Jäkel, Jochen Schümann	
1990	East Germany	Sven Diedering, Norbert Hellriegel, Helmar Nauck	
1991	East Germany	Thomas Flach, Bernd Jäkel, Jochen Schümann	
1992	Denmark	Jesper Bank, Steen Secher, Jesper Seier	
1993	Germany	Albert Batzill, Peter Lang, Eddy Eich	
1994	Sweden	Per Ahlby, Stefan Nordstrom, Tony Lundberg	
1995	Sweden	Björn Alm, Johan Barne, Magnus Holmberg	
1996	Germany	Thomas Flach, Bernd Jäkel, Jochen Schümann	
1997	Russia	Georgy Shayduko, Igor Skalin, Sergei Volchkov	
1998	Ukraine	Serhiy Pichuhin, Volodymyr Korotkov, Sergiy Timokhov	
1999	Netherlands	Roy Heiner, Peter van Niekerk, Dirk de Ridder	
2000	Germany	Gunnar Bahr, Ingo Borkowski, Jochen Schümann	
2001	No ranking system in place		
2002	Austria	Carl Auteried Jr., Thomas Beclin, Martin Kendler	
2002	Germany	Roman Koch	
2003	Hungary	Gyenese Balazs, Monus Gyula, Károly Vezér	European winners
2003	Brazil	George Nehm, Marcos Ribeiro, Lucio Ribeiro	South American winners
2003	United States	Stuart H. Walker	North American winner
2004	Hungary	László Kovácsi, Pepe Németh, György Wossala	
2005	Germany	Maxl Koch	
2006	Germany	Roman Koch	
2007	Hungary	Pepe Németh, György Wossala	
2008	Hungary	Károly Vezér, György Wossala	
2009	Germany	Maxl Koch, Roman Koch	
2010	Germany	Maxl Koch, Roman Koch	
2011	Germany	Karl Haist	
2012	Hungary	György Wossala	
2013	Canada	Peter Hall	
2014	Canada	Peter Hall, Will Hall	
2015	Hungary	Károly Vezér	
2016	Canada	Peter Hall	
2017	Ukraine	Serhiy Pichuhin, Igor Yushko, Igor Severianov	
2018	Hungary	Sándor Varjas	
2019	Austria	Martin Zeileis	
2020	No ranking due to COVID-19		
2021	Austria	Martin Zeileis	
2022	Austria	Martin Zeileis	

== Country ranking (1985–present) ==
The following table shows the countries in order of number of times winning the ranking list.

Ranking	Country	Winning
1	Germany	8
2	Hungary	7
3	Austria	4
3	East Germany	4
4	Canada	3
4	United States	3
7	Sweden	2
7	Ukraine	2
9	Brazil	1
9	Denmark	1
9	Netherlands	1
9	Russia	1
9	Soviet Union	1
