= Soling =

International racing sailing class

International Soling
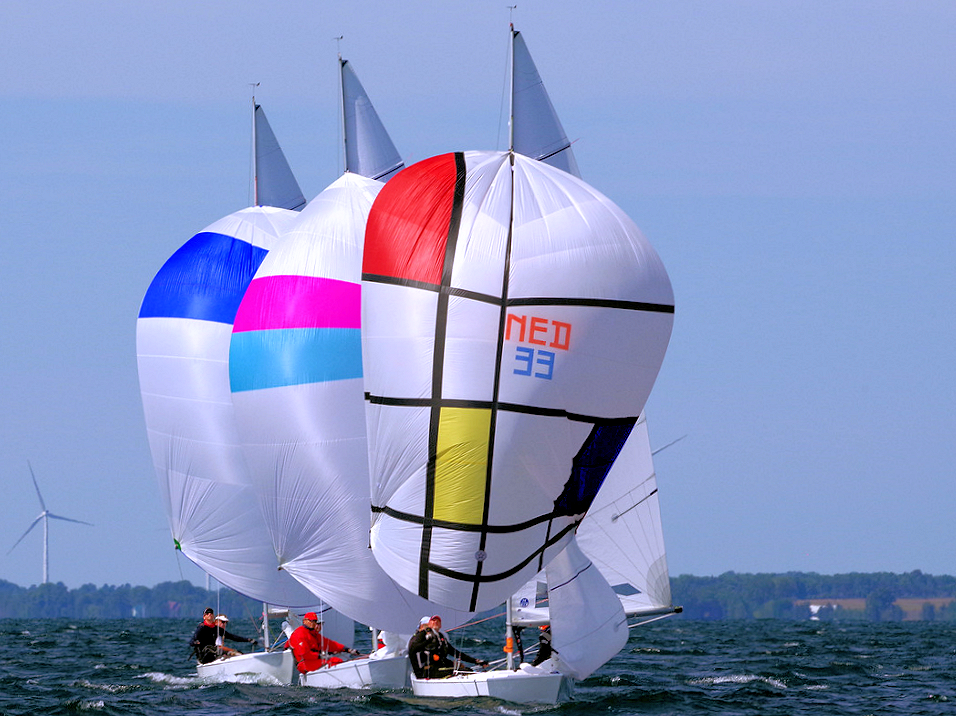
- Solings downwind during the 2019 North American Soling Championship Kingston, Ontario

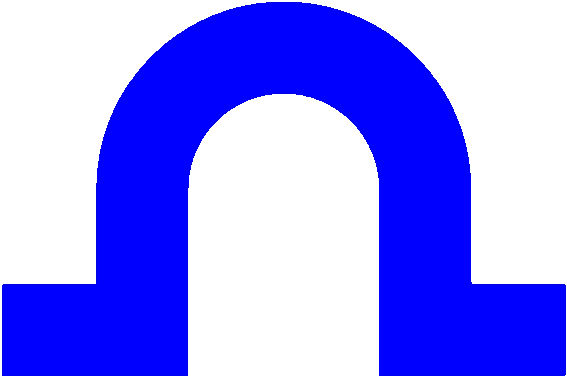

Development
- Designer: LINGE-DESIGN, Jan Herman LingeA/S
- Location: Oslo, Norway
- Year: 1964
- No. built: 3441 registered (about 4500 build, last WS serial number 2554)
- Design: One-Design
- Brand: World Sailing
- Builders: over the years per country: (Australia) Rudder Yachts ltd.; (Australia) Halvorsen, Morson & Gawland ltd.; (Australia) Pamcraft ltd.; (Canada) Abbott Boats ltd.; (Denmark) Elvstrøm Boats A/S; (Denmark) A/S Borresens Baadebyggeri; (Spain) Playvisa; (Finland) Vamos; (Finland) Veneva O/Y; (France) Dufour; (France) Fontaine-Pajot; (West Germany) Norddeutsche Sportbootwerft; (West Germany) Bootswerft Leonard Mader GbR.; (United Kingdom) Tyler Boat Co.; (United Kingdom) Petticrow Boatyard; (United Kingdom) Petticrows Boatyard; (Germany) Hartra; (Hungary) Crane Works; (Italy) C.I.M.A.; (Italy) Bianchi & Cecchi; (Japan) Ishihara Dockyard Comp.; (Mexico) Ferro; (Netherlands) H.V.M. NV; (Norway) Soling Yachts A/S; (Norway) Jan H. Linge A/S; (New Zealand) RNYS; (New Zealand) Jim MacKay Boats ltd.; (New Zealand) T.P. Cookson; (Poland) Gdansk Ship and Yacht Yard; (South Africa) Proderite ltd.; (Switzerland) Polyform; (Soviet Union) Licencintorg; (United States) Gemico Corporation (O'day); (United States) Plastrend Corporation; (United States) Gemico-Marlow; (United States) Eichenlaub Boat Comp.; Most registered boats built by Abbott, Borresens and Elvstrøm.
- Role: Open keelboat designed for Olympic/International regatta sailing. Also very suitable for recreational (regatta) sailing.

Boat
- Crew: 2 or 3
- Displacement: Min: 1,035 kg (2,282 lb)
- Draft: 1.30 m (4.3 ft)
- Trapeze: Droop hiking

Hull
- General: 8.185 m (26.85 ft)
- Type: Monohull
- Construction: Fiberglass
- Hull weight: Min: 1,035 kg (2,282 lb)
- LOA: Min: 8.170 m (26.80 ft); Max: 8.200 m (26.90 ft)
- LWL: 6.10 m (20.0 ft)
- Beam: 1.90 m (6.2 ft)
- Engine: None

Hull appendages
- General: Keel, Rudder
- Keel: Fixed keel
- Ballast: Min: 570 kg (1,260 lb); Max: 590 kg (1,300 lb)
- Rudder: Balanced spade

Rig
- General: Bermuda rig with high aspect ratio jib
- Rig type: Aluminum or Carbon fiber
- Mast height: From deck: 9.2 m (30 ft)
- Rig other: Genoa's and Gennaker's are no part of the sail inventory

Sails
- General: Sails shall be constructed only of woven of fibers. Fibers other than those of polyester and non-aromatic polyamide are prohibited.
- Sailplan: Sloop
- Mainsail area: 15.6 m^{2} (168 sq ft)
- Jib/genoa area: 8.1 m^{2} (87 sq ft)
- Spinnaker area: Max: 45.0 m^{2} (484 sq ft); Min: 35.0 m^{2} (377 sq ft)
- Upwind sail area: 23.7 m^{2} (255 sq ft)
- Downwind sail area: Max: 60.6 m^{2} (652 sq ft); Min: 50.6 m^{2} (545 sq ft)
- Total sail area: 68.7 m^{2} (739 sq ft)

Racing
- Class association: International Soling Association

Rating
- D-PN: 82.3
- RYA PN: 914
- PHRF: 150 Lake Ontario

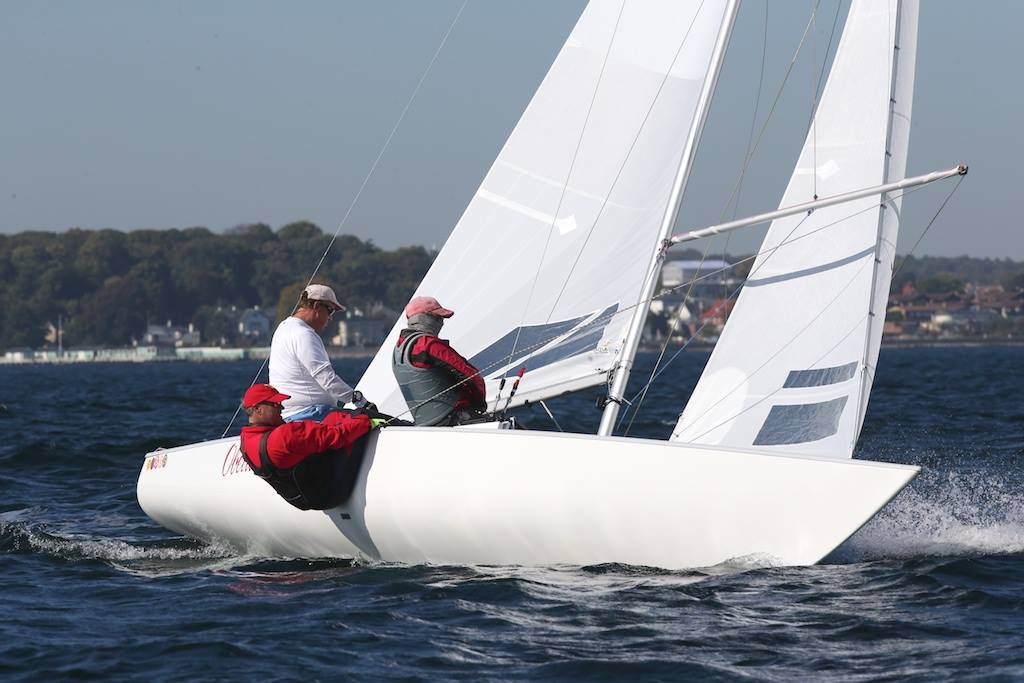
Droop-hiking technique demonstrated by middleman.

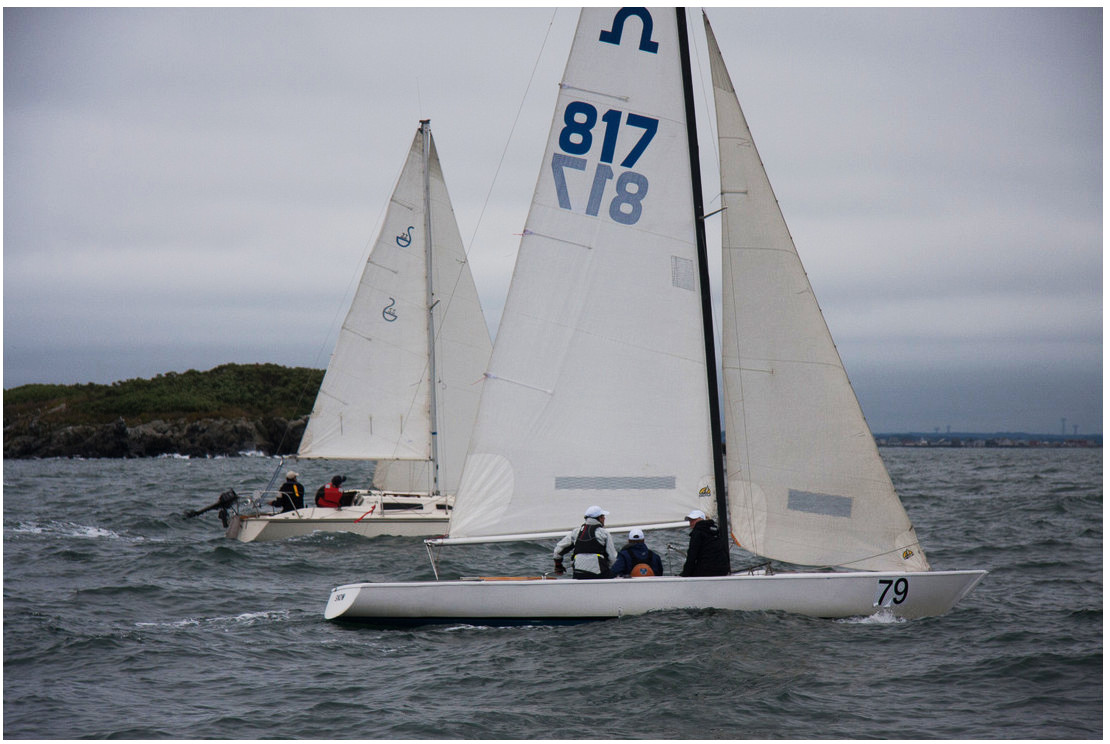
Soling in the Boston Harbor Island Race 2012

The Soling is an open keelboat that holds the World Sailing "International class" status. The class is managed by the International Soling Association under the auspices of World Sailing since 1968. It was used at the Summer Olympics from 1972 until 2000 as the open three-person keelboat. Besides the Olympic career of the Soling, the boat is used for international and local regattas as well as for recreational sailing.

The Soling is a strong boat designed for any wind and sea condition by Jan Herman Linge from Norway in 1964. The boats are one-design originating from an authorized single plug and mould system and made of fiberglass. This together with a strict set of class rules makes competition possible on a "level playing field". Solings last a long time, and boats produced in the early days are still in competition today (more than 50 years after being built). At the 2019 North American Championship the fifth place was taken by the German team sailing a refurbished Soling which had been built in 1968. A characteristic sailing style for the Soling is the droop-hiking technique.

== History ==
=== 1961: IYRU seeks new classes as companion/complement for the Olympic classes ===
The search was for four classes:

- A companion class for the Finn
- A complementary class to the Star
- A complementary class to the 5.5 Metre and Dragon
- A catamaran

=== 1963: Announcement from The Class Policy Committee of the IYRU ===
After the announcement, Yachting started to gather design sketches for a three persons keelboat to be used in a presentation at the November IYRU meeting. Specs were not explicitly given however the boat should be a "wholesome boat capable of being sailed from port to port in open water". What IYRU wants is a nice compromise between maximum speed and maximum seaworthiness stated Yachting. The design of the Soling was made.

=== 1965: A prototype of the Soling was ready and tested ===
After Jan Herman Linge and Finn Ferner were satisfied with the prototype (in wood) it was transformed into a plug to create a mould for production in fiberglass. At the IYRU November meeting trials for a new 3 persons keelboat were scheduled for 1966. During the winter of 1965/66 the first five fiberglass Soling's were built by Linge.

=== 1966: 1st Trials at Kiel ===
Spring was used to test the five Solings. The trials were set for Kiel specially to test and compare the entries in heavy weather. The most races were won by a wooden Shillalah. After the trials two entries were recommended by the judges, The Shillalah and, shorter than all other competitor, the Soling. In November the IYRU decided that further trials would be held in Travemünde the following year.

=== 1967: 2nd Trials at Travemünde ===
Some sixty boats were produced, sold and sailed in Scandinavia as a local class even before the trials took place. Trials were held with some new boats, a fiberglass Shillalah II and the Soling plus a Dragon and 5.5 Metre for speed reference. After the trials the Soling alone was recommended to the IYRU. This passed through IYRY unanimously in November and the Soling became an International class. In 1974 Shillalah II also got the International class status. Licensed builders were attracted. The International Soling Association (ISA) was established. The first president of the ISA became Eggert Benzon from Denmark.

=== 1968: Olympic class ===
The Olympic status for the Soling arrived after the 1968 Olympics. IYRU decided that the 5.5 Metre had to make place for the Soling in the 1972 Olympics. Meanwhile, over 300 Solings were built in Norway, Denmark, the United States and Canada and more countries would follow. The first Soling European Championship was held in Skovshoved, Denmark and won by the team of Per Spelling from Norway. 75 sailors in 25 Solings did compete.

=== 1969 – 1972: Solings first Olympiad ===
In this period the first Soling World Championship was held in 1969 in which 87 boats participated off the coast of Copenhagen, and won by the team of Paul Elvstrøm, Niels Jensen and Poul Mik-Meyer. The team had put a lot of systems and hiking gear into their boat to make it sail faster. One of the techniques was the installation of a double bottom. This in combination with bailers made the boat self-bailing. This construction however was not legal. Before the first race of the Worlds holes had to be made into the raised floor to take away the unfair advantage. Later that year changes were made to the class rules so that racing floors/double bottoms, or as they are called officially "Cockpit Soles" became legal. The first winners of an Olympic Soling gold medal, Buddy Melges, Bill Allen and Bill Bentsen from the United States made the boat "Simple" by putting a lot of the systems below deck and removing the winches and shroud tracks. Also the first North American Championship was held on Lake Michigan in front of Milwaukee. 108 sailors in 38 Solings did compete. This event was won by the team of John Dane III, Mark LeBlanc and John Cerise. At the 1972 November meeting of the IYRU the Soling was appointed as Olympic class for the 1976 Olympics.

=== 1973 – 1976: Solings 2nd Olympiad ===
Early 1972 Jack van Dyke from the United States became president of the ISA and he made sure that the Soling construction became under control (a serial number was issued by IYRU (now World Sailing)). Then improvements were introduced one by one like hiking vests, mast steps rudders watertight compartments. The Soling became even more a one-design class. 1973 was crucial for the Soling in this respect. Poul Richard Høj Jensen, Valdemar Bandolowski and Erik Hansen from Denmark took the Gold medal during the 1976 Olympics in Kingston, Ontario. Over 2000 boats were built worldwide. Also due to the progression of the Soling the class was appointed as the Olympic three persons boat for the 1980 Olympics.

=== 1977 – 1980: Solings 3rd Olympiad ===
The Numbers of build Solings stayed high under the presidency of Geert Bakker, the Netherlands. Due to the high level of National and local competition the Battle for Olympic selection became more and more intense. This meant that rules were implemented for World and continental championships to keep the large fleet events fair. The introduction of gate starts, and black flag procedures were lined out, tested and implemented. Ken Berkeley introduced match racing in the Soling. Poul Richard Høj Jensen, Valdemar Bandolowski and Erik Hansen, this time sailing under the flag of the IOC, became the 1980 Olympic Champions. The 1980 Summer Olympics were heavily hit by the 1980 Summer Olympics boycott. The Soling was prolongated as the Olympic three persons boat for the 1984 Olympics.

=== 1981 – 1984: Solings 4th Olympiad ===
Ken Berkeley, Australia took the role as ISA president in 1980. Most new boats were now built by Abbott Boats and Elvstrøm/Borresens Baadebyggeri with a few but fast exceptions from Bianchi & Cecchi and Bootswerft Leonard Mader. Major champions were held in North America, Europe and Australia. The level of competition remained very high. In 1983 Karl Haist from Germany became president of the ISA. The 1984 Olympics in Los Angeles, United States were won by the team of Robbie Haines, Ed Trevelyan and Rod Davis from the United States. This event was struck by the 1984 Summer Olympics boycott. Again, the Soling kept its Olympic status for the 1988 Olympics.

=== 1985 – 1988: Solings 5th Olympiad ===
Karl Haist had two major objectives for his presidency: First he wanted a large Soling event in Eastern Europe. He succeeded in this by having the 1985 Soling European Championship held in Balatonfüred, Hungary and the 1986 Europeans in Warnemünde, East-Germany. The second objective, bringing the operational cost of the Soling down by reducing the number of sails during a championship, took more time. This rule was effectuated in March 1989. This rule change reduced the number of mainsails from 2 to 1 and the number of large spinnakers also back from 2 to 1. Shroud tracks were re-introduced on Solings. The 1988 Olympics were held in Busan, Korea. The Gold medals were won by the East Germany team of Jochen Schümann, Thomas Flach and Bernd Jäkel. The Soling status was prolonged as for the 1992 Olympics as the Fleet/Match racing class. In 1987 Sam Merrick became president of the ISA. In this period much was dune to make the Soling more unsinkable by Uli Strohschneider from Austria.

=== 1989 – 1992: Solings 6th Olympiad ===
This period started with a failed World Championship. This was sailed in Balatonfüred, Hungary. On the first day there were heavy winds (up to 100 km/h), specially during the starting procedure. Out of 73 starters 43 made it to the first mark and only 29 boats made it to the finish! Many masts broke. NO BOATS SUNK!!!! in these extreme conditions. The next days there was hardly any wind. Only 4 races were completed, five are needed to constitute a championship. Sam Merrick was elected president in 1987. He made sure that although Match racing was introduced for the 1992 Olympics Fleet racing remained paramount so the Fleet/Match race was introduced at the 1992 Olympics. Gold was won by the Danish team of Jesper Bank, Jesper Seier and Steen Secher. This Fleet/Match race event was successful and so the Soling remained an Olympic class for another 4 years. Stuart Walker became president in 1991.

=== 1993 – 1996: Solings 7th Olympiad ===
The Soling made the choice to introduce the "Pumping rule" as safety measure. This meant in general that the spinnaker guy could be pumped unlimited. President Stuart H. Walker did a lot of work to keep the number of teams in the Match race phase of the Olympics to six thus keeping Fleet racing paramount. The German team of Jochen Schüman, Thomas Flach and Bernd Jäkel won their second gold medal in the Soling during the 1996 Olympics. The Olympic status was prolonged to 2000.

=== 1997 – 2000: Solings 8th Olympiad ===
György Wossala, Hungary became ISA president in 1995. The 1997 Worlds in Rungsted, Denmark did not produce enough races to constitute a valid championship due to weather conditions. Thunderstorms and large periods with no wind at all made it for the race organization impossible to get five race in. The sail plan of the Soling was modified on two points. The tolerances of the mini spinnaker were enlarged so that a more useful spinnaker could be created. Also, the top batten of the mainsail was lengthened so that profile of the top in the main could be better controlled and the lifetime of the sail was improved. Both improvements were initiated by Paul Davis. ISAF wanted to make Match racing more and more important at the Olympics. So for the 2000 Olympics only 16 Solings were eligible to compete in the Fleet race phase and 12 of them would move on to the Match race phase. The spectacular, popular and many times viewed finals were between the teams of Germany and Denmark. Both teams did barely make it into the Match race phase (resp. 10 and 12 place in the Fleet race phase). Finally the Danish team of Jesper Bank, Henrik Blakskjær and Thomas Jacobsen took the gold medal. During the ISAF 2000 mid-year it was decided that the Fleet/Match race event was prolonged for another four years. However, during the ISAF 2000 November meeting, the Soling was NOT re-elected as an Olympic class. There was no match racing on the Olympic agenda anymore until 2012 Olympics. In 1999 Tony Clare, Great Britain became president of the ISA.

=== 2001 – 2006: Post-Olympic ===
However, despite the publicity that was generated for the Olympic sailing event by the fleet/Match race event it disappeared from the Olympic agenda for 2004. And the Soling had to face the fact that many of her top sailors had disappeared to other Olympic disciplines or had quit sailing in general within a few months. Another setback of the class was that Tony Clare was severely injured during a horseback riding incident. Rose Hoeksema, United States took over as president and did a good job of holding the International and National Soling sailors within the class as well as possible. Worlds and continental events were organized as usual and with sufficient participation. The third disaster struck in 2006 when the Abbott Boats ltd. Sarnia, Canada went up in flames. Borresens Baadebyggeri Denmark however started to build boats in a joint venture in Argentina to build Solings.

=== 2007 – 2015: Solid International class ===
Johan Offermans, The Netherlands became president for an unprecedented 7 years. During his presidency he provided stimulation to pick up International travel again. Also, the preparations for the 50th anniversary of the class were started. Jan Herman Linge died at the age of 85 in Asker, Norway. In 2014 Peter Hall took over the presidency. The 50th anniversary of the class was celebrated during the 2015 World Championship in Castiglione della Pescaia, Italy. Over 135 competitors were present from 14 countries and three continents. The first production Soling "N 1" was on display at the harbor site. Soling production was renewed at the Petticrows Boatyard, United Kingdom.

=== 2016 – Now: Introduction on carbon spars ===
In 2017 Michael Dietzel was elected president of the ISA. In 2017 it became clear that there were no longer vendors of suitable aluminum Soling spars any more world wide. Han van Veen, The Netherlands, created and executed a plan to introduce Carbon spars for the Soling. The objective was that the new masts would be cheaper and not lighter or faster than the aluminum masts. The first masts were produced by Ceilidh in The Netherlands and tested in 2018 they proved to be cheaper and equal to the original masts. The one-design of the Soling remain intact. The new mast were approved by World Sailing in 2019. In 2020 the Carbon boom and spinnaker pole were approved as well. In 2020 the Soling North American Championship in Annapolis, United States, the Friendship League Championship in Brazil and many other Soling regatta's world wide were postponed due to COVID-19.

== Solings built ==
Over the years about 4500 Solings were built. About 3700 of them were registered and 2554 were issued with the IYRU-ISAF-WS serial number. The growth in the late 1960s and early 1970s was high before stabilizing in the 80s and 90s. Since 2000 very few boats have been built.

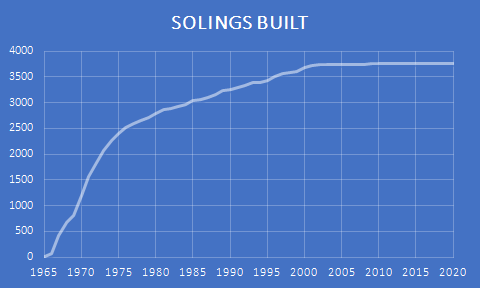
Soling Built between 1965 and 2023

Over the years the following 36 boat builders in 21 countries have been licensed to build Solings:

Australia	Canada	Denmark	Spain	Finland	France	West Germany	Great Britain	East Germany	Hungary	Italy
AUS: Halvorsen, Morson & Gawland ltd.; Pamcraft ltd.; Rudder Yachts ltd.	CAN: Abbott Boats ltd.	DEN: A/S Borresens Baadebyggeri; Elvstrøm Boats A/S	ESP: Playvisa	FIN: Vamos; Veneva O/Y	FRA: Dufour; Fontaine-Pajot	FRG: Bootswerft Leonard Mader GbR.; Norddeutsche Sportbootwerft	GBR: Petticrow Boatyard; Petticrows Boatyard; Tyler Boat Co.	GDR: Hartra	HUN: Crane Works	ITA: Bianchi & Cecchi; C.I.M.A.
Japan	Mexico	Netherlands	Norway	New Zealand	Poland	South Africa	Switzerland	Soviet Union	United States	
JPN: Ishihara Dockyard Comp.	MEX: Ferro	NED: H.V.M. NV	NOR: Jan H. Linge A/S; Soling Yachts A/S	NZL: Jim MacKay Boats ltd.; RNYS; T.P. Cookson	POL: Gdansk Ship and Yacht Yard	RSA: Proderite ltd.	SUI: Polyform	URS: Licencintorg	USA: Eichenlaub Boat Comp.; Gemico Corporation (O'day); Gemico-Marlow; Plastrend Corporation	

== Results of the major Soling regattas ==
=== Games ===
==== Olympic Games ====
Year	Gold	Silver	Bronze
1972 Kiel	United States; Buddy Melges; William Allen; William Bentsen	Sweden; Stig Wennerström; Stefan Krook; Lennart Roslund Race 1 - 4 Bo Knape Race 5 & 6	Canada; David Miller; Paul Côté; John Ekels
1976 Kingston	Denmark; Poul Richard Høj Jensen; Valdemar Bandolowski; Erik Hansen	United States; John Kolius; Walter Glasgow; Richard Hoepfner	East Germany; Dieter Below; Olaf Engelhardt; Michael Zachries
1980 Tallinn	Denmark; Poul Richard Høj Jensen; Valdemar Bandolowski; Erik Hansen	Soviet Union; Boris Budnikov; Aleksandr Budnikov; Nikolay Polyakov	Greece; Tassos Boudouris; Anastasios Gavrilis; Aristidis Rapanakis
1984 Los Angeles	United States; Robbie Haines; Ed Trevalyan; Rod Davis	Brazil; Torben Grael; Daniel Adler; Ronaldo Senfft	Canada; Hans Fogh; Steve Calder; John Kerr
1988 Busan	East Germany; Jochen Schümann; Thomas Flach; Bernd Jäkel	United States; John Kostecki; Bob Billingham; William Baylis	Denmark; Jesper Bank; Jan Mathiasen; Steen Secher
1992 Barcelona	Denmark; Jesper Bank; Jesper Seier; Steen Secher	United States; Kevin Mahaney; Jim Brady; Doug Kern	Great Britain; Lawrie Smith; Robert Cruikshank; Ossie Stewart
1996 Savannah	Germany; Jochen Schümann; Thomas Flach; Bernd Jäkel	Russia; Georgy Shayduko; Dmitry Shabanov; Igor Skalin	United States; Jeff Madrigali; Jim Barton; Kent Massey
2000 Sydney	Denmark; Jesper Bank; Henrik Blakskjær; Thomas Jacobsen	Germany; Jochen Schümann; Gunnar Bahr; Ingo Borkowski	Norway; Herman Horn Johannessen; Paul Davis; Espen Stokkeland

Medal tally
Rank	Nation	Gold	Silver	Bronze	Total
1	Denmark	4	0	1	5
2	United States	2	3	1	6
3	Germany	1	1	0	2
4	East Germany	1	0	1	2
5	Brazil	0	1	0	1
5	Russia	0	1	0	1
5	Soviet Union	0	1	0	1
5	Sweden	0	1	0	1
9	Canada	0	0	2	2
10	Great Britain	0	0	1	1
10	Greece	0	0	1	1
10	Norway	0	0	1	1
Totals (12 entries)		8	8	8	24

==== Pan American Games ====
Event	Gold	Silver	Bronze
1979 San Juan (Puerto Rico)	United States; Dave Curtis; David Barton; Jamie McCreary	Brazil; Eduardo Ramos	Canada; Jim Beatty
1983 Caracas (Venezuela)	Brazil; Torben Grael	Canada; Bill Abbott Jr.	United States; Dave Perry
1987 Indianapolis (United States)	United States	Canada	Brazil

Rank	Nation	Gold	Silver	Bronze	Total
1	United States (USA)	2	0	1	3
2	Brazil (BRA)	1	1	1	3
3	Canada (CAN)	0	2	1	3
Totals (3 entries)		3	3	3	9

==== Vintage Yachting Games ====
Event	Gold	Silver	Bronze
2008 Medemblik (Netherlands)	NED; Rudy den Outer; Leo Determan; Ronald den Arend	Wildcard (NED); Steven Bakker; Sven Coster Race 1–3; Dick Coster Race 4–6; Joost Houweling	GER; Holger Weichert; Laurent Scheel; Martin Setzkorn
2012 Bellano (Italy)	UKR; Igor Yushko; Serhiy Pichuhin; Dmitriy Yarmolenka	NED; Rudy den Outer; Gavin Lidlow; Ramzi Souli	AUT; Peter Neumann; Rudolf Rager; Rudolf Hubauer
2018 Hellerup (Denmark)	NED; Rudy den Outer; Theo de Lange; Gabor Helmhout	CAN; Peter Hall; Johan Offermans (Netherlands); Gord de Vries	UKR; Igor Yushko; Serhiy Pichuhin; Serhiy Ivansits

Rank	Nation	Gold	Silver	Bronze	Total
1	Netherlands (NED)	2	2	0	4
2	Ukraine (UKR)	1	0	1	2
3	Canada (CAN)	0	1	0	1
4	Austria (AUT)	0	0	1	1
4	Germany (GER)	0	0	1	1
Totals (5 entries)		3	3	3	9

=== International ISA Trophies ===
==== World Championships ====
===== Fleet racing =====
Source:

===== Match racing (Infanta Cristina) =====
Event	Gold	Silver	Bronze
1992 Cádiz (Spain)	USA; Kevin Mahaney; Jim Brady; Doug Kern	Not documented	Not documented
1993 Palaio Faliro (Greece)	USA; Larry Klein; Wally Corwin; Steve Burns	Not documented	Not documented
1994 Vallensbæk (Denmark)	SWE; Per Ahlby; Stefan Nordstrom; Tony Lundberg	Not documented	Not documented
1995 Kingston (Canada)	GBR; Stuart Childerley; Tim Powell; Jeremy Fanstone	NOR; Herman Horn Johannessen; Paul Davis; Espen Stokkeland	DEN; Stig Westergaard; Jens Bojsen Møller; Bjørn Westergaard
1996 Cádiz (Spain)	SWE; Magnus Holmberg; Björn Alm; Johan Barne	DEN; Stig Westergaard; Jens Bojsen-Møller; Bjørn Westergaard	FRA; Marc Bouet; Gildas Morvan; Sylvain Chtounder
1997	AUS; Neville Wittey; Josh Grace; David Edwards	Not documented	Not documented
1998 Kralingen (Netherlands)	GER; Jochen Schümann; Gunnar Bahr; Ingo Borkowski	NOR; Herman Horn Johannessen; Paul Davis; Espen Stokkeland	AUS; Neville Wittey; Josh Grace; David Edwards
1999 Melbourne (Australia)	SWE; Hans Wallén; Magnus Augustson; Johan Barne	USA; Jeff Madrigali; Hartwell Jordan; Craig Healy	NED; Roy Heiner; Peter Van Niekerk; Dirk de Ridder
2000 Cádiz (Spain)	DEN; Jesper Bank; Henrik Blakskjær; Thomas Jacobsen	FRA; Philippe Presti; Pascal Rambeau; Jean-Marie Dauris	GBR; Andy Beadsworth; Barry Parkin; Mason

Rank	Nation	Gold	Silver	Bronze	Total
1	Sweden (SWE)	3	0	0	3
2	United States (USA)	2	1	0	3
3	Denmark (DEN)	1	1	1	3
4	Great Britain (GBR)	1	0	1	2
5	Germany (GER)	1	0	0	1
6	Norway (NOR)	0	2	0	2
7	France (FRA)	0	1	1	2
8	Australia (AUS)	0	0	1	1
8	Netherlands (NED)	0	0	1	1
Totals (9 entries)		8	5	5	18

==== Continental Championships ====
===== Australian Championships =====
Year	Gold	Silver	Bronze
1969/70 Not documented	Australia; C. Ryves; Crew not documented	Not documented	Not documented
1970/71 Not documented	Great Britain; Rodney Pattisson; Crew not documented	Not documented	Not documented
1971/72 Not documented	Australia; Robert Miller; Crew not documented	Not documented	Not documented
1972/73 Not documented	Australia; John Bertrand; Crew not documented	Not documented	Not documented
1973/74 Not documented	United States; John Coggan; Crew not documented	Not documented	Not documented
1974/75 Not documented	Australia; Jim Hardy; Crew not documented	Not documented	Not documented
1975/76 Not documented	Australia; David Forbes; Crew not documented	Not documented	Not documented
1976/77; City of Cockburn	Australia KA 146; Noel Robins; Crew not documented	Australia KA 133; Phil Susans; Crew not documented	Australia KA 114; Tony Manford; Crew not documented
1977/78; Sydney harbour	Australia KA 147; Tony Manford; Crew not documented	Not documented	Not documented
1978/79; Port Lincoln	Australia KA 150; John Bertrand; Mark Fisher; Tim Dorning	Australia KA 144; Mark Bethwaite; Crew not documented	Australia KA 146; Noel Robins; Crew not documented
1979/80; City of Lake Macquarie	Australia KA 150; John Bertrand; Mark Fisher; Tim Dorning	Australia KA 144; Mark Bethwaite; Ian MacDiarmid; Garry Reid	Australia KA 147; Tony Manford; Crew not documented
1980/81; Port Lincoln	Australia KA 144; Mark Bethwaite; Ian MacDiarmid; Garry Reid	Australia KA 148; Syd Corser; Ian MacDiarmid; Garry Reid	Australia KA 146; Noel Robins; Crew not documented
1981/82; Perth	Australia KA 144; Mark Bethwaite; Ian McDiarmid; Glen Read	United States US 710; Dave Perry; Brad Dellenbaugh; Ed Travelyan	Australia KA 143; Peter Gilmour; Crew not documented
1982/83; Adelaide	Australia KA 144; Mark Bethwaite; Ian McDiarmid; Not documented	Australia KA 143; Peter Gilmour; Lloyd Lissiman; Not documented	Australia KA 152; John Savave; Crew not documented
1983/84; Adelaide	Australia; Peter Gilmour; Crew not documented	Australia; Mark Bethwaite; Crew not documented	Australia; Willy Packer; Crew not documented
1984/85; Port Lincoln	Australia; Peter Gilmour; Crew not documented	Australia; Gary Sheard; Crew not documented	Australia; Tony Manning; Crew not documented
1985/86; Melbourne	Australia; Glen Collings; Crew not documented	Australia; Gary Sheard; Crew not documented	Australia; Andy Allsep; Crew not documented
1986/87; Fremantle	Australia KA 144; Glen Collings; Crew not documented	Australia KA 159; Barry Waller; Crew not documented	United States US 725; Stuart H. Walker; Crew not documented
1987/88; Melbourne	United States US 736; John Kostecki; Robert Billingham; William Baylis	Australia KA 170; Glen Collings; Crew not documented	Australia KA 168; Bobby Wilmot; Crew not documented
1988/89; Sydney	Australia KA 45; Jamie Wilmot; P. Gossing; G. Crowie	Australia KA 169; Jim Hardy; Warwick Anderson; D. Hardy	Australia KA 142; Matt Hayes; M. Wilson; D. James
1989/90; Port Lincoln	Australia KA 166; Andy Allsep; Crew not documented	Australia KA 159; Murray Smith; Crew not documented	Australia KA 165; Gary Cassidy; Crew not documented
1990/91; Fremantle	Australia; Matt Hayes	Not documented	Not documented
1991/92; Manly Beach	Australia; Neville Wittey	Not documented	Not documented
1992/93 Not documented	Australia; Barry Waller	Not documented	Not documented
1993/94; Perth	Australia; Glen Tucker	Not documented	Not documented
1994/95; Melbourne	Australia; Cameron Miles	Chris Links	James Mayjor

Medal tally
Rank	Nation	Gold	Silver	Bronze	Total
1	Australia (AUS)	23	12	12	47
2	United States (USA)	2	1	1	4
3	Great Britain (GBR)	1	0	0	1
Totals (3 entries)		26	13	13	52

===== European Championships =====
====== Fleet racing ======
Year	Gold	Silver	Bronze
1968; Denmark; Skovshoved	Norway; Per Spilling; Jim Mc Elvin; Dag Blomdal	Netherlands; Geert Bakker; Crew not documented	Denmark; Niels Bolt Jörgensen; Crew not documented
1969; Sweden; Sandhamn	Sweden; Arved von Grünewaldt; Tommy Nilsson; Anders Nordin	Sweden; H. Kellner; Crew not documented	West Germany; Norbert Wagner; Crew not documented
1970; Norway; Hankø	Denmark; Paul Elvstrøm; Poul Mik-Meyer; Jan Kjærulff	Sweden; Arved von Grünewaldt; Tommy Nilsson; Anders Nordin	Sweden; Pelle Petterson; Crew not documented
1971; West Germany; Travemünde	Denmark; Paul Elvstrøm; Flemming Jensen; Valdemar Bandolowski	Soviet Union; Timur Pinegin; Valentin Zamotaykin; Rais Galimov	Denmark; Niels Bolt Jörgensen; Crew not documented
1972; Denmark; Skovshoved	East Germany; Roland Schwarz; Lothar Köpsel; Werner Christoph	United Kingdom; John Oakeley; Charles Reynolds; Barry Dunning	Denmark; Paul Elvstrøm; Niels Jensen; Valdemar Bandolowski
1973; Netherlands; Medemblik	East Germany; Dieter Below; Michael Zachries; Olaf Engelhardt	Austria; Uli Strohschneider; Crew not documented	East Germany; Roland Schwarz; Lothar Köpsel; Werner Christoph
1974; United Kingdom; Firth of Clyde	West Germany; Willi Kuhweide; Karsten Meyer; Axel May	Denmark; Poul Richard Høj Jensen; Crew not documented	East Germany; Roland Schwarz; Lothar Köpsel; Werner Christoph
1975; Italy; Alassio	Sweden; Stig Wennerström; Stefan Krook; Lennart Roslund	East Germany; Roland Schwarz; Lothar Köpsel; Werner Christoph	Italy; Fabio Albarelli; Leopoldo di Martino; Guidotti
1976; Switzerland; Geneva	East Germany; Dieter Below; Michael Zachries; Olaf Engelhardt	Denmark; Poul Richard Høj Jensen; Valdemar Bandolowski; Erik Hermann Hansen	Austria; Herbert Raudaschl; Walter Raudaschl; Rudi Mayer
1977; Greece; Piraeus	West Germany; Fritz Geis; Gerhard Fehlner; Ernst Günter Beck	West Germany; Willi Kuhweide; Axel May; Karsten Meyer	Denmark; Valdemar Bandolowski; Crew not documented
1978; West Germany; Kiel	Canada; Hans Fogh; John Kerr; Dennis Toews	Canada; Glenn Dexter; Andreas Josenhans; Sandy McMillan	East Germany; Dieter Below; Olaf Engelhardt; Michael Zachries
1979; France; La Rochelle	Brazil; Eduardo de Souza; Manfred Kaufman; Thomas Heiman	Netherlands; Geert Bakker; Pieter Keijzer; Harald de Vlaming	Sweden; Arved von Grünewaltdt; Tommy Nilsson; Anders Nordin
1980; Finland; Helsinki	Soviet Union; Boris Budnikov; Nikolay Polyakov; Aleksandr Budnikov	West Germany; Willi Kuhweide; Eckart Loell; Sebastian Ziegelmayer	Denmark; Poul Richard Høj Jensen; Valdemar Bandolowski; Erik Hermann Hansen
1981; Austria; Attersee (lake)	Austria; Michael Farthofer; Christian Holler; Georg Vartian	East Germany; Jörg Hermann; B. Becker; O. Olbrich	West Germany; Fritz Geis; Richard Fricke; Karl Fricke
1982; Denmark; Dragør	Canada; Hans Fogh; John Kerr; Poul Richard Høj Jensen	Soviet Union; Boris Budnikov; Aleksandr Budnikov; Nikolay Polyakov	Soviet Union; Eugenij Kudriavtsev; Crew not documented
1983; Netherlands; Medemblik	Canada; Hans Fogh; John Kerr (sailor); Steve Calder	Soviet Union; Boris Budnikov; Gennadi Strakh; Oleg Miron	East Germany; Helmar Nauck; Norbert Hellriegel; Sven Diedering
1984	Not held due to Olympic Games		
1985; Hungary; Balatonfüred	Norway; Terje Wang; Jørn Petterson; Tom Stian Selander	East Germany; Jochen Schümann; Thomas Flach; Bernd Jäkel	Soviet Union; Georgy Shayduko; Sergej Kanov; Nikolay Polyakov
1986; East Germany; Warnemünde	East Germany; Jochen Schümann; Thomas Flach; Bernd Jäkel	Sweden; Lennart Persson; Eje Öberg; Tony Wallin	Germany; Thomas Jungblut; Thomas Maschkiwitz; Tim Kröger
1987; Sweden; Karlshamn	Soviet Union; Georgy Shayduko; Sergej Kanov; Nikolay Polyakov	East Germany; Jochen Schümann; Thomas Flach; Bernd Jäkel	Canada; Hans Fogh; Steve Calder; Hank Lammens
1988; Italy; Alassio	East Germany; Jochen Schümann; Thomas Flach; Bernd Jäkel	United States; John Kostecki; William Baylis; Bob Billingham	Denmark; Jesper Bank; Jan Mathiassen; Steen Secher
1989; Norway; Oslo	Denmark; Jesper Bank; Jesper Seier; Steen Secher	Soviet Union; Sergey Pichuguin; Gennadi Strakh; Andrei Nikandrov	East Germany; Jochen Schümann; Thomas Flach; Bernd Jäkel
1990; Germany; Prien am Chiemsee	France; Marc Bouet; Alain Pointet; Fabrice Levet	East Germany; Jochen Schümann; Thomas Flach; Bernd Jäkel	Netherlands; Roy Heiner; Ed van der Steene; Yska Minks
1991; France; La Baule	United States; Dave Curtis; Brad Dellenbaugh; Paul Murphy	Sweden; Magnus Holmberg; Björn Alm; Johan Barne	East Germany; Jochen Schümann; Thomas Flach; Bernd Jäkel
1992; Italy; Torbole	Sweden; Per Åhlby; Stefan Nordström; Jan-Olov Sandberg	Austria; Michael Luschan; Stefan Lindner; Georg Stadler	Sweden; Magnus Holmberg; Björn Alm; Johan Barne
1993; Slovenia; Portorose	Germany; Jochen Schümann; Thomas Flach; Bernd Jäkel	Germany; Albert Batzill; Peter Lang; Eddy Eich	Norway; Rune Jacobsen; Erling Landsværk; Thom Haaland
1994; Portugal; Vilamoura	Germany; Jochen Schümann; Thomas Flach; Bernd Jäkel	Denmark; Stig Westergaard; Jens Bojsen-Møller; Bjørn Westergaard	Australia; Ian Walker; Michael Peel; Stephan Jackson
1995; Sweden; Marstrand	Denmark; Jesper Bank; Kræn Nielsen; Thomas Jacobsen	Norway; Herman Horn Johannessen; Paul Davis; Espen Stokkeland	Australia; Cameron Miles; James Mayjor; Chris Links
1996; Hungary; Balatonfüred	Ukraine; Serhiy Pichuhin; Serhiy Khaindrava; Volodymyr Korotkov	Austria; Christian Binder; Franz Fellner; Volker Moser	Hungary; György Wossala; László Kovácsi; Károly Vezér
1997; United Kingdom; Troon	Germany; Jochen Schümann; Gunnar Bahr; Ingo Borkowski	Great Britain; Andy Beadsworth; Barry Parkin; Mason	Norway; Herman Horn Johannessen; Paul Davis; Espen Stokkeland
1998; Slovenia; Izola	Ukraine; Serhiy Pichuhin; Volodymyr Korotkov; Serhiy Timokhov	Russia; Georgy Shayduko; Sergey Voltshkov; S. Kramskoy	Germany; Jochen Schümann; Gunnar Bahr; Ingo Borkowski
1999; Sweden; Sandefjord	Netherlands; Roy Heiner; Peter Van Niekerk; Dirk de Ridder	Ukraine; Serhiy Pichuhin; Volodymyr Korotkov; Serhiy Timokhov	Germany; Jochen Schümann; Gunnar Bahr; Ingo Borkowski
2000; France; La Rochelle	Denmark; Jesper Bank; Henrik Blakskjær; Thomas Jacobsen	Russia; Georgy Shayduko; Oleg Khopyorsky; Andrey Kirilyuk	Ukraine; Serhiy Pichuhin; Volodymyr Korotkov; Serhiy Timokhov
2001; Austria; Attersee (lake)	Austria; Christian Binder; Nicky Fellner; Volker Moser	Germany; Heiko Winkler; Stefan Wenzel; Jens Niemann	Austria; Carl Auteried Jr. Thomas Beclin; Martin Kendler
2002; Italy; Castiglione della Pescaia	Austria; Carl Auteried Jr. Martin Kendler; Thomas Beclin	Austria; Markus Schneeberger; Volker Moser; Christian Panek	Hungary; György Wossala; László Kovácsi; Károly Vezér
2003; Italy; Torbole	Hungary; Gyenese Balázs; Gyula Mónus; Károly Vezér	Germany; Roman Koch; Maxl Koch; Gregor Bornemann	Germany; Karl Haist; Daniel Diesing; Jacob Carsten
2004; Norway; Tonsberg	Austria; Markus Schneeberger; Volker Moser; Christian Panek	Slovenia; Boštjan Antončič; Gennadi Strakh; Zeljko Perovic	Norway; Pål Christoffersen; Karl Book; Espen Kamperhaug
2005; Netherlands; Medemblik	Germany; Roman Koch; Maxl Koch; Gregor Bornemann	Hungary; György Wossala; Pepe Németh; Károly Vezér	Norway; Dag Usterud; Arne Ottestad; Eskil Sønju Le Bruyn Goldeng
2006; Hungary; Balatonfüred	Ukraine; Serhiy Pichuhin; Ivan Chehlatiy; Serhiy Timokhov	Germany; Roman Koch; Maxl Koch; Gregor Bornemann	Austria; Carl Auteried Jr. Udo Moser; Martin Kendler
2007; Norway; Arendal	Slovenia; Boštjan Antončič; Gennadi Strakh; Serhiy Pichuhin	Germany; Thomas Maschkiwitz; Christian Öhler; Kristof Wossala	Argentina; Gustavo Warburg; Maximo Smith; Miguel Lacour
2008; Hungary; Balatonfüred	Hungary; György Wossala; Károly Vezér; Pepe Németh	Germany; Roman Koch; Maxl Koch; Gregor Bornemann	Netherlands; Johan Offermans; Bas Dusee; Dominik Meissner
2009; Italy; Lovere	Germany; Roman Koch; Maxl Koch; Gregor Bornemann	Austria; Carl Auteried Jr. Udo Moser; Martin Kendler	Hungary; György Wossala; Peper Németh; Károly Vezér
2010; France; La Trinite sur Mer	Hungary; György Wossala; Károly Vezér; Pepe Németh	Germany; Roman Koch; Maxl Koch; Gregor Bornemann	Argentina; Gustavo Warburg; Maximo Smith; Hernan Celedoni
2011; Austria; Attersee (lake)	Germany; Uwe Steingross; Karsten Eller; Tim Giesecke	United States; Stuart H. Walker; Georg Stadler; Johannes Spitzk	Austria; Johann Kahls; Christian Kahls; Ronnie Zeiler
2012; Denmark; Arhus	Argentina; Gustavo Warburg; Rodrigo Ferrés; Miguel Lacour	Germany; Karl Haist; Martin Zeileis; Patrick Wichmann	Netherlands; Rudy den Outer; Gavin Lidlow; Ramzi Souli
2013; Italy; Castiglione della Pescaia	Ukraine; Igor Yushko; Serhiy Pichuhin; Dmitriy Yarmolenka	Germany; Roman Koch; Maxl Koch; Gregor Bornemann	United States; Charlie Kamps; Jeremy McMahon; Toby Kamps
2014; Italy; Saint-Pierre-Quiberon	Germany; Uwe Steingross; Karsten Eller; Tim Giesecke	Canada; Peter Hall; Steve Lacey; William Hall	Netherlands; Rudy den Outer; Gavin Lidlow; Ramzi Souli
2015; Germany; Grünau (Berlin)	Germany; Jochen Schümann; Thomas Flach; Ingo Borkowski & Bernd Jäkel (last race)	Hungary; Litkey Farkas; Károly Vezér; Gabor Croszlan	Ukraine; Igor Yushko; Sergey Pichugin; Igor Severianov
2016; Austria; Ebensee am Traunsee	Austria; Christian Binder; Klaus Kratochwill; Christian Feichtinger	Hungary; Litkey Farkas; Joo Kristoff; Gabor Croszlan	Canada; Peter Hall; Steve Lacey; William Hall
2017; Italy; Riva del Garda	Hungary; Litkey Farkas; Károly Vezér; Csaba Weinhardt	Austria; Florian Felzmann; Michael Felzmann; Margund Schuh	Ukraine; Igor Yushko; Serhiy Pichuhin; Igor Severianov
2018; Hungary; Alsóörs	Hungary; Sándor Varjas; László Kovácsi; Gábor Meretei	Hungary; György Wossala; Peter Németh; Christoph Wossala	Hungary; Annamária Sabján; Bea Majoross; András Bajusz
2019; Italy; Torbole	Finland; Eki Heinonen; Gabor Helmhout; Mathias Heinonen	Hungary; Sándor Varjas; László Kovácsi; Gábor Meretei	Austria; Florian Felzmann; Michael Felzmann; Markus Gnan
2020; Germany; Warnemünde	Not held due to COVID-19		
2021; Spain; Santander	Rescheduled and relocated due to COVID-19		
2021; Italy; Mandello del Lario	Netherlands; Rudy den Outer; Theo de Lange; Ramzi Souli	Hungary; Sándor Varjas; László Kovácsi; Gábor Meretei	Hungary; György Wossala; Károly Vezér; Christoph Wossala
2022; Austria; Attersee (lake)	Austria; Florian Felzmann; Stephan Beurle; Michael Felzmann	Hungary; Sándor Varjas; László Kovácsi; Gábor Meretei	Austria; Christian Spiessberger; Max Reisinger; Gerhard Schlipfinger

== Medal table ==
1968 - 2022
Rank	Nation	Gold	Silver	Bronze	Total
1	Germany	8	9	3	20
2	Austria	6	6	6	18
3	Hungary	6	6	5	17
4	East Germany	5	5	6	16
5	Sweden	4	4	3	11
6	Denmark	4	3	4	11
7	Ukraine	4	1	3	8
8	Canada	3	2	2	7
9	Soviet Union	2	4	2	8
10	West Germany	2	2	5	9
11	Netherlands	2	2	4	8
12	Norway	2	1	4	7
13	United States	1	2	1	4
14	Slovenia	1	1	0	2
15	Argentina	1	0	2	3
16	Brazil	1	0	0	1
16	Finland	1	0	0	1
16	France	1	0	0	1
19	Great Britain	0	2	0	2
19	Russia	0	2	0	2
21	Australia	0	0	2	2
22	Italy	0	0	1	1
Totals (22 entries)		54	52	53	159

Rank	Nation	Gold	Silver	Bronze	Total
1	Germany (GER)	8	9	3	20
2	Austria (AUT)	5	6	5	16
2	Hungary (HUN)	5	6	5	16
4	East Germany (GDR)	5	5	6	16
5	Sweden (SWE)	4	4	3	11
6	Denmark (DEN)	4	3	4	11
7	Ukraine (UKR)	4	1	3	8
8	Canada (CAN)	3	2	2	7
9	Soviet Union (URS)	2	4	2	8
10	West Germany (FRG)	2	2	5	9
11	Netherlands (NED)	2	2	4	8
12	Norway (NOR)	2	1	4	7
13	United States (USA)	1	2	1	4
14	Slovenia (SLO)	1	1	0	2
15	Argentina (ARG)	1	0	2	3
16	Brazil (BRA)	1	0	0	1
16	Finland (FIN)	1	0	0	1
16	France (FRA)	1	0	0	1
19	Great Britain (GBR)	0	2	0	2
19	Russia (RUS)	0	2	0	2
21	Australia (AUS)	0	0	2	2
22	Italy (ITA)	0	0	1	1
Totals (22 entries)		52	52	52	156

====== Match racing ======
Event	Gold	Silver	Bronze
1993 Kralingen (Netherlands)	NOR; Herman Horn Johannessen; Paul Davis; Espen Stokkeland	Not documented	Not documented
1994 Starnberg (Germany)	GER; Markus Wieser; Maxl Koch; Roman Koch	Not documented	Not documented
1995 Torbay (United Kingdom)	GBR; Andy Beadsworth	NOR; Herman Horn Johannessen; Paul Davis; Espen Stokkeland	GBR; Stuart Childerley
1996 Balaton (Hungary); Held September 1995	GER; Jochen Schümann; Thomas Flach; Bernd Jäkel	Not documented	Not documented
1997 St. Gilgen (Austria)	GER; Jochen Schümann; Gunnar Bahr; Ingo Borkowski	UKR; Sergey Pichuguin; Dmitriy Yarovoy; Sergey Timokhov	NOR; Herman Horn Johannessen; Paul Davis; Espen Stokkeland
1998 Torbole (Italy)	GER; Jochen Schümann; Gunnar Bahr; Ingo Borkowski	ESP; Luis Doreste; Domingo Manrique; David Vera	UKR; Sergey Pichuguin; Volodymyr Korotkov; Sergey Timokhov
1999 Input needed	Input needed	Input needed	Input needed
2000 Input needed	Input needed	Input needed	Input needed

Rank	Nation	Gold	Silver	Bronze	Total
1	Germany (GER)	4	0	0	4
2	Norway (NOR)	1	1	1	3
3	Great Britain (GBR)	1	0	1	2
4	Ukraine (UKR)	0	1	1	2
5	Spain (ESP)	0	1	0	1
Totals (5 entries)		6	3	3	12

===== North American Championship =====
Year	Gold	Silver	Bronze
1969; United States; Milwaukee	United States US 95; John Dane III; Mark LeBlanc; John Cerise	United States US ? Dick Stearns; Richie Stearns; Bruce Goldsmith	United States US 179; Gordon Lindemann; Not documented
1970; United States; Houston	United States US 437; Dave Curtis; Robbie Doyle; Ken Cormier	United States US ? Gerald Rumsey; Not documented	United States US 57; Don Bever; Not documented
1971; United States; Los Angeles	United States US 504; Robert Mosbacher; Thad Hutcheson; Tom Dickey	United States US 57; Don Bever; Not documented	United States US 414; Lowell North; Not documented
1972; United States; Oyster Bay	United States US 575; Dave Curtis; Joanne Curtis; John Rousmaniere; John Nystedt	United States US 379; Dean Mathews; Not documented	United States US 349; John Wolcot; Not documented
1973; Canada; Toronto	Canada KC 84; Sid Dakin; John Dakin; Peter Crowler	United States US 232; Jim Coggan; Not documented	United States US 564; Jon Ford; Not documented
1974; United States; Milwaukee	United States US 576; John Kolius; Richard Hoepfner; Bill Hunt	Australia KA 128; David Forbes; John Anderson; Denis O'Neil	United States US ? Jon Ford; Not documented
1975; United States; Rochester	Australia KA 128; David Forbes; John Anderson; Denis O'Neil	Canada KC 146; Sid Dakin; Not documented	Australia KA 39; Malcolm Anderson; Not documented
1976; United States; Seattle	United States US 593; Carl Buchan; Mara Buchan; Peter Scorett	United States US 627; Bill Engle; Not documented	United States US 296; Maurice Rattray; Not documented
1977; United States; Oyster Bay	Canada KC 151; Hans Fogh; Dennis Toews; John Kerr	United States US 686; Buddy Melges; Not documented	United States US 661; Joachim Shulz-Heik; Not documented
1978; United States; Newport Beach	United States US 707; Robbie Haines; Ed Trevelyan; Vince Brun	Canada KC 1 Bill Abbott Jr. Not documented	United States US 700; Buddy Melges; Not documented
1979; United States; Houston	Canada KC 1 Bill Abbott Jr. Bill Abbott Sr. Phil Bissel	United States US 712; Bill Allen; Will Perrigo; Brian Porter	United States US 697; Charlie Kamps; Bob Penticoff; Bill Blackett
1980; United States; Chicago	United States US 712; Bill Allen; Dale Hoffman; Brian Porter	Canada KC 1 Bill Abbott Jr. Bill Abbott Sr. Larry Abbott	Canada KC ? Hans Fogh; Not documented
1981; Canada; Sarnia	Brazil BL 42; Torben Grael; Daniel Adler; Ronaldo Senfft	Canada KC 1 Bill Abbott Jr. Not documented	Canada KC 169; Hans Fogh; Not documented
1982; United States; San Francisco	United States US 745; Ed Baird; Larry Klein; Tucker Edmundson	United States US 710; Dave Perry; Brad Dellenbaugh; Trevor	United States US 747; Robbie Haines; Ed Travelyan; Rod Davis
1983; United States; Rochester	United States US 757; Buddy Melges; Buddy Melges III; Hans Melges	United States KC ? Hans Fogh; Not documented	United States KC ? Peter Hall; Andreas Josenhans; Not documented
1984; United States; Oyster Bay	Canada KC ? Hans Fogh; Dennis Toews; Steve Calder	United States US ? Brian Porter; Not documented	Canada KC 1 Bill Abbott Jr. Not documented
1985; United States; Milwaukee	Canada KC 176; Hans Fogh; Steve Calder; Rob Maru	United States US 706; John Kostecki; Bob Billingham; William Baylis	United States US 758; Brian Porter; Not documented
1986; Canada; Kingston	Canada KC 176; Hans Fogh; Steve Calder; Rob Maru	United States US 777; Dave Curtis; Not documented	United States US 769; Gerard Coleman; Peter Coleman; Paul Coleman
1987; United States; Santa Cruz	United States US 736; John Kostecki; Robert Billingham; William Baylis	United States US 793; Ed Baird; Not documented	United States US 772; Kevin Mahaney; Not documented
1988; United States; Wilmette	United States US 787; Kevin Mahaney; Lance Mahaney; Jim Brady	Canada KC 185; Jim Beatty; Not documented	United States US 725; Stuart H. Walker; Not documented
1989; United States; Annapolis	United States US 787; Kevin Mahaney; Jim Brady; Doug Kern	United States US 786; Dave Curtis; Not documented	Canada KC 1 Bill Abbott Jr. Not documented
1990; United States; Tiburon	United States US 786; Dave Curtis; Brad Dellenbaugh; Robert Billingham	New Zealand KZ 16; Tom Dodson; Not documented	United States US 787; Kevin Mahaney; Jim Brady; Doug Kern
1991; United States; Chicago	United States US 772; Kevin Mahaney; Jim Brady; Doug Kern	United States US 787; John Kostecki; Robert Billingham; William Baylis	Canada KC 182; Paul Thomson; Stuart Flinn; Philip Gow
1992; United States; Houston	United States US 801; Larry Klein; Wally Corwin; Steve Burns	United States US 811; Peter Coleman; Paul Coleman; Not documented	Canada KC 196; Bruce Clifford; Chris Tattersall; Bruce Hitchner
1993; United States; Rochester	United States USA 801; Larry Klein; Wally Corwin; Steve Burns	United States USA 811; Jeff Madrigali; Jim Barton; Kent Massey	Canada CAN 201; Hans Fogh; Philip Gow; Palter
1994; United States; Oyster Bay	Canada CAN 201; Hans Fogh; Thomas Fogh; Simon van Wonderen	United States USA 823; Jeff Madrigali; Jim Barton; Kent Massey	United States USA 811; Peter Coleman; Paul Coleman; Not documented
1995; United States; San Francisco	United States USA 823; Jeff Madrigali; Jim Barton; Kent Massey	United States USA 820; Dave Curtis; Not documented	United States USA 803; Don Cohan; Not documented
1996; United States; Marblehead	United States USA 823; Jeff Madrigali; Jim Barton; Kent Massey	Denmark DEN 111; Stig Westergaard; Jens Bojsen-Møller; Jan Eli Andersen	Germany GER 307; Jochen Schumann; Thomas Flach; Bernd Jäkel
1997; United States; Wilmette	United States USA 820; Dave Curtis; Moose McKlintock; Karl Anderson	Canada CAN 1 Bill Abbott Jr. Joanne Abbott; Brad Boston	United States USA 831; Tony Rey; Burnham; Dean Brenner
1998; United States; Rochester	United States USA 823; Jeff Madrigali; Craig Healy; Hartwell Jordan	Canada CAN 214; Hans Fogh; Thomas Fogh; Michener	United States USA 831; Tony Rey; Burnham; Dean Brenner
1999; Canada; Etobicoke	United States USA 820; Dave Curtis; Frank Hart; Dean Brenner	Canada CAN 224; Hans Fogh; Not documented	Japan JPN 34; Kobun Kuramichi; Not documented
2000; United States; Annapolis	United States USA 848; Chris Larsen; Karl Anderson; Dave Moffett	Canada CAN 1 Bill Abbott Jr. Goyette; Not documented	United States USA 772; Jeff Gladchun; Norris; Smith
2001; United States; Milwaukee	United States USA 740; Kent Heitzinger; Mike Tennity; Bill Santos	Not documented	Not documented
2002; United States; Wilmette	United States USA 845; Jörgen Johnsson; Martin Johnsson; Mike Leslie	United States USA 832; Charlie Kamps; Jon Bailey; Charley Tollefsen	United States USA 740; Kent Heitzinger; Mike Tennity; Bill Santos
2003; United States; Milwaukee	United States USA 845; Jörgen Johnsson; Martin Johnsson; Augi Hernandez	United States USA 807; Joe Hoeksema; Rose Hoeksema; Michael Wolf	United States USA 832; Charlie Kamps; Vytas Kasniunas; Len Deliceat; George Petritz
2004; United States; Plattsburgh	Canada CAN 1 Bill Abbott Jr. Sarah Tucker; Jim Turvey	United States USA 831; Peter Galloway; Greg Anthony; Paul Steinborn	United States USA 839; Stuart H. Walker; Chris Brown; Bruce Empey
2005; Canada; Etobicoke	Canada CAN 1 Bill Abbott Jr. Joanne Abbott; Brad Boston	Canada CAN 230; Hans Fogh; Roger Cheer; John Kerr	Canada CAN 212; Bruce Clifford; Chris Tattersall; Matt Abbott
2006; United States; Milwaukee	United States USA 845; Jörgen Johnsson; Martin Johnsson; Augi Hernandez	United States USA 840; Jim Medley; Marc Hulburt; Chris Roberts	United States USA 832; Charlie Kamps; Vytas Kasniunas; Jon Bailey
2007; United States; Wilmette	Canada CAN 230; Hans Fogh; Roger Cheer; Gord Devries	United States USA 845; Jörgen Johnsson; Martin Johnsson; Augi Hernandez	Canada CAN 225; Peter Hall; Mike Parsons; Jami Allen
2008; Canada; Toronto	Canada CAN 230; Hans Fogh; Roger Cheer; Gord Devries	Canada CAN 225; Peter Hall; Philip Kerrigan; T. Park	Canada CAN 211; Kevin Brown; Mark Bird; Stephen Jones
2009; United States; Plattsburgh	Canada CAN 225; Peter Hall; Philip Kerrigan; Gavin Flynn	Canada CAN 230; Hans Fogh; Roger Cheer; Gord Devries	United States USA 839; Stuart H. Walker; Bruce Empey; Doug Loup
2010; Canada; Bath	Canada CAN 230; Hans Fogh; Roger Cheer; Gord Devries	United States USA 839; Stuart H. Walker; Bruce Empey; Doug Loup	Canada CAN 225; Peter Hall; Philip Kerrigan; Ross Findlater
2011; United States; Milwaukee	Canada CAN 226; Manfred Kanter; Blair Tully; Tom Freemann	Canada CAN 225; Peter Hall; Philip Kerrigan; Mike Parsons	Canada CAN 230; Hans Fogh; John Kerr; Gord Devries
2012; Canada; Kingston	Canada CAN 225; Peter Hall; Paul Davis; Will Hall	Canada CAN 230; Hans Fogh; John Finch; Gord Devries	Canada CAN 1 Bill Abbott Jr. Joanne Abbott; Scott Banford
2013; United States; Plattsburgh	Canada CAN 230; Hans Fogh; Ross Findlater; Gord Devries	Canada CAN 1 Bill Abbott Jr. Joanne Abbott; Scott Banford	Canada CAN 225; Peter Hall; Steve Lacey; Will Hall
2014; Canada; Port Stanley	Canada CAN 225; Peter Hall; Paul Davis; Will Hall	Canada CAN 1 Bill Abbott Jr. Joanne Abbott; Larry Abbott	Canada CAN 230; Thomas Fogh; Ross Findlater; Gord Devries
2015; United States; Wilmette	Canada CAN 225; Peter Hall; Will Hall; Steve Lacey	Canada CAN 230; Thomas Fogh; Ross Findlater; Gord Devries	Germany GER 11; Michael Dietzel; Tim Schutte; Hannes Ramoser
2016; Canada; Sarnia	Canada CAN 1 Bill Abbott Jr. Paul Davis; Joanne Abbott	Canada CAN 225; Peter Hall; Will Hall; Ross Findlater	Canada CAN 230; Thomas Fogh; Roger Cheer; Gord Devries
2017; United States; Milwaukee	Canada CAN 225; Peter Hall; Will Hall; Gord Devries	Germany GER 11; Michael Dietzel; Hannes Ramoser; Connor Clafin	United States USA 816; Ross Richards; Patrick Richards; Drew Kosmoski
2018; Canada; Montreal	Canada CAN 231; Manfred Kanter; Anne Marie Willan; Gord Devries	Canada CAN 1 Bill Abbott Jr. Joanne Abbott; Scotty McNeil	Canada CAN 225; Peter Hall; Will Hall; Steve Lacey
2019; Canada; Kingston	Netherlands NED 33; Rudy den Outer; Theo de Lange; Thies Bosch	Canada CAN 1 Bill Abbott Jr. Paul Davis; Joanne Abbott	Canada CAN 225; Peter Hall; Will Hall; Scotty McNeil
2020; United States; Annapolis	Postponed due to COVID-19 till 2021		
2021; United States; Annapolis	Again postponed due to COVID-19 till 2022		
2022; United States; Annapolis	Canada CAN 255; Peter Hall; John Bailey; Antoine Pacarar	Germany GER 11; Michael Dietzel; Martin Zeileis; Hannes Ramoser	United States USA 845; Dave Baum; Cate Muller; Brian Lennie
2023; Canada; Hamilton			

== Medal table ==
Countries
Rank	Nation	Gold	Silver	Bronze	Total
1	United States	27	25	28	80
2	Canada	22	21	19	62
3	Australia	1	1	1	3
4	Brazil	1	0	0	1
4	Netherlands	1	0	0	1
6	Germany	0	2	2	4
7	Denmark	0	1	0	1
7	New Zealand	0	1	0	1
9	Japan	0	0	1	1
Totals (9 entries)		52	51	51	154

===== South American Championship =====
Year	Gold	Silver	Bronze
1971 Argentina; Buenos Aires	Argentina; Horatio Campi; Crew not documented	Not documented	Not documented
1972 Brazil; Rio de Janeiro	Brazil; Gastão Brun; Crew not documented	Brazil; Ivan Pimentel; Crew not documented	Brazil; Axel Schmidt; Crew not documented
1973 Argentina; Buenos Aires	Argentina; Ricardo Boneo; Crew not documented	Not documented	Not documented
1974 Brazil; Rio de Janeiro	Brazil; Gastão Brun; Crew not documented	Brazil; Erik Schmidt; Axel Schmidt; Not documented	Brazil; Harry Adler; Crew not documented
1975 Argentina; Mar del Plata	Argentina; Ricardo Boneo; Héctor Campos; Hugo Arazi	Spain; Juan Costas; Humberto Costas; Felix Anglada	Argentina; Pedro Ferrero; Andrés Robinson; Jorge Rão
1976 Brazil; Rio de Janeiro	Brazil; Gastão Brun	Not documented	Not documented
1977 Brazil; Rio de Janeiro	Brazil; Augusto Barrozo; Carlos Brito; Sergio Nascimento	Netherlands; Geert Bakker; Ken Berkeley Australia; Daniel Adler Brazil	Brazil; Fernando Nabuco; R. Nabuco; J. Zarif
1978 Argentina; Buenos Aires	Brazil; Fernando Nabuco; Crew not documented	Argentina; Pedro Ferrero; Crew not documented	Argentina; A. Zucolli; Crew not documented
1979 Brazil; Rio de Janeiro	Brazil; Vicente Brun; Not documented	Argentina; Pedro Ferrero; Not documented	Argentina; A. Zucolli; Not documented
1980 Argentina; Río de la Plata; Rio de Janeiro	United States; Jim Coggan; Pedro Ferrero Argentina; Alberto Llorens Argentina	Argentina; Claudio Fassardi; Jose Atencio; Miguel Fisher	Argentina; Ricardo Boneo; Santiago Austin; Pablo Campos
1981 Not Sailed
1982 Not Sailed
1983 Brazil; Rio de Janeiro	Brazil; Torben Grael; Daniel Adler; Ronaldo Senfft	Brazil; Augusto Barrozo; A.A. Guarischi; R. Kaufmann	Brazil; Reinaldo Conrad; C. Bieckard; C. Rittscher
1984 Argentina; Buenos Aires	Brazil; Augusto Barrozo; Crew not documented	Not documented	Not documented
1985 Argentina; Buenos Aires	Argentina; Horatio Pettamenti; Crew not documented	Not documented	Not documented
1986 Uruguay; Punta del Este	Argentina; Horatio Pettamenti; Crew not documented	Not documented	Not documented
1987 Uruguay; Punta del Este	Brazil; Augusto Barrozo; Crew not documented	Argentina; Guillermo Castro; Crew not documented	Uruguay; Bernd Knuppel; Crew not documented
1988 Not sailed
1989 Not sailed
1990 Brazil; Armação dos Búzios	Brazil; Jose Paulo Dias; Daniel Adler; N. Palcão	Brazil; Reinaldo Conrad; Ralph Conrad; Roberto Skuplik	Brazil; J. King; L. Carlos F. Simão; D. Wilcox
1991 Punta del Este			
1992 Not sailed
1993 Not sailed
1994 Not sailed
1995 Not sailed
1996 Not sailed
1997 Paranaguá	Brazil; Alan Adler; Crew not documented	Brazil; Jose Paulo Dias; Crew not documented	Brazil; Luciano Oliveira; Crew not documented
1998 Armação dos Búzios	Brazil; Jose Paulo Dias; Alessandro Gioia; Daniel Glomb	Brazil; Alan Adler; Marcelo Ferreira; Daniel Adler	Brazil; George Nehm; Marcos Ribeiro; Lucio Ribeiro
1999 Paranaguá	Argentina; Gustavo Warburg; Matias Collins; Maximo Smith	Brazil; Alan Adler; Marcelo Ferreira; Daniel Glomb	Brazil; Jose Paulo Dias; Ronaldo Senfft; Daniel Adler
2000 Porto Alegre	Brazil; Alan Adler; Crew not documented	Uruguay; Ricardo Fabbini; Crew not documented	Brazil; Daniel Glomb; Crew not documented
2001 Buenos Aires	Argentina; Martin Busch; Pablo Noceti; Ismael Ayerza	Argentina; Miguel Saubidet; Cristian Petersen; Lucas Petersen	Argentina; Gustavo Warburg; Hernan Celedoni; Maximo Smith
2002 Porto Alegre	Brazil; Alexandre Paradeda; Caio Vergo; Andre Gick	Argentina; Gustavo Warburg; Santiago Jost; Maximo Feldtmann	Brazil; George Nehm; Marcos Ribeiro; Lúcio Ribeiro
2003 Porto Alegre	Argentina; Gustavo Warburg; Hernan Celedoni; Maximo Smith	Argentina; Martin Busch; Pablo Noceti; Andres Ezcurra	Brazil; Daniel Glomb; Andre Gick; Caio Vergo
2004 Porto Alegre	Brazil; George Nehm; Marcos Ribeiro; Lúcio Ribeiro	Brazil; Daniel Glomb; Andre Gick; Caio Vergo	Brazil; Ernesto Neugebauer; Lucas Ostergren; Adrion Santos
2005 Punta del Este	Argentina; Gustavo Warburg; Erich Mones Ruiz; Maximo Smith	Brazil; George Nehm; Marcos Ribeiro; Lúcio Ribeiro	Argentina; Martin Busch; Pablo Noceti; Maximo Feldtmann
2006 San Isidro	Argentina; Gustavo Warburg; Hernan Celedoni; Maximo Smith	Brazil; George Nehm; Marcos Ribeiro; Lúcio Ribeiro	Argentina; Martin Busch; Pablo Noceti; Maximo Feldtmann
2007 Porto Alegre	Brazil; George Nehm; Marcos Ribeiro; Lúcio Ribeiro	Argentina; Gustavo Warburg; Maximo Feldtmann; Maximo Smith	Brazil; Andre Wahrlich; Andre Gick; Henrique De Lorenzi
2008 Punta del Este	Brazil; George Nehm; Marcos Ribeiro; Lúcio Ribeiro	Argentina; Gustavo Warburg; Nicolas; Maximo Smith	Argentina; Martin Busch; Diego Weppler; Juan Pedro Masseroni
2009 Colonia del Sacramento	Argentina; Gustavo Warburg; Maximo Feldtmann; Maximo Smith	Brazil; George Nehm; Marcos Ribeiro; Lúcio Ribeiro	Argentina; Martin Busch; Diego Weppler; Zimermann
2010 Punta del Este	Brazil; Cicero Hartmann; Andre Renard; Flávio Quevedo	Brazil; Guilherme Roth; Marcos Ribeiro; Lúcio Ribeiro	Argentina; Santiago Nottebohm; Pablo Araujo; Lucas Tumulty
2011 Buenos Aires	Argentina; Gustavo Warburg; Eduardo Coulon; Maximo Smith	Argentina; Alberto Zanetti; Gerardo Della Torre; Ricky Homps	Argentina; Pablo Despontin; Pablo Noceti; Ezequiel Fernandez Sasso
2012 Punta del Este	Brazil; Andre Wahrlich; Manfredo Floricke; Leonardo Gomes	Brazil; George Nehm; Marcos Ribeiro; Lúcio Ribeiro	Argentina; Gustavo Warburg; Federico Calegari; Juan Lago
2013 San Isidro	Brazil; George Nehm; Marcos Ribeiro; Lúcio Ribeiro	Argentina; Pablo Despontin; Pablo Noceti; Ezequiel Fernandez Sasso	Argentina; Gustavo Warburg; Eduardo Coulon; Maximo Smith
2014 Porto Alegre	Brazil; Cicero Hartmann; Flavio Quevedo; Andre Renard	Brazil; George Nehm; Marcos Ribeiro; Lúcio Ribeiro	Brazil; Nelson Ilha; Gustavo Ilha; Carlo de Leo
2015 San Isidro	Brazil; Cicero Hartmann; Flavio Quevedo; Andre Renard	Argentina; Martin Busch; Eduardo Zimermann; Maximo Feldtmann	Brazil; Kadu Bergenthal; Eduardo Cavalli; Renan Oliveira
2016 Porto Alegre	Brazil; Cicero Hartmann; Flavio Quevedo; Andre Renard	Brazil; Kadu Bergenthal; Eduardo Cavalli; Renan Oliveira	Brazil; Nelson Ilha; Gustavo Ilha; Carlo de Leo
2017 Rio Grande	Brazil; George Nehm; Marcos Ribeiro; Lúcio Ribeiro	Brazil; Cicero Hartmann; Flavio Quevedo; Andre Renard	Brazil; Kadu Bergenthal; Eduardo Cavalli; Renan Oliveira
2018 Fray Bentos	Brazil; Dennis Koch; Manfredo Floricke; Pedro Ilha	Brazil; Kadu Bergenthal; Eduardo Cavalli; Renan Oliveira	United States; Matias Collins; Tomas Morgan; Mariano Cambon
2019 Punta del Este	Brazil; Cicero Hartmann; Flavio Quevedo; Andre Renard	Brazil; Kadu Bergenthal; Vilnei Goldmeier; Philipp Chtmann	Brazil; Nelson Ilha; Manfredo Flöricke; Pedro Ilha
2020 Darsena			

Medal tally
Rank	Nation	Gold	Silver	Bronze	Total
1	Brazil (BRA)	26	18	18	62
2	Argentina (ARG)	12	12	13	37
3	United States (USA)	1	0	1	2
4	Uruguay (URU)	0	1	1	2
5	Netherlands (NED)	0	1	0	1
5	Spain (ESP)	0	1	0	1
Totals (6 entries)		39	33	33	105

=== Soling World Trophy ===
Year	Country	Sailors	Note
1985	United States	William Baylis, Robert Billingham, John Kostecki	
1986	East Germany	Thomas Flach, Bernd Jäkel, Jochen Schümann	
1987	Soviet Union	Sergey Kanov, Nikolai Poliakov, Georgy Shayduko	
1988	United States	William Baylis, Robert Billingham, John Kostecki	
1989	East Germany	Thomas Flach, Bernd Jäkel, Jochen Schümann	
1990	East Germany	Sven Diedering, Norbert Hellriegel, Helmar Nauck	
1991	East Germany	Thomas Flach, Bernd Jäkel, Jochen Schümann	
1992	Denmark	Jesper Bank, Steen Secher, Jesper Seier	
1993	Germany	Albert Batzill, Peter Lang, Eddy Eich	
1994	Sweden	Per Ahlby, Stefan Nordstrom, Tony Lundberg	
1995	Sweden	Björn Alm, Johan Barne, Magnus Holmberg	
1996	Germany	Thomas Flach, Bernd Jäkel, Jochen Schümann	
1997	Russia	Georgy Shayduko, Igor Skalin, Sergei Volchkov	
1998	Ukraine	Serhiy Pichuhin, Volodymyr Korotkov, Sergiy Timokhov	
1999	Netherlands	Roy Heiner, Peter van Niekerk, Dirk de Ridder	
2000	Germany	Gunnar Bahr, Ingo Borkowski, Jochen Schümann	
2001	No ranking system in place		
2002	Austria	Carl Auteried Jr., Thomas Beclin, Martin Kendler	
2002	Germany	Roman Koch	
2003	Hungary	Gyenese Balazs, Monus Gyula, Károly Vezér	European winners
2003	Brazil	George Nehm, Marcos Ribeiro, Lucio Ribeiro	South American winners
2003	United States	Stuart H. Walker	North American winner
2004	Hungary	László Kovácsi, Pepe Németh, György Wossala	
2005	Germany	Maxl Koch	
2006	Germany	Roman Koch	
2007	Hungary	Pepe Németh, György Wossala	
2008	Hungary	Károly Vezér, György Wossala	
2009	Germany	Maxl Koch, Roman Koch	
2010	Germany	Maxl Koch, Roman Koch	
2011	Germany	Karl Haist	
2012	Hungary	György Wossala	
2013	Canada	Peter Hall	
2014	Canada	Peter Hall, Will Hall	
2015	Hungary	Károly Vezér	
2016	Canada	Peter Hall	
2017	Ukraine	Serhiy Pichuhin, Igor Yushko, Igor Severianov	
2018	Hungary	Sándor Varjas	
2019	Austria	Martin Zeileis	
2020	No ranking due to COVID-19		
2021	Austria	Martin Zeileis	
2022	Austria	Martin Zeileis	

== Country ranking (1985–present) ==
The following table shows the countries in order of number of times winning the ranking list.

Ranking	Country	Winning
1	Germany	8
2	Hungary	7
3	Austria	4
3	East Germany	4
4	Canada	3
4	United States	3
7	Sweden	2
7	Ukraine	2
9	Brazil	1
9	Denmark	1
9	Netherlands	1
9	Russia	1
9	Soviet Union	1
