= Soling European Championship results (2020–2024) =

Soling European Championships

Soling
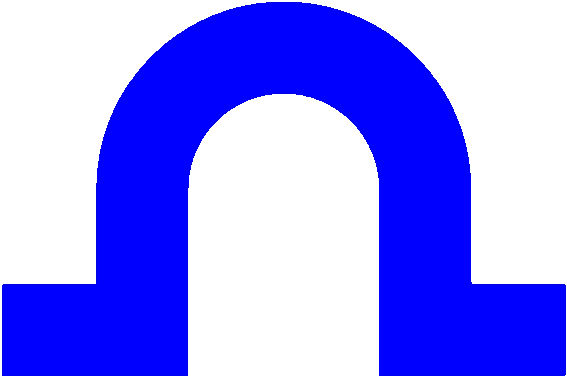

Development
- Name: Soling

The main article describes all European Soling Championships from one the first held in 1968 to the announced Championships in the near future. This article states the detailed results, where relevant the controversies, and the progression of the Championship during the series race by race of the European Soling Championships in the years 2020, 2021, 2022, 2023 and 2024. This is based on the major sources: World Sailing, the world governing body for the sport of sailing recognized by the IOC and the IPC, and the publications of the International Soling Association.

== 2020 Cancelled due to COVID-19 ==
2020
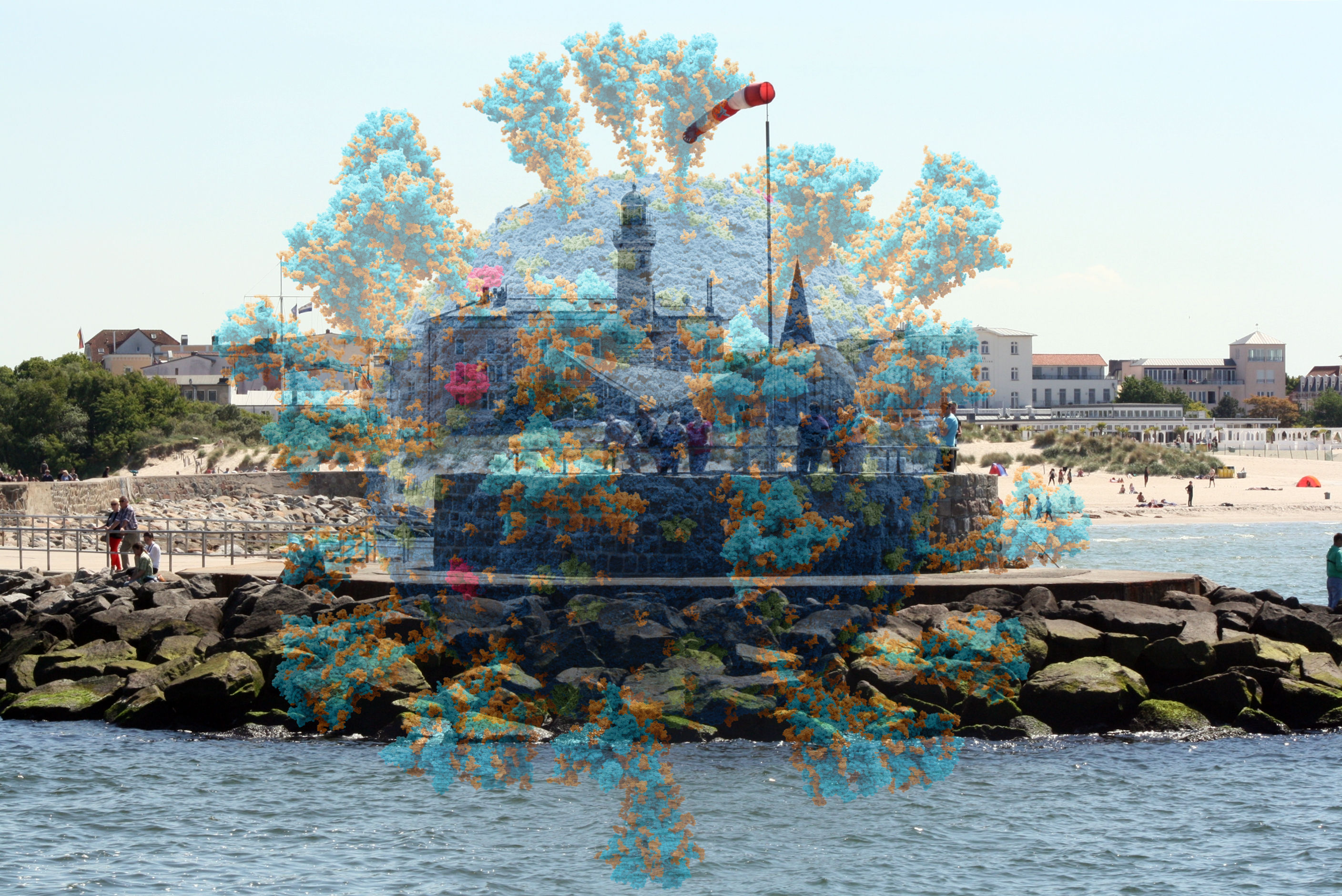

Event title
- Edition: 53
- Host: Warnemünder Segel-Club

Event details
- Venue: Warnemünde, Germany
- Dates: 4–12 July 2020

The Soling Europeans were scheduled from 4–12 July 2020 as sub-event of the Warnemünder Woche in Germany. Due to the COVID-19 pandemic the event was cancelled. The International Soling Association brainstormed if an alternate date and a location in Austria could be a solution. Finally the decision was made not to jeopardize the health Soling compatitors, host club organizers and other stakeholders and the event was cancelled.

== 2021 Final results ==
2021
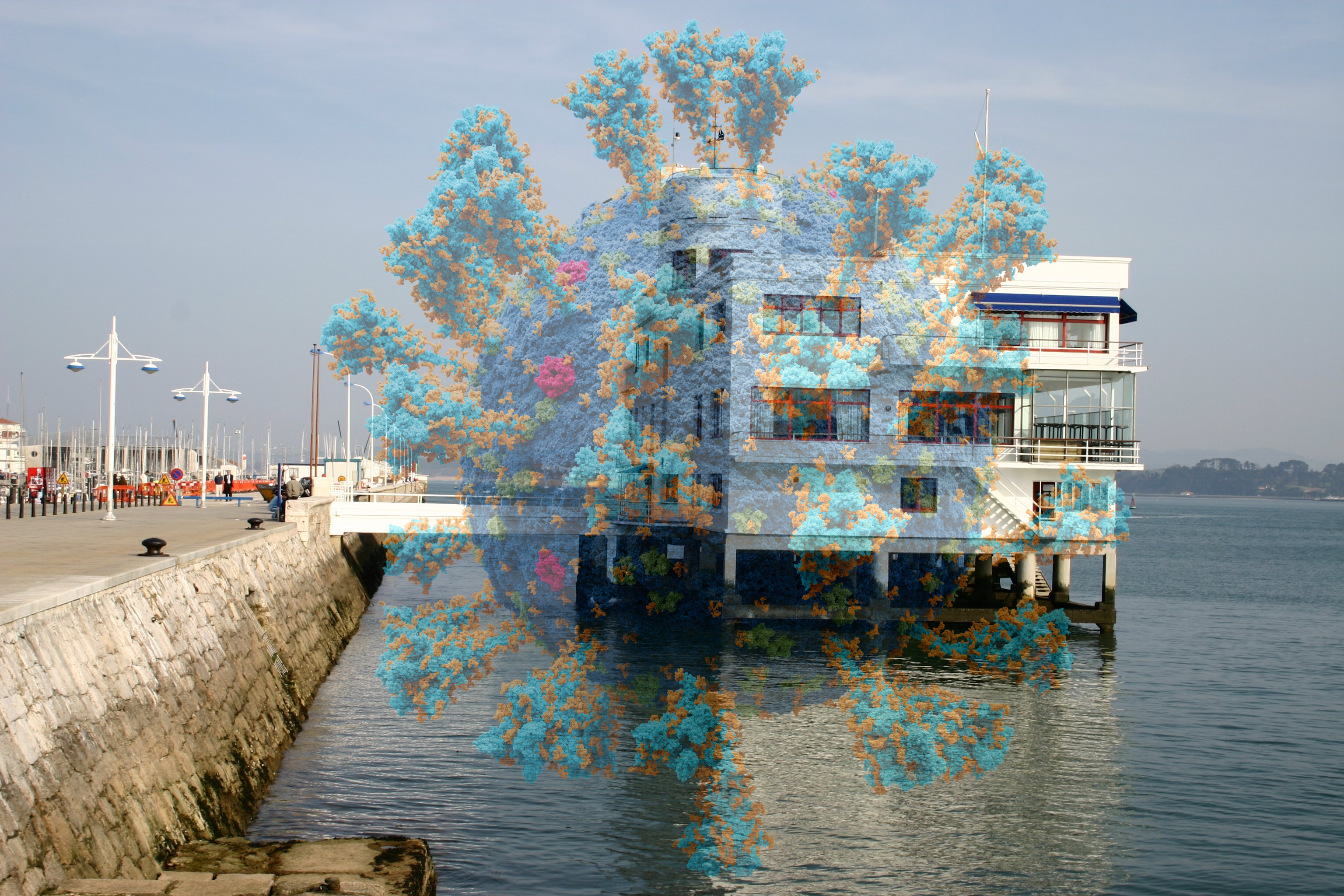

Event title
- Edition: 54a
- Host: Real Club Marítimo de Santander

Event details
- Venue: Santander, Spain

=== Postponement and Relocation ===
The event was scheduled for spring 2021 in Santander, Spain as part of the Santander International Sailing Week. Like in 2020 the COVID-19 situation in Europe was still unsafe and governmental restrictions made it difficult to held the event. When the Santander International Sailing Week was cancelled by the host club he International Soling Association asked Italy to prepare a European Soling Championship in autumn. When the pandemic situation became more safe and the restrictions were partly lifted in Europe the Championship could be rolled out in Mandello del Lario, Italy.

2021
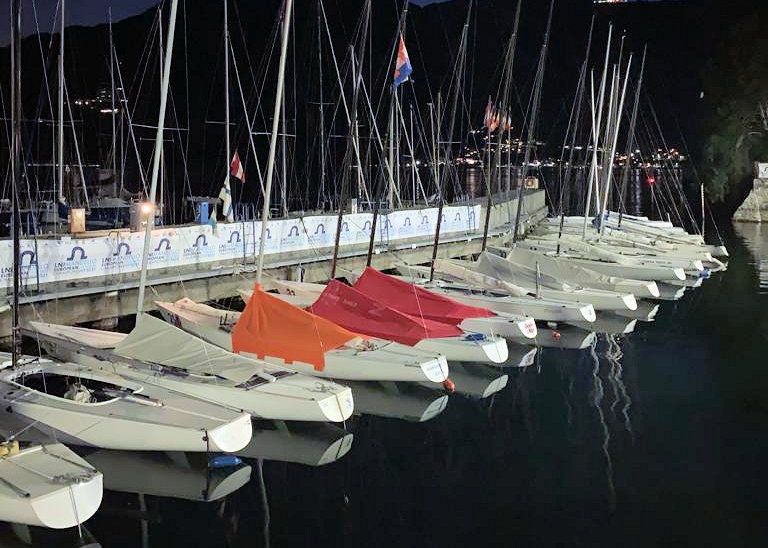

Event title
- Edition: 54b
- Host: Lega Navale Italiana Mandello (LNI)

Event details
- Venue: Mandello del Lario, Italy
- Dates: 30 September – 3 October 2021
- Yachts: 25
- Key people: Alberto De Amicis
- Opened by: A minimalized opening ceremony was held.
- Opening ceremony: 30 September

Competitors
- Competitors: 75
- Competing nations: 10

Results
- (gold) Gold: Netherlands; Rudy den Outer; Theo de Lange; Ramzi Souli
- (silver) Silver: Hungary; Sándor Varjas; László Kovácsi; Gábor Meretei
- (bronze) Bronze: Hungary; György Wossala; Károly Vezér; Christoph Wossala

Rank	Country	Helmsman	Crew	Sail No.	Race 1		Race 2		Race 3		Race 4		Total
Rank	Country	Helmsman	Crew	Sail No.	Pos.	Pts.	Pos.	Pts.	Pos.	Pts.	Pos.	Pts.	Total
1st place, gold medalist(s)	NED	Rudy den Outer	Theo de Lange; Ramzi Souli	NED 33	5	5	2	2	4	4	1	1	12
2nd place, silver medalist(s)	HUN	Sándor Varjas	László Kovácsi; Gábor Meretei	HUN 1	9	9	7	7	1	1	2	2	19
3rd place, bronze medalist(s)	HUN	György Wossala	Károly Vezér; Christoph Wossala	HUN 77	13	13	1	1	5	5	4	4	23
4	ITA	Pierluigi Puthod	Nicola Armellini; Pietro Kostner	ITA 241	3	3	3	3	13	13	6	6	25
5	CAN	Peter Hall	Martin Zeileis; Will Hall	CAN 225	4	4	10	10	6	6	5	5	25
6	ITA	Bruno Maffezzoli	Pier Francesco Maffezzoli; Marco Maffezzoli	ITA 259	1	1	12	12	7	7	14	14	34
7	NED	Bram Soethoudt	Gerben Hartog; Ben Boogaerdt	NED 38	12	12	4	4	14	14	7	7	37
8	GER	Christian Mack	Thomas Fabry; Max Haist	GER 2	7	7	9	9	2	2	20	20	38
9	USA	Matias Collins	Andreas Baumueller; Valentin Müller	USA 853	15	15	13	13	8	8	3	3	39
10	UKR	Igor Yushko	Serhiy Pichuhin; Sergej Ivansits	UKR 1	17	17	6	6	3	3	15	15	41
11	AUT	Ludwig Beurle	Christian Fischer; Eberhard Franke	AUT 102	10	10	5	5	17	17	9	9	41
12	FRA	François Gombeaud	Marc Lefevre; Christophe Hinfray	FRA 164	6	6	8	8	16	16	11	11	41
13	GER	Thomas Scherer	Dominik Meissner; Markus Stallhofer	GER 331	2	2	15	15	11	11	16	16	44
14	GER	Michael Dietzel	Anna Dietzel; Simon Zeh	GER 11	11	11	16	16	9	9	10	10	46
15	AUT	Alexander Wiesinger	Ekkehart Steinhuber; Weis Philipp	AUT 86	8	8	14	14	15	15	17	17	54
16	ITA	Alberto De Amicis	Daniel Diesing; Marco De Amicis	ITA 252	16	16	11	11	10	10	18	18	55
17	GER	Roman Koch	Felix Kling; Lukas Neun	GER 1	14	14	17	17	12	12	13	13	56
18	AUT	Xaver Seydl	Max Seydl; Bernhard Strauch	AUT 43	20	20	21	21	20	20	8	8	69
19	ITA	Michele Campagnoni	Simone Campagnoni; Federico Campagnoni	ITA 209	18	18	20	20	19	19	12	12	69
20	ITA	Marta Garrone	Marco Garrone; Matteo Garrone	ITA 119	19	19	22	22	18	18	22	22	81
21	ITA	Oscar Carbonell	Martin Stecher; Aron Stecher	ITA 251	21	21	19	19	22	22	21	21	83
22	ITA	Marco Colombo	Massimo Bonifaccio; Nomen nescio	ITA 212	23	23	OCS	24	21	21	19	19	87
23	ITA	Massimo Cattaneo	Andrea Serlini; Antonio Gorgoglione	ITA 194	22	22	18	18	DNS	24	DNS	24	88
24	GER	Nils Detlef	Philipp Detlef; Hans Otto Kessler	GER 272	DNS	24	DNS	24	DNS	24	DNS	24	96
25	ITA	Giovanni Di Vincenzo	Nomen nescio Nomen nescio	ITA 238	DNS	24	DNS	24	DNS	24	DNS	24	96

Legend: DNS – Did not start; OCS – On the course side of the starting line;

- 2021 Progress

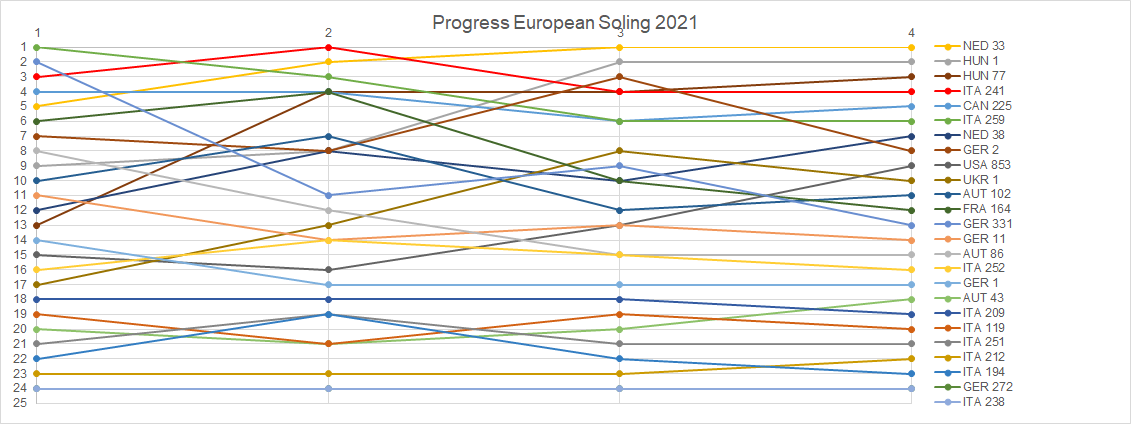

== 2022 Final results ==
2022
Event title
- Edition: 55

Event details
- Venue: Attersee (lake), Austria
- Dates: 29 August – 3 September 2022
- Yachts: 31
- Key people: Stephan Beule
- Opening ceremony: 30 September

Competitors
- Competitors: 93
- Competing nations: 10

Results
- (gold) Gold: Austria; Florian Felzmann; Stephan Beurle; Michael Felzmann
- (silver) Silver: Hungary; Sándor Varjas; László Kovácsi; Gábor Meretei
- (bronze) Bronze: Austria; Christian Spiessberger; Max Reisinger; Gerhard Schlipfinger

Rank	Country	Helmsman	Crew	Sail No.	Race 1		Race 2		Race 3		Race 4		Race 5		Race 6		Race 7		Race 8		Total	Total – discard
Rank	Country	Helmsman	Crew	Sail No.	Pos.	Pts.	Pos.	Pts.	Pos.	Pts.	Pos.	Pts.	Pos.	Pts.	Pos.	Pts.	Pos.	Pts.	Pos.	Pts.	Total	Total – discard
1st place, gold medalist(s)	AUT	Florian Felzmann	Stephan Beurle; Michael Felzmann	AUT 7	~~7~~	~~7~~	2	2	4	4	4	4	1	1	1	1	4	4	3	3	26	19
2nd place, silver medalist(s)	HUN	Sandor Varjas	László Kovácsi; Gábor Meretei	HUN 1	2	2	1	1	1	1	1	1	8	8	~~12~~	~~12~~	7	7	1	1	33	21
3rd place, bronze medalist(s)	AUT	Christian Spiessberger	Max Reisinger; Gerhard Schlipfinger	AUT 100	1	1	3	3	6	6	~~8~~	~~8~~	3	3	3	3	5	5	2	2	31	23
4	GER	Karl Haist	Martin Zeileis; Irene Haist	GER 308	5	5	11	11	2	2	2	2	2	2	4	4	~~14~~	~~14~~	7	7	47	33
5	AUT	Michael Farthofer	Rudolf Mattheis; Lili Farthofer	AUT 117	11	11	4	4	20	20	3	3	4	4	~~OCS~~	~~32~~	8	8	5	5	87	55
6	GER	Michael Dietzel	Vera Geck; Anton Dietzel	GER 11	12	12	12	12	~~28~~	~~28~~	5	5	5	5	11	11	3	3	11	11	87	59
7	UKR	Dmytro Yarovoy	Roman Marchenko; Roman Malyutin	UKR 2	10	10	6	6	8	8	7	7	~~21~~	~~21~~	9	9	15	15	4	4	80	59
8	AUT	Bernhard Klinger	Bjorn Gilhofer; Martin Lux	AUT 400	3	3	8	8	10	10	14	14	~~22~~	~~22~~	10	10	10	10	6	6	83	61
9	GER	Winfried Geisler	Bjorn Geisler; Philipp Behrendt	GER 311	~~19~~	~~19~~	7	7	18	18	15	15	9	9	7	7	2	2	9	9	86	67
10	CAN	Peter Hall	Peter Farbowski; Gord Devries	CAN 225	4	4	5	5	19	19	6	6	13	13	~~22~~	~~22~~	12	12	8	8	89	67
11	USA	Matias Collins	Andreas Baumueller; Valentin Muller	USA 853	9	9	17	17	~~27~~	~~27~~	11	11	15	15	8	8	1	1	12	12	100	73
12	AUT	Andreas Blaschke	Heiner Risch; Hannes Blaschke	AUT 139	8	8	13	13	13	13	10	10	6	6	14	14	11	11	~~DNF~~	~~32~~	107	75
13	GBR	Gary Richardson	Simon Walsh; George Barker	GBR 155	~~26~~	~~26~~	14	14	16	16	12	12	7	7	2	2	13	13	14	14	104	78
14	AUT	Alexander Wiesinger	Philipp Weis; Ekkehart Steinhuber	AUT 86	13	13	9	9	7	7	~~27~~	~~27~~	10	10	13	13	16	16	10	10	105	78
15	GER	Matthias Dulce	Eberhard Franke; Carolin Schaaf	GER 323	6	6	15	15	3	3	19	19	11	11	~~20~~	~~20~~	17	17	15	15	106	86
16	AUT	Harald Eder	Josef Matrei; Christoph Zellinger	AUT 333	14	14	10	10	12	12	13	13	12	12	5	5	~~20~~	~~20~~	20	20	106	86
17	GER	Roman Koch	Felix Kling; Lucas Neun	GER 1	16	16	18	18	14	14	~~20~~	~~20~~	14	14	15	15	6	6	13	13	116	96
18	GER	Tim Giesecke	Sven Rikwald; Carsten Fischer	GER 339	21	21	24	24	5	5	9	9	24	24	~~25~~	~~25~~	9	9	18	18	135	110
19	AUT	Wolfang Reisinger	Hans Schibany; Karl Boucek	AUT 93	18	18	26	26	15	15	~~OCS~~	~~32~~	18	18	6	6	22	22	21	21	158	126
20	AUT	Peter Neumann	Rudolf Hubauer; Richard Holler	AUT 122	31	31	16	16	9	9	26	26	20	20	23	23	18	18	~~DNF~~	~~32~~	175	143
21	AUT	Leo Lang	Georg Beurle; Vincent Venger	AUT 135	17	17	20	20	31	31	28	28	17	17	~~21~~	~~21~~	21	21	19	19	174	143
22	AUT	Matthias Puxkandl	Franz Schmidsberger; Xaver Haginger	AUT 143	22	22	27	27	21	21	23	23	16	16	16	16	~~25~~	~~25~~	23	23	173	146
23	NED	Bram Soethoudt	Sjors Hensberg; Ben Boogaerdt	NED 38	20	20	~~28~~	~~28~~	22	22	16	16	28	28	28	28	19	19	16	16	177	149
24	AUT	Alex Hasch	Bernhard Kreutzer; Lutz Gerald	AUT 127	25	25	~~30~~	~~30~~	24	24	18	18	23	23	19	19	24	24	17	17	180	150
25	AUT	Max Seydl	Moritz Strauch; Xaver Seydl	AUT 43	~~27~~	~~27~~	21	21	25	25	17	17	19	19	26	26	23	23	22	22	180	153
26	AUT	Ludwig Beurle	Christian Fischer; Markus Gnan	AUT 102	15	15	19	19	26	26	21	21	25	25	24	24	~~29~~	~~29~~	24	24	183	154
27	ITA	Alberto de Amicis	Daniel Diesing; Marco de Amicis	ITA 252	28	28	~~DSQ~~	~~32~~	17	17	22	22	30	30	18	18	26	26	25	25	198	166
28	GER	Gernot Heller	Gerhard Auerswald; Christian Kalhs	GER 312	~~30~~	~~30~~	25	25	11	11	25	25	27	27	27	27	30	30	26	26	201	171
29	USA	Herny Thomas	Jonathan Roberts; Peter Siegel	USA 1	29	29	23	23	~~30~~	~~30~~	24	24	26	26	17	17	27	27	27	27	203	173
30	GER	Lea Rabeder	Anna Saletu; Jan Kwapinski	GER 324	24	24	22	22	23	23	29	29	29	29	30	30	~~31~~	~~31~~	29	29	217	186
31	FRA	Marc Lefevre	Daniel Kerssimon; Christian Dousset	FRA 168	23	23	29	29	29	29	30	30	~~31~~	~~31~~	29	29	28	28	28	28	227	196

Legend: DNS – Did not start; OCS – On the course side of the starting line;

- 2022 Progress

== 2023 Bid process ==
2023
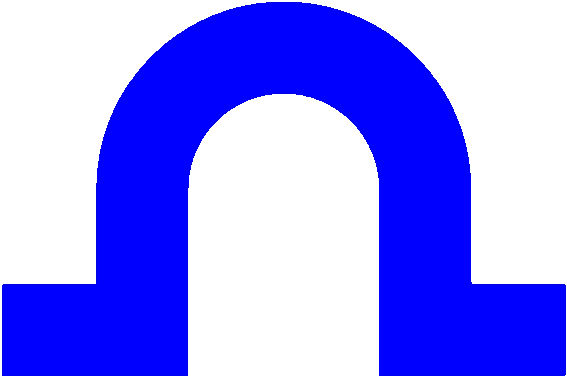

Event title
- Edition: 56
- Host: To be granted

Event details
- Venue: Open for bidding
- Dates: To be set

The 2023 Soling European Championship is not granted to a host club yet. Since the International Soling Association tries to alternate lake sailing and open water sailing the 2023 Europeans should preferably be organized on open water. Among the potential bidding host countries are:

- Germany: Warnemünde
- Spain: Palamos

== 2024 Bid Process ==
2024
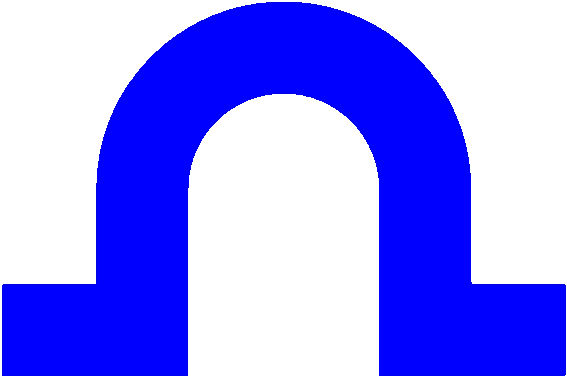

Event title
- Edition: 57
- Host: To be granted

Event details
- Venue: Open for bidding
- Dates: To be set

The 2024 Soling European Championship is not granted to a host club yet. Since the International Soling Association tries to alternate lake sailing and open water sailing the 2024 Europeans should preferably be organized on a lake.

== Further results ==
For further results see:

- Soling European Championship results (1968–1979)
- Soling European Championship results (1980–1984)
- Soling European Championship results (1985–1989)
- Soling European Championship results (1990–1994)
- Soling European Championship results (1995–1999)
- Soling European Championship results (2000–2004)
- Soling European Championship results (2005–2009)
- Soling European Championship results (2010–2014)
- Soling European Championship results (2015–2019)
- Soling European Championship results (2020–2024)
