= Thomas Jacobsen (sailor) =

Danish sailor

Medal record

Men's sailing

Representing Denmark

Olympic Games
Gold medal – first place	2000 Sydney	Soling class

Thomas Jacobsen (born 13 September 1972) is a Danish sailor and Olympic champion. He won a gold medal in the Soling class at the 2000 Summer Olympics in Sydney, together with Jesper Bank and Henrik Blakskjær.
