= Stephen Calder =

Canadian sailor

Personal information
- Born: December 1, 1957 (age 68) Detroit, Michigan, U.S.

Sailing career
- Sport: Sailing
Medal record
Men's sailing
Representing Canada
Olympic Games
Bronze medal – third place	1984 Los Angeles	Soling

Stephen "Steve" Calder (born December 1, 1957) is a Canadian sailor. Born in Detroit, Michigan, he won a bronze medal in the Soling Class at the 1984 Summer Olympics with Hans Fogh and John Kerr.
