= Henrik Blakskjær =

Danish sailor

Medal record

Men's sailing

Representing Denmark

Olympic Games
Gold medal – first place	2000 Sydney	Soling class

Henrik Blakskjær (born 8 July 1971) is a Danish sailor and Olympic champion. He won a gold medal in the Soling class at the 2000 Summer Olympics in Sydney, together with Jesper Bank and Thomas Jacobsen.
