= Steen Secher =

Danish sailor

Medal record

Men's sailing

Representing Denmark

Olympic Games
Gold medal – first place	1992 Barcelona	Soling class
Bronze medal – third place	1988 Seoul	Soling class

Steen Klaaborg Secher (born 9 April 1959 in Torsted, Horsens, Midtjylland) is a Danish sailor and Olympic champion.

He received a bronze medal in the Soling class at the 1988 Summer Olympics in Seoul. He won a gold medal at the 1992 Summer Olympics in Barcelona, together with Jesper Bank and Jesper Seier.
