= Ken Berkeley =

Australian sailor (1929–2018)

Personal information
- Full name: Klaas Berkeley
- Born: 14 October 1929
- Died: 30 July 2018 (aged 88)
- Height: 1.85 m (6.1 ft)

Sailing career
- Sport: Sailing
- Class: Soling
- Updated on 1 March 2014

Klaas "Ken" Berkeley (14 October 1929 – 30 July 2018) was an Australian sailor. Berkeley represented his country at the 1972 Summer Olympics in Kiel. Berkeley took 16th place in the Soling with Robert Miller as helmsman and Denis O'Neil as fellow crew member. Ken was president of the International Soling Association from 1980 – 1982.

Sporting positions
Preceded by (Netherlands) Geert Bakker	President International Soling Association; 1980–1982	Succeeded by (West Germany) Karl Heist
