= Stig Westergaard =

Danish sailor

Stig Westergaard (born 16 September 1963 in Esbjerg) is a Danish Olympic sailor in the Finn and Soling classes. Westergaard competed in the 1992 and 1996 Summer Olympics.

He has twice sailed the Volvo Ocean Race; in 2001–02 on Djuice Dragons and in 2008–09 on Kosatka.

He is the brother of Bjørn Westergaard. His son Magnus Westergaard is a professional footballer.
