= Rod Davis (sailor) =

American and New Zealand sailor

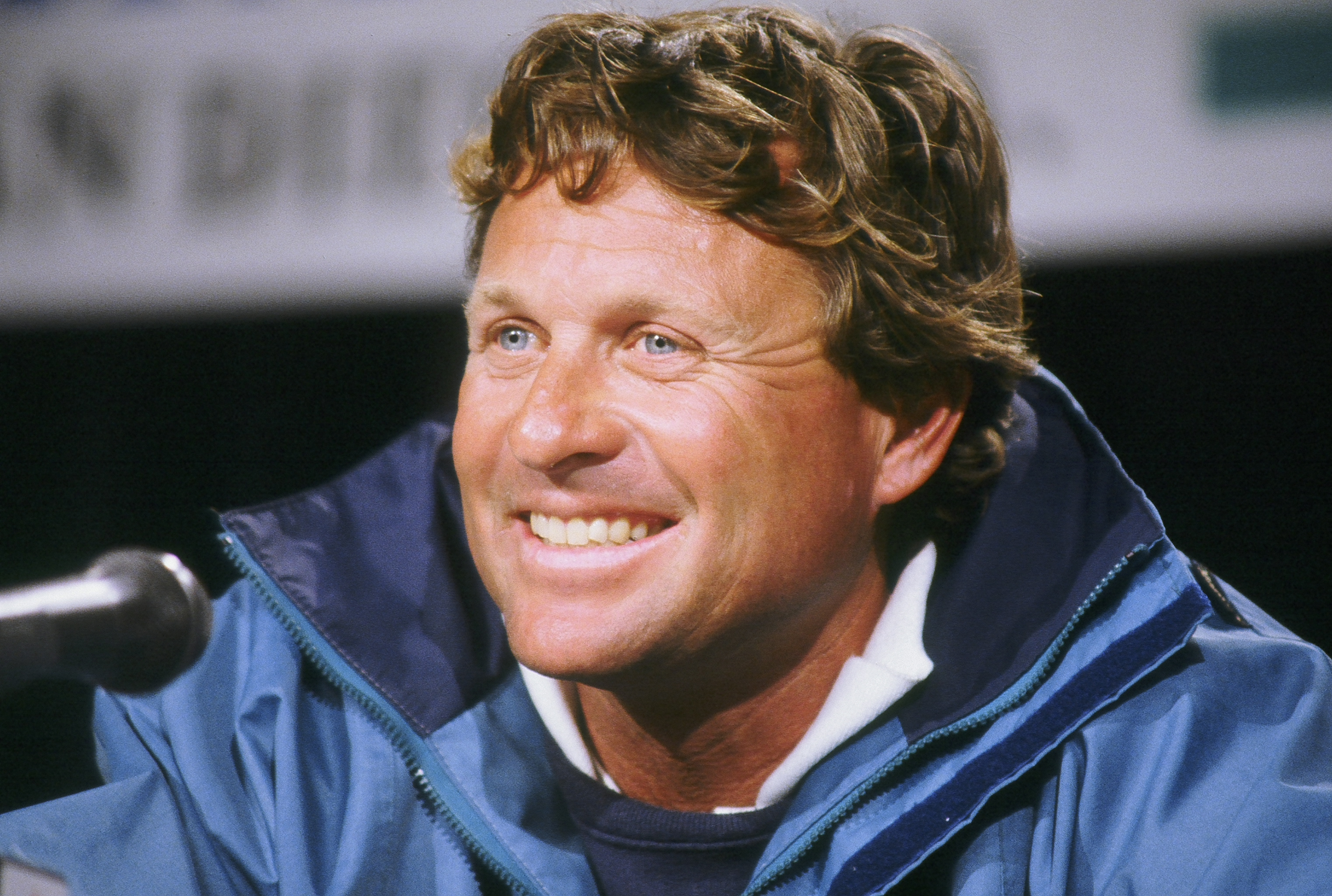
- Davis in San Diego, 2011

Personal information
- Full name: Roderick Hopkins Davis
- Born: August 27, 1955 (age 70) United States
- Height: 182 cm (6 ft 0 in)
- Weight: 87 kg (192 lb)

Sailing career
- Sport: Sailing
- Club: San Diego Yacht Club
- Class: Soling
Medal record
Men's sailing
Olympic Games
Representing the United States
Gold medal – first place	1984 Los Angeles	Soling class
Representing New Zealand
Silver medal – second place	1992 Barcelona	Star class

Roderick Hopkins Davis (born August 27, 1955, in the United States) is a former competitive sailor who won Olympic medals for two countries. At the 1984 Summer Olympics in Los Angeles, representing the United States, he won the gold medal in the Soling class along with Robert Haines and Edward Trevelyan. After moving to New Zealand he was chosen to represent that country at the next three Olympic Games. Along with Don Cowie he won a silver medal at the 1992 Summer Olympics in Barcelona, Spain in the Star class.

Davis and Cowie finished fifth at the 1996 Summer Olympics in Atlanta and were also fifth in the Soling class at Sydney along with 3rd crewman Alan Smith.

Davis began his involvement with the America's Cup in 1977, sailing with Lowell North on Enterprise during the 1977 America's Cup defense trials.

For the 1987 Louis Vuitton Cup, assisted the Consorzio Italia syndicate until he was appointed skipper of the American Eagle Foundation challenge, representing the Newport Harbor Yacht Club.

He joined New Zealand Challenge for the 1988 America's Cup and was their helmsman at the 1992 America's Cup. He was the backup helmsman for oneAustralia at the 1995 Louis Vuitton Cup and acted as the sailing coach of Prada Challenge at the 2000 Louis Vuitton Cup. He remained with Prada Challenge for the 2003 Louis Vuitton Cup, and sailed in the afterguard. He joined Team New Zealand as a coach for the 2007 Louis Vuitton Cup, and remained in this position for the 2013 Louis Vuitton Cup. In 2014 he joined Artemis Racing. He re-joined Team New Zealand in 2016 and was part of their successful 2017 America's Cup campaign.
