= International Soling Association =

- Abbreviation: ISA
- Founded: 1967; 58 years ago
- Affiliation: World Sailing
- Headquarters: España 1262
- Location: San Isidro (BA1642); Buenos Aires, Argentina
- President: Michael Dietzel
- Vice president(s): Nelson Ilha; Peter Hall; Han van Veen
- Secretary: Matias Collins

Official website
- www.soling.com

The International Soling Association (ISA) is the governing body for the Soling class, recognised as an international class by World Sailing. The International Soling Association was founded as soon as the Soling became an international class in 1967. Originally an owners' club, it became a very self-supporting organization who provided great support for the whole Soling community and guarded the Soling one-design during her Olympic tour of duty as well as in the present time.

== Object ==
The object of the ISA is to promote the Soling class throughout the world, to co‐ordinate competition under uniform rules, and to maintain the integrity of the one‐design nature of the class in co‐operation with World Sailing and the national soling associations (NSAs).

== Governance ==
The operation of the ISA is in the hands of the ISA committee and is lay down within a set of rules.

=== ISA Committee ===
1 January 2022 – 31 December 2022

Honorable President: Harald V of Norway; Honorable Members: Felipe VI of Spain; Life Members: (Australia) Barry Hayes; (Denmark) Eggert Benzon; (United Kingdom) Dinny Reed; (United Kingdom) Hamish Loudon; (Germany) Karl Haist; (Hungary) György Wossala; (Switzerland) Jean-Pierre Marmier; (Canada) Peter Hall; (United States) Rose Hoeksema	Executive Committee: President (Germany) Michael Dietzel; Vice-presidents: (Brazil) Nelson Horn Ilha; (Canada) Peter Hall; (Netherlands) Han van Veen; Secretary: (United States) Matias Collins; Treasurer: (Germany) Susanne Küffer; Communication Committee: (United States) David Baum; Championship Committee: (Canada) Peter Hall (Chairman); (Austria) Florian Felzmann; (Canada) Tom Mitchell; (Netherlands) Rudy den Outer; (Hungary) Sándor Varjas; Nominating Committee: (Netherlands) Rudy den Outer (Chairman); (Canada) Peter Hall; Technical Committee: (Netherlands) Bram Soethoudt (Chairman); (Hungary) Laszlo Hegymegi (Chief measurer); (Canada) Manfred Kanter Jr.; (Denmark) Anders Borresen; (Germany) Simon Zeh; (Switzerland) Jean-Pierre Marmier	Elected Members: (Austria) Martin Zeileis; (Brazil) Nelson Horn Ilha; (Canada) Peter Hall; (Spain) Tomas Peuvrel; (Germany) Christian Mack; (Hungary) Sándor Varjas; (Italy) Alberto De Amicis; (Netherlands) Han van Veen; (United States) David Baum; Appointed Members: (Argentina) Alejandro Felix Chometowski; (Austria) Ekkehart Steinhuber; (Brazil) Dennis Koch; (Canada) Manfred Kanter Jr.; (Spain) Carlos Elosegui; (France) François Gombeaud; (United Kingdom) Paul Tully; (Germany) Michael Dietzel; (Germany) Simon Zeh; (Hungary) Kristof Wossala; (Italy) Haakon Haraldsen; (Japan) Kazuo Hanaoka; (Netherlands) Gerben den Hartog; (Netherlands) Theo de Lange; (Norway) Lars Ingeberg; (Ukraine) Serhiy Pichuhin

==== (Past) presidents and secretaries ====
Presidents	Nationality	In office	Secretaries	Nationality	In office
Eggert Benzon	(Denmark)	1967–1972	Eyvin Schiøttz	(Denmark)	1967–1978
Jack Van Dyke	(United States)	1973–1975	Arnold van Altena	(Netherlands)	1978–1978
Geert Bakker	(Netherlands)	1976–1979	Christian Meinich	(Norway)	1978–1979
Ken Berkeley	(Australia)	1980–1982	Dinny Reed (née Symes)	(United Kingdom)	1979–2001
Karl Haist	(West Germany)	1983–1986	Fleur Ainsley	(United Kingdom)	2004–2004
Sam Merrick	(United States)	1987–1990	Matias Collins	(United States)	2004–present
Stuart H. Walker	(United States)	1991–1994			
György Wossala	(Hungary)	1995–1998			
Tony Clare	(United Kingdom)	1999–2002			
Rose Hoeksema	(United States)	2003–2006			
Johan Offermans	(Netherlands)	2007–2014			
Peter Hall	(Canada)	2015–2016			
Michael Dietzel	(Germany)	2017–2022			
Nelson Horn Ilha	(Brazil)	2023–present			

=== Rules ===
The ISA rule set consist of the following documents:

- WS International Soling Class Rules
- ISA Constitution
- ISA Championship Rules
- ISA Ranking Ruling
- ISA Standard Notice of Race
- ISA Standard Sailing Instructions
- ISA Permitted Instruments
- ISA Championship Agreement Form

== National Soling associations ==
As of 2019. there are 24 national Soling associations (NSA) active and there are three countries with individual fleets. Since 1968 over fifty countries (not counting the no longer existing countries like the USSR, Yugoslavia and East-Germany).

=== Current national Soling associations ===
- Asociación Argentina de Soling
- (Australia) Australian International Soling Association
- (Austria) Österreichische Soling Klassenvereinigung
- Belarus Soling Association
- (Brazil) Asociaçäo Brasileira de Soling
- (Canada) Canadian International Soling Association
- (Denmark) Danish International Soling Association
- (France) Association Française de la Classe Soling
- (Germany) Deutsche Soling Klassenvereinigung
- (United Kingdom) British Soling Association
- (Hungary) Hungarian Soling Class Association
- (Italy) Associazione Italiana Soling
- Japan Soling Association
- (Netherlands) Soling Club Nederland
- Norway Soling Association
- (Russia) Russian Soling Association
- Slovakia Soling Association
- (Slovenia) Soling Slovenija
- South Africa National Soling
- (Spain) Spanish Soling Association
- (Sweden) Swedish Soling Association
- (Switzerland) Swiss Soling Association
- Soling Association of Ukraine
- United States Soling Association

=== Current individual fleets ===
- Belgium
- Uruguay

=== Previous national Soling associations ===
- Bahamas
- Bahrain
- Barbados
- Bermuda
- British Virgin Islands
- Chile
- Cyprus
- East Germany
- Egypt
- Estonia
- Fiji
- Finland
- Greece
- India
- Ireland
- Jamaica
- Liechtenstein
- Mexico
- Monaco
- New Zealand
- Pakistan
- Philippines
- Poland
- Portugal
- Puerto Rico
- Soviet Union
- Thailand
- United States Virgin Islands
- Venezuela
- Yugoslavia
- Zimbabwe

=== Previous individual fleets ===
- Gambia
- Gabon

== International trophies ==
=== International championships ===
Under auspices if the ISA the following annual international regattas are organized. These events are open for sailors of all nationalities. For these regattas the ISA championship rules applies. The notice of race and sailing instructions must written be as close as possible to the ISA standard notice of race and the ISA standard sailing instructions and must be approved by the ISA Championship Committee:

- Soling World Championship
- Soling Masters World Championship
- Continental championships
  - Soling European Championship
  - Soling North American Championship
  - Soling South American Championship
- Soling World Trophy

The national Soling associations will organize there national Soling championships and local regattas.
