= Robbie Haines =

American sailor

Personal information
- Full name: Robert Bentley Haines, Jr.
- Born: March 27, 1954 (age 72) San Diego, California, U.S.

Sailing career
- Sport: Sailing
Medal record
Sailing
Representing the United States
Olympic Games
Gold medal – first place	1984 Los Angeles	Soling

Robert Bentley Haines, Jr. (born March 27, 1954) is an American sailor and Olympic champion. Born in San Diego, California, he has won seven world championships in 4 different class of boats. He was associate producer and sailing team manager for the Walt Disney film "Morning Light". He was awarded the Congressional Gold Medal for being a member of the 1980 US Olympic Sailing Team, which did not compete in the Soviet Union (Estonia) due to the boycott of the Olympic Games that year by President Jimmy Carter.

Haines, skipper of the Haines-Trevelyan-Davis team, received a gold medal in the Soling class at the 1984 Summer Olympics in Los Angeles. Haines was inducted into the San Diego Sports Hall of Fame in 2018.
