= Edward Trevelyan =

American sailor

Personal information
- Full name: Edward Norman Trevelyan
- Born: August 14, 1955 (age 70) San Pedro, California, U.S.

Sailing career
- Sport: Sailing
Medal record
Sailing
Representing the United States
Olympic Games
Gold medal – first place	1984 Los Angeles	Soling

Edward Norman Trevelyan (born August 14, 1955) is an American sailor and Olympic champion.

Trevelyan, a member of a team that also included skipper Bob Haines and Rod Davis, received a gold medal in the Soling class at the 1984 Summer Olympics in Los Angeles.
