= Jesper Seier =

Danish sailor (born 1965)

Medal record

Men's sailing

Representing Denmark

Olympic Games
Gold medal – first place	1992 Barcelona	Soling class

Jesper Seier (born 21 September 1965) is a Danish sailor and Olympic champion.

He won a gold medal in the Soling class at the 1992 Summer Olympics in Barcelona, together with Jesper Bank and Steen Secher.
