= Bjørn Westergaard =

Danish sailor

Bjørn Westergaard (born 12 September 1962, in Esbjerg) is a Danish sailor in the Finn and Soling classes, who finished 21st in the 1996 Summer Olympics and is the brother of Stig Westergaard.
