= Jim Brady (sailor) =

American sailor (born 1963)

Personal information
- Full name: James H. Brady
- Born: June 27, 1963 (age 63) Tampa, Florida, U.S.

Sport
- Club: New York Yacht Club
Medal record
Men's sailing
Representing the United States
Olympic Games
Silver medal – second place	1992 Barcelona	Soling class

James H. Brady (born June 27, 1963) is an American former competitive sailor who won a silver medal at the 1992 Olympic Games in Barcelona.

== Career ==
Brady was awarded the Rolex Yachtsman of the Year award in 1990.

At the 1992 Summer Olympics, Brady finished in 2nd place in the soling class along with his partners Kevin Mahaney and Doug Kern. After the Barcelona Olympics, Brady competed as navigator for Dennis Conner on Team Stars & Stripes in the 1995 America’s Cup and as tactician on Young America during the 2000 Louis Vuitton Cup.

In 1997 he co-founded The Olympia Companies with former Olympic sailing partner Kevin Mahaney, focusing on real estate development.

He currently resides in Portland, Maine. He was President of RED Group, LLC, a real estate development company focused on mixed use and hospitality developments. He is currently the President and director of Fathom Cos., Portland, ME.

At the 1992 Barcelona Olympics, Brady met Julia Trotman, an Olympic bronze medalist, and they later married and had two daughters. They divorced in 2021.
