= Doug Kern =

American sailor (born 1963)

Personal information
- Full name: Douglas James Kern
- Nickname: Doug
- Born: July 10, 1963 (age 63) Fort Riley, Kansas, U.S.

Sport
- Club: Austin Yacht Club
Medal record
Men's sailing
Representing the United States
Olympic Games
Silver medal – second place	1992 Barcelona	Soling class

Douglas James Kern (born July 10, 1963) is an American former competitive sailor who won a silver medal at the 1992 Olympic Games in Barcelona.

== Personal life ==
Kern lives in Austin, Texas.

== Career ==
At the 1992 Summer Olympics, Kern finished in 2nd place in the soling class along with his partners Jim Brady and Kevin Mahaney. Kern currently creates marketing platforms.
