= Kevin Mahaney =

American sailor (born 1962)

Personal information
- Born: March 31, 1962 (age 64) Bangor, Maine, U.S.
- Education: Middlebury College, University of Chicago

Sport
- Club: Austin Yacht Club
Medal record
Men's sailing
Representing the United States
Olympic Games
Silver medal – second place	1992 Barcelona	Soling class

Kevin P. Mahaney (born March 31, 1962, in Bangor, Maine) is an American commercial real estate developer as well as a former competitive sailor who won a silver medal at the 1992 Olympic Games in Barcelona. He resides in Maine.

== Education ==
Mahaney graduated from Middlebury College in 1984. He received an MBA from the University of Chicago Graduate School of Business in 1987. In 2007, the Middlebury College Center for the Arts (CFA) was renamed the Mahaney Center for the Arts.

== Career ==
At the 1992 Summer Olympics, Mahaney finished in 2nd place in the soling class along with his partners Jim Brady and Doug Kern. Mahaney is the president and CEO of the Olympia Companies, a real estate development firm based out of Portland, Maine. He is also the CEO of I-Comm Connect, LLC, a software company.
