= Ingo Borkowski =

German sailor (born 1971)

Medal record

Sailing

Representing Germany

Olympic Games
Silver medal – second place	2000 Sydney	Soling class

Ingo Borkowski (born 2 October 1971) is a German sailor. He won a silver medal in the Soling class with Jochen Schümann and Gunnar Bahr at the 2000 Summer Olympics.
