= Georgy Shayduko =

Russian sailor (1962–2023)

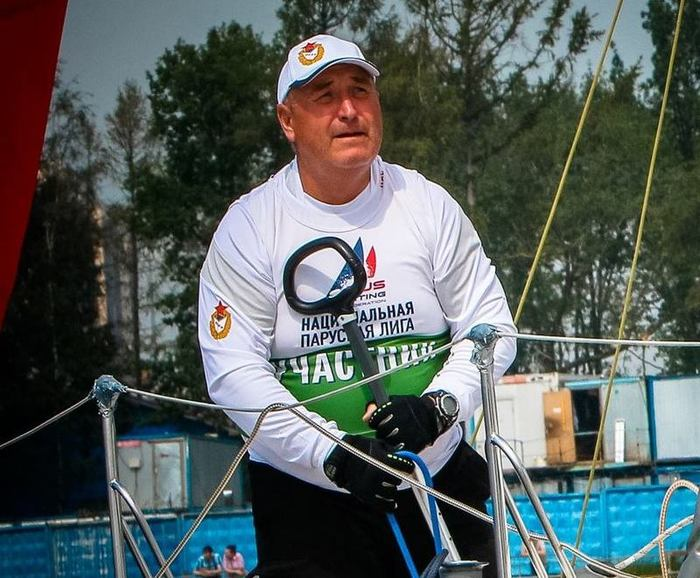

Personal information
- Full name: Georgy Ivanovich Shayduko
- Nationality: Russian
- Born: 6 August 1962 Nikopol, Ukrainian SSR, Soviet Union
- Died: 8 January 2023 (aged 60)

Sailing career
- Sport: Sailing
- Class(es): Flying Dutchman; Soling
Medal record
Men's sailing
Representing Russia
Olympic Games
Silver medal – second place	1996 Atlanta	Soling class
- Updated on 11 January 2023

Georgy Ivanovich Shayduko (Russian: Георгий Иванович Шайдуко; 6 August 1962 – 8 January 2023) was a Russian Olympic sailor. Shayduko was born in Nikopol on 6 August 1962. He won silver medal in the Soling class at 1996 Summer Olympics. Shayduko died of a cardiac arrest on 9 January 2023, at the age of 60.
