= Thomas Flach =

German sailor

Personal information
- Nationality: German
- Born: 3 June 1956 (age 70) Potsdam, Brandenburg
- Height: 186 cm (6 ft 1 in)
- Weight: 95 kg (209 lb)

Sailing career
- Sport: Sailing
- Club: SC Berlin-Grünau, Berlin
- Class: Soling
Medal record
Olympic Games
Representing East Germany
Gold medal – first place	1988 Seoul	Soling class
Representing Germany
Gold medal – first place	1996 Atlanta	Soling class

Thomas Flach (born 3 June 1956) is a German sailor and Olympic champion, born in Potsdam. He competed in the Soling class together with Jochen Schümann and Bernd Jäkel at the 1988 Summer Olympics in Seoul, where they won the gold medal. The same crew participated at the 1996 Summer Olympics in Atlanta, where they also received a gold medal.
