= Bernd Jäkel =

German sailor

Personal information
- Nationality: German
- Born: 1 May 1954 (age 72) Berlin
- Height: 179 cm (5 ft 10 in)
- Weight: 89 kg (196 lb)

Sailing career
- Sport: Sailing
- Club: SC Berlin-Grünau, Berlin
- Class: Soling
Medal record
Olympic Games
Representing East Germany
Gold medal – first place	1988 Seoul	Soling class
Representing Germany
Gold medal – first place	1996 Atlanta	Soling class

Bernd Jäkel (born 1 May 1954) is a German sailor and Olympic champion. He competed in the Soling class together with Jochen Schümann and Thomas Flach at the 1988 Summer Olympics in Seoul, where they won the gold medal. The same crew participated at the 1996 Summer Olympics in Atlanta, where they also received a gold medal.
