= Igor Skalin =

Russian sailor

Personal information
- Full name: Igor Anatolyevich Skalin
- Nationality: Russian
- Born: 12 January 1970 (age 56) Moscow, Russia
- Height: 190 cm (6 ft 3 in)
- Weight: 104 kg (229 lb)

Sailing career
- Sport: Sailing
- Class: Soling
Medal record
Men's sailing
Representing Russia
Olympic Games
Silver medal – second place	1996 Atlanta	Soling class

Igor Anatolyevich Skalin (Russian: Игорь Анатольевич Скалин, born 12 January 1970) is an Olympic sailor. He won silver medal in the Soling class at 1996 Summer Olympics.
