= Gunnar Bahr =

German sailor

Medal record

Sailing

Representing Germany

Olympic Games
Silver medal – second place	2000 Sydney	Soling class

Gunnar Bahr (born 21 October 1974) is a German sailor who won a silver medal in the Soling class with Jochen Schümann and Ingo Borkowski at the 2000 Summer Olympics. He was decorated on 2 February 2001 by the President of the Federal Republic of Germany, Johannes Rau, with the Silver Laurel Leaf.
