= Robert Billingham =

American sailor (1957–2014)

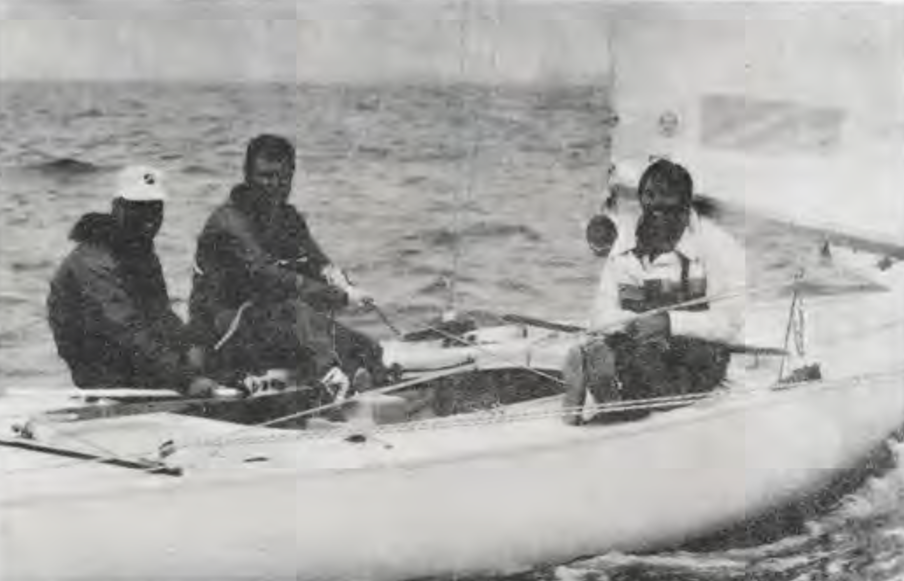
- John Kostecki, Robert Billingham, William Baylis

Personal information
- Full name: Robert Iain Colin Billingham
- Nationality: United States
- Born: 10 December 1957 London, England, United Kingdom
- Died: March 30, 2014 (aged 56)
- Education: Amherst College
Medal record
Men's sailing
Representing the United States
Olympic Games
Silver medal – second place	1988 Seoul	Soling class

Robert Iain Colin "Bob" Billingham (December 10, 1957 – March 30, 2014) was an American competitive sailor and Olympic silver medalist. Billingham was born in London, England. At the 1988 Summer Olympics, Billingham finished in second place in the soling class along with his partners John Kostecki and William Baylis. Billingham graduated from Amherst College (1979).
