= William Baylis =

American sailor (born 1962)

Personal information
- Full name: William Henry Baylis
- Born: April 15, 1962 (age 64) San Francisco, California, U.S.
Medal record
Men's sailing
Representing the United States
Olympic Games
Silver medal – second place	1988 Seoul	Soling class

William Henry Baylis (born April 15, 1962, in San Francisco, California) is an American former competitive sailor and Olympic silver medalist. At the 1988 Summer Olympics, Baylis finished in 2nd place in the soling class along with his partners John Kostecki and Robert Billingham.
