= John Kerr (sailor) =

Canadian sailor (born 1951)

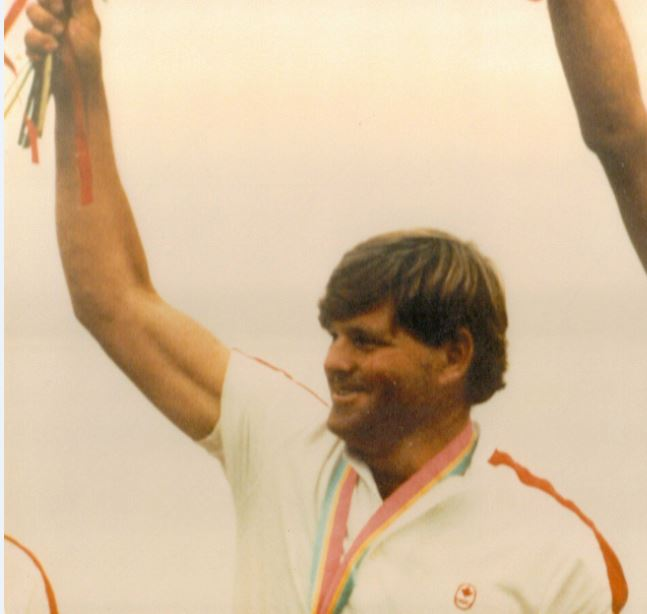
- Medal ceremony Los Angeles 1984. Medal presented by King Constantine of Greece

Personal information
- Born: August 9, 1951 (age 75) Toronto, Ontario, Canada

Sport
- Sport: Men's sailing
Medal record
Men's sailing
Representing Canada
Olympic Games
Bronze medal – third place	1984 Los Angeles	Soling
World Championships
Bronze medal – third place	1978 Rio de Janeiro	Soling
North American Championships
Gold medal – first place	1984 Kingston	Soling class

John Kerr (born August 9, 1951) is a Canadian sailor and publisher. He graduated from the University of Western Ontario in 1973.

== Results ==
- 1972 Canadian Olympic Trials (Halifax) 4th (crew: William Abbott Sr, Billy Abbott, John Kerr)
- 1973 Canadian Champion 1st (crew: Hans Fogh John Kerr, Dennis Toews)
- 1973 Fall Annapolis Soling Bowl (crew: Hans Fogh John Kerr, Dennis Toews)
- 1973 Great Lakes Championship 2nd (crew: Hans Fogh John Kerr, Dennis Toews)
- 1973 Atlantic Coast Championship 1st (crew: Hans Fogh John Kerr, Dennis Toews)
- 1974 Canadian Champion 1st (crew: Hans Fogh John Kerr, Dennis Toews)
- 1975 Canada's Cup Crew (Marauder, RCYC)
- 1975 Canadian Championship 1st (crew: Paul Henderson, Dennis Toews, John Kerr)
- 1976 Soling Worlds (crew: Paul Henderson, Dennis Toews, John Kerr)
- 1976 Canadian Olympic Trials 2nd (crew: Paul Henderson, Dennis Toews, John Kerr)
- 1977 North American Championships (crew:Hans Fogh John Kerr, Dennis Toews)
- 1978 European Championship 1st (crew: Hans Fogh John Kerr, Dennis Toews)
- 1978 Canadian Champion 1st (crew: Hans Fogh John Kerr, Dennis Toews)
- 1978 Kieler Woche Championship 1st (crew: Hans Fogh John Kerr, Dennis Toews)
- 1978 Coupe du Monde 1st (crew: Hans Fogh John Kerr, Dennis Toews)
- 1978 Canada's Cup Challenger (Mia RCYC), runner up Crew
- 1981 Canadian Champion 1st (crew: Hans Fogh John Kerr, Steve Calder)
- 1982 Canadian Champion 1st (crew: Hans Fogh John Kerr, Steve Calder)
- 1982 European Championship 1st (crew: Hans Fogh, Pol Richard Jensen, John Kerr)
- 1982 Coupe du Monde 1st (crew: Hans Fogh John Kerr, Steve Calder)
- 1983 European Championship 1st (crew: Hans Fogh, John Kerr, Steve Calder)
- 1983 Coupe du Monde 1st (crew: Hans Fogh, John Kerr, Steve Calder)
- 1983 Pre-Olympics Los Angeles 2nd (crew Hans Fogh, John Kerr, Steve Calder)
- 1984 North American Championships Kingston, Ontario 1st (crew Hans Fogh, John Kerr, Steve Calder)
- 1984 Olympic Games Los Angeles, Bronze Medal (crew: Hans Fogh, John Kerr, Steve Calder)
- 1996 World Championships 6th (Crew: Hans Fogh, Thomas Fogh, John Kerr)
- 2003 Fall Soling Bowl (Annapolis) (Crew Hans Fogh, John Kerr, Hank Lammens)
- 2005 North American Championship 2nd (crew: Hans Fogh, John Kerr, Roger Cheer)
- 2007 Canadian Etchells Champion 1st (crew: Hans Fogh, Thomas Fogh, John Kerr)
- 2011 North American Championships 3rd (crew: Hans Fogh John Kerr, Roger Cheer )
- 2019 Inaugurated Canadian Sailing Hall of Fame Kingston, Ontario, Canada

== Business career ==
Kerrwil Publications Limited logo

Kerr started his business career part-time with Howdens Electric (now Westburne / Rexel) and then, after graduating from the University of Western Ontario he joined Canadian Chromalox. Kerr moved to Elvstrom Sails and Fogh Sails in Toronto working with Hans Fogh and John Eastwood and then held the position of Director of Marketing with North Sails Fogh after North Sails acquired Fogh Sails. Moving to the family publishing business Kerr joined Kerrwil Publications Limited in 1980 he has held various positions to his current role of President and CEO. At Kerrwil he founded and established numerous business-to-business and trade titles including CAD CAM & Robotics, Manufacturing Automation, Machinery Technology, Structured Cabling, Lighting and Plastics Business. In 1985 Kerr acquired Canadian Yachting and Power Illustrated from MacLean Hunter. In 1988 he led the formation of an international network of Plastics magazines and followed with an alliance in the electrical industry representing Electrical Construction & Maintenance and Electrical Wholesaling. In 1986 Kerr started the research of the Electrical Market with the Pathfinder Report. Kerr established Kerrwil Millennium in the United Kingdom with Geoff Ide to publish Structured Cabling Europe in 1998.

In his role with Kerrwil he established Pathfinder "Canada's electrical industry benchmarking study" that reports and measures the Canadian electrical channel.

In 2014 Kerr established Electrical Industry.ca a network of electrical B2B web sites serving the electrical industry, including Electrical Industry News Week, Le Monde de L'électricité, a title Kerrwil reacquired from Transcontinental Publishing), Canadian Electrical Wholesaler, Lighting Design and Specification, Drives and Control Solutions and Panel Builder and Systems Integrator and Mechatronics.. In 2020 Kerr established Kerrwil EMG in Raleigh North Carolina to launch Panelbuilder US and Robotics World. In 2022 Kerr collaborated with David Gordon of Channel Marketing group to launch US Lighting Trends.

Kerr has worked outside the family firm with Laurentian Publishing, Page Publishing, LinkPATH Internet Network Corporation and Web Offset Publications (now Renaissance Printing), IP Group international (an electrical industry consulting firm founded by Paul Eitmant) and advised Thomas Publishing in the USA. Prior to his publishing Career, Kerr worked in the electrical industry with Howdens Electric ( now Rexel), London Ontario and Canadian Chromalox and then alongside Hans Fogh at Elvstrom Sails and North Sails Fogh.

Kerr has chaired the Canadian Business Press twice (1990- 1992) and most recently 2012-2017 helping the association align with Magazines Canada. He sat on the board of BPA International from 1995 to 2001 and was involved in the merging of the Canadian Circulations Audit board with BPA Worldwide.

== Volunteering ==
1990–1996 Director Canadian Yachting Association, 2009–2015 Director Canadian Yachting Association/SAIL Canada, 2010 -2019 A session Member, member Audit Committee, Canadian Olympic Committee,
