= Carl Auteried Jr. =

Austrian sailor (1943–2025)

Personal information
- Nationality: Austrian
- Born: 31 October 1943; Vienna, Germany
- Died: 23 July 2025 (aged 81); Mondsee, Austria

Sport
- Sport: Sailing

Carl Auteried Jr. (31 October 1943 – 23 July 2025) was an Austrian sailor. He competed in the Tempest event at the 1976 Summer Olympics. Auteried died on 25 July 2025, at the age of 81.
