= Károly Vezér =

Olympic sailor from Hungary

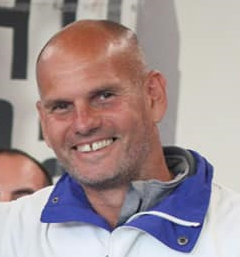
- At the Soling Europeans 2021

Personal information
- Nationality: Hungary
- Born: 5 December 1969 (age 56) Budapest, Hungary
- Height: 1.80 m (5.9 ft)

Sport

Sailing career
- Class: Soling
- Club: BKV Előre SC
- Updated on 1 March 2020

Károly Vezér (born 5 December 1969) is a sailor from Budapest, Hungary. who represented his country at the 1996 Summer Olympics in Savannah, United States as crew member in the Soling. With helmsman György Wossala and fellow crew member László Kovácsi they took the 20th place.
