= György Wossala =

Olympic sailor from Hungary

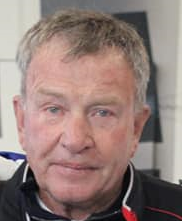
- At the Soling Europeans 2021

Personal information
- Born: 7 November 1941 (age 84) Budapest, Hungary
- Height: 1.80 m (5.9 ft)

Sailing career
- Sport: Sailing
- Club: BKV Előre SC
- Class: Soling
- Updated on 1 March 2020

György Wossala (born 7 November 1941 Budapest) is a sailor from Hungary, who represented his country at the 1996 Summer Olympics in Savannah, United States as helmsman in the Soling. With crew members László Kovácsi and Károly Vezér they took the 20th place.

Wossala held several positions within the sport of sailing. This includes the vice-presidency of ISAF, the Hungarian Yachting Association. He was president of the International Soling Association (1995–1998).

Sporting positions
Preceded by (United States) Stuart H. Walker	President International Soling Association; 1995–1998	Succeeded by (United Kingdom) Tony Clair
