= László Kovácsi =

Olympic sailor from Hungary

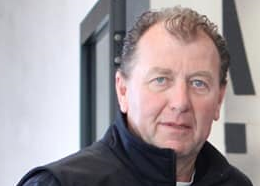
- At the Soling Europeans 2021

Personal information
- Nationality: Hungary
- Born: 12 April 1958 (age 67) Budapest
- Height: 1.90 m (6.2 ft)

Sport

Sailing career
- Class: Soling
- Club: BKV Előre SC
- Updated on 1 March 2020

László Kovácsi (born 12 April 1958) is a sailor from Budapest, Hungary. who represented his country at the 1996 Summer Olympics in Savannah, United States as crew member in the Soling. With helmsman György Wossala and fellow crew member Károly Vezér they took the 20th place.
