= Serhiy Pichuhin =

Ukrainian sailor

Personal information
- Native name: Сергій Вячеславович Пічугін
- Full name: Serhiy Viacheslavovych Pichuhin
- Born: 13 March 1961 (age 65) Kyiv, Ukrainian SSR

Sailing career
- Sport: Sailing
- Class: Soling
Medal record
World Championships
Gold medal – first place	2003 Balaton	Soling
Bronze medal – third place	1998 Milwaukee	Soling
Bronze medal – third place	2000 Murcia	Soling

Serhiy Vyacheslavovych Pichuhin (Ukrainian: Сергій В'ячеславович Пічугін; born 13 March 1961) is a Ukrainian Olympics sailor. Pichuhin represented the Unified Team in the 1992 Summer Olympics and Ukraine in the 1996 and 2000 Summer Olympics. Pichuchin also won the Soling World Championship in 2003, and finished second in 1998 and 2000 editions.
