= Jesper Bank =

Danish sailor and Olympic champion

Medal record

Men's sailing

Representing Denmark

Olympic Games
Gold medal – first place	1992 Barcelona	Soling class
Gold medal – first place	2000 Sydney	Soling class
Bronze medal – third place	1988 Seoul	Soling class

Jesper Bank (born 6 April 1957 in Fredericia) is a Danish sailor and Olympic champion. He received a bronze medal in the Soling class at the 1988 Summer Olympics in Seoul.

He won a gold medal at the 1992 Summer Olympics in Barcelona, and again at the 2000 Summer Olympics in Sydney.

This makes Jesper Bank among the most winning regatta and match-race sailors seen. Between 1978 (nationally) relatively 1987 (internationally) and 2000 achieved he to be:

- Twice Olympic champion and additional one time bronze medallist.
- 8 times World champion and additional 5 times medallist.
- 3 times European Champion and additional 3 times medallist.
- Scandinavian Champion and additional two times bronze medallist.
- 9 times national Danish Champion and additional a single bronze medal.

The international and some national results though as skipper in 3-crew boat classes.

He sailed for Victory Challenge in the 2003 Louis Vuitton Cup and United Internet Team Germany in the 2007 Louis Vuitton Cup.

After his career in sports he has been producing sails and has widely been used as sailing advisor by teams on all levels as well as single sailors.
