= Sailing at the 1972 Summer Olympics – Dragon =

Dragon at the Games of the XX Olympiad
- Line drawing of the Dragon
- Venue: Kiel-Schilksee (Olympiazentrum)
- Dates: First race: 29 August 1972; Last race: 8 September 1972
- Competitors: 70 from 23 nations
- Teams: 23

Medalists
1st place, gold medalist(s)		John Cuneo; Thomas Anderson; John Shaw	Australia
2nd place, silver medalist(s)		Paul Borowski; Konrad Weichert; Karl–Heinz Thun	East Germany
3rd place, bronze medalist(s)		Donald Cohan; Charles Horter; John Marshall	United States

The Dragon was a sailing event on the Sailing at the 1972 Summer Olympics program in Kiel-Schilksee. Seven races were scheduled. Only six races were sailed due to weather conditions. 70 sailors, on 23 boats, from 23 nation competed. It was the last Olympic appearance of the Dragon.

== Race schedule ==
Because of insufficient wind the scheduled race in the Dragon was postponed on 5 September 1972. Due to the interruption of the Games on 6 September 1972, the race was postponed till 7 September. Then the race conditions were unsuitable. Heavy fog and poor wind conditions made it not possible to race until 8 September. Finally for the Dragon only six regattas took place. Also the medal ceremony was also postponed until 8 September.

●	Event competitions	●	Event finals

Date	August						September										
Date	26th Sat	27th Sun	28th Mon	29th Tue	30th Wed	31st Thu	1st Fri	2nd Sat	3rd Sun	4th Mon	5th Tue	6th Wed	7th Thu	8th Fri	9th Sat	10th Sun	11th Mon
Dragon (planning)				●	●	●	●	Spare day	Spare day	●	●	●	Spare day	Spare day			
Dragon (actual)				●	●	●	●	Spare day	Spare day	●	No wind		Fog	●			

== Course area and course configuration ==
For the Dragon course area A (Alpha) was used. The location (54°29'50'’N, 10°22'00'’E) points to the center of the 2 nm radius circle. The distance between mark 1 and 3 was about 2nm.

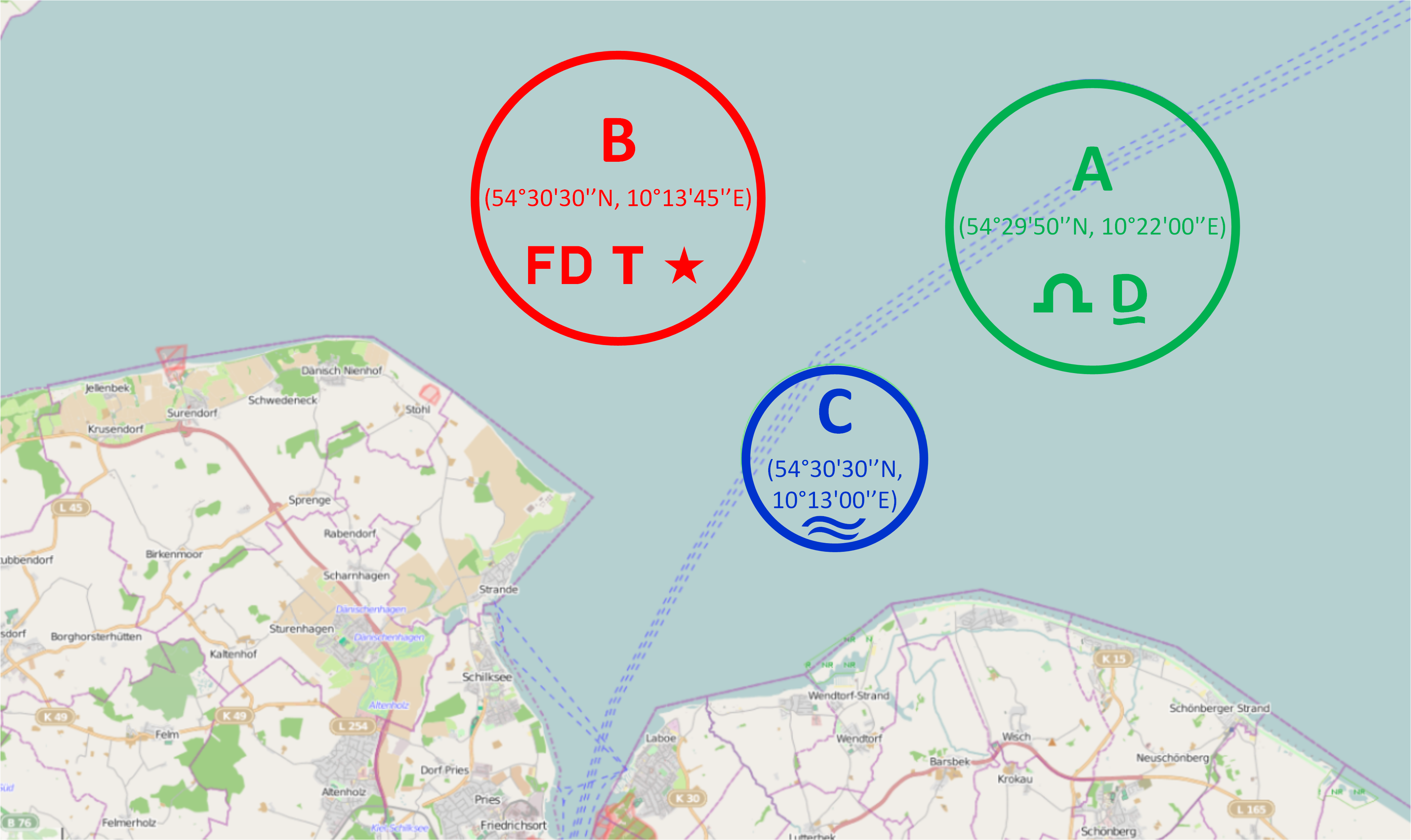

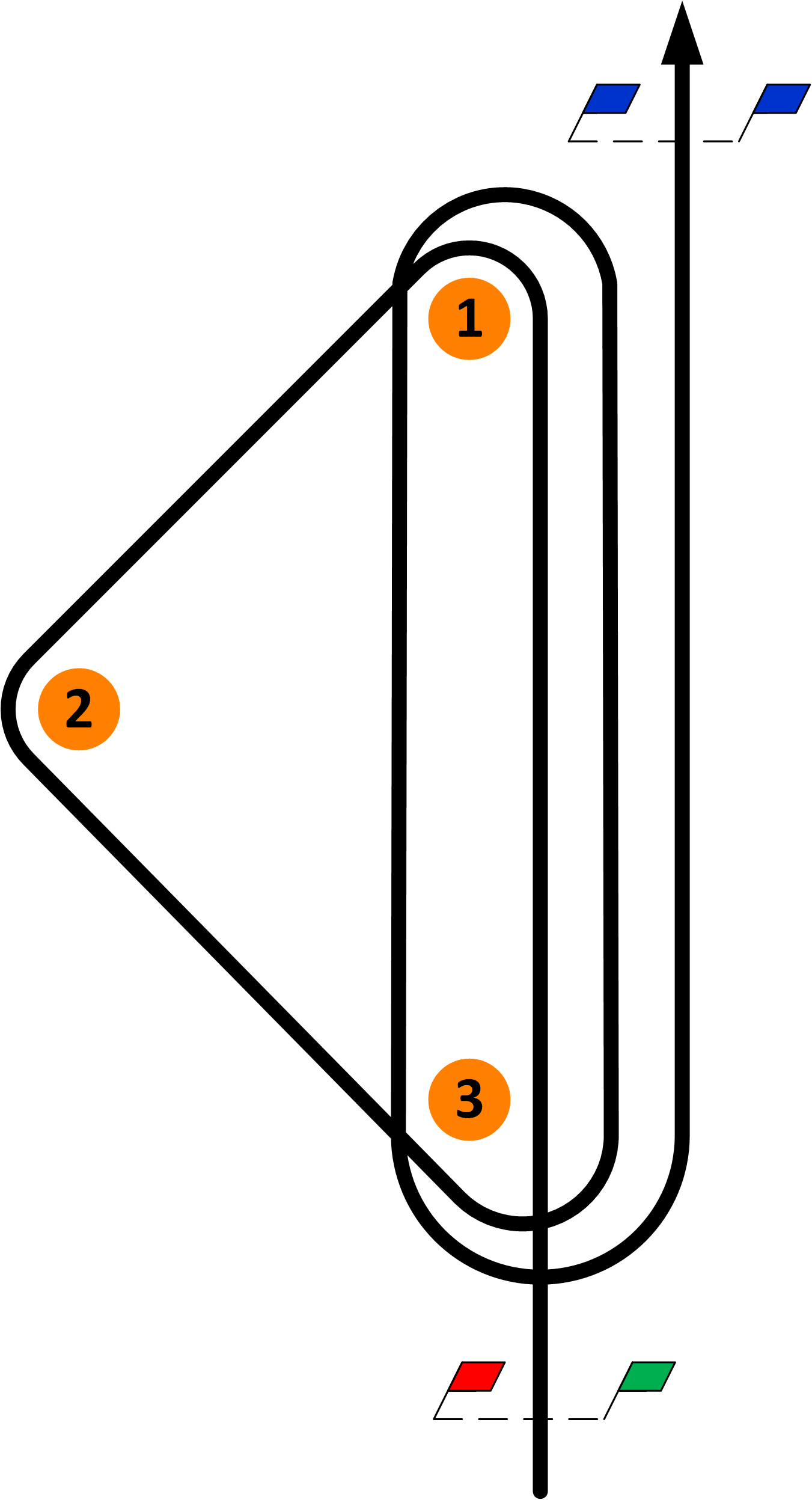

== Final results ==
These are the results of the Dragon event.

Rank	Country	Helmsman	Crew	Race 1		Race 2		Race 3		Race 4		Race 5		Race 6		Total	Total – discard
Rank	Country	Helmsman	Crew	Pos.	Pts.	Pos.	Pts.	Pos.	Pts.	Pos.	Pts.	Pos.	Pts.	Pos.	Pts.	Total	Total – discard
1st place, gold medalist(s)	Australia	John Cuneo	Thomas Anderson; John Shaw	1	0.0	1	0.0	1	0.0	~~19~~	~~25.0~~	3	5.7	4	8.0	38.7	13.7
2nd place, silver medalist(s)	East Germany	Paul Borowski	Karl-Heinz Thun; Konrad Weichert	~~12~~	~~18.0~~	8	14.0	8	14.0	1	0.0	4	8.0	3	5.7	59.7	41.7
3rd place, bronze medalist(s)	United States	Donald Cohan	Charles Horter; John Marshall	4	8.0	~~12~~	~~18.0~~	5	10.0	6	11.7	1	0.0	12	18.0	65.7	47.7
4	West Germany	Franz Heilmeier	Richard Kuchler; Konrad Glas	2	3.0	4	8.0	~~20~~	~~26.0~~	3	5.7	11	17.0	8	14.0	73.7	47.7
5	New Zealand	Ronald Watson	Noel Everett; Fraser Beer	8	14.0	13	19.0	~~15~~	~~21.0~~	9	15.0	2	3.0	1	0.0	72.0	51.0
6	Sweden	Jörgen Sundelin	Peter Sundelin; Ulf Sundelin	3	5.7	~~20~~	~~26.0~~	3	5.7	16	22.0	13	19.0	9	15.0	93.4	67.4
7	Denmark	Poul Richard Høj Jensen	Frank Høj Jensen; Gunnar Dahlgaard	17	23.0	~~19~~	~~25.0~~	9	15.0	11	17.0	5	10.0	2	3.0	93.0	68.0
8	Finland	Kurt Nyman	Antero Sotamaa; Göran Schaumann	~~21~~	~~27.0~~	3	5.7	7	13.0	8	14.0	8	14.0	16	22.0	95.7	68.7
9	Canada	Allan Leibel	Frank Hall; Neil Gunn	5	10.0	10	16.0	2	3.0	10	16.0	~~DSQ~~	~~32.0~~	18	24.0	101.0	69.0
10	Austria	Harald Fereberger	Franz Eisl; Karl Stangl	9	16.0	6	11.7	13	19.0	5	10.0	10	16.0	~~17~~	~~23.0~~	94.7	71.7
11	Norway	Teddy Sommerschield	Sven Gerner-Mathisen; Jan-Erik Aarberg	~~16~~	~~22.0~~	5	10.0	12	18.0	15	21.0	6	11.7	7	13.0	95.7	73.7
12	Great Britain	Simon Tait	Ian Hannay; Alistair Currey	6	11.7	2	3.0	~~19~~	~~25.0~~	17	23.0	14	20.0	15	21.0	103.7	78.7
13	Bermuda	Eugene Simmons	James Amos; Richard Belvin	14	20.0	15	21.0	16	22.0	4	8.0	~~18~~	~~24.0~~	6	11.7	106.7	82.7
14	Soviet Union	Boris Khabarov	Vladimir Yakovlev (sailor); Nikolay Gromov	~~18~~	~~24.0~~	9	15.0	6	11.7	14	20.0	16	22.0	10	16.0	108.7	84.7
15	Spain	Sar Juan Carlos de Borbon	Gonzalo Fernández de Córdoba Larios; Félix Gancedo	11	17.0	11	17.0	4	8.0	~~20~~	~~26.0~~	20	26.0	11	17.0	111.0	85.0
16	Ireland	Robin Hennessy	Treen Morris; Harry Byrne, Joe McMenamin	10	16.0	16	22.0	~~22~~	~~28.0~~	7	13.0	9	15.0	19	25.0	117.0	89.0
17	Greece	Ioannis Giapalakis	Panagiotis Mikhail; Ioannis Kiousis	13	19.0	7	13.0	10	16.0	~~18~~	~~24.0~~	17	23.0	14	20.0	115.0	91.0
18	France	René Sence	Patrick Rieupeyrout; François Girard	15	21.0	~~22~~	~~28.0~~	14	20.0	13	19.0	7	13.0	13	19.0	120.0	92.0
19	Bahamas	Godfrey Kelly	Christopher McKinney; David Albert Kelly	~~23~~	~~29.0~~	17	23.0	18	24.0	12	18.0	15	21.0	5	10.0	125.0	96.0
20	Poland	Lech Poklewski	Tadeusz Piotrowski; Aleksander Bielaczyc	20	26.0	21	27.0	17	23.0	2	3.0	~~22~~	~~28.0~~	21	27.0	134.0	106.0
21	Portugal	Mário Quina	Francisco Quina; Fernando Lima Bello	22	28.0	16	22.0	11	17.0	~~23~~	~~29.0~~	19	25.0	22	28.0	149.0	120.0
22	Jamaica	Michael Keith Nunes	John Burrowes; Michael Anthony Nunes	7	13.0	18	24.0	~~23~~	~~29.0~~	22	28.0	21	27.0	23	29.0	150.0	121.0
23	Argentina	Jorge Salas Chávez	César Sebök; Pedro Oscar Sisti	19	25.0	~~DSQ~~	~~32.0~~	21	27.0	21	27.0	12	18.0	20	26.0	155.0	123.0

Legend: DSQ – Disqualified;
Discard is crossed out and does not count for the overall result.
Gender: – male; – female;

== Daily standings ==
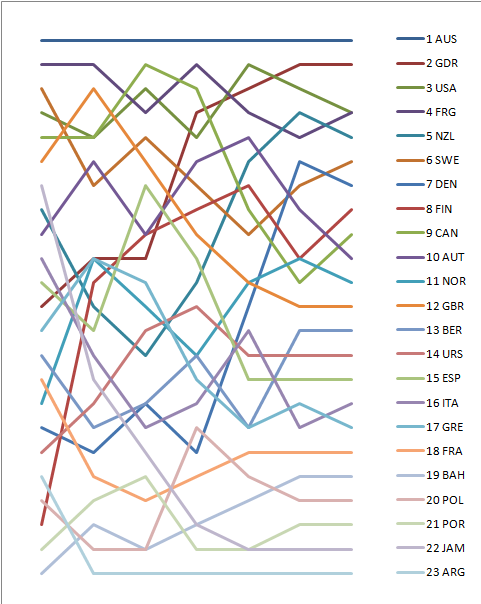
Graph showing the daily standings in the Dragon during the 1972 Summer Olympics
