= Sailing at the 1968 Summer Olympics – Dragon =

Sailing at the Olympics

Dragon at the Games of the XIX Olympiad
- Venue: Acapulco
- Dates: 14–21 October
- Competitors: 71 from 23 nations
- Teams: 23

Medalists
1st place, gold medalist(s)		George Friedrichs; Barton Jahncke; Gerald Schreck	United States
2nd place, silver medalist(s)		Aage Birch; Paul Lindemark Jørgensen; Niels Markussen	Denmark
3rd place, bronze medalist(s)		Paul Borowski; Karl-Heinz Thun; Konrad Weichert	East Germany

The Dragon was a sailing event on the Sailing at the 1968 Summer Olympics program in Acapulco. Seven races were scheduled. 71 sailors, on 23 boats, from 23 nations competed.

== Results ==
Rank	Helmsman (Country)	Crew	Country Code	Race I		Race II		Race III		Race IV		Race V		Race VI		Race VII		Total Points	Total -1
Rank	Helmsman (Country)	Crew	Country Code	Rank	Points	Rank	Points	Rank	Points	Rank	Points	Rank	Points	Rank	Points	Rank	Points	Total Points	Total -1
1st place, gold medalist(s)	George Friedrichs (USA)	Barton Jahncke; Gerald Schreck	US	2	3	~~6~~	~~11.7~~	1	0	1	0	2	3	1	0	1	0	17.7	6
2nd place, silver medalist(s)	Aage Birch (DEN)	Paul Lindemark Jørgensen; Niels Markussen	D	6	11.7	1	0	2	3	~~10~~	~~16~~	3	5.7	2	3	2	3	42.4	26.4
3rd place, bronze medalist(s)	Paul Borowski (GDR)	Karl-Heinz Thun; Konrad Weichert	GO	1	0	2	3	3	5.7	4	8	4	8	~~6~~	~~11.7~~	4	8	44.4	32.7
4	Steve Tupper (CAN)	Dave Miller; Tim Irwin	KC	3	5.7	8	14	~~13~~	~~19~~	6	11.7	8	14	7	13	3	5.7	83.1	64.1
5	John Cuneo (AUS)	Thomas Anderson; John Ferguson	KA	8	14	4	8	9	15	2	3	5	10	~~11~~	~~17~~	9	15	82	65
6	Gunnar Broberg (SWE)	Lennart Eisner; Sven Hanson, Bengt Palmquist, Pelle Petterson	S	7	13	~~11~~	~~17~~	5	10	9	15	6	11.7	5	10	6	11.7	88.4	71.4
7	Klaus Oldendorff (FRG)	Peter Stülcken; Axel May	G	~~16~~	~~22~~	5	10	14	20	8	14	1	0	4	8	16	22	96	74
8	Michel Briand (FRA)	Michel Alexandre; Pierre Blanchard	F	13	19	3	5.7	12	18	17	23	7	13	3	5.7	~~14~~	~~20~~	104.4	81.4
9	Luis Schenone (ARG)	Boris Belada; Pedro Sisti	A	~~15~~	~~21~~	9	15	7	13	5	10	17	23	10	16	11	17	115	92
10	Cor Groot (NED)	Jan Bol; Pieter de Zwart	H	10	16	~~DNF~~	~~28~~	18	24	3	5.7	11	17	13	19	7	13	122.7	94.7
11	Yury Anisimov (URS)	Valery Ruzhnikov; Valery Afanasyev	SR	12	18	7	13	4	8	13	19	14	20	~~DNF~~	~~29~~	12	18	125	96
12	Theodor Sommerschield (NOR)	Jan-Erik Aarberg; Erik Wiik-Hansen	N	4	8	15	21	11	17	~~19~~	~~25~~	15	21	16	22	5	10	124	99
13	Kirkland Cooper (BER)	Eugene Simmons; Richard Belvin	KB	9	15	14	20	10	16	7	13	10	16	14	20	~~18~~	~~24~~	124	100
14	Robin Judah (GBR)	Charles Reynolds; David Tucker	K	5	10	17	23	6	11.7	~~20~~	~~26~~	16	22	15	21	8	14	127.7	101.7
15	Odysseus Eskitzoglou (GRE)	Georgios Zaimis; Anastasios Vogiatzis	GR	14	20	10	16	8	14	16	22	~~18~~	~~24~~	8	14	17	23	133	109
16	Godfrey Kelly (BAH)	George Ramsey; David Kelly	BA	~~DNF~~	~~28~~	DNF	28	17	23	14	20	9	15	9	15	10	16	145	117
17	António Menezes (POR)	Fernando Lima Bello; António Weck	P	17	23	13	19	15	21	11	17	~~DNF~~	~~29~~	12	18	20	26	153	124
18	Javier Velázquez (MEX)	Roberto Sloane; Esteban Gerard	MX	~~19~~	~~25~~	20	26	16	22	12	18	12	18	18	24	13	19	152	126
19	John Park (HKG)	William Turnbull; Paul Cooper	KH	20	26	12	18	20	26	15	21	13	19	~~22~~	~~28~~	19	25	163	135
20	Barton Kirkconnell (JAM)	Charles Ogilvie; Steven Henriques	KJ	11	17	16	22	~~22~~	~~28~~	21	27	22	28	17	23	15	21	166	138
21	Ángel Riveras (ESP)	Manuel Baiget; Eugenio Jáudenes	E	18	24	19	25	19	25	18	24	19	25	19	25	~~22~~	~~28~~	176	148
22	Daniel Trujillo (VEN)	Hervé Roche; Frohmund Burger	V	~~21~~	~~27~~	18	24	21	27	23	29	20	26	20	26	21	27	186	157
23	Chen Hsiu-hsiung (ROC)	Chang Jen-chih; Chen Chih-fu	TA	~~DNS~~	~~29~~	DNS	29	DNF	29	22	28	21	27	21	27	23	29	198	169

DNF = Did Not Finish, DNS= Did Not Start, DSQ = Disqualified
= Male, = Female

=== Daily standings ===
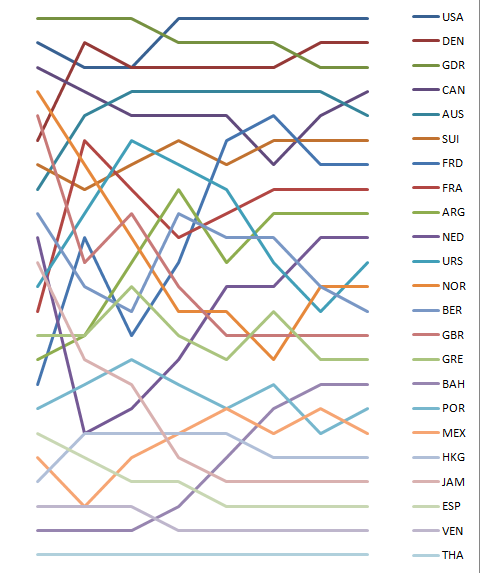
Graph showing the daily standings in the Dragon during the 1968 Summer Olympics

== Conditions at Acapulco ==
Of the total of three race areas were needed during the Olympics in Acapulco. Each of the classes was new Olympic scoring system.

Date	Race	Weather	Temperature (Celsius)	Wind direction (deg)	Wind speed (kn)	Sea	Current (kn-deg)
14 October 1968	I	Fair	29	300	16	Choppy	0.5-120
15 October 1968	II	Fair	29	293	20	Calm	0.2-160
16 October 1968	III	Fair	28.5	290	8-9	Calm	0.2-130
17 October 1968	IV	Fair	29.5	235	6	Calm	0.1-300
19 October 1968	V	Normal	29.8	187	6	Calm	1-326
20 October 1968	VI	Fair	30	225	5	Calm	0.7-275
21 October 1968	VII	Cloudy	28.5	285	12	Choppy	1-110
