= Sailing at the 1972 Summer Olympics =

Sailing at the Games of the XX Olympiad
- Venues: Olympiazentrum Schilksee
- Dates: First race: 29 August 1972; Last race: 8 September 1972
- Competitors: 323 from 42 nations
- Boats: 152

Sailing/Yachting is an Olympic sport starting from the Games of the 1st Olympiad (1896 Olympics in Athens, Greece). With the exception of 1904 and the canceled 1916 Summer Olympics, sailing has always been included on the Olympic schedule. The Sailing program of 1972 consisted of a total of six sailing classes (disciplines). For each class seven races were scheduled from 29 August 1972 to 8 September 1972 of the coast of Kiel-Schilksee in the Bay of Kiel. Kiel hosted the Olympic sailing competitions for the second time, having previously done so during the 1936 Summer Olympics. The sailing was done on the triangular type Olympic courses.

== Venue ==
Olympic Center Schilksee
- Olympiazentrum Schilksee
- Burgee of the Kieler Yacht Club

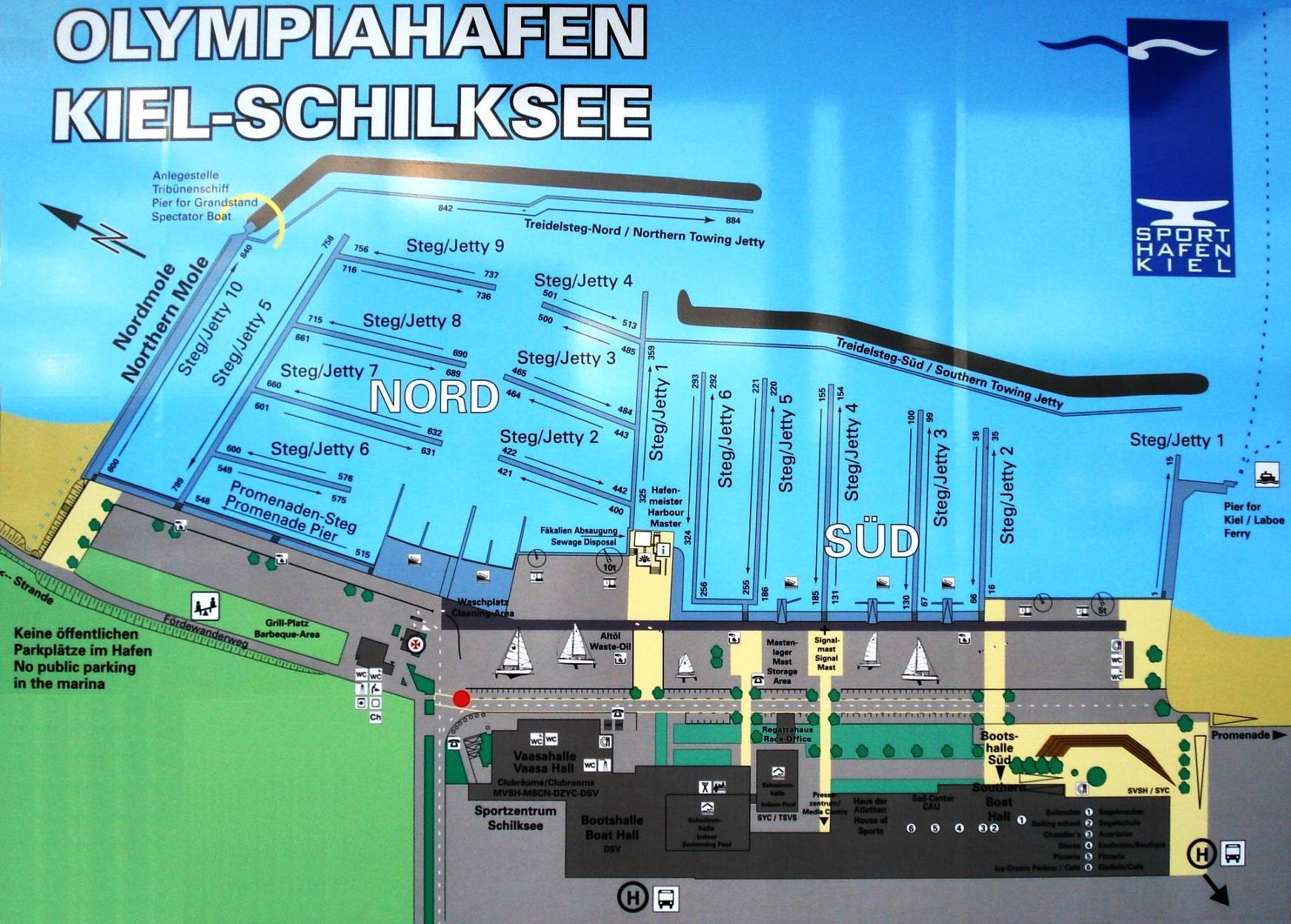
- Interactive map of the Olympic Center Schilksee area

General information
- Status: Completed
- Type: Olympic harbor
- Location: Germany
- Coordinates: 54°25′48″N 10°10′15″E
- Elevation: Sealevel
- Construction started: 13 October 1969
- Cost: € 30,000,000

Design and construction
- Architects: Heinrich Storch; Walter Ehlers

According to the IOC statutes the contests in all sport disciplines must be held either in, or as close as possible to the city which the IOC has chosen. Among others, an exception is made for the Olympic yachting events, which customarily must be staged on the open sea. On account of this principle, immediately after it became known that the city of Munich had the intention of hosting the Games of the XXth Olympiad, the cities of Kiel and Lübeck competed for the honor to carry out the Olympic yachting regattas.

=== Kiel-Schilksee (Olympiazentrum) ===
When Kiel (and the Kieler Yacht-Club) won the competition the following was decided:

- a yachting center would be built in Kiel/Schilksee that, as was the case with the sport facilities in Munich, must be usable after the period of the Olympic Games as a future sports center;
- the city of Kiel will conduct a building competition for the Olympic Center in Kiel-Schilksee as soon as possible;
- the OC will form a committee for the Olympic yachting events to coordinate all contingencies arising in Kiel, and will in addition create a corresponding full-time organization of the OC in Kiel in order to handle the necessary work and activities in Kiel on schedule.

During the Games the number of spectators and visitors at the Olympic events in Kiel and at the Olympic Center in Kiel-Schilksee exceeded the expectations by a large margin. Conservative estimates put the total number at about a million spectators and visitors in Kiel.

=== Course areas ===
A total of three race areas were set in the Firth of Kiel of the coast of Kiel/Schilksee. The location points to the center of the 2 nm radius circle for course area A & B and to a 1.5 nm radius circle for course area C.

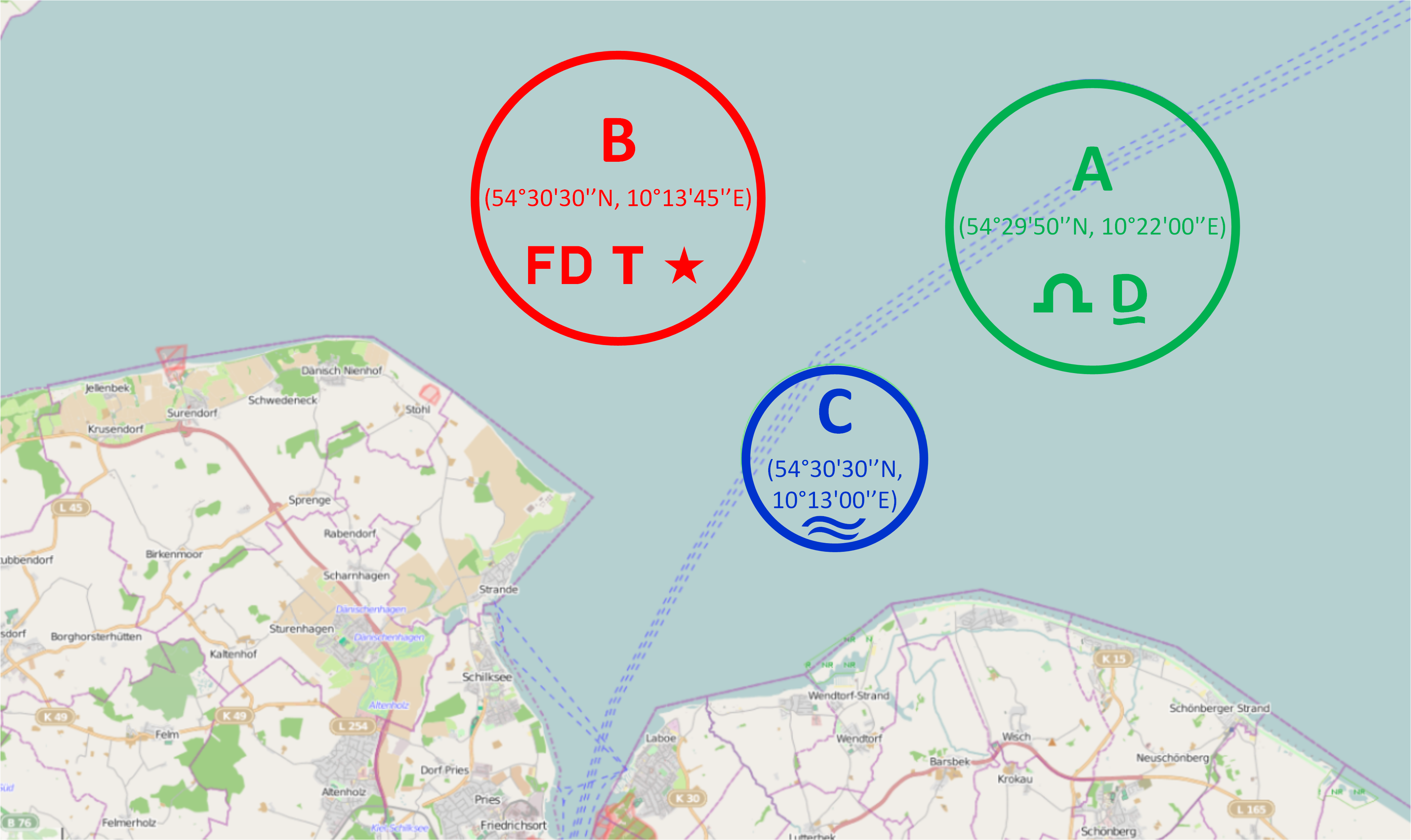
Olympic Course Areas 1972. A: 54°29'50'’N, 10°22'00'’E (Soling & Dragon) B: 54°30'30'’N, 10°13'45'’E(Flying Dutchman, Tempest & Star) C: 54°30'30'’N, 10°13'00'’E (Finn)

== Competition ==
=== Overview ===
Continents	Countries	Classes	Boats	Male	Female
4	42	6	152	323	0

=== Continents ===
- Asia
- Oceania
- Europe
- Americas

=== Countries ===
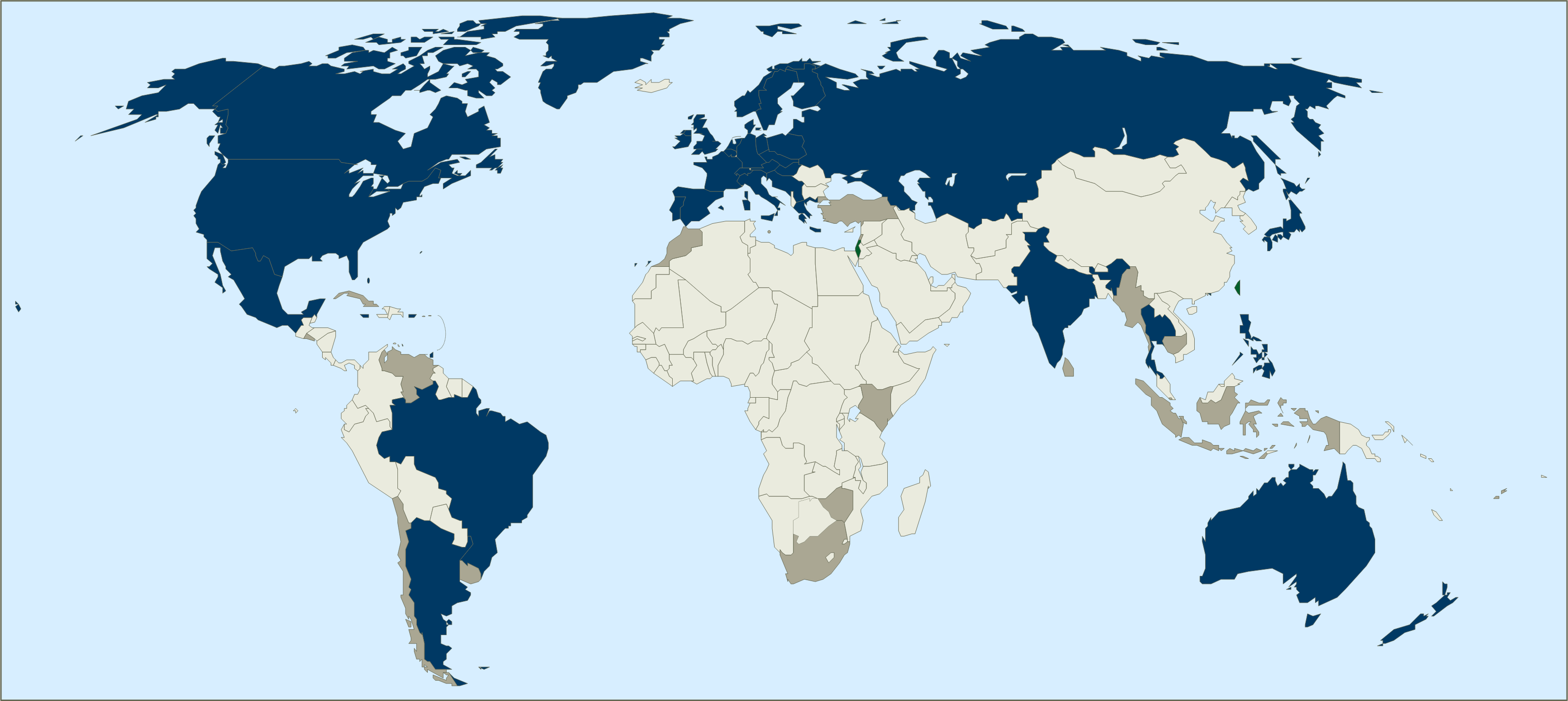
Countries that participated in the Sailing event of the 1972 Olympic Games. Blue: Water Gray: Never participated in OG Dark Gray: Participated in earlier OG Green: Country participated for the first time Dark Blue: Country participated also on previous games Red: Country boycotted the sailing event of the OG

Argentina	Australia	Austria	Bahamas
Belgium	Bermuda	Brazil	Canada
Denmark	Spain	Finland	France
West Germany	Great Britain	East Germany	Greece
Hong Kong	Hungary	India	Ireland
Israel	Virgin Islands	Italy	Jamaica
Japan	Mexico	Netherlands	Norway
New Zealand	Philippines	Poland	Portugal
Puerto Rico	Republic of China	Switzerland	Sweden
Czechoslovakia	Thailand	Trinidad and Tobago	Soviet Union
United States	Yugoslavia

=== Classes (equipment) ===
Class	Type	Event	Sailors	Trapeze	Mainsail	Jib/Genoa	Spinnaker	First OG	Olympics so far
Finn	Dinghy		1	0	+	–	–	1952	6
Flying Dutchman	Dinghy		2	1	+	+	+	1960	4
Tempest	Keelboat		2	1	+	+	+	1972	1
Star	Keelboat		2	0	+	+	–	1932	9
Soling	Keelboat		3	0	+	+	+	1972	1
Dragon	Keelboat		3	0	+	+	+	1948	7

1972 Olympic Classes designs

== Race schedule ==
●	Opening ceremony	●	Event competitions	●	Event finals	●	Closing ceremony

Date	August						September										
Date	26th Sat	27th Sun	28th Mon	29th Tue	30th Wed	31st Thu	1st Fri	2nd Sat	3rd Sun	4th Mon	5th Tue	6th Wed	7th Thu	8th Fri	9th Sat	10th Sun	11th Mon
Sailing (planning)				● ● ● ● ● ●	● ● ● ● ● ●	● ● ● ● ● ●	● ● ● ● ● ●	Spare day	Spare day	● ● ● ● ● ●	● ● ● ● ● ●	● ● ● ● ● ●	Spare day	Spare day			
Total gold medals												6					
Sailing (actual)				● ● ● ● ● ●	● ● ● ● ● ●	● ● ● ● ● ●	● ● ● ● ● ●	Spare day	Spare day	● ● ● ● ● ●	● ● ● ●		Fog	● ● ● ● ● ●			
Total gold medals														6			
Ceremonies	●															●	

== Medal summary ==
Event	Gold	Silver	Bronze
1972: Finn	France (FRA); Serge Maury	Greece (GRE); Ilias Hatzipavlis	Soviet Union (URS); Viktor Potapov
1972: Flying Dutchman	Great Britain (GBR); Rodney Pattisson; Christopher Davies	France (FRA); Yves Pajot; Marc Pajot	West Germany (FRG); Ulli Libor; Peter Naumann
1972: Tempest	Soviet Union (URS); Valentin Mankin; Vitali Dyrdyra	Great Britain (GBR); Alan Warren; David Hunt	United States (USA); Glen Foster; Peter Dean
1972: Star	Australia (AUS); David Forbes; John Anderson	Sweden (SWE); Pelle Petterson; Stellan Westerdahl	West Germany (FRG); Wilhelm Kuhweide; Karsten Meyer
1972: Soling	United States (USA); Harry Melges; William Allen; William Bentsen	Sweden (SWE); Stig Wennerström; Bo Knape; Stefan Krook	Canada (CAN); David Miller; Paul Côté; John Ekels
1972: Dragon	Australia (AUS); John Cuneo; Thomas Anderson; John Shaw	East Germany (GDR); Paul Borowski; Karl-Heinz Thun; Konrad Weichert	United States (USA); Donald Cohan; Charles Horter; John Marshall

== Medal table ==
Rank	Nation	Gold	Silver	Bronze	Total
1	Australia	2	0	0	2
2	France	1	1	0	2
2	Great Britain	1	1	0	2
4	United States	1	0	2	3
5	Soviet Union	1	0	1	2
6	Sweden	0	2	0	2
7	East Germany	0	1	0	1
7	Greece	0	1	0	1
9	West Germany	0	0	2	2
10	Canada	0	0	1	1
Totals (10 entries)		6	6	6	18

== Notes ==
=== Munich ===
Because of the distance to Munich and the fact that no sailing was scheduled for 6 and 7 September, the killings of 11 Israeli athletes had less impact on sailing than it had on the other events in Munich. Only a few of the sailing teams did not start at the last day of the races, among them the Israelian Flying Dutchman team of Yair Michaeli and Izchak Nir.

== Other information ==
=== Sailing ===
- This Olympic sailing event was gender independent, but turned out to be a Men-only event. This was one of the triggers to create gender specific events. This however had to wait until 1988.
- Some sources state the Finn event as a designated men-only event. The Official report of the games does not mention this gender specific discriminator,
- It was the first Olympic sailing contest where only "One Design" classes were used. Also none of the classes was "owned by one builder". In general more than one builder was allowed. (The boats had to apply to what we now call open standards).
- Paul Elvstrøm was trying to win his fifth gold medal. However, he left the games prematurely. Assumed is that the media pressure became too high at that moment. Paul took revenge by sailing two times more at the Olympics (1984 and 1988) in the Tornado. One of Paul's crewmembers from the Soling took the gold later. Valdemar Bandolowski together with 1972 Dragon helmsman Poul Richard Høj Jensen won the Gold in the Soling class in 1976 and 1980.
- Although favourable wind conditions in September were predicted. Some of the races suffered from lack of wind. In the Soling and Dragon only 6 races could be completed and the 6th race in the Finn only three contenders were able to finish in time.

=== Sailors ===
During the sailing regattas at the 1972 Summer Olympics among others the following persons were competing in the various classes:

- Royalties
  - Thailand, Prince of Thailand, Prinz Bhanubanda Bira in the Tempest
  - Norway, King of Norway, Crownprince Harald in the Soling
  - Spain, King of Spain, Sar Juan Carlos de Borbon in the Dragon
- Sportmanagers
  - Belgium, Past President International Olympic Committee, Jacques Rogge in the Finn
  - Finland, Past president International Sailing Federation, Peter Tallberg in the Soling
- First non American winner of the America's Cup
  - Australia, John Bertrand in the Finn
Sailors at the 1972 Olympic Games
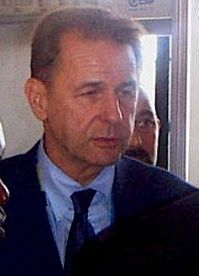
In Finn:
Jacques Rogge

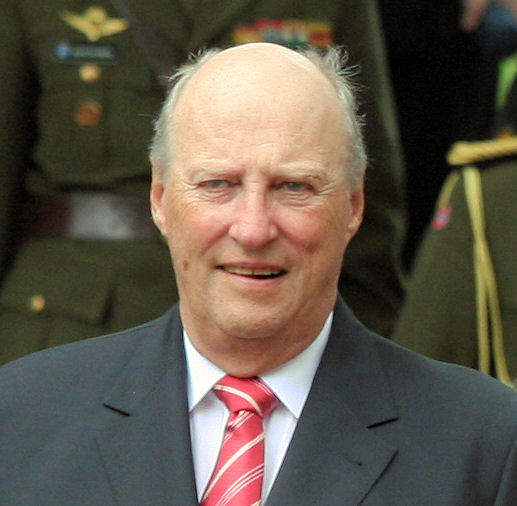
In Soling:
Harald V of Norway

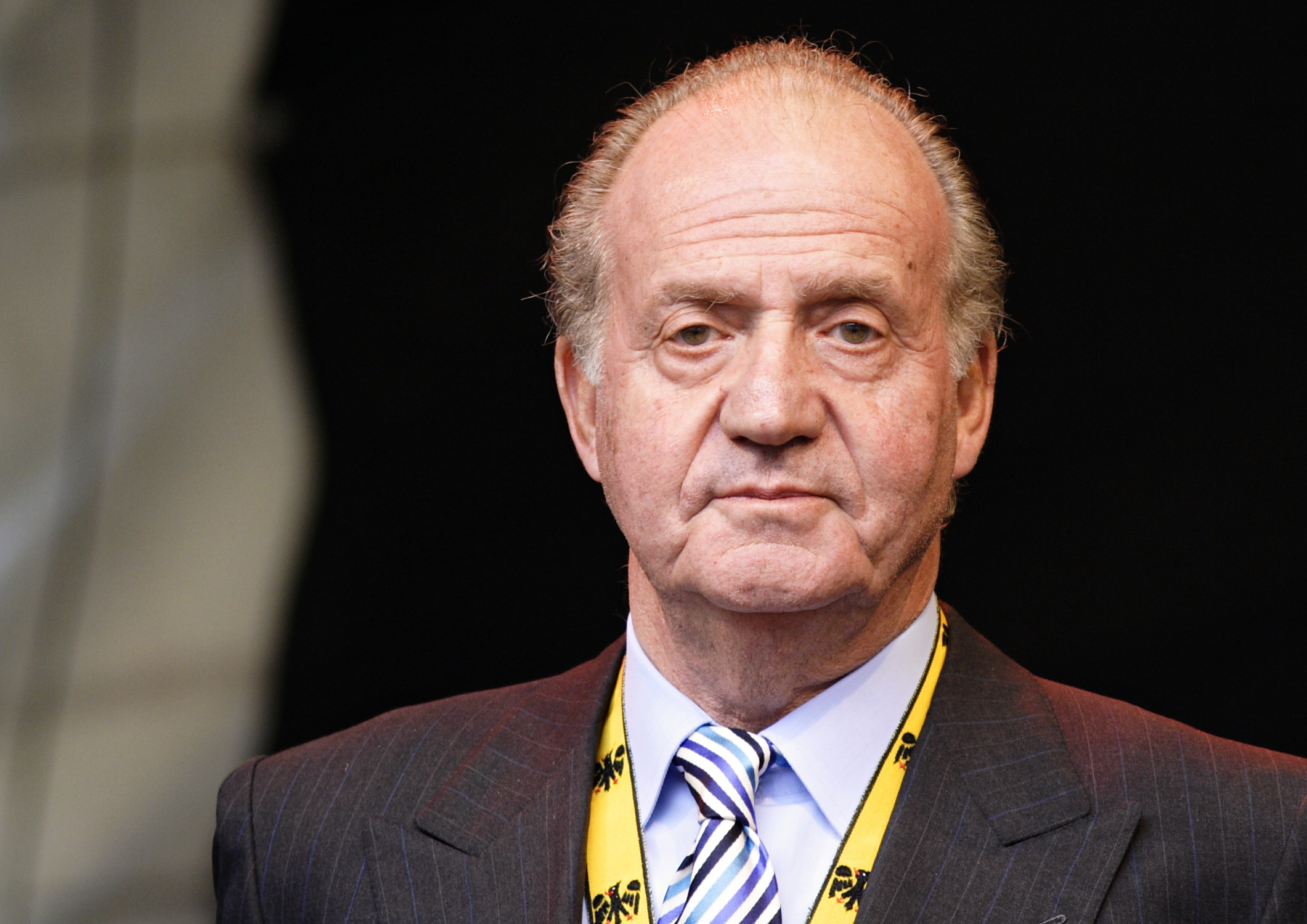
In Dragon:
Juan Carlos I of Spain

== Sources ==
- The official report of the Organizing Committee for the Games of the XXth Olympiad Munich 1972, Volume 3 The competitions (PDF). Archived from the original (PDF) on 27 September 2007.
- Evans, Hilary; Gjerde, Arild; Heijmans, Jeroen; Mallon, Bill; et al. "Sailing at the 1972 München Summer Games". Olympics at Sports-Reference.com. Sports Reference LLC. Archived from the original on 17 April 2020.
- "Munich 1972". Olympics.com. International Olympic Committee.
