= Sailing at the 1971 Mediterranean Games =

- Venue: İzmir
- Dates: 6– 17 October 1971

Sailing competitions at the 1971 Mediterranean Games were held from 6 to 17 October 1971 in İzmir.

== Medal table ==
Rank	Nation	Gold	Silver	Bronze	Total
1	Italy	1	2	0	3
2	Greece	1	1	2	4
3	Yugoslavia	1	0	0	1
4	Turkey	0	0	1	1
Totals (4 entries)		3	3	3	9

== Medal summary ==
Event	Gold		Silver		Bronze	
Dragon	Greece; Ioannis Giapalakis; Panagiotis Mikhail; Ioannis Kiousis	0 point	Greece; Anastasios Vatistas; Michel Panagopoulos; Ioannis Cristakopoulos	15 points	Turkey; Bilhan Merzeci; Halim Emre; Metin Akdurak	30,4 points
Finn	Fabris Minski; Yugoslavia	14,7 points	Mauro Pelaschier; Italy	26,7 points	Ilias Hatzipavlis; Greece	28,4 points
Flying Dutchman	Italy; Carlo Massone; Fabio Risso	8 points	Italy; Carlo Croce; Roberto Bianchi	20,4 points	Greece; Khristos Bonas; Antonios Bonas	22 points
