= Michael Nunes =

Michael Nunes may refer to:

- Michael Nunes (actor), American actor
- Michael Keith Nunes (1918–1996), Jamaican sailor
- Michael Anthony Nunes (born 1947), Jamaican sailor
