= Khabarov =

Khabarov (masculine, Russian: Хабаров, IPA: [xɐˈbarəf]) or Khabarova (feminine, Russian: Хабарова), also transliterated as Habarov, is a Russian surname. Notable people with the surname include:

- Boris Khabarov (born 1934), Soviet sailor
- Bruno Khabarov (1939–1994), Latvian-Soviet fencer
- Irina Khabarova (born 1966), Russian sprinter
- Ivan Khabarov (1888–1960), Soviet army commander
- Leonid Khabarov (born 1947), Soviet military officer
- Mikhail Khabarov (born 1971), Russian businessman
- Sergei Khabarov (born 1986), Russian footballer
- Vladimir Khabarov (1951–2010), was a Russian politician
- Yaroslav Khabarov (born 1989), Russian ice hockey player
- Yerofey Khabarov (c. 1603–1671), Russian entrepreneur and adventurer
