= Cor Groot =

Dutch sailor

Personal information
- Full name: Cornelis Groot
- Nationality: Dutch
- Born: 21 January 1909 Akersloot
- Died: 23 September 1978 (aged 69) Haarlem
- Height: 1.79 m (5.9 ft)

Sport

Sailing career
- Class: Dragon
- Updated on 2014-01-09

Cornelis "Cor" Groot (21 January 1909, Akersloot – 23 September 1978, Haarlem) was a sailor from the Netherlands, who represented his country at the 1968 Summer Olympics in Acapulco. Groot, as helmsman on the Dutch Dragon, took 10th place with crew members Jan Bol and Pieter de Zwart. Groot was also the substitute helmsmen for the 1964 Dutch Dragon.

== Sources ==
- Evans, Hilary; Gjerde, Arild; Heijmans, Jeroen; Mallon, Bill; et al. "Cor Groot". Olympics at Sports-Reference.com. Sports Reference LLC. Archived from the original on 2020-04-18.
- "Zeilploeg voor Tokio bekend" (in Dutch). Het vrĳe volk : democratisch-socialistisch dagblad. 1964-05-09.
- "Kunde" (in Dutch) (Day ed.). De Telegraaf. 1964-09-21.
- "The Games of the XVIII Olympiad Tokio 1964, The Official Report of the Organizing Committee Volume One Part One" (PDF). 1964. Archived from the original (pdf) on 2010-05-06.
- "The Games of the XVIII Olympiad Tokio 1964, The Official Report of the Organizing Committee Volume One Part Two" (PDF). 1964. Archived from the original (pdf) on 2008-11-18.
- "The Games of the XVIII Olympiad Tokio 1964, The Official Report of the Organizing Committee Volume Two Part One" (PDF). 1964. Archived from the original (pdf) on 2008-02-26.
- "The Games of the XVIII Olympiad Tokio 1964, The Official Report of the Organizing Committee Volume Two Part Two" (PDF). 1964. Archived from the original (pdf) on 2009-01-26.
- "De Nederlandse afvaardiging" (in Dutch). Limburgsch dagblad. 1968-10-11.
- "Zeilers hebben geen tijd om uit te huilen" (in Dutch). De tĳd : dagblad voor Nederland. 1968-11-09.
- "The Games of the XIX Olympiad Mexico 1968, The Official Report of the Organizing Committee Volume One Part One" (PDF). 1968. Archived from the original (pdf) on 2008-11-18.
- "The Games of the XIX Olympiad Mexico 1968, The Official Report of the Organizing Committee Volume One Part Two" (PDF). 1968. Archived from the original (pdf) on 2008-11-18.
- "The Games of the XIX Olympiad Mexico 1968, The Official Report of the Organizing Committee Volume Two Part One" (PDF). 1968. Archived from the original (pdf) on 2008-11-18.
- "The Games of the XIX Olympiad Mexico 1968, The Official Report of the Organizing Committee Volume Two Part Two" (PDF). 1968. Archived from the original (pdf) on 2008-11-18.
- "The Games of the XIX Olympiad Mexico 1968, The Official Report of the Organizing Committee Volume Three Part One" (PDF). 1968. Archived from the original (pdf) on 2008-02-26.
- "The Games of the XIX Olympiad Mexico 1968, The Official Report of the Organizing Committee Volume Three Part Two" (PDF). 1968. Archived from the original (pdf) on 2008-11-18.
- "The Games of the XIX Olympiad Mexico 1968, The Official Report of the Organizing Committee Volume Four Part One" (PDF). 1968. Archived from the original (pdf) on 2008-11-18.
- "The Games of the XIX Olympiad Mexico 1968, The Official Report of the Organizing Committee Volume Four Part Two" (PDF). 1968. Archived from the original (pdf) on 2008-11-18.
