= Heilmeier =

Heilmeier is a German surname. Notable people with the surname include:

- Franz Heilmeier (born 1930), German sailor
- George H. Heilmeier (1936–2014), American engineer and businessman

== See also ==
- Meier, a German surname
