= Thor Thorvaldsen =

Norwegian sailor (1909–1987)

Personal information
- Nationality: Norwegian
- Born: 31 May 1909 Bamble Municipality, Norway
- Died: 30 June 1987 (aged 78)

Sailing career
- Sport: Sailing

Achievements and titles
- Olympic finals: 2
Medal record
Men's sailing
Representing Norway
Olympic Games
Gold medal – first place	1948 London	Dragon
Gold medal – first place	1952 Helsinki	Dragon

Thor Thorvaldsen (31 May 1909 – 30 June 1987) was a Norwegian sailor and Olympic champion. He was born in Bamble Municipality and died in Bærum Municipality. He competed at the 1948 Summer Olympics in London, where he received a gold medal in the dragon class as helmsman on the boat Pan.

He competed at the 1952 Summer Olympics in Helsinki, where he again received a gold medal with Pan.

== See also ==
- List of Olympic medalists in Dragon class sailing
