= Sven Hansson (disambiguation) =

Sven Hansson (1912–1971) was a Swedish country skier.

Sven Hansson may also refer to:

- Sven Ove Hansson (born 1951), Swedish philosopher
- Sven Lysholt Hansen (born 1945), Danish rower

== See also ==
- Sven Hanson (disambiguation)
- Sven Hansen (1876–1958), Welsh shipowner and shipbuilder
- Hansson (surname)
