= Barton Jahncke =

American sailor (1939–2024)

Personal information
- Full name: Barton Williams Benedict Jahncke
- Born: August 5, 1939 New Orleans, Louisiana, U.S.
- Died: January 7, 2024 (aged 84)
Medal record
Men's sailing
Representing the United States
Olympic Games
Gold medal – first place	1968 Mexico City	Dragon

Barton Williams Benedict Jahncke (August 5, 1939 – January 7, 2024) was an American sailor and Olympic champion.

== Biography ==
Barton Williams Benedict Jahncke was born on August 5, 1939.

Jahncke competed at the 1968 Summer Olympics in Mexico City, where he received a gold medal in the dragon class as crew member (with George Friedrichs and Gerald Schreck) on the boat Williwaw.

Jahncke died on January 7, 2024, at the age of 84.

== See also ==
- List of Olympic medalists in Dragon class sailing
