= George Friedrichs =

American sailor

Medal record

Men's sailing

Representing the United States

Olympic Games
| Gold medal – first place | 1968 Mexico City | Dragon |

George Shelby Friedrichs Jr. (February 15, 1940, in New Orleans – March 20, 1991), known as "Buddy", was an American sailor and Olympic champion. He was Dragon Class World Champion in 1967 before competing at the 1968 Summer Olympics in Mexico City (sailing events in Acapulco, where he received a gold medal in the Dragon class as helmsman on the red-painted boat WILLIWAW. Serving as crew members on WILLIWAW were Gerald "Click" Schreck and Barton Jahncke.

== See also ==
- List of Olympic medalists in Dragon class sailing
