= Charles Horter =

American sailor

Personal information
- Full name: Charles John Horter
- Born: April 27, 1947 (age 79) Philadelphia, Pennsylvania, U.S.
Medal record
Sailing
Representing the United States
Olympic Games
Bronze medal – third place	1972 Munich	Dragon class

Charles John Horter (born April 27, 1947 in Philadelphia, Pennsylvania) is an American competitive sailor and Olympic medalist, who competed in the 1968, 1972, 1976 and 1980 Olympic Trials. He won a bronze medal in the Dragon class at the 1972 Summer Olympics in Munich, together with Donald Cohan and John Marshall. A former captain of the Drexel University sailing team, Horter is also a past commodore of both the Corinthian Yacht Club of Philadelphia and the Island Heights Yacht Club. While competing in various Olympic Trials, Horter served in the First Troop Philadelphia City Cavalry, America's first and oldest volunteer cavalry unit. Horter has been inducted into both the Drexel University Athletic Hall of Fame and the Barnegat Bay Sailing Hall of Fame. Horter has three sons and currently resides in Philadelphia with his wife, Tricia.
