= Pieter de Zwart =

Dutch sailor (born 1944)

Personal information
- Full name: Pieter Leonard de Zwart
- Nationality: Dutch
- Born: 16 March 1944 (age 82) Rio de Janeiro
- Height: 1.80 m; 5 ft 11 in

Sailing career
- Sport: Sailing
- Class: Dragon
- Updated on 2014-01-09

Pieter de Zwart (born 16 March 1944) is a sailor from the Netherlands, who represented his country at the 1968 Summer Olympics in Acapulco. De Zwart, as crew on the Dutch Dragon, took 10th place with helmsman Cor Groot and fellow crew member Jan Bol.

== Sources ==
- "Pieter de Zwart Bio, Stats, and Results". Olympic Sports. Sports-Reference.com. Archived from the original on 2020-04-17.
- "De Nederlandse afvaardiging" (in Dutch). Limburgsch dagblad. 1968-10-11.
- "Zeilers hebben geen tijd om uit te huilen" (in Dutch). De tĳd : dagblad voor Nederland. 1968-11-09.
- "The Games of the XIX Olympiad Mexico 1968, The Official Report of the Organizing Committee Volume One Part One" (PDF). 1968. Archived from the original (PDF) on 2008-11-18.
- "The Games of the XIX Olympiad Mexico 1968, The Official Report of the Organizing Committee Volume One Part Two" (PDF). 1968. Archived from the original (PDF) on 2008-11-18.
- "The Games of the XIX Olympiad Mexico 1968, The Official Report of the Organizing Committee Volume Two Part One" (PDF). 1968. Archived from the original (PDF) on 2008-11-18.
- "The Games of the XIX Olympiad Mexico 1968, The Official Report of the Organizing Committee Volume Two Part Two" (PDF). 1968. Archived from the original (PDF) on 2008-11-18.
- "The Games of the XIX Olympiad Mexico 1968, The Official Report of the Organizing Committee Volume Three Part One" (PDF). 1968. Archived from the original (PDF) on 2008-02-26.
- "The Games of the XIX Olympiad Mexico 1968, The Official Report of the Organizing Committee Volume Three Part Two" (PDF). 1968. Archived from the original (PDF) on 2008-11-18.
- "The Games of the XIX Olympiad Mexico 1968, The Official Report of the Organizing Committee Volume Four Part One" (PDF). 1968. Archived from the original (PDF) on 2008-11-18.
- "The Games of the XIX Olympiad Mexico 1968, The Official Report of the Organizing Committee Volume Four Part Two" (PDF). 1968. Archived from the original (PDF) on 2008-11-18.
