= John Marshall (sailor) =

American sailor

Personal information
- Full name: John Knox Marshall
- Born: April 9, 1942 (age 84) Santiago, Chile

Sailing career
- Sport: Sailing
Medal record
Sailing
Representing the United States
Olympic Games
Bronze medal – third place	1972 Munich	Dragon class

John Knox Marshall (born April 9, 1942 in Santiago, Chile) is an American competitive sailor and Olympic medalist. He won a bronze medal in the Dragon class at the 1972 Summer Olympics in Munich, together with Donald Cohan and Charles Horter.

== America's Cup ==
In 1974 he sailed as a crew member on Intrepid during the trials, although she was not chosen to defend. In 1977, Marshall crewed for Lowell North on Enterprise although again the boat failed to be picked as the defender In 1980, Marshall was a part of the successful crew aboard Freedom. As president of North’s company North Sails, Marshall was in charge of the sail inventory and the trimming of the mainsail that year.

Marshall was involved in the 1983 America's Cup as a mainsheet trimmer on board Liberty. He then helped design Stars & Stripes 87 for the 1987 America's Cup and the Stars & Stripes catamaran for the 1988 America's Cup.

For the 1995 America's Cup, Marshall led the PACT 95 syndicate whose yacht, Young America, narrowly lost the 1995 Citizen Cup to Stars & Stripes. For the 2000 Louis Vuitton Cup, the Young America syndicate represented the New York Yacht Club.

He was inducted into the America's Cup Hall of Fame in 2017.

He graduated from Harvard University in 1963.
