= Gerald Schreck =

American sailor (1939–2022)

Personal information
- Born: March 8, 1939 Pensacola, Florida, U.S.
- Died: April 2, 2022 (aged 83) Pensacola, Florida, U.S.
- Height: 175 cm (5 ft 9 in)
- Weight: 77 kg (170 lb)

Sailing career
- Sport: Sailing
- Club: Southern Yacht Club, New Orleans
- Class: Dragon
Medal record
Men's sailing
Representing United States
Olympic Games
Gold medal – first place	1968 Mexico City	Dragon

Gerald Click "Click" Schreck (March 8, 1939 – April 2, 2022) was an American sailor and Olympic champion. He competed at the 1968 Summer Olympics in Mexico City, where he received a gold medal in the Dragon class as crew member (with George Friedrichs and Barton Jahncke) on the boat Williwaw.

Born in Pensacola, Florida, Schreck worked as a sailmaker. He died on April 2, 2022, in Pensacola at the age of 83.

== See also ==
- List of Olympic medalists in Dragon class sailing
