= Jan Bol =

Dutch sailor (1924–2010)

Personal information
- Full name: Jan Bol
- Nationality: Dutch
- Born: March 4, 1924 Aalsmeer, North Holland, Netherlands
- Died: February 11, 2010 (aged 85) Noordbergum, Friesland, Netherlands
- Height: 1.80 m (5.9 ft)

Sport

Sailing career
- Class: Dragon
- Updated on 2015-01-21

Jan Bol (March 4, 1924-February 11, 2010) was a Dutch sailor who represented his country at the 1968 Summer Olympics in Acapulco. Bol, as crew on the Dutch Dragon, took the 10th place with helmsman Cor Groot and fellow crew member Pieter de Zwart.
