= Paul Lindemark Jørgensen =

Danish sailor

Medal record

Sailing

Representing Denmark

Olympic Games
Silver medal – second place	1968 Mexico City	Dragon class

Paul Lindemark Jørgensen (29 July 1916 – 2 December 1988) was a Danish competitive sailor and Olympic medalist.

He was born in Copenhagen. He won a silver medal in the Dragon class at the 1968 Summer Olympics in Mexico City, together with Aage Birch and Niels Markussen.
