= Nikolai Gromov =

Nikolai Gromov may refer to:

- Nikolai Gromov (footballer)
- Nikolay Gromov (sailor)
