= John Shaw (sailor) =

Australian sailor (1937–1995)

Personal information
- Full name: John Cameron Shaw
- Born: 23 May 1937
- Died: 23 December 1995 (aged 58)
- Height: 182 cm (6 ft 0 in)
- Weight: 71 kg (157 lb)

Sailing career
- Sport: Sailing
- Class: Dragon
Medal record
Men's sailing
Representing Australia
Olympic Games
Gold medal – first place	1972 Munich	Dragon

John Cameron Shaw (born 23 May 1937 – 23 December 1995) was an Australian sailor and Olympic champion. He competed at the 1972 Summer Olympics in Munich, where he received a gold medal in the dragon class, together with crew members John Cuneo and Thomas Anderson.

In 2018, Shaw was inducted to the Australian Sailing Hall of Fame alongside Cuneo and Anderson.

== See also ==
- List of Olympic medalists in Dragon class sailing
