= Vladimir Yakovlev =

Vladimir Yakovlev may refer to:

- Vladimir Yakovlev (general), Russian general
- Vladimir Yakovlev (journalist), Russian journalist
- Vladimir Yakovlev (sailor) (1930–2009), Soviet Olympic sailor
- Vladimir Yakovlev (politician) (born 1944), Russian politician
