= Roberto Sloane =

Mexican sailor (1925–2001

Personal information
- Full name: Robert Francis Sloane Nivet
- Nationality: Mexican
- Born: 26 January 1925 Neuilly-sur-Seine, France
- Died: 3 May 2001 (aged 76) Acapulco, Mexico

Sport
- Sport: Sailing

Robert Francis Sloane Nivet (26 January 1925 – 3 May 2001) was a Mexican sailor. He competed in the Dragon event at the 1968 Summer Olympics. Sloane died in Acapulco on 3 May 2001, at the age of 76.
