= Eugenio Jáudenes =

Spanish sailor

Personal information
- Nationality: Spanish
- Born: 18 January 1920 Ferrol, Spain
- Died: 31 January 2004 (aged 84) Palma de Mallorca, Spain

Sport
- Sport: Sailing

Eugenio Jáudenes (18 January 1920 – 31 January 2004) was a Spanish sailor. He competed in the Dragon event at the 1968 Summer Olympics.
