= Ángel Riveras =

Spanish sailor

Personal information
- Full name: Ángel Riveras de la Portilla
- Nationality: Spanish
- Born: 2 October 1908; Zaragoza, Spain
- Died: 2 October 1993 (aged 85); Bayonne, France

Sport
- Sport: Sailing

Ángel Riveras (2 October 1908 – 2 October 1993) was a Spanish sailor. He competed in the Dragon event at the 1968 Summer Olympics.
