= Treen Morris =

Irish sailor

Personal information
- Nationality: Irish
- Born: 3 January 1944 (age 81)

Sport
- Sport: Sailing

Treen Morris (born 3 January 1944) is an Irish sailor. He competed in the Dragon event at the 1972 Summer Olympics.
