= Valery Ruzhnikov =

Soviet sailor

Personal information
- Nationality: Soviet
- Born: 24 December 1939 (age 85); Mezen, Russia

Sport
- Sport: Sailing

Valery Ruzhnikov (born 24 December 1939) is a Soviet sailor. He competed in the Dragon event at the 1968 Summer Olympics.
