= Yury Anisimov =

Soviet sailor

Personal information
- Nationality: Soviet
- Born: 21 March 1938; Arkhangelsk, Russia
- Died: 15 December 2012 (aged 74); Arkhangelsk, Russia

Sport
- Sport: Sailing

Yury Anisimov (21 March 1938 – 15 December 2012) was a Soviet sailor. He competed in the Dragon event at the 1968 Summer Olympics.
