= David Kelly (Bahamian sailor) =

Bahamian sailor

David Albert Kelly CBE (March 25, 1932 in Nassau, Bahamas – March 11, 2009 in New York City, New York) was a Bahamian Olympic sailor in the Dragon class. He competed in the 1968 Olympics together with Godfrey Kelly and Roy Ramsay, and finished 16th, and in the 1972 Olympics together with Christopher McKinney and Godfrey Kelly, finishing 19th. Kelly also competed in the Star class, finishing 5th together with Basil Kelly in the 1955 Star World Championships.
