= Niels Markussen =

Danish sailor

Personal information
- Full name: Niels Peter Markussen
- Nationality: Danish
- Born: 6 September 1934 Helsingør, Denmark
- Died: 11 July 2008 (aged 73)
- Height: 177 cm (5 ft 10 in)
- Weight: 68 kg (150 lb)

Sailing career
- Sport: Sailing
- Club: Royal Danish Yacht Club
- Class: Dragon
Medal record
Men's sailing
Representing Denmark
Olympic Games
| Silver medal – second place | 1968 Mexico City | Dragon |

Niels Peter Markussen (6 September 1934 – 11 July 2008) was a Danish competitive sailor and Olympic medalist. He won a silver medal in the Dragon class at the 1968 Summer Olympics in Mexico City, together with Paul Lindemark Jørgensen and Aage Birch.
