= Minski Fabris =

Croatian sailor

Personal information
- Nationality: Croatian
- Born: 2 August 1941 (age 84) Split, Yugoslavia

Sport
- Sport: Sailing
- Club: JK Labud Split
Medal record
Representing Yugoslavia
European Championships
Silver medal – second place	1977 Istanbul	Finn class
Gold medal – first place	1978 Marstrand	Finn class
Mediterranean Games
Gold medal – first place	1971 İzmir	Finn class
Bronze medal – third place	1979 Split	Finn class

Minski Fabris (born 2 August 1941) is a Croatian former sailor. He competed at the 1972 Summer Olympics, the 1976 Summer Olympics and the 1980 Summer Olympics.
