= Franz Heilmeier =

German sailor

Franz Heilmeier (born 20 October 1930) was a German sailor who was a helmsman of the West German Dragon team, which took the 4th place in Dragon event at the 1972 Summer Olympics. He was born in Dießen am Ammersee.
