= Anastasios Vogiatzis =

Greek sailor

Personal information
- Nationality: Greek
- Born: 3 April 1936 (age 88); Piraeus, Greece

Sport
- Sport: Sailing

Anastasios Vogiatzis (born 3 April 1936) is a Greek sailor. He competed in the Dragon event at the 1968 Summer Olympics.
