= John Ferguson (sailor) =

Australian sailor

Personal information
- Full name: John Abbott Ferguson
- Born: 4 June 1944 (age 82)
- Height: 189 cm (6 ft 2 in)

Sport
- Country: Australia
- Sport: Sailing

John Abbott Ferguson (born 4 June 1944) is an Australian competitive sailor. He competed at the 1968 Summer Olympics in Mexico City, in the dragon class.
