= Aage Birch =

Danish sailor (1926–2017)

Medal record

Sailing

Representing Denmark

Olympic Games
Silver medal – second place	1968 Mexico City	Dragon class

Aage Birch (23 September 1926 in Søllerød, Denmark – 13 February 2017) was a Danish competitive sailor and Olympic medalist. He won a silver medal in the Dragon class at the 1968 Summer Olympics in Mexico City, together with Poul Lindemark-Jørgensen and Niels Markussen.
