= Roger Eliasson =

Swedish sailor

Roger Eliasson is a Swedish sailor in the Dragon class. He became World Champion in 1973 together with Jerry Burman and Johan Palmqvist.
