= Tadeusz Piotrowski (sailor) =

Polish sailor

Personal information
- Nationality: Polish
- Born: 11 July 1940 (age 84); Warsaw, Poland

Sport
- Sport: Sailing

Tadeusz Piotrowski (born 11 July 1940) is a Polish sailor. He competed in the Dragon event at the 1972 Summer Olympics.
