= Erik Wiik-Hansen =

Norwegian sailor

Personal information
- Born: 3 July 1934 Bærum, Norway
- Died: 5 March 2008 (aged 73) Bærum

Sailing career
- Country: Norway
- Sport: Sailing

Erik Wiik-Hansen (3 July 1934 – 5 March 2008) was a Norwegian competitive sailor. He was born in Bærum. He competed at the 1968 Summer Olympics in Mexico City, in the dragon class.
