= Gunnar Broberg (sailor) =

Swedish sailor

Personal information
- Nationality: Swedish
- Born: 5 October 1944; Gothenburg, Sweden
- Died: 6 September 2023 (aged 78)

Sport
- Sport: Sailing

Gunnar Broberg (5 October 1944 – 6 September 2023) was a Swedish sailor. He competed in the Dragon event at the 1968 Summer Olympics.
