= Lennart Eisner =

Swedish sailor

Personal information
- Nationality: Swedish
- Born: 29 September 1941 (age 84) Gothenburg, Sweden

Sport
- Sport: Sailing

Lennart Eisner (born 29 September 1941) is a Swedish sailor. He competed in the Dragon event at the 1968 Summer Olympics.
