= Manuel Baiget =

Spanish sailor

Personal information
- Nationality: Spanish
- Born: 4 August 1945; Palma de Mallorca, Spain
- Died: 31 July 2007 (aged 61); Las Palmas de Gran Canaria, Spain

Sport
- Sport: Sailing

Manuel Baiget (4 August 1945 – 31 July 2007) was a Spanish sailor. He competed in the Dragon event at the 1968 Summer Olympics.
