= James Amos (sailor) =

Bermudian sailor (born 1936)

James F. Amos
Personal information
- Nationality: Bermudian
- Born: 16 October 1936 (age 88)

Sport
- Sport: Sailing

James F. Amos (born 16 October 1936) is a Bermudian sailor. He competed in the Dragon event at the 1972 Summer Olympics.
