= Robin Hennessy =

Irish sailor

Personal information
- Nationality: Irish
- Born: 28 February 1948 (age 77)

Sport
- Sport: Sailing

Robin Hennessy (born 28 February 1948) is an Irish sailor. He competed in the Dragon event at the 1972 Summer Olympics.
