= David Tucker (sailor) =

British sailor

Personal information
- Nationality: British
- Born: 29 September 1941 (age 83); Aldershot, England

Sport
- Sport: Sailing

David Tucker (born 29 September 1941) is a British sailor. He competed in the Dragon event at the 1968 Summer Olympics.
