= Fraser Beer =

New Zealand sailor

Personal information
- Nationality: New Zealand
- Born: 23 September 1949 (age 75); Palmerston North, New Zealand

Sport
- Sport: Sailing

Fraser Beer (born 23 September 1949) is a New Zealand sailor. He competed in the Dragon event at the 1972 Summer Olympics.
