= Klaus Oldendorff =

German sailor

Personal information
- Nationality: German
- Born: 14 April 1933; Lübeck, Germany
- Died: 17 March 2003 (aged 69); Verbier, Switzerland

Sport
- Sport: Sailing

Klaus Oldendorff (14 April 1933 – 17 March 2003) was a German sailor. He competed in the Dragon event at the 1968 Summer Olympics.
