= Daniel Trujillo =

Venezuelan sailor

Personal information
- Born: 24 May 1918; Sebastian, Venezuela

Sport
- Sport: Sailing

Daniel Trujillo (born 24 May 1918, date of death unknown) was a Venezuelan sailor. He competed in the Dragon event at the 1968 Summer Olympics.
