= César Sebök =

Argentine sailor

Personal information
- Nationality: Argentine
- Born: 29 November 1931 (age 93)

Sport
- Sport: Sailing

César Sebök (born 29 November 1931) was an Argentine sailor. He competed in the Dragon event at the 1972 Summer Olympics.
