= Frohmund Burger =

Venezuelan sailor

Personal information
- Nationality: Venezuelan
- Born: 11 June 1940 (age 84); Klagenfurt, Austria

Sport
- Sport: Sailing

Frohmund Burger (born 11 June 1946) is a Venezuelan sailor. He competed in the Dragon event at the 1968 Summer Olympics.
