= Chen Chih-fu =

Taiwanese sailor

Personal information
- Nationality: Taiwanese
- Born: 25 August 1943 (age 82)

Sport
- Sport: Sailing

Chen Chih-fu (born 25 August 1943) is a Taiwanese sailor. He competed in the Dragon event at the 1968 Summer Olympics.
