= Javier Velázquez (sailor) =

Mexican sailor

Personal information
- Full name: José Javier Velázquez Manero
- Born: 6 February 1924 Mexico City, Mexico

Sport
- Sport: Sailing

Javier Velázquez (born 6 February 1924) is a former Mexican sailor. He competed in the Dragon event at the 1968 Summer Olympics.
