= Peter Stülcken =

German sailor

Personal information
- Nationality: German
- Born: 2 May 1936 (age 88); Hamburg, Germany

Sport
- Sport: Sailing

Peter Stülcken (born 2 May 1936) is a German sailor. He competed in the Dragon event at the 1968 Summer Olympics.
