= Harry Byrne (sailor) =

Irish sailor

Personal information
- Nationality: Irish
- Born: 2 July 1929 (age 97)

Sport
- Sport: Sailing

Harry Byrne (born 2 July 1929) is an Irish sailor. He competed in the Dragon event at the 1972 Summer Olympics.
