= Sven Hanson =

Sven Hanson can refer to:

- Sven Hanson (sailor) (born 1941), Swedish Olympic sailor
- Sven Hanson (swimmer) (1892-1972), Swedish Olympic swimmer
