= Robin Judah =

British sailor (1930–2021)

Robin David Judah
Personal information
- Nationality: British
- Born: 18 June 1930 Calcutta, Bengal Presidency, British India
- Died: 12 August 2021 (aged 91)

Sport
- Sport: Sailing

Robin Judah (18 June 1930 – 12 August 2021) was a British sailor. He competed in the Dragon event at the 1968 Summer Olympics. Judah died on 12 August 2021, at the age of 91.
