= Noel Everett =

New Zealand sailor (1936–2006)

Personal information
- Nationality: New Zealand
- Born: 16 February 1936 Richmond, New Zealand
- Died: 12 August 2006 (aged 70) Howick, New Zealand

Sport
- Sport: Sailing

Noel Everett (16 February 1936 – 12 August 2006) was a New Zealand sailor. He competed in the Dragon event at the 1972 Summer Olympics.
