= Aleksander Bielaczyc =

Polish sailor

Personal information
- Nationality: Polish
- Born: 23 March 1947; Gdańsk, Poland
- Died: 30 August 1978 (aged 31); Bremen, Germany

Sport
- Sport: Sailing

Aleksander Bielaczyc (23 March 1947 – 30 August 1978) was a Polish sailor. He competed in the Dragon event at the 1972 Summer Olympics.
