= Hervé Roche =

Venezuelan sailor

Personal information
- Nationality: Venezuelan
- Born: 24 December 1948 (age 76); Bordeaux, France

Sport
- Sport: Sailing

Hervé Roche (born 24 December 1948) is a Venezuelan sailor. He competed in the Dragon event at the 1968 Summer Olympics.
