= Chang Jen-chih =

Taiwanese sailor

Personal information
- Nationality: Taiwanese
- Born: 23 September 1937 (age 87)

Sport
- Sport: Sailing

Chang Jen-chih (born 23 September 1937) is a Taiwanese sailor. He competed in the Dragon event at the 1968 Summer Olympics.
