= António Weck =

Portuguese sailor

Personal information
- Nationality: Portuguese
- Born: 11 November 1932; Lisbon, Portugal

Sport
- Sport: Sailing

António Weck (born 11 November 1932, died before 2008) was a Portuguese sailor. He competed in the Dragon event at the 1968 Summer Olympics.
