= Thomas Anderson (sailor) =

Australian sailor (1939–2010)

Personal information
- Full name: Thomas James Anderson
- Nickname: Tom
- Born: 24 July 1939 Sydney, New South Wales, Australia
- Died: 28 July 2010 (aged 71)
- Height: 183 cm (6 ft 0 in)
- Weight: 89 kg (196 lb)

Sailing career
- Sport: Sailing
- Class: Dragon
Medal record
Men's sailing
Representing Australia
Olympic Games
Gold medal – first place	1972 Munich	Dragon

Thomas James Anderson (24 July 1939 – 28 July 2010) was an Australian sailor and Olympic champion. He competed at the 1972 Summer Olympics in Munich, where he received a gold medal in the dragon class, together with crew members John Cuneo and John Shaw. He was the twin brother of John Anderson.

On 8 February 2000, Anderson was awarded the Australian Sports Medal for his gold medal-winning performance at 1972 Summer Olympics. In 2009, Anderson was inducted into the Queensland Sport Hall of Fame.

In 2018, Anderson was inducted to the Australian Sailing Hall of Fame alongside Cuneo and Shaw.

== See also ==
- List of Olympic medalists in Dragon class sailing
