= John Burrowes =

Jamaican sailor (born 1944)

Personal information
- Nationality: Jamaican
- Born: 28 December 1944 (age 80)

Sport
- Sport: Sailing

John Burrowes (born 28 December 1944) is a Jamaican sailor. He competed in the Dragon event at the 1972 Summer Olympics.
