= Gunnar Dahlgaard =

Danish sailor

Personal information
- Nationality: Danish
- Born: 27 April 1941 (age 83); Frederiksberg, Denmark

Sport
- Sport: Sailing

Gunnar Dahlgaard (born 27 April 1941) is a Danish sailor. He competed in the Dragon event at the 1972 Summer Olympics.
