= John Cuneo (sailor) =

Australian sailor (1928–2020)

Personal information
- Full name: John Bruce Cuneo
- Born: 16 June 1928 Sydney, New South Wales, Australia
- Died: 2 June 2020 (aged 91)
- Height: 168 cm (5 ft 6 in)
- Weight: 66 kg (146 lb)

Sailing career
- Sport: Sailing
- Class: Dragon
Medal record
Men's sailing
Representing Australia
Olympic Games
Gold medal – first place	1972 Munich	Dragon

John Bruce Cuneo OAM (16 June 1928 – 2 June 2020) was an Australian sailor and Olympic champion. He competed at the 1972 Summer Olympics in Munich, where he received a gold medal in the dragon class, together with crew members Thomas Anderson and John Shaw. Cuneo sailed on board Southern Cross, the defeated Australian challenger for the 1974 America's Cup. He was educated at the Anglican Church Grammar School.

Cuneo was inducted into the Sport Australia Hall of Fame in 1986 and into the Queensland Sport Hall of Fame in 2009. In 2018 Cuneo, Anderson and Shaw were inducted to the Australian Sailing Hall of Fame. Cuneo died on 2 June 2020, aged 91.

== See also ==
- List of Olympic medalists in Dragon class sailing
