= Lech Poklewski =

Polish sailor

Personal information
- Nationality: Polish
- Born: 29 January 1937 (age 88); Wilno, Poland

Sport
- Sport: Sailing

Lech Poklewski (born 29 January 1937) is a Polish sailor. He competed in the Dragon event at the 1972 Summer Olympics.
