= François Girard (sailor) =

French sailor (born 1948)

- Born: 3 December 1948 (age 77)

François Girard (French pronunciation: [fʁɑ̃swa ʒiʁaʁ]; born 3 December 1948) is a French sailor who competed in the 1972 Summer Olympics.
