= Vladimir Yakovlev (sailor) =

Soviet sailor

Personal information
- Nationality: Soviet
- Born: 14 March 1930; Saint Petersburg, Russia
- Died: 29 September 2009 (aged 79); Saint Petersburg, Russia

Sport
- Sport: Sailing

Vladimir Yakovlev (14 March 1930 – 29 September 2009) was a Soviet sailor. He competed in the Dragon event at the 1972 Summer Olympics.
