= Kurt Nyman =

Finnish sailor (born 1941)

Kurt Nyman (born 7 March 1941) is a Finnish former sailor who competed in the 1972 Summer Olympics.
