= Richard Kuchler =

German sailor (born 1951)

Richard Kuchler (born 4 June 1951) was a German sailor who competed in the 1972 Summer Olympics.
