= Don Cohan =

American sailor

Personal information
- Full name: Donald Smith Cohan
- Born: February 24, 1930 New York City, U.S.
- Died: October 20, 2018 (aged 88)
- Height: 5 ft 10 in (1.78 m)
- Weight: 181 lb (82 kg)

Sport
- Sport: Sailing
- Events: Dragon, Soling, and four other categories

Achievements and titles
- National finals: U.S. champion, European champion, German champion, and; Australian champion
Medal record
Sailing
Representing the United States
Olympic Games
Bronze medal – third place	1972 Munich	Dragon class

Donald Smith Cohan (February 24, 1930 in New York City – 20 October 2018) was an American sailer. He was one of the leading yachtsmen in the U.S. He was the first Jew to compete at the highest levels of world yachting competitions and at the time of his active career, the only Jew to win an Olympic medal in yachting.

He won a bronze medal at the 1972 Munich Olympics. Years later, he twice defeated Hodgkin's disease. He came back to win a U.S. sailing championship at the age of 72.

== Biography ==
Cohan graduated from Amherst College (cum laude; 1951). There, he was a member of Beta Theta Pi.

He then attended Harvard Law School. He practiced as an attorney, before going into business in real estate. He became President of Donesco Company, a real estate development firm.

== Sailing ==
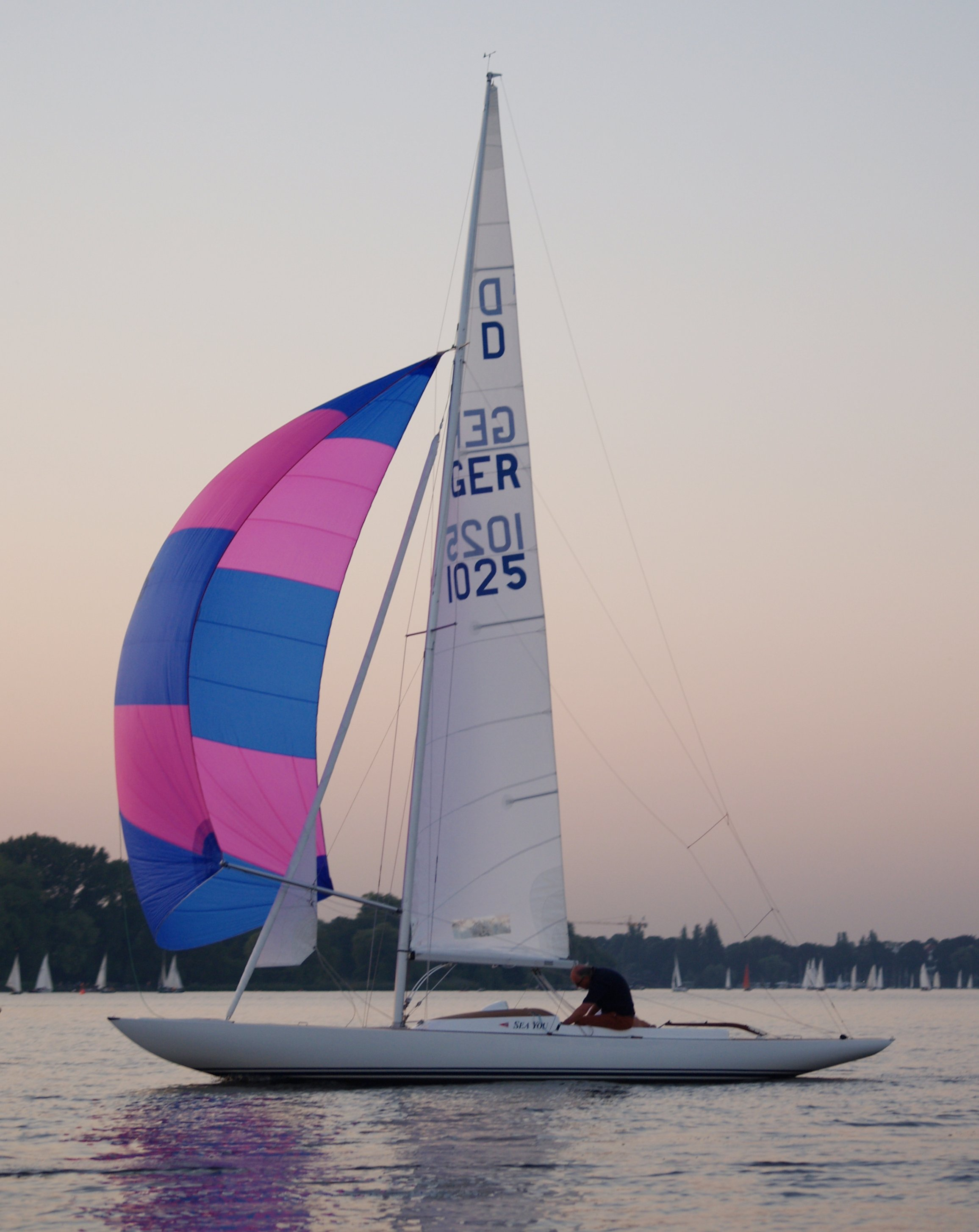
A Dragon keelboat

Cohan began sailing in 1967 at age 37. He was on the U.S. team at the World Championships in 1969, 1970, and 1971. Cohan then won the 1972 Olympic trials, becoming the first Jew to be a member of the U.S. Olympic Team in sailing.

In the 1972 Munich Summer Olympics, he was set to compete when the Munich Massacre resulted in the killing by terrorists of 11 Israeli athletes. All Jewish athletes were warned to leave, and two Israelis slated to compete in sailing were instructed to return home immediately. They handed Cohan their satin, blue and white triangular flag, emblazoned with "Sports Federation of Israel. XXth Olympiad Munich 1972," and said: "You're representing us now. Go win a medal for us."

Competing at the age of 42, he came from far back on the final day and earned a bronze medal as helmsman in the mixed three-person 29-foot (8.8 m) Dragon class, named Caprice. He earned the medal within just five years from when he began sailing, and was the first Jew to win an Olympic medal in sailing.

Cohan wrote: "The last act of [expletives deleted] [U.S. Olympic Committee head and International Olympic Committee president] Avery Brundage was to hang an Olympic medal around my neck." Brundage had been a Nazi sympathizer. He was notorious, among other things, for having pressured to have the only two Jews on the U.S. track team at the 1936 Berlin Olympics, sprinters Marty Glickman and Sam Stoller, removed at the very last moment on the morning of their 400-meter relay race, so as not to embarrass Hitler and the Nazis with a Jewish victory. Brundage later publicly praised the Nazi regime at a Madison Square rally.

Cohan has also been U.S. champion, European champion, German champion, and Australian champion.

In 1984, he put his legal skills to good use. He charged Robbie Haines, one of the competitors in the Olympic yachting Soling trials, with having left too early (or "barged") at the start of the race, in Long Beach, California. Ed Baird, a fellow competitor, said that Cohan "destroyed Haines in the protest room", but that "We're all still pretty close". Haines was disqualified for the race. In the end, however, Haines qualified for the 1984 Olympics, where he won a gold medal.

== Hodgkin's disease ==
Nineteen years after winning his Olympic medal, in 1991, he was diagnosed with Hodgkin's disease of the lymph glands and nodes, and was found to have the most severe type (4B). He was not expected to survive.

He said to himself, "Don, you may be very good in your line of business, but you know nothing about this one", and assembled a team around himself that he could rely on in his fight against the cancer. Cohan looked for excellent doctors who would allow him to undergo therapy usually considered too grueling for someone his age. He interviewed doctors, engaged a psychiatrist to help him deal with grief and fear, and told his wife she would be his deputy in the struggle. He went through aggressive chemotherapy and radiation therapy, suffered through fatigue, nausea, night sweats, swelling, and pain, and made it through the cancer successfully.

Then, though only one percent of patients get Hodgkin's disease a second time—he found himself in that category. Again, he was not expected to survive. Again, he underwent aggressive chemotherapy and radiation therapy. And again, he defeated the cancer.

== Sailing, post-Hodgkins ==
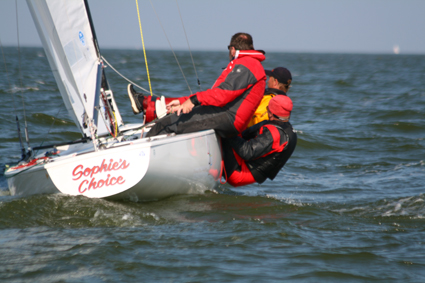
A Soling keelboat

In 2002, at the age of 72, he won the U.S. Soling Championship. He also finished 5th in the world championship.

Taking a step back to ruminate on sailing competitively at his age, Cohan remarked: "I'm aware that I'm on the downwind side of the hill, and the reawakened goal of being a competitive sailor has caused me to stir up banked fires and rejuvenate neglected physical abilities."

He was inducted into the Philadelphia Jewish Sports Hall of Fame in 2005.

In 2010, he was still sailing competitively.

== Philanthropy ==
Cohan has served as President of Jewish Employment and Vocational Service (JEVS) Human Services, as a member of the Directors Leadership Council of the University of Pennsylvania Abramson Cancer Center, and as a member of the Board of Directors of The Philadelphia Orchestra. In 1986 he made a gift of a dormitory to Amherst College; it was named the Cohan Dormitory in his honor in 1989.

== Select works ==
=== Books ===
- Importing practices & procedures: A reference manual (1964; Pennsylvania Bar Association, Committee on Continuing Legal Education)
- Pennsylvania Trusts (1964)

=== Articles ===
- "Pennsylvania Wait-and-See Perpetuity Doctrine – New Kernels from Old Nutshells", 28 Temple Law Quarterly 321 (Winter 1955)
- "Manufacturing Federal Diversity Jurisdiction by the Appointment of Representatives: Its Legality and Propriety", with Mercer Tate, 1 Villanova Law Review 201 (1956)
- "Legal, Tax, and Accounting Aspects of Fiduciary Appointment of Stock Proceeds: The Non-Statutory Pennsylvania Rules", with Stephen Dean, 106 University of Pennsylvania Law Review 2 (December 1957)
- "Considering Apportionment Consequences of Corporate Action", 21–22 The Shingle 57 (1958)
- "Law and Practicalities for Yachtsmen", 32 Temple Law Quarterly 241 (1958–59)
- "Pennsylvania Tentative Trusts", 110 University of Pennsylvania Law Review 972 (1962)
- "Accounting Considerations of Apportionment by Trustees of Receipts from Stock", 36 Temple Law Quarterly 121 (Winter 1963)
- "Legal and Practical Implications of Purchasing a Pleasure Boat – The Role of the Attorney", 37 Temple Law Quarterly 401 (1963)

== See also ==
- List of select Jews in sailing
- List of Olympic medalists in Dragon class sailing
- List of select cases of Hodgkin's Disease
