= Michel Alexandre =

French sailor (born 1946)

Michel Alexandre (born 20 June 1946) is a French sailor who competed in the 1968 Summer Olympics.
