= Konrad Weichert =

East German sailor

Medal record

Sailing

Representing East Germany

Olympic Games
Bronze medal – third place	1968 Mexico City	Dragon
Silver medal – second place	1972 Munich	Dragon

Konrad Weichert (20 March 1934 – 8 February 2003) was a German sailor, born in Kurznie. He won a silver medal in the Dragon class together with Paul Borowski and Karl–Heinz Thun at the 1972 Summer Olympics.
