= Schilksee =

Coordinates: 54°25′N 10°10′E

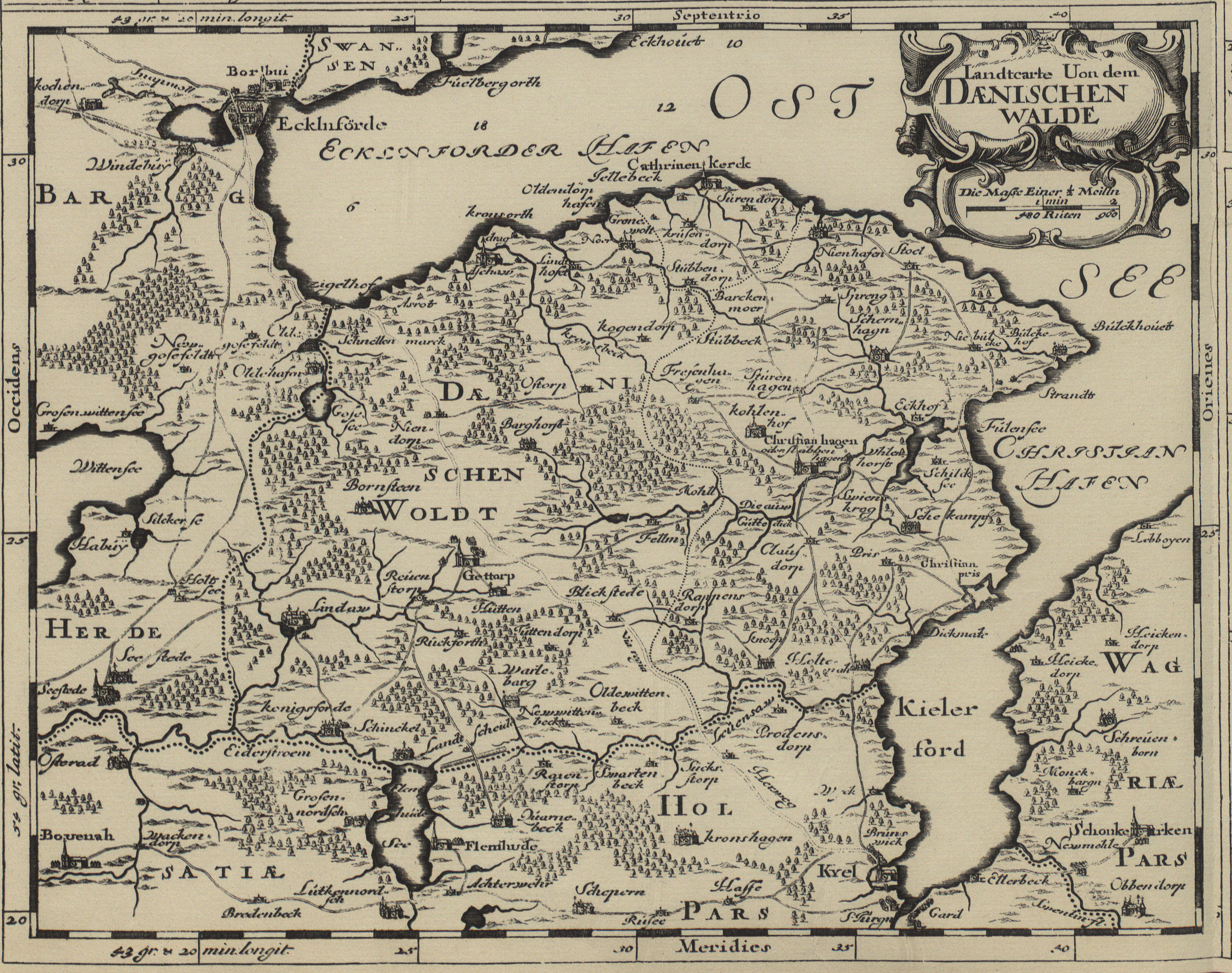
1652 map of the Danish Wahld; Schilksee is on the eastern side of the peninsula, north of Kiel

Schilksee (German pronunciation: [ˈʃɪlkˌzeː]) is a town on the Danish Wahld peninsula in the Kieler Förde. In 1959, the town was incorporated into the city of Kiel, therefore today sometimes named as Kiel-Schilksee (German pronunciation: [kiːl ˈʃɪlkˌzeː]).

The town is a popular vacation destination because of its beaches and houses several resorts.

Sailing events were held off Schilksee during the 1936 Summer Olympics.

During the 1972 Summer Olympics, held in Munich, Germany, the Olympic Yachting Center was built at Schilksee for the sailing events of the 1972 games.
