= Sven Hanson (sailor) =

Swedish sailor

Personal information
- Nationality: Swedish
- Born: 25 July 1941 (age 85) Gothenburg, Sweden

Sport
- Sport: Sailing

Sven Hanson (born 25 July 1941) is a Swedish sailor. He competed in the Dragon event at the 1968 Summer Olympics.

He sailed in a three person Keelboat and got ranked 6th.
