= Paul Borowski =

East German sailor (1937–2012)

Medal record

Sailing

Representing East Germany

Olympic Games
Bronze medal – third place	1968 Mexico City	Dragon
Silver medal – second place	1972 Munich	Dragon

Paul Borowski (19 March 1937 in Rostock – 22 December 2012 in Rostock) was a German sailor. He won a silver medal in the Dragon class together with crew members Konrad Weichert and Karl–Heinz Thun at the 1972 Summer Olympics.
