= Panagiotis Mikhail =

Greek sailor

Personal information
- Nationality: Greek
- Born: 27 June 1939 (age 85)

Sport
- Sport: Sailing

Panagiotis Mikhail (born 27 June 1939) is a Greek sailor. He competed in the Dragon event at the 1972 Summer Olympics.
