= Christopher McKinney =

Bahamian sailor

Personal information
- Nationality: Bahamian
- Born: 19 March 1950 (age 76)

Sport
- Sport: Sailing

Christopher McKinney (born 19 March 1950) is a Bahamian sailor. He competed in the Dragon event at the 1972 Summer Olympics.
