= Ioannis Kiousis =

Greek sailor

Personal information
- Nationality: Greek
- Born: 3 March 1945 (age 80)

Sport
- Sport: Sailing

Ioannis Kiousis (born 3 March 1945) is a Greek sailor. He competed in the Dragon event at the 1972 Summer Olympics.
