= Sven Gerner-Mathisen =

Norwegian sailor

Personal information
- Nationality: Norwegian
- Born: 25 November 1947 (age 77); Bærum, Norway

Sport
- Sport: Sailing

Sven Gerner-Mathisen (born 25 November 1947) is a Norwegian sailor. He was born in Bærum. He competed at the 1972 Summer Olympics in Munich.

Sven Gerner-Mathisen is the son of late Arild Gerner-Mathisen, founder of Gerner-Mathisen Shipping Ltd.
