= Ioannis Giapalakis =

Greek sailor

Personal information
- Nationality: Greek
- Born: 4 July 1943; Piraeus, Greece
- Died: 30 June 2018 (aged 74)

Sport
- Sport: Sailing

Ioannis Giapalakis (4 July 1943 – 30 June 2018) was a Greek sailor. He was born in Kastella, Piraeus. He competed in the Dragon event at the 1972 Summer Olympics. He continued actively sailing until his death at age 74.
