= Karl-Heinz Thun =

German sailor

Karl-Heinz
Personal information
- Full name: Karl-Heinz Thun
- National team: East Germany
- Citizenship: Germany
- Born: 29 April 1937
- Died: 15 June 1993 (aged 56)

Sport
- Sport: Sailing (three-person keel boat, open)

Achievements and titles
- Olympic finals: 1968 Mexico City 1972 Munich
- Updated on 2024-11-11

Karl-Heinz Thun (29 April 1937 – 15 June 1993) was a German sailor. He won a silver medal in the Dragon class together with Paul Borowski and Konrad Weichert at the 1972 Summer Olympics.

== Medals ==
Karl-Heinz won two medals in the Olympic Games, firstly, the Bronze Medal in 1968, and then the Silver in the next Olympics, in Munich.

Karl-Heinz Thun
Medal record

Sailing

Representing East Germany

Olympic Games
Bronze medal – third place	1968 Mexico City	Dragon
Silver medal – second place	1972 Munich	Dragon
