= Mikhail Khabarov =

Russian businessman (born 1971)

Mikhail Kharabov
- Born: 12 March 1971 (age 54); Zlatoust, Chelyabinsk, USSR
- Occupations: Businessman, Manager

Mikhail Valentinovich Khabarov (born 12 March 1971, in Zlatoust, Chelyabinsk, USSR) is a Russian businessman and manager. He is the current board president, and CEO of National Bank TRUST, an institution part of the Central Bank of Russia's activities to improve the national banking system.

== Biography ==
=== Education ===
Mikhail Khabarov joined the Moscow Institute of Steel and Alloys State Technological University (currently known as National University of Science and Technology MISiS). He graduated in 1993 in Automation of Technological Processes and Metallurgical Production. In 1994, he concluded his studies in the Higher Commercial School, under the Russian Federation's Ministry of Foreign Economic Relations. In 2001, he received his MBA from Pepperdine University (California, USA). Speculation in Russia suggested that the true motive of his departure from Russia to USA in the Fall of 1998, was a criminal prosecution from various of the most important managers of the financial and industrial group Magnitogorsk Iron and Steel Works. Khabarov was accused of embezzlement of a 30% stake in Magnitogorsk Iron and Steel Works, and asset withdrawal.

== Career ==
Mikhael Khabarov started his career as a window cleaner, and worked as an ice cream salesman. In 1993-1994, he was employed at the Department of Automation in the Ministry of Metallurgy of Russian Federadion. In an interview some years later, Khabarov recalled that, when applying for the job, the interviewer made the following note on his resume: “He has zero knowledge in finance, but he understands metallurgy,” and that he was then appointed on probation in the bank’s corporate finance department

=== Inkombank and Magnitogorsk Steel ===
In 1994, he was hired by Inkombank as manager-in-chief. In 1996, Khabarov moved to the office of Deputy Director of Economy, Finance, and Strategical Development in the financial and industrial group Magnitogorsk Steel, that along with Inkombank and FIG, held Magnitogorsk Iron and Steel Works (MMK). Khabarov worked in the team under Rashit Sharipov, Chairman of the Board of Directors of the Magnitogorsk Iron and Steel works. In the same year, he and his wife and son moved to the United States, and moved back to Russia after the statute of limitations for the criminal cases related to the Magnitogorsk Iron and Steel Works had expired.

=== ROSNO Asset Management Alliance ===
Back to Russia, Mikhail Khabarov was hired by the Finance Director of the Insurance Company ROSNO. In 2004, Khabarov created and presided over ROSNO Asset Management Alliance. According to Forbes, in the exact period, the co-owner of Alfa Capital, Mikhail Fridman was looking for a CEO. In May 2006, Khabarov left ROSNO with a group of specialists to Alfa Capital.

=== Alfa Group ===
In October 2010, he became president of the investments company A1 (Alfa Group's division of investments), while remaining Chairman of the Board of Directors at Alfa Capital. At the same time, he joined Supervisory Board of Alfa Group. Under Khabarov, A1 managed the Alfa Distressed Assets Fund (ADA), which redeemed troubled collateral assets from Alfa Group, and made them operational again before selling them on. In this process, nearly US$2 billions of toxic assets were brought under the control of A1.

Khabarov conducted A1 to become one of the most aggressive players in the market of hostile takeovers and applying all sorts of raider tools from quasi-legal methods to more primitive forms of exerting pressure, including initiating criminal cases against intractable opponents. Indeed, media reported on some of the most controversial cases in which A1 was involved, including the liquidation of the budget airline Avianova, the interception of liquid assets of Russia’s largest ceramic tile producer Stroyfarfor, the illegal takeover and its alleged manipulation of US and EU sanctions against defense enterprises Rostec and Uralvagonzavod, among others.

Khabarov's management of A1 lasted until December 2014. By the time Mikhail Khabarov was named for the National Trust Bank, in 2019, media called Khabarov "something between a racketeer and a collector". Since 2014, Khabarov has been co-owner and president of the logistics company Delovie Linii.

=== National Bank TRUST ===
In May 2019, he was named Prime First Deputy President-Chairman of the Management Board and Chief Executive Officer of the National Bank TRUST Non-core Assets. The bank was created to consolidate bad assets from an extensive clean-up of various financial institutions including Otkrytie FC, B&N Bank, Promsvyazbank. Khabarov is responsible for the issues related to money charges: administration and sales of assets, and debt collection. The amount of problematic assets consolidated in the bank amounts to 450 billion rubles. The president of the bank's council, Alexander Sokolov, by the time of Khabarov's appointment, appointed him as "a professional with good experience in the management of problematic assets". At the same time, media observed that Khabarov was recruiting former employees from A1, with dubious reputations to work with National Bank TRUST.

== Conflict within Delovie Linii ==
In 2015, Khabarov became co-owner of one of the largest logistics companies in Russia - Delovie Linii. In August 2017, Khabarov had a conflict with other co-owner Alexander Bogatikov. In September 2019, Solarstones Limited, a company from Seychelles, controlled by Khabarov, installed a lawsuit of US$25 million against Bogatikov and his company DL Management Limited, in the London Court of International Arbitration. Following a lawsuit filed by Solarstones Limited, the Primorsky District Court of St. Petersburg prohibited any transactions for eight companies included in the Delovie Linii group, and inspectorate No. 15 of the Federal Tax Service for St. Petersburg registered such transactions as subjects of injunctive relief on 18 October 2019

According to media reports, these injunctions represent the next stage of a raid on the Delovie Linii, with judge Natalya Karpenkova, who was disciplined for “gross and systematic violation of the procedural legislation” in 2012, a key figure in this regard.

== Hobbies ==
In his youth, Mikhail Khabarov had involvement in athletics, water and mountain skiing, but he's most notable for his career as an amateur poker player. His best result was 13th place in the No Limit Hold'em Event #4 in the EPT National in Sochi for a prize of US$7,963. He has a total of US$16,573 career earnings.
