= Theodor Sommerschield =

Norwegian sailor (1924–1986)

Personal information
- Born: 14 November 1924; Oslo, Norway
- Died: 29 November 1986 (aged 62); Oslo

Theodor Sommerschield (14 November 1924 – 29 November 1986) was a Norwegian competitive sailor. He was born in Oslo. He competed at the 1968 Summer Olympics in Mexico City, in the dragon class, and at the 1972 Summer Olympics in Munich.
