= Boris Khabarov =

Soviet sailor (born 1934)

Personal information
- Nationality: Soviet
- Born: 13 May 1934 (age 92)

Sport
- Sport: Sailing

Boris Aleksandrovich Khabarov (born 13 May 1934) is a Soviet former sailor. He competed in the Dragon event at the 1972 Summer Olympics. He began his career around age 15, when he joined the Leningrad yacht club.
