= Michael Keith Nunes =

Jamaican sailor

Personal information
- Born: 28 January 1918; Kingston, Colony of Jamaica, British Empire
- Died: 17 February 1996 (aged 78); Lime Cay, Jamaica

Sport
- Sport: Sailing

Michael Keith Nunes (28 January 1918 – 17 February 1996) was a Jamaican sailor. He competed in the Dragon event at the 1972 Summer Olympics.
