= Nikolay Gromov (sailor) =

Soviet sailor

Personal information
- Native name: Николай Громов
- Nationality: Soviet
- Born: 11 October 1929

Sport
- Sport: Sailing

Nikolay Gromov (born 11 October 1929) was a Soviet sailor. He competed in the Dragon event at the 1972 Summer Olympics.
