= René Sence =

French sailor

René Sence (16 September 1920 – 14 January 1998) was a French sailor who competed in the 1972 Summer Olympics in Munich.
