= Michael Anthony Nunes =

Jamaican sailor

Personal information
- Born: 10 October 1947 (age 77); Kingston, Colony of Jamaica, British Empire

Sport
- Sport: Sailing

Michael Anthony Nunes (born 10 October 1947) is a Jamaican sailor. He competed at the 1968 Summer Olympics and the 1972 Summer Olympics.
