= Franz Eisl =

Austrian sailor (1921–2019)

Personal information
- Nationality: Austrian
- Born: 17 March 1921; Gmunden, Austria
- Died: 12 July 2019 (aged 98)

Sport
- Sport: Sailing

Franz Eisl (17 March 1921 – 12 July 2019) was an Austrian sailor. He competed at the 1960 Summer Olympics and the 1972 Summer Olympics.
