= Godfrey Kelly =

Bahamian sailor (1928–2022)

Sir Godfrey Kelly KCMG (21 December 1928 – 10 February 2022) was a Bahamian sailor, born in the Bahamas, who competed in the 1960, 1964, 1968, and 1972 Summer Olympics.

Kelly was educated at Queen's College, Nassau, and McDonogh College Prep School, Baltimore, before training in law at Cambridge University and Middle Temple, London. He served in the cabinet of Sir Roland Symonette as Minister of Education between 1964 and 1967.

Kelly was appointed Companion of the Order of St Michael and St George (CMG) in the 1999 Birthday Honours and promoted to Knight Commander in the 2020 New Year Honours. He died in Nassau on 10 February 2022, at the age of 93.
