= Dragon (keelboat) =

International racing sailing class

International Dragon
- Class symbol

Development
- Designer: Johan Anker
- Location: Norway
- Year: 1929
- Design: One-Design

Boat
- Crew: 2–4; Maximum crew weight: 285 kg (628 lb)
- Draft: 1.20 m (3 ft 11 in)

Hull
- Type: Monohull
- Construction: Carvel; GRP; Cold moulded plywood Composite
- Hull weight: 1,700 kg (3,700 lb)
- LOA: 8.90 m (29.2 ft)
- LWL: 5.66 m (18.6 ft)
- Beam: 1.95 m (6 ft 5 in)

Hull appendages
- Keel: Fixed

Rig
- Rig type: Bermuda rig

Sails
- Mainsail area: 16.0 m^{2} (172 sq ft)
- Jib/genoa area: 11.7 m^{2} (126 sq ft)
- Spinnaker area: 23.6 m^{2} (254 sq ft)
- Upwind sail area: 27.7 m^{2} (298 sq ft)

Rating
- D-PN: 89.5
- RYA PN: 986

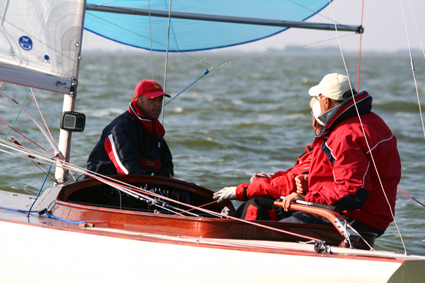
Dragon racing in 2008.

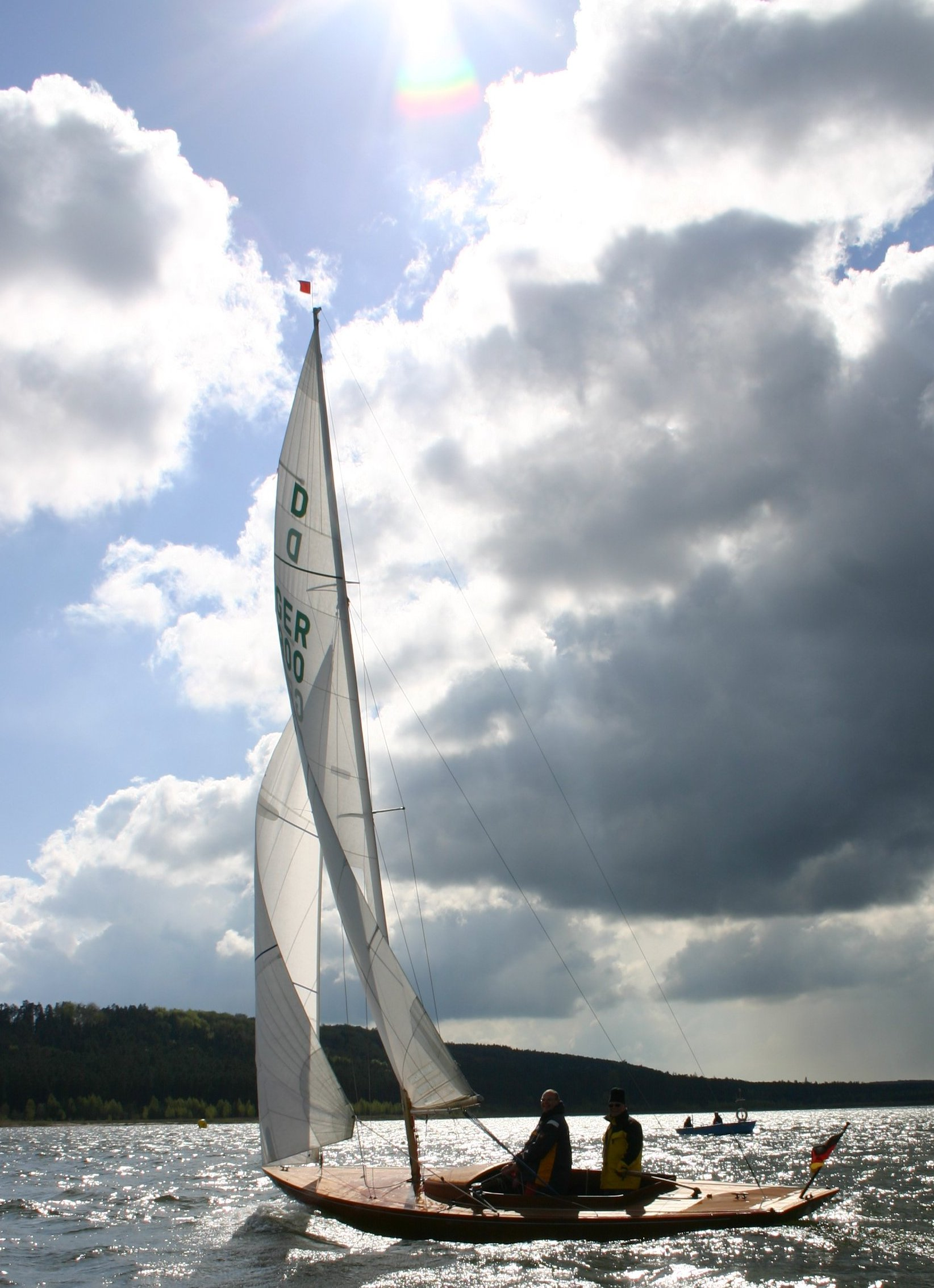
Wooden dragon, built by Abeking & Rasmussen (1954) on the Großer Brombachsee

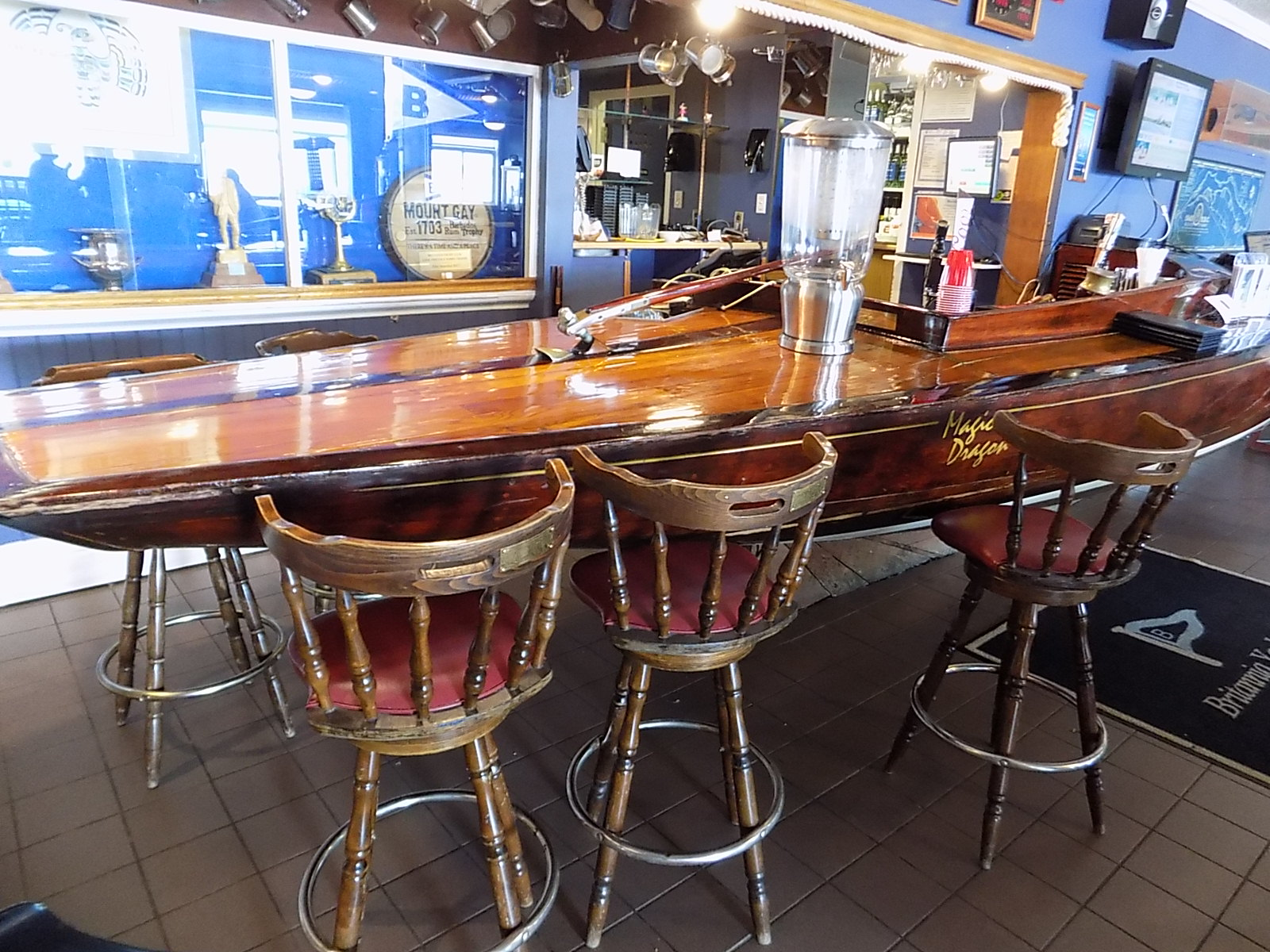
Magic Dragon used as a bar in Britannia Yacht Club's Dragon pub

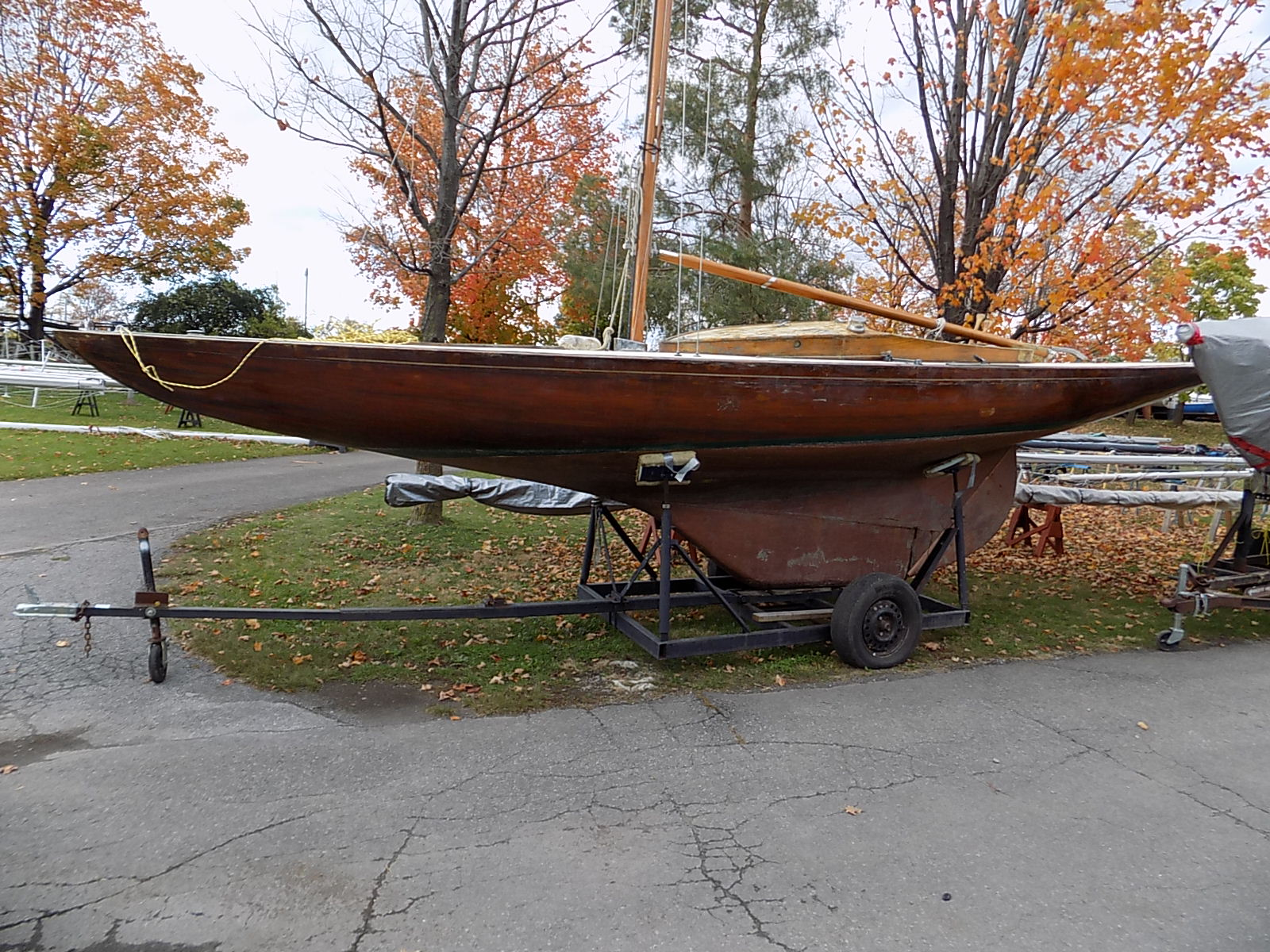
A wooden Dragon on its trailer, showing the keel shape and rudder arrangement

The Dragon (Norwegian: drake, drakebåt) is a one-design keelboat designed by Norwegian Johan Anker in 1929. In 1948 the Dragon became an Olympic Class, a status it retained until the Munich Olympics in 1972. The Dragon's long keel and elegant metre-boat lines remain unchanged, but today Dragons are constructed using the latest technology to make the boat durable and easy to maintain. GRP construction was introduced in 1973 and the rigging has been regularly updated.

The Dragon class is actively represented in over 26 countries on 5 continents. By 2004 there were 1,444 boats registered, and the number of boats built has averaged 45 per year. There are many more which are used for day sailing. The World Championships are held in every odd year and the European Championships are held annually. The Gold Cup, which can only be held in certain specified European countries, is unique in that all six races count without discard. It is held annually and often attracts over 100 entries, usually starting in one fleet.

A strong Class Association manages the class rules carefully to ensure safety, high quality and uniformity. Spars and sails have a wide range of adjustment during racing, allowing a skillful crew to optimize the boat for any conditions. Crew weight limits and restrictions on hiking out allow the Dragon to be raced successfully by a range of ages and both genders. It is possible to tow the Dragon behind many vehicles. It is often dry-sailed (a method that involves keeping the boat on land rather than in the water for maintenance purposes). It may be raced against boats of other classes, employing a Portsmouth Yardstick handicap of 986 or a D-PN of 89.5.

== History ==
The Dragon class was initiated by the Royal Gothenburg Yacht Club, who gave Norwegian yacht designer Johan Anker a brief for a cheap cruising/racing boat with about 20 square metres (220 sq ft) of sail area. After the Second World War, the boat was considered slow, and genoa and spinnaker were introduced.

The Dragon was one of the Vintage Yachting Classes in the Vintage Yachting Games in 2008 and 2012.

== Events ==
=== Olympic Games ===
Rank	Nation	Gold	Silver	Bronze	Total
1	Norway	2	0	0	2
2	Denmark	1	2	1	4
3	Sweden	1	2	0	3
4	United States	1	0	2	3
5	Australia	1	0	0	1
5	Greece	1	0	0	1
7	East Germany	0	1	1	2
8	Argentina	0	1	0	1
9	Great Britain	0	0	1	1
9	Italy	0	0	1	1
9	United Team of Germany	0	0	1	1
9	West Germany	0	0	1	1
Totals (12 entries)		7	6	8	21

Year	Gold	Silver	Bronze
1948 London	Norway (NOR); Thor Thorvaldsen; Haakon Barfod; Sigve Lie	Sweden (SWE); Folke Bohlin; Gösta Brodin; Hugo Johnson	Denmark (DEN); William Berntsen; Klaus Baess; Ole Berntsen
1952 Helsinki	Norway (NOR); Thor Thorvaldsen; Haakon Barfod; Sigve Lie	Sweden (SWE); Per Gedda; Erland Almqvist; Sidney Boldt-Christmas	Germany (GER); Theodor Thomsen; Erich Natusch; Georg Nowka
1956 Melbourne	Sweden (SWE); Folke Bohlin; Bengt Palmquist; Leif Wikström	Denmark (DEN); Ole Berntsen; Cyril Andresen; Christian von Bülow	Great Britain (GBR); Graham Mann; Ronald Backus; Jonathan Janson
1960 Rome	Greece (GRE); HRH Crown Prince Constantine; Odysseus Eskidioglou; Georgios Zaimis	Argentina (ARG); Jorge Salas Chávez; Héctor Calegaris; Jorge del Río Sálas	Italy (ITA); Antonio Cosentino; Antonio Ciciliano; Giulio De Stefano
1964 Tokyo	Denmark (DEN); Ole Berntsen; Christian von Bülow; Ole Poulsen	Germany (EUA); Peter Ahrendt; Wilfried Lorenz; Ulrich Mense	United States (USA); Lowell North; Richard Deaver; Charles Rogers
1968 Mexico City	United States (USA); George Friedrichs; Barton Jahncke; Gerald Schreck	Denmark (DEN); Aage Birch; Poul Richard Høj Jensen; Niels Markussen	East Germany (GDR); Paul Borowski; Karl-Heinz Thun; Konrad Weichert
1972 Munich	Australia (AUS); John Cuneo; Thomas Anderson; John Shaw	East Germany (GDR); Paul Borowski; Karl-Heinz Thun; Konrad Weichert	United States (USA); Donald Cohan; Charles Horter; John Marshall

=== World Championships ===
Year	Gold	Silver	Bronze	Ref.
1965 Sandhamn	White Lady (DEN); Ole Berntsen; Ole Poulsen; Jan Berntsen	Denmark; Aage Birch	Sweden; Jörgen Sundelin	
1967 Toronto	Williwaw (USA); George Friedrichs; Gerald Schreck; Barton Jahncke	United States; Robert Mosbacher	France; René Sence	
1969 Palma de Mallorca	Aphrodite (USA); Robert Mosbacher; George Francisco III; David Saville	Australia; John Cueno; Ross Bradbury; John Shaw	East Germany; Roland Schwarz; Jörg Pfeiffer; Lothar Köpsell	
1971 Hobart	Debutante (SWE); Jörgen Sundelin; Peter Sundelin; Ulf Sundelin	Australia; Norman Booth	Denmark; Axel Holm	
1973 Athens	Crux (SWE); Roger Eliasson; Johan Palmquist; Jerry Burman	West Germany; Oldenburg; May; Meyer	Denmark; Børge Børresen	
1975 Rochester	Galejan 2 (SWE); Bengt Palmquist; Johan Palmquist; Björn Palmquist	Canada; Bob Burgess	United States; Craig	
1977 Thun	U-2 (AUT); Harry Ferreberger; Franz Eisl; Herbert Spitzbart	West Germany; Ulrich; Hofmann; Hösch	Switzerland; Wittwer; Wittwer; Wittwer	
1979 Geelong	Kirribilli (AUS); Robert Porter; Ian Porter; Robbie Antill	West Germany; Markus Glas	Australia; Barry Calvert; Tim Watts; Ted Laing	
1981 Trawemünde	Sandokan (FRG); Marcus Glas; Mucki Binder; Heiner Henwig	Denmark; Børge Børresen; Ole Børresen; Goodall	Sweden; Clander; Hansson; Nordin	
1983 Vancouver	Mistral (CAN); Bob Burgess; Nigel Brown; Shane Korman	Australia; Ross Stiffe	Australia; Jamie Wilmot	
1985 Douarnenez	Cato (FRG); Wolf Rappel; Michael Lipp; Michael Obermeier			
1987 Geelong	Nordjyllong (DEN); Valdemar Bandolowski; Søren Hvalsø; Erik Hansen	West Germany; Andreas Lohmann; Jorg Mossnang; Paul Vestner	Australia; Stephen Boyes	
1989 Torbay	Danish Blue (DEN); Poul Richard Høj Jensen; Erik Hansen; Jan Persson			
1991 Toronto	Krystle (AUS); Stephen Boyes; Stephen Jackson; Stephen Peel			
1993 Trawemünde	Senior BB (DEN); Jesper Bank; Ole Børresen; Børge Børresen	Denmark; Poul Richard Høj Jensen; Claus Høj Jensen; Sebastian Ziegelmayer	Germany; Andreas van Eicken; Rolf Schöppler; Johan van Eicken	
1995 Fremantle	Karabos VIII (AUS); Nick Rogers; Leigh Behrens; Andrew Burnett	Denmark; Poul Richard Høj Jensen; Klaus Jensen; Richard Goldsmith	Australia; Willy Packer; Peter Hay; Geoff Wedgwood; Grantham Kitto	
1997 Maarstrand	Sanne (DEN); Jesper Bank; Claus Olsen; Ole Børresen	Denmark; Poul Richard Høj Jensen	Germany; Markus Glas	
1999 Fort-de-France	Maria (DEN); Claus Høj Jensen; Bo Reker Andersen; Jes Hovgaard	Netherlands; Fred Imhoff; Richard van Ry; Sven Machielsen	Denmark; Peter Holm; Maria Holm; Søren Kæstel	
2001 Hornbæk	GER 956; Malte Philipp (GER); Torsten Imbeck; Enver Adakan	GER 947; Werner Fritz (GER); Dieter Schoen; Andreas Huber	DEN 317; Frank Eriksen (DEN); Jørgen Bonde; Ole Børresen	
2003 Hobart	GER 982 - Chrisco; Dieter Schön (GER); Vincent Hösch; Andreas Huber	AUS 180 - KARABOS VIII; Nick Rogers (AUS); Leigh Behrens; Peter Lilley	AUS 166 - Kirribilli II; David Graney (AUS); Martin Graney; Murray Jones	
2005 Neustadt	DEN 365 - African Queen; Jørgen Schönherr (DEN); Anders Kaempe; Axel Waltersdorph	GER 950 - Occasion; Harm Müller-Spreer (GER); Markus Wieser; Thomas Auracher	SUI 296 - HLL-Ariston; Vincent Hoesch (GER); Harro Kniffka; Max Scheibmair	
2007 Dun Laoghaire	GER 996 - Sinewave; Tommy Müller (GER); Vincent Hoesch (GER); Max Sheibmayr (GER)	SUI 299 - Gaudium; Ulli Libor (GER); Stephan Hellriegel (GER); Frank Butzmann (GER)	GBR 708 - Rumours; Len Jones (GBR); Claus Høj Jensen (DEN); Jamie Lea (GBR)	
2009 Medemblik	GBR 745; Poul Richard Høj Jensen (DEN); Theis Palm (DEN); Lars Jensen (DEN)	UKR 7 Lars Hendriksen (DEN); Michael Hestbæk (DEN); Sergei Pugachev (UKR)	DEN 396; Jørgen Schönherr (DEN); Axel Waltersdorph (DEN); Christian Videbæk (DEN)	
2011 Melbourne	GBR 751 - Alfie; Lawrie Smith (GBR); Timothy Tavinor (GBR); Ossie Stewart (GBR)	UKR 7 - Bunker Queen; Markus Wieser (GER); Sergey Pugachev (UKR); Matti Paschen (UKR)	DEN 266 - My-Way; Frank Berg (DEN); Søren Holm (DEN); Søren Kæstel (DEN)	
2013 Weymouth	GBR 758 - Fever; Klaus Diederichs (GBR); Andy Beadsworth (GBR); Jamie Lea (GBR)	RUS 76 - Strange Little Girl; Andrey Kirilyuk (RUS); Aleksey Bushuev (RUS); Alina Dotsenko (RUS)	UKR 7 - Bunker Queen; Markus Wieser (GER); Sergey Pugachev (UKR); Matti Paschen (UKR)	
2015 La Rochelle	UAE 8 - Bunker Boys; Yevhen Braslavets (UKR); Aleksander Mirchuk (UKR); Serhiy Timokhov (UKR)	RUS 76 - Strange Little Girl; Dimitri Samokhin (RUS); Andrey Kirilyuk (RUS); Aleksey Bushuev (RUS)	UAE 7 Bunker Queen; Markus Wieser (GER); Sergey Pugachev (UKR); George Leonchuk (UKR)	
2017 Cascais	TUR 1212 - Provezza Dragon; Andy Beadsworth (GBR); Ali Tezdiker (TUR); Simon Fry (GBR)	RUS 27 - Annapurna; Anatoly Lognov (RUS); Vadim Statsenko (RUS); Alexander Shalagin (RUS)	GBR 815 - Alfie; Lawrie Smith (GBR); Hugo Rocha (POR); Gonçalo Ribeiro (POR); João Matos Rosa (POR)	
2019 Fremantle	TUR 1212 - Provezza Dragon; Andy Beadsworth (GBR); Ali Tezdiker (TUR); Simon Fry (GBR)	GBR 820 - Louise Racing; Grant Gordon (GBR); Ruairidh Scott (GBR); Sophia Weguelin (GBR); James Williamson	GBR 819 - Fever; Klaus Diederichs (GBR); Jamie Lea (GBR); Diego Negri (ITA)	
2022; Kühlungsborn	GBR 819 - Fever; Klaus Diederichs (GBR); Jamie Lea (GBR); Diego Negri (ITA)	TUR 1212 - Provezza Dragon; Andy Beadsworth (GBR); Simon Fry (GBR); Arda Baykal (TUR)	SUI 318 - 1quick1 Wolf Waschkuhn (GBR); Joao Vidinha (POR); Charles Nankin (RSA)	
2023; Bodrum	SUI 318 - 1quick1 Wolf Waschkuhn (GBR); Joao Vidinha (POR); Charles Nankin (RSA)	GBR 820 - Louise Racing; Grant Gordon (GBR); Luke Patience (GBR); James Williamson (GBR); Faye Chatterton (GBR)	GBR 192 - Bluebottle; Graham Bailey (GBR); Julia Bailey (GBR); Ruairidh Scott (GBR); Will Bedford (GBR)	

=== Vintage Yachting Games ===
Rank	Nation	Gold	Silver	Bronze	Total
1	Netherlands (NED)	1	1	0	2
2	Ukraine (UKR)	1	0	0	1
3	Great Britain (GBR)	0	1	0	1
4	Australia (AUS)	0	0	1	1
4	Russia (RUS)	0	0	1	1
Totals (5 entries)		2	2	2	6

Event	Gold	Silver	Bronze
2008 Medemblik	Netherlands (NED); Reinier Wissenraet; Gijs Evers; Marc Reijnhoudt	United Kingdom (GBR); Miss Gavia Wilkimson-Cox; Ron Rosenberg; Jon Mortimer	Australia (GER); Gordon Ingate; David Giles; Keith Musto
2012 Lake Como	Ukraine (UKR); Yevgen Braslavetz; Georgii Leonchuk; Sergey Timokhov	Netherlands (NED); Reinier Wissenraet; Pim ten Harmsen van der Beek; Marc Reijnhoudt	Russia (RUS); Vasiliy Senatorov; Igor Ivashintsov; Aleksandr Muzychenko
2018 Copenhagen	No Dragon representation.		

=== European Championships ===
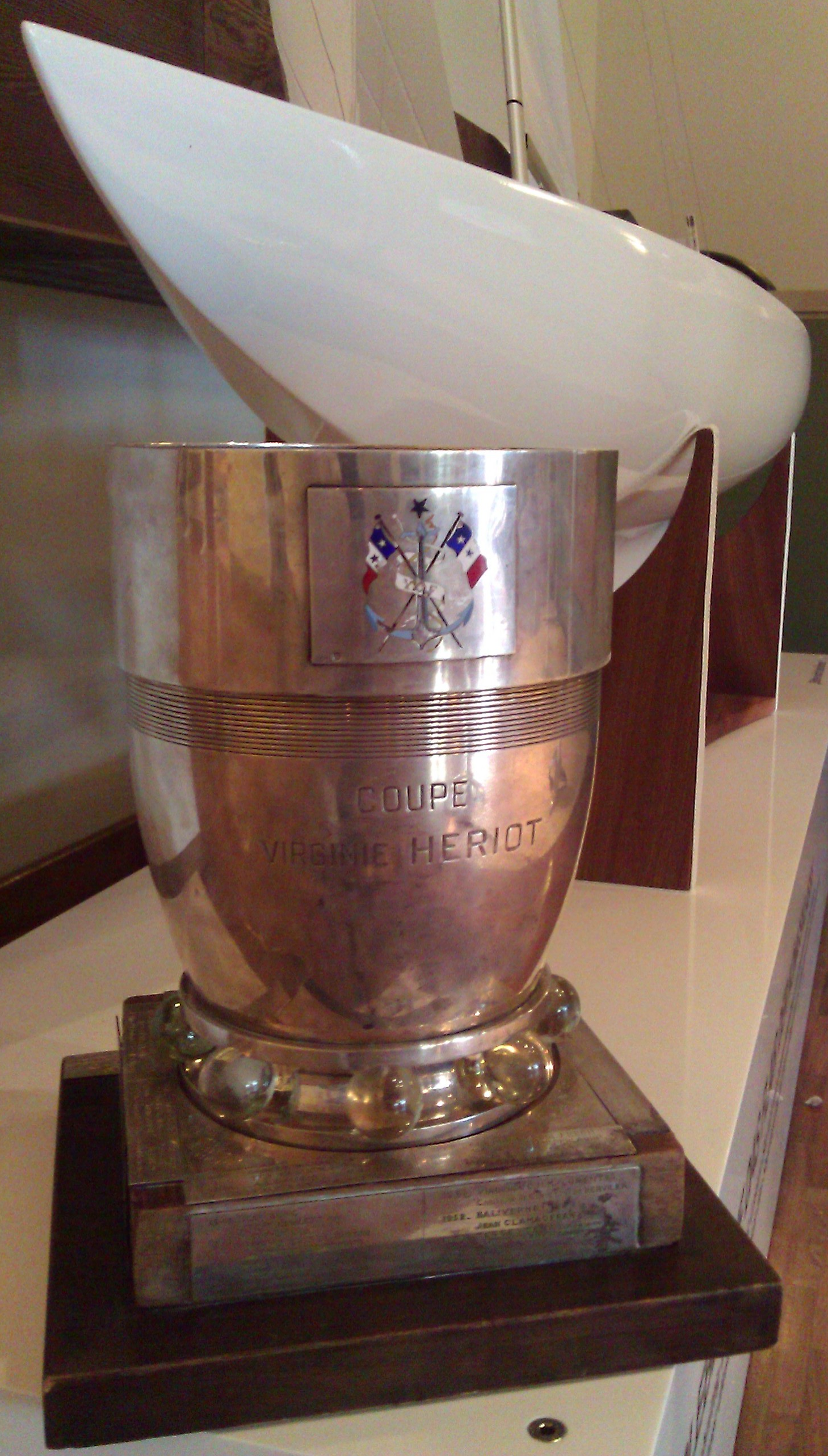
Coupe Virginie Hériot

In memory of Madame Virginie Hériot and in accordance with her often expressed wish to encourage yachting, the Committee of the Yacht Club de France decided at a meeting on 21 May 1946 to initiate an International Cup and name it the "Coupe Virginie Hériot". The Cup is assigned to the International Dragon Class, but remains the property of the Yacht Club de France. In agreement with the Committee of the International Dragon Association the "Coupe Virginie Hériot" is the main trophy of the European Dragon Championship. The event is now held annually.

Year	Gold	Silver	Bronze
1978 Ostend	Netherlands; Ed Frech; Jan Bakker; Steven Vis		
1979			
1980	Austria; C. Scheineker		
1982	West Germany; Markus Glas		
1984	Denmark; Børge Børresen		
1986	West Germany; Markus Glas		
1987	West Germany; Markus Glas		
1988	Denmark; Poul Richard Høj Jensen		
1990	Denmark; Lars Hendriksen		
1992	Denmark; Poul Richard Høj Jensen		
1994	Germany; M. Erhard		
1995	Germany; H. Erich		
1996	Denmark; Poul Richard Høj Jensen		
1998	Netherlands; Fred Imhoff		
2000	Denmark; Poul Richard Høj Jensen		
2002 Thun	Germany; M. Erhard		
2003 Kinsale	Netherlands; Fred Imhoff; Richard van Rij; Rudy den Outer	Switzerland; Vincent Hoesch; Horro Kniffka; Bernd Faber	Denmark; Frank Berg; Soren Kaestel; Mads Christensen
2004 Tallinn	Germany; Harm Muller-Spreer	Denmark; Frank Berg	Germany; Werner Fritz
2005 La Trinité-sur-Mer	Denmark; Claus Høj Jensen	Great Britain; Poul Richard Høj Jensen	France; J. Pasturaud
2006 Cowes	Denmark; Lars Hendriksen		
2007 Hanko	Germany; Markus Wieser; Sergei Pughchev; Thomas Auracher	Germany; Wolfgang Rappel; Hans Jürgen Benze; Michael Lipp	Finland; Henrik Dahlman; Lars Henriksen; Oscar Dannström
2008 Oslo	Russia; Maxim Logutenko; Mikhail Senatorov; Vladimir Krutskih	Russia; Dmitry Berezkin; Igor Goihberg; Alexei Bushhuev	Germany; Thomas Müller; Vincent Hoesch; Maximilian Scheibmeyr
2009 St. Tropez	Ukraine; Markus Wieser; Sergey Pughchev; Matti Paschen	Germany; Markus Glas; Max Glas; Andreas Lohmann	Ukraine; Eugen Braslavets; Sergey Timokov; Michael Hestbek
2010 Balatonkenese	Ukraine; Markus Wieser; Sergey Pughchev; Matti Paschen	Russia; Dmitry Berezkin; Anatoly Kudritskiy; Aleksey Bushuev	Russia; Anatoly Logonov; Andrey Kirilyuk; Alexander Shalagin
2011 Boltenhagen	Denmark; Jens Christensen; Kim Andersen; Anders Bagger	Ukraine; Markus Wieser; Sergey Pughchev; Matti Paschen	Ukraine; Evgeny Braslavetz; Sergey Timokhov; Olexandr Myrchuk
2012 Attersee	Ukraine; Markus Wieser; Sergey Pughchev; Matti Paschen	Germany; Marcus Brennecke; Vincent Hoesch; Michael Lipp	Russia; Victor Fogelson; Oleg Khoperskiy; Vicheslav Kaptyukhin
2013 Cascais	Portugal; Jose Matoso; Gustavo Lima; Frederico Melo	Ukraine; Markus Wieser; Sergey Pughchev; Georgii Leonchuk	Denmark; Jens Christensen; Kim Andersen; Anders Bagger
2014 San Remo	Denmark; Lars Hendriksen; Kleen Frithjof; Anders Bagger	United Arab Emirates; Markus Wieser; Sergey Pughchev; Georgii Leonchuk	United Arab Emirates; Evgeny Braslavetz; Sergey Timokhov; Igor Sodorov
2015 Båstad	United Arab Emirates; Evgeny Braslavetz; Sergey Pughchev; Georgii Leonchuk	United Arab Emirates; Hendrik Witzmann; Theis Palm; Markus Koy	Russia; Anatoly Logonov; Alexander Shalagin; Vadim Statsenko
2016 St. Petersburg	Russia; Anatoly Loginov; Alexander Shalagin; Vadim Statsenko	Germany; Stephan Link; Frank Butzmann; Michael Lipp	Germany; Markus Brennecke; Jochen Schümann; Theis Palm
2017 Thun	Pow Wow (POR); Pedro Andrade; Bernardo Torres Pego; Charles Nankin	Rocknrolla (RUS); Dimitry Samokhin; Andrey Korolyuk; Alexey Bushuev	Bunker Prince (RUS); Yevhen Braslavets; Sergey Pugachev; Sergey Timokhof

=== Gold Cup ===
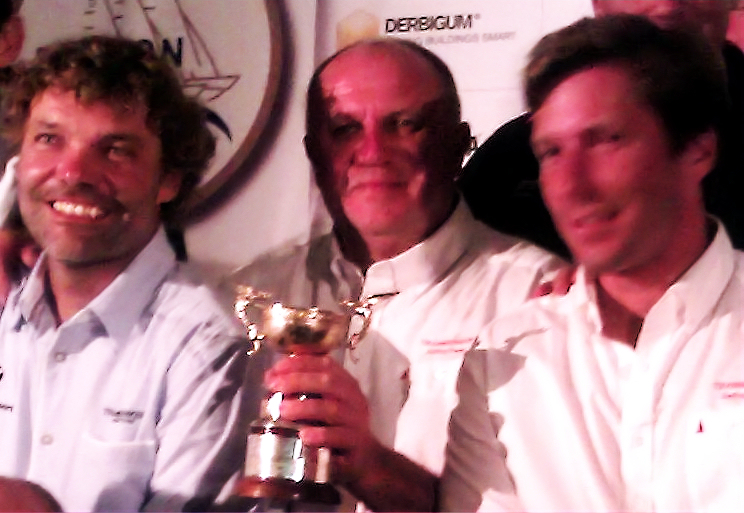
The Winners of the 2011 Dragon Gold Cup: Markus Wieser, Sergey Pughchev and Matti Paschen with the Gold Cup.

The International Dragon Cup was presented in 1937 by members of the Clyde Yacht's Conference with the intention of bringing together as many competitors of different nationalities as possible for yacht racing in Europe in a friendly spirit, in order to perpetuate the good feeling which existed at the first International Clyde Fortnight. The Clyde Yacht Clubs' Conference has been reconstituted as the Clyde Yacht Clubs' Association and the International Dragon Cup has become known as, and is now renamed, the 'Dragon Gold Cup'.

Members of the Clyde Yacht Clubs' Association created specific rules for this competition and donated a perpetual trophy made of pure gold for an annual international race. From the beginning, the Gold Cup was considered a family event for the Dragon Sailors and could be raced by yachts of the International Dragon Class belonging to any country, and for this reason was a very well attended event.

Until 1965, the year of the first Official World Championship, the Gold Cup was considered the unofficial World Cup. The first rules created by the Clyde Yacht Clubs' Association established that the Cup should be sailed annually and that the Cup should be retained by the winner for one year only. It also established that the event should take place in rotation in the following countries: Scotland, France, Sweden, Germany, Holland and Denmark.

With the revision of the rules in 1997, the number of hosting countries was enlarged to eleven: Belgium, Denmark, France, Germany, Ireland, Netherlands, Norway, Portugal, Spain, Sweden and the United Kingdom.

The hosting country and the Organising Authority continue to be selected by the Clyde Yacht Clubs' Association in conjunction with the International Dragon Association and the number of participants was limited to 120.

== Class association ==
The International Dragon Association (IDA) was founded on 31 October 1961 with London as its headquarters. The principal objects of the IDA are:

- To further the interests of the International Dragon Class in all countries where Dragons are sailed and to introduce the Class to new countries.
- To be responsible for the administration of the class rules and coordinating proposals for rule amendments for consideration by the International Sailing Federation (ISAF).
- To ensure that the class retains its "International" status by complying with the criteria adopted by the ISAF.
- To co-ordinate and select venues for the following international championships:
  - World Championships
  - European Championships
  - Gold Cups
- To produce regular newsletters containing information about the Class and the activities of the IDA for distribution to all Dragon sailors throughout the world.
- Membership is open to National Dragon Class Associations.

=== Class officers ===
==== Vice-Presidents ====
- H.R.H. King Frederik of Denmark
- Christopher Dicker
- Poul Richard Høj Jensen

==== Chairman ====
Period	Country	Chairman	Major achievement
1961–1965	United Kingdom	Sir Gordon Smith	
1966	France	F Thierry-Mieg	
1967–1969	United Kingdom	Sir Gordon Smith	
1970–1972	France	F Thierry-Mieg	
1973–1975	United Kingdom	P Dyas	
1976–1978	France	P Manset	
1979–1981	United Kingdom	P Dyas	
1982–1984	France	P Manset	
1985–1988	Ireland	C Doyle	
1989–1992	Germany	N Geissler	
1993–1994	Finland	T Nurmilaukas	
1995–1996	United Kingdom	Chris Dicker	
1997–2000	Portugal	C. R. Ferreira	
2001–2004	Sweden	Thomas Olrog	
2005–2006	Germany	Rupert Fischer	
2007–2010	United Kingdom	Rob Campbell	
2011–2015	Netherlands	Richard Blickman	
2015–2019	Russia	Vasily Senatorov	
2019–2021	Monaco	Jens Rathsack	
2021–2025	France	Gerard Blanc	
2025–	Hong Kong	Bram van Olphen	
