= List of Olympic medalists in sailing =

This is a list of Olympic medalists in sailing.

== Olympic medalist by discipline ==
- List of Olympic medalists in sailing by discipline

== Olympic medalist by class ==
- List of Olympic medalists in sailing by class
