= Soling European Championship results (1968–1979) =

Soling European Championships

Soling
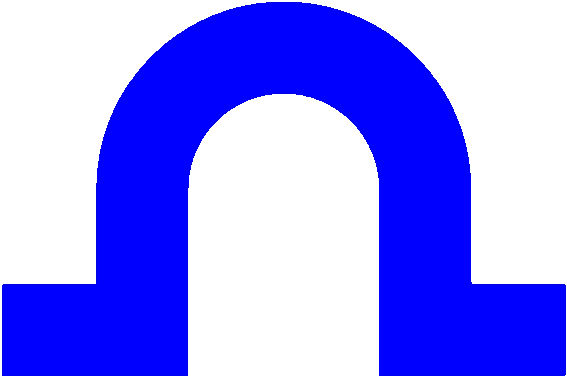

Development
- Name: Soling

The main article describes all European Soling Championships from one the first held in 1968 to the announced Championships in the near future. This article states the detailed results, where relevant the controversies, and the progression of the Championship during the series race by race of the European Soling Championships in the years 1968, 1969, 1970, 1971, 1972, 1973, 1974, 1975, 1976, 1977, 1978 and 1979. This is based on the major sources: World Sailing, the world governing body for the sport of sailing recognized by the IOC and the IPC, and the publications of the International Soling Association. Unfortunately not all crew names are documented in the major sources.

== 1968 Final results ==
1968
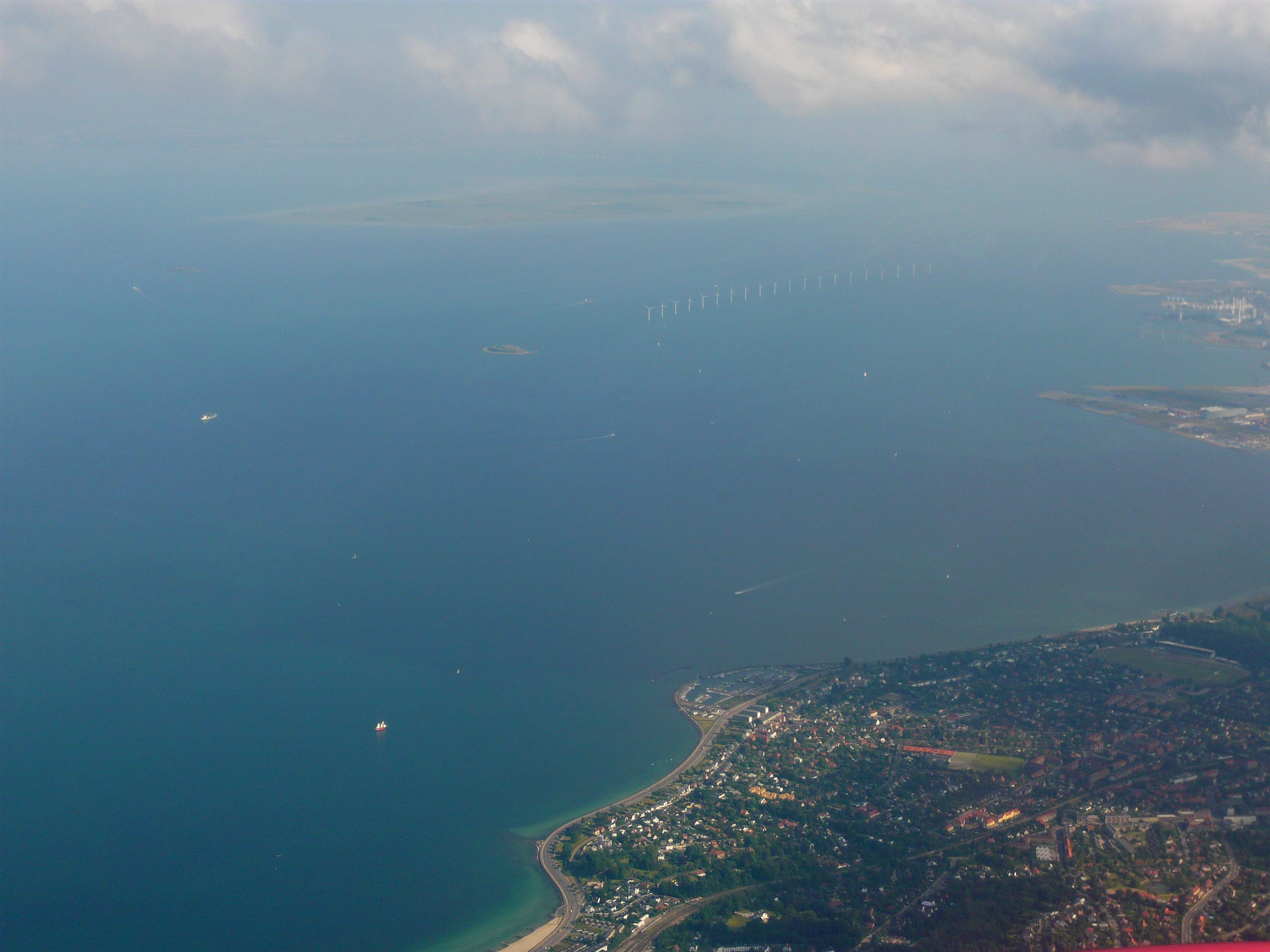

Event title
- Edition: 1
- Host: Kongelig Dansk Yachtklub (KDY)

Event details
- Venue: Skovshoved, Denmark
- Dates: 15–22 July
- Yachts: 25
- Opening ceremony: 16 July

Competitors
- Competitors: 75

Results
- (gold) Gold: Norway; Per Spilling; Jim Mc Elvin; Dag Blomdal
- (silver) Silver: Netherlands; Geert Bakker; Nomen nescio
- (bronze) Bronze: Denmark; Niels Bolt Jörgensen; Nomen nescio

Only the results of the top five boats were documented.

Rank	Country	Helmsman	Crew	Sail No.	Race 1		Race 2		Race 3		Race 4		Race 5		Race 6		Total	Total – discard
Rank	Country	Helmsman	Crew	Sail No.	Pos.	Pts.	Pos.	Pts.	Pos.	Pts.	Pos.	Pts.	Pos.	Pts.	Pos.	Pts.	Total	Total – discard
1st place, gold medalist(s)	NOR	Per Spelling	Jim Mc Elvin; Dag Blomdal	N 7	1	0.0	1	0.0	~~RET~~	~~32.0~~	6	11.7	3	5.7	2	3.0	52.4	20.4
2nd place, silver medalist(s)	NED	Geert Bakker	Nomen nescio	H 1	2	3.0	~~10~~	~~16.0~~	1	0.0	5	10.0	4	8.0	1	0.0	37.0	21.0
3rd place, bronze medalist(s)	DEN	Niels Bolt Jörgensen	Nomen nescio	D 19	4	8.0	~~5~~	~~10.0~~	3	5.7	1	0.0	2	3.0	5	10.0	36.7	26.7
4	NOR	Finn Ferner	Nomen nescio	N 2	~~6~~	~~11.7~~	2	3.0	5	10.0	2	3.0	1	0.0	6	11.7	39.4	27.7
5	DEN	Tom Carlsen	Nomen nescio	D 18	5	10.0	3	5.7	6	11.7	4	8.0	6	11.7	~~7~~	~~13.0~~	60.1	47.1

Legend: DNF – Did not finish; DNS – Did not start; DSQ – Disqualified;
Discard is crossed out and does not count for the overall result.

- 1968 Progress

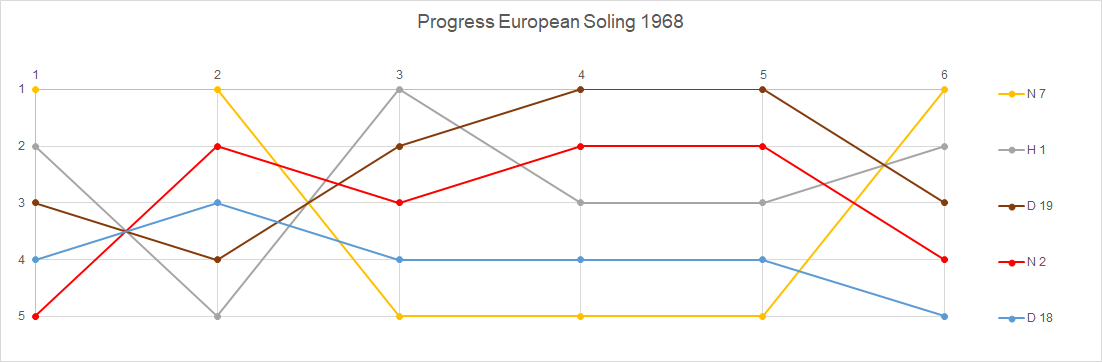

== 1969 Final results ==
1969
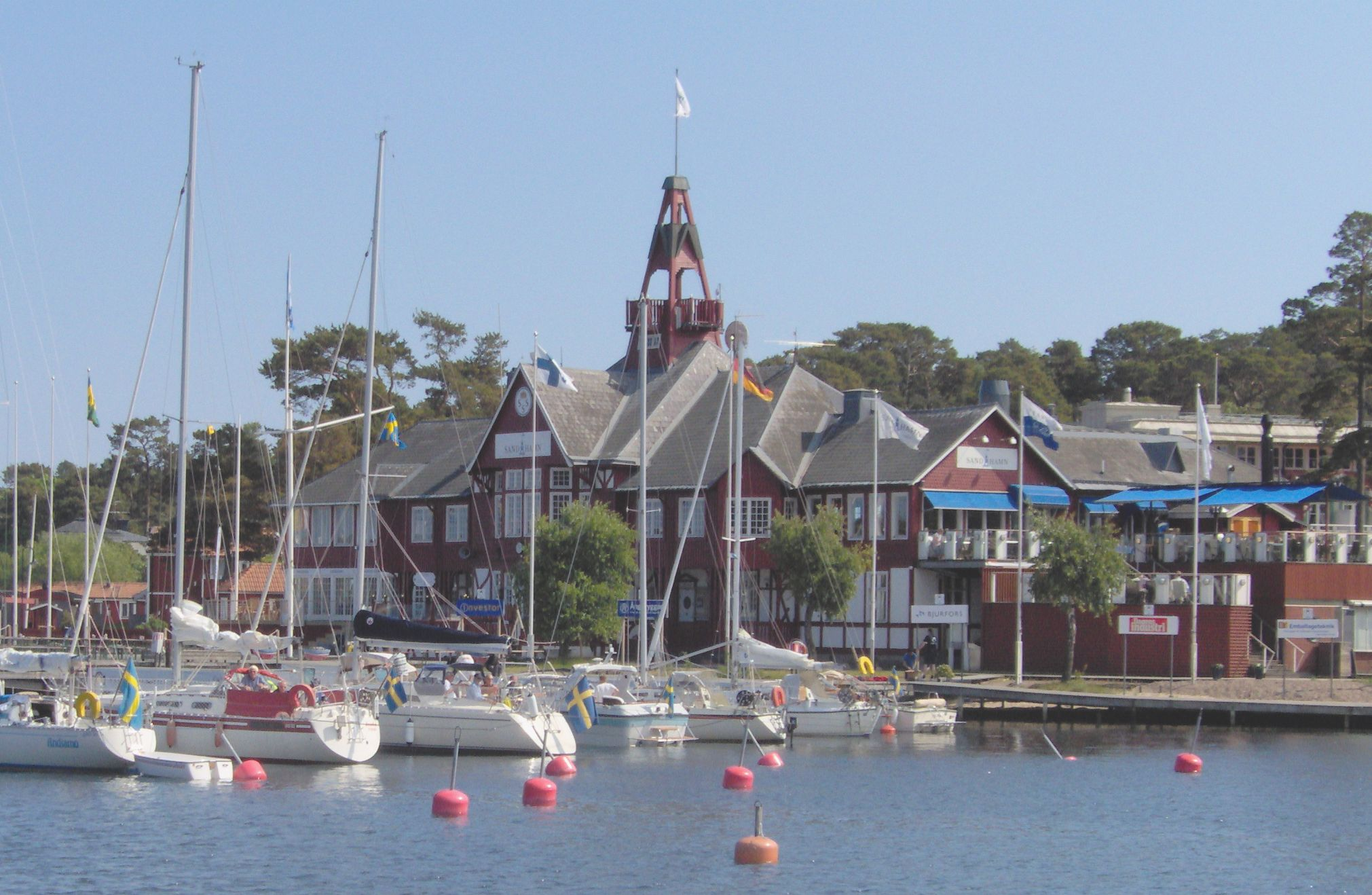

Event title
- Edition: 2
- Host: Kungliga Svenska Segelsallskapet (KSSK)

Event details
- Venue: Sandhamn, Sweden
- Yachts: 46

Competitors
- Competitors: 138
- Competing nations: 11

Results
- (gold) Gold: Sweden; Arved von Grünewaldt; Nomen nescio
- (silver) Silver: Sweden; H. Kellner; Nomen nescio
- (bronze) Bronze: West Germany; Eckart Wagner; Nomen nescio

Only the results of the top five boats were documented.

Rank	Country	Helmsman	Sail No.	Race 1		Race 2		Race 3		Race 4		Race 5		Race 6		Total	Total – discard
Rank	Country	Helmsman	Sail No.	Pos.	Pts.	Pos.	Pts.	Pos.	Pts.	Pos.	Pts.	Pos.	Pts.	Pos.	Pts.	Total	Total – discard
1st place, gold medalist(s)	SWE	Arved von Grünewaldt	S 21	8	14.0	2	3.0	1	0.0	5	10.0	5	10.0	~~12~~	~~18.0~~	55.0	37.0
2nd place, silver medalist(s)	SWE	H. Keller	S 27	11	17.0	6	11.7	2	3.0	3	5.7	1	0.0	~~15~~	~~21.0~~	58.4	37.4
3rd place, bronze medalist(s)	FRG	Eckart Wagner	G 24	~~24~~	~~30.0~~	8	14.0	4	8.0	4	8.0	4	8.0	1	0.0	68.0	38.0
4	SWE	Stig Wennerstrom	S 35	10	16.0	1	0.0	5	10.0	6	11.7	2	3.0	~~28~~	~~34.0~~	74.7	40.7
5	AUS	K. Winterbottom	KA 57	~~14~~	~~20.0~~	4	8.0	3	5.7	1	0.0	14	20.0	7	13.0	66.7	46.7

Legend: DNF – Did not finish; DNS – Did not start; DSQ – Disqualified;
Discard is crossed out and does not count for the overall result.

- 1969 Progress

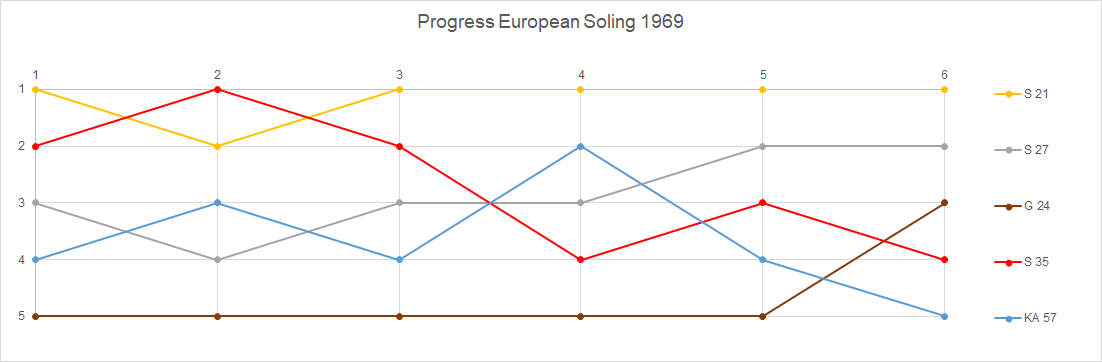

== 1970 Final results ==
1970
Event title
- Edition: 3

Event details
- Venue: Hankø, Norway

Results
- (gold) Gold: Denmark; Paul Elvstrøm; Niels Jensen; Poul Mik-Meyer
- (silver) Silver: Sweden; Arved von Grünewaldt; Tommy Nilsson; Anders Nordin
- (bronze) Bronze: Sweden; Pelle Petterson; Nomen nescio

No further results found yet!

- 1970 Progress

Not enough date to generate!

== 1971 Final results ==
1971
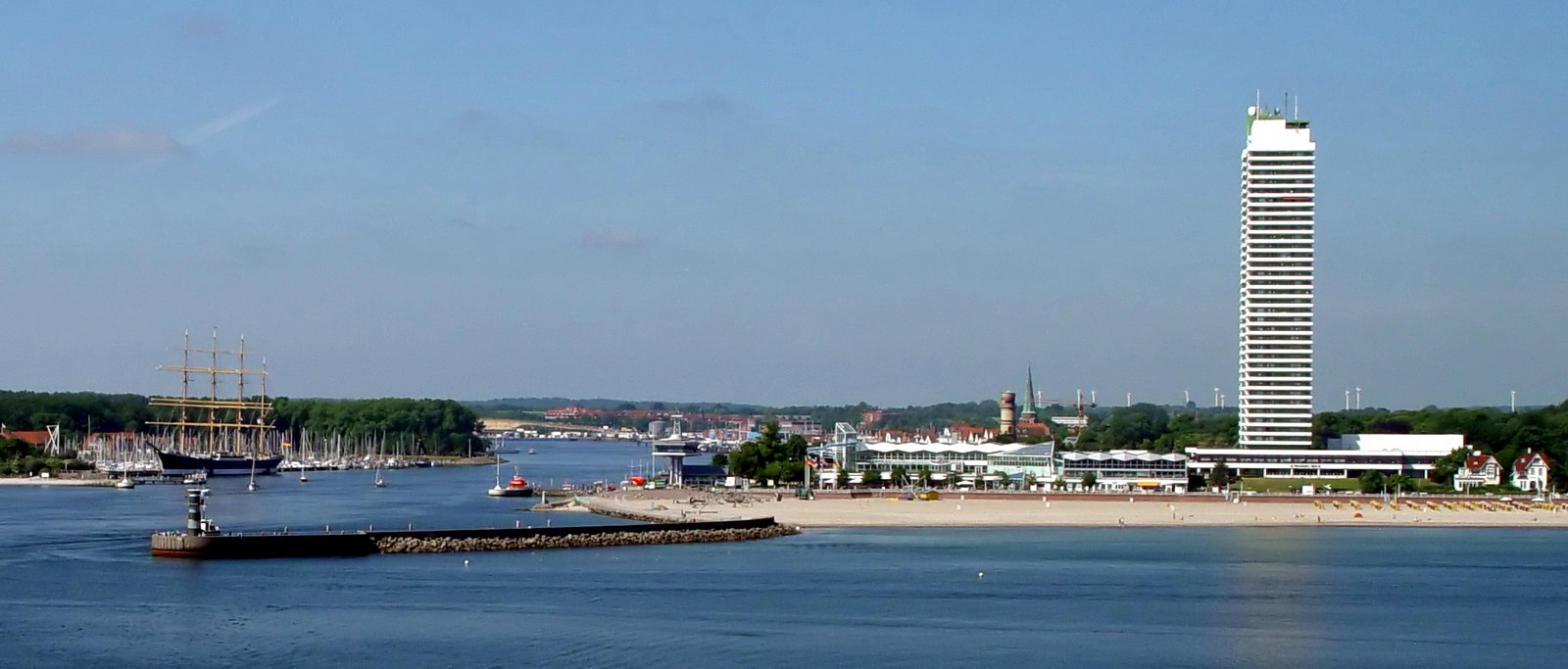

Event title
- Edition: 4

Event details
- Venue: Travemünde, West Germany

Results
- (gold) Gold: Denmark; Paul Elvstrøm; Niels Jensen; Valdemar Bandolowski
- (silver) Silver: Soviet Union; Timur Pinegin; Valentin Zamotaykin; Rais Galimov
- (bronze) Bronze: West Germany; Niels Bolt Jörgensen; Nomen nescio

No further results found yet!

- 1971 Progress

Not enough date to generate!

== 1972 Final results ==
1972
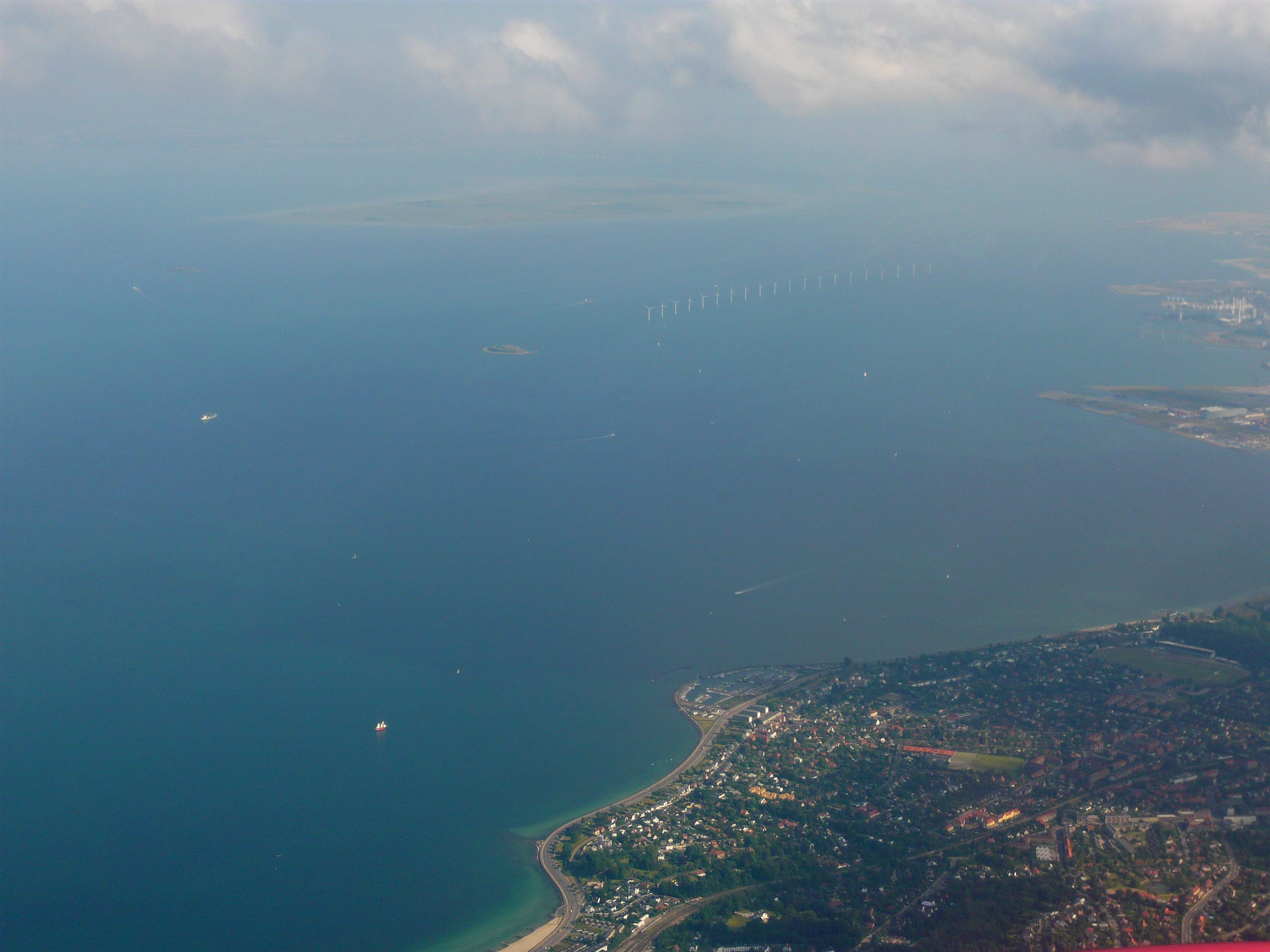

Event title
- Edition: 5
- Host: Kongelig Dansk Yachtklub (KDY)

Event details
- Venue: Skovshoved, Denmark
- Dates: 8–16 August
- Opening ceremony: 10 August

Results
- (gold) Gold: East Germany; Roland Schwarz; Lothar Köpsel; Werner Christoph
- (silver) Silver: United Kingdom; John Oakeley; Charles Reynolds; Barry Dunning
- (bronze) Bronze: Denmark; Paul Elvstrøm; Niels Jensen; Valdemar Bandolowski

No further results found yet!

- 1972 Progress

Not enough date to generate!

== 1973 Final results ==
1973
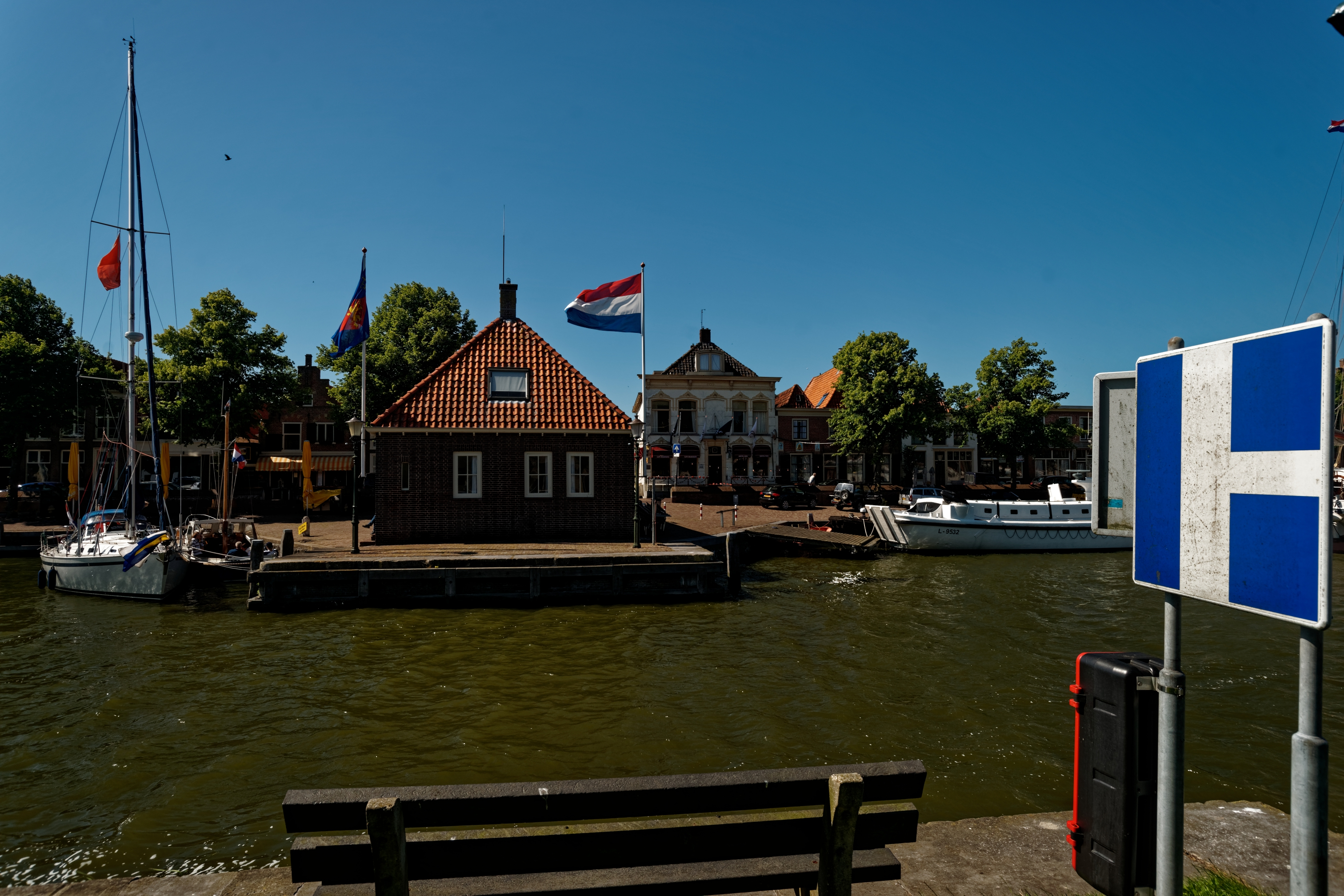

Event title
- Edition: 6
- Host: Koninklijke Zeil- en Roeivereniging Hollandia

Event details
- Venue: Medemblik, Netherlands
- Dates: 14–22 July
- Opening ceremony: 16 July

Results
- (gold) Gold: East Germany; Dieter Below; Olaf Engelhardt; Michael Zachries
- (silver) Silver: Austria; Uli Strohschneider; Nomen nescio
- (bronze) Bronze: East Germany; Roland Schwarz; Lothar Köpsel; Werner Christoph

No further results found yet!

- 1973 Progress

Not enough date to generate!

== 1974 Final results ==
1974
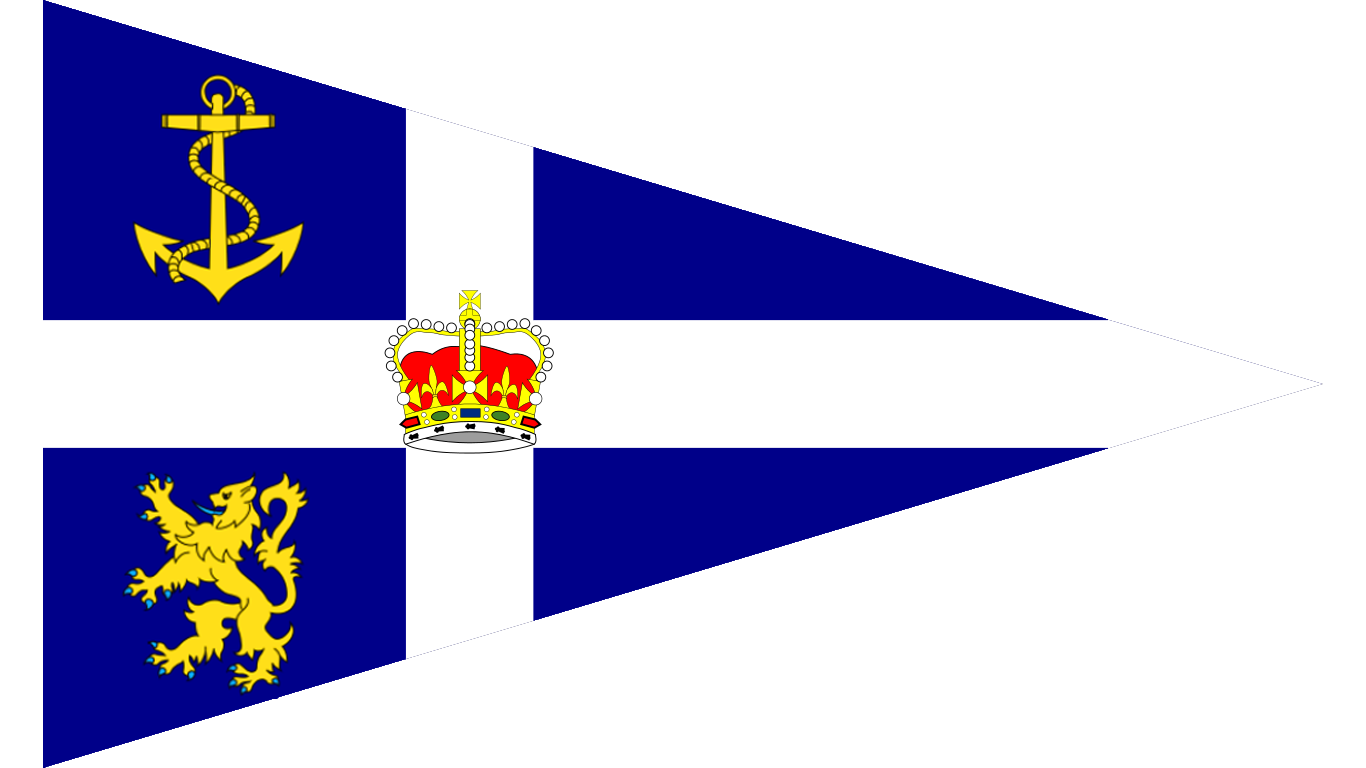

Event title
- Edition: 7
- Host: Royal Northern and Clyde Yacht Club

Event details
- Venue: Helensburgh, United Kingdom
- Dates: 1–8 September
- Yachts: 53
- Opening ceremony: 2 September

Competitors
- Competitors: 159

Results
- (gold) Gold: West Germany; Willi Kuhweide; Axel May; Karsten Meyer
- (silver) Silver: Denmark; Poul Richard Høj Jensen; Nomen nescio
- (bronze) Bronze: East Germany; Roland Schwarz; Lothar Köpsel; Werner Christoph

Only the top 6 and 10 ranking is documented.

Rank	Country	Helmsman	Crew	Sail No	Boat name	Total – discard
1st place, gold medalist(s)	FRG	Willi Kuhweide	Axel May; Karsten Meyer	G 135	Darling	23.0
2nd place, silver medalist(s)	DEN	Poul Richard Høj Jensen	Not documented	D 60	Bo-Bo	40.4
3rd place, bronze medalist(s)	GDR	Roland Schwarz	Lothar Köpsel; Werner Christoph		Optimist	69.0
4	GDR	Dieter Below	Olaf Engelhardt; Michael Zachries	GO 5	Rasmus	69.4
5	FRG	Erich Hirt	Not documented	G 139	Frechdachs	91.7
6	AUT	Uli Strohschneider	Not documented	OE 18	Baladin	93.4
10	GBR	Charles Ingham	Not documented	K 111	Chameleon Too	101.7

- 1974 Progress

Not enough date to generate!

== 1975 Final results ==
1975
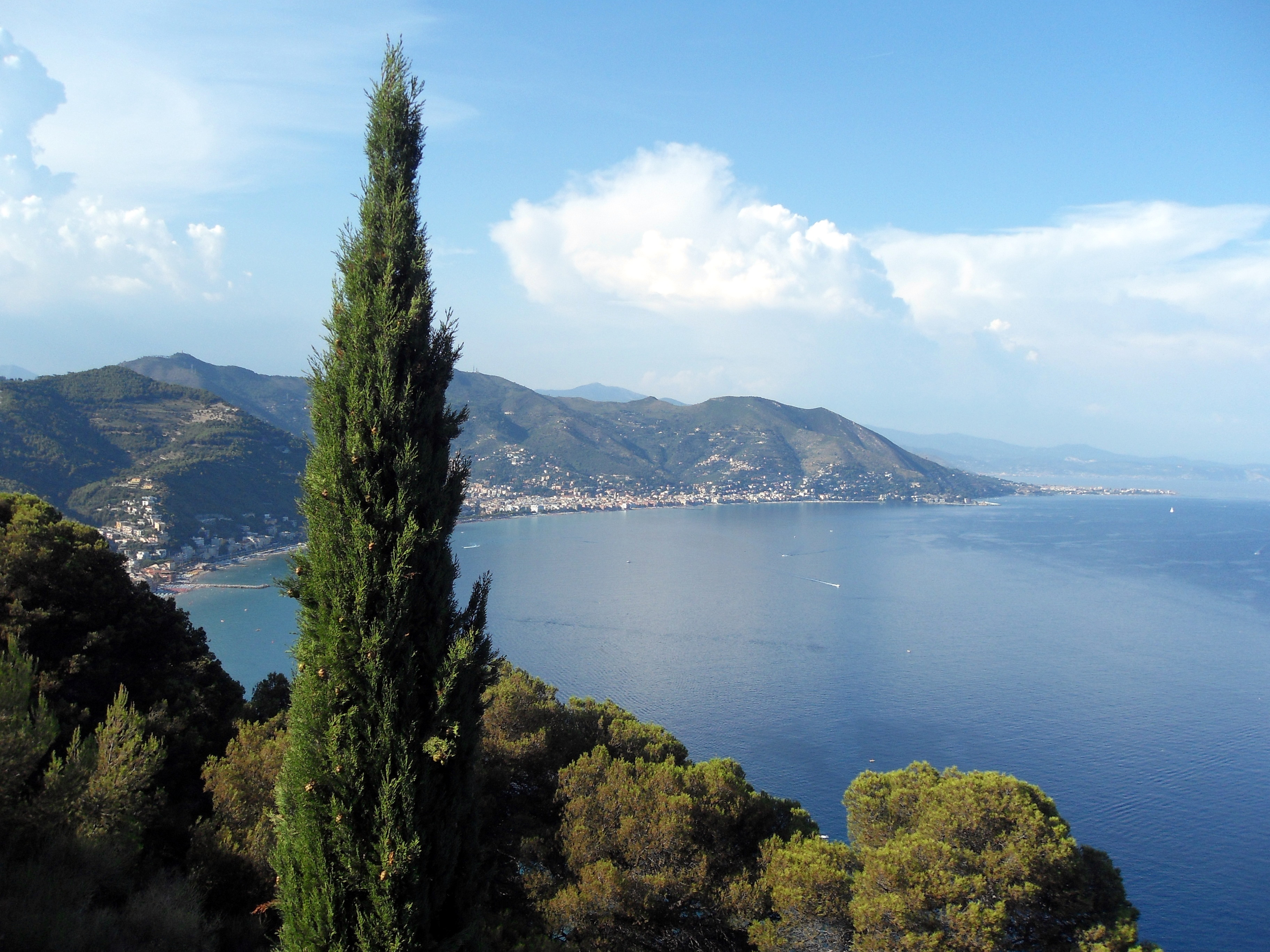

Event title
- Edition: 8
- Host: Il Circolo Nautico Al Mare di Alassio, CNAM

Event details
- Venue: Alassio, Italy
- Dates: 17–25 May
- Yachts: 62
- Opening ceremony: 19 May

Competitors
- Competitors: 186

Results
- (gold) Gold: Sweden; Stig Wennerström; Lennart Roslund; Stefan Krook
- (silver) Silver: East Germany; Roland Schwarz; Lothar Köpsel; Werner Christoph
- (bronze) Bronze: Italy; Fabio Albarelli; Leopoldo Di Martino; Guidotti

Only the top 20 ranking is documented.

Rank	Country	Helmsman	Crew	Sail No	Boat name	Total – discard
1st place, gold medalist(s)	SWE	Stig Wennerström	Lennart Roslund; Stefan Krook	S 111	Blott XVII	32.7
2nd place, silver medalist(s)	GDR	Roland Schwarz	Lothar Köpsel; Werner Christoph	GO 6	NN	49.4
3rd place, bronze medalist(s)	ITA	Fabio Albarelli	Leopoldo di Martino; Guidotti	I 164	Peler II	54.7
4	AUT	Hubert Raudaschl	Nomen nescio	OE 41	May Be	56.0
5	GDR	Dieter Below	Olaf Engelhardt; Michael Zachries	GO 5	Rasmus	60.0
6	FRG	Willi Kuhweide	Axel May; Karsten Meyer	G 155	Darling	62.7
7	FRG	Erich Hirt	Nomen nescio	G 139	Frechdachs	63.0
8	ITA	Scala	Nomen nescio	OE 18	Canaco	71.7
9	DEN	Valdemar Bandolowski	Nomen nescio	D 66	NN	86.7
10	ITA	Coccoloni	Nomen nescio	I 145	Finco III	92.0
11	DEN	Poul Richard Høj Jensen	Nomen nescio	D 65	Bobo	93.7
12	ITA	Luigi Croce	E. Enrico; Nomen nescio	I 152	Simone Boccanegra	124.0
13	FRG	Achim Kadelbach	Nomen nescio	G 116	Scampex	125.0
14	AUT	Uli Strohschneider	Nomen nescio	OE 48	Baladin	127.7
15	FRA	Bertrand Cheret	Nomen nescio	F 121	NN	128.0
16	GBR	Charled Ingham	Nomen nescio	K 111	Chameleon Too	128.0
17	NED	Heiki Blok	Nomen nescio	H 14	Brave Hendrik VII	137.0
18	SUI	Edwin Bernet	Nomen nescio	Z 161	Mistere	147.0
19	NED	Rien Rozendaal	Nomen nescio	H 15	Bojo	148.0
20	GBR	E. Simonds	Nomen nescio	K 115	Pandemonium III	153.0

- 1975 Progress

Not enough date to generate!

== 1976 Final results ==
1976
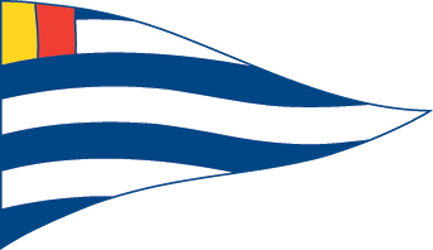

Event title
- Edition: 9
- Host: Société Nautique de Genève

Event details
- Venue: Geneva, Switzerland
- Dates: 28 April - 8 May
- Yachts: 54
- Key people: ● Gerard Devaud Switzerland President of the organizing committee ● Alan Elmassian Switzerland Race Officer ● Eric Cake United Kingdom Chairman of the Jury
- Opening ceremony: 30 April

Competitors
- Competitors: 162
- Competing nations: 18

Results
- (gold) Gold: East Germany; Dieter Below; Olaf Engelhardt; Michael Zachries
- (silver) Silver: Denmark; Poul Richard Høj Jensen; Valdemar Bandolowski; Erik Hermann Hansen
- (bronze) Bronze: Austria; Herbert Raudaschl; Walter Raudaschl; Rudi Mayer

No further results details documented.

Rank	Country	Helmsman	Crew	Sail No	Boat name	Total – discard
1st place, gold medalist(s)	GDR	Dieter Below	Olaf Engelhardt; Michael Zachries	GO 5	Rasmus	37.7
2nd place, silver medalist(s)	DEN	Poul Richard Høj Jensen	Valdemar Bandolowski; Erik Hermann Hansen	D 67	Bobo	52.7
3rd place, bronze medalist(s)	AUT	Hubert Raudaschl	Walter Raudaschl; Rudi Mayer	OE 51	May Be	59.0
4	GDR	Roland Schwarz	Lothar Köpsel; Werner Christoph	GO 6	Optimist	60.0
5	URS	Boris Budnikov	Nomen nescio	SR 16	Olen	60.0
6	SWE	Jörgen Sundelin	Peter Sundelin; Ulf Sundelin	S 105	Debutant	61.7
7	FRA	Bertrand Cheret	Nomen nescio	F 131	Partos	100.7
8	NED	Geert Bakker	Nomen nescio	H 17	Cadans	109.0
9	FRG	Fritz Geis	Werde; Meyer	G 152	Lady for Three	113.0
10	GBR	John Oakeley	Nomen nescio	K 123	Go	114.4
11	SUI	A. Caronica	Nomen nescio	Z 190	Onac III	127.0
12	FIN	Kai Wagello	Nomen nescio	L 31	Nordic VII	128.7
13	SUI	Edwin Bernet	Nomen nescio	Z 211	Mystere	131.7
14	ITA	Fabio Albarelli	Nomen nescio	I 154	Peler	133.0
15	AUT	Uli Strohschneider	Nomen nescio	OE 58	Baladin	134.7
16	FIN	Matti Jokinen	M. Paloheimo; Nomen nescio	L 35	Finnmaid	138.7
17	BRA	Augusto Barroso	Nomen nescio	BL 20	Feitico V	142.0
18	FIN	Sam Hartikainen	Nomen nescio	L 37	TWink	142.0
19	NED	Heiki Blok	Nomen nescio	H 18	Brave Hendrik VIII	144.0
20	FRG	Max Koch	Nomen nescio	G 145	Mauzi	144.0
21	SUI	A. Lanz	Nomen nescio	Z 208	Rafti	153.0
22	FRG	Erich Hirt	Nomen nescio	G 139	Frechs Dachs	154.7
23	FIN	Kurt Nyman	Nomen nescio	L 38	May Be	162.7
24	CAN	Glen Dexter	Andreas Josenhans; Sandy MacMillan	KC 122	Tycups II	163.0
25	SWE	Stig Wennerstrom	Nomen nescio	S 111	Blott XVII	165.7
26	MON	Gérard Battaglia	Jean-Pierre Borro; Claude Rossi	MO 1	Artea II	169.0
27	FRG	Heiner Hedike	Nomen nescio	G 154	Traum VII	171.0
28	GBR	Charles Ingham	Nomen nescio	K 111	Chameleon Two	185.0
29	GBR}	Watson	Cochrane; Woolard	K 113	Bullet II	187.0
30	FRA	Henri Samuel	Nomen nescio	F 127	Galaxie	188.0
31	SUI	A. Schürch	Nomen nescio	Z 203	Hokai	189.0
32	GRE	George Andreadis	Nomen nescio	GR 24	Okeanis III	194.0
33	BRA	Eduardo de Souza	Nomen nescio	BL 33	Krishna	198.0
34	SUI	R. Bourquin	Nomen nescio	Z 120	Pabo	202.0
35	FRA	René Sence	Nomen nescio	F 134	Christe	205.0
36	SUI	R. Guigrard	Nomen nescio	Z 176	Gavroche IV	211.0
37	GBR	E.S. Ford	Nomen nescio	K 118	Romance	213.0
38	FRG	Rainer Niemann	Nomen nescio	G 95	Sauzahn	227.0
39	SUI	U. Colombi	Nomen nescio	Z 171	Salty Tiger	227.7
40	SUI	J. Christen	Nomen nescio	Z 173	Nadia	232.0
41	FRG	Hans Peter Berkes	Nomen nescio	G 168	Blauer Peter	236.0
42	FRG	Alfred Niermann	Nomen nescio	G 127	Weizenbock	246.0
43	GRE	Nomen nescio	Nomen nescio	GR 16	Arctouros III	274.0
44	BEL	W. Haverhals	Nomen nescio	B 9	Blue Girl III	277.0
45	ITA	Nomen nescio	Nomen nescio	I 109	Franca II	286.0
46	SUI	A. Amherd	Nomen nescio	Z 210	Viola	290.0
47	AUT	Helmuth Reischer	Nomen nescio	OE 50	Shangri-La	293.0
48	SUI	R. Martin-Du-Pan	Nomen nescio	Z 146	Soukha	293.0
49	ITA	Stefano Rossari	Nomen nescio	I 141	Lerone	295.0
50	ITA	Negri	Baldioli; Nomen nescio	I 89	Snoopy II	298.0
51	FIN	Vladimir Marchan	Baldioli; Nomen nescio	L 40	Carmen	298.0
52	SUI	Peter Mischler	Nomen nescio	Z 188	Challenger	299.0
53	FRA	Bonacorsi	Nomen nescio	F 107	Raf	322.0
54	YUG	David Antocic	Nomen nescio	Y 1	Arius	332.0

- 1976 Progress

Not enough date to generate!

== 1977 Final results ==
1977
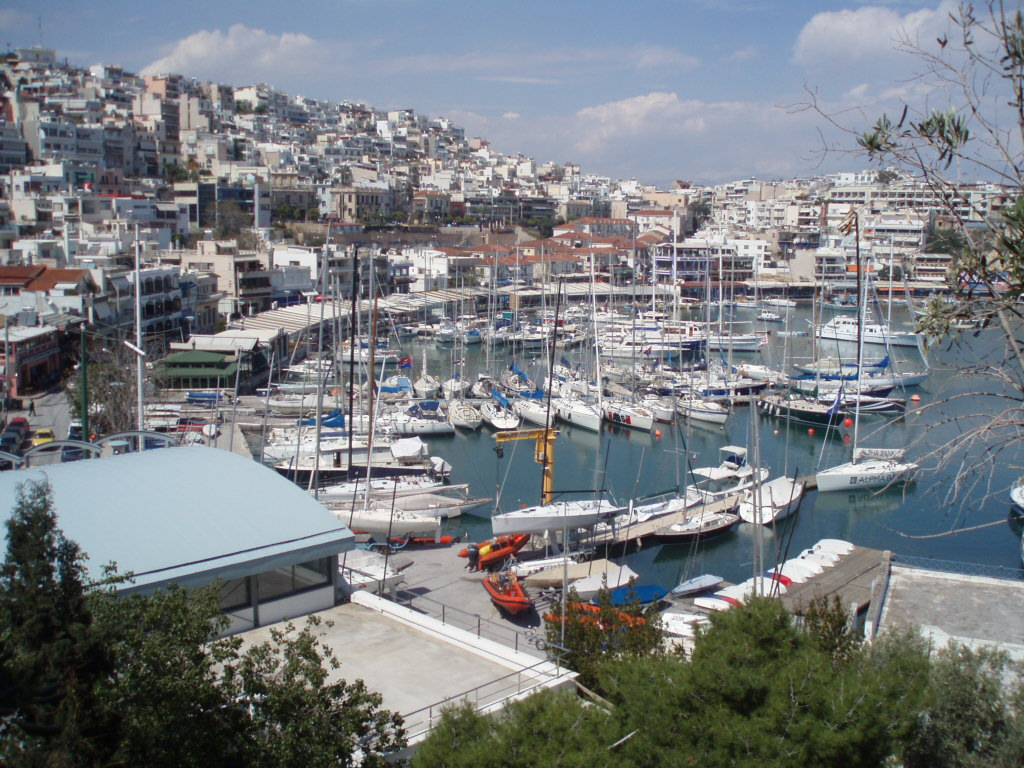

Event title
- Edition: 10
- Host: Yacht Club of Greece

Event details
- Venue: Piraeus, Greece
- Dates: 26 August - 6 September
- Opening ceremony: 30 August

Results
- (gold) Gold: West Germany; Fritz Geis; Gerhard Fehzner; Andreas Bock
- (silver) Silver: West Germany; Willi Kuhweide; Axel May; Karsten Meyer
- (bronze) Bronze: Denmark; Valdemar Bandolowski; Nomen nescio

Only the ranking results of the first 10 teams are documented.

Rank	Country	Helmsman	Crew	Sail No	Total – discard
1st place, gold medalist(s)	FRG	Fritz Geis	Gerhard Fehzner; Andreas Bock	G 192	40.7
2nd place, silver medalist(s)	FRG	Willi Kuhweide	Axel May; Karsten Meyer	G 185	42.7
3rd place, bronze medalist(s)	DEN	Valdemar Bandolowski	Nomen nescio	D 73	46.1
4	SWE	Stig Wennerstrom	Nomen nescio	GO 6	63.7
5	URS	Boris Budnikov	Nomen nescio	SR 16	68.0
6	FRA	Patrick Haegeli	Nomen nescio	F 132	78.4
7	SUI	Edwin Bernet	Nomen nescio	Z 211	99.0
8	AUT	Uli Strohschneider	Nomen nescio	OE 58	100.0
9	SWE	Arved von Gruenewaldt	Nomen nescio	S 83	101.0
10	FRG	Karl Haist	Nomen nescio	G 178	105.7

- 1977 Progress

Not enough date to generate!

== 1978 Final results ==
1978
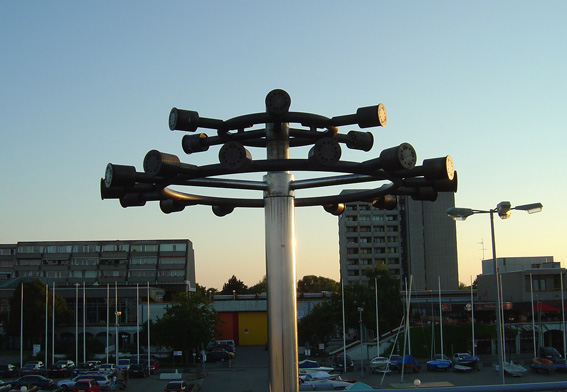

Event title
- Edition: 11
- Host: Kieler Yacht-Club

Event details
- Venue: Kiel, West Germany
- Dates: 2–9 July
- Opening ceremony: 4 July

Results
- (gold) Gold: Canada; Hans Fogh; John Kerr; Dennis Toews
- (silver) Silver: Canada; Glenn Dexter; Andreas Josenhans; Sandy MacMillan
- (bronze) Bronze: East Germany; Dieter Below; Olaf Engelhardt; Michael Zachries

Race 2 on July 4 was abandoned due to winds over 60 knots and windshift of 60 degrees on the last reach. Only 22 teams out of 73 entries were able to finish. Four boats sunk some probably by infringements of the class rules. Only two of them could be recovered. Due to the weather conditions the planned races were sailed in the following sequence:

- 4 July Race 1
- 7 July Race 2 + 5
- 8 July Race 3 + 6
- 9 July Race 4 + 7

=== Daily results ===
Rank	1	2	3	4	5
Race 1:	Canada Hans Fogh	Sweden Jörgen Sundelin	Sweden Stig Wennerstrom	West Germany Fritz Geis	Denmark Poul Richard Høj Jensen
Race 2:	Canada Hans Fogh	Canada Peter Hall	Netherlands Geert Bakker	Denmark Valdemar Bandolowski	Soviet Union Boris Budnikov
Race 3:	Canada Glen Dexter	Canada Bill Abbott Jr.	East Germany Dieter Below	Soviet Union Boris Budnikov	West Germany Willi Kuhweide
Race 4:	West Germany Fritz Geis	Sweden Stig Wennerstrom	Greece George Andreadis	Canada Bill Abbott Jr.	France Patrick Haegeli
Race 5:	East Germany Dieter Below	Brazil Eduardo de Souza	Austria Carl Auteried	Canada Hans Fogh	Canada Bill Abbott Jr.
Race 6:	West Germany Willi Kuhweide	Soviet Union Boris Budnikov	Denmark Poul Richard Høj Jensen	East Germany Dieter Below	Canada Hans Fogh
Race 7:	Soviet Union Boris Budnikov	United Kingdom Philip Crebbin	West Germany Erich Hirt	Canada Glen Dexter	Brazil Eduardo Ramos

=== Overall results ===
Rank	Country	Helmsman	Crew
1st place, gold medalist(s)	CAN	Hans Fogh	John Kerr; Dennis Toews
2nd place, silver medalist(s)	CAN	Glenn Dexter	Andreas Josenhans; Sandy MacMillan
3rd place, bronze medalist(s)	GDR	Dieter Below	Olaf Engelhardt; Michael Zachries
4	URS	Boris Budnikov	Nomen nescio
5	CAN	Bill Abbott Jr.	Nomen nescio
6	Nomen nescio	Nomen nescio	Nomen nescio
7	SWE	Stig Wennerstrom	Nomen nescio
8	Nomen nescio	Nomen nescio	Nomen nescio
9	Nomen nescio	Nomen nescio	Nomen nescio
10	CAN	Peter Hall	Nomen nescio

- 1978 Progress

Not enough date to generate!

== 1979 Final results ==
1979
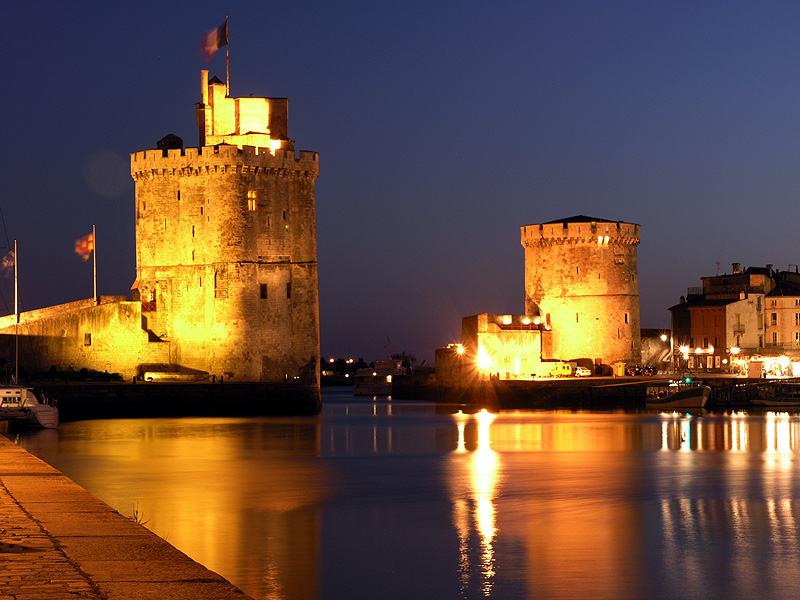

Event title
- Edition: 12

Event details
- Venue: La Rochelle, France
- Dates: 26 August - 2 September
- Yachts: 129
- Opening ceremony: 27 August

Competitors
- Competitors: 43
- Competing nations: 14

Results
- (gold) Gold: Brazil; Eduardo Ramos; Manfred Kaufman; Thomas Heiman
- (silver) Silver: Netherlands; Geert Bakker; Pieter Keijzer; Harald de Vlaming
- (bronze) Bronze: Sweden; Arved von Grünewaltdt; Tommy Nilsson; Anders Nordin

Only the ranking of the top ten boats were documented.

Rank	Country	Helmsman	Crew
1st place, gold medalist(s)	BRA	Eduardo Ramos	Manfred Kaufman; Thomas Heiman
2nd place, silver medalist(s)	NED	Geert Bakker	Pieter Keijzer; Harald de Vlaming
3rd place, bronze medalist(s)	SWE	Arved von Grünewaltdt	Tommy Nilsson; Anders Nordin
4	ITA	Dotti	Nomen nescio
5	FRA	Bertrand Cheret	Nomen nescio
6	GBR	Colin Simonds	Nomen nescio
7	SUI	Jean-François Corminboeuf	Nomen nescio
8	ITA	Barozzo	Nomen nescio
9	FRA	Serge Maury	Nomen nescio
10	FRG	Fritz Geis	Nomen nescio

- 1979 Progress

Not enough date to generate!

== Further results ==
For further results see:

- Soling European Championship results (1968–1979)
- Soling European Championship results (1980–1984)
- Soling European Championship results (1985–1989)
- Soling European Championship results (1990–1994)
- Soling European Championship results (1995–1999)
- Soling European Championship results (2000–2004)
- Soling European Championship results (2005–2009)
- Soling European Championship results (2010–2014)
- Soling European Championship results (2015–2019)
- Soling European Championship results (2020–2024)
