= Soling European Championship =

International sailing regatta

Soling
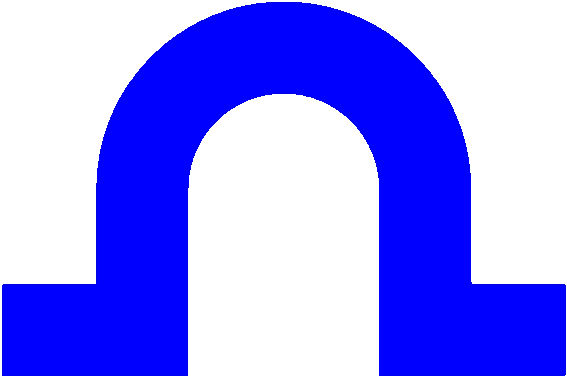
- Class insigna

Development
- Name: Soling

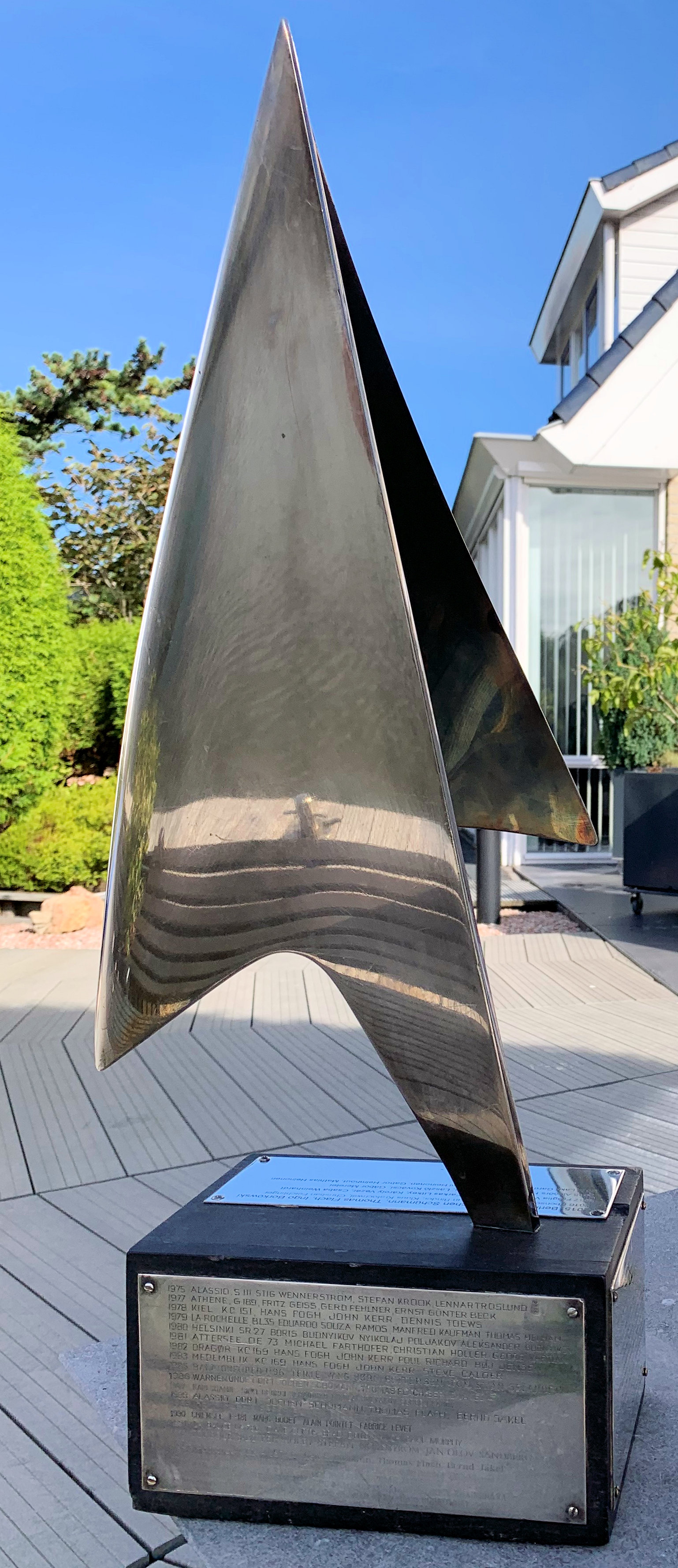
The European Championship Perpetual Trophy, THE SOLING CUP, has been donated by the Royal Danish Yacht Club with the intention of bringing together as many competitors of different nationalities as possible for yacht racing in a friendly spirit is one of the two perpetual trophies for the winning team of the Soling European Championship.

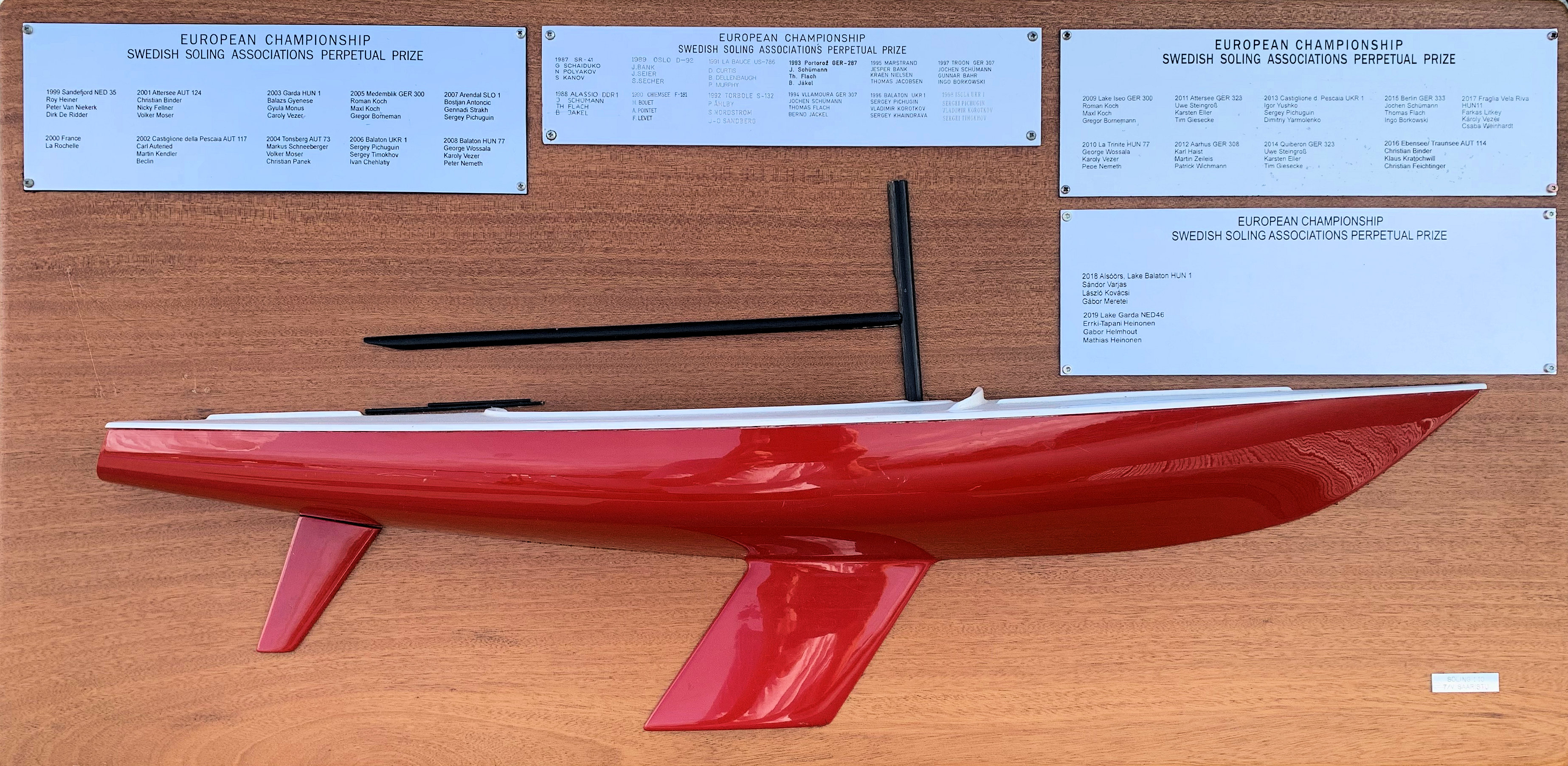
The Swedish Soling Association’s Perpetual Prize in 1987 made and donated by Valter Saaristu to the winner of the European Championship is the other perpetual trophy for the winning team of the Soling European Championship. Winners engraved on the back board.

The Soling European Championship is an International sailing regatta in the Soling organized by the International Soling Association under auspiciën of World Sailing. Over 50 Soling European Championship were held. The popularity grew during the Olympic period of the Soling. After that era the event continued and is still reasonable successful. The Soling European Championship is an "Open" event. This means that competitors from all over the world are eligible to enter.

During the Olympic era of the Soling (1969 - 2000) the European Championships were a primary selection event for the NOC's to determine their Olympic delegation in the class.

== Editions ==
#	Year	City	Country	Dates	Boats	Athletes	Nations	Note/ Reference
1	1968	Skovshoved	Denmark	15–22 July	25	75	?	
2	1969	Sandhamn	Sweden		46	138	11	
3	1970	Hankø	Norway	15–22 July				
4	1971	Travemünde	West Germany	8–16 August				
5	1972	Skovshoved	Denmark	8–16 August				
6	1973	Medemblik	Netherlands	14–22 July				
7	1974	Helensburgh	United Kingdom	1–8 September	53	159		
8	1975	Alassio	Italy	17–25 May	62	168		
9	1976	Geneva	Switzerland	28 April – 8 May	54	162		
10	1977	Piraeus	Greece	26 August – 6 September				
11	1978	Kiel	West Germany	2–9 July	73	219		
12	1979	La Rochelle	France	26 August – 2 September	43	129	14	
13	1980	Helsinki	Finland	4–13 June	40	120	13	
14	1981	Attersee	Austria	30 August – 6 September	43	129	13	
15	1982	Dragør	Denmark	11–19 September	51	153	13	
16	1983	Medemblik	Netherlands	2–10 September	50	150	17	
17	1984	Not held due to Olympic Games						
18	1985	Balatonfüred	Hungary	17–27 May	53	159	16	
19	1986	Warnemünde	East Germany	4–13 July	47	141	16	
20	1987	Karlshamn	Sweden	28 August – 6 September	51	153	18	
21	1988	Alassio	Italy	8–14 May	63	189	20	
22	1989	Oslo	Norway	1–9 September	48	144	17	
23	1990	Prien am Chiemsee	West Germany	30 April – 6 May	69	207	19	
24	1991	La Baule	France	30 May – 9 June	83	249	20	
25	1992	Lake Garda	Italy	17–26 September	45	235	14	
26	1993	Portorož	Slovenia	5–12 June	39	117	13	
27	1994	Vilamoura	Portugal	17–23 September	32	96	16	
28	1995	Marstrand	Sweden	12–18 June	56	168	21	
29	1996	Lake Balaton	Hungary	19–27 September	31	93	12	
30	1997	Troon	United Kingdom	6–12 September	37	111	13	
31	1998	Izola	Slovenia	4–11 July 1998	51	153	17	
32	1999	Sandefjord	Norway	25–31 July	47	141	19	
33	2000	La Rochelle	France	11–17 June	27	81	14	
34	2001	Attersee	Austria	1–8 September	31	93	10	
35	2002	Castiglione della Pescaia	Italy	27 May – 1 June	32	96	10	
36	2003	Nago–Torbole	Italy	31 August - 4 September	24	72	10	
37	2004	Tønsberg	Norway	2–8 August	20	60	9	
38	2005	Medemblik	Netherlands	7–12 August	20	60	7	
39	2006	Balatonfüred	Hungary	13–19 May	25	75	12	
40	2007	Arendal	Norway	28 July – 3 August	52	156	14	
41	2008	Balatonfured	Hungary	20–27 April	19	57	10	
42	2009	Lovere	Italy	31 July – 8 August	36	108	10	
43	2010	La Trinité-sur-Mer	France	28 August – 4 September	25	75	11	
44	2011	Attersee	Austria	27 August – 4 September	32	96	10	
45	2012	Aarhus	Denmark	9–15 June	33	99	12	
46	2013	Castiglione della Pescaia	Italy	28 March – 3 April	21	63	10	
47	2014	Quiberon	France	14–19 June	16	48	12	
48	2015	Berlin	Germany	13–19 September	27	84	6	
49	2016	Ebensee	Austria	2–5 May	35	105	11	
50	2017	Riva del Garda	Italy	13–16 June	37	111	11	
51	2018	Alsóörs	Hungary	1–5 May	22	66	09	
52	2019	Torbole	Italy	25–29 June	32	96	11	
53	2020	Warnemunde	Germany	16-21 June	Not held due to COVID-19			
54	2021	Santander, Spain	Spain		Rescheduled and relocated due to COVID-19			
54	2021	Mandello del Lario	Italy	30 September – 3 October	25	75	9	,
55	2022	Attersee (lake)	Austria	29 August - 3 September	31	93	10	
56	2023	Warnemunde	Germany					

== Medalists ==
Year	Gold	Silver	Bronze
1968; Denmark; Skovshoved	Norway; Per Spilling; Jim Mc Elvin; Dag Blomdal	Netherlands; Geert Bakker; Crew not documented	Denmark; Niels Bolt Jörgensen; Crew not documented
1969; Sweden; Sandhamn	Sweden; Arved von Grünewaldt; Tommy Nilsson; Anders Nordin	Sweden; H. Kellner; Crew not documented	West Germany; Norbert Wagner; Crew not documented
1970; Norway; Hankø	Denmark; Paul Elvstrøm; Poul Mik-Meyer; Jan Kjærulff	Sweden; Arved von Grünewaldt; Tommy Nilsson; Anders Nordin	Sweden; Pelle Petterson; Crew not documented
1971; West Germany; Travemünde	Denmark; Paul Elvstrøm; Flemming Jensen; Valdemar Bandolowski	Soviet Union; Timur Pinegin; Valentin Zamotaykin; Rais Galimov	Denmark; Niels Bolt Jörgensen; Crew not documented
1972; Denmark; Skovshoved	East Germany; Roland Schwarz; Lothar Köpsel; Werner Christoph	United Kingdom; John Oakeley; Charles Reynolds; Barry Dunning	Denmark; Paul Elvstrøm; Niels Jensen; Valdemar Bandolowski
1973; Netherlands; Medemblik	East Germany; Dieter Below; Michael Zachries; Olaf Engelhardt	Austria; Uli Strohschneider; Crew not documented	East Germany; Roland Schwarz; Lothar Köpsel; Werner Christoph
1974; United Kingdom; Firth of Clyde	West Germany; Willi Kuhweide; Karsten Meyer; Axel May	Denmark; Poul Richard Høj Jensen; Crew not documented	East Germany; Roland Schwarz; Lothar Köpsel; Werner Christoph
1975; Italy; Alassio	Sweden; Stig Wennerström; Stefan Krook; Lennart Roslund	East Germany; Roland Schwarz; Lothar Köpsel; Werner Christoph	Italy; Fabio Albarelli; Leopoldo di Martino; Guidotti
1976; Switzerland; Geneva	East Germany; Dieter Below; Michael Zachries; Olaf Engelhardt	Denmark; Poul Richard Høj Jensen; Valdemar Bandolowski; Erik Hermann Hansen	Austria; Herbert Raudaschl; Walter Raudaschl; Rudi Mayer
1977; Greece; Piraeus	West Germany; Fritz Geis; Gerhard Fehlner; Ernst Günter Beck	West Germany; Willi Kuhweide; Axel May; Karsten Meyer	Denmark; Valdemar Bandolowski; Crew not documented
1978; West Germany; Kiel	Canada; Hans Fogh; John Kerr; Dennis Toews	Canada; Glenn Dexter; Andreas Josenhans; Sandy McMillan	East Germany; Dieter Below; Olaf Engelhardt; Michael Zachries
1979; France; La Rochelle	Brazil; Eduardo de Souza; Manfred Kaufman; Thomas Heiman	Netherlands; Geert Bakker; Pieter Keijzer; Harald de Vlaming	Sweden; Arved von Grünewaltdt; Tommy Nilsson; Anders Nordin
1980; Finland; Helsinki	Soviet Union; Boris Budnikov; Nikolay Polyakov; Aleksandr Budnikov	West Germany; Willi Kuhweide; Eckart Loell; Sebastian Ziegelmayer	Denmark; Poul Richard Høj Jensen; Valdemar Bandolowski; Erik Hermann Hansen
1981; Austria; Attersee (lake)	Austria; Michael Farthofer; Christian Holler; Georg Vartian	East Germany; Jörg Hermann; B. Becker; O. Olbrich	West Germany; Fritz Geis; Richard Fricke; Karl Fricke
1982; Denmark; Dragør	Canada; Hans Fogh; John Kerr; Poul Richard Høj Jensen	Soviet Union; Boris Budnikov; Aleksandr Budnikov; Nikolay Polyakov	Soviet Union; Eugenij Kudriavtsev; Crew not documented
1983; Netherlands; Medemblik	Canada; Hans Fogh; John Kerr (sailor); Steve Calder	Soviet Union; Boris Budnikov; Gennadi Strakh; Oleg Miron	East Germany; Helmar Nauck; Norbert Hellriegel; Sven Diedering
1984	Not held due to Olympic Games		
1985; Hungary; Balatonfüred	Norway; Terje Wang; Jørn Petterson; Tom Stian Selander	East Germany; Jochen Schümann; Thomas Flach; Bernd Jäkel	Soviet Union; Georgy Shayduko; Sergej Kanov; Nikolay Polyakov
1986; East Germany; Warnemünde	East Germany; Jochen Schümann; Thomas Flach; Bernd Jäkel	Sweden; Lennart Persson; Eje Öberg; Tony Wallin	Germany; Thomas Jungblut; Thomas Maschkiwitz; Tim Kröger
1987; Sweden; Karlshamn	Soviet Union; Georgy Shayduko; Sergej Kanov; Nikolay Polyakov	East Germany; Jochen Schümann; Thomas Flach; Bernd Jäkel	Canada; Hans Fogh; Steve Calder; Hank Lammens
1988; Italy; Alassio	East Germany; Jochen Schümann; Thomas Flach; Bernd Jäkel	United States; John Kostecki; William Baylis; Bob Billingham	Denmark; Jesper Bank; Jan Mathiassen; Steen Secher
1989; Norway; Oslo	Denmark; Jesper Bank; Jesper Seier; Steen Secher	Soviet Union; Sergey Pichuguin; Gennadi Strakh; Andrei Nikandrov	East Germany; Jochen Schümann; Thomas Flach; Bernd Jäkel
1990; Germany; Prien am Chiemsee	France; Marc Bouet; Alain Pointet; Fabrice Levet	East Germany; Jochen Schümann; Thomas Flach; Bernd Jäkel	Netherlands; Roy Heiner; Ed van der Steene; Yska Minks
1991; France; La Baule	United States; Dave Curtis; Brad Dellenbaugh; Paul Murphy	Sweden; Magnus Holmberg; Björn Alm; Johan Barne	East Germany; Jochen Schümann; Thomas Flach; Bernd Jäkel
1992; Italy; Torbole	Sweden; Per Åhlby; Stefan Nordström; Jan-Olov Sandberg	Austria; Michael Luschan; Stefan Lindner; Georg Stadler	Sweden; Magnus Holmberg; Björn Alm; Johan Barne
1993; Slovenia; Portorose	Germany; Jochen Schümann; Thomas Flach; Bernd Jäkel	Germany; Albert Batzill; Peter Lang; Eddy Eich	Norway; Rune Jacobsen; Erling Landsværk; Thom Haaland
1994; Portugal; Vilamoura	Germany; Jochen Schümann; Thomas Flach; Bernd Jäkel	Denmark; Stig Westergaard; Jens Bojsen-Møller; Bjørn Westergaard	Australia; Ian Walker; Michael Peel; Stephan Jackson
1995; Sweden; Marstrand	Denmark; Jesper Bank; Kræn Nielsen; Thomas Jacobsen	Norway; Herman Horn Johannessen; Paul Davis; Espen Stokkeland	Australia; Cameron Miles; James Mayjor; Chris Links
1996; Hungary; Balatonfüred	Ukraine; Serhiy Pichuhin; Serhiy Khaindrava; Volodymyr Korotkov	Austria; Christian Binder; Franz Fellner; Volker Moser	Hungary; György Wossala; László Kovácsi; Károly Vezér
1997; United Kingdom; Troon	Germany; Jochen Schümann; Gunnar Bahr; Ingo Borkowski	Great Britain; Andy Beadsworth; Barry Parkin; Mason	Norway; Herman Horn Johannessen; Paul Davis; Espen Stokkeland
1998; Slovenia; Izola	Ukraine; Serhiy Pichuhin; Volodymyr Korotkov; Serhiy Timokhov	Russia; Georgy Shayduko; Sergey Voltshkov; S. Kramskoy	Germany; Jochen Schümann; Gunnar Bahr; Ingo Borkowski
1999; Sweden; Sandefjord	Netherlands; Roy Heiner; Peter Van Niekerk; Dirk de Ridder	Ukraine; Serhiy Pichuhin; Volodymyr Korotkov; Serhiy Timokhov	Germany; Jochen Schümann; Gunnar Bahr; Ingo Borkowski
2000; France; La Rochelle	Denmark; Jesper Bank; Henrik Blakskjær; Thomas Jacobsen	Russia; Georgy Shayduko; Oleg Khopyorsky; Andrey Kirilyuk	Ukraine; Serhiy Pichuhin; Volodymyr Korotkov; Serhiy Timokhov
2001; Austria; Attersee (lake)	Austria; Christian Binder; Nicky Fellner; Volker Moser	Germany; Heiko Winkler; Stefan Wenzel; Jens Niemann	Austria; Carl Auteried Jr. Thomas Beclin; Martin Kendler
2002; Italy; Castiglione della Pescaia	Austria; Carl Auteried Jr. Martin Kendler; Thomas Beclin	Austria; Markus Schneeberger; Volker Moser; Christian Panek	Hungary; György Wossala; László Kovácsi; Károly Vezér
2003; Italy; Torbole	Hungary; Gyenese Balázs; Gyula Mónus; Károly Vezér	Germany; Roman Koch; Maxl Koch; Gregor Bornemann	Germany; Karl Haist; Daniel Diesing; Jacob Carsten
2004; Norway; Tonsberg	Austria; Markus Schneeberger; Volker Moser; Christian Panek	Slovenia; Boštjan Antončič; Gennadi Strakh; Zeljko Perovic	Norway; Pål Christoffersen; Karl Book; Espen Kamperhaug
2005; Netherlands; Medemblik	Germany; Roman Koch; Maxl Koch; Gregor Bornemann	Hungary; György Wossala; Pepe Németh; Károly Vezér	Norway; Dag Usterud; Arne Ottestad; Eskil Sønju Le Bruyn Goldeng
2006; Hungary; Balatonfüred	Ukraine; Serhiy Pichuhin; Ivan Chehlatiy; Serhiy Timokhov	Germany; Roman Koch; Maxl Koch; Gregor Bornemann	Austria; Carl Auteried Jr. Udo Moser; Martin Kendler
2007; Norway; Arendal	Slovenia; Boštjan Antončič; Gennadi Strakh; Serhiy Pichuhin	Germany; Thomas Maschkiwitz; Christian Öhler; Kristof Wossala	Argentina; Gustavo Warburg; Maximo Smith; Miguel Lacour
2008; Hungary; Balatonfüred	Hungary; György Wossala; Károly Vezér; Pepe Németh	Germany; Roman Koch; Maxl Koch; Gregor Bornemann	Netherlands; Johan Offermans; Bas Dusee; Dominik Meissner
2009; Italy; Lovere	Germany; Roman Koch; Maxl Koch; Gregor Bornemann	Austria; Carl Auteried Jr. Udo Moser; Martin Kendler	Hungary; György Wossala; Peper Németh; Károly Vezér
2010; France; La Trinite sur Mer	Hungary; György Wossala; Károly Vezér; Pepe Németh	Germany; Roman Koch; Maxl Koch; Gregor Bornemann	Argentina; Gustavo Warburg; Maximo Smith; Hernan Celedoni
2011; Austria; Attersee (lake)	Germany; Uwe Steingross; Karsten Eller; Tim Giesecke	United States; Stuart H. Walker; Georg Stadler; Johannes Spitzk	Austria; Johann Kahls; Christian Kahls; Ronnie Zeiler
2012; Denmark; Arhus	Argentina; Gustavo Warburg; Rodrigo Ferrés; Miguel Lacour	Germany; Karl Haist; Martin Zeileis; Patrick Wichmann	Netherlands; Rudy den Outer; Gavin Lidlow; Ramzi Souli
2013; Italy; Castiglione della Pescaia	Ukraine; Igor Yushko; Serhiy Pichuhin; Dmitriy Yarmolenka	Germany; Roman Koch; Maxl Koch; Gregor Bornemann	United States; Charlie Kamps; Jeremy McMahon; Toby Kamps
2014; Italy; Saint-Pierre-Quiberon	Germany; Uwe Steingross; Karsten Eller; Tim Giesecke	Canada; Peter Hall; Steve Lacey; William Hall	Netherlands; Rudy den Outer; Gavin Lidlow; Ramzi Souli
2015; Germany; Grünau (Berlin)	Germany; Jochen Schümann; Thomas Flach; Ingo Borkowski & Bernd Jäkel (last race)	Hungary; Litkey Farkas; Károly Vezér; Gabor Croszlan	Ukraine; Igor Yushko; Sergey Pichugin; Igor Severianov
2016; Austria; Ebensee am Traunsee	Austria; Christian Binder; Klaus Kratochwill; Christian Feichtinger	Hungary; Litkey Farkas; Joo Kristoff; Gabor Croszlan	Canada; Peter Hall; Steve Lacey; William Hall
2017; Italy; Riva del Garda	Hungary; Litkey Farkas; Károly Vezér; Csaba Weinhardt	Austria; Florian Felzmann; Michael Felzmann; Margund Schuh	Ukraine; Igor Yushko; Serhiy Pichuhin; Igor Severianov
2018; Hungary; Alsóörs	Hungary; Sándor Varjas; László Kovácsi; Gábor Meretei	Hungary; György Wossala; Peter Németh; Christoph Wossala	Hungary; Annamária Sabján; Bea Majoross; András Bajusz
2019; Italy; Torbole	Finland; Eki Heinonen; Gabor Helmhout; Mathias Heinonen	Hungary; Sándor Varjas; László Kovácsi; Gábor Meretei	Austria; Florian Felzmann; Michael Felzmann; Markus Gnan
2020; Germany; Warnemünde	Not held due to COVID-19		
2021; Spain; Santander	Rescheduled and relocated due to COVID-19		
2021; Italy; Mandello del Lario	Netherlands; Rudy den Outer; Theo de Lange; Ramzi Souli	Hungary; Sándor Varjas; László Kovácsi; Gábor Meretei	Hungary; György Wossala; Károly Vezér; Christoph Wossala
2022; Austria; Attersee (lake)	Austria; Florian Felzmann; Stephan Beurle; Michael Felzmann	Hungary; Sándor Varjas; László Kovácsi; Gábor Meretei	Austria; Christian Spiessberger; Max Reisinger; Gerhard Schlipfinger

== Medal table ==
1968 - 2022
Rank	Nation	Gold	Silver	Bronze	Total
1	Germany	8	9	3	20
2	Austria	6	6	6	18
3	Hungary	6	6	5	17
4	East Germany	5	5	6	16
5	Sweden	4	4	3	11
6	Denmark	4	3	4	11
7	Ukraine	4	1	3	8
8	Canada	3	2	2	7
9	Soviet Union	2	4	2	8
10	West Germany	2	2	5	9
11	Netherlands	2	2	4	8
12	Norway	2	1	4	7
13	United States	1	2	1	4
14	Slovenia	1	1	0	2
15	Argentina	1	0	2	3
16	Brazil	1	0	0	1
16	Finland	1	0	0	1
16	France	1	0	0	1
19	Great Britain	0	2	0	2
19	Russia	0	2	0	2
21	Australia	0	0	2	2
22	Italy	0	0	1	1
Totals (22 entries)		54	52	53	159

== Other statistics ==
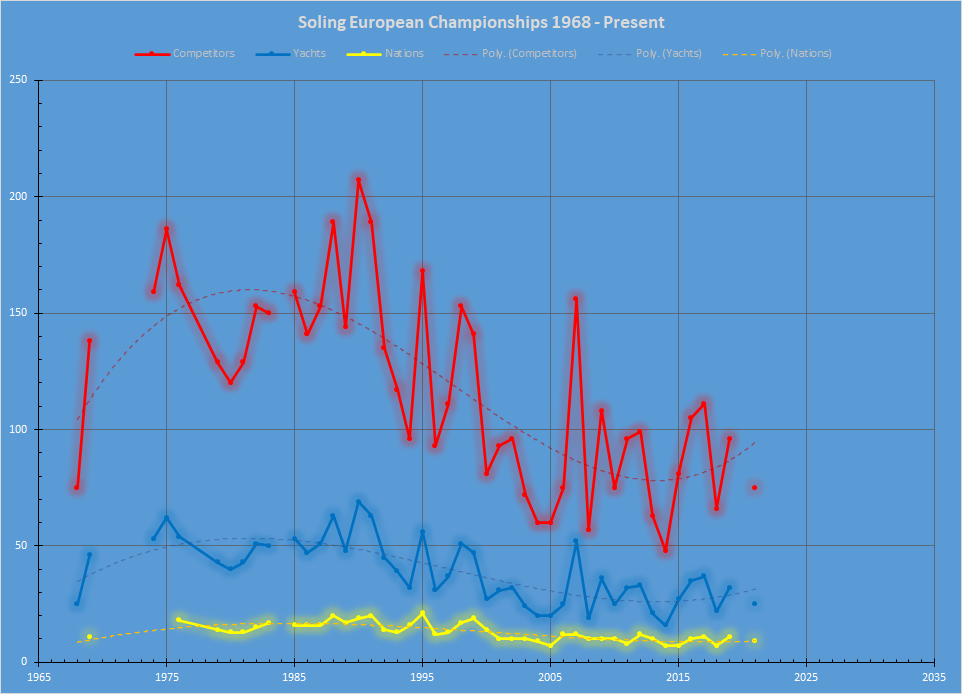
Soling European Championships DATA 1968 - Present

Competing Countries in the European Soling Championships
Country	Host	Visitor	Competed
Argentina		6	6
Australia		10	10
Austria	4	38	42
Belgium		2	2
Bermuda		1	1
Belarus		3	3
Brazil		8	8
Canada		23	23
Croatia		2	2
Czech Republic		3	3
East Germany	1	15	16
Denmark	4	33	37
Spain		11	11
Finland	1	17	18
France	5	26	31
West Germany	3	15	18
United Kingdom	2	28	30
Germany	1	29	30
Greece	1	9	10
Hungary	5	28	33
Ireland		4	4
Italy	10	25	35
Japan		5	5
Liechtenstein		1	1
Monaco		1	1
Netherlands	3	40	43
Norway	5	26	31
New Zealand		2	2
Pakistan		1	1
Poland		6	6
Portugal	1	3	4
South Africa		2	2
Russia		4	4
Slovenia	2	17	19
Switzerland	1	13	14
Slovakia		3	3
Sweden	3	22	25
Ukraine		12	12
Soviet Union		13	13
United States		34	34
Yugoslavia		1	1

== Race details ==
For further detailed results see:

- Soling European Championship results (1968–1979)
- Soling European Championship results (1980–1984)
- Soling European Championship results (1985–1989)
- Soling European Championship results (1990–1994)
- Soling European Championship results (1995–1999)
- Soling European Championship results (2000–2004)
- Soling European Championship results (2005–2009)
- Soling European Championship results (2010–2014)
- Soling European Championship results (2015–2019)
- Soling European Championship results (2020–2024)
