= Sailing at the 1976 Summer Olympics – Soling =

Sailing at the Olympics

Soling at the Games of the XXI Olympiad
- Soling
- Venue: Kingston
- Dates: 19 to 27 July
- Competitors: 72 from 24 nations
- Teams: 24

Medalists
1st place, gold medalist(s)		Poul Richard Høj Jensen; Valdemar Bandolowski; Erik Hansen	Denmark
2nd place, silver medalist(s)		John Kolius; Walter Glasgow; Richard Hoepfner	United States
3rd place, bronze medalist(s)		Dieter Below; Michael Zachries; Olaf Engelhardt	East Germany

The Soling was a sailing event on the Sailing at the 1976 Summer Olympics program in Kingston, Ontario . Seven races were scheduled. 72 sailors, on 24 boats, from 24 nations competed.

== Results ==
Rank	Country	Helmsman	Crew	Race 1		Race 2		Race 3		Race 4		Race 5		Race 6		Race 7		Total	Total – discard
Rank	Country	Helmsman	Crew	Pos.	Pts.	Pos.	Pts.	Pos.	Pts.	Pos.	Pts.	Pos.	Pts.	Pos.	Pts.	Pos.	Pts.	Total	Total – discard
1st place, gold medalist(s)	Denmark	Poul Richard Høj Jensen	Valdemar Bandolowski; Erik Hansen	2	3.0	2	3.0	~~13~~	~~19.0~~	6	11.7	13	19.0	1	0.0	5	10.0	65.7	46.7
2nd place, silver medalist(s)	United States	John Kolius	Walter Glasgow; Richard Hoepfner	8	14.0	3	5.7	~~11~~	~~17.0~~	2	3.0	7	13.0	6	11.7	1	0.0	64.4	47.4
3rd place, bronze medalist(s)	East Germany	Dieter Below	Michael Zachries; Olaf Engelhardt	5	10.0	4	8.0	3	5.7	3	5.7	5	10.0	4	8.0	~~7~~	~~13.0~~	60.4	47.4
4	Soviet Union	Boris Budnikov	Valentin Zamotaykin; Nikolai Poliakov	4	8.0	1	0.0	12	18.0	~~DSQ~~	~~33.0~~	3	5.7	8	14.0	2	3.0	81.7	48.7
5	Netherlands	Geert Bakker	Pieter Keijzer; Harald de Vlaming	14	20.0	5	10.0	2	3.0	~~RET~~	~~30.0~~	1	0.0	5	10.0	9	15.0	88.0	58.0
6	West Germany	Willy Kuhweide	Karsten Meyer; Axel May	~~11~~	~~17.0~~	7	13.0	4	8.0	4	8.0	11	17.0	2	3.0	6	11.7	77.7	60.7
7	France	Patrick Haegeli	Patrick Oeuvrard; Bruno Trouble	1	0.0	13	19.0	1	0.0	5	10.0	~~17~~	~~23.0~~	11	17.0	12	18.7	87.0	64.0
8	Canada	Glen Dexter	Sandy MacMillan; Andreas Josenhans	9	15.0	8	14.0	10	16.0	1	0.0	12	18.0	3	5.7	~~13~~	~~19.0~~	87.7	68.7
9	Sweden	Jörgen Sundelin	Peter Sundelin; Stefan Sundelin	3	5.7	~~14~~	~~20.0~~	9	15.0	8	14.0	2	3.0	12	18.0	10	16.0	91.7	71.7
10	Brazil	Gastão Brun	Vicente Brun; Andreas Wengert	~~17~~	~~23.0~~	9	15.0	6	11.7	16	22.0	4	8.0	13	19.0	3	5.7	104.4	81.4
11	Australia	David Forbes	John Anderson; Denis O'Neil	19	25.0	6	11.7	14	20.0	9	15	~~DSQ~~	~~33.0~~	7	13.0	4	8.0	125.7	92.7
12	Spain	Juan Costas	Humberto Costas; Félix Anglada	10	16.0	11	17.0	8	14.0	10	16	~~16~~	~~22.0~~	9	15.0	11	17.0	117.0	95.0
13	Great Britain	Iain MacDonald-Smith	Michael Baker-Harber; Barry Dunning	15	21.0	16	22.0	5	10.0	13	19	8	14.0	10	16.0	~~RET~~	~~30.0~~	132.0	102.0
14	Greece	George Andreadis	Konstantinos Lymberakis; Georgios Perrakis	18	24.0	12	18.0	~~19~~	~~25.0~~	12	18.0	6	11.7	17	23.0	8	14.0	133.7	108.7
15	Italy	Fabio Albarelli	Gianfranco Oradini; Leopoldo Di Martino	16	22.0	10	16.0	7	13.0	7	13.0	~~RET~~	~~30.0~~	19	25.0	16	22.0	141.0	111.0
16	Norway	Peder Lunde Jr.	Morten Rieker; Kim Torkildsen	6	11.7	20	26.0	~~21~~	~~27.0~~	11	17.0	14	20.0	18	24.0	14	20.0	145.7	118.7
17	Austria	Hubert Raudaschl	Walter Raudaschl; Rudolf Mayr	13	19.0	17	23.0	15	21.0	~~20~~	~~26.0~~	9	15.0	16	22.0	17	23.0	149.0	123.0
18	Finland	Matti Jokinen	Matti Paloheimo; Reijo Laine	9	15.0	19	25.0	20	26.0	17	23.0	20	26.0	~~DSQ~~	~~33.0~~	15	21.0	167.0	134.0
19	New Zealand	Hugh Poole	Gavin Bornholdt; Chris Urry	~~20~~	~~26.0~~	15	21.0	17	23.0	15	21.0	19	25.0	15	21.0	18	24.0	161.0	135.0
20	Argentina	Pedro Ferrero	Andrés Robinson; Jorge Rão	~~22~~	~~28.0~~	22	28.0	18	24.0	14	20.0	15	21.0	14	20.0	19	25.0	166.0	138.0
21	Bermuda	Richard Belvin	Gordon Flood; Raymond Pitman	12	18.0	18	24.0	~~RET~~	~~30.0~~	22	28.0	10	16.0	22	28.0	21	27.0	171.0	141.0
22	Puerto Rico	Juan R. Torruella	James Fairbank; Lee Gentil	~~21~~	~~27.0~~	21	27.0	16	22.0	19	25.0	21	27.0	20	26.0	20	26.0	180.0	153.0
23	Monaco	Gérard Battaglia	Jean-Pierre Borro; Claude Rossi	23	29.0	23	29.0	23	29.0	18	24.0	18	24.0	~~DSQ~~	~~33.0~~	23	29.0	197.0	164.0
24	Virgin Islands	Dick Johnson	Tim Kelbert; Doug Graham	~~24~~	~~30.0~~	24	30.0	22	28.0	21	27.0	22	28.0	21	27.0	22	28.0	198.0	168.0

Legend: DSQ – Disqualified; RET – Retired;
Gender: – male; – female;

=== Daily standings ===
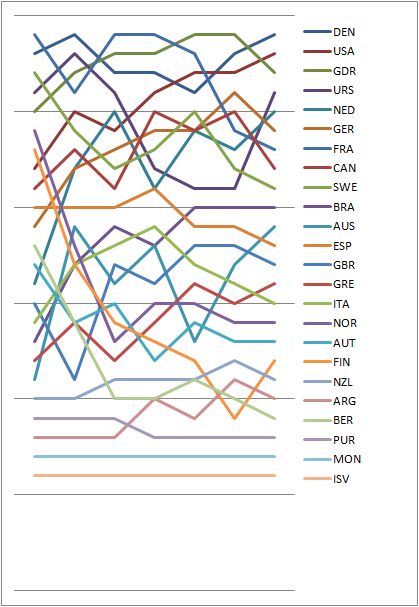
Graph showing the daily standings in the Soling during the 1976 Summer Olympics
