= Rudolf Mayr =

Austrian sailor

Personal information
- Nationality: Austrian
- Born: 16 January 1949 (age 76) Thalgau, Austria
- Height: 1.74 m (5.7 ft)

Sport

Sailing career
- Class: Soling
- Updated on 27 February 2020

Rudolf Mayr (born 16 January 1949 in Thalgau) is a sailor from Austria, who represented his country at the 1976 Summer Olympics in Kingston, Ontario, Canada as crew member in the Soling. With helmsman Hubert Raudaschl and fellow crew member Walter Raudaschl they took the 17th place.

== Sources ==
- "Rudolf Mayr Bio, Stats, and Results". Olympic Sports. Sports-Reference.com. Archived from the original on 7 November 2012.
