= Chris Urry =

New Zealand sailor

Personal information
- Full name: Christopher K. Urry
- Nationality: New Zealand
- Born: 29 August 1952 (age 73) Wellington, New Zealand

Sport
- Country: New Zealand
- Sport: Sailing

Christopher K. Urry (born 29 August 1952) is a former New Zealand male sailor. He represented New Zealand at the 1976 Summer Olympics and competed in the Soling event (mixed three person keelboat event) along with compatriot, Gavin Bornholdt.
