= Roland Schwarz =

Roland Schwarz may refer to:

- Roland Schwarz (sailor)
- Roland Schwarz (wrestler)
