= Gianfranco Oradini =

Olympic sailor from Italy

Personal information
- Nationality: Italian
- Born: 20 June 1952 (age 72); Italy
- Height: 1.80 m (5.9 ft)

Sailing career
- Class: Soling
- Updated on 27 February 2020

Gianfranco Oradini (born 20 June 1952 is a sailor from Italy, who represented his country at the 1976 Summer Olympics in Kingston, Ontario, Canada as crew member in the Soling. With helmsman Fabio Albarelli and fellow crew member Leopoldo Di Martino they took the 15th place.

== Sources ==
- "Gianfranco Oradini Bio, Stats, and Results". Olympic Sports. Sports-Reference.com. Archived from the original on 3 September 2011.
