= Jean-Pierre Borro =

Monegasque sailor (born 1938)

Personal information
- Born: 6 May 1938 (age 86); Monaco
- Height: 1.67 m (5.5 ft)

Sailing career
- Class: Soling
- Updated on 27 February 2020

Jean-Pierre Borro (born 6 May 1938, in Monaco) is a sailor from Monaco, who represented his country at the 1976 Summer Olympics in Kingston, Ontario, Canada as crew member in the Soling. With helmsman Gérard Battaglia and fellow crew member Claude Rossi they took the 23rd place.

== Sources ==
- "Jean-Pierre Borro Bio, Stats, and Results". Olympic Sports. Sports-Reference.com. Archived from the original on 11 June 2015.
