= Axel May =

German competitive sailor (born 1948)

Personal information
- Nationality: German
- Born: 13 August 1948 (age 78) West Germany
- Height: 1.80 m (5.9 ft)

Sailing career
- Sport: Sailing
- Club: Norddeutscher Regatta Verein
- Classes: Soling, Dragon
- Updated on 26 Februar 2020

Axel May (born 13 August 1948 is a sailor from the West-Germany, who represented his country at three Olympic Games. The first time was the 1968 Summer Olympics in Acapulco, Mexico as crew member in the Dragon Class. With helmsman Klaus Oldendorff and fellow crew member Peter Stülcken they took the 7th place. The second appearance was the 1976 Summer Olympics in Kingston, Ontario, Canada as crew member in the Soling. With helmsman Willi Kuhweide and fellow crew member Karsten Meyer they took the 5th place. His final Olympics were the 1984 Summer Olympics in Los Angeles, United States as crew member in the Soling. With helmsman Willi Kuhweide and fellow crew member Eckard Löll they took the 8th place.

== Sources ==
- "Axel May Bio, Stats, and Results". Olympic Sports. Sports-Reference.com. Archived from the original on 15 December 2012.
