= Leopoldo Di Martino =

Olympic sailor from Italy

Personal information
- Nationality: Italian
- Born: 10 February 1949 (age 76) Rovereto, Italy
- Height: 1.83 m (6.0 ft)

Sport

Sailing career
- Class: Soling
- Updated on 27 February 2020

Leopoldo Di Martino (born 10 February 1949 in Rovereto is a sailor from Italy, who represented his country at the 1976 Summer Olympics in Kingston, Ontario, Canada as crew member in the Soling. With helmsman Fabio Albarelli and fellow crew member Gianfranco Oradini, they took 15th place.

== Sources ==
- "Leopoldo Di Martino Bio, Stats, and Results". Olympic Sports. Sports-Reference.com. Archived from the original on 23 September 2011.
