= René Battaglia =

Monegasque weightlifter (born 1939)

René Battaglia (born 27 November 1939) is a former weightlifter who represented Monaco at the 1964 Summer Olympic Games. Battaglia lifted a total of 407.5kg and finished sixteenth in the Men's 82.5 kg event of the 1964 Summer Olympic Games.

== Personal life ==
His cousin Philippe and uncle Gérard both represented Monaco at the Olympic Games in sailing.
