= Ab Ekels =

Dutch sailor (born 1950)

Personal information
- Full name: Albert Sybrandus Ekels
- Nationality: Dutch
- Born: 5 December 1950 (age 75) Hilversum, Netherlands
- Height: 1.90 m (6.2 ft)

Sailing career
- Sport: Sailing
- Club: "Koninklijke Watersport Vereniging Loosdrecht"
- Classes: Tempest, Star, Dragon
- Updated on 2013-12-21

Albert Sybrandus "Ab" Ekels (born 5 December 1950, in Hilversum) is a sailor from the Netherlands, who represented his country at the 1976 Summer Olympics in Kingston, Canada. With helmsman Ben Staartjes Ekels took the 8th place in the Tempest. Ekels later specialized in the Star and Dragon together with fellow crew members Harald de Vlaming and helmsman Pieter Keijzer.

Ab Ekels was head of the Dutch Olympic Sailing Team for the 2012 Summer Olympics.

== Sources ==
- Evans, Hilary; Gjerde, Arild; Heijmans, Jeroen; Mallon, Bill; et al. "Ab Ekels". Olympics at Sports-Reference.com. Sports Reference LLC. Archived from the original on 18 April 2020.
- "Nederlandse delegatie" (in Dutch). Leeuwarder courant : hoofdblad van Friesland. 12 July 1976.
- "Olympische zeilselectie" (in Dutch). De Telegraaf. 20 May 1976.
- "Montréal 1976 Official Report, Volume I: Organization" (PDF). Ottawa: COJO. 1978. Archived from the original (PDF) on 2 February 2014.
- "Montréal 1976 Official Report, Volume II: Facilities" (PDF). Ottawa: COJO. 1978. Archived from the original (PDF) on 2 February 2014.
- "Montréal 1976 Official Report, Volume III: Results" (PDF). Ottawa: COJO. 1978. Archived from the original (PDF) on 1 January 2014.
- "Albert (Ab) S. Ekels". linkedin.com.
