= Doug Graham (sailor) =

United States Virgin Islands sailor

Personal information
- Full name: Douglas Graham
- Nationality: American Virgin Islander
- Born: December 2, 1959 (age 65); United States Virgin Islands
- Height: 1.85 m (6.1 ft)

Sailing career
- Class: Soling
- Updated on February 27, 2020

Douglas "Doug" Graham (born December 2, 1959) is a sailor from the U.S. Virgin Islands, who represented his country at the 1976 Summer Olympics in Kingston, Ontario, Canada, as crew member on the Soling. With helmsman Dick Johnson and fellow crew member Tim Kelbert, they took the 24th place.
