= Dick Johnson (sailor) =

United States Virgin Islands sailor

Personal information
- Full name: Richard W. Johnson
- Nationality: United States Virgin Islands
- Born: April 28, 1923 Chicago, United States
- Died: June 21, 2005 (aged 82) Saint Thomas
- Height: 1.80 m (5 ft 11 in)

Sailing career
- Sport: Sailing
- Class: Soling
- Updated on February 27, 2020

Richard W. "Dick" Johnson (April 28, 1923 – June 21, 2005) was a sailor from United States Virgin Islands, who represented his country at the 1976 Summer Olympics in Kingston, Ontario, Canada as helmsman in the Soling. With crew members Tim Kelbert and Doug Graham they took the 24th place.

== Sources ==
- Evans, Hilary; Gjerde, Arild; Heijmans, Jeroen; Mallon, Bill; et al. "Dick Johnson". Olympics at Sports-Reference.com. Sports Reference LLC. Archived from the original on December 18, 2012.
- "Montréal 1976 Official Report, Volume III: Results: Yachting Soling" (PDF). Ottawa: COJO. 1978.
