= Reijo Laine =

Olympic sailor from Finland

Personal information
- Full name: Reijo Artturi Laine
- Nationality: Finnish
- Born: 28 January 1937 (age 89) Helsinki, Finland
- Height: 1.65 m (5.4 ft)

Sport

Sailing career
- Class: Soling
- Club: Merenkävijät
- Updated on 27 February 2020

Reijo Laine (born 28 January 1937 in Helsinki) is a sailor from Finland, who represented his country at the 1976 Summer Olympics in Kingston, Ontario, Canada as crew member in the Soling. With helmsman Matti Jokinen and fellow crew member Matti Paloheimo they took the 18th place.
