= Stavros Psarrakis =

Greek sailor

Personal information
- Native name: Σταύρος Ψαρράκης
- Nationality: Greek
- Born: 14 September 1939 (age 87) Pireaus, Greece
- Height: 1.78 m (5.8 ft)

Sailing career
- Sport: Sailing
- Club: Nautikos Omilos Ellados
- Class: Flying Dutchman
- Updated on 26 February 2020

Stavros Psarrakis (born 14 September 1939 in Pireaus) is a sailor from Greece, who represented his country at the 1968 Summer Olympics in Acapulco, Mexico as crew member in the Flying Dutchman. With helmsman George Andreadis they took the 22nd place.
