= Matti Paloheimo =

Olympic sailor from Finland

Personal information
- Full name: Matti Ilmari Paloheimo
- Nationality: Finnish
- Born: 4 December 1935 (age 90) Kainuu, Finland
- Height: 1.79 m (5.9 ft)

Sailing career
- Sport: Sailing
- Club: Merenkävijät
- Class: Soling
- Updated on 27 February 2020

Matti Paloheimo (born 4 December 1935 in Kainuu) is a sailor from Finland, who represented his country at the 1976 Summer Olympics in Kingston, Ontario, Canada as crew member in the Soling. With helmsman Matti Jokinen and fellow crew member Reijo Laine they took the 18th place.
