= Kim Torkildsen =

Norwegian sailor

Personal information
- Nationality: Norwegian
- Born: 30 April 1945 (age 79); Oslo, Norway

Sport
- Sport: Sailing

Kim Torkildsen (born 30 April 1945) is a Norwegian sailor. He was born in Oslo. He competed at the 1976 Summer Olympics in Montreal, where he placed 16th in three-person keelboat, together with Morten Rieker and Peder Lunde Jr.
