= Lothar Koepsel =

German sailor

Personal information
- Full name: Lothar Koepsel
- Nationality: East Germany
- Born: 20 July 1945 (age 81) Berlin, Germany
- Height: 1.72 m (5.6 ft)

Sailing career
- Sport: Sailing
- Club: SC Berlin-Grünau
- Class: Soling

Lothar Koepsel (born 20 July 1945, in Berlin) is a sailor from East Germany. Koepsel represented his country at the 1972 Summer Olympics in Kiel. Koepsels took 14th place in the Soling with Roland Schwarz as helmsman and Werner Christoph as fellow crew member.
