= Konstantinos Lymberakis =

Greek sailor (born 1942)

Personal information
- Native name: Κωνσταντίνος Λυμπεράκης
- Nationality: Greek
- Born: 31 October 1942 (age 82); Greece
- Height: 1.73 m (5.7 ft)

Sailing career
- Class: Soling
- Club: Nautikos Omilos Ellados
- Updated on 26 February 2020

Konstantinos Lymberakis (born 31 October 1942 is a sailor from Greece, who represented his country at the 1976 Summer Olympics in Kingston, Ontario, Canada as crew member in the Soling. With helmsman George Andreadis and fellow crew member Georgios Perrakis, they took the 14th place. He also competed in the Flying Dutchman event at the 1960 Summer Olympics.

== Sources ==
- "Konstantinos Lymberakis Bio, Stats, and Results". Olympic Sports. Sports-Reference.com. Archived from the original on 11 November 2012.
