= Tim Kelbert =

United States Virgin Islands sailor

Personal information
- Full name: Timothy Kelbert
- Nationality: American Virgin Islander
- Born: October 30, 1959 (age 66) United States Virgin Islands
- Height: 1.85 m (6.1 ft)

Sailing career
- Sport: Sailing
- Class: Soling
- Updated on February 27, 2020

Timothy Kelbert (born October 30, 1959) is a sailor from the United States Virgin Islands, who represented his country at the 1976 Summer Olympics in Kingston, Ontario, Canada as crew member in the Soling. With helmsman Dick Johnson and fellow crew member Doug Graham they took the 24th place.

== Sources ==
- Evans, Hilary; Gjerde, Arild; Heijmans, Jeroen; Mallon, Bill; et al. "Tim Kelbert". Olympics at Sports-Reference.com. Sports Reference LLC. Archived from the original on December 13, 2012.
