= Georgios Perrakis =

Greek sailor

Personal information
- Native name: Γεώργιος Περράκης
- Nationality: Greek
- Born: 12 July 1946 (age 78); Pireaus, Greece
- Height: 1.72 m (5.6 ft)

Sailing career
- Class: Soling
- Club: Nautikos Omilos Ellados
- Updated on 26 February 2020

Georgios Perrakis (born 12 July 1946 in Pireaus) is a sailor who represented Greece at the 1976 Summer Olympics Soling event in Kingston, Ontario, Canada, with helmsman George Andreadis and crew member Konstantinos Lymberakis, taking 14th place.

== Sources ==
- "Georgios Perrakis Bio, Stats, and Results". Olympic Sports. Sports-Reference.com. Archived from the original on 11 November 2012.
