= Philippe Battaglia =

Monegasque sailor (born 1958)

Personal information
- Nationality: Monaco
- Born: 12 September 1958 (age 67)

Sailing career
- Sport: Sailing

Philippe Battaglia (born 12 September 1958) competed in the 1988 Olympic Games in sailing for Monaco.

== Career ==
Battaglia finished 30th in the Finn class at the 1988 Olympic Games. Along with David Lajoux he finished 78th in the 1998 Star World Championships and 91st in the 1999 Star World Championships.

== Personal life ==
Battaglia's father Gérard and cousin René both represented Monaco in the Olympic Games.
