= Morten Rieker =

Norwegian sailor (1940–2024)

Personal information
- Nationality: Norwegian
- Born: 11 December 1940 Oslo, Norway
- Died: 13 April 2024 (aged 83) Norway

Sport
- Sport: Sailing

Morten Rieker (11 December 1940 – 13 April 2024) was a Norwegian sailor. He was born in Oslo. He competed at the 1976 Summer Olympics in Montreal where he placed 16th in three-person keelboat, together with Kim Torkildsen and Peder Lunde Jr. He died on 13 April 2024 aged 83.
