= Matti Jokinen =

Finnish sailor

Personal information
- Full name: Veli-Matti Jokinen
- Nationality: Finnish
- Born: 8 February 1936 Turku, Finland
- Died: 5 October 2004 (aged 65) Espoo
- Height: 1.80 m (5.9 ft)

Sailing career
- Sport: Sailing
- Class: Soling
- Updated on 27 February 2020

Matti Jokinen (born 8 February 1936 in Turku, died 5 October 2004 in Espoo) was a sailor from Finland, who represented his country at the 1976 Summer Olympics in Kingston, Ontario, Canada as helmsman in the Soling. With crew members Matti Paloheimo and Reijo Laine they finished in 18th place.
