= Karsten Meyer (sailor) =

German sailor

Personal information
- Full name: Max Adolf Karsten Meyer
- Nationality: German
- Born: 5 November 1937 Hannover, Niedersachsen
- Died: 25 November 2023 (aged 86)
- Height: 185 cm (6 ft 1 in)
- Weight: 90 kg (198 lb)

Sailing career
- Sport: Sailing
Medal record
Representing West Germany
Olympic Games
| Bronze medal – third place | 1972 Munich | Star |
Star World Championship
| Gold medal – first place | 1972 Caracas | Star |
Soling European Championship
| Gold medal – first place | 1974 United Kingdom | Soling |
| Silver medal – second place | 1977 Greece | Soling |

Max Adolf Karsten Meyer (5 November 1937 – 25 November 2023) was a German competitive sailor and Olympic medalist. He won a bronze medal in the Star class at the 1972 Summer Olympics in Munich, together with Wilhelm Kuhweide.
