= George Andreadis (sailor) =

Greek sailor

Personal information
- Native name: Γεώργιος Ανδρεάδης
- Full name: Georgios Andreadis
- Nationality: Greek
- Born: 30 September 1941 Attiki, Athens, Greece
- Died: 24 June 2023 (aged 81)
- Height: 1.80 m (5.9 ft)

Sailing career
- Sport: Sailing
- Club: Nautikos Omilos Ellados
- Class: Soling
- Updated on 26 February 2020

Georgios "George" Andreadis (30 September 1941 – 24 June 2023) was a sailor from Greece who represented his country at two Olympic Games. The first time was the 1968 Summer Olympics in Acapulco, Mexico as helmsman in the Flying Dutchman. With crew Stavros Psarrakis they took the 22nd place. The second appearance was the 1976 Summer Olympics in Kingston, Ontario, Canada as helmsman in the Soling. With crew members Georgios Perrakis and Konstantinos Lymberakis they took the 14th place.

Andreadis was born in Attiki, Athens. He fulfilled several roles within World Sailing one of them is the role of Vice President. In 2010, he was a recipient of the Silver Olympic Order. He died in Athens in June 2023.

== Sources ==
- "George Andreadi Bio, Stats, and Results". Olympic Sports. Sports-Reference.com. Archived from the original on 11 November 2012.
