= Claude Rossi =

Monegasque sailor (born 1937)

Personal information
- Born: 22 December 1937 (age 87); Monaco
- Height: 1.74 m (5.7 ft)

Sailing career
- Class: Soling
- Updated on 27 February 2020

Claude Rossi (born 22 December 1937 in Monaco) is a sailor from Monaco, who represented his country at the 1976 Summer Olympics in Kingston, Ontario, Canada as crew member in the Soling. With helmsman Gérard Battaglia and fellow crew member Jean-Pierre Borro they took the 23rd place.

== Sources ==
- "Claude Rossi Bio, Stats, and Results". Olympic Sports. Sports-Reference.com. Archived from the original on 11 June 2015.
