= Pieter Keijzer =

Dutch sailor (born 1949)

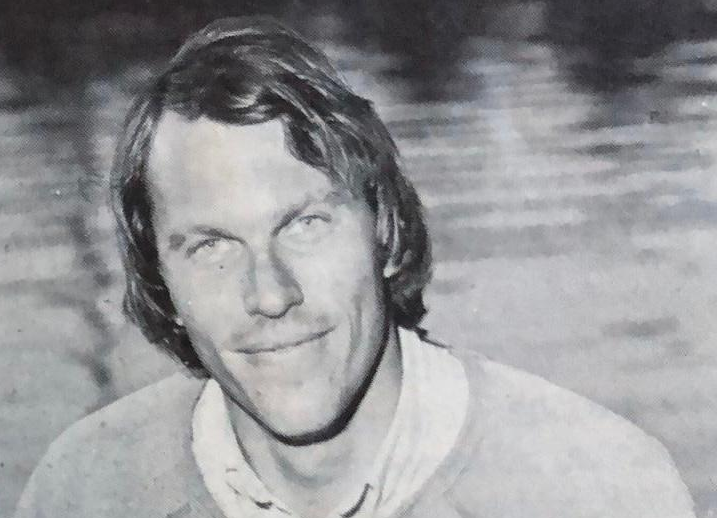
- Keijzer in 1976

Personal information
- Full name: Pieter Keijzer
- Nationality: Dutch
- Born: 10 April 1949 (age 77) Amsterdam
- Height: 1.92 m (6.3 ft)

Sailing career
- Sport: Sailing
- Club: Koninklijke Nederlandsche Zeil en Roei Vereeniging
- Classes: Soling; Dragon
Medal record
Sailing
Representing Netherlands
European Championship
Silver medal – second place	1979 La Rochelle	Soling
- Updated on 2014-01-29

Pieter Keijzer (born 10 April 1949 in Amsterdam) is a sailor from the Netherlands, who represented his country at the 1976 Summer Olympics in Kingston, Canada. With helmsman Geert Bakker and fellow crew member Harald de Vlaming Keijzer took the 5th place in the Soling. Pieter later specialized as helmsman in the Dragon, racing together with Ab Ekels and Harald de Vlaming.

Pieter Keijzer was head of the Dutch Olympic Sailing Team for the 2008 Summer Olympics and is past president of the Koninklijke Nederlandsche Zeil en Roei Vereeniging.

== Sources ==
- "Pieter Keijzer Bio, Stats, and Results". Olympic Sports. Sports-Reference.com. Archived from the original on 2020-04-18.
- "Nederlandse delegatie" (in Dutch). Leeuwarder courant : hoofdblad van Friesland. 1976-07-12.
- "Olympische zeilselectie" (in Dutch). De Telegraaf. 1976-05-20.
- "Montréal 1976 Official Report, Volume I: Organization" (PDF). Ottawa: COJO. 1978. Archived from the original (PDF) on February 2, 2014.
- "Montréal 1976 Official Report, Volume II: Facilities" (PDF). Ottawa: COJO. 1978. Archived from the original (PDF) on February 2, 2014.
- "Montréal 1976 Official Report, Volume III: Results" (PDF). Ottawa: COJO. 1978. Archived from the original (PDF) on January 1, 2014.
- "Bestuur en commissies KNZ&RV". Bestuur en commissies (in Dutch). www.knzrv.nl. Archived from the original on 2013-12-24.
- "Uitslagen Nederlandse Draken Club". Uitslagen Nederlandse Draken Club (in Dutch). dragonclass.nl.
