= Harald de Vlaming =

Dutch sailor (1954–2023)

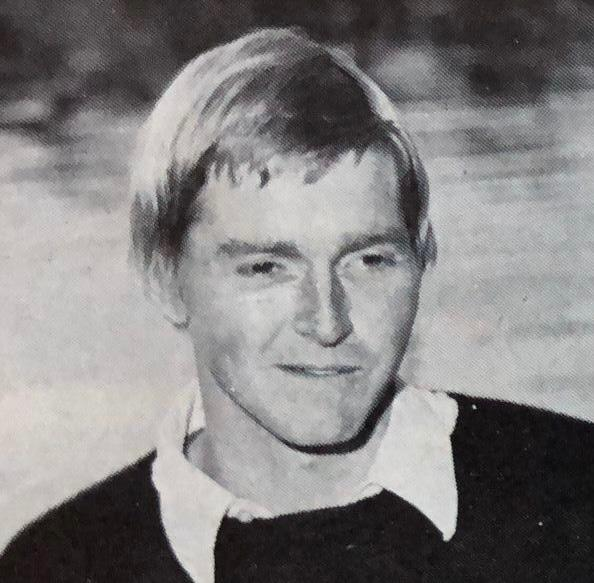
- De Vlaming in 1976

Personal information
- Full name: Harald Frederik de Vlaming
- Nationality: Dutch
- Born: 28 June 1954 Baarn, Netherlands
- Died: 23 January 2023 (aged 68) Obergurgl, Austria
- Height: 1.87 m (6 ft 2 in)

Sailing career
- Sport: Sailing
- Club: Koninklijke Nederlandsche Zeil en Roei Vereeniging
- Coached by: Jack van Hellemond
- Classes: Soling; Dragon
Medal record
Sailing
Representing Netherlands
European Championship
| Silver medal – second place | 1979 La Rochelle | Soling |
- Updated on 2 February 2023

Harald de Vlaming (28 June 1954 – 23 January 2023) was a sailor from the Netherlands, who represented his native country at the 1976 Summer Olympics Kingston, Ontario, Canada. With helmsman Geert Bakker and fellow crew member Pieter Keijzer De Vlaming took the 5th place in the Soling. De Vlaming later specialized as crew in the Dragon, racing together with Ab Ekels and helmsman Pieter Keijzer.

Harald was retired from a career in the banking industry.

== Sources ==
- "Harald de Vlaming Bio, Stats, and Results". Olympic Sports. Sports-Reference.com. Archived from the original on 18 April 2020.
- "Nederlandse delegatie". Leeuwarder courant : hoofdblad van Friesland (in Dutch). 12 July 1976.
- "Olympische zeilselectie". De Telegraaf (in Dutch). 20 May 1976.
- "Montréal 1976 Official Report, Volume I: Organization" (PDF). Ottawa: COJO. 1978. Archived from the original (PDF) on 2 February 2014.
- "Montréal 1976 Official Report, Volume II: Facilities" (PDF). Ottawa: COJO. 1978. Archived from the original (PDF) on 2 February 2014.
- "Montréal 1976 Official Report, Volume III: Results" (PDF). Ottawa: COJO. 1978. Archived from the original (PDF) on 1 January 2014.
- "Uitslagen Nederlandse Draken Club". Uitslagen. dragonclass.nl.
- "Harald de Vlaming". www.linkedin.com.
- "In memoriam Harald de Vlaming". Nederlandse Vereniging Van Olympische Deelnemers (in Dutch). 12 February 2023.
