= Charles Reynolds (sailor) =

British sailor

Personal information
- Nationality: Great Britain
- Born: Charles Lewis Reynolds; 18 March 1943 (age 83)

Sport
- Sport: Sailing

Charles Lewis Reynolds (born 18 March 1943) is a British sailor. He competed at the 1968 and 1972 Summer Olympics.

Reynolds was the son of Guy Reynolds, a royal natal commodore.

In 1971, Reynolds and his teammates John Oakeley and Barry Dunning won two races at the Hamble River Olympic Training Series.
