= Patrick Oeuvrard =

French sailor (born 1945)

Patrick Oeuvrard (born 31 May 1945) is a French sailor who competed in the 1976 Summer Olympics.
