= Edwin Bernet =

Swiss sailor

Personal information
- Nationality: Swiss
- Born: 16 March 1935 (age 90); Zürich, Switzerland

Sport
- Sport: Sailing

Edwin Bernet (born 16 March 1935) is a Swiss sailor. He competed at the 1968 Summer Olympics and the 1972 Summer Olympics.
