= Walter Raudaschl =

Austrian sailor

Personal information
- Nationality: Austrian
- Born: 17 November 1954 (age 71) Sankt Gilgen am Wolfgangsee, Austria
- Height: 1.80 m (5.9 ft)

Sport

Sailing career
- Class: Soling
- Updated on 27 February 2020

Walter Raudaschl (born 17 November 1954 in Sankt Gilgen am Wolfgangsee) is a sailor from Austria, who represented his country at the 1976 Summer Olympics in Kingston, Ontario, Canada as crew member in the Soling. With helmsman Hubert Raudaschl and fellow crew member Rudolf Mayr they took the 17th place.

== Sources ==
- "Walter Raudaschl Bio, Stats, and Results". Olympic Sports. Sports-Reference.com. Archived from the original on 7 November 2012.
