= Gavin Bornholdt =

New Zealand sailor

Personal information
- Born: 26 November 1947 Lower Hutt, Wellington, New Zealand
- Died: 12 November 2011 (aged 63) New Zealand

Sport
- Sport: Sailing

Gavin Bornholdt (26 November 1947 – 12 November 2011) was a New Zealand sailor. He competed in the mixed three person keelboat event at the 1976 Summer Olympics.
