= Bertrand Cheret =

French sailor

Bertrand Cheret (born 23 May 1937) is a French sailor who competed in the 1968 Summer Olympics and in the 1972 Summer Olympics.
