= Dieter Below =

German sailor (born 1942)

Medal record

Sailing

Representing East Germany

Olympic Games
Bronze medal – third place	1976 Montreal	Soling class

Dieter Below (born 23 June 1942) is a German sailor. He won a bronze medal in the Soling Class with Michael Zachries and Olaf Engelhardt at the 1976 Summer Olympics in Montreal.
