= Rais Galimov =

Soviet sailor

Personal information
- Full name: Rais Mustafayevich Galimov
- Nationality: Soviet Union
- Born: October 5, 1946 (age 80) Kazan
- Height: 1.77 m (5.8 ft)

Sailing career
- Sport: Sailing
- Class: Soling

Rais Mustafayevich Galimov (Russian: Раис Мустафаевич Галимов; Tatar: Рәис Мостафа улы Галимов; born 5 October 1946, in Kazan) is a sailor from the Soviet Union. Galimov represented his country at the 1972 Summer Olympics in Kiel. Galimov took 7th place in the Soling with Timir Pinegin as helmsman and Valentin Zamotaykin as fellow crew member.
