= Patrick Haegeli =

French sailor

Patrick Haegeli (born 13 April 1946) is a French sailor who competed in the 1976 Summer Olympics, in the 1984 Summer Olympics, and in the 1992 Summer Olympics.
