= Olaf Engelhardt =

German sailor

Medal record

Sailing

Representing East Germany

Olympic Games
Bronze medal – third place	1976 Montreal	Soling class

Olaf Engelhardt (born 2 March 1951) is a German sailor. He won a bronze medal in the Soling Class with Dieter Below and Michael Zachries at the 1976 Summer Olympics in Montreal.
