= Geert Bakker =

Dutch sailor (1921–1993)

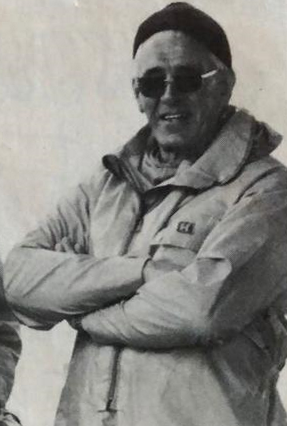
- Bakker in 1976

Personal information
- Full name: Geert Alle Bakker
- Nationality: Dutch
- Born: 15 January 1921 Appingedam
- Died: 7 August 1993 (aged 72) Warmond
- Height: 1.94 m (6.4 ft)

Sailing career
- Sport: Sailing
- Club: Koninklijke Watersport Vereniging; De Kaag
- Class: Soling
Medal record
Sailing
Representing Netherlands
European Championship
Silver medal – second place	1968 Copenhagen	Soling
Silver medal – second place	1979 La Rochelle	Soling
South American Championship
Silver medal – second place	1977 Rio de Janeiro	Soling
- Updated on 3 February 2023

Geert Alle Bakker (15 January 1921 in Appingedam – 7 August 1993 in Warmond) was a sailor from the Netherlands, who represented his country at the 1976 Summer Olympics in Kingston, Ontario, Canada. With crew Pieter Keijzer and Harald de Vlaming, Bakker took the 5th place in the Soling event. Since in 1980 the Netherlands boycotted the Moscow Olympic Games, Bakker competed under the Dutch NOC flag. He competed again in the Soling event, this time with crew Dick Coster and his son Steven Bakker. As in 1976, they took 5th place.

From 1976 to 1979, Bakker was president of the International Soling Association. After a stroke in 1983, he stayed close involved with Soling Sailing, but he confined his participation in competitions to judging.

== Controversy ==
More than 60 countries boycotted the 1980 Summer Olympics. Some countries like France did not attend because they found the competition lacking. As a result, only half of the expected fleet was present during the Olympic regattas. It was through the effort of Bakker and Ben Staartjes that the Dutch Olympic Sailing Team went to Tallinn.

Sporting positions
Preceded by (United States) Jack van Dyke	President International Soling Association; 1975–1979	Succeeded by (Australia) Ken Berkeley

== Sources ==
- "Geert Bakker Bio, Stats, and Results". Olympic Sports. Sports-Reference.com. Archived from the original on 24 December 2013.
- "Nederlandse delegatie" (in Dutch). Leeuwarder courant : hoofdblad van Friesland. 12 July 1976.
- "Olympische zeilselectie" (in Dutch). De Telegraaf. 20 May 1976.
- "Montréal 1976 Official Report, Volume I: Organization" (PDF). Ottawa: COJO. 1978. Archived from the original (PDF) on 2 February 2014.
- "Montréal 1976 Official Report, Volume II: Facilities" (PDF). Ottawa: COJO. 1978. Archived from the original (PDF) on 2 February 2014.
- "Montréal 1976 Official Report, Volume III: Results". Ottawa: COJO. 1978.
- "Schijnwerper op.... OUDSTE OLYMPIER" (in Dutch). De Telegraaf. 19 July 1976.
- "Zeilers:, We gaan'" (in Dutch). De Telegraaf. 16 May 1980.
- "Zeilploeg bleef buiten de medailles" (in Dutch). De Telegraaf. 30 July 1980.
- "Staartjes: "Het heeft niet meegezeten" Geen medailles voor Nederlandse zeilers" (in Dutch). De waarheid. 31 July 1980.
- "Franse zeilploeg blijft thuis" (in Dutch). Amigoe. 22 May 1980.
- "Games of the XXII Olympiad, Volume I: Moscow, Tallinn, Leningrad, Kiev and Minsk" (PDF). Fizkultura i Sport Publishers. 1981. Archived from the original (PDF) on 17 October 2013.
- "Games of the XXII Olympiad, Volume II: Organisation" (PDF). Fizkultura i Sport Publishers. 1981. Archived from the original (PDF) on 17 October 2013.
- "Games of the XXII Olympiad, Volume III: Participants and Results" (PDF). Fizkultura i Sport Publishers. 1981. Archived from the original (PDF) on 17 October 2013.
