= Royal Netherlands Yacht Club =

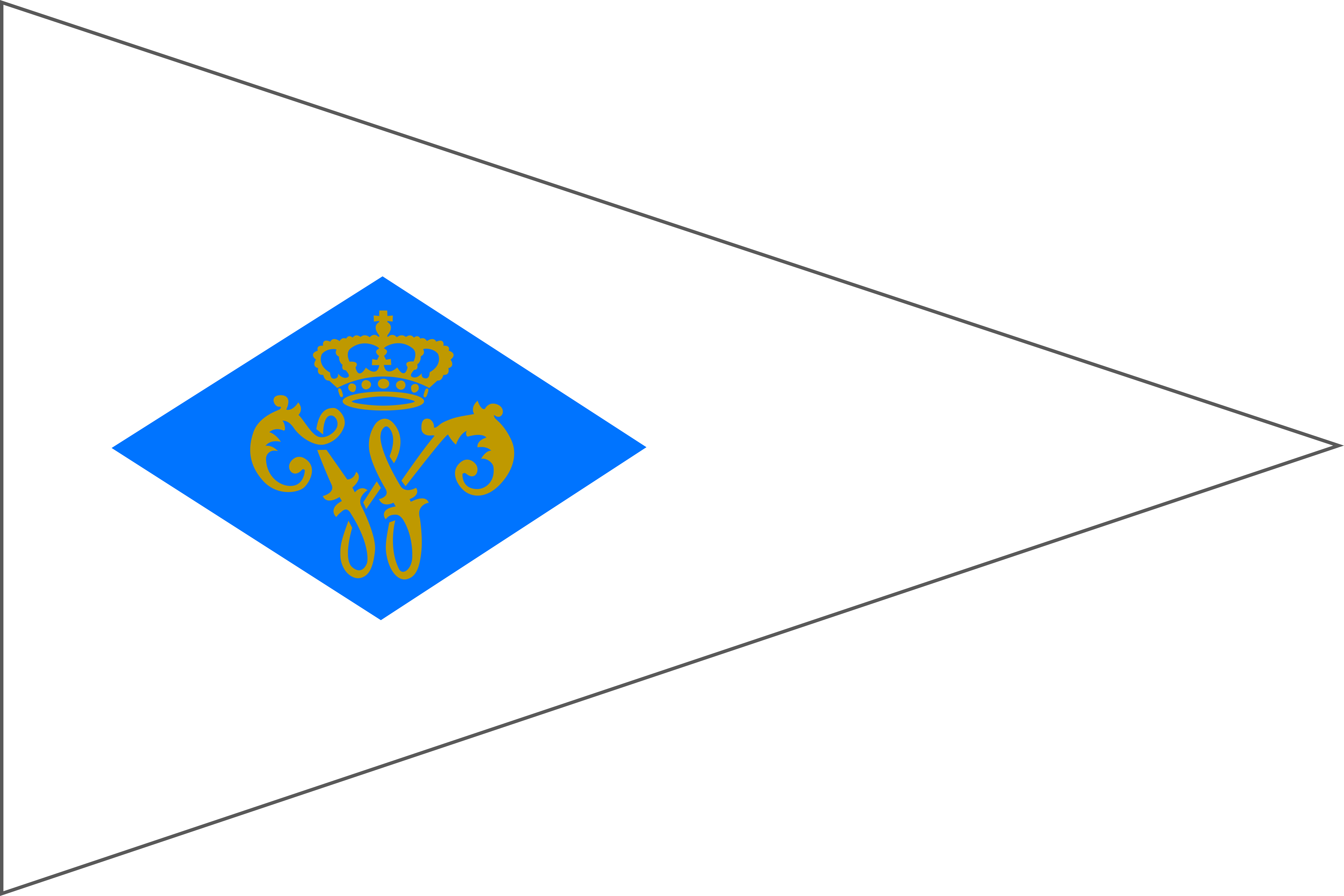
- Burgee of the KNZ&RV

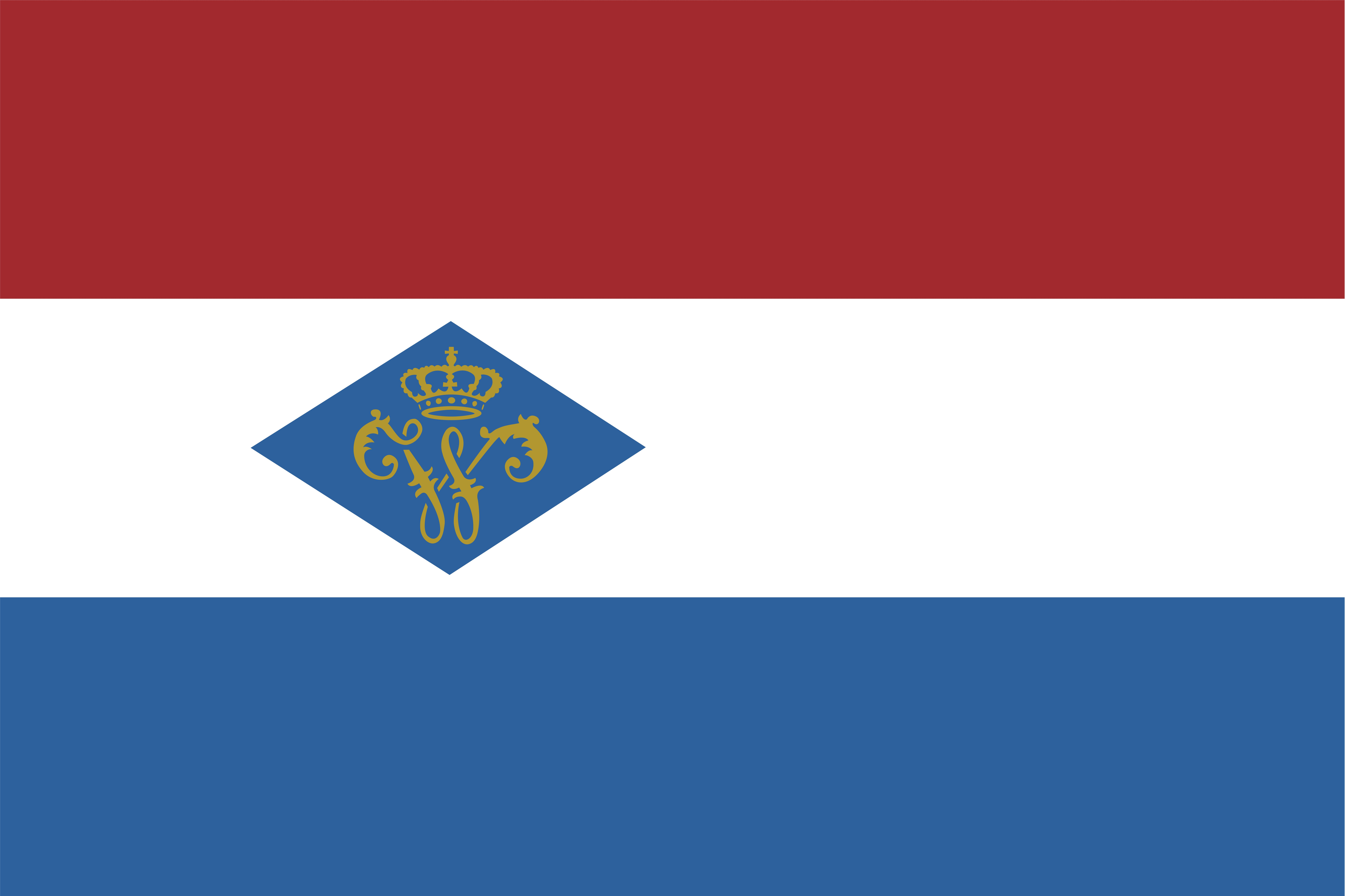
- Ensign of the KNZ&RV
- Full name: Koninklijke Nederlandsche Zeil- en Roeivereeniging
- Nickname: De Koninklijke
- Short name: KNZ&RV
- Founded: 16 December 1847; 177 years ago
- Location: Westzeedijk 7, 1398 BB Muiden
- Commodore: Michiel van Dis
- Website: http://www.knzrv.nl

The Royal Netherlands Yacht Club (Koninklijke Nederlandsche Zeil- en Roeivereeniging in the Dutch language) is a Dutch yacht club and rowing club based in Muiden. It has two marinas: in Muiden and in Enkhuizen.

The organisation was founded in 1847 and is the oldest - remaining - water sports club in the Netherlands. The KNZ&RV was one of the clubs that were founding the Royal Netherlands Watersport Association (1890) and the Royal Dutch Rowing Federation (1917).

The full, officially registered name of the organisation still retains the old spelling of the word “vereeniging” (Dutch for association, now spelled as "vereniging", with single "e"'s) with two consecutive e’s.
