= Lennart Roslund =

Swedish sailor

Medal record

Sailing

Representing Sweden

Olympic Games
| Silver medal – second place | 1972 Munich | Soling |

Lennart Roslund (born 15 February 1946) is a Swedish sailor. He won a silver medal in the Soling class at the 1972 Summer Olympics.
