= Gérard Battaglia =

Monegasque sailor (1937–2015)

Personal information
- Nationality: Monegasque
- Born: 26 March 1937
- Died: 2 March 2015 (aged 77)

Sport
- Sport: Sailing
Medal record
Representing Monaco
Mediterranean Games
Bronze medal – third place	1963 Naples	Snipe class

Gérard Battaglia (26 March 1937 – 2 March 2015) was a former sailor who represented Monaco at two Olympic Games in sailing.

== Career ==
Alongside Jean-Pierre Crovetto and Jules Soccal Battaglia finished 23rd in the Dragon class at the 1960 Olympic Games. He won a bronze medal with Crovetto at the 1963 Mediterranean Games. In the 1976 Olympic Games he finished 23rd in the soling class with Borro and Claude Rossi.

== Personal life ==
His son Philippe and nephew René Battaglia both competed for Monaco in the Olympics.

He later became president of the Monegasque Sailing Federation and an Officer of the Order of Saint-Charles.
