= Werner Christoph =

German sailor

Werner Christoph (born 13 January 1943) was an East German sailor, born in Berlin, who competed in the 1968 Summer Olympics and in the 1972 Summer Olympics.
