= Valentin Zamotaykin =

Soviet sailor

Personal information
- Full name: Valentin Alekseyevich Zamotaykin
- Nationality: Soviet Union
- Born: 27 December 1939 Partizansk
- Died: 7 October 1987 (aged 47) Moscow
- Height: 1.77 m (5.8 ft)

Sailing career
- Sport: Sailing
- Club: VS Moskva, Moskva
- Class(es): Soling; 5.5 Metre
- Updated on 2 March 2014

Valentin Alekseyevich Zamotaykin (Russian: Валентин Алексеевич Замотайкин; 27 December 1939 in Partizansk – 7 October 1987 in Moscow) was a sailor from the Soviet Union. Zamotaykin represented his country at the 1964 Summer Olympics in Enoshima. Zamotaykin took 13th place in the 5.5 Metre with Konstantin Aleksandrov (sailor) as helmsman and Konstantin Melgunov as fellow crew member. His second Olympic appearance was during the 1972 Summer Olympics in Kiel. Zamotaykin took 7th place in the Soling with Timir Pinegin as helmsman and Rais Galimov as fellow crew member. In 1976 Zamotaykin returned to the Olympics. This time with helmsmen Boris Budnikov and fellow crew member Nikolay Poliakov Zamotaykin took 4th place in Kingston again in the Soling.
