= Valdemar Bandolowski =

Danish sailor (born 1946)

Medal record

Men's sailing

Representing Denmark

Olympic Games
Gold medal – first place	1976 Montreal	Soling class
Gold medal – first place	1980 Moscow	Soling class

Valdemar Bandolowski (born 17 February 1946 in Esbønderup) is a Danish sailor and Olympic champion and former lawyer.

Together with Erik Hansen and Poul Richard Høj Jensen he won a gold medal in the Soling class at the 1976 Summer Olympics in Montreal, and again at the 1980 Summer Olympics in Moscow. At the 1972 Olympics he participated with Paul Elvstrøm, but had to withdraw due to Elvstrøm being sick.

He also won the World Cup in Soling in 1984, and the European championship in Soling in 1971.

He was a member of Dragør Sejlklub.

He was one of the initiators of Team Danmark, as a part of the kommission.

Additionally he worked some years as a lawyer in Copenhagen and as the CEO of the travel agency Bounty Club.
