= Erik Hansen (sailor) =

Danish sailor

Medal record

Men's sailing

Representing Denmark

Olympic Games
Gold medal – first place	1976 Montreal	Soling class
Gold medal – first place	1980 Moscow	Soling class

Erik Herman Hansen (born 4 June 1945 in Copenhagen, Hovedstaden) is a Danish sailor and Olympic champion.

Together with Valdemar Bandolowski and Poul Richard Høj Jensen he won a gold medal in the Soling class at the 1976 Summer Olympics in Montreal, and again at the 1980 Summer Olympics in Moscow.
