= Michael Zachries =

German sailor (1943–2021)

Personal information
- Born: 29 October 1943
- Died: 28 July 2021 (aged 77)
Medal record
Sailing
Representing East Germany
Olympic Games
Bronze medal – third place	1976 Montreal	Soling class

Michael Zachries (29 October 1943 – 28 July 2021) was a German sailor. He won a bronze medal in the Soling Class with Dieter Below and Olaf Engelhardt at the 1976 Summer Olympics in Montreal, Quebec, Canada.
