= Hubert Raudaschl =

Austrian sailor (1942–2025)

Medal record

Men's sailing

Representing Austria

Olympic Games
Silver medal – second place	1968 Mexico City	Finn class
Silver medal – second place	1980 Moscow	Star Class

Hubert Raudaschl (German pronunciation: [ˈhuːbɛʁt ˈʁaʊˌdaʃl̩]; 26 August 1942 – 26 November 2025) was an Austrian sailboat manufacturer and Olympic athlete. He participated in nine Olympic games between 1964 and 1996. Raudaschl competed in the second most Olympic Games, behind Canadian Ian Millar and tied with Soviet/Latvian Afanasijs Kuzmins.

== Biography ==
Raudaschl was born in Sankt Gilgen am Wolfgangsee on 26 August 1942. Raudaschl died in Bad Ischl on 26 November 2025, at the age of 83.

== Events ==
=== Olympics Games ===
He competed in nine Olympic Games which is the most by any athlete:

- 5th 1964 Summer Olympics – Finn - Japan
- 3rd 1968 Summer Olympics – Finn - Mexico
- 10th 1972 Summer Olympics – Tempest - Germany
- 17th 1976 Summer Olympics – Soling - Canada
- 2nd 1980 Summer Olympics – Star - Russia
- 5th 1984 Summer Olympics – Star - United States
- 13th 1988 Summer Olympics – Star - South Korea
- 20th 1992 Summer Olympics – Star - Spain
- 15th 1996 Summer Olympics – Star - United States

=== Events ===
He was a two time World Champion (in 1964 in Finn sailing, and in 1978 in Microcupper sailing) and a five time European Champion.

== See also ==
- List of athletes with the most appearances at Olympic Games

== Sources ==
- Austrian Olympic Committee (in German)
