= Barry Dunning =

British sailor

Barry Frank Dunning (born 17 March 1946) is a British sailor who competed in the 1972 Summer Olympics and in the 1976 Summer Olympics.

Dunning was elected as a Hampshire County Councillor in May 2021, representing the Conservative Party. In 2023 Dunning, was elected as a New Forest District Councillor for Lymington Town after receiving 962 votes.

Dunning defected from the Conservative Party to Reform UK in October 2025. In May 2026 Dunning lost his seat as a Hampshire County Councillor to Jack Davies (Liberal Democrats). In Lymington & Boldre Dunning received 1520 votes (23%). Davies received 3009 votes (45%).
