= Roland Schwarz (sailor) =

East German sailor (born 1937)

Roland Schwarz (born 8 April 1937) was a German sailor, born in Berlin, who competed in the 1972 Summer Olympics.
