= Fabio Albarelli =

Italian sailor (1943–1995)

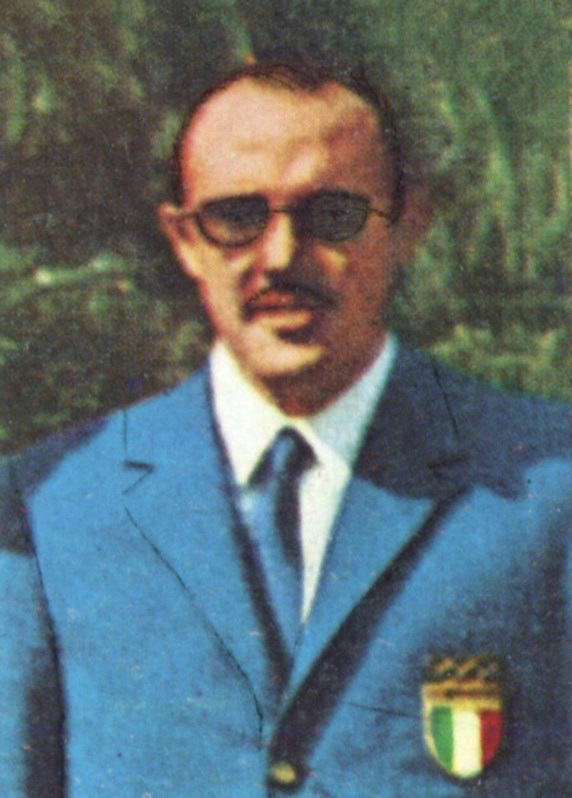
- Albarelli in 1968

Personal information
- Born: 26 June 1943 Verona, Italy
- Died: 4 October 1995 (aged 52) Venice, Italy
- Height: 1.79 m (5 ft 10 in)
- Weight: 80 kg (176 lb)

Sailing career
- Sport: Sailing
Medal record
Sailing
Representing Italy
Olympic Games
Bronze medal – third place	1968 Mexico City	Finn class

Fabio Albarelli (26 June 1943 – 4 October 1995) was an Italian competitive sailor. He won a bronze medal in the Finn class at the 1968 Summer Olympics and finished in 15th place in the Soling in 1976.
