= Wilhelm Kuhweide =

German sailor

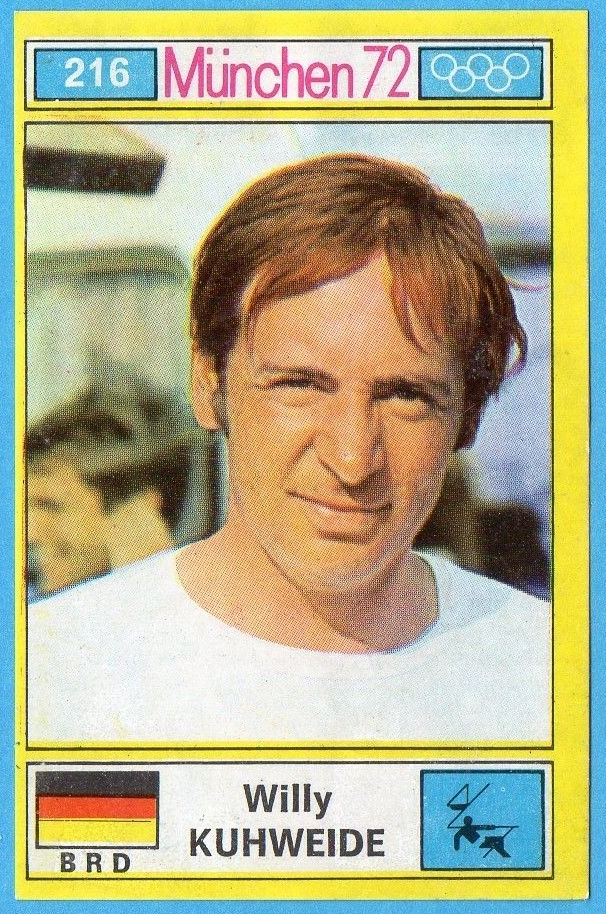
- Kuhweide in 1972

Personal information
- Born: 6 January 1943 (age 83) Berlin, Germany
- Height: 1.84 m (6 ft 1/2 in)
- Weight: 88 kg (194 lb)

Sailing career
- Sport: Sailing
- Club: Verein Seglerhaus am Wannsee
- Classes: Finn, Star, Soling
Medal record
Representing Germany
Olympic Games
| Gold medal – first place | 1964 Tokyo | Finn |
Representing West Germany
Olympic Games
| Bronze medal – third place | 1972 Munich | Star |
Finn Gold Cup
| Gold medal – first place | 1963 Medemblik | Singles |
| Gold medal – first place | 1966 La Baule | Singles |
| Gold medal – first place | 1967 Hanko | Singles |
Star World Championships
| Gold medal – first place | 1972 Caracas | Doubles |
Star European Championships
| Bronze medal – third place | 1971 Cascais | Doubles |

Wilhelm "Willi" Kuhweide (German pronunciation: [ˈvɪli ˈkuːˌvaɪ̯də]; born 6 January 1943) is a former West German sailor. He competed in one-person dinghy at the 1964 and 1968 Olympics and 1963, 1966 and 1967 world championships and won on all occasions except in 1968. He then changed to two-person and three person keelboat events and won a bronze medal at the 1972 Olympics, placing sixth-eighth in 1976 and 1984; he missed the 1980 Moscow Games due to their boycott by West Germany.
