= H-boat World Championship =

World Champions in sailing for H-Boat Class

The H-Boat World Championship is an annual international sailing regatta for H-boat, organized by the host club on behalf of the International H-Boat Class Association and recognized by World Sailing, the sports IOC recognized governing body.

== Editions ==
Host clubs of the World Championship

Event			Host			Boats	Sailors			Ref.
Ed.	Date	Year	Host club	Location	Nat.	Boats	Comp.	Nats	Cont.	Ref.
1	-	1980		Grömitz		65		7	7	
2	1–6 July	1981				71		3	3	
3	-	1982				71		6	6	
4	2–6 July	1983		Marstrand	Sweden	68	204	6	1	
5	8–15 July	1984		Hanko	Norway	61	183	7	2	
6	-	1985				70	205	7	1	
7	-	1986				69	207	9	2	
8	-	1987		Travemunde	Germany	71	213	7	1	
9	4–8 July	1988		Holbaek	Denmark	71	213	6	1	
10	-	1989				70	210	6	1	
11	-	1990				71	210	7	1	
12	-	1991				66	195	5	1	
13	-	1992				65		5	1	
14	-	1993				65	195	6	1	
15	-	1994				41	123	7	1	
16	2 - 9 Sept	1995	Segel Club Kammersee	Litzlberg	Austria	62	186	7	1	
17	-	1996				66	198	9	1	
18	-	1997				51	111	5	1	
19	-	1998				53	159	7	1	
20	-	1999				69	207	8	1	
21	5-12 Aug	2000	Nyländska Jaktklubben	Helsinki	Finland					
22	4-11 Aug	2001	Hankø Yacht Club	Hankø, Oslofjord, Østfold	Norway					
23	25-31 Aug	2002	Segelclub Ebensee	Lake Traunsee, Ebensee	Austria					
24	15-19 Sep	2003	Augsburger Segler Club	Lake Ammersee, Bavaria	Germany					
25	5-11 Sep	2004	Sejlklubben Køge Bugt	Køge Bay, Greve	Denmark					
26	3–9 July	2005	Fraglia Vela Malcesine	Lake Garda	Italy					
27	6 - 12 Aug	2006	Royal Gothenburg Yacht Club (GKSS)	Marstrand	Sweden					
28	3 - 10 Aug	2007	Segelclub Brennan	Brunnen	Switzerland					
29	2 - 8 Aug	2008		Hanko	Finland					
30	11–17 July	2009		Medemblick	Netherlands					
31	7 - 14 Aug	2010		Larvik	Norway	45	135	7	1	
32	7 - 11 Aug	2011	Neustädter Segler-Verein	Neustadt	Germany	53	165	8	2	
33	19–25 May	2012	Sailing Club Ebensee	Lake Traunsee	Austria	58	180	8	2	
34	-	2013	Thisted Yachtclub	Thisted	Denmark	65	204	7	1	
35	2 - 9 Aug	2014	Varberg Segelsalskap	Varberg	Sweden	39	127	4	1	
36	15-24 Jul	2015	Fraglia Vela Malcesine	Malcesine, Lake Garda	Italy	70		7+	1+	
37	9 - 12 Aug	2016	Helsingfors Segelklubb	Helsinki	Finland	41	129	3	1	
38	20 - 25 Aug	2017	Regattaverein Brunnen	Brunnen	Switzerland					
39	30Jul -3Aug	2018	Sandefjord Seilforening	Sandefjord, Vestfold	Norway	34	104	5	1	
40	5 - 9 Aug	2019	Royal Yacht Club Hollandia	Medemblik	Netherlands	50	137	7	1	
N/A	4–12 July	2020	Berliner Yacht Club	Schwanenwerder, Berlin	Germany	CANCELLED DUE TO COVID 19				
41	9-15 Aug	2021	Struer Sejlklub	Struer	Denmark	49	139	6	1	
42	2–10 July	2022	Warnemünder Woche	Warnemünde	Germany	47	150	4	1	
43	1-4 Aug	2023	Fraglia Vela Malcesine	Malcesine, Lake Garda	Italy	49	158	8	1	
44	11-17 Aug	2024	Segelföreningen i Björneborg (BSF)	Kallo	Finland	36	119	7	2	
45	26May -1Jun	2025	Segelclub Ebensee	Ebensee am Traunsee	Austria	69	223	9	1	
45	3-8 Aug.	2026	Stenungsunds Segelsällskap		Sweden	57	188	9	1	

== Multiple World Champions ==
Compiled from the data below the table includes up to and including 2026.

Ranking	Sailor	Gold	Silver	Bronze	Total	No. Entries	Ref.
1	Claus Hoj Jensen (DEN)	10	3	2	15	20	
2	Frederik Dahl Hansen (DEN)	9	2	2	13	15	
3	Rasmus Jørgen Andersen (DEN)	5	1	2	8	9	
4	Vincent Hoesch (GER)	4	2	3	9	16	
5	Morten Nielsen (DEN)	4	1	3	8	32	
6	Herluf Jørgensen (DEN)	3	3	2	8	20	
7	Lars Christiansen (DEN)	3	2	1	6	22	
8	Niels Henrik Borch (DEN)	3	1	2	6	25	
9	Flavio Antonio Favini (ITA)	3	1	0	4	5	
9	Nicola Bonarrigo (ITA)	3	1	0	4	5	
11	Per Kloster Hansen (DEN)	3	0	3	6	15	
12	Wolfgang Nothegger (GER)	3	0	0	3	4	

== Medalists ==
World Championship Medallists
Year	Gold	Silver	Bronze	Ref.
1980	Denmark; Poul Richard Høj Jensen; Henrik Reese; Theis Palm	Denmark; Henrik Søderlund; Gustav Anker Sørensen; Steen Nielsen	Germany; Niels Springer	
1981	Denmark; Jens Christensen; Arne Larsen; Morten Nielsen	Denmark; Poul Richard Høj Jensen; Henrik Reese; Flemming Ibsen	West Germany; Alexander Hagen; Vincent Hösch; A. Schweitzer	
1982	Austria; Harald Fereberger; Hans Frauscher; H. Gehmayer	West Germany; Horst Nebel; Tripp; Thallmair	Denmark; Jens Christensen; Arne Larsen; Herluf Jørgensen	
1983	Denmark; Poul Richard Høj Jensen; Henrik Reese; Henrik Sørensen	Denmark; Henrik Søderlund; Gustav Anker Sørensen; Steen Nielsen	Denmark; Peter Due; Ole Christensen; Sandy Goodall	
1984	Denmark; Morten Nielsen; Niels Henrik Borch; Per Kloster Hansen	Denmark; Peter Due; Niels Kjeldsen; Ole Christensen	Denmark; Tommi Krog Hansen; Jan Krog; Lars Erting	
1985	Denmark; Jens Christensen; Jens Makholm; Josef Resch	Austria; Farthofer; Holler; Holler	Denmark; Henrik Søderlund; Arne Larsen; Leo Sørensen	
1986	Denmark; Herluf Jørgensen; John N Andersen; Ole Johansen	West Germany; Gerd Eiermann; Wolfgang Brochardt; Dirk Sundermann	Denmark; Jesper Bendix; Klavs Bruun; Thomas Søndergaard	
1987	Denmark; Tommi Krog Hansen; Jan Krog; Renato Skov	Denmark; Jesper Bank; Steen Secher; Søren Olsen	Finland; Matti Rouhiainen; Jari Bremer; G. Tallberg	
1988	Denmark; Jesper Bank; Steen Secher; Søren Olsen	Denmark; Henrik Søderlund; Leo Sørensen; Finn Nikolajsen	Finland; Henrik Lundberg	
1989	Denmark; Jesper Bank; Søren Olsen; Steen Secher	West Germany; Vincent Hoesch; Dirk Stadler; Andreas Huber	Finland; Marrku Karjalainen; Jukka Karjalainen; H. Keituri	
1990	East Germany; Helmar Nauck; Michael Zacharias; Josef Resch	Denmark; Morten Nielsen; Niels Henrik Borch; Jan Krog	West Germany; Wolfgang Döring; Janne De Jong; Gerd Wichmann	
1991	Germany; Vincent Hoesch; Wolfgang Nothegger; Spiker Janka	Sweden; Henrik Edman; J. Holst; Peder Edman	Germany; Dirk Stadler; F. Piotrowski; Thomas Munk	
1992	Germany; Vincent Hoesch; Wolfgang Nothegger; Markus Daniel	Germany; Werner Fritz; Charly Zipfer; Thomas Auracher	Denmark; Theis Palm; Niels Rasmussen; Thomas Kristensen	
1993	Denmark; Christian Rasmussen; Torjus Gylstroff; Kasper Harnsberg	Germany; Vincent Hoesch; Wolfgang Nothegger; Markus Daniel	Denmark; Theis Palm; Henrik Vildenfeldt; Thomas Kristensen	
1994	Germany; Vincent Hoesch; Wolfgang Nothegger; Stefan Abel	Denmark; Theis Palm; Henrik Vildenfeldt; Thomas Kristensen	Denmark; Sten Lindberg; Henrik Sørensen; Kim Buhl	
1995	Germany; Stefan Meister; Ingo Borkowsky; Jonas Busch	Germany; Wolfgang Döring; Karsten Bredt; Sönke Busch	Switzerland; Kurt Frei; Nils Frei; Peter Rüfli	
1996	Denmark; Herluf Jørgensen; Christian Pasbjerg; Søren Nielsen	Sweden; Lars Bergenzaun; Anders lofqvist Mirek Stanczuk	Sweden; Jan Gustafson; Per Liljenberg; Hakon Olsson	
1997	Sweden; Jan Gustafson; Per Liljenberg; Håkan Ollson	Denmark; Herluf Jørgensen; Christian Pasbjerg; Søren Nielsen	Germany; Vincent Hoesch; Stefan Abel; Florian Fendt	
1998	Denmark; Bo Selko; Jonas Pedersen; Niels Sørensen	Sweden; Jan Gustafson; Per Liljenberg; Håkan Olsson	Denmark; Morten Nielsen; Jan Krog; Per Kloster Hansen	
1999	Denmark; Bo Selko; Jonas Pedersen; Niels Sørensen	Denmark; Herluf Jørgensen; Christian Pasbjerg; Carsten Pedersen	Germany; Vincent Hoesch; Fendt; Müller	
2000	Denmark; Theis Palm; Finn Nikolajsen; Lars Christiansen	Denmark; Bo Selko; Jonas Pedersen; Kenneth Bøggild	Sweden; Anders Olsson; Håkan Olsson; Peter Jønsson	
2001	Sweden; Jan Gustafson; Mats Dahlander; Olof Lundquist	Denmark; Bo Selko; Kenneth Bøggild; Michael Empacher	Norway; Ralph Wikstrøm; Svein Andreassen; John Hatch	
2002	Austria; Stefan Frauscher; Peter Heininger; Thomas Linortner	Germany; Dirk Stadler; Nils Ubert; Patrik Purin	Austria; Christian Spießberger; Thomas Lackerbauer; Manfred Schinck	
2003	Germany; Vincent Hoesch; Willi Gerlinger; Michael Lipp	Germany; Dirk Stadler; Patric Purin; Markus Funke	Germany; Wolfgang Döring; Thomas Kausen; Norbert Kausen	
2004	Denmark; Morten Nielsen; Niels Borch; Per K. Hansen	Denmark; Bo Selko; Claus Høj Jensen; Claus Rossing	Sweden; Jan Gustafson; Karl Kristensen; Lars Kristensen	
2005	Sweden; Lars Idmyr; Peter Andersson; Sebastian Christenson	Denmark; Herluf Jørgensen; Christian Pasbjerg; Lars Wegner	Denmark; Morten Nielsen; Per Kloster; Niels Henrik Borch	
2006	Denmark; Herluf Jørgensen; Christian Pasbjerg; Lars Wegner	Netherlands; Hans Peulen; Patrik Vrancken; René Heijnen	Sweden; Lars Idmyr; Peter Andersson; Sebastian Christenson	
2007	NED-86; Hans Peulen (NED); Patrik Vrancken (NED); René Heijnen (NED)	DEN-559; Steffen Stegger (DEN); Lars Christiansen (DEN); Carsten Pedersen (DEN)	DEN-565; Herluf Jörgensen (DEN); Christian Pasbjerg (DEN); Lars Wegener (DEN)	
2008	DEN-597; Claus Hoj Jensen (DEN); Henrik Olsen (DEN); Jacob Guhle (DEN)	DEN-559; Steffen Stegger (DEN); Lars Christiansen (DEN); Carsten Pedersen (DEN)	SWE-561; Jan Gustafson (SWE); Karl Kristensen (SWE); Richard Ivarsson (SWE)	
2009	DEN-559; Steffen Stegger (DEN); Lars Christiansen (DEN); Carsten Pedersen (DEN)	NOR-92; Henrik Edman (SWE); Peder Edman (SWE); Steinar Solnördal (NOR)	DEN-533; Morten Nielsen (DEN); Niels Henrik Borch (DEN); Per Kloster Hansen (DEN)	
2010	DEN-559; Steffen Stegger (DEN); Lars Christiansen (DEN); Carsten Pedersen (DEN)	SWE-600; Michael Collberg (SWE)	SWE-591; Henrik Edman (SWE)	
2011	DEN-597; Claus Høj-Jensen (DEN); Karl Kristensen (DEN); Frederik Dahl Hansen (DEN)	NED-90; Hans Peulen (NED); René Heijnen (NED); Michel Peulen (NED); Daniel Jonkmanns (NED)	SWE-591; Henrik Edman (SWE); Peder Edman (SWE); Lars Kristensen (SWE); Hannes Edman (SWE)	
2012	DEN-533; Morten Nielsen (DEN); Niels Henrik Borch (DEN); Per Kloster Hansen (DEN)	DEN-470; Mads P.G. Korsgaard (DEN); Uffe Dreiser (DEN); Anders Rydlöv (SWE)	AUT-11; Stefan Frauscher (AUT); Hans Frauscher (AUT); Peter Heininger (AUT)	
2013	DEN-597 - Good Speed; Claus Høj-Jensen (DEN); Frederik Dahl Hansen (DEN); Karl Kristiansen (DEN)	SWE-591 - Trulle; Henrik Edman (SWE); Peder Edman (SWE); Jacob Jakobsson (SWE); Hannes Edman (SWE)	DEN-559 - Østjysk Bank; Steffen Stegger (DEN); Lars Christiansen (DEN); Carsten Pedersen (DEN)	
2014	DEN-597; Claus Høj-Jensen (DEN); Frederik Dahl Hansen (DEN); Karl Kristiansen (DEN)	SWE-559; Henrik Jörhov (SWE); Jonas Palmkvist (SWE); Ida Pedersen (SWE); Bent Pedersen (SWE)	SWE-591; Henrik Edman (SWE); Peder Edman (SWE); Jacob Jacobson (SWE); Hannes Edman (SWE)	
2015	Denmark; Claus Høj Jensen; Frederik Dahl Hansen; Jacob Guhle	Sweden; Michael COLLBERG; Per ÅHLBY; Klas ANDERSSON	Denmark; Claus Hougaard	
2016	Sweden; Henrik Edman; Peder Edman; Reimina HAnsson; Bengt Pedersen	Finland; Staffan Lindberg; Thomas Hallberg; Manni Borg	Denmark; Claus Høj Jensen; Frederik Dahl Hansen; Rasmus Jørgen Andresen	
2017	NOT ENOUGH RACES SAILED			
2018	Denmark; Claus Høj Jensen; Frederik Dahl Hansen; Rasmus Jørgen Andresen	Sweden; Michael COLLBERG; Per ÅHLBY; Klas ANDERSSON	Sweden; Henrik Edman; Peder Edman; Jesper Axelson; Bengt Pedersen	
2019	Denmark; Claus Høj Jensen; Frederik Dahl Hansen; Rasmus Jørgen Andresen	Sweden; Michael COLLBERG; Per ÅHLBY; Klas ANDERSSON	Finland; Jan FORSBOM; Iiro TÖRNSTRÖM; Timo LANKINEN; Jukka Nikulainen	
2020	Cancelled due to COVID-19			
2021	DEN-597; Claus Høj-Jensen (DEN); Frederik Dahl Hansen (DEN); Rasmus Jørgen Andersen (DEN)	FIN-958; Jan Forsbom (FIN); Miikka Nikkilä (FIN); Timo Lankinen (FIN); Iiro Törnström (FIN)	DEN-586; Anders Bertelsen (DEN); Christian Schulz (DEN); Betina Jepsen (DEN); Anders Lamberg (DEN)	
2022	DEN-597 - Good Speed; Claus Høj-Jensen (DEN); Frederik Dahl Hansen (DEN); Rasmus Jørgen Andersen (DEN)	DEN-586 - Andersine; Anders Bertelsen (DEN); Christian Schulz (DEN); Betina Jepsen (DEN); Morten Kofoged (DEN)	GER-1721; Thomas Kausen (GER); Jani Funk (GER); Franzi Funk (GER); Alexander Eilhardt (GER)	
2023	DEN-597 - GOOD SPEED; Claus Høj-Jensen (DEN); Frederik Dahl Hansen (DEN); Rasmus Jørgen Andersen (DEN)	ITA 555 - LA MARZOCCO FINEST ESPRESSO MACHINES; Flavio Favini (ITA); Tiziano Nava (ITA); Guido Bernardinelli (ITA); Nicola Bonarrigo (ITA)	DEN-586 - COSANI/ANDERSINE; Anders Bertelsen (DEN); Christian Schulz (DEN); Betina Jepsen (DEN); Morten Kofoged (DEN)	
2024	ITA 555 - FLED 2 - Slam - Columbia Transport - La Marzocc; Flavio Favini (ITA); Guido Antonio Bernardinelli (ITA); Nicola Bonarrigo (ITA); Stefano Rizzi (ITA)	DEN-586 - Andersine - COSANI / Sparekassen Danmark / FinnLines; Anders Bertelsen (DEN); Christian Schulz (DEN); Betina Jepsen (DEN); Morten Kofoged (DEN)	DEN-597 - Good Speed; Claus Høj-Jensen (DEN); Frederik Dahl Hansen (DEN); Rasmus Jørgen Andresen (DEN)	
2025	ITA 555; Flavio Favini (ITA); Simona Hoellermann (AUT); Stefano Rizzi (ITA); Nicola Bonarrigo (ITA)	DEN 597; Claus Høj-Jensen (DEN); Frederik Dahl Hansen (DEN); Rasmus Jørgen Andresen (DEN)	GER 1021; Finn Kenter (GER); Philipp Frieß (GER); Gian-Andrea Hehli (SUI); Merlin Gnutzmann (GER)	
2026	ITA 555 - FLED 2 Flavio Favini (ITA); Guido Antonio Bernardinelli (ITA); Stefano Rizzi (ITA); Nicola Bonarrigo (ITA)	DEN 597 - Good Speed; Claus Høj-Jensen (DEN); Frederik Dahl Hansen (DEN); Frederik Gersdorff Korsgaard (DEN)	GER 1010 - Amigo; Holger Köhne (GER); Jan Köhne (GER); Sven Ulrich (GER)	
