= Poul Richard Høj Jensen =

Danish sailor

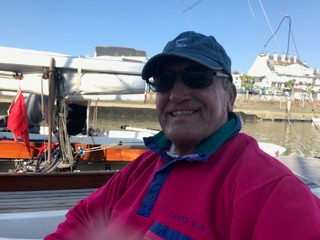
- Born: 2 June 1944 (age 82); Copenhagen, Denmark
- Occupations: Retired: Sailmaker; Boatbuilder
- Known for: (Olympic) yachtsman, Sailmaker & Boatbuilder. Høj Jensen won more than 125 major yachting titles. This includes Olympic, International and national championships in different sailing classes.
- Height: 1.83 m (6.0 ft)
- Spouses: Birthe Rasmussen; Sophia
- Children: Pia, Claus, Adrian and Justin (the latter two step); Grandchildren: Mie, Mathias, Bella, Rommey, Harry, Tom and Rosie.
- Father: C. J. Høj Jensen
- Awards: Knighted by the Queen of Denmark in 6-April-2000 (Ridder af Dannebrogordenen).; German Dragon Class, Gold Dragon presented by Queen Silvia of Sweden 15 July 2009.; KDY 1976 Sportsman of the year Scandinavia; RYS Yachtsman of the year 2009.; Honorable Member Danish Dragon Club since 10-October-2014.

Poul Richard Høj Jensen
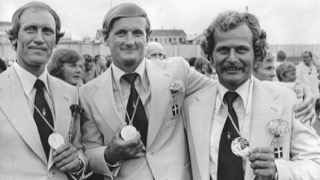
- The picture shows (From left to right) Poul Richard Høj Jensen (Helmsman), Valdemar Bandolovski and Erik Hansen just after the 1976 medal ceremony.

Sailing career
- Sport: Sailing
- Club: Royal Yacht Squadron; Royal Danish Yacht Club; Royal Corinthian Yacht Club; Antigua Yacht Club
- Classes: Among many others: Olympic classes; Finn; Flying Dutchman; Soling; Dragon; International classes; OK; Etchells; H-boat; Quarter Ton
Medal record
Sailing
Representing Denmark International Olympic Committee United Kingdom
Olympic Games
Gold medal – first place	1976 Montreal	Soling
Gold medal – first place	1980 Moscow	Soling
World Championships
Gold medal – first place	1989 Torbay	Dragon
Gold medal – first place	2009 Medemblik	Dragon
Silver medal – second place	1973 Quiberon	Soling
Silver medal – second place	1979 Visby	Soling
Silver medal – second place	1993 Travemünde	Dragon
Silver medal – second place	1995 Perth	Dragon
Silver medal – second place	1997	Dragon
European Championships
Gold medal – first place	1982	Soling
Gold medal – first place	1988	Dragon
Gold medal – first place	1992	Dragon
Gold medal – first place	1996	Dragon
Gold medal – first place	2000	Dragon
Silver medal – second place	1976 Geneva	Soling
Silver medal – second place	2005 La Trinité-sur-Mer	Dragon
Bronze medal – third place	1980 Helsinki	Soling
Dragon Gold Cup
Gold medal – first place	1990 Dublin	Dragon
Gold medal – first place	1992 Ostend	Dragon
Gold medal – first place	1994 Rungsted	Dragon
Gold medal – first place	1997 Dublin	Dragon
Gold medal – first place	2008 Cascais	Dragon
- Updated on 18 June 2018

Poul Richard Høj Jensen "PRHJ" (born 2 June 1944) is a Danish sailor, boatbuilder, sailmaker and Olympic champion. Høj Jensen lives with his wife Sophia alternating in Burnham-on-Crouch and Freetown, Antigua and Barbuda.

== Personal life ==
Married with two children, two step children; seven grand children to date. Trained in mechanical engineering.

== Professional career ==
After completing National Service in the Danish Navy, Høj Jensen worked for Paul Elvstrøm and Hans Fogh in the sail, mast and boatbuilding business. Left the company 15 years later to set up sail making business with Hans Fogh and subsequently started his own Company "Høj Jensen Design" which became the North Sails Scandinavia franchise. In 1989 the sailmaking business merged with Petticrows in Burnham-on-Crouch, UK, and he concentrated on building One Design Boats; Dragons mainly. As Høj Jensen was involved in the nautical business, he was for many years formally (rules of International Olympic Committee & World Sailing) considered a professional sailor. However he was he never paid to sail, he also worked during his four Olympic Campaigns with little or no sponsorship. Høj Jensen considers himself to be a gifted amateur.

== Olympics ==
Høj Jensen participated in four consecutive Olympics from 1968. Together with Erik Hansen and Valdemar Bandolowski he won a gold medal in the Soling class at the 1976 Summer Olympics in Montreal, and again at the 1980 Summer Olympics in Moscow.

== Palmarès ==
The Palmarès of Høj Jensen is extensive. Therefore, the following criteria are used (with the exception of the Olympics where all results are listed):

- International championships with 45 boats or more
- National (country) championships as sanctioned by National Authorities.
- World, European Championships and Gold Cups as sanctioned by World Sailing.
- Only first places are noted, except for World, European and Championships where some 2nd and 3rd places are included.

Honours

Knighted by the Queen of Denmark in 2001.
German Dragon Class, Gold Dragon presented by Queen Silvia of Sweden 15 July 2009.
KDY 1976 Sportsman of the year Scandinavia
RYS Yachtsman of the year 2009.
Honorable Member Danish Dragon Club.

Olympic Games

7th, 1968 Olympics, Acapulco, Mexico – FD (Where he replaced Hans Fogh in race 7). With Niels Jensen.
7th, 1972 Olympics, Kiel–Schilksee, West Germany – Dragon. With Frank Høj Jensen and Gunner Dahlgaard.
Gold, 1976 Olympics, Kingston, Canada – Soling. With Erik Hansen and Valdemar Bandolowski.
Gold, 1980 Olympics, Tallinn, Soviet Union – Soling. With Erik Hansen and Valdemar Bandolowski.

World Championships

- Half Ton
  - 1st, 1972 Sweden. With Paul Elvstrøm (helm), Strit Johanssen, Valdemar Bandolowski, Jan Kjærulff
- Quarter Ton
  - 1st, 1987. With Bent Folke Larsen, Steen Larsen and Erik Lund
  - 1st, 1988. With Bent Folke Larsen, Steen Larsen and Theis Palm
  - 2nd, 1986. With Bent Folke Larsen, Steen Larsen and Theis Palm
  - Etchells
  - 1st, 1997 Hong Kong. With Paul Blowers and Steve Mitchell
  - 3rd, 2001 United Kingdom. With Paul Blowers and Steve Mitchell
- Dragon
  - 1st, 1989 United Kingdom. With Erik Hansen, Jan Persson
  - 1st, 2009 Netherlands, Medemblik. With Theis Palm, Lars Jensen
  - 2nd, 1993 Germany. With Theis Palm, Lars Jensen
  - 2nd, 1995 Australia, Perth. With Claus Høj Jensen, Richie Goldsmith
  - 2nd, 1997 Sweden, Marstrand
  - 3rd, 1985 France, Douarnenez
- H-Boat
  - 1st, 1980 West Germany. With Henrik Reese and Theis Palm
  - 1st, 1983 Sweden. With Henrik Reese and Henrik Montin Sorenson
  - 2nd, 1981. With Henrik Reese and Theis Palm
- Soling
  - 2nd, 1973 France
  - 2nd, 1979 Sweden

Master World Championships

- Etchells
  - 1st, 2001 United Kingdom, Lymington. With Paul Blowers and Steve Mitchell

Corinthian World Championships

- Dragon
  - 1st, 2013 United Kingdom, Weymouth. With Hamish McKay and Andrew Norden

European Championships

- 6 Metre
  - 2nd Classic Division, 2016 Switzerland, Brunnen. With Colin Murray, Alexea Barrier, Hamish McKay and Jana Zimmerhalk
- Etchells
  - 1st, 1997 Italy, Lake Garda. With Paul Blowers and Steve Mitchell
  - 1st, 1999 France, Douarnenez. With Paul Blowers and Steve Mitchell
- Dragon
  - 1st, 1969 Switzerland, Lake Thun. With Axel Holm (helm)
  - 1st, 1988 Denmark, Skovshoved. With Erik Hansen and Finn Jorgenson
  - 1st, 1992 Finland, Hanko. With Ebbe Elmer and Carsten Errebo
  - 1st, 1996 United Kingdom, Pwllheli. With Morton Nielson and Chris Brittain
  - 1st, 2000 Spain, Laredo. With Claus Høj Jensen and Morteon Harmson
  - 2nd, 1994 France, Cazaux. With Claus Høj Jensen and Hamish McKay
  - 2nd, 2005 France, La Trinité-sur-Mer. With Phillipe Skate Holm and Chris Brittain
  - 3rd, 1987 Finland, Helsinki. With Prince Henrik (helm) and Jacob Johanssen
- H-Boat
  - 1st, 1978. With Henrik Reese and Flemming Ipsen
  - 1st, 1979
- Soling
  - 1st, 1982 Denmark, Dragør. With Hans Fogh (helm) and John Kerr

Gold Cups

- Dragon
  - 1st, 1990 Ireland, Dublin. With Erik Hansen
  - 1st, 1992 Belgium, Ostend
  - 1st, 1994 Denmark, Rungsted
  - 1st, 1997 Ireland, Dublin. With Hamish McKay and Chris Britten
  - 1st, 2008 Portugal, Cascais. With Theis Palm and Andrew Norden

Corinthian Dragon Gold Cups

- 1st, 2014 Netherlands, Medemblik. With Hamish McKay and Andrew Norden

Asia Pacific Championships Etchells

- 1st, 1995 Hong Kong. With Claus Høj Jensen and Nick Geaves

One Ton Cup

- 1st, 1990 Sweden, Marstrand. With Henrik Søderlund (skipper)

Nordic Championships

- IF-Boat (previously International Folkboat)
  - 1st, 1975
- Soling
  - 1st, 1981. With Theis Palm and Lille Keld Christensen
- H-Boat
  - 1st, 1977. With Henrik Reese and Flemming Ipsen
  - 1st, 1978
  - 1st, 1982
- Dragon
  - 1st, 1972
  - 1st, 1991 Norway, Ålesund. With Steen Larson and Jan Eld
- Star
  - 2nd, 1982
- Finn
  - 2nd, 1968

National Championships

- Antigua and Barbuda Antigua and Barbuda
  - 2008, 2009, Dragon
- Danish Denmark
  - 1972, Trapeze
  - 1976, Spackhugger
  - 1973, 1979, 1980, 1982, Soling
  - 1977, 1978, 1980, 1981, 1985, H-Boat
  - 1963, 1966, 1968, OK dinghy
  - 1987, 1988, 1991, Dragon
- Egypt Egypt
  - 1998, Dragon
- Finland Finland
  - 1980, H-Boat
- France France
  - 1991, 1995, 1997, Dragon
- German Germany
  - 1984, H-Boat
  - 1992, 1994, 1995, Dragon
- Great Britain United Kingdom
  - 1998, 1995, Etchells
  - 1993, 1996, 2002, 2005, 2006, Dragon
- Italy Italy
  - 1999, Etchells
- Ireland Ireland
  - 1970, 1993, 1994, 1998, 1999, 2000, 2002, 2004, 2012, Dragon
- Japan Japan
  - 1986, Half Ton
  - 1992, Dragon Prince Henrik (helm)
- The Netherlands Netherlands
  - 1997, 2001, 2011, Dragon
- Russia Russia
  - 1994, 2000, Dragon
- Sweden Sweden
  - 1992, Dragon

Other major regattas per class

- 115' Bruce Farr ketch
  - 2011, Nelson Trophy
- Dragon
  - 1969, 2003, 2008, 2012, Princess Sophia, Spain, Mallorca
  - 1972, 1999, Kiel Week, Germany
  - 1991, 1992, 2001, 2003, Regatte Royale, France, Cannes
  - 1995, 1996, 1997, Grand Prix Samsonite, Spain, Blanes
  - 1995, 1998, 2005, 2006, 2007, Henrique Navigator, Portugal, Vilamoura/Lisboa
  - 1999, Cowes Week, UK
  - 2000, 2011, 2012, La Baule Derby, France
  - 2001, Baltic Regatta
  - 2001, 2002, Copa Mediterania Mallorca, Spain
  - 2002, 2004, Grand Prix Douarnenez, France
  - 2002, Drags Cup Cazaux
  - 2005, 2006, King Juan Carlos Cup
  - 2006, Iberian Championship
- H-Boat
  - 1978, 1979, Kieler Woche, Germany
- Soling
  - 1976, Ski Yachting, France, Cannes
  - 1980, Kieler Woche, Germany

Other Races Special for Høj Jensen

- Sjaelland Rundt
  - 1963, Overall winner in Paul Elvstrøm's "Bess"
  - 1965, 1st. With his father C. J. Høj Jensen, his brother Frank Høj Jensen and Ussing Andersen
Honours of Poul Richard Høj Jensen
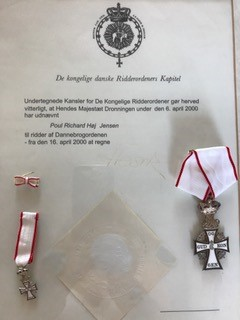
Picture of the original proclamation and medals of Høj Jensen Order of the Dannebrog

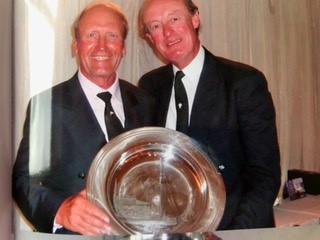
Picture of the Yachtsman of the year 2009 award giving ceremony by Brigadier Tony Singer of the RYS

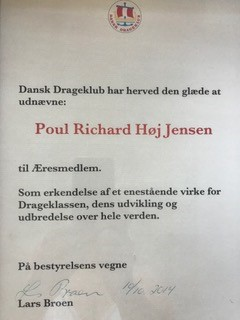
Certificate of the Danish Dragon Club

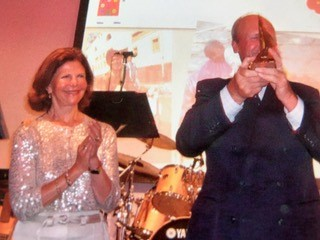
German Dragon Class, Gold Dragon presented by Queen Silvia of Sweden 15 July 2009.

== See also ==
- List of Olympic medalists in sailing
