= IMOCA 60 No Way Back =

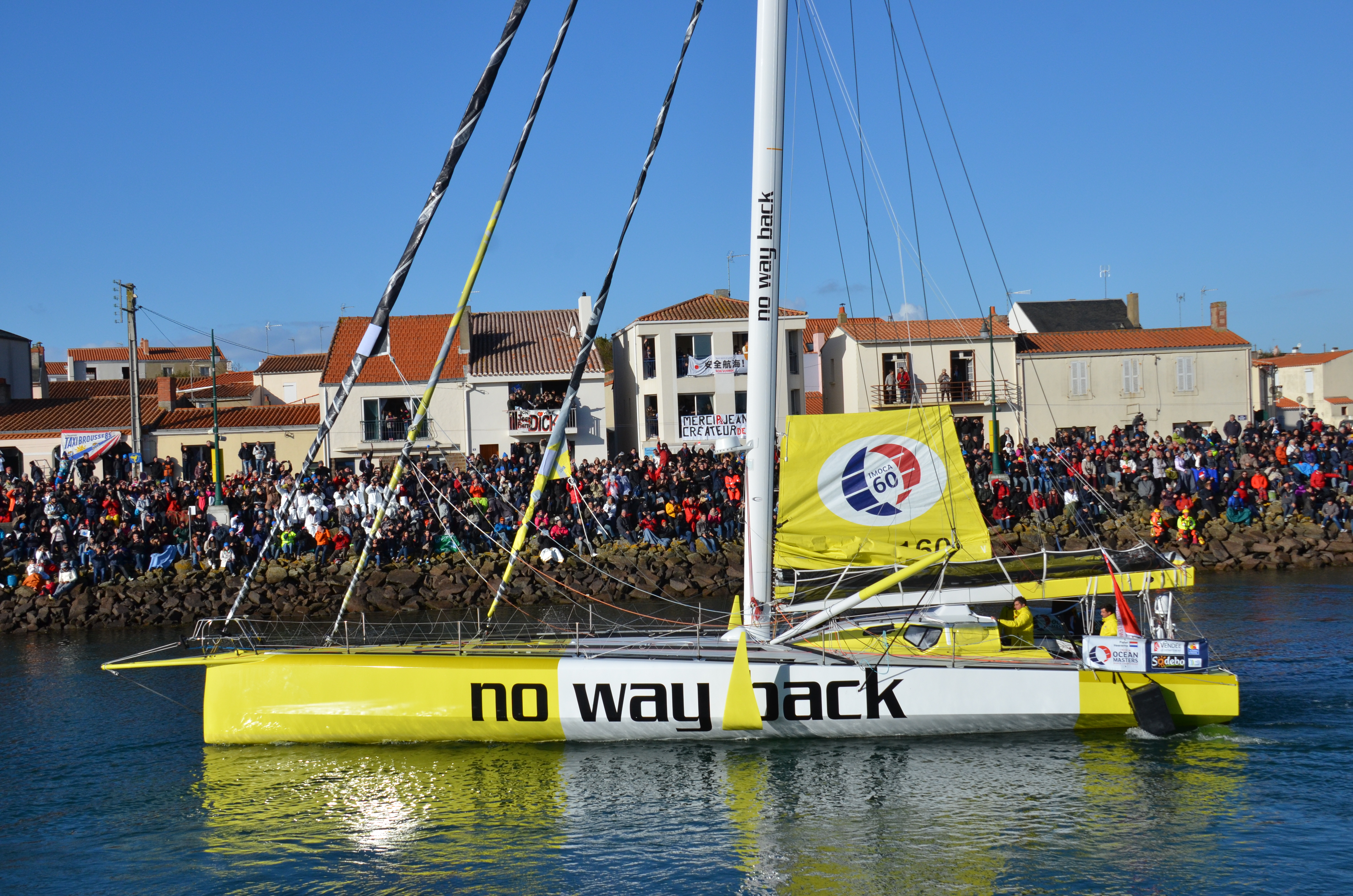

Development
- Designer: VPLP Design, Guillaume Verdier Design Office, Guillaume Verdier
- Year: 18 August 2015

Racing
- Class association: IMOCA 60

The IMOCA 60 class yacht No Way Back, NED 160 was designed by VPLP design and Guillaume Verdier and launched on 18 August 2015 after being built Persico in Italy. The boat had structural issues during the 2022 Route de Rhum when the ballast tanks demounted themselves. This while retiring from the race the previous day and heading back towards Portugal led to an onboard fire and the boat was lost.

== Racing results ==
Pos	Year	Race	Class	Boat name	Skipper	Notes	Ref
Round the world races
DNF / 33	2021	2020–2021 Vendée Globe	IMOCA 60	Newrest – Art & Fenêtres	Fabrice Amedeo (FRA)	General computer failure, diverted to and retired unaided to Cape Town	
17 / 29	2017	2016–2017 Vendée Globe	IMOCA 60	No Way Back	Pieter Heerema (NED)	116d 09h 24m 12s	
Transatlantic Races
Sank	2022	Route du Rhum	IMOCA 60	Nexans-Art & Fenêtres, FRA 56	Fabrice Amedeo (FRA)		
10 / 22	2021	Transat Jacques Vabre	IMOCA 60	Nexans - Arts & Fenêtres, FRA	Fabrice Amedeo (FRA); Loïs Berrehar (FRA)	21d 03h 44m	
9 / 29	2019	Transat Jacques Vabre	IMOCA 60	Newrest - Arts & Fenêtres, FRA 56	Fabrice Amedeo (FRA); Eric Peron (FRA)	14d 16h 01m	
12 / 20	2018	Route du Rhum	IMOCA 60	Newrest - Arts & Fenêtres, FRA 56	Fabrice Amedeo (FRA)	20d 20h 09m	
Other Races
9 / 20	2019	Rolex Fastnet Race	IMOCA 60	Newrest - Arts & Fenêtres, FRA 56	Fabrice Amedeo (FRA); Eric Peron (FRA) + Crew	2d 05h 07m	

== Timeline ==
=== Vento di Sardegna (2015) ===
The boat was originally commissioned by Italian skipper Andrea Mura however he lost his sponsor and had to sell the boat before it was completed.

=== No Way Back (2016-2017) ===
On 3 February 2016 it was announced Pieter Heerema has brought the boat to compete in the 2016-2017 Vendée Globe un the name No Way Back, NED 160

=== Newrest-Art & Fenêtres (2017-2021) ===
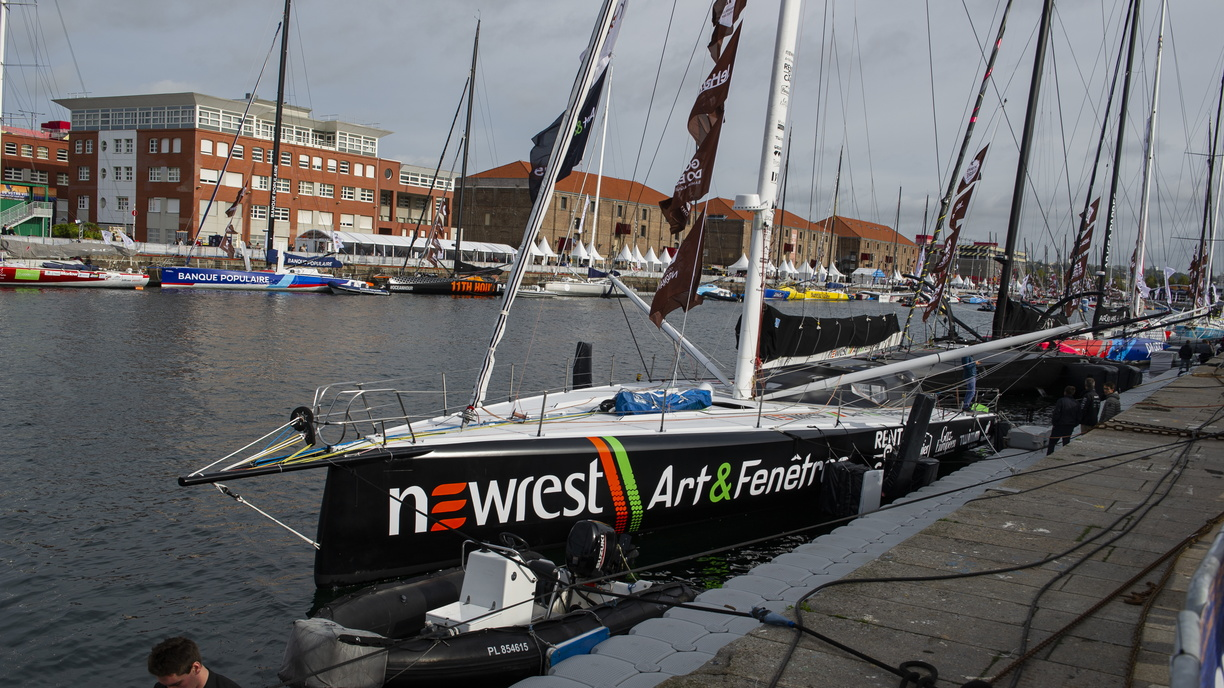
IMOCA 60

=== Nexans-Art & Fenêtres (2021-2022) ===
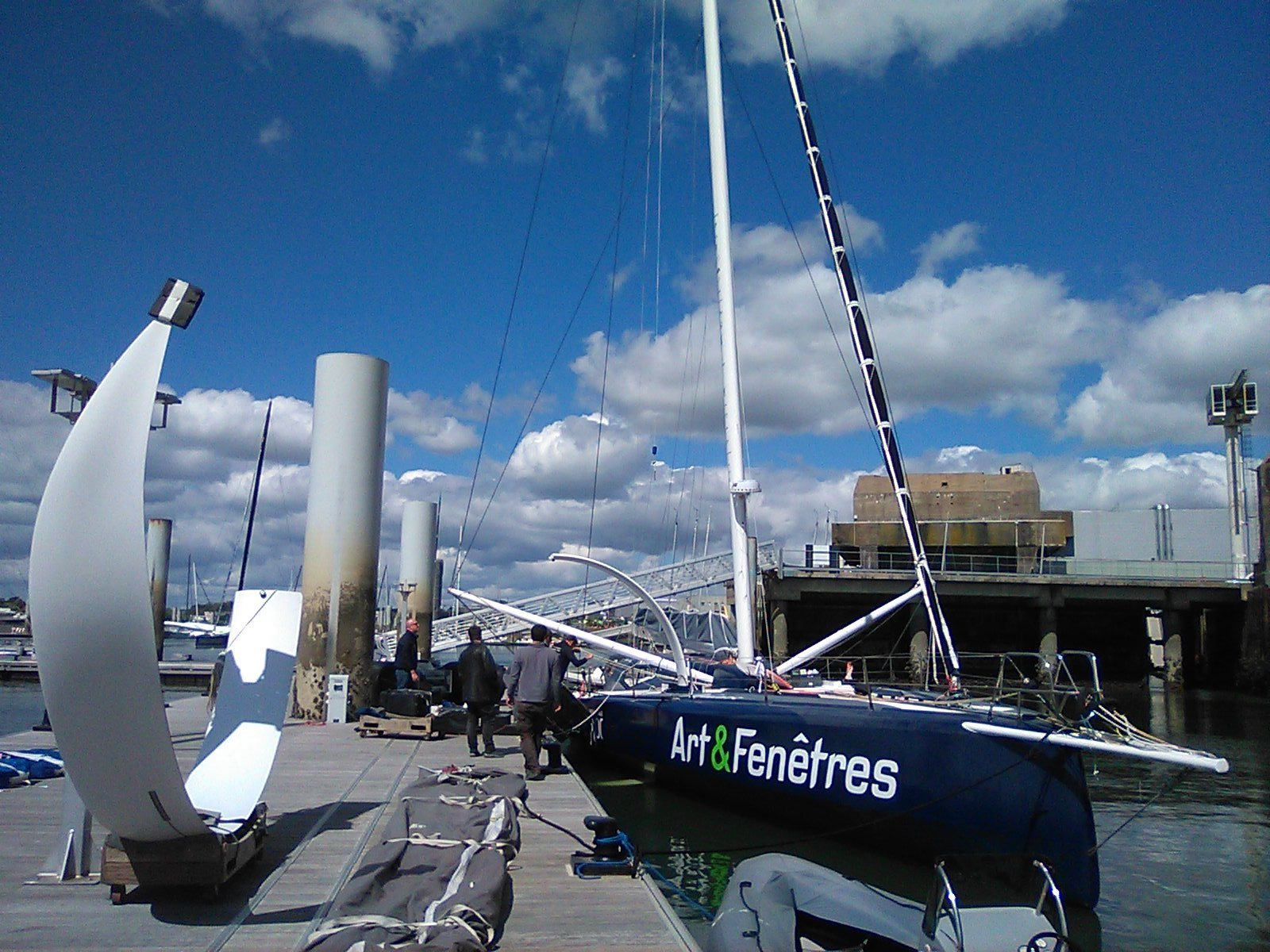
IMOCA 60
