= Nordic Folkboat Gold Cup =

Gold Cup locations 1963-2013

The Nordic Folkboat Gold Cup is a sailing race in Nordic Folkboat held annually in Sweden, Denmark, Finland, or Germany. The cup is subject for competition between yacht clubs competed in regular fleet racing style with individual crew. If any yacht club manages to win the cup for six times, the club wins it to keep it forever. It has been conquered forever three times, by Kjøbenhavns Amatør-Sejlklub in 1974 and by Kerteminde Sejlklub in 1982 and 1994. Luckily both yacht clubs have donated the cup back to continue the tradition of the prestigious cup. With the lack of a World Championships, the Gold Cup is the most prestigious event in the class.

The yacht club with the most inscriptions is Kerteminde Sejlklub, with 17, and most individual wins have Danish Erik Andreasen, with 6. Danish crew have won 42 times, German crew have won 9 times, and Swedish crew have won once. The highest number of participants was in 1984, when 96 crew participated (of which eight from the United States).

The upcoming editions will be held in Warnemünde in 2015, Helsinki 2016, Kerteminde 2017.

== History ==
The first cup was set up 1963 by the senator Alfred Hagelstein of Lübeck. In the beginning races were held in Lübeck-Travemünde area or in Denmark and the first yacht club to reach six wins would keep the cup.

In 1978 the first race was held in Sweden, and in 2016 the first race will be held in Finland.

== Editions ==
Year	Gold	Silver	Bronze
1963 Travemünde	Daddel, Kieler Yacht-Club (FRG); Bruno Splieth; Heinrich Dahlinger; Frieder Heinzel		Tine (DEN)
1964 Copenhagen	Tine, Taarbæk Sejlklub (DEN); Peter Michael Larsen; Poul Jensen; Michael Lauersen		
1965 Copenhagen	Miki IV, Skovshoved Sejlklub (DEN); Sven Mik-Meyer; Jørgen Mik-Meyer; Poul Mik-Meyer		
1966 Copenhagen	Tine, Taarbæk Sejlklub (DEN); Peter Michael Larsen; Poul Jensen; Michael Lauersen		
1967 Travemünde	Helle, Kjøbenhavns Amatør-Sejlklub (DEN); Claus Hjorth; Ove Hjorth; Karsten Ask		
1968 Fredericia	Helle, Kjøbenhavns Amatør-Sejlklub (DEN); Claus Hjorth; Ove Hjorth; Karsten Ask		
1969 Travemünde	Helle, Kjøbenhavns Amatør-Sejlklub (DEN); Claus Hjorth; Ove Hjorth; Karsten Ask		
1970 Travemünde	Helle, Kjøbenhavns Amatør-Sejlklub (DEN); Claus Hjorth; Ove Hjorth; Karsten Ask		
1971 Travemünde	Helle, Kjøbenhavns Amatør-Sejlklub (DEN); Claus Hjorth; Ove Hjorth; Karsten Ask		
1972 Horsens	Solita, Kerteminde Sejlklub (DEN); Knud Andreasen; John Christensen; Frits Busch		
1973 Travemünde	Sol-lie, Flensburger Segel-Club (FRG); Andreas Christiansen; Knud Christiansen; Andreas St. Christiansen		
1974 Kiel	Nup, Kjøbenhavns Amatør-Sejlklub (DEN); Flemming Hansen; Per Christensen; Niels Jørgen Jensen		
1975 Kerteminde	Tibbe, Kerteminde Sejlklub (DEN); Erik Andreasen; Jørgen Knudsen; Christen Kold		
1976 Copenhagen	Tibbe, Kerteminde Sejlklub (DEN); Erik Andreasen; Jørgen Knudsen; Poul Ankjær		
1977 Kiel	Nup, Kjøbenhavns Amatør-Sejlklub (DEN); Flemming Hansen; Niels Andersen; Bent Christensen		
1978 Malmö	Skruff, Sölvesborgs Segelsällskap (SWE); Peter Sohl; Per-Arne Johansson; Anders Nilsson		
1979 Snaptun	Solita, Kerteminde Sejlklub (DEN); Knud Andreasen; Frits Busch; Kim Larsen		
1980 Kiel	Wood-y, Kerteminde Sejlklub (DEN); Henrik Kold; Sandeep Sander; Flemming Kold		
1981 Kerteminde	Tibbe Tit, Kerteminde Sejlklub (DEN); Erik Andreasen; Jørn Knudsen; Carl Ove Dydensborg		
1982 Simrishamn	Solita, Kerteminde Sejlklub (DEN); Knud Andreasen; Henrik Kold; Eddy Unglaub		
1983 Kerteminde	Kristine, Roskilde Sejlklub (DEN); Henrik Sørensen; John Skjoldby Petersen; Carsten Rye Hansen		
1984 Flensburg	Mareike, Segelclub Eckernförde (FRG); Horst Dittrich; Hartvig Sulkiewiez; Peter Lehr		
1985 Kalø Vig	Swallow, Egå Sejlklub (DEN); Torben Olesen; Jan Marcussen; Morten F. Jensen		
1986 Eckernförde	Kaos, Gråsten Sejlklub (DEN); Kaj Funder Nielsen; Ib Funder Nielsen; Lars B. Poulsen		
1987 Lynæs	Sagitta, Schlei-Segel-Club (FRG); Walter Muhs; Norbert Jürgensen; Hans-Jorgen Duggen		
1988 Kiel	Daddys Girl, Kerteminde Sejlklub (DEN); Christen Kold; Jens Kold; Mogens Finks		
1989 Egå	Tenny, Kerteminde Sejlklub (DEN); Henrik Kold; Tenna Pedersen; Benny Pedersen		
1990 Travemünde	Lord Jim, Kieler Yacht-Club (FRG); Horst Schultze; Peter Przywarra; Karl Rath		
1991 Aabenraa	Chess, Kerteminde Sejlklub (DEN); Henrik Kold; Søren Hansen; Jan Braarup		
1992 Kiel	Voila, Kerteminde Sejlklub (DEN); Erik Andreasen; Lotte Andreasen; Poul Ankjær		
1993 Kerteminde	Chess, Kerteminde Sejlklub (DEN); Henrik Kold; Fleming Kold; Jan Braarup		
1994 Malmö	Voila, Kerteminde Sejlklub (DEN); Erik Andreasen; Lotte Andreasen; Poul Ankjær		
1995 Warnemünde	Arosia, Fredericia Sejlklub (DEN); Jesper Bendix; Jacob Grønbech; Jesper Baungaard		
1996 Rudkøbing	Chess, Kerteminde Sejlklub (DEN); Henrik Kold; Claus Schou Nielsen; Anders Wibung		
1997 Thisted	Team, Egå Sejlklub (DEN); Peter Due; Morgens Pedersen; Kurt M. Petersen		
1998 Travemünde	Marquisen, Egå Sejlklub (DEN); Torben Olesen; Lars Dahlbøge; Palle Hemdorrf	Germany; Andreas Christiansen	Germany; Ralf Hofer
1999 Årøsund	Amadeus, Haderslev Sejl-Club (DEN); Theis Palm; Svend Nielsen; Søren Nielsen	Marianne, Fredericia Sejlklub (DEN); Jesper Bendix	Sol-lie, Flensburger Segel-Club (GER); Andreas Christiansen
2000 Eckernförde	Ylva, Kieler Yacht-Club (GER); Ulf Kipcke; Dieter Kipcke; Gero Martens	Kerteminde Sejlklub (DEN); Knud Andreasen; Marie-Louise Andreasen; Kurt Lange	Kerteminde Sejlklub (DEN); Erik Andreasen; Lotte Andreasen; Poul Ankjær Jensen
2001 Halmstad	Liselotte, Kerteminde Sejlklub (DEN); Erik Andreasen; Lotte Andreasen; Kurt Lange	Kerteminde Sejlklub (DEN); Knud Andreasen	Kastrup Sejlklub (DEN); John Wulff
2002 Fredericia	Joker, Kolding Sejlklub (DEN); Per Jørgensen; Lars Jørgensen; Kjeld Hansen	Astrea (DEN); Preben Kristensen	Madonna (DEN); Heines Nielsen
2003 Aabenraa	Can-Can, Thisted Sejlklub (DEN); Per Hovmark; Søren Bredal; Claus Lauritsen	Stampe, Kolding Sejlklub (DEN); Christian Thomsen; Henrik Holk; Torben Lissau	Cirkeline, Sundby Sejlforening (DEN); Tom Carlsen; Søren Ejsenhardt; Palle Wulf Larsen
2004 Niendorf an der Ostsee	Can-Can, Thisted Sejlklub (DEN); Per Hovmark; Søren Bredal; Claus Lauritsen	Le redutable, Seglervereinigung 1903 Berlin (GER); Cristoph Nielsen; Torben Dehn; Rolf Lange	Madonna, Kolding Sejlklub (DEN); Heines Nielsen; Erik Madsen; Hans Henrichsen
2005 Malmö	Can-Can, Thisted Sejlklub (DEN); Per Hovmark; Søren Bredal; Claus Lauritsen	Tibbetit, Sundby Sejlforening (DEN); Brian Frisendahl; Jan Knudsen; Henrik Green	Blåt t Lyst, Kerteminde Sejlklub (DEN); Erik Andreasen; Erik Køster; Mogens Pedersen
2006 Bogense	Geppelin, Kerteminde Sejlklub (DEN); Per Buch; Hans Schultz; Per Puck	Can-Can, Thisted Sejlklub (DEN); Per Hovmark	Stampe, Kolding Sejlklub (DEN); Christian Thomsen
2007 Kerteminde	Sif, Skælskør Amatør Sejlklub (DEN); Søren Kæstel; Jens Erik Løppenthin; Karl-Erik Svarre Nielsen	Can-Can, Thisted Sejlklub (DEN); Per Hovmark; Søren Bredal Schultz; Claus Lauritsen	Astrea, Kolding Sejlklub (DEN); Lars Tjørnvig
2008 Glücksburg	Sif, Skælskør Amatør Sejlklub (DEN); Søren Kæstel; Jens Erik Løppenthin; Karl-Erik Svarre Nielsen	Chiquita, Seglervereinigung 1903 Berlin (GER); Cristoph Nielsen; Torben Dehn; Krzysztof Paschke	Ylva, Kieler Yacht-Club (GER); Ulf Kipcke; Dieter Kipcke; Gero Martens
2009 Marstrand	Chiquita, Seglervereinigung 1903 Berlin (GER); Cristoph Nielsen; Torben Dehn; Krzysztof Paschke	Geppelin, Kerteminde Sejlklub (DEN); Per Buch; Hans Schultz; Peter Jørgsholm	Olfert, Kolding Sejlklub (DEN); Heines Nielsen; Helmuth Schwarz; Ole Mathiesen
2010 Skælskør	Chiquita, Seglervereinigung 1903 Berlin (GER); Cristoph Nielsen; Torben Dehn; Finn Felsberg	Jule, Spandauer Yacht-Club (GER); Stefan Schneider; Günter Dörband; Frank Peter Thieme	Joker, Verein Seglerhaus am Wannsee (GER); Udo Pflüger; Lars Jensen; Susanne Pflüger
2011 Travemünde	Jule, Spandauer Yacht-Club (GER); Stefan Schneider; Günter Dörband; Frank Peter Thieme	Chiquita, Seglervereinigung 1903 Berlin (GER); Cristoph Nielsen; Torben Dehn; Finn Felsberg	Paula, Yacht-Club Strande (GER); Walther Furthmann; Hans-Christian Mrowka; Richard Mühe
2012 Sandhamn	Geppelin, Kerteminde Sejlklub (DEN); Per Buch; Per Puck; Hans Schultz	Chiquita, Seglervereinigung 1903 Berlin (GER); Cristoph Nielsen; Gunter May; Klaus Reichenberger	Sif, Skælskør Amatør Sejlklub (DEN); Søren Kæstel; Jens Erik Løppenthin; Karl-Erik Svarre Nielsen
2013 Niendorf an der Ostsee	Cirkeline, Hellerup Sejlklub (DEN); Søren Kæstel; Erik Andersen; Johannes E. Olsen	Paula, Yacht-Club Strande (GER); Walther Furthmann; Gunnar Ceccotti; Anna Pfau	Kong Dus, Kerteminde Sejlklub (DEN); Erik Køster
2014 Kerteminde	Tibbe Tit, Sundby Sejlforening (DEN); Brian Frisendahl; Michael Empacher; Claus Nygaard	ALPI, Kerteminde Sejlklub (DEN); Flemming Palm; Thomas Bastrup; Søren Nissen	hasta la vista, Laboer Regattaverein (GER); Sönke Durst; Karsten Butze Bredt; Marc Rokicki
2015 Warnemünde	Kieler Yacht-Club (GER); Ulf Kipcke; Dieter Kipcke; Peer Jansen	Sundby Sejlforening (DEN); Brian Frisendahl; Michael Empacher; Claus Nygaard	Saaristomeren Purjehdusseura (FIN); Herman Saari; Aleksi Lehtonen; Thomas Hacklin
2016 Helsinki	Kajka, Kolding Sejlklub (DEN); Per Jørgensen	Gisti, Sundby Sejlforening (DEN); Ditte Andreasen	hasta la vista, Laboer Regattaverein (GER); Sönke Durst

== Winning yacht clubs ==
Club	Winners
Kerteminde Sejlklub	17
Kjøbenhavns Amatør-Sejlklub	7
Kieler Yacht-Club	4
Egå Sejlklub	3
Thisted Sejlklub	3
Kolding Sejlklub	2
Skælskør Amatør Sejlklub	2
Seglervereinigung 1903 Berlin	2
Taarbæk Sejlklub	2
Segelclub Eckernförde	1
Flensburger Segel-Club	1
Fredericia Sejlklub	1
Gråsten Sejlklub	1
Haderslev Sejl-Club	1
Hellerup Sejlklub	1
Roskilde Sejlklub	1
Schlei-Segel-Club	1
Skovshoved Sejlklub	1
Spandauer Yacht-Club	1
Sölvesborgs Segelsällskap	1
Sundby Sejlforening	1

== See also ==
- Gold Cup
