= CONCACAF Women's Gold Cup =

CONCACAF Women's Gold Cup may refer to:

- CONCACAF W Championship, known as the CONCACAF Women's Gold Cup from 2000 to 2006, the international women's football tournament beginning in 1991 that decides the champions of CONCACAF and serves as qualifying for the FIFA Women's World Cup
- CONCACAF W Gold Cup, the international women's football tournament that began in 2024

== See also ==
- CONCACAF Gold Cup, the international men's football tournament that decides the champions of CONCACAF
- Gold Cup (disambiguation)
