= Groop =

Groop is a surname. Notable people with the surname include:

- Hans Groop (born 1932), Finnish yacht designer
- Jan Groop (born 1934), Finnish diplomat
- Monica Groop (born 1958), Finnish operatic mezzo-soprano

== See also ==
- Stereolab
