= Dragon Gold Cup =

Annual sailing race

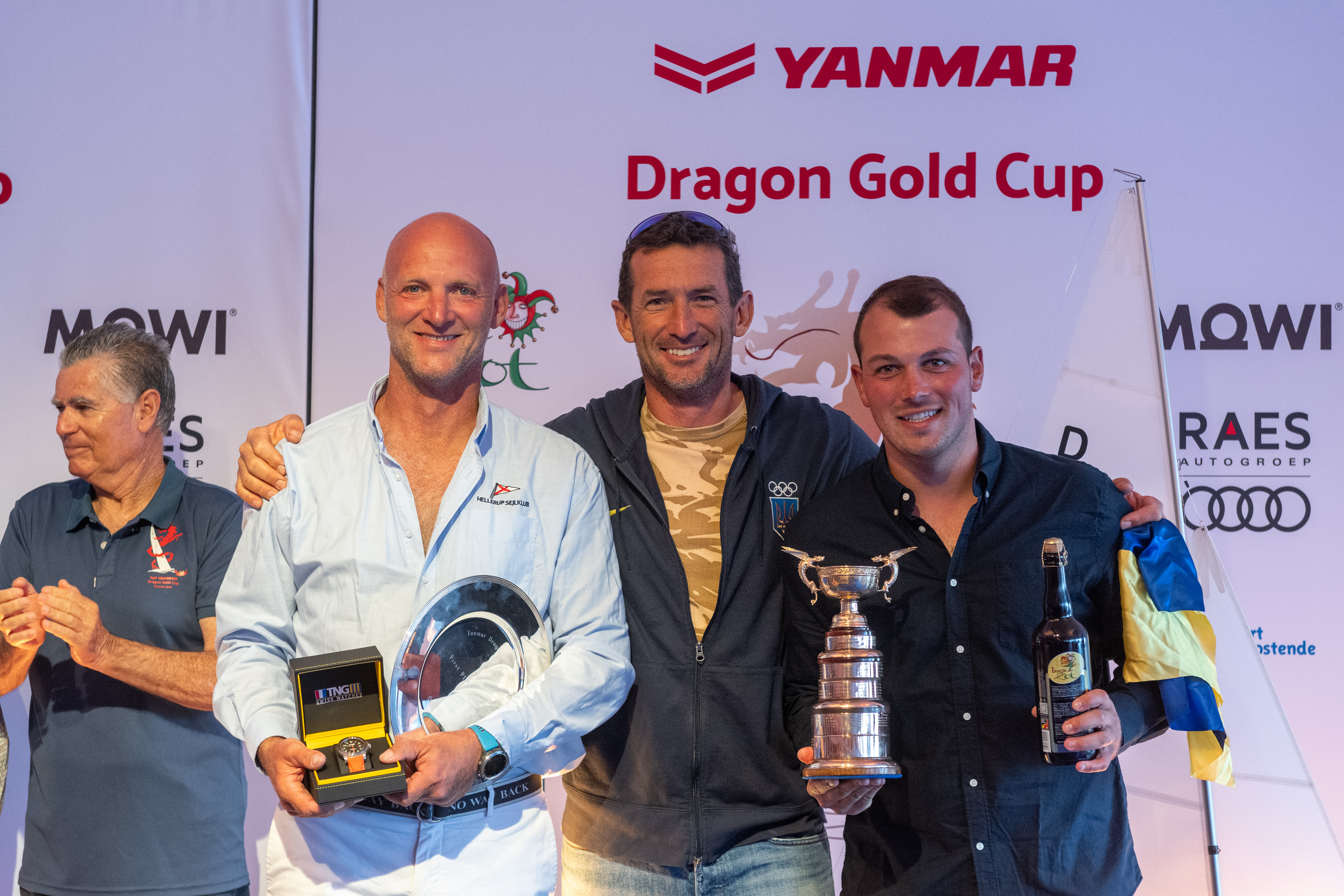
The winners of the 2022 Dragon Gold Cup: Lars Hendriksen (DEN), Kilian Weise (GER) and George Leonchuk (UKR) together with the Gold Cup. Courtesy Ricardo Pinto

The Dragon Gold Cup is an annual sailing race for the Dragon class since 1937, organized by the International Dragon Association and the Clyde Yacht Clubs' Association.

The most successful sailor is Danish Aage Birch, with seven titles, followed by fellow Danish Ole Berntsen, with five titles. In total, Danish crews have won 32 titles.

== History ==
The International Dragon Cup was presented in 1937 by members of the Clyde Yacht's Conference with the intention of bringing together as many competitors of different nationalities as possible for yacht racing in Europe in a friendly spirit, in order to perpetuate the good feeling which existed at the first International Clyde Fortnight. The Clyde Yacht Clubs' Conference has been reconstituted as the Clyde Yacht Clubs' Association and the International Dragon Cup has become known as, and is now renamed, the 'Dragon Gold Cup'.

Members of the Clyde Yacht Clubs' Association created specific rules for this competition and donated a perpetual trophy made of pure gold for an annual international race. From the beginning, the Gold Cup was considered a family event for the Dragon sailors and could be raced by yachts of the International Dragon Class belonging to any country, and for this reason was a very well attended event.

Until 1965, the year of the first Official World Championship, the Gold Cup was considered the unofficial World Cup. The first rules created by the Clyde Yacht Clubs' Association established that the Cup should be sailed annually and that the Cup should be retained by the winner for one year only. It also established that the event should take place in rotation in the following countries: Scotland, France, Sweden, Germany, Holland and Denmark.

With the revision of the rules in 1997, the number of hosting countries was enlarged to eleven: Belgium, Denmark, France, Germany, Ireland, Netherlands, Norway, Portugal, Spain, Sweden and the United Kingdom.

The hosting country and the Organising Authority continue to be selected by the Clyde Yacht Clubs' Association in conjunction with the International Dragon Association and the number of participants was limited to 120.

== Editions ==
Year	Gold	Silver	Bronze
1937 Oslo	Sweden; Rolf Billner		
1938 Travemünde	Germany; Herbert Döhler		
1939 Gothenburg	Sweden; Harald Gedda		
1947 Clyde	Great Britain; W. H. Barnett		
1948 Arendal	Norway; Thor Thorvaldsen		
1949 Marstrand	Denmark; Ole Berntsen		
1950 Vejle	Norway; Thor Thorvaldsen		
1951 Clyde	Denmark; Thorkil Warrer		
1952 Hankø	Norway; Øivind Christensen		
1953 Marstrand	West Germany; Theodor Thomsen		
1954 Skovshoved	Denmark; Ole Berntsen		
1955 Amsterdam	West Germany; Theodor Thomsen		
1956 Clyde	Denmark; Thorkil Warrer		
1957 Hankø	Denmark; Ole Berntsen		
1958 Marstrand	Italy; Sergio Sorrentino		
1959 Skovshoved	Canada; Walter Windeyer		
1960 Amsterdam	Denmark; Ole Berntsen		
1961 Clyde	Great Britain; Sir Gordon Smith		
1962 Hankø	Denmark; Ole Berntsen		
1963 Marstrand	Denmark; Aage Birch		
1964 Travemünde	Denmark; Aage Birch		
1965 IJsselmeer	Denmark; Henning Jensen		
1966 Copenhagen	Denmark; Aage Birch		
1967 Clyde	Denmark; Børge Børresen		
1968 Hankø	Denmark; Aage Birch		
1969 Marstrand	Denmark; Aage Birch		
1970 Travemünde	Denmark; Aage Birch		
1971 Medemblik	United States; A. W. Henry		
1972 Copenhagen	Denmark; Aage Birch		
1973 Clyde	Great Britain; D. Young		
1974 Le Havre	Great Britain; N. Truman		
1975 Marstrand	Denmark; T. Krogh		
1976 Travemünde	West Germany; P. Stulcken		
1977 Kinsale	West Germany; P. Stulcken		
1978 Ebeltoft	Sweden; Bengt Palmquist		
1979 Edinburgh	Sweden; Bengt Palmquist		
1980 Enkhuizen	West Germany; Achim Ulrich		
1981 Douarnenez	West Germany; Alo Schaefer		
1982 Travemünde	West Germany; Dieter Krautgartner		
1983 Marstrand	West Germany; Klaus Oldendorff; Albrecht Spangenberg; Uwe Rathsack;		
1984 Skovshoved	Denmark; Valdemar Bandolowski; Erik Hermann Hansen; Søren Hvalsø		
1985 Clyde	Denmark; Børge Børresen		
1986 Enkhuizen	Denmark; Valdemar Bandolowski; Erik Hermann Hansen; Søren Hvalso		
1987 Clyde	Netherlands; A. F. G. Bakker; Jan Bakker; Steven Vis		
1988 Le Havre	Joker (NED); Fred Imhoff; Hay Winters; Japie Ferwerda		
1989 Travemünde	Joker (NED); Fred Imhoff; Hay Winters; Michiel Pals	Denmark; Lars Jensen; Jan Møller; Claus Møller Christensen	
1990 Dublin	Denmark; Poul Richard Høj Jensen		
1991 Marstrand	Denmark; Lars Jensen; Peter Nielsen; Claus Møller Christensen		
1992 Ostend	Denmark; Poul Richard Høj Jensen		
1993 Medemblik	Joker (NED); Fred Imhoff; Hay Winters; Richard van Rij		
1994 Rungsted	Denmark; Poul Richard Høj Jensen		
1995 Torquay	Germany; Harm Müller-Spreer		
1996 Douarnenez	Germany; Vincent Hösch		
1997 Dublin	Denmark; Poul Richard Høj Jensen		
1998 Cascais	Denmark; Lars Jensen; Finn Leerbeck; Claus Møller Christensen		
1999 Horten	Denmark; Lars Hendriksen		
2000 Warnemünde	Germany; Harm Müller-Spreer; Fendt; Vincent Hoesch	Netherlands; Pieter Heerema; Caspar Harsberg; Dolf Peet	Finland; Henrik Dahlman; Theis Palm; Magnus Borg
2001 Ostende	Germany; Harm Müller-Spreer		
2002 Mariehamn	Sinwave (GER); Thomas Muller; Mario Wagner; Björn Österreich	Danish Joker (NED); Fred Imhoff; Richard van Rij; Rudy den Outer	Finland; Fredrik Markelin; Jari Bremer; Patrick Lindeman
2003 Medemblik	Denmark; Jørgen Schönherr; Axel Waltersdorph; Anders Kaempe	Denmark; Frank Berg; Søren Kæstel; Maria Holm	Netherlands; Pieter van Reeuwijk; Eric Bakker; Thierry van Vierssen
2004 Falmouth	Denmark; Jørgen Schönherr; Axel Waltersdorph; Anders Kaempe		
2005 Sandhamn	African Queen (DEN); Jørgen Schönherr; Axel Waltersdorph; Anders Kaempe	Nanoq (DEN); Frederik, Crown Prince of Denmark; Theis Palm; Kasper Harsberg	Roberto (GER); Phillip Ocker; Florian Grosser; Oliver Davis
2006 Douarnenez	Germany; Werner Fritz		Denmark; Jørgen Schönherr; Axel Waltersdorph; Anders Kaempe
2007 Palma de Mallorca	Denmark; Lars Hendriksen; Philipp Skafte-Holm; Lars Stenfeldt		
2008 Cascais	Danish Blue (DEN); Poul Richard Høj Jensen; Theis Palm; Andrew Norden	Jerboa (GBR); Gavia Wilkinson-Cox; Jon Mortimer; Ron Rosenberg	Quicksilver III (GBR); Robert Campbell; Matt Walker; Jonathan Hill
2009 Skagen	CCCP (UKR); Ruslana Taran; Roman Sadchikov; Vadim Statsenko	Bunker Queen (UKR); Lars Hendriksen; Sergei Pugatcher; George Leontschuk	Annapurna (RUS); Anatoly Loginov; Andrey Kirilyuk; Alexander Shalagin
2010 Marstrand	Annapurna (RUS); Anatoly Loginov; Andrey Kirilyuk; Alexander Shalagin	Bunker Queen (UKR); Lars Hendriksen; Igor Sidorov; Georgiy Leonchuk	Xalet (POR); Filipe Silva; Henrique Costa E. Silva; Miguel Pinto
2011 Ostende	Bunker Queen (UKR); Markus Wieser; Sergey Pughchev; Matti Paschen	African Queen (DEN); Jørgen Schönherr; Jan Eli Gravad; Lars Wegner	Annapurna (RUS); Anatoly Loginov; Andrey Kirilyuk; Alexander Shalagin
2012 Kinsale	Sinewave (GER); Tommy Müller; Vincent Hoesch; Michael Lipp	Alfie (GBR); Lawrie Smith; Tim Tavinor; Joost Houweling	Strange Little Girl (RUS); Dmitry Samokhin; Andrey Kirilyuk; Aleksey Bushuev
2013 Douarnenez	Bunker Queen (UKR); Markus Wieser; Sergey Pughchev; Georgiy Leonchuk	Bunker Prince (UKR); Evgeny Braslavetz; Igor Sidirov; Sergiy Timokhov	Troïka (NED); Pieter Heerema; Theis Palm; Hervé Connigham
2014 Medemblik	Bunker Queen (UAE); Markus Wieser; Sergey Pughchev; Georgiy Leonchuk	Troïka (NED); Pieter Heerema; Theis Palm; Claus Olesen	Bunker Prince (UAE); Yevgen Braslavets; Igor Sidorov; Sergiy Timokhov
2015 Kühlungsborn	Lawrie Smith (GBR); Lawrie Smith; Tim Tavinor; Joost Houweling	Strange Little Girl (RUS); Dmitry Samokhin; Andrey Kirilyuk; Aleksey Bushuev	Sinewave (GER); Tommy Müller; Vincent Hoesch; Marc Pickel
2016 Hornbæk	Sophie Racing (SUI); Hugo Stenbeck; Martin Westerdahl; Bernardo Freitas	Bunker Prince (UAE); Yevgen Braslavets; Sergiy Timokhov; Aleksander Mirchuk	Nina (DEN); Nicklas Holm; Mathias Thomsen; Jonas Høgh
2017 St. Tropez	Desert Holly (GER); Stephan Link; Frank Butzmann; Michael Lipp -	Pow Wow (GER); Pedro Rebelo de Andrade; Charles Nankin; Lauren Fry; Carolin Laetzsch	Desert Eagle (UAE); Hendrik Wikmann; Markus Koy; Robert Stanjek
2018 Helsinki	African Queen XI (DEN); Jørgen Schönherr; Christian Videbaek; Theis Palm	Troika (NED); Pieter Heerema; Lars Hendriksen; George Leonchuk	Provezza Dragon (TUR); Andy Beadsworth; Ali Tezdiker; Simon Fry
2019 Medemblik	Neptune (POR-84) (POR); Pedro Andrade; Christian Giannini; Joao Vidinha	Troika (NED-412) (NED); Pieter Heerema; Lars Hendriksen; George Leonchuk	Yred (JPN-56) (JPN); Peter Gilmour; Sam Gilmour; Yasuhiro Yaji
2021 Marstrand	Troika (NED-412) (NED); Pieter Heerema; Lars Hendriksen; George Leonchuk	Petti Portugal (POR-89) (POR); Pedro Andrade; João Vidinha; Luis Queiroz	Yred (JPN-56) (JPN); David Gilmour; Sam Gilmour; Yasuhiro Yaji
2022 Ostend	EVA on FIRE (DEN-138) (DEN); Lars Hendriksen; Kilian Wiese; George Leonchuk	Provezza Dragon (TUR-1212) (TUR); Andy Beadsworth; Arda Baykal; Simon Fry	Bande A Part (FRA-428) (FRA); Gery Trentesaux; Christian Ponthieu; Jean Queveau; Morgan Riou

== See also ==
- Gold Cup (disambiguation)
- Dragon World Championships
