= Claus Høj Jensen =

Danish sailor and sail maker (born 1970)

Personal information
- Nationality: Danish

Sailing career
- Sport: Sailing
- Club: Herslev Strand Sejlklub
- Classes: H-boat, Dragon, Yngling
Medal record
Representing Denmark
World championships
Gold medal – first place	1999 Martenique	Dragon
Gold medal – first place	2008 Hanko	H-boat
Gold medal – first place	2011 Neustadt	H-boat
Gold medal – first place	2013 Thisted	H-boat
Gold medal – first place	2014 Varberg	H-boat
Gold medal – first place	2015 Lake Garda	H-boatø
Gold medal – first place	2017 Brunnen	H-boat
Gold medal – first place	2018 Sandefjord	H-boat
Gold medal – first place	2019 Medemblik	H-boat
Gold medal – first place	2021 Struer	H-boat
Gold medal – first place	2022 Warnemünde	H-boat
Bronze medal – third place	2016 Helsinki	H-boat

Claus Høj Jensen is a Danish sailor and sail maker. He is competing in the Dragon, H-boat, Yngling and OK classes. He is the son of Poul Richard Høj Jensen. Høj Jensen represents Herslev Strand Sejlklub. He runs the sail making loft Høj Jensen Sails.

Claus Høj Jensen has won the H-boat Danish Championship 9 times.

In 2018, he took his ninth H-boat World Championship title during competitions in Struer.
