= Harald Gedda =

Swedish Dragon class sailor

Johan Harald Gedda (1869-1948) was a Swedish Dragon class sailor. He won the 1939 Dragon Gold Cup. He was the father of Swedish sailor Per Gedda.
