= Heinrich Dahlinger =

German handball player (1922-2008)

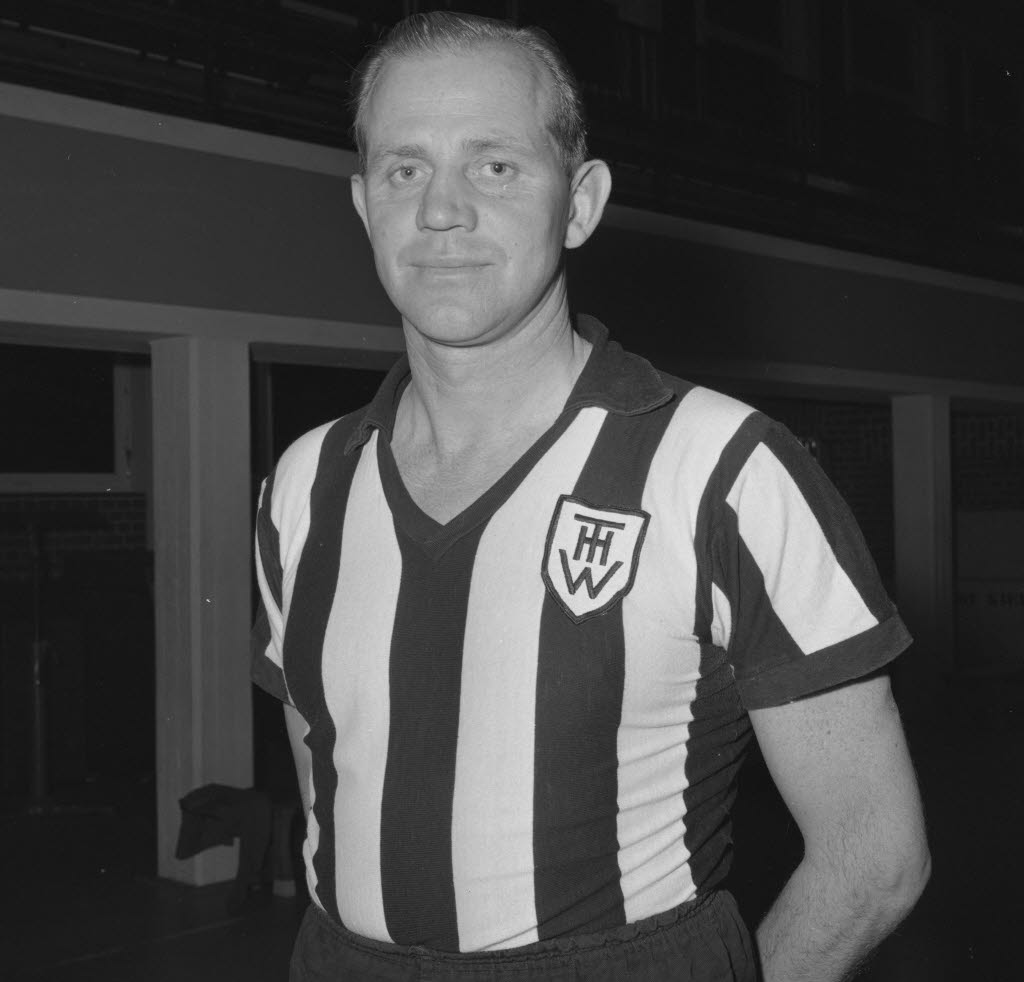
Dahlinger with THW Kiel in 1964

Heinrich "Hein Daddel" Dahlinger (30 October 1922 – 2 February 2008) was a German world-class field handball and team handball player and entrepreneur of a wood sale company. With his winning of the Nordic Folkboat Gold Cup on his boat the Daddel in 1963 he was the unofficial champion of Nordic Folkboat.

Dahlinger was the first THW Kiel player to score more than 100 goals on the German national team. He played 38 national team matches in total and scored more than 110 goals. With the German team he was world champion in field handball in 1952 and 1955.

Dahlinger was born in Kiel. He died of kidney failure in Rendsburg.
