= Jan Gustafson =

Swedish sailor

Jan Gustafson is a Swedish sailor in the H-boat class. He became World Champion in 1997 and 2001.
