= Gold Cup =

Gold Cup may refer to:

In art and archaeology:

- Royal Gold Cup, 14th century French cup in the British Museum
- Rillaton Gold Cup, late Neolithic, from Rillaton Barrow in England
- Ringlemere Cup, Bronze Age from England

In horse racing:

- Ascot Gold Cup, horse race run at Ascot Racecourse, UK, during June
- Awapuni Gold Cup, major horse race run under weight-for-age conditions held in Awapuni, Palmerston North, New Zealand
- Ayr Gold Cup, flat horse race run at Ayr Racecourse
- Cheltenham Gold Cup, steeplechase run at Cheltenham Racecourse
- Geraldton Gold Cup, one of Western Australia's most popular races
- Gold Cup at Greyville, Grade III stakes race over 3200m held at Greyville in Durban, South Africa
- Gold Cup at Santa Anita Stakes, Grade I stakes race currently held at Santa Anita Park
- Gold Cup Steeplechase American race
- Hawthorne Gold Cup Handicap, Grade II race for thoroughbred horses run at Hawthorne Race Course each year
- Jockey Club Gold Cup, horse race, Elmont, New York
- BetVictor Gold Cup, steeplechase run at Cheltenham Racecourse
- December Gold Cup, steeplechase run at Cheltenham Racecourse
- Tattersalls Gold Cup, horse race run at The Curragh, Ireland in May
- Virginia Gold Cup, steeplechase run on the first Saturday in May, American

In association football:

- Copa de Oro (Spanish: Gold Cup), South American association football competition between the club winners of the Copa Libertadores de América, the Supercopa Sudamericana, the Copa CONMEBOL, and the Supercopa Masters
- CONCACAF Gold Cup, association football competition between nations from North and Central America and from the Caribbean
- CONCACAF W Championship, known as the CONCACAF Women's Gold Cup from 2000 to 2006, women's association football competition
- CONCACAF W Gold Cup, women's association football competition
- Gold Cup (India), the 4-team women's association football tournament organised by the All India Football Federation (AIFF)
- Gold Cup (Northern Ireland), defunct association football competition
- Aga Khan Gold Cup, defunct association football competition

In rugby union:

- Gold Cup (rugby union), a South African rugby union competition between the winners of the club championships of provincial unions

In motorsport:

- Oulton Park International Gold Cup, an annual non-Championship Formula One race of the 1950s and '60s, recently reinstated for historic F1 cars
- APBA Gold Cup, an annual hydroplane racing cup
- UAW-GM Spirit of Detroit Hydrofest, an annual hydroplane racing cup on the Detroit River, formerly known as the Gold Cup
- HAPO Gold Cup, an H1 Unlimited hydroplane boat race held each July on the Columbia River in Columbia Park, Tri-Cities, Washington
- Steve Henshaw Gold Cup, an annual motorcycle circuit race, held at Oliver's Mount, in Scarborough, England

In sailing:

- Scandinavian Gold Cup, annual nation race of 5.5 metre class yachts.
- Dragon Gold Cup, established in 1937 for Dragon Class one-design yachts.
- Finn Gold Cup, annual World Championship event for Finn dinghies.
- King Edward VII Gold Cup, raced in Bermuda with International One Design class yachts.
- Nordic Folkboat Gold Cup, established in 1963 for Nordic Folkboat class one-design yachts.

In contract bridge:

- Gold Cup (bridge), the premier open competition in the United Kingdom

In Television:

- "The Gold Cup", an episode of Raffles

== See also ==
- Cup of Gold (novel), 1929 novel by John Steinbeck
- Cup of Gold, Solandra maxima, tropical tree-climbing plant
