= Pieter Heerema =

French skipper and navigator

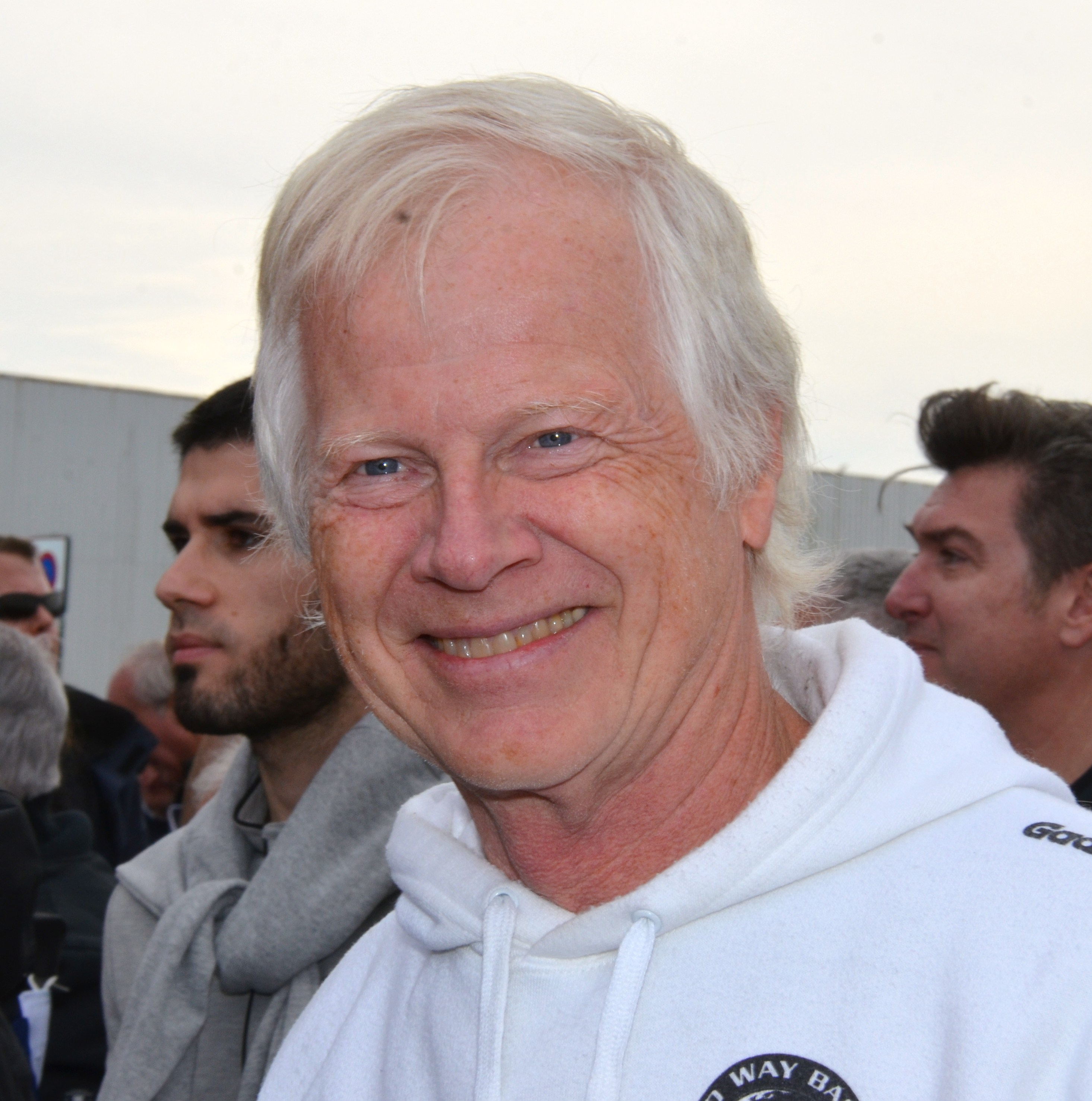

Personal information
- Nationality: Dutch
- Born: 6 June 1951 (age 74); Maracaibo, Venezuela

Sailing career
- Class(es): IMOCA 60, Dragon (keelboat)

Pieter Heerema (born 6 June 1951) is a Venezuelan-Dutch industrialist and amateur sailor who participated in the 2016–2017 Vendée Globe. Since 1989, he has been president of the Family Group Heerema which manufactures, among other things, drilling rigs.

== Sailing career ==
He started his life in Venezuela but at the age of eleven, he came to live in the Netherlands and begins to sail on a Flits a small Dutch double dinghy popular with the youth then moving onto the 470 and keelboats Yngling, J/22 and J/24.

He started sailing larger boats campaigning at a higher International level in both the Dragon and his RC44 on the boat named "No Way Back".

He participated in the 2016–2017 Vendée Globe with limited offshore racing and solo experience he was very much coming from the adventurer side. He said he wanted to completing the round-the-world trip in "an acceptable race time" in a racing situation. He initially was looked at chartering or used boats in good condition. But he end up buying his boat "No Way Back" that was being commissioned under the name "Vento di Sardegna" for Andrea Mura whose main sponsor was the region of Sardinia who no longer could support the project due to the economic crisis. So in September 2015 he got the brand new foiling generation IMOCA 60 designed by Verdier / VPLP design built in Bergamo Italy at the Persico Marine was launched in Lorient on 17 August 2015. He took on lots of advice from consultant including Michel Desjoyeaux and built up his experience qualified for the Vendée Globe by participating in April 2016 at the Calero Solo Transat between Lanzarote and Newport. He went on to be one of the oldest competitors to complete the race finishing 17th.

In 2019 he finished 2nd in Dragon Gold Cup on his boat called Troika. And in 2021 he finished 1st in Dragon Gold Cup in Marstrand on his boat NED-412 Troika.

== Tax evasion ==
In 2023 one of his companies "Heavy Transport Holding Denmark ApS" was convicted in Denmark for tax evasion. The company was ordered to pay 449 million Danish kroner (approx. 60 million Euros) to the Danish tax authorities. Three days after this conviction Pieter Heerema decided to default the company in order to evade the repayment of his open-standing taxes.

== Gallery ==
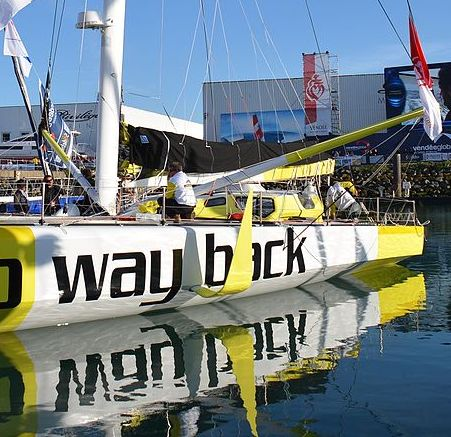

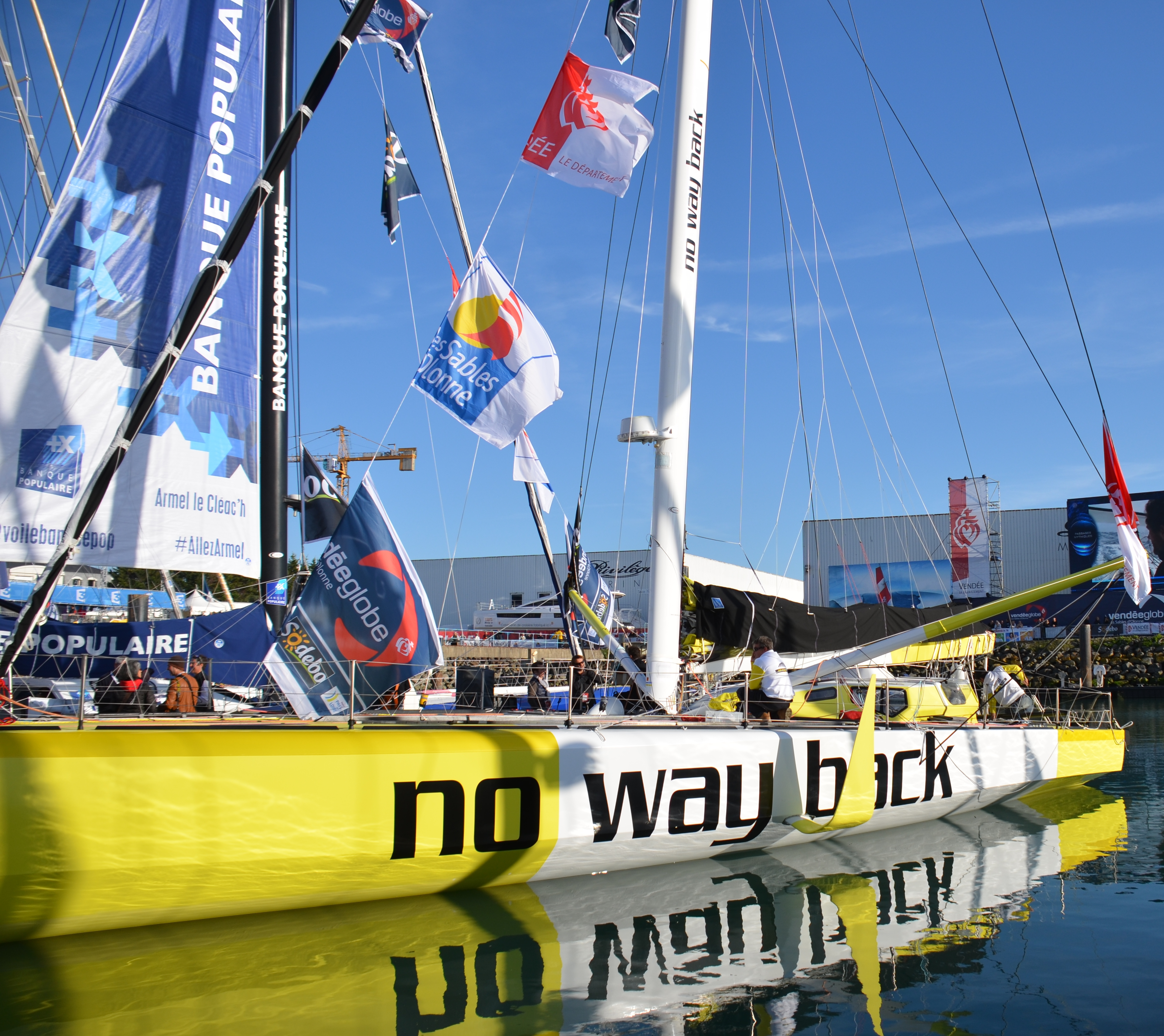

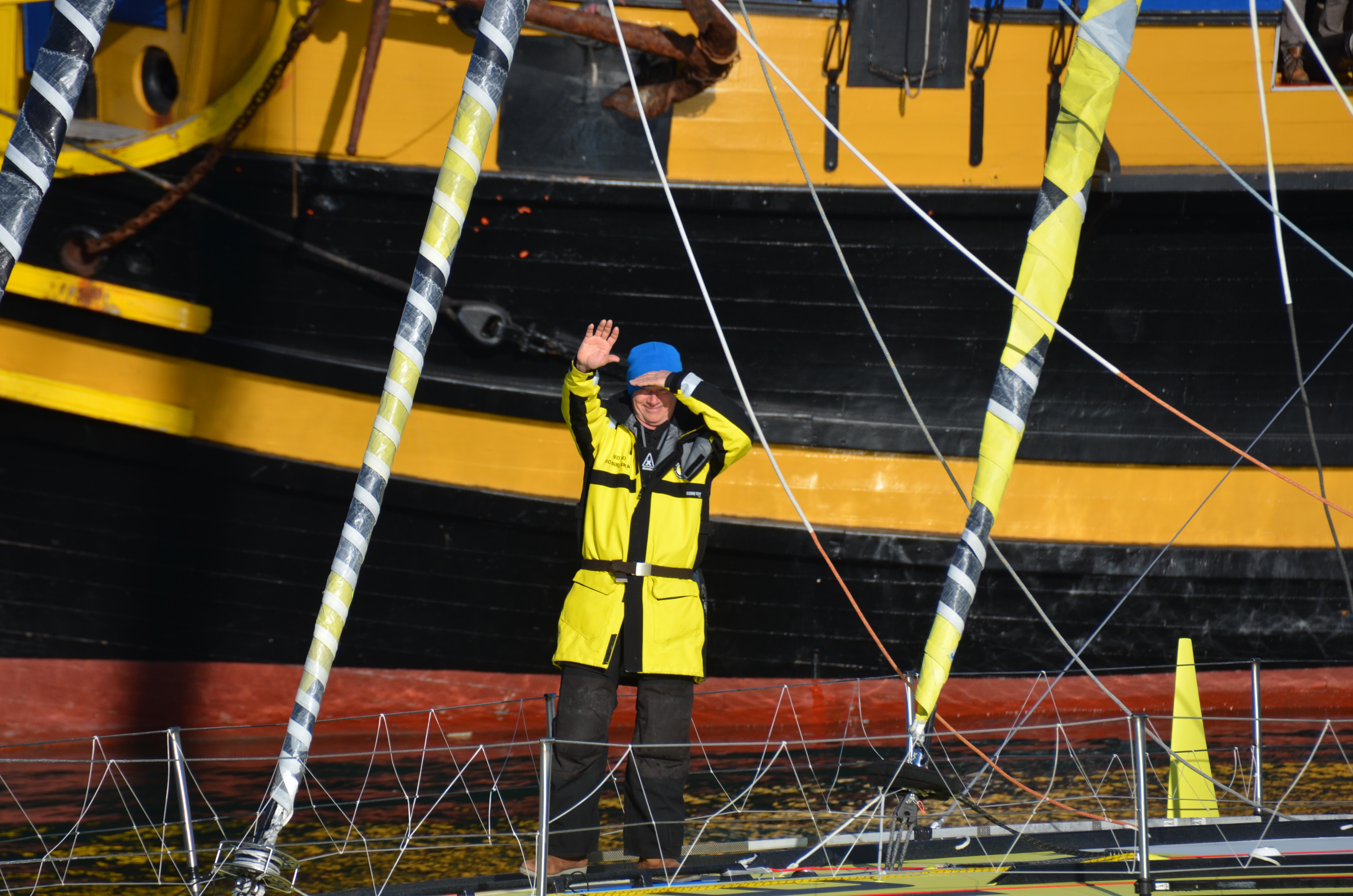

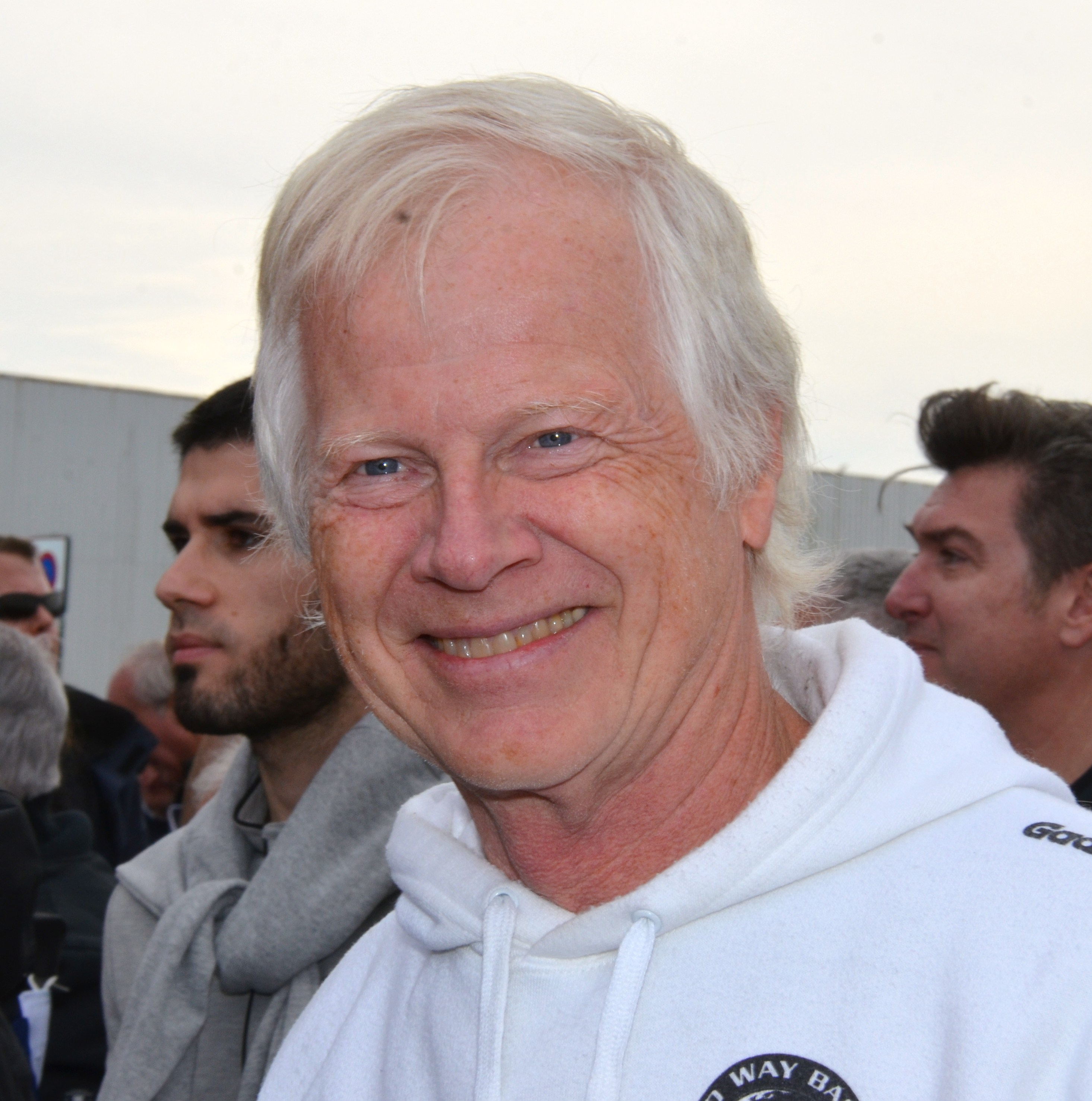

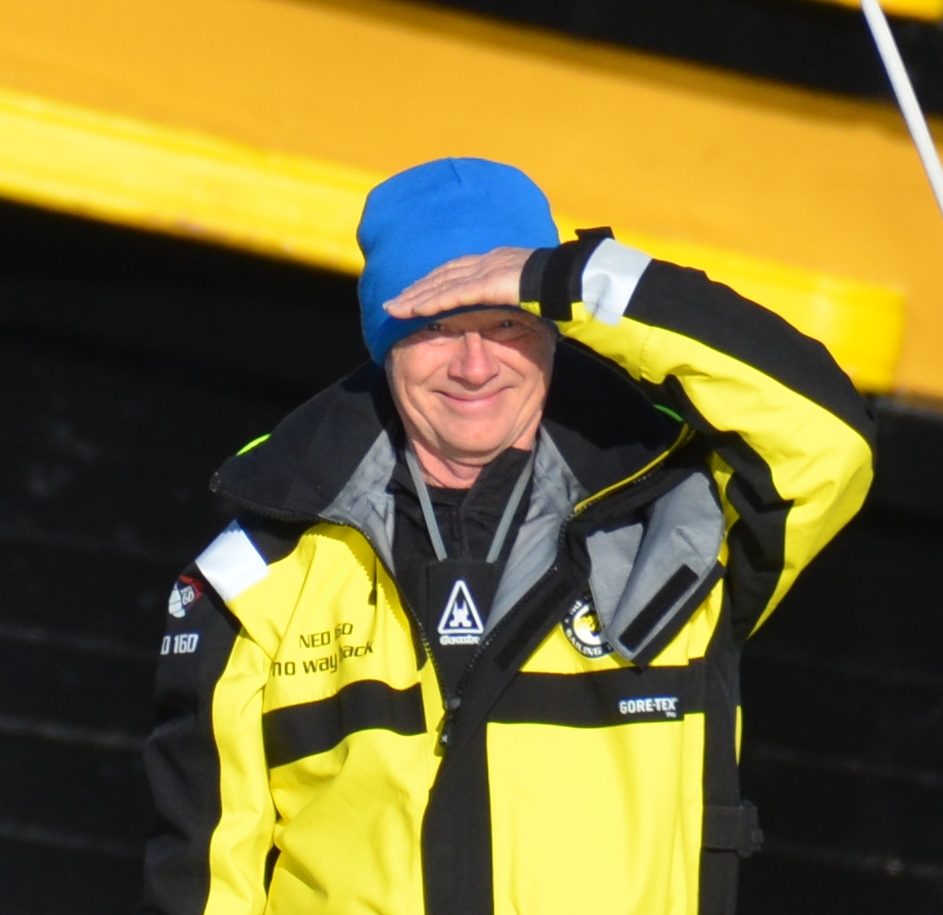

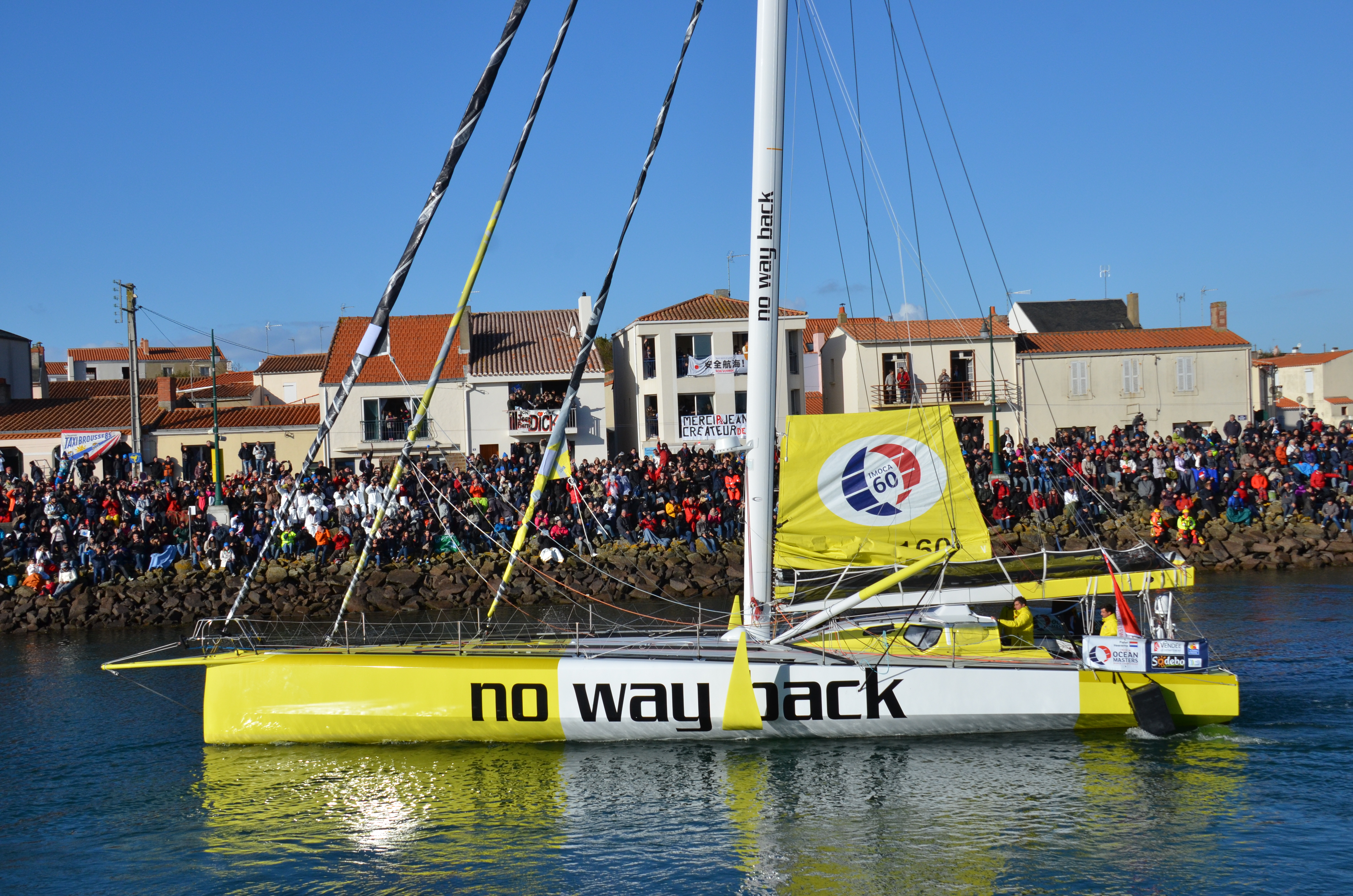

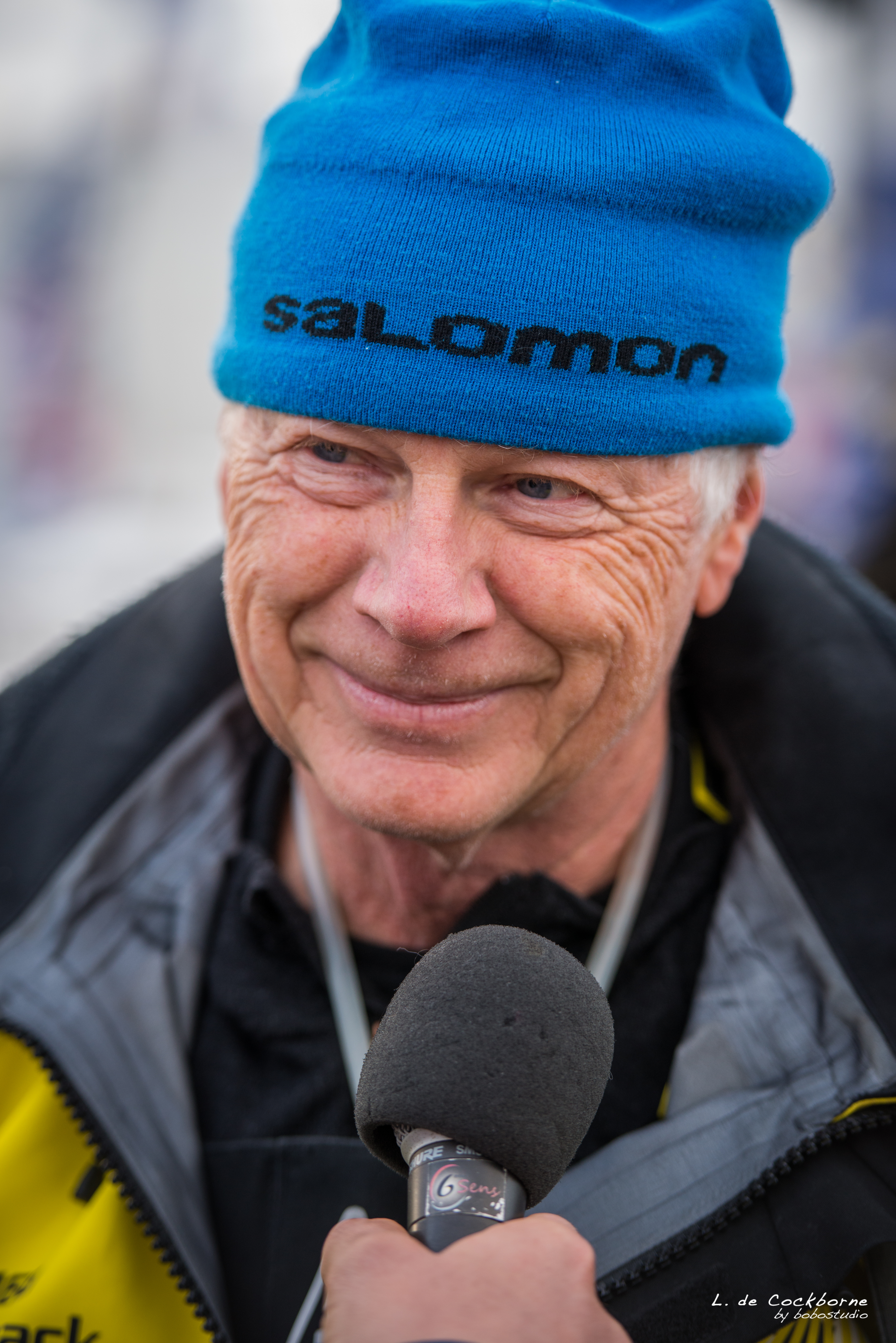

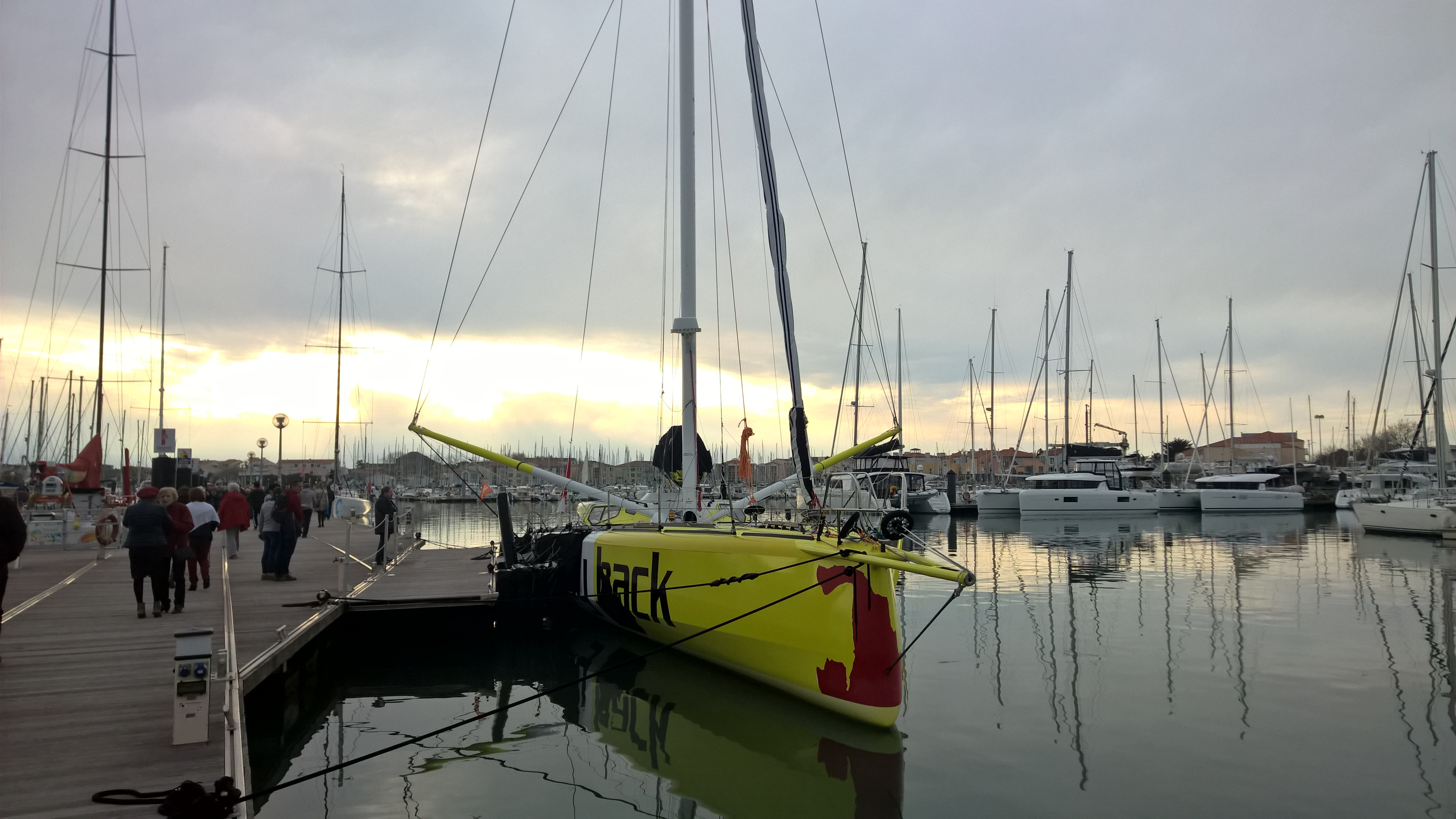

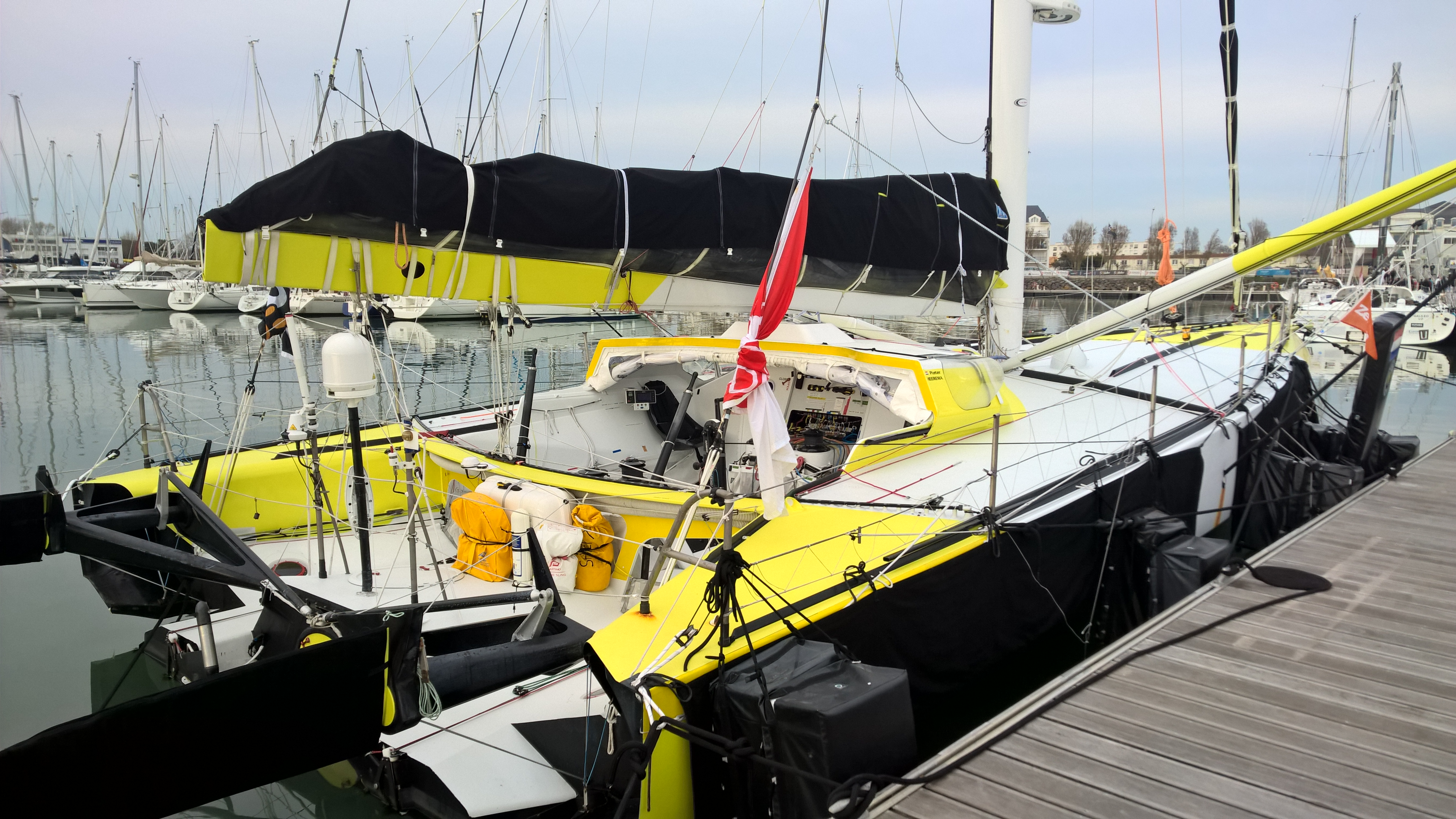

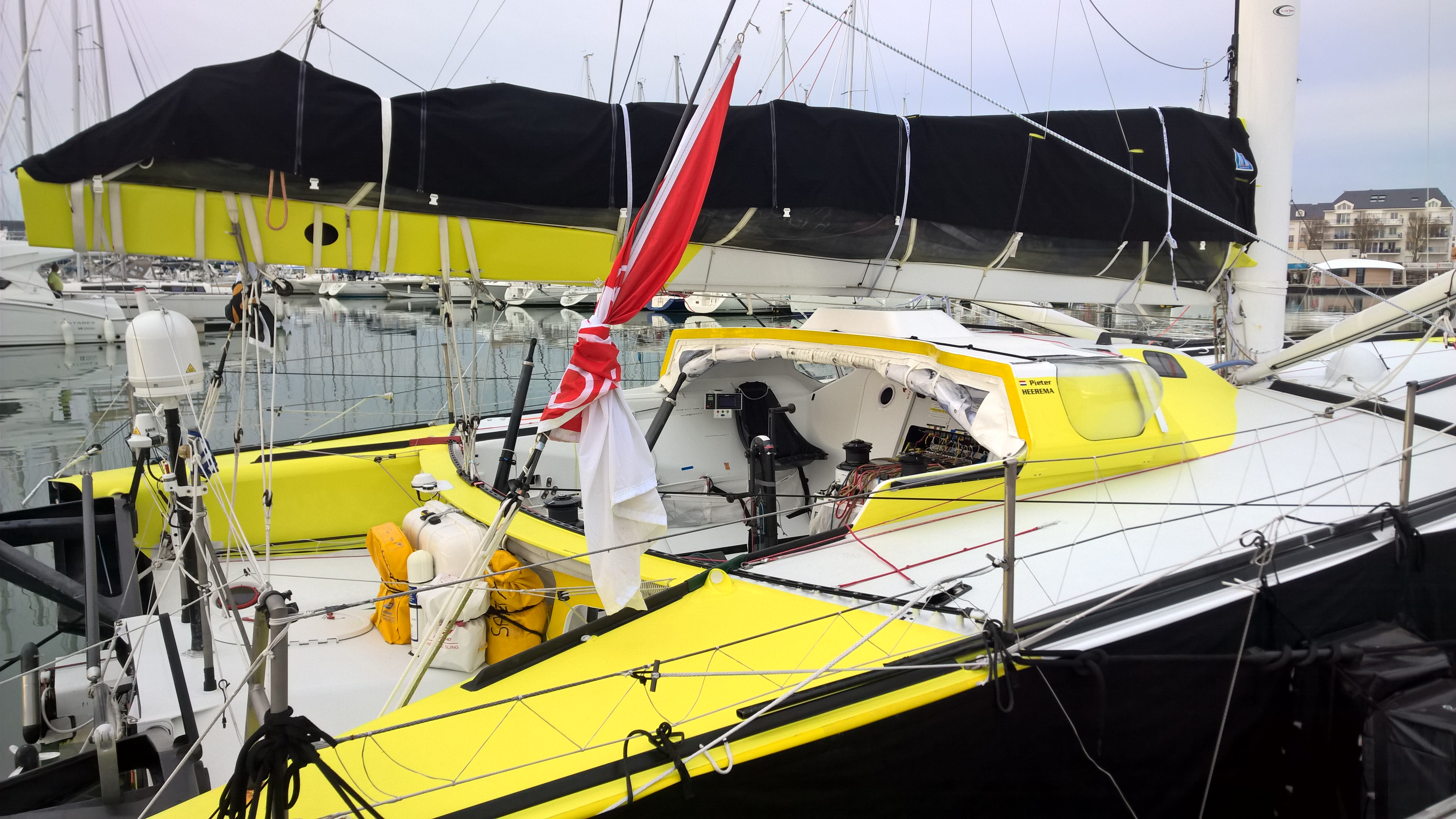
