= Hans Groop =

Finnish yacht designer

Hans Groop (born 1932) is a Finnish yacht designer based in Helsinki.

Groop was born in Vaasa. He has designed more than a hundred yachts and motorboats, the most famous being the H-boat, one of the most popular yacht classes in the world. Groop has been a lifelong member of the Helsingfors Segelsällskap, a leading yacht club for smaller keelboats in the Nordics. The club initiated the H-boat in 1967 to replace the popular but by then outmoded Hai.

Some of his other designs are the H-35, H-40, H-star, H-323, Targa 42, Targa 96, Finnsailor 34 and 29, Degerö 33, Joe 17, Joe 34, Netta, IS 400, Artina 29 and Artina 33 as well as a lot of one-off boats. Groop has also designed boats of the 5.5 Metre class.
