= Steve Mitchell (sailor) =

British sailor

Medal record

Representing Great Britain

Men's sailing

World Championships
Gold medal – first place	1997 Hong Kong	Etchell class
Gold medal – first place	2002 Los Angeles	Star class
Bronze medal – third place	2001 Lymington	Etchell class
Bronze medal – third place	2003 Cádiz	Star class
Bronze medal – third place	2004 Gaeta	Star class
Bronze medal – third place	2005 Buenos Aires	Star class

European Championships
Gold medal – first place	1997 Lake Garda	Etchell class
Gold medal – first place	1998 Douarnenez	Etchell class
Gold medal – first place	2005 Varberg	Star class

Steven Mitchell (born 10 February 1970 in Dorking, Surrey) is a British sailor. He competed at the 2004 Summer Olympics in Athens and finished 6th in the double-handed Star class with Iain Percy.

The same team won the 2002 Star World Championship in Los Angeles, and medalled in the next three world championships and won the gold medal at the 2005 European Championship. They were also number one in the ISAF sailing world rankings in 2003.
