= Hamish McKay =

New Zealand television presenter

Hamish McKay is a New Zealand television presenter. He was the lead sportscaster, rugby editor, and sports journalist for 3 News, presenting the sports news on the weekday 6pm bulletins. He is a sports presenter and commentator for sports coverage on TV3. He was the lead commentator at the 2007 and 2011 Rugby World Cup for the TV3 network.

McKay is an active contributor of commentary across radio stations, including hosting ground breaking Farming show REX Rural Exchange. He claims to be qualified having shorn in the New Zealand Junior Shearing Championship final at Te Kuiti in 1987.

He was also the unwitting star of the segment "McKay-ver" on TV3's sports comedy television show Pulp Sport. This skit, a spoof of the television show MacGyver, involves Pulp Sport's hosts Bill and Ben, playing pranks on McKay. The pranks often revolve around the victim's car, such as covering the car with 'Post-It' notes or decorating it in a manner similar to that of the General Lee, and / or around the victim's office area, such as wrapping the victim's office equipment with fishing line.

His early TV shows included Ansett NZ Time of Your Life, with Marc Ellis and Matthew Ridge. McKay co-hosted 65 episodes over two seasons in the mid-nineties.

McKay is an old boy of Palmerston North Boys' High School. He played prop in the schools 1st XV in 1982 and 1983.

== See also ==
- List of New Zealand television personalities
