= Frank Høj Jensen =

Danish sailor

Personal information
- Nationality: Danish
- Born: 12 September 1945 (age 79); Copenhagen, Denmark

Sport
- Sport: Sailing

Frank Høj Jensen (born 12 September 1945) is a Danish sailor. He competed in the Dragon event at the 1972 Summer Olympics.
