= Fabrice Amedeo =

French sailor and journalist (born 1978)

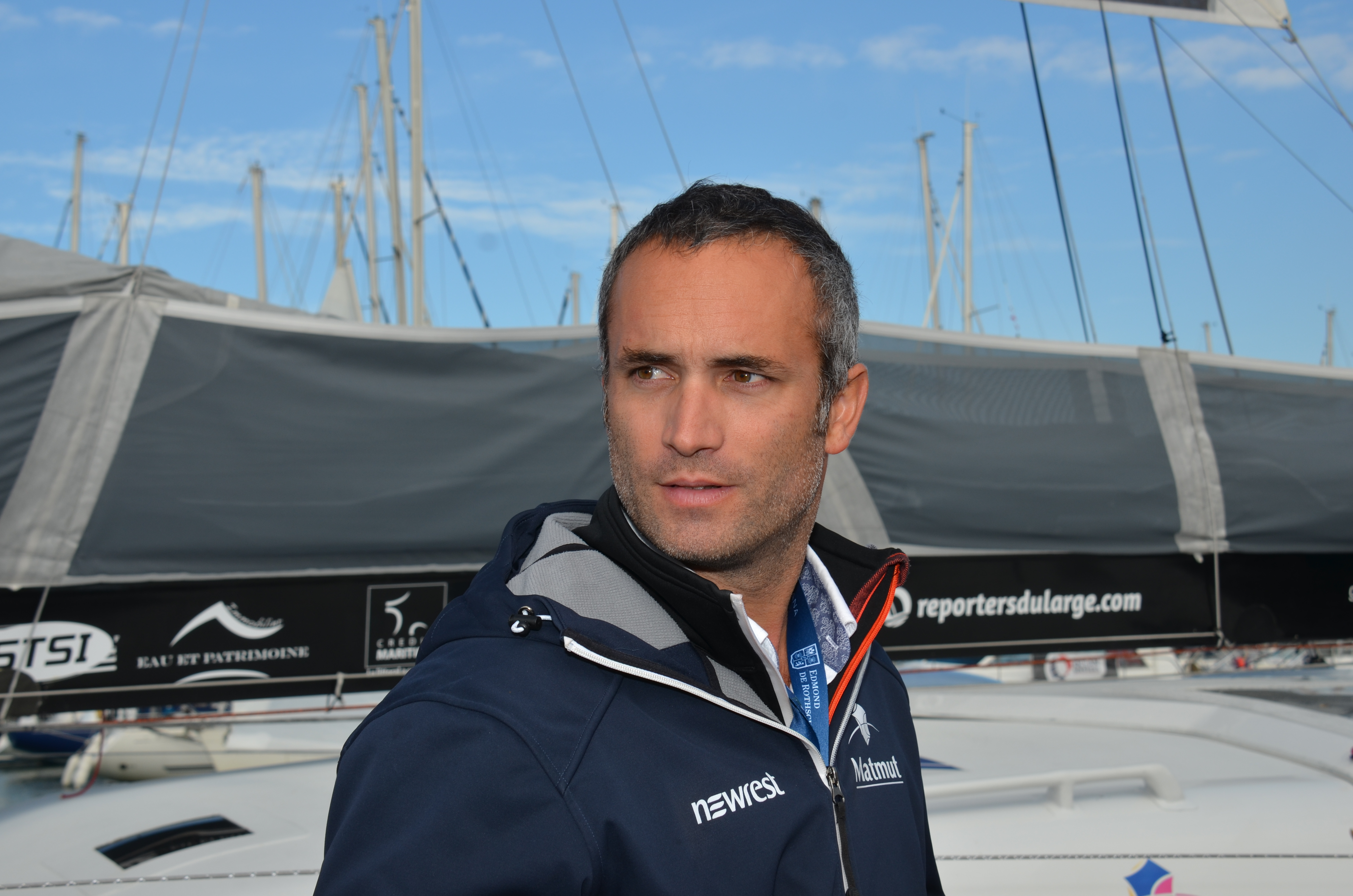

Personal information
- Nationality: French
- Born: 24 February 1978 (age 48) Château-Gontier

Sailing career
- Sport: Sailing

Fabrice Amedeo is a French sailor born on 24 February 1978 in Château-Gontier in the Mayenne region. He is an offshore professional sailor having competed in the Vendée Globe, finishing 11th in 2016. He also competed in the 2020 edition when he had to retire due to various technical problems with his onboard electronics. Amedeo is also a well-known political journalist for Le Figaro.

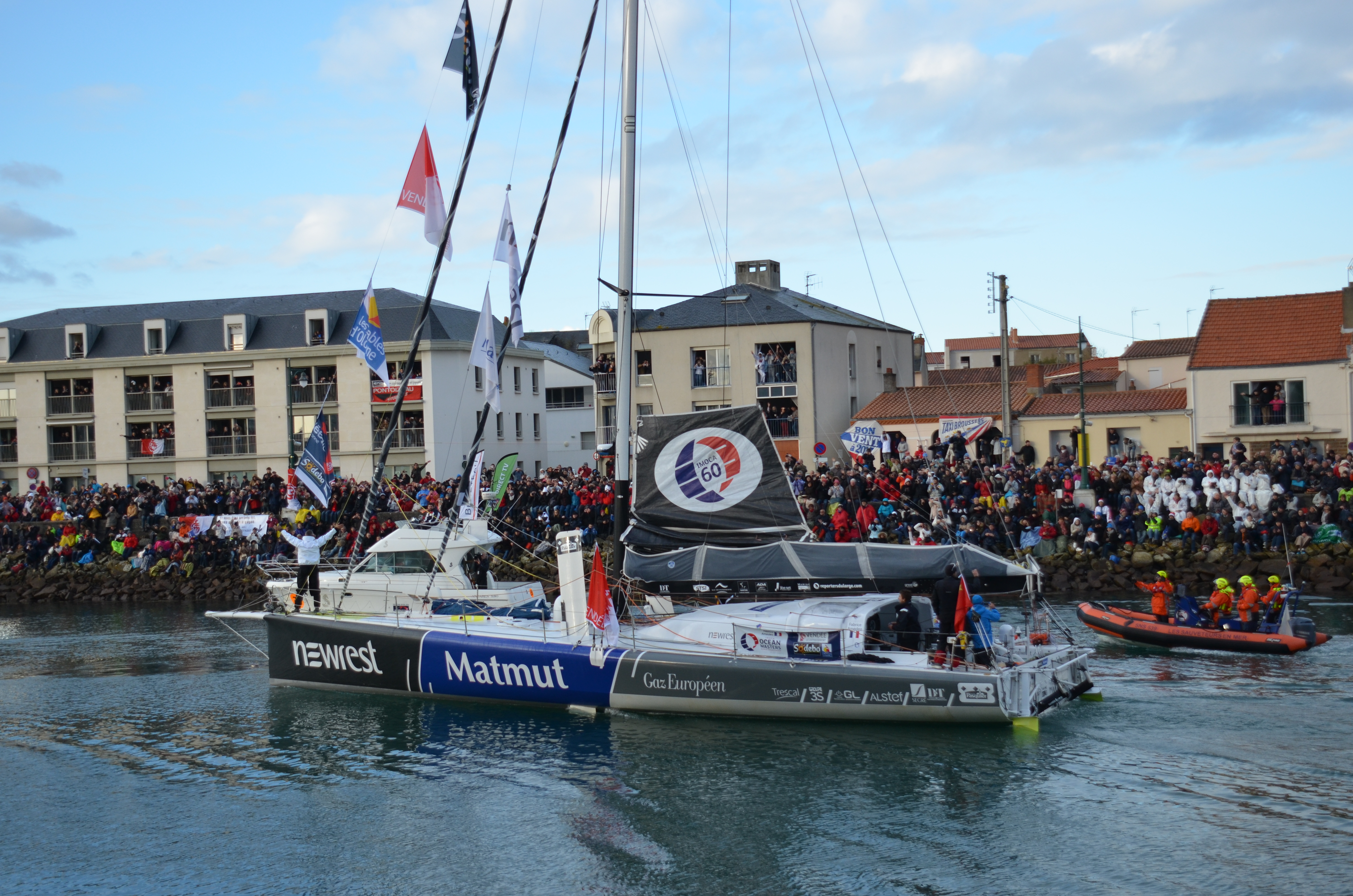

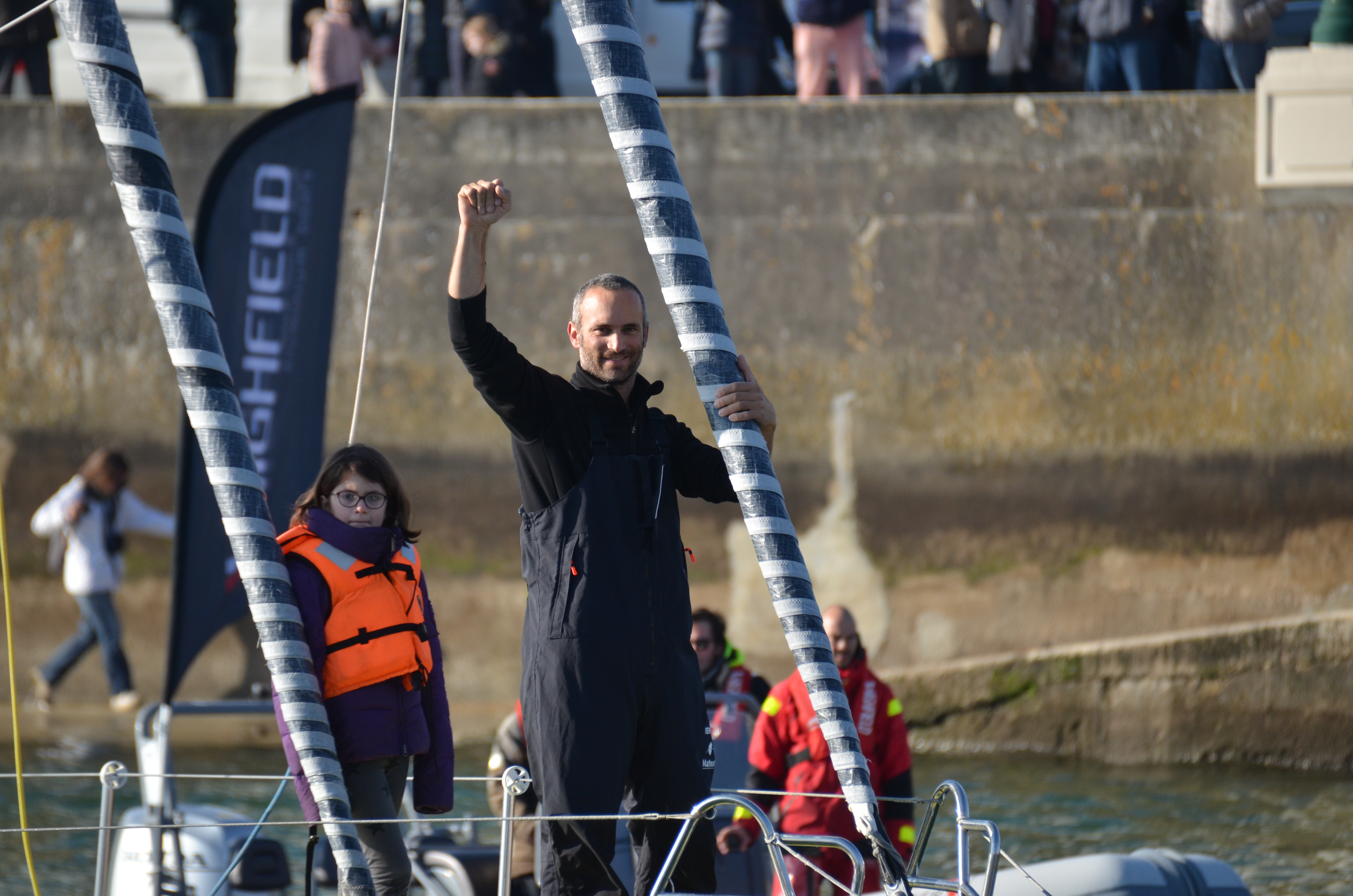

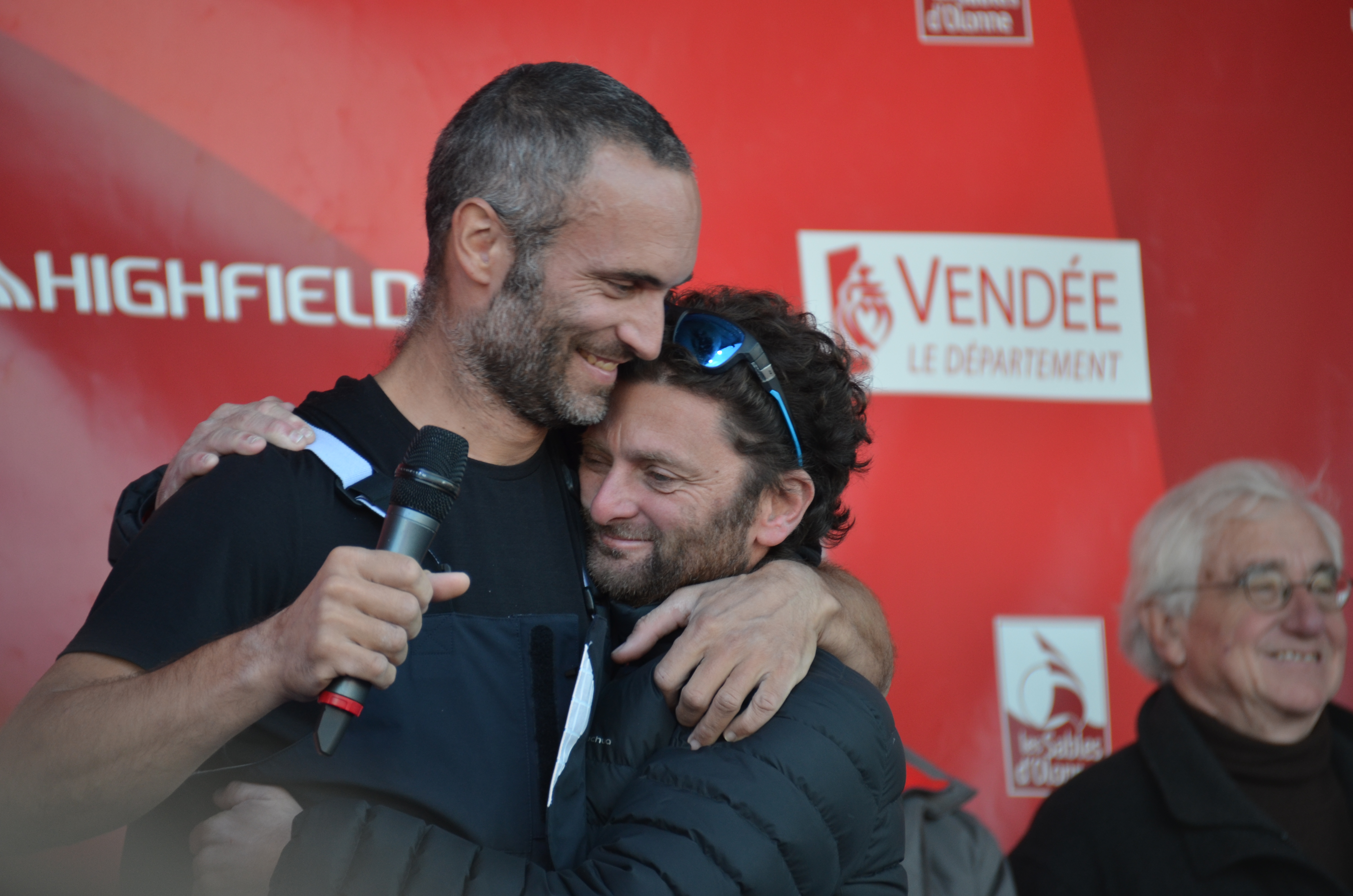
