= Morten Nielsen (sailor) =

Danish sailor

Personal information
- Nationality: Danish
- Born: 14 March 1960 (age 66) Copenhagen, Denmark

Sport
- Sport: Sailing

Morten Nielsen (born 14 March 1960) is a Danish sailor. He competed in the Star event at the 1980 Summer Olympics.
