= Theis Palm =

Danish sailor

Theis Palm is a Danish sailor in the Soling, Dragon, H-boat and Folkboat classes. He won the 2009 Dragon World Championship together with Poul Richard Høj Jensen and Lars Jensen.
