= H-boat =

Sailboat class

- Class symbol

Development
- Designer: Hans Groop
- Year: 1967

Boat
- Crew: 3–4
- Draft: 1.3 m (4 ft 3 in)

Hull
- Hull weight: 1,450 kg (3,200 lb)
- LOA: 8.28 m (27.2 ft)
- LWL: 6.30 m (20.7 ft)
- Beam: 2.18 m (7 ft 2 in)

Sails
- Mainsail area: 14.8 m^{2} (159 sq ft)
- Jib/genoa area: 10.2 m^{2} (110 sq ft)
- Spinnaker area: 36.0 m^{2} (388 sq ft)

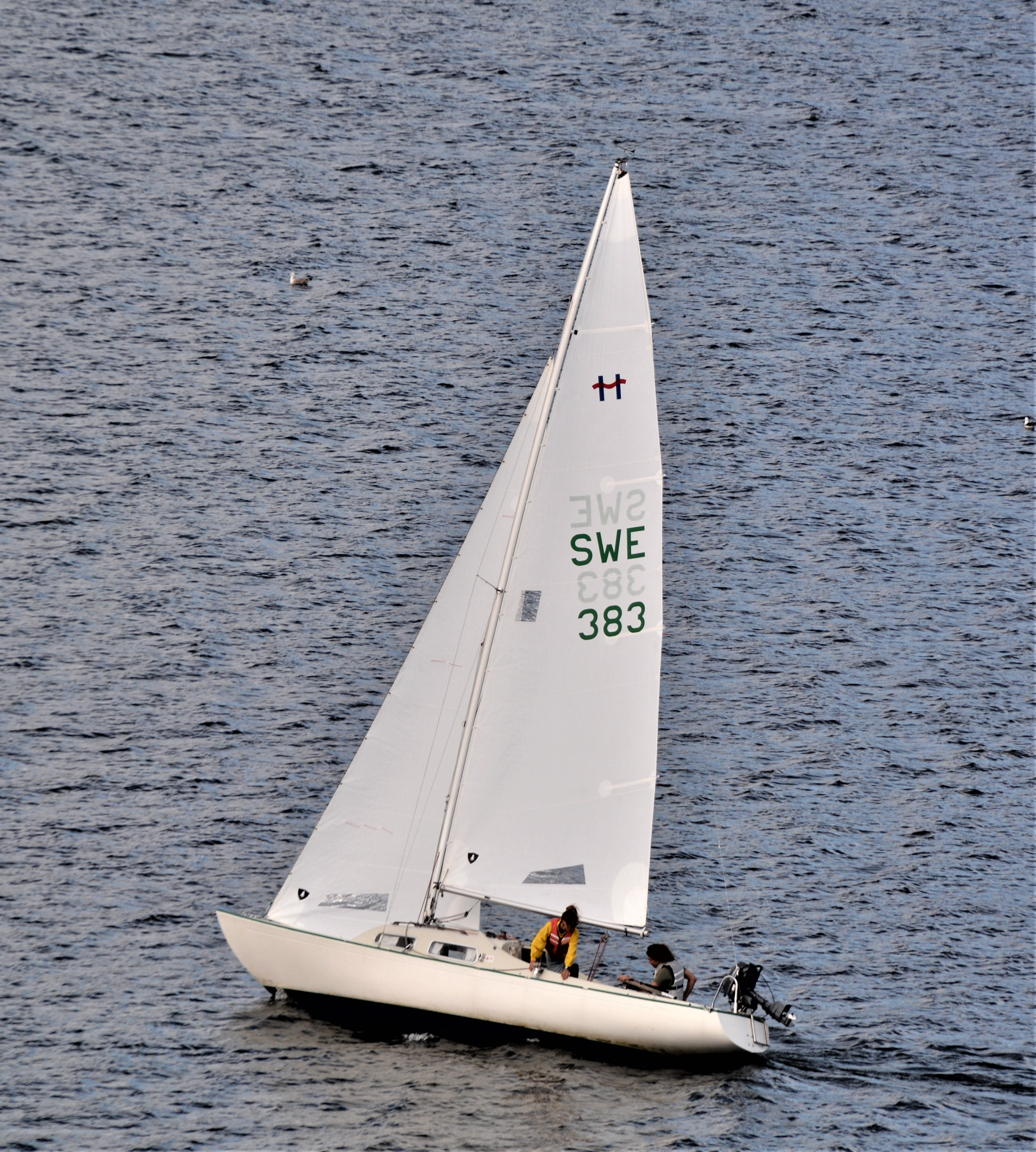
H-boat

The H-Boat is a strict one-design keelboat designed by Finn Hans Groop in 1967, with some minor modifications by Paul Elvstrøm in 1971. The boat gained international status in 1977. Since 1967 over 5000 hulls have been made, making it one of the most popular yacht classes in the world. The boat is mostly sailed and raced in Nordic countries and Central Europe, although there are a few boats in the UK and the US.

The official race crew consists of three persons. Women and juniors are allowed to have a fourth crew member in competitions. The H-boat has sleeping bunks for up to four persons. As a cruising yacht, the boat is suitable for 2-5 persons.

Major manufacturers of H-Boats have been Eagle Marine (Finland), Elvstrøm (Denmark), Scanboat (Åland), Hydrospeed (Finland), Artekno (Finland), Botnia Marin (Finland), O.L. Boats (Denmark), Ott Yacht (Germany) and Frauscher (Austria).

== History ==
The Hans Groop-designed H-boat won a Finnish design competition for a GRP one-design fleet racer with spinnaker in 1967 and production started in 1970 by the Finnish builder Artekno. The H in the name H-boat came from the Greek mythology goddess Hestia. During the first three years, 500 boats were sold. In 1971, Elvstrøm started production of the H-boat with some modifications on rudder and mast and in 1977 Botnia.

== Events ==
=== World Championships ===
The H-boat World Championships has been sailed since 1980.
