= List of North American Championships medalists in sailing =

This is a List of North American Championships medalists in sailing.

== 49er ==
Year	Gold	Silver	Bronze
2016 Newport	United States; Carlos Robles; Trevor Burd	United States; Judge Ryan; Hans Henken	United States; Andrew Mollerus; Matthew Mollerus
2017 Kingston	United States; Nevin Snow; Maximiliano Agnese	Canada; William Jones; Evan DePaul	Canada; Ryan Wood; Andrew Wood

== 49er FX ==
Year	Gold	Silver	Bronze
2016 Newport	Canada; Arielle Morgan; Heather Wyatt	Canada; Alexandra ten Hove; Mariah Millen	United States; Sophie Vinnet; Naomi Flanagan
2017 Kingston	Canada; Erin Rafuse; Danielle Boyd	Spain; Carla Munte; Marta Munte	Japan; Anna Yamazaki; Sena Takano

== 470 ==
Year	Gold	Silver	Bronze
2016 Coconut Grove	United States; Stuart McNay; David Hughes	Brazil; Fernanda Oliveira; Ana Barbachan	Greece; Panagiotis Mantis; Pavlos Kagialis
2017 Coconut Grove	Italy; Giacomo Ferrari; Giulio Calabro	Austria; Matthias Schmid; Lukas Maehr	Spain; Jordi Xammar; Nicolás Rodríguez

== Laser ==
Year	Gold	Silver	Bronze
2016 Cascade Locks	Christopher Barnard (USA)	Erik Bowers (USA)	Max Gallant (CAN)
2017 Vancouver	Malcolm Lamphere (USA)	Marek Zaleski (USA)	Henry Marshall (USA)

== Laser Radial ==
Year	Gold	Silver	Bronze
2016 Cascade Locks	Haddon Hughes (USA)	Corinne Peters (CAN)	Leo Boucher (USA)
2017 Vancouver	Luke Ramsay (CAN)	Sophia Reineke (USA)	Maura Dewey (CAN)

== RS:X ==
=== Men ===
Year	Gold	Silver	Bronze
2017 Miami	Pedro Pascual (USA)	Ignacio Berenguer (MEX)	Juan Bosco Varela Barba (MEX)

=== Women ===
Year	Gold	Silver	Bronze
2017 Miami	Marina Aalabau (ESP)	Bruna Mello (BRA)	Demita Vega (MEX)

== Soling ==
Year	Gold	Silver	Bronze
1969 Milwaukee	United States US 95; John Dane III; Mark Le Blanc; John Cerise	United States Not documented Dick Stearns; Richie Stearns; Bruce Goldsmith	United States Not documented Gordon Lindeman; Not documented Not documented
1970 Houston	United States US 437; Dave Curtis; Robbie Doyle; Ken Cormier	Not documented	Not documented
1971 Los Angeles	United States US 504; Robert Mosbacher; Thad Hutcheson; Tom Dickey	Not documented	Not documented
1972 Oyster Bay	United States US 575; Dave Curtis; Joanne Curtis; John Rousmaniere; John Nystedt	Not documented	Not documented
1973 Toronto	Canada KC 84; Sid Dakin; John Dakin; Peter Crowler	Not documented	Not documented
1974 Milwaukee	United States US 576; John Kolius; Richard Hoepfner; Bill Hunt	Not documented	Not documented
1975 Rochester	Australia KA 128; Dave Forbes; J. Anderson; Dennis o'Neil	Not documented	Not documented
1976 Seattle	United States US 593; Carl Buchan; Mara Buchan; Peter Scorett	Not documented	Not documented
1977 Oyster Bay	Canada KC 151; Hans Fogh; Dennis Toews; John Kerr	Not documented	Not documented
1978 Newport Beach	United States US 707; Robbie Haines; Ed Trevelyan; Vince Brun	Not documented	Not documented
1979 Houston	Canada KC 1 Bill Abbott Jr. Bill Abbott Sr. Phil Bisel	Not documented	Not documented
1980 Chicago	United States US 712; Bill Allen; Dale Hoffman; Brian Porter	Not documented	Not documented
1981 Sarnia	Brazil BL 42; Torben Grael; Daniel Adler; Renaldo Senft	Not documented	Not documented
1982 San Francisco	United States US 745; Ed Baird; Larry Klein; Tucker Edmundson	Not documented	Not documented
1983 Rochester	United States US 757; Buddy Melges; Buddy Melges III; Hans Melges	Not documented	Not documented
1984 Oyster Bay	Canada KC 169; Hans Fogh; Dennis Toews; Steve Calder	Not documented	Not documented
1985 Milwaukee	Canada KC 176; Hans Fogh; Steve Calder; Rob Maru	United States US 706; John Kostecki; Bob Billingham; William Baylis	United States US 758; Brian Porter; Not documented Not documented
1986 Kingston	Canada KC 176; Hans Fogh; Steve Calder; Rob Maru	United States US 777; Dave Curtis; Not documented Not documented	United States US 769; Gerard Coleman; Peter Coleman; Paul Coleman
1987 Santa Cruz	United States US 736; John Kostecki; Bob Billingham; William Baylis	Not documented	Not documented
1988 Wilmette	United States US 787; Kevin Mahaney; Lance Mahaney; Jim Brady	Not documented	Not documented
1989 Annapolis	United States US 787; Kevin Mahaney; Jim Brady; Doug Kern	United States US 786; Dave Curtis; Not documented Not documented	Canada KC 1 Bill Abbott Jr. Not documented Not documented
1990 Tiburon	United States US 786; Dave Curtis; Brad Dellenbaugh; Bob Billingham	New Zealand KZ 16; Dodson; Not documented Not documented	United States US 787; Kevin Mahaney; Jim Brady; Doug Kern
1991 Chicago	United States US 772; Kevin Mahaney; Jim Brady; Doug Kern	United States US 787; John Kostecki; Bob Billingham; William Baylis	Canada KC 182; R. Paul Thompson; Stuart Flinn; Philip Gow
1992 Houston	United States US 801; Larry Klein; Wally Corwin; Steve Burns	United States US 811; Peter Coleman; Paul Coleman; Not documented	Canada KC 196; Bruce Clifford; Christopher Tattersall; Bruce Hitchner
1993 Rochester	United States USA 801; Larry Klein; Wally Corwin; Steve Burns	United States USA 811; Jeff Madrigali; Jim Barton; Kent Massey	Canada CAN 201; Hans Fogh; Philip Gow; Palter
1994 Oyster Bay	Canada CAN 201; Hans Fogh; Thomas Fogh; Simon van Wonderen	United States USA 823; Jeff Madrigali; Jim Barton; Kent Massey	United States USA 811; Peter Coleman; Paul Coleman; Not documented
1995 San Francisco	United States USA 823; Jeff Madrigali; Jim Barton; Kent Massey	United States USA 820; Dave Curtis; Not documented Not documented	United States USA 803; Don Cohan; Not documented Not documented
1996 Marblehead	United States USA 823; Jeff Madrigali; Jim Barton; Kent Massey	Denmark DEN 111; Stig Westergaard; Jens Bojsen-Møller; Jan Eli Andersen	Germany GER 307; Jochen Schumann; Thomas Flach; Bernd Jäkel
1997 Wilmette	United States USA 820; Dave Curtis; Moose McKlintock; Karl Anderson	Canada CAN 1 Bill Abbott Jr. Joanne Abbott; Brad Boston	United States USA 831; Tony Rey; Burnham; Dean Brenner
1998 Rochester	United States USA 823; Jeff Madrigali; Craig Healy; Hartwell Jordan	Canada CAN 214; Hans Fogh; Thomas Fogh; Michener	United States USA 831; Tony Rey; Burnham; Dean Brenner
1999 Toronto	United States USA 820; Dave Curtis; Frank Hart; Dean Brenner	Canada CAN 224; Hans Fogh; Not documented Not documented	Japan JPN 34; Kobun Kuramichi; Not documented Not documented
2000 Annapolis	United States USA 848; Chris Larsen; Karl Anderson; Dave Moffett	Canada CAN 1 Bill Abbott Jr. Goyette; Not documented	United States USA 772; Jeff Gladchun; Norris; Smith
2001 Milwaukee	United States USA 740; Kent Heitzinger; Mike Tennity; Bill Santos	Not documented	Not documented
2002 Wilmette	United States USA 845; Jorgen Johnsson; Martin Johnsson; Mike Leslie	United States USA 832; Charlie Kamps; Jon Bailey; Charley Tollefsen	United States USA 740; Kent Heitzinger; Mike Tennity; Bill Santos
2003 Milwaukee	United States USA 845; Martin Johnsson; Jorgen Johnsson; Augi Hernandez	United States USA 807; Joe Hoeksema; Rose Hoeksema; Michael Wolf	United States USA 832; Charlie Kamps; Vytas Kasniunas; Len Deliceat; George Petritz
2004 Plattsburgh	Canada CAN 1 Bill Abbott Jr. Sarah Tucker; Jim Turvey	United States USA 831; Peter Galloway; Greg Anthony; Paul Steinborn	United States USA 839; Stuart H. Walker; Chris Brown; Bruce Empey
2005 Etobicoke	Canada CAN 1 Bill Abbott Jr. Joanne Abbott; Brad Boston	Canada CAN 230; Hans Fogh; Roger Cheer; John Kerr	Canada CAN 212; Bruce Clifford; Chris Tattersall; Matt Abbott
2006 Milwaukee	United States USA 845; Augi Hernandez; Jorgen Johnsson; Martin Johnsson	United States USA 840; Jim Medley; Marc Hulburt; Chris Roberts	United States USA 832; Charlie Kamps; Vytas Kasniunas; Jon Bailey
2007 Wilmette	Canada CAN 230; Hans Fogh; Roger Cheer; Gord Devries	United States USA 845; Jorgen Johnsson; Martin Johnsson; Augi Hernandez	Canada CAN 225; Peter Hall; Mike Parsons; Jami Allen
2008 Toronto	Canada CAN 230; Hans Fogh; Roger Cheer; Gord Devries	Canada CAN 225; Peter Hall; Philip Kerrigan; T. Park	Canada CAN 211; Kevin Brown; Mark Bird; Stephen Jones
2009 Plattsburgh	Canada CAN 225; Peter Hall; Philip Kerrigan; Gavin Flynn	Canada CAN 230; Hans Fogh; Roger Cheer; Gord Devries	United States USA 839; Stuart H. Walker; Bruce Empey; Doug Loup
2010 Bath	Canada CAN 230; Hans Fogh; Roger Cheer; Gord Devries	United States USA 839; Stuart H. Walker; Bruce Empey; Doug Loup	Canada CAN 225; Peter Hall; Philip Kerrigan; Ross Findlater
2011 Milwaukee	Canada CAN 226; Manfred Kanter; Blair Tully; Tom Freemann	Canada CAN 225; Peter Hall; P. Kerrigan; Mike Parsons	Canada CAN 230; Hans Fogh; John Kerr; Gord Devries
2012 Kingston	Canada CAN 225; Peter Hall; Paul Davis; William Hall	Canada CAN 1 Bill Abbott Jr. Joanne Abbott; Scott Banford	Canada CAN 230; Hans Fogh; John Finch; Gord Devries
2013 Plattsburgh	Canada CAN 230; Hans Fogh; Ross Findlater; Gord Devries	Canada CAN 1 Bill Abbott Jr. Joanne Abbott; Scott Banford	Canada CAN 225; Peter Hall; Steve Lacey; William Hall
2014 Port Stanley	Canada CAN 225; Peter Hall; Paul Davis; William Hall	Canada CAN 1 Bill Abbott Jr. Joanne Abbott; Larry Abbott	Canada CAN 230; Thomas Fogh; Ross Findlater; Gord Devries
2015 Wilmette	Canada CAN 225; Peter Hall; William Hall; Steve Lacey	Canada CAN 230; Thomas Fogh; Ross Findlater; Gord Devries	Germany GER 11; Michael Dietzel; Tim Schutte; Hannes Ramoser
2016 Sarnia	Canada CAN 1 Bill Abbott Jr. Paul Davis; Joanne Abbott	Canada CAN 225; Peter Hall; William Hall; Ross Findlater	Canada CAN 230; Thomas Fogh; Roger Cheer; Gord Devries
2017 Milwaukee	Canada CAN 225; Peter Hall; William Hall; Gord Devries	Germany GER 11; Michael Dietzel; Hannes Ramoser; Connor Clafin	United States USA 816; Ross Richards; Patrick Richards; Drew Kosmoski
2018 Montreal	Canada CAN 231; Manfred Kanter; Anne Marie Willan; Gord Devries	Canada CAN 1 Bill Abbott Jr. Joanne Abbott; Scott McNeil	Canada CAN 225; Peter Hall; William Hall; Steve Lacey
2019 Kingston	Netherlands NED 33; Rudy den Outer; Theo de Lange; Thies Bosch	Canada CAN 1 Bill Abbott Jr. Paul Davis; Joanne Abbott	Canada CAN 225; Peter Hall; William Hall; Scott McNeil
2020 Annapolis			

== Star ==
Year	Gold	Silver	Bronze
1954 Rockport	United States; Jack Van Dyke; Not documented	Not documented	Not documented
2017 Marblehead	United States; Augie Diaz; Bruno Prada	United States; Luke Lawrence; Ian Coleman	United States; George Szabo; Ed Morey
