= Soling North American Championship results (1990–1999) =

Soling
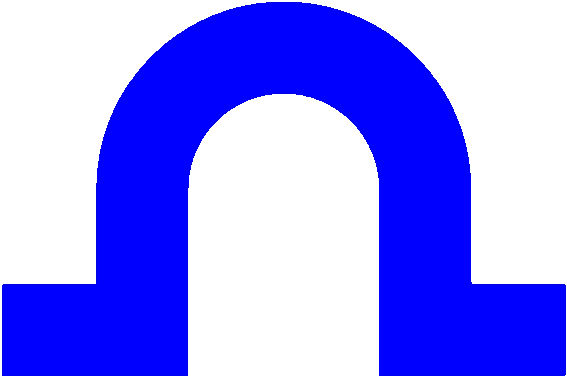

== 1990 Final results ==
1990
Event title
- Edition: 22.
- Host: Tiburon

Event details
- Venue: San Francisco Bay
- Dates: 17 - 21 Sep
- Opening ceremony: 17 Sep

Results
- (gold) Gold: United States; Dave Curtis; Brad Dellenbaugh; Bob Billingham
- (silver) Silver: New Zealand; Tom Dodson; Crew not documented
- (bronze) Bronze: United States; Kevin Mahaney; Jim Brady; Doug Kern

Rank	Country	Helmsman	Crew	Sail No.	Race 1		Race 2		Race 3		Race 4		Race 5		Race 6		Race 7		Total	Total – discard
Rank	Country	Helmsman	Crew	Sail No.	Pos.	Pts.	Pos.	Pts.	Pos.	Pts.	Pos.	Pts.	Pos.	Pts.	Pos.	Pts.	Pos.	Pts.	Total	Total – discard
1st place, gold medalist(s)	USA	Dave Curtis	Brad Dellenbaugh; Bob Billingham	US 786	~~3~~	~~3~~	2	2	1	1	1	1	1	1	2	2	1	1	11	8
2nd place, silver medalist(s)	NZL	Tom Dodson	Not documented	KZ 16	2	2	1	1	~~3~~	~~3~~	2	2	2	2	1	1	2	2	13	10
3rd place, bronze medalist(s)	USA	Kevin Mahaney	Jim Brady; Doug Kern	US 787	1	1	3	3	2	2	3	3	3	3	3	3	~~18~~	~~18~~	33	15
4	USA	Hallman	Not documented	US 779	4	4	~~8~~	~~8~~	7	7	8	8	6	6	4	4	3	3	40	32
5	USA	Doug McLean	Not documented	US 739	6	6	7	7	6	6	5	5	4	4	~~12~~	~~12~~	4	4	44	32
6	USA	Joe Hoeksema	Not documented	US 807	7	7	~~11~~	~~11~~	4	4	4	4	8	8	6	6	6	6	46	35
7	USA	Wills	Not documented	US 757	5	5	8	8	5	5	7	7	5	5	~~20~~	~~20~~	5	5	55	35
8	USA	Hughes	Not documented	US 614	~~11~~	~~11~~	5	5	8	8	9	9	7	7	5	5	8	8	53	42
9	USA	Jim Medley	Not documented	US 701	8	8	9	9	10	10	~~14~~	~~14~~	9	9	9	9	7	7	66	52
10	USA	Wadsworth	Not documented	US 803	10	10	6	6	11	11	6	6	13	13	7	7	~~18~~	~~18~~	71	53

Legend:
Discard is crossed out and does not count for the overall result.
Gender: – male; – female;

- 1990 Progress

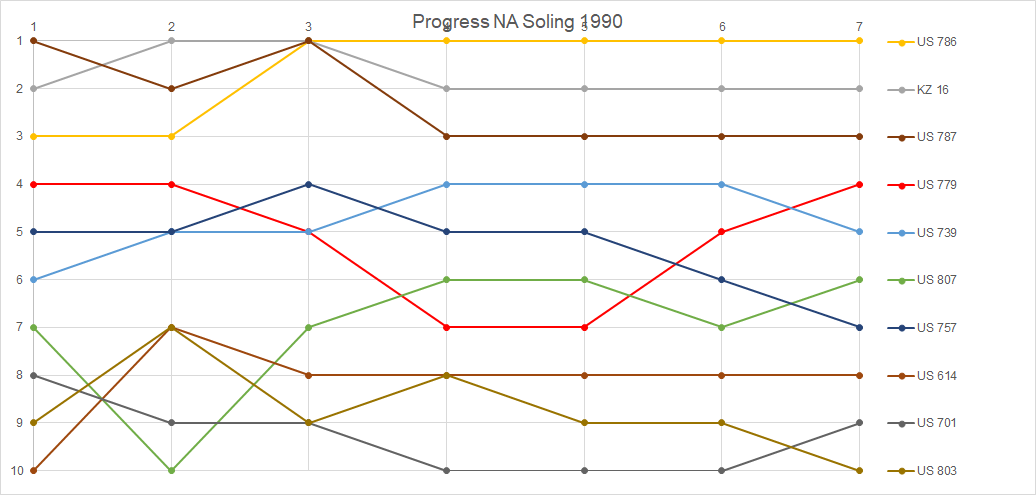

== 1991 Final results ==
1991
Event title
- Edition: 23,
- Host: Chicago Yacht Club

Event details
- Venue: Lake Michigan
- Dates: 5 - 7 Oct
- Yachts: 44
- Opening ceremony: 5 Oct

Competitors
- Competitors: 132
- Competing nations: 3

Results
- (gold) Gold: United States; Kevin Mahaney; Jim Brady; Doug Kern
- (silver) Silver: United States; John Kostecki; Bob Billingham; Will Baylis
- (bronze) Bronze: Canada; Paul Thomson; Stuart Flinn; Philip Gow

Rank	Country	Helmsman	Crew	Sail No.	Race 1		Race 2		Race 3		Race 4		Race 5		Race 6		Race 7		Total	Total – discard
Rank	Country	Helmsman	Crew	Sail No.	Pos.	Pts.	Pos.	Pts.	Pos.	Pts.	Pos.	Pts.	Pos.	Pts.	Pos.	Pts.	Pos.	Pts.	Total	Total – discard
1st place, gold medalist(s)	USA	Kevin Mahaney	Jim Brady; Doug Kern	US 772	2	2	1	1	7	7	1	1	1	1	1	1	~~DNC~~	~~45~~	58	13
2nd place, silver medalist(s)	USA	John Kostecki	Bob Billingham; Will Baylis	US 787	3	3	4	4	4	4	2	2	~~7~~	~~7~~	4	4	4	4	28	21
3rd place, bronze medalist(s)	CAN	Paul Thomson	Stuart Flinn; Philip Gow	KC 182	4	4	~~6~~	~~6~~	6	6	6	6	3	3	3	3	3	3	31	25
4	USA	Gerard Coleman	Peter Coleman; Paul Coleman	US 769	6	6	2	2	1	1	11	11	4	4	6	6	~~32~~	~~32~~	62	30
5	USA	Larry Klein	Not documented	US 801	1	1	~~9~~	~~9~~	2	2	5	5	8	8	8	8	8	8	41	32
6	CAN	Hans Fogh	Not documented	KC 181	8	8	5	5	~~35~~	~~35~~	3	3	5	5	11	11	1	1	68	33
7	USA	Dave Curtis	Not documented	US 786	7	7	3	3	12	12	~~14~~	~~14~~	2	2	5	5	5	5	48	34
8	NZL	Russell Coutts	Not documented	KZ 20	5	5	7	7	10	10	4	4	10	10	2	2	~~DSQ~~	~~45~~	83	38
9	USA	Hallman	Not documented	US 779	10	10	11	11	13	13	7	7	6	6	~~DNC~~	~~45~~	9	9	101	56
10	USA	Joe Hoeksema	Not documented	US 807	17	17	15	15	5	5	~~22~~	~~22~~	11	11	7	7	7	7	84	62
11	USA	B. Wadsworth	Not documented	US 803	14	14	13	13	~~29~~	~~29~~	9	9	9	9	12	12	6	6	92	63
12	CAN	Erik Koppernaes	Not documented	KC 194	11	11	10	10	11	11	13	13	12	12	9	9	~~17~~	~~17~~	83	66
13	CAN	T. Otton	Not documented	KC 196	15	15	~~22~~	~~22~~	3	3	10	10	19	19	17	17	13	13	99	77
14	USA	Charlie Kamps	Not documented	US 808	9	9	19	19	18	18	~~24~~	~~24~~	13	13	10	10	12	12	105	81
15	CAN	Peter Hall	Not documented	KC 197	19	19	14	14	8	8	17	17	~~20~~	~~20~~	13	13	11	11	102	82
16	USA	P. Merrifield	Not documented	US 809	12	12	8	8	20	20	8	8	18	18	19	19	~~21~~	~~21~~	106	85
17	CAN	Jim Beatty	Not documented	KC 185	16	16	17	17	16	16	~~21~~	~~21~~	14	14	15	15	14	14	113	92
18	USA	M. Huges	Not documented	US 614	13	13	~~DSQ~~	~~45~~	15	15	15	15	15	15	14	14	24	24	141	96
19	USA	Jerry Castle	Not documented	US 726	18	18	21	21	~~27~~	~~27~~	16	16	16	16	16	16	18	18	132	105
20	USA	Fred Joosten	Not documented	US 759	20	20	~~DSQ~~	~~45~~	21	21	12	12	17	17	20	20	22	22	157	112
21	USA	B. Chandler	Not documented	US 796	22	22	12	12	26	26	25	25	~~DNF~~	~~45~~	18	18	16	16	164	119
22	USA	Kent Heitzinger	Not documented	US 785	37	37	18	18	14	14	18	18	21	21	~~DNC~~	~~45~~	15	15	168	123
23	USA	J. Johnson	Not documented	US 431	~~26~~	~~26~~	25	25	22	22	23	23	22	22	22	22	19	19	159	133
24	USA	B. Gondran	Not documented	US 794	23	23	16	16	23	23	19	19	26	26	27	27	~~DNF~~	~~45~~	179	134
25	USA	W. Tone	Not documented	US 677	~~30~~	~~30~~	26	26	17	17	30	30	23	23	25	25	20	20	171	141
26	USA	Mike Tennity	Not documented	US 790	27	27	~~30~~	~~30~~	25	25	20	20	25	25	21	21	23	23	171	141
27	USA	R. Draftz	Not documented	US 731	21	21	28	28	34	34	27	27	24	24	24	24	~~28~~	~~28~~	186	152
28	USA	G. Winters	Not documented	US 541	29	29	33	33	19	19	~~34~~	~~34~~	33	33	29	29	25	25	202	168
29	USA	Don Crysdale	Not documented	US 763	~~38~~	~~38~~	31	31	24	24	28	28	35	35	30	30	27	27	213	175
30	USA	K. Kondo	Not documented	US 700	~~35~~	~~35~~	34	34	30	30	32	32	27	27	31	31	29	29	218	183
31	USA	M. Slater	Not documented	US 682	34	34	27	27	~~DSQ~~	~~45~~	31	31	28	28	DNC	45	26	26	236	191
32	USA	G. January	Not documented	US 718	31	31	35	35	37	37	~~39~~	~~39~~	32	32	26	26	36	36	236	197
33	USA	Steve Bobo	Not documented	US 605	~~DNC~~	~~45~~	40	40	28	28	36	36	31	31	28	28	35	35	243	198
34	USA	B. Baldino	Not documented	US 645	33	33	37	37	~~DNF~~	~~45~~	40	40	29	29	23	23	37	37	244	199
35	USA	W. Slaght	Not documented	US 628	25	25	~~38~~	~~38~~	38	38	38	38	34	34	32	32	31	31	236	211
36	USA	R. Strilky	Not documented	US 776	36	36	29	29	33	33	26	26	~~DNF~~	~~45~~	DNC	45	DNC	45	259	214
37	USA	S. Tapas	Not documented	US 689	32	32	42	42	31	31	41	41	36	36	~~DNF~~	~~45~~	34	34	261	216
38	CAN	D. Walters	Not documented	KC 171	39	39	39	39	39	39	33	33	30	30	~~DNC~~	~~45~~	38	38	263	218
39	USA	D. Williams	Not documented	US 758	28	28	32	32	36	36	37	37	~~DNC~~	~~45~~	DNC	45	DNC	45	268	223
40	USA	J. Lane	Not documented	US 646	24	24	24	24	~~DNC~~	~~45~~	DNC	45	DNC	45	DNC	45	DNC	45	273	228
41	USA	J. Warren	Not documented	US 750	41	41	36	36	32	32	~~RET~~	~~45~~	DNC	45	DNC	45	30	30	274	229
42	USA	T. Herr	Not documented	US 631	40	40	41	41	41	41	35	35	~~DNC~~	~~45~~	DNF	45	33	33	280	235
43	CAN	J. McCully	Not documented	KC 193	42	42	43	43	40	40	42	42	~~DNC~~	~~45~~	DNC	45	DNC	45	302	257
44	USA	R. Zieserl	Not documented	US 737	~~DNC~~	~~45~~	DNC	45	DNC	45	DNC	45	DNC	45	DNC	45	32	32	302	257

Legend: DNC – Did not come to the starting area; DNF – Did not finish; DSQ – Disqualified;
Discard is crossed out and does not count for the overall result.
Gender: – male; – female;

- 1991 Progress

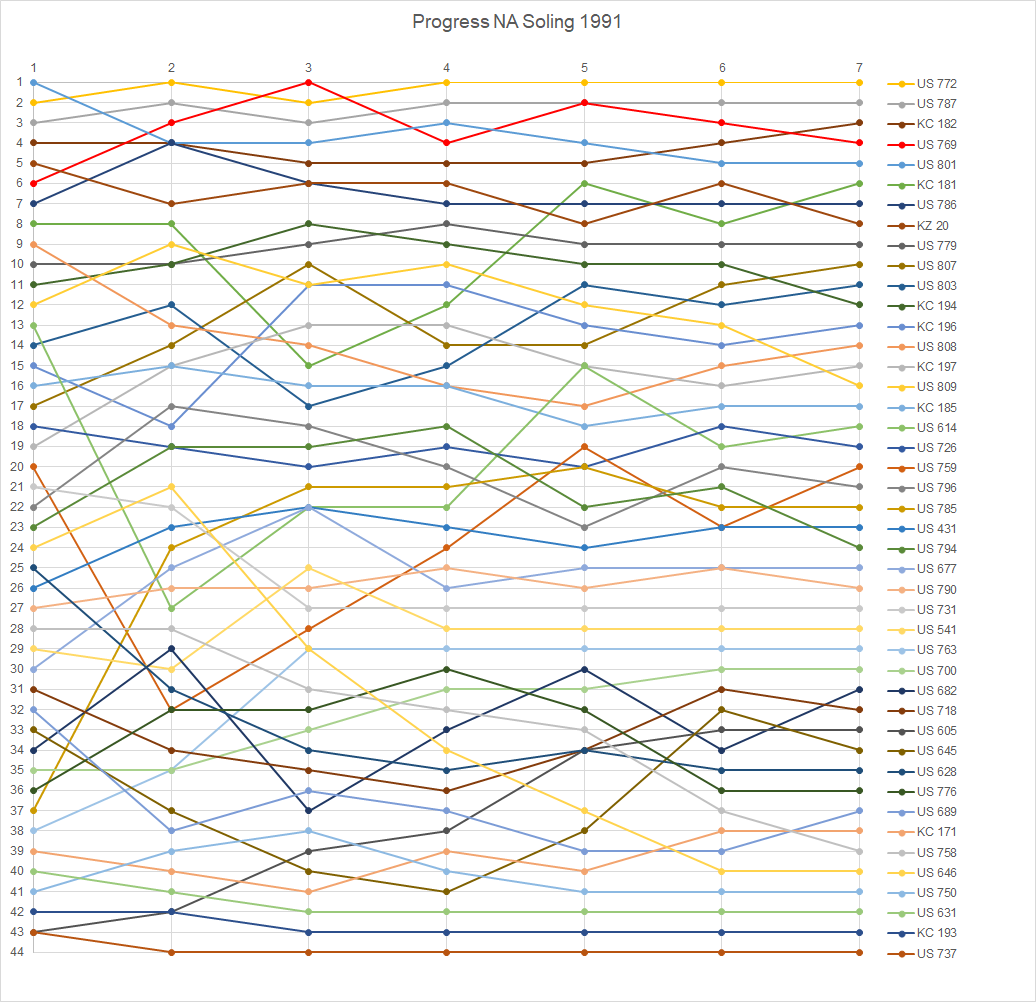

== 1992 Final results ==
1992
Event title
- Edition: 24.
- Host: Houston

Event details
- Venue: Galveston Bay
- Dates: 1 - 4 Sep
- Yachts: 15
- Opening ceremony: 1 Sep

Competitors
- Competitors: 45
- Competing nations: 2

Results
- (gold) Gold: United States; Larry Klein; Wally Corwin; Steve Burns
- (silver) Silver: United States; John Kostecki; Bob Billingham; Will Baylis
- (bronze) Bronze: United States; Peter Coleman; Paul Coleman; Not documented

Rank	Country	Helmsman	Crew	Sail No.	Race 1		Race 2		Race 3		Race 4		Race 5		Race 6		Total	Total – discard
Rank	Country	Helmsman	Crew	Sail No.	Pos.	Pts.	Pos.	Pts.	Pos.	Pts.	Pos.	Pts.	Pos.	Pts.	Pos.	Pts.	Total	Total – discard
1st place, gold medalist(s)	USA	Larry Klein	Wally Corwin; Steve Burns	US 801	1	1	1	1	2	2	1	1	~~8~~	~~8~~	2	2	15	7
2nd place, silver medalist(s)	USA	Peter Coleman	Paul Coleman; Not documented	US 811	4	4	~~5~~	~~5~~	3	3	2	2	3	3	1	1	18	13
3rd place, bronze medalist(s)	CAN	Bruce Clifford	Christopher Tattersall; Bruce Hitcher	KC 198	~~7~~	~~7~~	7	7	1	1	5	5	2	2	3	3	25	18
4	USA	Y. Rogers	Not documented	US 747	3	3	~~6~~	~~6~~	4	4	3	3	4	4	5	5	25	19
5	USA	M. Hallmann	Not documented	US 614	2	2	2	2	5	5	6	6	8	8	~~10~~	~~10~~	33	23
6	USA	Charlie Kamps	Not documented	US 802	9	9	~~13~~	~~13~~	8	8	7	7	1	1	4	4	42	29
7	USA	Kent Heitzinger	Not documented	US 785	6	6	3	3	7	7	4	4	11	11	~~12~~	~~12~~	43	31
8	USA	Doug McLean	Not documented	US 805	5	5	4	4	6	6	10	10	~~12~~	~~12~~	8	8	45	33
9	USA	T. Smythe	Not documented	US 710	10	10	9	9	~~13~~	~~13~~	8	8	7	7	6	6	53	40
10	USA	B. Hunt	Not documented	US 766	8	8	~~10~~	~~10~~	10	10	9	9	9	9	7	7	53	43

Legend: DNC – Did not come to the starting area; DNF – Did not finish; DSQ – Disqualified; PMS – Premature start;
Discard is crossed out and does not count for the overall result.
Gender: – male; – female;

- 1992 Progress

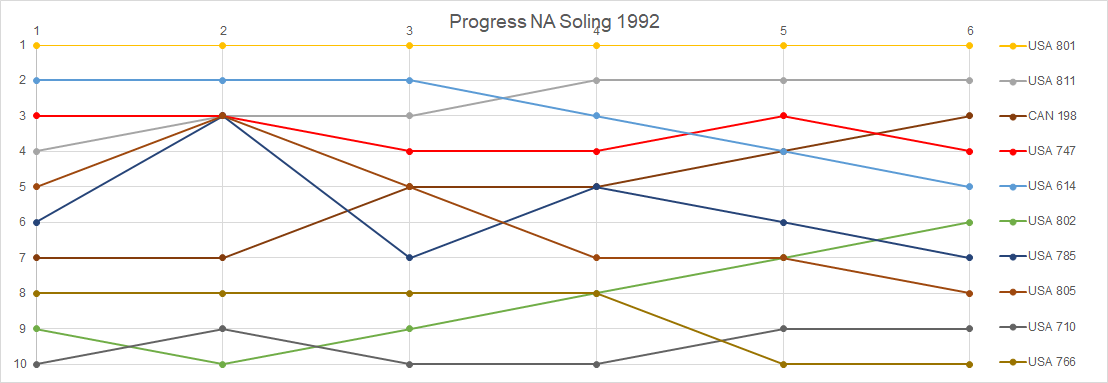

== 1993 Final results ==
1993
Event title
- Edition: 25,
- Host: Rochester Yacht Club

Event details
- Venue: Lake Ontario
- Dates: 5 - 9 Jul
- Yachts: 32
- Opening ceremony: 5 Jul

Competitors
- Competitors: 96
- Competing nations: 2

Results
- (gold) Gold: United States; Larry Klein; Wally Corwin; Steve Burns
- (silver) Silver: United States; Jeff Madrigali; Jim Barton; Kent Massey
- (bronze) Bronze: Canada; Hans Fogh; Philip Gow; Palter

Rank	Country	Helmsman	Crew	Sail No.	Race 1		Race 2		Race 3		Race 4		Race 5		Race 6		Race 7		Race 8		Race 9		Total	Total – discard
Rank	Country	Helmsman	Crew	Sail No.	Pos.	Pts.	Pos.	Pts.	Pos.	Pts.	Pos.	Pts.	Pos.	Pts.	Pos.	Pts.	Pos.	Pts.	Pos.	Pts.	Pos.	Pts.	Total	Total – discard
1st place, gold medalist(s)	USA	Larry Klein	Wally Corwin; Steve Burns	USA 801	1	1	9	9	1	1	~~16~~	~~16~~	5	5	1	1	3	1	~~10~~	~~10~~	1	1	47	21
2nd place, silver medalist(s)	USA	Jeff Madrigali	Jim Barton; Kent Massey	USA 743	~~PMS~~	~~33~~	4	4	4	4	~~11~~	~~11~~	4	4	5	5	4	3	5	5	3	3	73	29
3rd place, bronze medalist(s)	CAN	Hans Fogh	Philip Gow; Palter	CAN 201	~~PMS~~	~~33~~	3	3	~~21~~	~~21~~	15	15	1	1	3	3	1	6	2	2	6	6	85	31
4	USA	Dave Curtis	Steve Calder; McKegney	USA 786	6	6	2	2	~~8~~	~~8~~	3	3	2	2	~~7~~	~~7~~	9	7	7	7	7	7	51	34
5	USA	Doug McLean	Zambrinski; Smith	USA 805	~~13~~	~~13~~	1	1	~~20~~	~~20~~	4	4	6	6	9	9	14	9	6	6	9	9	82	48
6	CAN	Erik Koppernaes	Creaser; Stuart Flinn	CAN 194	8	8	6	6	~~17~~	~~17~~	~~32~~	~~32~~	7	7	10	10	5	2	13	13	2	2	100	51
7	USA	Peter Coleman	Paul Coleman; Manion	USA 811	10	10	~~17~~	~~17~~	2	2	1	1	13	13	4	4	~~5~~	~~17~~	17	17	17	17	86	52
8	CAN	Bruce Clifford	Tattersall; Matt Abbott	CAN 202	3	3	7	7	~~24~~	~~24~~	17	17	10	10	8	8	~~12~~	~~18~~	1	1	18	18	100	58
9	USA	Rogers	Not documented	USA 747	18	18	10	10	~~PMS~~	~~33~~	5	5	3	3	2	2	13	10	~~21~~	~~21~~	10	10	115	61
10	CAN	Jim Beatty	Yuill; Matile	CAN 204	14	14	15	15	10	10	5	5	9	9	6	6	2	26	~~PMS~~	~~33~~	~~26~~	~~26~~	120	61

Legend: DNC – Did not come to the starting area; DNF – Did not finish; DSQ – Disqualified; PMS – Premature start;
Discard is crossed out and does not count for the overall result.
Gender: – male; – female;

- 1993 Progress

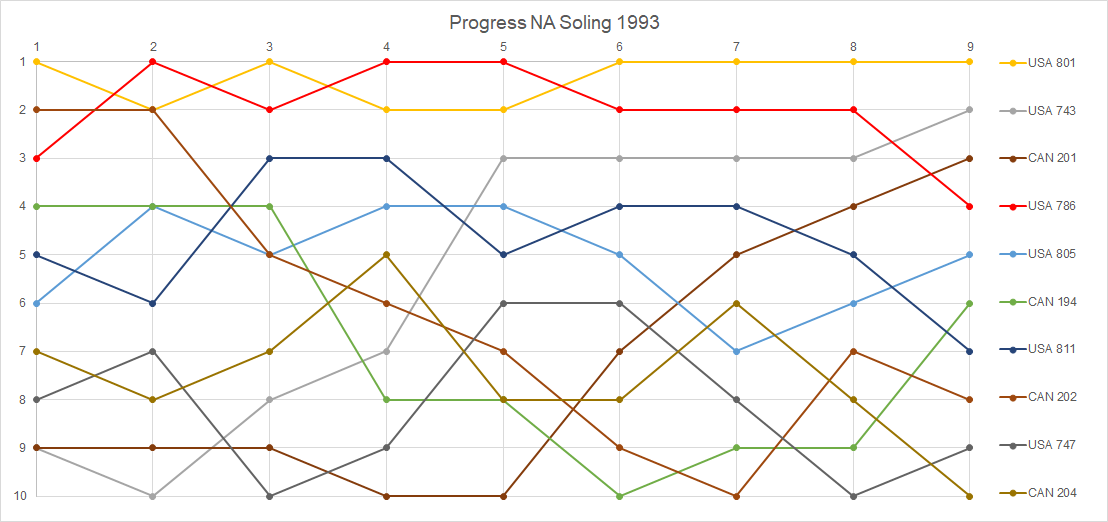

== 1994 Final results ==
1994
Event title
- Edition: 26,
- Host: Seawanhaka Corinthian Yacht Club

Event details
- Venue: Oyster Bay, New York
- Dates: 29 Sep – 2 Oct
- Opening ceremony: 29 Sep

Results
- (gold) Gold: Canada; Hans Fogh; Thomas Fogh; Simon van Wonderen
- (silver) Silver: United States; Jeff Madrigali; Jim Barton; Kent Massey
- (bronze) Bronze: United States; Peter Coleman; Peter Coleman; Not documented

Rank	Country	Helmsman	Crew	Sail No.	Race	
Rank	Country	Helmsman	Crew	Sail No.	Pos.	Pts.
1st place, gold medalist(s)	CAN	Hans Fogh	Thomas Fogh; Simon van Wonderen	CAN		
2nd place, silver medalist(s)	USA	Jeff Madrigali	Jim Barton; Kent Massey	USA		
3rd place, bronze medalist(s)	USA	Peter Coleman	Peter Coleman; Not documented	USA		
4	CAN	Bill Abbott Jr.	Not documented	CAN 1		
5	CAN	Bruce Clifford	Not documented	CAN		
6	USA	Doug McLean	Not documented	USA		
7	USA	Don Cohan	Not documented	USA		
8	USA	Charlie Kamps	Not documented	USA		
9	USA	Dave Curtis	Not documented	USA		
10	USA	David Baum	Not documented	USA		
11	USA	Kent Heitzinger	Not documented	USA		
12	USA	Michael Botz	Not documented	USA		
13	USA	John Hoesch	Not documented	USA		
14	USA	Fred Seeley	Not documented	USA		

Legend: DNC – Did not come to the starting area; DSQ – Disqualified; RET – Retired;
Discard is crossed out and does not count for the overall result.
Gender: – male; – female;

- 1994 Progress

Not sufficient documentation to produce process 1994!

== 1995 Final results ==
1995
Event title
- Edition: 27,

Event details
- Venue: San Francisco Bay
- Dates: 2 – 6 Oct
- Yachts: 16
- Opening ceremony: 2 Oct

Competitors
- Competitors: 48
- Competing nations: 4

Results
- (gold) Gold: United States; Jeff Madrigali; Jim Barton; Kent Massey
- (silver) Silver: United States; Dave Curtis; Crew not documented
- (bronze) Bronze: United States; Don Cohan; Crew not documented

Rank	Country	Helmsman	Crew	Sail No.	Race 1		Race 2		Race 3		Race 4		Race 5		Race 6		Race 7		Race 8		Total	Total – discard
Rank	Country	Helmsman	Crew	Sail No.	Pos.	Pts.	Pos.	Pts.	Pos.	Pts.	Pos.	Pts.	Pos.	Pts.	Pos.	Pts.	Pos.	Pts.	Pos.	Pts.	Total	Total – discard
1st place, gold medalist(s)	USA	Jeff Madrigali	Jim Barton; Kent Massey	USA 823	2	2	4	4	~~7~~	~~7~~	2	2	1	1	2	2	2	2	1	1	21	14
2nd place, silver medalist(s)	USA	Dave Curtis	Not documented	USA 820	1	1	1	1	5	5	4	4	2	2	3	3	~~PMS~~	~~17~~	2	2	35	18
3rd place, bronze medalist(s)	USA	Don Cohan	Not documented	USA 803	~~7~~	~~7~~	2	2	2	2	1	1	3	3	1	1	5	5	5	5	26	19
4	NOR	Herman Horn Johannessen	Paul Davis; Espen Stokkeland	NOR 116	6	6	6	6	1	1	~~PMS~~	~~17~~	6	6	5	5	1	1	3	3	45	28
5	USA	John Kolius	Not documented	USA 827	3	3	~~2~~	~~8~~	3	3	6	6	5	5	4	4	3	3	4	4	36	28
6	NZL	Kelvin Harrap	Sean Clarkson; Jamie Gale	NZL 1	4	4	3	3	6	6	5	5	7	7	~~8~~	~~8~~	6	6	6	6	45	37
7	CAN	Bruce Clifford	Not documented	CAN 212	5	5	5	5	~~11~~	~~11~~	3	3	10	10	6	6	4	4	9	9	53	42
8	CAN	Bill Abbott Jr.	Not documented	CAN 1	8	8	7	7	4	4	8	8	4	4	~~9~~	~~9~~	7	7	8	8	55	46
9	USA	Michael Butz	Not documented	USA 824	10	10	9	9	8	8	9	9	8	8	7	7	8	8	~~11~~	~~11~~	70	59
10	USA	Terence Glacklin	Not documented	USA 822	12	12	10	10	10	10	7	7	~~13~~	~~13~~	12	12	12	12	7	7	83	70
11	USA	Wareham	Not documented	USA 787	13	13	12	12	9	9	~~PMS~~	~~17~~	9	9	13	13	10	10	10	10	93	76
12	USA	Wilson	Not documented	USA 756	9	9	~~13~~	~~13~~	12	12	12	12	12	12	10	10	9	9	12	12	89	76
13	USA	Jim Medley	Not documented	USA 781	11	11	11	11	~~14~~	~~14~~	10	10	11	11	11	11	11	11	13	13	92	78
14	USA	Hedreck	Not documented	USA 754	~~14~~	~~14~~	14	14	13	13	11	11	14	14	14	14	13	13	14	14	107	93
15	ISV	John Morgan	Not documented	ISV 1	15	15	15	15	~~DNF~~	~~17~~	DNF	17	15	15	15	15	14	14	DNS	17	125	108
16	USA	Super	Not documented	USA 595	16	16	~~DNF~~	~~17~~	15	15	DNF	17	DNS	17	DNS	17	DNS	17	DNS	17	133	116

Legend: DNC – Did not come to the starting area; DSQ – Disqualified; RET – Retired;
Discard is crossed out and does not count for the overall result.
Gender: – male; – female;

- 1995 Progress

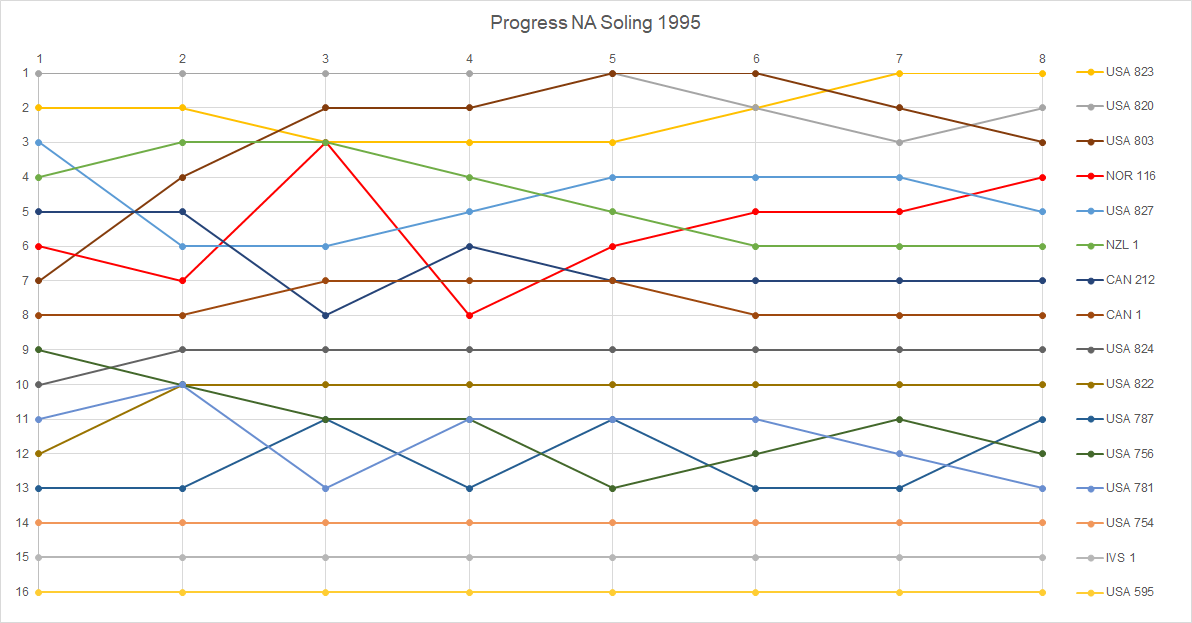

== 1996 Final results ==
1996
Event title
- Edition: 28,
- Host: Eastern Yacht Club

Event details
- Venue: Atlantic Ocean
- Dates: 24 – 28 Jun
- Yachts: 29
- Opening ceremony: 24 Jun

Competitors
- Competitors: 87
- Competing nations: 18

Results
- (gold) Gold: United States; Jeff Madrigali; Jim Barton; Kent Massey
- (silver) Silver: Denmark; Stig Westergaard; Jens Bojsen-Møller; Jan Anderson
- (bronze) Bronze: Germany; Jochen Schümann; Thomas Flach; Bernd Jäkel

Rank	Country	Helmsman	Crew	Sail No.	Race 1		Race 2		Race 3		Race 4		Race 5		Race 6		Total	Total – discard
Rank	Country	Helmsman	Crew	Sail No.	Pos.	Pts.	Pos.	Pts.	Pos.	Pts.	Pos.	Pts.	Pos.	Pts.	Pos.	Pts.	Total	Total – discard
1st place, gold medalist(s)	USA	Jeff Madrigali	Jim Barton; Kent Massey	USA 823	~~6~~	~~6~~	1	1	4	4	4	4	2	2	2	2	19	13
2nd place, silver medalist(s)	DEN	Stig Westergaard	Jens Bojsen-Møller; Jan Anderson	DEN 111	1	1	3	3	5	5	2	2	~~9~~	~~9~~	9	9	29	20
3rd place, bronze medalist(s)	GER	Jochen Schümann	Thomas Flach; Bernd Jäkel	GER 307	4	4	2	2	~~7~~	~~7~~	3	3	5	5	7	7	28	21
4	GBR	Andrew Beadsworth	Barry Parkin; Adrian George Stead	GBR 7	2	2	8	8	3	3	5	5	~~15~~	~~15~~	6	6	39	24
5	NOR	Herman Horn Johannessen	Paul Davis; Espen Stokkeland	NOR 116	5	5	6	6	2	2	~~13~~	~~13~~	13	13	4	4	43	30
6	RUS	Georgy Shayduko	Dmitry Shabanov; Igor Skalin	RUS 44	9	9	9	9	1	1	1	1	~~18~~	~~18~~	17	17	55	37
7	RSA	Bruce Savage	Richard Mayhew; Clynton Wade Lehman	RSA11	8	8	~~PMS~~	~~30~~	9	9	7	7	16	16	1	1	71	41
8	IRL	Marshall King	Garrett Connolly; Daniel O'grady	IRL 3	1	1	~~13~~	~~13~~	6	6	11	11	6	6	8	8	45	32
9	JPN	Kazunori Komatsu	Masatoshi Hazama; Kazuyuki Hyodo	JPN 35	15	15	~~16~~	~~16~~	8	8	9	9	1	1	10	10	59	43
10	AUS	Matt Hayes	Steve Jarvin; Stephen McConaghy	AUS 174	11	11	4	4	~~PMS~~	~~30~~	6	6	11	11	11	11	73	43
11	USA	Dave Curtis	Philip Gow; Crawford	USA 820	16	16	15	15	~~PMS~~	~~30~~	10	10	3	3	3	3	77	47
12	FRA	Marc Bouet	Sylvain Chtounder; Gildas Morvan	FRA 1	3	3	~~14~~	~~14~~	13	13	8	8	10	10	14	14	62	48
13	NED	Willem Potma	Frank Hettinga; Gerhard Potma	NED 31	~~14~~	~~14~~	5	5	12	12	14	14	7	7	13	13	65	51
14	CAN	Bill Abbott Jr.	Joanne Abbott; Brad Boston	CAN 1	13	13	10	10	17	17	~~19~~	~~19~~	8	8	5	5	72	53
15	ESP	Luis Doreste	Domingo Manrique; David Vera	ESP 183	12	12	~~PMS~~	~~30~~	10	10	15	15	4	4	16	16	87	57
16	NZL	Kelvin Harrap	Sean Clarkson; Jamie Gale	NZL 20	~~21~~	~~21~~	7	7	18	18	12	12	12	12	15	15	85	64
17	CAN	Hans Fogh	John Kerr; Hank Lammens	CAN 211	7	7	11	11	19	19	~~20~~	~~20~~	17	17	12	12	86	66
18	HUN	George Wossala	Lászió Kovaácsi; Károly Vezér	HUN 77	18	18	12	12	13	13	~~22~~	~~22~~	14	14	20	20	99	77
19	BRA	Edson,Jr. Araujo	Daniel Glomb; Marcelo Reitz	BRA 45	17	17	17	17	~~PMS~~	~~30~~	16	16	19	19	19	19	118	88
20	USA	Charlie Kamps	Graves; Gleits	USA 832	23	23	19	19	11	11	21	21	23	23	~~DNF~~	~~30~~	127	97
21	USA	Don Cohan	Anderson; Olsen	USA 803	19	19	20	20	~~23~~	~~23~~	17	17	21	21	21	21	121	98
22	USA	Wilson	Mattison; Culd	USA 756	22	22	18	18	21	21	18	18	~~24~~	~~24~~	24	24	127	103
23	USA	Stuart H. Walker	Allan; McKhann	USA 725	24	24	21	21	14	14	24	24	~~25~~	~~25~~	22	22	130	105
24	HUN	Szabolcs Detre	Zsolt Detre; Timar	HUN 107	20	20	~~DSQ~~	~~30~~	PMS	30	23	23	22	22	18	18	143	113
25	CAN	Cormier	McCully; Zeuli	CAN 193	~~26~~	~~26~~	22	22	25	25	25	25	20	20	23	23	141	115
26	USA	Hedrick	Kelly; Armstrong	USA 794	25	25	23	23	16	16	26	26	26	26	~~DNS~~	~~30~~	146	116
27	USA	O'Donnell	Randall; Hamlet	USA 755	27	27	24	24	24	24	~~28~~	~~28~~	27	27	25	25	155	127
28	USA	Erikson	Edens; Ryan	USA 678	~~DNF~~	~~30~~	DNS	30	20	20	27	27	28	28	DNF	30	165	135
29	ISV	John Morgan	Morgan; Morgan	ISV 1	~~DNS~~	~~30~~	DNS	30	22	22	DNF	30	29	29	26	26	167	137

Legend: DNC – Did not come to the starting area; DSQ – Disqualified; PMS – Premature start; RET – Retired;
Discard is crossed out and does not count for the overall result.
Gender: – male; – female;

- 1996 Progress

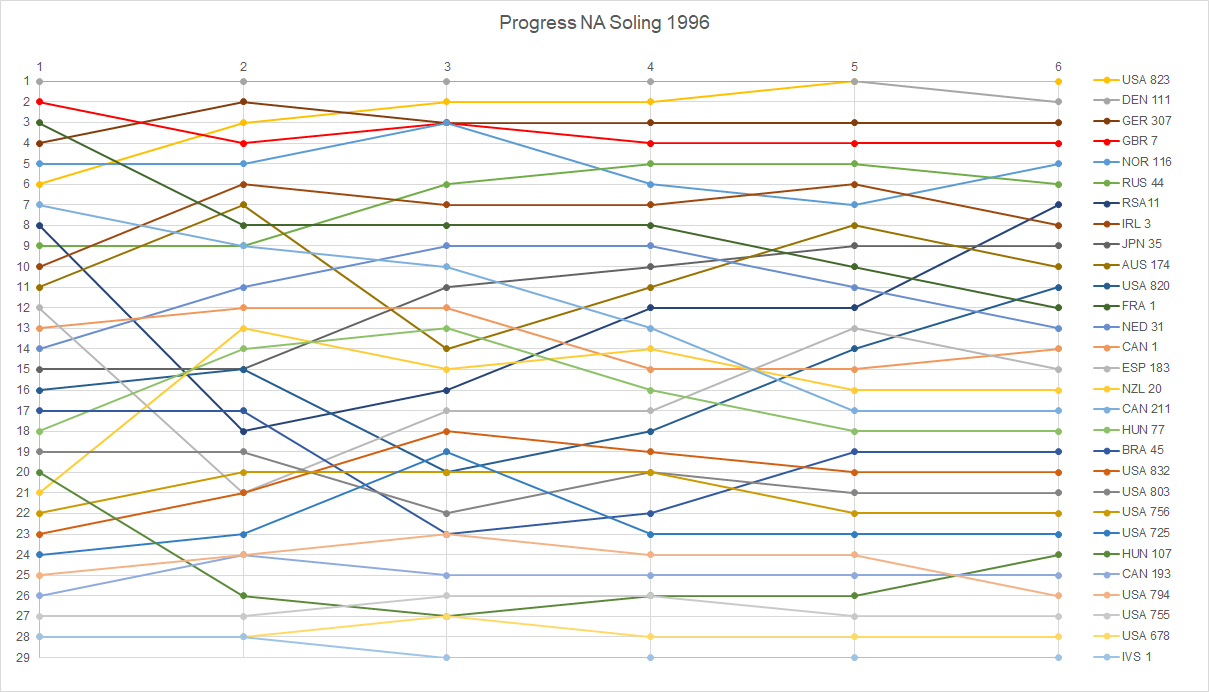

== 1997 Final results ==
1997
Event title
- Edition: 29,
- Host: Wilmette Yacht Club

Event details
- Venue: Lake Michigan
- Dates: 18 – 21 Sep
- Yachts: 34
- Opening ceremony: 18 Sep

Competitors
- Competitors: 102
- Competing nations: 4

Results
- (gold) Gold: United States; Dave Curtis; Moose McKlintock; Karl Anderson
- (silver) Silver: Canada; Bill Abbott Jr. Joanne Abbott; Brad Boston
- (bronze) Bronze: United States; Tony Rey; Burnham; Dean Brenner

Rank	Country	Helmsman	Crew	Sail No.	Race 1		Race 2		Race 3		Race 4		Race 5		Race 6		Race 7		Total	Total – discard
Rank	Country	Helmsman	Crew	Sail No.	Pos.	Pts.	Pos.	Pts.	Pos.	Pts.	Pos.	Pts.	Pos.	Pts.	Pos.	Pts.	Pos.	Pts.	Total	Total – discard
1st place, gold medalist(s)	USA	Dave Curtis	Moose McKlintock; Karl Anderson	USA 820	2	2	1	1	5	5	2	2	1	1	2	2	~~DNC~~	~~35~~	48.0	13.0
2nd place, silver medalist(s)	CAN	Bill Abbott Jr.	Joanne Abbott; Brad Boston	CAN 1	4	4	~~10~~	~~10~~	3	3	3	3	4	4	1	1	1	1	26.0	16.0
3rd place, bronze medalist(s)	USA	Tony Rey	Burnham; Dean Brenner	USA 831	3	3	4	4	~~6~~	~~6~~	4	4	6	6	3	3	3	3	29.0	23.0
4	CAN	Hans Fogh	Not documented	CAN 214	1	1	6	6	1	1	~~7~~	~~7~~	5	5	5	5	6	6	31.0	24.0
5	USA	Don Cohan	Not documented	USA 833	7	7	5	5	2	2	~~12~~	~~12~~	7	7	4	4	2	2	39.0	27.0
6	CAN	John Finch	Not documented	CAN 211	5	5	7	7	4	4	1	1	~~8~~	~~8~~	7	7	5	5	37.0	29.0
7	USA	Kent Heitzinger	Not documented	USA 825	~~RET~~	~~35~~	3	3	7	7	5	5	3	3	6	6	7	7	66.0	31.0
8	CAN	Rich Clark	Not documented	CAN 210	8	8	2	2	9	9	9	9	2	2	8	8	~~10~~	~~10~~	48.0	38.0
9	CAN	Nigel Cochrane	Not documented	CAN 17	6	6	~~DNF~~	~~35~~	10	10	6	6	10	10	10	10	9	9	86.0	51.0
10	USA	John Horsch	Not documented	USA 834	6	6	8	8	~~13~~	~~13~~	11	11	9	9	9	9	12	12	68.0	55.0
11	USA	Rich Stearns	Not documented	USA 818	YMP	10.6	9	9	8	8	14	14	11	11	11	11	~~15~~	~~15~~	78.6	63.6
12	USA	Charlie Kamps	Not documented	USA 832	~~DNF~~	~~35~~	11	11	11	11	8	8	14	14	19	19	13	13	111.0	76.0
13	USA	Mike Tennity	Not documented	USA 790	12	12	12	12	16	16	~~24~~	~~24~~	12	12	18	18	20	20	114.0	90.0
14	USA	Joe Hoeksema	Not documented	USA 807	9	9	~~DNC~~	~~35~~	12	12	OCS	35	16	16	12	12	8	8	127.0	92.0
15	USA	Dave Crysdale	Not documented	USA 639	13	13	22	22	20	20	10	10	13	13	14	14	~~23~~	~~23~~	115.0	92.0
16	USA	Hyde Perce	Not documented	USA 776	14	14	15	15	28	28	15	15	17	17	~~DNF~~	~~35~~	4	4	128.0	93.0
17	CAN	Bill Abbott Sr.	Not documented	CAN 200	16	16	14	14	18	18	18	18	~~19~~	~~19~~	13	13	14	14	112.0	93.0
18	USA	Fred Joosten	Not documented	USA 759	11	11	~~DNF~~	~~35~~	14	14	17	17	22	22	16	16	16	16	131.0	96.0
19	USA	Rich Strilky	Not documented	USA 697	~~DNF~~	~~35~~	13	13	15	15	19	19	18	18	17	17	21	21	138.0	103.0
20	ARG	Richard Grunsten	Not documented	ARG 27	~~DNC~~	~~35~~	DNC	35	17	17	13	13	15	15	15	15	11	11	141.0	106.0
21	USA	Andy Kern	Not documented	USA 819	15	15	21	21	24	24	16	16	20	20	~~DNF~~	~~35~~	18	18	149.0	114.0
22	USA	Jörgen Johnsson	Not documented	USA 431	17	17	18	18	~~26~~	~~26~~	21	21	23	23	20	20	17	17	142.0	116.0
23	CAN	Jerry Wendl	Not documented	CAN 129	19	19	16	16	19	19	20	20	~~27~~	~~27~~	25	25	25	25	151.0	124.0
24	USA	Eric Cornish	Not documented	USA 829	20	20	17	17	23	23	25	25	21	21	~~DNC~~	~~35~~	19	19	160.0	125.0
25	USA	Richard Sullivan	Not documented	USA 812	18	18	20	20	22	22	22	22	24	24	21	21	~~30~~	~~30~~	157.0	127.0
26	USA	Steve Bobo	Not documented	USA 605	21	21	25	25	25	25	23	23	26	26	23	23	~~31~~	~~31~~	174.0	143.0
27	USA	Benn. Greenwald	Not documented	USA 791	26	26	~~DNC~~	~~35~~	27	27	27	27	28	28	22	22	22	22	187.0	152.0
28	ISV	John Morgan	Not documented	ISV 1	22	22	24	24	29	29	28	28	~~30~~	~~30~~	24	24	29	29	186.0	156.0
29	USA	John Kennedy	Not documented	USA 720	~~RET~~	~~35~~	19	19	21	21	26	26	32	32	DNF	35	26	26	194.0	159.0
30	USA	Tim O'Donnell	Not documented	USA 755	23	23	~~DNC~~	~~35~~	30	30	29	29	25	25	DNF	35	24	24	201.0	166.0
31	USA	David Slaght	Not documented	USA 628	25	25	~~DNC~~	~~35~~	DNF	35	DNC	35	29	29	26	26	27	27	212.0	177.0
32	USA	Scott Evans	Not documented	USA 737	27	27	26	26	31	31	30	30	31	31	~~DNC~~	~~35~~	32	32	212.0	177.0
33	USA	Niel Hernekerk	Not documented	USA 731	24	24	23	23	~~DNC~~	~~35~~	DNC	35	DNC	35	DNC	35	DNC	35	222.0	187.0
34	USA	Jack Lane	Not documented	USA 758	~~DNC~~	~~35~~	DNC	35	DNC	35	DNC	35	DNC	35	DNF	35	28	28	238.0	203.0

Legend: DNC – Did not come to the starting area; DNF – Did not finish; DSQ – Disqualified; OCS – On the course side of the starting line; PMS – Premature start; RET – Retired;
Discard is crossed out and does not count for the overall result.
Gender: – male; – female;

- 1997 Progress

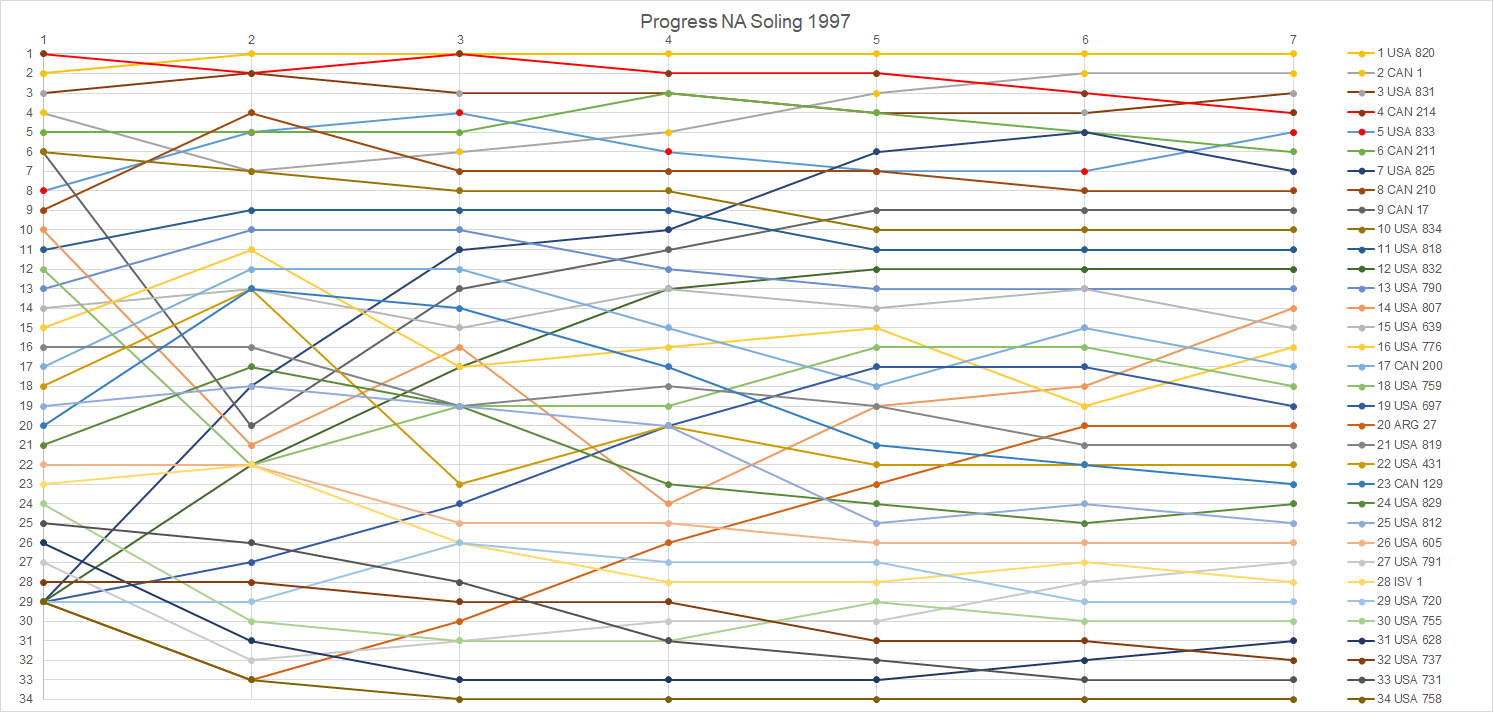

== 1998 Final results ==
1998
Event title
- Edition: 30,
- Host: Rochester Yacht Club

Event details
- Venue: Lake Ontario
- Dates: 10 - 13 Jun
- Yachts: 21
- Opening ceremony: 18 Sep

Competitors
- Competitors: 63
- Competing nations: 3

Results
- (gold) Gold: United States; Jeff Madrigali; Craig Healy; Hartwell Jordan
- (silver) Silver: Canada; Hans Fogh; Thomas Fogh; Michener
- (bronze) Bronze: United States; Tony Rey; Burnham; Dean Brenner

Rank	Country	Helmsman	Crew	Sail No.	Race 1		Race 2		Race 3		Race 4		Race 5		Race 6		Race 7		Total	Total – discard
Rank	Country	Helmsman	Crew	Sail No.	Pos.	Pts.	Pos.	Pts.	Pos.	Pts.	Pos.	Pts.	Pos.	Pts.	Pos.	Pts.	Pos.	Pts.	Total	Total – discard
1st place, gold medalist(s)	USA	Jeff Madrigali	Craig Healy; Hartwell Jordan	USA 823	2	2	1	1	4	4	5	5	~~9~~	~~9~~	3	3	1	1	25	16
2nd place, silver medalist(s)	CAN	Hans Fogh	Thomas Fogh; Michener	CAN 214	~~5~~	~~5~~	4	4	1	1	1	1	3	3	5	5	4	4	23	18
3rd place, bronze medalist(s)	USA	Tony Rey	Burnham; Dean Brenner	USA 831	3	3	2	2	5	5	4	4	2	2	2	2	~~6~~	~~6~~	24	18
4	CAN	Bill Abbott Jr.	Joanne Abbott; Brad Boston	CAN 1	1	1	5	5	6	6	2	2	1	1	~~13~~	~~13~~	11	11	39	26
5	USA	Dave Curtis	Iverson; Frank Hart	USA 830	8	8	7	7	2	2	7	7	~~10~~	~~10~~	1	1	7	7	42	32
6	USA	Kent Heitzinger	Wally Corwin; Culver	USA 825	4	4	11	11	7	7	6	6	5	5	~~15~~	~~15~~	5	5	53	38
7	BRA	Alan Adler	Marcelo Ferreira; Daniel Adler	BRA 68	~~13~~	~~13~~	6	6	8	8	10	10	7	7	7	7	3	3	54	41
8	USA	Horton	Buttner; Herlihy	USA 835	7	7	~~RET~~	~~22~~	9	9	11	11	8	8	6	6	8	8	71	49
9	CAN	John Finch	Nyhof; Scott	CAN 211	~~16~~	~~16~~	13	13	11	11	3	3	12	12	4	4	10	10	69	53
10	USA	Barboza	Jones; Davis	USA 820	12	12	3	3	12	12	~~13~~	~~13~~	4	4	10	10	12	12	66	53
11	USA	Don Cohan	Olson; Stevens	USA 833	10	10	12	12	13	13	8	8	~~20~~	~~20~~	9	9	2	2	74	54
12	CAN	Wendt	Williamson; Farrell	CAN 221	9	9	10	10	15	15	~~20~~	~~20~~	14	14	11	11	9	9	88	68
13	USA	Mike Tennity	Bill Santos; Kingston	USA 790	11	11	~~19~~	~~19~~	17	17	16	16	6	6	8	8	15	15	92	73
14	USA	Jim Medley	Hulbert; White	USA 840	14	14	8	8	3	3	12	12	19	19	~~20~~	~~20~~	18	18	94	74
15	USA	Fischer	Bryant; Landry	USA 739	6	6	18	18	~~DSQ~~	~~22~~	17	17	11	11	12	12	13	13	99	77
16	USA	Brown	Hale; Whistler	USA 828	~~19~~	~~19~~	9	9	10	10	19	19	13	13	16	16	17	17	103	84
17	USA	Gochberg	Enos; Smith	USA 839	15	15	16	16	14	14	~~18~~	~~18~~	16	16	14	14	14	14	107	89
18	USA	Charlie Kamps	Joe Hoeksema; Bailey	USA 832	17	17	17	17	16	16	9	9	~~21~~	~~21~~	17	17	16	16	113	92
19	USA	Sullivan	Jesner; Keppel	USA 812	18	18	14	14	19	19	14	14	15	15	~~21~~	~~21~~	21	21	122	101
20	USA	McTavish	Mcrae; Kiemarow	USA 808	~~20~~	~~20~~	15	15	18	18	15	15	17	17	18	18	20	20	123	103
21	USA	Kinney	Abell; Litchfield	USA 601	~~DNC~~	~~22~~	DNC	22	DNC	22	21	21	18	18	19	19	19	19	143	121

Legend: DNC – Did not come to the starting area; DSQ – Disqualified; RET – Retired;
Discard is crossed out and does not count for the overall result.
Gender: – male; – female;

- 1998 Progress

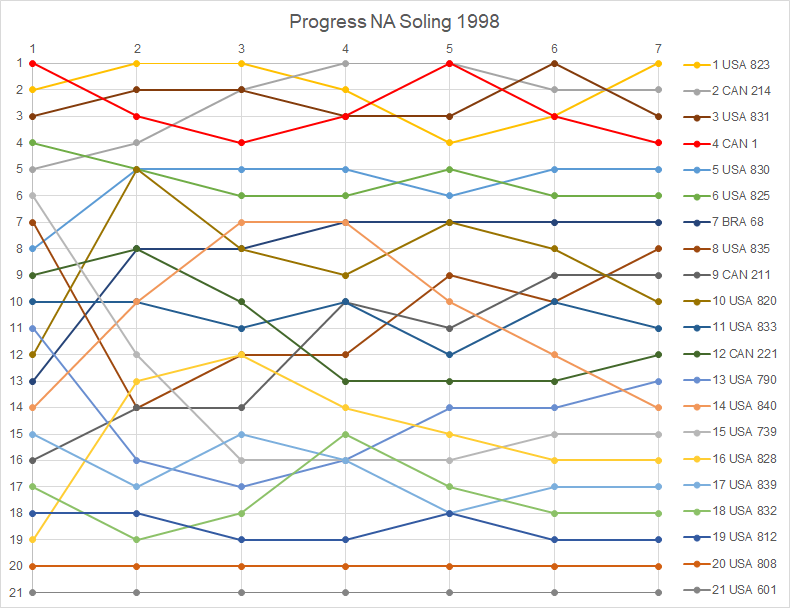

== 1999 Final results ==
1999
Event title
- Edition: 31,
- Host: Etobicoke Yacht Club

Event details
- Venue: Lake Ontario
- Dates: 23 – 26 Sep
- Yachts: 29
- Opening ceremony: 23 Sep

Competitors
- Competitors: 87
- Competing nations: 4

Results
- (gold) Gold: United States; Dave Curtis; Frank Hart; Dean Brenner
- (silver) Silver: Canada; Hans Fogh; Crew not documented
- (bronze) Bronze: Japan; Kobin Kuramichi; Crew not documented

Rank	Country	Helmsman	Crew	Sail No.	Race 1		Race 2		Race 3		Race 4		Race 5		Race 6		Race 7		Total	Total – discard
Rank	Country	Helmsman	Crew	Sail No.	Pos.	Pts.	Pos.	Pts.	Pos.	Pts.	Pos.	Pts.	Pos.	Pts.	Pos.	Pts.	Pos.	Pts.	Total	Total – discard
1st place, gold medalist(s)	USA	Dave Curtis	Frank Hart; Dean Brenner	USA 820	1	1	2	2	2	2	1	1	3	3	1	1	~~DNS~~	~~30~~	40	10
2nd place, silver medalist(s)	CAN	Hans Fogh	Not documented	CAN 224	2	2	1	1	~~26~~	~~26~~	4	4	4	4	3	3	1	1	41	15
3rd place, bronze medalist(s)	JPN	Kobin Kuramichi	Not documented	JPN 36	3	3	~~25~~	~~25~~	3	3	2	2	2	2	4	4	2	2	41	16
4	CAN	Bill Abbott Jr.	Not documented	CAN 1	5	5	~~26~~	~~26~~	1	1	6	6	1	1	2	2	3	3	44	18
5	USA	Andy Horton	Not documented	USA 835	4	4	4	4	~~27~~	~~27~~	3	3	7	7	8	8	5	5	58	31
6	USA	John Gochberg	Not documented	USA 839	6	6	3	3	6	6	7	7	6	6	~~28~~	~~28~~	12	12	68	40
7	USA	Tom Brown	Not documented	USA 828	~~27~~	~~27~~	9	9	4	4	10	10	5	5	5	5	8	8	68	41
8	USA	Kent Heitzinger	Not documented	USA 825	8	8	~~27~~	~~27~~	13	13	5	5	12	12	12	12	4	4	81	54
9	USA	Jeff Gladchun	Not documented	USA 1	7	7	5	5	8	8	14	14	~~28~~	~~28~~	11	11	10	10	83	55
10	CAN	Jerry Wendt	Not documented	CAN 221	12	12	8	8	7	7	16	16	11	11	~~29~~	~~29~~	6	6	89	60
11	CAN	Chris Ritchie	Not documented	CAN 17	17	17	11	11	14	14	8	8	10	10	7	7	~~29~~	~~29~~	96	67
12	USA	Jef Medley	Not documented	USA 840	9	9	13	13	~~28~~	~~28~~	15	15	14	14	6	6	11	11	96	68
13	CAN	Warner Monteiro	Not documented	CAN 200	15	15	14	14	10	10	11	11	~~29~~	~~29~~	9	9	9	9	97	68
14	USA	John Ingalls	Not documented	USA 829	13	13	10	10	~~29~~	~~29~~	9	9	18	18	15	15	7	7	101	72
15	USA	Charlie Kamps	Not documented	USA 832	14	14	~~28~~	~~28~~	12	12	12	12	8	8	13	13	13	13	100	72
16	USA	Dave Crysdale	Not documented	USA 624	11	11	12	12	9	9	~~28~~	~~28~~	16	16	16	16	14	14	106	78
17	ISV	John Morgan	Not documented	ISV 120	20	20	16	16	16	16	~~29~~	~~29~~	9	9	10	10	20	20	120	91
18	CAN	George MacKimmie	Not documented	CAN 203	18	18	~~29~~	~~29~~	15	15	19	19	21	21	18	18	15	15	135	106
19	CAN	Janek Lucki	Not documented	CAN 137	~~28~~	~~28~~	18	18	21	21	18	18	20	20	17	17	16	16	138	110
20	CAN	David Wolf	Not documented	CAN 201	~~29~~	~~29~~	17	17	18	18	17	17	22	22	22	22	17	17	142	113

Legend: DNC – Did not come to the starting area; DSQ – Disqualified; RET – Retired;
Discard is crossed out and does not count for the overall result.
Gender: – male; – female;

- 1999 Progress

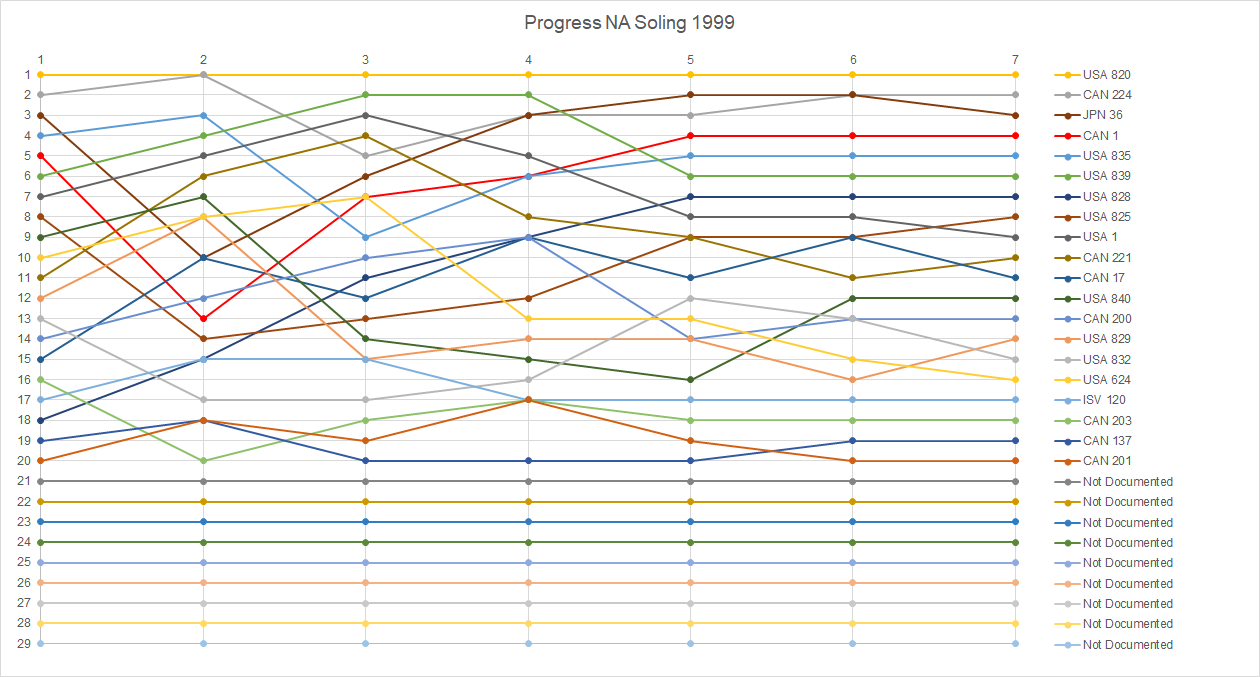

== Further results ==
For further results see:

- Soling North American Championship results (1969–79)
- Soling North American Championship results (1980–89)
- Soling North American Championship results (1990–99)
- Soling North American Championship results (2000–09)
- Soling North American Championship results (2010–19)
- Soling North American Championship results (2020–29)
