= Soling North American Championship results (1980–1989) =

Soling
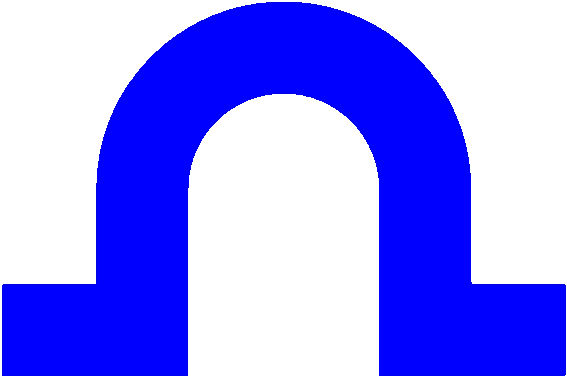

== 1980 Final results ==
No documented detailed results found yet!

1980
Event title
- Edition: 12
- Host: Chicago Yacht Club

Event details
- Venue: Lake Michigan
- Dates: 11–15 August
- Opening ceremony: 11 August

Results
- (gold) Gold: United States; Bill Allen; Dale Hoffman; Brian Porter
- (silver) Silver: Canada; Bill Abbott Jr. Bill Abbott Sr. Larry Abbott
- (bronze) Bronze: Canada; Hans Fogh; Crew not documented

== 1981 Final results ==
1981
Event title
- Edition: 13
- Host: Sarnia Yacht Club

Event details
- Venue: Lake Huron
- Yachts: 40

Competitors
- Competitors: 120
- Competing nations: 4

Results
- (gold) Gold: Brazil; Torben Grael; Daniel Adler; Ronaldo Senfft
- (silver) Silver: Canada; Bill Abbott Jr. Crew not documented
- (bronze) Bronze: Canada; Hans Fogh; Crew not documented

Rank	Country	Helmsman	Crew	Sail No.	Race 1		Race 2		Race 3		Race 4		Race 5		Race 6		Total	Total – discard
Rank	Country	Helmsman	Crew	Sail No.	Pos.	Pts.	Pos.	Pts.	Pos.	Pts.	Pos.	Pts.	Pos.	Pts.	Pos.	Pts.	Total	Total – discard
1st place, gold medalist(s)	BRA	Torben Grael	Daniel Adler; Ronaldo Senfft	BL 42	2	3	~~DSQ~~	~~47~~	1	0	5	10	4	8	1	0	68.0	21.0
2nd place, silver medalist(s)	CAN	Bill Abbott Jr.	Not Documented	KC 1	3	5.7	4	8	4	8	~~6~~	~~11.7~~	2	3	2	3	39.4	27.7
3rd place, bronze medalist(s)	CAN	Hans Fogh	Not Documented	KC 169	1	0	1	0	~~11~~	~~17~~	AV	5.8	5	10	7	13	45.8	28.8
4	USA	Bruce McLeod	Not Documented	US 712	~~8~~	~~14~~	7	13	3	5.7	2	3	3	5.7	6	11.7	53.1	39.1
5	USA	Buddy Melges	Not Documented	US 737	5	10	8	14	2	3	3	5.7	~~24~~	~~30~~	5	10	72.7	42.7
6	CAN	Peter Hall	Not Documented	KC 158	4	8	11	17	8	14	AV	9.8	1	0	~~19~~	~~25~~	73.8	48.8
7	USA	Charlie Kamps	Not Documented	US 697	15	21	2	3	~~18~~	~~24~~	1	0	16	22	12	18	88.0	64.0
8	USA	Dave Perry	Not Documented	US 710	11	16	6	11.7	~~17~~	~~23~~	10	16	10	16	4	8	90.7	67.7
9	NZL	Tom Dodson	Not Documented	KZ 11	~~20~~	~~26~~	3	5.7	9	15	AV	13.7	14	20	8	14	94.4	68.4
10	USA	Jamie McCreary	Not Documented	US 723	6	11.7	~~16~~	~~22~~	15	21	4	8	6	11.7	10	16	90.4	68.4

Legend: DNF – Did not finish; DNS – Did not start; DSQ – Disqualified;
Discard is crossed out and does not count for the overall result.
Gender: – male; – female;

- 1981 Progress

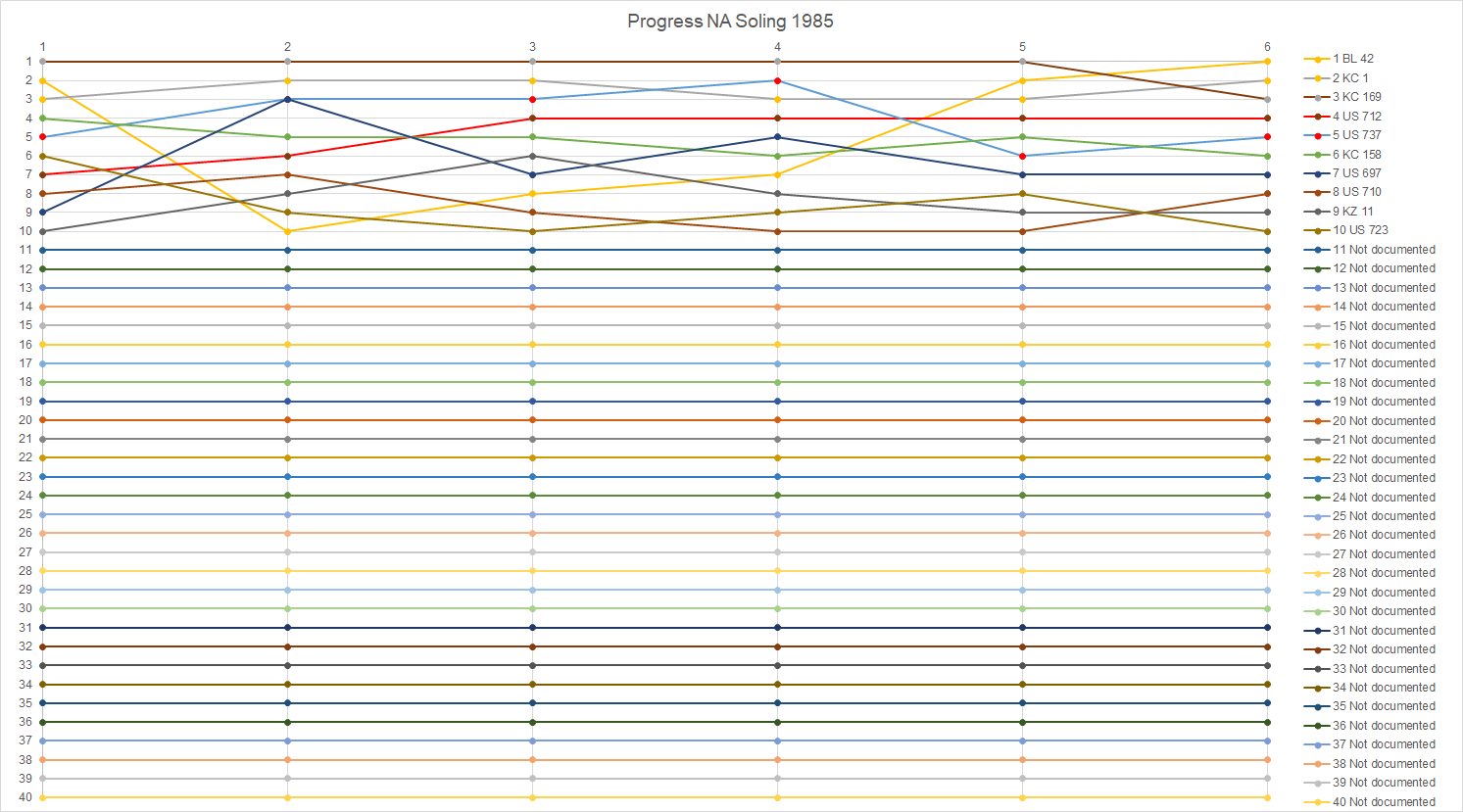

== 1982 Final results ==
1982
Event title
- Edition: 14,

Event details
- Venue: Berkeley Circle on San Francisco Bay
- Dates: 29 Sep - 2 Oct
- Yachts: 29
- Opening ceremony: 29 Sep

Competitors
- Competitors: 87
- Competing nations: 2

Results
- (gold) Gold: United States; Ed Baird; Larry Klein; Tucker Edmundson
- (silver) Silver: United States; Dave Perry; Brad Dellenbaugh; Trevor
- (bronze) Bronze: United States; Robbie Haines; Rod Davis; Ed Trevelyan

Rank	Country	Helmsman	Crew	Sail No.	Race 1		Race 2		Race 3		Race 4		Race 5		Race 6		Total	Total – discard
Rank	Country	Helmsman	Crew	Sail No.	Pos.	Pts.	Pos.	Pts.	Pos.	Pts.	Pos.	Pts.	Pos.	Pts.	Pos.	Pts.	Total	Total – discard
1st place, gold medalist(s)	USA	Ed Baird	Larry Klein; Tucker Edmundson	US 745	1	0	1	0	~~9~~	~~15~~	6	11.7	2	3	5	10	39.7	24.7
2nd place, silver medalist(s)	USA	Dave Perry	Brad Dellenbaugh; Trevor	US 710	2	3	~~11~~	~~17~~	1	0	2	3	3	5.7	8	14	42.7	25.7
3rd place, bronze medalist(s)	USA	Robbie Haines	Rod Davis; Ed Trevelyan	US 747	3	5.7	2	3	3	5.7	8	14	~~DNF~~	~~36~~	2	3	67.4	31.4
4	CAN	Bill Abbott Jr.	Not documented	KC 1	7	13	~~DSQ~~	~~36~~	2	3	11	17	7	13	1	0	82.0	46.0
5	USA	Dave Ullman	Paul Murphy; Robert Kinney	US 749	4	8	5	10	8	14	~~9~~	~~15~~	1	0	9	15	62.0	47.0
6	USA	Jeff Madrigalli	Not documented	US 703	5	10	7	13	13	19	~~18~~	~~24~~	5	10	3	5.7	81.7	57.7
7	USA	S. Easom	Not documented	US 743	6	11.7	6	11.7	~~DSQ~~	~~36~~	7	13	10	16	13	19	107.4	71.4
8	USA	Jim Medley	Not documented	US 701	8	14	9	15	~~16~~	~~22~~	12	18	6	11.7	7	13	93.7	71.7
9	USA	Sandy Miller	Not documented	KC 167	~~DNF~~	~~36~~	4	8	4	8	16	22	9	15	14	20	109.0	73.0
12	USA	Jim Coggan	Not documented	US 695	~~DSQ~~	~~36~~	14	20	DSQ	36	1	0	4	8	6	11.7	111.7	75.7
10	USA	Joe Hoeksema	Not documented	US 744	12	18	10	16	7	13	4	8	16	22	~~DNF~~	~~36~~	113.0	77.0
11	USA	Bob Park	Not documented	US 736	11	17	12	18	~~14~~	~~20~~	10	16	12	18	4	8	97.0	77.0
13	USA	Gaston Ortiz	Not documented	US 699	9	15	3	5.7	~~20~~	~~26~~	17	23	14	20	10	16	105.7	79.7
14	USA	Bruce MacLeod	Not documented	US 712	10	16	8	14	10	16	~~15~~	~~21~~	15	21	11	17	105.0	84.0
15	USA	Karen Olsen	Not documented	US 676	~~21~~	~~27~~	13	19	12	18	3	5.7	18	24	12	18	111.7	84.7
16	USA	Don Cohan	Not documented	US 723	13	19	~~16~~	~~22~~	15	21	5	10	8	14	15	21	107.0	85.0
17	USA	Maurice Rattray	Not documented	US 666	16	22	18	24	5	10	13	19	13	19	~~DNF~~	~~36~~	130.0	94.0
18	USA	G. Borland	Not documented	US 593	18	24	17	23	6	11.7	14	20	~~DNF~~	~~36~~	18	24	138.7	102.7
19	CAN	J. Foster	Not documented	KC 172	14	20	15	21	18	24	~~21~~	~~27~~	20	26	17	23	141.0	114.0
20	USA	J. Edwards	Not documented	US 651	~~23~~	~~29~~	20	26	19	25	19	25	11	17	19	25	147.0	118.0
21	USA	W. Morsfail	Not documented	US 579	19	25	~~25~~	~~31~~	17	23	22	28	19	25	21	27	159.0	128.0
22	USA	J. Price	Not documented	US 677	15	21	22	28	27	33	~~28~~	~~34~~	17	23	20	26	165.0	131.0
23	USA	Sil Smith	Not documented	US 687	22	28	19	25	11	17	25	31	~~DNF~~	~~36~~	26	32	169.0	133.0
24	CAN	R. Jewula	Not documented	KC 116	17	23	21	27	21	27	~~27~~	~~33~~	21	27	23	29	166.0	133.0
25	USA	J. Bitter	Not documented	US 131	20	26	~~26~~	~~32~~	23	29	23	29	23	29	16	22	167.0	135.0
26	USA	Chris Jones	Not documented	US 614	24	30	23	29	26	32	20	26	24	30	~~27~~	~~33~~	180.0	147.0
27	USA	J. Titlow	Not documented	US 176	25	31	~~DNF~~	~~36~~	25	31	26	32	22	28	25	31	189.0	153.0
28	USA	Tom Kenefick	Not documented	US 460	26	32	24	30	24	30	~~DNS~~	~~36~~	DNS	36	24	30	194.0	158.0
29	USA	G. Dean	Not documented	US 713	~~DNS~~	~~36~~	DNS	36	22	28	24	30	DNS	36	22	28	194.0	158.0

Legend: DNF – Did not finish; DNS – Did not start; DSQ – Disqualified;
Discard is crossed out and does not count for the overall result.
Gender: – male; – female;

- 1982 Progress

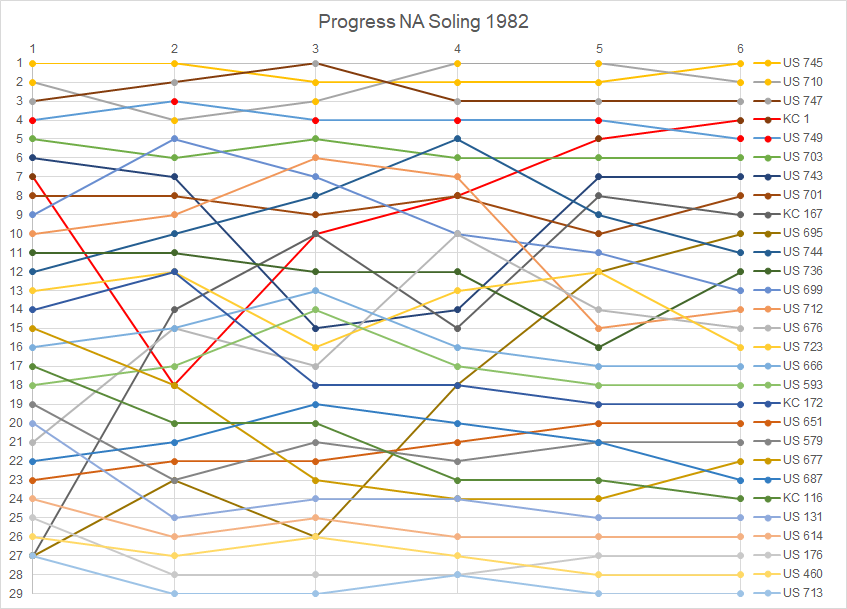

== 1983 Final results ==
1983
Event title
- Edition: 15
- Host: Rochester Yacht Club

Event details
- Venue: Lake Ontario
- Dates: 27–31 August
- Yachts: 36
- Opening ceremony: 27 August

Competitors
- Competitors: 108

Results
- (gold) Gold: United States; Buddy Melges; Harry Melges III; Hans Melges
- (silver) Silver: Canada; Hans Foghs; Not documented
- (bronze) Bronze: Canada; Peter Hall; Andreas Josenhans; Not documented

Only the top 8 boats are documented.

Rank	Country	Helmsman	Crew
1st place, gold medalist(s)	United States	Buddy Melges	Buddy Melges III; Hans Melges
2nd place, silver medalist(s)	Canada	Hans Fogh	Not documented
3rd place, bronze medalist(s)	Canada	Peter Hall	Andreas Josenhans; Not documented
4	United States	John Odenbach	Not documented
5	United States	Ed Baird	Not documented
6	United States	Dave Perry	Not documented
7	United States	Charlie Kamps	Not documented
8	United States	Dave Curtis	Not documented

== 1984 Final results ==
1984
Event title
- Edition: 16
- Host: Seawanhaka Corinthian Yacht Club

Event details
- Venue: Oyster Bay, New York
- Dates: 5 - 7 Oct
- Yachts: 18
- Opening ceremony: 5 Oct

Competitors
- Competitors: 54
- Competing nations: 4

Results
- (gold) Gold: Canada; Hans Fogh; Dennis Toews; Steve Calder
- (silver) Silver: United States; Brian Porter; Crew not documented
- (bronze) Bronze: Canada; Bill Abbott Jr. Crew not documented

Only the top 5 boats are documented.:

Rank	Country	Helmsman	Crew
1st place, gold medalist(s)	Canada	Hans Fogh	Dennis Toews; Steve Calder
2nd place, silver medalist(s)	United States	Brian Porter	Not documented
3rd place, bronze medalist(s)	Canada	Bill Abbott Jr.	Not documented
4	Canada	Richard Johnson	Not documented
5	United States	Sam Merrick	Not documented

== 1985 Final results ==
1985
Event title
- Edition: 17
- Host: Milwaukee Yacht Club

Event details
- Venue: Lake Michigan
- Dates: 18 - 21 Jun
- Yachts: 40
- Opening ceremony: 18 Jun

Competitors
- Competitors: 120
- Competing nations: 2

Results
- (gold) Gold: Canada; Hans Fogh; Steve Calder; Rob Maru
- (silver) Silver: United States; John Kostecki; Bob Billingham; Will Baylis
- (bronze) Bronze: United States; Brian Porter; Crew not documented

Rank	Country	Helmsman	Crew	Sail No.	Race 1		Race 2		Race 3		Race 4		Race 5		Race 6		Race 7		Total	Total – discard
Rank	Country	Helmsman	Crew	Sail No.	Pos.	Pts.	Pos.	Pts.	Pos.	Pts.	Pos.	Pts.	Pos.	Pts.	Pos.	Pts.	Pos.	Pts.	Total	Total – discard
1st place, gold medalist(s)	CAN	Hans Fogh	Steve Calder; Rob Maru	KC 176	2	3	4	8	1	0	1	0	4	8	7	13	~~DNS~~	~~47~~	79.0	32.0
2nd place, silver medalist(s)	USA	John Kostecki	Bob Billingham; Will Baylis	US 706	1	0	2	3	4	8	10	16	7	13	~~13~~	~~19~~	1	0	59.0	40.0
3rd place, bronze medalist(s)	USA	Brian Porter	Not Documented	US 758	4	8	~~24~~	~~30~~	13	19	4	8	3	5.7	1	0	3	5.7	76.4	46.4
4	USA	Kevin Mahaney	Not Documented	US 772	3	5.7	~~11~~	~~17~~	3	5.7	9	15	2	3	3	5.7	7	13	65.1	48.1
5	USA	Buddy Melges	Not Documented	US 757	14	20	5	10	15	21	2	3	~~16~~	~~22~~	2	3	5	10	89.0	67.0
6	USA	Peter Coleman	Not Documented	US 769	10	16	8	14	~~DSQ~~	~~47~~	8	14	1	0	6	11.7	6	11.7	114.4	67.4
7	CAN	Bill Abbott Jr.	Not Documented	KC 1	5	10	9	15	~~12~~	~~18~~	12	18	10	16	4	8	2	3	88.0	70.0
8	USA	Dave Curtis	Not Documented	US 777	9	15	3	5.7	6	11.7	6	11.7	8	14	8	14	~~DNS~~	~~47~~	119.1	72.1
9	CAN	Paul Thompson	Not Documented	KC 158	7	13	6	11.7	2	3	~~DNF~~	~~47~~	13	19	14	20	4	8	121.7	74.7
12	CAN	Jim Beatty	Not Documented	KC 169	6	11.7	7	13	8	14	5	10	9	15	9	15	~~DNS~~	~~47~~	125.7	78.7
10	USA	Bob Penticoff	Tim O'Keefe; Fred Stritt	US 741	8	14	1	0	9	15	~~23~~	~~29~~	21	27	5	10	9	15	110.0	81.0
11	USA	R. Hockert	Not Documented	US 721	11	17	~~22~~	~~28~~	10	16	14	20	5	10	10	16	18	24	131.0	103.0
13	USA	Charlie Kamps	Not Documented	US 697	13	19	~~25~~	~~31~~	5	10	13	19	17	23	18	24	12	18	144.0	113.0
14	USA	Joe Hoeksema	Not Documented	US 744	20	26	13	19	18	24	3	5.7	~~22~~	~~28~~	12	18	15	21	141.7	113.7
15	USA	G. Francisco	Not Documented	US 747	17	23	10	16	7	13	21	27	14	20	11	17	~~DNS~~	~~47~~	163.0	116.0
16	USA	T. McMahon	Not Documented	US 737	12	18	20	26	~~23~~	~~29~~	19	25	6	11.7	16	22	14	20	151.7	122.7
17	USA	T. Slater	Not Documented	US 682	18	24	18	24	22	28	7	13	12	18	~~24~~	~~30~~	16	22	159.0	129.0
18	USA	B. Altman	Not Documented	US 649	15	21	15	21	14	20	~~DSQ~~	~~47~~	19	25	22	28	8	14	176.0	129.0
19	CAN	Bill Abbott Sr.	Not Documented	KC 175	21	27	16	22	17	23	20	26	~~31~~	~~37~~	19	25	13	19	179.0	142.0
20	USA	J. Bevington	Not Documented	US 768	~~29~~	~~35~~	19	25	21	27	16	22	11	17	21	27	21	27	180.0	145.0

Legend: DNF – Did not finish; DNS – Did not start; DSQ – Disqualified;
Discard is crossed out and does not count for the overall result.
Gender: – male; – female;

- 1985 Progress

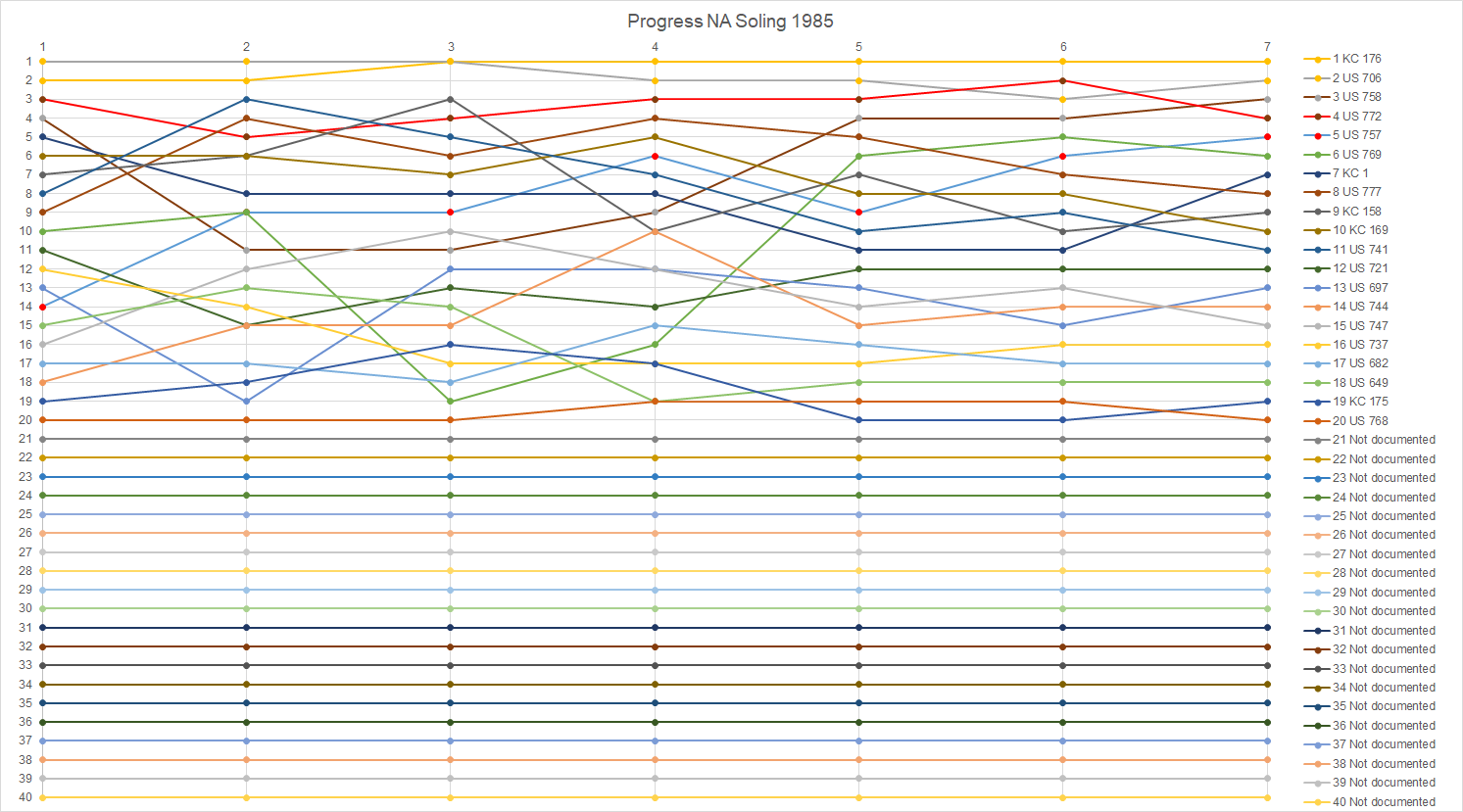

== 1986 Final results ==
1986
Event title
- Edition: 18,
- Host: Portsmouth Olympic Harbour, Kingston, ON

Event details
- Venue: Lake Ontario
- Dates: 28 Jun - 3 - Jul
- Yachts: 18
- Opening ceremony: 28 Jun

Competitors
- Competitors: 56
- Competing nations: 4

Results
- (gold) Gold: Canada; Hans Fogh; Steve Calder; Rob Maru
- (silver) Silver: United States; Dave Curtis; Crew not documented
- (bronze) Bronze: United States; Gerard Coleman; Peter Coleman; Paul Coleman

Rank	Country	Helmsman	Crew	Sail No.	Race 1		Race 2		Race 3		Race 4		Race 5		Total	Total – discard
Rank	Country	Helmsman	Crew	Sail No.	Pos.	Pts.	Pos.	Pts.	Pos.	Pts.	Pos.	Pts.	Pos.	Pts.	Total	Total – discard
1st place, gold medalist(s)	CAN	Hans Fogh	Steve Calder; Rob Maru	KC 176	1	0	1	0	1	0	~~5~~	~~10~~	2	3	13.0	3.0
2nd place, silver medalist(s)	USA	Dave Curtis	Not documented	US 777	5	10	2	3	~~10~~	~~16~~	1	0	1	0	29.0	13.0
3rd place, bronze medalist(s)	USA	Gerard Coleman	Peter Coleman; Paul Coleman	US 769	2	3	8	14	3	5.7	~~14~~	~~20~~	3	5.7	48.4	28.4
4	USA	Brodie Cobb	Not documented	US 779	7	13	4	8	4	8	2	3	~~DNF~~	~~25~~	57.0	32.0
5	CAN	Bill Abbott Jr.	Not documented	KC 1	3	5.7	3	5.7	~~9~~	~~15~~	7	13	6	11.7	51.1	36.1
6	JPN	Kazunori Komatsu	Not documented	J 33	8	14	7	13	2	3	~~15~~	~~21~~	4	8	59.0	38.0
7	USA	Stuart H. Walker	Not documented	US 725	4	8	9	15	~~12~~	~~18~~	3	5.7	7	13	59.7	41.7
8	USA	George Franciscus	Not documented	US 747	~~10~~	~~16~~	5	10	6	11.7	8	14	10	16	67.7	51.7
9	USA	Not documented	Not documented	US 739	6	11.7	6	11.7	~~DNF~~	~~25~~	9	15	8	14	77.4	52.4
12	USA	Kevin Maheney	Not documented	US 772	9	15	~~10~~	~~16~~	7	13	10	16	9	15	75.0	59.0
10	USA	Joe Hoeksema	Not documented	US 744	11	17	14	20	5	10	11	17	~~DNF~~	~~25~~	89.0	64.0
11	USA	Bram Palm	Not documented	US 767	~~13~~	~~19~~	11	17	8	14	12	18	12	18	86.0	67.0
13	USA	Kent Heitzinger	Not documented	US 740	~~16~~	~~22~~	13	19	14	20	6	11.7	11	17	89.7	67.7
14	CAN	Phil Bissel	Not documented	KC 166	12	18	~~15~~	~~21~~	15	21	13	19	5	10	89.0	68.0
15	IND	Surindor Mongia	Not documented	IND 1	14	20	~~18~~	~~24~~	11	17	14	20	13	19	100.0	76.0
16	USA	Not documented	Not documented	US 745	15	21	11	17	13	19	~~17~~	~~23~~	14	20	100.0	77.0
17	USA	Ron Palm	Not documented	US 656	17	23	16	22	16	22	15	21	~~DNF~~	~~25~~	113.0	88.0
18	CAN	Not documented	Not documented	KC 169	18	24	17	23	17	23	18	24	~~DNF~~	~~25~~	119.0	94.0

Legend: DNF – Did not finish;
Discard is crossed out and does not count for the overall result.
Gender: – male; – female;

- 1986 Progress

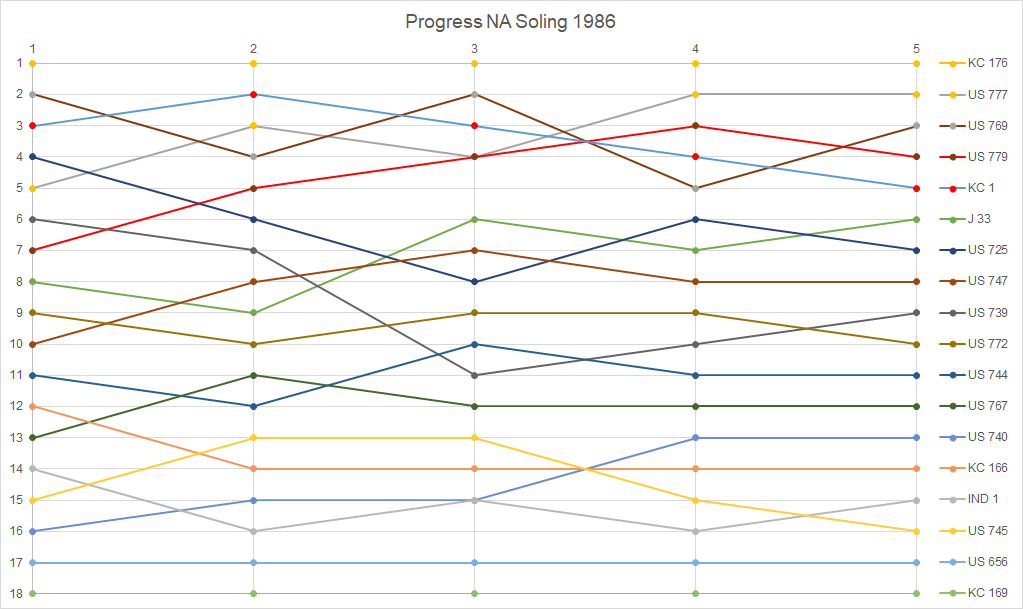

== 1987 Final results ==
1987
Event title
- Edition: 19,

Event details
- Venue: Santa Cruz, Monterey Bay
- Dates: 24 - 28 Aug
- Yachts: 28
- Opening ceremony: 24 Aug

Competitors
- Competitors: 54
- Competing nations: 4

Results
- (gold) Gold: United States; John Kostecki; Bob Billingham; Will Baylis
- (silver) Silver: United States; Ed Baird; Crew not documented
- (bronze) Bronze: United States; Kevin Mahaney; Crew not documented

Rank	Country	Helmsman	Crew	Sail No.	Race 1		Race 2		Race 3		Race 4		Race 5		Race 6		Race 7		Total	Total – discard
Rank	Country	Helmsman	Crew	Sail No.	Pos.	Pts.	Pos.	Pts.	Pos.	Pts.	Pos.	Pts.	Pos.	Pts.	Pos.	Pts.	Pos.	Pts.	Total	Total – discard
1st place, gold medalist(s)	USA	John Kostecki	Bob Billingham; William Baylis	US 736	2	2	1	1	1	1	2	2	1	1	2	2	~~DNS~~	~~29~~	38	9
2nd place, silver medalist(s)	USA	Ed Baird	Not documented	US 793	4	4	3	3	2	2	6	6	4	4	1	1	~~DNS~~	~~29~~	49	20
3rd place, bronze medalist(s)	USA	Kevin Mahaney	Not documented	US 772	1	1	8	8	5	5	~~11~~	~~11~~	3	3	3	3	1	1	32	21
4	USA	C. Healey	Not documented	US 743	3	3	2	2	3	3	~~12~~	~~12~~	11	11	4	4	4	4	39	27
5	AUS	Robert Wilmot	Not documented	KA 168	9	9	10	10	4	4	4	4	~~17~~	~~17~~	5	5	2	2	51	34
6	CAN	Paul Thomson	Not documented	KC 158	6	6	~~PMS~~	~~29~~	10	10	5	5	2	2	7	7	5	5	64	35
7	USA	Don Cohan	Not documented	US 751	~~10~~	~~10~~	4	4	7	7	3	3	10	10	9	9	3	3	46	36
8	USA	Scott Mason	Not documented	US 716	7	7	6	6	8	8	1	1	9	9	~~10~~	~~10~~	7	7	48	38
9	USA	Brodie Cobb	Not documented	US 779	5	5	YMP	15	9	9	8	8	6	6	6	6	~~DNS~~	~~29~~	78	49
10	USA	Gerard Coleman	Peter Coleman; Paul Coleman	US 796	~~DSQ~~	~~29~~	11	11	6	6	10	10	5	5	11	11	8	8	80	51
11	CAN	Bill Abbott Jr.	Not documented	KC 1	8	8	13	13	12	12	~~16~~	~~16~~	7	7	8	8	6	6	70	54
12	USA	P. Shorett	Not documented	US 677	17	17	5	5	DSQ	2	13	13	8	8	12	12	YMP	18	102	73
13	USA	Joe Hoeksema	Not documented	US 744	12	12	12	12	~~16~~	~~16~~	14	14	15	15	13	13	10	10	92	76
14	USA	Jim Medley	Not documented	US 701	13	13	7	7	18	18	~~22~~	~~22~~	12	12	14	14	18	18	104	82
15	CAN	Bill Abbott Sr.	Not documented	KC 175	~~DSQ~~	~~29~~	14	14	14	14	7	7	18	18	17	17	13	13	112	83
16	POR	Antonio Tanger Correia	Not documented	P 9	16	16	18	18	15	15	9	9	16	16	~~22~~	~~22~~	15	15	111	89
17	USA	G. Smith	Not documented	US 687	11	11	15	15	~~24~~	~~24~~	18	18	14	14	18	18	17	17	117	93
18	CAN	Steve Lacey	Not documented	KC 166	18	18	17	17	~~23~~	~~23~~	19	19	16	16	15	15	9	9	117	94
19	USA	A. Berg	Not documented	US 638	15	15	16	16	13	13	~~PMS~~	~~29~~	13	13	24	24	14	14	124	95
20	USA	R. Rattray	Not documented	US 651	20	20	20	20	11	11	~~PMS~~	~~29~~	19	19	20	20	11	11	130	101
21	USA	Maury Rattray	Not documented	US 666	19	19	~~24~~	~~24~~	19	19	15	15	23	23	16	16	16	16	132	108
22	CAN	R. Jewula	Not documented	KC 116	14	14	21	21	17	17	19	19	~~DNF~~	~~29~~	21	21	18	18	139	110
23	USA	J. Walton	Not documented	US 782	21	21	19	19	20	20	20	20	~~25~~	~~25~~	25	25	YMP	20	150	125
24	USA	B. Baldino	Not documented	US 645	~~23~~	~~23~~	23	23	21	21	23	23	YMP	23	19	19	21	21	153	130
25	USA	R. Lewis	Not documented	US 702	22	22	~~25~~	~~25~~	22	22	24	24	21	21	23	23	23	23	160	135
26	USA	G. Dean	Not documented	US 713	24	24	26	26	25	25	17	17	24	24	~~27~~	~~27~~	25	25	168	141
27	USA	J. Kelley	Not documented	US 548	~~DNF~~	~~29~~	22	22	26	26	25	25	22	22	26	26	22	22	172	143
28	USA	E. Keane	Not documented	US 498	25	25	28	28	~~DNS~~	~~29~~	DNS	29	DNS	29	DNS	29	24	24	193	164

Legend: DNF – Did not finish; DNS – Did not start; PMS – Premature start; YMP – Yacht materially prejudiced;
Discard is crossed out and does not count for the overall result.
Gender: – male; – female;

- 1987 Progress

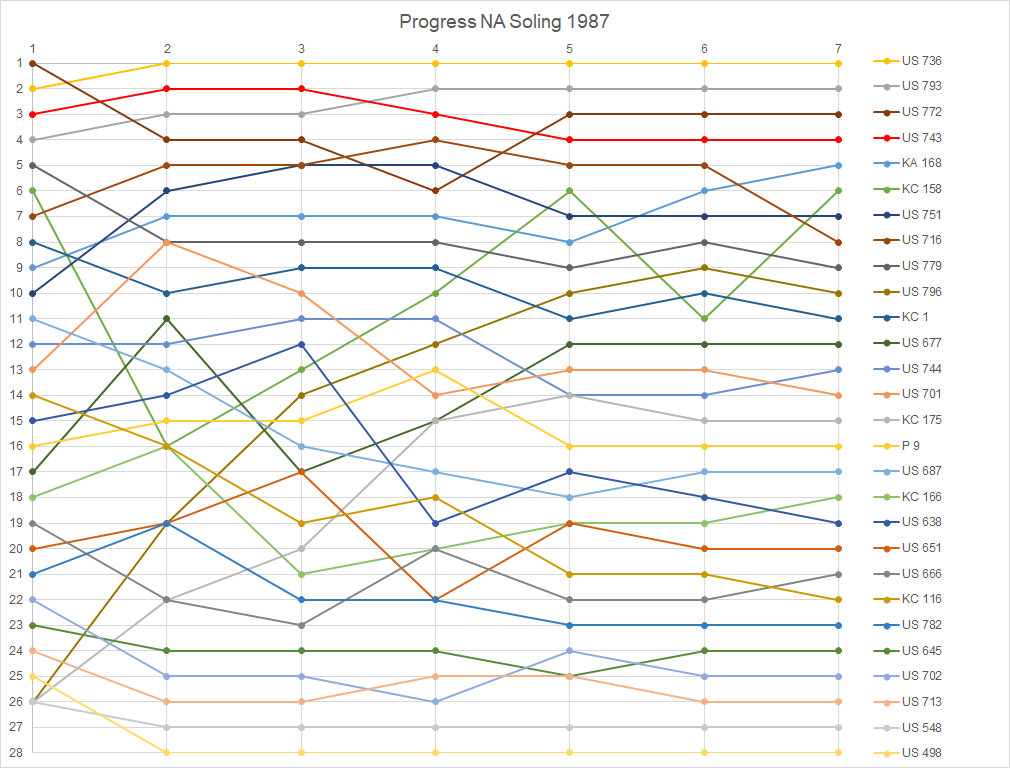

== 1988 Final results ==
1988
Event title
- Edition: 20,
- Host: Wilmette

Event details
- Venue: Lake Michigan
- Dates: 6 - 10 Sep
- Yachts: 31
- Opening ceremony: 6 Sep

Competitors
- Competitors: 63
- Competing nations: 5

Results
- (gold) Gold: United States; Kevin Mahaney; Lance Mahaney; Jim Brady
- (silver) Silver: Canada; Jim Beatty; Crew not documented
- (bronze) Bronze: United States; Stuart H. Walker; Crew not documented

Rank	Country	Helmsman	Crew	Sail No.	Race 1		Race 2		Race 3		Race 4		Race 5		Race 6		Total	Total – discard
Rank	Country	Helmsman	Crew	Sail No.	Pos.	Pts.	Pos.	Pts.	Pos.	Pts.	Pos.	Pts.	Pos.	Pts.	Pos.	Pts.	Total	Total – discard
1st place, gold medalist(s)	USA	Kevin Mahaney	Lance Mahaney; Jim Brady	US 787	1	1	1	1	1	1	1	1	4	4	DNC	3	40	8
2nd place, silver medalist(s)	CAN	Jim Beatty	Not documented	KC 185	6	6	3	3	3	3	5	5	7	7	~~9~~	~~9~~	33	24
3rd place, bronze medalist(s)	USA	Stuart H. Walker	Not documented	US 725	~~10~~	~~10~~	10	10	4	4	2	2	5	5	4	4	35	25
4	POR	Antonio Tanger Correia	Not documented	P 9	7	7	6	6	2	2	~~10~~	~~10~~	8	8	3	3	36	26
5	USA	Jerry Castle	Not documented	US 726	4	4	5	5	10	10	9	9	~~14~~	~~14~~	1	1	43	29
6	URU	Horacio Carabelli	Héber Ansorena; Luis Chiaparro	U	2	2	4	4	~~21~~	~~21~~	7	7	1	1	16	16	51	30
7	ARG	Santiago Lange	Pedro Ferrero; Raúl Lena	A	5	5	2	2	14	14	8	8	~~16~~	~~16~~	2	2	47	31
8	USA	John Oldenbach	Not documented	US 688	~~11~~	~~11~~	11	11	5	5	3	3	2	2	11	11	43	32
9	CAN	Bill Abbott Sr.	Not documented	KC 175	12	12	~~14~~	~~14~~	7	7	6	6	6	6	6	6	51	37
10	USA	Charlie Kamps	Not documented	US 697	8	8	8	8	12	12	~~20~~	~~20~~	3	3	8	8	59	39
11	USA	Fritz Oldenbach	Not documented	US 738	15	15	~~21~~	~~21~~	6	6	4	4	11	11	7	7	64	43
12	USA	Andy Kern	Not documented	US 758	3	3	13	13	8	8	~~18~~	~~18~~	18	18	10	10	70	52
13	USA	Joe Hoeksema	Not documented	US 744	9	9	7	7	17	17	14	14	~~22~~	~~22~~	5	5	74	52
14	USA	Fred Joosten	Not documented	US 759	~~17~~	~~17~~	9	9	11	11	13	13	9	9	15	15	74	57
15	USA	Bob Foley	Not documented	US 575	13	13	15	15	9	9	~~29~~	~~29~~	10	10	12	12	88	59
16	USA	Tom Slater	Not documented	US 682	~~18~~	~~18~~	17	17	15	15	17	17	12	12	18	18	97	79
17	CAN	Bill Adams	Not documented	KC 158	16	16	12	12	~~26~~	~~26~~	15	15	17	17	20	20	106	80
18	USA	Bruce Cameron	Not documented	US 761	14	14	20	20	~~24~~	~~24~~	12	12	20	20	17	17	107	83
19	USA	Kent Heitzinger	Not documented	US 785	23	23	DNC	32	~~27~~	~~27~~	16	16	15	15	14	14	127	95
20	USA	Harry Slaght	Not documented	US 628	24	24	25	25	~~30~~	~~30~~	11	11	23	23	13	13	126	96
21	USA	Randy Draftz	Not documented	US 718	21	21	16	16	16	16	21	21	~~24~~	~~24~~	22	22	120	96
22	USA	Mike Tennity	Not documented	US 790	19	19	19	19	23	23	~~27~~	~~27~~	13	13	DNF	32	133	101
23	USA	Don Chrysdale	Not documented	US 763	~~27~~	~~27~~	23	23	20	20	26	26	19	19	21	21	136	109
24	USA	Jack Lane	Not documented	US 646	22	22	18	18	13	13	DSQ	32	26	26	~~DNF~~	~~32~~	143	111
25	USA	John Kennedy	Not documented	US 258	20	20	22	22	22	22	25	25	~~27~~	~~27~~	24	24	140	113
26	USA	John Donoghue	Not documented	US 569	25	25	24	24	18	18	24	24	~~28~~	~~28~~	23	23	142	114
27	USA	Tom Murphy	Not documented	US 755	~~26~~	~~26~~	26	26	31	31	19	19	25	25	19	19	146	115
28	USA	Craig Warner	Not documented	US 740	29	29	27	27	19	19	23	23	21	21	~~DNF~~	~~32~~	151	119
29	USA	Ed Wavak	Not documented	US 731	28	28	28	28	25	25	22	22	~~29~~	~~29~~	27	27	159	130
30	CAN	Mark Afheldt	Not documented	KC 181	30	30	29	29	28	28	28	28	~~31~~	~~31~~	25	25	171	140
31	USA	Brain Higgens	Not documented	US 689	~~31~~	~~31~~	30	30	29	29	30	30	30	30	26	26	176	145

Legend: DNC – Did not come to the starting area; DNF – Did not finish; DNS – Did not start; PMS – Premature start; YMP – Yacht materially prejudiced;
Discard is crossed out and does not count for the overall result.
Gender: – male; – female;

- 1988 Progress

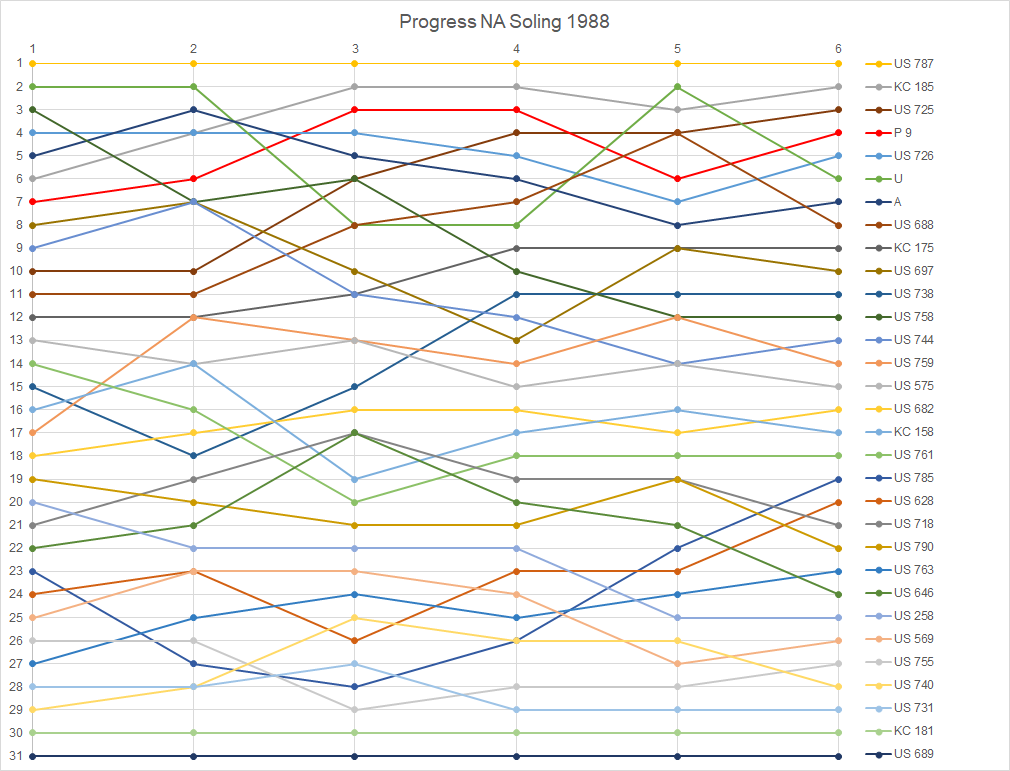

== 1989 Final results ==
1989
Event title
- Edition: 21,
- Host: Severn Sailing Association

Event details
- Venue: Chesapeake Bay
- Dates: 25 - 29 Sep
- Yachts: 19
- Opening ceremony: 25 Sep

Competitors
- Competitors: 57
- Competing nations: 2

Results
- (gold) Gold: United States; Kevin Mahaney; Lance Mahaney; Jim Brady
- (silver) Silver: Canada; Jim Beatty; Crew not documented
- (bronze) Bronze: United States; Stuart H. Walker; Crew not documented

Rank	Country	Helmsman	Crew	Sail No.	Race 1		Race 2		Race 3		Race 4		Race 5		Race 6		Race 7		Total	Total – discard
Rank	Country	Helmsman	Crew	Sail No.	Pos.	Pts.	Pos.	Pts.	Pos.	Pts.	Pos.	Pts.	Pos.	Pts.	Pos.	Pts.	Pos.	Pts.	Total	Total – discard
1st place, gold medalist(s)	USA	Kevin Mahaney	Jim Brady; Doug Kern	US 787	2	2	1	1	1	1	~~8~~	~~8~~	2	2	2	2	1	1	17	9
2nd place, silver medalist(s)	USA	Dave Curtis	Not documented	US 786	~~5~~	~~5~~	2	2	2	2	1	1	1	1	3	3	4	4	18	13
3rd place, bronze medalist(s)	CAN	Bill Abbott Jr.	Not documented	KC 1	6	6	3	3	3	3	3	3	~~8~~	~~8~~	1	1	2	2	26	18
4	USA	Sam Merrick	Not documented	US 788	3	3	4	4	6	6	6	6	5	5	5	5	~~12~~	~~12~~	41	29
5	USA	Don Cohan	Not documented	US 801	7	7	7	7	4	4	7	7	~~13~~	~~13~~	4	4	6	6	48	35
6	USA	Doug McLean	Not documented	US 739	8	8	6	6	5	5	5	5	3	3	10	10	~~11~~	~~11~~	48	37
7	USA	Stuart H. Walker	Not documented	US 725	1	1	9	9	~~DNF~~	~~20~~	10	10	9	9	7	7	5	5	61	41
8	USA	Charlie Kamps	Not documented	US 697	~~11~~	~~11~~	11	11	7	7	9	9	4	4	9	9	3	3	54	43
9	USA	Joe Hoeksema	Not documented	US 744	10	10	5	5	13	13	2	2	~~15~~	~~15~~	11	11	8	8	64	49
10	USA	Paul Murphy	Not documented	US 778	4	4	10	10	11	11	13	13	6	6	~~15~~	~~15~~	10	10	69	54
11	CAN	Tim Otton	Not documented	KC 146	12	12	8	8	10	10	4	4	10	10	12	12	~~14~~	~~14~~	70	56
12	CAN	Erik Koppernaes	Not documented	KC 158	~~DSQ~~	~~20~~	15	15	8	8	DSQ	20	7	7	6	6	7	7	83	63
13	USA	Thom Davies	Not documented	US 798	~~17~~	~~17~~	14	14	9	9	14	14	11	11	8	8	13	13	86	69
14	USA	Bruce Breiding	Not documented	US 780	15	15	12	12	15	15	15	15	~~17~~	~~17~~	13	13	9	9	96	79
15	USA	Bruce Cameron	Not documented	US 761	13	13	17	17	12	12	12	12	14	14	17	17	~~DNC~~	~~20~~	105	85
16	USA	Ed Buerger	Not documented	US 792	9	9	18	18	14	14	11	11	18	18	18	18	~~DNC~~	~~20~~	108	88
17	USA	Jerry Castle	Not documented	US 726	14	14	13	13	17	17	16	16	12	12	16	16	~~DNC~~	~~20~~	108	88
18	USA	John Harper	Not documented	US 732	16	16	16	16	16	16	17	17	16	16	14	14	~~DNC~~	~~20~~	115	95
19	USA	Fredrick Seeley	Not documented	US 729	18	18	19	19	18	18	18	18	19	19	DNF	20	~~DNC~~	~~20~~	132	112

Legend: DNC – Did not come to the starting area; DNF – Did not finish; DSQ – Disqualified;
Discard is crossed out and does not count for the overall result.
Gender: – male; – female;

- 1989 Progress

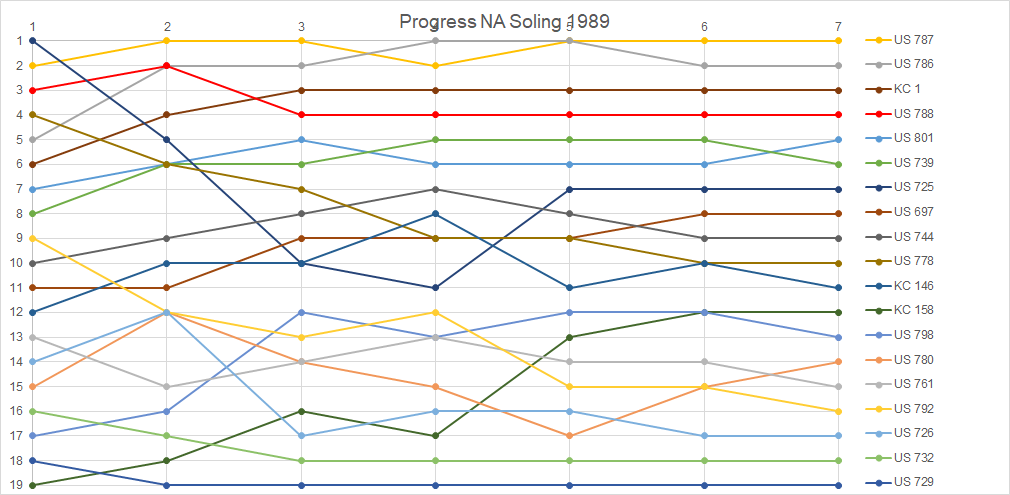

== Further results ==
For further results see:

- Soling North American Championship results (1969–79)
- Soling North American Championship results (1980–89)
- Soling North American Championship results (1990–99)
- Soling North American Championship results (2000–09)
- Soling North American Championship results (2010–19)
- Soling North American Championship results (2020–29)
