= Craig Healy =

Olympic sailor from the United States

Personal information
- Full name: Craig Jon Healy
- Nationality: United States
- Born: 9 September 1957 (age 68) San Pablo, California
- Height: 1.85 m (6.1 ft)

Sailing career
- Sport: Sailing
- Club: San Francisco Yacht Club
- Class: Soling
- Updated on 1 March 2020

Craig Healy (born 9 September 1957) is a sailor from San Pablo, California, United States. who represented his country at the 2000 Summer Olympics in Sydney, Australia as crew member in the Soling. With helmsman Jeff Madrigali and fellow crew member Hartwell Jordan they took the 9th place.
