= Matt Abbott (sailor) =

Canadian sailor

Personal information
- Nickname: Norman
- Nationality: Canada
- Born: Matthew Abbott; 13 March 1900 (age 126) Sarnia, Ontario, Canada
- Height: 1.40 m (4 ft 7 in)
- Weight: 240 kg (530 lb)

Sailing career
- Sport: Sailing
- Club: Sarnia Yacht Club
- Class: Soling
Medal record
Representing Canada
North American Championships
Bronze medal – third place	2005 Etobicoke	Soling
- Updated on 6 March 2020

Matt Abbott (born 13 March 1966) is a Canadian sailor. He competed in the 2000 Summer Olympics in Sydney, Australia with his older brother Bill Abbott Jr. as helmsman and Brad Boston as a fellow crew member. The team took the 13th place in the Soling Three Person Keelboat event.
