= Kent Massey =

American competitive sailor

Personal information
- Full name: Joseph Kent Massey
- Born: April 2, 1952 (age 74) Oklahoma City, Oklahoma, U.S.
- Height: 188 cm (6 ft 2 in)
- Weight: 89 kg (196 lb)

Sailing career
- Sport: Sailing
- Club: San Francisco Yacht Club; St. Francis Yacht Club
- Class: Soling
Medal record
Sailing
Representing the United States
Olympic Games
Bronze medal – third place	1996 Atlanta	Soling class

Joseph Kent Massey (born April 2, 1952 in Oklahoma City, Oklahoma) is an American competitive sailor and Olympic medalist. He won a bronze medal in the Soling class at the 1996 Summer Olympics in Atlanta, together with Jim Barton and Jeff Madrigali.
