= Jim Barton (sailor) =

American sailor (born 1956)

Personal information
- Full name: James Barton
- Born: March 3, 1956 (age 70) Lincoln County, Tennessee, U.S.
- Height: 188 cm (6 ft 2 in)
- Weight: 84 kg (185 lb)

Sailing career
- Sport: Sailing
- Club: San Francisco Yacht Club; St. Francis Yacht Club
- Class: Soling
Medal record
Sailing
Representing the United States
Olympic Games
Bronze medal – third place	1996 Atlanta	Soling class

James Barton (born March 3, 1956, in Lincoln County, Tennessee) is an American competitive sailor and Olympic medalist. He won a bronze medal in the Soling class at the 1996 Summer Olympics in Atlanta, together with Jeff Madrigali and Kent Massey.
