= Dave Curtis =

American sailor

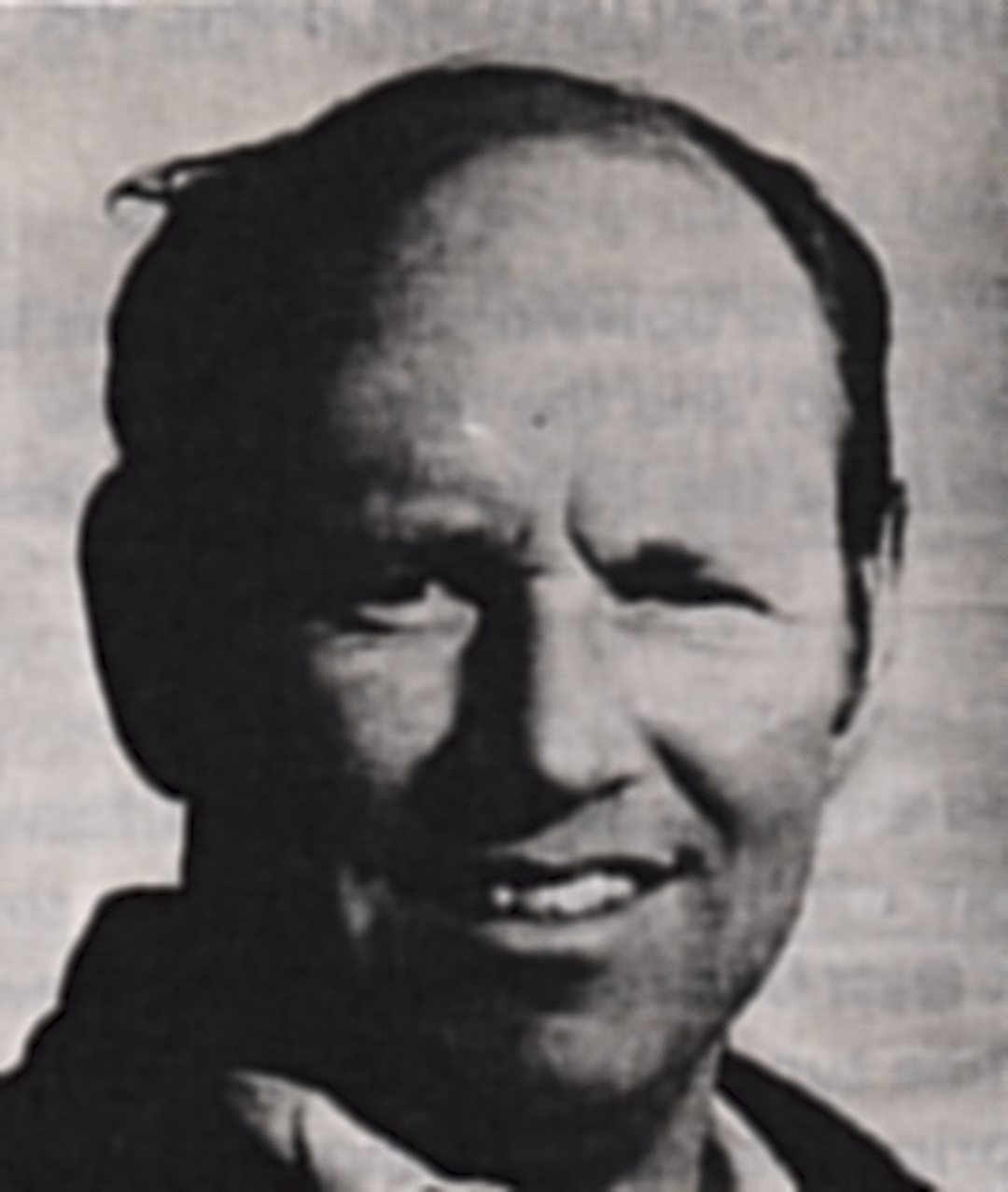

Personal information
- Full name: David Adams Curtis
- Nationality: American
- Born: June 22, 1946 (age 80) Marblehead, Massachusetts

Sailing career
- Sport: Sailing
- College team: Tufts University
- Club: Eastern Yacht Club
- Classes: Jolly boat, Lightning, J/24, Soling, Etchells
Medal record
Sailing
Representing United States
World Championships
| Gold medal – first place | 1976 Newport | Etchells |
| Gold medal – first place | 1978 Balboa | Etchells |
| Gold medal – first place | 1981 Marblehead | Etchells |
| Gold medal – first place | 1982 San Francisco | Etchells |
| Gold medal – first place | 1983 Rye | Etchells |
| Gold medal – first place | 1984 Poole | J/24 |
| Gold medal – first place | 1985 Balboa | Etchells |
| Gold medal – first place | 1985 Sarnia | Soling |
| Gold medal – first place | 1992 Larchmont | Etchells |
| Silver medal – second place | 1983 San Francisco | Soling |
| Silver medal – second place | 1986 La Trinite-sur-Mer | Soling |
| Silver medal – second place | 1988 Melbourne | Soling |
| Silver medal – second place | 2002 Marblehead | Soling |
European Championships
| Gold medal – first place | 1991 La Baule | Soling |
North American Championships
| Gold medal – first place | 1970 Houston | Soling |
| Gold medal – first place | 1972 Oyster Bay | Soling |
| Gold medal – first place | 1990 Tiburon | Soling |
| Gold medal – first place | 1997 Wilmette | Soling |
| Gold medal – first place | 1999 Etobicoke | Soling |
| Silver medal – second place | 1986 Kingston | Soling |
| Silver medal – second place | 1989 Annapolis | Soling |
| Silver medal – second place | 1995 San Francisco | Soling |

David Adams Curtis (born June 22, 1946 in Marblehead, Massachusetts) is an American sailor and sail maker.

As a sailor he competed at the highest level in many National and International classes. He won the World Championships in the Etchells severn times and was second six time. However Dave was successful in many other classes he with five North American, four US, one European and one World Championship in the Soling, and one in the J/24 he won the Worlds once and four North American Championships. As sail maker he held franchises for, among others, Horizon Sails, North Sails and Doyle Sails.

Curtis was inducted into the National Sailing Hall of Fame in 2013.
