= Jeff Madrigali =

American sailor

Personal information
- Full name: Geoffrey Madrigali
- Born: May 8, 1956 (age 70) Walnut Creek, California, U.S.
- Height: 180 cm (5 ft 11 in)
- Weight: 88 kg (194 lb)

Sailing career
- Sport: Sailing
- Club: San Francisco Yacht Club
- Class: Soling
Medal record
Sailing
Representing the United States
Olympic Games
Bronze medal – third place	1996 Atlanta	Soling class

Geoffrey "Jeff" Madrigali (born May 8, 1956, in Walnut Creek, California) is an American competitive sailor and Olympic medalist. He won a bronze medal in the Soling class at the 1996 Summer Olympics in Atlanta, together with Jim Barton and Kent Massey.

He sailed on America True at the 2000 Louis Vuitton Cup.
