= Paul Coleman (sailor) =

American competitive sailor

Paul J. Coleman
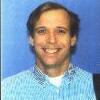
- Paul Coleman

Personal information
- Nationality: American
- Born: Paul John Coleman New York, United States

Sailing career
- Sport: Sailing
- College team: New York Maritime College ** All-American Honorable Mention
- Club: New York Yacht Club
- Class(es): Maxi Class, Soling, Etchells, J/24, 470 (dinghy)
Medal record
Sailing
Representing United States
United States Sailing Championship
Gold medal – first place	1983 Mallory Cup	Etchells class

Paul J. Coleman is an American competitive sailor.

== Early life ==
Coleman grew up in Larchmont, New York, close to Horseshoe Harbor and was from a young age interested in sailing.

He and his twin Paul both studied at New York Maritime College. They competed in the 1976 470 Olympic trials, and then, with their brother Gerard, in the Soling.

== Sailing career ==
Coleman has competed in many world class events such as the J/24, Soling and Etchells classes. With his brother Paul he took a gold in the North American Men's Sailing Championship Mallory Cup in 1983.
