= Brad Boston =

Canadian sailor (born 1974)

Personal information
- Full name: Bradley Boston
- Born: 29 August 1974 (age 52) Sarnia, Ontario, Canada
- Height: 1.83 m (6 ft 0 in)
- Weight: 83 kg (183 lb)

Sport
- Sport: Sailing

Brad Boston (born 29 August 1974) is a Canadian sailor. He competed in the 1996 Summer Olympics with his teammates Bill Abbott Jr. and Joanne Abbott in the Soling.
