= San Francisco Yacht Club =

Yacht club in California

- Burgee
- Short name: SFYC
- Founded: 1869
- Location: Belvedere, California
- Website: www.sfyc.org

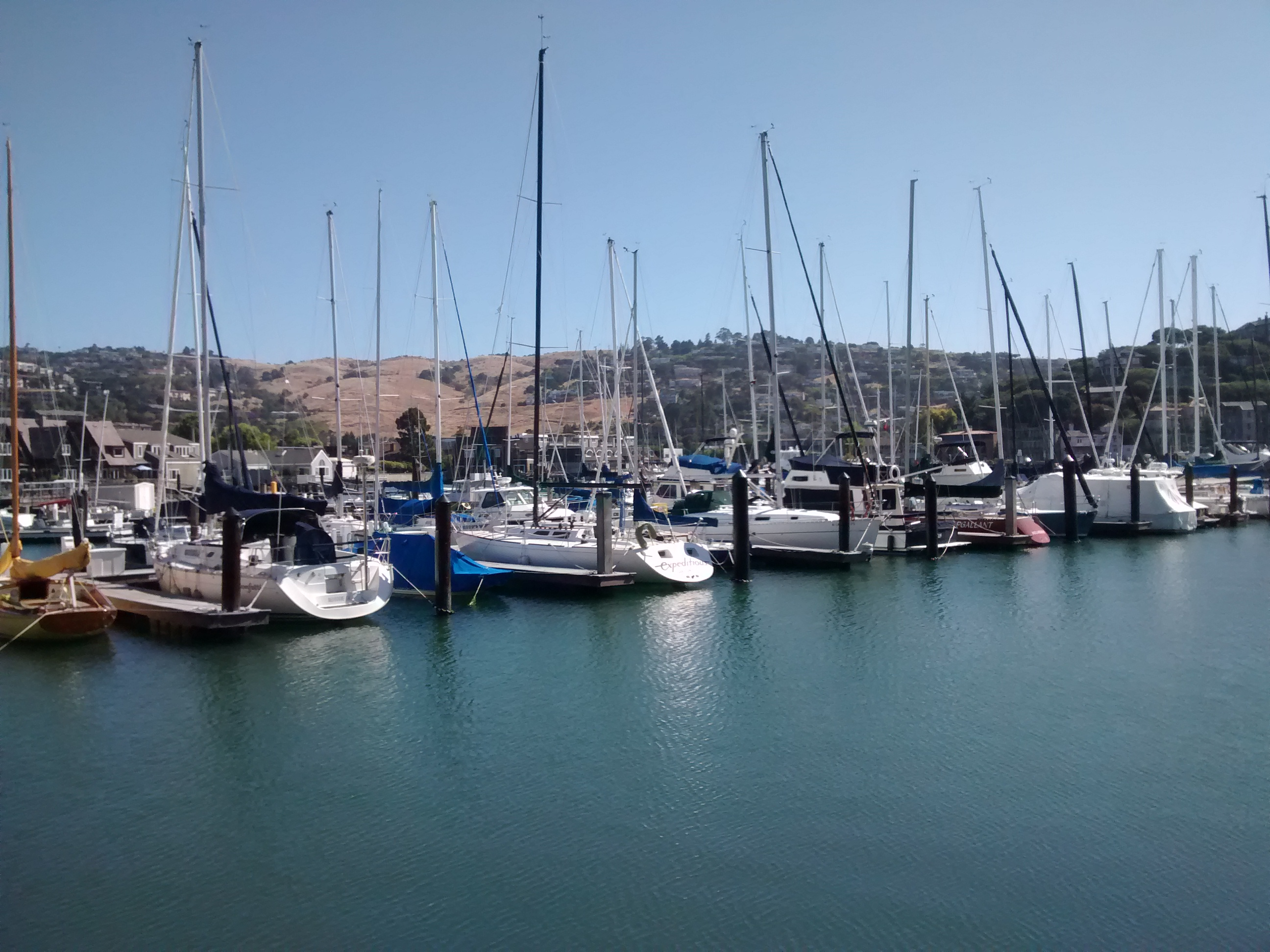
Boats at the San Francisco Yacht Club

The San Francisco Yacht Club is a yacht club located in Belvedere, California, and the oldest on the Pacific Coast. They were formerly located in San Francisco.

== History ==
Founded in 1869, the San Francisco Yacht Club is the oldest club on the Pacific Coast. The original anchorage and clubhouse were located in San Francisco near Mission Rock, but inadequate depth of water and increasing industrial growth in the area resulted in a move to Sausalito. Waterfront property was purchased and a new clubhouse erected, but it was subsequently destroyed by fire in 1897.

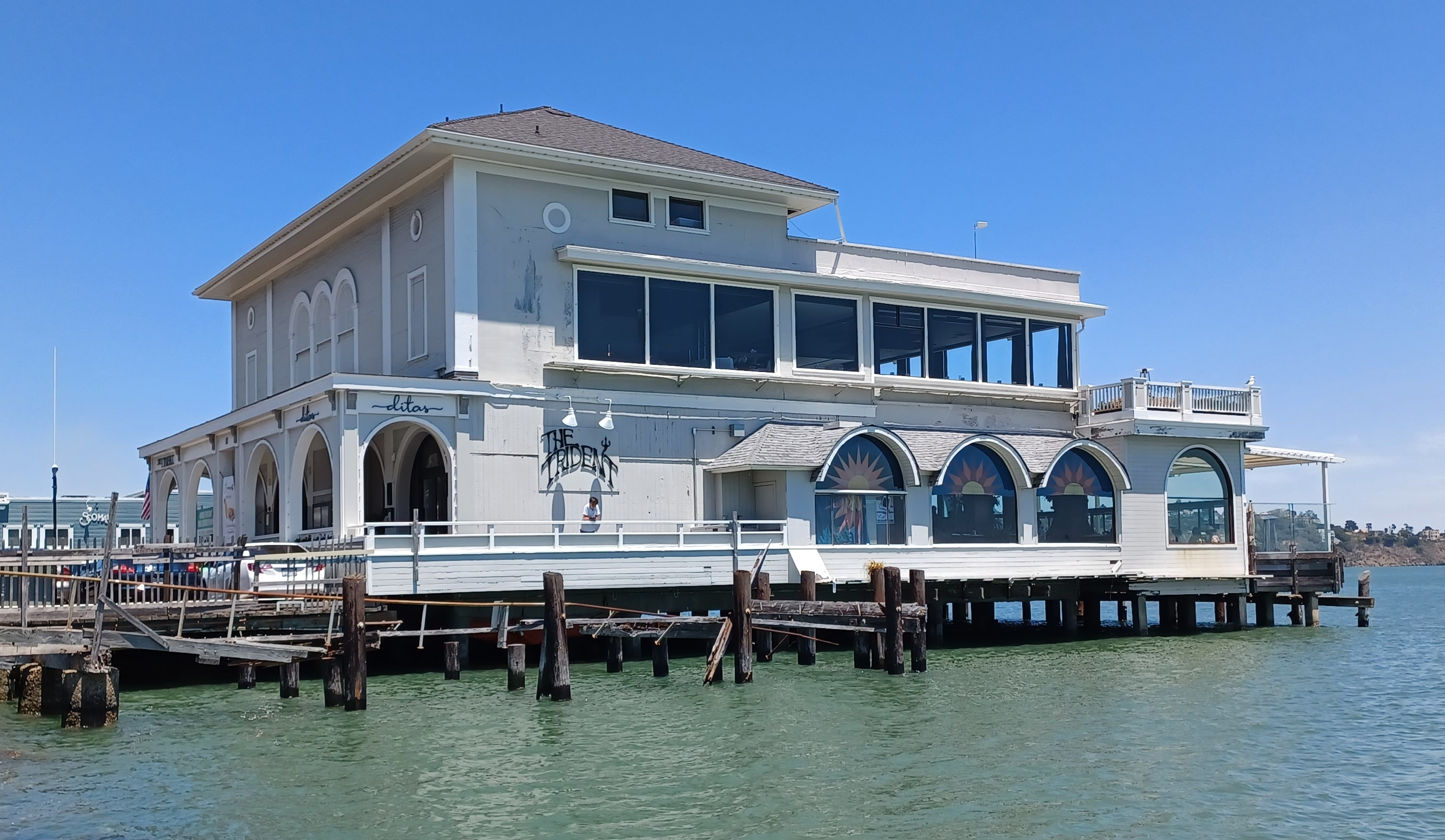
Former location in Sausalito, now a restaurant called The Trident

The rebuilt building is still standing and now houses a restaurant currently called The Trident. Increasing ferry traffic and congestion contributed to a decision to move again in 1926. One group, headed by Commodore Clifford Smith, felt that Belvedere Cove would be an ideal location. Another group felt that the Club should move back to San Francisco and lease land from the city government on the Marina. After considerable discussion the Belvedere site was finally selected. Those who opposed the move resigned and formed the St. Francis Yacht Club. A small clubhouse on the Belvedere site was completed in 1934 and is still part of the present building. Planning for the present 190-berth harbor was begun in 1933 and completed in 1957 when funds were available.

The San Francisco Yacht Club, located in Belvedere Cove, operates as a year-round facility, including the harbor, a dry sail area, a full-service restaurant, and a bar. The Club's exterior and interior were completely remodeled in 2007.

The Club has a very active junior sailing program and all members, whether they own boats or not, are committed to the Corinthian traditions of yachting.

== The Cove House ==
In July 2020, The SFYC built the Cove House, a facility that features both indoor and outdoor spaces in which members can host events, regattas, private parties and more. The facility itself features both indoor and outdoor spaces in which members can host regattas, member events and private parties.
