= Soling North American Championship results (2010–2019) =

Soling
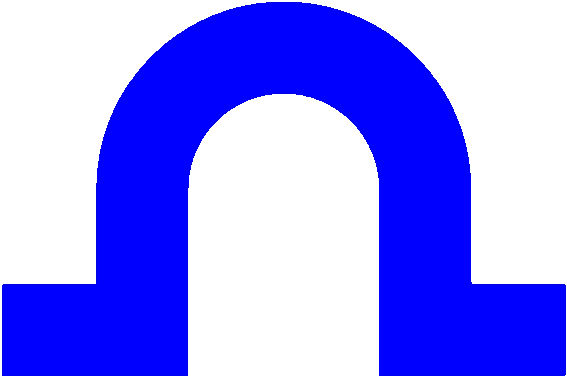

Development
- Name: Soling

== 2010 Final results ==
2010
Event title
- Edition: 42,
- Host: Loyalist Cove Yacht Club

Event details
- Venue: Lake Ontario
- Dates: 2 – 5 Jul
- Yachts: 16
- Opening ceremony: 2 Jul

Competitors
- Competitors: 48
- Competing nations: 2

Results
- (gold) Gold: Canada; Hans Fogh; Roger Cheer; Gord Devries
- (silver) Silver: United States; Stuart H. Walker; Bruce Empey; Doug Loup
- (bronze) Bronze: Canada; Peter Hall; Ross Findlater; Phillip Kerrigan

Rank	Country	Helmsman	Crew	Sail No.	Race 1		Race 2		Race 3		Race 4		Race 5		Race 6		Total	Total – discard
Rank	Country	Helmsman	Crew	Sail No.	Pos.	Pts.	Pos.	Pts.	Pos.	Pts.	Pos.	Pts.	Pos.	Pts.	Pos.	Pts.	Total	Total – discard
1st place, gold medalist(s)	CAN	Hans Fogh	Roger Cheer; Gord Devries	CAN 230	1	1	1	1	1	1	2	2	2	2	~~DNC~~	~~17~~	24	7
2nd place, silver medalist(s)	USA	Stuart H. Walker	Doug Loup; Bruce Empey	USA 839	4	4	2	2	3	3	~~6~~	~~6~~	1	1	1	1	17	11
3rd place, bronze medalist(s)	CAN	Peter Hall	Ross Findlater; Phillip Kerrigan	CAN 225	2	2	~~4~~	~~4~~	2	2	3	3	3	3	4	4	18	14
4	CAN	Ken Davy	Eric Nowina; David Hymers	CAN 210	~~9~~	~~9~~	3	3	4	4	1	1	9	9	6	6	32	23
5	CAN	Manfred Kanter	Steve Donker; Tom Freeman	CAN 226	6	6	7	7	7	7	4	4	~~10~~	~~10~~	3	3	37	27
6	CAN	Kevin Brown	Mark Bird; Jim McGuiness	CAN 211	5	5	6	6	6	6	~~7~~	~~7~~	5	5	7	7	36	29
7	USA	Brian White	Bruce Gugliotta; Brad Dumas	USA 780	11	11	9	9	5	5	5	5	~~13~~	~~13~~	2	2	45	32
8	CAN	Tom Mitchell	Francisco Perez; Konrad Davy	CAN 227	3	3	~~12~~	~~12~~	11	11	10	10	7	7	5	5	48	36
9	USA	John Kennedy	Brendan Kennedy; Lauren Radomski	USA 818	~~14~~	~~14~~	8	8	8	8	8	8	4	4	8	8	50	36
10	USA	Henry Thomas	Boomer Mazanec; Martensson Patrick	USA 799	7	7	~~11~~	~~11~~	9	9	11	11	8	8	9	9	55	44
11	USA	Roland Sherman	Laurie Gugliotta; Mark Stata	USA 835	~~12~~	~~12~~	10	10	12	12	9	9	6	6	11	11	60	48
12	CAN	Steve Bobo	Larry Votary; Jerry Gasiorowski	CAN 198	~~15~~	~~15~~	5	5	10	10	12	12	14	14	12	12	68	53
13	CAN	Peter Lammens	Greg McElrea; Wayne Suttner	CAN 167	10	10	~~16~~	~~16~~	13	13	14	14	11	11	13	13	77	61
14	CAN	Dixon Bernhart	Ben Rottevel; Tobin Humphrys	CAN 2301	8	8	13	13	15	15	~~16~~	~~16~~	12	12	14	14	78	62
15	USA	Paul McGuan	Matt Peters; Mike Garrett	USA 834	13	13	14	14	14	14	13	13	~~15~~	~~15~~	10	10	79	64
16	CAN	Peter Bennett	Sheila Dunkinson; Andre Wloka	CAN 2251	16	16	15	15	~~DNC~~	~~17~~	15	15	16	16	15	15	94	77

Legend: DNC – Did not come to the starting area; DSQ – Disqualified; RET – Retired;
Discard is crossed out and does not count for the overall result.
Gender: – male; – female;

- 2010 Progress

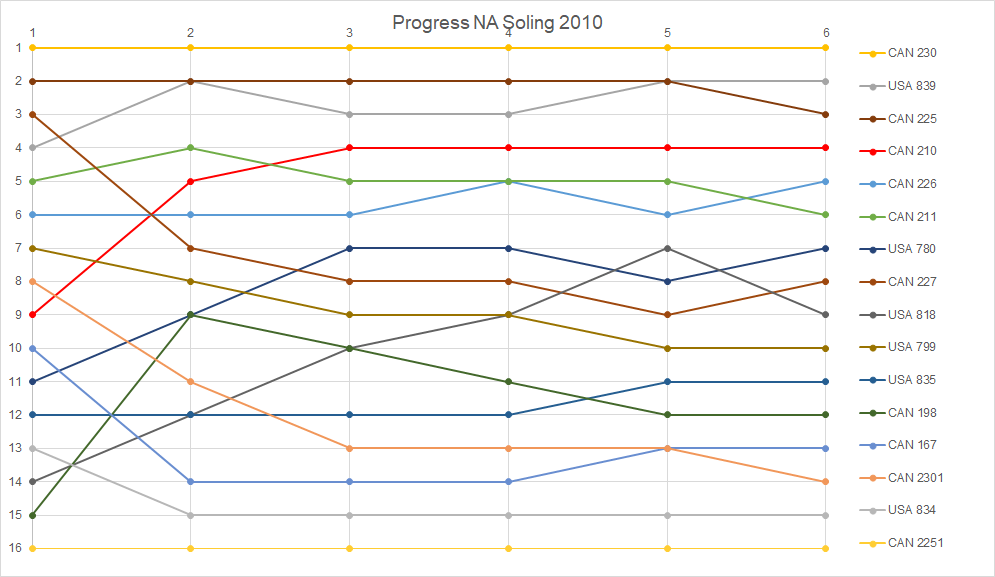

== 2011 Final results ==
2011
Event title
- Edition: 43
- Host: Milwaukee Yacht Club

Event details
- Venue: Lake Michigan
- Dates: 29 Sep - 2 Oct
- Yachts: 18
- Opening ceremony: 29 Sep

Competitors
- Competitors: 54
- Competing nations: 3

Results
- (gold) Gold: Canada; Manfred Kanter; Blair Tully; Tom Freeman
- (silver) Silver: Canada; Peter Hall; Michael Parsons; William Hall
- (bronze) Bronze: United States; Scott Conger; Mark Rodaer; Stephanie Vavra

Rank	Country	Helmsman	Crew	Sail No.	Race 1		Race 2		Race 3		Race 4		Race 5		Total
Rank	Country	Helmsman	Crew	Sail No.	Pos.	Pts.	Pos.	Pts.	Pos.	Pts.	Pos.	Pts.	Pos.	Pts.	Total
1st place, gold medalist(s)	CAN	Manfred Kanter	Blair Tully; Tom Freeman	CAN 226	4	4	1	1	2	2	3	3	4	4	14
2nd place, silver medalist(s)	CAN	Peter Hall	Michael Parsons; Will Hall	CAN 225	2	2	DSQ	17	1	1	1	1	3	3	24
3rd place, bronze medalist(s)	USA	Scott Conger	Mark Rodaer; Stephanie Vavra	USA 718	3	3	4	4	3	3	4	4	12	12	26
4	CAN	Hans Fogh	Gord Devries; John Kerr Jr.	CAN230	1	1	DSQ	17	5	5	2	2	1	1	26
5	USA	Steve Dolan	Duncan Blue; Scott Stroud	USA846	5	5	2	2	6	6	8	8	8	8	29
6	USA	Charlie Kamps	Cooper Anderson; Jon Bailey	USA832	6	6	3	3	4	4	5	5	11	11	29
7	USA	Dave Crysdale	Willie Rozanski; Dave Richards	USA824	7	7	DNF	17	10	10	7	7	2	2	43
8	USA	Steve Bobo	Jeff Spence; Aubrey Granner	USA843	DNS	17	7	7	7	7	6	6	9	9	46
9	USA	Tom Elliott	Griffin Elliott; John Bayldon	USA768	11	11	6	6	9	9	9	9	15	15	50
10	USA	Ross Richards	Lucas Hiller; Amanda Richards	USA816	12	12	DNS	17	8	8	10	10	7	7	54
11	USA	Dave Slaght	Kent Smith; Don Brackey	USA628	17	17	9	9	12	12	11	11	16	16	65
12	USA	David Baum	James Bruss; Brian Lennie	USA639	9	9	5	5	DNF	17	DNS	17	14	14	62
13	USA	Henry Thomas	Andrew Dize; Sam Elcik	USA799	8	8	DNS	17	DNS	17	DNS	17	6	6	65
14	USA	Paul McGuan	Mark Keast; Justin Linnemeier	USA834	15	15	8	8	DNF	17	DNS	17	10	10	67
15	USA	Scott Evans	Not documented Kiara Caldwell	USA790	13	13	10	10	11	11	DNS	17	18	18	69
16	ISV	John Morgan	Jim Medely; Not documented	ISV 1	16	16	DNS	17	DNS	17	DNS	17	5	5	72
17	USA	Bob Nickel	Pete Buerger; Buckley Crist	USA808	14	14	DNS	17	13	13	DNS	17	13	13	74
18	USA	Ashley Henderson	Tod Patton; Daniel Germanotta	USA601	10	10	DNS	17	DNS	17	DNS	17	17	17	78

Legend: DNC – Did not come to the starting area; DSQ – Disqualified; RET – Retired;
Discard is crossed out and does not count for the overall result.
Gender: – male; – female;

- 2011 Progress

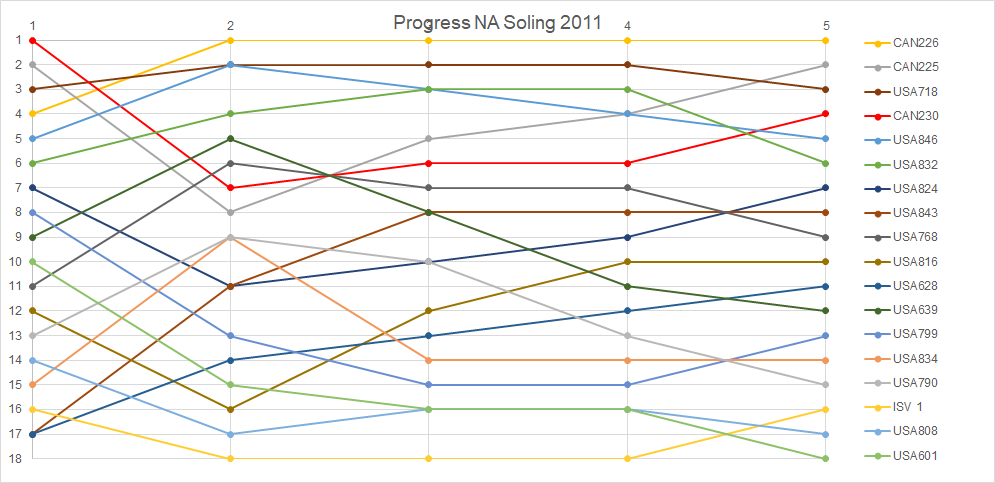

== 2012 Final results ==
2012
Event title
- Edition: 44
- Host: Portsmouth Olympic Harbour

Event details
- Venue: Lake Ontario
- Dates: 23 – 26 Aug
- Yachts: 11
- Opening ceremony: 23 Aug

Competitors
- Competitors: 33
- Competing nations: 3

Results
- (gold) Gold: Canada; Peter Hall; Paul Davis; Will Hall
- (silver) Silver: Canada; Hans Fogh; Gord Devries; John Finch
- (bronze) Bronze: Canada; Bill Abbott Jr. Joanne Abbott; Scott Bamford

Rank	Country	Helmsman	Crew	Sail No.	Race 1		Race 2		Race 3		Race 4		Race 5		Race 6		Race 7		Race 8		Race 9		Race 10		Total	Total – discard
Rank	Country	Helmsman	Crew	Sail No.	Pos.	Pts.	Pos.	Pts.	Pos.	Pts.	Pos.	Pts.	Pos.	Pts.	Pos.	Pts.	Pos.	Pts.	Pos.	Pts.	Pos.	Pts.	Pos.	Pts.	Total	Total – discard
1st place, gold medalist(s)	CAN	Peter Hall	Paul Davis; William Hall	CAN 225	1	1	1	1	1	1	~~4~~	~~4~~	2	2	1	1	~~3~~	~~3~~	3	3	1	1	3	3	20	13
2nd place, silver medalist(s)	CAN	Hans Fogh	Gord Devries; John Finch	CAN 230	2	2	~~3~~	~~3~~	2	2	3	3	3	3	~~4~~	~~4~~	2	2	1	1	2	2	1	1	23	16
3rd place, bronze medalist(s)	CAN	Bill Abbott Jr.	Joanne Abbott; Scott Bamford	CAN 1	4	4	2	2	3	3	1	1	1	1	~~5~~	~~5~~	1	1	2	2	3	3	~~5~~	~~5~~	27	17
4	USA	Andrew Dize	Henry Thomas; Joe Hidalgo	USA 798	3	3	5	5	~~DNF~~	~~12~~	2	2	~~8~~	~~8~~	6	6	4	4	6	6	4	4	7	7	57	38
5	CAN	Ken Davy	Tom Strang; Richard Boyles	CAN 210	7	7	4	4	4	4	6	6	4	4	8	8	~~10~~	~~10~~	~~9~~	~~9~~	6	6	2	2	60	41
6	CAN	Tom Mitchell	Francisco Perez; David Johnston	CAN 227	5	5	7	7	5	5	~~10~~	~~10~~	5	5	~~9~~	~~9~~	6	6	8	8	5	5	6	6	66	47
7	USA	Terry Booth	Brian McDonah; Bill Haliburton	USA 833	6	6	6	6	7	7	8	8	~~10~~	~~10~~	2	2	5	5	~~10~~	~~10~~	8	8	8	8	70	50
8	USA	Paul McGuan	Mark Keast; Ashley Henderson	USA 834	~~9~~	~~9~~	~~9~~	~~9~~	8	8	7	7	9	9	3	3	8	8	5	5	9	9	4	4	71	53
9	CAN	Manfred Kanter	Tom Freeman; Not documented	CAN 226	8	8	8	8	6	6	5	5	6	6	~~10~~	~~10~~	~~9~~	~~9~~	4	4	7	7	9	9	72	53
10	CAN	James Malpass	Andrew Malpass; Joe Cassidy	CAN 211	~~10~~	~~10~~	~~10~~	~~10~~	9	9	9	9	7	7	7	7	7	7	7	7	10	10	10	10	86	66
11	CAN	Peter Bennett	Joy Silver; Brian Silver	CAN 2251	~~DNF~~	~~12~~	~~DNF~~	~~12~~	DNF	12	11	11	11	11	11	11	11	11	11	11	11	11	11	11	113	89

Legend: DNC – Did not come to the starting area; DSQ – Disqualified; RET – Retired;
Discard is crossed out and does not count for the overall result.
Gender: – male; – female;

- 2012 Progress

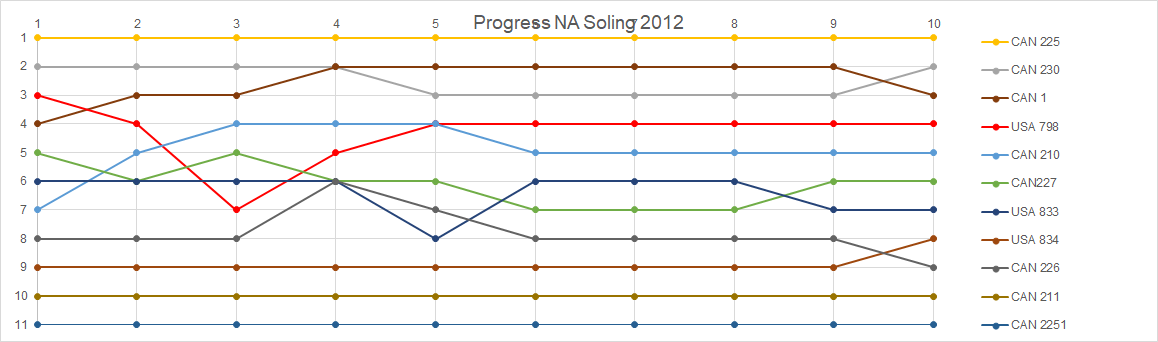

== 2013 Final results ==
2013
Event title
- Edition: 45
- Host: Valcour Sailing Club

Event details
- Venue: Lake Champlain
- Dates: 23 – 26 Aug
- Yachts: 16
- Opening ceremony: 23 Aug

Competitors
- Competitors: 48
- Competing nations: 3

Results
- (gold) Gold: Canada; Hans Fogh; Ross Findlater; Gord Devries
- (silver) Silver: Canada; Bill Abbott Jr. Joanne Abbott; Scott Bamford
- (bronze) Bronze: Canada; Peter Hall; Steve Lacey; Will Hall

Rank	Country	Helmsman	Crew	Sail No.	Race 1		Race 2		Race 3		Race 4		Race 5		Race 6		Race 7		Race 8		Race 9		Total	Total – discard
Rank	Country	Helmsman	Crew	Sail No.	Pos.	Pts.	Pos.	Pts.	Pos.	Pts.	Pos.	Pts.	Pos.	Pts.	Pos.	Pts.	Pos.	Pts.	Pos.	Pts.	Pos.	Pts.	Total	Total – discard
1st place, gold medalist(s)	CAN	Hans Fogh	Ross Findlater; Gord Devries	CAN 230	1	1	1	1	1	1	3	3	3	3	1	1	4	4	2	2	~~DNS~~	~~17~~	33	16
2nd place, silver medalist(s)	CAN	Bill Abbott Jr.	Joanne Abbott; Scott Banford	CAN 1	2	2	2	2	~~6~~	~~6~~	4	4	2	2	2	2	1	1	3	3	2	2	24	18
3rd place, bronze medalist(s)	CAN	Peter Hall	Steve Lacey; William Hall	CAN 225	5	5	3	3	5	5	~~7~~	~~7~~	1	1	3	3	7	7	1	1	1	1	33	26
4	GER	Roman Koch	Andrew Malpass; Mike Parsons	GER 1	11	11	4	4	8	8	2	2	4	4	~~OTL~~	~~14.5~~	2	2	4	4	4	4	53.5	39
5	GER	Michael Deitzel	Anna Deitzel; Hannes Ramoser	GER 328	8	8	7	7	~~10~~	~~10~~	6	6	6	6	4	4	3	3	5	5	7	7	56	46
6	USA	Ross Richards	Colin Richards; Patrick Richards	USA 816	6	6	~~12~~	~~12~~	3	3	9	9	8	8	11	11	5	5	10	10	9	9	73	61
7	CAN	Tom Mitchell	David Johnston; Bruce Fielding	CAN 227	7	7	8	8	9	9	~~16~~	~~16~~	5	5	9	9	15	15	9	9	3	3	81	65
8	USA	Stuart H. Walker	John Standiford; Robyn Doyle	USA 839	13	13	5	5	7	7	1	1	11	11	6	6	~~14~~	~~14~~	11	11	13	13	81	67
9	CAN	Terry Booth	Bill Haliburton; Steve McDonah	CAN 236	4	4	11	11	11	11	10	10	~~14~~	~~14~~	5	5	10	10	6	6	10	10	81	67
10	USA	Mark Stata	Noah Fallon; Craig Stay	USA 835	9	9	6	6	~~13~~	~~13~~	11	11	9	9	10	10	8	8	7	7	12	12	85	72
11	USA	Stephen Bobo	Jeff Spence; Peter Carson	USA 843	~~14~~	~~14~~	10	10	12	12	5	5	13	13	7	7	13	13	8	8	8	8	90	76
12	USA	Andrew Dize	Mary Sophia Smith; Joe Hidalgo	USA 798	3	3	13	13	4	4	13	13	7	7	12	12	11	11	15	15	~~DNS~~	~~17~~	95	78
13	USA	Bruce Gugliata	Brian White; Brad Dumas	USA 780	15	15	14	14	2	2	8	8	12	12	OTL	14.5	9	9	~~16~~	~~16~~	11	11	101.5	85.5
14	CAN	Blair Tully	Tom Freeman; Dave Veldstra	CAN 96	12	12	9	9	~~16~~	~~16~~	12	12	16	16	8	8	16	16	12	12	6	6	107	91
15	USA	Andy Sajor	Ed Tromblay; Ty Kretser	USA 812	~~DNF~~	~~17~~	15	15	14	14	14	14	10	10	OTL	14.5	6	6	14	14	5	5	109.5	92.5
16	USA	Henry Thomas	Max Ryder; Jack Ryder	USA 799	10	10	16	16	15	15	15	15	15	15	OTL	14.5	12	12	13	13	~~DNS~~	~~17~~	127.5	110.5

Legend: DNC – Did not come to the starting area; DNF – Did not finish; DNS – Did not start; DSQ – Disqualified; OCS – On the course side of the starting line; OTL – Over time limit; RET – Retired;
Discard is crossed out and does not count for the overall result.
Gender: – male; – female;

- 2013 Progress

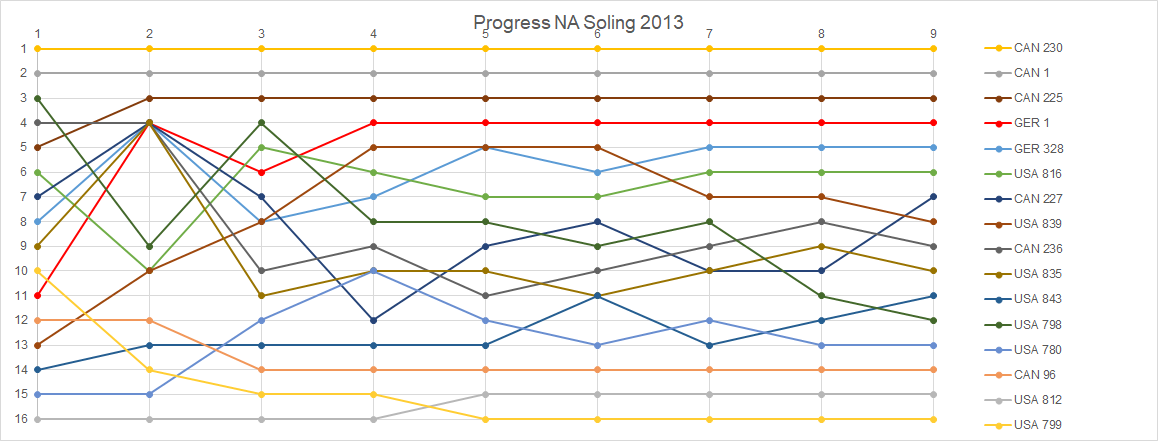

== 2014 Final results ==
2014
Event title
- Edition: 46
- Host: Port Stanley Sailing Club

Event details
- Venue: Lake Erie
- Dates: 18 – 21 Sep
- Yachts: 28
- Opening ceremony: 18 Sep

Competitors
- Competitors: 84
- Competing nations: 3

Results
- (gold) Gold: Canada; Peter Hall; Paul Davis; Will Hall
- (silver) Silver: Canada; Bill Abbott Jr. Larry Abbott; Joanne Abbott
- (bronze) Bronze: Canada; Thomas Fogh; Roger Cheer; Gord Devries

Rank	Country	Helmsman	Crew	Sail No.	Race 1		Race 2		Race 3		Race 4		Race 5		Race 6		Total	Total – discard
Rank	Country	Helmsman	Crew	Sail No.	Pos.	Pts.	Pos.	Pts.	Pos.	Pts.	Pos.	Pts.	Pos.	Pts.	Pos.	Pts.	Total	Total – discard
1st place, gold medalist(s)	CAN	Peter Hall	Paul Davis; Will Hall	CAN 225	2	2	3	3	1	1	1	1	1	1	~~DNC~~	~~29~~	37.0	8.0
2nd place, silver medalist(s)	CAN	Bill Abbott Jr.	Larry Abbott; Joanne Abbott	CAN 1	1	1	1	1	~~3~~	~~3~~	3	3	3	3	1	1	12.0	9.0
3rd place, bronze medalist(s)	CAN	Thomas Fogh	Roger Cheer; Gord Devries	CAN 230	~~5~~	~~5~~	2	2	2	2	4	4	2	2	2	2	17.0	12.0
4	GER	Roman Koch	Andrew Malpass; Mike Parsons	GER 1	~~8~~	~~8~~	4	4	4	4	2	2	4	4	3	3	25.0	17.0
5	GER	Michael Dietzel	Hannes Ramsmoser; Tim Schuette	GER 328	4	4	21	2	5	5	5	5	6	6	9	9	50.0	29.0
6	USA	Charlie Kamps	Jeremy McMahon; Lucas Hiller	USA 832	3	3	5	5	10	10	7	7	5	5	~~DNC~~	~~29~~	59.0	30.0
7	CAN	Ken Davy	BerkKadagil; Richard Boyle	CAN 210	7	7	~~10~~	~~10~~	8	8	9	9	7	7	4	4	45.0	35.0
8	CAN	Bill Haliburton	Steven McDonalt; Terry Booth	CAN 236	~~15~~	~~15~~	7	7	11	11	6	6	8	8	7	7	54.0	39.0
9	USA	David Baum	Bill Bresser; James Bruss	USA 845	~~20~~	~~20~~	8	8	7	7	12	12	9	9	RDG	6	62.0	42.0
10	USA	Steve Bobo	Jeff Spence; Cooper Anderson	USA 843	12	12	9	9	19	19	8	8	~~15~~	~~15~~	10	10	73.0	54.0
11	USA	John Kennedy	Claudio Martin; Brendan Kennedy	USA 818	13	13	~~RET~~	~~29~~	17	17	10	10	12	12	5	5	86.0	57.0
12	USA	Dave Crysdale	Dan Hanna; Nicholas Hennigan	USA 824	10	10	6	6	14	14	14	14	14	14	~~DNF~~	~~29~~	87.0	58.0
13	CAN	Blair Tully	Steven Donker; Dave Veldstra	CAN 96	16	16	16	16	9	9	11	11	10	10	~~DNF~~	~~29~~	91.0	62.0
14	USA	Tom Elliott	Dick Kenney; John Bayldon	USA 768	~~21~~	~~21~~	13	13	16	16	19	19	11	11	6	6	86.0	65.0
15	USA	Matias Collins	Dowson Vixon; Sigried Dietzel	USA 828	18	18	~~DNC~~	~~29~~	18	18	18	18	13	13	8	8	104.0	75.0
16	CAN	Tom Mitchell	Peter Carson; Matt McLaren	CAN 227	11	11	18	18	6	6	13	13	~~DNC~~	~~29~~	DNC	29	106.0	77.0
17	CAN	Manfred Kanter	Anne Marie Willan; Kevin Dutra	CAN 226	6	6	10	10	RDG	18.75	RDG	18.75	~~DNF~~	~~29~~	DNC	29	111.5	82.5
18	USA	Henry Thomas	Gary Greenwood; Al Tierney	USA 852	19	19	15	15	13	13	16	16	~~DNC~~	~~29~~	DNC	29	121.0	92.0
19	CAN	Tom Freemann	John McNeil; Kristie Weibe	CAN 233	14	14	14	14	20	20	21	21	~~DNF~~	~~29~~	DNC	29	127.0	98.0
20	USA	Paul McGuan	Mark Keast; Ashley Henderson	USA 834	22	22	15	15	15	15	17	17	~~DNC~~	~~29~~	DNC	29	127.0	98.0
21	USA	Stuart H. Walker	Karen Temple; Matthew Sturr	USA 839	17	17	12	12	~~RET~~	~~29~~	20	20	DNC	29	DNC	29	136.0	107.0
22	USA	Andy Dize	Mary Smith; David Jochum	USA 798	9	9	~~OCS~~	~~29~~	12	12	OCS	29	DNC	29	DNC	29	137.0	108.0
23	CAN	Jim Malpass	Ted Paul; Joe Cassidy	CAN 211	24	24	19	19	21	21	15	15	~~DNC~~	~~29~~	DNC	29	137.0	108.0
24	GER	Michael Karda	Daniel McNeil; Maria Bukli	GER 11	23	23	20	20	22	22	23	23	~~DNC~~	~~29~~	DNC	29	146.0	117.0
25	USA	Bob Chantler	Paul Lovelock; Daniel Gagnier	USA 744	26	26	23	23	23	23	24	24	~~DNC~~	~~29~~	DNC	29	154.0	125.0
26	CAN	Ken Holland	Alex Vendrig; Allen Cook	CAN 238	~~DSQ~~	~~29~~	24	24	DNC	29	22	22	DNC	29	DNC	29	162.0	133.0
27	CAN	Garry Graham	Glen Graham; Chris Graham	CAN 232	25	25	22	22	~~DNF~~	~~29~~	DNC	29	DNC	29	DNC	29	163.0	134.0
28	CAN	Petter Benneth	Brian Silver; Joy Silver	CAN 2251	~~DNC~~	~~29~~	DNC	29	RET	29	RET	29	DNC	29	DNC	29	174.0	145.0

Legend: DNC – Did not come to the starting area; DNF – Did not finish; DNS – Did not start; DSQ – Disqualified; OCS – On the course side of the starting line; OTL – Over time limit; RET – Retired;
Discard is crossed out and does not count for the overall result.
Gender: – male; – female;

- 2014 Progress

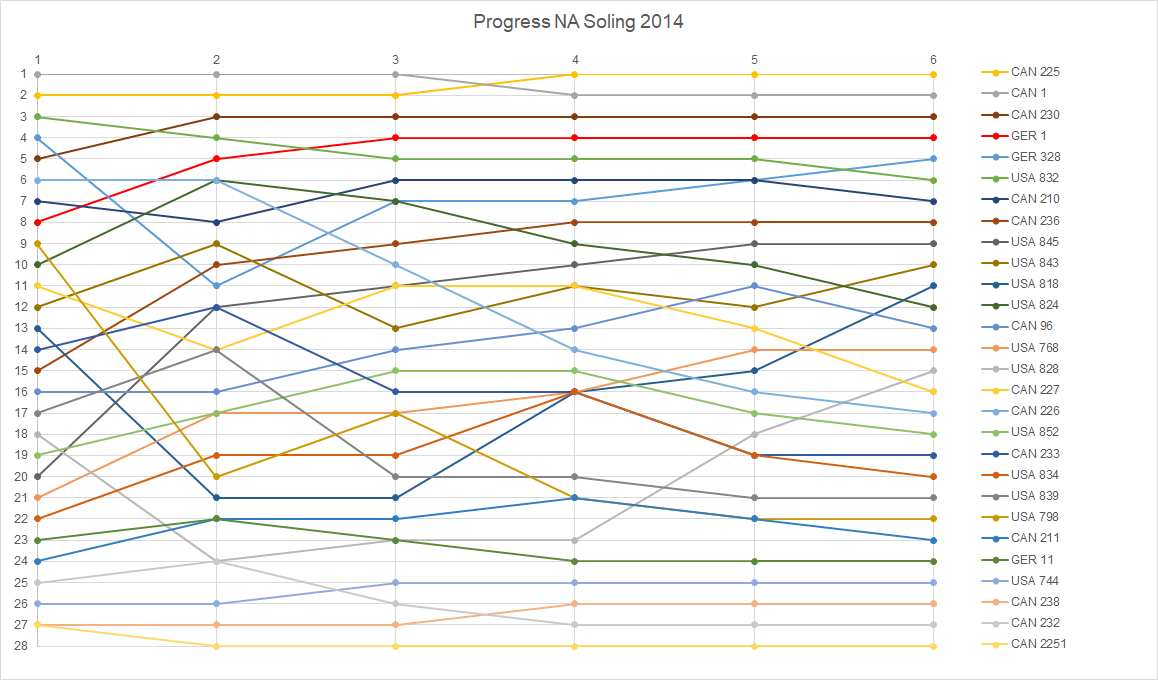

== 2015 Final results ==
2015
Event title
- Edition: 47
- Host: Wilmette Yacht Club

Event details
- Venue: Lake Michigan
- Dates: 27 – 30 Aug
- Yachts: 18
- Opening ceremony: 27 Aug

Competitors
- Competitors: 54
- Competing nations: 3

Results
- (gold) Gold: Canada; Peter Hall; Steve Lacey; Will Hall
- (silver) Silver: Canada; Thomas Fogh; Ross Findlater; Gord Devries
- (bronze) Bronze: Germany; Michael Dietzel; Tim Schutte; Hannes Ramoser

Rank	Country	Helmsman	Crew	Sail No.	Race 1		Race 2		Race 3		Race 4		Total
Rank	Country	Helmsman	Crew	Sail No.	Pos.	Pts.	Pos.	Pts.	Pos.	Pts.	Pos.	Pts.	Total
1st place, gold medalist(s)	CAN	Peter Hall	Steve Lacey; Will Hall	CAN 225	1	1	1	1	1	1	8	8	11
2nd place, silver medalist(s)	CAN	Thomas Fogh	Ross Findlater; Gord Devries	CAN 230	2	2	13	13	2	2	1	1	18
3rd place, bronze medalist(s)	GER	Michael Dietzel	Tim Schutte; Hannes Ramoser	GER 11	5	5	8	8	3	3	6	6	22
4	CAN	Manfred Kanter	Anne Marie Willan; Kevin Dutra	CAN 226	6	6	2	2	6	6	9	9	23
5	GER	Roman Koch	Martin Zeileis; Patrick Wichmann	GER 1	4	4	3	3	8	8	10	10	25
6	USA	Ross Adams	Michael Brown; A.J. Brown	USA 778	8	8	6	6	4	4	14	14	32
7	USA	Charlie Kamps	Vytas Kasmiunas; Scott Stroud	USA 832	9	9	14	14	10	10	3	3	36
8	USA	William Turner	Kevin Shockey; Peter Bujosa	USA 796	7	7	OCS	19	12	12	2	2	40
9	USA	Henry Thomas	Coralie Thomas; Tom Mitchell	USA 852	16	16	4	4	7	7	15	15	42
10	USA	Tom Elliott	Jon Bayldon; Dick Kinney	USA 768	13	13	9	9	16	16	4	4	42
11	USA	John Kennedy	John Nawn; Willie Rozanski	USA 818	14	14	10	10	13	13	5	5	42
12	USA	Stuart H. Walker	Boomer Mazanec; C.J. Lee	USA 839	11	11	5	5	14	14	12	12	42
13	USA	Steve Bobo	Cooper Anderson; Gavin Adams	USA 843	15	15	12	12	9	9	7	7	43
14	USA	Ross Richards	Colin Richards; Hyde Perce	USA 816	3	3	OCS	19	5	5	DNF	19	46
15	USA	David Slaght	Kent Smith; Kent Johnson	USA 628	12	12	11	11	11	11	16	16	50
16	USA	Bob Nickel	Buckley Crist; Pete Buerger	USA 808	17	17	7	7	17	17	11	11	52
17	USA	David Baum	Bill Bresser; James Bruss	USA 845	10	10	15	15	15	15	13	13	53
18	USA	Theodore Herr	Brian Herr; Adrian Herr	USA 758	DNF	19	DNF	19	18	18	DNF	19	75

Legend: DNC – Did not come to the starting area; DNF – Did not finish; DNS – Did not start; DSQ – Disqualified; OCS – On the course side of the starting line; OTL – Over time limit; RET – Retired;
Discard is crossed out and does not count for the overall result.
Gender: – male; – female;

- 2015 Progress

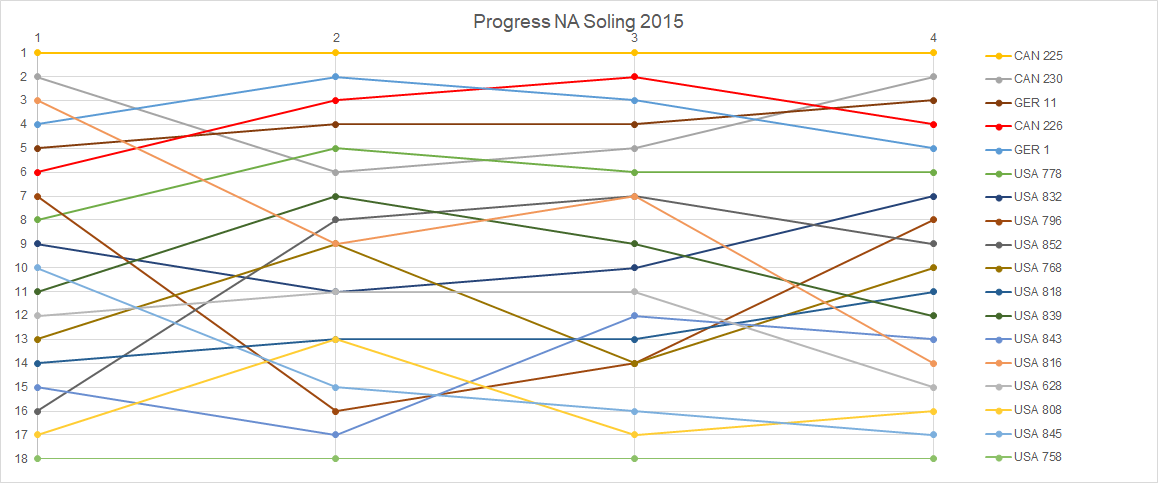

== 2016 Final results ==
2016
Event title
- Edition: 48
- Host: Sarnia Yacht Club

Event details
- Venue: Lake Huron
- Dates: 23 – 26 Jun
- Yachts: 16
- Opening ceremony: 23 Jun

Competitors
- Competitors: 48
- Competing nations: 3

Results
- (gold) Gold: Canada; Bill Abbott Jr. Paul Davis; Joanne Abbott
- (silver) Silver: Canada; Peter Hall; Will Hall; Ross Findlate
- (bronze) Bronze: Canada; Thomas Fogh; Roger Cheer; Gord Devries

Rank	Country	Helmsman	Crew	Sail No.	Race 1		Race 2		Race 3		Race 4		Race 5		Race 6		Race 7		Race 8		Race 9		Total	Total – discard
Rank	Country	Helmsman	Crew	Sail No.	Pos.	Pts.	Pos.	Pts.	Pos.	Pts.	Pos.	Pts.	Pos.	Pts.	Pos.	Pts.	Pos.	Pts.	Pos.	Pts.	Pos.	Pts.	Total	Total – discard
1st place, gold medalist(s)	CAN	Bill Abbott Jr.	Paul Davis; Joanne Abbott	CAN 1	2	2	~~3~~	~~3~~	1	1	1	1	1	1	1	1	2	2	1	1	1	1	13	10
2nd place, silver medalist(s)	CAN	Peter Hall	Will Hall; Ross Findlater	CAN 225	1	1	1	1	2	2	~~4~~	~~4~~	3	3	3	3	1	1	2	2	3	3	20	16
3rd place, bronze medalist(s)	CAN	Thomas Fogh	Roger Cheer; Gord Devries	CAN 230	3	3	5	5	5	5	2	2	2	2	5	5	3	3	3	3	~~9~~	~~9~~	37	28
4	GER	Michael Dietzel	Martin Zeileis; Hannes Ramoser	GER 11	4	4	2	2	3	3	6	6	7	7	6	6	~~8~~	~~8~~	4	4	2	2	42	34
5	CAN	Kenneth Davy	Richard Boyles; Steve Lacey	CAN 210	8	8	7	7	4	4	3	3	5	5	4	4	9	9	8	8	~~DSQ~~	~~17~~	65	48
6	USA	Charlie Kamps	Jon Bailey; Vytas Kasniunas	USA 832	7	7	~~10~~	~~10~~	10	10	7	7	4	4	2	2	6	6	10	10	4	4	60	50
7	CAN	William Haliburton	Stephen McDonah; Terry Booth	CAN 236	5	5	~~13~~	~~13~~	6	6	9	9	13	13	11	11	4	4	7	7	6	6	74	61
8	USA	Matias Collins	Derek Barke; Mariano Cambon	USA 853	~~14~~	~~14~~	9	9	8	8	10	10	6	6	9	9	7	7	5	5	8	8	76	62
9	CAN	Manfred Kanter	Anne Marie Willan; Kevin Dutra	CAN 226	~~13~~	~~13~~	4	4	7	7	8	8	9	9	12	12	5	5	11	11	13	13	82	69
10	USA	David Baum	Bill Bresser; James Bruss	USA 845	6	6	11	11	14	14	5	5	11	11	~~16~~	~~16~~	10	10	12	12	5	5	90	74
11	CAN	Tom Freeman	Blair Tully; Dave Veldstra	CAN 233	12	12	6	6	11	11	12	12	8	8	~~15~~	~~15~~	13	13	6	6	12	12	95	80
12	CAN	Tom Mitchell	John McNeil; Matt MacLaren	CAN 227	9	9	8	8	9	9	14	14	12	12	7	7	~~16~~	~~16~~	15	15	7	7	97	81
13	USA	Andrew Dize	Joe Hidalgo; Matthew Sturr	USA 798	11	11	12	12	12	12	~~15~~	~~15~~	14	14	8	8	11	11	9	9	14	14	106	91
14	USA	Henry Thomas	Steve Donker; Coralie Thomas	USA 852	10	10	14	14	13	13	11	11	10	10	13	13	~~15~~	~~15~~	13	13	11	11	110	95
15	USA	Tom Elliott	Dick Kinney; John Bayldon	USA 768	16	16	15	15	15	15	~~16~~	~~16~~	15	15	10	10	12	12	14	14	15	15	128	112
16	USA	Paul McGuan	Mark Keast; Sam House	USA 834	15	15	~~16~~	~~16~~	16	16	13	13	16	16	14	14	14	14	16	16	10	10	130	114

Legend: DNC – Did not come to the starting area; DNF – Did not finish; DNS – Did not start; DSQ – Disqualified; OCS – On the course side of the starting line; OTL – Over time limit; RET – Retired;
Discard is crossed out and does not count for the overall result.
Gender: – male; – female;

- 2016 Progress

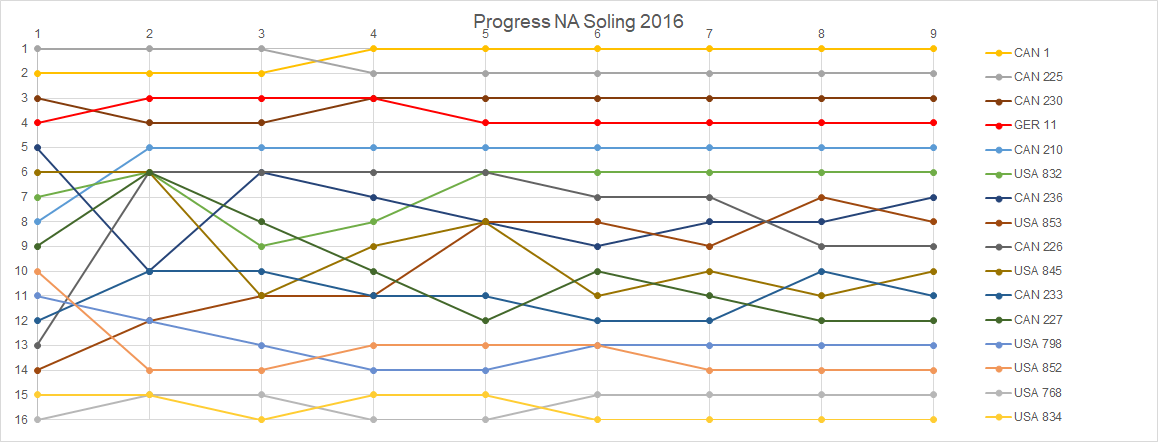

== 2017 Final results ==
2017
Event title
- Edition: 49,
- Host: Milwaukee Yacht Club

Event details
- Venue: Lake Michigan
- Dates: 24 – 27 Aug
- Yachts: 15
- Opening ceremony: 24 Aug

Competitors
- Competitors: 45
- Competing nations: 3

Results
- (gold) Gold: Canada; Peter Hall; William Hall; Gord Devries
- (silver) Silver: Germany; Michael Dietzel; Hannes Ramoser; Connor Clafin
- (bronze) Bronze: United States; Ross Richards; Patrick Richards; Drew Kosmoskis

Rank	Country	Helmsman	Crew	Sail No.	Race 1		Race 2		Race 3		Race 4		Race 5		Race 6		Race 7		Race 8		Total	Total – discard
Rank	Country	Helmsman	Crew	Sail No.	Pos.	Pts.	Pos.	Pts.	Pos.	Pts.	Pos.	Pts.	Pos.	Pts.	Pos.	Pts.	Pos.	Pts.	Pos.	Pts.	Total	Total – discard
1st place, gold medalist(s)	CAN	Peter Hall	Will Hall; Gord Devries	CAN 225	1	1	1	1	1	1	1	1	~~5~~	~~5~~	1	1	1	1	1	1	12	7
2nd place, silver medalist(s)	GER	Michael Dietzel	Hannes Ramoser; Connor Clafin	GER 11	2	2	4	4	~~10~~	~~10~~	3	3	3	3	4	4	3	3	5	5	34	24
3rd place, bronze medalist(s)	USA	Ross Richards	Patrick Richards; Drew Kosmoski	USA 816	8	8	2	2	3	3	5	5	1	1	7	7	~~10~~	~~10~~	7	7	43	33
4	USA	David Baum	Bill Bresser; James Bruss	USA 845	6	6	6	6	5	5	6	6	~~11~~	~~11~~	5	5	4	4	6	6	49	38
5	GER	Roman Koch	Martin Zeileis; Hermann Wegener	GER 1	3	3	9	9	2	2	~~13~~	~~13~~	7	7	8	8	7	7	3	3	52	39
6	USA	Tyler Black	Hays Formella; Ashley Henderson	USA 601	9	9	3	3	7	7	10	10	~~13~~	~~13~~	9	9	2	2	2	2	55	42
7	USA	Charlie Kamps	Jon Bailey; Vytas Kasniunas	USA 832	5	5	7	7	8	8	8	8	~~9~~	~~9~~	2	2	9	9	4	4	52	43
8	USA	Dave Crysdale	Mason Chrabaszcz; Owen Bradley	USA 824	4	4	11	11	4	4	4	4	2	2	~~OCS~~	~~16~~	6	6	RET	16	63	47
9	USA	Stephen Bobo	Lars Mathiesen; Dan Hanna	USA 843	7	7	5	5	~~11~~	~~11~~	7	7	6	6	11	11	8	8	8	8	63	52
10	USA	Steve Dolan	Sam House; Scott Evans	USA 846	11	11	8	8	9	9	~~14~~	~~14~~	4	4	6	6	5	5	12	12	69	55
11	USA	Paul McGuan	Mark Keast; Christopher Bisenius	USA 834	10	10	10	10	6	6	2	2	~~14~~	~~14~~	12	12	11	11	10	10	75	61
12	USA	Tom Elliott	John Bayldon; Bob Nickel	USA 768	12	12	12	12	~~14~~	~~14~~	11	11	10	10	3	3	12	12	9	9	83	69
13	USA	Henry Thomas	Bob Turner; Mary Smith	USA 852	~~13~~	~~13~~	13	13	10	10	9	9	8	8	10	10	13	13	11	11	87	74
14	USA	Dave Slaght	Kent Smith; Sarah Piraino	USA 802	~~15~~	~~15~~	15	15	13	13	12	12	12	12	13	13	14	14	14	14	108	93
15	USA	Dick Kinney	Mary Cimrmancic; Jim Wend	USA 785	14	14	~~RET~~	~~16~~	DNS	16	15	15	15	15	14	14	15	15	13	13	118	102

Legend: DNC – Did not come to the starting area; DNF – Did not finish; DNS – Did not start; DSQ – Disqualified; OCS – On the course side of the starting line; OTL – Over time limit; RET – Retired;
Discard is crossed out and does not count for the overall result.
Gender: – male; – female;

- 2017 Progress

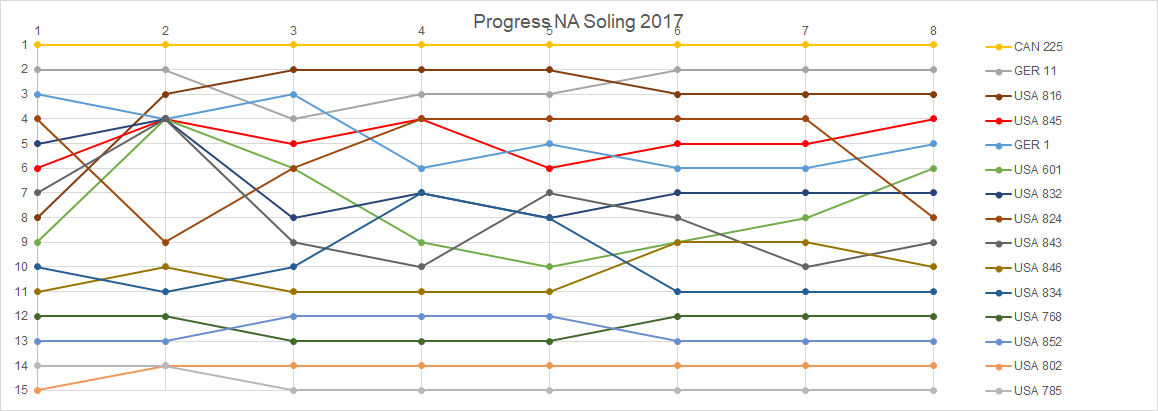

== 2018 Final results ==
2018
Event title
- Edition: 50,
- Host: Royal St. Lawrence Yacht Club

Event details
- Venue: Lake Saint-Louis
- Dates: 27 – 30 Sep
- Yachts: 17
- Opening ceremony: 27 Sep

Competitors
- Competitors: 51
- Competing nations: 3

Results
- (gold) Gold: Canada; Manfred Kanter; Anne Marie Willain; Gord Devries
- (silver) Silver: Canada; Bill Abbott Jr. Joanne Abbott; Scott McNeil
- (bronze) Bronze: Canada; Peter Hall; Will Hall; Steve Lacey

Rank	Country	Helmsman	Crew	Sail No.	Race 1		Race 2		Race 3		Race 4		Race 5		Race 6		Race 7		Race 8		Total	Total – discard
Rank	Country	Helmsman	Crew	Sail No.	Pos.	Pts.	Pos.	Pts.	Pos.	Pts.	Pos.	Pts.	Pos.	Pts.	Pos.	Pts.	Pos.	Pts.	Pos.	Pts.	Total	Total – discard
1st place, gold medalist(s)	CAN	Manfred Kanter	Anne Marie Willain; Gord Devries	CAN 231	~~6~~	~~6~~	2	2	3	3	1	1	3	3	2	2	2	2	1	1	20	14
2nd place, silver medalist(s)	CAN	Bill Abbott Jr.	Joanne Abbott; Scott McNeil	CAN 1	2	2	1	1	~~5~~	~~5~~	4	4	1	1	3	3	1	1	4	4	21	16
3rd place, bronze medalist(s)	CAN	Peter Hall	William Hall; Steve Lacey	CAN 225	~~10~~	~~10~~	7	7	1	1	3	3	4	4	4	4	3	3	2	2	34	24
4	GER	Roman Koch	Martin Zeileis; Michael Dietzel	GER 1	1	1	6	6	8	8	~~10~~	~~10~~	5	5	1	1	6	6	3	3	40	30
5	CAN	William Haliburton	Brian Milne; Terry Booth	CAN 236	9	9	8	8	6	6	~~15~~	~~15~~	2	2	8	8	7	7	5	5	60	45
6	USA	Stephen Bobo	Jon Bailey; Dan Hanna	USA 843	8	8	4	4	4	4	7	7	8	8	7	7	9	9	~~10~~	~~10~~	57	47
7	USA	Paul McGuan	Mark Keast; Ashley Henderson	USA 834	3	3	5	5	12	12	5	5	6	6	10	10	12	12	~~16~~	~~16~~	69	53
8	CAN	Tom Freeman	Blair Tully; Dave Veldstra	CAN 233	5	5	9	9	~~15~~	~~15~~	11	11	12	12	6	6	4	4	11	11	73	58
9	USA	John Kennedy	Brett Eickenberg; George Vincent	USA 818	~~DNF~~	~~18~~	13	13	2	2	2	2	9	9	17	17	5	5	14	14	80	62
10	USA	David Baum	Cate Muller; Brian Lennie	USA 845	4	4	3	3	~~14~~	~~14~~	13	13	13	13	12	12	11	11	7	7	77	63
11	USA	Matias Collins	Peter Norman; Roland van Hazel	USA 853	12	12	12	12	7	7	~~14~~	~~14~~	10	10	5	5	10	10	8	8	78	64
12	USA	Henry Thomas	Chase Wood; Jeff Connoly	USA 852	14	14	~~15~~	~~15~~	9	9	9	9	7	7	9	9	13	13	9	9	85	70
13	USA	Dick Kinney	Antoinine Paccarrar; John Balydon	USA 808	7	7	10	10	13	13	6	6	11	11	14	14	14	14	~~15~~	~~15~~	90	75
14	USA	Andrew Dize	Marie Sophie Smith; Axel Galpy-Masse	USA 798	11	11	~~17~~	~~17~~	11	11	12	12	14	14	11	11	15	15	6	6	97	80
15	CAN	John Beauregard	Peter Koppes; Gunnar Beauregard	CAN 239	13	13	14	14	~~16~~	~~16~~	8	8	15	15	15	15	8	8	12	12	101	85
16	CAN	Steve Donker	John McNeil; Luke Intven	CAN 226	~~16~~	~~16~~	11	11	10	10	16	16	16	16	13	13	16	16	13	13	111	95
17	CAN	Peter Bennett	Joy Silver; Jerry Gasiorowski	CAN 2251	15	15	16	16	17	17	17	17	17	17	16	16	17	17	~~RET~~	~~18~~	133	115

Legend: DNC – Did not come to the starting area; DNF – Did not finish; DNS – Did not start; DSQ – Disqualified; OCS – On the course side of the starting line; OTL – Over time limit; RET – Retired;
Discard is crossed out and does not count for the overall result.
Gender: – male; – female;

- 2018 Progress

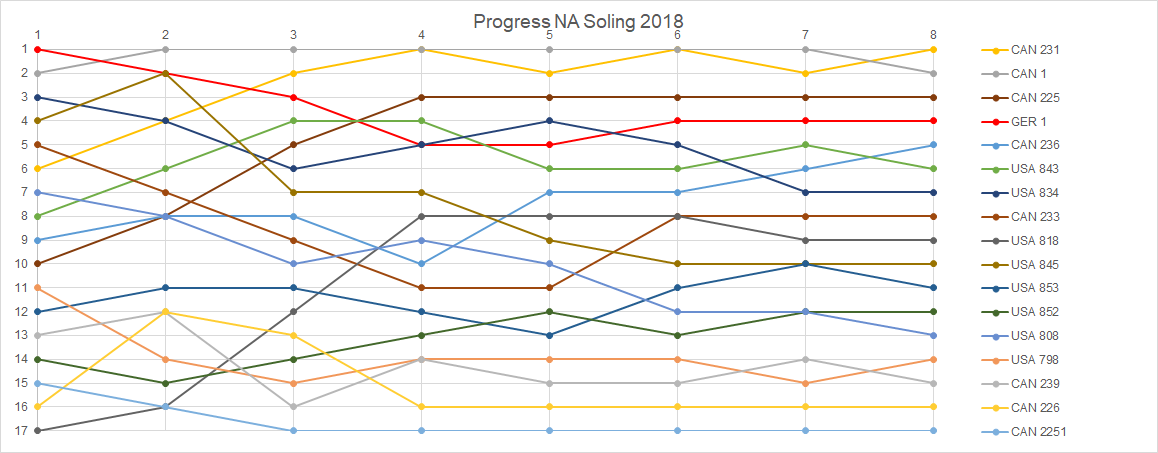

== 2019 Final results ==
2019
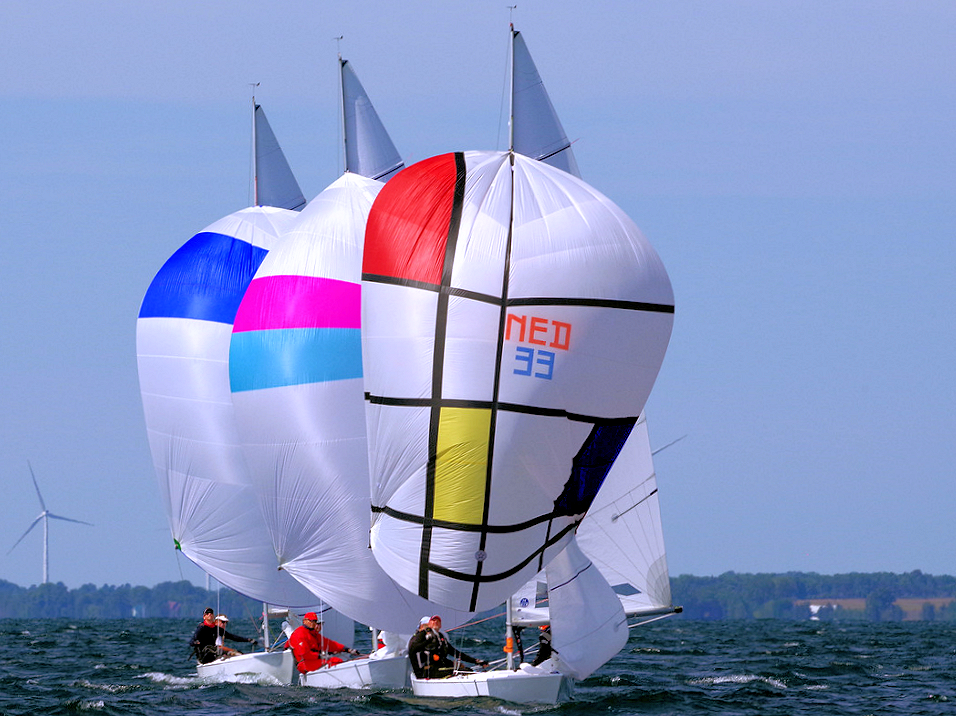

Event title
- Edition: 51,
- Host: Portsmouth Olympic Harbour

Event details
- Venue: Lake Ontario
- Dates: 8 – 11 Aug
- Yachts: 13
- Opening ceremony: 8 Aug

Competitors
- Competitors: 39
- Competing nations: 4

Results
- (gold) Gold: Netherlands; Rudy den Outer; Theo de Lange; Thies Bosch
- (silver) Silver: Canada; Bill Abbott Jr. Paul Davis; Joanne Abbott
- (bronze) Bronze: Canada; Peter Hall; Will Hall; Scott McNeil

Rank	Country	Helmsman	Crew	Sail No.	Race 1		Race 2		Race 3		Race 4		Race 5		Race 6		Race 7		Race 8		Race 9		Race 10		Total	Total – discard
Rank	Country	Helmsman	Crew	Sail No.	Pos.	Pts.	Pos.	Pts.	Pos.	Pts.	Pos.	Pts.	Pos.	Pts.	Pos.	Pts.	Pos.	Pts.	Pos.	Pts.	Pos.	Pts.	Pos.	Pts.	Total	Total – discard
1st place, gold medalist(s)	NED	Rudy den Outer	Theo de Lange; Thies Bosch	NED 33	2	2	2	2	1	1	2	2	3	3	2	2	~~6~~	~~6~~	2	2	1	1	1	1	22	16
2nd place, silver medalist(s)	CAN	Bill Abbott Jr.	Paul Davis; Joanne Abbott	CAN 1	4	4	3	3	~~5~~	~~5~~	1	1	1	1	1	1	2	2	3	3	2	2	2	2	24	19
3rd place, bronze medalist(s)	CAN	Peter Hall	Will Hall; Scott McNeil	CAN 225	3	3	6	6	2	2	~~DNF~~	~~14~~	2	2	4	4	1	1	1	1	3	3	3	3	39	25
4	CAN	John Finch	Ross Findlater; Gord Devries	CAN 210	5	5	1	1	4	4	3	3	4	4	3	3	~~8~~	~~8~~	4	4	5	5	5	5	42	34
5	GER	Roman Koch	Felix Kling; Lukas Neum	GER 1	1	1	4	4	3	3	4	4	6	6	~~8~~	~~8~~	3	3	5	5	7	7	4	4	45	37
6	GER	Michael Dietzel	Martin Zeileis; Anton Dietzel	GER 11	6	6	5	5	~~7~~	~~7~~	5	5	5	5	6	6	4	4	6	6	4	4	6	6	54	47
7	CAN	Bill Haliburton	Bryan Milne; Terry Booth	CAN 236	7	7	7	7	6	6	~~10~~	~~10~~	7	7	10	10	7	7	9	9	8	8	8	8	79	69
8	USA	Dave Crysdale	Wataru Kondo; Christian Cushman	USA 824	8	8	~~RET~~	~~14~~	9	9	8	8	8	8	7	7	5	5	8	8	10	10	10	10	87	73
9	USA	Matias Collins	Magda Resano; Joy Silver; Craig Pirie	USA 828	11	11	12	12	11	11	6	6	10	10	5	5	10	10	7	7	~~13~~	~~13~~	9	9	94	81
10	USA	Paul McGuan	Mark Keast; Ashley Henderson	USA 834	9	9	8	8	10	10	7	7	9	9	9	9	9	9	13	13	11	11	~~RET~~	~~14~~	99	85
11	CAN	Tom Freemann	Blair Tuly; Dave Veldstra	CAN 233	10	10	10	10	8	8	9	9	~~RET~~	~~14~~	11	11	OCS	14	12	12	6	6	7	7	101	87
12	CAN	John Beauregard	Peter Koppes; Gunnar Beauregard	CAN 239	~~13~~	~~13~~	11	11	12	12	11	11	11	11	12	12	12	12	11	11	9	9	11	11	113	100
13	USA	Karin Olsen Campia	Herny Thomas; Joseph Hidalgo	USA 226	12	12	9	9	~~DNF~~	~~14~~	DNC	14	DNC	14	13	13	11	11	10	10	12	12	RET	14	123	109

Legend: DNC – Did not come to the starting area; DNF – Did not finish; DNS – Did not start; DSQ – Disqualified; OCS – On the course side of the starting line; OTL – Over time limit; RET – Retired;
Discard is crossed out and does not count for the overall result.
Gender: – male; – female;

- 2019 Progress

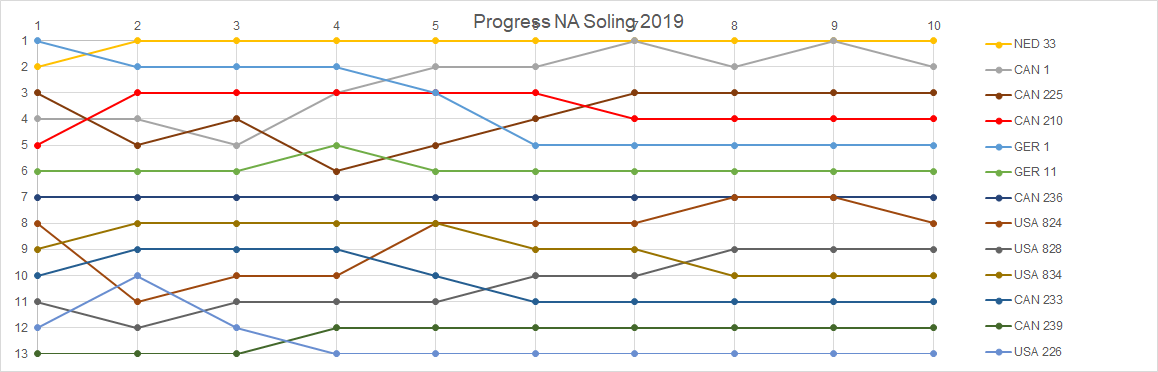

== Further results ==
For further results see:

- Soling North American Championship results (1969–79)
- Soling North American Championship results (1980–89)
- Soling North American Championship results (1990–99)
- Soling North American Championship results (1990–99)
- Soling North American Championship results (2000–09)
- Soling North American Championship results (2010–19)
- Soling North American Championship results (2020–29)
