= Soling North American Championship results (2000–2009) =

Soling
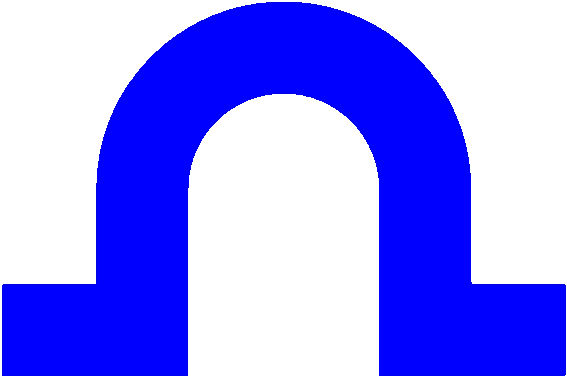

Development
- Name: Soling

== 2000 Final results ==
2000
Event title
- Edition: 32,
- Host: Severn Sailing Association

Event details
- Venue: Chesapeake Bay
- Dates: 16 – 20 Oct
- Yachts: 23
- Opening ceremony: 16 Oct

Competitors
- Competitors: 69
- Competing nations: 4

Results
- (gold) Gold: United States; Chris Larson; Karl Anderson; Dave Moffet
- (silver) Silver: Canada; Bill Abbott Jr. Goyett; Not documented
- (bronze) Bronze: United States; Jeff Gladchun; Norris; Smith

| Rank | Country | Helmsman | Crew | Sail No. | Race 1 | | Race 2 | | Race 3 | | Race 4 | | Race 5 | | Race 6 | | Race 7 | | Total | Total – discard |
| Rank | Country | Helmsman | Crew | Sail No. | Pos. | Pts. | Pos. | Pts. | Pos. | Pts. | Pos. | Pts. | Pos. | Pts. | Pos. | Pts. | Pos. | Pts. | Total | Total – discard |
| 1st place, gold medalist(s) | USA | Chris Larson | Karl Anderson; Dave Moffet | USA 848 | ~~12~~ | ~~12~~ | 1 | 1 | 3 | 3 | 1 | 1 | 3 | 3 | 4 | 4 | 6 | 6 | 30 | 18 |
| 2nd place, silver medalist(s) | CAN | Bill Abbott Jr. | Goyette; Not documented | CAN 1 | 4 | 4 | 3 | 3 | 1 | 1 | 5 | 5 | 2 | 2 | ~~8~~ | ~~8~~ | 7 | 7 | 30 | 22 |
| 3rd place, bronze medalist(s) | USA | Jeff Gladchun | Norris; Smith | USA 772 | 1 | 1 | 4 | 4 | 7 | 7 | ~~8~~ | ~~8~~ | 4 | 4 | 5 | 5 | 5 | 5 | 34 | 26 |
| 4 | USA | Stuart H. Walker | Doug Loup; Wagoner | USA 842 | ~~16~~ | ~~16~~ | 2 | 2 | 11 | 11 | 3 | 3 | 7 | 7 | 3 | 3 | 1 | 1 | 43 | 27 |
| 5 | USA | Don Cohan | Karin Olsen Campia; Buttnet | USA 835 | 2 | 2 | 8 | 8 | 6 | 6 | 6 | 6 | ~~13~~ | ~~13~~ | 12 | 12 | 2 | 2 | 49 | 36 |
| 6 | ARG | Richard Grunsten | Not documented | ARG 27 | 3 | 3 | 7 | 7 | ~~13~~ | ~~13~~ | 4 | 4 | 9 | 9 | 2 | 2 | 12 | 12 | 50 | 37 |
| 7 | USA | John Gochberg | Not documented | USA 839 | 6 | 6 | 14 | 14 | ~~17~~ | ~~17~~ | 7 | 7 | 6 | 6 | 1 | 1 | 11 | 11 | 62 | 45 |
| 8 | CAN | Mike Milner | Not documented | CAN 188 | 5 | 5 | 6 | 6 | 19 | 19 | 2 | 2 | 1 | 1 | ~~DNC~~ | ~~24~~ | 13 | 13 | 70 | 46 |
| 9 | USA | Peter Gleitz | Not documented | USA 788 | ~~11~~ | ~~11~~ | 11 | 11 | 5 | 5 | 9 | 9 | 8 | 8 | 7 | 7 | 10 | 10 | 61 | 50 |
| 10 | USA | John Ingalls | Not documented | USA 829 | 7 | 7 | 10 | 10 | 2 | 2 | 14 | 14 | ~~15~~ | ~~15~~ | 9 | 9 | 9 | 9 | 66 | 51 |
| 11 | USA | Boston | Not documented | USA 16 | 9 | 9 | 9 | 9 | ~~15~~ | ~~15~~ | 12 | 12 | 10 | 10 | 6 | 6 | 8 | 8 | 69 | 54 |
| 12 | USA | Charlie Kamps | Not documented | USA 832 | 8 | 8 | 5 | 5 | 9 | 9 | ~~16~~ | ~~16~~ | 16 | 16 | 10 | 10 | 14 | 14 | 78 | 62 |
| 13 | USA | Scott Conger | Not documented | USA 718 | 17 | 17 | 13 | 13 | 4 | 4 | ~~19~~ | ~~19~~ | 17 | 17 | 15 | 15 | 3 | 3 | 88 | 69 |
| 14 | USA | David Hoffman | Not documented | USA 780 | 10 | 10 | 20 | 20 | 12 | 12 | 10 | 10 | 5 | 5 | 4 | 4 | ~~18~~ | ~~18~~ | 79 | 59 |
| 15 | CAN | Jerry Wendt | Not documented | CAN 221 | 13 | 13 | 12 | 12 | 14 | 14 | 15 | 15 | 18 | 18 | ~~DSQ~~ | ~~24~~ | 4 | 4 | 100 | 76 |
| 16 | USA | Monteiro | Not documented | USA 216 | ~~20~~ | ~~20~~ | 17 | 17 | 10 | 10 | 11 | 11 | 11 | 11 | 16 | 16 | 15 | 15 | 100 | 80 |
| 17 | USA | Gianotti | Not documented | USA 769 | ~~OCS~~ | ~~24~~ | 15 | 15 | 8 | 8 | 13 | 13 | 14 | 14 | 13 | 13 | 19 | 19 | 106 | 82 |
| 18 | USA | Brown | Not documented | USA 781 | 15 | 15 | 16 | 16 | 20 | 20 | 20 | 20 | 12 | 12 | 11 | 11 | ~~21~~ | ~~21~~ | 115 | 94 |
| 19 | USA | Henry Thomas | Not documented | USA 799 | 19 | 19 | 18 | 18 | 21 | 21 | 17 | 17 | 21 | 21 | 17 | 17 | ~~23~~ | ~~23~~ | 136 | 113 |
| 20 | USA | Joe van Gieson | Not documented | USA 824 | 21 | 21 | ~~DNF~~ | ~~24~~ | 18 | 18 | 23 | 23 | 19 | 19 | 18 | 18 | 17 | 17 | 140 | 116 |
| 21 | USA | Keating | Not documented | USA 778 | 14 | 14 | ~~22~~ | ~~22~~ | 22 | 22 | 21 | 21 | 20 | 20 | 19 | 19 | 22 | 22 | 140 | 118 |
| 22 | ISV | John Morgan | Not documented | ISV 1 | 18 | 18 | 19 | 19 | ~~DNF~~ | ~~24~~ | 18 | 18 | DNF | 24 | DNC | 24 | 16 | 16 | 143 | 119 |
| 23 | USA | Wolff | Not documented | USA 224 | ~~OCS~~ | ~~24~~ | 21 | 21 | 16 | 16 | 22 | 22 | DNF | 24 | DNC | 24 | 20 | 20 | 151 | 127 |

Legend: DNC – Did not come to the starting area; DSQ – Disqualified; RET – Retired;
Discard is crossed out and does not count for the overall result.
Gender: – male; – female;

- 2000 Progress

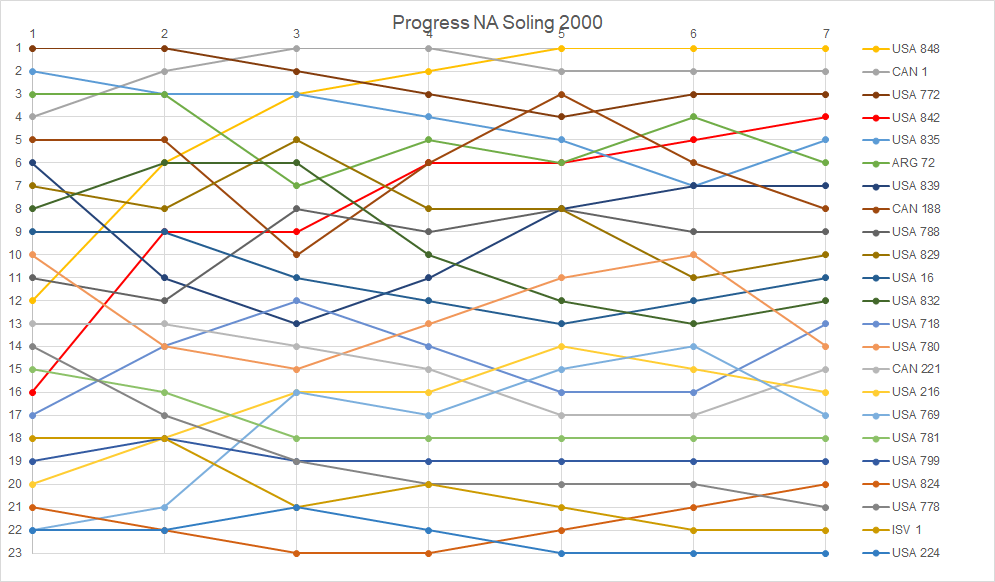

== 2001 Final results ==
No documented detailed results found yet! Victor's names found on trofee.

2001
Event title
- Edition: 33
- Host: Milwaukee Yacht Club

Event details
- Venue: Lake Michigan
- Dates: 30 Aug – 2 Sep
- Opening ceremony: 30 Aug

Results
- (gold) Gold: United States; Kent Heitzinger; Mike Tennity; Bill Santos
- (silver) Silver: Not documented
- (bronze) Bronze: Not documented

== 2002 Final results ==
2002
Event title
- Edition: 34
- Host: Wilmette Yacht Club

Event details
- Venue: Lake Michigan
- Dates: 22 -25 Aug
- Yachts: 18
- Opening ceremony: 22 Aug

Competitors
- Competitors: 54
- Competing nations: 2

Results
- (gold) Gold: United States; Jörgen Johnsson; Martin Johnsson; Mike Leslie
- (silver) Silver: United States; Charlie Kamps; Jon Bailey; Charley Tollefsen
- (bronze) Bronze: United States; Kent Heitzinger; Mike Tennity; Bill Santos

| Rank | Country | Helmsman | Crew | Sail No. | Race 1 | | Race 2 | | Race 3 | | Race 4 | | Race 5 | | Total | Total – discard |
| Rank | Country | Helmsman | Crew | Sail No. | Pos. | Pts. | Pos. | Pts. | Pos. | Pts. | Pos. | Pts. | Pos. | Pts. | Total | Total – discard |
| 1st place, gold medalist(s) | USA | Jörgen Johnsson | Martin Johnsson; Mike Leslie | USA 845 | 2 | 2 | 1 | 1 | 1 | 1 | ~~6~~ | ~~6~~ | 2 | 2 | 12 | 6 |
| 2nd place, silver medalist(s) | USA | Charlie Kamps | Jon Bailey; Charley Tollefsen | USA 832 | 1 | 1 | 4 | 4 | 4 | 4 | 5 | 5 | ~~9~~ | ~~9~~ | 23 | 14 |
| 3rd place, bronze medalist(s) | USA | Kent Heitzinger | Mike Tennity; Bill Santos | USA 825 | ~~10~~ | ~~10~~ | 2 | 2 | 3 | 3 | 8 | 8 | 4 | 4 | 27 | 17 |
| 4 | USA | Dave Williams | Fred Joosten; Beth Joosten | USA 768 | 6 | 6 | 6 | 6 | 2 | 2 | 4 | 4 | ~~12~~ | ~~12~~ | 30 | 18 |
| 5 | USA | Steve Dolan | Griffin Freysinger; Tim Roy | USA 846 | 4 | 4 | 3 | 3 | 8 | 8 | 3 | 3 | ~~11~~ | ~~11~~ | 29 | 18 |
| 6 | USA | Joe Hoeksema | Mike Wolf; Rose Hoeksema | USA 807 | 7 | 7 | 5 | 5 | 5 | 5 | 2 | 2 | ~~10~~ | ~~10~~ | 29 | 19 |
| 7 | USA | Jim Medley | Mark Hulburt; Cappy Pratt | USA 840 | 3 | 3 | 9 | 9 | ~~12~~ | ~~12~~ | 7 | 7 | 1 | 1 | 32 | 20 |
| 8 | USA | Dave Crysdale | Dan Germanotta; Jack Freysinger | USA 824 | 14 | 14 | 10 | 10 | ~~15~~ | ~~15~~ | 1 | 1 | 3 | 3 | 43 | 28 |
| 9 | USA | Ross Richards | Steve Taylor; Jerome Mathieu | USA 682 | 9 | 9 | 7 | 7 | 9 | 9 | ~~11~~ | ~~11~~ | 6 | 6 | 42 | 31 |
| 10 | USA | John Kennedy | Sal Aguinaga; Nelson Davis | USA 818 | 11 | 11 | ~~16~~ | ~~16~~ | 10 | 10 | 10 | 10 | 5 | 5 | 52 | 36 |
| 11 | ISV | John Morgan | Christopher Morgan; Kelsey Morgan | ISV 1 | ~~16~~ | ~~16~~ | 8 | 8 | 6 | 6 | 9 | 9 | 13 | 13 | 52 | 36 |
| 12 | USA | Steve Bobo | Deak Levente; Mike Shipley | USA 843 | 5 | 5 | 11 | 11 | ~~16~~ | ~~16~~ | 16 | 16 | 8 | 8 | 56 | 40 |
| 13 | USA | Tom Murphy | Bob Tropp; Tim Murphy | USA 808 | ~~17~~ | ~~17~~ | 12 | 12 | 14 | 14 | 12 | 12 | 7 | 7 | 62 | 45 |
| 14 | USA | Scott Evans | Mike Minton; Heidi Patton | USA 737 | ~~DNC~~ | ~~19~~ | 17 | 17 | 7 | 7 | 14 | 14 | 14 | 14 | 71 | 52 |
| 15 | USA | Bennet Greenwald | Michael Greenwald; Andrew O'Dwyer | USA 791 | 8 | 8 | 15 | 15 | 13 | 13 | ~~18~~ | ~~18~~ | 16 | 16 | 70 | 52 |
| 16 | USA | Jack Lane | Dave Snodgrass; Tim Malonn | USA 758 | ~~15~~ | ~~15~~ | 13 | 13 | 11 | 11 | 13 | 13 | 15 | 15 | 67 | 52 |
| 17 | USA | Dave Slaght | Mark Smith; J.P. Shipley | USA 628 | 12 | 12 | 14 | 14 | 17 | 17 | 17 | 17 | ~~DNC~~ | ~~19~~ | 79 | 60 |
| 18 | USA | Jim Buchanan | Robert Buchanan; Linda Buchanan | USA 776 | 13 | 13 | ~~18~~ | ~~18~~ | 18 | 18 | 15 | 15 | 17 | 17 | 81 | 63 |

Legend: DNC – Did not come to the starting area; DSQ – Disqualified; RET – Retired;
Discard is crossed out and does not count for the overall result.
Gender: – male; – female;

- 2002 Progress

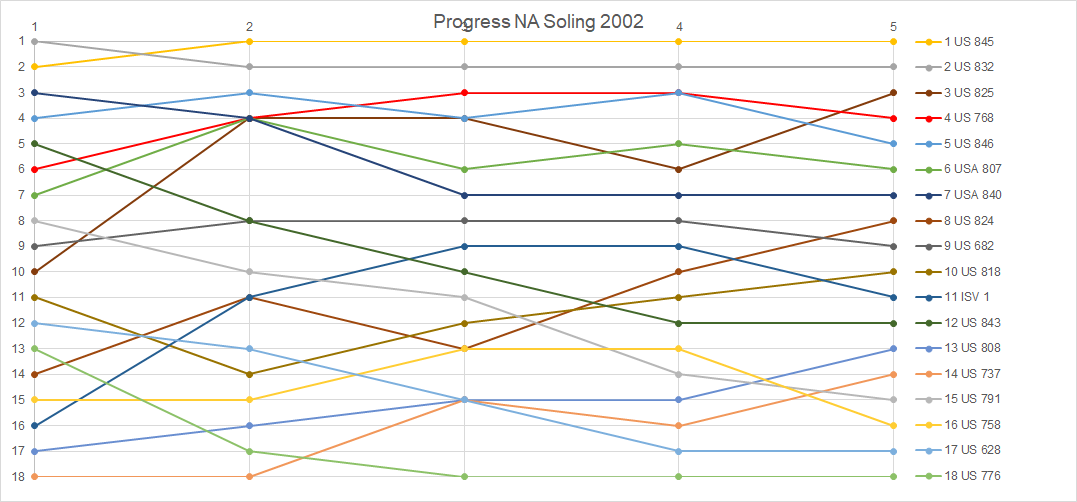

== 2003 Final results ==
2003
Event title
- Edition: 35
- Host: Milwaukee Yacht Club

Event details
- Venue: Lake Michigan
- Dates: 21 -24 Aug
- Yachts: 16
- Opening ceremony: 22 Aug

Competitors
- Competitors: 48
- Competing nations: 2

Results
- (gold) Gold: United States; Jörgen Johnsson; Martin Johnsson; Augie Hernandez
- (silver) Silver: United States; Charlie Kamps; Jon Bailey; Charley Tollefsen
- (bronze) Bronze: United States; Kent Heitzinger; Mike Tennity; Bill Santos

| Rank | Country | Helmsman | Crew | Sail No. | Race 1 | | Race 2 | | Race 3 | | Race 4 | | Race 5 | | Race 6 | | Race 7 | | Total | Total – discard |
| Rank | Country | Helmsman | Crew | Sail No. | Pos. | Pts. | Pos. | Pts. | Pos. | Pts. | Pos. | Pts. | Pos. | Pts. | Pos. | Pts. | Pos. | Pts. | Total | Total – discard |
| 1st place, gold medalist(s) | USA | Jörgen Johnsson | Martin Johnsson; Augie Hernandez | USA 845 | 2 | 2 | 1 | 1 | ~~5~~ | ~~5~~ | 1 | 1 | 3 | 3 | 2 | 2 | 4 | 4 | 18 | 13 |
| 2nd place, silver medalist(s) | USA | Joe Hoeksema | Rose Hoeksema; Mike Wolfe | USA 807 | 1 | 1 | 2 | 2 | ~~9~~ | ~~9~~ | 3 | 3 | 2 | 2 | 3 | 3 | 5 | 5 | 25 | 16 |
| 3rd place, bronze medalist(s) | USA | Charlie Kamps | Vytus Kasniunas; Len Delicea; George Petritz | USA 832 | ~~7~~ | ~~7~~ | 7 | 7 | 1 | 1 | 4 | 4 | 1 | 1 | 4 | 4 | 1 | 1 | 25 | 18 |
| 4 | USA | Kent Heitzinger | Mike Tennity; Bill Santos | USA 825 | 8 | 8 | 3 | 3 | 3 | 3 | 2 | 2 | 6 | 6 | ~~11~~ | ~~11~~ | 2 | 2 | 35 | 24 |
| 5 | USA | Jim Medley | Chris Roberts; Joe Grieser | USA 840 | 3 | 3 | ~~14~~ | ~~14~~ | 10 | 10 | 7 | 7 | 4 | 4 | 1 | 1 | 6 | 6 | 45 | 31 |
| 6 | USA | Steve Dolan | Tim Roy; Eric Roman | USA 846 | 5 | 5 | 6 | 6 | 2 | 2 | 6 | 6 | ~~10~~ | ~~10~~ | 5 | 5 | 7 | 7 | 41 | 31 |
| 7 | USA | Dave Crysdale | Gareth Smail; Gwen Kuber | USA 824 | 6 | 6 | 5 | 5 | 4 | 4 | ~~11~~ | ~~11~~ | 7 | 7 | 6 | 6 | 3 | 3 | 42 | 31 |
| 8 | USA | John Kennedy | Brendan Kennedy; Sal Aguinaga | USA 818 | ~~10~~ | ~~10~~ | 4 | 4 | 7 | 7 | 8 | 8 | 5 | 5 | 8 | 8 | 10 | 10 | 52 | 42 |
| 9 | USA | Dave Williams | Fred Joosten; Neil Heemskerk | USA 768 | 4 | 4 | 8 | 8 | 6 | 6 | 9 | 9 | ~~11~~ | ~~11~~ | 7 | 7 | 8 | 8 | 53 | 42 |
| 10 | USA | Scott Conger | Mark Rodaer; Laura Ambrose | USA 718 | 9 | 9 | 9 | 9 | ~~13~~ | ~~13~~ | 5 | 5 | 12 | 12 | 12 | 12 | 9 | 9 | 69 | 56 |
| 11 | USA | Steve Bobo | Chris Low; Heidi Patton; Sean Minton | USA 843 | 12 | 12 | 11 | 11 | 8 | 8 | 12 | 12 | 9 | 9 | ~~13~~ | ~~13~~ | 12 | 12 | 77 | 64 |
| 12 | ISV | John Morgan | Christopher Morgan; Kathy Morgan; Kelsey Morgan | ISV 1 | ~~14~~ | ~~14~~ | 12 | 12 | 11 | 11 | 13 | 13 | 8 | 8 | 10 | 10 | 11 | 11 | 79 | 65 |
| 13 | USA | Dave Baum | Bill Bresser; Kiara Caldwell | USA 639 | 11 | 11 | 10 | 10 | ~~14~~ | ~~14~~ | 14 | 14 | 13 | 13 | 9 | 9 | 13 | 13 | 84 | 70 |
| 14 | USA | Scott Evans | JP Shippley; Charlie Blumberg | USA 737 | ~~DNS~~ | ~~17~~ | 13 | 13 | 12 | 12 | 10 | 10 | 15 | 15 | 14 | 14 | DNF | 17 | 98 | 81 |
| 15 | USA | Jim Buchanan | Robert Buchanan; Linda Buchanan | USA 776 | 13 | 13 | 15 | 15 | 15 | 15 | 16 | 16 | ~~DNF~~ | ~~17~~ | DNS | 17 | DNS | 17 | 110 | 93 |
| 16 | USA | George Knipfer | Erin Watton; Neil Sobczak | USA 803 | 15 | 15 | 16 | 16 | 16 | 16 | 15 | 15 | 14 | 14 | ~~DNF~~ | ~~17~~ | DNS | 17 | 110 | 93 |

Legend: DNC – Did not come to the starting area; DSQ – Disqualified; RET – Retired;
Discard is crossed out and does not count for the overall result.
Gender: – male; – female;

- 2003 Progress

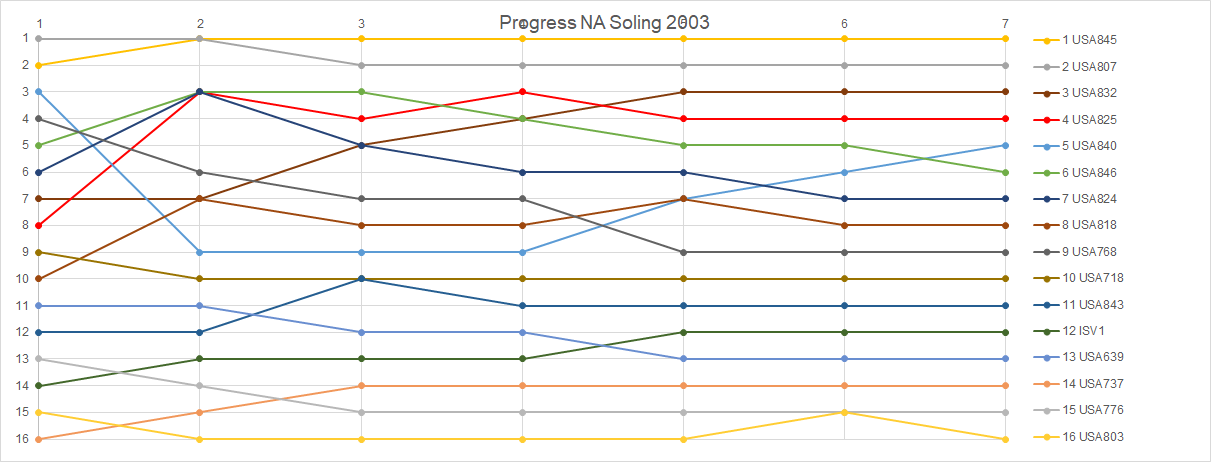

== 2004 Final results ==
2004
Event title
- Edition: 36
- Host: Valcour Sailing Club

Event details
- Venue: Lake Champlain
- Dates: 16 - 19 Sep
- Yachts: 22
- Opening ceremony: 16 Sep

Competitors
- Competitors: 66
- Competing nations: 2

Results
- (gold) Gold: Canada; Bill Abbott Jr. Jim Turvey; Sarah Tucker
- (silver) Silver: United States; Peter Galloway; Greg Anthony; Paul Steinborn
- (bronze) Bronze: United States; Stuart H. Walker; Chris Brown; Bruce Empey

| Rank | Country | Helmsman | Crew | Sail No. | Race 1 | | Race 2 | | Race 3 | | Race 4 | | Race 5 | | Race 6 | | Race 7 | | Total | Total – discard |
| Rank | Country | Helmsman | Crew | Sail No. | Pos. | Pts. | Pos. | Pts. | Pos. | Pts. | Pos. | Pts. | Pos. | Pts. | Pos. | Pts. | Pos. | Pts. | Total | Total – discard |
| 1st place, gold medalist(s) | CAN | Bill Abbott Jr. | Jim Turvey; Sarah Tucker | CAN 1 | 2 | 2 | 3 | 3 | 1 | 1 | 5 | 5 | 1 | 1 | ~~5~~ | ~~5~~ | 2 | 2 | 19 | 14 |
| 2nd place, silver medalist(s) | USA | Peter Galloway | Greg Anthony; Paul Steinborn | USA 831 | 8 | 8 | 1 | 1 | 3 | 3 | 1 | 1 | ~~DNF~~ | ~~23~~ | 3 | 3 | 5 | 5 | 44 | 21 |
| 3rd place, bronze medalist(s) | USA | Stuart H. Walker | Chris Brown; Bruce Empey | USA 842 | ~~6~~ | ~~6~~ | 6 | 6 | 2 | 2 | 4 | 4 | 2 | 2 | 4 | 4 | 3 | 3 | 27 | 21 |
| 4 | CAN | Peter Hall | Mike Parsons; Philip Kerrigan | CAN 197 | 1 | 1 | 2 | 2 | 5 | 5 | ~~7~~ | ~~7~~ | 6 | 6 | 2 | 2 | 6 | 6 | 29 | 22 |
| 5 | USA | Dave Franzel | Dave Carlson; Erik Mikisch | USA 780 | 3 | 3 | 7 | 7 | ~~9~~ | ~~9~~ | 2 | 2 | 3 | 3 | 1 | 1 | 7 | 7 | 32 | 23 |
| 6 | USA | Charles Kamps | Toby Kamps; Vytas Kasniunas | USA 832 | 4 | 4 | 5 | 5 | 4 | 4 | 3 | 3 | 5 | 5 | ~~8~~ | ~~8~~ | 4 | 4 | 33 | 25 |
| 7 | USA | Steve Dolan | Jack Freysinger; Jon Bailey | USA 846 | 7 | 7 | 8 | 8 | 8 | 8 | 6 | 6 | 10 | 10 | ~~12~~ | ~~12~~ | 1 | 1 | 52 | 40 |
| 8 | USA | Dave Gorman | Don Brush; Kurt Kling | USA 714 | 5 | 5 | 9 | 9 | 7 | 7 | 9 | 9 | 8 | 8 | 6 | 6 | ~~13~~ | ~~13~~ | 57 | 44 |
| 9 | USA | Chris Duley | Roland Sherman; Brian Dowling | USA 850 | 10 | 10 | 4 | 4 | 6 | 6 | ~~15~~ | ~~15~~ | 9 | 9 | 13 | 13 | 11 | 11 | 68 | 53 |
| 10 | USA | Ed Trombley | Phil Gorman; Jordy Von Elbe | USA 833 | 9 | 9 | 10 | 10 | ~~17~~ | ~~17~~ | 11 | 11 | 4 | 4 | 16 | 16 | 9 | 9 | 76 | 59 |
| 11 | CAN | Tom Mitchell | Eric MacKnight; Ken Davy | CAN 227 | ~~17~~ | ~~17~~ | 12 | 12 | 13 | 13 | 8 | 8 | 14 | 14 | 9 | 9 | 17 | 17 | 90 | 73 |
| 12 | USA | Steve Bobo | Brendan Kennedy; Kiara Caldwell | USA 843 | 15 | 15 | ~~17~~ | ~~17~~ | 14 | 14 | 14 | 14 | 7 | 7 | 10 | 10 | 14 | 14 | 91 | 74 |
| 13 | USA | John Trombley | Chris Lanigan; Shirley Tedford | USA 849 | ~~18~~ | ~~18~~ | 13 | 13 | 20 | 20 | 13 | 13 | 11 | 11 | 7 | 7 | 12 | 12 | 94 | 74 |
| 14 | USA | Ty Kretser | Andy Sajor; Amy Jordan | USA 811 | 12 | 12 | ~~DNF~~ | ~~23~~ | 21 | 21 | 10 | 10 | 17 | 17 | 15 | 15 | 8 | 8 | 106 | 83 |
| 15 | CAN | Ted Richards | Ian Watson; Gord Devries | CAN 198 | 13 | 13 | ~~16~~ | ~~16~~ | 16 | 16 | 12 | 12 | 15 | 15 | 14 | 14 | 15 | 15 | 101 | 85 |
| 16 | USA | Pat Larkin | Kevin Larkin; Brian Larkin | USA 851 | 11 | 11 | 11 | 11 | 18 | 18 | 20 | 20 | ~~DNF~~ | ~~23~~ | 11 | 11 | 20 | 20 | 114 | 91 |
| 17 | USA | Scott Richardson | Bill McKluskey; Gwen Queginneur | USA 820 | 14 | 14 | ~~20~~ | ~~20~~ | 11 | 11 | 17 | 17 | 13 | 13 | 20 | 20 | 16 | 16 | 111 | 91 |
| 18 | USA | Dan Inhelder | Caroline Baker; John Pytlak | USA 755 | 16 | 16 | 15 | 15 | 15 | 15 | 16 | 16 | 12 | 12 | ~~21~~ | ~~21~~ | 18 | 18 | 113 | 92 |
| 19 | USA | Tom Morley | Steve Pytlak; Chris Diener | USA 761 | 19 | 19 | 18 | 18 | 12 | 12 | ~~21~~ | ~~21~~ | 18 | 18 | 18 | 18 | 10 | 10 | 116 | 95 |
| 20 | USA | Brian White | Dave Sciole; Tim McCormick | USA 85 | ~~20~~ | ~~20~~ | 14 | 14 | 10 | 10 | 19 | 19 | 16 | 16 | 19 | 19 | 19 | 19 | 117 | 97 |
| 21 | USA | Joe Van Gieson | B. Buckhart; Adam Goldstein | USA 717 | 21 | 21 | 19 | 19 | 19 | 19 | 18 | 18 | 19 | 19 | 17 | 17 | ~~DNF~~ | ~~23~~ | 136 | 113 |
| 22 | USA | Guy Hausrath | Ann Larkin; Judy Murphy | USA 719 | ~~DNF~~ | ~~23~~ | DNS | 23 | 22 | 22 | 22 | 22 | 20 | 20 | 22 | 22 | 21 | 21 | 153 | 130 |

Legend: DNC – Did not come to the starting area; DSQ – Disqualified; RET – Retired;
Discard is crossed out and does not count for the overall result.
Gender: – male; – female;

- 2004 Progress

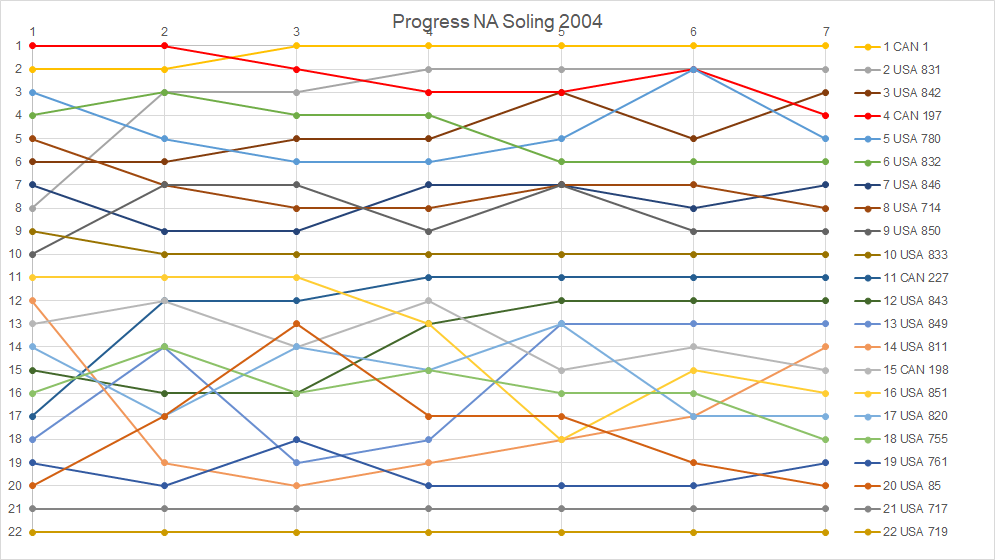

== 2005 Final results ==
2005
Event title
- Edition: 37
- Host: Etobicoke Yacht Club

Event details
- Venue: Lake Ontario
- Dates: 16 - 18 Oct
- Yachts: 17
- Opening ceremony: 16 Oct

Competitors
- Competitors: 51
- Competing nations: 3

Results
- (gold) Gold: Canada; Bill Abbott Jr. Joanne Abbott; Brad Boston
- (silver) Silver: Canada; Hans Fogh; Roger Cheer; John Kerr
- (bronze) Bronze: Canada; Bruce Clifford; Chris Tattersall; Matt Abbott

| Rank | Country | Helmsman | Crew | Sail No. | Race 1 | | Race 2 | | Race 3 | | Race 4 | | Race 5 | | Race 6 | | Race 7 | | Total | Total – discard |
| Rank | Country | Helmsman | Crew | Sail No. | Pos. | Pts. | Pos. | Pts. | Pos. | Pts. | Pos. | Pts. | Pos. | Pts. | Pos. | Pts. | Pos. | Pts. | Total | Total – discard |
| 1st place, gold medalist(s) | CAN | Bill Abbott Jr. | Joanne Abbott; Brad Boston | CAN 1 | 1 | 1 | 1 | 1 | 1 | 1 | 3 | 3 | 1 | 1 | 3 | 3 | ~~DNS~~ | ~~18~~ | 28 | 10 |
| 2nd place, silver medalist(s) | CAN | Hans Fogh | Roger Cheer; John Kerr | CAN 230 | 2 | 2 | 2 | 2 | ~~7~~ | ~~7~~ | 1 | 1 | 5 | 5 | 6 | 6 | 2 | 2 | 25 | 18 |
| 3rd place, bronze medalist(s) | CAN | Bruce Clifford | Chris Tattersall; Matt Abbott | CAN 212 | 3 | 3 | 5 | 5 | 2 | 2 | ~~8~~ | ~~8~~ | 3 | 3 | 2 | 2 | 4 | 4 | 27 | 19 |
| 4 | CAN | Peter Hall | Phillip Kerrigan; Mike Parsons | CAN 197 | 4 | 4 | ~~6~~ | ~~6~~ | 5 | 5 | 5 | 5 | 6 | 6 | 1 | 1 | 5 | 5 | 32 | 26 |
| 5 | USA | Charlie Kamps | Johann Offermans; Vytas Kasniunas | USA 832 | ~~13~~ | ~~13~~ | 4 | 4 | 3 | 3 | 6 | 6 | 4 | 4 | 5 | 5 | 6 | 6 | 41 | 28 |
| 6 | USA | Stuart H. Walker | Dave Loup; Owen Empey | USA 842 | 5 | 5 | 9 | 9 | 8 | 8 | ~~10~~ | ~~10~~ | 2 | 2 | 7 | 7 | 3 | 3 | 44 | 34 |
| 7 | USA | Steve Dolan | John Bailey; Jack Freysinger | USA 846 | 7 | 7 | 7 | 7 | 10 | 10 | ~~11~~ | ~~11~~ | 7 | 7 | 8 | 8 | 7 | 7 | 57 | 46 |
| 8 | CAN | Tom Mitchell | Dave Richards; Robin Earle | CAN 227 | 6 | 6 | ~~16~~ | ~~16~~ | 6 | 6 | 4 | 4 | 9 | 9 | 9 | 9 | 14 | 14 | 64 | 48 |
| 9 | CAN | Rick Huczek | Dave Hymers; Will Logar | CAN 17 | ~~15~~ | ~~15~~ | 3 | 3 | 9 | 9 | 12 | 12 | 14 | 14 | 10 | 10 | 1 | 1 | 64 | 49 |
| 10 | CAN | Edward Richards | Gord Devries; Ian Watson | CAN 228 | 8 | 8 | 15 | 15 | 11 | 11 | 2 | 2 | 8 | 8 | 15 | 15 | ~~16~~ | ~~16~~ | 75 | 59 |
| 11 | CAN | Scot Mundle | C.Mundle; B. White; N. Kaars-Sijpesteijn | CAN 218 | ~~14~~ | ~~14~~ | 11 | 11 | 4 | 4 | 7 | 7 | 13 | 13 | 14 | 14 | 11 | 11 | 74 | 60 |
| 12 | USA | Chris Duley | Brian Dowling; Roland Sherman | USA 850 | 12 | 12 | 8 | 8 | 13 | 13 | ~~14~~ | ~~14~~ | 11 | 11 | 11 | 11 | 8 | 8 | 77 | 63 |
| 13 | USA | Ross Richards | Jakob Hiller; Alex Mitchell | USA 682 | 10 | 10 | 12 | 12 | ~~14~~ | ~~14~~ | 9 | 9 | 16 | 16 | 13 | 13 | 10 | 10 | 84 | 68 |
| 14 | CAN | Paul Bryan | Brendan Shadford; S. Faller; Ken Davy | CAN 221 | 9 | 9 | 10 | 10 | 15 | 15 | 16 | 16 | 10 | 10 | ~~17~~ | ~~17~~ | 12 | 12 | 89 | 72 |
| 15 | USA | Stephen Bobo | Jerome Mathieu; Kiara Cladwell | USA 843 | 16 | 16 | 13 | 13 | 12 | 12 | 13 | 13 | ~~17~~ | ~~17~~ | 4 | 4 | 15 | 15 | 90 | 73 |
| 16 | ISV | John Morgan | Blair Armstrong; Chris Morgan | ISV 1 | 11 | 11 | 14 | 14 | ~~16~~ | ~~16~~ | 15 | 15 | 12 | 12 | 12 | 12 | 9 | 9 | 89 | 73 |
| 17 | USA | Joe Shipley | J.P. Shipley; Not documented | USA 697 | ~~17~~ | ~~17~~ | 17 | 17 | 17 | 17 | 17 | 17 | 15 | 15 | 16 | 16 | 13 | 13 | 112 | 95 |

Legend: DNC – Did not come to the starting area; DSQ – Disqualified; RET – Retired;
Discard is crossed out and does not count for the overall result.
Gender: – male; – female;

- 2005 Progress

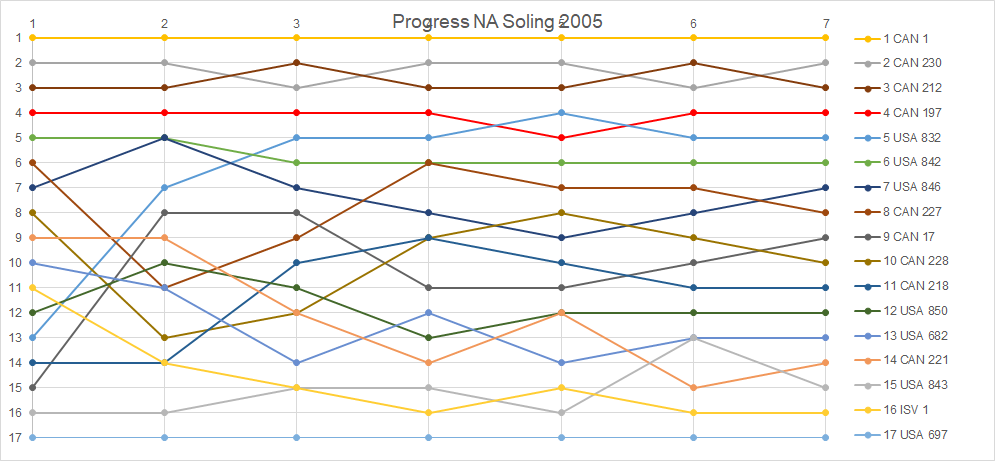

== 2006 Final results ==
2006
Event title
- Edition: 38,
- Host: Milwaukee Yacht Club

Event details
- Venue: Lake Michigan
- Dates: 13 – 16 Jul
- Yachts: 15
- Opening ceremony: 13 Jul

Competitors
- Competitors: 45
- Competing nations: 1

Results
- (gold) Gold: United States; Jörgen Johnsson; Martin Johnsson; Augi Hernandez
- (silver) Silver: United States; Jim Medley; Marc Hulburt; Chris Roberts
- (bronze) Bronze: United States; Charlie Kamps; Vytas Kasniunas; Jon Bailey

| Rank | Country | Helmsman | Crew | Sail No. | Race 1 | | Race 2 | | Race 3 | | Race 4 | | Total |
| Rank | Country | Helmsman | Crew | Sail No. | Pos. | Pts. | Pos. | Pts. | Pos. | Pts. | Pos. | Pts. | Total |
| 1st place, gold medalist(s) | USA | Jörgen Johnsson | Martin Johnsson; Augi Hernandez | USA 845 | 1 | 1 | 1 | 1 | 4 | 4 | 3 | 3 | 9 |
| 2nd place, silver medalist(s) | USA | Jim Medley | Marc Hulburt; Chris Roberts | USA 840 | 3 | 3 | 5 | 5 | 5 | 5 | 1 | 1 | 14 |
| 3rd place, bronze medalist(s) | USA | Charlie Kamps | Vytas Kasniunas; Jon Bailey | USA 832 | 6 | 6 | 4 | 4 | 2 | 2 | 2 | 2 | 14 |
| 4 | USA | Jamie Hummert | Mike Shoendorf; Rob Hammil | USA 790 | 4 | 4 | 2 | 2 | 3 | 3 | 8 | 8 | 17 |
| 5 | USA | Scott Conger | Mark Rodaer; Greg Conger | USA 718 | 2 | 2 | 9 | 9 | 8 | 8 | 4 | 4 | 23 |
| 6 | USA | John Kennedy | Sam Boyer; Brendan Kennedy | USA 818 | 11 | 11 | 3 | 3 | 1 | 1 | 9 | 9 | 24 |
| 7 | USA | Joe Hoeksema | Matias Collins; Rose Hoeksema | USA 807 | 5 | 5 | 8 | 8 | 7 | 7 | 5 | 5 | 25 |
| 8 | USA | Steve Dolan | Eric Roman; Scott Stroud | USA 846 | 8 | 8 | 7 | 7 | 6 | 6 | 6 | 6 | 27 |
| 9 | USA | Steve Bobo | Dagmar Van Engen; Emily Gensheimer | USA 843 | 10 | 10 | 6 | 6 | OCS | 16 | 7 | 7 | 39 |
| 10 | USA | David Baum | Margaret Chavez; Kiara Caldwell | USA 639 | 7 | 7 | 10 | 10 | OCS | 16 | 10 | 10 | 43 |
| 11 | USA | Scott Evans | Johnnathan Dellinger; Daniel Morris | USA 737 | 9 | 9 | 13 | 13 | 10 | 10 | 12 | 12 | 44 |
| 12 | USA | Marty McKenna | Mike Minton; Dave Rearick | USA 610 | DNC | 16 | 12 | 12 | 11 | 11 | 11 | 11 | 50 |
| 13 | USA | Dick Kinney | John Gieske; Chris Orkey | USA 601 | DNS | 16 | 11 | 11 | 9 | 9 | DNC | 16 | 52 |
| 14 | USA | Joe Shipley | J.P. Shipley; Willie Rozanski | USA 697 | 14 | 14 | 14 | 14 | 12 | 12 | 13 | 13 | 53 |
| 15 | USA | Tina Stueve | Dianne Dagelen; Not documented | USA 700 | DNC | 16 | DNC | 16 | DNC | 16 | DNC | 16 | 64 |

Legend: DNC – Did not come to the starting area; DSQ – Disqualified; RET – Retired;
Discard is crossed out and does not count for the overall result.
Gender: – male; – female;

- 2006 Progress

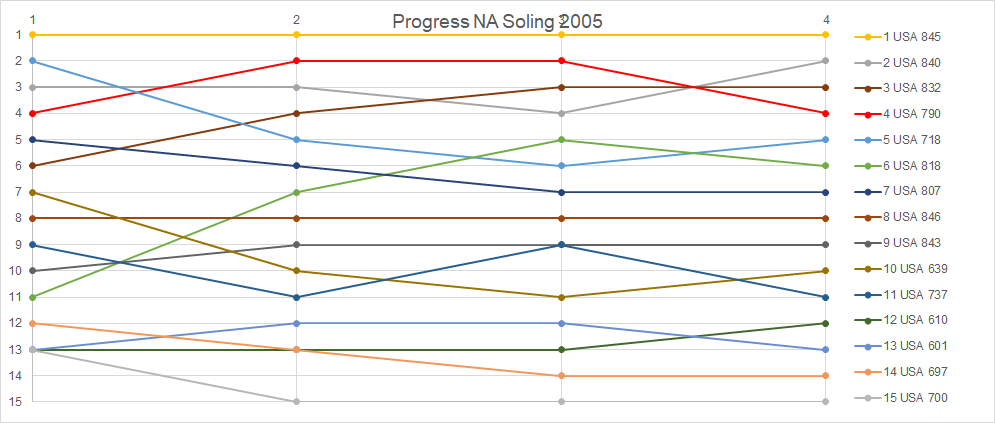

== 2007 Final results ==
2007
Event title
- Edition: 39
- Host: Wilmette Yacht Club

Event details
- Venue: Lake Michigan
- Dates: 13 – 16 Jul
- Yachts: 19
- Opening ceremony: 13 Jul

Competitors
- Competitors: 57
- Competing nations: 4

Results
- (gold) Gold: Canada; Hans Fogh; Roger Cheer; Gord Devries
- (silver) Silver: United States; Jörgen Johnsson; Martin Johnsson; Augi Hernandez
- (bronze) Bronze: United States; Peter Hall; Mike Parsons; Jamie Allan

| Rank | Country | Helmsman | Crew | Sail No. | Race 1 | | Race 2 | | Race 3 | | Race 4 | | Race 5 | | Race 6 | | Race 7 | | Total | Total – discard |
| Rank | Country | Helmsman | Crew | Sail No. | Pos. | Pts. | Pos. | Pts. | Pos. | Pts. | Pos. | Pts. | Pos. | Pts. | Pos. | Pts. | Pos. | Pts. | Total | Total – discard |
| 1st place, gold medalist(s) | CAN | Hans Fogh | Roger Cheer; Gord Devries | CAN 230 | 3 | 3 | 3 | 3 | 2 | 2 | 1 | 1 | 2 | 2 | 2 | 2 | ~~DNS~~ | ~~20~~ | 33 | 13 |
| 2nd place, silver medalist(s) | USA | Jörgen Johnsson | Martin Johnsson; Augi Hernandez | USA 845 | ~~5~~ | ~~5~~ | 1 | 1 | 4 | 4 | 2 | 2 | 4 | 4 | 5 | 5 | 3 | 3 | 24 | 19 |
| 3rd place, bronze medalist(s) | CAN | Peter Hall | Mike Parsons; Jamie Allan | CAN 225 | ~~8~~ | ~~8~~ | 2 | 2 | 7 | 7 | 5 | 5 | 3 | 3 | 3 | 3 | 2 | 2 | 30 | 22 |
| 4 | USA | Charlie Kamps | Jack Freysinger; Hans Meyer | USA 832 | 1 | 1 | 4 | 4 | 3 | 3 | 7 | 7 | 7 | 7 | ~~13~~ | ~~13~~ | 5 | 5 | 40 | 27 |
| 5 | USA | Dave Crysdale | Hays Formella; Willy Rozanski | USA 824 | 4 | 4 | ~~11~~ | ~~11~~ | 1 | 1 | 8 | 8 | 6 | 6 | 7 | 7 | 8 | 8 | 45 | 34 |
| 6 | GER | Roman Koch | Maxl Koch; Thomas Scherer | GER 300 | 10 | 10 | 6 | 6 | 11 | 11 | ~~OCS~~ | ~~20~~ | 1 | 1 | 1 | 1 | 6 | 6 | 55 | 35 |
| 7 | USA | Steve Dolan | Lucas Hiller; Charlie Tollefson | USA 846 | ~~11~~ | ~~11~~ | 9 | 9 | 6 | 6 | 3 | 3 | 8 | 8 | 8 | 8 | 4 | 4 | 49 | 38 |
| 8 | USA | Matias Collins | Eric Brown; Scott Evans | USA 807 | 9 | 9 | 10 | 10 | 5 | 5 | 9 | 9 | ~~11~~ | ~~11~~ | 10 | 10 | 1 | 1 | 55 | 44 |
| 9 | USA | Scott Conger | Mark Rodaer; Greg Conger | USA 718 | 2 | 2 | 7 | 7 | ~~15~~ | ~~15~~ | 12 | 12 | 12 | 12 | 9 | 9 | 7 | 7 | 64 | 49 |
| 10 | USA | Stuart H. Walker | Doug Loup; Bruce Empey | USA 839 | ~~15~~ | ~~15~~ | 13 | 13 | 9 | 9 | 4 | 4 | 9 | 9 | 6 | 6 | 9 | 9 | 65 | 50 |
| 11 | USA | Stephen Bobo | Jerome Mathieu; Emily Gensheimer | USA 843 | 14 | 14 | 12 | 12 | 14 | 14 | 6 | 6 | 5 | 5 | 4 | 4 | ~~16~~ | ~~16~~ | 71 | 55 |
| 12 | USA | Ross Richards | Patrick Richards; Jakob Hiller | USA 682 | 7 | 7 | 5 | 5 | 12 | 12 | 10 | 10 | 14 | 14 | 14 | 14 | ~~DNS~~ | ~~20~~ | 82 | 62 |
| 13 | ISV | John Morgan | Kathy Morgan; Christopher Morgan | ISV 1 | 6 | 6 | 15 | 15 | 8 | 8 | 15 | 15 | 15 | 15 | ~~17~~ | ~~17~~ | 13 | 13 | 89 | 72 |
| 14 | USA | John Kennedy | Brendan Kennedy; Anna Kenedy | USA 818 | 12 | 12 | ~~17~~ | ~~17~~ | 16 | 16 | 14 | 14 | 10 | 10 | 11 | 11 | 12 | 12 | 92 | 75 |
| 15 | USA | Joseph Van Gieson | Bruce Buckheit; Chris Foscue | USA 828 | 13 | 13 | 14 | 14 | 10 | 10 | ~~OCS~~ | ~~20~~ | 13 | 13 | 12 | 12 | 14 | 14 | 96 | 76 |
| 16 | CAN | Tom Mitchell | Rob Redden; Adam Nowina | CAN 227 | 16 | 16 | 8 | 8 | 13 | 13 | 11 | 11 | ~~16~~ | ~~16~~ | 15 | 15 | 17 | 17 | 96 | 79 |
| 17 | USA | Tom Elliott | Elliot; Joe Copak | USA 768 | 17 | 17 | 16 | 16 | ~~19~~ | ~~19~~ | 13 | 13 | 17 | 17 | 18 | 18 | 11 | 11 | 111 | 92 |
| 18 | USA | Robert Buchanan | Greg Cook; Jim Buchanan | USA 776 | ~~19~~ | ~~19~~ | 18 | 18 | 18 | 18 | 16 | 16 | 18 | 18 | 16 | 16 | 10 | 10 | 115 | 96 |
| 19 | USA | Joe Shipley | James Shipley; John Gierke | USA 697 | 18 | 18 | ~~19~~ | ~~19~~ | 17 | 17 | 17 | 17 | 19 | 19 | 19 | 19 | 15 | 15 | 124 | 105 |

Legend: DNC – Did not come to the starting area; DSQ – Disqualified; RET – Retired;
Discard is crossed out and does not count for the overall result.
Gender: – male; – female;

- 2007 Progress

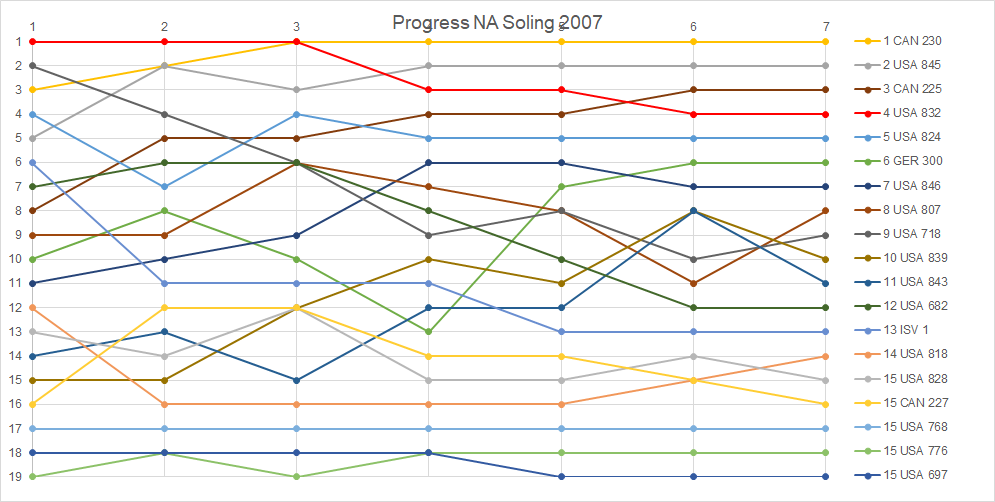

== 2008 Final results ==
2008
Event title
- Edition: 40
- Host: Etobicoke Yacht Club

Event details
- Venue: Lake Ontario
- Dates: 19 – 22 Jun
- Yachts: 15
- Opening ceremony: 19 Jun

Competitors
- Competitors: 45
- Competing nations: 2

Results
- (gold) Gold: Canada; Hans Fogh; Roger Cheer; Gord Devries
- (silver) Silver: Canada; Peter Hall; Philip Kerrigan; T. Park
- (bronze) Bronze: Canada; Ken Brown; M. Bird; S. Jones

| Rank | Country | Helmsman | Crew | Sail No. | Race 1 | | Race 2 | | Race 3 | | Race 4 | | Race 5 | | Race 6 | | Total | Total – discard |
| Rank | Country | Helmsman | Crew | Sail No. | Pos. | Pts. | Pos. | Pts. | Pos. | Pts. | Pos. | Pts. | Pos. | Pts. | Pos. | Pts. | Total | Total – discard |
| 1st place, gold medalist(s) | CAN | Hans Fogh | Roger Cheer; Gord Devries | CAN 230 | 2 | 2 | 1 | 1 | ~~5~~ | ~~5~~ | 3 | 3 | 3 | 3 | 3 | 3 | 17 | 12 |
| 2nd place, silver medalist(s) | CAN | Peter Hall | Philip Kerrigan; T. Park | CAN 225 | 5 | 5 | ~~OCS~~ | ~~16~~ | 4 | 4 | 1 | 1 | 4 | 4 | 1 | 1 | 31 | 15 |
| 3rd place, bronze medalist(s) | CAN | Ken Brown | M. Bird; S. Jones | CAN 211 | 4 | 4 | 2 | 2 | 2 | 2 | 5 | 5 | ~~13~~ | ~~13~~ | 2 | 2 | 28 | 15 |
| 4 | USA | Stuart H. Walker | Doug Loup; Bruce Empey | USA 839 | 1 | 1 | 3 | 3 | 6 | 6 | 2 | 2 | ~~7~~ | ~~7~~ | 6 | 6 | 25 | 18 |
| 5 | USA | Charlie Kamps | Toby Kamps; D. Richards | USA 832 | 6 | 6 | 5 | 5 | 3 | 3 | 4 | 4 | ~~10~~ | ~~10~~ | 4 | 4 | 32 | 22 |
| 6 | USA | John Kennedy | A. Wien; B. White | USA 818 | ~~12~~ | ~~12~~ | 8 | 8 | 1 | 1 | 7 | 7 | 9 | 9 | 9 | 9 | 46 | 34 |
| 7 | USA | Henry Thomas | A. Dize; T. Boggs | USA 799 | 7 | 7 | 10 | 10 | 8 | 8 | 8 | 8 | 2 | 2 | ~~OCS~~ | ~~16~~ | 51 | 35 |
| 8 | USA | Dave Crysdale | S. Eisenhardt; G. Smail | USA 824 | 3 | 3 | 9 | 9 | ~~14~~ | ~~14~~ | 9 | 9 | 6 | 6 | 8 | 8 | 49 | 35 |
| 9 | USA | Chris Duley | R. Sherman; S. Stata | USA 835 | 8 | 8 | 4 | 4 | ~~11~~ | ~~11~~ | 11 | 11 | 5 | 5 | 7 | 7 | 46 | 35 |
| 10 | USA | Steve Bobo | T. Lerenzi; J. Costakis | USA 843 | 10 | 10 | 6 | 6 | 9 | 9 | ~~14~~ | ~~14~~ | 11 | 11 | 5 | 5 | 55 | 41 |
| 11 | CAN | Tom Mitchell | J. Podgorski l. Raggahello | CAN 227 | 9 | 9 | 7 | 7 | ~~13~~ | ~~13~~ | 6 | 6 | 8 | 8 | 11 | 11 | 54 | 41 |
| 12 | CAN | Ken Davy | E. Nowina; C. Poitras | CAN 210 | 14 | 14 | 11 | 11 | 10 | 10 | 15 | 15 | 1 | 1 | ~~OCS~~ | ~~16~~ | 67 | 51 |
| 13 | CAN | Manfred Kanter | Tom Freeman; B. Dully | CAN 226 | 11 | 11 | ~~13~~ | ~~13~~ | 7 | 7 | 12 | 12 | 12 | 12 | 10 | 10 | 65 | 52 |
| 14 | CAN | Paul Bryan | N. Dubyk; A. Mooney | CAN 221 | ~~15~~ | ~~15~~ | 14 | 14 | 12 | 12 | 10 | 10 | 14 | 14 | 13 | 13 | 78 | 63 |
| 15 | CAN | Larry Votary | J. Gasiorowski; R. Earle | CAN 198 | 13 | 13 | 12 | 12 | ~~15~~ | ~~15~~ | 13 | 13 | 15 | 15 | 12 | 12 | 80 | 65 |

Legend: DNC – Did not come to the starting area; DSQ – Disqualified; RET – Retired;
Discard is crossed out and does not count for the overall result.
Gender: – male; – female;

- 2008 Progress

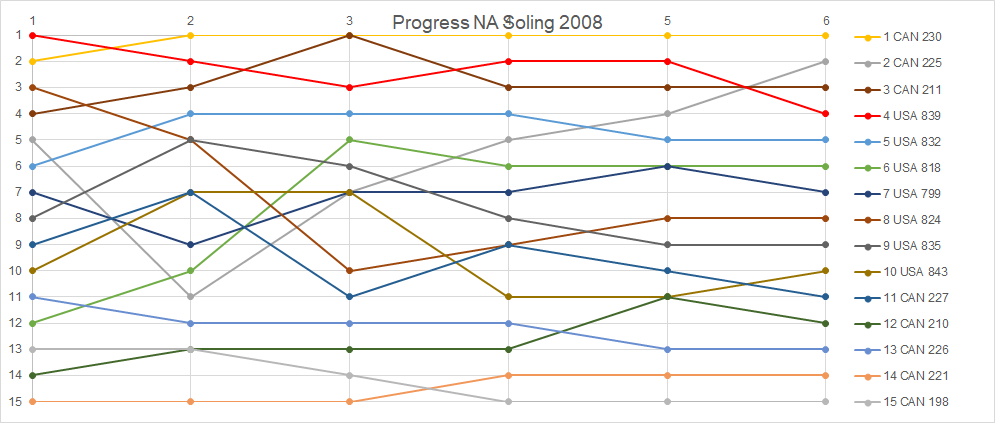

== 2009 Final results ==
2009
Event title
- Edition: 41
- Host: Valcour Sailing Club

Event details
- Venue: Lake Champlain
- Dates: 14 – 16 Aug
- Yachts: 16
- Opening ceremony: 14 Aug

Competitors
- Competitors: 48
- Competing nations: 2

Results
- (gold) Gold: Canada; Peter Hall; Philip Kerrigan; Gavin Flynn
- (silver) Silver: Canada; Hans Fogh; Roger Cheer; Gord Devries
- (bronze) Bronze: United States; Stuart H. Walker; Bruce Empey; Doug Loup

| Rank | Country | Helmsman | Crew | Sail No. | Race 1 | | Race 2 | | Race 3 | | Race 4 | | Race 5 | | Race 6 | | Race 7 | | Total | Total – discard |
| Rank | Country | Helmsman | Crew | Sail No. | Pos. | Pts. | Pos. | Pts. | Pos. | Pts. | Pos. | Pts. | Pos. | Pts. | Pos. | Pts. | Pos. | Pts. | Total | Total – discard |
| 1st place, gold medalist(s) | CAN | Peter Hall | Philip Kerrigan; Gavin Flynn | CAN 225 | 2 | 2 | 3 | 3 | 2 | 2 | ~~4~~ | ~~4~~ | 2 | 2 | 2 | 2 | 1 | 1 | 16 | 12 |
| 2nd place, silver medalist(s) | CAN | Hans Fogh | Roger Cheer; Gord Devries | CAN 230 | 1 | 1 | 2 | 2 | 1 | 1 | 1 | 1 | ~~7~~ | ~~7~~ | 6 | 6 | 2 | 2 | 20 | 13 |
| 3rd place, bronze medalist(s) | USA | Stuart H. Walker | Bruce Empey; Doug Loup | USA 839 | 4 | 4 | 1 | 1 | ~~6~~ | ~~6~~ | 2 | 2 | 1 | 1 | 5 | 5 | 6 | 6 | 25 | 19 |
| 4 | USA | Don Brush | Ray Harrington; Brian Dowling | USA 850 | 3 | 3 | 4 | 4 | ~~10~~ | ~~10~~ | 3 | 3 | 3 | 3 | 10 | 10 | 3 | 3 | 36 | 26 |
| 5 | CAN | Ken Davy | Dave Hymers; Eric Nowina | CAN 210 | 5 | 5 | 6 | 6 | 5 | 5 | ~~9~~ | ~~9~~ | 5 | 5 | 1 | 1 | 7 | 7 | 38 | 29 |
| 6 | USA | Ed Trombley | John Trombley; Andy Sajor | USA 833 | 6 | 6 | 5 | 5 | 3 | 3 | 6 | 6 | 9 | 9 | ~~11~~ | ~~11~~ | 11 | 11 | 51 | 40 |
| 7 | USA | Brian White | Bruce Gugliotta; Brad Dumas | USA 780 | 10 | 10 | 8 | 8 | 7 | 7 | 5 | 5 | ~~14~~ | ~~14~~ | 4 | 4 | 8 | 8 | 56 | 42 |
| 8 | CAN | Manfred Kanter | Tom Freeman; Blair Tully | CAN 226 | 8 | 8 | 7 | 7 | 9 | 9 | 7 | 7 | 8 | 8 | ~~13~~ | ~~13~~ | 5 | 5 | 57 | 44 |
| 9 | USA | Dave Crysdale | Hays Formella; Andrew Brill | USA 824 | 9 | 9 | 11 | 11 | ~~15~~ | ~~15~~ | 10 | 10 | 4 | 4 | 8 | 8 | 4 | 4 | 61 | 46 |
| 10 | USA | Ross Richards | Amanda Richard; Lucas Hiller | USA 816 | 13 | 13 | ~~14~~ | ~~14~~ | 4 | 4 | 14 | 14 | 10 | 10 | 7 | 7 | 12 | 12 | 74 | 60 |
| 11 | USA | John Kennedy | Sal Aguinaga; Geet Sharma | USA 818 | 12 | 12 | 15 | 15 | 8 | 8 | 11 | 11 | ~~OCS~~ | ~~17~~ | 3 | 3 | 14 | 14 | 80 | 63 |
| 12 | USA | Roland Sherman | Laurie Gogliotta; Mark Stata | USA 835 | ~~DNF~~ | ~~17~~ | DNF | 17 | DNS | 17 | 8 | 8 | 6 | 6 | 9 | 9 | 10 | 10 | 84 | 67 |
| 13 | CAN | Tom Mitchell | Louis Raffaghello; Jan Podgorski | CAN 227 | 11 | 11 | 10 | 10 | 13 | 13 | 12 | 12 | 12 | 12 | ~~15~~ | ~~15~~ | 9 | 9 | 82 | 67 |
| 14 | USA | Steve Bobo | Jerome Mathieu; Joe Teno | USA 843 | 7 | 7 | 9 | 9 | 12 | 12 | 13 | 13 | 13 | 13 | 14 | 14 | ~~DNS~~ | ~~17~~ | 85 | 68 |
| 15 | USA | Henry Thomas | Trenholm Boggs; Boomer Mazanec | USA 799 | 14 | 14 | 12 | 12 | 11 | 11 | ~~16~~ | ~~16~~ | 11 | 11 | 12 | 12 | 13 | 13 | 89 | 73 |
| 16 | USA | Paul McGuan | Patrick Gieger; Ashley Henderson | USA 601 | 15 | 15 | 13 | 13 | 14 | 14 | 15 | 15 | 15 | 15 | 16 | 16 | ~~DNF~~ | ~~17~~ | 105 | 88 |

Legend: DNC – Did not come to the starting area; DSQ – Disqualified; RET – Retired;
Discard is crossed out and does not count for the overall result.
Gender: – male; – female;

- 2009 Progress

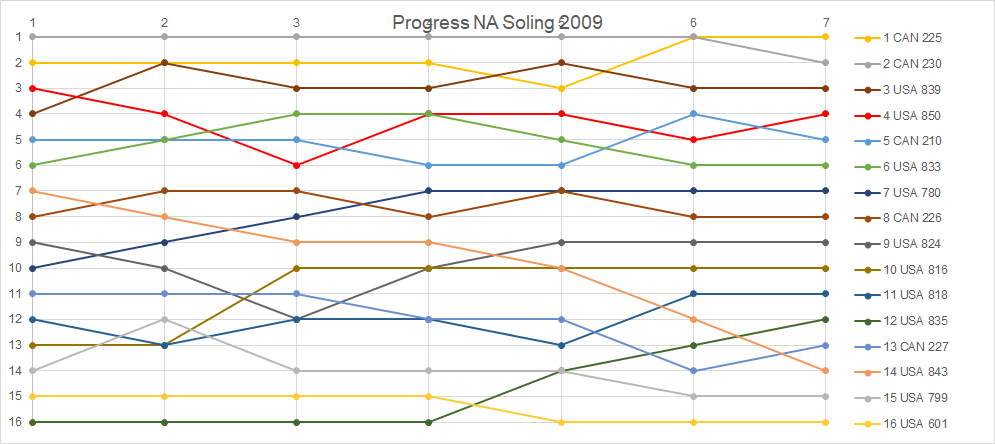

== Further results ==
For further results see:

- Soling North American Championship results (1969–79)
- Soling North American Championship results (1980–89)
- Soling North American Championship results (1990–99)
- Soling North American Championship results (2000–09)
- Soling North American Championship results (2010–19)
- Soling North American Championship results (2020–29)
