= Peter Hall (sailor) =

Canadian sailor

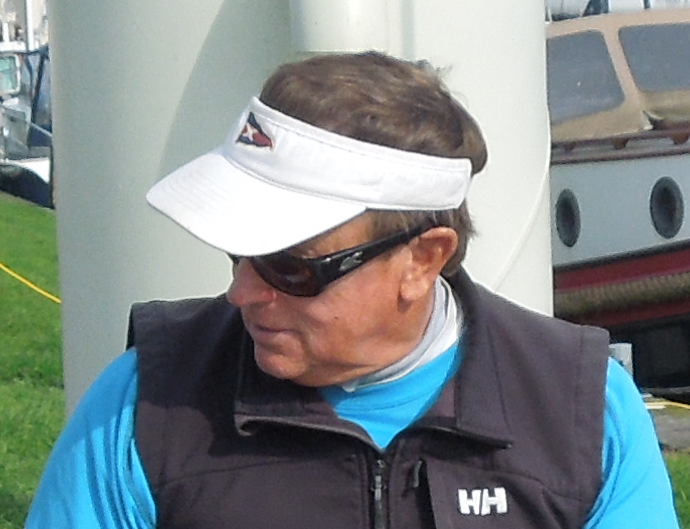
- Peter Hall at Muiden, The Netherlands (2017)

Personal information
- Nationality: Canada
- Born: June 5, 1949 (age 77) Montreal, Quebec, Canada

Sailing career
- Sport: Sailing
- Club: Life member Royal St. Lawrence Yacht Club
- Classes: Lightning; Soling
Medal record
Representing Canada
Pan American Games
Silver medal – second place	1987 Indianapolis, USA	Lighting
Vintage Yachting Games
Silver medal – second place	2018 Hellerup, Danmark	Soling
World Championships
Gold medal – first place	1989 Athens, Greece	Lightning
Gold medal – first place	2011 Prien am Chiemsee, Germany	Soling
Gold medal – first place	2012 Milwaukee, Wisconsin	Soling
Gold medal – first place	2014 Punta del Este, Uruguay	Soling
Silver medal – second place	2006 Annapolis, Maryland	Soling
Silver medal – second place	2013 Balatonalmádi, Hungary	Soling
Bronze medal – third place	2009 Etobicoke, Ontario	Soling
Master World Championships
Gold medal – first place	2001 Marsala, Italy	Lightning
Gold medal – first place	2005 Concón, Chile	Lightning
Gold medal – first place	2011 Lake Iseo, Italy	Soling
Silver medal – second place	2013 Castiglione del Lago, Italy	Lightning
European Championships
Silver medal – second place	2014 Saint-Pierre-Quiberon, France	Soling
Bronze medal – third place	2016 Ebensee, Austria	Soling
Bronze medal – third place	2023 Warnemünde, Germany	Soling
North American Championships
Gold medal – first place	2009 Plattsburgh (city), New York	Soling
Gold medal – first place	2012 Kingston, Ontario	Soling
Gold medal – first place	2014 Port Stanley, Ontario	Soling
Gold medal – first place	2015 Wilmette, Illinois	Soling
Gold medal – first place	2017 Milwaukee, Wisconsin	Soling
Silver medal – second place	2008 Toronto, Ontario	Soling
Silver medal – second place	2011 Milwaukee, Wisconsin	Soling
Silver medal – second place	2016 Sarnia, Ontario	Soling
Bronze medal – third place	1983 Rochester, New York	Soling
Bronze medal – third place	2007 Wilmette, Illinois	Soling
Bronze medal – third place	2010 Bath, Ontario	Soling
Bronze medal – third place	2013 Plattsburgh (city), New York	Soling
Bronze medal – third place	2018 Montreal, Quebec	Soling
Bronze medal – third place	2019 Kingston, Ontario	Soling
North American Masters Championship
Gold medal – first place	2010 Meledeconk River Yacht Club, Brick, NJ	Lightning
Gold medal – first place	2011 North Cape Yacht Club, LaSalle, MI	Lightning
Soling World Trophy
Gold medal – first place	2013	Soling
Gold medal – first place	2014	Soling
Gold medal – first place	2016	Soling
- Updated on 2 April 2020

Peter Hall (born June 5, 1949) is a sailor from Canada, who represented his country at the 1987 Pan American Games in Indianapolis, United States with team members Scott Morgan and Alain Boucher where they took the Silver medal in the Soling. Also at the 2018 Vintage Yachting Games in Hellerup Denmark, Hall as helmsman together with his fellow crew members Gord de Vries and Johan Offermans (The Netherlands) took the silver medal in the Soling. Hall is representing Group P in the council of World Sailing. Peter won so far four World Championships. Furthermore, he was president of the International Soling Association from 2015 - 2016.

== Early life ==
He was born on June 5, 1949, in Montreal, Quebec, Hall attended the Lower Canada College at Monkland Village, and earned a Bachelor's degree in Business Administration from Queen's University at Kingston and a bachelor's degree in law from McGill University at Montreal.

== Personal life ==
Hall lives in Montreal, is married with Margot. The couple has 3 children: Krista, Nicolas and William.

== Professional life ==
Hall is (semi-)retired from a career as lawyer and business developer at Pratt & Whitney Canada, CAE Flight Simulators, Bell Helicopter Canada, Lavalin Engineering, Teleglobe International, Caisse de dépôt et placement du Québec and Ingenium. Peter holds several board positions in the industry.

== Sailing life ==
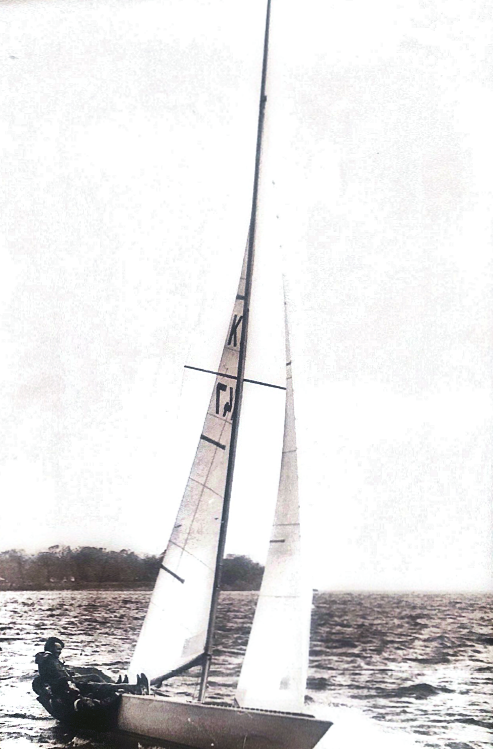
Peter Hall in Soling KC147 (1975)

Peter started sailing early in life in several classes and is a life member of the Royal St. Lawrence Yacht Club, Montreal. On the age of 26 he switched to the Soling in pursuit for an Olympic ticket. Besides the Soling he also kept sailing Lightning. After a few years without the Soling he returned to the class in 2006. Hall holds several North American Championships titles in the Soling, in the Lightning he holds one World Champions title as well as two Master titles. In 2011, 2012 and 2014 he became World Champion in the Soling. In 2012 and 14, his youngest son William was a member of the team. In 2013, 2014 and 2016 Peter received the Soling World Trophy. In 2023 Hall won the bronze medal sailing with Martin Zeileis and Max Reisinger at the European Soling Championship at Warnemünde (Germany). Peter was also president of Voile Quebec from 1994 to 1996. Peter Hall was inducted in 2017 to the Voile Québec Hall of Fame.

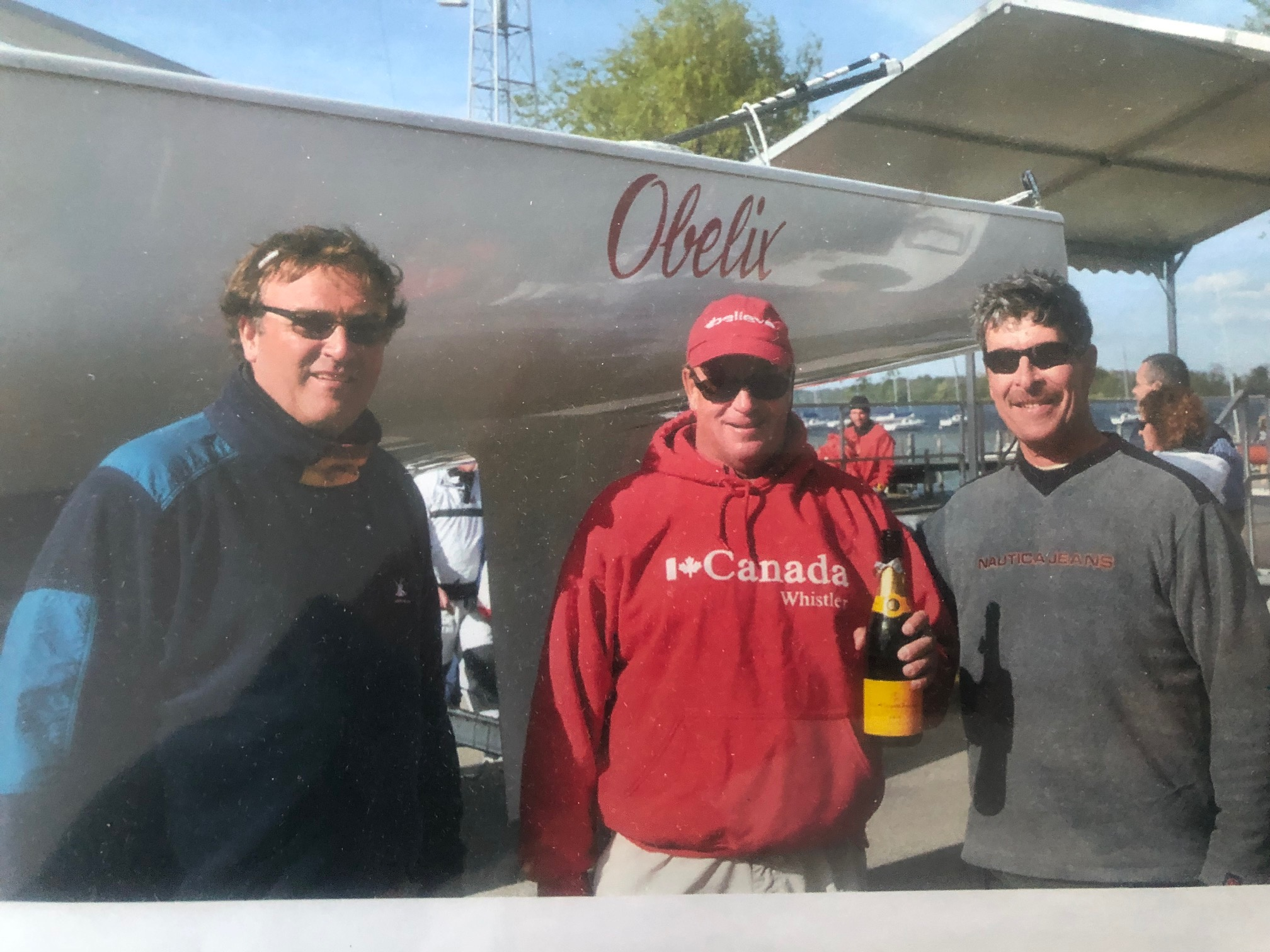
Soling World Champions 2011: From left to right Paul Davis, Peter Hall and Phillip Kerrigan

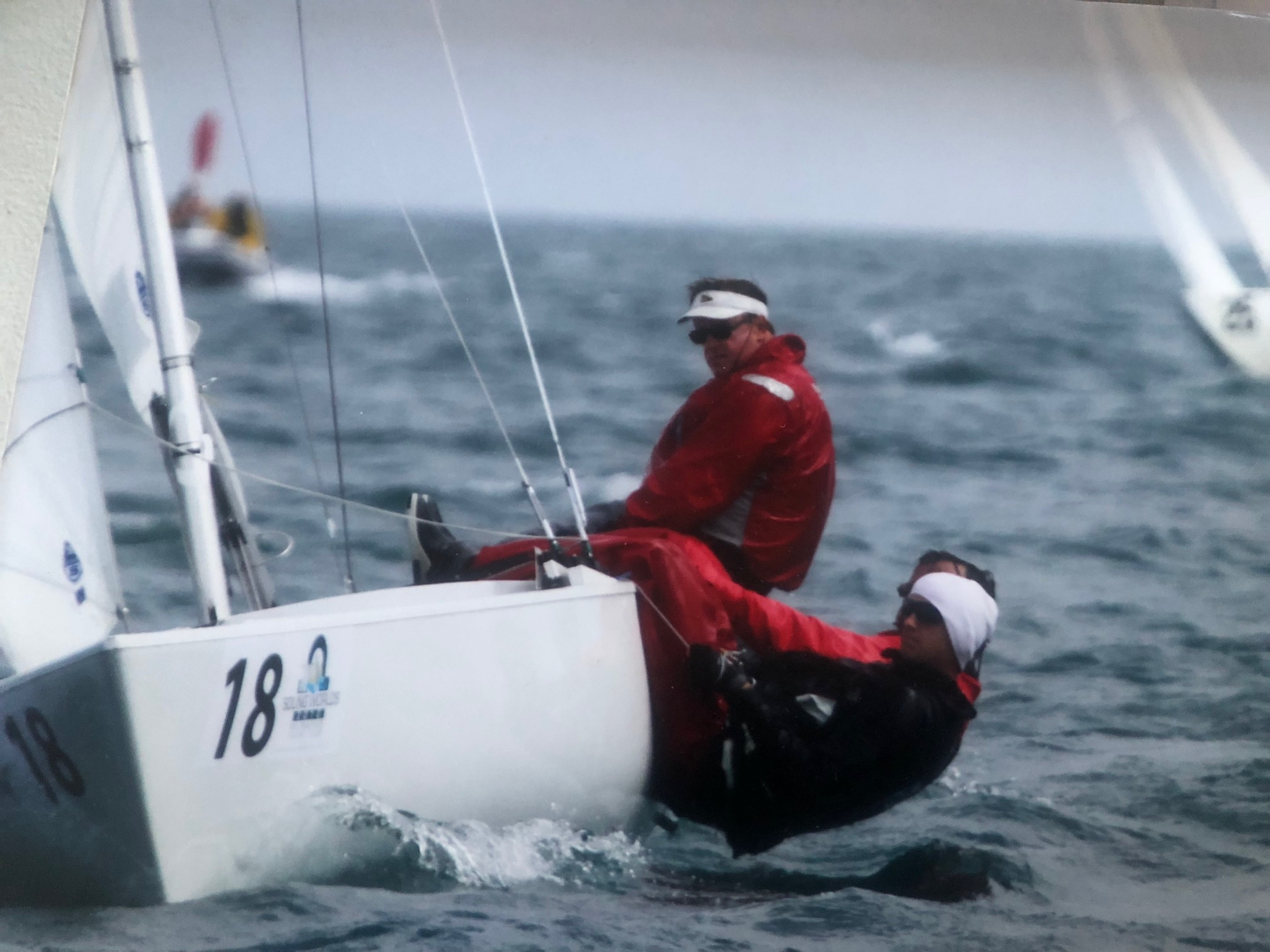
Soling World Champions 2012: From top to bottom Peter Hall, Paul Davis and Will Hall

Sporting positions
Preceded by (Netherlands) Johan Offermans	President International Soling Association; 2015 - 2016	Succeeded by (Germany) Michael Dietzel
