= Joanne Abbott =

Canadian sailor

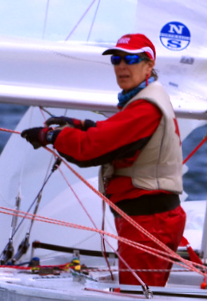

Personal information
- Born: 25 April 1955 (age 71) Sarnia, Ontario, Canada
- Height: 1.60 m (5 ft 3 in)
- Weight: 57 kg (126 lb)

Sport
- Sport: Sailing

Joanne Abbott (born 25 April 1955) is a Canadian sailor. She competed in the 1996 Summer Olympics.
