= Royal St. Lawrence Yacht Club =

Yacht club in Quebec, Canada

Coordinates: 45°26′43″N 73°45′16″W

- Burgee
- Short name: RStLYC
- Founded: 1888
- Location: Dorval, Quebec, Canada
- Website: www.rstlyc.qc.ca

The Royal Saint Lawrence Yacht Club is a yacht club located in Dorval, Quebec, Canada on the shore of Lake St. Louis.

== History ==
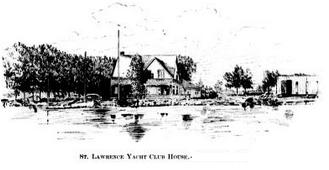
St Lawrence Yacht Club House c 1894 designed by John Rawson Gardiner

Created in 1888 by a group of men from the Amateur Athletic Association, the club quickly grew.

In 1892, John Rawson Gardiner designed the St. Lawrence Yacht Club. Between 1892-1924, the Royal St. Lawrence Yacht Club planned, developed the site, built the wharf, dredged, and erected breakwaters in Lake St. Louis, Dorval, Quebec.

Mrs W.B. Converse's 'The St. Lawrence Yacht Club Waltz' (1893) was dedicated to the Royal St Lawrence Yacht Club.

William Ramsey Spence's 'Royal St. Lawrence Yacht Club : waltzes for the piano' (no date) was "Dedicated to the Commodore and officers of the Royal St. Lawrence Yacht Club Montreal."

In 1894, Her Majesty Queen Victoria granted the Club the title "Royal". It received permission from the British Admiralty to use the Blue Ensign.

In 1894, William McLea Walbank designed a new stable, coach house and Ice House for Royal St. Lawrence Yacht Club.

In 1895, Edward Maxwell designed the Royal St. Lawrence Yacht Club clubhouse

In 1940-41, the Royal Canadian Navy Reserves scheme for training yacht club members developed the first central registry system.

In 1954 the Duke of Edinburgh extended his royal patronage to the club.

In 1988, as part of the club's centennial celebrations, E. George Hanson wrote 'The Royal St. Lawrence Yacht Club, 1888-1988'.
