= Soling North American Championship =

Soling
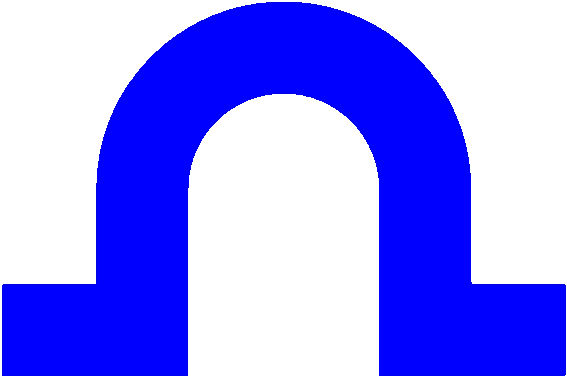
- Class insigna

Development
- Name: Soling

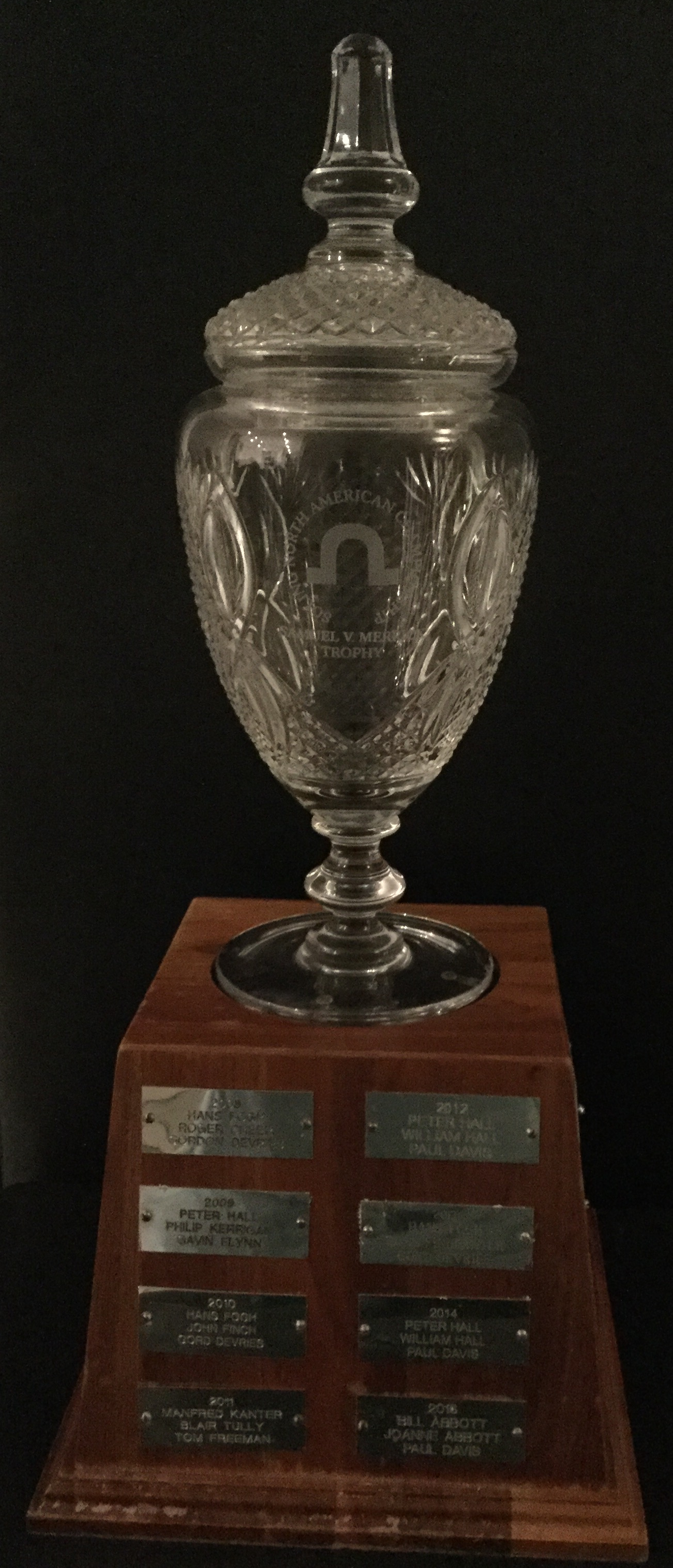
One of the three perpetual trophies for the winning team of the Soling North American Championship. The prize is donated by the late Sam Merrick. Previous winners engraved on the pedestal.

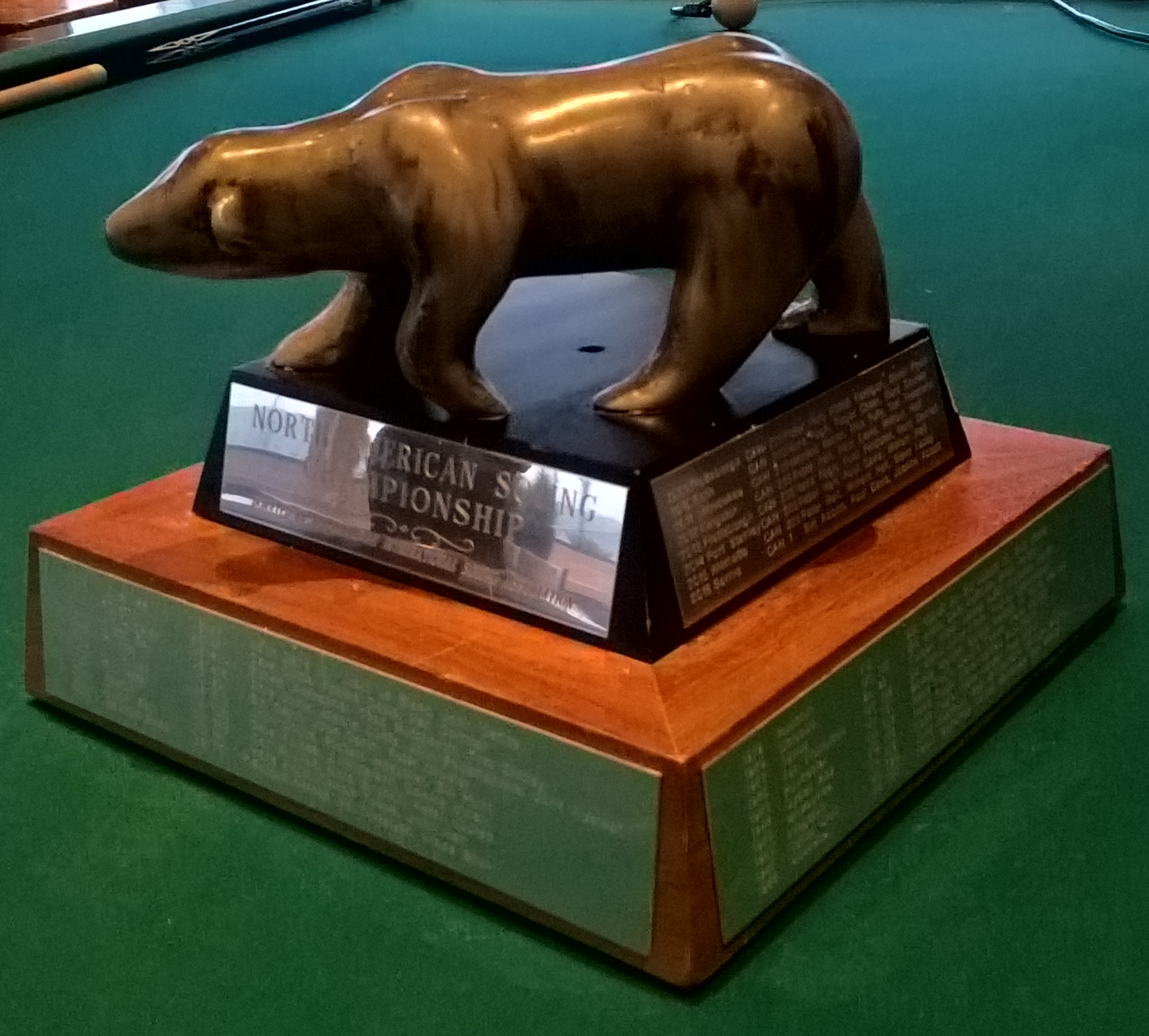
The second perpetual trophy perpetual trophies for the winning team of the Soling North American Championship. The prize is donated by the Canadian International Soling Association. Previous winners engraved on the pedestal. The Bear is created by Inuit of Canada.

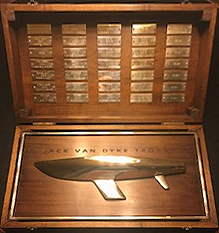
The third perpetual trophy perpetual trophies for the winning team of Red Fleet. The prize is donated by the Jack Van Dyke. Previous winners engraved on the box.

The Soling North American Championship is an International sailing regatta in the Soling organized by the International Soling Association under auspiciën of World Sailing. The initiative for this event was taken, inspired by the success of the Soling European Championship, by Milwaukee Yacht Club sailor Jack Van Dyke in 1969 to promote Soling sailing in the US and Canada. Since then over 50 Soling North American Championship were held. The popularity grew during the Olympic period of the Soling. After that era the event continued and is still reasonable successful. The Soling North American Championship is an "Open" event. This means that competitors from all over the world are eligible to enter. So far oversees entries have only won the Championship three times:

- Australia in 1975 (Australia)
- Brasil in 1981 (South America)
- The Netherlands in 2019 (Europe)

In all other cases the title went to a team of the United States or Canada (first time in 1973).

== Editions ==
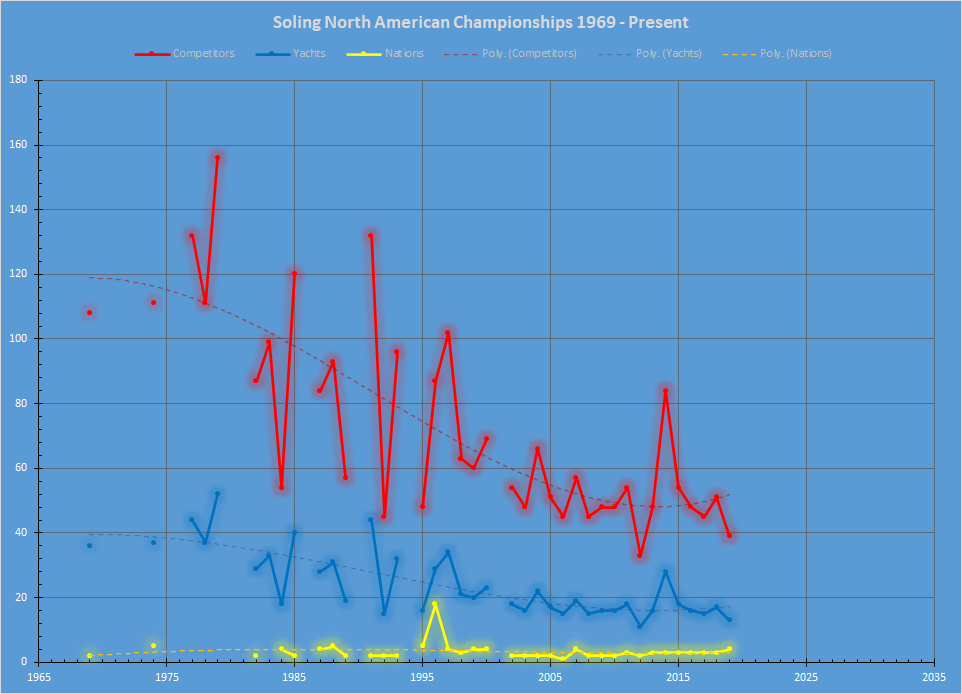
Soling North American Championships DATA 1969 - Present

Year	City	Country	Dates	Athletes	Nations	Note
1969	Milwaukee	United States	15 - 19 Jun	108	2	
1970	Houston	United States				
1971	Los Angeles	United States				
1972	Oyster Bay	United States	19 - 27 Aug			
1973	Toronto	Canada	16–23 August			
1974	Milwaukee	United States	11 - 20 Aug	111	5	
1975	Rochester	United States				
1976	Seattle	United States	6 - 13 Jul			
1977	Oyster Bay	United States		132		
1978	Newport Beach	United States	4–7 May	111		
1979	Houston	United States		156		
1980	Chicago	United States				
1981	Sarnia	Canada				
1982	San Francisco	United States	29 Sep - 2 Oct	87	2	
1983	Rochester	United States	3 - 7 Sep	99		
1984	Oyster Bay	United States	5 - 7 Oct	54	4	
1985	Milwaukee	United States	18 - 21 Jun	120	2	
1986	Kingston	Canada	28 Jun - 3-Jul			
1987	Santa Cruz	United States	24 - 28 Aug	84	4	
1988	Wilmette	United States	6 - 10 Sep	93	5	
1989	Annapolis	United States	25 - 29 Sep	57	2	
1990	Tiburon	United States	17 - 21 Sep			
1991	Chicago	United States	5 - 7 Oct	132	2	
1992	Houston	United States	1 -4 Sep	45	2	
1993	Rochester	United States	5 - 9 Jul	96	2	
1994	Oyster Bay	United States	29 Sep – 2 Oct			
1995	San Francisco	United States	2 – 6 Oct	48	5	
1996	Marblehead	United States	24 – 28 Jun	87	18	
1997	Wilmette	United States	18 – 21 Sep	102	4	
1998	Rochester	United States	10 – 13 Jun	63	3	
1999	Toronto	Canada	23 – 26 Sep	60	4	
2000	Annapolis	United States	16 – 20 Oct	69	4	
2001	Milwaukee	United States	30 Aug – 2 Sep			
2002	Wilmette	United States	22 -25 Aug	54	2	
2003	Milwaukee	United States	21 -24 Aug	48	2	
2004	Plattsburgh	United States	16 - 19 Sep	66	2	
2005	Etobicoke	Canada	16 - 18 Oct	51	2	
2006	Milwaukee	United States	13 – 16 Jul	45	1	
2007	Wilmette	United States	6 – 9 Jul	57	4	
2008	Etobicoke	Canada	19 – 22 Jun	45	2	
2009	Plattsburgh	United States	14 – 16 Aug	48	2	
2010	Bath	Canada	2 – 5 Jul	48	2	
2011	Milwaukee	United States	29 Sep - 2 Oct	54	3	
2012	Kingston	Canada	23 – 26 Aug	33	2	
2013	Plattsburgh	United States	15 – 18 Aug	48	3	
2014	Port Stanley	Canada	18 – 21 Sep	84	3	
2015	Wilmette	United States	27 – 30 Aug	54	3	
2016	Sarnia	Canada	23 – 26 Jun	48	3	
2017	Milwaukee	United States	24 – 27 Aug	45	3	
2018	Montreal	Canada	27 – 30 Sep	51	3	
2019	Kingston	Canada	8 – 11 Aug	39	4	
2020	Annapolis	United States	Planned 22–26 April; Postponed due to COVID-19			
2021	Annapolis	United States	Again postponed to 2022 due to COVID-19			
2022	Annapolis	United States	27 – 30 Sep	51	3	
2023	Hamilton	Canada	8 – 11 Jun			

== Medalists ==
Year	Gold	Silver	Bronze
1969; United States; Milwaukee	United States US 95; John Dane III; Mark LeBlanc; John Cerise	United States US ? Dick Stearns; Richie Stearns; Bruce Goldsmith	United States US 179; Gordon Lindemann; Not documented
1970; United States; Houston	United States US 437; Dave Curtis; Robbie Doyle; Ken Cormier	United States US ? Gerald Rumsey; Not documented	United States US 57; Don Bever; Not documented
1971; United States; Los Angeles	United States US 504; Robert Mosbacher; Thad Hutcheson; Tom Dickey	United States US 57; Don Bever; Not documented	United States US 414; Lowell North; Not documented
1972; United States; Oyster Bay	United States US 575; Dave Curtis; Joanne Curtis; John Rousmaniere; John Nystedt	United States US 379; Dean Mathews; Not documented	United States US 349; John Wolcot; Not documented
1973; Canada; Toronto	Canada KC 84; Sid Dakin; John Dakin; Peter Crowler	United States US 232; Jim Coggan; Not documented	United States US 564; Jon Ford; Not documented
1974; United States; Milwaukee	United States US 576; John Kolius; Richard Hoepfner; Bill Hunt	Australia KA 128; David Forbes; John Anderson; Denis O'Neil	United States US ? Jon Ford; Not documented
1975; United States; Rochester	Australia KA 128; David Forbes; John Anderson; Denis O'Neil	Canada KC 146; Sid Dakin; Not documented	Australia KA 39; Malcolm Anderson; Not documented
1976; United States; Seattle	United States US 593; Carl Buchan; Mara Buchan; Peter Scorett	United States US 627; Bill Engle; Not documented	United States US 296; Maurice Rattray; Not documented
1977; United States; Oyster Bay	Canada KC 151; Hans Fogh; Dennis Toews; John Kerr	United States US 686; Buddy Melges; Not documented	United States US 661; Joachim Shulz-Heik; Not documented
1978; United States; Newport Beach	United States US 707; Robbie Haines; Ed Trevelyan; Vince Brun	Canada KC 1 Bill Abbott Jr. Not documented	United States US 700; Buddy Melges; Not documented
1979; United States; Houston	Canada KC 1 Bill Abbott Jr. Bill Abbott Sr. Phil Bissel	United States US 712; Bill Allen; Will Perrigo; Brian Porter	United States US 697; Charlie Kamps; Bob Penticoff; Bill Blackett
1980; United States; Chicago	United States US 712; Bill Allen; Dale Hoffman; Brian Porter	Canada KC 1 Bill Abbott Jr. Bill Abbott Sr. Larry Abbott	Canada KC ? Hans Fogh; Not documented
1981; Canada; Sarnia	Brazil BL 42; Torben Grael; Daniel Adler; Ronaldo Senfft	Canada KC 1 Bill Abbott Jr. Not documented	Canada KC 169; Hans Fogh; Not documented
1982; United States; San Francisco	United States US 745; Ed Baird; Larry Klein; Tucker Edmundson	United States US 710; Dave Perry; Brad Dellenbaugh; Trevor	United States US 747; Robbie Haines; Ed Travelyan; Rod Davis
1983; United States; Rochester	United States US 757; Buddy Melges; Buddy Melges III; Hans Melges	United States KC ? Hans Fogh; Not documented	United States KC ? Peter Hall; Andreas Josenhans; Not documented
1984; United States; Oyster Bay	Canada KC ? Hans Fogh; Dennis Toews; Steve Calder	United States US ? Brian Porter; Not documented	Canada KC 1 Bill Abbott Jr. Not documented
1985; United States; Milwaukee	Canada KC 176; Hans Fogh; Steve Calder; Rob Maru	United States US 706; John Kostecki; Bob Billingham; William Baylis	United States US 758; Brian Porter; Not documented
1986; Canada; Kingston	Canada KC 176; Hans Fogh; Steve Calder; Rob Maru	United States US 777; Dave Curtis; Not documented	United States US 769; Gerard Coleman; Peter Coleman; Paul Coleman
1987; United States; Santa Cruz	United States US 736; John Kostecki; Robert Billingham; William Baylis	United States US 793; Ed Baird; Not documented	United States US 772; Kevin Mahaney; Not documented
1988; United States; Wilmette	United States US 787; Kevin Mahaney; Lance Mahaney; Jim Brady	Canada KC 185; Jim Beatty; Not documented	United States US 725; Stuart H. Walker; Not documented
1989; United States; Annapolis	United States US 787; Kevin Mahaney; Jim Brady; Doug Kern	United States US 786; Dave Curtis; Not documented	Canada KC 1 Bill Abbott Jr. Not documented
1990; United States; Tiburon	United States US 786; Dave Curtis; Brad Dellenbaugh; Robert Billingham	New Zealand KZ 16; Tom Dodson; Not documented	United States US 787; Kevin Mahaney; Jim Brady; Doug Kern
1991; United States; Chicago	United States US 772; Kevin Mahaney; Jim Brady; Doug Kern	United States US 787; John Kostecki; Robert Billingham; William Baylis	Canada KC 182; Paul Thomson; Stuart Flinn; Philip Gow
1992; United States; Houston	United States US 801; Larry Klein; Wally Corwin; Steve Burns	United States US 811; Peter Coleman; Paul Coleman; Not documented	Canada KC 196; Bruce Clifford; Chris Tattersall; Bruce Hitchner
1993; United States; Rochester	United States USA 801; Larry Klein; Wally Corwin; Steve Burns	United States USA 811; Jeff Madrigali; Jim Barton; Kent Massey	Canada CAN 201; Hans Fogh; Philip Gow; Palter
1994; United States; Oyster Bay	Canada CAN 201; Hans Fogh; Thomas Fogh; Simon van Wonderen	United States USA 823; Jeff Madrigali; Jim Barton; Kent Massey	United States USA 811; Peter Coleman; Paul Coleman; Not documented
1995; United States; San Francisco	United States USA 823; Jeff Madrigali; Jim Barton; Kent Massey	United States USA 820; Dave Curtis; Not documented	United States USA 803; Don Cohan; Not documented
1996; United States; Marblehead	United States USA 823; Jeff Madrigali; Jim Barton; Kent Massey	Denmark DEN 111; Stig Westergaard; Jens Bojsen-Møller; Jan Eli Andersen	Germany GER 307; Jochen Schumann; Thomas Flach; Bernd Jäkel
1997; United States; Wilmette	United States USA 820; Dave Curtis; Moose McKlintock; Karl Anderson	Canada CAN 1 Bill Abbott Jr. Joanne Abbott; Brad Boston	United States USA 831; Tony Rey; Burnham; Dean Brenner
1998; United States; Rochester	United States USA 823; Jeff Madrigali; Craig Healy; Hartwell Jordan	Canada CAN 214; Hans Fogh; Thomas Fogh; Michener	United States USA 831; Tony Rey; Burnham; Dean Brenner
1999; Canada; Etobicoke	United States USA 820; Dave Curtis; Frank Hart; Dean Brenner	Canada CAN 224; Hans Fogh; Not documented	Japan JPN 34; Kobun Kuramichi; Not documented
2000; United States; Annapolis	United States USA 848; Chris Larsen; Karl Anderson; Dave Moffett	Canada CAN 1 Bill Abbott Jr. Goyette; Not documented	United States USA 772; Jeff Gladchun; Norris; Smith
2001; United States; Milwaukee	United States USA 740; Kent Heitzinger; Mike Tennity; Bill Santos	Not documented	Not documented
2002; United States; Wilmette	United States USA 845; Jörgen Johnsson; Martin Johnsson; Mike Leslie	United States USA 832; Charlie Kamps; Jon Bailey; Charley Tollefsen	United States USA 740; Kent Heitzinger; Mike Tennity; Bill Santos
2003; United States; Milwaukee	United States USA 845; Jörgen Johnsson; Martin Johnsson; Augi Hernandez	United States USA 807; Joe Hoeksema; Rose Hoeksema; Michael Wolf	United States USA 832; Charlie Kamps; Vytas Kasniunas; Len Deliceat; George Petritz
2004; United States; Plattsburgh	Canada CAN 1 Bill Abbott Jr. Sarah Tucker; Jim Turvey	United States USA 831; Peter Galloway; Greg Anthony; Paul Steinborn	United States USA 839; Stuart H. Walker; Chris Brown; Bruce Empey
2005; Canada; Etobicoke	Canada CAN 1 Bill Abbott Jr. Joanne Abbott; Brad Boston	Canada CAN 230; Hans Fogh; Roger Cheer; John Kerr	Canada CAN 212; Bruce Clifford; Chris Tattersall; Matt Abbott
2006; United States; Milwaukee	United States USA 845; Jörgen Johnsson; Martin Johnsson; Augi Hernandez	United States USA 840; Jim Medley; Marc Hulburt; Chris Roberts	United States USA 832; Charlie Kamps; Vytas Kasniunas; Jon Bailey
2007; United States; Wilmette	Canada CAN 230; Hans Fogh; Roger Cheer; Gord Devries	United States USA 845; Jörgen Johnsson; Martin Johnsson; Augi Hernandez	Canada CAN 225; Peter Hall; Mike Parsons; Jami Allen
2008; Canada; Toronto	Canada CAN 230; Hans Fogh; Roger Cheer; Gord Devries	Canada CAN 225; Peter Hall; Philip Kerrigan; T. Park	Canada CAN 211; Kevin Brown; Mark Bird; Stephen Jones
2009; United States; Plattsburgh	Canada CAN 225; Peter Hall; Philip Kerrigan; Gavin Flynn	Canada CAN 230; Hans Fogh; Roger Cheer; Gord Devries	United States USA 839; Stuart H. Walker; Bruce Empey; Doug Loup
2010; Canada; Bath	Canada CAN 230; Hans Fogh; Roger Cheer; Gord Devries	United States USA 839; Stuart H. Walker; Bruce Empey; Doug Loup	Canada CAN 225; Peter Hall; Philip Kerrigan; Ross Findlater
2011; United States; Milwaukee	Canada CAN 226; Manfred Kanter; Blair Tully; Tom Freemann	Canada CAN 225; Peter Hall; Philip Kerrigan; Mike Parsons	Canada CAN 230; Hans Fogh; John Kerr; Gord Devries
2012; Canada; Kingston	Canada CAN 225; Peter Hall; Paul Davis; Will Hall	Canada CAN 230; Hans Fogh; John Finch; Gord Devries	Canada CAN 1 Bill Abbott Jr. Joanne Abbott; Scott Banford
2013; United States; Plattsburgh	Canada CAN 230; Hans Fogh; Ross Findlater; Gord Devries	Canada CAN 1 Bill Abbott Jr. Joanne Abbott; Scott Banford	Canada CAN 225; Peter Hall; Steve Lacey; Will Hall
2014; Canada; Port Stanley	Canada CAN 225; Peter Hall; Paul Davis; Will Hall	Canada CAN 1 Bill Abbott Jr. Joanne Abbott; Larry Abbott	Canada CAN 230; Thomas Fogh; Ross Findlater; Gord Devries
2015; United States; Wilmette	Canada CAN 225; Peter Hall; Will Hall; Steve Lacey	Canada CAN 230; Thomas Fogh; Ross Findlater; Gord Devries	Germany GER 11; Michael Dietzel; Tim Schutte; Hannes Ramoser
2016; Canada; Sarnia	Canada CAN 1 Bill Abbott Jr. Paul Davis; Joanne Abbott	Canada CAN 225; Peter Hall; Will Hall; Ross Findlater	Canada CAN 230; Thomas Fogh; Roger Cheer; Gord Devries
2017; United States; Milwaukee	Canada CAN 225; Peter Hall; Will Hall; Gord Devries	Germany GER 11; Michael Dietzel; Hannes Ramoser; Connor Clafin	United States USA 816; Ross Richards; Patrick Richards; Drew Kosmoski
2018; Canada; Montreal	Canada CAN 231; Manfred Kanter; Anne Marie Willan; Gord Devries	Canada CAN 1 Bill Abbott Jr. Joanne Abbott; Scotty McNeil	Canada CAN 225; Peter Hall; Will Hall; Steve Lacey
2019; Canada; Kingston	Netherlands NED 33; Rudy den Outer; Theo de Lange; Thies Bosch	Canada CAN 1 Bill Abbott Jr. Paul Davis; Joanne Abbott	Canada CAN 225; Peter Hall; Will Hall; Scotty McNeil
2020; United States; Annapolis	Postponed due to COVID-19 till 2021		
2021; United States; Annapolis	Again postponed due to COVID-19 till 2022		
2022; United States; Annapolis	Canada CAN 255; Peter Hall; John Bailey; Antoine Pacarar	Germany GER 11; Michael Dietzel; Martin Zeileis; Hannes Ramoser	United States USA 845; Dave Baum; Cate Muller; Brian Lennie
2023; Canada; Hamilton			

== Medal table ==
Countries
Rank	Nation	Gold	Silver	Bronze	Total
1	United States	27	25	28	80
2	Canada	22	21	19	62
3	Australia	1	1	1	3
4	Brazil	1	0	0	1
4	Netherlands	1	0	0	1
6	Germany	0	2	2	4
7	Denmark	0	1	0	1
7	New Zealand	0	1	0	1
9	Japan	0	0	1	1
Totals (9 entries)		52	51	51	154

== Race details ==
- Soling North American Championship results (1969–1979)
- Soling North American Championship results (1980–1989)
- Soling North American Championship results (1990–1999)
- Soling North American Championship results (2000–2009)
- Soling North American Championship results (2010–2019)
