= Soling North American Championship results (1969–1979) =

Sailing competition results

Soling
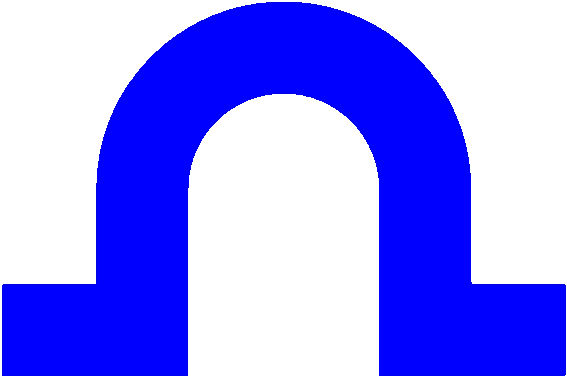

This article states the results of the North American Soling Championships from 1969 to 1979. Unfortunately, not all crew names are documented in the major sources: United States Soling Association (USSA) bulletin "Leading Edge" and International Soling Association (ISA) magazine "Soling Sailing".

== 1969 Final results ==
1969
Event title
- Edition: 1,
- Host: Milwaukee Yacht Club

Event details
- Venue: Lake Michigan
- Dates: 15–19 June
- Yachts: 36
- Key people: Jack Van Dyke
- Opening ceremony: 15 June

Competitors
- Competitors: 108
- Competing nations: 1

Results
- (gold) Gold: United States; John Dane III; Mark LeBlanc; John Cerise
- (silver) Silver: United States; Richard Stearns; Richie Stearns; Bruce Goldsmith
- (bronze) Bronze: United States; Gordon Lindemann; Crew not documented

Only the results of the first 10 boats are documented.

Rank	Country	Helmsman	Crew	Sail No.	Race 1		Race 2		Race 3		Race 4		Race 5		Race 6		Race 7		Total	Total – discard
Rank	Country	Helmsman	Crew	Sail No.	Pos.	Pts.	Pos.	Pts.	Pos.	Pts.	Pos.	Pts.	Pos.	Pts.	Pos.	Pts.	Pos.	Pts.	Total	Total – discard
1st place, gold medalist(s)	USA	John Dane III	Mark LeBlanc; John Cerise	US 95	1	0.0	1	0.0	~~5~~	~~5.7~~	1	0.0	2	3.0	1	0.0	1	0.0	8.7	3.0
2nd place, silver medalist(s)	USA	Richard Stearns	Richie Stearns; Bruce Goldsmith	US	3	5.7	4	8.0	~~16~~	~~22.0~~	2	3.0	3	5.7	6	11.7	8	14.0	70.1	48.1
3rd place, bronze medalist(s)	USA	Gordon Lindemann	Not documented	US 179	5	10.0	5	10.0	2	3.0	~~DSQ~~	~~37.0~~	1	0.0	9	15.0	16	22.0	97.0	60.0
4	USA	Charlie Kamps	Not documented	US 189	2	3.0	8	14.0	8	14.0	7	13.0	8	14.0	~~17~~	~~25.0~~	2	3.0	86.0	61.0
5	USA	Don Bever	Not documented	US 57	4	8.0	~~17~~	~~25.0~~	10	16.0	4	8.0	4	8.0	3	5.7	10	16.0	86.7	61.7
6	USA	Robert Mosbacher	Not documented	US 35	~~DSQ~~	~~37.0~~	2	3.0	4	8.0	13	19.0	21	27.0	2	3.0	3	5.7	102	65.7
7	USA	George O'Day	Not documented	US	8	14.0	7	13.0	9	15.0	3	5.7	9	15.0	10	16.0	~~21~~	~~27.0~~	105.7	78.7
8	USA	Andrew Johnston	Not documented	US 37	9	15.0	6	11.7	6	11.7	5	10.0	10	16.0	19	25.0	~~30~~	~~36.0~~	125.4	89.4
9	USA	Bob Johnstone	Not documented	US	12	18.0	~~28~~	~~34.0~~	7	13.0	16	22.0	11	17.0	7	13.0	6	11.7	128.7	94.7
10	CAN	Harry Roman	Not documented	KC 91	6	11.7	~~16~~	~~22.0~~	11	17.0	17	23.0	12	18.0	4	8.0	14	20.0	118.7	96.7

Legend: DSQ – Disqualified;
Discard is crossed out and does not count for the overall result.

- 1969 Progress

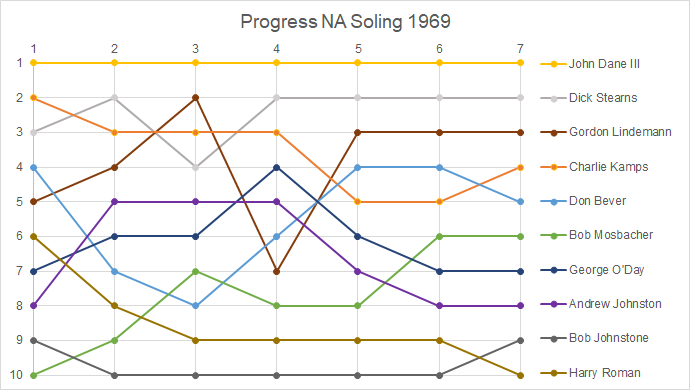

== 1970 Final results ==
1970
Event title
- Edition: 2

Event details
- Venue: Houston

Results
- (gold) Gold: United States; Dave Curtis; Robbie Doyle; Ken Cormier
- (silver) Silver: United States; Gerald Rumsey
- (bronze) Bronze: United States; Don Bever

Only the top 4 boats are documented.:

Rank	Country	Helmsman	Crew	Sail No.
1st place, gold medalist(s)	United States	Dave Curtis	Robbie Doyle; Ken Cormier	US 437
2nd place, silver medalist(s)	United States	Gerald Rumsey	Not documented	US 168
3rd place, bronze medalist(s)	United States	Don Bever	Not documented	US 57
4	United States	John Dane III	Mark LeBlanc; John Cerise	US 95

- 1970 Progress

Not enouch data to generate

== 1971 Final results ==
1971
Event title
- Edition: 3
- Host: California Yacht Club, Marina Del Rey

Event details
- Venue: Pacific coast
- Yachts: 27

Competitors
- Competitors: 81
- Competing nations: 2

Results
- (gold) Gold: United States; Robert Mosbacher; Thad Hutcheson; Tom Dickey
- (silver) Silver: United States; Don Bever; Crew not documented
- (bronze) Bronze: United States; Lowell North; Crew not documented

No detailed results are documented.

Rank	Country	Helmsman	Crew	Sail No.	Total – discard
1st place, gold medalist(s)	United States	Robert Mosbacher	Thad Hutcheson; Tom Dickey	US 504	34.0
2nd place, silver medalist(s)	United States	Don Bever	Not documented	US 57	46.0
3rd place, bronze medalist(s)	United States	Lowell North	Not documented	US 414	47.7
4	United States	Marty Gleich	Not documented	US 334	61.4
5	United States	John Dane III	Mark LeBlanc; John Cerise	US 95	63.7
6	United States	Tim Hogan	Not documented	US 265	73.7
7	United States	John Lindsay	Not documented	US 383	75.4
8	United States	Ken Young	Not documented	US 147	78.0
9	United States	Roger Welsh	Not documented	US 418	78.7
10	United States	Maurice Rattray	Not documented	US 296	79.7
11	United States	Wally Springstand	Not documented	US 395	86.7
12	United States	Gerald Rumsey	Not documented	US 168	87.0
13	United States	Jack Van Dyke	Not documented	US 500	100.7
14	United States	Roy Troendle	Not documented	US 94	101.0
15	United States	Carl Eichenlaub	Not documented	US 372	105.7
16	United States	Ben Mitchell	Not documented	US 87	115.7
17	United States	Scott Harris	Not documented	US 73	123.0
18	United States	John Kolius	Not documented	US 32	124.0
19	United States	Frank McCarthy	Not documented	US 221	143.7
20	United States	Bruce Peacey	Not documented	US 171	149.0
21	Canada	Bill Burgess	Not documented	KC 34	149.0
22	United States	Andrew Johnston	Not documented	US 372	152.0
23	United States	Bill Ibs, Jr.	Not documented	US 159	161.0
24	United States	Richard Enerson	Not documented	US 163	162.0
25	United States	Elton Balles	Not documented	US 165	171.0
26	United States	David Fox	Not documented	US 56	172.0
27	United States	Joe Ellis	Not documented	US 91	189.0

- 1971 Progress

Not enouch data to generate

== 1972 Final results ==
No documented detailed results found yet!

1972
Event title
- Edition: 4,
- Host: Seawanhaka Corinthian Yacht Club

Event details
- Venue: Oyster Bay
- Dates: 19 - 23 Aug
- Yachts: 20
- Opening ceremony: 19 Aug

Competitors
- Competitors: 61
- Competing nations: 1

Results
- (gold) Gold: United States; Dave Curtis; Joanne Curtis; John Rousmaniere; John Nystedt
- (silver) Silver: United States; Dean Mathews crew members not documented
- (bronze) Bronze: United States; John Wolcot crew members not documented

Rank	Country	Helmsman	Crew	Sail No.	Race 1		Race 2		Race 3		Race 4		Race 5		Total
Rank	Country	Helmsman	Crew	Sail No.	Pos.	Pts.	Pos.	Pts.	Pos.	Pts.	Pos.	Pts.	Pos.	Pts.	Total
1st place, gold medalist(s)	USA	Dave Curtis	Joanne Curtis; John Rousmaniere; John Nystedt	US 575	9	15.0	2	3.0	1	0.0	4	8.0	2	3.0	29.0
2nd place, silver medalist(s)	USA	Dean Mathews	Not documented	US 379	2	3.0	5	10.0	6	11.7	1	0.0	4	8.0	32.7
3rd place, bronze medalist(s)	USA	John Wolcot	Not documented	US 349	3	5.7	1	0.0	17	23.0	10	16.0	7	13.0	57.7
4	USA	Eugene Hack	Not documented	US 577	4	8.0	4	8.0	12	18.0	19	25.0	1	0.0	59.0
5	USA	Ploch	Not documented	US 537	10	16.0	8	14.0	9	15.0	2	3.0	6	11.7	59.7
6	USA	Elliott B. Oldak	Not documented	US 510	5	10.0	9	15.0	13	19.0	16	22.0	3	5.7	71.7
7	USA	Christopher Meleney	Not documented	US 279	16	22.0	3	5.7	11	17.0	3	5.7	16	22.0	72.4
8	USA	Roger Hefteran	Not documented	US 184	17	23.0	12	18.0	3	5.7	7	13.0	9	15.0	74.7
9	USA	Perry Neff	Not documented	US 342	7	13.0	7	13.0	15	21.0	6	11.7	10	16.0	74.7
10	USA	R. U. Nelson, jr.	Not documented	US 568	1	0.0	18	24.0	8	14.0	14	20.0	12	18.0	76.0
11	USA	James Ostheimer	Not documented	US 462	11	17.0	6	11.7	18	24.0	9	15.0	11	17.0	84.7
12	USA	Lindsey Hewitt	Not documented	US 228	18	24.0	10	16.0	2	3.0	17	23.0	13	19.0	85.0
13	USA	Robert B. Polhemos	Not documented	US 512	DNF	27.0	11	17.0	7	13.0	8	14.0	8	14.0	85.0
14	USA	J. Kenneth Baxter	Not documented	US 578	8	14.0	15	21.0	14	20.0	5	10.0	19	25.0	90.0
15	USA	John C. Meleney	Not documented	US 363	15	21.0	13	19.0	16	22.0	13	19.0	5	10.0	91.0
16	USA	Bruce Lee	Not documented	US 227	6	11.7	19	25.0	4	8.0	18	24.0	18	24.0	92.7
17	USA	P. James Roosevelt	Not documented	US 446	12	18.0	17	23.0	10	16.0	11	17.0	14	20.0	94.0
18	USA	Winifred Kellogg	Spencer Kellogg; Not documented	US 437	14	20.0	16	22.0	5	10.0	15	21.0	17	23.0	96.0
19	USA	Herman Whiton, Jr.	Not documented	US 506	13	19.0	14	20.0	19	25.0	12	18.0	15	21.0	103.0
20	USA	John Murdoch	Not documented	US 319	DNF	27.0	20	26.0	20	26.0	20	26.0	20	26.0	131.0

Legend: DSQ – Disqualified;
Discard is crossed out and does not count for the overall result.

- 1972 Progress

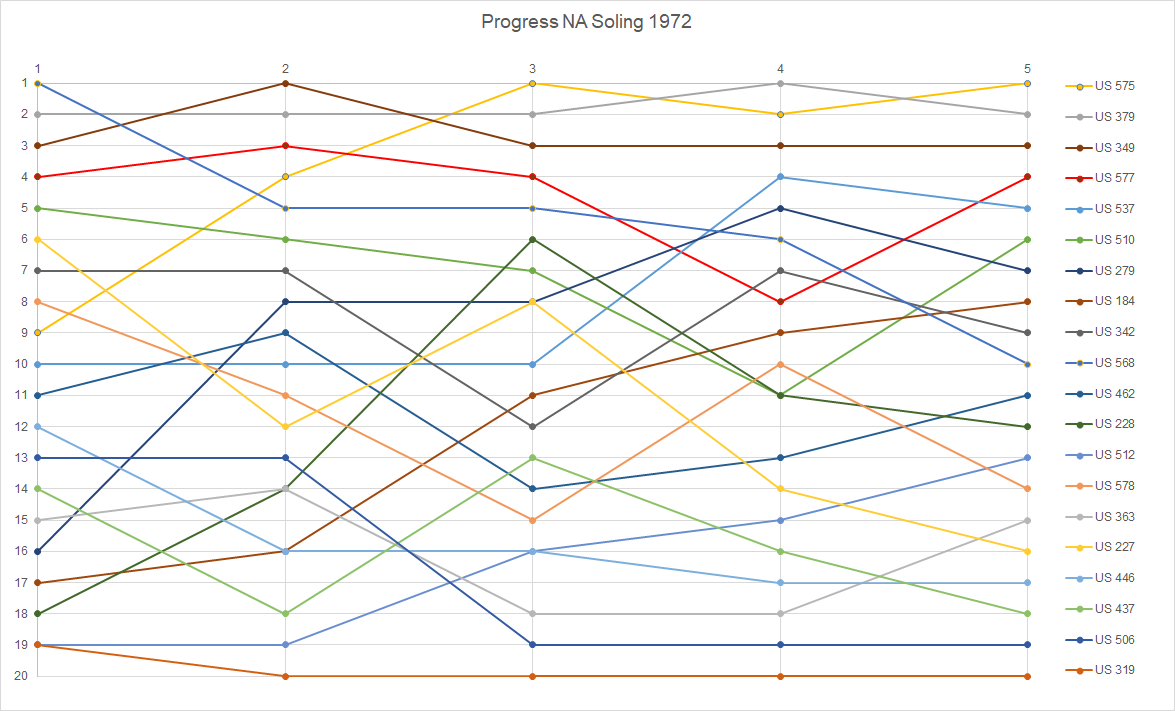

== 1973 Final results ==
1973
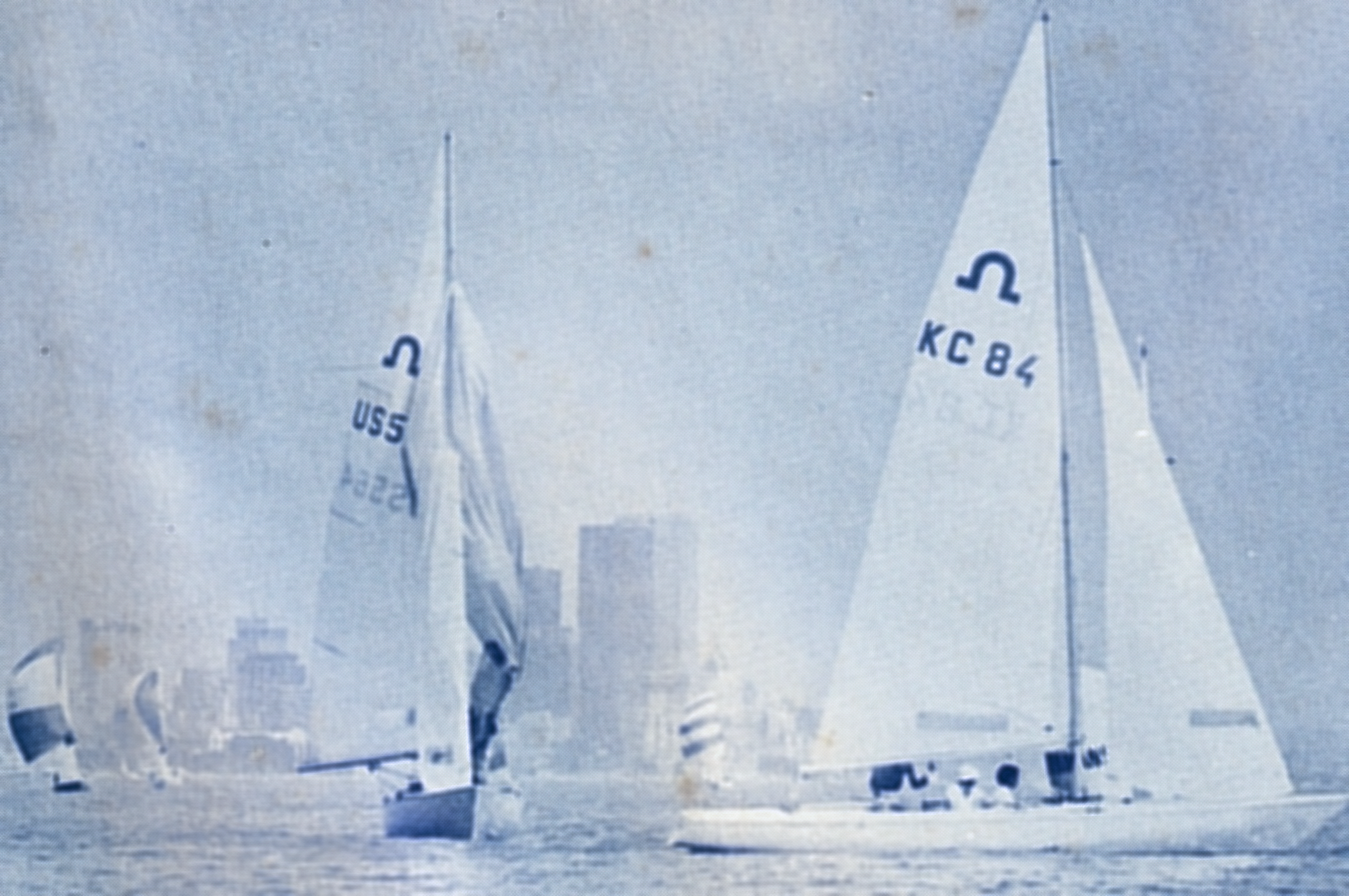

Event title
- Edition: 5

Event details
- Venue: Toronto
- Yachts: 41

Competitors
- Competitors: 123
- Competing nations: 4

Results
- (gold) Gold: Canada; Sid Dakin; John Dakin; Peter Crowler
- (silver) Silver: United States; Jim Coggan
- (bronze) Bronze: United States; Jon Ford

Only the top 4 boats are documented.:

Rank	Country	Helmsman	Crew	Sail No.
1st place, gold medalist(s)	United States	Sid Dakin	John Dakin; Peter Crowler	KC 84
2nd place, silver medalist(s)	United States	Jim Coggan	Not documented	US 232
3rd place, bronze medalist(s)	United States	Jon Ford	Not documented	US 564
4	United States	John H. Van Dyke	Not documented	US 601

- 1973 Progress

Not enouch data to generate

== 1974 Final results ==
1974
Event title
- Edition: 6
- Host: Milwaukee Yacht Club

Event details
- Venue: Lake Michigan
- Dates: 11 - 20 Aug
- Yachts: 37
- Opening ceremony: 11 Aug

Competitors
- Competitors: 111
- Competing nations: 5

Results
- (gold) Gold: United States; John Kolius; Richard Hoepfner; Bill Hunt
- (silver) Silver: Australia; David Forbes; John Anderson; Denis O'Neil
- (bronze) Bronze: United States; Jon Ford; Crew not documented

Only the results of the first 5 boats are documented:

Rank	Country	Helmsman	Crew	Sail No.	Race 1		Race 2		Race 3		Race 4		Race 5		Race 6		Race 7		Total	Total – discard
Rank	Country	Helmsman	Crew	Sail No.	Pos.	Pts.	Pos.	Pts.	Pos.	Pts.	Pos.	Pts.	Pos.	Pts.	Pos.	Pts.	Pos.	Pts.	Total	Total – discard
1st place, gold medalist(s)	USA	John Kolius	Richard Hoepfner; Bill Hunt	US 576	2	3.0	3	5.7	8	14	3	5.7	6	11.7	1	0.0	~~15~~	~~21~~	61.1	40.1
2nd place, silver medalist(s)	AUS	David Forbes	John Anderson; Denis O'Neil	KA 128	17	23.0	1	0.0	3	5.7	~~DSQ~~	~~44.0~~	6	11.7	8	14.0	2	3.0	101.4	57.4
3rd place, bronze medalist(s)	USA	Jon Ford	Not documented	US	1	0.0	15	21.0	2	3.0	9	15.0	10	16.0	2	3.0	~~18~~	~~24.0~~	82.0	58.0
4	CAN	Hans Fogh	Not documented	KC 113	8	14.0	~~DSQ~~	~~44.0~~	21	27.0	2	3.0	1	0.0	9	15.0	2	3.0	106.0	62.0
5	ESP	Juan Costas	Not documented	E 20	~~23~~	~~29.0~~	12	18.0	7	13.0	4	8.0	5	10.0	10	16.0	4	8.0	102.0	73.0

Legend: DSQ – Disqualified;
Discard is crossed out and does not count for the overall result.

- 1974 Progress

Not enouch data to generate

== 1975 Final results ==
1975
Event title
- Edition: 7
- Host: Rochester Yacht Club

Event details
- Venue: Lake Ontario
- Yachts: 20

Competitors
- Competitors: 60
- Competing nations: 4

Results
- (gold) Gold: Australia; David Forbes; John Anderson; Denis O'Neil
- (silver) Silver: Canada; Sid Dakin; Crew not documented
- (bronze) Bronze: Australia; Malcolm Anderson; Crew not documented

Only the results of the first 10 boats are documented.

Rank	Country	Helmsman	Crew	Sail No.	Race 1		Race 2		Race 3		Race 4		Race 5		Race 6		Race 7		Total	Total – discard
Rank	Country	Helmsman	Crew	Sail No.	Pos.	Pts.	Pos.	Pts.	Pos.	Pts.	Pos.	Pts.	Pos.	Pts.	Pos.	Pts.	Pos.	Pts.	Total	Total – discard
1	AUS	David Forbes	John Anderson; Denis O'Neil	KA 128	3	5.7	~~14~~	~~20~~	1	0	3	5.7	1	0	2	3	2	3	37.4	17.4
2	CAN	Sid Dakin	Not documented	KC 146	1	0	9	15	2	3	5	10	~~9~~	~~15~~	3	5.7	3	5.7	54.4	39.4
3	AUS	Malcolm Anderson	Not documented	KA 39	2	3	8	14	3	5.7	1	0	5	10	4	8	~~11~~	~~17~~	57.7	40.7
4	CAN	Glen Dexter	Not documented	KC 132	4	8	6	11.7	5	10	4	8	3	5.7	~~6~~	~~11.7~~	1	0	55.1	43.4
5	CAN	Peter Hall	Not documented	KC 147	10	16	12	18	4	8	~~DSQ~~	~~27~~	2	3	1	0	6	11.7	83.7	56.7
6	USA	James Medley	Not documented	US 579	11	17	~~17~~	~~23~~	6	11.7	2	3	11	17	7	13	9	15	99.7	76.7
7	USA	Jerry Castle	Not documented	US ?	7	13	~~16~~	~~22~~	7	13	8	14	6	11.7	10	16	5	10	99.7	77.7
8	BRA	Mirando Pontes	Not documented	BL ?	8	14	3	5.7	9	15	~~DSQ~~	~~27~~	4	8	12	18	DNF	27	114.7	87.7
9	USA	John Odenbach	Not documented	US 203	14	20	2	3	13	19	10	16	7	13	11	17	~~18~~	~~24~~	112.0	88.0
10	CAN	Andy Meray-Horwath	Not documented	KC ?	~~DNF~~	~~27~~	1	0	11	17	14	20	21	26	16	22	4	8	120.0	93.0

Legend: DSQ – Disqualified; PMS – Premature start;
Discard is crossed out and does not count for the overall result.

- 1975 Progress

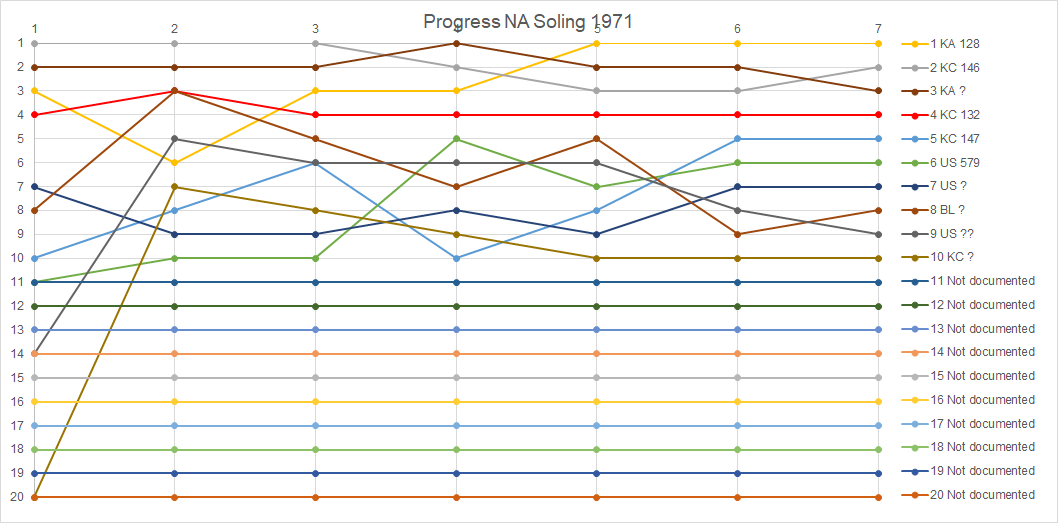

== 1976 Final results ==
1976
Event title
- Edition: 8
- Host: Seattle Yacht Club

Event details
- Venue: Puget Sound
- Dates: 6–13 July
- Yachts: 14
- Opening ceremony: 6 July

Competitors
- Competitors: 43
- Competing nations: 1

Results
- (gold) Gold: United States; Carl Buchan; Mara Buchan; Peter Scorett
- (silver) Silver: United States; Bill Engle; Crew not documented
- (bronze) Bronze: United States; Maurice Rattray; Crew not documented

Rank	Country	Helmsman	Crew	Sail No.	Race 1		Race 2		Race 3		Race 4		Race 5		Race 6		Race 7		Total – discard
Rank	Country	Helmsman	Crew	Sail No.	Pos.	Pts.	Pos.	Pts.	Pos.	Pts.	Pos.	Pts.	Pos.	Pts.	Pos.	Pts.	Pos.	Pts.	Total – discard
1st place, gold medalist(s)	USA	Carl Buchan	Mara Buchan; Peter Scorett	US 593	~~PMS~~	~~21.0~~	2	3.0	6	11.7	1	0.0	1	0.0	1	0.0	1	0.0	14.7
2nd place, silver medalist(s)	USA	Bill Engle	Not documented	US 627													3	5.7	38.4
3rd place, bronze medalist(s)	USA	Maurice Rattray	Not documented	US 296	~~PMS~~	~~21.0~~			1	0.0									48.7
4	USA	Jonathan McKee	Not documented	US 483			1	0.0											51.0
5	USA	Henry Muller	Not documented	US 131	1	0.0											2	3.0	54.4
6	USA	Jim Medley	Not documented	US 579													~~DSQ~~	~~21.0~~	62.7
7	USA	Kenfick	Not documented	US 460															63.0
8	USA	Sharpneck	Not documented	US 230															74.7
9	USA	James	Not documented	US 380															80.4
10	USA	Sayers	Not documented	US 647															81.7
11	USA	Ward - Mercer	Not documented	US 73															82.7
12	USA	Marilyn Thordarson	Not documented	US 580															86.7
13	USA	Stevenson	Not documented	US 633															99.0
14	USA	Coppock	Not documented	US 163															110.0

Legend: DSQ – Disqualified; PMS – Premature start;
Discard is crossed out and does not count for the overall result.

- 1976 Progress

Not enouch data to generate

== 1977 Final results ==
1977
Event title
- Edition: 9,
- Host: Seawanhaka Corinthian Yacht Club

Event details
- Venue: Oyster Bay
- Yachts: 44

Competitors
- Competitors: 132
- Competing nations: 4

Results
- (gold) Gold: Canada; Hans Fogh; Dennis Toews; John Kerr
- (silver) Silver: United States; Buddy Melges; Crew not documented
- (bronze) Bronze: United States; Joachim Shulz-Heik; Crew not documented

Rank	Country	Helmsman	Crew	Sail No.	Race 1		Race 2		Race 3		Race 4		Race 5		Total
Rank	Country	Helmsman	Crew	Sail No.	Pos.	Pts.	Pos.	Pts.	Pos.	Pts.	Pos.	Pts.	Pos.	Pts.	Total
1st place, gold medalist(s)	CAN	Hans Fogh	Dennis Toews; John Kerr	KC 151	2	3	2	3	4	8	1	0	2	3	17.0
2nd place, silver medalist(s)	USA	Buddy Melges	Not documented	US 686	6	11.7	3	5.7	2	3	2	3	1	0	23.4
3rd place, bronze medalist(s)	USA	Joachim Shulz-Heik	Not documented	US 661	1	0	5	10	5	10	4	8	4	8	36.0
4	USA	Charlie Kamps	Not documented	US 547	11	17	1	0	1	0	7	13	11	17	47.0
5	CAN	Sid Dakin	Not documented	KC 146	3	5.7	8	14	3	5.7	13	19	8	14	58.4
6	CAN	Peter Hall	Not documented	KC 147	4	8	19	25	19	25	3	5.7	5	10	73.7
7	USA	Sam Merrick	Not documented	US 654	14	20	12	18	10	16	9	15	3	5.7	74.7
8	CAN	Glen Dexter	Not documented	KC 132	10	16	4	8	15	21	5	10	RET	51	106.0
9	USA	Francisco	Not documented	US 641	8	14	24	30	27	33	10	16	10	16	109.0
10	USA	Robbie Doyle	Not documented	US 607	9	15	14	20	14	20	27	33	16	22	110.0
11	CAN	Jim Beatty	Not documented	KC 144	22	28	26	32	8	14	19	25	7	13	112.0
12	USA	Meleny	Not documented	US 643	13	19	21	27	26	32	17	23	9	15	116.0
13	CAN	Bill Abbott Jr.	Not documented	KC 1	DNS	51	15	21	21	27	6	11.7	6	11.7	122.4
14	USA	Don Cohan	Not documented	US 693	17	23	28	34	23	29	12	18	15	21	125.0
15	USA	Karin Olsen Campia	Not documented	US 676	33	39	18	24	16	22	15	21	13	19	125.0
16	IRL	Fay	Not documented	IR 1	21	27	27	33	22	28	16	22	12	18	128.0
17	USA	Davies	Not documented	US 663	19	25	7	13	30	36	23	29	20	26	129.0
18	USA	Palm	Not documented	US 656	15	21	36	42	20	26	14	20	14	20	129.0
19	USA	Crane	Not documented	US 577	12	18	23	29	9	15	11	17	DNS	51	130.0
20	USA	Dave Curtis	Not documented	US 658	5	10	9	15	7	13	DNF	51	DNS	51	140.0
21	USA	Polhemus	Not documented	US 512	29	35	11	17	25	31	25	31	21	27	141.0
22	USA	Dunwoody	Not documented	US 574	27	33	33	39	17	23	21	27	17	23	145.0
23	USA	Kelly	Not documented	US 520	20	26	20	26	29	35	8	14	RET	51	152.0
24	USA	Kelloq	Not documented	US 437	16	22	30	36	24	30	28	34	24	30	152.0
25	PUR	Juan R. Torruella	Not documented	PR 1	30	36	6	11.7	40	46	30	36	19	25	154.7
26	USA	Lorentzen	Not documented	US 589	31	37	25	31	18	24	18	24	DNS	51	167.0
27	USA	Stuart H. Walker	Not documented	US 662	25	31	10	16	13	19	DNF	51	DNS	51	168.0
28	USA	Nielson	Not documented	US 660	24	30	13	19	12	18	DSQ	51	DNF	51	169.0
29	USA	Nelson	Not documented	US 568	28	34	22	28	37	43	29	35	23	29	169.0
30	CAN	Weiss	Not documented	KC 130	18	24	29	35	6	11.7	DNF	51	DNS	51	172.7
31	USA	Park	Not documented	US 645	32	38	35	41	34	40	24	30	18	24	173.0
32	USA	Galloway	Not documented	US 648	7	13	17	23	35	41	DNF	51	DNS	51	179.0
33	USA	Franzel	Not documented	US 278	41	47	34	40	28	34	26	32	22	28	181.0
34	USA	Roosevelt	Not documented	US 670	35	41	32	38	11	17	RET	51	DNF	51	198.0
35	PUR	Tulla	Not documented	PR 2	36	42	37	43	33	39	20	26	RET	51	201.0
36	USA	Morrison	Not documented	US 510	23	29	31	37	32	38	DNS	51	DNS	51	206.0
37	USA	Lee	Not documented	US 278	40	46	42	48	38	44	32	38	26	32	208.0
38	USA	Hutcheson	Not documented	US 671	34	40	16	22	41	47	DNS	51	DNS	51	211.0
39	USA	Walcott	Not documented	US 349	26	32	RET	51	RET	51	22	28	RET	51	213.0
40	USA	Blatch	Not documented	US 672	39	45	38	44	31	37	31	37	DNS	51	214.0
41	USA	Cameron	Not documented	US 657	37	43	39	45	36	42	DNF	51	27	33	214.0
42	USA	English	Not documented	US 449	DNS	51	40	46	42	48	33	39	25	31	215.0
43	USA	Nobman	Not documented	US 292	38	44	41	47	39	45	DNF	51	DNS	51	238.0
44	USA	Gould	Not documented	US 388	DNS	51	DNS	51	DNS	51	DNF	51	DNS	51	255.0

Legend: DNF – Did not finish; DNS – Did not start; DSQ – Disqualified; PMS – Premature start; RET – Retired;
Discard is crossed out and does not count for the overall result.

- 1977 Progress

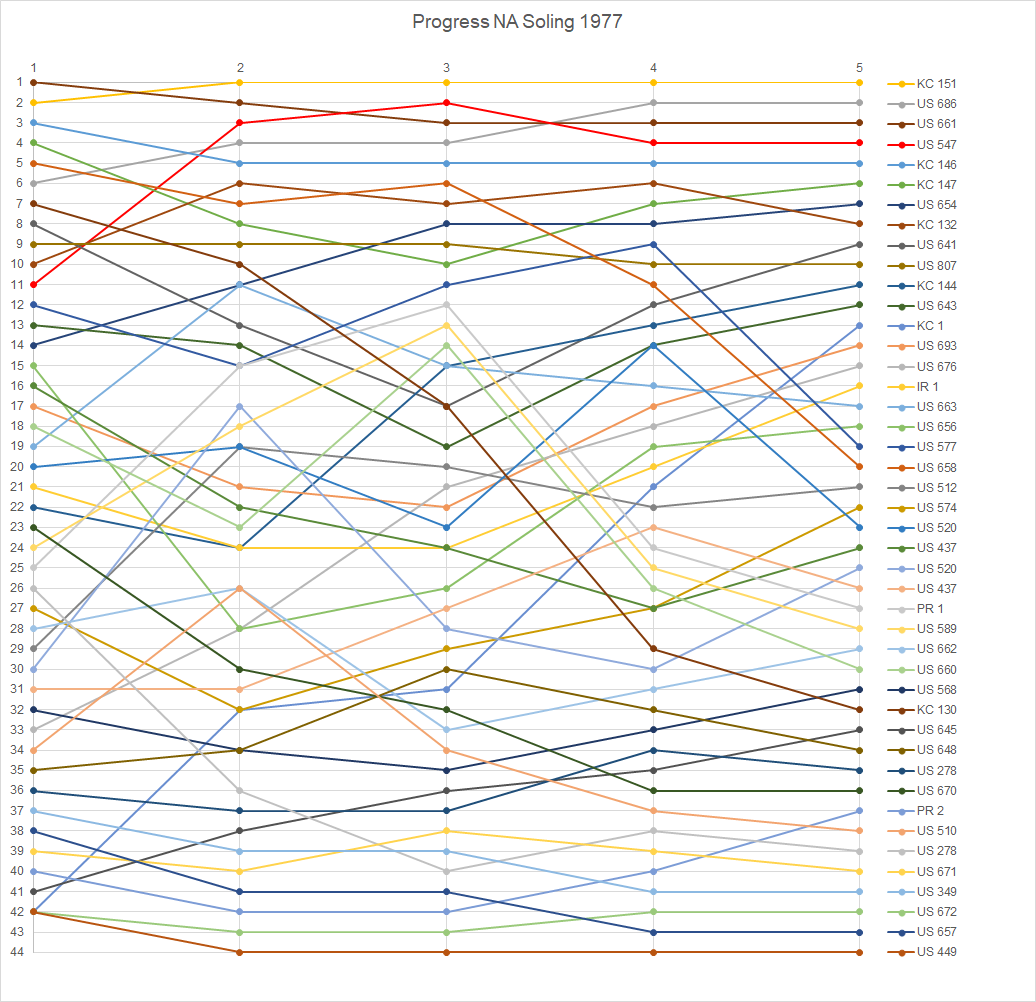

== 1978 Final results ==
1978
Event title
- Edition: 10,

Event details
- Venue: Newport Beach, Pacific Ocean
- Dates: 4–7 May
- Yachts: 37
- Opening ceremony: 4 May

Competitors
- Competitors: 111
- Competing nations: 2

Results
- (gold) Gold: United States; Robbie Haines; Ed Trevelyan; Vince Brun
- (silver) Silver: Canada; Bill Abbott Jr. Crew not documented
- (bronze) Bronze: United States; Buddy Melges; Crew not documented

Only the results of the first 10 boats are documented.

Rank	Country	Helmsman	Crew	Sail No.	Race 1		Race 2		Race 3		Race 4		Race 5		Race 6		Total	Total – discard
Rank	Country	Helmsman	Crew	Sail No.	Pos.	Pts.	Pos.	Pts.	Pos.	Pts.	Pos.	Pts.	Pos.	Pts.	Pos.	Pts.	Total	Total – discard
1st place, gold medalist(s)	USA	Robbie Haines	Ed Trevelyan; Vince Brun	US 707	1	0	1	0	1	0	1	0	~~4~~	~~8~~	3	5.7	13.7	5.7
2nd place, silver medalist(s)	CAN	Bill Abbott Jr.	Not documented	KC 1	3	5.7	7	13	2	3	3	5.7	1	0	~~28~~	~~34~~	61.4	27.4
3rd place, bronze medalist(s)	USA	Buddy Melges	Not documented	US 700	2	3	~~5~~	~~10~~	3	5.7	2	3	3	5.7	5	10	37.4	27.4
4	USA	Jim Coggen	Not documented	US 695	~~10~~	~~16~~	2	3	4	8	5	10	6	11.7	6	11.7	60.4	44.4
5	CAN	Hans Fogh	Not documented	KC 151	4	8	10	16	15	21	~~DNS~~	~~44~~	7	13	2	3	105.0	61.0
6	USA	Jerry Rumsey	Not documented	US Jerry Rumsey	9	15	11	17	5	10	~~16~~	~~22~~	10	16	4	8	88.0	66.0
7	USA	John Driscoll	Not documented	US John Driscoll	11	17	~~22~~	~~28~~	7	13	9	15	2	3	13	19	95.0	67.0
8	USA	Jim Medley	Not documented	US 701	13	19	6	11.7	~~22~~	~~28~~	8	14	17	23	1	0	95.7	67.7
9	USA	Maurice Rattray	Not documented	US 666	6	11.7	8	14	8	14	11	17	~~22~~	~~28~~	7	13	97.7	69.7
10	USA	Bill Logan	Not documented	US Bill Logan	12	18	4	8	10	16	14	20	~~15~~	~~21~~	10	16	99.0	78.0

Legend: DNF – Did not finish; DNS – Did not start; DSQ – Disqualified; PMS – Premature start; RET – Retired;
Discard is crossed out and does not count for the overall result.

- 1978 Progress

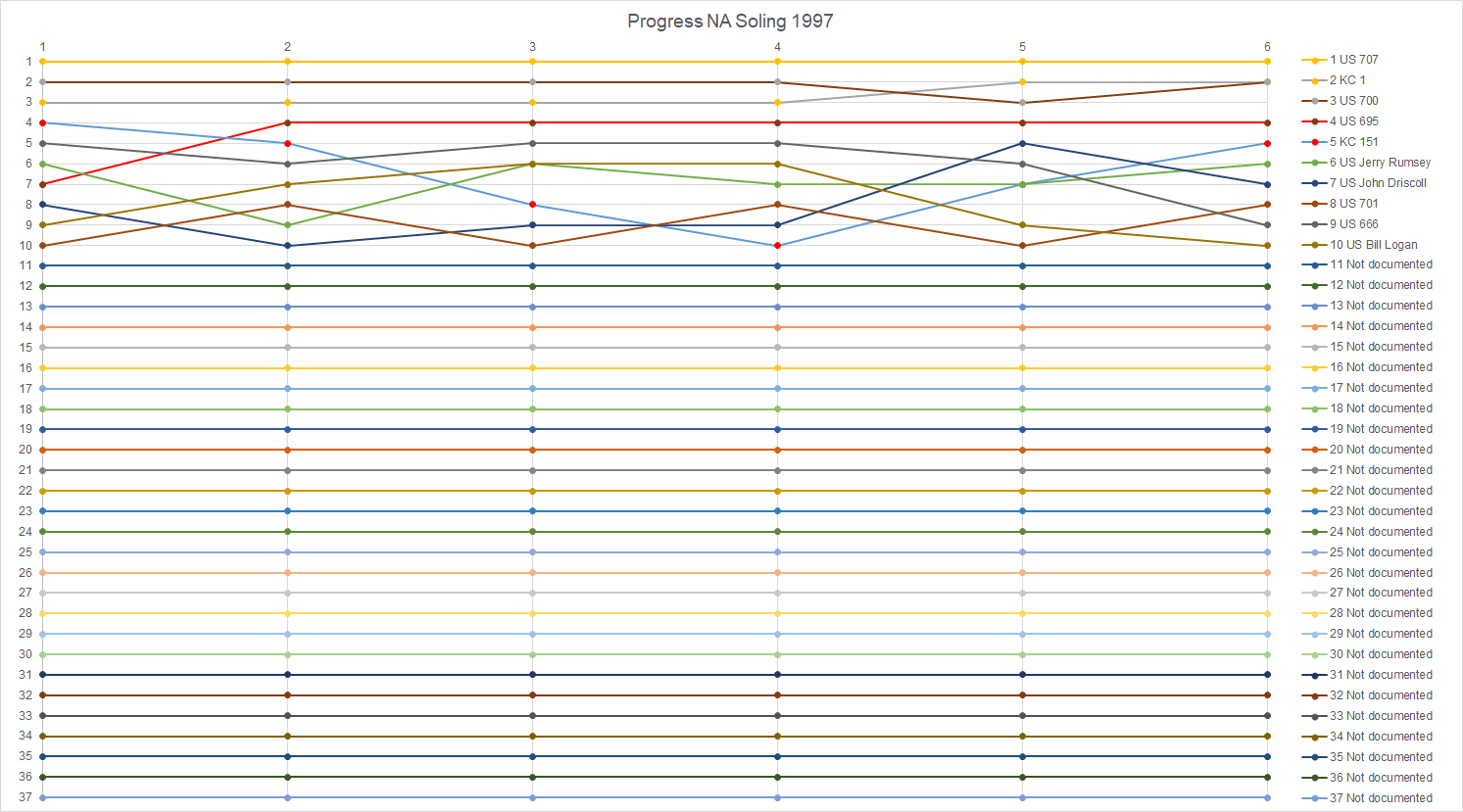

== 1979 Final results ==
1979
Event title
- Edition: 11,

Event details
- Venue: Galveston Bay
- Dates: 4–7 May
- Yachts: 52
- Opening ceremony: 4 May

Competitors
- Competitors: 156
- Competing nations: 5

Results
- (gold) Gold: Canada; Bill Abbott Jr. Bill Abbott Sr. Phil Bissel
- (silver) Silver: United States; Bill Allen; Will Perrigo; Brian Porter
- (bronze) Bronze: United States; Charlie Kamps; Bob Penticoff; Bill Blackett

=== Controversy ===
This edition of the Soling North American Championship had a long aftermath. In race 5, US 697 (Charlie Kamps), Milwaukee, was penalized with a 50% bonus as result of a protest from US 574 (Mac Dunwoody) from Houston. US 697 made several appeals, which resulted in a reinstatement of the US 697 and a penalty of 50% bonus for US 574 on 5 February 1981. This decision was made by the TYA Appeals Committee, consisting of:

- Robert W. Gough Jr. (TYA)
- Jim Anderson (TYA)
- Dr. David Green (TYA)

=== Top ten before reinstatement of Kamps (1979) ===
Rank	Country	Helmsman	Sail No.	Race 1		Race 2		Race 3		Race 4		Race 5		Race 6		Total	Total – discard
Rank	Country	Helmsman	Sail No.	Pos.	Pts.	Pos.	Pts.	Pos.	Pts.	Pos.	Pts.	Pos.	Pts.	Pos.	Pts.	Total	Total – discard
1st place, gold medalist(s)	CAN	Bill Abbott Jr.	KC 1	3	5.7	4	8	~~11~~	~~17~~	8	14	8	14	2	3	61.7	44.7
2nd place, silver medalist(s)	USA	Bill Allen	US 712	10	16	5	10	2	3	3	5.7	~~11~~	~~17~~	6	11.7	63.4	46.4
3rd place, bronze medalist(s)	USA	Jim Coggan	US 695	~~18~~	~~24~~	12	18	15	21	4	8	1	0	11	17	88.0	64.0
4	USA	Buddy Melges	US 700	~~35~~	~~41~~	11	17	1	0	13	19	17	23	3	5.7	105.7	64.7
5	CAN	Hans Fogh	KC 152	4	8	~~16~~	~~22~~	9	15	5	10	9	15	13	19	89.0	67.0
6	USA	Robbie Haines	US 707	~~37~~	~~43~~	3	5.7	6	11.7	1	0	16	22	PEN	28	110.4	67.4
7	USA	John Kolius	US 613	~~38~~	~~44~~	2	3	12	18	7	13	14	20	9	15	113.0	69.0
8	USA	Dave Curtis	US 658	1	0	26	32	14	20	6	11.7	7	13	~~23~~	~~29~~	105.7	73.7
9	USA	Charlie Kamps	US 697	13	19	6	11.7	5	10	2	3	~~PEN~~	~~36~~	30	36	115.7	79.7
10	USA	Peter Isler	US 710	6	11.7	1	0	16	22	22	28	13	19	~~27~~	~~33~~	113.7	80.7

=== Complete results after reinstatement of Kamps (1981) ===
Rank	Country	Helmsman	Crew	Sail No.	Race 1		Race 2		Race 3		Race 4		Race 5		Race 6		Total	Total – discard
Rank	Country	Helmsman	Crew	Sail No.	Pos.	Pts.	Pos.	Pts.	Pos.	Pts.	Pos.	Pts.	Pos.	Pts.	Pos.	Pts.	Total	Total – discard
1	CAN	Bill Abbott Jr.	Bill Abbott Sr. Phil Bissel	KC 1	3	5.7	4	8	~~11~~	~~17~~	8	14	8	14	2	3	61.7	44.7
2	USA	Bill Allen	Will Perrigo; Brian Porter	US 712	10	16	5	10	2	3	3	5.7	~~11~~	~~17~~	6	11.7	63.4	46.4
3	USA	Charlie Kamps	Robert Penticoff; Bill Blackett	US 697	13	19	6	11.7	5	10	2	3	4	8	~~30~~	~~36~~	87.7	51.7
4	USA	Jim Coggan	Not documented	US 695	~~18~~	~~24~~	12	18	15	21	4	8	1	0	11	17	88.0	64.0
5	USA	Buddy Melges	Not documented	US 700	~~35~~	~~41~~	11	17	1	0	13	19	17	23	3	5.7	105.7	64.7
6	CAN	Hans Fogh	Not documented	KC 152	4	8	~~16~~	~~22~~	9	15	5	10	9	15	13	19	89.0	67.0
7	USA	Robbie Haines	Not documented	US 707	~~37~~	~~43~~	3	5.7	6	11.7	1	0	16	22	PEN	28	110.4	67.4
8	USA	John Kolius	Not documented	US 613	~~38~~	~~44~~	2	3	12	18	7	13	14	20	9	15	113.0	69.0
9	USA	Dave Curtis	Not documented	US 658	1	0	~~26~~	~~32~~	14	20	6	11.7	7	13	23	29	105.7	73.7
10	USA	Peter Isler	Not documented	US 710	6	11.7	1	0	16	22	22	28	13	19	~~27~~	~~33~~	113.7	80.7
11	CAN	Glenn Dexter	Not documented	KC 140	8	14	~~24~~	~~30~~	3	5.7	11	17	25	31	10	16	113.7	82.7
12	NOR	Odd Roar Lofterød	Not documented	N 93	11	17	18	24	18	24	14	20	~~20~~	~~26~~	4	8	119.0	93.0
13	USA	Ed Baird	Not documented	US 693	25	31	7	13	13	19	16	22	~~27~~	~~33~~	5	10	128.0	95.0
14	CAN	Peter Hall	Not documented	KC 163	15	21	~~PEN~~	~~68~~	4	8	21	27	23	29	15	21	174.0	106.0
15	USA	Maurice Rattray	Not documented	US 666	7	13	PEN	33	34	40	9	15	3	5.7	~~38~~	~~44~~	150.7	106.7
16	USA	Argyle Campbell	Not documented	US 699	~~33~~	~~39~~	PEN	29	10	16	10	16	24	30	16	22	152.0	113.0
17	USA	Jim Medley	Not documented	US 701	16	22	14	20	~~37~~	~~43~~	20	26	12	18	22	28	157.0	114.0
18	SWE	Stig Wennerstrom	Not documented	S 116	27	33	~~40~~	~~46~~	7	13	31	37	15	21	8	14	164.0	118.0
19	USA	Jim Gunning	Not documented	US 579	20	26	~~39~~	~~45~~	19	25	15	21	5	10	34	40	167.0	122.0
20	USA	Bruce MacLeod	Not documented	US 589	12	18	20	26	22	28	12	18	~~32~~	~~38~~	26	32	160.0	122.0
21	USA	Glenn Darden	Not documented	US 715	36	42	~~PEN~~	~~48~~	25	31	29	35	2	3	7	13	172.0	124.0
22	USA	Peter Galloway	Not documented	US 648	32	38	27	33	21	27	~~39~~	~~45~~	21	27	1	0	170.0	125.0
23	USA	Don Cohan	Not documented	US 583	2	3	23	29	~~36~~	~~42~~	27	33	30	36	25	31	174.0	132.0
24	BRA	Eduardo Ramos	Not documented	BL 35	22	28	PEN	31	20	26	~~30~~	~~36~~	18	24	17	23	168.0	132.0
25	USA	Robert Mosbacher	Not documented	US 721	~~47~~	~~53~~	35	41	8	14	24	30	19	25	21	27	190.0	137.0
26	USA	Brad Alford	Not documented	US 659	~~48~~	~~54~~	25	31	28	34	25	31	10	16	24	30	196.0	142.0
27	USA	Jo Schulz-Heik	Not documented	US 717	17	23	8	14	PEN	57	~~DNS~~	~~59~~	26	32	14	20	205.0	146.0
28	USA	Mac Dunwoody	Not documented	US 574	19	25	9	15	29	35	26	32	~~PEN~~	~~60~~	35	41	208.0	148.0
29	CAN	Tom Weiss	Not documented	KC 130	9	15	21	27	33	39	23	29	~~37~~	~~43~~	37	43	196.0	153.0
30	USA	Dave Frenzel	Not documented	US 704	14	20	10	16	17	23	41	47	41	47	~~43~~	~~49~~	202.0	153.0
31	USA	Karen Olsen Campia	Not documented	US 676	5	10	29	35	~~PEN~~	~~47~~	32	38	29	35	33	39	204.0	157.0
32	USA	Andy Johnston	Not documented	US 560	~~40~~	~~46~~	30	36	24	30	19	25	38	44	19	25	206.0	160.0
33	USA	Albert Fay	Not documented	US 543	~~44~~	~~50~~	44	50	26	32	28	34	6	11.7	28	34	211.7	161.7
34	USA	Thad Hutcheson	Not documented	US 671	30	36	28	34	23	29	17	23	35	41	~~PEN~~	~~57~~	220.0	163.0
35	USA	Mickey Lowell	Not documented	US 716	21	27	19	25	~~46~~	~~52~~	37	43	31	37	29	35	219.0	167.0
36	USA	Joe Ellis	Not documented	US 632	~~45~~	~~51~~	33	39	35	41	18	24	22	28	32	38	221.0	170.0
37	USA	George Francisco	Not documented	US 641	24	30	32	38	32	38	~~33~~	~~39~~	33	39	20	26	210.0	171.0
38	USA	Tim James	Not documented	US 702	31	37	42	48	40	46	36	42	~~51~~	~~57~~	18	24	254.0	197.0
39	USA	Jack Dollahite	Not documented	US 651	26	32	36	42	38	44	34	40	~~43~~	~~49~~	36	42	249.0	200.0
40	USA	Owen Oakley	Not documented	US 515	29	35	43	49	~~51~~	~~57~~	35	41	40	46	42	48	276.0	219.0
41	USA	Charlie Milby	Not documented	US 581	41	47	31	37	42	48	38	44	~~44~~	~~50~~	40	46	272.0	222.0
42	USA	Sam Claiborn	Not documented	US 585	49	55	41	47	39	45	40	46	34	40	~~DNS~~	~~59~~	292.0	233.0
43	USA	Joe Hoeksema	Not documented	US 25	28	34	49	55	47	53	42	48	39	45	~~DNS~~	~~59~~	294.0	235.0
44	USA	Dick Hockert	Not documented	US 459	23	29	51	57	~~PEN~~	~~67~~	44	50	48	54	44	50	307.0	240.0
45	USA	Barry Overbaugh	Not documented	US 711	34	40	47	53	41	47	48	54	~~49~~	~~55~~	41	47	296.0	241.0
46	USA	Jack Denis	Not documented	US 718	43	49	PEN	58	30	36	47	53	46	52	~~DNS~~	~~59~~	307.0	248.0
47	USA	Tom Dickey	Not documented	US 708	~~46~~	~~52~~	37	43	45	51	46	52	45	51	45	51	300.0	248.0
48	USA	Larry Booth	Not documented	US 720	42	48	38	44	43	49	43	49	~~DNS~~	~~59~~	DNS	59	308.0	249.0
49	USA	Dave Fox	Not documented	US 650	39	45	46	52	48	54	45	51	PEN	49	~~DNS~~	~~59~~	310.0	251.0
50	USA	Phil Roach	Not documented	US 691	50	56	45	51	44	50	50	56	42	48	~~DNS~~	~~59~~	320.0	261.0
51	USA	Joe Deese	Not documented	US 547	51	57	52	58	49	55	~~PEN~~	~~76~~	47	53	46	52	351.0	275.0
52	USA	Peter Seymour	Not documented	US 300	52	58	50	56	50	56	49	55	50	56	~~DNS~~	~~59~~	340.0	281.0

Legend: DNF – Did not finish; DNS – Did not start; DSQ – Disqualified; PMS – Premature start; RET – Retired;
Discard is crossed out and does not count for the overall result.

- 1979 Progress

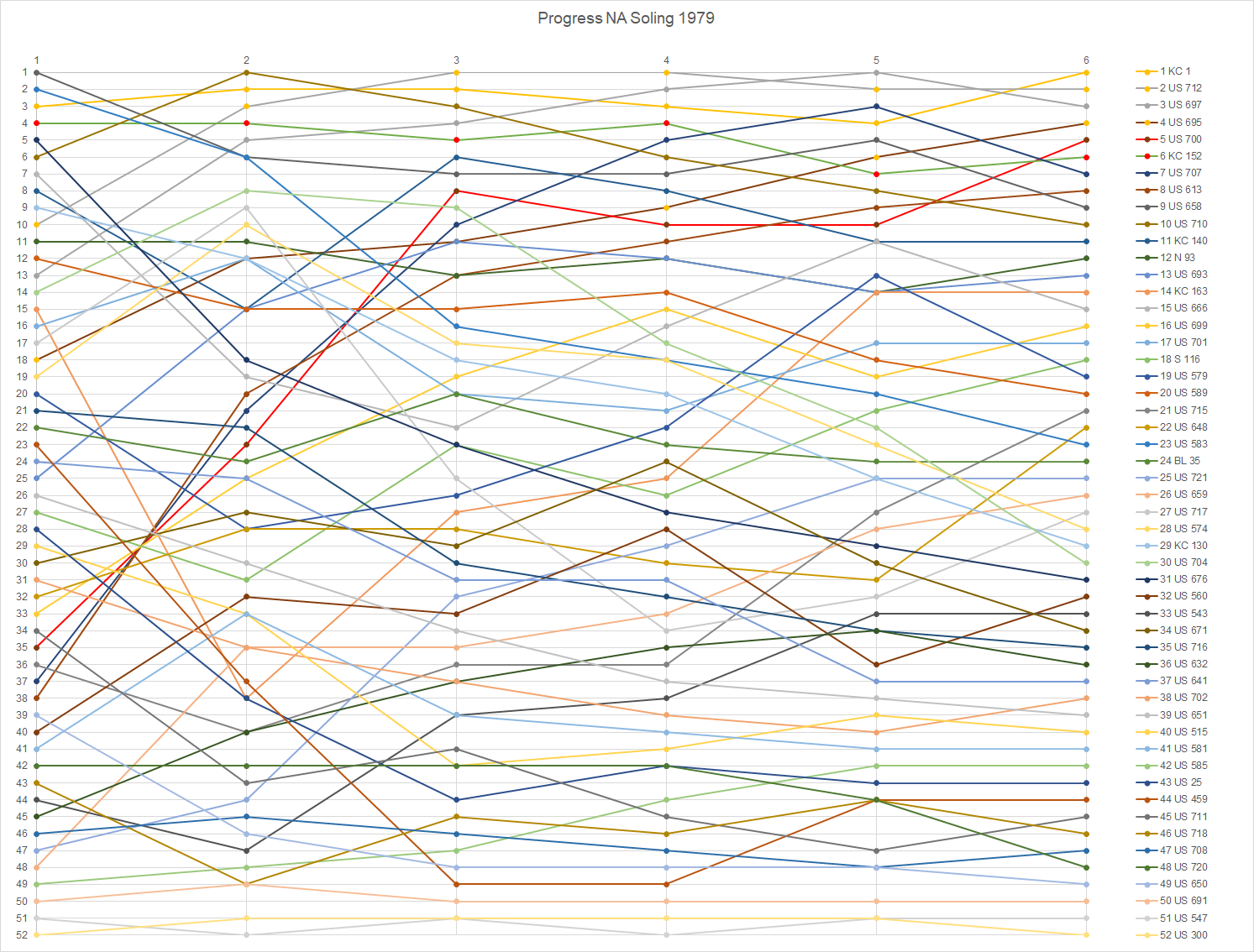

== Further results ==
For further results see:

- Soling North American Championship results (1969–79)
- Soling North American Championship results (1980–89)
- Soling North American Championship results (1990–99)
- Soling North American Championship results (2000–09)
- Soling North American Championship results (2010–19)
- Soling North American Championship results (2020–29)
