= Charlie Kamps =

American sailor and lawyer

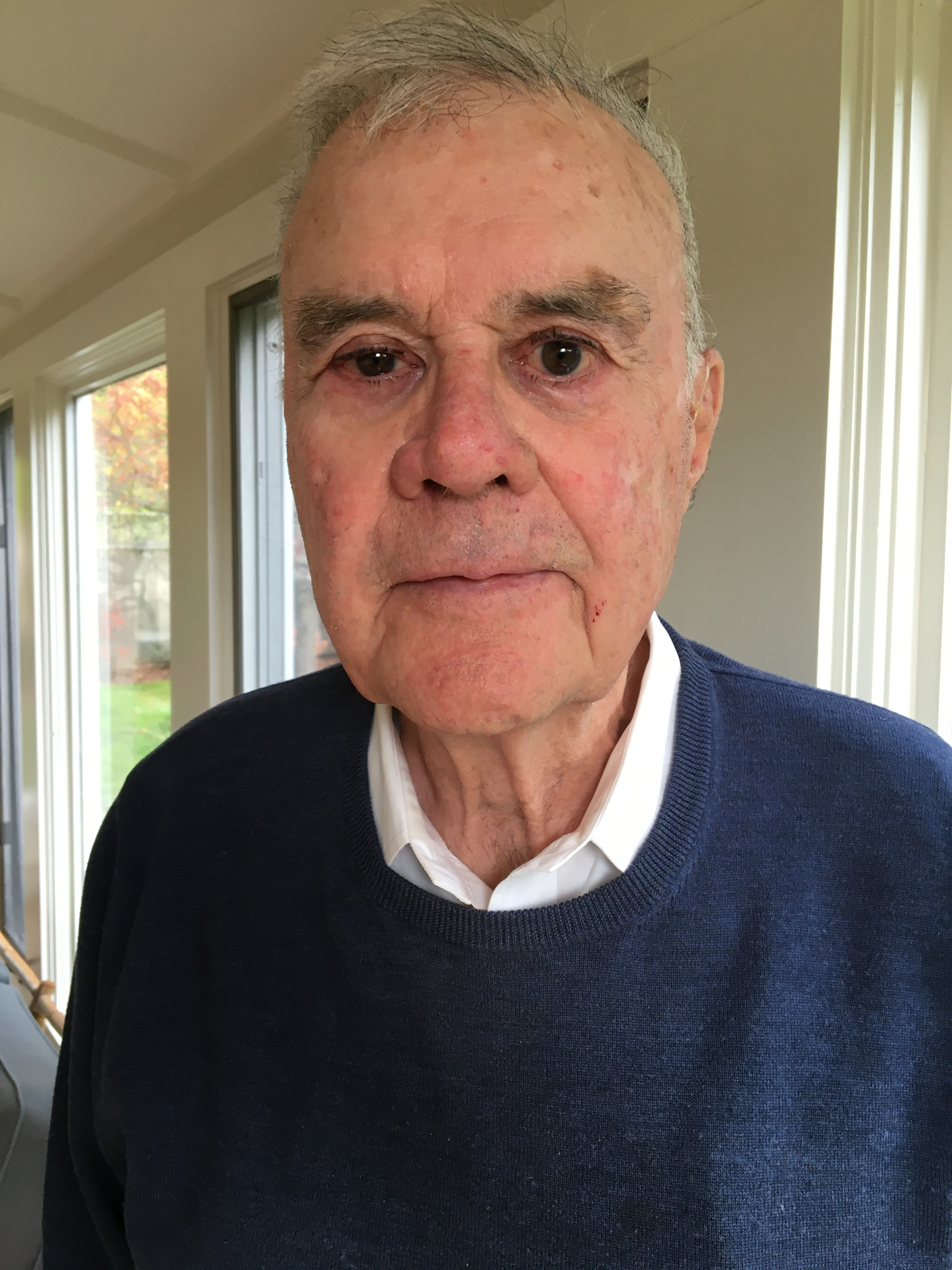

Personal information
- Full name: Charles Q. Kamps
- Nationality: American
- Born: 21 March 1932 (age 94) Milwaukee, Wisconsin

Sailing career
- Sport: Sailing
- College team: Marquette University
- Club: Milwaukee Yacht Club
- Class: Soling
Medal record
Sailing
Representing United States
European Championships
Bronze medal – third place	2013 Castiglione della Pescaia	Soling
North American Championships
Silver medal – second place	2002 Wilmette	Soling
Bronze medal – third place	1979 Galveston Bay	Soling
Bronze medal – third place	2004 Milwaukee	Soling
Bronze medal – third place	2006 Milwaukee	Soling,

Charles "Charlie" Q. Kamps (born March 21, 1932, in Milwaukee, Wisconsin) is an American sailor and lawyer. As sailor he competed in many Soling World, European and North American Championships since the creation of the Soling class (1969).

== Sailing career ==
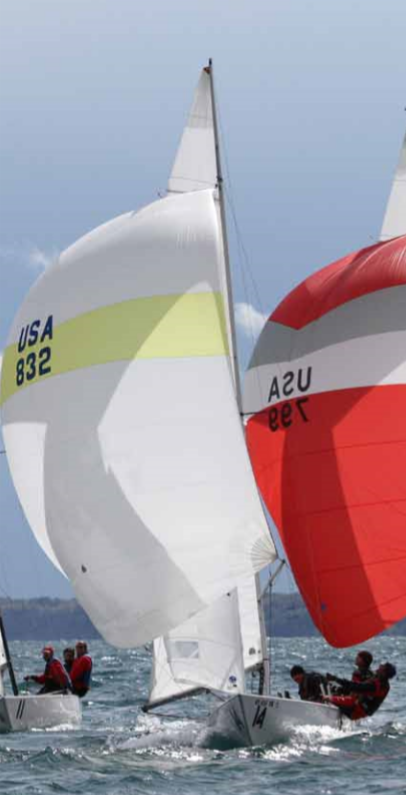
Charlie Kamps in his latest Soling USA 832

Kamps is since the early day's of the Soling strongly involved with the class. He served for many years in the executive committee of the International Soling Association. As sailor he took many times the podium. Charlie competed over 20 times in the Soling North American Championship.

The 1979 edition of the Soling North American Championship had a long aftermath. In race 5, Kamps (US 697) was penalized with a 50% bonus as result of a protest from Mac Dunwoody (US 574), Houston. Kamps made several appeals what resulted in a reinstatement of Kamps and a penalty of 50% bonus for Mac Dunwoody on 5 February 1981. This decision was made by the TYA Appeals Committee.

== Personal life ==
Kamps and his wife, Mary, have two children. Kamps is a retired partner with Quarles & Brady LLP.

== Publications ==
Kamps is author/co-author of:

- "Dealing With the Agencies," Quarles & Brady Clean Air Act program, 1990
- "DNR Compliance and Other Environmental Considerations," Quarles & Brady program, 1988
