= Heart of America (yacht) =

Racing yacht

- Yacht club: Chicago Yacht Club
- Nation: United States
- Class: 12-metre
- Sail no: US–51
- Designer(s): Gretzky, MacLane, Graham & Schlageter
- Builder: Merrifield-Roberts
- Launched: 1986

Racing career
- Skippers: Buddy Melges
- AC Challenger Selection Series: 1987

Heart of America is a 12-metre class yacht that competed in the 1987 Louis Vuitton Cup. The boat was helmed by Buddy Melges and represented the Chicago Yacht Club. The boat finished 8 of 13 in Louis Vuitton Cup, which decides the challenger to the Cup holder.

The Chicago-based yacht design firm of Graham & Schlageter contributed to the boat's design.

== Crew ==
The crew included these members, as well as others.

- Buddy Melges - Skipper
- David Dellenbaugh - Tactician
- Larry Mialik - Grinder
- Richie Stearns - main trimmer and sail co-coordinator
- Andreas Josenhans - Trimmer
- Dave Navin
- Jim Gretzky
- Wally Henry
- Fred Stritt
- John Stanley

John Spence

== Support ==
The CEOs of the Heart of America Cup effort included Alan Johnston and William Bentsen.

Corporate sponsorship of the drive started with MCI providing $1M US dollars to the campaign.

== Controversies ==
The challenge by a Great Lakes yacht club resulted in the Australian Royal Perth Yacht club challenging whether Lake Michigan was an "arm of the sea" as required by the Deed of Gift of the America's Cup. The court decided that Lake Michigan did constitute an "arm of the sea" and that the Club could challenge for the America's Cup.
