= Mark LeBlanc =

American sailor (1950–2019)

Personal information
- Full name: Mark Allan Hoâ LeBlanc
- Nationality: American
- Born: June 29, 1950 Louisiana
- Died: November 1, 2019 (aged 69)

Sailing career
- Sport: Sailing
- Club: Southern Yacht Club
- Class: Soling
Medal record
Sailing
Representing United States
World Championships
Silver medal – second place	1970 Poole	Soling
North American Championships
Gold medal – first place	1969 Milwaukee	Soling

Mark Allan Hoâ LeBlanc (June 29, 1950 – November 1, 2019) was an American sailor. He was part of the team that won the Sears Cup in 1967. Together with John Dane III and John Cerise, he won the first Soling North American Championship 1969, Milwaukee. The same team became silver medallists in the 1970 Soling World championship held in Poole, UK.

LeBlanc fathered sailor Mark Edward LeBlanc, who came in 6th at the 2012 Summer Paralympics.
