= Tom Dickey =

American sport sailor (1946–2019)

Personal information
- Born: 9 July 1946
- Died: January 24, 2019 (aged 72)

Sailing career
- Sport: Sailing
- Club: Texas Corinthian Yacht Club, Fort Worth Boat Club
- Classes: Soling, Sailfish, 5.5 Metre
Medal record
Sailing
Representing United States
Soling World Championship
Gold medal – first place	1971 Oyster Bay, New York	Soling
5.5 Metre World Championship
Silver medal – second place	1989 Houston	5.5 Metre
Silver medal – second place	1990 Torquay	5.5 Metre
Silver medal – second place	1992 Nassau	5.5 Metre
North American Championships
Gold medal – first place	1971 Marina Del Rey	Soling

Tom Dickey was an American sailor. In 1971 Dickey together with helmsman Robert Mosbacher, and Thad Hutcheson won the Soling Gulf Coast Regionals, then the Soling North American Championship, and the Soling World Championship.
