= Carl Buchan =

Carl Buchan may refer to:

- William Carl Buchan (born 1956), American Olympic sailor
- H. Carl Buchan (1916–1960), American World War II veteran and co-founder of the American home improvement company Lowe's
