= Gordon Lindemann =

American sailor

Personal information
- Full name: Gordon I. Lindemann
- Born: 1921
- Died: June 10, 2017 (aged 95–96) Milwaukee, Wisconsin, U.S.

Sailing career
- Sport: Sailing
Medal record
Sailing
Representing United States
World Championships
Gold medal – first place	1967 Nassau, Bahamas	5.5 Metre
North American Championships
Bronze medal – third place	1969 Milwaukee	Soling

Gordon Lindemann (1921 – June 10, 2017) was an American sailor, In 1967, he was the 5.5 Metre World Champion. Along the way there were many Soling victories, including Kiel Week.

In the early days of the Soling class Lindeman, the head of the United States Soling Association (U.S.S.A.) technical committee, worked out the details for Soling builders to insure that each hull conforms to the same rigid standard all over the world.
