= John Anderson (sailor) =

Australian sailor

Personal information
- Full name: John Edward Anderson
- Nationality: Australian
- Born: 24 July 1939 (age 86) Sydney, New South Wales
- Height: 183 cm (6 ft 0 in)
- Weight: 89 kg (196 lb)

Sailing career
- Sport: Sailing
- Class(es): Star, Soling
Medal record
Sailing
Representing Australia
Olympic Games
Gold medal – first place	1972 Kiel	Star
North American Championships
Gold medal – first place	1975 Rochester	Soling

John Edward Anderson OAM (born 24 July 1939) is an Australian sailor and Olympic champion. He competed at the 1972 Summer Olympics in Munich, where he won a gold medal in the Star class, together with David Forbes. He is the twin brother of sailor Tom Anderson.

In 1975, Anderson was part of the winning Soling class crew in the North American Championship and that same year, won the pre Olympic Regatta at Kingston. At the 1976 Montreal Olympics, he crewed the Australian boat which finished eleventh in the soling class. He was a member of the Australian Admirals Cup Team on Apollo II (1973), Love and War (1975), and Runnaway (1977). On 26 January 1987, Anderson was awarded the Medal of Order of Australia in "recognition of service to sailing". Anderson was inducted into the Sport Australia Hall of Fame in 1999.

On 14 July 2000, Anderson was awarded the Australian Sports Medal for "services to sailing, particularly youth and offshore". In 2009 Anderson was inducted into the Queensland Sport Hall of Fame.
