= John Dane III =

American sailor (born 1950)

Personal information
- Born: July 15, 1950 (age 75) New Orleans, Louisiana U.S.

Sailing career
- Sport: Sailing
Medal record
Sailing
Representing United States
World Championships
| Silver medal – second place | 1970 Poole | Soling |
North American Championships
| Gold medal – first place | 1969 Milwaukee | Soling |

John Dane III (born July 15, 1950) is an American Olympic sailor in the Star class. He competed in the 2008 Summer Olympics, where he finished 11th together with his son-in-law Austin Sperry. Dane almost made the Olympics in the dragon in 1968, when he took second place at the US Olympic trials in a borrowed boat. He also sailed the trials in the Soling (1972), Finn (1976) and Star (1984) classes.

Dane, together with Mark LeBlanc and John Cerise, was the winner of the first North American Championship Soling in Milwaukee back in 1969. This team also took the second place in the Soling World Championship of 1970 in Poole, UK.

He is the former president of Trinity Marine Group and also former president and CEO of Trinity Yachts, LLC.
