= David Forbes (sailor) =

Australian sailor (1934–2022)

Personal information
- Full name: David John Oliver Forbes
- Nationality: Australian
- Born: 26 January 1934
- Died: 21 May 2022 (aged 88) Sydney, Australia
- Height: 185 cm (6 ft 1 in)
- Weight: 100 kg (220 lb)

Sailing career
- Sport: Sailing
- Class(es): Star, Soling, 5.5 Metre
Medal record
Sailing
Representing Australia
Olympic Games
Gold medal – first place	1972 Kiel	Star
World Championships
Gold medal – first place	1970 Sydney	5.5 Metre
Silver medal – second place	1971 Seawanhaka	5.5 Metre
North American Championships
Gold medal – first place	1975 Rochester	Soling

David John Oliver Forbes OAM (26 January 1934 – 21 May 2022) was an Australian sailor who competed for his country at three Olympics from 1968 to 1976. Forbes won an Olympic gold medal in the Star Class at Munich 1972 alongside John Anderson OAM. His sailing career spanned over 20 years and included a 5.5m World Championship in 1970, a Sydney to Hobart race in 1974, and ten Australian championships in the Star, 5.5m, Soling, and Etchells classes. He represented Australia at three Olympic Games – 1968 Mexico City, 1972 Munich, and 1976 Montreal, and was a member of two America’s Cup challenges. He was a part of the ‘Gretel II’ crew in the 1970 America’s Cup and was relief helmsman in the 1977 America’s Cup.

John Bertrand AO says of Forbes: “He was the most naturally gifted sailor I ever met. His career both in sport and business is one of celebration. He was an Olympic gold medalist in 1972 when there was no coaching and very limited support, he took on the world’s best and got the job done.”

== Early life ==
Forbes attended Newington College from 1943 to 1949.

== Sailing ==
He was the helmsman of the Australian boat in the Star class at the 1968 Mexico City Olympics, where it finished eighth, and at the 1972 Munich Olympics, where he won a gold medal with John Anderson OAM. In 1975, Forbes was part of the winning Soling team in the North American Championship and that same year, won the pre-Olympic Regatta at Kingston. At the 1976 Montreal Olympics, he helmed the Australian boat which finished eleventh in the Soling class. Forbes was also the mainsheet hand on the 1970 America's Cup challenger Gretel II.

== Business ==
Forbes business career was spent building the soft drink company Shelley Ecks, which developed many modern in-house technologies and was eventually sold to Coca-Cola.

== Honours ==
Forbes was inducted into the Sport Australia Hall of Fame in 1988, and in 2000 he received an Australian Sports Medal. In the Australia Day Honours List of 2015, Forbes was made an OAM for service to yachting. In 2018 Forbes and Anderson were inducted to the Australian Sailing Hall of Fame.
