= Richie Stearns =

American sailor (born 1955)

Rich Stearns
Personal information
- Nationality: American

Sailing career
- Sport: Sailing
- Club: Sheridan Shore Yacht Club
- Class: Soling
Medal record
Sailing
Representing United States
North American Championships
Silver medal – second place	1969 Milwaukee	Soling

Rich Stearns is an American sailor. He became second the 1969 Soling North American Championship together with his father, Richard Stearns, and Bruce Goldsmith. Stearns did 3 Olympic campaigns in the Soling, won the Soling Great Lakes championship and was main trimmer and sail co-coordinator during the Americas Cup Campaign Heart of America.

== Publications ==
Stearns published, with Adam Cort, ASIN B00BPO7FGM, Getting Started in Sailboat Racing (April 23rd 2013), ISBN 9780071808262.
