= Denis O'Neil =

Australian sailor

Personal information
- Full name: Denis O'Neil
- Nationality: Australian
- Born: 11 February 1936 (age 90)
- Height: 178 cm (5 ft 10 in)
- Weight: 81 kg (179 lb)

Sailing career
- Sport: Sailing
- Class: Soling
Medal record
Representing Australia
North American Championships
Gold medal – first place	1975 Rochester	Soling

Denis O'Neil (born 11 February 1936) is a sailor from Australia. O'Neil represented his country at the 1972 Summer Olympics in Kiel. O'Neil took 16th place in the Soling with Robert Miller as helmsman and Ken Berkeley as fellow crew member. In 1975, O'Neil was part of the winning Soling team in the North American Championship and that same year, won the pre Olympic Regatta at Kingston. At the 1976 Montreal Olympics, he crewed in the Australian boat which finished eleventh in the soling class.
