= Jack Van Dyke =

Sailor from the United States

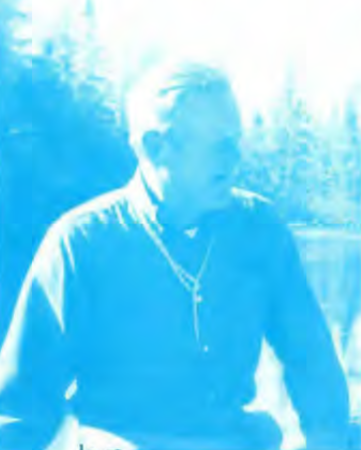

Personal information
- Nationality: United States
- Born: 1912 Wisconsin
- Died: 1991 (aged 78–79)

Sailing career
- Sport: Sailing
- College team: Princeton University graduated in 1934
- Club: Milwaukee Yacht Club
- Class(es): A-Scow, Pup, E-Scow, Ice boating, Star, International 210, 5.5 Metre and Soling
Medal record
Representing United States
North American Championships
Gold medal – first place	1954 Rockport	Star
- Updated on 24 March 2020

Jack Van Dyke (born in 1912, died in 1991) was a sailor from the Wisconsin, United States, who became the second president of the International Soling Association (1973 - 1975).

Van Dyke started his sailing career in 1917 as a 5-year old bilge sailor on his father's A-Scow. From that time on he sailed whenever possible. After WOII he became attracted to sailing in the Star. In 1954 he became North American Champion in that class. When he was sailing 5.5 Metre in 1968 he became interested in the new International Soling class and soon he became an Soling sailor. In February 1971 he stepped into the executive committee of the ISA. During his term as president he accomplished the following:

- A completely new Constitution for the ISA
- Yearly revisions and improvements to the class and measurement rules in order to maintain the one-design character of the Soling
- New championship rules for the Worlds and European and other Continental Championships
- The regulair publication of Soling Sailing, the magazine of the ISA.

Van Dyke graduated from Princeton University in 1934.

Sporting positions
Preceded by (Denmark) Eggert Benzon	President International Soling Association; 1973 - 1975	Succeeded by (Netherlands) Geert Bakker
