= H. Carl Buchan =

American World War II veteran and founder of Lowe's

- Born: Henry Carl Buchan Jr. November 27, 1916; Pinehurst, North Carolina, U.S.
- Died: October 22, 1960 (age 44); Glade Valley, North Carolina, U.S.
- Resting place: Mountlawn Memorial Park, North Wilkesboro, North Carolina, U.S.
- Occupation: Business
- Known for: Co-founder of Lowe's

Carl Buchan, or H. Carl Buchan Jr., was an American World War II veteran. He is noted as one of the co-founders of the American home improvement and retail company, Lowe's. Although his father-in-law, Lucius Lowe, started Lowe's in 1921 as a small hardware store, Buchan is credited for significantly expanding it when he became the owner of the business in 1952.

== Biography ==
Buchan was born on November 27, 1916, in Pinehurst, North Carolina.

He went to State College (North Carolina State University) to study journalism. After the outbreak of World War II, he enlisted in the military and completed his training at the Officer's Training School in Camp Lee, Virginia.

After Lowe's death, his daughter Ruth inherited his hardware store, which was then called Lowe's North Wilkesboro Hardware. She sold it to her brother, Jim Lowe. Ruth, however, was called in to manage the store together with her mother after her brother left to fight during World War II. Buchan also served during the war, but due to an accident, he was sent home. An account stated that this involved a foot injury. He then met Ruth, and the pair got married.

The couple reached out to Jim, who was still fighting in Europe, to ask if they could bring Buchan into the business. Jim agreed on one condition: that a store inventory was to be conducted and Buchan would pay him for each product in the list. This gentleman's agreement is said to have sealed Jim and Buchan's partnership. The Buchans moved to Wilkesboro during the 1940s to co-manage the store with Jim after he came home. In 1952, after differences with Jim, Buchan bought the business out and became sole owner of Lowe's Hardware.

Buchan's vision for Lowe's was ambitious early on. He wanted to transform it into a chain of hardware stores. Among the innovations he introduced was the Lowe's Companies Profit Sharing Plan and Trust, which allowed employees partial ownership of the company. By 1960, the company was operating 13 stores that sold hardware, home appliances, and lumber at a discount.

Buchan died in 1960 from a heart attack.
