= Roger Welsh =

American football coach (born c. 1941)

Biographical details
- Born: c. 1941 or 1942 (age 84–85); Grandview Heights, Ohio, U.S.
- Education: Muskingum College (1964)

Playing career

Football
- 1960–1963: Muskingum

Baseball
- 1960–1963: Muskingum
- Positions: Safety, punter (football); Second baseman (baseball)

Coaching career (HC unless noted)

Football
- 1964–1965: Ohio (GA)
- 1966: Van Wert HS (OH) (assistant)
- 1967–1974: Wooster (DL)
- 1975–1985: Capital (DC)
- 1986–1996: Capital

Baseball
- 1966: Van Wert HS (OH)
- 1967–1974: Wooster
- 1975–1986: Capital

Administrative career (AD unless noted)
- ?–2007: Capital

Head coaching record
- Overall: 41–65–4 (college football); 238–251–2 (college baseball)
- Tournaments: Football; 0–1 (NCAA D-III playoffs)

Accomplishments and honors

Championships
- Football; 1 OAC (1987)

Awards
- Football; OAC Coach of the Year (1987); Muskingum Hall of Fame (1996); Capital Hall of Fame (2010)

Roger Blair Welsh (born c. 1941 or 1942) is an American former college football coach. He was the head football coach for Capital University from 1986 to 1996.

== Playing career ==
Welsh grew up in Grandview Heights, Ohio. He attended Muskingum and played for the football and baseball team. He served as a safety and the punter for the football team and was a second baseman for the baseball team.

== Coaching career ==
In 1964, Welsh served as a graduate assistant for Ohio as he worked on his master's degree. In 1966, he served as an assistant coach for Van Wert High School. In 1967, he was hired as the defensive line coach for Wooster. In 1975, he was hired as the defensive coordinator for Capital under head coach Gene Slaughter. Welsh was named Slaughter's successor prior to the 1986 season. In eleven seasons as head coach he finished with a 41–65–4 record. His best season came in 1987 as he led the Crusaders to their first out-right Ohio Athletic Conference (OAC) title, a 7–2–2 record, and made their first appearance in the NCAA Division III playoffs. He was also named OAC Coach of the Year in 1987. He resigned following the 1996 season.

Welsh served as the head baseball coach for Van Wert High School in 1966. From 1967 to 1974 he was the head coach for Wooster. He won 84 games as Wooster's head coach. From 1975 to 1986 he served as the head coach for Capital.

Welsh also served as the athletic director and retired in 2007.

== Honors ==
In 1996, Welsh was inducted into the Muskingum Hall of Fame. In 2010, he was inducted into the Capital Hall of Fame.

== Head coaching record ==
=== College football ===
Year	Team	Overall	Conference	Standing	Bowl/playoffs
Capital Crusaders (Ohio Athletic Conference) (1986–1996)
1986	Capital	4–5	3–5	T–6th	
1987	Capital	7–2–2	6–1–1	1st	L NCAA Division III First Round
1988	Capital	6–4	4–4	5th	
1989	Capital	1–9	0–8	9th	
1990	Capital	6–4	5–4	4th	
1991	Capital	6–3–1	5–3–1	5th	
1992	Capital	2–7–1	1–7–1	9th	
1993	Capital	5–5	4–5	6th	
1994	Capital	2–8	2–7	T–8th	
1995	Capital	1–9	1–8	9th	
1996	Capital	1–9	0–9	10th	
Capital:		41–65–4	31–61–3		
Total:		41–65–4			
National championship Conference title Conference division title or championship game berth
