= John Rousmaniere =

American author and sailor (1944–2026)

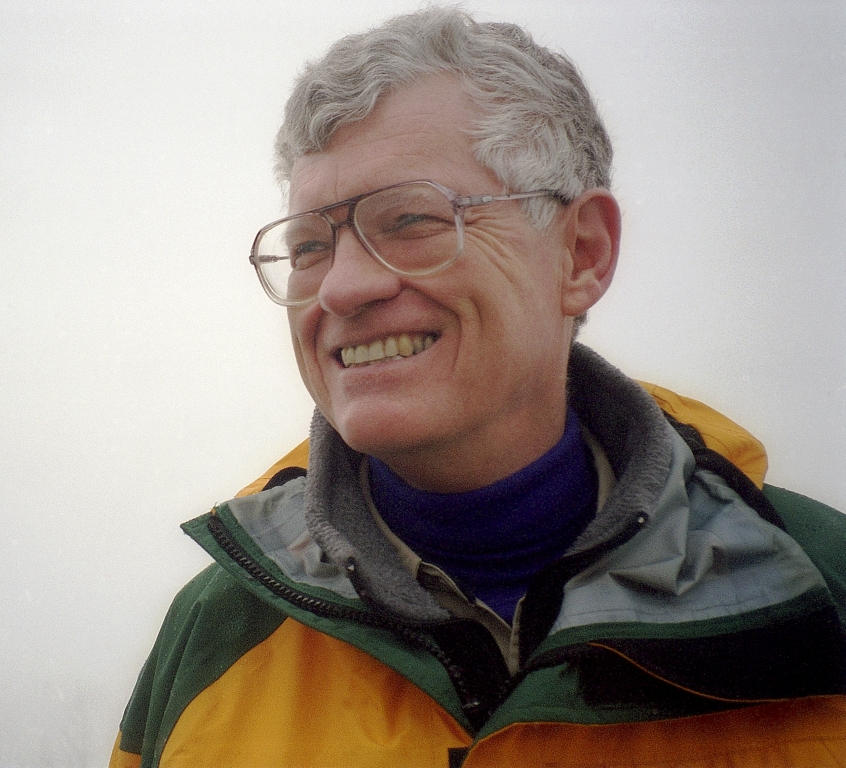
- Born: March 10, 1944; Louisville, Kentucky, U.S.
- Died: August 8, 2026 (aged 82); Westwood, Massachusetts, U.S.
- Education: Columbia University; Union Theological Seminary
- Occupations: Author, editor, historian
- Known for: Sailing, yachting, and historical writing

John Pierce Rousmaniere (March 10, 1944 – August 8, 2026) was an American writer and author of 30 historical, technical, and instructional books on sailing, yachting history, New York history, business history, and the histories of clubs, businesses, and other organizations. An authority on seamanship and boating safety, he conducted tests of equipment and sailing skills and led or participated in fact-finding inquiries into boating accidents. He had been presented with several awards for his writing and his contributions to boating safety and seamanship.

== Early life and education ==
John Pierce Rousmaniere (pronounced "Room-an-ear") was the oldest of the eight children of the late James Ayer Rousmaniere, of Boston and New York, and of the late Jessie Broaddus Pierce Rousmaniere, of Louisville and Brownsville, Texas, the daughter of a U.S. Army general and a cousin of Mayor Andrew Broaddus, who integrated Louisville's parks in the 1950s. He is a descendant of a Frenchman who fought for the American side in the American Revolution, of the Easton family that co-founded Newport, Rhode Island, and of pioneer settlers in Brownsville, Texas. He spent his early years in Cincinnati, Ohio, and at age 11 moved with his family to Oyster Bay, on Long Island, New York. He was an alumnus of the Episcopalian-affiliated St. Paul's School, Concord, New Hampshire (1962); Columbia University (BS 1967, M.A. 1968); and Union Theological Seminary in the City of New York (M.Div., 1988).

== Professional career ==
After U.S. Army service as an Infantry OCS-trained, Airborne-qualified officer and Assistant Professor of History at the U.S. Military Academy at West Point, Rousmaniere was an editor at Yachting and Natural History magazines before becoming a freelance writer in 1978. He worked in New York City and his home in Stamford, Conn., where he raised his two sons, before moving to Manhattan in 2005.

Rousmaniere wrote on a wide range of topics but may be best known for his books on storms at sea, boating safety, yachting history, and sailing instruction. His sailing manual, The Annapolis Book of Seamanship (Simon & Schuster), has gone through four editions since its initial publication in 1983. The revised and updated fourth edition was published in January 2014. A video series of the same title is based on the book. Rousmeniere's Fastnet, Force 10 (W.W. Norton, 1980) is his first-person account of sailing in the tragic 1979 Fastnet Race, in which 15 sailors died. Published in several languages and still in print in 2016, this was the first of his two storm books. It was followed in 2002 by After the Storm: True Stories of Disaster and Recovery at Sea, about the causes and consequences of storms at sea as seen through biographies of sailors and seamen, stories of gales and wrecks, and Rousmaniere's own experiences. His experiences in and about the Fastnet Race storm led him to attend Union Theological Seminary, where he earned the Master of Divinity degree in 1988 and met his wife, Leath Ruth Robinson.

He sailed more than 40,000 miles, including nine Newport Bermuda Races (two in the second-place boat), two Fastnet Races, three transatlantic races or cruises, other long races or cruises, and extensive day races that included winning championships. His sailing experience, and his writing about the 1979 Fastnet storm, led Rousmaniere to organize or participate in more than 100 safety at sea or seamanship events, including tests of equipment and studies of accidents, as well as safety-at-sea seminars under the aegis of the U.S. Sailing Association (US SAILING) or North U (the educational arm of North Sails). In 2010–16, he spoke at or moderated more than 20 safety seminars or related events: for the Transpac Race, Marion Bermuda Cruising Yacht Race, Isla Mujeres Race, U.S. Naval Academy Safety at Sea Seminar, Sailing Foundation in Seattle Safety at Sea Seminar, Chicago Strictly Sail Boat Show, Newport Bermuda Race and other venues. He retired as a safety seminar moderator in 2016 and continued to make presentations, for example at the 2018 Newport Bermuda Race safety seminar.

Rousmaniere co-organized the Crew Overboard Rescue Seminar at Sausalito, Cal., in 2005 and wrote its final report recommending rescue equipment and skills. He later served as coordinator of the Hanson Rescue Medal Award presented by US SAILING.

In 2011 he served on Independent Review Panels in US Sailing Association inquiries into two fatal sailing accidents, one involving the death of a young sailor in a 420 dinghy at Annapolis, Md., and the other the deaths of two sailors in the Chicago Yacht Club's race to Mackinac Island, on Lake Michigan. The reports are available on the US Sailing website. In 2012 he conducted a review of an incident in the 2012 Newport Bermuda Race, and also wrote the report on tests of sailor retrieval, capsize recovery, and entrapment that were held in California and New York.

He wrote a number of history books on a broad range of topics that include the America's Cup, ocean racing, yacht clubs and other clubs, New York history, business history, and the history of yachting. He has also written about maritime photography (Sleek and A Picture History of the America's Cup). For many years he was Consulting Editor of The Dolphin Book Club, the maritime division of the Book of the Month Club. His book reviews have appeared in "WoodenBoat," "Cruising World", "Sea History," and other publications.

Rousmaniere frequently lectured on maritime history and New York history at historical associations, yacht clubs, and other venues. Beginning in 2012, he led a monthly book discussion group concerning publications on maritime topics, meeting in the New York Yacht Club library.

His non-boating books include histories of the law firm of Davis Polk & Wardwell, the Equitable Life Assurance Society, the Union League Club of New York, and Piping Rock Country Club. Rousmaniere's writings about New York City include a history of settlement houses (his Columbia M.A. thesis). His Green Oasis in Brooklyn is an illustrated history of a large, classic 170-year-old cemetery on the Brooklyn-Queens border. He contributed 40 essays to the 2nd edition (2010) edition of The Encyclopedia of New York City. He is a former trustee of The Evergreens Cemetery Preservation Foundation.

Books he edited include All This and Sailing, Too, the autobiography of the yacht designer Olin J. Stephens II, (Mystic Seaport, 1999);, as well as Dennis Conner's autobiography No Excuse to Lose; The Enduring Great Lakes, on the ecology of the Great Lakes; Desirable and Undesirable Characteristics of Offshore Yachts; and Michael Levitt, Herding Tigers: The North Sails Story (North Sails, 2009).

In television and video, Rousmaniere wrote the scripts for several sailing shows produced by Gary Jobson for ESPN and other outlets. In 2002–03 he was the writer for the Outdoor Life Network's coverage of the Louis Vuitton Cup runup to the America's Cup match in Auckland, New Zealand. In 2007 he was a commentator on the America's Cup match at Valencia, Spain, on a Silversea Cruise Line ship. He was interviewed for several historical documentaries and was co-writer of a documentary on the Beatles, The Compleat Beatles.

He was media chair for the 2010, 2012, 2014, and 2016 Newport Bermuda Races, writing and editing daily coverage of the race for its website, www.BermudaRace.com/, and for the international press.

Rousmaniere wrote monthly columns on seamanship for Sailing World magazine and the online publication SailNet. He contributed to Cruising World, Sail, Scuttlebutt, Sail World, and other web and print publications and has been interviewed on NPR and in print publications.

Encyclopedias to which he contributed include The Oxford Encyclopedia of Maritime History, The Encyclopedia of Yacht Designers, The Oxford Companion to Ships and the Sea, and The Encyclopedia of New York City.

His memberships include the Century Association, Cruising Club of America, New York Yacht Club, Indian Harbor Yacht Club, and the Authors Guild. He chaired the New York Yacht Club's Library Committee and served on the Bermuda Race Organizing Committee, the Selection Committees of the National Sailing Hall of Fame and the America's Cup Hall of Fame, and the Safety at Sea Committees of the Cruising Club of America and U.S. Sailing. As a member of the executive committee of the U.S. Olympic Yachting Committee from 1977 to 1984, he chaired the 1980 Sailing Olympic Trials.

Besides teaching history at the U.S. Military Academy, Rousmaniere taught writing at the College of New Rochelle, Union Theological Seminary, and the Davis Polk & Wardwell law firm.

== Personal life and death ==
Rousmaniere lived in Manhattan with his wife, Leah Ruth Robinson Rousmaniere, a development officer, mystery novelist, historian of tea, and the author of the history of the Seamen's Church Institute of New York and New Jersey. He died in Westwood, Massachusetts on August 8, 2026, at the age of 82, from Alzheimer's disease.

== Awards ==
In April 2009 the Cruising Club of America awarded John Rousmaniere its Richard S. Nye Trophy for meritorious service: "His books have been a source of information and inspiration to sailors around the world. He has also served the sport of sailing as a moderator at Safety at Sea Seminars, as a lecturer, and researcher on man overboard recovery techniques."

In October 2013 the United States Sailing Association (US Sailing) presented John Rousmaniere its Timothea Larr Award, which recognizes "a person whose vision and guidance have made an outstanding contribution to the advancement of sailor education in the United States." The citation highlighted his Annapolis Book of Seamanship and other books, the many safety and seamanship seminars and related events he has moderated or spoken at and his reviews of boating accidents.

In January 2014 Mystic Seaport presented John Rousmaniere its W.P. Stephens Award, which recognizes "a significant and enduring contribution to the history, preservation, progress, understanding, or appreciation of American yachting and boating." Said Mystic Seaport President Steve White, "There are very few people with even a passing interest in boating or yachting who have not picked up a book written by John. His intuitive sense and passion for the subject matter makes sailing come alive on the page because he has lived that life."

In November 2014 the New York Yacht Club presented John Rousmaniere its first Henry H. Anderson Award for Volunteerism.

In March 2016 the Atlantic Class Association presented him with its Annie Award in recognition of his book about the Atlantic.

Elected to the National Sailing Hall of Fame, June 2020

Rousmaniere was inducted into the Bermuda Race Roll of Honour in October 2024.

== Publications ==
=== Books ===
==== 1970s ====
- 1976 – A Glossary of Modern Sailing Terms. New York City: Dodd, Mead. ISBN 0-396-07006-X.
- 1978 – Conner, Dennis, and John Rousmaniere. No Excuse to Lose: Winning Yacht Races with Dennis Conner. New York: Norton. ISBN 0-393-03212-4.
- 1979 – The Enduring Great Lakes. John Rousmaniere, ed. New York: Norton. ISBN 0-393-01194-1.

==== 1980s ====
- 1980 – Fastnet, Force 10. New York: Norton. ISBN 0-393-03256-6.
- 1981 – The Luxury Yachts. Alexandria, Va.: Time-Life Books. ISBN 0-8094-2742-7.
- 1983 – America's Cup Book, 1851–1983. New York: Norton. ISBN 0-393-03293-0.
- 1983 – The Annapolis Book of Seamanship. New York: Simon & Schuster. ISBN 0-671-24687-9.
- 1985 – The Sailing Lifestyle: A Guide to Sailing and Cruising for Pleasure. New York: Simon & Schuster. ISBN 0-671-50887-3.
- 1986 – The Golden Pastime: A New History of Yachting. New York: Norton. ISBN 0-393-03317-1.
- 1986 – The Low Black Schooner: Yacht America, 1851–1945: A New History of the Yacht America Based on the Exhibit Held at Mystic Seaport Museum, November 1986 through March 1987, Cosponsored by the New York Yacht Club. Mystic, Conn.: Mystic Seaport. ISBN 0-939510-04-9.
- 1987 – Desirable and Undesirable Characteristics of Offshore Yachts. John Rousmaniere, ed. New York: Norton. ISBN 0-393-03311-2.
- 1987 – The Norton Sailor's Log. New York: Norton. ISBN 0-393-30429-9.
- 1989 – The Annapolis Book of Seamanship. 2nd rev. ed. New York: Simon & Schuster. ISBN 0-671-67447-1.
- 1989 – A Glossary of Modern Sailing Terms. Rev. and updated. New York: Putnam. ISBN 0-399-15005-6.
- 1989 – A Picture History of the America's Cup. New York: Norton. ISBN 978-0-393-02819-5.

==== 1990s ====
- 1991 – A Bridge to Dialogue: A Story of Jewish-Christian Relations. New York: Paulist Press. ISBN 0-8091-3284-2.
- 1995 – The Life and Times of the Equitable. New York: Equitable Companies, Inc. ISBN 0-9648761-2-4.
- 1997 – The Norton Boater's Log: An Innovative Log, Boat's Data Manual, & Guest Register: With Quick-reference Guides to Safety, Regulations, & Flag Etiquette. Rev. 2nd ed. New York: Norton. ISBN 0-393-31660-2.
- 1998 – The Illustrated Dictionary of Boating Terms: 2,000 Essential Terms for Sailors & Powerboaters. New York: Norton. ISBN 0-393-04649-4.
- 1999 – The Annapolis Book of Seamanship. 3rd rev. ed. New York: Simon & Schuster. ISBN 0-684-85420-1.

==== 2000s ====
- 2000 – Fastnet, Force 10 (with new introduction). New York: Norton. ISBN 0-393-30865-0.
- 2001 – The Clubhouse at Sea. New York: New York Yacht Club. OCLC 53334902
- 2002 – After the Storm: True Stories of Disaster and Recovery at Sea. Camden, Maine: International Marine/McGraw-Hill. ISBN 0-07-137795-6.
- 2003 – Sleek: Classic Images from the Rosenfeld Collection. Mystic, Conn.: Mystic Seaport. ISBN 0-939510-90-1.
- 2004 – Sailing at Fishers: A History of the Fishers Island Yacht Club. Mystic, Conn.: Mystic Seaport. ISBN 978-0-939510-93-1.
- 2006 – A Berth to Bermuda: 100 Years of the World's Classic Ocean Race. Mystic, Conn.: Mystic Seaport and the Cruising Club of America. ISBN 978-0-939511-17-4.
- 2006 – In a Class by Herself: The Yawl Bolero and the Passion for Craftsmanship. Mystic, Conn.: Mystic Seaport. ISBN 978-0-939511-13-6.
- 2008 – Green Oasis in Brooklyn: The Evergreens Cemetery, 1849–2008. Kittery Point, Maine: Seapoint Books. ISBN 978-0-9786899-4-0.
- 2009 – The New York Yacht Club: A History, 1844–2008. Kittery Point, Maine: Seapoint Books. ISBN 978-0-9706442-2-0 and ISBN 978-0-9706442-3-7.
- 2011 – Piping Rock Club, 1911–2011. Wellington, Florida: Edgeworth Editions. ISBN 978-0-9831343-0-5.
- 2011 – History of the Shelter Island Yacht Club, 1886–2011. Kittery Point, Maine: Seapoint Books (limited edition).
- 2014 – The Annapolis Book of Seamanship. 4th edition. New York: Simon & Schuster.
- 2014 – The Union League Club, 1863–2013. Kittery Point, Maine: Seapoint Books.
- 2014 – Indian Harbor Yacht Club, A History, 1889–2014. Kittery Point, Maine: Seapoint Books.
- 2015 – The Great Atlantic, the First 85 Years. Kittery Point, Maine: Seapoint Books.

=== Articles ===
John Rousmaniere's articles and other shorter writing include the following:

- 2000 – "Back from Bermuda." SailNet.
- 2007 – "Rousmaniere on Killer Storms at Sea," Ocean Navigator Online, March 27, 2007.
- 2007 – "100 Years of Thrashing to the Onion Patch." Newport Bermuda Race website.
- 2008 – "Olin J. Stephens." New York Yacht Club website.
- 2009 – "Australia II: John Rousmaniere Reflects on that Winged Keel." Sail World.
- 2009 – "Fastnet 30 Years Later," SailNet.
- 2010 – Media Team, 2010 Newport-Bermuda Race.
- 2010 – Sails and Nationality in America's Cup History (Declaration, Supreme Court of the State of New York).
- 2010 – Official Race Program, 2010 Newport Bermuda Race (editor and writer).
- 2010 – "The Old Girl's Ready to Dance Anew: Doted over by Maine Craftsmen and Devoted Owners During a 20-month Refit, the Sparkman & Stephens-designed yawl Bolero Is Savoring Her New Vitality," Cruising World (December 2010): 46–51.
- 2011 – Member, U.S. Sailing Association Independent Review Panels for two fatal sailing accidents: the death of a sailor at Annapolis, MD, in June 2011, and the deaths of two sailors during the Chicago Yacht Club Race to Mackinac.
- 2012 – "Tests of Sailor Retrieval, Capsize Recovery, and Entrapment,"
- 2012 – "Freaks or Takeaways: Lessons Learned from Recent Sailing Accidents," Sail (September 2012).
- 2012 – Review of Newport Bermuda Race incident in which a seasick sailor was taken off a racing boat by a cruise ship.
- 2013 – "A Seamanship Ethos," Cruising World (October 2013)
- 2013 – "Revisiting Lessons from the Fastnet"

=== Film and videos ===
- 1982 – co-writer,The Compleat Beatles. ASIN 6301966376.
- 1987–88 – host and writer, The Annapolis Book of Seamanship: Volume One: Cruising Under Sail (ISBN 0-924819-00-6) and four subsequent instructional videos in this series on sailing, plus a video on powerboat navigation.
- 2011 – host, Lifesling Training Video, The Sailing Foundation.
- 2011 – Report of Annapolis accident review, U.S. Sailing Association Annual Meeting, October 29, 2011.

=== Other ===
- 2005 – Emergencies on Board (Captain's Quick Guides). Camden, Maine: International Marine/Ragged Mountain Press. ISBN 978-0-07-145220-5.
- 2005 – Heavy Weather Sailing (Captain's Quick Guides). Camden, Maine: International Marine/Ragged Mountain Press. ISBN 978-0-07-145221-2.
