= Bill Abbott Jr. =

Canadian sailor (born 1954)

Bill Abbott
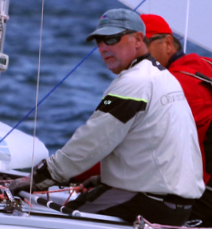

Personal information
- Full name: William Abbott Jr.
- Born: 21 May 1954 (age 72) Sarnia, Ontario, Canada
- Height: 1.72 m (5 ft 8 in)
- Weight: 80 kg (180 lb)

Sport
- Sport: Sailing

William Abbott Jr. (born 21 May 1954) is a Canadian sailor. He competed in the 1996 and 2000 Summer Olympics. In 2021, Abbott was elected vice-chair of the World Sailing Equipment Rules Sub-committee.
