= Buddy Melges =

American sailor (1930–2023)

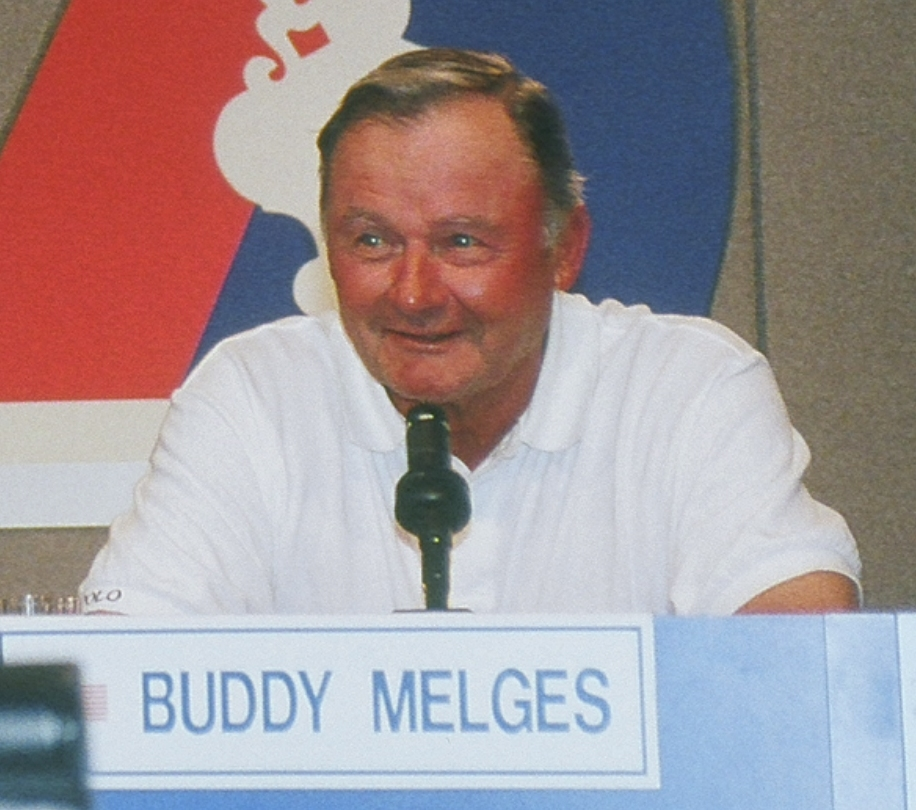
- Melges in 1992

Personal information
- Born: January 26, 1930 Elkhorn, Wisconsin, U.S.
- Died: May 18, 2023 (aged 93) Fontana, Wisconsin, U.S.
Medal record
Sailing
Representing the United States
Olympic Games
Gold medal – first place	1972 Munich	Soling
Bronze medal – third place	1964 Tokyo	Flying Dutchman
Pan American Games
Gold medal – first place	1967 Winnipeg	Flying Dutchman

Harry C. "Buddy" Melges Jr. (January 26, 1930 – May 18, 2023) was an American competitive sailor. He earned national and international championships in several classes in conventional sailing and ice-boating and is widely regarded as one of the top racing sailors of all time.

== Early life ==
Born in Elkhorn, Wisconsin, Melges grew up on Lake Geneva, Wisconsin, sailing the boats designed and manufactured by his father, Harry Melges Sr. Based in Zenda, Wisconsin, Melges Performance Sailboats is still in operation, and is now run by Buddy's son, Harry Melges III.

== Sailing career ==
Melges was an Olympic gold (Soling, 1972) and bronze (Flying Dutchman, 1964) medalist, a two-time Star world champion (1978 and 1979), a three-time 5.5 Meter world champion (1967, 1973 and 1983), a five-time E-Scow national champion (1965, 1969, 1978, 1979 and 1983), a seven-time skeeter ice boat world champion (1955, 1957, 1970, 1972, 1974, 1980 and 1981), and a three-time Yachtsman of the Year (1961, 1972 and 1978). He helped Bill Koch steer his America^{3} to a successful defense of the America's Cup in 1992.

Melges was inducted into the America's Cup Hall of Fame in 2001, and to the Inland Lake Yachting Association Hall of Fame in 2002. He was inducted into the National Sailing Hall of Fame in 2011. Melges lectured and taught across the United States and was a member of many yacht clubs. He was characterized as the "Grand Master" of competitive yachting and was called "The Wizard of Zenda".

== Personal life ==
He was married to Gloria for 69 years till his death with whom he had three children called Laura, Hans, and Harry C. Melges III. He is not to be confused with his father Harry Melges (I) who founded Melges Boats or his son who is also a World Champion sailor Harry Melges III or one of his grandsons Harry Melges IV who is also an America Cup team sailor and Sailing World Champion.

Melges died at his Fontana, Wisconsin, home on May 18, 2023, at the age of 93.
