= Milwaukee Yacht Club =

Advertisement

- Burgee
- Short name: MYC
- Founded: 1871
- Location: Milwaukee
- Website: www.milwaukeeyc.com

The Milwaukee Yacht Club has been in operation on Lake Michigan's coast since 1871. The yacht club's slips are in Milwaukee's McKinley Marina. The Milwaukee Yacht Club is leasing the land from Milwaukee County; the current lease is for 50 years beginning in 2020.

The oldest premier yacht club on Lake Michigan, in the scenic heart of McKinley Marina, Milwaukee Yacht Club welcomes boaters year-round, offering sailing, boating, and dining. It also offers its site for private parties, weddings, and business meetings.

Amenities include a heated pool and spa, outdoor Skylark Bar with its lakeside patio, complimentary kayaks and paddleboards, and gourmet dining in the main clubhouse overlooking the North anchorage of Milwaukee Harbor. It offers worldwide reciprocity through Yacht Clubs of America.

== History ==
The Milwaukee Yacht Club was founded in 1871 on a site north of the Milwaukee River. Incidentally, the channel is the source of the lake water pumped into the Milwaukee River near North Avenue. It is used to flush out the river from time to time. The ornate circa 1888 building on the other side of Lincoln Memorial Drive, occupied by Colectivo Coffee House, houses the original pump that is still used for that purpose. With only a partial sea wall north of the site and east from McKinley Beach, there was little protection for boats back then, and boaters had to be a hardy lot and more self-reliant than they are now.

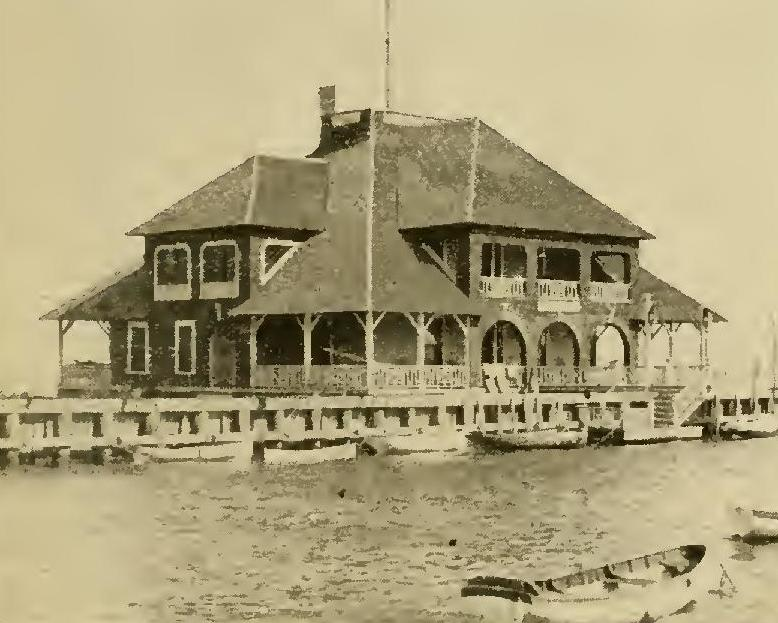
Milwaukee Yacht Club in 1902

The first permanent clubhouse, a stately two-story wood-frame structure, was built on pilings near the channel in 1896. Twenty years later, in 1916 the United States Coast Guard built a lifeboat station on the shoreline across the channel from the Yacht Club. The Coast Guard abandoned its station in 1971.

It was not until the 1920s and 1930s that the outer breakwater protecting all of Milwaukee Bay was built under the leadership of William George Bruce, a founder of the Milwaukee Yacht Club and chairman of the Milwaukee Harbor Commission. Later additions to the breakwater in the 1960s completed the protection for the club and the boat slips in Milwaukee County's McKinley Marina. Throughout this period, the Milwaukee Yacht Club continued to thrive in the face of challenges.

The 1896 clubhouse was destroyed by fire in 1943 in the depths of World War II. In 1945, a small building made largely of concrete was built on the north end of the club's grounds and served as the clubhouse until a replacement clubhouse could be built. However, after the war, building costs had risen and a dispute arose over who owned the land: Milwaukee Yacht Club or Milwaukee County.

It took nearly 20 years but the club and the county resolved the land ownership question. In essence, the county took over the ownership of the land, and agreed to lease the club the land for 25 years in exchange for the club's agreement to build a new clubhouse. In 1967, the new clubhouse was built at a cost of $300,000.

It is a 2 1/2-story, 9,500-square-foot brick building containing the club's main dining room, a smaller dining room for smaller groups, two bars, and a lounge on the top levels overlooking the harbor and Milwaukee's skyline. The lower level contains offices, showers, and restrooms. The old clubhouse now called the Boathouse, houses the office of the dockmaster, a classroom for the Junior Sailing School, event space, plus restrooms, showers and lockers.

In 1994, two years after the first lease with the county expired, the county and the club agreed to extend the lease for 25 years and to give the club an option for another 25 years, allowing the Milwaukee Yacht Club to continue at its present site for 50 years.

Throughout its history, the club also improved other facilities. In 1939, a 20-ton crane was built on the grounds, giving the club, for many years, the only emergency heavy-duty crane between Sturgeon Bay and Chicago. The crane is used mainly now for launching and hauling members boats, stepping and removing masts, and race measurement. The club also installed four small hoists for launching and hauling small boats and installed and maintained its fueling dock, boat slips and equipment for other facilities on the grounds.

In Spring 2000, the club underwent a two-year $1.8 million remodeling project which included adding an in-ground heated pool and spa and expanding the main clubhouse to make more room for meeting rooms and offices. Milwaukee Yacht Club has opened Lake Michigan to thousands of boaters and others throughout its first 147 years.

== Amenities ==
- Brick Clubhouse that is available for private, non-member events such as weddings, parties or business meetings.
- Dining room with full-service menu featuring flavorful, inspired options
- Expansive bar and lounge with fireplace
- Meeting and event space
- Heated pool and spa (boathouse features a bar and grill, locker rooms and showers)
- Lakeside bar and patio
- Sailing and racing fleets and educational seminars
- Sailing school programs for adults and children
- Fleet of Ideal 18's - rugged 18 ft keelboats available for members' use
- Club reciprocity - locally and in North America
- Member events year-round
- Yard and dock - Multiple cranes, full-time staff, storage abilities, pump-out, tender service, year-round storage
- 24-hour upscale bathrooms and showers
- Member benefits include complimentary use of kayaks, paddle boards, bikes, and keelboats.

== Fleet ==
The Milwaukee Yacht Club maintains a fleet of Ideal 18s for complimentary member use. It also offers a luxury pontoon boat for a nominal rental fee.

== Major championships ==
=== Soling North American Championship ===
The club took the initiative to organize the first Soling North American Championship in 1969. Since then the event was held several times at this location.
