= North American Championship =

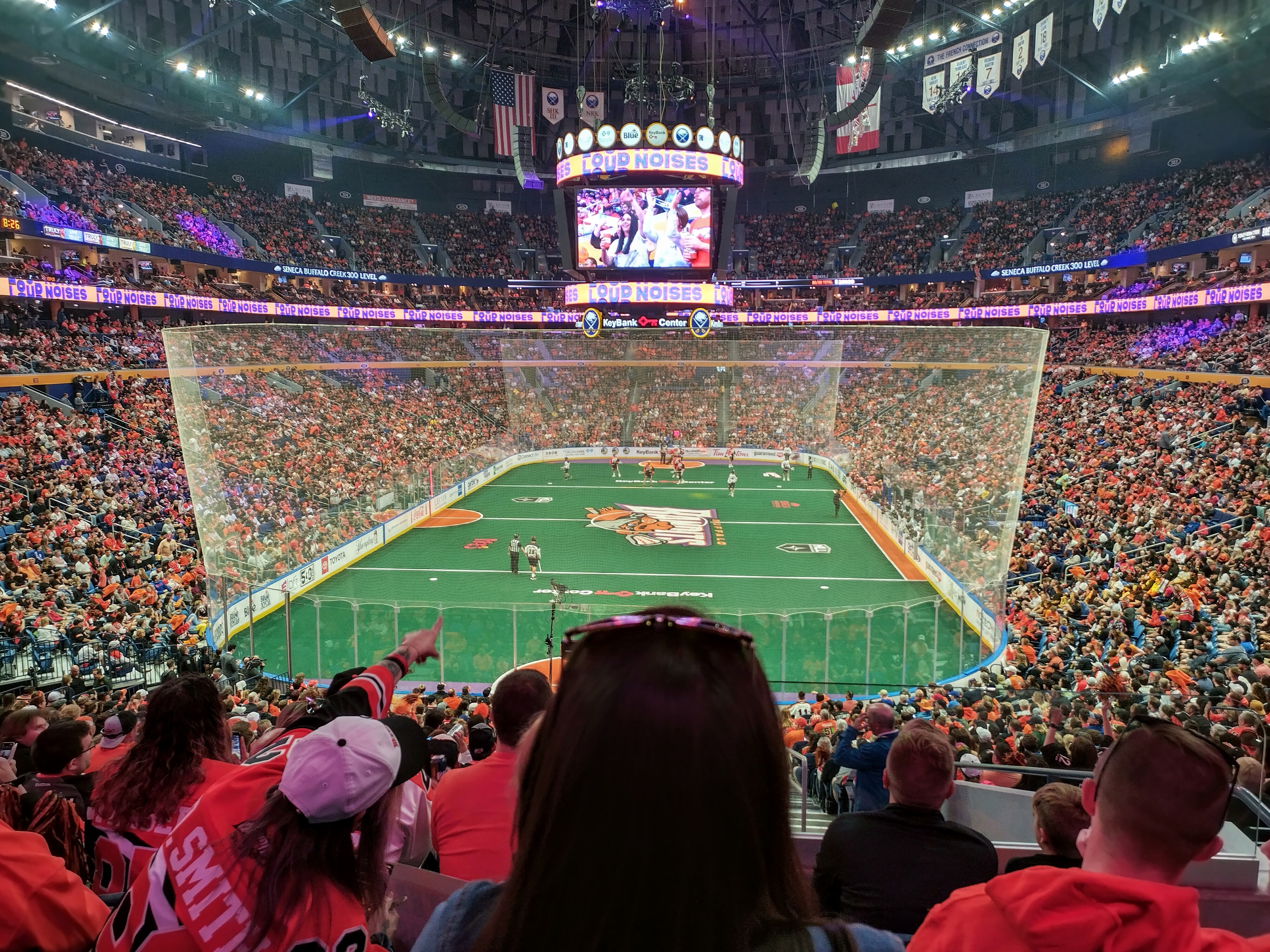

A North American Championship is a top level international sports competition between North American athletes or sports teams representing their respective countries or professional sports clubs.

== List of championships ==
Bridge

- North American Bridge Championships

Cricket

- North American Cup

Debate

- North American Debating Championship

Figure skating

- North American Figure Skating Championships

Mushing

- Open North American Championships

Orienteering

- North American Orienteering Championships

Sailing

- Snipe North American Championship
- Soling North American Championship

Wrestling

- GWF North American Heavyweight Championship
- WWF North American Heavyweight Championship
- Mid-South North American Heavyweight Championship
- NWA North American Heavyweight Championship
- NWA North American Tag Team Championship
- NWF North American Heavyweight Championship
- NXT North American Championship
- Stampede Wrestling North American Heavyweight Championship
- WWC North American Tag Team Championship
- WWC North American Heavyweight Championship
- NXT Women's North American Championship

== See also ==
- Championship
- World championship
- African Championship
- Asian Championship
- European Championship
- Oceania Championship
- Pan American Championship
  - Canadian Championships
  - South American Championship
