= Soling World Championship results (1969–1979) =

Soling
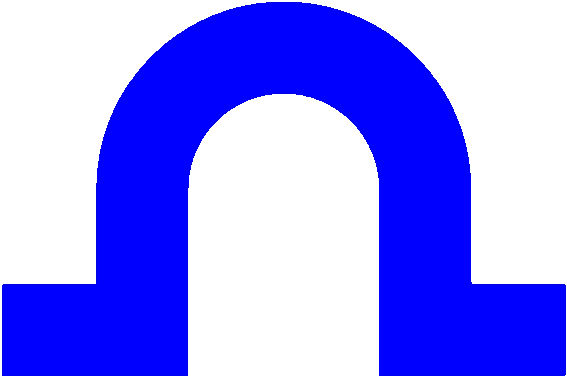

Development
- Name: Soling

This article stated the results of the World Soling Championships from 1969 till 1979. Unfortunately not all crew names are documented in the major sources: United States Soling Association (USSA) bulletin "Leading Edge" and International Soling Association (ISA) magazine "Soling Sailing".

== 1969 Final results ==
1969
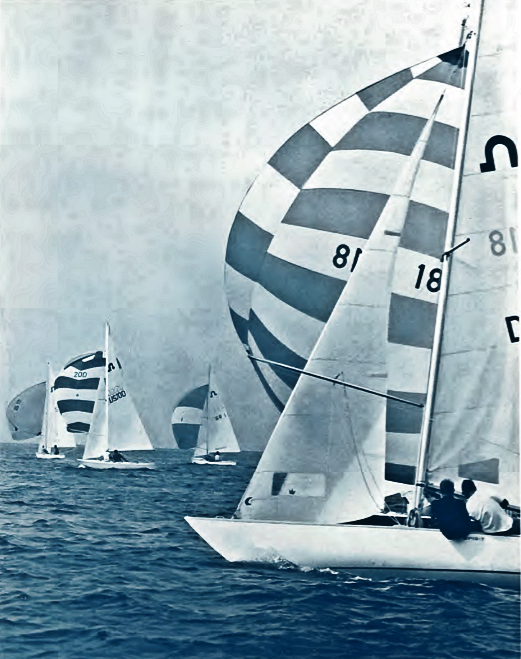

Event title
- Edition: 1,
- Host: Royal Danish Yacht Club

Event details
- Venue: Copenhagen, Denmark
- Yachts: 87 (started in two groups)

Competitors
- Competitors: 261
- Competing nations: 17

Results
- (gold) Gold: Denmark; Paul Elvstrøm; Niels Jensen; Poul Mik-Meyer
- (silver) Silver: Sweden; Pelle Petterson; Crew not documented
- (bronze) Bronze: United States; Ding Schoonmaker; Crew not documented

Only the top 5 places are documented.

Rank	Country	Helmsman	Crew	Sail No.	Race 1		Race 2		Race 3		Race 4		Race 5		Race 6		Total	Total – discard
Rank	Country	Helmsman	Crew	Sail No.	Pos.	Pts.	Pos.	Pts.	Pos.	Pts.	Pos.	Pts.	Pos.	Pts.	Pos.	Pts.	Total	Total – discard
1st place, gold medalist(s)	DEN	Paul Elvstrøm	Niels Jensen; Poul Mik-Meyer	D 29	1	0.0	1	0.0	1	0.0	1	0.0	3	5.7	~~11~~	~~17.0~~	22.7	5.7
2nd place, silver medalist(s)	SWE	Pelle Petterson	Not documented	S 20	2	3.0	1	0.0	1	0.0	~~4~~	~~8.0~~	1	0.0	2	3.0	14.0	6.0
3rd place, bronze medalist(s)	USA	Ding Schoonmaker	Not documented	US 167	1	0.0	~~11~~	~~17.0~~	2	3.0	1	0.0	2	3.0	5	10.0	33.0	16.0
4	GBR	Rodney Pattison	Not documented	K 38	3	5.7	2	3.0	3	5.7	2	3.0	6	11.7	~~21~~	~~27.0~~	56.1	29.1
5	DEN	Niels Bolt Jørgensen	Not documented	D 19	3	5.7	2	3.0	7	13.0	3	5.7	3	5.7	~~13~~	~~19.0~~	52.1	33.1

Legend: DNF – Did not finish; DNS – Did not start; DSQ – Disqualified;
Discard is crossed out and does not count for the overall result.

- 1969 Progress

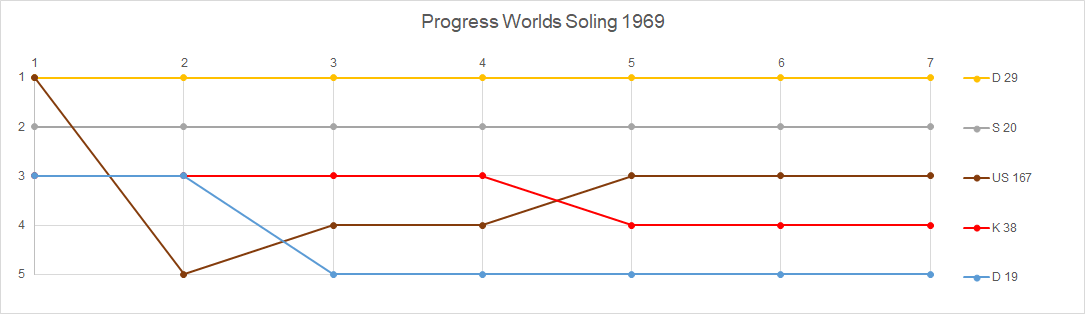

== 1970 Final results ==
1970
Event title
- Edition: 2,

Event details
- Venue: Poole, United Kingdom
- Dates: 9–16 June 1970

Results
- (gold) Gold: Sweden; Stig Wennerström; Stefan Krook; Jan Lybeck
- (silver) Silver: United States; John Dane III; Mark LeBlanc; John Cerise
- (bronze) Bronze: United Kingdom; John Oakeley; Crew not documented

== 1971 Final results ==
1971
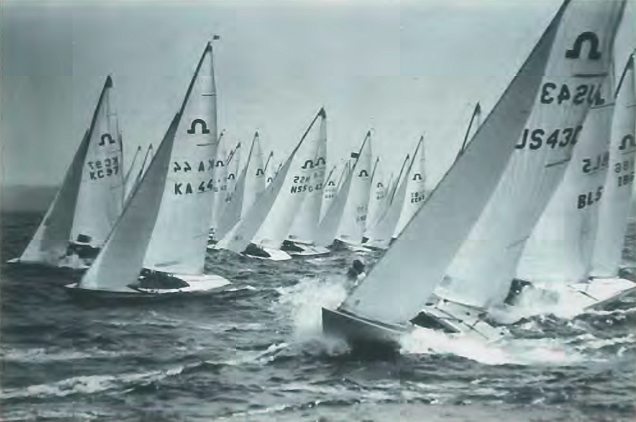

Event title
- Edition: 3,
- Host: Seawanhaka Corinthian Yacht Club

Event details
- Venue: Oyster Bay, New York, United States
- Dates: 25 Sep – 1 Oct 1971

Results
- (gold) Gold: United States; Bob Mosbacher; Thad Hutcheson; Tom Dickey
- (silver) Silver: United States; Bruce Goldsmith; Crew not documented
- (bronze) Bronze: Denmark; Paul Elvstrøm; Valdemar Bandolowski; Niels Jensen

== 1972 Final results ==
1972

Event title
- Edition: 4

== 1973 Final results ==
1973
Event title
- Edition: 5,

Event details
- Venue: Quiberon, France

Results
- (gold) Gold: Denmark; Ib Ussing Andersen; Jørgen Lindhasten; Hans Winther
- (silver) Silver: Denmark; Poul Richard Høj Jensen; Crew not documented
- (bronze) Bronze: Sweden; Stig Wennerström; Stefan Krook; Jan Lybeck

Only a few results are documented: Only total but no detailed results are documented.

Rank	Country	Helmsman	Crew
1st place, gold medalist(s)	Denmark	Ib Ussing Andersen	Jørgen Lindhasten; Hans Winther
2nd place, silver medalist(s)	Denmark	Poul Richard Høj Jensen	Not documented
3rd place, bronze medalist(s)	Sweden	Stig Wennerström	Stefan Krook; Jan Lybeck
4	Netherlands	Geert Bakker	Not documented
5	Not documented	Not documented	Not documented
6	Not documented	Not documented	Not documented
7	Netherlands	Heike Blok	Not documented

== 1974 Final results ==
1974
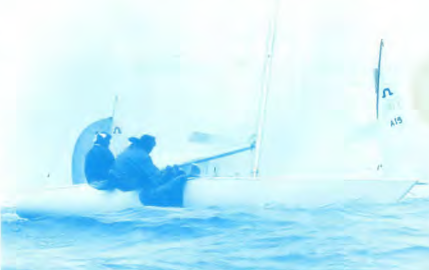

Event title
- Edition: 6,
- Host: Royal Prince Alfred Yacht Club (RPAYC)

Event details
- Venue: Sydney, Australia
- Yachts: 38

Competitors
- Competitors: 114
- Competing nations: 14

Results
- (gold) Gold: Denmark; Paul Elvstrøm; Hans Fogh; Bruce McCurrach South Africa
- (silver) Silver: Australia; David Forbes; Denis O'Neil; John Anderson
- (bronze) Bronze: Sweden; Arved von Grünewaldt; Tommy Nilsson; Hjalmar Schibbye

Rank	Country	Helmsman	Crew	Sail No.	Boat	Race 1		Race 2		Race 3		Race 4		Race 5		Race 6		Race 7		Total	Total – discard
Rank	Country	Helmsman	Crew	Sail No.	Boat	Pos.	Pts.	Pos.	Pts.	Pos.	Pts.	Pos.	Pts.	Pos.	Pts.	Pos.	Pts.	Pos.	Pts.	Total	Total – discard
1st place, gold medalist(s)	DEN	Paul Elvstrøm	Hans Fogh; Bruce McCurrach, South Africa	D 61	Bes	1	0.0	1	0.0	1	0.0	~~11~~	~~17.0~~	1	0.0	7	13.0	2	3.0	33.0	16.0
2nd place, silver medalist(s)	AUS	Dave Forbes	Denis O'Neil; John Anderson	KA 128	Pocohontas	~~5~~	~~10.0~~	2	3.0	5	10.0	1	0.0	2	3.0	5	10.0	1	0.0	36.0	26.0
3rd place, bronze medalist(s)	SWE	Arved von Grünewaldt	Tommy Nilsson; Hjalmar Schibbye	S 101	Oh Calcutta	3	5.7	10	16.0	4	8.0	3	5.7	11	17.0	~~17~~	~~23.0~~	9	15.0	90.4	67.4
4	ESP	Juan Costas	Not documented	E 1	Malaguena	~~14~~	~~20.0~~	14	20.0	11	17.0	2	3.0	8	14.0	2	3.0	6	11.7	88.7	68.7
5	USA	John Kolius	Not documented	US 576	Good News	2	3.0	4	8.0	13	19.0	~~DNF~~	~~43.0~~	9	15.0	3	5.7	18	24.0	117.7	74.7
6	USA	Jon Coggan	Not documented	US 582	Wringer	8	14.0	5	10.0	7	13.0	5	10.0	~~12~~	~~18.0~~	10	16.0	11	17.0	98.0	80.0
7	AUS	Noel Robins	Not documented	KA 115	Taworri	12	18.0	6	11.7	9	15.0	6	11.7	5	10.0	12	18.0	~~DNF~~	~~41.0~~	125.4	84.4
8	NOR	Kalle Neergaard	Not documented	N 76	Dilemma	7	13.0	8	14.0	2	3.0	29	35.0	18	24.0	~~32~~	~~38.0~~	3	5.7	132.7	94.7
9	NZL	A. Ballantine	Not documented	KZ 5	Solway Streamer	10	16.0	12	18.0	~~DNF~~	~~44.0~~	10	16.0	17	23.0	9	15.0	7	13.0	145.0	101.0
10	AUS	Norman G. Booth	Not documented	KA 120	Adios	21	27.0	21	27.0	3	5.7	8	14.0	~~23~~	~~29.0~~	4	8.0	17	23.0	133.7	104.7
11	USA	William T. Moore Jr.	Not documented	US 565	Old Blue	4	8.0	~~DNF~~	~~43.0~~	33	39.0	9	15.0	3	5.7	1	0.0	33	39.0	149.7	106.7
12	ITA	Enrico Gambaro	Not documented	I 96	Simon Boccanegra	~~32~~	~~38~~	11	17.0	6	11.7	4	8.0	27	33.0	8	14.0	20	26.0	147.7	109.7
13	NZL	A. Roberts	Not documented	KZ 9	Rangatira	11	17.0	3	5.7	10	16.0	27	33.0	20	26.0	~~31~~	~~37.0~~	8	14.0	148.7	111.7
14	AUS	Robert	Not documented	KA 121	Terror	~~34~~	~~40.0~~	22	28.0	14	20.0	13	19.0	7	13.0	18	24.0	4	8.0	152.0	112.0
15	BRA	Ivan Pimentel	Not documented	BL 29	Winkie	17	23.0	20	26.0	12	18.0	12	18.0	13	19.0	~~DNF~~	~~43.0~~	5	10.0	157.0	114.0
16	AUS	K. S. Winterbottom	Not documented	KA 127	Bojangles	6	11.7	7	13.0	18	24.0	~~DSQ~~	~~47.8~~	4	8.0	25	31.0	25	31.0	166.5	118.7
17	AUS	W. A. Solomons	Not documented	KA 46	Amity	15	21.0	9	15.0	22	28.0	15	21.0	15	21.0	~~29~~	~~35.0~~	10	16.0	157.0	122.0
18	GBR	C.C. Hobday	Not documented	K 100	Super Bear	9	15.0	~~31~~	~~37.0~~	29	35.0	14	20.0	6	11.7	21	27.0	15	21.0	166.7	129.7
19	AUS	Manford	Day; Not documented	KA 114	Leda	~~DNF~~	~~44~~	15	21.0	21	27.0	25	31.0	14	20.0	6	11.7	27	33.0	187.7	143.7
20	AUS	R. R. Dickson	Not documented	KA 73	Seventy Three	13	19.0	23	29.0	~~24~~	~~30.0~~	16	22.0	21	27.0	13	19.0	24	30.0	176.0	146.0
21	AUS	M. Anderson	Not documented	KA 39	Brolga	~~26~~	~~32.0~~	16	22.0	23	29.0	23	29.0	10	16.0	22	28.0	22	28.0	184.0	152.0
22	AUS	N.A. Wilson	Not documented	KA 122	Elite	29	35.0	19	25.0	15	21.0	~~31~~	~~37.0~~	29	35.0	11	17.0	14	20.0	190.0	153.0
23	NZL	Helmer Pedersen	Not documented	KZ 7	Zeus	23	29.0	13	19.0	32	38.0	18	24.0	16	22.0	15	21.0	~~DNF~~	~~41.0~~	194.0	153.0
24	USA	K. Beashel	B. Derecktor; Not documented	US 510	Humbug	16	22.0	17	23.0	16	22.0	21	27.0	25	31.0	~~28~~	~~34.0~~	23	29.0	188.0	154.0
25	AUS	M. Ahern	Not documented	KA 112	Papillon	24	30.0	27	33.0	~~31~~	~~37.0~~	7	13.0	22	28.0	16	22.0	26	32.0	195.0	158.0
26	ARG	Boneo	Duperron; Scuderi	A 15	Patrice II	~~30~~	~~36.0~~	24	30.0	20	26.0	30	36.0	19	25.0	20	26.0	12	18.0	197.0	161.0
27	NOR	John Johnsen	Not documented	N 56	Cynara III	19	25.0	28	34.0	28	34.0	~~DNS~~	~~44.0~~	31	37.0	14	20.0	13	19.0	213.0	169.0
28	ITA	Mario Gallini	Not documented	I 132	Mizar	20	26.0	~~DNF~~	~~43.0~~	27	33.0	22	28.0	24	30.0	23	29.0	19	25.0	214.0	171.0
29	BRA	Mario T. lnneco	Not documented	BL 33	Bounty IV	22	28.0	~~34~~	~~40.0~~	8	14.0	28	34.0	33	39.0	30	36.0	16	22.0	213.0	173.0
30	NZL	W. Moyes	Not documented	KZ 6	Vibrant	~~28~~	~~34.0~~	18	24.0	17	23.0	26	32.0	28	34.0	27	33.0	21	27.0	207.0	173.0
31	AUS	F.l. Ford	Not documented	KA 9	Solong	27	33.0	26	32.0	26	32.0	20	26.0	26	32.0	19	25.0	~~28~~	~~34.0~~	214.0	180.0
32	AUS	H. Sutton	A. H. Antill; Not documented	KA 3	Piranha	18	24.0	32	38.0	25	31.0	19	25.0	32	38.0	24	30.0	~~DNF~~	~~41.0~~	227.0	186.0
33	NZL	Hugh Poole	Not documented	KZ 2	Patches	25	31.0	30	36.0	19	25.0	17	23.0	~~36~~	~~42.0~~	34	40.0	34	40.0	237.0	195.0
34	NZL	J. Dyes	Thom Dyes; Not documented	KZ 3	Donnybrook	33	39.0	29	35.0	34	40.0	24	30.0	30	36.0	~~DNF~~	~~43.0~~	32	38.0	261.0	218.0
35	JPN	Toyokazu Maeda	Not documented	J 11	Roulette	31	37.0	25	31.0	35	41.0	32	38.0	~~37~~	~~43.0~~	DNF	41.0	DNF	41.0	272.0	229.0
36	FIN	Vladimir Marschan	Not documented	L 31	Alexia III	35	41.0	36	42.0	~~DNF~~	~~44.0~~	33	39.0	35	41.0	26	32.0	31	37.0	276.0	232.0
37	JPN	Tsuneo Sanada	Not documented	J 12	Solander	~~37~~	~~43.0~~	35	41.0	30	36.0	35	41.0	34	40.0	35	41.0	29	35.0	277.0	234.0
38	SUI	W. Schlatter	Not documented	Z 126	Chance	36	42.0	33	39.0	~~DNF~~	~~44.0~~	34	40.0	38	44.0	36	42.0	30	36.0	287.0	243.0

Legend: DNF – Did not finish; DNS – Did not start; DSQ – Disqualified;
Discard is crossed out and does not count for the overall result.

- 1974 Progress

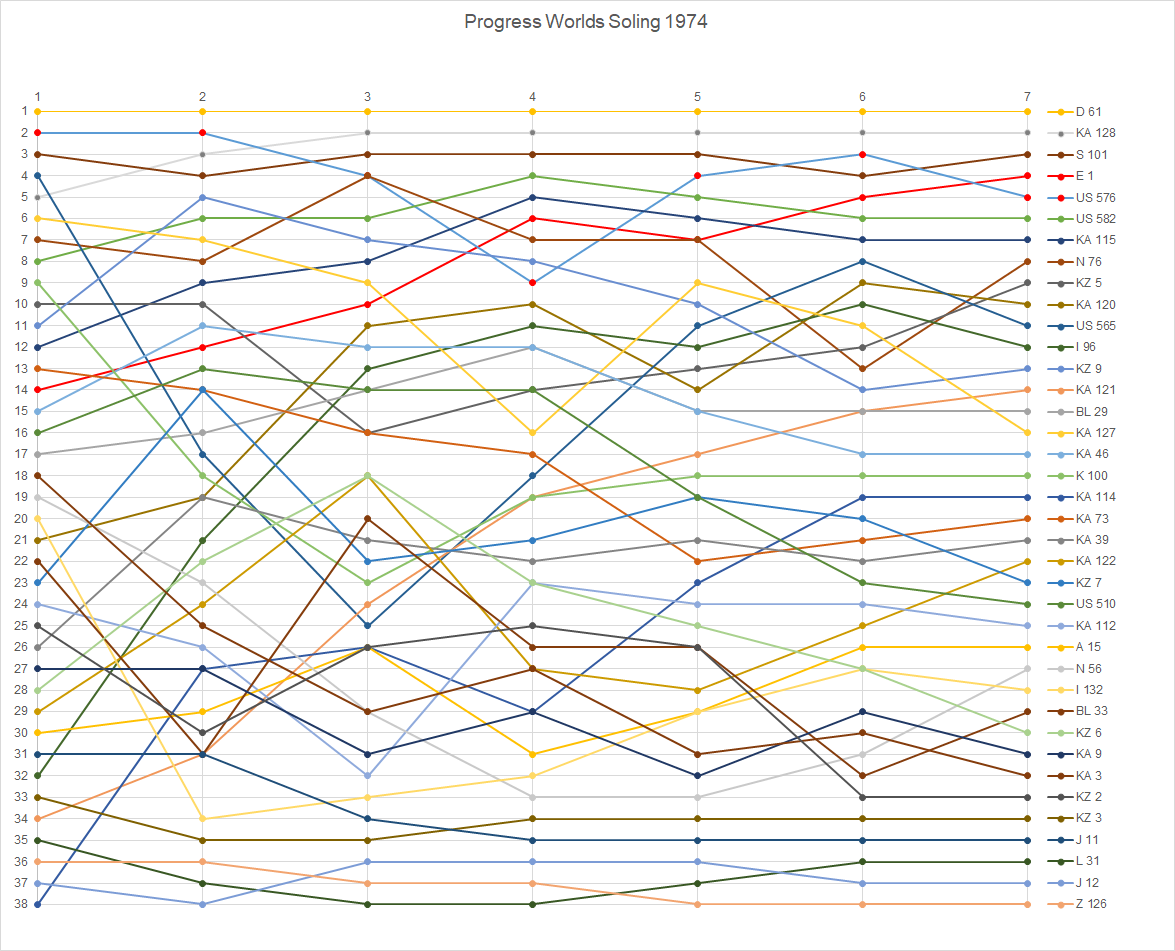

== 1975 Final results ==
1975
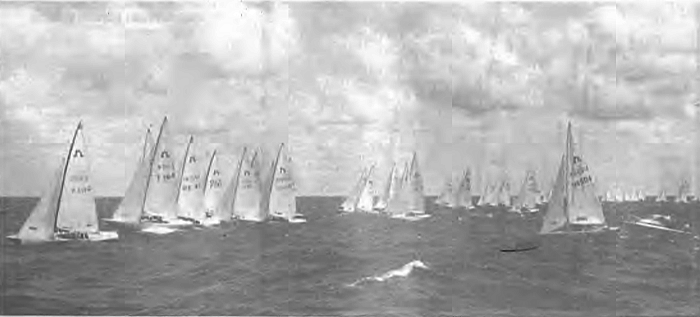

Event title
- Edition: 7,
- Host: Chicago Yacht Club (CYC)

Event details
- Venue: Chicago, United States
- Dates: 1–9 August 1975
- Yachts: 62
- Opening ceremony: 3 August 1975

Competitors
- Competitors: 186
- Competing nations: 19

Results
- (gold) Gold: United States; Bill Buchan; Craig Thomas; Joe Golberg
- (silver) Silver: United States; Buddy Melges; Crew not documented
- (bronze) Bronze: Sweden; John Kolius; Walter Glasgow; Richard Hoepfner

Rank	Country	Helmsman	Crew	Sail No.	Race 1		Race 2		Race 3		Race 4		Race 5		Race 6		Race 7		Total	Total – discard
Rank	Country	Helmsman	Crew	Sail No.	Pos.	Pts.	Pos.	Pts.	Pos.	Pts.	Pos.	Pts.	Pos.	Pts.	Pos.	Pts.	Pos.	Pts.	Total	Total – discard
1st place, gold medalist(s)	USA	Bill Buchan	Craig Thomas; Joe Golberg	US 593	1	0.0	6	11.7	2	3.0	3	5.7	18	24.0	1	0.0	~~DNS~~	~~68.0~~	112.4	44.4
2nd place, silver medalist(s)	USA	Buddy Melges	Not documented	US 630	~~PMS~~	~~75.0~~	8	14.0	3	5.7	9	15.0	5	10.0	2	3.0	19	25.0	147.7	72.7
3rd place, bronze medalist(s)	USA	John Kolius	Walter Glasgow; Richard Hoepfner	US 610	9	15.0	4	8.0	7	13.0	~~15~~	~~21.0~~	7	13.0	4	8.0	16	22.0	100.0	78.0
4	DEN	Ricardo G. Jensen	Not documented	D 68	5	10.0	15	21.0	14	20.0	2	3.0	~~PMS~~	~~75.0~~	10	16.0	5	10.0	155.0	80.0
5	GER	Willi Kuhweide	Not documented	G 135	~~PMS~~	~~75.0~~	32	38.0	1	0.0	1	0.0	12	18.0	6	11.7	8	14.0	156.7	81.7
6	AUT	Hubert Raudaschl	Not documented	OE 41	14	20.0	5	10.0	25	31.0	6	11.7	13	19.0	~~34~~	~~40.0~~	1	0.0	131.7	91.7
7	SWE	Arvid von Gruenewald	Not documented	S 83	16	22.0	10	16.0	~~30~~	~~36.0~~	11	17.0	10	16.0	23	29.0	2	3.0	139	103
8	USA	Dave Curtis	Not documented	US 575	26	32.0	2	3.0	9	15.0	~~PMS~~	~~75.0~~	4	8.0	15	21.0	23	29.0	183.0	108.0
9	BRA	Gastão Brun	Not documented	BL 15	8	14.0	~~45~~	~~51.0~~	8	14.0	12	18.0	1	0.0	36	42.0	22	28.0	167.0	116.0
10	USA	Richard Stearns	Not documented	US 641	7	13.0	12	18.0	~~43~~	~~49.0~~	32	38.0	8	14.0	7	13.0	20	26.0	171.0	122.0
11	AUS	Noel Robins	Not documented	KA 115	20	26.0	~~44~~	~~50.0~~	22	28.0	18	24.0	11	17.0	14	20.0	10	16.0	181.0	131.0
12	SWE	Stig Wennerström	Not documented	S 111	33	39.0	13	19.0	4	8.0	8	14.0	9	15.0	~~PMS~~	~~75.0~~	34	40.0	210.0	135.0
13	NED	Geert Bakker	Harald de Vlaming; Pieter Keijzer	H 17	35	41.0	21	27.0	5	10.0	4	8.0	28	34.0	12	18.0	~~39~~	~~45.0~~	183.0	138.0
14	ESP	Juan Costas	Not documented	E 20	~~29~~	~~35.0~~	14	20.0	15	21.0	20	26.0	17	23.0	26	32.0	13	19.0	176.0	141.0
15	AUS	James Hardy	Not documented	KA 144	25	31.0	~~37~~	~~43.0~~	12	18.0	10	16.0	6	11.7	20	26.0	33	39.0	184.7	141.7
16	USA	Jim Coggin	Not documented	US 232	~~PMS~~	~~75.0~~	20	26.0	18	24.0	16	22.0	14	20.0	13	19.0	25	31.0	217.0	142.0
17	GER	Erich Hirt	Not documented	G 139	~~PMS~~	~~75.0~~	27	33.0	11	17.0	5	10.0	23	29.0	19	25.0	24	30.0	219.0	144.0
18	FRA	Henri Samuel	Not documented	F 127	13	19.0	16	22.0	36	42.0	~~37~~	~~43.0~~	21	27.0	16	22.0	7	13.0	188.0	145.0
19	CAN	Paul Henderson	Not documented	KC 129	11	17.0	11	17.0	31	37.0	~~DSQ~~	~~68.0~~	16	22.0	42	48.0	4	8.0	217.0	149.0
20	FIN	Matti Joninen	Not documented	L 35	6	11.7	26	32.0	28	34.0	33	39.0	~~34~~	~~40.0~~	9	15.0	12	18.0	189.7	149.7
21	USA	Morrie Rattray	Not documented	US 296	19	25.0	19	25.0	21	27.0	~~52~~	~~58.0~~	25	31.0	25	31.0	6	11.7	208.7	150.7
22	ARG	Pedro Ferrero	Not documented	A 10	10	16.0	1	0.0	26	32.0	35	41.0	20	26.0	~~37~~	~~43.0~~	30	36.0	194.0	151.0
23	NED	Heike Blok	Not documented	H 14	2	3.0	24	30.0	10	16.0	19	25.0	~~49~~	~~55.0~~	32	38.0	44	50.0	217.0	162.0
24	CAN	Glen Dexter	Not documented	KC 122	~~PMS~~	~~75.0~~	54	60.0	23	29.0	22	28.0	3	5.7	5	10.0	26	32.0	239.7	164.7
25	USA	Charlie Kamps	Not documented	US 547	4	8.0	9	15.0	~~47~~	~~53.0~~	27	33.0	27	33.0	35	41.0	41	47.0	230.0	177.0
26	ARG	Ricardo Boneo	Not documented	A 15	15	21.0	17	23.0	19	25.0	31	37.0	33	39.0	~~48~~	~~54.0~~	27	33.0	232.0	178.0
27	ITA	Fabio Albarelli	Not documented	I 164	22	28.0	7	13.0	6	11.7	40	46.0	~~DSQ~~	~~68.0~~	31	37.0	38	44.0	247.7	179.7
28	USA	Robbie Haines	Not documented	US 268	PMS	75.0	32	38.0	17	23.0	7	13.0	26	32.0	~~DSQ~~	~~68.0~~	3	5.7	254.7	179.7
29	GBR	Charles Ingham	Not documented	K 111	21	27.0	50	56.0	24	30.0	~~PMS~~	~~75.0~~	2	3.0	44	50.0	9	15.0	256.0	181.0
30	GBR	Iain Woolward	Not documented	K 113	30	36.0	3	5.7	29	35.0	29	35.0	39	45.0	~~50~~	~~56.0~~	21	27.0	239.7	183.7
31	USA	Kenneth Young	Not documented	US 497	3	5.7	18	24.0	~~PMS~~	~~75.0~~	42	48.0	24	30.0	27	33.0	37	43.0	258.7	183.7
32	GRE	George Andreadis	Not documented	GR 24	28	34.0	25	31.0	13	19.0	13	19.0	30	36.0	~~45~~	~~51.0~~	45	51.0	241.0	190.0
33	AUS	Malcolm Anderson	Not documented	KA 39	12	18.0	40	46.0	33	39.0	21	27.0	~~42~~	~~48.0~~	21	27.0	29	35.0	240.0	192.0
34	FIN	Lehtinen Raimo	Not documented	L 36	~~PMS~~	~~75.0~~	PMS	75.0	20	26.0	14	20.0	22	28.0	8	14.0	28	34.0	272.0	197.0
35	AUT	Ulli Strohscheider	Not documented	OE 48	27	33.0	28	34.0	35	41.0	56	62.0	~~PMS~~	~~75.0~~	3	5.7	18	24.0	274.7	199.7
36	USA	Jon Ford	Not documented	US 564	18	24.0	34	40.0	32	38.0	~~39~~	~~45.0~~	19	25.0	29	35.0	32	38.0	245.0	200.0
37	NED	Rien Rozendaal	Not documented	H 15	24	30.0	~~57~~	~~63.0~~	27	33.0	41	47.0	31	37.0	39	45.0	11	17.0	272.0	209.0
38	JPN	Moritaka Kaidoh	Not documented	J 7	~~PMS~~	~~75.0~~	47	53.0	34	40.0	30	36.0	15	21.0	33	39.0	17	23.0	287.0	212.0
39	NZL	Allan Balintine	Not documented	KZ 5	23	29.0	36	42.0	42	48.0	28	34.0	~~45~~	~~51.0~~	17	23.0	50	56.0	283.0	227.0
40	CAN	Bill Abbott Jr.	Bill Abbott Sr. Not documented	KC 1	17	23.0	23	29.0	44	50.0	38	44.0	~~DSQ~~	~~68.0~~	56	62.0	14	20.0	296.0	228.0
41	SWE	Jörgen Sundelin	Not documented	S 105	~~PMS~~	~~75.0~~	22	28.0	46	52.0	45	51.0	35	41.0	18	24.0	40	46.0	317.0	242.0
42	GBR	Guy Gurney	Not documented	K 120	44	50.0	~~52~~	~~58.0~~	17	23.0	17	23.0	45	51.0	41	47.0	42	48.0	300.0	242.0
43	NZL	Don Lidgard	Not documented	KZ 10	32	38.0	38	44.0	40	46.0	24	30.0	46	52.0	28	34.0	~~DNS~~	~~68.0~~	312.0	244.0
44	USA	Bruce Goldsmith	Not documented	US 640	~~PMS~~	~~75.0~~	48	54.0	52	58.0	26	32.0	29	35.0	38	44.0	15	21.0	319.0	244.0
45	FRA	Bertrant Cheret	Not documented	F 121	36	42.0	~~53~~	~~59.0~~	42	48.0	34	40.0	38	44.0	30	36.0	31	37.0	306.0	247.0
46	GBR	Jon Allen	Not documented	K 121	37	43.0	46	52.0	41	47.0	~~DSQ~~	~~68.0~~	37	43.0	11	17.0	54	60.0	330.0	262.0
47	BRA	Augusto Sarrozo	Not documented	BL 20	34	40.0	42	48.0	~~53~~	~~59.0~~	43	49.0	48	54.0	24	30.0	46	52.0	332.0	273.0
48	FRA	René Sence	Not documented	F 121	42	48.0	31	37.0	39	45.0	46	52.0	44	50.0	43	49.0	~~PMS~~	~~75.0~~	356.0	281.0
49	USA	George Francisco	Not documented	US 504	39	45.0	49	55.0	59	65.0	~~DSQ~~	~~68.0~~	41	47.0	22	28.0	36	42.0	350.0	282.0
50	USA	Orvind Lorentzen	Not documented	US 589	41	47.0	35	41.0	45	51.0	44	50.0	36	42.0	~~49~~	~~55.0~~	48	54.0	340.0	285.0
51	BRA	Romos Eduardo	Not documented	BL 33	~~PMS~~	~~75.0~~	43	49.0	48	54.0	23	29.0	43	49.0	58	64.0	35	41.0	361.0	286.0
52	FRA	Alain Nicolaidis	Not documented	F 114	38	44.0	41	47.0	~~PMS~~	~~75.0~~	49	55.0	32	38.0	51	57.0	47	53.0	369.0	294.0
53	NZL	Hugh Poole	Not documented	KZ 14	46	52.0	51	57.0	~~PMS~~	~~75.0~~	36	42.0	40	46.0	46	52.0	43	49.0	373.0	298.0
54	USA	Tony Smythe	Not documented	US 585	40	46.0	30	36.0	49	55.0	~~55~~	~~61.0~~	53	59.0	40	46.0	51	57.0	360.0	299.0
55	AUS	Francis Ian Ford	Not documented	KA 9	49	55.0	~~60~~	~~66.0~~	38	44.0	25	31.0	51	57.0	52	58.0	55	61.0	372.0	306.0
56	USA	Jack Van Dyke	Not documented	US 601	45	51.0	29	35.0	51	57.0	47	53.0	50	56.0	55	61.0	~~DNF~~	~~68.0~~	381.0	313.0
57	SWE	Ragnar Lindstedt	Not documented	S 98	31	37.0	~~DSQ~~	~~68.0~~	57	63.0	48	54.0	52	58.0	53	59.0	49	55.0	394.0	326.0
58	USA	Mac Dunwoodie	Not documented	US 574	~~PMS~~	~~75.0~~	39	45.0	55	61.0	54	60.0	47	53.0	47	53.0	DNF	68.0	415.0	340.0
59	JPN	Masaaki Tsuji	Not documented	J 17	48	54.0	55	61.0	50	56.0	50	56.0	~~56~~	~~62.0~~	54	60.0	53	59.0	408.0	346.0
60	ITA	Sergio Orlandi	Not documented	I 163	47	53.0	~~59~~	~~65.0~~	54	60.0	53	59.0	54	60.0	57	63.0	52	58.0	418.0	353.0
61	ISV	Don R. Myers	Not documented	VI 7	43	49.0	56	62.0	58	64.0	~~DNF~~	~~68.0~~	58	64.0	59	65.0	56	62.0	434.0	366.0
62	CAN	Ken Giles	Not documented	KC 127	~~PMS~~	~~75.0~~	58	64.0	56	62.0	51	57.0	57	63.0	60	66.0	DNF	68.0	455.0	380.0

Legend: DNF – Did not finish; DNS – Did not start; DSQ – Disqualified;
Discard is crossed out and does not count for the overall result.

- 1975 Progress

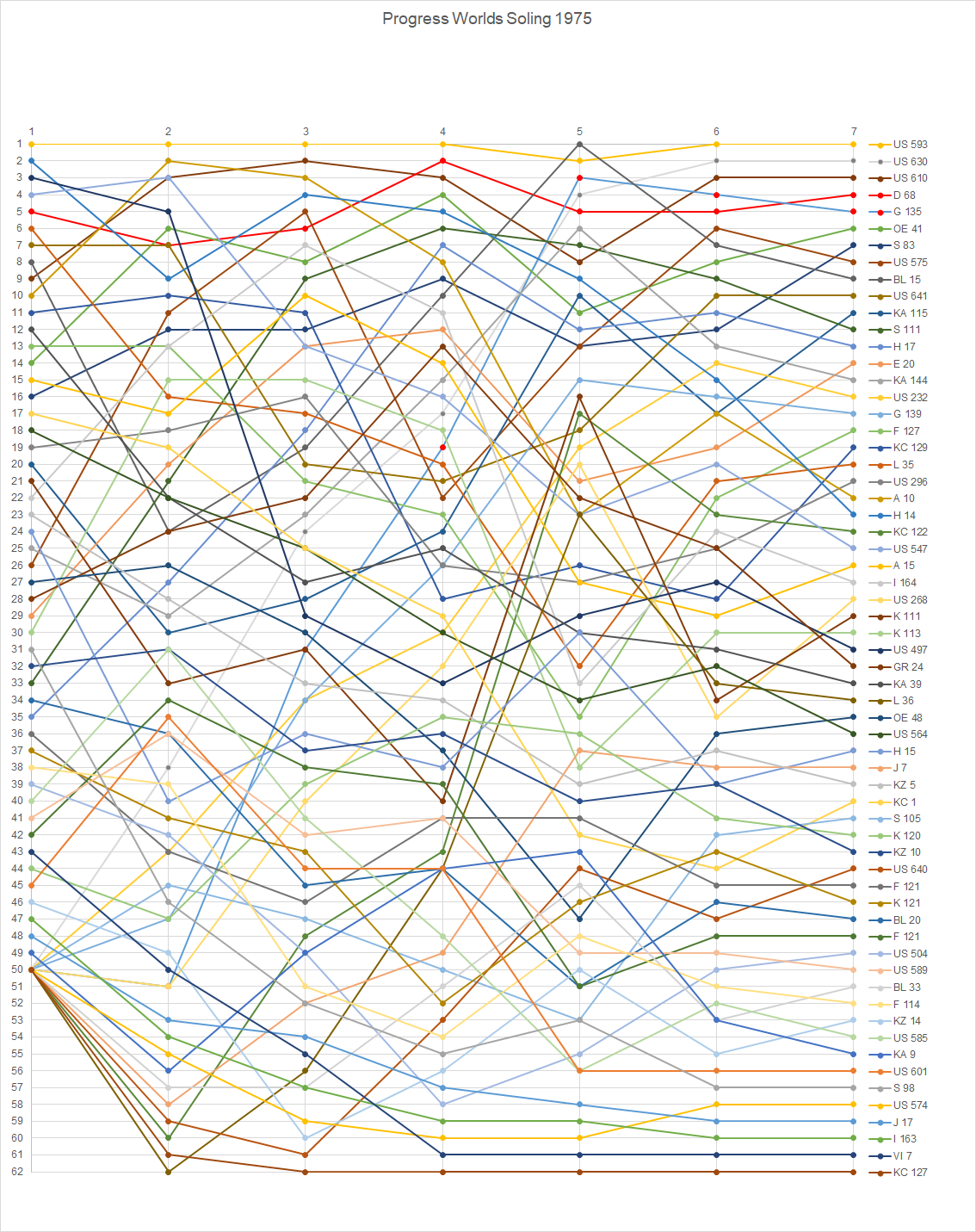

== 1976 Final results ==
1976

Event title
- Edition: 8

== 1977 Final results ==
1977
Event title
- Edition: 9,
- Host: Hankø Yacht Club

Event details
- Venue: Hankø, Norway
- Dates: 1–11 July 1977
- Yachts: 60
- Opening ceremony: 4-July-1977

Competitors
- Competitors: 180
- Competing nations: 19

Results
- (gold) Gold: Canada; Glen Dexter; Andreas Josenhans; Sandy McMillan
- (silver) Silver: Denmark; Valdemar Bandolowski; Jørgen Lindhasten; Erik Hermann Hansen
- (bronze) Bronze: Brazil; Gastão Brun; Vicente Brun; Roberto Martins

Only the top 10 boats are documented.

Rank	Country	Helmsman	Crew	Sail No.	Race 1		Race 2		Race 3		Race 4		Race 5		Race 6		Race 7		Total	Total – discard
Rank	Country	Helmsman	Crew	Sail No.	Pos.	Pts.	Pos.	Pts.	Pos.	Pts.	Pos.	Pts.	Pos.	Pts.	Pos.	Pts.	Pos.	Pts.	Total	Total – discard
1st place, gold medalist(s)	CAN	Glen Dexter	Andreas Josenhans; Sandy McMillan	KC 132	15	21.0	4	8.0	~~16~~	~~22.0~~	1	0.0	3	5.7	13	19	3	5.7	81.4	59.4
2nd place, silver medalist(s)	DEN	Valdemar Bandolowski	Jørgen Lindhasten; Erik Hermann Hansen	D 73	~~29~~	~~35.0~~	11	17.0	2	3.0	5	10.0	17	23.0	5	10.0	7	13.0	111.0	76.0
3rd place, bronze medalist(s)	BRA	Gastão Brun	Vicente Brun; Roberto Martins	BL 15	9	15.0	~~DSQ~~	~~67.0~~	1	0.0	2	3.0	26	32.0	12	18.0	5	10.0	145.0	78.0
4	CAN	Peter Hall	Not documented	KC 127	2	3.0	15	21.0	~~28~~	~~34.0~~	20	26.0	11	18.0	14	20.0	1	0.0	121.0	87.0
5	USA	Buddy Melges	Not documented	US 680	1	0.0	19	25.0	19	25.0	15	21.0	8	14.0	~~DNF~~	~~67.0~~	4	8.0	160.0	93.0
6	CAN	Hans Fogh	Not documented	KC 143	5	10.0	7	13.0	4	8.0	14	20.0	12	18.0	~~DSQ~~	~~67.0~~	18	24.0	160.0	93.0
7	URS	Boris Budnikov	Not documented	SR 16	4	8.0	22	28.0	~~DSQ~~	~~67.0~~	23	29.0	7	13.0	2	3.0	16	22.0	170.0	103.0
8	CAN	Bill Abbott Jr.	Bill Abbott Sr. Not documented	KC 1	6	11.7	17	23.0	3	5.7	~~21~~	~~27.0~~	13	19.0	11	17.0	21	27.0	130.4	103.4
9	GER	Willi Kuhweide	Not documented	G 185	3	5.7	1	0.0	49	55.0	6	11.7	6	11.7	18	24.0	~~DNF~~	~~67.0~~	175.1	108.1
10	GER	Fritz Geis	Not documented	G 192	~~23~~	~~29.0~~	6	11.7	23	29.0	19	23.0	36	42.0	1	0.0	8	14.0	150.7	108.7

Legend: DNF – Did not finish; DNS – Did not start; DSQ – Disqualified;
Discard is crossed out and does not count for the overall result.

- 1977 Progress

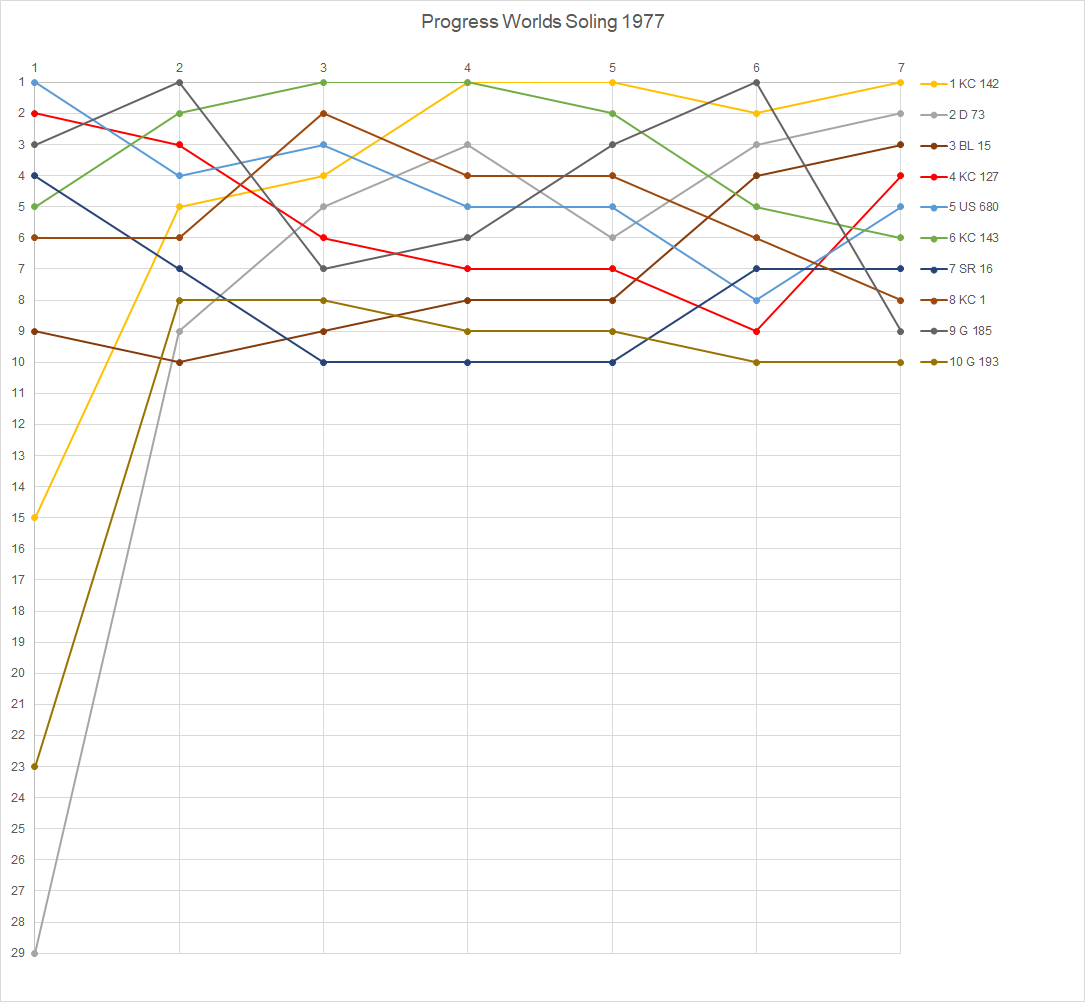

== 1978 Final results ==
1978
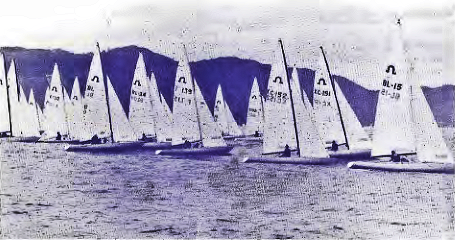

Event title
- Edition: 10,
- Host: Iate Clube do Rio de Janeiro

Event details
- Venue: Rio de Janeiro, Brazil
- Dates: 22 Feb – 5 Mar 1978
- Yachts: 48
- Key people: Cornelia Buckup and Angela Brun (Organization); George Lothar (Race management); Mario Simoes (Measurement); Jack Van Dyke (Chairman of the Jury); Ken Berkeley, Duarte Bello, Harry Adler, Walter von Hütschler and Peter Siemsen (Jury members); Elizabeth Young (Secretary of the Jury)
- Opening ceremony: 24 Feb 1978

Competitors
- Competitors: 144
- Competing nations: 15

Results
- (gold) Gold: Brazil; Gastão Brun; Vicente Brun; Roberto Martins
- (silver) Silver: Canada; Glen Dexter; Andreas Josenhans; Sandy McMillan
- (bronze) Bronze: Canada; Hans Fogh; John Kerr; Dennis Toews

Only total but no detailed results are documented.

Rank	Country	Helmsman	Crew	Sail No.	Total – discard
1st place, gold medalist(s)	Brazil	Gastão Brun	Vicente Brun; Roberto Martins	BL 15	40.70
2nd place, silver medalist(s)	Canada	Glen Dexter	Andreas Josenhans; Sandy McMillan	KC 149	42.0
3rd place, bronze medalist(s)	Canada	Hans Fogh	John Kerr; Dennis Toews	KC 151	49.7
4	Great Britain	Phil Crebbin	Not documented	K 128	60.0
5	West Germany	Willi Kuhweide	Not documented	G 185	67.4
6	West Germany	Fritz Geis	Not documented	G 192	67.4
7	France	Patrick Haegeli	Not documented	F 132	71.4
8	Denmark	Valdemar Bandelowski	Not documented	D 73	77.7
9	Sweden	Stig Wennerstrom	Not documented	S 115	88.0
10	Brazil	Axel Schmidt	Not documented	BL 42	88.7
11	Sweden	Arved von Gruenewaldt	Not documented	S 83	92.7
12	Canada	Peter Hall	Not documented	KC 147	104.0
13	Canada	Bill Abbott Jr.	Bill Abbott Sr. Not documented	KC 1	109.7
14	Sweden	Jörgen Sundelin	Not documented	S 105	111.0
15	Brazil	Eduardo de Souza	Not documented	BL 33	130.0
16	Italy	Fabio Albarelli	Not documented	I 159	131.0
17	Netherlands	Geert Bakker	Not documented	H 17	134.0
18	Canada	Fredrick Hill	Not documented	KC 152	134.7
19	West Germany	Karl Heist	Not documented	G 178	136.0
20	Brazil	Augusto Barrozo	Not documented	BL 20	137.0
21	Brazil	Fernando Nabuco	Not documented	BL 32	141.0
22	Sweden	Erik Thorsell	Not documented	S 102	150.0
23	France	Alain Forgeot	Not documented	F 139	162.7
24	Great Britain	Kit Hobday	Not documented	K 130	169.0
25	Australia	Dallas Dempster	Not documented	KA 124	170.0
26	Brazil	Mario Innecco	Not documented	BL 10	188.0
27	West Germany	Klaus Schaffers	Not documented	G 187	191.0
28	West Germany	Klaus Mahrt	Not documented	G 196	191.0
29	France	René Sence	Not documented	F 134	206.0
30	Brazil	Antonio Figuciredo	Not documented	BL 25	207.0
31	Italy	Leonarda Fava	Not documented	I 139	208.0
32	Argentina	Jorge Vago	Not documented	A 5	211.0
33	Norway	Kalle Nergaard	Not documented	N 87	213.0
34	West Germany	Hans Berkes	Not documented	G 199	215.0
35	Argentina	Claudio Fassardi	Not documented	A 3	223.0
36	Brazil	Ernesto Reibel	Not documented	BL 30	227.0
37	Puerto Rico	Eric Tulla	Not documented	PR 2	227.0
38	Brazil	Carlos Wanderley	Not documented	BL 34	242.0
39	Argentina	Jusio Frazer	Not documented	A 11	249.0
40	Japan	Shinichi Ishibashi	Not documented	J 27	255.0
41	Brazil	Clovis Puperi	Not documented	BL 16	259.0
42	Great Britain	Tony Claire	Not documented	K 106	264.0
43	Brazil	Jonas Penteado	Not documented	BL 31	265.0
44	Argentina	Jorge Pochat	Not documented	A 4	268.0
45	Brazil	Mauro Lobo	Not documented	BL 6	280.0
46	Argentina	Juan Zuccoli	Not documented	A 7	290.0
47	Switzerland	Walter Riesen	Not documented	Z 170	298.0
48	Argentina	Castro Guillermo	Not documented	A 22	312.0

- 1978 Progress

Not enouch data to generate

== 1979 Final results ==
1979
Event title
- Edition: 11,

Event details
- Venue: Visby, Sweden
- Yachts: 59

Competitors
- Competitors: 177

Results
- (gold) Gold: United States; Robbie Haines; Rod Davis; Ed Trevelyan
- (silver) Silver: Denmark; Poul Richard Høj Jensen; Crew not documented
- (bronze) Bronze: Sweden; Stig Wennerström; Stefan Krook; Lennart Roslund

Only the top 20 boats are documented.

Rank	Country	Helmsman	Crew	Sail No.	Race 1		Race 2		Race 3		Race 4		Race 5		Race 6		Race 7		Total	Total – discard
Rank	Country	Helmsman	Crew	Sail No.	Pos.	Pts.	Pos.	Pts.	Pos.	Pts.	Pos.	Pts.	Pos.	Pts.	Pos.	Pts.	Pos.	Pts.	Total	Total – discard
1st place, gold medalist(s)	USA	Robbie Haines	Rod Davis; Ed Trevelyan	US 707	3	5.7	13	19.0	~~28~~	~~34.0~~	2	3.0	4	8.0	1	0.0	2	3.0	72.7	38.7
2nd place, silver medalist(s)	DEN	Poul Richard Høj Jensen	Not documented	D 75	8	14.0	1	0.0	~~27~~	~~33.0~~	18	24.0	3	5.7	15	21.0	3	5.7	103.4	70.4
3rd place, bronze medalist(s)	SWE	Stig Wennerström	Stefan Krook; Lennart Roslund	S 115	17	23.0	7	13.0	1	0.0	9	15.0	10	16.0	6	11.7	~~28~~	~~34.0~~	112.7	78.7
4	USA	Buddy Melges	Not documented	US 700	6	11.7	~~30~~	~~36.0~~	11	17.0	4	8.0	2	3.0	28	34.0	9	15.0	124.7	88.7
5	CAN	Peter Hall	Not documented	KC 163	16	22.0	6	11.7	17	23.0	~~33~~	~~39.0~~	5	10.0	5	10.0	7	13.0	128.7	89.7
6	URS	Boris Budnikov	Not documented	SR 24	26	32.0	11	17.0	10	16.0	~~30~~	~~36.0~~	12	18.0	2	3.0	6	11.7	133.7	97.7
7	NOR	Odd Roar Lofterød	Bjørn Lofterød; Not documented	N 93	~~38~~	~~44.0~~	22	28.0	33	39.0	10	16.0	1	0.0	12	18.0	4	8.0	153.0	109.0
8	NED	Geert Bakker	Dick Coster; Steven Bakker	H 17	~~43~~	~~49.0~~	26	32.0	2	3.0	22	28.0	7	13.0	10	16.0	18	24.0	165.0	116.0
9	FRG	Fritz Geis	Not documented	G 212	5	10.0	~~42~~	~~48.0~~	3	5.7	8	14.0	6	11.7	37	43.0	26	32.0	164.4	116.4
10	DEN	Valdemar Bandolowski	Not documented	D 77	1	0.0	32	38.0	~~45~~	~~51.0~~	13	19.0	24	30.0	8	14.0	11	17.0	169.0	118.0
11	FRA	Patrick Haegeli	Not documented	F 142	15	21.0	16	22.0	18	24.0	27	33.0	9	15.0	3	5.7	~~41~~	~~47.0~~	167.7	120.7
12	SWE	Erik Thorsell	Not documented	S 102	32	38.0	8	14.0	19	25.0	5	10.0	17	23.0	20	26.0	~~21~~	~~27.0~~	163.0	125.0
13	USA	Vicente Brun	Lowell North; Not documented	US 593	12	18.0	2	3.0	4	8.0	7	13.0	~~DSQ~~	~~66.0~~	13	19.0	DSQ	66.0	193.0	127.0
14	CAN	Hans Fogh	Not documented	KC 161	23	29.0	24	30.0	6	11.7	17	23.0	13	19.0	11	17.0	~~34~~	~~40.0~~	169.7	129.7
15	AUS	John Bertrand	Not documented	KA 150	18	24.0	19	25.0	30	36.0	3	5.7	~~DNF~~	~~66.0~~	35	41.0	1	0.0	197.7	131.7
16	GDR	Wolf Richter	Not documented	GO 5	13	19.0	21	27.0	12	18.0	~~38~~	~~44.0~~	29	35.0	19	25.0	5	10.0	178.0	134.0
17	CAN	Glen Dexter	Not documented	KC 149	19	25.0	17	23.0	~~26~~	~~32.0~~	23	29.0	15	21.0	16	22.0	22	28.0	180.0	148.0
18	CAN	Bill Abbott Jr.	Bill Abbott Sr. Not documented	KC 1	34	40.0	5	10.0	~~43~~	~~49.0~~	15	21.0	30	36.0	21	27.0	14	20.0	203.0	154.0
19	SWE	Jan Andersson	Bertil Larsson; Göran Andersson	S 118	14	20.0	41	47.0	9	15.0	12	18.0	25	31.0	22	28.0	36	42.0	201.0	154.0
20	FIN	Matti Jokinen	Not documented	L 42	2	3.0	31	37.0	~~46~~	~~52.0~~	11	17.0	46	52.0	25	31.0	10	16.0	208.0	156.0

Legend: DNF – Did not finish; DNS – Did not start; DSQ – Disqualified;
Discard is crossed out and does not count for the overall result.

- 1979 Progress

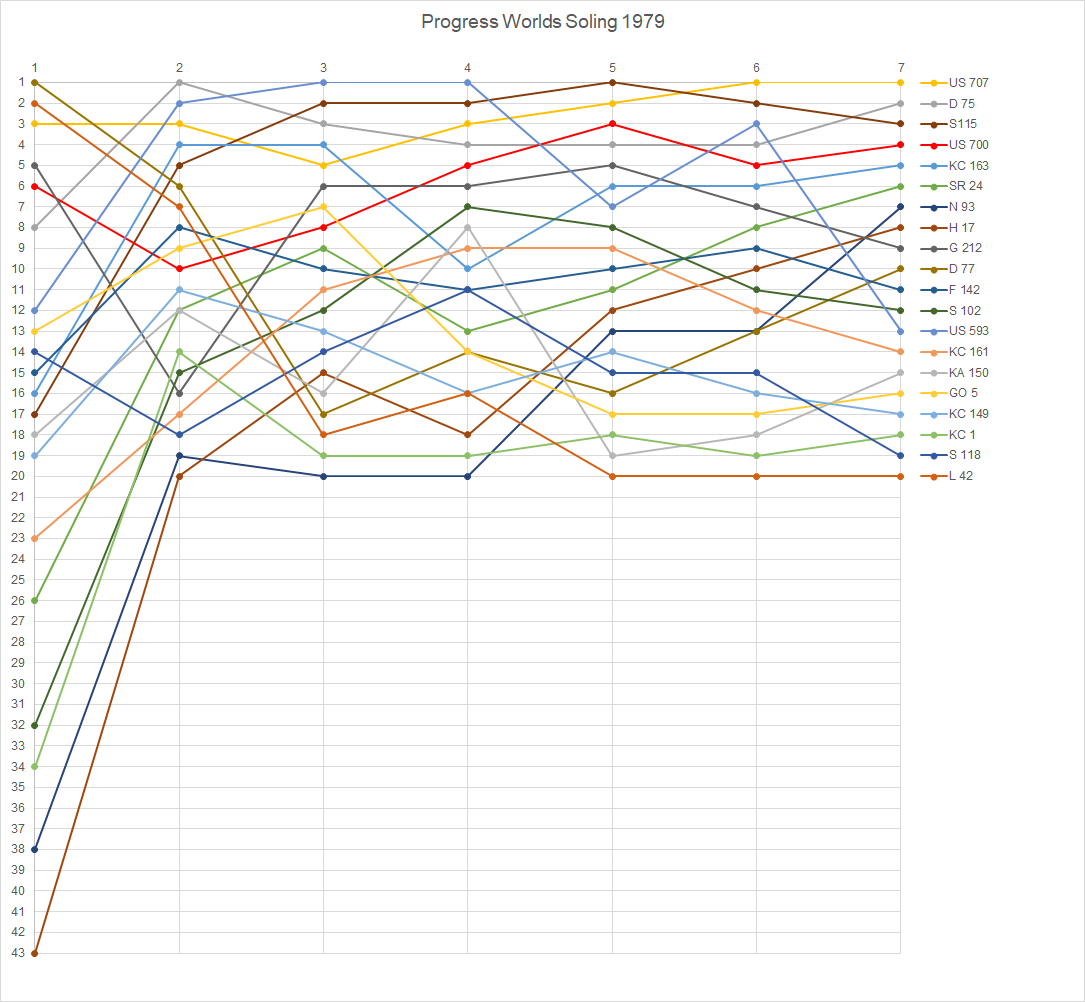

== Further results ==
For further results see:

- Soling World Championship results (1969–1979)
- Soling World Championship results (1980–1984)
- Soling World Championship results (1985–1989)
- Soling World Championship results (1990–1994)
- Soling World Championship results (1995–1999)
- Soling World Championship results (2000–2009)
- Soling World Championship results (2010–2019)
- Soling World Championship results (2020–2029)
