= Soling World Championship =

International sailing regatta in the Soling

The Soling World Championship is an International sailing regatta in the Soling organized by the host club on behalf of the International Soling Association and recognised by World Sailing. The first Soling World Championship were held in Copenhagen in 1969, the year after the selection as Olympic Three-Men Keelboat for the 1972 Summer Olympics. The Soling was an Olympic class from 1972 to 2000.

== Editions ==
| Event | | | Host | | | Boats | Sailor | | | | | Ref. |
| Ed. | Date | Year | Host club | City | Country | Boats | No. | | | Nat. | Cont. | Ref. |
|---|---|---|---|---|---|---|---|---|---|---|---|---|
| 1 | - | 1969 | Royal Danish Yacht Club | Hellerup | Denmark | 87 | 261 | | | 17 | | |
| 2 | 9-16 Jun | 1970 | | Poole | United Kingdom | | | | | | | |
| 3 | 25 Sep -1 Oct | 1971 | Seawanhaka Corinthian Yacht Club | Centre Island, Oyster Bay, New York | United States | | | | | | | |
| N/A | | 1972 | Not held due to the Olympic Games | | | | | | | | | |
| 4 | 17–28 May | 1973 | | Quiberon | France | | | | | | | |
| 5 | 26 Jan - 3 Feb | 1974 | Royal Prince Alfred Yacht Club | Newport, NSW | Australia | 38 | 114 | | | 16+ | 6+ | |
| 6 | 1-9 Aug | 1975 | Chicago Yacht Club, Belmont | Chicago | United States | 62 | 186 | | | 18+ | 5+ | |
| N/A | | 1976 | Not held due to the Olympic Games | | | | | | | | | |
| 7 | 1-11 Jan | 1977 | Hankø Yacht Club | Hankø, Østfold | Norway | +49 | | | | 19 | 6 | |
| 8 | 22 Feb - 5 Mar | 1978 | Iate Clube do Rio de Janeiro | Rio de Janeiro | Brazil | 48 | 144 | | | 16+ | 5+ | |
| 9 | 1-11 Aug | 1979 | | Visby | Sweden | 59 | 177 | | | 4+ | 1+ | |
| 10 | 15-26 Jan | 1980 | Club Náutico de Ponce | Ponce | Puerto Rico | 38 | 114 | | | 14+ | 3+ | |
| 11 | 6–16 May | 1981 | | Anzio | Italy | 59 | 177 | | | 12+ | 4+ | |
| 12 | 8-18 Mar | 1982 | Fremantle Sailing Club | Fremantle, Western Australia | Australia | 40 | 120 | | | 11+ | 3+ | |
| 13 | 10-23 Jul | 1983 | St. Francis Yacht Club | Berkeley, San Francisco, California | United States | 54 | 162 | | | 16+ | 5+ | |
| 14 | 15-25 Sep | 1984 | Circolo Vela Torbole | Nago–Torbole, Lake Garda | Italy | 64 | 192 | | | 19+ | 3+ | |
| 15 | 5-17 Sep | 1985 | Sarnia Yacht Club | Point Edward, Ontario | Canada | 39 | 117 | | | 0+ | 0+ | |
| 16 | 4-14 Sep | 1986 | Societe Nautique de La Trinite-sur-Mer | La Trinité-sur-Mer, Morbihan | France | 78 | 234 | | | 0+ | 0+ | |
| 17 | 14-20 Jun | 1987 | Kieler Yacht Club | Kiel | Germany | 86 | 258 | | | 27+ | 5+ | |
| 18 | 6-12 Jan | 1988 | Royal Melbourne Yacht Squadron | St Kilda, Victoria | Australia | 46 | 138 | | | 16+ | 4+ | |
| 19 | - | 1989 | Balatonfüredi Yacht Club | Lake Balaton | Hungary | 79 | 237 | | | 21+ | 3+ | |
| 20 | 16-26 Aug | 1990 | Royal Yacht Club Hollandia | Medemblik | Netherlands | 66 | 198 | | | 25+ | 5+ | |
| 21 | 22-30 Aug | 1991 | | Rochester, New York | United States | 70 | 210 | | | 17+ | 4+ | |
| 22 | 21-26 Mar | 1992 | | Cádiz | Spain | 60 | 180 | | | 19+ | 4+ | |
| 23 | 4-11 Sep | 1993 | | Phalaron | Greece | 46 | 138 | | | 18+ | 4+ | |
| 24 | 2-8 Jul | 1994 | | Helsinki | Finland | 67 | 201 | | | 23+ | 5+ | |
| 25 | 12-18 Aug | 1995 | | Kingston, Ontario | Canada | 58 | 174 | | | 21+ | 6+ | |
| 26 | 24-30 Mar | 1996 | | Punta Ala | Italy | 63 | 189 | | | 24+ | 6+ | |
| 27 | 19-26 Jul | 1997 | | Copenhagen | Denmark | 58 | 174 | | | 22+ | 5+ | |
| 28 | 31Aug -5Sep | 1998 | Milwaukee Yacht Club | Milwaukee | United States | 67 | 201 | | | 25+ | 5+ | |
| 29 | 6-17 Jan | 1999 | | Melbourne | Argentina | 38 | 114 | | | 20+ | 5+ | |
| 30 | 30Mar -14Apr | 2000 | Puedo Tomas Maestre | La Manga, Murcia, Murcia | Spain | 41 | 123 | | | 3+ | 2+ | |
| 31 | 15-24 Nov | 2001 | Club Náutico San Isidro | San Isidro, Buenos Aires | Argentina | 35 | 105 | | | 8+ | 2+ | |
| 32 | 23-29 Sep | 2002 | Eastern Yacht Club, Marblehead | Marblehead, Massachusetts | United States | 24 | 72 | 70 | 2 | 10 | 3 | |
| 33 | 18–25 May | 2003 | Hungarian Yachting Association | Balatonfüred, Lake Balaton | Hungary | 40 | 120 | 117 | 3 | 12 | 3 | |
| 34 | 21-31 Jan | 2004 | Veleiros So Sul | Porto Alegre | Brazil | 25 | 75 | | | 6+ | 3+ | |
| 35 | 20–27 May | 2005 | Club Velico Castiglione della Pescaia | Castiglione della Pescaia | Italy | 43 | 129 | | | 13+ | 3+ | |
| 36 | 16-22 Oct | 2006 | Severn Sailing Association | Annapolis, Maryland | United States | 37 | 111 | 104 | 7 | 11 | 3 | |
| 37 | 16-24 Nov | 2007 | Club Náutico San Isidro | San Isidro, Buenos Aires | Argentina | 34 | 102 | 98 | 4 | 11 | 3 | |
| 38 | 13-19 Sep | 2008 | Club Nautico Scarlino | Puntone di Scarlino, Tuscany | Italy | 40 | 120 | | | 17+ | 3+ | |
| 39 | 10-18 Sep | 2009 | Etobicoke Yacht Club | Etobicoke, Toronto, Ontario | Canada | 24 | 72 | 65 | 7 | 7 | 3 | |
| 40 | 5-13 Feb | 2010 | Veleiros So Sul | Porto Alegre | Brazil | 20 | 60 | | | 5+ | 3+ | |
| 41 | 22-30 Apr | 2011 | Chiemsee Yacht Club | Chiemsee, Bavaria | Germany | 49 | 147 | | | 14+ | 3+ | |
| 42 | 17-23 Sep | 2012 | Milwaukee Yacht Club | Milwaukee | United States | 30 | 90 | | | 10+ | 4+ | |
| 43 | 19-23 Sep | 2013 | Balatonfüredi Yacht Club | Lake Balaton | Hungary | 31 | 93 | | | 14+ | 4+ | |
| 44 | 22-30 Nov | 2014 | Yacht Club Punta del Este | Punta del Este | Uruguay | 27 | 81 | 79 | 2 | 7 | 3 | |
| 45 | 22–28 May | 2015 | Club Velico Castiglione della Pescaia | Castiglione della Pescaia | Italy | 45 | 135 | 132 | 3 | 14 | 3 | |
| 46 | 10-17 Sep | 2016 | Kingston Yacht Club | Kingston, Ontario | Canada | 24 | 72 | 67 | 5 | 8 | 3 | |
| 47 | 16-22 Sep | 2017 | Royal Dutch Sailing and Rowing Association, Muiden | Muiden | Netherlands | 35 | 105 | 99 | 6 | 13 | 3 | |
| 48 | 15-22 Nov | 2018 | Club Náutico San Isidro | San Isidro, Buenos Aires | Argentina | 20 | 60 | 60 | 0 | 9 | 3 | |
| 49 | 21-27 Sep | 2019 | Yacht Club de La Baule | La Baule-Escoublac | France | 38 | 114 | 110 | 4 | 15 | 3 | |
| N/A | 21-27 Sep | 2020 | Milwaukee Yacht Club | Milwaukee | United States | CANCELLED DUE TO COVID | | | | | | |
| N/A | 14-19 Sep | 2021 | Milwaukee Yacht Club | Milwaukee | United States | CANCELLED DUE TO COVID | | | | | | |
| 50 | 2–7 May | 2022 | Chiemsee Yacht Club | Chiemsee, Bavaria | Germany | 37 | 111 | 106 | 5 | 13 | 3 | |
| 51 | 17-23 Sep | 2023 | Milwaukee Yacht Club | Milwaukee | United States | 22 | 66 | 61 | 5 | 8 | 3 | |
| 52 | 24-30 Jun | 2024 | Hankø Yacht Club | Hankø, Østfold | Norway | 37 | 111 | | | 13+ | 3+ | |
| 53 | 16-23 Nov | 2025 | Veleiros do Sul | Porto Alegre | Argentina | 16 | 48 | 46 | 2 | 7 | 3 | |
| 54 | 10-16 May | 2026 | | Balatonfüred | Hungary | 30 | 91 | 88 | 3 | 12 | 3 | |

== Medalists ==
| Year | Gold | Silver | Bronze | Ref |
|---|---|---|---|---|
| 1969 | Denmark; Paul Elvstrøm; Niels Jensen; Poul Mik-Meyer | Sweden; Pelle Petterson; UNKNOWN; UNKNOWN | United States; Ding Schoonmaker; UNKNOWN; UNKNOWN | |
| 1970 | Sweden; Stig Wennerström; Stefan Krook; Jan Lybeck | United States; John Dane III; Mark LeBlanc; John Cerise | Great Britain; John Oakeley; UNKNOWN; UNKNOWN | |
| 1971 | United States; Bob Mosbacher; Thad Hutcheson; Tom Dickey | United States; Bruce Goldsmith; UNKNOWN; UNKNOWN | Denmark; Paul Elvstrøm; Valdemar Bandolowski; Niels Jensen | |
| 1972 | Not held due to Olympic Games | | | |
| 1973 | Denmark; Ib Ussing Andersen; Jørgen Lindhasten; Hans Winther | Denmark; Poul Richard Høj Jensen; UNKNOWN; UNKNOWN | Sweden; Stig Wennerström; Stefan Krook; Jan Lybeck | |
| 1974 | Paul Elvstrøm (DEN); Hans Fogh (DEN); Bruce McCurrach (RSA) | Australia; David Forbes; Denis O'Neil; John Anderson | Sweden; Arved von Grünewaldt; Tommy Nilsson; Hjalmar Schibbye | |
| 1975 | United States; Bill Buchan; Craig Thomas; Joe Golberg | United States; Buddy Melges; UNKNOWN; UNKNOWN | United States; John Kolius; Walter Glasgow; Richard Hoepfner | |
| 1976 | Not held due to Olympic Games | | | |
| 1977 | Canada; Glen Dexter; Andreas Josenhans; Sandy MacMillan | Denmark; Valdemar Bandolowski; Jørgen Lindhasten; Erik Hermann Hansen | Brazil; Gastão Brun; Vicente Brun; Roberto Martins | |
| 1978 | Brazil; Gastão Brun; Vicente Brun; Roberto Martins | Canada; Glen Dexter; Andreas Josenhans; Sandy MacMillan | Canada; Hans Fogh; John Kerr; Dennis Toews | |
| 1979 | United States; Robbie Haines; Rod Davis; Ed Trevelyan | Denmark; Poul Richard Høj Jensen; UNKNOWN; UNKNOWN | Stig Wennerström (SWE); Stefan Krook (SWE); Lennart Roslund (SWE) | |
| 1980 | Canada; Glen Dexter; Andreas Josenhans; Sandy MacMillan | United States; Robbie Haines; Rod Davis; Ed Trevelyan | United States; Buddy Melges; UNKNOWN; UNKNOWN | |
| 1981 | Vicente Brun (BRA); Gastão Brun (BRA); Steven Bakker (NED) | Greece; Tassos Boudouris; Antonios Bountouris; Dimitrios Deligiann | Italy; Gianluca Lamaro; Valerio Romano; Aurelio Dalla Vecchia | |
| 1982 | Australia; Mark Bethwaite; Ian McDiarmid; Glen Read | Australia; William Packer; Ian Campbell; Robert Hardy | United States; Dave Perry; Brad Dellenbaugh; Ed Travelyan | |
| 1983 | Robbie Haines (USA); Vicente Brun (BRA); Robert Kinney (USA) | United States; Dave Curtis; John Engel; Wally Corwin | Australia; Peter Gilmour; UNKNOWN; UNKNOWN | |
| 1984 | Valdemar Bandolowski (DEN); Steve Calder (CAN); Theis Palm (DEN) | Boris Budnikov (URS); Gennadi Strakh (SLO); Oleg Miron (URS) | East Germany; Helmar Nauck; Norbert Hellriegel; Sven Diedering | |
| 1985 | United States; Dave Curtis; John Engel; Wally Corwin | Brazil; Torben Grael; Daniel Adler; Ronaldo Senfft | United States; John Kosteckil; William Baylis; Robert Billingham | |
| 1986 | United States; John Kostecki; William Baylis; Robert Billingham | United States; David Curtis; John Engel; Wally Corwin | East Germany; Jochen Schümann; Thomas Flach; Bernd Jäkel | |
| 1987 | East Germany; Helmar Nauck; Norbert Hellriegel; Sven Diedering | United States; John Kostecki; William Baylis; Robert Billingham | Soviet Union; Georgy Shayduko; Nikolay Polyakov; Sergey Kanov | |
| 1988 | United States; John Kostecki; William Baylis; Bob Billingham | United States; Dave Curtis; Paul Murphy; Wally Corwin | Australia; Gary Sheard; Crew not documented | |
| 1989 | No champion decided due to insufficient wind conditions (less than 5 races) | | | |
| 1990 | France; Marc Bouet; Fabrice Levet; Alain Pointet | United States; Kevin Mahaney; James Brady; Douglas Kern | East Germany; Helmar Nauck; Norbert Hellriegel; Sven Diedering | |
| 1991 | United States; Larry Klein; Chris Redman; Ron Rosenberg | Germany; Jochen Schümann; Thomas Flach; Bernd Jäkel | United States; Kevin P. Mahaney; James Brady; Douglas Kern | |
| 1992 | Germany; Jochen Schümann; Thomas Flach; Bernd Jäkel | Denmark; Jesper Bank; Jesper Seier; Steen Secher | Sweden; Magnus Holmberg; Björn Alm; Johan Barne | |
| 1993 | Greece; Tassos Boudouris; Dimitrios Deligiannis; Leo Pelekanakis | Germany; Albert Batzill; Lang; Eddy Eich | Spain; Luis Doreste; Domingo Manrique; David Vera | |
| 1994 | Spain; Manuel Doreste; José Valades; Juan Galmes | Denmark; Jesper Bank; Kræn Nielsen; Thomas Jacobsen | United States; Jeff Madrigali; Kent Massey; James Barton | |
| 1995 | Spain; Luis Doreste; Domingo Manrique; David Vera | Sweden; Magnus Holmberg; Björn Alm; Johan Barne | United States; Matt Hayes; Stephen McConaghy; Barry Watson | |
| 1996 | Russia; Georgy Shayduko; Igor Skalin; Dmitri Shabanov | Italy; Mario Celon; Torboli; Nicola Celon | Germany; Jochen Schümann; Thomas Flach; Bernd Jäkel | |
| 1997 | No champion decided due to insufficient wind conditions (less than 5 races) | | | |
| 1998 | Russia; Georgy Shayduko; Sergey Volchkov; Pavel Komarov | Ukraine; Serhiy Pichuhin; Volodymyr Korotkov; Serhiy Timokhov | Italy; Paolo Cian; Pierluigi; Colannino | |
| 1999 | Denmark; Stig Westergaard; Jens Bojsen-Møller; Bjørn Westergaard | Germany; Jochen Schümann; Gunnar Bahr; Ingo Borkowski | Netherlands; Roy Heiner; Peter van Niekerk; Dirk de Ridder | |
| 2000 | United States; Jeff Madrigali; Hartwell Jordan; Craig Healy | Ukraine; Serhiy Pichuhin; Volodymyr Korotkov; Serhiy Timokhov | Sweden; Hans Wallén; Magnus Augustson; Johan Barne | |
| 2001 | Argentina; Gustavo Warburg; Hernán Celedoni; Maximo Smith | Argentina; Luis Cerrato; Federico Haymes Biedma; Fabio Scarpati | Argentina; Martín Busch; Pablo Noceti; Ismael Ayerza | |
| 2002 | Bill Abbott Jr. (CAN); Paul Davis (NOR); William Abbott (CAN) | United States; Dave Curtis; George Iverson; Ben Richardson | United States; Dave Franzel; Dave Carlson; Maximo Smith | |
| 2003 | Ukraine; Serhiy Pichuhin; Sergej Timostschow; Dmitri Jarowoj | Germany; Thomas Maschkiwitz; Christoph Sauerbier; Knut Seelig | Germany; Heiko Winkler; Stefan Wenzel; Jens Niemann | |
| 2004 | Argentina; Gustavo Warburg; Hernán Celedoni; Maximo Smith | Hungary; George Wossala; Leslie Kovacsi; Pepe Nemeth | Brazil; George Nehm; Marcos Pinto Ribeiro; Lucio Pinto Ribeiro | |
| 2005 | Germany; Roman Koch; Maxl Koch; Gregor Bornemann | Slovenia; Boštjan Antončič; Gennadi Strakh; Zeljko Perovic | Hungary; Balazs Gyenese; Gyula Mónus; Károly Vezér | |
| 2006 | Canada; Hans Fogh; Roger Cheer; Gordon Devries | Canada; Peter Hall; Philip Karrigan; Jay Deakin | Argentina; Gustavo Warburg; Maximo Smith; Miguel Lacour | |
| 2007 | Brazil; George Nehm; Marcos Pinto Ribeiro; Lucio Pinto Ribeiro | Brazil; Cicero Hartmann; Flávio Quevedo; Andre Renard | Argentina; Martin Busch; Tomas Peuvrel; Maximo Feldtmann | |
| 2008 | Slovenia; Boštjan Antončič; Gennadi Strakh; Karlo Hmeljak | Argentina; Gustavo Warburg; Hernán Celedoni; Maximo Smith | Argentina; Martin Busch; Tomas Peuvrel; Maximo Feldtmann | |
| 2009 | Bill Abbott Jr. (CAN); Paul Davis (NOR); Joanne Abbott (CAN) | Germany; Roman Koch; Maxl Koch; Gregor Bornemann | Canada; Peter Hall; Phillip Kerrigan; Gavin Flinn | |
| 2010 | Germany; Roman Koch; Maxl Koch; Gregor Bornemann | Argentina; Gustavo Warburg; Hernán Celedoni; Maximo Smith | Brazil; Cicero Hartmann; Flávio Quevedo; Andre Renard | |
| 2011 | Peter Hall (CAN); Paul Davis (NOR); William Hall (CAN) | Hungary; George Wossala; Károly Vezér; Pepe Nemeth | Brazil; Nelson Ilha; Paulo Lemos Ribeiro; Felipe Ilha | |
| 2012 | Peter Hall (CAN); Paul Davis (NOR); William Hall (CAN) | Canada; Hans Fogh; John Finch; Gordon Devries | Canada; Bill Abbott Jr. Joanne Abbott; Tom Freeman | |
| 2013 | Hungary; Farkas Litkey; Károly Vezér; Csaba Weinhardt | Peter Hall (CAN); Paul Davis (NOR); William Hall (CAN) | Brazil; Nelson Ilha; Felipe Ilha; Fernando Ilha | |
| 2014 | Peter Hall (CAN); Johan Offermans (NED); William Hall (CAN) | Brazil; Cicero Hartmann; Flávio Quevedo; Andre Renard | Argentina; Martin Busch; Eduardo Zimmermann; Maximo Feldtmann | |
| 2015 | Hungary; Farkas Litkey; Károly Vezér; Weinhardt Csaba | Canada; Bill Abbott Jr. Joanne Abbott; William Abbott | Austria; Florian Felzmann; Michael Felzmann; Margund Schuh | |
| 2016 | Bill Abbott Jr. (CAN); Joanne Abbott (CAN); Scott McNeill (USA) | Brazil; Nelson Ilha; Manfredo Florick; Gustavo Ilha | Canada; Thomas Fogh; Roger Cheer; Gord Devries | |
| 2017 | Hungary; Farkas Litkey; Károly Vezér; Gábor Oroszlán | Brazil; Nelson Ilha; Manfredo Flöricke; Carlo de Leo | Ukraine; Igor Yushko; Serhiy Pichuhin; Igor Severjanov | |
| 2018 | Argentina; Gustavo Warburg; Hernán Celedoni; Tomas Roldan | Brazil; Cicero Hartmann; Frederico Sidou; Andre Renard | Brazil; George Nehm; Marcos Pinto Ribeiro; Alexandre Mueller | |
| 2019 | Hungary; Farkas Litkey; Kristóf Joó; Pepe Nemeth | Brazil; Nelson Ilha; Manfredo Flöricke; Gustavo Ilha | Eki Heinonen (FIN); Gabor Helmhout (NED); Ties Verploegh (NED) | |
| 2020 | Postponed due to COVID-19 till 2021 | | | |
| 2021 | Postponed due to COVID-19 till 2023 | | | |
| 2022 | There was no wind and no race at all | | | |
| 2023 | BRA 73; Kadu Bergenthal (BRA); Vilnei Goldmeier (BRA); Edgar Oppitz (BRA) | CAN 1 William Abbott Jnr. (CAN); Joanne Abbott (CAN); Andrew Macrae (CAN) | CAN 225; Peter Hall (CAN); Scott McNeil (USA); William Hall (CAN) | |
| 2024 | HUN 11; Farkas Litkey (HUN); Károly Vezér (HUN); Kristóf Wossala (HUN) | BRA 78; Nelson Horn Ilha (BRA); Manfredo Floricke (BRA); Leonardo Mayhofer (BRA) | NOR 131; Kristian Nergaard (NOR); Johan Barne (SWE); Christen Horn Johannessen (NOR) | |
| 2025 | BRA-86 / Don’t Let Me Down; Cícero Hartmann (BRA); Frederico Sidou (BRA); Regis Silva (BRA) | BRA-78 / Equilibrium; Nelson Horn Ilha (BRA); Manfredo Flöricke (BRA); Leonardo Mayrhofer (BRA) | BRA-73 / Ico Carioba; Kadu Bergenthal (BRA); Vilnei Goldmeier (BRA); Edgar Ferreira Oppitz (BRA) | |
| 2026 | HUN-11 Process Solutions - Marietta; Farkas Litkey (HUN); Károly Vezér (HUN); Kristóf Wossala (HUN) | GER-339 Tuna; Donald Lippert (GER); Sven Rikwald (GER); Tim Giesecke (GER) | AUT-7 Fatboy; Florian Felzmann (AUT); Micheal Felzmann (AUT); Stephan Beurle (AUT) | |

== Multiple World Champions ==
| Position | Sailor | Gold | Silver | Bronze | Total | Entry(1) |
| 1 | Farkas Litkey (HUN) | 6 | 0 | 0 | 6 | 8 |
| 2 | Karoly Vezer (HUN) | 5 | 2 | 1 | 8 | 32 |
| 3 | Paul Davis (NOR) | 4 | 1 | 0 | 5 | 14 |
| 4 | Peter Hall (CAN) | 3 | 2 | 2 | 7 | 24 |
| 5 | William Abbott Jnr. (CAN) | 3 | 2 | 1 | 6 | 30 |
| 5 | Gustavo Warburg (ARG) | 3 | 2 | 1 | 6 | 14 |
| 7 | Hernán Celedoni (ARG) | 3 | 2 | 0 | 5 | 8 |
| 8 | Vincente D'Avila Melo Brun (BRA) | 3 | 0 | 1 | 4 | 5 |
| 9 | Joanne Abbott (CAN) | 2 | 2 | 1 | 5 | 11 |
| 9 | Maximo Smith (ARG) | 2 | 2 | 1 | 5 | 7 |
| 11 | Hans Fogh (CAN) | 2 | 1 | 1 | 4 | 22 |
| 11 | William Hall (CAN) | 2 | 1 | 1 | 4 | 8 |
| 11 | William Baylis (USA) | 2 | 1 | 1 | 4 | 4 |
| 11 | Robert Billingham (USA) | 2 | 1 | 1 | 4 | 4 |
| 11 | John Kostecki (USA) | 2 | 1 | 1 | 4 | 4 |
| 16 | Roman Koch (GER) | 2 | 1 | 0 | 3 | 22 |
| 16 | Maxl Koch (GER) | 2 | 1 | 0 | 3 | 17 |
| 16 | Gregor Bornemann (GER) | 2 | 1 | 0 | 3 | 14 |
| 16 | Robert Haines Jnr. (USA) | 2 | 1 | 0 | 3 | 3 |
| 16 | Andreas Josenhans (CAN) | 2 | 1 | 0 | 3 | 3 |
| 16 | Alexander (Sandy) Macmillan (CAN) | 2 | 1 | 0 | 3 | 3 |
| 16 | Glenn Dexter (CAN) | 2 | 1 | 0 | 3 | 5 |
| 23 | Georgy Shayduko (RUS) | 2 | 0 | 1 | 3 | 5 |
| 23 | Gastao D'Avila Melo Brun (BRA) | 2 | 0 | 1 | 3 | 4 |
| 23 | Paul Elvstrøm (DEN) | 2 | 0 | 1 | 3 | 3 |
| 26 | Csaba Weinhard (HUN) | 2 | 0 | 0 | 2 | 2 |

(1) This is the number of entries into the world championships including the masters made by the sailor. It is an under estimations as full results for all years are not known.

== See also ==
- Soling Masters World Championship
- Soling World Championship
  - Soling World Championship results (1969–1979)
  - Soling World Championship results (1980–1984)
  - Soling World Championship results (1985–1989)
  - Soling World Championship results (1990–1994)
