= The Flower Girl (disambiguation) =

The Flower Girl is a North Korean revolutionary genre theatrical performance.

The Flower Girl may also refer to:

- The Flower Girl (Murillo), 17th-century painting
- The Flower Girl (Ingham), 1846 painting
- The Flower Girl (Shannon), 1900 painting by James Jebusa Shannon
- "(I Love) The Flower Girl", another name for "The Rain, the Park & Other Things", a 1967 song by The Cowsills

== See also ==
- The Flower Girl of Potsdam Square, a 1925 German silent comedy film
- Flower girl
- Flower girl (disambiguation)
