= 2011 Soling World Championship =

The 2011 Soling World Championships were held in Prien am Chiemsee, Germany between April 22 and 30, 2011. The hosting yacht club was Chiemsee Yacht Club.

== Results ==
Results of individual races
| Pos | Crew | Country | I | II | III | IV | V | VI | VII | VIII | Tot | Pts |
|---|---|---|---|---|---|---|---|---|---|---|---|---|
| Gold medal | Peter Hall (H); Paul Davis; Phillip Kerrigan | Canada | 1 | 12^{†} | 4 | 2 | 12 | 1 | 8 | 1 | 41 | 29 |
| Silver medal | Georg Wossala (H); Karoly Vezer; Peter Németh | Hungary | 17^{†} | 1 | 2 | 9 | 2 | 4 | 5 | 7 | 47 | 30 |
| Bronze medal | Nelson Ilha (H); Paulo Ribeiro; Filipe Ilha | Brazil | 11 | 7 | 6 | 11 | 25^{†} | 9 | 1 | 2 | 72 | 47 |
| 4 | Roman Koch (H); Maxl Koch; Georg Bornemann | Germany | 4 | 4 | 5 | 24 | 28^{†} | 2 | 2 | 11 | 80 | 52 |
| 5 | Gustavo Warburg (H); Alejandro Bisbal; Tomas Roldan | Argentina | 6 | 2 | 21^{†} | 1 | 7 | 13 | 10 | 14 | 74 | 53 |
| 6 | Rudy den Outer (H); Gavin Lidlow; Ramzi Souli | Netherlands | 25^{†} | 11 | 8 | 15 | 8 | 8 | 6 | 4 | 85 | 60 |
| 7 | Hans Fogh (H); John Finch; Gord Devries | Canada | 5 | 13 | 15^{†} | 14 | 10 | 5 | 15 | 8 | 85 | 70 |
| 8 | Guilherme Roth (H); Marcos Ribeiro; Lucio Ribeiro | Brazil | 19 | 8 | 3 | 12 | 20^{†} | 12 | 11 | 6 | 91 | 71 |
| 9 | Karl Haist (H); Max Haist; Johann Lindner | Germany | 7 | 5 | 9 | 18 | 13 | 10 | 21^{†} | 12 | 95 | 74 |
| 10 | Thomas Maschkiwitz (H); Christoph Wossala; Stefan Wenzel | Germany | 39 | 3 | 1 | 51^{†} OCS | 16 | 3 | 12 | 3 | 128 | 77 |
| 11 | Thomas Scherer (H); Andreas Baumüller; Jens Thoma | Germany | 20^{†} | 6 | 13 | 5 | 17 | 16 | 3 | 17 | 97 | 77 |
| 12 | Bostjan Antoncic (H); Gennadi Strakh; Mitja Nevecny | Slovenia | 3 | 22^{†} | 7 | 17 | 21 | 20 | 4 | 9 | 103 | 81 |
| 13 | Uwe Steingroß (H); Karsten Eller; Tim Giesecke | Germany | 12 | 17 | 17 | 51^{†} OCS | 1 | 7 | 18 | 10 | 133 | 82 |
| 14 | Fritz Geis (H); Richard Fricke; Karl Fricke | Germany | 2 | 14 | 11 | 3 | 15 | 21 | 51^{†} DSQ | 16 | 133 | 82 |
| 15 | Alex Hasch (H); Christian Holler; Markus Gnan | Austria | 37^{†} | 21 | 16 | 7 | 5 | 14 | 9 | 13 | 122 | 85 |
| 16 | Holger Weichert (H); Laurent Scheel; Martin Setzkorn | Germany | 28 | 10 | 12 | 19 | 9 | 11 | 7 | 51^{†} OCS | 147 | 96 |
| 17 | Johan Offermans (H); Berend Vree; Ben Medendorp | Netherlands | 29^{†} | 15 | 10 | 29 | 18 | 15 | 13 | 5 | 134 | 105 |
| 18 | Bram Soethoudt (H); Geert Verheij; Robin Segaar | Netherlands | 22 | 9 | 18 | 27^{†} | 14 | 17 | 14 | 23 | 144 | 117 |
| 19 | Frank Lavrsen (H); Mogens Jorgensen; Jacob Andersen | Denmark | 8 | 23 | 25 | 26 | 31^{†} | 6 | 16 | 15 | 150 | 119 |
| 20 | Johannes Glitzky (H); Volker Stoof; Rikwald | Germany | 9 | 16 | 19 | 20 | 43^{†} | 19 | 24 | 24 | 174 | 131 |
| 21 | Suzanne Retzlaff-Steingross (H); Gunnar Friedrich; Benjamin Steingross | Germany | 27 | 20 | 20 | 16 | 11 | 26 | 37^{†} | 19 | 176 | 139 |
| 22 | Ludwig Beurle (H); Christian Fischer; Ekkehart Steinhuner | Austria | 15 | 27 | 22 | 28^{†} | 3 | 18 | 27 | 28 | 168 | 140 |
| 23 | Charles Kamps (H); Stephen Bobo; Toby Kamps | United States | 41^{†} | 26 | 39 | 10 | 4 | 22 | 20 | 22 | 184 | 143 |
| 24 | Heino Schuckmann (H); Dominik Meissner; Markus Stallhofer | Germany | 18 | 24 | 35^{†} | 6 | 27 | 31 | 19 | 18 | 178 | 143 |
| 25 | Michael Dietzel (H); Anna Dietzel; Fischer-Brandies | Germany | 10 | 29 | 51^{†} DSQ | 13 | 22 | 25 | 26 | 20 | 196 | 145 |
| 26 | Augustin Nottebohm (H); Santiago Nottebohm; Guillermo Parodi | Argentina | 23 | 19 | 30 | 4 | 6 | 24 | 51^{†} DNC | 51; DNC | 208 | 157 |
| 27 | Winfried Geisler (H); Björn Geisler; Sven Dömges | Germany | 14 | 18 | 28 | 22 | 37^{†} | 23 | 31 | 29 | 202 | 165 |
| 28 | Matias Collins (H); Max Koch, Jr. Saemmer Tassilo | United States | 21 | 38^{†} | 24 | 31 | 32 | 28 | 23 | 25 | 222 | 184 |
| 29 | Matthias Dulce (H); Dieter Meusinger; Eberhard Franke | Germany | 24 | 51^{†} DNF | 26 | 25 | 26 | 29 | 32 | 27 | 240 | 189 |
| 30 | Gernot Heller (H); Gerd Auerswald; Valentin Koch | Germany | 16 | 33 | 27 | 21 | 29 | 39^{†} | 36 | 30 | 231 | 192 |
| 31 | Henri Lefevre (H); Eduard Lefevre; Marc Lefevre | France | 34 | 28 | 14 | 51^{†} OCS | 19 | 27 | 22 | 51; DNC | 246 | 195 |
| 32 | Tom Mitchell (H); Francisco Perez; Ed Berkhout | Canada | 38 | 40^{†} | 23 | 23 | 40 | 34 | 17 | 26 | 241 | 201 |
| 33 | Christian Mack (H); Bernd Heiling; Thomas Fabry | Germany | 13 | 31 | 29 | 34 | 24 | 35 | 51^{†} DNC | 51; DNC | 268 | 217 |
| 34 | Yves Steff (H); Bruno Gerard; Yves Allein | France | 31 | 51^{†} DNF | 33 | 36 | 23 | 30 | 33 | 33 | 270 | 219 |
| 35 | Michele Tognozzi (H); Mattia Rotelli; Riccardo Nappi | Italy | 45 | 25 | 31 | 30 | 33 | 33 | 25 | 51^{†} DNC | 273 | 222 |
| 36 | Stefan Barie (H); Dieter Lewin; Frank Gundlach | Germany | 33 | 39 | 34 | 33 | 30 | 32 | 30 | 51^{†} DNC | 282 | 231 |
| 37 | Istvan Szücs (H); Gabor Gyulai; Peter Szucs | Hungary | 42 | 32 | 29 | 42^{†} SCP | 41 | 40 | 28 | 21 | 275 | 233 |
| 38 | Francois Gombeaud (H); Christian Jozan; Philippe Jozan | Norway | 46^{†} | 35 | 36 | 32 | 35 | 36 | 34 | 34 | 288 | 242 |
| 39 | Domenico Carducci (H); Leonardo Saletti; Matteo Maiano | Italy | 35 | 30 | 32 | 8 | 51^{†} DSQ | 38 | 51; DNC | 51; DNC | 296 | 245 |
| 40 | Pierre Cocqueraumont (H); Clement Freour; Carolina Gutjahr | France | 26 | 34 | 43 | 45^{†} | 36 | 45 | 29 | 35 | 293 | 248 |
| 41 | Emil Kuchta (H); Andreas Hamacher; Susanne Kuchta | Germany | 32 | 43^{†} | 37 | 38 | 42 | 37 | 38 | 32 | 299 | 256 |
| 42 | Enrico Galbiati (H); Antonio Gorgoglione; Roberto Walter | Italy | 43^{†} | 37 | 42 | 35 | 39 | 41 | 35 | 31 | 283 | 260 |
| 43 | Harald Voit (H); Heinz Rösler; Christian Voit | Germany | 36 | 36 | 41 | 41 | 38 | 43 | 51^{†} DNC | 51; DNC | 337 | 286 |
| 44 | Hamish Loudon (H); Marc Keast; Richard Dornstädter | Germany | 49 | 44 | 38 | 37 | 47 | 44 | 39 | 51^{†} DNC | 340 | 298 |
| 45 | Michael Meister (H); Georg Meister; Michael Küthe | Germany | 30 | 42 | 45 | 43 | 45 | 51^{†} DNF | 51; DNC | 51; DNC | 358 | 307 |
| 46 | Marcel Barie (H); Isabel Zocher; Dominik Gärtner | Germany | 47 | 46 | 44 | 39 | 34 | 46 | 51^{†} DNC | 51; DNC | 358 | 307 |
| 47 | Frank Ormstad (H); Frank Ormstad; Björn Gulbrandsen | Norway | 40 | 41 | 40 | 40 | 44 | 51^{†} DNC | 51; DNC | 51; DNC | 358 | 307 |
| 48 | Heiko Petersen (H); Björn Petersen; Rainer Blaß | Germany | 44 | 45 | 51^{†} DNC | 44 | 46 | 42 | 51; DNC | 51; DNC | 374 | 323 |
| 49 | Lutz Rommel (H); Marc Rommel; Dina Rommel | Germany | 48 | 51^{†} DNC | 51; DNC | 51; DNC | 51; DNC | 51; DNC | 51; DNC | 51; DNC | 405 | 354 |
| 50 | Fabio Armellini (H); Attilia Papini; Luca Barbazeni | Italy | 51^{†} DNC | 51; DNC | 51; DNC | 51; DNC | 51; DNC | 51; DNC | 51; DNC | 51; DNC | 408 | 357 |

Legend: DNC – Did not come to the starting area; DNF – Did not finish; DSQ – Disqualified; OCS – On the course side of the starting line; SCP – Scoring penalty taken;
