= Antončič =

Antončič is a Slovenian patronymic surname. Notable people with the surname include:

- Boštjan Antončič, Slovenian academic and researcher
- Emica Antončič (born 1958), Slovenian literary historian, critic and editor
