= Jan Lybeck =

Swedish sailor

Jan Lybeck is a Swedish former sailor in the Star and Soling classes. He won the 1967 Star European Championships and 1970 Soling World Championships crewing for Stig Wennerström.
