= Flower girl (disambiguation) =

Flower girl may refer to:

- Flower seller, traditionally a woman who sells flowers, especially on the street
- Sing-song girls, also known as flower girls, a term for the high-class prostitutes in China during the 19th century
- Flower Girl (2013 film), a Nigerian romantic comedy film
- Flower Girl (2025 film), a Filipino fantasy comedy film
- The Flower Girl, a North Korean revolutionary genre theatrical performance

== See also ==
- The Flower Girl (disambiguation)
