= Poul Mik-Meyer =

Danish sailor

Poul Mik-Meyer (born 16 February 1943 in Copenhagen, Denmark, dead 15 October 2021) is a Danish former Olympic sailor in the Star class. He finished 4th in the 1968 Summer Olympics together with Paul Elvstrøm. He also won the 1967 Star World Championship together with Paul Elvstrøm and 1969 Soling World Championship with Paul Elvstrøm.
