= Mallory Trophy =

American high school sailing trophy

The Mallory Trophy is high school sailing's oldest trophy. It was selected and presented to the then-IYRA (now ISSA) by Clifford Mallory and his son, when the elder Mallory was Commodore of Indian Harbor Yacht Club in Greenwich, Connecticut, and President of NAYRU, the predecessor of US SAILING. The early competitions were in Atlantic-class sloops, hence the sterling silver model of the original Atlantic on the trophy. In recent years the competition for the ISSA Nationals has been in double-handed dinghies in a two-division format. For many years, the U.S. Naval Academy hosted the event. The U.S. Coast Guard Academy hosted the event before that. The boats in the races were keel sloops and Ravens. The Mallory competition now is rotated among the ISSA districts. In 2015 it was hosted by the MASSA at Annapolis, Maryland.
