= The Flower Girl (Murillo) =

Painting by Bartolomé Esteban Murillo

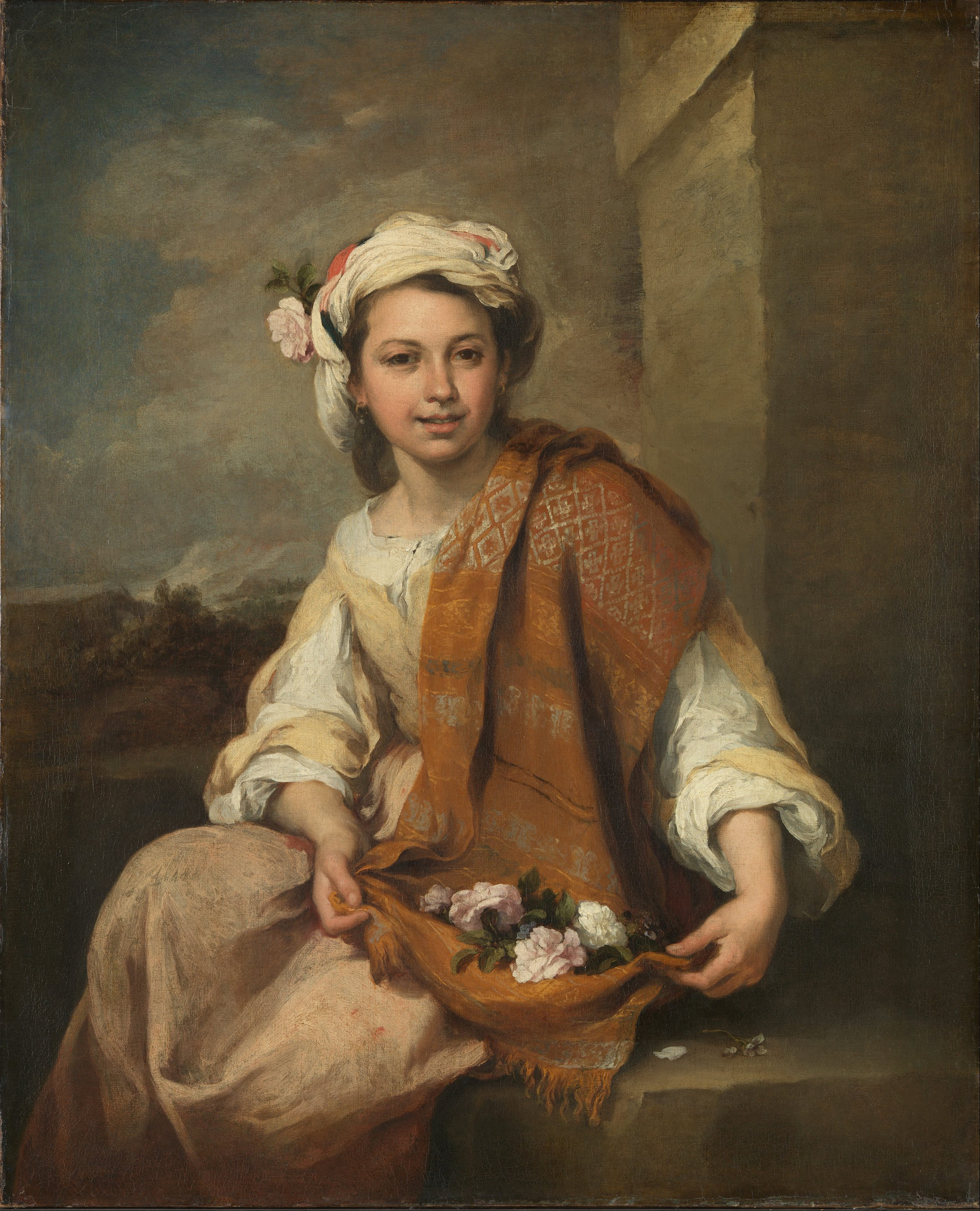
The Flower Girl (c. 1665-1670) by Bartolomé Esteban Murillo

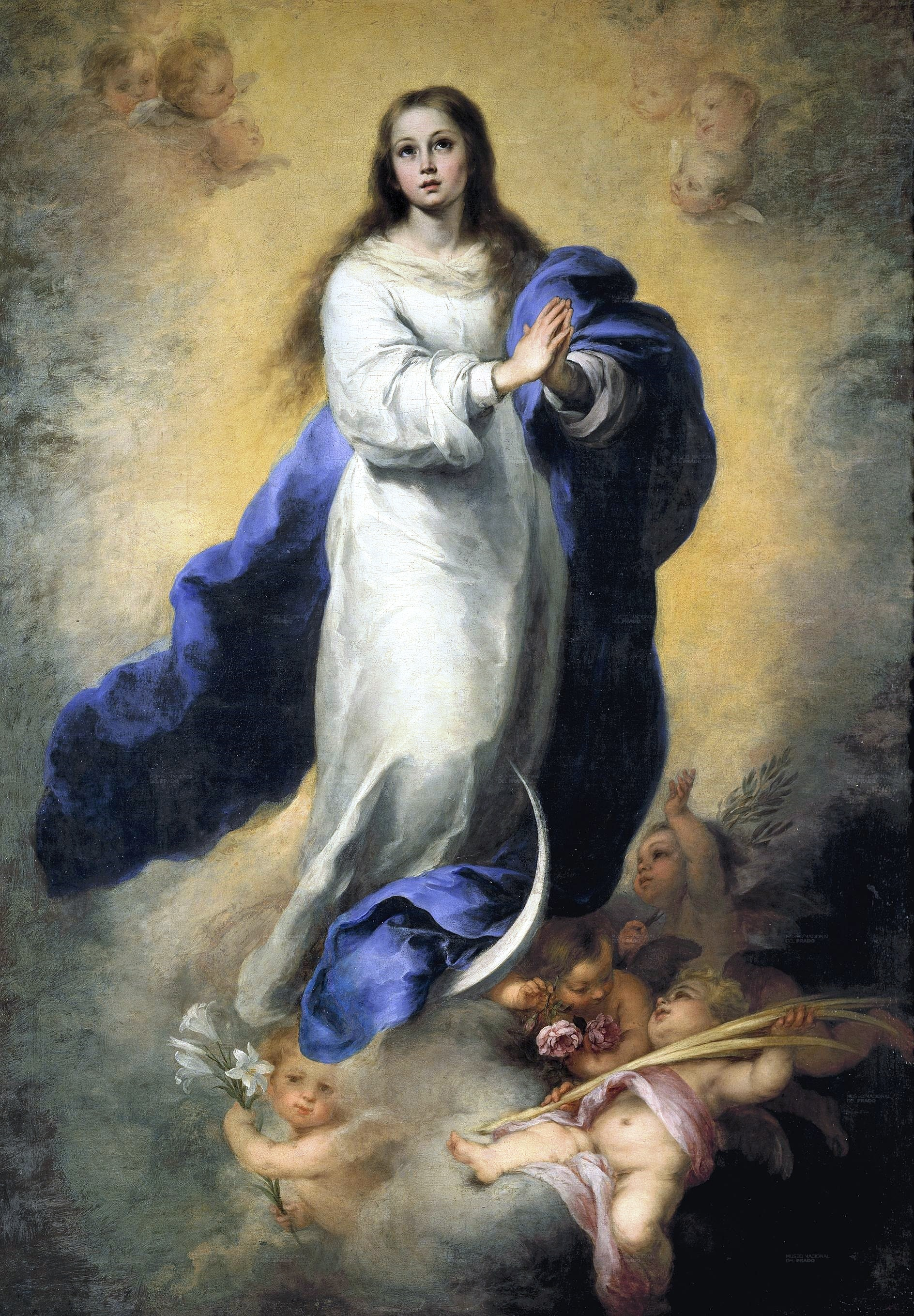
The Immaculate Conception of El Escorial, a section of which can be seen under the top layer of The Flower Girl

The Flower Girl (Italian - Fanciulla con fiori, Ragazza con fiori or La Fioraia'; Spanish - Muchacha con flores) is a c. 1665-1670 oil on canvas painting by the Spanish artist Bartolomé Esteban Murillo, now in the Dulwich Picture Gallery, in London.

An X-ray of The Flower Seller found another image under the first layer, the lower half of a figure matching the Virgin Mary in The Immaculate Conception of El Escorial at a 90 degree angle. Researchers believe Murillo reused canvases - surviving drawings show he produced several versions of this Immaculate Conception from 1664 onwards.

The diffused lighting, clearly visible on the cut sleeves of the girl's dress, is typical of the peak of Murillo's career around 1665-1670. The artist's only child Francisca Maria (1655-1710), born deaf, was received as a Dominican nun as Sister Francis Maria de Santa Rosa in 1671, leading to theories that the painting is a portrait of her as a flower-girl, in which case the rose shown would symbolise her new name and the work would combine religious and familial events in the artist's life.

The British artist Francis Bourgeois (1753-1811) acquired the painting in the 18th century for Stanislaus II Augustus (1732-1798), who wished to set up an art museum in Warsaw on the model of the Hermitage Museum. However, this did not come to pass, since Stansilaus abdicated the throne in 1795, and instead Bourgeois left it to its present home in 1811.

== Bibliography ==
- Nina A. Mallory, El Greco to Murillo: Spanish Painting in the Golden Age, 1556—1700, Harper & Row, 1990. 9780064355315.
- Albert Frederick Calvert, Murillo C. Scribner’s sons, 1908. OCLC 66738190.
