= Charles C. Ingham =

Irish and American artist (c.1796 – 1863)

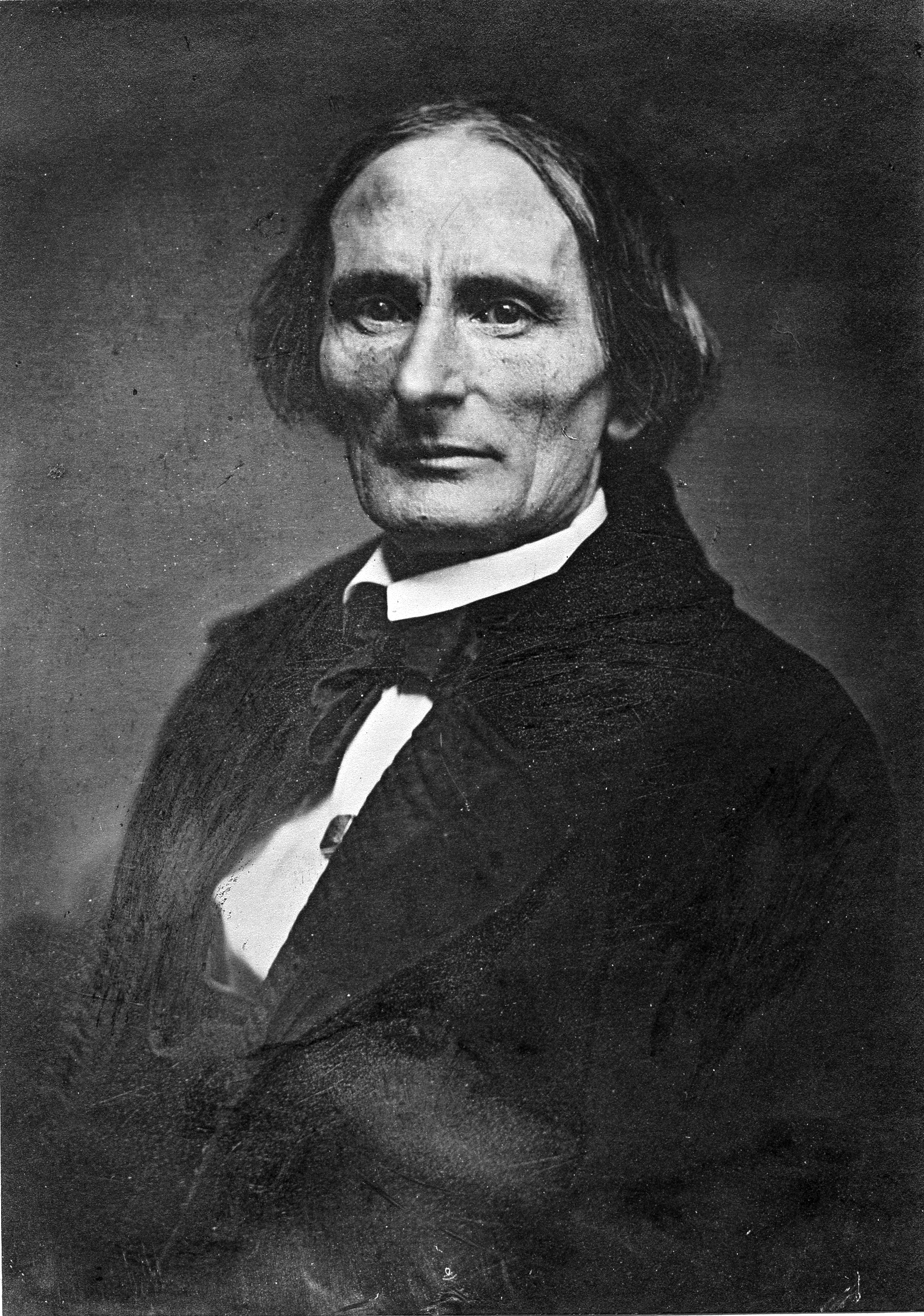
- Born: 1796/1797; Dublin, Ireland
- Died: 10 December 1863 (aged 66–67); New York City, United States

Charles Cromwell Ingham (1796 or 1797 – 10 December 1863) was an Irish-American portrait painter and later a founder of the New York National Academy of Design.

== Life ==
Ingham was a descendant of a man who went to Ireland as an officer in Cromwell's army (hence his middle name). He was born in Dublin in 1796 or 1797, studying art from 1809 to 1813 at The Dublin Institution with William Cuming. It was the influence of Cuming that led to Ingham specialising in female portraiture, and he was also influenced by Martin Archer Shee. In 1810 and 1811, Ingham won prizes with the Dublin Society, and a premium from the Irish Institution in 1815 for this painting, "The death of Cleopatra", which is now lost. Ingham immigrated to the United States in 1816.

He died in New York on 10 December 1863.

== Career ==
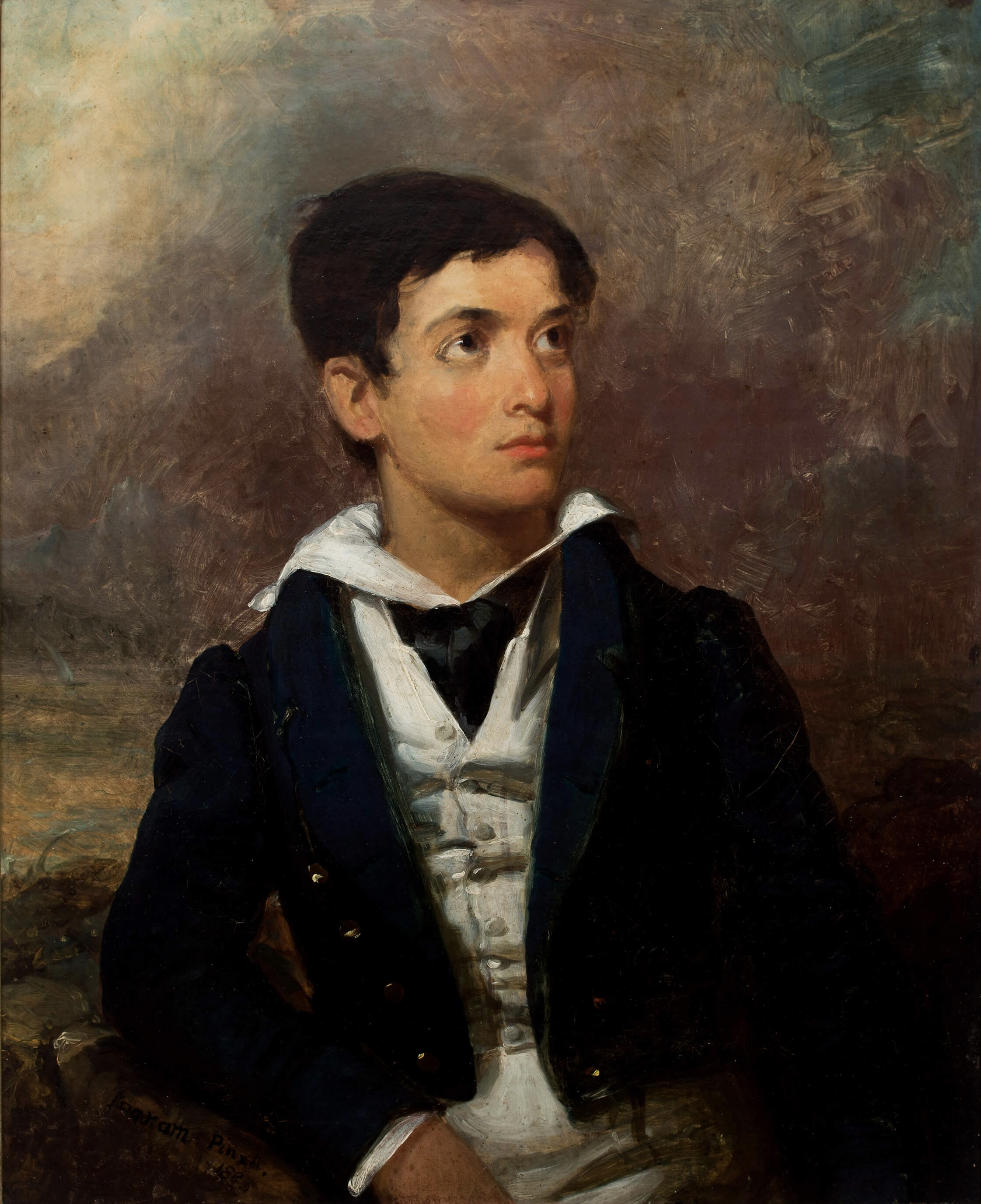
Portrait George Sirian, c. 1828

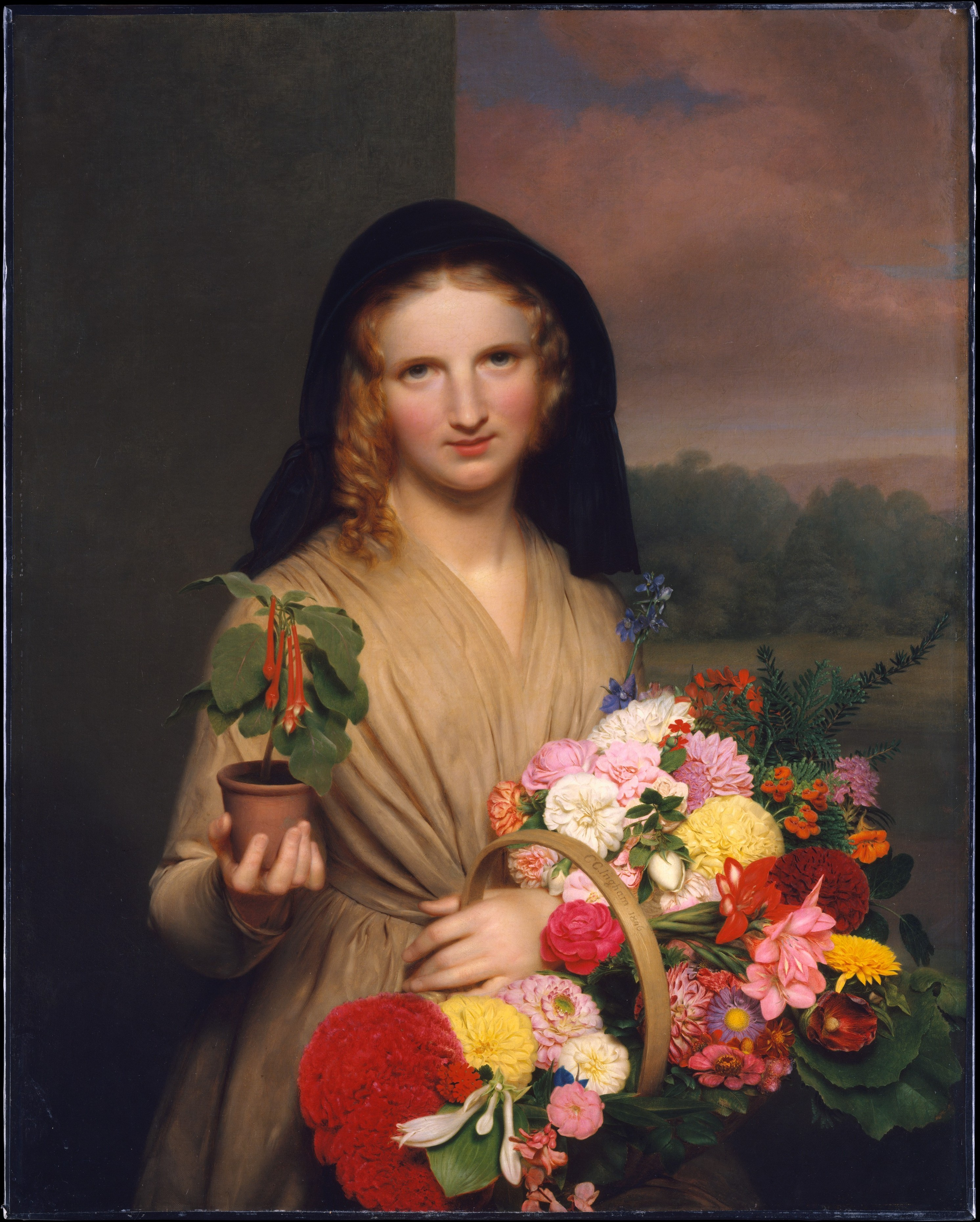
The Flower Girl, c. 1846

When he arrived in New York, Ingham exhibited his "The death of Cleopatra" at the opening of the American Academy of Fine Arts in 1816. Remaining in New York, he distinguished himself by his oil painting, but also in watercolor on ivory, a standard medium for miniature portraits since the 18th century. His work in oil is marked by a high finish achieved by successive glazings, showing the influence of Jean Auguste Dominique Ingres. He initially joined the American Academy of the Fine Arts.

Ingham continued to exhibit in Ireland, with the Royal Hibernian Academy in 1829 and 1842. He was a founding member of the National Academy of Design in 1825, and he served as its vice president for a number of years until his death. When the academy acquired the Browere stables on Broadway in 1848, Ingham served as the chairman of the building committee. He designed the grand staircase, known as "Ingham's stairs". He also founded the Sketch Club, serving as its first president, and of the Century Association.

Ingham occupied a front rank with his brother as a portrait painter known for his paintings of young women of New York's upper class, painting over 200 portraits between 1826 and 1845, such as those including portraits as Flower Girl (1846), Day Dream, and Portrait of a Child. He also occasionally painted landscapes and history paintings. Ingham accompanied the New York State geologist while on a survey trip, leading Ingham to make some of the first sketches of the Adirondack area. He exhibited in Albany, Brooklyn, Philadelphia, and Washington. He lived in Boston for the winter of 1842 to 1843.

== Bibliography ==
- Webb, Alfred. A Compendium of Irish Biography: Comprising Sketches of Distinguished Irishmen and of Eminent Persons Connected with Ireland by Office or by Their Writings, New York: Lemma Publishing Corporation, 1970.
