= Sandy MacMillan =

Canadian sailor

Personal information
- Nationality: Canadian
- Born: 1 July 1952 (age 74) Lunenburg, Nova Scotia
- Height: 1.83 m (6.0 ft)

Sailing career
- Sport: Sailing
- Class: Soling
Competition record
Representing Canada
World Championships
Gold medal – first place	1977 Hanko	Soling
Silver medal – second place	1978 Rio	Soling
Gold medal – first place	1980 Ponce	Soling

Sandy MacMillan (born 1 July 1952) is a Canadian former sailor who competed in the 1976 Summer Olympics. He was a member of the youngest Olympic sailing crew at the 1976 Olympics, with fellow sailors Andreas Josenhans and Glen Dexter. The team placed 8th. The team went on to become the World Class Soling Champions in 1977 and 1980.
