= Andreas Josenhans =

Canadian sailor

Personal information
- Nationality: Canadian
- Born: 12 September 1950 (age 76) Pforzheim, Germany
- Height: 1.83 m (6.0 ft)

Sailing career
- Sport: Sailing
- Class: Soling
Competition record
Representing Canada
World Championships
Gold medal – first place	1977 Hanko	Soling
Silver medal – second place	1978 Rio	Soling
Gold medal – first place	1980 Ponce	Soling

Andreas Josenhans (born 12 September 1950) is a German-born Canadian sailor who competed in the 1976 Summer Olympics.

== Career ==
He was the youngest of the Olympic sailing crews at the Montreal 1976 Olympics, with fellow sailors Glen Dexter and Sandy MacMillan. The team placed 8th. The team went on to become the World Class Soling Champions in 1977 and 1980. Andreas Josenhans was a crew member on America 3, winning the America's Cup in 1992. He was also a member of the Young America crew in 1995.

Andreas Josenhans has worked in management at North Sails for over 25 years. He is considered the Swan 45 Class Leader within North Sails. He has sailed in most major sailing events across the globe with a variety of teams. Andreas Josenhans has also published a variety of articles on sailing and sail design.

Andreas Josenhans currently resides in Nova Scotia, Canada. He was inducted into Canada's Sports Hall of Fame in 1981.
