= Stefan Krook =

Swedish sailor (born 1950)

Medal record

Sailing

Representing Sweden

Olympic Games
Silver medal – second place	1972 Munich	Soling

World Championships
Gold medal – first place	1970 Poole	Soling
Bronze medal – third place	1973 Quiberon	Soling
Bronze medal – third place	1979 Visby	Soling

European Championship
Gold medal – first place	1975 Alassio	Soling

Stefan Krook (born 1 October 1950) is a Swedish sailor. He won a silver medal at the 1972 Summer Olympics and a gold medal at the World Championship 1970, as well as at the European Championship 1975 in the Soling class. He has also won 2 bronze medals at the World Championships 1973 and 1979, and several Nordic and Swedish Championship gold medals in the Soling class.
