= The Flower Girl (Ingham) =

Painting by Charles Cromwell Ingham

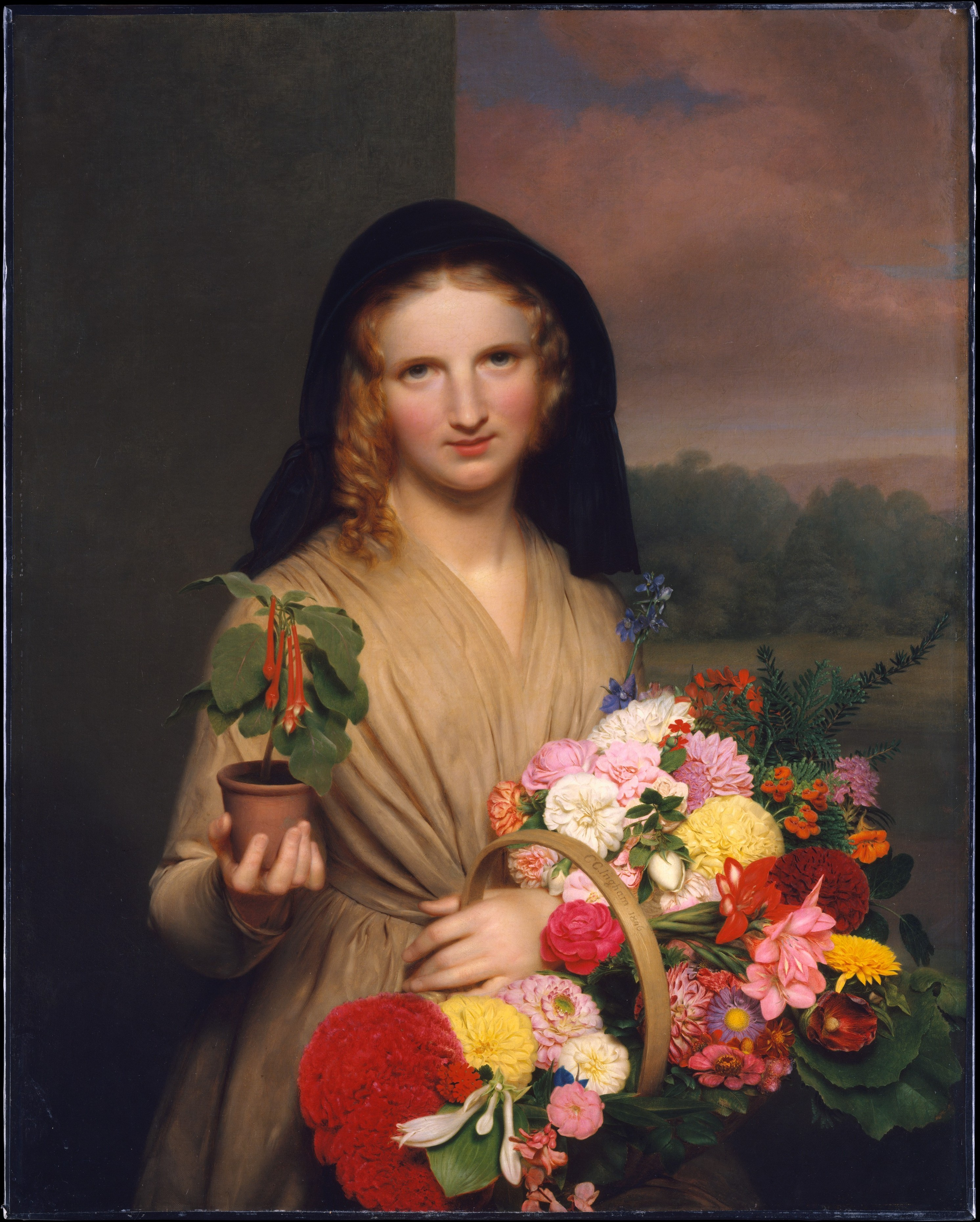
- Artist: Charles Cromwell Ingham
- Year: 1846
- Medium: Oil on canvas
- Subject: Marie Perkins (speculative)
- Dimensions: 91.4 cm × 72.1 cm (36.0 in × 28.4 in)
- Location: Metropolitan Museum of Art; New York City
- Accession: 02.7.1

The Flower Girl is a mid 19th-century painting by Irish-American artist Charles Cromwell Ingham. Done in oil on canvas, the painting depicts a young woman holding a bouquet of flowers. The painting is currently in the collection of the Metropolitan Museum of Art.

== Description ==
Inghram painted Flower Girl in 1846. Though the original commissioner of the painting is not known, sources speculate it was painted for Jonathan Sturges, who owned the painting when it was first displayed in 1847. The model who sat for Inghram is not known, though one source speculates it was a Marie Perkins of New Orleans.

Like many contemporaneous paintings, Flower Girl depicts a street vendor. Inghram had previously rendered paintings of street vendors, but Flower is unusual among his works in that it portrays a young girl in place of a young boy. According to the Met's description of the painting, Inghram may have been inspired to paint a flower girl by a similar (and notably popular) painting of the same name by 17th century painter Bartolomé Esteban Murillo.

As far as painting elements are concerned, Inghram's Flower Girl makes effective use of colors and direction; the titular flower girl's bouquet is made up of a number of different flowers, while her gaze is fixed directly on the viewer. The girl holds in her right hand a potted fuchsia, a traditional symbol of the Roman goddess Flora and of frustrated love. Inghram's signature can be seen on the flower basket's handle.

The Metropolitan Museum of Art acquired the painting in 1902 as a gift from William Church Osborn, a New York lawyer who would eventually become president of the Met from 1941 to 1947.
