= Glen Dexter =

Canadian sailor

Personal information
- Full name: Glen Vincent Dexter
- Born: 1 November 1952 (age 74) Lunenburg, Nova Scotia, Canada
- Height: 1.83 m (6.0 ft)

Sailing career
- Sport: Sailing
- Class: Soling
Competition record
Representing Canada
Soling World Championship
Gold medal – first place	1977 Hanko	Soling
Silver medal – second place	1978 Rio	Soling
Gold medal – first place	1980 Ponce	Soling

Glen Vincent Dexter (born 1 November 1952) is a Canadian former sailor who competed in the 1976 Summer Olympics. He was a member of the youngest Olympic sailing crew at the 1976 Olympics, with fellow sailors Andreas Josenhans and Sandy MacMillan. The team placed 8th. The team went on to become the World Class Soling Champions in 1977 and 1980.

== Early life and education ==
Dexter graduated from Dalhousie University with a Bachelor of Science with honours in Physics and then graduated with Bachelor of Laws in 1982. He also obtained a Master of Mathematics from University of Waterloo.

== Business career ==
Dexter, along with former Olympic partners Andreas Josenhans and Sandy MacMillan, founded North Sails Atlantic, the largest sail manufacturing firm in Nova Scotia. Dexter practised corporate law for 15 years with the law firm, Stewart McKelvey Stirling Scales. Dexter is president and CEO of Canadian International Capital and chairman of Medusa Medical Technologies, a health care related software company.
