= John Kolius =

American sailor (born 1951)

Personal information
- Born: April 1, 1951 (age 75) Houston, Texas, U.S.
Medal record
Sailing
Representing United States
Olympic Games
Silver medal – second place	1976 Montreal	Soling class

John Waldrip Kolius (born April 1, 1951) is an American sailor. He won a silver medal in the Soling class with Walter Glasgow and Richard Hoepfner at the 1976 Summer Olympics in Montreal. In 1987 and 2000 he competed at the Louis Vuitton Cup. Kolius began sailing at the age of 5 when his father introduced the family to sailing as a way to spend time together. John's first boat was a Sunfish and he grew up sailing at the Houston Yacht Club through the Ragnot program. In 1968, John won his first major championship, the US Sailing Triplehanded Championship for the Sears Cup. He was 17 years old. Two years later at the age of 19, Kolius won the US Sailing Senior Championship for the Mallory Trophy. It was not too long after that he began sailing Solings and preparing for the Olympics. In 1975, John won the Soling North Americans and in 1976 an Olympic silver medal. In 2023, he was inducted into the National Sailing Hall of Fame

Kolius was born in Houston, Texas.

== America's Cup ==
Kolius became an America's Cup competitor in 1983, skippering Courageous against Tom Blackaller in Defender and eventual cup defender Dennis Conner in Liberty. Kolius was recruited for his second Cup effort in 1987, this time as skipper of America II. When the America's Cup shifted to IACC yachts for the 1992 Cup, Kolius sailed as part of the Italian team, Il Moro di Venezia, with Raul Gardini and Paul Cayard, in which he placed 3rd at the IACC Worlds in 1991. He coached the team to a second place in the 1992 America's Cup. America3 recruited Kolius as a coach for their Cup run in 1995. Then when the Cup traveled to New Zealand for the 2000 event, Kolius put together the Aloha Racing Team.

Throughout his sailing career, John has won numerous championship events. He is a two-time winner of the J24 Worlds (1979 & 1981), the 50 ft World Championships in 1992, the Kenwood Cup in 1994, and the 1997 Admiral's Cup just to name a few. John was also part of the team that organized the Ultimate 30 Pro Racing Series in the late '80s and went on to win the Ultimate 30 Championship in 1989.

Significant Sailing Accomplishments

- 1968 Sears Cup Winner
- 1971 Mallory Cup Winner
- 1975 Soling North American Winner
- 1976 Olympic Silver Medal
- 1979 & 1981 J24 World Champion
- 1981 Championship of Champions Winner
- 1990 & 1992 50 ft World Cup Champion
- 1995 Transpac first to finish
- 1997 Admiral's Cup 1st Place Team
- 1998 One-design 48 World Champion
- 2005 J80 North American Champion
- 2008 ACC Melges 24 Winner

== Business accomplishments ==
Kolius learned his sailmaking skills working for Buddy Melges. In 1978, Kolius opened the Texas franchise of Ulmer Sails which then became Ulmer-Kolius. Several years later Kolius sold his franchise, finding himself too busy with America's Cup events to be able to participate in the business. Ulmer-Kolius then became UK. In the 1990s, Kolius opened Regatta Sports and Rigging, which later became KO Sailing.
