= Walter Glasgow =

American sailor

Personal information
- Full name: Walter Merrill Glasgow, Jr.
- Born: April 19, 1957 (age 69) Houston, Texas, U.S.
Medal record
Sailing
Representing United States
Olympic Games
Silver medal – second place	1976 Montreal	Soling class

Walter M. Glasgow Jr. (born April 19, 1957) is an American sailor. He was born in Houston, Texas. He won the 1975 Soling North American championship and finished 3rd in the 1975 Soling World Championship with John Kolius and Richard Hoepfner. He won a silver medal in the Soling Class with John Kolius and Richard Hoepfner at the 1976 Summer Olympics in Kingston, Ontario, Canada. He finished 3rd in the 1979 5.5 m World Championship in Hanko, Norway with Albert Fay. He won the 1981 J-24 World Championship at St. Francis Yacht Club in San Francisco, California with John Kolius. He finished 2nd in the 1985 5.5 m U.S. Championship and 3rd in the 1985 5.5 m World Championship in Newport Beach, California with Robert Mosbacher. In 1997, he won the 5.5 m Scandinavian Gold Cup and finished 5th in the 5.5 m World Championship in Hanko, Norway with Robert Mosbacher and Lawrence Daniel.
