= Bostjan Antoncic =

Slovenian researcher

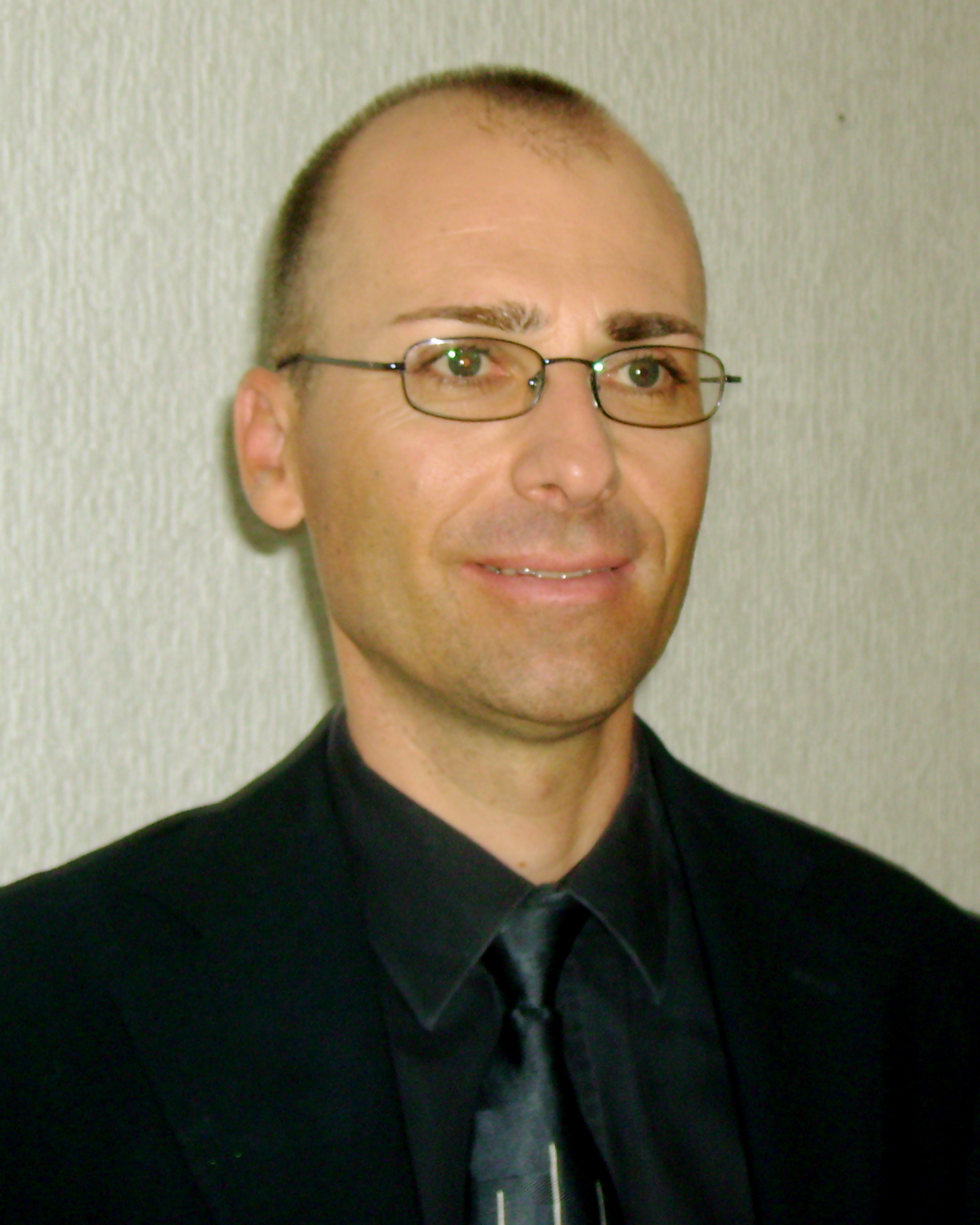
- Citizenship: Slovenian
- Occupations: Economist, researcher, sailor
- Website: bostjanantoncic.si

Bostjan Antoncic
Sailing career
- Sport: Sailing
Medal record
World Championships
Silver medal – second place	2005 Castiglione della Pescaia	Soling
Gold medal – first place	2008 La Marina di Scarlino	Soling
European Championship
Silver medal – second place	2004 Tonsberg	Soling
Gold medal – first place	2007 Arendal	Soling

Bostjan Antoncic is a Slovenian academic and researcher, serves as a professor of entrepreneurship at the School of Economics and Business, University of Ljubljana.

Boštjan Antončič’s work focuses primarily on how entrepreneurship operates within existing organizations (intrapreneurship), how it interconnects with personality, networks, innovation, and the international marketplace. He has authored or co-authored seventeen books, fourteen of which focus on the field of entrepreneurship, as well as numerous scientific articles. He has 16,862 citations to his work and an h-index of 35.

Alongside his academic career, he has also been active in sailing, representing his country in the 2008 Vintage Yachting Games – Soling, winning a gold medal at the 2008 Soling World Championship, and a silver medal at the 2005 Soling World Championship.

== Books ==
- Antončič, Boštjan; Hisrich, Robert D.; Petrin, Tea; Vahčič, Aleš (2002). Podjetništvo. ISBN 86-7061-279-8.
- Antončič, Boštjan; Ruzzier, Mitja, Bratkovic , Tina. Podjetniške mreže in rast. ISBN 978-961-91054-9-8
