= Niels Jensen =

Danish sailor

Personal information
- Full name: Niels Jensen
- Nationality: Danish
- Born: 7 June 1939 (age 87) Copenhagen, Denmark
- Height: 1.74 m (5.7 ft)

Sailing career
- Sport: Sailing
- Club: Hellerup Sejlklub
- Class: Flying Dutchman
- Updated on 17 March 2014

Niels Jensen (born 7 June 1939 in Copenhagen) is a sailor from Denmark. Jensen represented his country at the 1968 Summer Olympics in Acapulco. Jensen took 16th place in the Danish Flying Dutchman with Hans Fogh as helmsman.
