= Richard Hoepfner =

American sailor (born 1944)

Personal information
- Born: November 14, 1944 (age 81) Houston, Texas, U.S.
Medal record
Sailing
Representing United States
Olympic Games
Silver medal – second place	1976 Montreal	Soling class

Richard Hoepfner (born November 14, 1944) is an American sailor. He won a silver medal in the Soling Class with John Kolius and Walter Glasgow at the 1976 Summer Olympics. Hoepfner was born in Houston, Texas.
