= Stig Wennerström (sailor) =

Swedish sailor

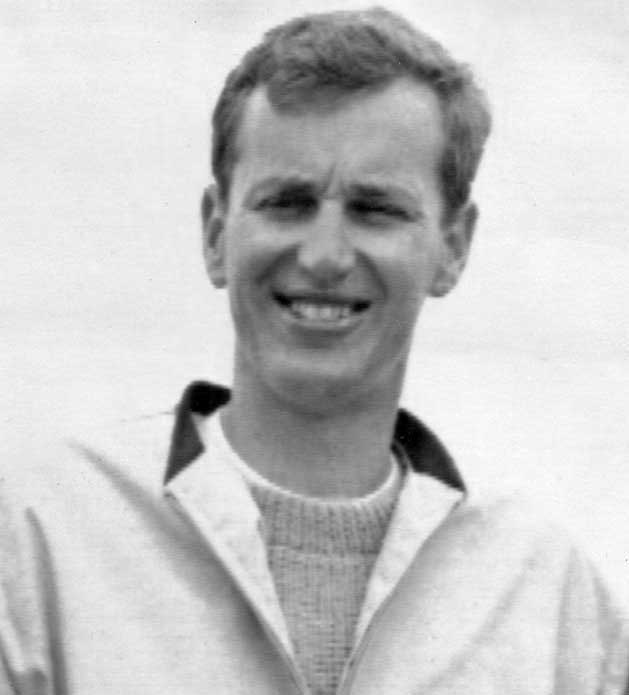

Personal information
- Full name: Stig Henrik Wennerström
- Born: 31 March 1943 (age 83) Gothenburg, Sweden
- Height: 187 cm (6 ft 2 in)

Sport
- Sport: Sailing
- Club: Royal Gothenburg Yacht Club
Medal record
Representing Sweden
Olympic Games
Silver medal – second place	1972 Munich	Soling
World Championships
Gold medal – first place	1970 Poole	Soling
Bronze medal – third place	1970 Marstrand	Star class
Bronze medal – third place	1973 Quiberon	Soling

Stig Henrik Wennerström (born 31 March 1943) is a Swedish sailor. Competing in the Soling class he won a silver medal at the 1972 Summer Olympics and a gold medal at the 1970 World Championships, placing third in 1973.
