= Soling World Championship results (1980–1984) =

Soling
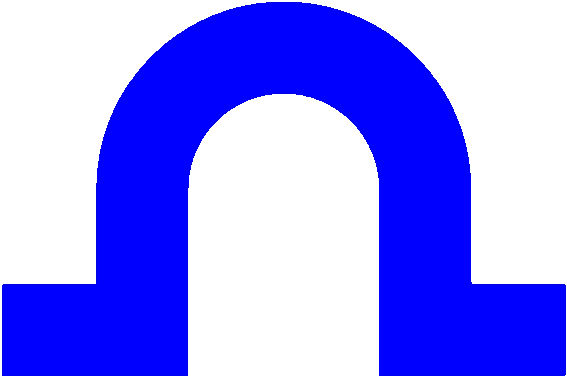

Development
- Name: Soling

This article stated the results of the World Soling Championships from 1980 till 1984. Unfortunately not all crew names are documented in the major sources: United States Soling Association (USSA) bulletin "Leading Edge" and International Soling Association (ISA) magazine "Soling Sailing".

== 1980 Final results ==
1980
Event title
- Edition: 12
- Host: Club Náutico de Ponce

Event details
- Venue: Ponce, Puerto Rico
- Dates: 15-26 January
- Yachts: 38
- Opening ceremony: 19 January

Competitors
- Competitors: 114
- Competing nations: 14

Results
- (gold) Gold: Canada; Glen Dexter; Andreas Josenhans; Sandy MacMillan
- (silver) Silver: United States; Robbie Haines; Rod Davis; Ed Trevelyan
- (bronze) Bronze: United States; Buddy Melges; Crew not documented

| Rank | Country | Helmsman | Crew | Sail No. | Race 1 | | Race 2 | | Race 3 | | Race 4 | | Race 5 | | Race 6 | | Race 7 | | Total | Total – discard |
| Rank | Country | Helmsman | Crew | Sail No. | Pos. | Pts. | Pos. | Pts. | Pos. | Pts. | Pos. | Pts. | Pos. | Pts. | Pos. | Pts. | Pos. | Pts. | Total | Total – discard |
| 1st place, gold medalist(s) | CAN | Glen Dexter | Andreas Josenhans; Sandy MacMillan | KC 149 | 1 | 0.0 | ~~27~~ | ~~33.0~~ | 10 | 16.0 | 13 | 19.0 | 1 | 0.0 | 3 | 5.7 | 5 | 10.0 | 83.7 | 50.7 |
| 2nd place, silver medalist(s) | USA | Robbie Haines | Rod Davis; Ed Trevelyan | US 707 | 5 | 10.0 | 11 | 17.0 | 4 | 8.0 | 1 | 0.0 | 16 | 22.0 | ~~25~~ | ~~31.0~~ | 1 | 0.0 | 88.0 | 57.0 |
| 3rd place, bronze medalist(s) | USA | Buddy Melges | Not documented | US 700 | 3 | 5.7 | ~~28~~ | ~~34.0~~ | 1 | 0.0 | 16 | 22.0 | 17 | 23.0 | 2 | 3.0 | 4 | 8.0 | 95.7 | 61.7 |
| 4 | GER | Willi Kuhweide | Axel May; Karsten Meyer | G 205 | 6 | 11.7 | ~~21~~ | ~~27.0~~ | 13 | 19.0 | 2 | 3.0 | 12 | 18.0 | 5 | 10.0 | 2 | 3.0 | 91.7 | 64.7 |
| 5 | BRA | Vicente Brun | Not documented | BL 593 | 18 | 24.0 | 5 | 10.0 | 3 | 5.7 | 4 | 8.0 | 2 | 3.0 | ~~DSQ~~ | ~~45.0~~ | 8 | 14.0 | 109.7 | 64.7 |
| 6 | USA | Ed Baird | Not documented | US 693 | ~~17~~ | ~~23.0~~ | 13 | 19.0 | 2 | 3.0 | 9 | 15.0 | 7 | 13.0 | 11 | 17.0 | 3 | 5.7 | 95.7 | 72.7 |
| 7 | CAN | Bill Abbott Jr. | Bill Abbott Sr. Phil Bissell | KC 1 | 7 | 13.0 | ~~24~~ | ~~30.0~~ | 9 | 15.0 | 8 | 14.0 | 5 | 10.0 | 1 | 0.0 | 15 | 21.0 | 103.0 | 73.0 |
| 8 | USA | Dave Curtis | Not documented | US 658 | 10 | 16.0 | 4 | 8.0 | 5 | 10.0 | 10 | 16.0 | ~~14~~ | ~~20.0~~ | 9 | 15.0 | 9 | 15.0 | 100.0 | 80.0 |
| 9 | USA | Bill Allen | Not documented | US 712 | 13 | 19.0 | 1 | 0.0 | ~~19~~ | ~~25.0~~ | 5 | 10.0 | 6 | 11.7 | 17 | 23.0 | 14 | 20.0 | 108.7 | 83.7 |
| 10 | USA | Peter Isler | Not documented | US 710 | ~~26~~ | ~~32.0~~ | 2 | 3.0 | 8 | 14.0 | 14 | 20.0 | 9 | 15.0 | 13 | 19.0 | 7 | 13.0 | 116.0 | 84.0 |
| 11 | DEN | Poul Richard Høj Jensen | Not documented | D 75 | ~~28~~ | ~~34.0~~ | 12 | 18.0 | 7 | 13.0 | 6 | 11.7 | 22 | 28.0 | 10 | 16.0 | 10 | 16.0 | 136.7 | 102.7 |
| 12 | CAN | Peter Hall | Not documented | KC 163 | 11 | 17.0 | 7 | 13.0 | 15 | 21.0 | 12 | 18.0 | ~~25~~ | ~~31.0~~ | 12 | 18.0 | 12 | 18.0 | 136.0 | 105.0 |
| 13 | USA | Jim Coggan | Not documented | US 695 | 2 | 3.0 | 26 | 32.0 | ~~30~~ | ~~36.0~~ | 7 | 13.0 | 28 | 34.0 | 7 | 13.0 | 6 | 11.7 | 142.7 | 106.7 |
| 14 | CAN | Hans Fogh | Not documented | KC 161 | 9 | 15.0 | ~~36~~ | ~~42.0~~ | 6 | 11.7 | 3 | 5.7 | 23 | 29.0 | 20 | 26.0 | 16 | 22.0 | 151.4 | 109.4 |
| 15 | GBR | Phill Crebbin | Tony Blachford; Mark Dowland | K 138 | 14 | 20.0 | 14 | 20.0 | 12 | 18.0 | 21 | 27.0 | 4 | 8.0 | ~~DSQ~~ | ~~45.0~~ | 17 | 23.0 | 161.0 | 116.0 |
| 16 | FRA | Patrick Haegeli | Not documented | F 142 | 4 | 8.0 | 15 | 21.0 | 20 | 26.0 | 11 | 17.0 | ~~DSQ~~ | ~~45.0~~ | 14 | 20.0 | 21 | 27.0 | 164.0 | 119.0 |
| 17 | GER | Fritz Geis | Not documented | G 212 | 23 | 29.0 | 18 | 24.0 | 16 | 22.0 | 15 | 21.0 | 3 | 5.7 | 18 | 24.0 | ~~DNF~~ | ~~45.0~~ | 170.7 | 125.7 |
| 18 | GBR | Alan Warren | Not documented | K 135 | 8 | 14.0 | 6 | 11.7 | ~~26~~ | ~~32.0~~ | 22 | 28.0 | 8 | 14.0 | 26 | 32.0 | 23 | 29.0 | 160.7 | 128.7 |
| 19 | DEN | Valdemar Bandolowski | Not documented | D 77 | 16 | 22.0 | ~~25~~ | ~~31.0~~ | 14 | 20.0 | 18 | 24.0 | 20 | 26.0 | 8 | 14.0 | 18 | 24.0 | 161.0 | 130.0 |
| 20 | NOR | Odd Roar Lofterød | Not documented | N 93 | ~~27~~ | ~~33.0~~ | 9 | 15.0 | 23 | 29.0 | 19 | 25.0 | 15 | 21.0 | 16 | 22.0 | 13 | 19.0 | 164.0 | 131.0 |
| 21 | PUR | Eric Tulla | Not documented | PR 21 | ~~32~~ | ~~38.0~~ | 10 | 16.0 | YMP | 26.0 | 26 | 32.0 | 13 | 19.0 | 23 | 29.0 | 19 | 25.0 | 185.0 | 147.0 |
| 22 | USA | Robert Mosbacher | Not documented | US 721 | 25 | 31.0 | 3 | 5.7 | 32 | 38.0 | ~~DNF~~ | ~~45.0~~ | 10 | 16.0 | 21 | 27.0 | 26 | 32.0 | 194.7 | 149.7 |
| 23 | SWE | Stig Wennerstrom | Not documented | S 120 | 15 | 21.0 | 22 | 28.0 | 11 | 17.0 | 17 | 23.0 | 29 | 35.0 | 21 | 27.0 | ~~DNS~~ | ~~45.0~~ | 196.0 | 151.0 |
| 24 | SWE | Erik Thorsell | Not documented | S 102 | 31 | 37.0 | 8 | 14.0 | 25 | 31.0 | ~~DNF~~ | ~~45.0~~ | 11 | 17.0 | 19 | 25.0 | 24 | 30.0 | 199.0 | 154.0 |
| 25 | GER | Erich Hirt | Not documented | G 219 | 21 | 27.0 | 23 | 29.0 | 27 | 33.0 | 28 | 34.0 | 19 | 25.0 | 4 | 8.0 | ~~DNF~~ | ~~45.0~~ | 201.0 | 156.0 |
| 26 | SWE | Jörgen Sundelin | Not documented | S 119 | 12 | 18.0 | 20 | 26.0 | 22 | 28.0 | 25 | 31.0 | 21 | 27.0 | ~~27~~ | ~~33.0~~ | 25 | 31.0 | 194.0 | 161.0 |
| 27 | USA | Don Cohan | Not documented | US 723 | 22 | 28.0 | ~~29~~ | ~~35.0~~ | 21 | 27.0 | 23 | 29.0 | 26 | 32.0 | 15 | 21.0 | 22 | 28.0 | 200.0 | 165.0 |
| 28 | NED | Geert Bakker | Dick Coster; Steven Bakker | H 22 | 20 | 26.0 | ~~31~~ | ~~37.0~~ | 17 | 23.0 | 20 | 26.0 | 31 | 37.0 | 31 | 37.0 | 11 | 17.0 | 203.0 | 166.0 |
| 29 | SWE | Arved von Gruenewald | Not documented | S 115 | 24 | 30.0 | 32 | 38.0 | 28 | 34.0 | 24 | 30.0 | 18 | 24.0 | 6 | 11.7 | ~~DNF~~ | ~~45.0~~ | 212.7 | 167.7 |
| 30 | USA | Glenn Darden | Not documented | US 715 | 19 | 25.0 | 19 | 25.0 | 24 | 30.0 | ~~34~~ | ~~40.0~~ | 30 | 36.0 | 30 | 36.0 | 20 | 26.0 | 218.0 | 178.0 |
| 31 | ARG | C. Fassarfi | Not documented | A 3 | 30 | 36.0 | 16 | 22.0 | 34 | 40.0 | 24 | 30.0 | 27 | 33.0 | 34 | 40.0 | ~~DNF~~ | ~~45.0~~ | 246.0 | 201.0 |
| 32 | PUR | Juan Torruella | Not documented | PR 1 | 33 | 39.0 | 35 | 41.0 | 18 | 24.0 | 27 | 33.0 | ~~DNF~~ | ~~45.0~~ | 28 | 34.0 | 30 | 36.0 | 252.0 | 207.0 |
| 33 | DEN | T. Soerrensen | Not documented | D 78 | 35 | 41.0 | 33 | 39.0 | 31 | 37.0 | 31 | 37.0 | 24 | 30.0 | 24 | 30.0 | ~~DNF~~ | ~~45.0~~ | 259.0 | 214.0 |
| 34 | BER | Alex Cooper | Not documented | KB 34 | 29 | 35.0 | 30 | 36.0 | 29 | 35.0 | 29 | 35.0 | 32 | 38.0 | 29 | 35.0 | ~~DNF~~ | ~~45.0~~ | 259.0 | 214.0 |
| 35 | ARG | Santiago Lange | Not documented | A 12 | ~~DNF~~ | ~~45.0~~ | 17 | 23.0 | DNF | 45.0 | DNF | 45.0 | 36 | 42.0 | 33 | 39.0 | 28 | 34.0 | 273.0 | 228.0 |
| 36 | ARG | Pedro Ferrero | Not documented | A 10 | 36 | 42.0 | 37 | 43.0 | 33 | 39.0 | 32 | 38.0 | 35 | 41.0 | ~~DNF~~ | ~~45.0~~ | 29 | 35.0 | 283.0 | 238.0 |
| 37 | PUR | A. Nevarez | Not documented | PR 14 | 37 | 43.0 | 38 | 44.0 | 35 | 41.0 | 33 | 39.0 | 33 | 39.0 | ~~DNF~~ | ~~45.0~~ | 27 | 33.0 | 284.0 | 239.0 |
| 38 | ARG | J.A. Zuccoli | Not documented | A 7 | 34 | 40.0 | 34 | 40.0 | 36 | 42.0 | ~~DNF~~ | ~~45.0~~ | 34 | 40.0 | 32 | 38.0 | DNF | 45.0 | 290.0 | 245.0 |

Legend: DNF – Did not finish; DNS – Did not start; DSQ – Disqualified; YMP – Yacht materially prejudiced;
Discard is crossed out and does not count for the overall result.

- 1980 Progress

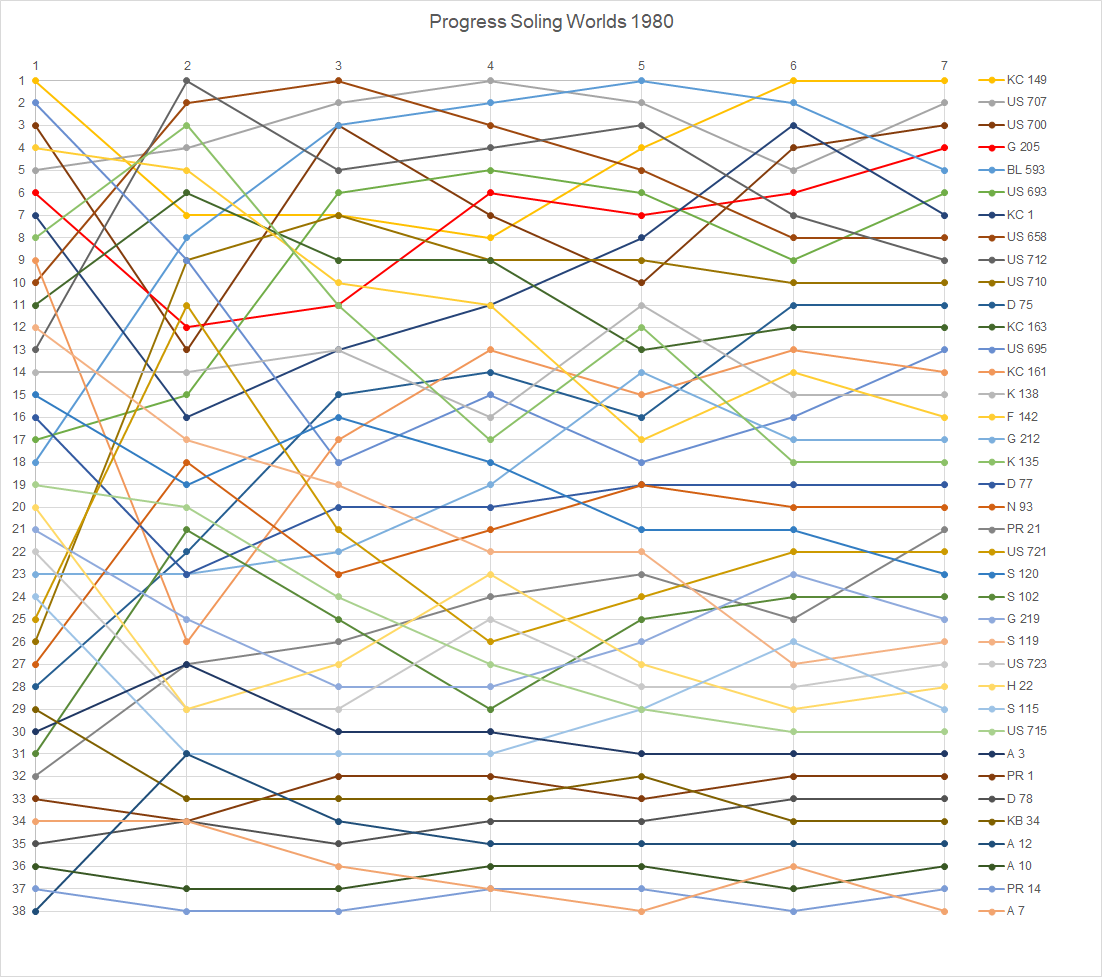

== 1981 Final results ==
Only top 20 teams are documented.

1981
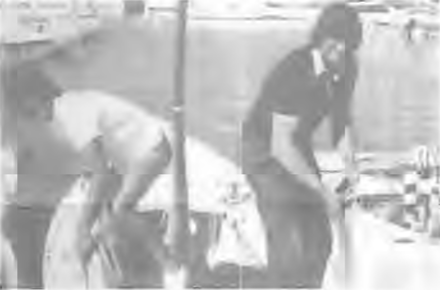

Event title
- Edition: 13

Event details
- Venue: Anzio, Italy
- Dates: 6-16 May
- Yachts: 59
- Opening ceremony: 9 May

Competitors
- Competitors: 177

Results
- (gold) Gold: Brazil; Gastão Brun; Vicente Brun; Steven Bakker Netherlands
- (silver) Silver: Greece; Tassos Boudouris; Antonios Bountouris; Dimitrios Deligiann
- (bronze) Bronze: Italy; Gianluca Lamaro; Valerio Romano; Aurelio Dalla Vecchia

| Rank | Country | Helmsman | Crew | Sail No. | Race 1 | | Race 2 | | Race 3 | | Race 4 | | Race 5 | | Race 6 | | Race 7 | | Total | Total – discard |
| Rank | Country | Helmsman | Crew | Sail No. | Pos. | Pts. | Pos. | Pts. | Pos. | Pts. | Pos. | Pts. | Pos. | Pts. | Pos. | Pts. | Pos. | Pts. | Total | Total – discard |
| 1st place, gold medalist(s) | USA | Vincente Brun | Gastão Brun; Steven Bakker | US 593 | 6 | 11.7 | 4 | 8.0 | 3 | 5.7 | ~~PMS~~ | ~~66.0~~ | 1 | 0.0 | 8 | 14.0 | 5 | 10.0 | 115.4 | 49.4 |
| 2nd place, silver medalist(s) | GRE | Tassos Boudouris | Antonios Bountouris; Dimitrios Deligiann | GR 30 | 2 | 3.0 | ~~32~~ | ~~38.0~~ | 8 | 14.0 | 10 | 16.0 | 9 | 15.0 | 6 | 11.7 | 2 | 3.0 | 100.7 | 62.7 |
| 3rd place, bronze medalist(s) | ITA | Gianluca Lamaro | Aurelio Dalla Vecchia; Valerio Romano | I 154 | ~~33~~ | ~~39.0~~ | 9 | 15.0 | 1 | 0.0 | 1 | 0.0 | 15 | 21.0 | 17 | 23.0 | 17 | 23.0 | 121.0 | 82.0 |
| 4 | FRG | Willy Kuhweide | Eckhard Löll; Ziegelmark | G 205 | ~~15~~ | ~~21.0~~ | 11 | 17.0 | 6 | 11.7.0 | 6 | 11.7.0 | 7 | 13.0 | 11 | 17.0 | 6 | 11.7 | 103.1 | 82.1 |
| 5 | FRG | Fritz Geis | Richard Fricke; Karl Fricke | G 212 | 3 | 5.7 | 7 | 13.0 | 3 | 5.7 | ~~PMS~~ | ~~66.0~~ | 11 | 17.0 | 15 | 21.0 | 18 | 24.0 | 152.4 | 86.4 |
| 6 | URS | Boris Budnikov | Aleksandr Budnikov; Rusichinro | SR 27 | 16 | 22.0 | 6 | 11.7 | 2 | 3.0 | 17 | 23.0 | 4 | 8.0 | ~~20~~ | ~~26.0~~ | 15 | 21.0 | 114.7 | 88.7 |
| 7 | FRG | Erich Hirt | Obermaier; Pachmann | G 213 | ~~20~~ | ~~26.0~~ | 12 | 18.0 | 19 | 25.0 | 12 | 18.0 | 2 | 3.0 | 4 | 8.0 | 12 | 18.0 | 116.0 | 90.0 |
| 8 | ITA | Maurizio Bolens | Ernesto Bolens; Christaloini | I 194 | 30 | 36.0 | 4 | 8.0 | 26 | 32.0 | 11 | 17.0 | 3 | 5.7 | ~~DSQ~~ | ~~66.0~~ | 1 | 0.0 | 164.7 | 98.7 |
| 9 | ITA | Giuseppe Milone | Roberto Mottola di Amato; Klinkenborg | I 201 | 5 | 10.0 | 26 | 32.0 | 9 | 15.0 | ~~DNF~~ | ~~66.0~~ | 19 | 25.0 | 2 | 3.0 | 10 | 16.0 | 167.0 | 101.0 |
| 10 | SWE | Jan Andersson | Bertil Larsson; Wallaten | S 118 | 12 | 18.0 | 8 | 14.0 | ~~41~~ | ~~47.0~~ | 22 | 28.0 | 16 | 22.0 | 1 | 0.0 | 14 | 20.0 | 149.0 | 102.0 |
| 11 | AUT | Carl Auterried Jr. | Mattheis; Mittendorfer | OE 70 | 10 | 16.0 | 18 | 24.0 | 10 | 16.0 | ~~42~~ | ~~48.0~~ | 14 | 20.0 | 18 | 24.0 | 4 | 8.0 | 156.0 | 108.0 |
| 12 | CAN | Peter Hall | Toews; Kerigan | KC 168 | 13 | 19.0 | ~~29~~ | ~~35.0~~ | 27 | 33.0 | 8 | 14.0 | 10 | 16.0 | 14 | 20.0 | 13 | 19.0 | 156.0 | 121.0 |
| 13 | CAN | Hans Fogh | John Kerr; Davis | KC 169 | 1 | 0.0 | 5 | 10.0 | 24 | 30.0 | 3 | 5.7 | 5 | 10.0 | ~~DSQ~~ | ~~66.0~~ | PMS | 66.0 | 187.7 | 121.7 |
| 14 | DEN | Valdemar Bandolowski | Erik Hansen; Gelbjerg Hansen | D 83 | 17 | 23.0 | ~~36~~ | ~~42.0~~ | 23 | 29.0 | 4 | 8.0 | 6 | 11.7 | 19 | 25.0 | 22 | 28.0 | 166.7 | 124.7 |
| 15 | CAN | Bill Abbott Jr. | Bill Abbott Sr. Larry Abbott | KC 1 | 25 | 31.0 | 2 | 3.0 | 7 | 13.0 | ~~33~~ | ~~39.0~~ | 23 | 29.0 | 22 | 28.0 | 20 | 26.0 | 169.0 | 130.0 |
| 16 | ITA | Fabio Albarelli | Leopoldo Di Martino; Bonvincini | I 198 | 31 | 37.0 | ~~38~~ | ~~44.0~~ | 12 | 18.0 | 2 | 3.0 | 12 | 18.0 | 21 | 27.0 | 21 | 27.0 | 174.0 | 130.0 |
| 17 | DEN | Peter Kampmann | ? Klaergard | D 81 | 34 | 40.0 | 1 | 0.0 | ~~34~~ | ~~40.0~~ | 25 | 31.0 | 24 | 30.0 | 7 | 13.0 | 11 | 17.0 | 171.0 | 131.0 |
| 18 | AUS | Ahern | Peter Gilmour; Simpson | KA 161 | 4 | 8.0 | 31 | 37.0 | 13 | 19.0 | ~~PMS~~ | ~~66.0~~ | 18 | 24.0 | 16 | 22.0 | 16 | 22.0 | 198.0 | 132.0 |
| 19 | NED | Geert Bakker | Feico Bakker; Pieter Keijzer | H 22 | 28 | 34.0 | 20 | 26.0 | ~~31~~ | ~~37.0~~ | 7 | 13.0 | 22 | 28.0 | 9 | 15.0 | 19 | 25.0 | 178.0 | 141.0 |
| 20 | NOR | Hans Wang | Hauff; Helson | N 96 | 9 | 15.0 | 19 | 25.0 | 17 | 23.0 | 21 | 27.0 | ~~RET~~ | ~~66.0~~ | 36 | 42.0 | 8 | 14.0 | 212.0 | 146.0 |

Legend: DNF – Did not finish; DNS – Did not start; DSQ – Disqualified; RET – Retired;
Discard is crossed out and does not count for the overall result.

- 1981 Progress

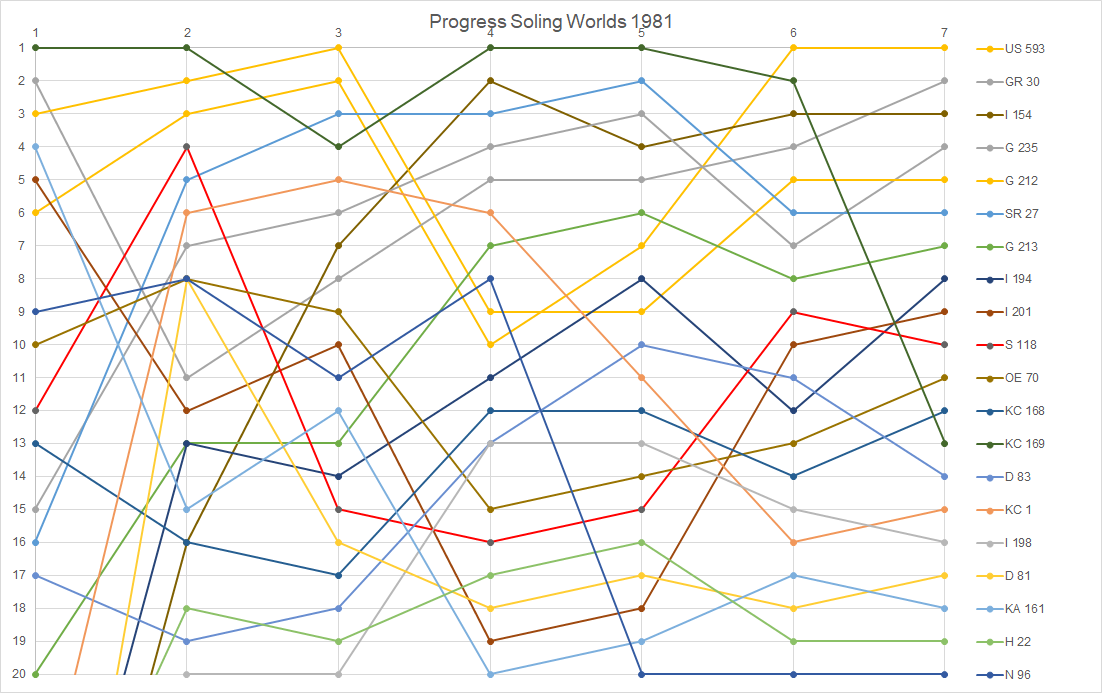

== 1982 Final results ==
1982
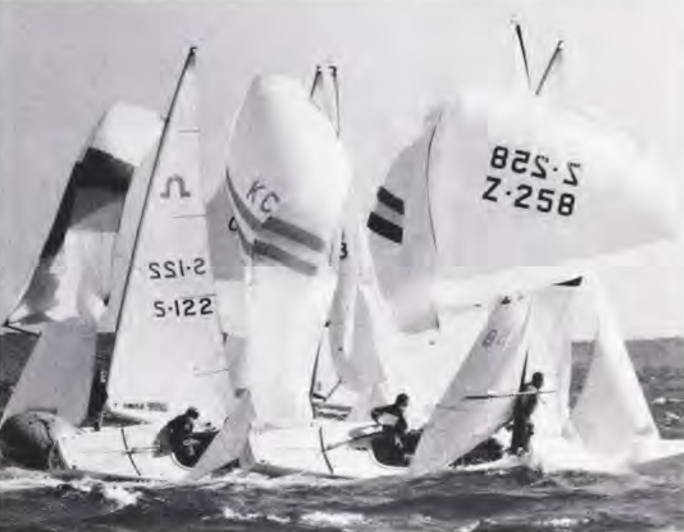

Event title
- Edition: 14
- Host: Fremantle Sailing Club

Event details
- Venue: Fremantle, Australia
- Dates: 8–18 March
- Yachts: 40
- Key people: * Organizing committee: Syd Corser, John Baker: Race officer: Bob Day
- Opened by: Geert Bakker Netherlands
- Opening ceremony: 11 March

Competitors
- Competitors: 120
- Competing nations: 14

Results
- (gold) Gold: Australia; Mark Bethwaite; Ian McDiarmid; Glen Read
- (silver) Silver: Australia; William Packer; Ian Campbell; Robert Hardy
- (bronze) Bronze: United States; Dave Perry; Brad Dellenbaugh; Ed Travelyan

| Rank | Country | Helmsman | Crew | Sail No. | Boat | Race 1 | | Race 2 | | Race 3 | | Race 4 | | Race 5 | | Race 6 | | Total | Total – discard |
| Rank | Country | Helmsman | Crew | Sail No. | Boat | Pos. | Pts. | Pos. | Pts. | Pos. | Pts. | Pos. | Pts. | Pos. | Pts. | Pos. | Pts. | Total | Total – discard |
| 1st place, gold medalist(s) | AUS | Mark Bethwaite | Ian McDiarmid; Glen Read | KA 144 | Verve | 2 | 3.0 | 1 | 0.0 | 4 | 8.0 | 19 | 25.0 | 1 | 0.0 | 2 | 3.0 | 39.0 | 14.0 |
| 2nd place, silver medalist(s) | AUS | William Packer | Ian Campbell; Robert Hardy | KA 151 | Deliverance | 4 | 8.0 | 2 | 3.0 | 1 | 0.0 | 5 | 10.0 | 18 | 24.0 | 5 | 10.0 | 55.0 | 31.0 |
| 3rd place, bronze medalist(s) | USA | Dave Perry | Brad Dellenbaugh; Ed Travelyan | US 710 | Shen | 3 | 5.7 | 7 | 13.0 | 5 | 10.0 | 2 | 3.0 | 7 | 13.0 | 4 | 8.0 | 52.7 | 39.7 |
| 4 | DEN | Valdemar Bandolowski | Not documented | D 85 | Nord Jydland | 1 | 0.0 | 3 | 5.7 | 9 | 15.0 | 16 | 22.0 | 6 | 11.7 | 8 | 14.0 | 68.4 | 46.4 |
| 5 | GER | Fritz Geis | Richard Fricke; Karl Fricke | G 212 | Love Boat for 3 | 11 | 17.0 | 5 | 10.0 | 3 | 5.7 | 17 | 23.0 | 16 | 22.0 | 3 | 5.7 | 83.4 | 60.4 |
| 6 | GER | Wilhelm Kuhweide | Eckhard Löll; Axel May | G 205 | Darling | 12 | 18.0 | 9 | 15.0 | 8 | 14.0 | 12 | 18.0 | 3 | 5.7 | 9 | 15.0 | 85.7 | 67.7 |
| 7 | AUS | Peter Gilmour | Lachy Simpson; Lloyd Lissiman | KA 143 | Whip It | 14 | 20.0 | 12 | 18.0 | 13 | 19.0 | 1 | 0.0 | 10 | 16.0 | 13 | 19.0 | 92.0 | 72.0 |
| 8 | SWE | Erik Thorsell | Not documented | S 122 | Phillipa | 17 | 23.0 | 14 | 20.0 | 2 | 3.0 | 6 | 11.7 | 27 | 33.0 | 10 | 16.0 | 106.7 | 73.7 |
| 9 | AUS | John Savage | Not documented | KA 152 | Egavas | 5 | 10.0 | 15 | 21.0 | 11 | 17.0 | 8 | 14.0 | 8 | 14.0 | 16 | 22.0 | 98.0 | 76.0 |
| 10 | CAN | Hans Fogh | Not documented | KC 169 | Flying Doctor | 6 | 11.7 | DNF | 47.0 | 6 | 11.7 | 3 | 5.7 | 2 | 3.0 | DSQ | 47.0 | 126.1 | 79.1 |
| 11 | NOR | Hans Wang | Not documented | N 96 | Klappfot | DNF | 47.0 | 13 | 19.0 | 7 | 13.0 | 11 | 17.0 | 15 | 21.0 | 7 | 13.0 | 130.0 | 83.0 |
| 12 | GBR | Chris Law | Edward Leask; Jeremy Richards | K 139 | The Italian Job | 16 | 22.0 | 17 | 23.0 | 15 | 21.0 | 18 | 24.0 | 21 | 27.0 | 1 | 0.0 | 117.0 | 90.0 |
| 13 | CAN | Bill Abbott Jr. | Bill Abbott Sr. Larry Abbott | KC 1 | Odds N Ends | 13 | 19.0 | 19 | 25.0 | 29 | 35.0 | 4 | 8.0 | 17 | 23.0 | 11 | 17.0 | 127.0 | 92.0 |
| 14 | AUS | Syd Corser | Not documented | KA 153 | Darkie | 7 | 13.0 | 6 | 11.7 | 28 | 34.0 | 22 | 28.0 | 13 | 19.0 | 20 | 26.0 | 131.7 | 97.7 |
| 15 | AUS | Michael Ahern | Not documented | KA 158 | Lightning strike | 22 | 28.0 | 10 | 16.0 | 18 | 24.0 | 9 | 15.0 | 31 | 37.0 | 15 | 21.0 | 141.0 | 104.0 |
| 16 | NZL | Tom Dodson | Simon Daubney; Aran Hansen | KZ 16 | NN | 18 | 24.0 | 11 | 17.0 | 12 | 18.0 | 23 | 29.0 | 23 | 29.0 | 12 | 18.0 | 135.0 | 106.0 |
| 17 | AUS | Tony Manford | Not documented | KA 149 | Hopscotch | 10 | 16.0 | 23 | 29.0 | 10 | 16.0 | 29 | 35.0 | 22 | 28.0 | 17 | 23.0 | 147.0 | 112.0 |
| 18 | ITA | Gianluca Lamaro | Aurelio Dalla Vecchia; Valerio Romano | I 222 | Nirvana | 15 | 21.0 | 16 | 22.0 | 16 | 22.0 | 15 | 21.0 | 20 | 26.0 | DSQ | 47.0 | 159.0 | 112.0 |
| 19 | ITA | Giuseppe Bolens | Ernesto Bolens; Guidotti | I 194 | Lektra | 9 | 15.0 | DSQ | 47.0 | 20 | 26.0 | 20 | 26.0 | 11 | 17.0 | 25 | 31.0 | 162.0 | 115.0 |
| 20 | NOR | Odd Roar Lofterød | Not documented | N 100 | NN | 21 | 27.0 | 26 | 32.0 | DNF | 47.0 | 14 | 20.0 | 4 | 8.0 | 23 | 29.0 | 163.0 | 116.0 |
| 21 | AUS | Gary Sheard | Tim Dorning; Dean Gordon | KA 151 | Cobra | 26 | 32.0 | 8 | 14.0 | 19 | 25.0 | 38 | 44.0 | 19 | 25.0 | 14 | 20.0 | 160.0 | 116.0 |
| 22 | AUS | M. Manford | Not documented | KA 142 | Aphrodite | 29 | 35.0 | DSQ | 47.0 | 31 | 37.0 | 7 | 13.0 | 14 | 20.0 | 6 | 11.7 | 163.7 | 116.7 |
| 23 | USA | Stuart H. Walker | Not documented | US 725 | Old Glory | 23 | 29.0 | 4 | 8.0 | 17 | 23.0 | 32 | 38.0 | 33 | 39.0 | 24 | 30.0 | 167.0 | 128.0 |
| 24 | SUI | Alain Testuz | Not documented | Z 258 | Odds N Ends | 19 | 25.0 | 25 | 31.0 | 23 | 29.0 | 10 | 16.0 | 30 | 36.0 | 27 | 33.0 | 170.0 | 134.0 |
| 25 | GER | Curt Noel | Not documented | G 229 | NN | 27 | 33.0 | 21 | 27.0 | 24 | 30.0 | 31 | 37.0 | 5 | 10.0 | 32 | 38.0 | 175.0 | 137.0 |
| 26 | NED | Geert Bakker | Dick Coster; Rudy den Outer | H 22 | Matilda | 33 | 39.0 | 22 | 28.0 | 14 | 20.0 | 30 | 36.0 | 24 | 30.0 | 19 | 25.0 | 178.0 | 139.0 |
| 27 | AUS | R. Waller | Not documented | KA 159 | NN | 20 | 26.0 | 21 | 27.0 | 21 | 27.0 | 27 | 33.0 | 28 | 34.0 | 21 | 27.0 | 174.0 | 140.0 |
| 28 | AUS | G. Dingemann | Not documented | KA 124 | Adios | 8 | 14.0 | DNF | 47.0 | 32 | 38.0 | 25 | 31.0 | 29 | 35.0 | 18 | 24.0 | 189.0 | 142.0 |
| 29 | AUS | R. Haldane | Not documented | KA 161 | Merrijig | 31 | 37.0 | 20 | 26.0 | 26 | 32.0 | 26 | 32.0 | 12 | 18.0 | 29 | 35.0 | 180.0 | 143.0 |
| 30 | AUT | Michael Farthofer | Christian Holler; Richard Holler | OE 73 | Beichara III | DSQ | 47.0 | RET | 47.0 | 22 | 28.0 | 24 | 30.0 | 9 | 15.0 | 31 | 37.0 | 204.0 | 157.0 |
| 31 | ITA | A. Sciolari | Not documented | I 200 | Bounty Four | 35 | 41.0 | 30 | 36.0 | 34 | 40.0 | 13 | 19.0 | 25 | 31.0 | 26 | 32.0 | 199.0 | 158.0 |
| 32 | NZL | R. Roberts | Not documented | KZ 15 | Solong | 24 | 30.0 | 18 | 24.0 | 27 | 33.0 | 36 | 42.0 | 35 | 41.0 | 30 | 36.0 | 206.0 | 164.0 |
| 33 | AUS | J. Baron Hay | Not documented | KA 155 | TEN | 32 | 38.0 | 28 | 34.0 | 30 | 36.0 | 21 | 27.0 | 26 | 32.0 | 33 | 39.0 | 206.0 | 167.0 |
| 34 | AUS | J. Schramm | Not documented | KA 160 | Humble Pie | 25 | 31.0 | 18 | 24.0 | 36 | 42.0 | 33 | 39.0 | 32 | 38.0 | DSQ | 47.0 | 221.0 | 174.0 |
| 35 | AUS | Noel Robins | Not documented | KA 154 | Taworri | 28 | 34.0 | DNF | 47.0 | 35 | 41.0 | 28 | 34.0 | 36 | 42.0 | 22 | 28.0 | 226.0 | 179.0 |
| 36 | CAN | Jim Beatty | Not documented | KC 162 | Gitana | 30 | 36.0 | DSQ | 47.0 | 25 | 31.0 | 37 | 43.0 | 38 | 44.0 | 28 | 34.0 | 235.0 | 188.0 |
| 37 | FRA | A. Forgeot | Not documented | F 139 | Bloody Mayri | 36 | 42.0 | 29 | 35.0 | 33 | 39.0 | 33 | 39.0 | 34 | 40.0 | 34 | 40.0 | 235.0 | 193.0 |
| 38 | GER | R. Persike | Not documented | G 199 | Sundance | 37 | 43.0 | 31 | 37.0 | 37 | 43.0 | 35 | 41.0 | 37 | 43.0 | 36 | 42.0 | 249.0 | 206.0 |
| 39 | NZL | A. Ballintine | Not documented | KZ 10 | Ghost | 34 | 40.0 | 27 | 33.0 | RET | 47.0 | 39 | 45.0 | DNF | 47.0 | 35 | 41.0 | 253.0 | 206.0 |
| 40 | NOR | O. Otterlei | Not documented | N 99 | Revenge | 38 | 44.0 | DNF | 47.0 | 38 | 44.0 | 40 | 46.0 | DNS | 47.0 | DNF | 47.0 | 275.0 | 228.0 |

Legend: DNF – Did not finish; DNS – Did not start; DSQ – Disqualified; RET – Retired;
Discard is crossed out and does not count for the overall result.

- 1982 Progress

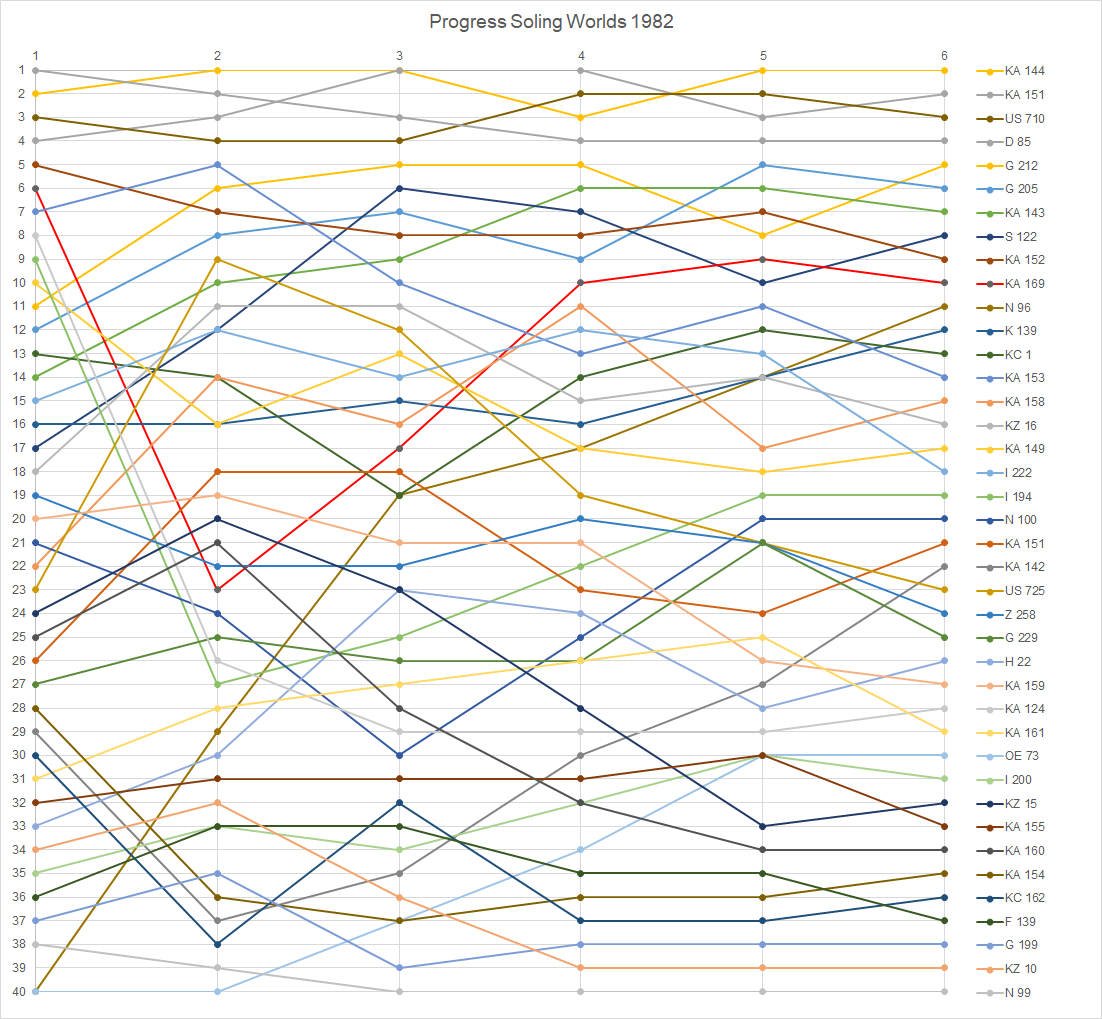

== 1983 Final results ==
1983
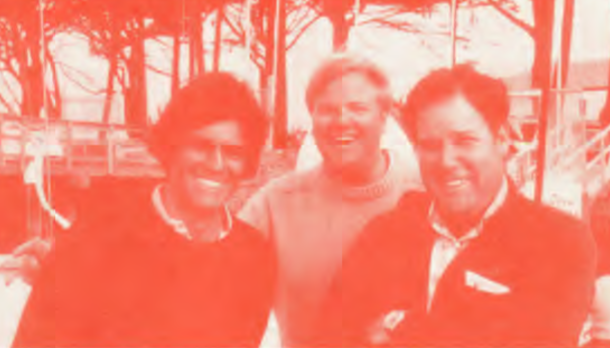

Event title
- Edition: 15
- Host: St. Francis Yacht Club

Event details
- Venue: Berkeley Circle, San Francisco, United States
- Dates: 10–23 July
- Yachts: 54
- Key people: * Gerry Price, Chairman of the event: Jim Taylor, Race Officer<; Dick Johnson, International Judge
- Opening ceremony: 16 July

Competitors
- Competitors: 163
- Competing nations: 17

Results
- (gold) Gold: United States; Robbie Haines; Vicente Brun; Robert Kinney
- (silver) Silver: United States; Dave Curtis; John Engel; Wally Corwin
- (bronze) Bronze: Australia; Peter Gilmour; Lachy Simpson; Lloyd Lissiman

| Rank | Country | Helmsman | Crew | Sail No. | Race 1 | | Race 2 | | Race 3 | | Race 4 | | Race 5 | | Race 6 | | Race 7 | | Total | Total – discard |
| Rank | Country | Helmsman | Crew | Sail No. | Pos. | Pts. | Pos. | Pts. | Pos. | Pts. | Pos. | Pts. | Pos. | Pts. | Pos. | Pts. | Pos. | Pts. | Total | Total – discard |
| 1st place, gold medalist(s) | USA | Robbie Haines | Vicente Brun; Robert Kinney | US 747 | ~~RET~~ | ~~61.0~~ | 1 | 0.0 | 1 | 0.0 | 1 | 0.0 | 1 | 0.0 | 7 | 13.0 | 6 | 11.7 | 85.7 | 24.7 |
| 2nd place, silver medalist(s) | USA | Dave Curtis | John Engel; Wally Corwin | US 727 | 1 | 0.0 | 2 | 3.0 | 3 | 5.7 | 2 | 3.0 | 3 | 5.7 | 11 | 17.0 | ~~DNF~~ | ~~61.0~~ | 95.4 | 34.4 |
| 3rd place, bronze medalist(s) | AUS | Peter Gilmour | Lachy Simpson; Lloyd Lissiman | KA 157 | 3 | 5.7 | 6 | 11.7 | ~~13~~ | ~~19.0~~ | 10 | 16.0 | 12 | 18.0 | 1 | 0.0 | 13 | 19.0 | 89.4 | 70.4 |
| 4 | USA | Ed Baird | Not documented | US 745 | 9 | 15.0 | ~~PMS~~ | ~~61.0~~ | 5 | 10.0 | 3 | 5.7 | 20 | 26.0 | 6 | 11.7 | 1 | 0.0 | 129.4 | 68.4 |
| 5 | GER | Willy Kuhweide | Eckhard Löll; Axel May | G 245 | 2 | 3.0 | 4 | 8.0 | ~~15~~ | ~~21.0~~ | 11 | 17.0 | 8 | 14.0 | 12 | 18.0 | 9 | 15.0 | 96.0 | 75.0 |
| 6 | CAN | Hans Fogh | Not documented | KC 169 | 10 | 16.0 | ~~12~~ | ~~18.0~~ | 6 | 11.7 | 9 | 15.0 | 11 | 17.0 | 5 | 10.0 | 3 | 5.7 | 93.4 | 75.4 |
| 7 | GER | Fritz Geis | Richard Fricke; Karl Fricke | G 244 | 5 | 10.0 | 7 | 13.0 | 8 | 14.0 | 5 | 10.0 | 9 | 15.0 | 4 | 8.0 | ~~DNF~~ | ~~61.0~~ | 131.0 | 70.0 |
| 8 | BRA | Torben Grael | Daniel Adler; Ronaldo Senfft | BL 45 | 12 | 18.0 | 14 | 20.0 | 7 | 13.0 | 4 | 8.0 | ~~23~~ | ~~29.0~~ | 8 | 14.0 | 11 | 17.0 | 119.0 | 90.0 |
| 9 | USA | Dave Chaplin | Not documented | US 751 | 7 | 13.0 | ~~PMS~~ | ~~61.0~~ | 2 | 3.0 | 7 | 13.0 | 10 | 16.0 | 18 | 24.0 | 17 | 23.0 | 153.0 | 92.0 |
| 10 | GBR | Chris Law | Edward Leask; Jeremy Richards | K 140 | 6 | 11.7 | 13 | 19.0 | 19 | 25.0 | ~~PMS~~ | ~~61.0~~ | 18 | 24.0 | 3 | 5.7 | 7 | 13.0 | 159.4 | 98.4 |
| 11 | CAN | Bill Abbott Jr. | Bill Abbott Sr. Larry Abbott | KC 1 | 25 | 31.0 | 9 | 15.0 | ~~25~~ | ~~31.0~~ | 19 | 25.0 | 6 | 11.7 | 2 | 3.0 | 12 | 18.0 | 134.7 | 103.7 |
| 12 | AUS | Mark Bethwaite | Ian McDiarmid; Glen Read | KA 144 | 4 | 8.0 | 8 | 14.0 | ~~PMS~~ | ~~61.0~~ | DSQ | 61.0 | 2 | 3.0 | 9 | 15.0 | 2 | 3.0 | 165.0 | 104.0 |
| 13 | USA | Jeff Madrigali | Not documented | US 706 | 17 | 23.0 | ~~24~~ | ~~30.0~~ | 20 | 26.0 | 12 | 18.0 | 4 | 8.0 | 10 | 16.0 | 8 | 14.0 | 135.0 | 105.0 |
| 14 | USA | Dave Perry | Not documented | US 710 | 11 | 17.0 | ~~22~~ | ~~28.0~~ | 12 | 18.0 | 15 | 21.0 | 7 | 13.0 | 17 | 23.0 | 15 | 21.0 | 141.0 | 113.0 |
| 15 | NZL | Tom Dodson | Simon Daubney; Aran Hansen | KZ 16 | 5 | 10.0 | 5 | 10.0 | 4 | 8.0 | ~~DSQ~~ | ~~61.0~~ | DSQ | 61.0 | 15 | 21.0 | 5 | 10.0 | 181.0 | 120.0 |
| 16 | AUS | Barry Waller | Not documented | KA 159 | 24 | 30.0 | 10 | 16.0 | 14 | 20.0 | 14 | 20.0 | 14 | 20.0 | ~~41~~ | ~~47.0~~ | 19 | 25.0 | 178.0 | 131.0 |
| 17 | ITA | Giuseppe Milone | Not documented | I 223 | 16 | 22.0 | 11 | 17.0 | ~~27~~ | ~~33.0~~ | 16 | 22.0 | 15 | 21.0 | 16 | 22.0 | 21 | 27.0 | 164.0 | 131.0 |
| 18 | DEN | Jesper Bank | Not documented | D 83 | 8 | 14.0 | 20 | 26.0 | ~~23~~ | ~~29.0~~ | 18 | 24.0 | 16 | 22.0 | 19 | 25.0 | 18 | 24.0 | 164.0 | 135.0 |
| 19 | ITA | Guiseppe Lamaro | Not documented | I 222 | 23 | 29.0 | 17 | 23.0 | 10 | 16.0 | 17 | 23.0 | 19 | 25.0 | ~~27~~ | ~~33.0~~ | 14 | 20.0 | 169.0 | 136.0 |
| 20 | DEN | William Friis-Moller | Not documented | D 85 | 21 | 27.0 | 16 | 22.0 | 16 | 22.0 | 13 | 19.0 | 22 | 28.0 | 13 | 19.0 | ~~26~~ | ~~32.0~~ | 169.0 | 137.0 |
| 21 | NOR | Dag Usterud | Not documented | N 101 | ~~DSQ~~ | ~~61.0~~ | 3 | 5.7 | 5 | 10.0 | 20 | 26.0 | 21 | 27.0 | 25 | 31.0 | DSQ | 61.0 | 221.7 | 160.7 |
| 22 | AUS | Gary Sheard | Not documented | KA 165 | 20 | 26.0 | PMS | 61.0 | 22 | 28.0 | 6 | 11.7 | 5 | 10.0 | 20 | 26.0 | ~~DSQ~~ | ~~61.0~~ | 223.7 | 162.7 |
| 23 | DEN | Valdemar Bandolowski | Not documented | D 84 | 14 | 20.0 | 15 | 21.0 | ~~PMS~~ | ~~61.0~~ | DNF | 61.0 | 24 | 30.0 | 14 | 20.0 | 10 | 16.0 | 229.0 | 168.0 |
| 24 | USA | Don Cohan | Not documented | US 723 | ~~34~~ | ~~40.0~~ | 21 | 27.0 | 21 | 27.0 | 24 | 30.0 | 14 | 20.0 | 26 | 32.0 | 16 | 22.0 | 198.0 | 158.0 |
| 25 | SUI | M. Vuithier | Not documented | Z 259 | 26 | 32.0 | 35 | 41.0 | 24 | 30.0 | 8 | 14.0 | 29 | 35.0 | ~~31~~ | ~~37.0~~ | 25 | 31.0 | 220.0 | 179.0 |
| 26 | NED | Ben Staartjes | Kobus Vandenberg; Steven Bakker | H 17 | ~~DNF~~ | ~~61.0~~ | 19 | 25.0 | 18 | 24.0 | PMS | 61.0 | 13 | 19.0 | 23 | 29.0 | 22 | 28.0 | 247.0 | 186.0 |
| 27 | SWE | Magnus Grävare | Not documented | S 128 | 13 | 19.0 | 31 | 37.0 | 17 | 23.0 | 29 | 35.0 | ~~DSQ~~ | ~~61.0~~ | 33 | 39.0 | 30 | 36.0 | 250.0 | 189.0 |
| 28 | USA | David Franzel | Not documented | US 704 | 19 | 25.0 | 26 | 32.0 | 26 | 32.0 | 31 | 37.0 | 32 | 38.0 | 22 | 28.0 | ~~35~~ | ~~41.0~~ | 233.0 | 192.0 |
| 29 | USA | Scott Easom | Not documented | US 743 | 22 | 28.0 | 27 | 33.0 | ~~DNF~~ | ~~61.0~~ | 26 | 32.0 | 26 | 32.0 | DSQ | 61.0 | 4 | 8.0 | 255.0 | 194.0 |
| 30 | GRE | Tassos Boudouris | Not documented | GR 30 | 18 | 24.0 | 23 | 29.0 | 30 | 36.0 | ~~PMS~~ | ~~61.0~~ | 17 | 23.0 | 21 | 27.0 | DSQ | 61.0 | 261.0 | 200.0 |
| 31 | NOR | John Petterssen | Not documented | N 90 | 33 | 39.0 | 18 | 24.0 | ~~DSQ~~ | ~~61.0~~ | 28 | 34.0 | 24 | 30.0 | 36 | 42.0 | 27 | 33.0 | 263.0 | 202.0 |
| 32 | CAN | Banford Riley | Not documented | KC 167 | 28 | 34.0 | 28 | 34.0 | 32 | 38.0 | 30 | 36.0 | 31 | 37.0 | ~~34~~ | ~~40.0~~ | 24 | 30.0 | 249.0 | 209.0 |
| 33 | CAN | Jim Beatty | Not documented | KC 162 | YMP | 33.0 | 25 | 31.0 | ~~DSQ~~ | ~~61.0~~ | 23 | 29.0 | 33 | 39.0 | 29 | 35.0 | 38 | 44.0 | 272.0 | 211.0 |
| 34 | SWE | Hans Liljeblad | Not documented | S 132 | 27 | 33.0 | ~~DNF~~ | ~~61.0~~ | 11 | 17.0 | 22 | 28.0 | 37 | 43.0 | 45 | 51.0 | 40 | 46.0 | 279.0 | 218.0 |
| 35 | USA | Jim Medley | Not documented | US 701 | 29 | 35.0 | ~~PMS~~ | ~~61.0~~ | 28 | 34.0 | 27 | 33.0 | 25 | 31.0 | DNF | 61.0 | 23 | 29.0 | 284.0 | 223.0 |
| 36 | JPN | Shigeki Hidaka | Not documented | J 20 | 32 | 38.0 | 32 | 38.0 | ~~37~~ | ~~43.0~~ | 34 | 40.0 | 36 | 42.0 | 28 | 34.0 | 28 | 34.0 | 269.0 | 226.0 |
| 37 | SWE | Valter Saaristu | Not documented | S 121 | 37 | 43.0 | ~~PMS~~ | ~~61.0~~ | 31 | 37.0 | 21 | 27.0 | 40 | 46.0 | 40 | 46.0 | 33 | 39.0 | 299.0 | 238.0 |
| 38 | USA | Karin Campia - Olsen | Not documented | US 676 | 35 | 41.0 | 33 | 39.0 | 38 | 44.0 | 33 | 39.0 | 39 | 45.0 | 24 | 30.0 | ~~DSQ~~ | ~~61.0~~ | 299.0 | 238.0 |
| 39 | AUT | Michael Farthofer | Christian Holler; Richard Holler | OE 73 | 30 | 36.0 | ~~DNS~~ | ~~61.0~~ | 33 | 39.0 | 36 | 42.0 | 30 | 36.0 | 42 | 48.0 | 32 | 38.0 | 300.0 | 239.0 |
| 40 | JPN | Takaharu Hirosama | Not documented | J 25 | ~~DNF~~ | ~~61.0~~ | 36 | 42.0 | 42 | 48.0 | 25 | 31.0 | 35 | 41.0 | 32 | 38.0 | 36 | 42.0 | 303.0 | 242.0 |
| 41 | AUS | Colin Lovelady | Not documented | KA 125 | 31 | 37.0 | 34 | 40.0 | 35 | 41.0 | 32 | 38.0 | ~~38~~ | ~~44.0~~ | 38 | 44.0 | 37 | 43.0 | 287.0 | 243.0 |
| 42 | USA | Bob Park | Not documented | US 736 | 38 | 44.0 | 30 | 36.0 | 40 | 46.0 | 35 | 41.0 | ~~41~~ | ~~47.0~~ | 37 | 43.0 | 34 | 40.0 | 297.0 | 250.0 |
| 43 | USA | Joe Hoeksema | Rose Hoeksema; Not documented | US 744 | 39 | 45.0 | ~~DSQ~~ | ~~61.0~~ | DNF | 61.0 | DNS | 61.0 | 27 | 33.0 | 30 | 36.0 | 20 | 26.0 | 323.0 | 262.0 |
| 44 | GER | Daniel Diesing | Not documented | G 225 | 36 | 42.0 | 29 | 35.0 | 34 | 40.0 | ~~DNS~~ | ~~61.0~~ | 43 | 49.0 | 47 | 53.0 | 44 | 50.0 | 330.0 | 269.0 |
| 45 | GER | Rudolf Persike | Not documented | G 199 | ~~43~~ | ~~49.0~~ | 39 | 45.0 | 39 | 45.0 | 18 | 24.0 | 42 | 48.0 | 43 | 49.0 | 39 | 45.0 | 305.0 | 256.0 |
| 46 | USA | Robert Berg | Not documented | US 675 | 42 | 48.0 | ~~DNF~~ | ~~61.0~~ | 36 | 42.0 | DNF | 61.0 | 48 | 54.0 | 35 | 41.0 | 29 | 35.0 | 342.0 | 281.0 |
| 47 | USA | John Powell | Not documented | US 686 | 40 | 46.0 | 37 | 43.0 | ~~46~~ | ~~52.0~~ | 37 | 43.0 | 44 | 50.0 | 46 | 52.0 | 41 | 47.0 | 333.0 | 281.0 |
| 48 | USA | Brian Pace | Not documented | US 544 | 41 | 47.0 | 38 | 44.0 | 41 | 47.0 | ~~DNF~~ | ~~61.0~~ | 47 | 53.0 | 44 | 50.0 | 42 | 48.0 | 350.0 | 289.0 |
| 49 | PAK | Khalid Akhtan | Not documented | PK 3 | ~~DNF~~ | ~~61.0~~ | DNF | 61.0 | 43 | 49.0 | 39 | 45.0 | 46 | 52.0 | 39 | 45.0 | 43 | 49.0 | 362.0 | 301.0 |
| 50 | ISV | Jean Braure | Not documented | VI 3 | 45 | 51.0 | 40 | 46.0 | 47 | 53.0 | 41 | 47.0 | ~~DNF~~ | ~~61.0~~ | 48 | 54.0 | 45 | 51.0 | 363.0 | 302.0 |
| 51 | SUI | Alain Testuz | Not documented | Z 258 | ~~PMS~~ | ~~61.0~~ | DNS | 61.0 | 29 | 35.0 | PMS | 61.0 | 45 | 51.0 | DNS | 61.0 | 31 | 37.0 | 367.0 | 306.0 |
| 52 | USA | Martha Keys | Not documented | US 733 | 44 | 50.0 | ~~DNS~~ | ~~61.0~~ | 44 | 50.0 | 42 | 48.0 | 49 | 55.0 | 49 | 55.0 | 46 | 52.0 | 371.0 | 310.0 |
| 53 | USA | Tom Kenefick | Not documented | US 660 | ~~DNF~~ | ~~61.0~~ | 41 | 47.0 | 45 | 51.0 | 40 | 46.0 | DNS | 61.0 | 50 | 56.0 | 47 | 53.0 | 375.0 | 314.0 |
| 54 | BRA | José Paulo Dias | Not documented | BL 34 | ~~DSQ~~ | ~~61.0~~ | DSQ | 61.0 | DSQ | 61.0 | DSQ | 61.0 | DSQ | 61.0 | DSQ | 61.0 | DSQ | 61.0 | 427.0 | 366.0 |

Legend: DNF – Did not finish; DNS – Did not start; DSQ – Disqualified;
Discard is crossed out and does not count for the overall result.

- 1983 Progress

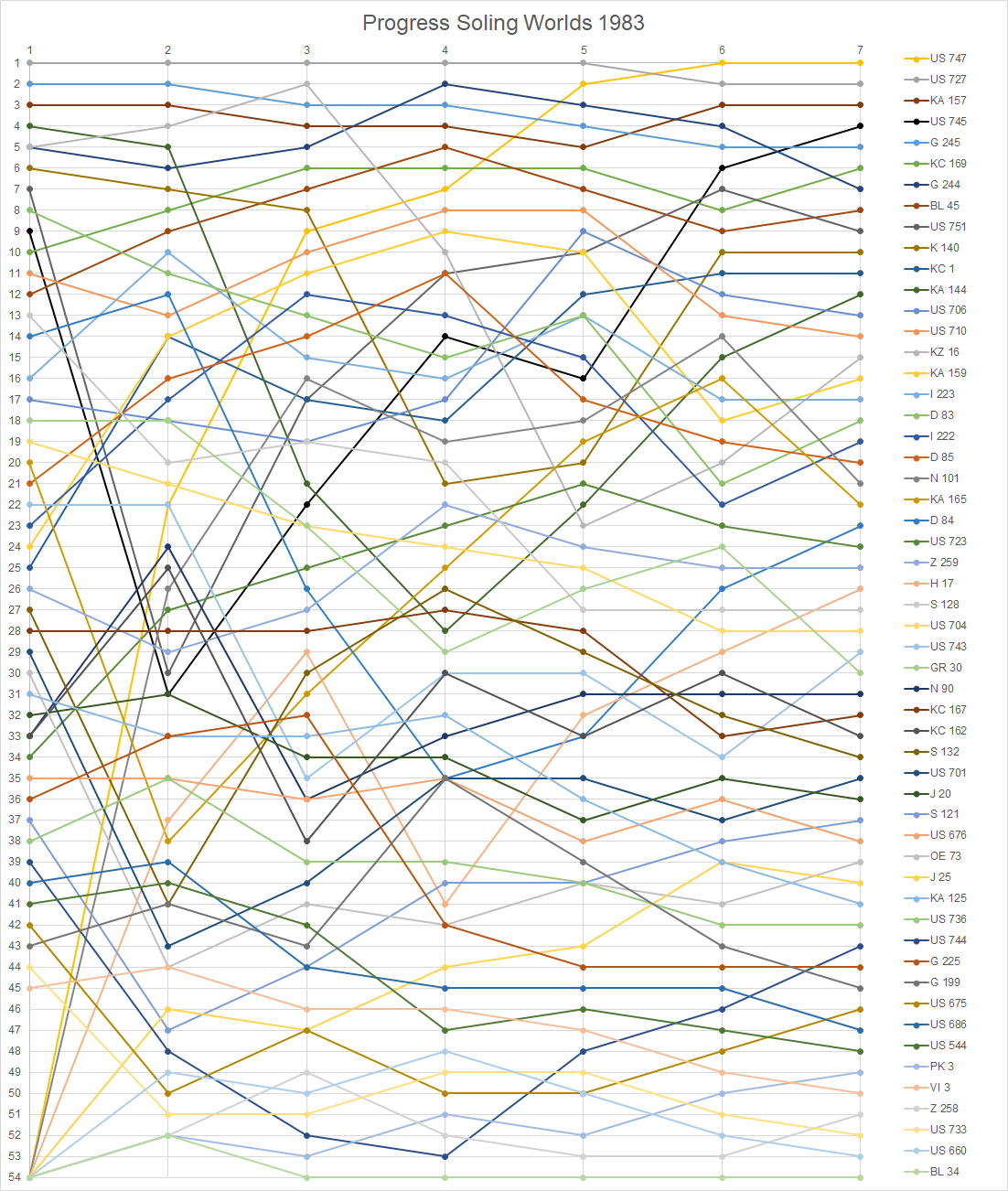

== 1984 Final results ==
1984
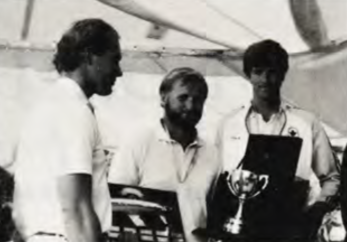

Event title
- Edition: 16
- Host: Circolo Vela Torbole

Event details
- Venue: Torbole, Italy
- Dates: 15–25 September
- Yachts: 64
- Opening ceremony: 18 September

Competitors
- Competitors: 192
- Competing nations: 18

Results
- (gold) Gold: Denmark; Valdemar Bandolowski; Steve Calder; Theis Palm
- (silver) Silver: Soviet Union; Boris Budnikov; Gennadi Strakh; Oleg Miron
- (bronze) Bronze: East Germany; Helmar Nauck; Norbert Hellriegel; Sven Diedering

| Rank | Country | Helmsman | Crew | Sail No. | Race 1 | | Race 2 | | Race 3 | | Race 4 | | Race 5 | | Race 6 | | Race 7 | | Total | Total – discard |
| Rank | Country | Helmsman | Crew | Sail No. | Pos. | Pts. | Pos. | Pts. | Pos. | Pts. | Pos. | Pts. | Pos. | Pts. | Pos. | Pts. | Pos. | Pts. | Total | Total – discard |
| 1st place, gold medalist(s) | DEN | Valdemar Bandolowski | Theis Palm; Steve Calder | D 84 | 6 | 11.7 | ~~11~~ | ~~17.0~~ | 6 | 11.7 | 2 | 3.0 | 6 | 11.7 | 4 | 8.0 | 1 | 0.0 | 63.1 | 46.1 |
| 2nd place, silver medalist(s) | URS | Boris Budnikov | Gennedi Strakh; Oleg Miron | SR 33 | 1 | 0.0 | ~~19~~ | ~~25.0~~ | 7 | 13.0 | 5 | 10.0 | 9 | 15.0 | 2 | 3.0 | 8 | 14.0 | 80.0 | 55.0 |
| 3rd place, bronze medalist(s) | GDR | Helmar Nauck | Sven Diedering; Norbert Hellriegel | DDR 4 | 10 | 16.0 | 2 | 3.0 | ~~23~~ | ~~29.0~~ | 12 | 18.0 | 3 | 5.7 | 7 | 13.0 | 2 | 3.0 | 87.7 | 58.7 |
| 4 | CAN | Bill Abbott Jr. | Larry Abbott; Don Beatty | KC 1 | 2 | 3.0 | 8 | 14.0 | 20 | 26.0 | ~~DSQ~~ | ~~71.0~~ | 11 | 17.0 | 1 | 0.0 | 5 | 10.0 | 141.0 | 70.0 |
| 5 | AUS | Peter Gilmour | Murray; Simpson | KA 157 | 11 | 17.0 | 17 | 23.0 | 1 | 0.0 | 4 | 8.0 | ~~DSQ~~ | ~~71.0~~ | 9 | 15.0 | 7 | 13.0 | 147.0 | 76.0 |
| 6 | USA | Don Cohan | John Engel; Andreas Josenhans | US 723 | 12 | 18.0 | 21 | 27.0 | 3 | 5.7 | 11 | 17.0 | 2 | 3.0 | 5 | 10.0 | ~~39~~ | ~~45.0~~ | 125.7 | 80.7 |
| 7 | AUT | Michael Farthofer | Christian Holler; Richard Holler | OE 73 | ~~30~~ | ~~36.0~~ | 1 | 0.0 | 18 | 24.0 | 6 | 11.7 | 7 | 13.0 | 14 | 20.0 | 13 | 19.0 | 123.7 | 87.7 |
| 8 | FRG | Thomas Jungblut | Matthias Adamczewski; Not documented | G 232 | 8 | 14.0 | 7 | 13.0 | 17 | 23.0 | 10 | 16.0 | 12 | 18.0 | ~~22~~ | ~~28.0~~ | 9 | 15.0 | 127.0 | 99.0 |
| 9 | FRG | Roman Koch | Maxl Koch; Link | G 242 | ~~19~~ | ~~25.0~~ | 3 | 5.7 | 22 | 28.0 | 13 | 19.0 | 5 | 10.0 | DSQ | 71.0 | 12 | 18.0 | 176.7 | 105.7 |
| 10 | GDR | Wolf Richter | Thomas Flach; Bernd Jäkel | DDR 1 | ~~PMS~~ | ~~71.0~~ | 5 | 10.0 | 14 | 20.0 | 7 | 13.0 | 13 | 19.0 | 26 | 32.0 | 6 | 11.7 | 176.7 | 105.7 |
| 11 | FRG | Fritz Geis | Moeckl; Wöhrer | G 244 | 3 | 5.7 | 20 | 26.0 | 8 | 14.0 | 9 | 15.0 | 15 | 21.0 | ~~27~~ | ~~33.0~~ | 20 | 26.0 | 140.7 | 107.7 |
| 12 | NOR | Terje Wang | Malm; Pettersen | N 96 | 7 | 13.0 | 15 | 21.0 | 16 | 22.0 | ~~24~~ | ~~30.0~~ | 1 | 0.0 | 21 | 27.0 | 18 | 24.0 | 137.0 | 107.0 |
| 13 | DEN | Jerper Bank | Jan Mathiasen; Kjolhede | D 83 | 14 | 20.0 | 10 | 16.0 | 4 | 8.0 | 19 | 25.0 | 14 | 20.0 | ~~25~~ | ~~31.0~~ | 14 | 20.0 | 140.0 | 109.0 |
| 14 | ITA | Flavio Favini | Marco di Natale; Roberto Passoni | I 154 | 13 | 19.0 | 18 | 24.0 | 29 | 35.0 | 9 | 15.0 | ~~32~~ | ~~38.0~~ | 12 | 18.0 | 4 | 8.0 | 157.0 | 119.0 |
| 15 | FIN | Tom Jungell | Mannstrom; Harima | L 47 | 4 | 8.0 | 12 | 18.0 | ~~26~~ | ~~32.0~~ | 20 | 26.0 | 19 | 25.0 | 19 | 25.0 | 11 | 17.0 | 151.0 | 119.0 |
| 16 | FRG | Erich Hirt Jr. | Neufink; Moessang | G 219 | 18 | 24.0 | 6 | 11.7 | 15 | 21.0 | 16 | 22.0 | 16 | 22.0 | 13 | 19.0 | ~~28~~ | ~~34.0~~ | 153.7 | 119.7 |
| 17 | GRE | Tassos Boudouris | Dimitrios Deligiannis; Antonios Bountouris | GR 30 | ~~DSQ~~ | ~~71.0~~ | 13 | 19.0 | DSQ | 71.0 | 3 | 5.7 | 10 | 16.0 | 3 | 5.7 | 3 | 5.7 | 194.1 | 123.1 |
| 18 | DEN | William Frits Moller | Nilsen; Nilsen | D 85 | 16 | 22.0 | 22 | 28.0 | ~~28~~ | ~~34.0~~ | 14 | 20.0 | 4 | 8.0 | 8 | 14.0 | 26 | 32.0 | 158.0 | 124.0 |
| 19 | NOR | Dag Usterud | Børre Skui; Stein Lund Halvorsen | N 101 | ~~PMS~~ | ~~71.0~~ | DSQ | 71.0 | 2 | 3.0 | 1 | 0.0 | 8 | 14.0 | 16 | 22.0 | 19 | 25.0 | 206.0 | 135.0 |
| 20 | FRG | Karl Haist | Anderson; S. Nikolaus | G 252 | 5 | 10.0 | ~~RET~~ | ~~71.0~~ | 5 | 10.0 | 18 | 24.0 | RET | 71.0 | 11 | 17.0 | 17 | 23.0 | 226.0 | 155.0 |
| 21 | FRG | Daniel Diesing | Schritter; Plüg | G 251 | 15 | 21.0 | 24 | 30.0 | 10 | 16.0 | 34 | 40.0 | 24 | 30.0 | ~~RET~~ | ~~71.0~~ | 15 | 21.0 | 229.0 | 158.0 |
| 22 | ITA | S. Santoni | F. Toccoli; A. Ansaldi | I 220 | 25 | 31.0 | ~~40~~ | ~~46.0~~ | 32 | 38.0 | 15 | 21.0 | 20 | 26.0 | 10 | 16.0 | 21 | 27.0 | 205.0 | 159.0 |
| 23 | AUT | Carl Auteried Jr. | Martin Zeileis; George Zeileis | OE 90 | 35 | 41.0 | 4 | 8.0 | 45 | 51.0 | 23 | 29.0 | 18 | 24.0 | 15 | 21.0 | ~~40~~ | ~~46.0~~ | 220.0 | 169.0 |
| 24 | NOR | Kalle Nergaard | Hauff; Melson | N 87 | 24 | 30.0 | 14 | 20.0 | 25 | 31.0 | 29 | 35.0 | 23 | 29.0 | 20 | 26.0 | ~~DNC~~ | ~~71.0~~ | 242.0 | 171.0 |
| 25 | HUN | György Wossala | L. Vajtai; László Kovácsi | M 77 | 22 | 28.0 | 16 | 22.0 | 34 | 40.0 | 28 | 34.0 | 21 | 27.0 | ~~36~~ | ~~42.0~~ | 24 | 30.0 | 223.0 | 181.0 |
| 26 | HUN | György Fináczy | Tibor Izsak; Andras Toronyi | M 26 | 20 | 26.0 | 30 | 36.0 | 24 | 30.0 | 22 | 28.0 | YMP | 31.0 | 31 | 37.0 | ~~RET~~ | ~~71.0~~ | 259.0 | 188.0 |
| 27 | FRG | Schmid | Müller; Schmid | G 211 | 17 | 23.0 | 29 | 35.0 | 9 | 15.0 | 43 | 49.0 | 30 | 36.0 | ~~48~~ | ~~54.0~~ | 32 | 38.0 | 250.0 | 196.0 |
| 28 | FRG | Puppe | Winter; Schleiser | G 228 | 26 | 32.0 | ~~46~~ | ~~52.0~~ | 36 | 42.0 | 30 | 36.0 | YMP | 33.0 | 18 | 24.0 | 25 | 31.0 | 250.0 | 198.0 |
| 29 | NED | Steven Bakker | Guus de Groot; Rolf Heemskerk | H 22 | 9 | 15.0 | 9 | 15.0 | 37 | 43.0 | 26 | 32.0 | ~~DSQ~~ | ~~71.0~~ | 17 | 23.0 | DNC | 71.0 | 270.0 | 199.0 |
| 30 | SWE | Arwed von Gruenewaldt | Schibbye; Sun | S 127 | ~~54~~ | ~~60.0~~ | 26 | 32.0 | 40 | 46.0 | 31 | 37.0 | 27 | 33.0 | 24 | 30.0 | 16 | 22.0 | 260.0 | 200.0 |
| 31 | ITA | Torboli | Baldo; Camin | I 225 | 33 | 39.0 | 37 | 43.0 | 11 | 17.0 | ~~44~~ | ~~50.0~~ | 28 | 34.0 | 29 | 35.0 | 30 | 36.0 | 254.0 | 204.0 |
| 32 | DEN | Jens Ranlov | J. Hemmingsen; M. Bache | D 80 | 37 | 43.0 | 25 | 31.0 | 39 | 45.0 | 21 | 27.0 | 31 | 37.0 | 28 | 34.0 | ~~DNC~~ | ~~71.0~~ | 288.0 | 217.0 |
| 33 | ITA | Bertamini | Matteotti; Lamb | I 221 | 42 | 28.0 | 31 | 37.0 | 35 | 41.0 | 17 | 23.0 | 29 | 35.0 | ~~RET~~ | ~~71.0~~ | 35 | 41.0 | 276.0 | 205.0 |
| 34 | SUI | Heiki Blok | Andreas Keller; Haitz | Z 249 | 44 | 50.0 | 28 | 34.0 | ~~52~~ | ~~58.0~~ | 42 | 48.0 | 25 | 31.0 | 32 | 38.0 | 23 | 29.0 | 288.0 | 230.0 |
| 35 | FIN | Heikki Hohtari | J. Majander; Kukkavu | L 41 | 50 | 56.0 | ~~58~~ | ~~64.0~~ | 49 | 55.0 | 38 | 44.0 | 17 | 23.0 | 6 | 11.7 | 37 | 43.0 | 296.7 | 232.7 |
| 36 | USA | Stuart H. Walker | Stöllinger; Forster | US 725 | 40 | 46.0 | 44 | 50.0 | 53 | 59.0 | 33 | 39.0 | ~~RET~~ | ~~71.0~~ | 23 | 29.0 | 10 | 16.0 | 310.0 | 239.0 |
| 37 | FRG | Hans Heitmann | Martin Heitmann; Mathias Heitmann | G 215 | 41 | 47.0 | ~~43~~ | ~~49.0~~ | 30 | 36.0 | 40 | 46.0 | 22 | 28.0 | 37 | 43.0 | 33 | 39.0 | 288.0 | 239.0 |
| 38 | ITA | Modena | Bernardi; Zeuch | I 212 | ~~PMS~~ | ~~71.0~~ | 32 | 38.0 | 54 | 60.0 | 25 | 31.0 | 33 | 39.0 | 43 | 49.0 | 22 | 28.0 | 316.0 | 245.0 |
| 39 | FRG | Andy Vincon | Doersch; Vincon | G 240 | ~~PMS~~ | ~~71.0~~ | 27 | 33.0 | 33 | 39.0 | 41 | 47.0 | 26 | 32.0 | 52 | 58.0 | 31 | 37.0 | 317.0 | 246.0 |
| 40 | ITA | Rossi | Sgorbati; Abrami | I 188 | 38 | 44.0 | 33 | 39.0 | 13 | 19.0 | ~~RET~~ | ~~71.0~~ | 43 | 49.0 | 30 | 36.0 | DNC | 71.0 | 329.0 | 258.0 |
| 41 | AUT | Kloiber | Brandstätter; Not documented | OE 80 | 36 | 42.0 | 45 | 51.0 | 31 | 37.0 | 39 | 45.0 | 34 | 40.0 | 38 | 44.0 | ~~DNC~~ | ~~71.0~~ | 330.0 | 259.0 |
| 42 | FRG | Gärsch | Müller; Schulz | G 213 | 31 | 37.0 | ~~51~~ | ~~57.0~~ | 41 | 47.0 | 32 | 38.0 | 42 | 48.0 | 44 | 50.0 | 34 | 40.0 | 317.0 | 260.0 |
| 43 | FRG | Blombach | Merlevede; Weber | G 241 | 29 | 35.0 | 41 | 47.0 | 27 | 33.0 | ~~52~~ | ~~58.0~~ | 41 | 47.0 | 41 | 47.0 | 36 | 42.0 | 309.0 | 251.0 |
| 44 | AUT | Uli Strohschneider | Hannes Blaschke; Andreas Blaschke | OE 78 | 34 | 40.0 | 34 | 40.0 | 56 | 62.0 | ~~RET~~ | ~~71.0~~ | YMP | 44.0 | 34 | 40.0 | 29 | 35.0 | 332.0 | 261.0 |
| 45 | ITA | Marzari | Infanti; Bertolin | I 198 | 39 | 45.0 | 48 | 54.0 | ~~57~~ | ~~63.0~~ | 35 | 41.0 | 40 | 46.0 | 40 | 46.0 | 27 | 33.0 | 328.0 | 265.0 |
| 46 | SUI | Jorg Menzi | Christen; Fumasoli | Z 250 | 27 | 33.0 | 39 | 45.0 | ~~46~~ | ~~52.0~~ | 49 | 55.0 | 37 | 43.0 | 42 | 48.0 | 38 | 44.0 | 320.0 | 265.0 |
| 47 | FRG | Huber | Rocholl; Keinath | G 236 | ~~48~~ | ~~54.0~~ | 36 | 42.0 | 21 | 27.0 | 45 | 51.0 | 39 | 45.0 | 46 | 52.0 | 44 | 50.0 | 321.0 | 267.0 |
| 48 | FRG | Rudolf Persike | Mathias Dulce; Riccius | G 199 | 45 | 51.0 | 23 | 29.0 | 60 | 66.0 | 36 | 42.0 | ~~DSQ~~ | ~~71.0~~ | 35 | 41.0 | 48 | 54.0 | 354.0 | 283.0 |
| 49 | ITA | Chemolli | Girolamo; Di Giro | I 199 | 49 | 55.0 | 55 | 61.0 | 38 | 44.0 | 37 | 43.0 | 36 | 42.0 | 33 | 39.0 | ~~DNC~~ | ~~71.0~~ | 355.0 | 284.0 |
| 50 | FRG | Jakob | Jakob; Zipf | G 220 | 21 | 27.0 | 42 | 48.0 | 43 | 49.0 | ~~RET~~ | ~~71.0~~ | 38 | 44.0 | 45 | 51.0 | DNC | 71.0 | 361.0 | 290.0 |
| 51 | USA | Roll | Bergstrom; Cinquegra | US 724 | 28 | 34.0 | 53 | 59.0 | 47 | 53.0 | 48 | 54.0 | ~~RET~~ | ~~71.0~~ | 39 | 45.0 | 41 | 47.0 | 363.0 | 292.0 |
| 52 | ITA | Veronesi | Vangelista; Pirl | I 187 | 46 | 52.0 | 49 | 55.0 | 12 | 18.0 | ~~RET~~ | ~~71.0~~ | RET | 71.0 | 47 | 53.0 | 42 | 48.0 | 368.0 | 297.0 |
| 53 | FRG | Achim Kadelbach | Pochammer; Wall | G 224 | 5 | 10.0 | 56 | 62.0 | 19 | 25.0 | 47 | 53.0 | 45 | 51.0 | 55 | 61.0 | ~~DNC~~ | ~~71.0~~ | 333.0 | 262.0 |
| 54 | ITA | Rosa | Guidotti; Viti | I 195 | 23 | 29.0 | 35 | 41.0 | 42 | 48.0 | 46 | 52.0 | ~~RET~~ | ~~71.0~~ | RET | 71.0 | DNC | 71.0 | 383.0 | 312.0 |
| 55 | FRG | Sauer | Wolf; Hausch | G 189 | ~~55~~ | ~~61.0~~ | 38 | 44.0 | 48 | 54.0 | 50 | 56.0 | 46 | 52.0 | 53 | 59.0 | 45 | 51.0 | 377.0 | 316.0 |
| 56 | ITA | Terzi | Terzi; Manenti | I 214 | 56 | 62.0 | ~~DSQ~~ | ~~71.0~~ | 44 | 50.0 | 27 | 33.0 | 35 | 41.0 | PMS | 71.0 | DNC | 71.0 | 399.0 | 328.0 |
| 57 | SUI | Ami Blanc | Jean-Pierre Marmier; Jacot | Z 234 | 43 | 49.0 | 52 | 58.0 | 51 | 57.0 | 53 | 59.0 | 44 | 50.0 | 50 | 56.0 | ~~DNC~~ | ~~71.0~~ | 400.0 | 329.0 |
| 58 | FRA | Olivaux | Bougard; Boursier | F 138 | ~~58~~ | ~~64.0~~ | 47 | 53.0 | 55 | 61.0 | 54 | 60.0 | 47 | 53.0 | 49 | 55.0 | 47 | 53.0 | 399.0 | 335.0 |
| 59 | ITA | Rolli | Lo Masto; Fulvio | I 207 | 52 | 58.0 | ~~RET~~ | ~~71.0~~ | 61 | 67.0 | 51 | 57.0 | 48 | 54.0 | 51 | 57.0 | 43 | 49.0 | 413.0 | 342.0 |
| 60 | FRA | De Pimodan | Fonteneau; Not documented | F 139 | 47 | 53.0 | 50 | 56.0 | 59 | 65.0 | ~~RET~~ | ~~71.0~~ | 50 | 56.0 | DSQ | 71.0 | 36 | 42.0 | 414.0 | 343.0 |
| 61 | LIE | Seemann | Seemann; Schoenbu | FL 1 | 53 | 59.0 | ~~57~~ | ~~63.0~~ | 58 | 64.0 | 56 | 62.0 | 51 | 57.0 | 54 | 60.0 | 49 | 55.0 | 420.0 | 356.0 |
| 62 | NED | Ton Koot | Job Westening; Ton Donker | H 20 | 57 | 63.0 | ~~RET~~ | ~~71.0~~ | 50 | 56.0 | 55 | 61.0 | 49 | 55.0 | 56 | 62.0 | DNC | 71.0 | 439.0 | 368.0 |
| 63 | FRA | Yves Steff | Gaden; Steff | F 126 | ~~PMS~~ | ~~71.0~~ | 54 | 60.0 | DSQ | 71.0 | RET | 71.0 | RET | 71.0 | 57 | 63.0 | 50 | 56.0 | 463.0 | 392.0 |
| 64 | ITA | Marino | Cristaldini; Turaz | I 209 | 32 | 38.0 | ~~RET~~ | ~~71.0~~ | DNC | 71.0 | DNC | 71.0 | DNC | 71.0 | DNC | 71.0 | DNC | 71.0 | 464.0 | 393.0 |

Legend: DNF – Did not finish; DNS – Did not start; DSQ – Disqualified;
Discard is crossed out and does not count for the overall result.

- 1984 Progress

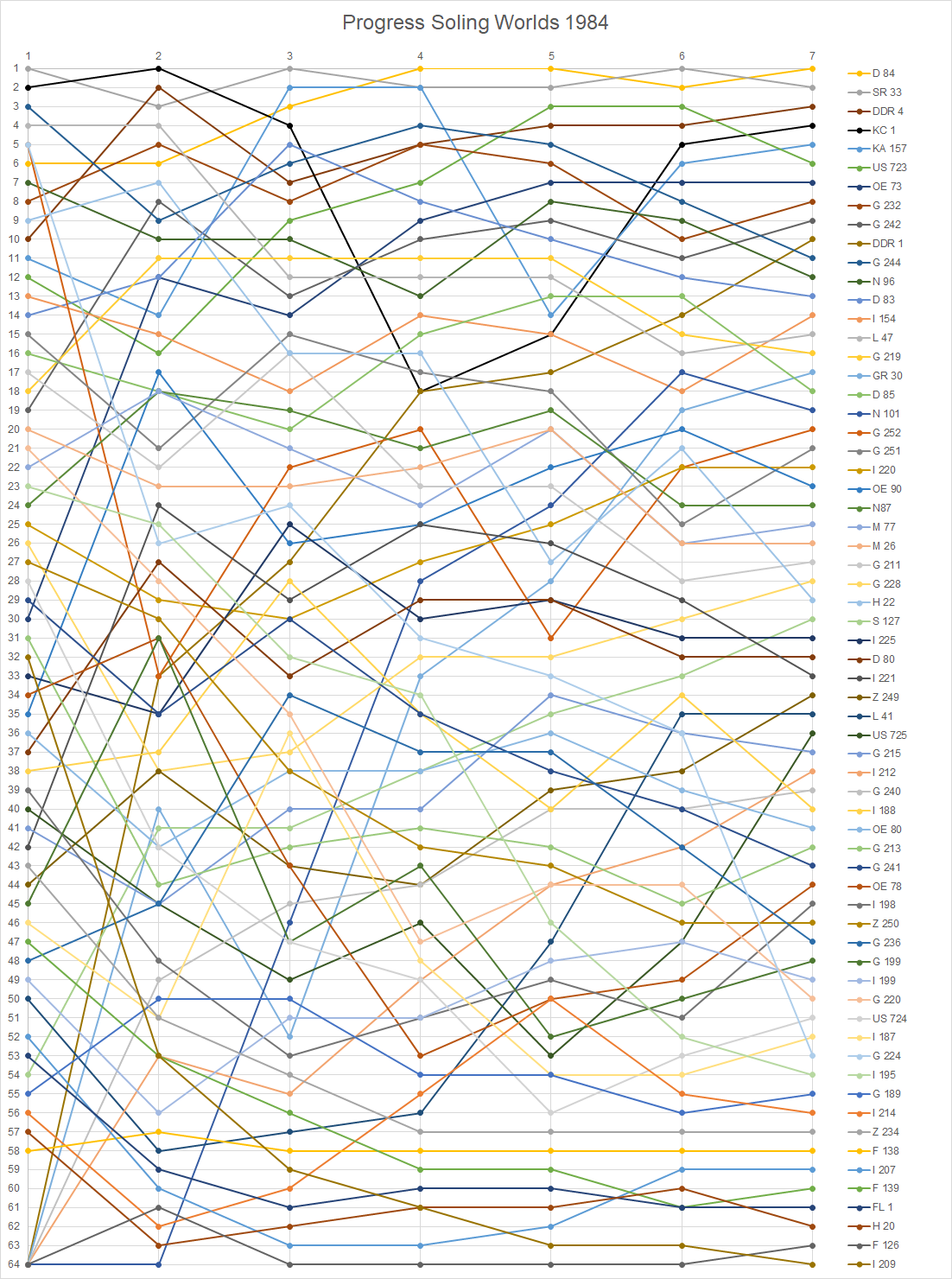

== Further results ==
For further results see:

- Soling World Championship results (1969–1979)
- Soling World Championship results (1980–1984)
- Soling World Championship results (1985–1989)
- Soling World Championship results (1990–1994)
- Soling World Championship results (1995–1999)
- Soling World Championship results (2000–2009)
- Soling World Championship results (2010–2019)
- Soling World Championship results (2020–2029)
