= Sailing at the 1984 Summer Olympics – Soling =

Soling at the Games of the XXIII Olympiad
- Soling
- Venue: Long Beach
- Dates: 31 July to 8 August
- Competitors: 66 from 22 nations
- Teams: 22

Medalists
1st place, gold medalist(s)		Robert Haines Jr. Edward Trevelyan; Roderick Davis	United States
2nd place, silver medalist(s)		Torben Grael; Daniel Adler; Ronaldo Senfft	Brazil
3rd place, bronze medalist(s)		Hans Fogh; John Kerr; Steve Calder	Canada

The Soling was a sailing event on the Sailing at the 1984 Summer Olympics program in Long Beach, Los Angeles County, California. Seven races were scheduled. 66 sailors, on 22 boats, from 22 nations competed.

== Results ==
Rank	Helmsman (Country)	Crew	Race I		Race II		Race III		Race IV		Race V		Race VI		Race VII		Total Points	Total -1
Rank	Helmsman (Country)	Crew	Rank	Points	Rank	Points	Rank	Points	Rank	Points	Rank	Points	Rank	Points	Rank	Points	Total Points	Total -1
1st place, gold medalist(s)	Robbie Haines (USA)	Rod Davis; Edward Trevelyan	1	0.0	9	15.0	3	5.7	5	10.0	1	0.0	2	3.0	~~DNS~~	~~29.0~~	62.7	33.7
2nd place, silver medalist(s)	Torben Grael (BRA)	Daniel Adler; Ronaldo Senfft	3	5.7	7	13.0	2	3.0	~~10~~	~~16.0~~	10	16.0	1	0.0	3	5.7	59.4	43.4
3rd place, bronze medalist(s)	Hans Fogh (CAN)	Steve Calder; John Kerr	4	8.0	6	11.7	1	0.0	~~8~~	~~14.0~~	5	10.0	5	10.0	5	10.0	63.7	49.7
4	Chris Law (GBR)	Edward Leask; Jeremy Richards	2	3.0	8	14.0	~~13~~	~~19.0~~	2	3.0	YMP	16.0	3	5.7	7	13.0	73.7	54.7
5	Dag Usterud (NOR)	Børre Skui; Stein Lund Halvorsen	11	17.0	1	0.0	8	14.0	4	8.0	3	5.7	7	13.0	~~DSQ~~	~~29.0~~	86.7	57.7
6	Tassos Boudouris (GRE)	Dimitrios Deligiannis; Georgios Spyridis	8	14.5	5	10.0	4	8.0	1	0.0	6	11.7	~~DNF~~	~~29.0~~	9	15.0	88.2	59.2
7	Gary Sheard (AUS)	Tim Dorning; Dean Gordon	5	10.0	3	5.7	5	10.0	~~15~~	~~21.0~~	4	8.0	11	17.0	6	11.7	83.4	62.4
8	Willy Kuhweide (FRG)	Axel May; Eckhard Löll	10	16.0	4	8.0	9	15.0	9	15.0	~~15~~	~~21.0~~	8	14.0	2	3.0	92.0	71.0
9	Gianluca Lamaro (ITA)	Valerio Romano; Aurelio Dalla Vecchia	6	11.7	2	3.0	10	16.0	7	13.0	9	15.0	9	15.0	~~12~~	~~18.0~~	91.7	73.7
10	Magnus Grävare (SWE)	Martin Grävare; Eric Wallin	7	13.0	10	16.0	11	17.0	~~YMP~~	~~20.0~~	2	3.0	4	8.0	11	17.0	94.0	74.0
11	Tom Dodson (NZL)	Simon Daubney; Aran Hansen	~~RET~~	~~29.0~~	12	18.0	17	23.0	11	17.0	13	19.0	6	11.7	1	0.0	117.7	88.7
12	Jesper Bank (DEN)	Thomas Andersen; Jan Mathiasen	8	14.5	~~13~~	~~19.0~~	7	13.0	12	18.0	7	13.0	12	18.0	10	16.0	111.5	92.5
13	Pedro Ferrero (ARG)	Carlos Sanguinetti; Alberto Llorens	15	21.0	15	21.0	12	18.0	3	5.7	14	20.0	~~17~~	~~23.0~~	4	8.0	116.7	93.7
14	Patrick Haegeli (FRA)	Michel Audoin; Philippe Massu	~~RET~~	~~29.0~~	14	20.0	16	22.0	6	11.7	8	14.0	DSQ	29.0	8	14.0	139.7	110.7
15	Michael Farthofer (AUT)	Christian Holler; Richard Holler	12	18.0	11	17.0	14	20.0	14	20.0	11	17.0	~~RET~~	~~29.0~~	15	21.0	142.0	113.0
16	Bernd Knuppel (URU)	Alejandro Ferreiro; Enrique Dupont	16	22.0	16	22.0	6	11.7	13	19.0	~~17~~	~~23.0~~	13	19.0	17	23.0	139.7	116.7
17	Takaharu Hirozawa (JPN)	Minoru Okita; Takumi Fujiwara	14	20.0	~~18~~	~~24.0~~	21	27.0	16	22.0	16	22.0	10	16.0	14	20.0	151.0	124.0
18	Louis Herman (CHI)	Jorge Zvazola; Manuel Gonzalez	13	19.0	17	23.0	15	21.0	20	26.0	~~19~~	~~25.0~~	15	21.0	13	19.0	154.0	128.0
19	Eric Tulla (PUR)	Jerry Pignolet; Ronnie Ramos	~~DNF~~	~~29.0~~	19	25.0	19	25.0	21	27.0	20	26.0	14	20.0	16	22.0	174.0	145.0
20	Khalid Akhtar (PAK)	Adnan Yousoof; Naseem Khan	18	24.0	21	27.0	18	24.0	~~19~~	~~25.0~~	18	24.0	18	24.0	18	24.0	172.0	145.0
21	Robin Tattersall (IVB)	Keith Thomas; Elvet Meyers	17	23.0	~~20~~	~~26.0~~	20	26.0	18	24.0	21	27.0	16	22.0	19	25.0	173.0	146.0
22	Jean Braure (ISV)	Kirk Grybowski; Marlon Singh	19	25.0	~~22~~	~~28.0~~	22	28.0	22	28.0	22	28.0	19	25.0	20	26.0	188.0	160.0

DNF = Did Not Finish, DNS= Did Not Start, DSQ = Disqualified, PMS = Premature Start, YMP = Yacht Materially Prejudiced
= Male, = Female

=== Daily standings ===
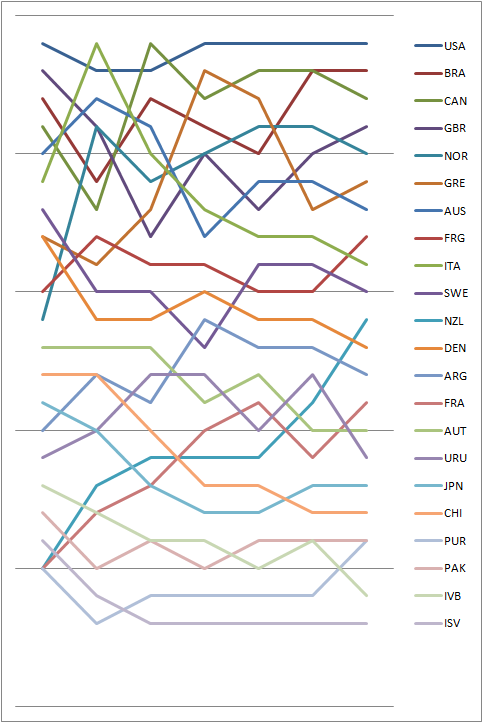
Graph showing the daily standings in the Soling during the 1984 Summer Olympics

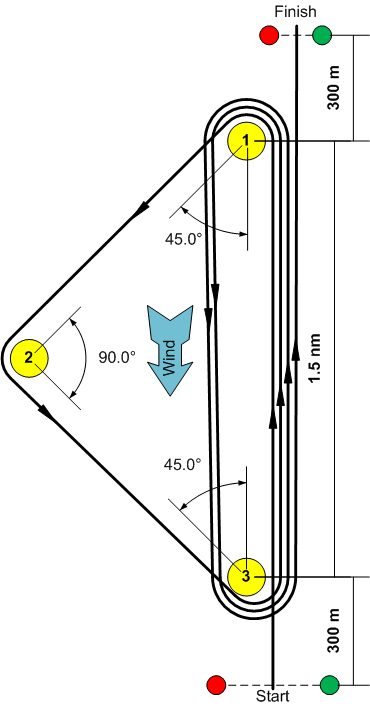
Soling Course Map
