= Robin Tattersall =

British Virgin Islands sailor (born 1930)

Robin Erskine Tattersall OBE (born 21 July 1930) is a British doctor, model and sailor who competed in the Summer Olympics for the British Virgin Islands.

== Biography ==
Tattersall was born in Manchester, United Kingdom. In the 1950s, while training to be a doctor at St George's Hospital in Hyde Park, Tattersall modelled for Richard Avedon alongside Suzy Parker.

Tattersall competed at two Summer Olympics. At the 1984 Summer Olympics he was helmsman in the Soling Class with Keith Thomas and Elvet Meyers. Out of 22 crews the team finished 21st. Eight years later at Barcelona he competed in the Soling Class again, this time with Robert Hirst and John Shirley. They finished 17th out of 24. At 62 years and 7 days, he was the oldest competitor of the sailing events.

In recognition for his public service as a doctor in the British Virgin Islands, he was awarded an OBE in the 2001 New Year Honours.
