= Michele Lamaro =

Italy international rugby union player

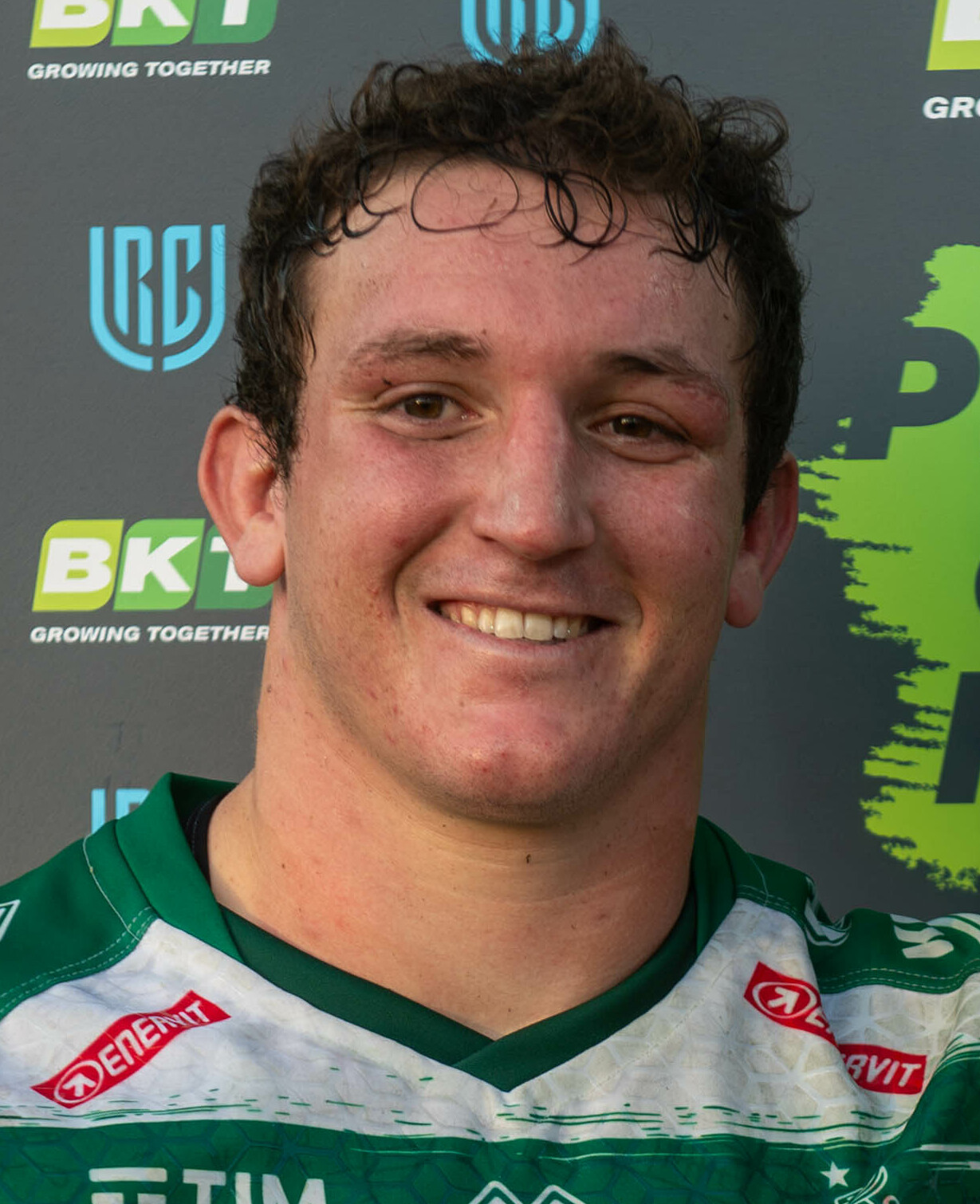
- Lamaro in 2023
- Born: 3 June 1998 (age 28) Rome, Italy
- Height: 1.86 m (6 ft 1 in)
- Weight: 102 kg (225 lb; 16 st 1 lb)
- Notable relative: Gianluca Lamaro (father)

Rugby union career
- Position(s): Flanker, Number 8
- Current team: Benetton
Senior career
| Years | Team | Apps | (Points) |
| 2015−2016 | Primavera | 15 | (15) |
| 2016–2017 | Lazio | 14 | (15) |
| 2017–2019 | Petrarca | 20 | (10) |
| 2018−2019 | →Benetton | 8 | (5) |
| 2019− | Benetton | 88 | (30) |
- Correct as of 30 Aug 2026
International career
| Years | Team | Apps | (Points) |
| 2017–2018 | Italy U20 | 17 | (10) |
| 2020– | Italy | 57 | (15) |
- Correct as of 18 Jul 2026

Michele Lamaro (born 3 June 1998) is an Italian professional rugby union player who plays as a flanker for United Rugby Championship club Benetton and captains the Italy national team.

At international level, Lamaro made his test debut against France during the Autumn Nations Cup. He has previously played for clubs such as Primavera, Lazio, and Petrarca in the past.

== Personal life ==
Gianluca, Lamaro's father, competed for Italy in sailing at the Olympic Games in 1984 and 1988. He was raised ten minutes from Stadio Olimpico and is a native of Rome. Lamaro played for Primavera in his brother's footsteps before gaining a transfer to Lazio and later Petrarca.

== Club career ==
For 2018–19 Pro14 season, Lamaro was named Permit Player for Benetton in Pro 14. He was injured on 9 February 2019 and took almost a year to recover. In February 2020 he returned to help defeat Cardiff.

As of the end of the 2022 season, Lamaro is captain of Benetton Rugby.

== International career ==
From 2016 to 2018, Lamaro was named in the Italy Under 20 squad and from November 2020 he was named in the Italy squad.

On 25 October 2021, Lamaro was named Captain of Italy squad for 2021 end-of-year rugby union internationals in substitution of Luca Bigi.

In 2022, Lamaro captained Italy to their first win in 36 games in the Six Nations, with a win over Wales in the final round of the 2022 Six Nations Championship.

On 22 August 2023, he was named in the Italy's 33-man squad for the 2023 Rugby World Cup.

During the 2024 Six Nations Championship, he set a new record for the most tackles by a player in a championship campaign with 103, surpassing the previous tally set by Jonny Gray in 2018 with 100.
