= Sailing at the 1988 Summer Olympics – Soling =

Soling at the Games of the XXIV Olympiad
- Soling
- Venue: Busan 부산 釜山
- Dates: 20–27 September
- Competitors: 63 from 20 nations
- Teams: 20

Medalists
| 1st place, gold medalist(s) | | Jochen Schümann; Thomas Flach; Bernd Jäkel | East Germany |
| 2nd place, silver medalist(s) | | John Kostecki; William Baylis; Robert Billingham | United States |
| 3rd place, bronze medalist(s) | | Jesper Bank; Jan Mathiasen; Steen Secher | Denmark |

The Soling was a sailing event on the Sailing at the 1988 Summer Olympics program in Pusan, South Korea. Seven races were scheduled. 63 sailors, on 20 boats, from 20 nations competed.

== Results ==
| Rank | Helmsman (Country) | Crew | Race I | | Race II | | Race III | | Race IV | | Race V | | Race VI | | Race VII | | Total Points | Total -1 |
| Rank | Helmsman (Country) | Crew | Rank | Points | Rank | Points | Rank | Points | Rank | Points | Rank | Points | Rank | Points | Rank | Points | Total Points | Total -1 |
|---|---|---|---|---|---|---|---|---|---|---|---|---|---|---|---|---|---|---|
| 1st place, gold medalist(s) | Jochen Schümann (GDR) | Thomas Flach; Bernd Jäkel | 1 | 0.0 | 3 | 5.7 | 2 | 3.0 | 6 | 11.7 | 1 | 0.0 | 1 | 0.0 | 2 | 3.0 | 23.4 | 11.7 |
| 2nd place, silver medalist(s) | John Kostecki (USA) | William Baylis; Robert Billingham | 2 | 3.0 | 1 | 0.0 | 4 | 8.0 | 1 | 0.0 | 2 | 3.0 | 5 | 10.0 | 1 | 0.0 | 24.0 | 14.0 |
| 3rd place, bronze medalist(s) | Jesper Bank (DEN) | Jan Mathiasen; Steen Secher | 9 | 15.0 | 2 | 3.0 | 12 | 18.0 | 15 | 21.0 | 4 | 8.0 | 2 | 3.0 | 3 | 5.7 | 73.7 | 52.7 |
| 4 | Lawrie Smith (GBR) | Edward Leask; Jeremy Richards | 6 | 11.7 | 8 | 14.0 | 6 | 11.7 | 3 | 5.7 | 5 | 10.0 | 8 | 14.0 | RET | 27.0 | 94.1 | 67.1 |
| 5 | Jose Paulo Dias (BRA) | Jose Augusto Dias; Daniel Adler Race 1 - 5 Christoph Bergman Race 6 & 7 | 3 | 5.7 | 6 | 11.7 | DSQ | 27.0 | 5 | 10.0 | 11 | 17.0 | 9 | 15.0 | 4 | 8.0 | 94.4 | 67.4 |
| 6 | Michel Kermarec (FRA) | Stanislas Dripaux; Xavier Phelipon | 19 | 25.0 | 4 | 8.0 | 5 | 10.0 | 11 | 17.0 | 6 | 11.7 | 6 | 11.7 | 5 | 10.0 | 93.4 | 68.4 |
| 7 | Tom Dodson (NZL) | Simon Daubney; Aran Hansen | 4 | 8.0 | 9 | 15.0 | 7 | 13.0 | 16 | 22.0 | 3 | 5.7 | 15 | 21.0 | 6 | 11.7 | 96.4 | 74.4 |
| 8 | Lennart Persson (SWE) | Eje Öberg; Tony Wallin | 7 | 13.0 | 10 | 16.0 | 3 | 5.7 | 4 | 8.0 | RET | 27.0 | 12 | 18.0 | 11 | 17.0 | 104.7 | 77.7 |
| 9 | Santiago Lange (ARG) | Pedro Ferrero; Raúl Lena | 15 | 21.0 | 13 | 19.0 | 1 | 0.0 | 8 | 14.0 | 8 | 14.0 | 11 | 17.0 | 12 | 18.0 | 103.0 | 82.0 |
| 10 | Georgy Shayduko (URS) | Oleg Miron; Nikolay Polyakov | 13 | 19.0 | 11 | 17.0 | 11 | 17.0 | 10 | 16.0 | 7 | 13.0 | 4 | 8.0 | 7 | 13.0 | 103.0 | 84.0 |
| 11 | Kazunori Komatsu (JPN) | Kazuo Hanaoka; Tadashi Ikeda | 11 | 17.0 | 17 | 23.0 | 8 | 14.0 | 7 | 13.0 | 10 | 16.0 | 3 | 5.7 | 13 | 19.0 | 107.7 | 84.7 |
| 12 | Paul Thomson (CAN) | Stuart Flinn; Philip Gow | 8 | 14.0 | 12 | 18.0 | 13 | 19.0 | 2 | 3.0 | RET | 27.0 | 13 | 19.0 | 10 | 16.0 | 116.0 | 89.0 |
| 13 | Gianluca Lamaro (ITA) | Aurelio Dalla Vecchia; Valerio Romano | 5 | 10.0 | 7 | 13.0 | 14 | 20.0 | 17 | 23.0 | RET | 27.0 | 10 | 16.0 | 9 | 15.0 | 124.0 | 97.0 |
| 14 | Bob Wilmot (AUS) | Glenn Read; Matthew Percy | 10 | 16.0 | 5 | 10.0 | 15 | 21.0 | 13 | 19.0 | 12 | 18.0 | 16 | 22.0 | 8 | 14.0 | 120.0 | 98.0 |
| 15 | Jens-Peter Wrede (FRG) | Matthias Adamczewski; Stefan Knabe | 12 | 18.0 | 18 | 24.0 | 10 | 16.0 | 14 | 20.0 | 9 | 15.0 | 7 | 13.0 | 14 | 20.0 | 126.0 | 102.0 |
| 16 | Horacio Carabelli (URU) | Héber Ansorena; Luis Chiapparro | 17 | 23.0 | 15 | 21.0 | 16 | 22.0 | 9 | 15.0 | 14 | 20.0 | 19 | 25.0 | 15 | 21.0 | 147.0 | 122.0 |
| 17 | Antonio Gorostegui (ESP) | Jaime Monjo; José Manuel Valades Race 1 Domingo Manrique Race 2 - 7 | 16 | 22.0 | 16 | 22.0 | 18 | 24.0 | 12 | 18.0 | 13 | 19.0 | 17 | 23.0 | RET | 27.0 | 155.0 | 128.0 |
| 18 | Tassos Boudouris (GRE) | Dimitrios Deligiannis; Antonios Bountouris Race 1 - 3 Georgios Prekas Race 4 - 7 | 14 | 20.0 | RET | 27.0 | 9 | 15.0 | 18 | 24.0 | DSQ | 27.0 | 14 | 20.0 | RET | 27.0 | 160.0 | 133.0 |
| 19 | David Ashby (FIJ) | Colin Dunlop; Colin Philp, Sr. | 20 | 26.0 | 19 | 25.0 | 17 | 23.0 | 20 | 26.0 | 15 | 21.0 | 20 | 26.0 | 16 | 22.0 | 169.0 | 143.0 |
| 20 | Germán Schacht (CHI) | Rodrigo Zvazola; Manuel Gonzalez | 18 | 24.0 | 14 | 20.0 | 19 | 25.0 | 19 | 25.0 | RET | 27.0 | 18 | 24.0 | RET | 27.0 | 172.0 | 145.0 |

DNF = Did Not Finish, DSQ = Disqualified, PMS = Premature Start
Crossed out results did not count for the total result.
= Male, = Female

=== Daily standings ===
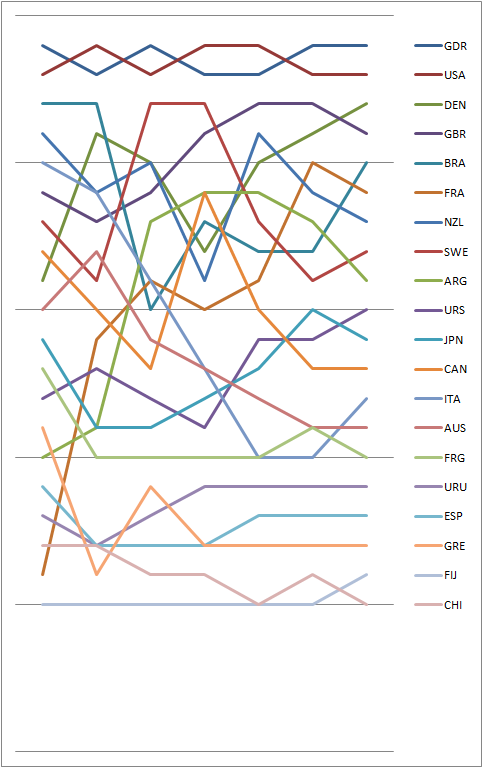
Graph showing the daily standings in the Soling during the 1988 Summer Olympics
