= Takumi Fujiwara (disambiguation) =

Takumi Fujiwara (born 1962) is a Japanese sailor.

Takumi Fujiwara may also refer to:

- Takumi Fujiwara, a fictional character in the manga and anime series Dear Boys
- Takumi Fujiwara, the main protagonist of the manga series Initial D
