= Naseem Khan =

Naseem Khan may refer to:

- Naseem Khan (activist) (1939–2017), British activist
- Naseem Khan (politician) (born 1963), Indian politician
- Naseem Khan (sailor) (born 1958), Pakistani sailor
