= Thomas Andersen =

Thomas Andersen may refer to:

- Thomas Andersen (sailor), Danish sailor
- Thomas Winther Andersen, Norwegian-born jazz bassist
- Thomas Herman Andersen, commissioner of police for the state of Western Australia
- Thom Andersen, American filmmaker, film critic, and teacher
- Tom Andersen, member of the Oregon House of Representatives

== See also ==
- Thomas Anderson (disambiguation)
