= Takaharu Hirozawa =

Japanese sailor

Personal information
- Nationality: Japan
- Born: 16 October 1946 (age 79)
- Height: 1.70 m (5.6 ft)

Sport

Sailing career
- Class: Soling
- Updated on 27 February 2020

Takaharu Hirozawa (born 16 October 1946) is a sailor from Japan, who represented his country at the 1984 Summer Olympics in Los Angeles, United States as helmsman in the Soling. With crew members Minoru Okita and Takumi Fujiwara they took 17th place. He also competed at the 1976 Summer Olympics.
