= Stanislas Dripaux =

Olympic sailor from France

Personal information
- Nationality: France
- Born: 3 August 1962 (age 63) Épinal
- Height: 1.90 m (6.2 ft)

Sport

Sailing career
- Class: Soling
- Updated on 27 February 2020

Stanislas Dripaux (born 3 August 1962) is a sailor from Épinal, France. who represented his country at the 1988 Summer Olympics in Busan, South Korea as crew member in the Soling. With helmsman Michel Kermarec and fellow crew members Xavier Phelipon they took the 6th place.
