= Eric Wallin =

Olympic sailor from Sweden

Personal information
- Nationality: Sweden
- Born: 10 December 1960 (age 65) Gothenburg
- Height: 1.87 m (6.1 ft)

Sport

Sailing career
- Class: Soling
- Club: Royal Gothenburg Yacht Club
- Updated on 27 February 2020

Eric Wallin (born 10 December 1960) is a sailor from Gothenburg, Sweden, who represented his country at the 1984 Summer Olympics in Los Angeles, United States as crew member in the Soling. With helmsman Magnus Grävare and fellow crew member Martin Grävare they took the 10th place.
