= Jorge Zuazola =

Olympic sailor from Chile

Personal information
- Nationality: Chile
- Born: 20 December 1955 (age 70)

Sport

Sailing career
- Class: Soling

Jorge Zuazola (born 20 December 1955) is a sailor from Chile, who represented his country at the 1984 Summer Olympics in Los Angeles, United States as crew member in the Soling. With helmsman Louis Herman and fellow crew member Manuel Gonzalez they took the 16th place.
