= Edward Leask =

Olympic sailor from the UK

Personal information
- Full name: Edward P. S. Leask
- Nationality: United Kingdom
- Born: 18 May 1947 (age 79) Portsmouth
- Height: 1.98 m (6.5 ft)

Sailing career
- Sport: Sailing
- Club: Royal Albert Yacht Club, Royal Naval Club
- Class: Soling
- Updated on 27 February 2020

Edward Leasks (born 18 May 1947) is a sailor from Portsmouth, Great Britain, who represented his country at the 1984 Summer Olympics in Los Angeles, United States as crew member in the Soling. With helmsman Chris Law and fellow crew member Jeremy Richards they took the 4th place. Edward took also part in the 1988 Summer Olympics in Busan, South Korea. With helmsman Lawrie Smith and again with fellow crew member Jeremy Richards they took the also 4th place.
