= Thomas Andersen (sailor) =

Olympic sailor from Denmark

Personal information
- Full name: Thomas Wilkens Andersen
- Nationality: Denmark
- Born: 10 April 1961 (age 65) Fredericia
- Height: 1.79 m (5.9 ft)

Sailing career
- Sport: Sailing
- Club: Fredericia Sejlklub
- Class: Soling
- Updated on 27 February 2020

Thomas Andersen (born 10 April 1961) is a sailor from Fredericia, Denmark, who represented his country at the 1984 Summer Olympics in Los Angeles, United States as crew member in the Soling. With helmsman Jesper Bank and fellow crew member Jan Mathiasen they took the 12th place.
