= Enrique Dupont =

Uruguayan sport sailor (born 1958)

Personal information
- Nationality: Uruguay
- Born: 23 August 1958 (age 67)
- Height: 1.89 m (6.2 ft)

Sport

Sailing career
- Class: Soling
- Updated on 27 February 2020

Enrique Dupont (born 23 August 1958) is a sailor from Uruguay, who represented his country at the 1984 Summer Olympics in Los Angeles, United States as crew member in the Soling. With helmsman Bernd Knuppel and fellow crew member Alejandro Ferreiro they took the 16th place.
