= Marlon Singh =

Sailor from United States Virgin Islands

Personal information
- Nationality: United States Virgin Islands
- Born: 11 June 1963 (age 63)
- Height: 1.85 m (6.1 ft)

Sailing career
- Sport: Sailing
- Class: Soling
- Updated on 27 February 2020

Marlon Singh (born 11 June 1963) is a sailor from the United States Virgin Islands, who represented his country at the 1984 Summer Olympics in Los Angeles, United States as crew member in the Soling. With helmsman Jean Braure and fellow crew member Kirk Grybowski they took the 22nd place.
