= Minoru Okita =

Olympic sailor from Japan

Personal information
- Nationality: Japan
- Born: 1 July 1951 (age 74)
- Height: 1.73 m (5.7 ft)

Sport

Sailing career
- Class: Soling
- Updated on 27 February 2020

Minoru Okita (born 1 July 1951) is a sailor from Japan, who represented his country at the 1984 Summer Olympics in Los Angeles, United States as crew member in the Soling. With helmsman Takaharu Hirozawa and fellow crew member Takumi Fujiwara they took the 16th place.
