= Michel Audoin =

Olympic sailor from France

Personal information
- Nationality: France
- Born: 23 February 1957 (age 68)
- Height: 1.85 m (6.1 ft)

Sport

Sailing career
- Class: Soling
- Updated on 27 February 2020

Michel Audoin (born 23 February 1957) is a sailor from France, who represented his country at the 1984 Summer Olympics in Los Angeles, United States as crew member in the Soling. With helmsman Patrick Haegeli and fellow crew member Philippe Massu they took the 14th place.
