= Manuel González (sailor) =

Olympic sailor from Chile

Personal information
- Nationality: Chilean
- Born: 14 September 1957 (age 68)

Sport

Sailing career
- Class: Soling

Manuel González (born 14 September 1957) is an Olympic sailor from Chile, who represented his country at the 1984 Summer Olympics in Los Angeles. He also represented Chile at the 1988 Summer Olympics in Seoul, both times as a crew member in the Soling. With helmsman Louis Herman and fellow crew member Jorge Zuazola, they took the 18th place in 1984. With helmsman Germán Schacht and fellow crew member Rodrigo Zuazola, González took 20th place during the 1988 Summer Olympics in Busan, South Korea.
