= Germán Schacht =

Olympic sailor from Chile

Personal information
- Full name: Germán Schacht Verdugo
- Nationality: Chile
- Born: 24 October 1961 (age 64) Gironde
- Height: 1.90 m (6.2 ft)

Sport

Sailing career
- Class: Soling
- Updated on 28 February 2020

Germán Schacht Verdugo (Note: In this Spanish name, the first or paternal surname is Schacht and the second or maternal family name is Verdugo.) (born 24 October 1961) is a sailor from Chile, who represented his country at the 1988 Summer Olympics in Busan, South Korea as helmsman in the Soling. With crew members Rodrigo Zvazola and Manuel Gonzalez they took the 20th place.
