= Jeremy Richards =

Olympic sailor from the UK

Personal information
- Nationality: United Kingdom
- Born: 30 January 1956 (age 69) Empingham, Rutland
- Height: 1.80 m (5.9 ft)

Sport

Sailing career
- Class: Soling
- Club: HISC, Chichester
- Updated on 27 February 2020

Jeremy Richards (born 30 January 1956) is a sailor from Empingham, Great Britain, who represented his country at the 1984 Summer Olympics in Los Angeles, United States as crew member in the Soling. With helmsman Chris Law and fellow crew member Edward Leask they took the 4th place. Jeremy took also part in the 1988 Summer Olympics in Busan, South Korea. With helmsman Lawrie Smith and again with fellow crew member Edward Leask they took the also 4th place.
