= Adnan Yousoof =

Pakistani sailor (born 1958)

Personal information
- Nationality: Pakistan
- Born: 19 January 1968 (age 57)
- Height: 1.85 m (6.1 ft)

Sport

Sailing career
- Class: Soling
- Updated on 27 February 2020

Adnan Yousoof (born 5 July 1958), also known as Adnan Youssef, is a sailor from Pakistan, who represented his country at the 1984 Summer Olympics in Los Angeles, United States as crew member in the Soling. With helmsman Khalid Akhtar and fellow crew member Naseem Khan they took the 20th place.
