= Ronnie Ramos =

Olympic sailor from Puerto Rico

Personal information
- Nationality: Puerto Rico
- Born: 21 May 1946 (age 79)
- Height: 1.75 m (5.7 ft)

Sport

Sailing career
- Class: Soling
- Updated on 27 February 2020

Ronnie Ramos (born 21 May 1946) is a sailor from Puerto Rico, who represented his country at the 1984 Summer Olympics in Los Angeles, United States as crew member in the Soling. With helmsman Eric Tulla and fellow crew member Jerry Pignolet they took the 19th place.
