= Jerry Pignolet =

Olympic sailor from Puerto Rico

Personal information
- Nationality: Puerto Rico
- Born: 13 May 1956 (age 69)
- Height: 1.83 m (6.0 ft)

Sport

Sailing career
- Class: Soling
- Updated on 27 February 2020

Jerry Pignolet (born 13 May 1956) is a sailor from Puerto Rico, who represented his country at the 1984 Summer Olympics in Los Angeles, United States as crew member in the Soling. With helmsman Eric Tulla and fellow crew member Ronnie Ramos they took the 19th place.
