= José Manuel Valadés =

Olympic sailor from Spain

José Manuel Valades
Personal information
- Full name: José Manuel Valades Venys
- Nationality: Spain
- Born: 15 July 1953 (age 72)
- Height: 1.84 m (6.0 ft)

Sport

Sailing career
- Class: Soling
- Updated on 28 February 2020

José Manuel Valades (born 15 July 1953) is a sailor from Spain. who represented his country at the 1988 Summer Olympics in Busan, South Korea as crew member in the Soling. With helmsman Antonio Gorostegui and fellow crew members Jaime Monjo and Domingo Manrique they took the 17th place. Valades was due to illness replaced by Manrique after the first race.
