= Philippe Massu =

Olympic sailor from France

Personal information
- Full name: Philippe Bernard Georges Maurice Massu
- Nationality: France
- Born: 18 September 1952 Belle Île, France
- Died: 13 June 2013 (aged 60)
- Height: 1.85 m (6.1 ft)

Sport

Sailing career
- Class: Soling
- Updated on 27 February 2020

Philippe Bernard Georges Maurice Massu (18 September 1952 – 13 June 2013) was a sailor from Belle Île, France, who represented his country at the 1984 Summer Olympics in Los Angeles, United States as crew member in the Soling. With helmsman Patrick Haegeli and fellow crew member Michel Audoin they took the 14th place.
