= Xavier Phelipon =

Olympic sailor from France

Personal information
- Nationality: France
- Born: 26 August 1959 (age 66) Fontenay-le-Comte
- Height: 1.90 m (6.2 ft)

Sport

Sailing career
- Class: Soling
- Updated on 28 February 2020

Xavier Phelipon (born 3 August 1962) is a sailor from Fontenay-le-Comte, France. who represented his country at the 1988 Summer Olympics in Busan, South Korea as crew member in the Soling. With helmsman Michel Kermarec and fellow crew members Stanislas Dripaux they took the 6th place.
