= Alejandro Ferreiro =

Olympic sailor from Uruguay

Personal information
- Full name: Alejandro E. Ferreiro de Nava
- Nationality: Uruguay
- Born: 20 March 1961 (age 65)
- Height: 1.89 m (6.2 ft)

Sailing career
- Sport: Sailing
- Class: Soling
- Updated on 27 February 2020

Alejandro Ferreiro (born 20 March 1961) is a sailor from Uruguay, who represented his country at the 1984 Summer Olympics in Los Angeles, United States as crew member in the Soling. With helmsman Bernd Knuppel and fellow crew member Enrique Dupont they took the 16th place.
