= Kirk Grybowski =

Olympic sailor from United States Virgin Islands

Personal information
- Full name: Kirk Rient Grybowski
- Nationality: United States Virgin Islands
- Born: January 31, 1938 Santa Barbara, California, U.S.
- Died: October 8, 2002 (aged 64) Chicago, Illinois, U.S.
- Height: 1.88 m (6.2 ft)

Sport

Sailing career
- Class: Soling
- Club: St. Thomas Yacht Club
- Updated on February 27, 2020

Kirk Rient Grybowski (January 31, 1938 – October 8, 2002) was a sailor from the United States Virgin Islands, who competed in the Soling at the 1984 Summer Olympics in Los Angeles, United States. With helmsman Jean Braure and fellow crew member Marlon Singh, Grybowski finished in 22nd place.
