= Jaime Monjo =

Olympic sailor from Spain

Personal information
- Full name: Jaime Monjo Carrió
- Nationality: Spain
- Born: 3 August 1953 (age 72) Palma de Mallorca
- Height: 1.78 m (5.8 ft)

Sport

Sailing career
- Class: Soling
- Updated on 28 February 2020

Jaime Monjo (born 3 August 1953) is a sailor from Palma de Mallorca, Spain. who represented his country at the 1988 Summer Olympics in Busan, South Korea as crew member in the Soling. With helmsman Antonio Gorostegui and fellow crew members José Manuel Valades and Domingo Manrique they took the 17th place.
