= Luis Herman =

Olympic sailor from Chile

Personal information
- Nationality: Chilean
- Born: 10 October 1952 (age 73)

Sport

Sailing career
- Class: Soling
- Updated on 27 February 2020

Luis Herman (born 10 October 1952) is a sailor from Chile, who represented his country at the 1984 Summer Olympics in Los Angeles, United States as helmsman in the Soling. With crew members Jorge Zuazola and Manuel Gonzalez they took the 18th place.
