= Martin Grävare =

Olympic sailor from Sweden

Personal information
- Nationality: Sweden
- Born: 29 August 1959 (age 66) Gothenburg
- Height: 1.80 m (5.9 ft)

Sport

Sailing career
- Class: Soling
- Club: Royal Gothenburg Yacht Club
- Updated on 27 February 2020

Martin Grävare (born 29 August 1959) is a sailor from Gothenburg, Sweden, who represented his country at the 1984 Summer Olympics in Los Angeles, United States as crew member in the Soling. With helmsman Magnus Grävare and fellow crew member Eric Wallin they took the 10th place.
