= Rodrigo Zuazola =

Olympic sailor from Chile

Personal information
- Nationality: Chile
- Born: 9 March 1957 (age 68) Chile
- Height: 1.83 m (6.0 ft)

Sport

Sailing career
- Class: Soling
- Updated on 28 February 2020

Rodrigo Zuazola (born: 9 March 1957) is a sailor from Chile. who represented his country at the 1988 Summer Olympics in Busan, South Korea as crew member in the Soling. With helmsman Germán Schacht and fellow crew members Manuel Gonzalez they took the 20th place.
