= Georgios Prekas =

Olympic sailor from Greece

Personal information
- Native name: Γεώργιος Πρεκας
- Nationality: Greece
- Born: 1950 (age 74–75)

Sport

Sailing career
- Class: Soling
- Updated on 28 February 2020

Antonios Bountouris (born 1950) is a sailor from Greece. who represented his country at the 1988 Summer Olympics in Busan, South Korea as a crew member in the Soling. With helmsman Tassos Boudouris and fellow crew members Antonios Bountouris and Dimitrios Deligiannis they took the 18th place.
