= Michel Kermarec =

Olympic sailor from France

Personal information
- Nationality: France
- Born: 20 June 1958 (age 67) Gironde
- Height: 1.72 m (5.6 ft)

Sport

Sailing career
- Class: Soling
- Club: Club Nautique de Nice
- Updated on 28 February 2020

Michel Kermarec (born 20 June 1958) is a sailor from Gironde, France, who represented his country at the 1988 Summer Olympics in Busan, South Korea as helmsman in the Soling. With crew members Stanislas Dripaux and Xavier Phelipon they took the 6th place.
