= Bernd Knuppel =

Olympic sailor from Uruguay

Personal information
- Full name: Bernd Knuppel Barenberg
- Nationality: Uruguay
- Born: 7 August 1962 (age 63)
- Height: 1.83 m (6.0 ft)

Sailing career
- Sport: Sailing
- Class: Soling
- Updated on 27 February 2020

Bernd Knuppel (born 7 August 1962) is a sailor from Uruguay, who represented his country at the 1984 Summer Olympics in Los Angeles, United States as helmsman in the Soling. With crew members Alejandro Ferreiro and Enrique Dupont they took the 7th place.
