= Jean Braure =

US Virgin Islands sailor (born 1935)

Personal information
- Full name: Jean Alphonse Braure
- Nationality: United States Virgin Islands
- Born: 24 May 1935 (age 90) Paris, France
- Height: 174 cm (5 ft 9 in)
- Weight: 65 kg (143 lb)

Sport

Sailing career
- Class: Soling
- Updated on 27 February 2020

Jean Alphonse Braure (born 24 May 1935) is a sailor from United States Virgin Islands, who represented his country at the 1984 Summer Olympics in Los Angeles, United States as helmsman in the Soling. With crew members Kirk Grybowski and Marlon Singh they took the 22nd place.
