= Dean Gordon (sailor) =

Olympic sailor from Australia

Personal information
- Nationality: Australia
- Born: 4 November 1959 (age 66)
- Height: 1.90 m (6.2 ft)

Sport

Sailing career
- Class: Soling
- Updated on 27 February 2020

Dean Gordons (born 4 November 1959) is a sailor from Australia, who represented his country at the 1984 Summer Olympics in Los Angeles, United States as crew member in the Soling. With helmsman Gary Sheard and fellow crew member Tim Dorning they took the 7th place.
