= Gary Sheard =

Olympic sailor from Australia

Personal information
- Nationality: Australia
- Born: 20 April 1969 (age 56)
- Height: 1.79 m (5.9 ft)

Sport

Sailing career
- Class: Soling
- Updated on 27 February 2020

Gary Sheard is a sailor from Australia, who represented his country at the 1984 Summer Olympics in Los Angeles, United States as helmsman in the Soling. With crew members Tim Dorning and Dean Gordon they took the 7th place.
