= Michael Farthofer =

Olympic sailor from Austria

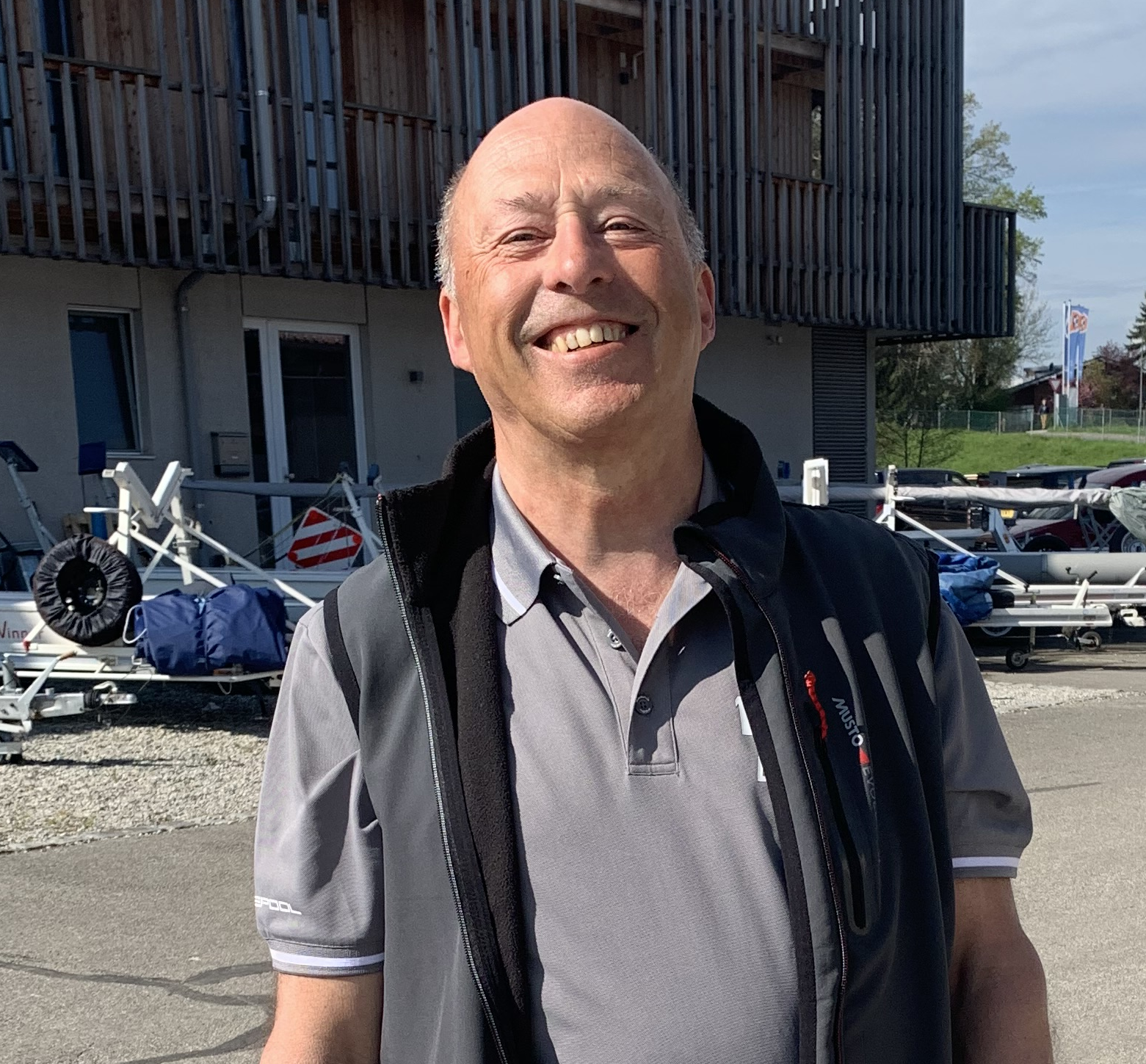
- European Champion Soling 1981

Personal information
- Nationality: Austria
- Born: 8 June 1955 (age 70) Vancouver, Canada
- Height: 1.74 m (5.7 ft)

Sport

Sailing career
- Class: Soling
- Updated on 15 May 2022

Michael Farthofer (born 8 June 1955) is a sailor from Austria, who represented his country at the 1984 Summer Olympics in Los Angeles, United States as helmsman in the Soling. With crew members Christian Holler and Richard Holler they took the 15th place.
