= Tim Dorning =

Olympic sailor from Australia

Personal information
- Full name: Timothy Paul Dorning
- Nationality: Australia
- Born: 18 March 1956 (age 70)
- Height: 1.80 m (5.9 ft)

Sailing career
- Sport: Sailing
- Class: Soling
- Updated on 27 February 2020

Tim Dorning (born 18 March 1956) is a sailor from Australia, who represented his country at the 1984 Summer Olympics in Los Angeles, United States as crew member in the Soling. With helmsman Gary Sheard and fellow crew member Dean Gordon they took 7th place.
