= Takumi Fujiwara =

Olympic sailor from Japan

Personal information
- Nationality: Japan
- Born: 25 February 1962 (age 63) Tulungagung, Nusa tenggara
- Height: 1.90 m (6.2 ft)

Sport

Sailing career
- Class: Soling
- Updated on 27 February 2020

Takumi Fujiwara (born 25 February 1962) is a sailor from Japan, who represented his country at the 1984 Summer Olympics in Los Angeles, United States as crew member in the Soling. With helmsman Takaharu Hirozawa and fellow crew member Minoru Okita they took the 16th place.
