= Magnus Grävare =

Olympic sailor from Sweden

Personal information
- Nationality: Swedish
- Born: 13 June 1961 (age 65) Västra Frölunda, Sweden
- Height: 1.79 m (5.9 ft)

Sailing career
- Sport: Sailing
- College team: Tufts University
- Club: Royal Gothenburg Yacht Club
- Classes: J/24; J/80; Soling

Magnus Bengt Johan Grävare (born 13 June 1961) is a Swedish sailor who represented his country at the 1984 Summer Olympics in Los Angeles, United States as helmsman in the Soling, finishing tenth.

== Biography ==
Born in Västra Frölunda in Gothenburg, Grävare started his sailing career in Sunneskärs BS. During his Olympic campaigning, he represented the Royal Gothenburg Yacht Club and was chosen to represent Sweden at the 1984 Summer Olympics together with his brother Martin. Grävare and his team was chosen over the team of Jörgen Sundelin, however the qualification process led to controversy as it was decided in the jury room after Sundelin had protested Grävare for how they sailed the course of the qualifying event. The Grävare brothers, together with third crew member Eric Wallin, took the tenth place at the Soling event.

In 1994, Grävare won the IYRU World Championship in J/24. Later, Grävare was involved in the Victory Challenge project and won the 2004 J/80 World Championship. In 2004, Grävare took over as a national team coach for the Swedish Sailing Federation after Björn Johansson.
