= Aurelio Dalla Vecchia =

Olympic sailor from Italy

Personal information
- Nationality: Italy
- Born: 18 November 1958 Naples
- Died: 18 April 2024 (aged 65)
- Height: 1.89 m (6.2 ft)

Sport

Sailing career
- Class: Soling
- Updated on 27 February 2020

Aurelio Dalla Vecchia (18 November 1958 – 18 April 2024) was a sailor from Naples, Italy who represented his country at the 1984 Summer Olympics in Los Angeles, United States as crew member in the Soling. With helmsman Gianluca Lamaro and fellow crew member Valerio Romano they took the 9th place. Aurelio took also part in the 1988 Summer Olympics in Busan, South Korea. With same team they took the 13th place in the Soling.
