= Eric Tulla =

Olympic sailor from Puerto Rico

Personal information
- Nationality: Puerto Rico
- Born: 23 August 1948 (age 77)
- Height: 1.73 m (5.7 ft)

Sport

Sailing career
- Class: Soling
- Updated on 27 February 2020

Eric Tulla (born 23 August 1948) is a sailor from Puerto Rico, who represented his country at the 1984 Summer Olympics in Los Angeles, United States as helmsman in the Soling. With crew members Jerry Pignolet and Ronnie Ramos they took the 19th place.
