= Richard Holler =

Olympic sailor from Austria

Personal information
- Nationality: Austria
- Born: 9 November 1958 (age 67)
- Height: 1.88 m (6.2 ft)

Sport

Sailing career
- Class: Soling
- Updated on 27 February 2020

Richard Holler (born 9 November 1958) is a sailor from Austria, who represented his country at the 1984 Summer Olympics in Los Angeles, United States as crew member in the Soling. With helmsman Michael Farthofer and fellow crew member and brother Christian Holler they took the 15th place.
