= Antonios Bountouris =

Olympic sailor from Greece (born 1959)

Personal information
- Native name: Αντώνηος Μπουντούρης
- Nationality: Greece
- Born: 1 February 1959 (age 66)
- Height: 1.87 m (6.1 ft)

Sport

Sailing career
- Class: Soling
- Updated on 28 February 2020

Antonios Bountouris (born 1 February 1959) is a sailor from Greece. who represented his country at the 1988 Summer Olympics in Busan, South Korea as crew member in the Soling. With helmsman Tassos Boudouris and fellow crew members Georgios Prekas and Dimitrios Deligiannis they took the 18th place. Antonios was due to illness replaced by Dimitrios after the third race.
