= Eckhard Löll =

Olympic sailor from West-Germany

Personal information
- Nationality: West Germany
- Born: 1 March 1954 (age 71) Oberhausen
- Height: 1.89 m (6.2 ft)

Sport

Sailing career
- Class: Soling
- Club: SK Bayer Uerdingen
- Updated on 27 February 2020

Eckhard Löll (born 1 March 1954) is a sailor from Oberhausen, West-Germany, who represented his country at the 1984 Summer Olympics in Los Angeles, United States as crew member in the Soling. With helmsman Willi Kuhweide and fellow crew member Axel May they took the 8th place.
