= Naseem Khan (sailor) =

Olympic sailor from Pakistan

Personal information
- Nationality: Pakistan
- Born: 5 July 1958 (age 67)
- Height: 1.70 m (5.6 ft)

Sport

Sailing career
- Class: Soling
- Updated on 27 February 2020

Naseem Khan (born 5 July 1958) is a sailor from Pakistan, who represented his country at the 1984 Summer Olympics in Los Angeles, United States as crew member in the Soling. With helmsman Khalid Akhtar and fellow crew member Adnan Yousoof they took the 20th place.
