= Christian Holler =

Olympic sailor from Austria

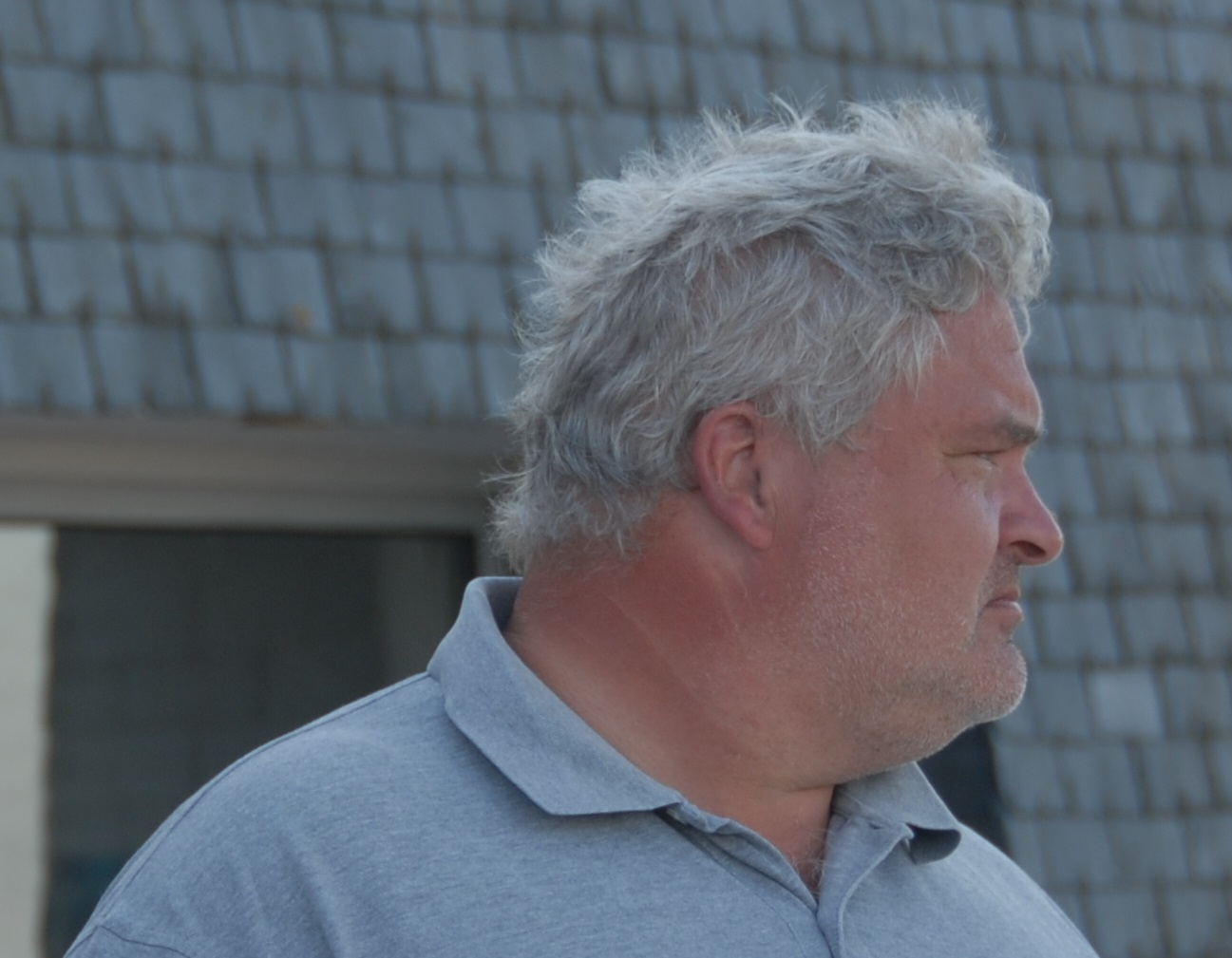
- Christian Holler at the Soling Europeans 2014 Saint-Pierre-Quiberon

Personal information
- Nationality: Austria
- Born: 17 September 1961 (age 64)
- Height: 1.88 m (6.2 ft)

Sport

Sailing career
- Class: Soling
- Updated on 27 February 2020

Christian Holler (born 17 September 1961) is a sailor from Austria, who represented his country at the 1984 Summer Olympics in Los Angeles, United States as crew member in the Soling. With helmsman Michael Farthofer and fellow crew member and brother Richard Holler they took the 15th place.
