= Valerio Romano =

Olympic sailor from Italy

Personal information
- Nationality: Italy
- Born: 14 October 1952 (age 73) Naples
- Height: 1.85 m (6.1 ft)

Sport

Sailing career
- Class: Soling
- Updated on 27 February 2020

Valerio Romano (born 14 October 1952) is a sailor from Naples, Italy, who represented his country at the 1984 Summer Olympics in Los Angeles, United States as crew member in the Soling. With helmsman Gianluca Lamaro and fellow crew member Aurelio Dalla Vecchia they took the 9th place. Valerio took also part in the 1988 Summer Olympics in Busan, South Korea. With same team they took the 13th place in the Soling.
