= Elvet Meyers =

British Virgin Islands sailor

Elvet Meyers (born May 2, 1960) is a sailor who competed for the British Virgin Islands. Meyers competed at the 1984 Summer Olympics in Los Angeles, he was part of the three man team that entered the Soling class and out of 22 crews they finished 21st.
