= Gianluca Lamaro =

Olympic sailor from Italy

Personal information
- Nationality: Italy
- Born: 12 November 1956 (age 69) Naples
- Height: 1.77 m (5.8 ft)

Sport

Sailing career
- Class: Soling
- Updated on 27 February 2020

Gianluca Lamaro is a sailor from Naples, Italy, who represented his country at the 1984 Summer Olympics in Los Angeles, United States as helmsman in the Soling. With crew members Aurelio Dalla Vecchia and Valerio Romano they took the 9th place. Gianluca took also part in the 1988 Summer Olympics in Busan, South Korea as helmsman in the Soling. With same crew members then they took the 13th place.
