= Jan Mathiasen =

Danish sailor

Medal record

Men's sailing

Representing Denmark

Olympic Games
Bronze medal – third place	1988 Seoul	Soling class

Jan Mathiasen (born 9 May 1957 in Frederecia, Denmark) is a Danish competitive sailor and Olympic medalist. He won a bronze medal in the Soling class at the 1988 Summer Olympics in Seoul, together with Jesper Bank and Steen Secher.

He represented Fredericia Sejlklub.
