= Chris Law (sailor) =

British sailor

Chris Law (5 July 1952 – 24 July 2007) was a British sailor who was a winner of the Finn Gold Cup in 1976. His talent was sometimes overshadowed by his bad luck and volatile temperament. He died by suicide at Lake Constance in 2007.

== Sailing career ==
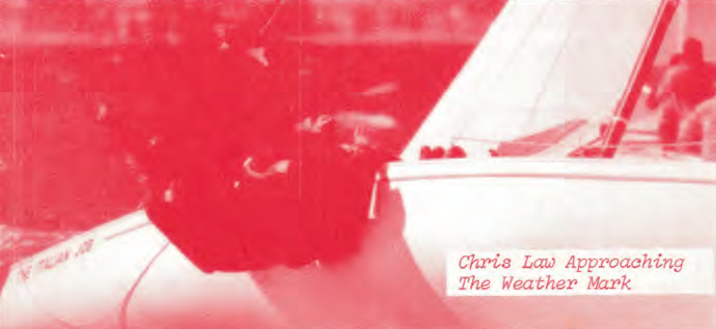

Law started sailing, crewed by his younger brother Tim, in the Cadet dinghy on the Thames at Teddington. He came 4th in the Cadet World Championship in Spain in 1969 and 4th in the 1970 Cadet World Championship in Hobart, Australia.

He then moved on to the Finn class, where he narrowly missed Olympic qualification in 1972 and 1976. During this time his first daughter Charlotte was born. He won the Finn Gold Cup in 1976 at the age of 23, one of the youngest ever winners, and then became the father of his second daughter – Amy. He qualified for the Olympics in 1980 and then suffered the misfortune of being prevented from competing by the Moscow Olympic boycott. Law had been seen as a strong candidate for a medal. He sailed a Soling in the 1984 Olympics, coming 4th and again missing a medal.

Law sailed in the 1983 and 1987 America's Cup campaigns on the British challengers Victory and White Crusader. He also sailed in the 1995 campaign in the Australian challenger Sydney '95 before leaving after a dispute with the campaign management. During the 1990s he was a highly ranked match racer and won the 1994 Congressional Cup.

He also sailed in several Admiral's Cup campaigns, with varied success, including sailing in the infamous 1979 Fastnet race. Possibly his most notorious Admiral's Cup campaign came in 1999 when he had a tempestuous time and was blamed for losing the Admiral's Cup for Britain. He announced his retirement from international representative sailing after that event.

Law was a popular television commentator for the 2000 America's Cup in Auckland, New Zealand and a successful competitor on the World Match Racing Tour, where he won 12 Category One events.
