= Soling European Championship results (1990–1994) =

Soling European Championships

Soling
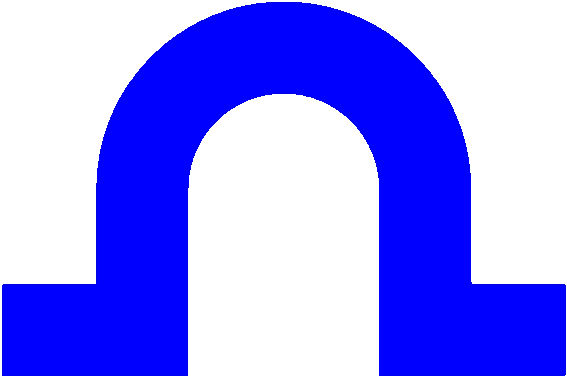

The main article describes all European Soling Championships from one the first held in 1968 to the announced Championships in the near future. This article states the detailed results, where relevant the controversies, and the progression of the Championship during the series race by race of the European Soling Championships in the years 1990, 1991, 1992, 1993 and 1994. This is based on the major sources: World Sailing, the world governing body for the sport of sailing recognized by the IOC and the IPC, and the publications of the International Soling Association. Unfortunately not all crew names are documented in the major sources.

== 1990 Final results ==
1990
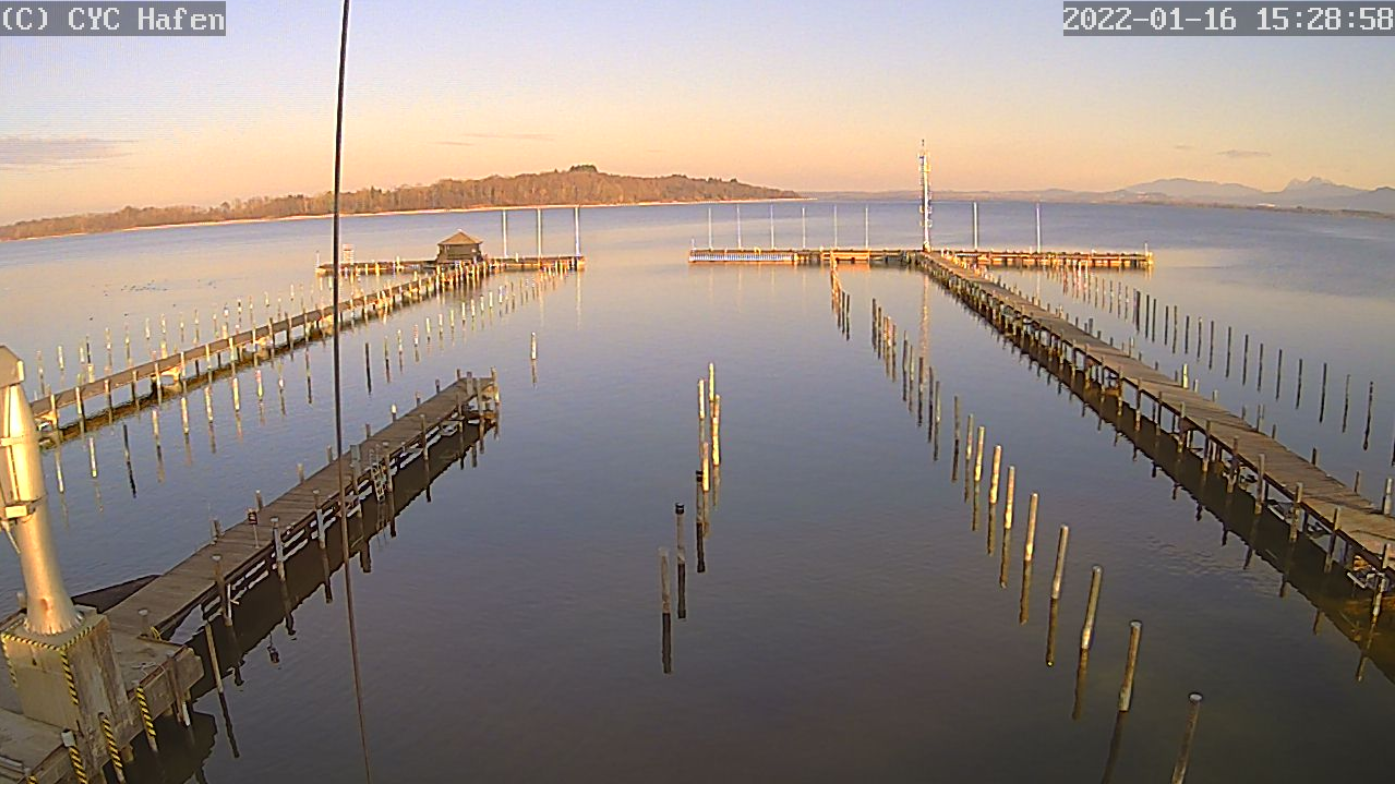

Event title
- Edition: 23
- Host: Chiemsee Yacht Club

Event details
- Venue: Prien am Chiemsee, West Germany
- Dates: 27 April – 6 May
- Yachts: 69
- Opening ceremony: 30 April

Competitors
- Competitors: 207
- Competing nations: 18

Results
- (gold) Gold: France; Marc Bouet; Fabrice Levet; Alain Pointet
- (silver) Silver: East Germany; Jochen Schümann; Thomas Flach; Bernd Jäkel
- (bronze) Bronze: Netherlands; Roy Heiner; Yska Minks; Ed van der Steene

Rank	Country	Helmsman	Crew	Sail No.	Race 1		Race 2		Race 3		Race 4		Race 5		Race 6		Race 7		Total	Total – discard
Rank	Country	Helmsman	Crew	Sail No.	Pos.	Pts.	Pos.	Pts.	Pos.	Pts.	Pos.	Pts.	Pos.	Pts.	Pos.	Pts.	Pos.	Pts.	Total	Total – discard
1st place, gold medalist(s)	FRA	Marc Bouet	Fabrice Levet; Alain Pointet	F 181	2	3.0	12	18.0	4	8.0	8	14.0	6	11.7	~~25~~	~~31.0~~	2	3.0	88.7	57.7
2nd place, silver medalist(s)	GDR	Jochen Schüman	Thomas Flach; Bernd Jäkel	DDR 1	3	5.7	4	8.0	21	27.0	1	0.0	~~22~~	~~28.0~~	12	18.0	1	0.0	86.7	58.7
3rd place, bronze medalist(s)	NED	Roy Heiner	Ed van der Steene; Yska Minks	H 26	4	8.0	6	11.7	5	10.0	7	13.0	12	18.0	11	17.0	~~19~~	~~25.0~~	102.7	77.7
4	GDR	Helmar Nauck	Norbert Hellriegel; Sven Diedering	DDR 4	14	20.0	5	10.0	1	0.0	~~20~~	~~26.0~~	9	15.0	6	11.7	18	24.0	106.7	80.7
5	USA	Kevin Mahaney	Jim Brady; Doug Kern	US 787	~~47~~	~~53.0~~	3	5.7	8	14.0	16	22.0	17	23.0	18	24.0	10	16.0	157.7	104.7
6	DEN	Jesper Bank	Jesper Seier; Steen Secher	D 92	19	25.0	1	0.0	~~25~~	~~31.0~~	4	8.0	21	27.0	20	26.0	15	21.0	138.0	107.0
7	FRA	Thierry Peponnet	Daniel Ferre; Gildas Morvan	F 188	8	14.0	8	14.0	~~DSQ~~	~~76.0~~	13	19.0	2	3.0	2	3.0	49	55.0	184.0	108.0
8	FRG	Wolfgang Gerz	Knabe; Matthias Adamczewski	G 277	28	34.0	2	3.0	7	13.0	~~48~~	~~54.0~~	13	19.0	13	19.0	14	20.0	162.0	108.0
9	FRG	Fritz Geis	Richard Fricke; Karl Fricke	G 2	22	28.0	~~33~~	~~39.0~~	3	5.7	9	15.0	4	8.0	19	25.0	28	34.0	154.7	115.7
10	NOR	Rune Jacobsen	Anders Andersen; Pai Christoffersen	N 104	7	13.0	10	16.0	18	24.0	~~36~~	~~42.0~~	28	34.0	4	8.0	17	23.0	160.0	118.0
11	DEN	Morten Hendriksen	Per Anderson; Jan Anderson	D 96	1	0.0	17	23.0	28	34.0	3	5.7	~~45~~	~~51.0~~	29	35.0	22	28.0	176.7	125.7
12	ITA	Flavio Favini	Marco di Natale; Alberto Marelli	I 209	~~PMS~~	~~76.0~~	14	20.0	27	33.0	2	3.0	3	5.7	36	42.0	16	22.0	201.7	125.7
13	GDR	Jörg Hermann	Ingo Hermann; Ingo Borowski	DDR 5	~~30~~	~~36.0~~	25	31.0	2	3.0	12	18.0	20	26.0	23	29.0	13	19.0	162.0	126.0
14	GDR	Björn Oestereich	Laurent Scheel; Steffen Voigt	DDR 3	9	15.0	38	44.0	23	29.0	21	27.0	~~PMS~~	~~76.0~~	1	0.0	6	11.7	202.7	126.7
15	ITA	Marco Rudolfi	Guiseppe De Martino; Faffo Lotti	I 229	5	10.0	11	17.0	15	21.0	10	16.0	~~31~~	~~37.0~~	31	37.0	20	26.0	164.0	127.0
16	URS	Serhiy Pichuhin	Gennadiy Strakh; Andrey Nikandrov	SR 41	~~46~~	~~52.0~~	23	29.0	43	49.0	15	21.0	1	0.0	10	16.0	12	18.0	185.0	133.0
17	FIN	Kenneth Thelen	Henrik Thelen; Juha Valtanen	L 48	25	31.0	7	13.0	~~42~~	~~48.0~~	6	11.7	16	22.0	9	15.0	42	48.0	188.7	140.7
18	NOR	Terje Wang	Erling Landsværk; Flock	N 107	12	18.0	15	21.0	29	35.0	35	41.0	~~36~~	~~42.0~~	17	23.0	3	5.7	185.7	143.7
19	FRA	Francois Brenac	Stanislas Dripaux; Jules Mazars	F 162	10	16.0	~~DSQ~~	~~76.0~~	19	25.0	19	25.0	11	17.0	40	46.0	11	17.0	222.0	146.0
20	SWE	Magnus Holmberg	Johan Barne; Björn Alm	S 135	11	17.0	18	24.0	~~40~~	~~46.0~~	14	20.0	8	14.0	35	41.0	25	31.0	193.0	147.0
21	SWE	Per Åhlby	Jonson; Jan-Olov Sandberg	S 132	~~36~~	~~42.0~~	19	25.0	10	16.0	28	34.0	29	35.0	7	13.0	24	30.0	195.0	153.0
22	SWE	Nordström	Norrby; Öberg	S 139	~~39~~	~~45.0~~	29	35.0	51	57.0	5	10.0	36	42.0	14	20.0	23	29.0	238.0	181.0
23	AUT	Michael Luschan	Georg Stadler; Hannes Blaschke	0E 73	~~48~~	~~54.0~~	34	40.0	12	18.0	22	28.0	5	10.0	48	54.0	27	33.0	237.0	183.0
24	ITA	Mario Celon	Claudio Celon; Bouetti	I 237	63	69.0	16	22.0	9	15.0	25	31.0	18	24.0	16	22.0	~~DNF~~	~~76.0~~	259.0	183.0
25	FRG	Andy Vinçon	Lippert; Peter Dörsch	G 280	40	46.0	50	56.0	6	11.7	18	24.0	25	31.0	~~DSQ~~	~~76.0~~	9	15.0	259.7	183.7
26	FRA	Luc Pillot	Alain Champy; Le Morment	F 150	~~49~~	~~55.0~~	26	32.0	31	37.0	11	17.0	19	25.0	26	32.0	38	44.0	242.0	187.0
27	FRG	Thomas Jungblut	Gerrit Bartel; Tim Kröger	G 269	16	22.0	20	26.0	37	43.0	31	37.0	~~52~~	~~58.0~~	8	14.0	40	46.0	246.0	188.0
28	DEN	Theis Palm	Arentzen; Lund	D 98	17	23.0	44	50.0	22	28.0	17	23.0	15	21.0	~~PMS~~	~~76.0~~	37	43.0	264.0	188.0
29	ESP	Fernando León	(now) Felipe VI; Alfredo Vázquez	E 183	23	29.0	24	30.0	20	26.0	~~PMS~~	~~76.0~~	49	55.0	33	39.0	5	10.0	265.0	189.0
30	GBR	David Tabb	Martin Borrett; McClean	K 148	13	19.0	30	36.0	34	40.0	30	36.0	33	39.0	24	30.0	~~39~~	~~45.0~~	245.0	200.0
31	SWE	Göran Sandberg	Anderson; Bjornberg	S 124	55	61.0	13	19.0	~~58~~	~~64.0~~	26	32.0	14	20.0	34	40.0	32	38.0	274.0	210.0
32	GRE	Tassos Boudouris	Dimitrios Deligiannis; Dimou	GR 32	33	39.0	35	41.0	32	38.0	33	39.0	~~48~~	~~54.0~~	38	44.0	7	13.0	268.0	214.0
33	ITA	Bianchi	Piva; Maestri	I 234	38	44.0	45	51.0	17	23.0	~~DSQ~~	~~76.0~~	53	59.0	30	36.0	4	8.0	297.0	221.0
34	FRG	Daniel Diesing	Thomas Olbrich; Fischer	G 271	44	50.0	39	45.0	26	32.0	32	38.0	~~47~~	~~53.0~~	5	10.0	41	47.0	275.0	222.0
35	ITA	Giova Arrivabene	Fabio Toccoli; Cagnoni	I 232	15	21.0	27	33.0	41	47.0	49	55.0	30	36.0	32	38.0	~~54~~	~~60.0~~	290.0	230.0
36	FRG	Roman Koch	Maxl Koch; Tripp	G 266	29	35.0	21	27.0	~~61~~	~~67.0~~	27	33.0	39	45.0	22	28.0	58	64.0	299.0	232.0
37	SWE	Martin Palsson	Gran Alm; Pettersson	S 140	20	26.0	~~DSQ~~	~~76.0~~	11	17.0	23	29.0	42	48.0	44	50.0	57	63.0	309.0	233.0
38	AUT	Carl Auteried Jr.	Thomas Beclin; Thomas Maschkiwitz	OE 97	32	38.0	~~56~~	~~62.0~~	24	30.0	39	45.0	32	38.0	39	45.0	33	39.0	297.0	235.0
39	FRG	Schmied	König; König	G 211	35	41.0	22	28.0	13	19.0	42	48.0	~~DSQ~~	~~76.0~~	58	64.0	36	42.0	318.0	242.0
40	GBR	Pyatt	Jardine; Hawkins	K 150	27	33.0	31	37.0	39	45.0	~~60~~	~~66.0~~	55	61.0	15	21.0	45	51.0	314.0	248.0
41	HUN	Antal Székely	Csermendy; Öry	M 18	52	58.0	~~DSQ~~	~~76.0~~	45	51.0	24	30.0	23	29.0	51	57.0	21	27.0	328.0	252.0
42	GDR	Schulze	Thum; Michael Zachries	DDR 15	~~57~~	~~63.0~~	28	34.0	59	65.0	47	53.0	10	16.0	49	55.0	26	32.0	318.0	253.0
43	NOR	Dag Usterud	Eilert Vierli; Kristian Krogholm	N 111	41	47.0	~~RET~~	~~76.0~~	54	60.0	41	47.0	40	46.0	3	5.7	43	49.0	330.7	254.7
44	HUN	Szabolcs Detre	Zsolt Detre; Zoltan Sass	M 63	64	70.0	43	49.0	16	22.0	46	52.0	24	30.0	27	33.0	~~PMS~~	~~76.0~~	332.0	256.0
45	HUN	György Fináczy	Szendrey; Nagy	M 25	45	51.0	32	38.0	53	59.0	~~61~~	~~67.0~~	7	13.0	52	58.0	34	40.0	326.0	259.0
46	AUT	Christian Spießberger	Burian; Christian Feichtinger	OE 94	~~54~~	~~60.0~~	37	43.0	44	50.0	50	56.0	44	50.0	42	48.0	8	14.0	321.0	261.0
47	ITA	Angelini	Gori; Orlandi	I 201	24	30.0	41	47.0	47	53.0	44	50.0	26	32.0	45	51.0	~~DNF~~	~~76.0~~	339.0	263.0
48	FRG	Rothlauf	Neufing; Fricke	G 259	50	56.0	9	15.0	35	41.0	~~DNF~~	~~76.0~~	43	49.0	DSQ	76.0	29	35.0	348.0	272.0
49	NED	Rudy den Outer	Robert Molsbergen; Jaap de Zeeuw	H 22	6	11.7	55	61.0	46	52.0	34	40.0	41	47.0	55	61.0	~~56~~	~~62.0~~	334.7	272.7
50	ESP	Gutierrez	Plaza; Junneman	E 146	18	24.0	40	46.0	65	71.0	55	61.0	34	40.0	28	34.0	~~DSQ~~	~~76.0~~	352.0	276.0
51	HUN	György Wossala	László Kovácsi; G. Bankuty	M 77	21	27.0	~~54~~	~~60.0~~	49	55.0	43	49.0	46	52.0	50	56.0	44	50.0	349.0	289.0
52	FRG	Axel Mertens	Michael Dümchen; Rene Schmitt	G 276	~~61~~	~~67.0~~	53	59.0	14	20.0	45	51.0	60	66.0	54	60.0	30	36.0	359.0	292.0
53	FIN	Heikki Hohtari	Joni Nuorivaara; Myllylä	L 50	~~58~~	~~64.0~~	42	48.0	56	62.0	52	58.0	35	41.0	21	27.0	50	56.0	356.0	292.0
54	SUI	Munier	Owen; Lacour	Z 273	~~59~~	~~65.0~~	47	53.0	38	44.0	54	60.0	27	33.0	41	47.0	51	57.0	359.0	294.0
55	SWE	Peter Carlsson	Nilsson; Thomas Olsson	S 131	34	40.0	62	68.0	36	42.0	40	46.0	37	43.0	~~60~~	~~66.0~~	52	58.0	363.0	295.0
56	ESP	Wizner	Payaras; Ramos	E 221	31	37.0	46	52.0	~~55~~	~~61.0~~	29	35.0	54	60.0	53	59.0	48	54.0	358.0	297.0
57	ITA	Giorgio Passoni	Bonsignore; Caruso	I 193	53	59.0	36	42.0	52	58.0	53	59.0	~~DNF~~	~~76.0~~	37	43.0	46	52.0	389.0	313.0
58	FRG	Puppe	von Schuckmann; Winter	G 228	37	43.0	49	55.0	50	56.0	38	44.0	59	65.0	~~61~~	~~67.0~~	55	61.0	391.0	324.0
59	FRG	Sauer	Dorner; Trappel	G 189	~~67~~	~~73.0~~	57	63.0	57	63.0	37	43.0	63	69.0	64	70.0	31	37.0	418.0	345.0
60	FRG	Karl Haist	Kuchier; Thiem	G 258	42	48.0	~~58~~	~~64.0~~	48	54.0	58	64.0	DND	76.0	56	62.0	35	41.0	409.0	345.0
61	USA	Charlie Kamps	Toby Kamps; Gleitz	US 715	60	66.0	~~61~~	~~67.0~~	33	39.0	59	65.0	58	64.0	46	52.0	60	66.0	419.0	352.0
62	AUS	Matt Hayes	Andrew Cutler; Douglas Ross-Munro	KA 152	43	49.0	52	58.0	30	36.0	~~PMS~~	~~76.0~~	RET	76.0	62	68.0	PMS	76.0	439.0	363.0
63	AUT	Franz Wageneder	Reinhand Födinger; Walter Raudaschl	OE 36	56	62.0	51	57.0	60	66.0	57	63.0	50	56.0	57	63.0	~~DNF~~	~~76.0~~	443.0	367.0
64	NED	Rien Segaar	Jeroen Hopman; Mulder	H 20	51	57.0	~~DNS~~	~~76.0~~	DSQ	76.0	56	62.0	57	63.0	43	49.0	53	59.0	442.0	366.0
65	AUT	Peter Menzel	Stefan Meusburger; Heinz Moche	OE 51	~~66~~	~~72.0~~	59	65.0	62	68.0	63	69.0	56	62.0	47	53.0	47	53.0	442.0	370.0
66	SUI	Zesiger	von Gunten; Bille	Z 269	~~68~~	~~74.0~~	63	69.0	63	69.0	51	57.0	51	57.0	59	65.0	61	67.0	458.0	384.0
67	AUS	William Hodder	Brennam; Johnson	KA 172	26	32.0	48	54.0	~~DNS~~	~~76.0~~	DNS	76.0	DNS	76.0	DNS	76.0	DNS	76.0	466.0	390.0
68	GBR	Alan Holmes	Purdy; Riley	K 149	~~65~~	~~71.0~~	60	66.0	66	72.0	64	70.0	61	67.0	63	69.0	59	65.0	480.0	408.0
69	NED	Bram Soethoudt	Wilco Wessels; Camiel Volmer	H 24	62	68.0	64	70.0	64	70.0	62	68.0	62	68.0	~~65~~	~~71.0~~	62	68.0	483.0	412.0

Legend: DND – Disqualification non discardable; DNF – Did not finish; DNS – Did not start; DSQ – Disqualified; PMS – Premature start; RET – Retired; YMP – Yacht materially prejudiced;
Discard is crossed out and does not count for the overall result.

- 1990 Progress

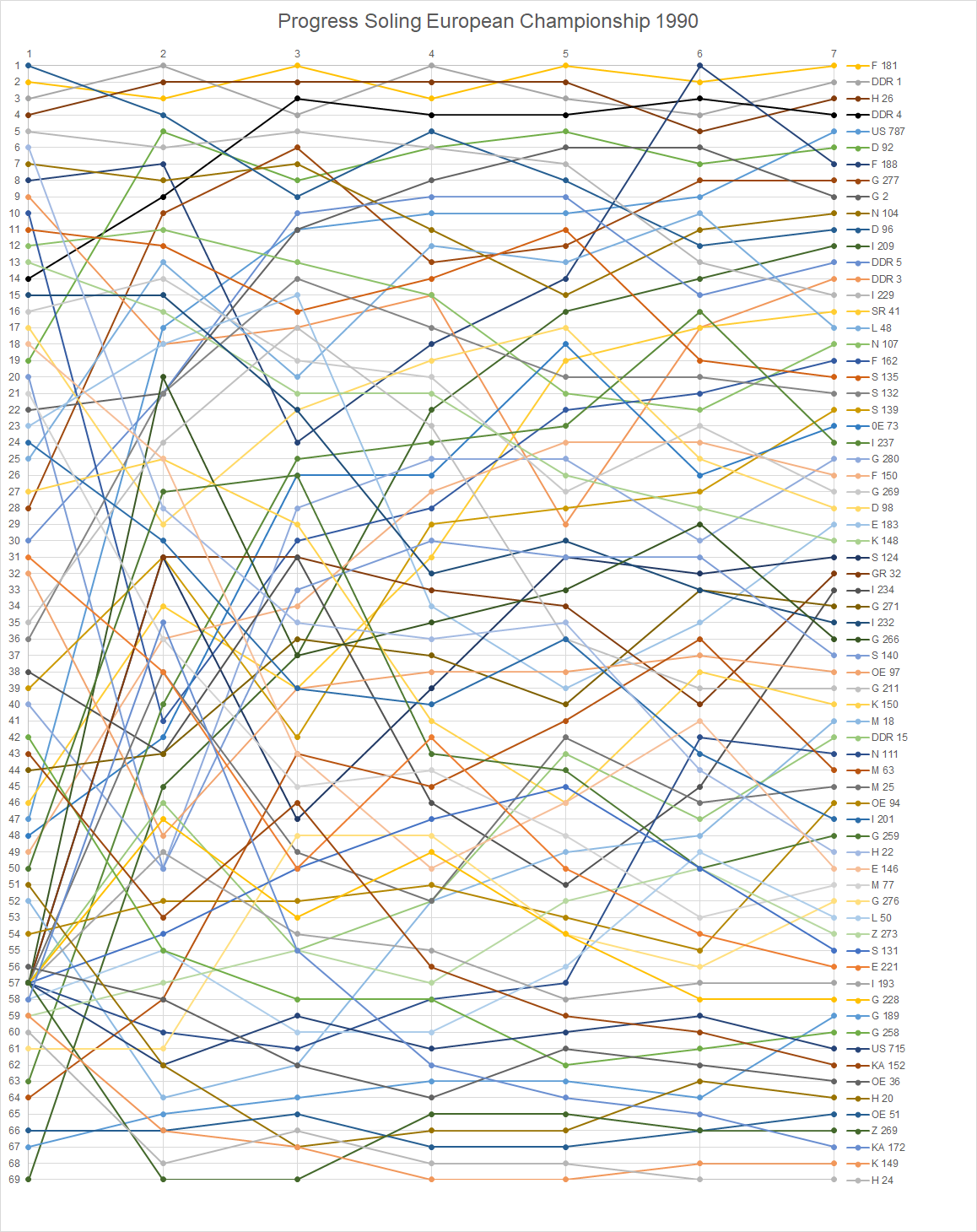

== 1991 Final results ==
1991
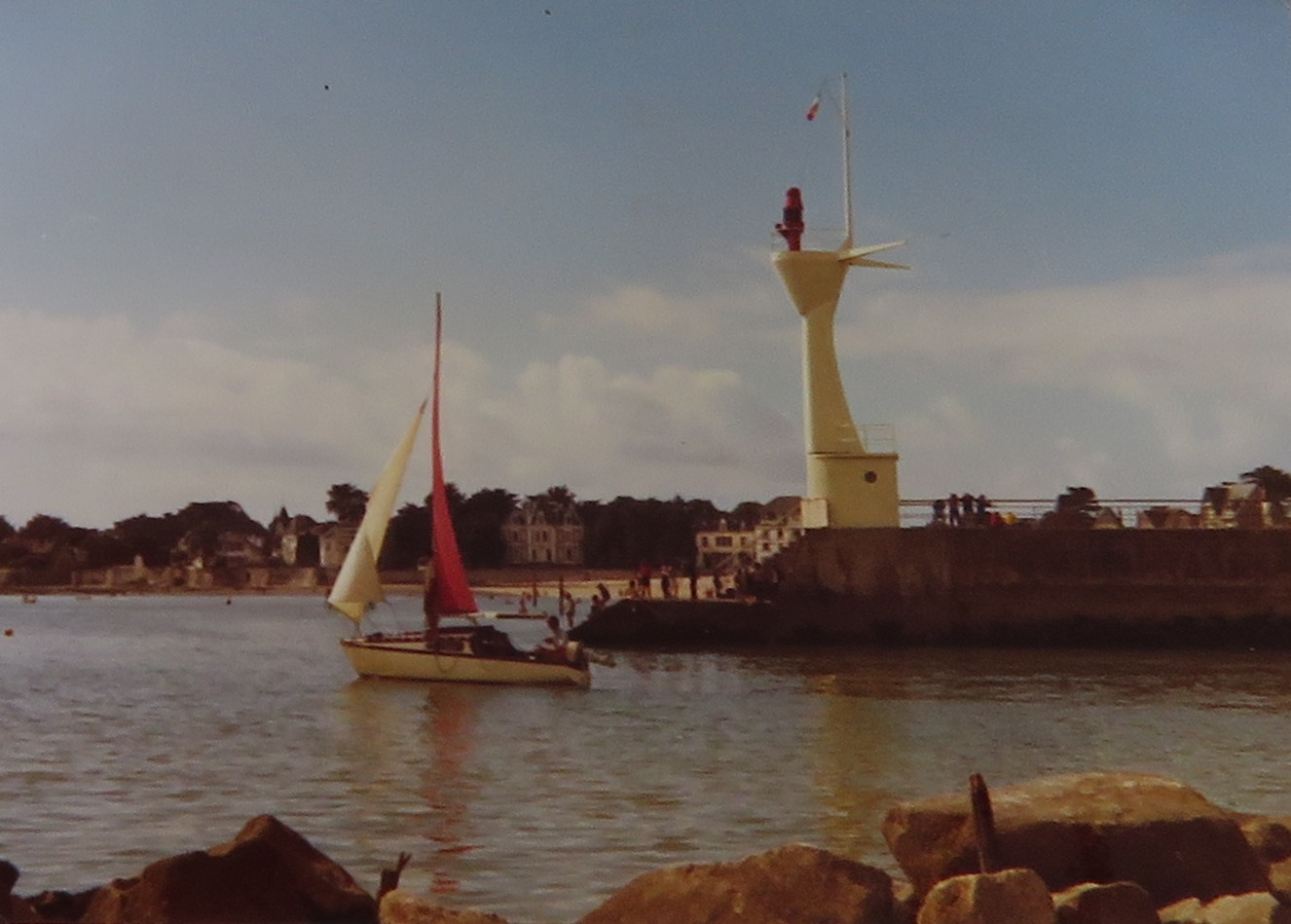

Event title
- Edition: 24
- Host: The Yacht Clubs of La Baule, Pornichet and Le Pouligen

Event details
- Venue: La Baule, France
- Dates: 30 May – 9 June
- Yachts: 83
- Key people: Philippe Richard

Competitors
- Competitors: 249
- Competing nations: 19

Results
- (gold) Gold: United States; Dave Curtis; Brad Dellenbaugh; Paul Murphy
- (silver) Silver: Sweden; Magnus Holmberg; Johan Barne; Björn Alm
- (bronze) Bronze: Germany; Jochen Schümann; Thomas Flach; Bernd Jäkel

Rank	Country	Helmsman	Crew	Sail No.	Race 1		Race 2		Race 3		Race 4		Race 5		Race 6		Race 7		Total	Total – discard
Rank	Country	Helmsman	Crew	Sail No.	Pos.	Pts.	Pos.	Pts.	Pos.	Pts.	Pos.	Pts.	Pos.	Pts.	Pos.	Pts.	Pos.	Pts.	Total	Total – discard
1st place, gold medalist(s)	USA	Dave Curtis	Brad Dellenbaugh; Paul Murphy	US 786	5	10	2	3	2	3	~~29~~	~~35~~	6	11.7	4	8	1	0	70.7	35.7
2nd place, silver medalist(s)	SWE	Magnus Holmberg	Johan Barne; Björn Alm	S 135	7	13	~~PMS~~	~~90~~	1	0	3	5.7	3	5.7	12	18	3	5.7	138.1	48.1
3rd place, bronze medalist(s)	GER	Jochen Schümann	Thomas Flach; Bernd Jäkel	G 1	~~23~~	~~29~~	22	28	7	13	1	0	2	3	2	3	7	13	89	60
4	USA	Kevin Mahaney	Jim Brady; Doug Kern	US 772	1	0	~~26~~	~~32~~	6	11.7	12	18	8	14	1	0	11	17	92.7	60.7
5	DEN	Jesper Bank	Steen Secher; Jesper Seier	D 101	~~20~~	~~26~~	3	5.7	12	18	4	8	1	0	14	20	8	14	91.7	65.7
6	ESP	Fernando León	Vallejo; Alfredo Vázquez	E 183	~~15~~	~~21~~	10	16	5	10	6	11.7	13	19	8	14	5	10	101.7	80.7
7	URS	Serhiy Pichuhin	Chandrava; Volodymyr Korotkov	SR 43	~~16~~	~~22~~	5	10	8	14	5	10	12	18	7	13	15	21	108	86
8	DEN	Morten Hendriksen	Per Anderson; Jan Anderson	D 102	~~35~~	~~41~~	21	27	18	24	17	23	4	8	3	5.7	4	8	136.7	95.7
9	URS	Suhorukov	Gennadiy Strakh; Oleg Miron	SR 4	10	16	6	11.7	24	30	10	16	14	20	~~25~~	~~31~~	2	3	127.7	96.7
10	AUT	Michael Luschan	Georg Stadler; Robert Steinkogler	OE I01	2	3	25	31	~~45~~	~~51~~	14	20	10	16	13	19	14	20	160	109
11	FRA	Marc Bouet	Alain Pointet; Fabrice Levet	F 181	6	11.7	9	15	17	23	23	29	~~39~~	~~45~~	5	10	32	38	171.7	126.7
12	GER	Björn Oestereich	Laurent Scheel; Steffen Voigt	G 284	4	8	1	0	27	33	13	19	32	38	26	32	~~29~~	~~35~~	165	127
13	SWE	Per Åhlby	Jonson; Jan-Olov Sandberg	S 132	~~34~~	~~40~~	36	42	14	20	22	28	7	13	11	17	13	19	179	137
14	FRA	Luc Pillot	Livory; Alain Champy	F 180	17	23	~~44~~	~~50~~	26	32	26	32	15	21	21	27	9	15	200	150
15	FRA	Thierry Peponnet	Daniel Ferre; Gildas Morvan	F 178	18	24	11	17	33	39	~~48~~	~~54~~	5	10	34	40	19	25	209	155
16	SWE	Martin Palsson	Göran Alm; Lars Idmyr	S 140	13	19	19	25	28	34	~~37~~	~~43~~	20	26	16	22	26	32	201	158
17	URS	Nilandrov	Andrey; Ohugunov	SR 41	27	33	~~54~~	~~60~~	13	19	20	26	36	42	6	11.7	21	27	218.7	158.7
18	ITA	Giova Arrivabene	Fabio Toccoli; Cagnoni	I 232	14	20	20	26	16	22	24	30	~~50~~	~~56~~	31	37	18	24	215	159
19	GBR	Andy Beadsworth	Sherrell; Tillen	K 7	~~36~~	~~42~~	14	20	36	42	27	33	24	30	18	24	10	16	207	165
20	ITA	Mario Celon	Blasi; Claudio Celon	I 238	~~52~~	~~58~~	4	8	29	35	32	38	28	34	17	23	23	29	225	167
21	FRA	Francois Brenac	Jules Mazars; Stanislas Dripaux	F 162	~~39~~	~~45~~	37	43	30	36	2	3	29	35	23	29	17	23	214	169
22	FIN	Kenneth Thelen	Henrik Thelen; Georg Tallberg	L 48	22	28	~~42~~	~~48~~	31	37	16	22	31	37	10	16	28	34	222	174
23	SWE	Göran Sandberg	Anderson; Bjornberg	S 124	12	18	33	39	51	57	8	14	~~52~~	~~58~~	29	35	6	11.7	232.7	174.7
24	URS	Tõnu Tõniste	Tauts; Vikson	SR 29	40	46	29	35	4	8	~~57~~	~~63~~	16	22	9	15	48	54	243	180
25	GBR	David Tabb	Martin Borrett; Pearson	K 148	29	35	41	47	~~43~~	~~49~~	35	41	11	17	28	34	12	18	241	192
26	CAN	Paul Thomson	Stuart Flinn; Philip Gow	KC 182	11	17	~~PMS~~	~~90~~	11	17	9	15	23	29	DSQ	90	24	30	288	198
27	AUS	William Hodder	Chris Mason; Michael Mottl	KA 173	30	36	~~PMS~~	~~90~~	23	29	11	17	17	23	41	47	41	47	289	199
28	ITA	Flavio Favini	Marco di Natale; Alberto Marelli	I 209	19	25	17	23	60	66	7	13	49	55	~~PMS~~	~~90~~	16	22	294	204
29	CAN	Allsep	Newman; Gash	KA 166	21	27	32	38	3	5.7	34	40	42	48	40	46	~~DNF~~	~~90~~	294.7	204.7
30	ESP	Wizner	Romero; Wizner	E 221	41	47	8	14	~~48~~	~~54~~	19	25	34	40	38	44	31	37	261	207
31	CAN	Bill Abbott Jr.	Charlie Day; Larry Abbott	KC 1	31	37	40	46	20	26	28	34	19	25	36	42	40	46	256	210
32	ESP	Martinez	Robio; Denaiva	E 92	38	44	13	19	10	16	44	50	35	41	~~PMS~~	~~90~~	44	50	310	220
33	CAN	Hans Fogh	Tarczy; Yuill	KC 181	24	30	24	30	42	48	15	21	~~47~~	~~53~~	45	51	37	43	276	223
34	FRA	Phelipon	Gandolphe; Coulin	F 169	~~62~~	~~68~~	45	51	21	27	30	36	26	32	30	36	36	42	292	224
35	NED	Roy Heiner	Frank Havik; Peter Burggraaff	H 26	28	34	18	24	32	38	21	27	9	15	~~PMS~~	~~90~~	DNC	90	318	228
36	ITA	Marco Rudolfi	Bonsignore; Guiseppe De Martino	I 229	25	31	~~PMS~~	~~90~~	53	59	31	37	37	43	15	21	34	40	321	231
37	GER	Thomas Jungblut	Neufing; Heiko Winkler	G 269	32	38	12	18	35	41	46	52	51	57	~~DSQ~~	~~90~~	25	31	327	237
38	DEN	Poul Richard Høj Jensen	Erik Hansen; Bertil Larsson	D 100	47	53	7	13	25	31	18	24	22	28	~~DSQ~~	~~90~~	DNF	90	329	239
39	USA	Larry Klein	Fortenserry; Morton	US 801	33	39	39	45	40	46	36	42	27	33	32	38	~~DNF~~	~~90~~	333	243
40	LIE	Von Koskuil	Von Koskuil; Ljunquist	LS 1	37	43	~~PMS~~	~~90~~	34	40	45	51	45	51	19	25	33	39	339	249
41	GBR	Glyn Charles	Simon Fry; Goivers	K 151	49	55	~~PMS~~	~~90~~	9	15	25	31	25	31	22	28	DNF	90	340	250
42	GER	Fritz Geis	Sergey Kanov; Thomas Auracher	G 2	26	32	16	22	38	44	~~PMS~~	~~90~~	30	36	27	33	DNF	90	347	257
43	JPN	Kazunori Komatsu	Yasuharu Fujiwara; Hideaki Takashiro	J 34	~~60~~	~~66~~	35	41	57	63	33	39	44	50	20	26	35	41	326	260
44	DEN	Theis Palm	Arentzen; Lund	D 103	~~PMS~~	~~90~~	PMS	90	22	28	54	60	18	24	24	30	27	33	355	265
45	AUS	Ross Murph	Garrett Connolly; McCarthy	KA 2	~~46~~	~~52~~	31	37	39	45	51	57	38	44	37	43	43	49	327	270
46	GBR	Pyatt	Hawkins; Finney	K 152	~~51~~	~~57~~	51	57	44	50	40	46	33	39	44	50	42	48	347	290
47	FIN	Ronnback	Pahlman; Gerkman	L 47	61	67	30	36	15	21	58	64	55	61	39	45	~~DNF~~	~~90~~	384	294
48	HUN	Szabolcs Detre	Zsolt Detre; Zoltan Sass	M 63	45	51	34	40	69	75	42	48	~~56~~	~~62~~	35	41	49	55	372	297
49	NOR	Torgersen	Espen Stokkeland; Jansen	N 114	42	48	59	65	~~PMS~~	~~90~~	38	44	21	27	PMS	90	20	26	390	300
50	HUN	György Wossala	László Kovácsi; Tiborstephan	M 77	44	50	46	52	50	56	~~55~~	~~61~~	48	54	50	56	30	36	365	304
51	HUN	Antal Székely	Hatyka-Uar; Tsennendy	M 18	54	60	~~56~~	~~62~~	49	55	43	49	54	60	32	38	38	44	368	306
52	SUI	Munler	Lacour; Galeto	Z 273	43	49	47	53	54	60	52	58	41	47	46	52	~~DNF~~	~~90~~	409	319
53	AUT	Christian Spießberger	Christian Feichtinger; Franz Fellner	OE 94	56	62	27	33	65	71	~~PMS~~	~~90~~	46	52	43	49	52	58	415	325
54	GER	Andy Vinçon	Thomas Olbrich; Peter Dörsch	G 280	8	14	23	29	72	78	50	56	53	59	~~DNF~~	~~90~~	DNC	90	416	326
55	GER	Daniel Diesing	Uppert; Peuker	G 271	~~67~~	~~73~~	43	49	55	61	47	53	43	49	59	65	46	52	402	329
56	ESP	Gutierrez	De La Ouadra; De Diego	E 145	9	15	15	21	19	25	~~PMS~~	~~90~~	DNC	90	DNC	90	DNC	90	421	331
57	NOR	Rune Jacobsen	Anders Andersen; Thom Haaland	N 104	3	5.7	~~PMS~~	~~90~~	37	43	41	47	48	54	DNF	90	DNC	90	419.7	329.7
58	USA	Charlie Kamps	Rose Hoeksema; Joe Hoeksema	US 802	~~66~~	~~72~~	52	58	46	52	56	62	63	69	47	53	50	56	422	350
59	SUI	D. Schenker	C. Schenker; Owen	Z 271	58	64	49	55	47	53	64	70	~~76~~	~~82~~	48	54	57	63	441	359
60	FRA	Yves Pajot	Hervs; Marc Pajot	F 166	69	75	60	66	52	58	49	55	61	67	~~PMS~~	~~90~~	39	45	456	366
61	DEN	Niels Jensen	Haldager; Jan Faurschov	D 104	57	63	48	54	71	77	~~PMS~~	~~90~~	68	74	49	55	47	53	466	376
62	GER	Axel Mertens	Dümgalen; Dielman	G 276	63	69	28	34	61	67	~~PMS~~	~~90~~	67	73	PMS	90	45	51	474	384
63	NED	Rudy den Outer	Jaap Vonk; Robert Molsbergen	H 22	65	71	~~PMS~~	~~90~~	62	68	60	66	59	65	PMS	90	22	28	478	388
64	AUT	Hollerweger	Balschegg; Volker Moser	OE 83	71	77	55	61	70	76	~~PMS~~	~~90~~	57	63	51	57	51	57	481	391
65	AUS	Matt Hayes	Andrew Cutler; Burke	KA 174	48	54	~~PMS~~	~~90~~	41	47	39	45	60	66	DNF	90	DNC	90	482	392
66	FRA	Jean-Marie le Guillou	Le Guillou; Lavayer	F 164	79	85	~~PMS~~	~~90~~	56	62	59	65	40	46	52	58	DNF	90	496	406
67	FRA	Sparfel	Sparfel; Huge	F 168	~~77~~	~~83~~	64	70	67	73	65	71	74	80	54	60	55	61	498	415
68	FRA	Lernette	Laigre; Napoleone	F 153	~~75~~	~~81~~	61	67	77	83	66	72	73	79	53	59	56	62	503	420
69	NED	Rien Segaar	Phillip Ruys; Jaap Pels	H 20	68	74	63	69	~~75~~	~~81~~	61	67	72	78	62	68	59	65	502	421
70	GBR	Bell	Lawrence; Page	K 106	70	76	69	75	66	72	63	69	64	70	56	62	~~DNF~~	~~90~~	514	424
71	NED	Bram Soethoudt	Wilco Joosten; Frank Hermans	H 24	76	82	67	73	68	74	~~DNF~~	~~90~~	70	76	55	61	54	60	516	426
72	SUI	Roger Guignard	J.D. Gendre; Bianchin	Z 259	72	78	53	59	59	65	~~DNF~~	~~90~~	71	77	58	64	DNF	90	523	433
73	ESP	Hernandez	David Vera; Boissier	E 181	55	61	50	56	~~PMS~~	~~90~~	PMS	90	PMS	90	42	48	DNF	90	525	435
74	FRA	Lepinay	Lepinay; Chesnay	F 16	73	79	58	64	76	82	~~DNF~~	~~90~~	77	83	57	63	58	64	525	435
75	USA	Stuart H. Walker	Mc Khann; Martin Coffeng	US 725	59	65	38	44	64	70	~~DNF~~	~~90~~	75	81	DSQ	90	DNF	90	530	440
76	FIN	T. Sasaki	Hanheinen; Kurki	L 52	64	70	57	63	58	64	~~DNF~~	~~90~~	65	71	DSQ	90	DNC	90	538	448
77	FRA	Montiriol	Lesage; Patrick Godest	F 150	78	84	65	71	79	85	62	68	69	75	60	66	~~DNS~~	~~90~~	539	449
78	FRA	Yves Steff	Giraudineau; Yannick L'Hellias	F 145	74	80	66	72	74	80	~~DSQ~~	~~90~~	66	72	DSQ	90	53	59	543	453
79	GER	Jörg Hermann	Dieter Meusinger; Ingo Borkowski	G 282	50	56	~~PMS~~	~~90~~	63	69	53	59	DNF	90	DNC	90	DNC	90	544	454
80	FRA	De Pimodan	Sonnet; Blaize	F 139	~~DNS~~	~~90~~	68	74	73	79	DSQ	90	62	68	61	67	DNS	90	558	468
81	FIN	Heikki Hohtari	Joni Nuorivaara; Lindroos	L 50	53	59	62	68	~~PMS~~	~~90~~	DNC	90	DNC	90	DNC	90	DNC	90	577	487
82	FRA	Cormier	Chopier; Lebec	F 149	~~DNS~~	~~90~~	DNS	90	78	84	DNF	90	DNC	90	DNC	90	DNC	90	624	534
83	GER	Michael Beck	Thiem; Waller	G 290	~~DNC~~	~~90~~	DNC	90	DNC	90	DNC	90	DNC	90	DNC	90	DNC	90	630	540

Legend: DNF – Did not finish; DNS – Did not start; DSQ – Disqualified; PMS – Premature start;
Discard is crossed out and does not count for the overall result.

- 1991 Progress

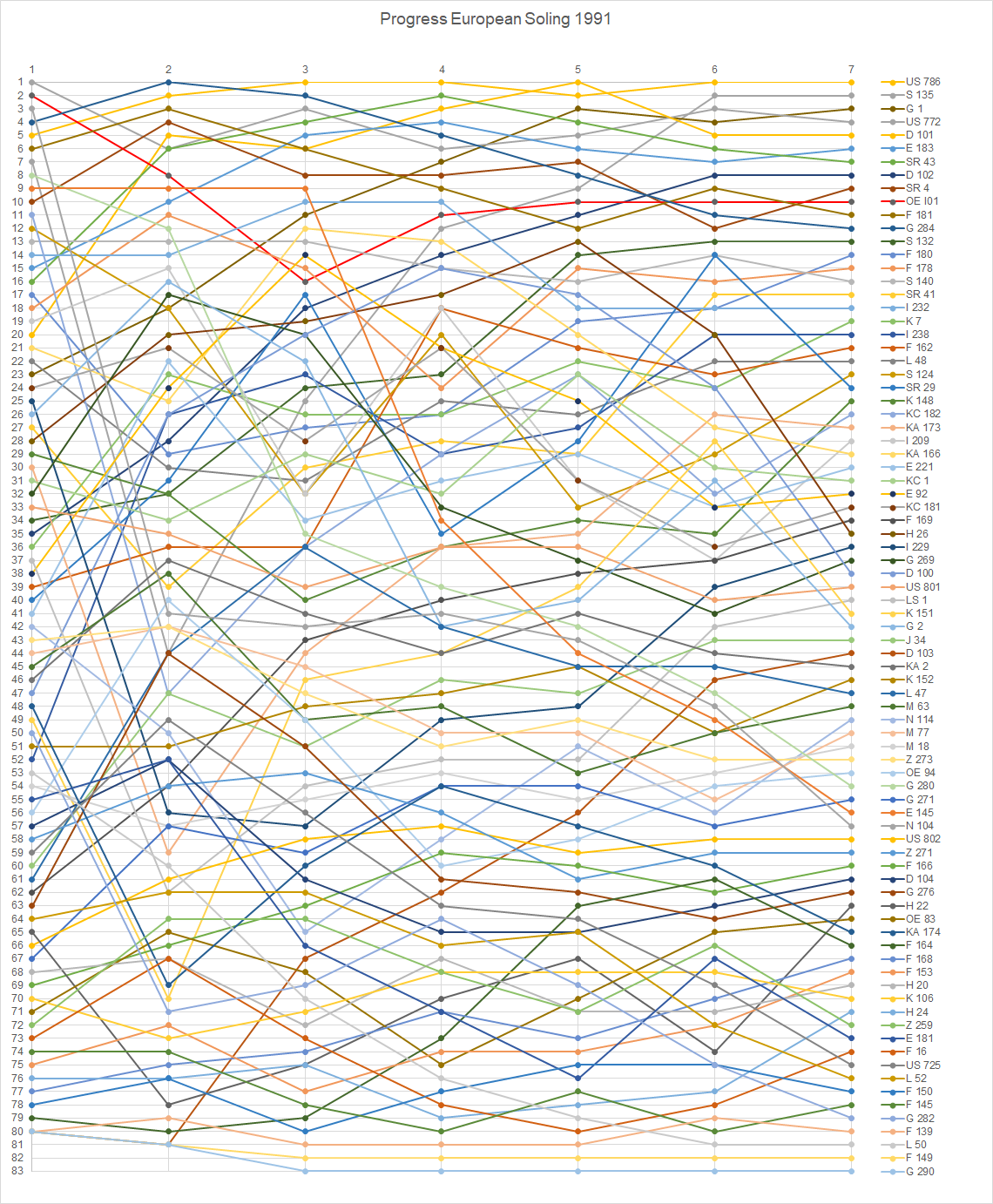

== 1992 Final results ==
1992
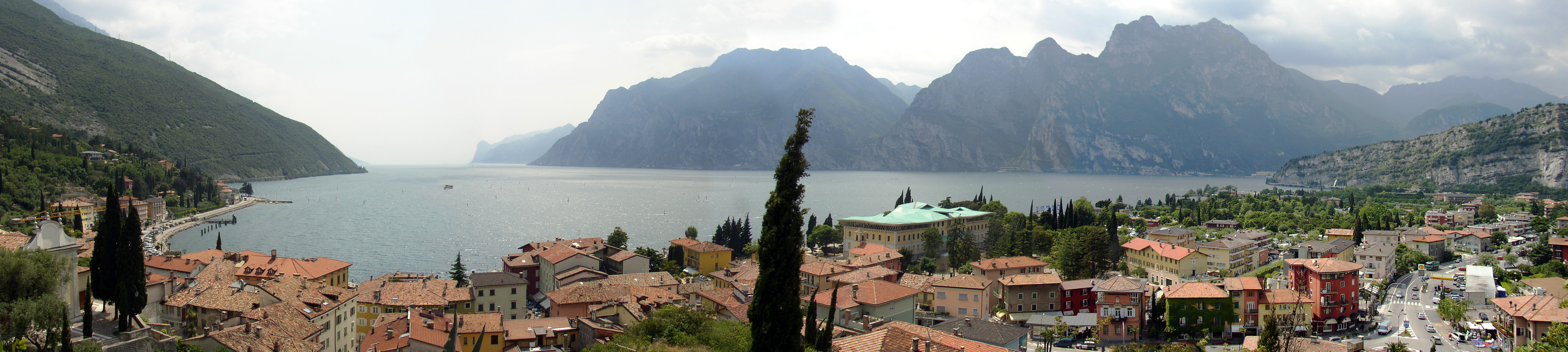

Event title
- Edition: 25
- Host: Circolo Vela Torbole

Event details
- Venue: Torbole, Italy
- Dates: 17–26 September
- Yachts: 45
- Opening ceremony: 19 September

Competitors
- Competitors: 135
- Competing nations: 14

Results
- (gold) Gold: Sweden; Per Åhlby; Stefan Nordström; Jan-Olov Sandberg
- (silver) Silver: Austria; Michael Luschan; Stefan Lindner; Georg Stadler
- (bronze) Bronze: Sweden; Magnus Holmberg; Björn Alm; Johan Barne

Rank	Country	Helmsman	Crew	Sail No.	Race 1		Race 2		Race 3		Race 4		Race 5		Race 6		Race 7		Total	Total – discard
Rank	Country	Helmsman	Crew	Sail No.	Pos.	Pts.	Pos.	Pts.	Pos.	Pts.	Pos.	Pts.	Pos.	Pts.	Pos.	Pts.	Pos.	Pts.	Total	Total – discard
1st place, gold medalist(s)	SWE	Per Åhlby	Stefan Nordström; Jan-Olov Sandberg	S 132	5	10	10	16	1	0	~~DSQ~~	~~52~~	3	5.7	3	5.7	2	3	92.4	40.4
2nd place, silver medalist(s)	AUT	Michael Luschan	Stefan Lindner; Georg Stadler	OE 101	3	5.7	4	8	4	8	3	5.7	~~24~~	~~30~~	6	11.7	4	8	77.1	47.1
3rd place, bronze medalist(s)	SWE	Magnus Holmberg	Björn Alm; Johan Barne	S 135	26	32	12	18	~~PMS~~	~~52~~	1	0	1	0	1	0	1	0	102	50
4	ITA	Flavio Favini	Marco di Natale; Alberto Marelli	I 209	7	13	3	5.7	~~9~~	~~15~~	9	15	2	3	5	10	8	14	75.7	60.7
5	GER	Björn Oestereich	Laurent Scheel; Schuett	G 284	~~12~~	~~18~~	5	10	12	18	10	16	5	10	2	3	3	5.7	80.7	62.7
6	GER	Jörg Hermann	Dieter Meusinger; Ingo Borkowski	G 282	11	17	~~13~~	~~19~~	5	10	4	8	4	8	9	15	6	11.7	88.7	69.7
7	DEN	Theis Palm	Lund; Thomas Kristensen	D 105	14	20	~~DSQ~~	~~52~~	3	5.7	2	3	9	15	4	8	13	19	122.7	70.7
8	ITA	Silvio Santoni	Fabio Toccoli; Cagnoni	I 232	1	0	9	15	2	3	5	10	14	20	18	24	~~19~~	~~25~~	97	72
9	ITA	Mario Celon	Claudio Celon; Sella	I 238	2	3	11	17	14	20	12	18	~~16~~	~~22~~	7	13	5	10	103	81
10	GER	Thomas Jungblut	Heiko Winkler; Neufing	G 289	9	15	7	13	6	11.7	6	11.7	12	18	8	14	~~DNC~~	~~52~~	135.4	83.4
11	DEN	Bo Selko	Moellmann; Kihl	D 103	PMS	52	1	0	~~23~~	~~29~~	7	13	11	17	15	21	15	21	153	101
12	DEN	Niels Jensen	Per Hejstuig; Jan Faurschov	D 104	~~30~~	~~36~~	28	34	8	14	14	20	8	14	10	16	9	15	149	113
13	GER	Andy Vinçon	Thomas Olbrich; Peter Dörsch	G 280	10	16	8	14	~~PMS~~	~~52~~	20	26	13	19	14	20	14	20	167	115
14	HUN	György Wossala	László Kovácsi; Zoltan Sass	M 77	6	11.7	6	11.7	~~PMS~~	~~52~~	16	22	15	21	26	32	21	27	177.4	125.4
15	AUT	Uli Strohschneider	Dominik Würfel; Hannes Steinkogler	OE 73	21	27	2	3	7	13	17	23	20	26	~~30~~	~~36~~	28	34	162	126
16	ITA	Cosentino	Capuano; De Vita	I 239	8	14	20	26	10	16	~~26~~	~~32~~	6	11.7	24	30	24	30	159.7	127.7
17	AUT	Carl Auteried jr.	Martin Kendler; Thomas Beclin	OE 97	13	19	18	24	13	19	13	19	~~29~~	~~35~~	13	19	22	28	163	128
18	AUT	Christian Spießberger	Franz Fellner; Gerhard Schlipfinger	OE 94	18	24	~~DSQ~~	~~52~~	11	17	27	33	10	16	11	17	17	23	182	130
19	GER	Karl Haist	Ingo Hermann; Michael Zachries	G 258	23	29	19	25	~~DSQ~~	~~52~~	23	29	7	13	12	18	12	18	184	132
20	GER	Roman Koch	Maxl Koch; Seibt	G 300	16	22	~~DSQ~~	~~52~~	18	24	22	28	18	24	21	27	7	13	190	138
21	SLO	Bostjan Antoncic	Jerman; Spendal	SLO 1	19	25	14	20	16	22	~~21~~	~~27~~	21	27	16	22	20	26	169	142
22	USA	Joe Hoeksema	Rose Hoeksema; Anderson	US 807	22	28	25	31	15	21	18	24	17	23	~~27~~	~~33~~	11	17	177	144
23	ITA	Marco Rudolfi	Bonsignore; Caputo	I 229	4	8	15	21	~~PMS~~	~~52~~	8	14	DSQ	52	20	26	18	24	197	145
24	GER	Axel Mertens	Diezmann; Hans Schultz	G 269	~~28~~	~~34~~	26	32	19	25	11	17	23	29	19	25	16	22	184	150
25	GRE	Chrysikos	Bizios; Handakas	GR 31	33	39	~~DSQ~~	~~52~~	17	23	15	21	25	31	17	23	10	16	205	153
26	SUI	D. Schenker	C. Schenker; Sailor	Z 271	15	21	21	27	21	27	~~24~~	~~30~~	22	28	22	28	23	29	190	160
27	GER	Knebel	Prinz; Hirschfeld	G 257	20	26	24	30	25	31	19	25	~~33~~	~~39~~	31	37	27	33	221	182
28	AUT	Gustav Kuhn	Stefan Buchberger; Georg Zeileis	OE 32	34	40	16	22	22	28	28	34	26	32	~~41~~	~~47~~	26	32	235	188
29	GER	Michael Beck	Karsten Meyer; Ziems	G290	24	30	17	23	~~DSQ~~	~~52~~	29	35	19	25	23	29	DNS	52	246	194
30	FRA	Montiriol	Rousseau; Oueant	F 150	17	23	22	28	33	39	~~DSQ~~	~~52~~	27	33	32	38	35	41	254	202
31	AUT	Christian Feichtinger	Volker Moser; Udo Moser	OE 63	25	31	27	33	27	33	30	36	30	36	28	34	~~DNC~~	~~52~~	255	203
32	NOR	Ugland	Helge; Hermann	N 111	41	47	29	35	~~DSQ~~	~~52~~	25	31	32	38	33	39	29	35	277	225
33	ITA	Veronesi	Veronesi; Pravezzi	I 187	27	33	31	37	24	30	~~DSQ~~	~~52~~	36	42	38	44	34	40	278	226
34	ITA	Bruno Maffezzoli	Pierfrancesco Maffezzoli; Marco Maffezzoli	I 203	~~38~~	~~44~~	33	39	31	37	34	40	35	41	29	35	30	36	272	228
35	FRA	Yves Steff	Bolo; Gaultier	F 145	31	37	DSQ	5	32	38	DSQ	52	28	34	25	31	32	38	282	230
36	ITA	Taglietti	Taglietti; Fiammetti	I 226	32	38	36	42	28	34	32	38	~~39~~	~~45~~	35	41	31	37	275	230
37	NED	Bram Soethoudt	Camiel Volmer; Wilco Joosten	H 24	35	41	34	40	26	32	36	42	~~40~~	~~46~~	39	45	25	31	277	231
38	ITA	Camerlengo	Montresor; Carletto	I 199	~~RET~~	~~52~~	30	36	20	26	33	39	38	44	34	40	DSQ	52	289	237
39	FRA	Nouvelion	Gitles; Court	F 188	36	42	32	38	34	40	~~37~~	~~43~~	31	37	36	42	37	43	285	242
40	SUI	Escher	Kielholtz; Egli	Z 259	39	45	23	29	30	36	31	37	~~DSQ~~	~~52~~	40	46	DNS	52	297	245
41	ITA	Manzan	Barbarossa; Zimola	I 154	29	35	~~DSQ~~	~~52~~	29	35	35	41	41	47	37	43	DNS	52	305	253
42	AUT	Ernst Zeibig	Martin Stempkowski; Leonhard	OE 85	37	43	37	43	~~DSQ~~	~~52~~	38	44	37	43	42	48	33	39	312	260
43	GBR	Alan Holmes	Bennett; Riley	K 149	42	48	38	44	35	41	39	45	34	40	~~43~~	~~49~~	36	42	309	260
44	ITA	Piolatto	Piolatto; Rinaldi	I 212	40	46	35	41	~~DNC~~	~~52~~	DNC	52	DNS	52	RET	52	38	44	339	287
45	HUN	G. Bankuty	Nomen nescio	M 12	~~DNC~~	~~52~~	DNC	52	DNC	52	DNC	52	DNC	52	DNC	52	DNC	52	364	312

Legend: DNC – Did not come to the starting area; DNF – Did not finish; DNS – Did not start; DSQ – Disqualified; PMS – Premature start; RET – Retired;
Discard is crossed out and does not count for the overall result.

- 1992 Progress

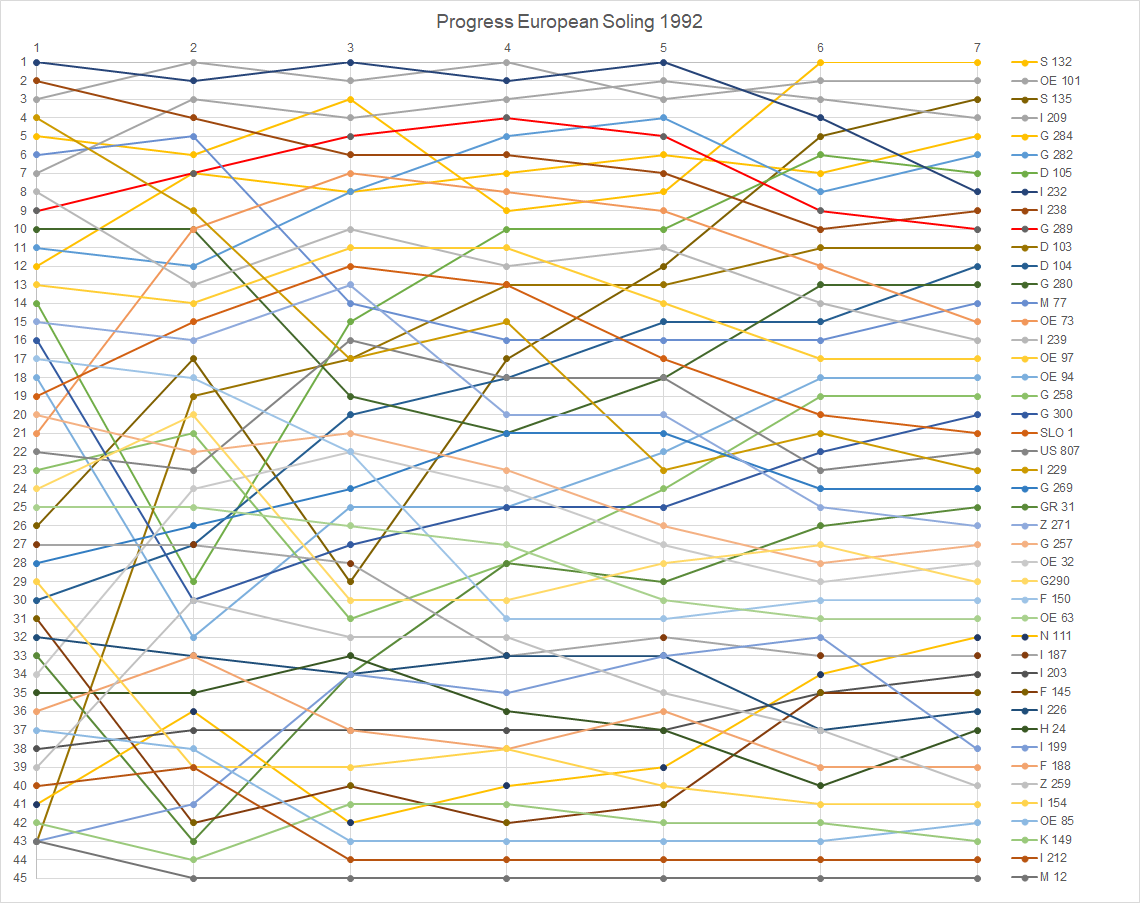

== 1993 Final results ==
1993
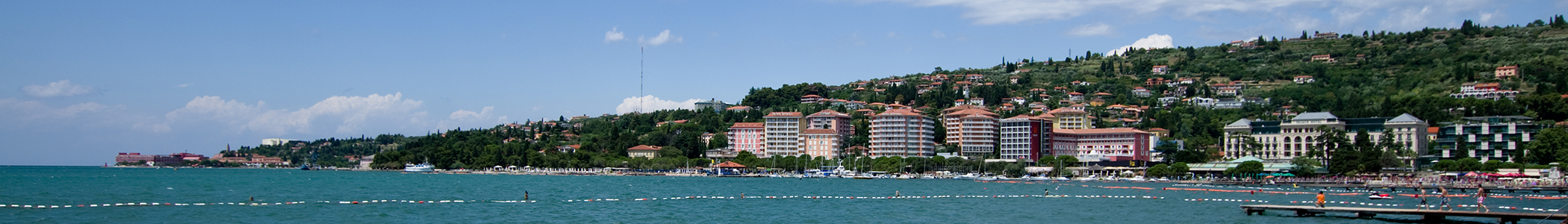

Event title
- Edition: 26
- Host: Portorož Yacht Club

Event details
- Venue: Portorož, Slovenia
- Dates: 5–12 June
- Yachts: 39
- Key people: David Antončič
- Opening ceremony: 5 June

Competitors
- Competitors: 117
- Competing nations: 13

Results
- (gold) Gold: Germany; Jochen Schümann; Thomas Flach; Bernd Jäkel
- (silver) Silver: Germany; Albert Batzill; Peter Lang; Eddy Eich
- (bronze) Bronze: Norway; Rune Jacobsen; Erling Landsværk; Thom Haaland

Rank	Country	Helmsman	Crew	Sail No.	Race 1		Race 2		Race 3		Race 4		Race 5		Race 6		Race 7		Total	Total – discard
Rank	Country	Helmsman	Crew	Sail No.	Pos.	Pts.	Pos.	Pts.	Pos.	Pts.	Pos.	Pts.	Pos.	Pts.	Pos.	Pts.	Pos.	Pts.	Total	Total – discard
1st place, gold medalist(s)	GER	Jochen Schümann	Thomas Flach; Bernd Jäkel	G 287	2	3	2	3	1	0	5	10	1	0	3	5.7	~~DNC~~	~~46~~	67.7	21.7
2nd place, silver medalist(s)	GER	Albert Batzill	Peter Lang; Eddy Eich	G 286	3	5.7	10	16	3	5.7	1	0	~~13~~	~~19~~	2	3	3	5.7	55.1	36.1
3rd place, bronze medalist(s)	NOR	Rune Jacobsen	Erling Landsværk; Thom Haaland	N 100	~~20~~	~~26~~	1	0	2	3	3	5.7	5	10	19	25	4	8	77.7	51.7
4	SWE	Magnus Holmberg	Johan Barne; Björn Alm	S 135	~~28~~	~~34~~	3	5.7	6	11.7	2	3	6	11.7	15	21	2	3	90.1	56.1
5	AUT	Michael Luschan	Georg Stadler; Markus Schneeberger	OE 101	~~22~~	~~28~~	6	11.7	15	21	12	18	8	14	1	0	1	0	92.7	64.7
6	SWE	Per Åhlby	Stefan Nordström; Jan-Olov Sandberg	S 196	6	11.7	~~15~~	~~21~~	4	8	6	11.7	7	13	9	15	7	13	93.4	72.4
7	NED	Willem Potma	Gerhard Potma; Peter Burggraaff	H 26	5	10	8	14	16	22	4	8	2	3	~~22~~	~~28~~	11	17	102	74
8	ITA	Mario Celon	Claudio Celon; A. Sommariva	I 241	1	0	3	5.7	5	10	9	15	20	26	12	18	~~DNF~~	~~46~~	120.7	74.7
9	HUN	Szabolcs Detre	Zsolt Detre; Gábor Meretei	M 107	15	21	5	10	~~PMS~~	~~46~~	10	16	10	16	7	13	5	10	132	86
10	ITA	Giova Arrivabene	Fabio Toccoli; Cagnoni	I 232	21	27	7	13	8	14	8	14	4	8	18	24	~~DNF~~	~~46~~	146	100
11	ITA	Gianfranco	Zlatich; Walter Marino	I 223	11	17	9	15	9	15	11	17	3	5.7	~~20~~	~~26~~	14	20	115.7	89.7
12	GER	Markus Wieser	Neuling; Ingo Borkowski	G 289	10	16	4	8	12	18	13	19	11	17	8	14	~~DNF~~	~~46~~	138	92
13	ITA	Marco Rodolfi	Bonsignore; Fabini	I 229	~~26~~	~~32~~	14	20	7	13	7	13	16	22	5	10	12	18	128	96
14	SWE	Bjorndal	Anders Liljeblad; Nilsson	S 142	~~24~~	~~30~~	13	19	20	26	17	23	14	20	6	11.7	9	15	144.7	114.7
15	HUN	Bankuff	Koles; Károly Vezér	M 101	12	18	16	22	18	24	22	28	~~31~~	~~37~~	4	8	18	24	161	124
16	GER	Jörg Hermann	Dieter Meusinger; Heiko Winkler	G 282	4	8	~~23~~	~~29~~	14	20	23	29	23	29	13	19	13	19	153	124
17	GER	Axel Mertens	Pieper; Oehler	G 296	9	15	~~PMS~~	~~46~~	10	16	18	24	17	23	23	29	16	22	175	129
18	DEN	Theis Palm	Vildenfeldt; Thomas Kristensen	D 105	17	23	17	23	19	25	19	25	~~21~~	~~27~~	17	23	6	11.7	157.7	130.7
19	DEN	Bo Selko	Kihl; Mollmann	D 103	14	20	11	17	~~27~~	~~33~~	27	33	15	21	10	16	19	25	165	132
20	BLR	Oleg Spolon	Gennadiy Strakh; Oleg Miron	BLR 1	7	13	20	26	~~PMS~~	~~46~~	14	20	22	28	27	33	8	14	180	134
21	HUN	György Wossala	László Kovácsi; Zotlan Sass	M 77	8	14	12	18	17	23	21	27	18	24	~~24~~	~~30~~	23	29	165	135
22	GER	Roman Koch	Markus Wieser; Schrappe	G 300	13	19	22	28	11	17	16	22	26	32	~~28~~	~~34~~	20	26	178	144
23	DEN	Niels Jensen	Larsen; Solund	D 104	18	24	~~PMS~~	~~46~~	PMS	46	26	32	9	15	11	17	15	21	201	155
24	ITA	Pierluigi Fornelli	Sbrana; Di Capua	I 239	~~25~~	~~31~~	25	31	30	36	15	21	12	18	29	35	17	23	195	159
25	ITA	Vascotto	Fioretto; Rizzi	I 240	16	22	~~29~~	~~35~~	26	32	28	34	19	25	14	20	22	28	196	161
26	USA	Charlie Kamps	Rose Hoeksema; Joe Hoeksema	US 802	30	36	18	24	13	19	24	30	25	31	~~31~~	~~37~~	28	34	211	174
27	AUT	Uli Strohschneider	Dominik Würfel; Hannes Stadler	OE 73	~~32~~	~~38~~	21	27	21	27	20	26	24	30	25	31	30	36	215	177
28	AUT	Franz Wageneder	Georg Zeileis; Reinhard Födinger	OE 32	23	29	27	33	~~PMS~~	~~46~~	31	37	27	33	21	27	21	27	232	186
29	SLO	Bostjan Antoncic	Jerman; Spendal	SLO 1	27	33	24	30	25	31	25	31	30	36	~~32~~	~~38~~	26	32	231	193
30	ITA	Manzan	Barbarossa; Zimolo	I 154	19	25	19	25	23	29	34	40	34	40	35	41	~~DNF~~	~~46~~	246	200
31	AUT	Christian Feightinger	Volker Moser; Udo Moser	OE 83	31	37	~~32~~	~~38~~	22	28	35	41	36	42	16	22	29	35	243	201
32	NED	Bram Soethoudt	Frank Hermans; Jaap de Zeeuw	H 24	34	40	28	34	31	37	30	36	~~32~~	~~38~~	26	32	24	30	247	207
33	GER	Forschner	Braun; Forschner	G 234	29	35	26	32	29	35	29	35	29	35	30	36	~~32~~	~~38~~	246	208
34	ITA	Veronesi	Meoni; Bazzoli	I 187	35	41	31	37	28	34	33	39	28	34	~~38~~	~~44~~	25	31	260	216
35	FRA	Nouvellon	Quentin; Rousseau	F 188	~~36~~	~~42~~	30	36	32	38	32	38	33	39	34	40	31	37	270	228
36	GER	Hugo Kriebel	Ismer; Hirschfield	G 257	33	39	36	42	33	39	~~37~~	~~43~~	35	41	33	39	27	33	276	233
37	ITA	Catellacci	Massacesi; Zummo	I 210	39	45	33	39	24	30	36	42	~~DNF~~	~~46~~	37	43	33	39	284	238
38	GBR	Alan Holmes	Babink; Ibbotson	K 149	37	43	35	41	34	40	38	44	37	43	~~39~~	~~45~~	34	40	296	251
39	SLO	David Antončič	Plannisek; Piesko	SL0 2	38	44	34	40	35	41	~~39~~	~~45~~	38	44	36	42	35	41	297	252

Legend: DNC – Did not come to the starting area; DNF – Did not finish; PMS – Premature start;
Discard is crossed out and does not count for the overall result.

- 1993 Progress

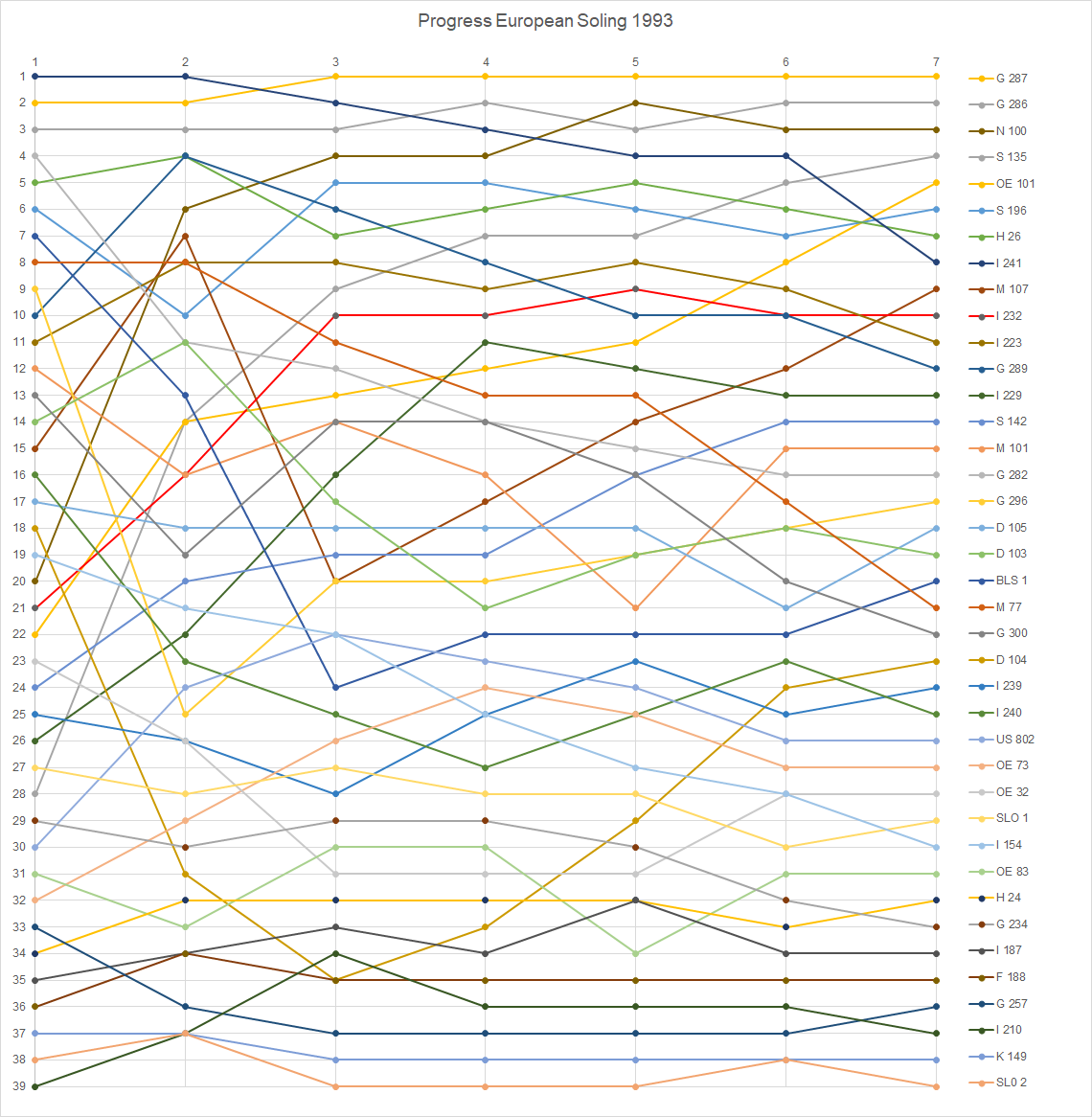

== 1994 Final results ==
1994
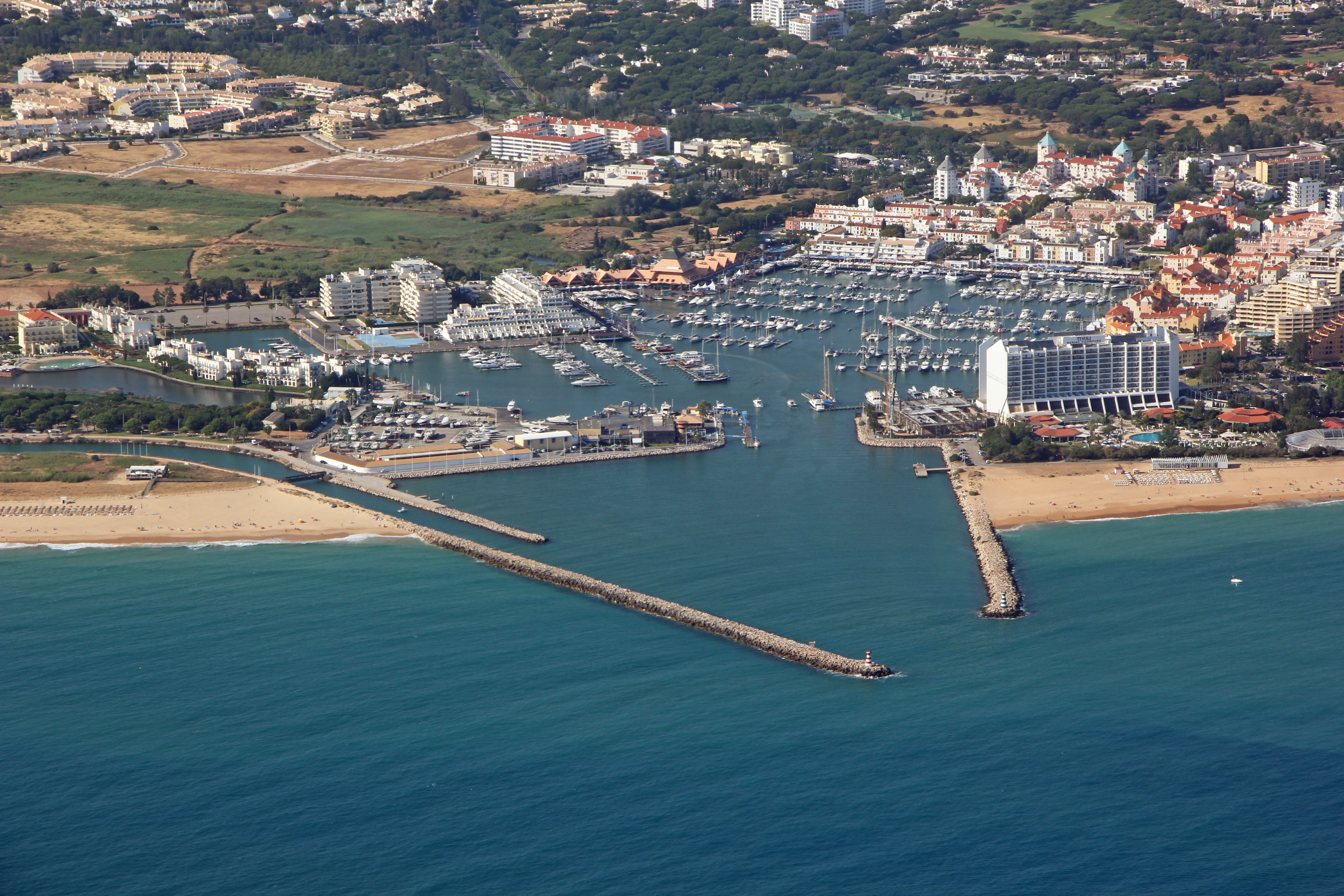

Event title
- Edition: 27
- Host: Clube Internacional da Marina de Vilamoura

Event details
- Venue: Vilamoura, Portugal
- Dates: 17–23 September
- Yachts: 32
- Opening ceremony: 16 September

Competitors
- Competitors: 96
- Competing nations: 16

Results
- (gold) Gold: Germany; Jochen Schümann; Thomas Flach; Bernd Jäkel
- (silver) Silver: Denmark; Stig Westergaard; Jan Eli Andersen; Jens Bojsen-Møller
- (bronze) Bronze: Australia; Ian Walker; Michael Peel; Stephan Jackson

Rank	Country	Helmsman	Crew	Sail No.	Race 1		Race 2		Race 3		Race 4		Race 5		Race 6		Race 7		Total	Total – discard
Rank	Country	Helmsman	Crew	Sail No.	Pos.	Pts.	Pos.	Pts.	Pos.	Pts.	Pos.	Pts.	Pos.	Pts.	Pos.	Pts.	Pos.	Pts.	Total	Total – discard
1st place, gold medalist(s)	GER	Jochen Schümann	Thomas Flach; Bernd Jäkel	GER 287	2	3	4	8	1	0	2	3	2	3	2	3	~~DNC~~	~~46~~	66	20
2nd place, silver medalist(s)	DEN	Stig Westergaard	Jan Eli Andersen; Jens Bojsen-Møller	DEN 111	15	21	6	11.7	3	5.7	1	0	1	0	3	5.7	~~DNC~~	~~46~~	90.1	44.1
3rd place, bronze medalist(s)	AUS	Ian Walker	Michael Peel; Stephan Jackson	AUS 177	3	5.7	8	14	~~18~~	~~24~~	9	15	9	15	1	0	1	0	73.7	49.7
4	ITA	Mario Celon	Claudio Celon; Gianni Torboli	ITA 241	1	0	9	15	8	14	6	11.7	5	10	~~12~~	~~18~~	5	10	78.7	60.7
5	ESP	Luis Doreste	Domingo Manrique; David Vera	ESP 183	10	16	5	10	4	8	5	10	3	5.7	10	16	~~11~~	~~17~~	82.7	65.7
6	DEN	Theis Palm	Henrik Vildenpeldt; Thomas Kristensen	DEN 110	4	8	7	13	2	3	12	18	~~14~~	~~20~~	6	11.7	8	14	87.7	67.7
7	NED	Willem Potma	Gerhard Potma; Frank Hettinga	NED 31	~~12~~	~~18~~	1	0	10	16	7	13	11	17	5	10	7	13	87	69
8	NOR	Herman Horn Johannessen	Paul Davis; Espen Stokkeland	NOR 116	~~16~~	~~22~~	3	5.7	5	10	3	5.7	6	11.7	13	19	13	19	93.1	71.1
9	GBR	Stuart Childerley	Peter Warren; Tim Hancock	GBR 66	7	13	18	24	~~25~~	~~31~~	4	8	4	8	9	15	3	5.7	104.7	73.7
10	FRA	Yves Loday	Peuch; Audigane	FRA 182	17	23	2	3	6	11.7	15	21	13	19	8	14	~~OCS~~	~~46~~	137.7	91.7
11	DEN	Mads Storgaard	Morten Storgaard; Jan Faurschov	DEN 102	~~20~~	~~26~~	15	21	15	21	14	20	7	13	4	8	6	11.7	120.7	94.7
12	SWE	Per Petterson	Nicklas Friden; Martin Westerdahl	SWE 155	~~26~~	~~32~~	13	19	9	15	10	16	16	22	14	20	4	8	132	100
13	IRL	Marshall King	Garrett Connolly; Dan O'Grady	IRL 2	18	24	10	16	11	17	~~20~~	~~26~~	12	18	11	17	12	18	136	110
14	GER	Helmar Nauck	Roman Koch; Maxl Koch	GER 300	30	36	17	23	7	13	8	14	8	14	~~DSQ~~	~~46~~	14	20	166	120
15	SWE	Magnus Johansson	Nicklas Holm; Christian Strombald	SWE 196	RDG	21	RDG	21	12	18	16	22	19	25	~~20~~	~~26~~	10	16	149	123
16	ITA	Pierluigi Fornelli	Sbrana; Dicapua	ITA 239	6	11.7	~~24~~	~~30~~	17	23	21	27	15	21	21	27	9	15	154.7	124.7
17	SUI	Jan Eckert	Piet Eckert; Wim Eckert	SUI 274	14	20	~~28~~	~~34~~	14	20	11	17	23	29	15	21	15	21	162	128
18	GER	Albert Batzill	Peter Lang; Eddy Eich	GER 286	27	33	14	20	22	28	~~OCS~~	~~46~~	27	33	7	13	2	3	176	130
19	HUN	György Wossala	László Kovácsi; Károly Vezér	HUN 77	5	10	12	18	20	26	26	32	10	16	~~28~~	~~34~~	24	30	166	132
20	ITA	Angelotti	Nomen nescio	ITA 194	8	14	~~30~~	~~36~~	23	29	18	24	18	24	17	23	22	28	178	142
21	GBR	Richard Merriweather	Mark Parker; Nick Parker	GBR 155	19	25	11	17	~~26~~	~~32~~	22	28	17	23	25	31	23	29	185	153
22	NED	Rudy den Outer	Leo Determan; Martijn Romer	NED 22	11	17	29	35	~~30~~	~~36~~	19	25	22	28	19	25	18	24	190	154
23	GBR	Pinnell	Darling; Hancock	GBR 143	9	15	23	29	19	25	~~OCS~~	~~46~~	20	26	23	29	25	31	201	155
24	GER	Andy Vinçon	Peter Dörsch; Götz	GER 298	13	19	27	33	24	30	~~27~~	~~33~~	21	27	18	24	16	22	188	155
25	GER	Erich Hirt Jr.	Nomen Nescio	GER 275	~~25~~	~~31~~	20	26	16	22	17	23	26	32	22	28	21	27	189	157
26	NED	Bram Soethoudt	Wilco Joosten; Frank Hermans	NED 24	21	27	16	22	21	27	25	31	25	31	~~29~~	~~35~~	20	26	199	164
27	ESP	Xavier	Nomen Nescio	ESP 11	24	30	25	31	13	19	~~29~~	~~35~~	29	35	27	33	17	23	206	171
28	POR	Carlos Madeira	Hugo Batalha de Almeida; Filipe Silva	POR 4	23	29	19	25	27	33	~~30~~	~~36~~	24	30	16	22	26	32	207	171
29	RSA	Carkeek	Nomen Nescio	RSA 1	22	28	21	27	28	34	13	19	~~DNC~~	~~46~~	DNC	46	19	25	225	179
30	FRA	Nouvellon	Nomen Nescio	FRA 170	28	34	22	28	~~29~~	~~35~~	24	30	28	34	26	32	27	33	226	191
31	USA	Richard Grunsten	Nomen Nescio	USA 815	29	35	26	32	~~31~~	~~37~~	23	29	30	36	24	30	28	34	233	196
32	GBR	Alan Holmes	Nomen Nescio	GBR 149	31	37	31	37	~~32~~	~~38~~	28	34	31	37	30	36	29	35	254	216

Legend: DNC – Did not come to the starting area; DNF – Did not finish; PMS – Premature start;
Discard is crossed out and does not count for the overall result.

- 1994 Progress

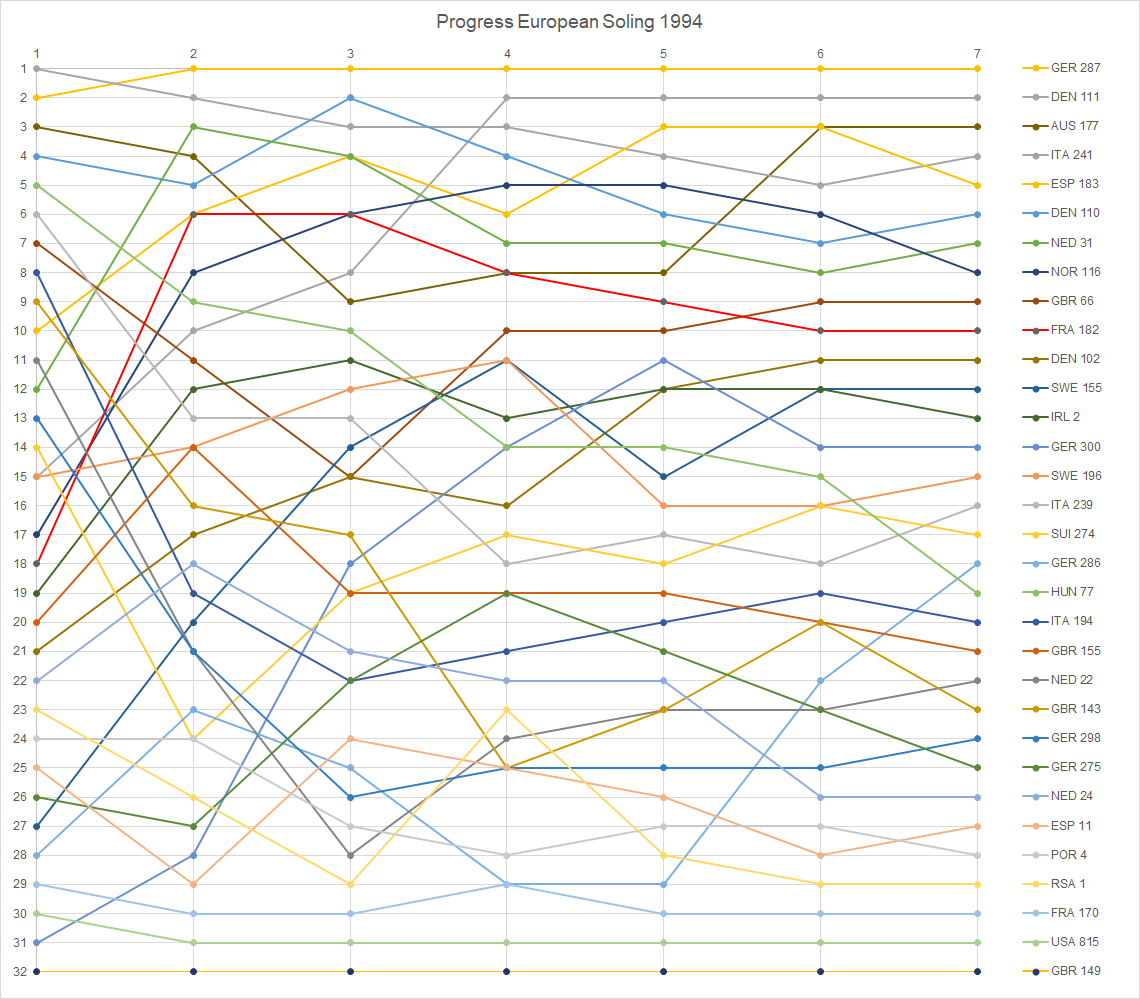

== Further results ==
For further results see:

- Soling European Championship results (1968–1979)
- Soling European Championship results (1980–1984)
- Soling European Championship results (1985–1989)
- Soling European Championship results (1990–1994)
- Soling European Championship results (1995–1999)
- Soling European Championship results (2000–2004)
- Soling European Championship results (2005–2009)
- Soling European Championship results (2010–2014)
- Soling European Championship results (2015–2019)
- Soling European Championship results (2020–2024)
