= Soling World Championship results (1990–1994) =

Soling
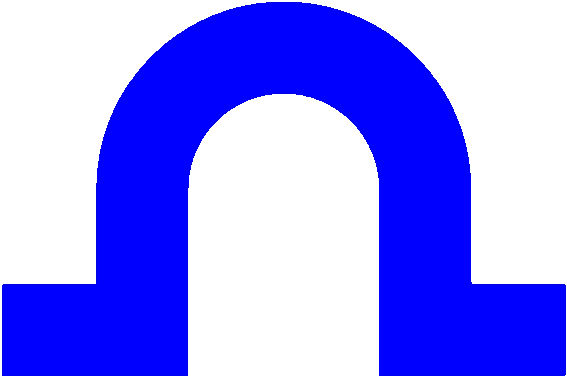

Development
- Name: Soling

This article stated the results of the World Soling Championships from 1990 till 1994. Unfortunately not all crew names are documented in the major sources: United States Soling Association (USSA) bulletin "Leading Edge" and International Soling Association (ISA) magazine "Soling Sailing".

== 1990 Final results ==
1990
Event title
- Edition: 23
- Host: Royal Yacht Club Hollandia

Event details
- Venue: Medemblik, Netherlands
- Dates: 16 -26 August
- Yachts: 66
- Opening ceremony: 19 August

Competitors
- Competitors: 198
- Competing nations: 24

Results
- (gold) Gold: France; Marc Bouet; Fabrice Levet; Alain Pointet
- (silver) Silver: United States; Kevin Mahaney; Jim Brady; Doug Kern
- (bronze) Bronze: East Germany; Helmar Nauck; Norbert Hellriegel; Sven Diedering

Rank	Country	Helmsman	Crew	Sail No.	Race 1		Race 2		Race 3		Race 4		Race 5		Race 6		Race 7		Total	Total – discard
Rank	Country	Helmsman	Crew	Sail No.	Pos.	Pts.	Pos.	Pts.	Pos.	Pts.	Pos.	Pts.	Pos.	Pts.	Pos.	Pts.	Pos.	Pts.	Total	Total – discard
1st place, gold medalist(s)	FRA	Marc Bouet	Fabrice Levet; Alain Pointet	F 181	6	11.7	~~49~~	~~55.0~~	6	11.7	1	0.0	2	3.0	1	0.0	14	20.0	101.4	46.4
2nd place, silver medalist(s)	USA	Kevin Mahaney	Jim Brady; Doug Kern	US 787	1	0.0	4	8.0	5	10.0	3	5.7	~~15~~	~~21.0~~	14	20.0	2	3.0	67.7	46.7
3rd place, bronze medalist(s)	GDR	Helmar Nauck	Norbert Hellriegel; Sven Diedering	DDR 4	7	13.0	~~17~~	~~23.0~~	2	3.0	8	14.0	8	14.0	7	13.0	4	8.0	88.0	65.0
4	USA	Dave Curtis	Brad Dellenbaugh; Paul Murphy	US 786	2	3.0	7	13.0	4	8.0	19	25.0	5	10.0	~~29~~	~~35.0~~	6	11.7	105.7	70.7
5	ESP	Fernando León	HRH Felipe de Borbon; Alfredo Vázquez	E 183	~~24~~	~~30.0~~	11	17.0	10	16.0	4	8.0	13	19.0	9	15.0	5	10.0	115.0	85.0
6	CAN	Hans Fogh	Steve Calder; Toby Tarczky	KC 181	3	5.7	12	18.0	8	14.0	11	17.0	12	18.0	~~35~~	~~41.0~~	9	15.0	128.7	87.7
7	DEN	Jesper Bank	Jesper Seier; Steen Secher	D 92	9	15.0	10	16.0	16	22.0	~~43~~	~~49.0~~	1	0.0	4	8.0	23	29.0	139.0	90.0
8	NZL	Russell Coutts	Graeme Fleury; John Irvine	KZ 20	11	17.0	YMP	17.6	~~24~~	~~30.0~~	7	13.0	3	5.7	15	21.0	12	18.0	204.7	92.3
9	NED	Roy Heiner	Ed van der Steene; Niels Unger	H 26	12	18.0	~~19~~	~~25.0~~	15	21.0	6	11.7	7	13.0	5	10.0	19	25.0	123.7	98.7
10	GDR	Jochen Schümann	Thomas Flach; Bernd Jäkel	DDR 1	4	8.0	1	0.0	18	24.0	21	27.0	18	24.0	10	16.0	~~PMS~~	~~73.0~~	172.0	99.0
11	DEN	Morten Hendriksen	Per Anderson; Jan Anderson	D 96	16	22.0	3	5.7	14	20.0	~~37~~	~~43.0~~	22	28.0	8	14.0	7	13.0	145.7	102.7
12	CAN	Paul Thomson	Philip Gow; Stuart Flinn	KC 182	13	19.0	8	14.0	3	5.7	~~36~~	~~42.0~~	23	29.0	17	23.0	11	17.0	149.7	107.7
13	GDR	Björn Oestereich	Laurent Scheel; Steffen Voigt	DDR 3	18	24.0	2	3.0	32	38.0	18	24.0	11	17.0	2	3.0	~~PMS~~	~~73.0~~	182.0	109.0
14	SWE	Magnus Holmberg	Johan Barne; Björn Alm	S 135	10	16.0	14	20.0	9	15.0	10	16.0	14	20.0	21	27.0	~~PMS~~	~~73.0~~	187.0	114.0
15	CAN	Bill Abbott Jr.	Matt Abbott; Charlie Day	KC 1	26	32.0	35	41.0	~~37~~	~~43.0~~	15	21.0	6	11.7	11	17.0	1	0.0	165.7	122.7
16	FRG	Thomas Jungblut	Gerrit Bartel; Frank Neufing	G 269	15	21.0	21	27.0	30	36.0	2	3.0	~~38~~	~~44.0~~	31	37.0	15	21.0	189.0	145.0
17	GDR	Jörg Hermann	Ingo Hermann; Ingo Borowski	DDR 5	~~31~~	~~37.0~~	25	31.0	26	32.0	24	30.0	10	16.0	22	28.0	8	14.0	188.0	151.0
18	ITA	Marco Rudolfi	Guiseppe De Martino; Faffo Lotti	I 229	47	53.0	~~DNF~~	~~73.0~~	19	25.0	33	39.0	9	15.0	3	5.7	10	16.0	226.7	153.7
19	ITA	Flavio Favini	Marco di Natale; Alberto Marelli	I 209	29	35.0	22	28.0	~~PMS~~	~~73.0~~	9	15.0	34	40.0	6	11.7	20	26.0	228.7	155.7
20	AUT	Michael Luschan	Georg Stadler; Franz Fellner	0E 73	21	27.0	6	11.7	~~44~~	~~50.0~~	20	26.0	16	22.0	25	31.0	33	39.0	206.7	156.7
21	FRA	Luc Pillot	Alain Champy; Yannig Livory	F 150	23	29.0	20	26.0	43	49.0	~~DSQ~~	~~73.0~~	30	36.0	12	18.0	3	5.7	236.7	163.7
22	AUS	William Hodder	Chris Mason; Michael Mottle	KA 172	8	14.0	~~DSQ~~	~~73.0~~	31	37.0	35	41.0	4	8.0	30	36.0	22	28.0	237.0	164.0
23	GBR	Glen Charles	Robert Cruickshank; Tim Hancock	K 151	22	28.0	9	15.0	23	29.0	~~56~~	~~62.0~~	36	42.0	18	24.0	26	32.0	232.0	170.0
24	AUS	Matt Hayes	Andrew Cutler; Douglas Ross-Munro	KA 152	30	36.0	28	34.0	21	27.0	~~44~~	~~50.0~~	19	25.0	23	29.0	17	23.0	224.0	174.0
25	FRA	Thierry Peponnet	Daniel Ferre; Gildas Morvan	F 188	17	23.0	34	40.0	~~PMS~~	~~73.0~~	29	35.0	42	48.0	13	19.0	13	19.0	257.0	184.0
26	URS	Serhiy Pichuhin	Gennadiy Strakh; Andrey Nikandrov	SR 41	20	26.0	5	10.0	~~PMS~~	~~73.0~~	49	55.0	27	33.0	20	26.0	29	35.0	258.0	185.0
27	FIN	Kenneth Thelen	Hendrik Thelen; Joha Valtanen	L 48	19	25.0	29	35.0	29	35.0	~~39~~	~~45.0~~	25	31.0	16	22.0	36	42.0	235.0	190.0
28	JPN	Kazunori Komatsu	Toshiaka Motohashi; Hideaki Takashiro	J 34	36	42.0	33	39.0	12	18.0	5	10.0	~~DNS~~	~~73.0~~	59	65.0	18	24.0	271.0	198.0
29	NOR	Terje Wang	Erling Landsværk; Tom Eslungsen	N 107	5	10.0	~~41~~	~~47.0~~	33	39.0	34	40.0	41	47.0	19	25.0	32	38.0	246.0	199.0
30	SWE	Martin Palson	Gran Alm; Lars Holmquist	S 140	25	31.0	15	21.0	~~53~~	~~59.0~~	22	28.0	37	43.0	49	55.0	16	22.0	259.0	200.0
31	GBR	David Tabb	Martin Borrett; William Watson	K 148	~~RET~~	~~73.0~~	24	30.0	1	0.0	13	19.0	32	38.0	36	42.0	PMS	73.0	275.0	202.0
32	URS	Tõnu Tõniste	Heiki Tauts; Tiit Vikson	SR 29	YMP	39.0	31	37.0	41	47.0	17	23.0	21	27.0	~~44~~	~~50.0~~	24	30.0	314.0	203.0
33	FRA	Francois Brenac	Stanislas Bripaux; Jules Mazars	F 162	33	39.0	26	32.0	28	34.0	30	36.0	~~57~~	~~63.0~~	28	34.0	38	44.0	282.0	219.0
34	FRG	Axel Mertens	Michael Dümchen; Rene Schmitt	G 276	43	49.0	43	49.0	20	26.0	26	32.0	~~DSQ~~	~~73.0~~	26	32.0	27	33.0	294.0	221.0
35	NOR	Rune Jacobsen	Anders Andersen; Pai Christoffersen	N 104	50	56.0	30	36.0	11	17.0	32	38.0	17	23.0	52	58.0	~~PMS~~	~~73.0~~	301.0	228.0
36	AUS	James Wilmot	David Hardy; Warwick Anderson	KA 169	~~DSQ~~	~~73.0~~	16	22.0	13	19.0	PMS	73.0	33	39.0	42	48.0	21	27.0	301.0	228.0
37	HUN	Szabolcs Detre	Zsolt Detre; Zoltan Sass	M 63	37	43.0	47	53.0	7	13.0	12	18.0	24	30.0	~~PMS~~	~~73.0~~	PMS	73.0	303.0	230.0
38	GBR	Rory Bowman	Mark Ingram; Mark Covell	K 147	28	34.0	36	42.0	42	48.0	27	33.0	~~58~~	~~64.0~~	27	33.0	37	43.0	297.0	233.0
39	ISR	Yoel Sela	Eldad Amir; Jehuda Mayan	IS 11	39	45.0	27	33.0	34	40.0	38	44.0	26	32.0	~~60~~	~~66.0~~	40	46.0	306.0	240.0
40	NOR	Dag Usterud	Eilert Vierli; Kristian Krogholm	N 111	32	38.0	13	19.0	~~55~~	~~61.0~~	47	53.0	20	26.0	53	59.0	42	48.0	304.0	243.0
41	FRG	Andy Vincon	Thomas Olbrich; Peter Dörsch	G 280	14	20.0	42	48.0	~~PMS~~	~~73.0~~	25	31.0	40	46.0	24	30.0	DSQ	73.0	321.0	248.0
42	USA	Erik Koppernaes	Colin Guthrie; Paul Jrabowsky	US 806	40	46.0	45	51.0	~~PMS~~	~~73.0~~	31	37.0	29	35.0	48	54.0	25	31.0	327.0	254.0
43	SWE	Peter Carlsson	Otto Stroemberg; Thomas Olsson	S 131	~~DNF~~	~~73.0~~	37	43.0	36	42.0	16	22.0	28	34.0	43	49.0	PMS	73.0	336.0	263.0
44	USA	Wally Corwin	J.P. St. Germain; Chris Gerhard	US 801	~~51~~	~~57.0~~	54	60.0	17	23.0	54	60.0	52	58.0	33	39.0	30	36.0	333.0	273.0
45	ITA	Mario Celon	Claudio Celon; Corrado Biasi	I 230	~~DNF~~	~~73.0~~	39	45.0	35	41.0	14	20.0	31	37.0	55	61.0	PMS	73.0	350.0	277.0
46	USA	Jerry Castle	Joe Tomaselli; Terry Polidor	US 726	55	61.0	~~58~~	~~64.0~~	22	28.0	53	59.0	53	59.0	32	38.0	35	41.0	350.0	286.0
47	USA	Stuart H. Walker	Niki Seemann; Guy McKhann	US 725	46	52.0	51	57.0	40	46.0	23	29.0	39	45.0	51	57.0	~~PMS~~	~~73.0~~	359.0	286.0
48	SWE	Göran Sandberg	Peter Andersson; Jan Bjoemberg	S 124	34	40.0	23	29.0	~~PMS~~	~~73.0~~	28	34.0	56	62.0	45	51.0	PMS	73.0	362.0	289.0
49	USA	Joe Hoeksema	Rose Hoekema; Terry Anderson	US 715	44	50.0	~~56~~	~~62.0~~	39	45.0	46	52.0	55	61.0	41	47.0	31	37.0	354.0	292.0
50	POR	Antonio Tanger	Luis Miguel Santos; Jose Cunha	P 9	38	44.0	48	54.0	27	33.0	60	66.0	45	51.0	39	45.0	~~PMS~~	~~73.0~~	366.0	293.0
51	NED	Rudy den Outer	Robert Molsbergen; Jaap de Zeeuw	H 22	49	55.0	38	44.0	52	58.0	~~PMS~~	~~73.0~~	48	54.0	46	52.0	28	34.0	370.0	297.0
52	AUS	Murray Smith	Mike Huges; Russel Frame	KA 159	27	33.0	44	50.0	46	52.0	50	56.0	49	55.0	50	56.0	~~PMS~~	~~73.0~~	375.0	302.0
53	AUT	Christian Spiessberger	Martin Kendler; Christian Feichtinger	OE 94	42	48.0	32	38.0	48	54.0	51	57.0	54	60.0	40	46.0	~~PMS~~	~~73.0~~	376.0	303.0
54	SUI	Daniel Schenker	Christoph Schenker; Philiph Janneret	Z 271	45	51.0	~~53~~	~~59.0~~	47	53.0	52	58.0	47	53.0	37	43.0	39	45.0	362.0	303.0
55	FIN	Robert Roennback	Claus Gerkman; Marts Pahlman	L 47	~~DNF~~	~~73.0~~	52	58.0	38	44.0	58	64.0	51	57.0	38	44.0	34	40.0	380.0	307.0
56	BRA	Eduardo de Souza	Carlos Sampaio; Norman McPerson	BL 55	35	41.0	18	24.0	45	51.0	41	47.0	~~DNC~~	~~73.0~~	DNC	73.0	DNC	73.0	382.0	309.0
57	USA	Douglas McLean	Jeff Thorpe; Bill Fortenberry	US 739	YMP	52.2	40	46.0	~~DSQ~~	~~73.0~~	55	61.0	35	41.0	34	40.0	PMS	73.0	434.0	313.2
58	ESP	Jesús Turró	Luis Calzado; Javier Vallego	E 14	~~DNF~~	~~73.0~~	55	61.0	25	31.0	57	63.0	50	56.0	57	63.0	41	47.0	394.0	321.0
59	NED	Ton Koot	Frank Mulder; Chris Mastenberg	H 25	53	59.0	~~DNF~~	~~73.0~~	PMS	73.0	45	51.0	43	49.0	47	53.0	43	49.0	407.0	334.0
60	FIN	Heikki Hohtari	Joni Nuorivaara; Marc Lindroos	L 50	41	47.0	~~DNF~~	~~73.0~~	54	60.0	42	48.0	46	52.0	56	62.0	DNF	73.0	415.0	342.0
61	FRG	Roman Koch	Maxl Koch; Ralph Schrappe	G 266	~~DSQ~~	~~73.0~~	46	52.0	50	56.0	40	46.0	44	50.0	61	67.0	DNC	73.0	417.0	344.0
62	SUI	Jürg Menzi	Jürg Christen; Bernhard Wohlwend	Z 272	48	54.0	50	56.0	56	62.0	~~PMS~~	~~73.0~~	59	65.0	54	60.0	45	51.0	421.0	348.0
63	NED	Erik de Vrijer	Rien Segaar; Joost Nederkoorn	H 20	52	58.0	59	65.0	51	57.0	59	65.0	~~61~~	~~67.0~~	62	68.0	44	50.0	430.0	362.0
64	YUG	Bostjan Antoncic	Marco Kocjancic; Andrej Cergolj	Y 1	54	60.0	~~DNC~~	~~73.0~~	49	55.0	48	54.0	60	66.0	58	64.0	PMS	73.0	445.0	372.0
65	NED	Bram Soethoudt	Wilco Wessels; Frank Hermans	H 24	56	62.0	57	63.0	~~PMS~~	~~73.0~~	61	67.0	62	68.0	63	69.0	46	52.0	454.0	381.0
66	BRA	José Paulo Dias	Daniel Adler; José Augusto Dias	BL 45	~~DNF~~	~~73.0~~	DNF	73.0	DNC	73.0	DNC	73.0	DNC	73.0	DNC	73.0	DNC	73.0	511.0	438.0

Legend: DNF – Did not finish; DNS – Did not start; DSQ – Disqualified; RET – Retired;
Discard is crossed out and does not count for the overall result.

- 1990 Progress

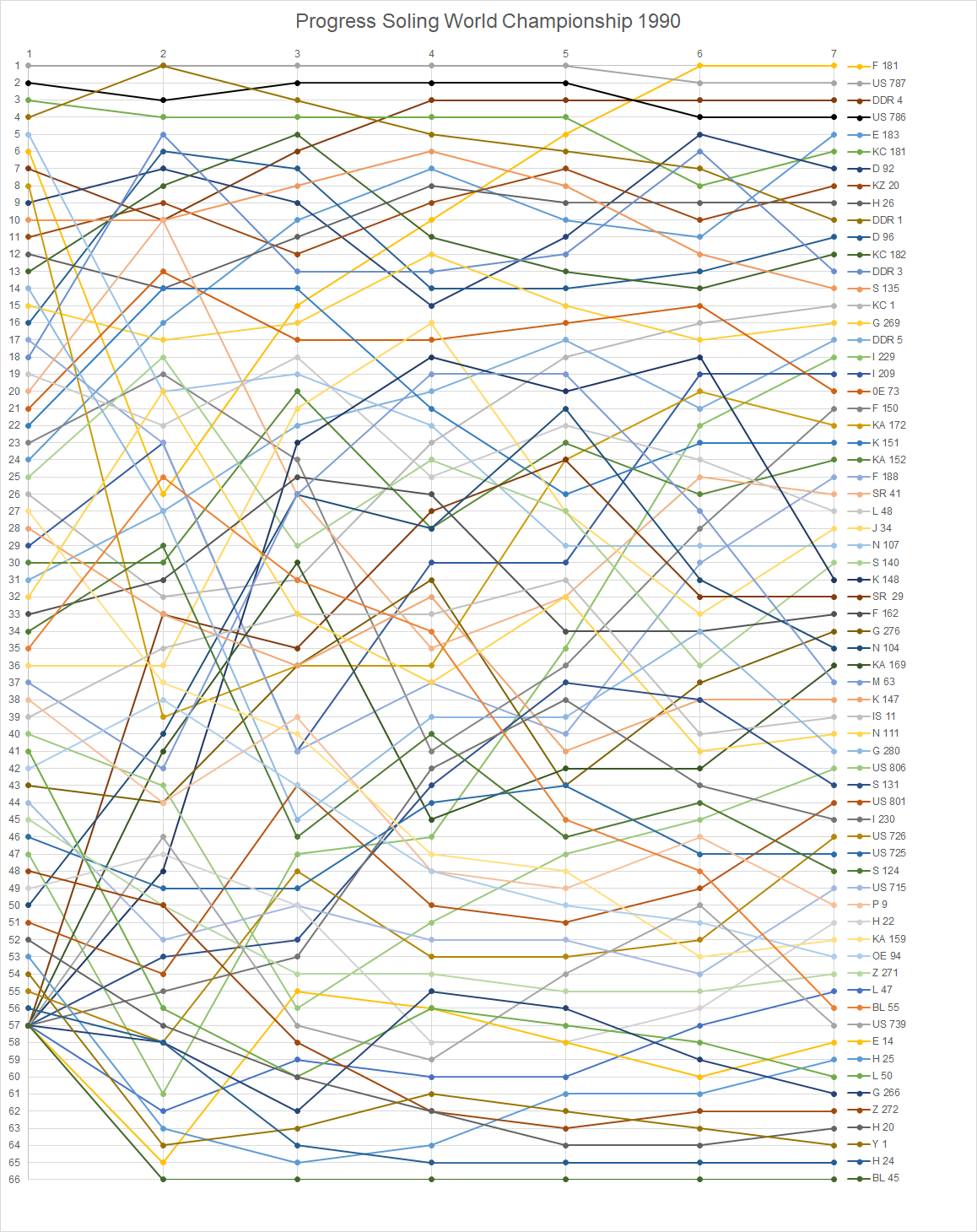

== Further results ==
For further results see:

- Soling World Championship results (1969–1979)
- Soling World Championship results (1980–1984)
- Soling World Championship results (1985–1989)
- Soling World Championship results (1990–1994)
- Soling World Championship results (1995–1999)
- Soling World Championship results (2000–2004)
- Soling World Championship results (2005–2009)
- Soling World Championship results (2010–2014)
- Soling World Championship results (2015–2019)
