= David Ashby (disambiguation) =

David Ashby (born 1940) was a Conservative member of Parliament in the United Kingdom.

David Ashby may also refer to:

- David Ashby (cricketer) (1852–1934), New Zealand cricket player
- David Ashby (sailor) (born 1938), Fijian sailor
- David Ashby (speedway rider) (1949–2015), British motorcycle racer

== See also ==
- David of Ashby (fl. 1260–1275), English-born Dominican friar
