= Luis Chiapparro =

Uruguayan sport sailor (born 1966)

Personal information
- Full name: Luis A. Chiapparro Moreno
- Nationality: Uruguay
- Born: 19 November 1966 (age 59)
- Height: 1.67 m (5.5 ft)

Sailing career
- Sport: Sailing
- Class: Soling
- Updated on 28 February 2020

Luis Chiapparro Moreno (Note: In this Spanish name, the first or paternal surname is Chiapparro and the second or maternal family name is Moreno.) (born 19 November 1966) is a sailor from Uruguay. who represented his country at the 1988 Summer Olympics in Busan, South Korea as crew member in the Soling. With helmsman Horacio Carabelli and fellow crew members Héber Ansorena they took the 16th place. Luis with helmsman Ricardo Fabini and fellow crew member Nicolás Parodi took 16th place during the 1992 Summer Olympics in Barcelona, Spain as helmsman in the Soling.
