= Ricardo Batista =

Ricardo Batista may refer to:

- Ricardo Batista (footballer)
- Ricardo Batista (sailor)
- Ricardo Batista (triathlete)
