= Sailing at the 1992 Summer Olympics – Soling =

Soling at the Games of the XXV Olympiad
- Soling
- Venue: Barcelona
- Dates: 27 July to 4 August
- Competitors: 72 from 24 nations
- Teams: 24

Medalists
1st place, gold medalist(s)		Jesper Bank; Steen Secher; Jesper Seier	Denmark
2nd place, silver medalist(s)		Kevin Mahaney; Jim Brady; Doug Kern	United States
3rd place, bronze medalist(s)		Lawrie Smith; Robert Cruickshank; Ossie Stewart	Great Britain

The Soling Competition at the 1992 Summer Olympics was held from 27 July to 4 August 1992 in Barcelona, Spain. The competition was for the first time in a combined format. First the competitors had to sail a series of six fleet races. Points were awarded for placement in each race. The best five out of six race scores counted for placement in the match race series. After the fleetraces the top 6 placed boats sailed a round-robin series of match races. After the round-robin the best four proceeded to the semi-finals. Here the boat placed 1st met the boat placed 4th and the boat placed 2nd met the boat placed 3rd in a best out of three series of match races. Finally the winners of the semi-finals met in the final best out of three match races. The losers of the semi-finals also met in a best out of three series of matches for the bronze medal.

== Results ==
=== Results after Fleetrace ===
Rank	Helmsman (Country)	Crew	Race I		Race II		Race III		Race IV		Race V		Race VI		Total Points	Total -1
Rank	Helmsman (Country)	Crew	Rank	Points	Rank	Points	Rank	Points	Rank	Points	Rank	Points	Rank	Points	Total Points	Total -1
1	Kevin Mahaney (USA)	Jim Brady; Doug Kern	1	0.0	7	13.0	3	5.7	1	0.0	3	5.7	~~DNC~~	~~31.0~~	55.4	24.4
3	Jochen Schümann (GER)	Thomas Flach; Bernd Jäkel	3	5.7	~~10~~	~~16.0~~	8	14.0	6	11.7	2	3.0	3	5.7	56.1	40.1
5	Lawrie Smith (GBR)	Robert Cruikshank; Ossie Stewart	~~15~~	~~21.0~~	1	0.0	4	8.0	5	10.0	14	20.0	5	10.0	69.0	48.0
2	Jesper Bank (DEN)	Steen Secher; Jesper Seier	2	3.0	2	3.0	1	0.0	8	14.0	8	14.0	~~DNC~~	~~31.0~~	65.0	34.0
4	Magnus Holmberg (SWE)	Björn Alm; Johan Barne	~~14~~	~~20.0~~	5	10.0	2	3.0	7	13.0	10	16.0	2	3.0	65.0	45.0
6	Fernando León Boissier (ESP)	Felipe de Borbón; Alfredo Vázquez	8	14.0	4	8.0	6	11.7	3	5.7	~~11~~	~~17.0~~	8	14.0	70.4	53.4
7	Paul Thomson (CAN)	Stuart Flinn; Philip Gow	6	11.7	6	11.7	7	13.0	4	8.0	6	11.7	~~12~~	~~18.0~~	74.1	56.1
8	Russell Coutts (NZL)	Simon Daubney; Graham Fleury	11	17.0	9	15.0	~~12~~	~~18.0~~	2	3.0	12	18.0	6	11.7	82.7	64.7
9	Serhiy Pichuhin (EUN)	Serhiy Khaindrava; Volodymyr Korotkov	10	16.0	14	20.0	~~PMS~~	~~31.0~~	10	16.0	19	25.0	1	0.0	108.0	77.0
10	Rune Jacobsen (NOR)	Thom Haaland; Erling Landsværk	4	8.0	~~18~~	~~24.0~~	9	15.0	17	23.0	4	8.0	18	24.0	102.0	78.0
11	William Hodder (AUS)	Tim Dorning; Michael Mottl	7	13.0	3	5.7	11	17.0	~~20~~	~~26.0~~	20	26.0	11	17.0	104.7	78.7
12	Kazunori Komatsu (JPN)	Yasuharu Fujiwara; Hideaki Takashiro	~~17~~	~~23.0~~	19	25.0	13	19.0	13	19.0	1	0.0	13	19.0	105.0	80.0
13	Jose Paulo Dias (BRA)	Jose Augusto Dias; Daniel Adler	16	22.0	13	19.0	5	10.0	11	17.0	9	15.0	~~17~~	~~23.0~~	106.0	83.0
14	Bruce Savage (RSA)	Giles Stanley; Rick Mayhew	13	19.0	8	14.0	~~15~~	~~21.0~~	12	18.0	7	13.0	20	26.0	111.0	85.0
15	Marc Bouet (FRA)	Fabrice Levet; Alain Pointet	12	18.0	11	17.0	14	20.0	14	20.0	15	21.0	7	13.0	109.0	88.0
16	Ricardo Fabini (URU)	Luis Chiapparro; Nicolás Parodi	5	10.0	12	18.0	~~PMS~~	~~31.0~~	16	22.0	17	23.0	14	20.0	124.0	93.0
17	Robin Tattersall (IVB)	Robert Hirst; John Shirley	~~19~~	~~25.0~~	20	26.0	19	25.0	21	27.0	5	10.0	4	8.0	121.0	94.0
18	Roy Heiner (NED)	Han Bergsma; Peter Burggraaff	~~18~~	~~24.0~~	17	23.0	10	16.0	15	21.0	13	19.0	10	16.0	119.0	95.0
19	Michael Luschan (AUT)	Stefan Lindner; Georg Stadler	9	15.0	15	21.0	17	23.0	9	15.0	18	24.0	~~19~~	~~25.0~~	123.0	98.0
20	Tassos Boudouris (GRE)	Dimitrios Deligiannis; Michael Mitakis	20	26.0	16	22.0	~~PMS~~	~~31.0~~	19	25.0	22	28.0	9	15.0	147.0	116.0
21	Antonio Tanger (POR)	Ricardo Batista; Luis Miguel Santos	~~21~~	~~27.0~~	21	27.0	16	22.0	18	24.0	16	22.0	15	21.0	143.0	116.0
22	Richard Hoad (BAR)	David Staples; Jason Teller	~~22~~	~~28.0~~	22	28.0	18	24.0	22	28.0	21	27.0	16	22.0	157.0	129.0
23	Colin Philp, Sr. (FIJ)	Colin Dunlop; David Philp	23	29.0	23	29.0	20	26.0	23	29.0	~~24~~	~~30.0~~	22	28.0	171.0	141.0
24	Mario Almario (PHI)	Teodorico Asejo; Juan Miguel Torres	~~24~~	~~30.0~~	24	30.0	21	27.0	24	30.0	23	29.0	21	27.0	173.0	143.0

DNF = Did Not Finish, DSQ = Disqualified, PMS = Premature Start
Crossed out results did not count for the total result.
= Male, = Female

=== Results after Matchracing ===
==== Round Robin ====
Team	United States	Denmark	Germany	Great Britain	Sweden	Spain	Points	Rank
United States	–	1	0	1	1	1	4	1
Denmark	0	–	1	1	0	1	3	2
Germany	1	0	–	1	0	1	3	3
Great Britain	0	0	0	–	1	1	2	4
Sweden	0	1	1	0	–	0	2	5
Spain	0	0	0	0	1	–	1	6

==== Finals (best of 3) ====
Semi-Finals
1	United States	2
4	Great Britain	0
2	Denmark	2
3	Germany	0

Finals
1	(silver) United States	0
2	(gold) Denmark	2
Third place
4	(bronze) Great Britain	2
3	Germany	1

=== Daily standings ===
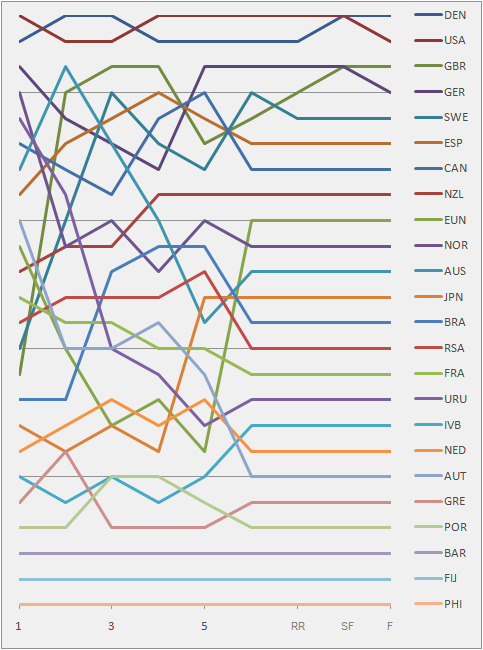
Graph showing the daily standings in the Soling during the 1992 Summer Olympics
