= Colin Philp Sr. =

Fijian sailor

Personal information
- Full name: Anthony Colin Philp, Sr.
- Nationality: Fiji
- Born: 4 November 1947 (age 78) Hobart, Tasmania, Australia
- Height: 1.81 m (5.9 ft)
- Weight: 85 kg (187 lb)

Sailing career
- Sport: Sailing
- Class: Soling
- Updated on 28 February 2020

Colin Philp Sr. (born 4 November 1947) is an Australian-born sailor from Fiji. He represented his country at the 1988 Summer Olympics in Busan, South Korea as crew member in the Soling. With helmsman David Ashby and fellow crew member Colin Dunlop, they finished in 19th place. At the 1992 Summer Olympics in Barcelona, Spain as helmsman and with fellow crew members Colin Dunlop and David Philp the team took 23rd place.
