= Michael Mitakis =

Olympic sailor from Greece

Michael Mitaki
Personal information
- Native name: Μιχαήλ Μιτάκης
- Nationality: Greece
- Born: 20 October 1959 (age 66) Piraeus

Sport

Sailing career
- Class: Soling
- Updated on 29 February 2020

Michael Mitaki (born 23 December 1961) is a sailor from Piraeus, Greece. who represented his country at the 1992 Summer Olympics in Barcelona, Spain as crew member in the Soling. With helmsman Tassos Boudouris and fellow crew member Dimitrios Deligiannis they took the 20th place.
