= Han Bergsma =

Dutch sailor (born 1961)

Personal information
- Full name: Hendrik Ate Bergsma
- Nationality: Dutch
- Born: 16 February 1961 (age 65) Akkrum
- Height: 1.93 m (6.3 ft)

Sport

Sailing career
- Class: Soling
Competition record
Representing Netherlands
Olympic Games
| 1992 Barcelona | Soling |
- Updated on 25 February 2014

Hendrik Ate "Han" Bergsma (born 16 February 1961 in Akkrum) is a sailor from the Netherlands, who represented his country at the 1992 Summer Olympics in Barcelona. Bergsma as crew in the Dutch Soling with Roy Heiner as helmsman and Peter Burggraaff as fellow crew member, Bergsma took 18th place.

== Professional life ==
Bergsma is nowadays Manager projectsupport at ProRail.
