= David Staples =

Olympic sailor from Barbados

Personal information
- Full name: David Murray Staples
- Nationality: Barbados
- Born: 27 August 1953 (age 72)

Sailing career
- Sport: Sailing
- Class: Soling
- Updated on 29 February 2020

David Staples (born: 27 August 1953) is a sailor from Barbados. who represented his country at the 1992 Summer Olympics in Barcelona, Spain as crew member in the Soling. With helmsman Richard Hoad and fellow crew member Jason Teller they took the 22nd place.
