= Georgios Spyridis =

Olympic sailor from Greece

Personal information
- Nationality: Greece
- Born: 22 March 1959 (age 66)
- Height: 1.84 m (6.0 ft)

Sport

Sailing career
- Class: Soling
- Updated on 27 February 2020

Georgios Spyridis (born 22 March 1959) is a sailor from Greece, who represented his country at the 1984 Summer Olympics in Los Angeles, United States as crew member in the Soling. With helmsman Anastasios Bountouris and fellow crew member Dimitrios Deligiannis they took the 6th place.
