= Colin Dunlop (sailor) =

Olympic sailor from Fiji

Personal information
- Full name: Colin Victor Craufurd Dunlop
- Nationality: Fijian
- Born: 28 February 1936 (age 90) Aldeburgh, England, United Kingdom
- Height: 1.80 m (5.9 ft)
- Weight: 75 kg (165 lb)

Sailing career
- Sport: Sailing
- Class: Soling
- Updated on 28 February 2020

Colin Dunlop (born 3 August 1962 in United Kingdom) is a Fijian sailor who represented his country at the 1988 Summer Olympics in Busan, South Korea, as crew member in the Soling. With helmsman David Ashby and fellow crew member Colin Philp, Sr., they finished in 19th place. At the 1992 Summer Olympics in Barcelona, Spain, Colin Philp, Sr. took the helm and with fellow crew member David Philp the team took 23rd place.
