= Kazuyuki Hyodo =

Olympic sailor from Japan

Personal information
- Native name: 兵藤 和行
- Nationality: Japan
- Born: 14 July 1964 (age 61) Shiga
- Height: 1.88 m (6.2 ft)

Sport

Sailing career
- Class: Soling
- Updated on 1 March 2020

Kazuyuki Hyodo (born 14 July 1964) is a sailor from Shiga, Japan. who represented his country at the 1996 Summer Olympics in Savannah, United States as crew member in the Soling. With helmsman Kazunori Komatsu and fellow crew member Masatoshi Hazama they took the 19th place.
