= Jan Eli Andersen =

Olympic sailor from Denmark

Personal information
- Nationality: Denmark
- Born: 7 July 1966 (age 59) Kerteminde
- Height: 1.88 m (6.2 ft)

Sport

Sailing career
- Class: Soling
- Updated on 29 February 2020

Jan Eli Andersen (born 7 July 1966) is a sailor from Kerteminde, Denmark. who represented his country at the 1996 Summer Olympics in Savannah, United States as crew member in the Soling. With helmsman Stig Westergaard and fellow crew member Jens Bojsen-Møller they took the 6th place.
