= Masatoshi Hazama =

Olympic sailor from Japan

Personal information
- Native name: 迫間 正敏
- Nationality: Japan
- Born: 6 January 1963 (age 62) Wakayama
- Height: 1.75 m (5.7 ft)

Sport

Sailing career
- Class: Soling
- Updated on 1 March 2020

Masatoshi Hazama (born 6 January 1963) is a sailor from Wakayama, Japan. who represented his country at the 1996 Summer Olympics in Savannah, United States as crew member in the Soling. With helmsman Kazunori Komatsu and fellow crew member Kazuyuki Hyodo they took the 19th place.
