= Jason Teller =

Olympic sailor from Barbados

Personal information
- Full name: Jason Lewis Teller
- Nationality: Barbados
- Born: 6 October 1972 (age 53) Paddington, United Kingdom

Sport

Sailing career
- Class: Soling
- Updated on 29 February 2020

Jason Teller (born: 6 October 1972) is a sailor from Barbados. who represented his country at the 1992 Summer Olympics in Barcelona, Spain as crew member in the Soling. With helmsman Richard Hoad and fellow crew member David Staples they took the 22nd place.
