= David Philp =

Olympic sailor from Fiji

Personal information
- Nationality: Fiji
- Born: 23 May 1971 (age 54)

Sport

Sailing career
- Class: Soling
- Updated on 29 February 2020

David Philp (born: 23 May 1971) is a sailor from Fiji. who represented his country at the 1992 Summer Olympics in Barcelona, Spain as crew member in the Soling. With helmsman Colin Philp, Sr. and fellow crew member Colin Dunlop they took the 23rd place.
