= Richard Hoad =

Barbadian Olympic sailor (1930–2019)

Personal information
- Full name: Richard Anthony Hoad
- Nationality: Barbados
- Born: 24 October 1930
- Died: 21 August 2019 (aged 88)

Sport

Sailing career
- Class: Soling
- Updated on 29 February 2020

Richard Anthony Hoad (24 October 1930 – 21 August 2019) was a Barbadian sailor, who represented his country at the 1992 Summer Olympics in Barcelona, Spain as helmsman in the Soling. With crew members David Staples and Jason Teller they took the 22nd place. Hoad died on 21 August 2019, at the age of 88.
