= Héber Ansorena =

Uruguayan sport sailor (1955–2020)

Personal information
- Full name: Héber H. Ansorena Mussio
- Nationality: Uruguayan
- Born: 14 August 1955
- Died: 27 July 2020 (aged 64)
- Height: 1.85 m (6.1 ft)

Sport

Sailing career
- Class: Soling
- Updated on 28 February 2020

Héber Ansorena (14 August 1955 – 27 July 2020) was a sailor from Uruguay who represented his country at the 1988 Summer Olympics in Busan, South Korea as crew member in the Soling. With helmsman Horacio Carabelli and fellow crew members Luis Chiapparro they took the 16th place.
