= Georg Stadler =

Olympic sailor from Austria

Personal information
- Nationality: Austria
- Born: 26 May 1961 (age 64) Bad Ischl
- Height: 1.80 m (5.9 ft)

Sport

Sailing career
- Class: Soling
- Club: Union Yacht Club Wolfgangsee
- Updated on 29 February 2020

Georg Stadler (born 26 May 1961) is a sailor from Bad Ischl, Austria. who represented his country at the 1992 Summer Olympics in Barcelona, Spain as crew member in the Soling. With helmsman Michael Luschan and fellow crew member Stefan Lindner they took the 19th place.
