= Nicolás Parodi =

Olympic sailor from Uruguay

Nicolás Parodio
Personal information
- Nationality: Uruguay
- Born: 19 November 1970 (age 55)

Sport

Sailing career
- Class: Soling
- Updated on 28 February 2020

Nicolás Parodi (born: 19 November 1970 ) is a sailor from Uruguay. who represented his country at the 1992 Summer Olympics in Barcelona, Spain as crew member in the Soling. With Helmsman Ricardo Fabini and fellow crew member Nicolás Parodi they took 16th in the Soling.
