= Ricardo Batista (sailor) =

Olympic sailor from Portugal

Personal information
- Full name: Ricardo Jorge Batista
- Nationality: Portugal
- Born: 30 December 1969 (age 56) Lisbon
- Height: 1.81 m (5.9 ft)

Sport

Sailing career
- Class: Soling
- Club: CD Paço d'Arcos
- Updated on 29 February 2020

Ricardo Batista (born 30 December 1969) is a sailor from Lisbon, Portugal. who represented his country at the 1992 Summer Olympics in Barcelona, Spain as crew member in the Soling. With helmsman Antonio Tanger and fellow crew member Luis Miguel Santos they took the 21st place.
