= Antal Székely =

Hungarian sailor

Personal information
- Nationality: Hungarian
- Born: 9 September 1959 (age 65); Pécs, Hungary

Antal Székely (born 9 September 1959) is a Hungarian sailor. He competed in the Finn event at the 1988 Summer Olympics.
