= Yasuharu Fujiwara =

Olympic sailor from Japan

Personal information
- Native name: 藤原 康治
- Nationality: Japan
- Born: 4 October 1958 (age 67) Tokyo
- Height: 1.80 m (5.9 ft)

Sport

Sailing career
- Class: Soling
- Updated on 29 February 2020

Yasuharu Fujiwara (born 4 October 1958) is a sailor from Tokyo, Japan. who represented his country at the 1992 Summer Olympics in Barcelona, Spain as crew member in the Soling. With helmsman Kazunori Komatsu and fellow crew member Hideaki Takashiro they took the 12th place.
