= Michael Mottl =

Olympic sailor from Australia

Personal information
- Full name: Michael Guy Mottl
- Nationality: Australia
- Born: 26 February 1968 (age 58)

Sailing career
- Sport: Sailing
- Class: Soling
- Updated on 29 February 2020

Michael Mottl (born 26 February 1968) is a sailor from Australia. who represented his country at the 1992 Summer Olympics in Barcelona, Spain as crew member in the Soling. With helmsman William Hodder and fellow crew member Tim Dorning they took the 11th place.
