= Thom Haaland =

Olympic sailor from Norway

Personal information
- Full name: Thom Bernhard Haaland
- Nationality: Norway
- Born: 25 February 1967 (age 59) Bergen
- Height: 1.94 m (6.4 ft)

Sailing career
- Sport: Sailing
- Club: KNS, Oslo
- Class: Soling
- Updated on 28 February 2020

Thom Bernhard Haaland (born 25 February 1967) is a sailor from Bergen, Norway. He has represented his country at the 1992 Summer Olympics in Barcelona, Spain as crew member in the Soling. With helmsman Rune Jacobsen and fellow crew member Erling Landsværk they took the 105th place.
