= David Ashby (sailor) =

Olympic sailor from Fiji

Personal information
- Full name: David Julian Ashby
- Nationality: Fiji
- Born: 22 July 1938 (age 87) New Zealand
- Height: 1.72 m (5.6 ft)
- Weight: 72 kg (159 lb)

Sailing career
- Sport: Sailing
- Class: Soling
- Updated on 28 February 2020

David Ashby (born 22 July 1938) is a New Zealand-born sailor from Fiji, who represented his country at the 1988 Summer Olympics in Busan, South Korea as helmsman in the Soling. With crew members Colin Dunlop and Colin Philp, Sr. they took the 19th place.
