= Dimitrios Deligiannis (sailor) =

Olympic sailor from Greece

Personal information
- Native name: Δημήτριος Δεληγιάννης
- Nationality: Greece
- Born: 15 October 1961 (age 64) Athens
- Height: 1.76 m (5.8 ft)

Sport

Sailing career
- Class: Soling
- Updated on 28 February 2020

Dimitrios Deligiannis (born 15 February 1961) is a sailor from Athens, Greece. who represented his country at the 1984 Summer Olympics in Los Angeles, United States as crew member in the Soling. With helmsman Tassos Boudouris and fellow crew members Georgios Spyridis they took the 6th place. During the 1988 Summer Olympics in Busan, South Korea Dimitrios again with Tassos but now with fellow crew members Antonios Bountouris and Georgios Prekas the team took the 18th place. Finally at the 1992 Summer Olympics in Barcelona, Spain he with Tassos and fellow crew member Michael Mitakis took the 22nd place.
