= Luis Miguel Santos =

Olympic sailor from Portugal

Personal information
- Full name: Luís Miguel Santos
- Nationality: Portugal
- Born: 28 September 1968 (age 57) Setúbal
- Height: 1.69 m (5.5 ft)

Sailing career
- Sport: Sailing
- Class: Soling
- Updated on 29 February 2020

Luis Miguel Santos (born 30 December 1969) is a sailor from Setúbal, Portugal. who represented his country at the 1992 Summer Olympics in Barcelona, Spain as crew member in the Soling. With helmsman Antonio Tanger and fellow crew member Ricardo Batista they took the 21st place.
