= Peter Burggraaff =

Dutch sailor (born 1971)

Personal information
- Full name: Peter Burggraaff
- Nationality: Dutch
- Born: 16 March 1971 (age 55) 's-Hertogenbosch
- Height: 1.87 m (6.1 ft)

Sailing career
- Sport: Sailing
- Class: Soling
Competition record
Representing Netherlands
Olympic Games
1992 Barcelona	Soling
- Updated on 25 February 2014

Peter Burggraaff (born 16 March 1971, in 's-Hertogenbosch) is a sailor from the Netherlands, who represented his country at the 1992 Summer Olympics in Barcelona. Burgraaff was crew in the Dutch Soling with Roy Heiner as helmsman and Han Bergsma as fellow crewmember. Burggraaff took 18th place.

== Professional life ==
- Business consultant: CapGemini (1996–1999)
- Managing partner: Tam Tam (2000–2002)
- Chief Information Officer: Farmers' Trading Company (2003–2006)
- IT outsource Program Director: HCL Technologies (2007)
- Partner and Director: The Boston Consulting Group (2008 – 2022)
- CEO: Vivara / CJ Wildbird Foods (2022 – Present)
