= Michael Peel =

British journalist

Michael Peel is a British journalist. He has written for various publications including Granta, New Republic, New Statesman and London Review of Books. He is currently science editor of the Financial Times.

== Early life ==
Peel grew up in Torquay, Devon, where he lived for about seven years, from the late 1970s to the mid-1980s. His mother was head teacher at the primary school which he attended there.

== Career ==
Educated at Trinity College, Oxford, where he studied chemistry, Peel joined the Financial Times in 1996. From 2002-2005, Peel was the West Africa correspondent for the Financial Times, based in Lagos, Nigeria. From March 2005 until 2006, Peel was an Associate Fellow of Chatham House, and a freelance journalist. He was appointed legal correspondent of the Financial Times in 2006, and has been middle east correspondent for the newspaper since January 2011.

Michael Peel's first book, A Swamp Full of Dollars (2009) was shortlisted for the Guardian First Book Award 2009.

== Bibliography ==
- Peel, Michael (2006). Nigeria-Related Financial Crime and its Links with Britain. Chatham House Report.
- Peel, Michael (2009). A Swamp Full of Dollars: pipelines and paramilitaries at Nigeria's oil frontier. London: I.B. Tauris.
- Peel, Michael (2019). The fabulists: the world's new rulers, their myths and the struggle against them. London. ISBN 9781786076601.
