= Fabrice Levet =

Olympic sailor from France

Personal information
- Nationality: France
- Born: 19 November 1959 (age 66) Toulouse
- Height: 1.87 m (6.1 ft)

Sport

Sailing career
- Class: Soling
- Club: Yacht Club la Baule
- Updated on 29 February 2020

Fabrice Levet (born 19 November 1959) is a sailor from Toulouse, France. who represented his country at the 1992 Summer Olympics in Barcelona, Spain as crew member in the Soling. With helmsman Marc Bouet and fellow crew member Alain Pointet they took the 15th place.
