= Hideaki Takashiro =

Olympic sailor from Japan

Personal information
- Native name: 高城 秀光
- Nationality: Japan
- Born: 22 February 1959 (age 66) Tokyo
- Height: 1.75 m (5.7 ft)

Sport

Sailing career
- Class: Soling
- Updated on 29 February 2020

Hideaki Takashiro (born 22 February 1959) is a sailor from Tokyo, Japan who represented his country at the 1992 Summer Olympics in Barcelona, Spain as crew member in the Soling. With helmsman Kazunori Komatsu and fellow crew member Yasuharu Fujiwara they took the 12th place.
