= Daniel Ferre =

French sailor

Personal information
- Nationality: French
- Born: 9 November 1962 (age 62)

Sport
- Sport: Sailing

Daniel Ferre (born 9 November 1962) is a French sailor. He competed in the Flying Dutchman event at the 1988 Summer Olympics.
