= Björn Alm =

Olympic sailor from Sweden

Personal information
- Full name: Björn Erik Alm
- Nationality: Sweden
- Born: 23 December 1961 (age 64) Borlänge, Sweden
- Height: 1.82 m (6 ft 0 in)

Sailing career
- Sport: Sailing
- Club: Royal Gothenburg Yacht Club
- Class: Soling
- Updated on 29 February 2020

Björn Erik Alm (born 23 December 1961) is a Swedish sailor from Borlänge who represented his country at the 1992 Summer Olympics in Barcelona, Spain as crew member in the Soling. With helmsman Magnus Holmberg and fellow crew member Johan Barne they took the 5th place. Björn with helmsman Magnus Holmberg and fellow crew member Johan Barne took 13th place during the 1996 Summer Olympics in Savannah, Georgia, United States in the Soling.
