= Rune Jacobsen =

Norwegian sailor (born 1967)

Personal information
- Nationality: Norway
- Born: 28 September 1967; Bergen
- Height: 1.87 m (6.1 ft)

Sailing career
- Class: Soling
- Club: Asker Seilforening
- Updated on 29 February 2020

Rune Jacobsen (born 28 September 1967 Bergen) is a sailor from Norway, who represented his country at the 1992 Summer Olympics in Barcelona, Spain as helmsman in the Soling. With crew members Erling Landsværk and Thom Haaland they took the 10th place.

Jacobsen is currently managing director and Senior Partner at the Boston Consulting Group and heads the Hong Kong and Shenzhen offices.
