= Jaap de Zeeuw =

Dutch sailor

Personal information
- Full name: Jacob Cornelis de Zeeuw
- Nationality: Dutch
- Born: 19 December 1954 (age 71) Numansdorp
- Height: 1.70 m (5.6 ft)

Sailing career
- Sport: Sailing
- Club: Watersport Vereniging Binnenmaas; Formerly Watersport Vereniging Eeuwes
- Classes: 470; Yngling; Soling
Medal record
sailing
Representing Netherlands
Dutch Championship
Gold medal – first place	1995 Scheveningen	Soling
- Updated on 2014-01-28

Jacob Cornelis de Zeeuw (19 December 1954, Numansdorp) is a sailor from the Netherlands, who represented his country at the 1976 Summer Olympics in Kingston, Ontario, Canada as substitute for the Dutch 470 team of Joop van Werkhoven and Robert van Werkhoven.

== Sailing career ==
De Zeeuw started in the 420 with Bas de Koning as helmsman. In this class De Zeeuw took the Dutch Championship 1971. De Zeeuw made the stap into the 470 but did not made the selection. However De Zeeuw with his brother worked as sparrings partners for the Van Werkhoven bros. This resulted in De Zeeuw's selection for the 1976 Olympics. After the Olympics De Zeeuw took the European Championship in the Prindle 16 catamaran.

Later De Zeeuw specialized in National and International keelboat classes like Centaur and Yngling. De Zeeuw took the 1995 Dutch Championship in the Olympic Soling with Leo Determan and helmsman Rudy den Outer.

== Professional life ==
De Zeeuw studied Physical therapy on the IHBO, Vlissingen. As Physiotherapist De Zeeuw supported the Swedish Speed Skating Team of coach Kees Verkerk. Nowadays De Zeeuw teaches Dutch as a second language.

== Sources ==
- "Nederlandse delegatie" (in Dutch). Leeuwarder courant : hoofdblad van Friesland. 1976-07-12.
- "RZV Galerij der Kampioenen" (PDF) (in Dutch). Rotterdamsche Zeilvereeniging.
- "Gouden dag zeilers" (in Dutch). De Telegraaf. 1976-05-25.
- "Nederlandse delegatie" (in Dutch). Leeuwarder courant : hoofdblad van Friesland. 1976-07-12.
- "Olympische zeilselectie" (in Dutch). De Telegraaf. 1976-05-20.
- "Montréal 1976 Official Report, Volume I: Organization" (PDF). Ottawa: COJO. 1978. Archived from the original (PDF) on February 2, 2014.
- "Montréal 1976 Official Report, Volume II: Facilities" (PDF). Ottawa: COJO. 1978. Archived from the original (PDF) on February 2, 2014.
- "Montréal 1976 Official Report, Volume III: Results" (PDF). Ottawa: COJO. 1978. Archived from the original (PDF) on January 1, 2014.
- "Jaap de Zeeuw". www.linkedin.com.
