= Jens Bojsen-Møller =

Danish sailor (born 1966)

Medal record

Men's sailing

Representing Denmark

Olympic Games
Bronze medal – third place	1992 Barcelona	Flying Dutchman

Jens Bojsen-Møller (born 8 June 1966) is a Danish sailor and Olympic medalist. He competed at the 1992 Summer Olympics in Barcelona and won a bronze medal in the Flying Dutchman class, together with his cousin Jørgen Bojsen-Møller.

Jens Bojsen-Møller became Master of Science (MSc) in 1999 and PhD in 2005 from the University of Copenhagen.
