= Stefan Lindner =

Olympic sailor from Austria

Personal information
- Nationality: Austria
- Born: 7 April 1966 (age 59) Klagenfurt
- Height: 1.83 m (6.0 ft)

Sport

Sailing career
- Class: Soling
- Club: KYC Klagenfurt
- Updated on 29 February 2020

Stefan Lindner (born 7 April 1966) is a sailor from Klagenfurt, Austria. who represented his country at the 1992 Summer Olympics in Barcelona, Spain as crew member in the Soling. With helmsman Michael Luschan and fellow crew member Georg Stadlerr they took the 19th place.
