= Michael Luschan =

Olympic sailor from Austria

Personal information
- Nationality: Austria
- Born: 17 September 1965 Salzburg
- Height: 1.81 m (5.9 ft)

Sport

Sailing career
- Class: Soling
- Club: Union Yacht Club Wolfgangsee
- Updated on 29 February 2020

Michael Luschan (born 17 September 1965, in Salzburg) is a sailor from Austria, who represented his country at the 1992 Summer Olympics in Barcelona, Spain as helmsman in the Soling. With crew members Georg Stadler and Stefan Lindner they took the 19th place.
