= Marc Bouet =

Olympic sailor from France

Personal information
- Nationality: France
- Born: 7 May 1951 (age 74) Nantes
- Height: 1.77 m (5.8 ft)

Sport

Sailing career
- Class: Soling
- Club: Yacht Club la Baule
- Updated on 29 February 2020

Marc Bouet (born 7 May 1951 in Nantes) is a sailor from France, who represented his country at the 1992 Summer Olympics in Barcelona, Spain as helmsman in the Soling. With crew members Fabrice Levet and Alain Pointet they took the 15th place. Marc with crew members Gildas Morvan and Sylvain Chtounder took 11th place during the 1996 Summer Olympics in Savannah, United States as helmsman in the Soling.
