= Roy Heiner =

Dutch sailor (born 1960)

Personal information
- Full name: Roy Heiner
- Nationality: Dutch
- Born: 22 November 1960 (age 65) Virginia, Free State, South Africa
- Height: 1.93 m (6.3 ft)

Sailing career
- Sport: Sailing
- Classes: Finn; Star; Soling
Medal record
Representing Netherlands
Olympic Games
Bronze medal – third place	1996 Atlanta	Finn

Roy Heiner (born 22 November 1960) is a Dutch sailor with four Olympic appearances, including a bronze medal from the 1996 Summer Olympics.

== Biography ==
Heiner was born on 22 November 1960 in Virginia, Free State, South Africa, to Dutch parents and spent most of his upbringing in South Africa. He represented the Netherlands at the 1988 Summer Olympics in Busan. Heiner took seventh place in the Finn event. At the 1992 Summer Olympics, Barcelona, Heiner helmed the Dutch Soling with crew members Peter Burggraaff and Han Bergsma and took 18th place.

Heiner switched back to the Finn for the 1996 Summer Olympics regatta in Savannah, Georgia, and took the bronze medal. His last Olympic appearance was in the 2000 Sydney Olympics. With crew members Peter van Niekerk and Dirk de Ridder, they took fifth place in the Soling event.

== Sailing career ==
Besides his Olympic sailing career Heiner competed on professional basis in:

- Three years in the World Matchrace circuit
- Three Volvo Ocean Races,
  - Skipper of Brunel Sunergy (1997–1998)
  - Skipper of Assa Abloy (2002) for the first leg (sacked in Cape Town)
  - Technical Director of the winning Team ABN AMRO campaign (2005–2006)
- BMW Oracle (America's Cup 2003) in new Zealand as:
  - Training boat helmsman
  - Afterguard coach of the racing team

== Professional life ==
Heiner holds a BSc in Civil Engineering from the University of Durban-Westville (1980–1985). In 1996 Heiner founded his Sailing academy: Team Heiner nowadays located in Lelystad.
