= Erling Landsværk =

Olympic sailor from Norway

Personal information
- Nationality: Norway
- Born: 19 January 1962 (age 63) Bærum
- Height: 1.89 m (6.2 ft)

Sport

Sailing career
- Class: Soling
- Club: Asker Seilforening
- Updated on 28 February 2020

Erling Landsværk (born 19 January 1962) is a sailor from Bærum, Norway, who represented his country at the 1992 Summer Olympics in Barcelona, Spain as crew member in the Soling. With helmsman Rune Jacobsen and fellow crew member Thom Haaland they took the 10th place.
