= Alain Pointet =

Olympic sailor from France

Personal information
- Nationality: France
- Born: 4 February 1957 Neuilly-sur-Seine, France
- Died: 21 March 2002 (aged 45) La Trinite-sur-Mer, France
- Height: 1.82 m (6 ft 0 in)

Sport

Sailing career
- Class: Soling
- Club: Trinite sur Mer
- Updated on 29 February 2020

Alain Pointet (4 February 1957 – 21 March 2002) was a sailor from Neuilly-sur-Seine, France. who represented his country at the 1992 Summer Olympics in Barcelona, Spain as crew member in the Soling. With Fabrice Levet and helmsman Marc Bouet they finished in 15th place.
