= William Hodder =

Olympic sailor from Australia

Personal information
- Full name: William Leyland Hodder
- Nationality: Australia
- Born: 31 August 1947

Sailing career
- Sport: Sailing
- Class: Soling
- Updated on 29 February 2020

William Hodder (born 31 August 1947) is a sailor from Australia, who represented his country at the 1992 Summer Olympics in Barcelona, Spain as helmsman in the Soling. With crew members Tim Dorning and Michael Mottl they took the 11th place.
