= Kazunori Komatsu =

Japanese sailor (born 1948)

Personal information
- Native name: 小松 一憲
- Nationality: Japan
- Born: 9 April 1948 (age 76); Kanagawa
- Height: 1.76 m (5.8 ft)

Sailing career
- Class: Soling
- Updated on 28 February 2020

Kazunori Komatsu (born 9 April 1948) is a sailor from Kanagawa, Japan, who represented his country at the 1988 Summer Olympics in Busan, South Korea as helmsman in the Soling. With crew members Kazuo Hanaoka and Tadashi Ikeda they took the 11th place. Kazunori with crew members Yasuharu Fujiwara and Hideaki Takashiro took 11th place during the 1992 Summer Olympics in Barcelona, Spain as helmsman in the Soling. Finally Komatsu with crew members Masatoshi Hazama and Kazuyuki Hyodo took 19th place during the 1996 Summer Olympics in Savannah, United States as helmsman in the Soling.
