= Alfredo Vázquez (sailor) =

Olympic sailor from Spain

Personal information
- Full name: Alfredo Vázquez Jiménez
- Nationality: Spain
- Born: 24 April 1963 (age 63) Vigo

Sailing career
- Sport: Sailing
- Class: Soling
- Updated on 28 February 2020

Alfredo Vázquez (born 24 April 1963) is a sailor from Vigo, Spain, who represented his country at the 1992 Summer Olympics in Barcelona, Spain, as crew member in the Soling. With helmsman Fernando León and fellow crew member, now, Felipe VI of Spain they took the 6th place.
