= Magnus Holmberg =

Swedish sailor (born 1961)

Personal information
- Full name: Johan Magnus Holmberg
- Born: 23 September 1961 (age 64) Gothenburg, Sweden

Sailing career
- Sport: Sailing
- Club: Royal Gothenburg Yacht Club
- Classes: 470, Soling

Johan Magnus Holmberg (born 23 September 1961) is a Swedish Olympic sailor that represented Sweden at the 1984, 1992, and 1996 Summer Olympics. In 1992, he finished 5th together with his crew of Björn Alm and Johan Barne in the Soling class.

He sailed for Victory Challenge in the 2003 and 2007 Louis Vuitton Cups.
