= Soling European Championship results (1985–1989) =

Soling European Championships

Soling
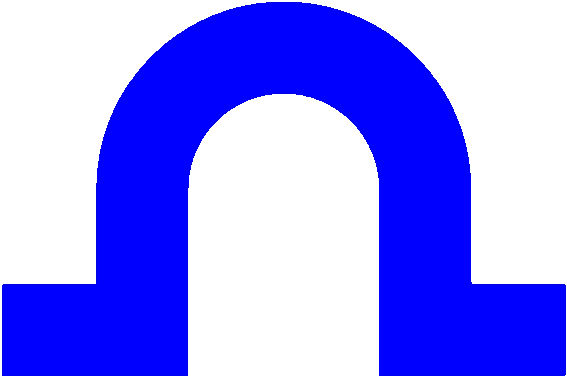

Development
- Name: Soling

The main article describes all European Soling Championships from one the first held in 1968 to the announced Championships in the near future. This article states the detailed results, where relevant the controversies, and the progression of the Championship during the series race by race of the European Soling Championships in the years 1985, 1986, 1987, 1988 and 1989. This is based on the major sources: World Sailing, the world governing body for the sport of sailing recognized by the IOC and the IPC, and the publications of the International Soling Association. Unfortunately, not all crew names are documented in the major sources.

== 1985 Final results ==
1985
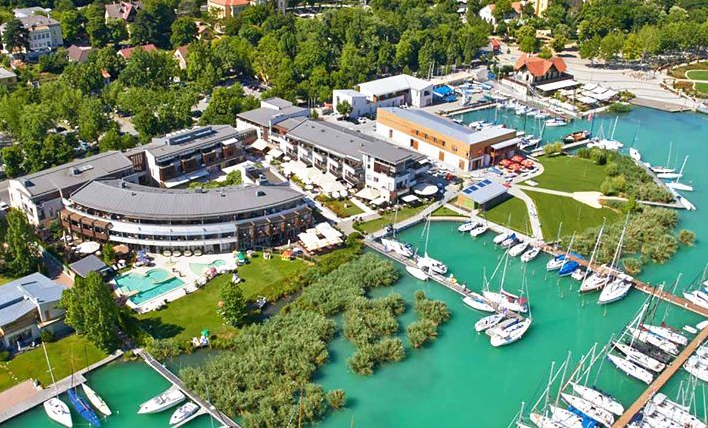

Event title
- Edition: 18
- Host: Balatonfüredi Sport Club

Event details
- Venue: Balatonfüred, Hungary
- Dates: 17–27 May
- Yachts: 53
- Opening ceremony: 21 May

Competitors
- Competitors: 159
- Competing nations: 15

Results
- (gold) Gold: Norway; Terje Wang; Jan Petterson; Bjørn Selander
- (silver) Silver: East Germany; Jochen Schümann; Thomas Flach; Bernd Jäkel
- (bronze) Bronze: Soviet Union; Georgy Shayduko; Sergey Kanov; Nikolay Polyakov

Remarkable is that the Norwegian team won this European Championship without a single race victory. The team of Jochen Schumann was in the lead until the final leg of the event. On the last moment team Terje Wang took the 8th place in the final race, thus winning the event by just one point.

Rank	Country	Helmsman	Crew	Sail No.	Race 1		Race 2		Race 3		Race 4		Race 5		Race 6		Race 7		Total	Total – discard
Rank	Country	Helmsman	Crew	Sail No.	Pos.	Pts.	Pos.	Pts.	Pos.	Pts.	Pos.	Pts.	Pos.	Pts.	Pos.	Pts.	Pos.	Pts.	Total	Total – discard
1st place, gold medalist(s)	NOR	Terje Wang	Jan Petterson; Bjørn Selander	N 96	12	18.0	6	11.7	~~25~~	~~31.0~~	2	3.0	3	5.7	2	3.0	8	14.0	86.4	55.4
2nd place, silver medalist(s)	GDR	Jochen Schümann	Thomas Flach; Bernd Jäkel	DDR 1	1	0.0	3	5.7	1	0.0	3	5.7	15	21.0	18	24.0	~~22~~	~~28.0~~	84.4	56.4
3rd place, bronze medalist(s)	URS	Georgy Shayduko	Sergey Kanov; Nikolay Polyakov	SR 27	7	13.0	~~14~~	~~20.0~~	10	16.0	5	10.0	2	3.0	14	20.0	1	0.0	82.0	62.0
4	USA	John Kostecki	Robert Billingham; William Baylis	US 706	10	16.0	8	14.0	13	19.0	~~27~~	~~33.0~~	1	0.0	13	19.0	4	8.0	109.0	76.0
5	FRG	Erich Hirt, Jr.	Frank Neufing; Kai Michels	G 219	4	8.0	15	21.0	2	3.0	17	23.0	7	13.0	8	14.0	~~21~~	~~27.0~~	109.0	82.0
6	FIN	Tom Jungell	Markus Mannstrom; S. Harima	L 47	9	15.0	13	19.0	YMP	26.0	~~33~~	~~39.0~~	4	8.0	5	10.0	3	5.7	122.7	83.7
7	FRG	Willi Kuhweide	Axel May; Karsten Meyer	G 245	11	17.0	1	0.0	19	25.0	8	14.0	8	14.0	10	16.0	~~27~~	~~33.0~~	119.0	86.0
8	URS	Boris Budnikov	Oleg Miron; Gennadi Strakh	SR 33	5	10.0	~~27~~	~~33.0~~	22	28.0	1	0.0	6	11.7	11	17.0	26	32.0	131.7	98.7
9	GDR	Helmar Nauck	Norbert Hellriegel; Sven Diedering	DDR 4	8	14.0	22	28.0	23	29.0	12	18.0	~~27~~	~~33.0~~	1	0.0	5	10.0	132.0	99.0
10	FRG	Thomas Jungblut	Klaus Stryi; Tim Kröger	G 262	17	23.0	12	18.0	18	24.0	15	21.0	~~50~~	~~56.0~~	9	15.0	6	11.7	168.7	112.7
11	DEN	Jesper Bank	Jan Mathiasen; Steen Secher	D 83	14	20.0	2	3.0	3	5.7	34	40.0	23	29.0	12	18.0	~~45~~	~~51.0~~	166.7	115.7
12	FRG	Karl Haist	S. Nikolaus; Christian Pauksch	G 252	6	11.7	20	26.0	~~32~~	~~38.0~~	21	27.0	16	22.0	23	29.0	2	3.0	156.7	118.7
13	DEN	Valdemar Bandolowski	Niels Petersen; Nomen nescio	D 84	18	24.0	21	27.0	12	18.0	4	8.0	~~36~~	~~42.0~~	24	30.0	9	15.0	164.0	122.0
14	SWE	Lennart Persson	Eje Öberg; Tony Wallin	S 124	15	21.0	18	24.0	5	10.0	~~43~~	~~49.0~~	28	34.0	7	13.0	15	21.0	172.0	123.0
15	HUN	D. Bartos	S. Pettenkoffer; G. Boronkay	M 21	39	45.0	16	22.0	8	14.0	~~DSQ~~	~~60.0~~	10	16.0	6	11.7	11	17.0	185.7	125.7
16	HUN	György Fináczy	Andras Toronyi; Tibor Izsak	M 25	30	36.0	7	13.0	17	23.0	20	26.0	~~42~~	~~48.0~~	4	8.0	14	20.0	174.0	126.0
17	GDR	Ralf Völker	Steffen Voigt; Laurent Scheel	DDR 3	13	19.0	~~PMS~~	~~60.0~~	11	17.0	32	38.0	13	19.0	15	21.0	7	13.0	187.0	127.0
18	FRG	Daniel Diesing	Thomas Maschkiwitz; A. Schlitter	G 251	2	3.0	4	8.0	39	45.0	~~DNF~~	~~60.0~~	5	10.0	16	22.0	39	45.0	193.0	133.0
19	FRG	Roman Koch	Maxl Koch; Dieter Link	G 242	3	5.7	24	30.0	27	33.0	11	17.0	22	28.0	~~28~~	~~34.0~~	20	26.0	173.7	139.7
20	HUN	György Wossala	László Kovácsi; L. Vajtai	M 77	16	22.0	5	10.0	~~38~~	~~44.0~~	10	16.0	21	27.0	30	36.0	33	39.0	194.0	150.0
21	FRG	Achim Kadelbach	Peter Wallner; J. Damerics	G 255	23	29.0	10	16.0	15	21.0	23	29.0	~~33~~	~~39.0~~	27	33.0	17	23.0	190.0	151.0
22	DEN	Jens Ranlov	J. Hemmingsen; M. Bache	D 80	21	27.0	36	42.0	6	11.7	18	24.0	~~47~~	~~53.0~~	20	26.0	25	31.0	214.7	161.7
23	NOR	Kalle Nergaard	Kristian Nergaard; Peter Hauff	N 87	20	26.0	23	29.0	~~33~~	~~39.0~~	13	19.0	24	30.0	31	37.0	18	24.0	204.0	165.0
24	USA	Stuart H. Walker	P. Verdin; P. Proitz	US 725	19	25.0	34	40.0	7	13.0	36	42.0	43	49.0	3	5.7	~~44~~	~~50.0~~	224.7	174.7
25	AUT	Uli Strohschneider	Hannes Blaschke; Andreas Blaschke	OE 58	22	28.0	28	34.0	20	26.0	~~47~~	~~53.0~~	12	18.0	35	41.0	28	34.0	234.0	181.0
26	HUN	P. Gomory	Georgy Galantha; P. Karg	M 22	25	31.0	11	17.0	~~DSQ~~	~~60.0~~	30	36.0	26	32.0	26	32.0	31	37.0	245.0	185.0
27	ITA	Flavio Favini	Marco di Natale; Giorgio Passoni	I 154	37	43.0	9	15.0	4	8.0	44	50.0	9	15.0	~~DSQ~~	~~60.0~~	YMP	56.0	247.0	187.0
28	AUT	Christian Spießberger	K. Spießberger; Thomas Linortner	OE 54	32	38.0	26	32.0	9	15.0	25	31.0	~~48~~	~~54.0~~	17	23.0	43	49.0	242.0	188.0
29	POL	J. Olszewski	R. Chybinski; J. Kwiecnski	PZ 4	35	41.0	32	38.0	~~37~~	~~43.0~~	35	41.0	11	17.0	32	38.0	10	16.0	234.0	191.0
30	HUN	I Szalai	Z. Sabian; F. Kovacs	M 13	38	44.0	37	43.0	28	34.0	6	11.7	35	41.0	~~48~~	~~54.0~~	13	19.0	246.7	192.7
31	HUN	Zs. Beresi	B. Puzsar; I. Takacs	M 6	34	40.0	25	31.0	~~42~~	~~48.0~~	19	25.0	30	36.0	33	39.0	23	29.0	248.0	200.0
32	GRE	Dimitrios Deligiannis	D. Benakis; V. Glaridis	GR 30	26	32.0	19	25.0	~~DNF~~	~~60.0~~	9	15.0	46	52.0	PMS	60.0	16	22.0	266.0	206.0
33	POL	R. Wolniewicz	B. Brudkiewicz; W. Cholewa	PZ 3	33	39.0	29	35.0	24	30.0	24	30.0	~~44~~	~~50.0~~	19	25.0	41	47.0	256.0	206.0
34	SUI	Christian Grimm	M. Grimm; M. Beetschen	Z 258	28	34.0	39	45.0	~~43~~	~~49.0~~	26	32.0	29	35.0	22	28.0	29	35.0	258.0	209.0
35	HUN	T. Galgoczy	L. Kiraly; A.H. Varga	M 81	29	35.0	31	37.0	45	51.0	42	48.0	17	23.0	~~DSQ~~	~~60.0~~	12	18.0	272.0	212.0
36	FIN	Heikki Hohtari	J. Majander; P. Salmela	L 41	~~51~~	~~57.0~~	30	36.0	21	27.0	22	28.0	18	24.0	43	49.0	46	52.0	273.0	216.0
37	HUN	T. Tusnai	G. Szakatsits; J. Agost	M 71	31	37.0	33	39.0	26	32.0	38	44.0	19	25.0	~~41~~	~~47.0~~	38	44.0	268.0	221.0
38	HUN	J. Drgacs	R. Kovacs; T. Horvath	M 18	~~47~~	~~53.0~~	17	23.0	30	36.0	50	56.0	32	38.0	36	42.0	24	30.0	278.0	222.0
39	SUI	Roger Guignard	S. Bagyo; J.D. Gendre	Z 259	~~36~~	~~42.0~~	35	41.0	34	40.0	31	37.0	25	31.0	29	35.0	34	40.0	266.0	224.0
40	HUN	M. Majoross	T. Farkas; Zs. Nagy	M 24	~~49~~	~~55.0~~	40	46.0	40	46.0	7	13.0	45	51.0	38	44.0	19	25.0	280.0	225.0
41	AUT	Carl Auteried Jr.	Martin Zeileis; Georg Zeileis	OE 90	27	33.0	44	50.0	36	42.0	29	35.0	34	40.0	25	31.0	~~DNF~~	~~60.0~~	291.0	231.0
42	HUN	Szabolcs Detre	Zsolt Detre; T. Bakos	M 63	24	30.0	~~DSQ~~	~~60.0~~	PMS	60.0	37	43.0	40	46.0	21	27.0	30	36.0	302.0	242.0
43	HUN	F. Bartha	Cs Erenyi; L. Szilasi	M 23	44	50.0	46	52.0	29	35.0	~~48~~	~~54.0~~	14	20.0	34	40.0	40	46.0	297.0	243.0
44	FRG	B. Blomberg	A. Merlevede; L. Lange	G 241	41	47.0	43	49.0	~~48~~	~~54.0~~	16	22.0	31	37.0	42	48.0	35	41.0	298.0	244.0
45	HUN	A. Korcsog	L. Racz; M. Demenczky	M 4	~~43~~	~~49.0~~	38	44.0	41	47.0	28	34.0	20	26.0	40	46.0	42	48.0	294.0	245.0
46	FRG	Hugo Kriebel	Dieter Meusinger; T. Stefan	G 234	~~48~~	~~54.0~~	42	48.0	14	20.0	46	52.0	39	45.0	37	43.0	32	38.0	300.0	246.0
47	FRG	Hans Heitmann	Martin Heitmann; Mathias Heitmann	G 215	46	52.0	48	54.0	46	52.0	14	20.0	38	44.0	44	50.0	~~DNC~~	~~60.0~~	332.0	272.0
48	ITA	Silvio Santoni	Fabio Toccoli; A. Ansaldi	I 220	45	51.0	47	53.0	16	22.0	41	47.0	~~51~~	~~57.0~~	39	45.0	48	54.0	329.0	272.0
49	SUI	Heiki Blok	Andreas Keller; Bruno Wild	Z 249	42	48.0	45	51.0	35	41.0	39	45.0	37	43.0	~~DNC~~	~~60.0~~	DNC	60.0	348.0	288.0
50	GBR	Tony Clare	D. Woolner histian Robinson	K 136	50	56.0	41	47.0	~~DNF~~	~~60.0~~	40	46.0	41	47.0	47	53.0	37	43.0	352.0	292.0
51	ITA	N. Chemolli	A. Angelini; P. Digirolamo	I 199	40	46.0	~~49~~	~~55.0~~	44	50.0	45	51.0	49	55.0	46	52.0	36	42.0	351.0	296.0
52	ITA	G. Benedetti	D'Adda; R. Verginella	I 163	~~53~~	~~59.0~~	50	56.0	49	55.0	49	55.0	52	58.0	45	51.0	49	55.0	389.0	330.0
53	ITA	A. Manenti	M. Manenti; F. Bertalli	I 214	52	58.0	51	57.0	47	53.0	~~DNF~~	~~60.0~~	53	59.0	49	55.0	47	53.0	395.0	335.0

Legend: DNF – Did not finish; DNS – Did not start; DSQ – Disqualified;
Discard is crossed out and does not count for the overall result.

- 1985 Progress

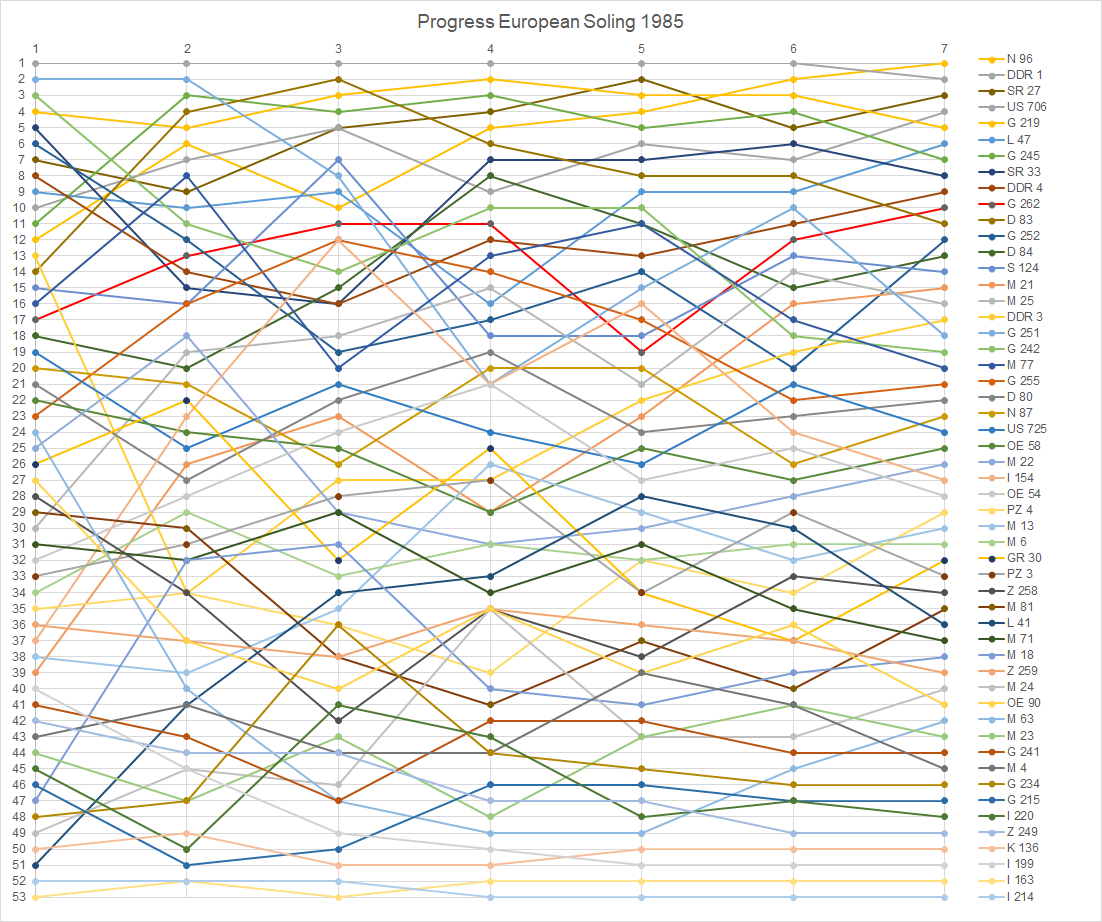

== 1986 Final results ==
1986
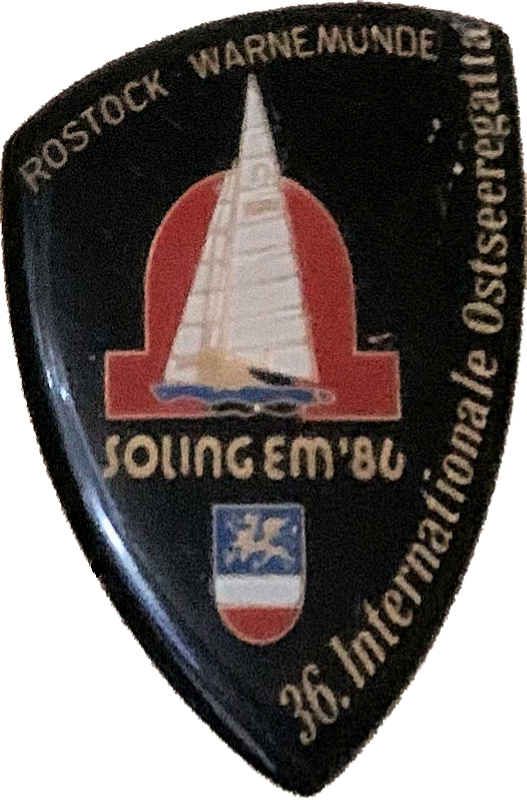

Event title
- Edition: 19

Event details
- Venue: Warnemünde, East Germany
- Dates: 4–13 July
- Yachts: 47
- Opening ceremony: 7 July

Competitors
- Competitors: 141
- Competing nations: 16

Results
- (gold) Gold: East Germany; Jochen Schümann; Thomas Flach; Bernd Jäkel
- (silver) Silver: Sweden; Lennart Persson; Eje Öberg; Tony Wallin
- (bronze) Bronze: West Germany; Thomas Jungblut; Thomas Maschkiwitz; Tim Kröger

Rank	Country	Helmsman	Crew	Sail No.	Race 1		Race 2		Race 3		Race 4		Race 5		Race 6		Race 7		Total	Total – discard
Rank	Country	Helmsman	Crew	Sail No.	Pos.	Pts.	Pos.	Pts.	Pos.	Pts.	Pos.	Pts.	Pos.	Pts.	Pos.	Pts.	Pos.	Pts.	Total	Total – discard
1st place, gold medalist(s)	GDR	Jochen Schümann	Bernd Jäkel; Thomas Flach	DDR 1	3	5.7	9	15.0	1	0.0	1	0.0	4	8.0	1	0.0	~~12~~	~~18.0~~	46.7	28.7
2nd place, silver medalist(s)	SWE	Lennart Persson	Eje Öberg; Tony Wallin	S 124	2	3.0	2	3.0	5	10.0	3	5.7	22	28.0	~~DSQ~~	~~54.0~~	1	0.0	103.7	49.7
3rd place, bronze medalist(s)	FRG	Thomas Jungblut	Thomas Maschkiwitz; Tim Kröger	G 254	4	8.0	~~10~~	~~16.0~~	10	16.0	5	10.0	3	5.7	2	3.0	4	8.0	66.7	50.7
4	GDR	Helmar Nauck	Norbert Hellreigel; Sven Diedering	DDR 4	1	0.0	~~25~~	~~31.0~~	20	26.0	11	17.0	1	0.0	5	10.0	3	5.7	89.7	58.7
5	GDR	Jörg Hermann	Carl Olbrich; Hermann	DDR 5	6	11.7	7	13.0	4	8.0	2	3.0	6	11.7	10	16.0	~~19~~	~~25.0~~	88.4	63.4
6	CAN	Bill Abbott Jr.	Larry Abbott; Don Beatty	KC 1	12	18.0	4	8.0	~~8~~	~~26.0~~	13	19.0	2	3.0	11	17.0	6	11.7	102.7	76.7
7	SWE	Hans Hamel	Malmgren; Jan-Olov Sandberg	S 130	20	26.0	3	5.7	~~25~~	~~31.0~~	8	14.0	10	16.0	15	21.0	2	3.0	116.7	85.7
8	GDR	Ralf Völker	Laurent Scheel; Steffen Voigt	DDR 3	16	22.0	1	0.0	3	5.7	~~DSQ~~	~~54.0~~	19	25.0	14	20.0	10	16.0	142.7	88.7
9	DEN	Jesper Bank	Jan Mathiasen; Steen Secher	D 83	~~PMS~~	~~54.0~~	6	11.7	2	3.0	18	24.0	11	17.0	22	28.0	5	10.0	147.7	93.7
10	ITA	Flavio Favini	Marco di Natale; Giorgio Passoni	I 223	19	25.0	21	27.0	11	17.0	7	13.0	~~23~~	~~29.0~~	3	5.7	8	14.0	130.7	101.7
11	FRG	Wolfgang Gerz	Andy Vinçon; Doersch	G 260	15	21.0	5	10.0	12	18.0	10	16.0	8	14.0	20	26.0	~~26~~	~~32.0~~	137.0	105.0
12	USA	Kevin Mahaney	Lance Mahaney; Cliff Nelson	US 772	~~25~~	~~31.0~~	12	18.0	9	15.0	24	30.0	9	15.0	8	14.0	13	19.0	142.0	111.0
13	FIN	Kenneth Thelen	Henrik Thelen; Juha Valtanen	L 48	~~24~~	~~30.0~~	16	22.0	16	22.0	4	8.0	18	24.0	6	11.7	17	23.0	140.7	110.7
14	CAN	Paul Thomson	Philip Gow; Stuart Flinn	KC 158	21	27.0	8	14.0	~~33~~	~~39.0~~	20	26.0	12	18.0	19	25.0	9	15.0	164.0	125.0
15	SWE	Patrick Spaengs	Lars Tornsten; Jaerudd	S 131	8	14.0	31	37.0	13	19.0	21	27.0	7	13.0	~~RET~~	~~54.0~~	11	17.0	181.0	127.0
16	ITA	Silvio Santoni	Fabio Toccoli; A. Ansaldi	I 220	7	13.0	13	19.0	37	43.0	12	18.0	~~DSQ~~	~~54.0~~	4	8.0	22	28.0	183.0	129.0
17	FRG	Jens-Peter Wrede	Stefan Knabe; Matthias Adamczewski	G 261	5	10.0	~~RET~~	~~54.0~~	PMS	54.0	9	15.0	5	10.0	7	13.0	29	35.0	191.0	137.0
18	FRG	Erich Hirt, Jr.	Frank Neufing; Haag	G 219	~~PMS~~	~~54.0~~	15	21.0	18	24.0	16	22.0	28	34.0	17	23.0	7	13.0	191.0	137.0
19	FRG	Jörg Diesch	Eckart Diesch; Rupert Diesch	G 264	~~PMS~~	~~54.0~~	11	17.0	30	36.0	17	23.0	17	23.0	12	18.0	15	21.0	192.0	138.0
20	AUS	Glen Collings	Warwick Anderson; Sam Snodgrass	KA 144	14	20.0	14	20.0	17	23.0	~~34~~	~~40.0~~	26	32.0	18	24.0	27	33.0	192.0	152.0
21	DEN	Jens Ranlov	Jens Hemmingsen; Blond	D 89	9	15.0	23	29.0	~~RET~~	~~54.0~~	30	36.0	27	33.0	9	15.0	25	31.0	213.0	159.0
22	NOR	Terje Wang	Jan Petterson; Bjørn Selander	N 104	10	16.0	20	26.0	28	34.0	15	21.0	37	43.0	~~32~~	~~38.0~~	23	29.0	207.0	164.0
23	NED	Ron van Manen	Rob Wiepjes; Harald Snater	H 24	~~PMS~~	~~54.0~~	18	24.0	26	32.0	33	39.0	13	19.0	YMP	28.2	21	27.0	223.2	169.2
24	AUT	Uli Strohschneider	Hannes Blaschke; Andreas Blaschke	OE 73	22	28.0	32	38.0	15	21.0	27	33.0	15	21.0	~~38~~	~~44.0~~	24	30.0	215.0	171.0
25	POL	Rychcik	Szymczak; Ploski	PZ 1	~~PMS~~	~~54.0~~	39	45.0	7	13.0	19	25.0	35	41.0	23	29.0	20	26.0	233.0	179.0
26	SWE	Rosengren	Flygare; Olsson	S 136	28	34.0	17	23.0	~~32~~	~~38.0~~	26	32.0	20	26.0	29	35.0	YMP	30.0	218.0	180.0
27	ITA	Marco Rodolfi	Besozzi; Guiseppe de Martino	I 194	~~DSQ~~	~~54.0~~	RET	54.0	6	11.7	25	31.0	16	22.0	13	19.0	RET	56.0	247.7	191.7
28	NOR	Ole Schoyen	Schoyen; Danielsen	N 102	~~PMS~~	~~54.0~~	29	35.0	35	41.0	6	11.7	14	20.0	26	32.0	RET	54.0	247.7	193.7
29	HUN	Rujak	L. Vajtai; Radics	M 18	~~PMS~~	~~54.0~~	35	41.0	22	28.0	22	28.0	RET	54.0	21	27.0	14	20.0	252.0	198.0
30	POL	J. Olszewski	R. Chybinski; J. Kwiecnski	PZ 4	30	36.0	24	30.0	14	20.0	23	29.0	38	44.0	33	39.0	~~RET~~	~~54.0~~	252.0	198.0
31	HUN	Miklós Tuss	G. Bankuty; Hatyka-Uar	M 81	11	17.0	34	40.0	31	37.0	32	38.0	21	27.0	34	40.0	~~37~~	~~43.0~~	242.0	199.0
32	SWE	Torbjorn Hansson	Hansson; Hansson	S 138	13	19.0	33	39.0	40	46.0	~~RET~~	~~54.0~~	25	31.0	25	31.0	30	36.0	256.0	202.0
33	GDR	Schwarzer	Bjorn Oestereich; Olaf Schütt	DDR 9	32	38.0	27	33.0	~~41~~	~~47.0~~	29	35.0	33	39.0	27	33.0	18	24.0	249.0	202.0
34	HUN	György Wossala	Boros; László Kovácsi	M 77	~~PMS~~	~~54.0~~	22	28.0	42	48.0	28	34.0	24	30.0	37	43.0	16	22.0	259.0	205.0
35	SWE	Martin Palsson	Klaas Mattsson; Rydholm	S 137	~~PMS~~	~~54.0~~	38	44.0	34	40.0	14	20.0	36	42.0	16	22.0	33	39.0	261.0	207.0
36	GDR	Dieter Below	Ziems; Kankel	DDR 11	29	35.0	19	25.0	29	35.0	31	37.0	34	40.0	~~35~~	~~41.0~~	31	37.0	250.0	209.0
37	GBR	William Henderson	Squire; Squire	K 133	18	24.0	~~40~~	~~46.0~~	27	33.0	35	41.0	29	35.0	40	46.0	28	34.0	259.0	213.0
38	FRG	Karl Haist	Christian Pauksch; S. Nikolaus	G 252	~~DSQ~~	~~54.0~~	28	34.0	21	27.0	38	44.0	39	45.0	28	34.0	32	38.0	276.0	222.0
39	SWE	Martin Hedlund	Suerlinger; Rolf Mattsson	S 132	17	23.0	30	36.0	23	29.0	39	45.0	32	38.0	~~DNC~~	~~54.0~~	DSQ	54.0	279.0	225.0
40	NED	Rudy den Outer	Job Westening; Martin Debel	H 22	33	39.0	26	32.0	36	42.0	~~40~~	~~46.0~~	32	38.0	30	36.0	35	41.0	274.0	228.0
41	NED	Frank Verhagen	Dick van der Vaart; Bob Smolders	H 21	31	37.0	41	47.0	24	30.0	~~RET~~	~~54.0~~	30	36.0	24	30.0	RET	54.0	288.0	234.0
42	SWE	Per Cederholm	Alnebeck; Cederholm	S 128	27	33.0	37	43.0	38	44.0	37	43.0	~~41~~	~~47.0~~	39	45.0	36	42.0	297.0	250.0
43	SWE	Mats Persson	Petersson; Göran Alm	S 118	26	32.0	~~DSQ~~	~~54.0~~	43	49.0	36	42.0	RET	54.0	31	37.0	34	40.0	308.0	254.0
44	ITA	Ciferri	Mondani; Sibilla	I 201	~~PMS~~	~~54.0~~	RET	54.0	19	25.0	41	47.0	40	46.0	36	42.0	RET	54.0	322.0	268.0
45	GBR	Glyn Charles	Andy Beadsworth; Burgin	K 131	23	29.0	36	42.0	39	45.0	~~RET~~	~~54.0~~	PMS	54.0	41	47.0	RET	54.0	325.0	271.0
46	FRG	Dieter Meusinger	Brinkmann; Brodersen	G 202	34	40.0	42	48.0	44	50.0	~~RET~~	~~54.0~~	42	48.0	DNC	54.0	DNC	54.0	348.0	294.0
47	ESP	Guillermo Altadill	Valades; Catrio	E 140	~~RET~~	~~54.0~~	DNC	54.0	DNC	54.0	DNC	54.0	DNC	54.0	DNC	54.0	DNC	54.0	378.0	324.0

Legend: DNF – Did not finish; DNS – Did not start; DSQ – Disqualified; RET – Retired; YMP – Yacht materially prejudiced;
Discard is crossed out and does not count for the overall result.

- 1986 Progress

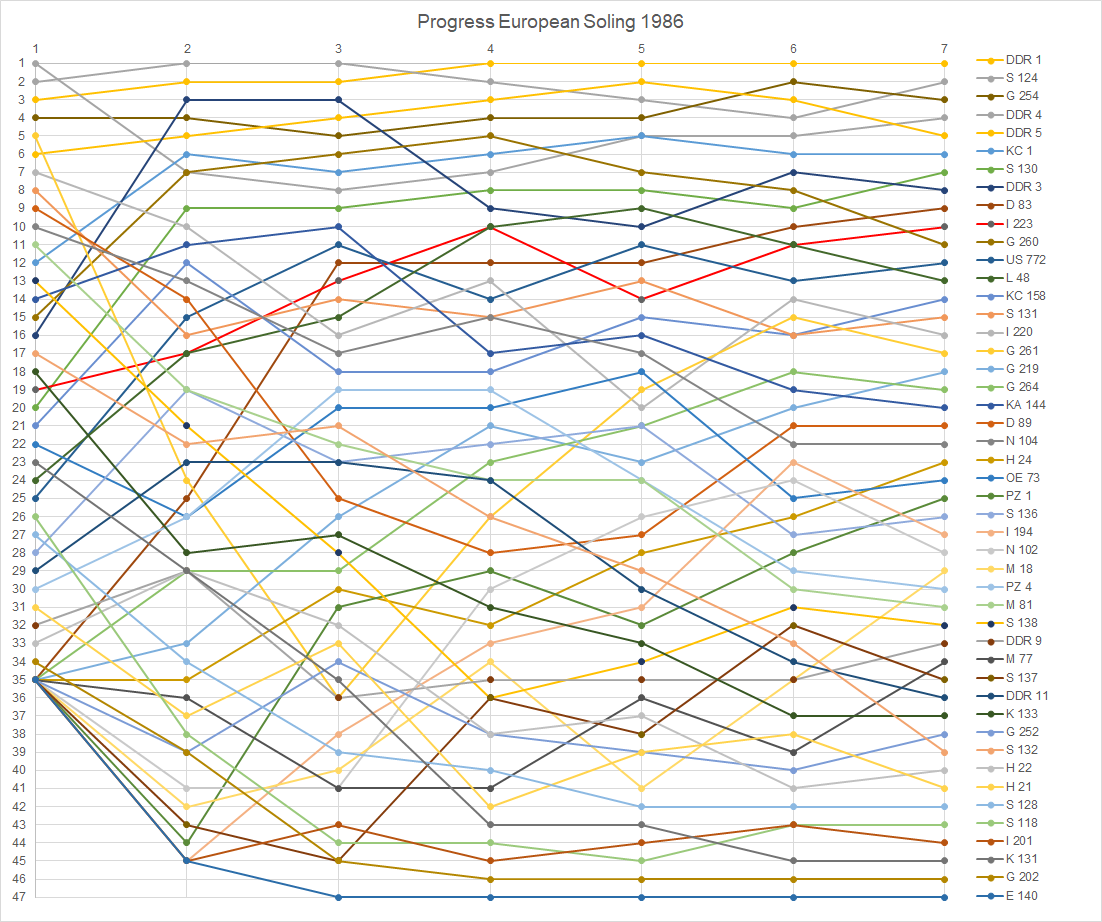

== 1987 Final results ==
1987
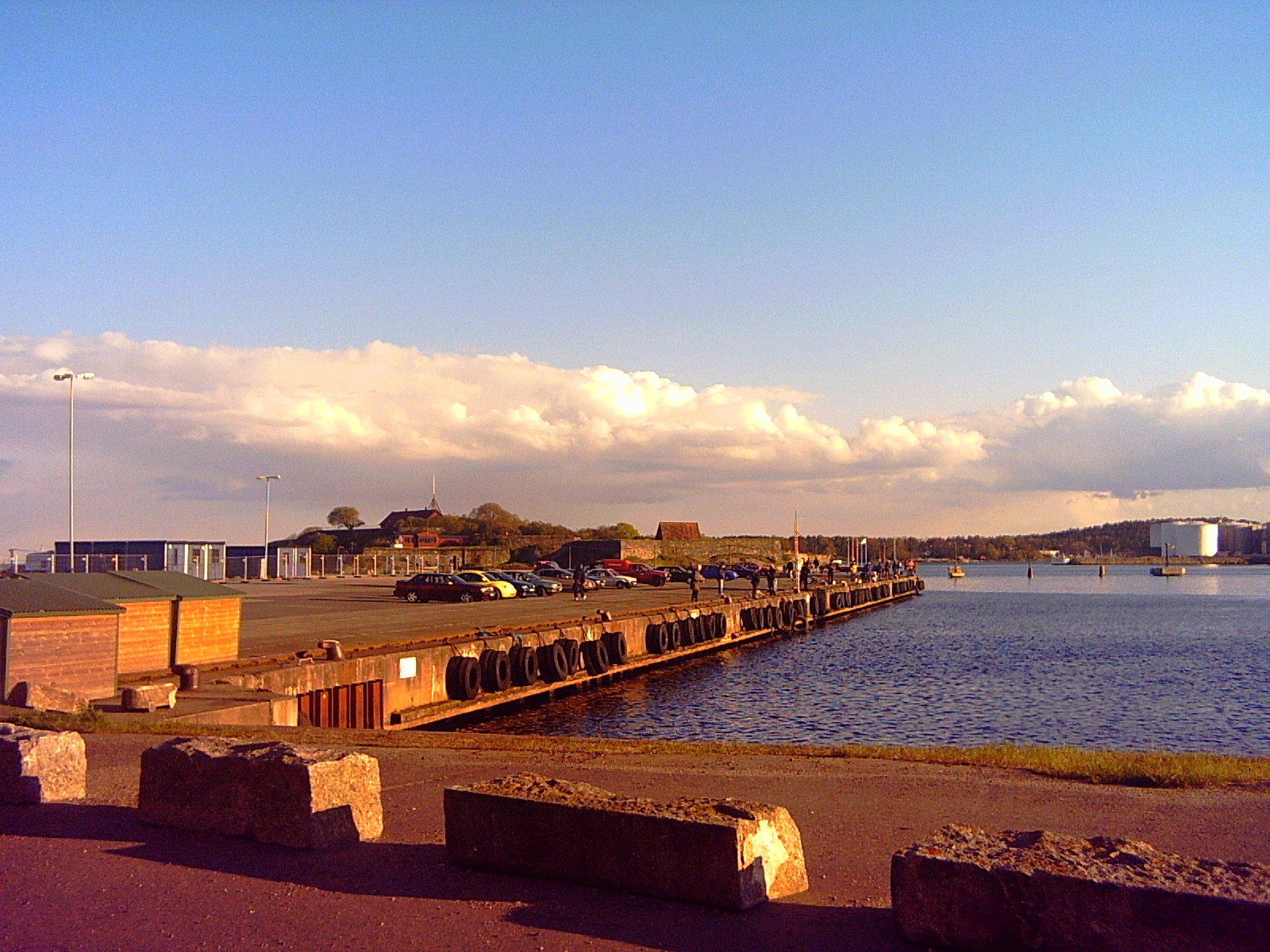

Event title
- Edition: 20
- Host: Karlshamns Segelsällskap

Event details
- Venue: Karlshamn, Sweden
- Dates: 28 August - 6 September
- Yachts: 51
- Opened by: Lars-Johan Norrby, Sweden
- Opening ceremony: 31 August

Competitors
- Competitors: 153
- Competing nations: 17

Results
- (gold) Gold: Soviet Union; Georgy Shayduko; Sergey Kanov; Nikolay Polyakov
- (silver) Silver: East Germany; Jochen Schümann; Thomas Flach; Bernd Jäkel
- (bronze) Bronze: Canada; Hans Fogh; Steve Calder; Hank Lammens

Rank	Country	Helmsman	Crew	Sail No.	Race 1		Race 2		Race 3		Race 4		Race 5		Race 6		Race 7		Total	Total – discard
Rank	Country	Helmsman	Crew	Sail No.	Pos.	Pts.	Pos.	Pts.	Pos.	Pts.	Pos.	Pts.	Pos.	Pts.	Pos.	Pts.	Pos.	Pts.	Total	Total – discard
1st place, gold medalist(s)	URS	Georgy Shayduko	Nikolay Polyakov; Sergey Kanov	SR 41	3	5.7	2	3.0	8	14.0	15	21.0	1	0.0	3	5.7	~~DSQ~~	~~58.0~~	107.4	49.4
2nd place, silver medalist(s)	GDR	Jochen Schümann	Bernd Jäkel; Thomas Flach	DDR 1	4	8.0	7	13.0	6	11.7	1	0.0	~~15~~	~~21.0~~	2	3.0	11	17.0	73.7	52.7
3rd place, bronze medalist(s)	CAN	Hans Fogh	Steve Calder; Hank Lammens	KC 181	2	3.0	~~27~~	~~33.0~~	18	24.0	2	3.0	10	16.0	12	18.0	2	3.0	100.0	67.0
4	GBR	Chris Law	Edward Leask; Jeremy Richards	K 143	7	13.0	10	16.0	21	27.0	~~RET~~	~~58.0~~	21	27.0	1	0.0	4	8.0	149.0	91.0
5	USA	B. Cobb	Green; Hopkins	US 997	1	0.0	12	18.0	~~27~~	~~33.0~~	22	28.0	6	11.7	16	22.0	6	11.7	124.4	91.4
6	GRE	Tassos Boudouris	Dimitrios Deligiannis; D. Benakis	GR 69	19	25.0	3	5.7	23	29.0	~~DSQ~~	~~58.0~~	7	13.0	8	14.0	3	5.7	150.4	92.4
7	GDR	Helmar Nauck	Norbert Hellriegel; Sven Diedering	DDR 4	15	21.0	~~19~~	~~25.0~~	15	21.0	YMP	10.0	4	8.0	5	10.0	14	20.0	115.0	90.0
8	FRG	Jörg Diesch	Eckart Diesch; Rupert Diesch	G 259	14	20.0	1	0.0	4	8.0	6	11.7	~~27~~	~~33.0~~	25	31.0	20	26.0	129.7	96.7
9	GDR	Völker	Laurent Scheel; Steffen Voigt	DDR 3	5	10.0	17	23.0	~~20~~	~~26.0~~	11	17.0	5	10.0	7	13.0	19	25.0	124.0	98.0
10	DEN	Jesper Bank	Steen Secher; Jan Mathiasen	D 92	9	15.0	20	26.0	~~29~~	~~35.0~~	YMP	11.4.0	12	18.0	9	15.0	7	13.0	133.4	98.4
11	FRG	Thomas Jungblut	Thomas Maschkiwitz; Tim Kröger	G 269	22	28.0	18	24.0	~~26~~	~~32.0~~	8	14.0	8	14.0	11	17.0	5	10.0	139.0	107.0
12	NZL	Russell Coutts	Phillamore; Chistian Robinson	KZ 20	8	14.0	6	11.7	17	23.0	~~DSQ~~	~~58.0~~	19	25.0	14	20.0	9	15.0	166.7	108.7
13	FIN	Tom Jungell	M. Mannstrom; S. Harima	L 47	17	23.0	23	29.0	19	25.0	10	16.0	~~RET~~	~~58.0~~	10	16.0	1	0.0	167.0	109.0
14	ITA	Marco Rodolfl	Guiseppe de Martino; Bergamaschi	I 194	10	16.0	25	31.0	25	31.0	3	5.7	3	5.7	17	23.0	~~34~~	~~40.0~~	152.4	112.4
15	SWE	Lennart Persson	Eje Öberg; Tony Wallin	S 124	18	24.0	14	20.0	11	17.0	YMP	14.2.0	20	26.0	~~DSQ~~	~~58.0~~	8	14.0	173.2	115.2
16	FRG	Jens-Peter Wrede	Stefan Knabe; Matthias Adamczewski	G 261	26	32.0	28	34.0	~~32~~	~~38.0~~	32	38.0	2	3.0	4	8.0	12	18.0	171.0	133.0
17	SWE	Martin Palsson	Klaas Mattsson; Wiskman	S 137	22	28.0	24	30.0	9	15.0	30	36.0	17	23.0	~~33~~	~~39.0~~	10	16.0	187.0	148.0
18	CAN	Bill Abbott Jr.	Bill Abbott Sr. Larry Abbott	KC 1	46	52.0	13	19.0	12	18.0	13	19.0	13	19.0	6	11.7	~~PMS~~	~~58.0~~	196.7	138.7
19	NED	Ron van Manen	Gert Kwlkkers; Dick van der Vaart	H 26	~~39~~	~~45.0~~	5	10.0	5	10.0	29	35.0	22	28.0	19	25.0	26	32.0	185.0	140.0
20	FIN	Lundberg	Borenlus; Jansson	L 50	33	39.0	26	32.0	1	0.0	~~37~~	~~43.0~~	23	29.0	13	19.0	27	33.0	195.0	152.0
21	FIN	Kenneth Thelen	Henrik Thelen; Juha Valtanen	L 48	~~41~~	~~47.0~~	35	41.0	30	36.0	12	18.0	14	20.0	23	29.0	13	19.0	210.0	163.0
22	NOR	Dag Usterud	Johansen; Børre Skui	N 111	34	40.0	~~RET~~	~~58.0~~	3	5.7	5	10.0	24	30.0	40	46.0	28	34.0	223.7	165.7
23	GBR	Glyn Charles	Andy Beadsworth; Robert Cruickshank	K 146	12	18.0	9	15.0	~~37~~	~~43.0~~	23	29.0	36	42.0	27	33.0	23	29.0	209.0	166.0
24	FRA	Chourgnoz	Herpin; Pelegrin	F 150	13	19.0	34	40.0	16	22.0	19	25.0	~~DSQ~~	~~58.0~~	15	21.0	36	42.0	227.0	169.0
25	ITA	Flavio Favini	Giorgio Passoni; Marco di Natale	I 223	21	27.0	8	14.0	28	34.0	4	8.0	~~DSQ~~	~~58.0~~	YMP	22.2.0	DSQ	58.0	221.2	163.2
26	SWE	Hans Hamel	Jan-Olov Sandberg; Malmgren	S 130	20	26.0	29	35.0	22	28.0	9	15.0	26	32.0	28	34.0	~~31~~	~~37.0~~	207.0	170.0
27	ITA	Gianluca Lamaro	Aurelio Dalla Vecchia; Valerio Romano	I 209	32	38.0	4	8.0	2	3.0	20	26.0	~~DSQ~~	~~58.0~~	34	40.0	DNS	58.0	231.0	173.0
28	NED	Fred Imhoff	Frank Steeneken; John Hofland	H 25	35	41.0	31	37.0	10	16.0	7	13.0	~~DSQ~~	~~58.0~~	39	45.0	15	21.0	231.0	173.0
29	FRG	Erich Hirt, Jr.	Roman Koch; Maxl Koch	G 275	37	43.0	~~39~~	~~45.0~~	7	13.0	26	32.0	16	22.0	22	28.0	29	35.0	218.0	173.0
30	SWE	Martin Grävare	Eric Wallin; Magnus Grävare	S 128	16	22.0	33	39.0	~~43~~	~~49.0~~	25	31.0	9	15.0	21	27.0	33	39.0	222.0	173.0
31	NOR	Terje Wang	Malm; Jan Petterson	N 104	38	44.0	30	36.0	13	19.0	16	22.0	11	17.0	29	35.0	~~PMS~~	~~58.0~~	231.0	173.0
32	SWE	Gidfors	Pettersson; Gille	S 133	23	29.0	21	27.0	36	42.0	~~41~~	~~47.0~~	18	24.0	24	30.0	22	28.0	227.0	180.0
33	SWE	Magnus Holmberg	Abenlus; Jan Holmqvist	S 135	28	34.0	16	22.0	~~41~~	~~47.0~~	35	41.0	25	31.0	30	36.0	21	27.0	238.0	191.0
34	NOR	Ole Schoyen	Schoyen; Danielsen	N 102	36	42.0	22	28.0	31	37.0	~~DSQ~~	~~58.0~~	34	40.0	18	24.0	18	24.0	253.0	195.0
35	AUT	Uli Strohschneider	Hannes Blaschke; Georg Stadler	OE 73	~~44~~	~~50.0~~	15	21.0	34	40.0	39	45.0	35	41.0	36	42.0	17	23.0	262.0	212.0
36	NED	Rudy den Outer	Theo de Lange; Robert Molsbergen	H 22	24	30.0	40	46.0	38	44.0	24	30.0	30	36.0	~~42~~	~~48.0~~	24	30.0	264.0	216.0
37	GBR	Philip Crebbin	Falkner; Munge	K 138	~~47~~	~~53.0~~	32	38.0	44	50.0	18	24.0	28	34.0	26	32.0	35	41.0	272.0	219.0
38	ITA	Ciferri	Ravarotto; Mondani	I 201	27	33.0	~~43~~	~~49.0~~	14	20.0	33	39.0	39	45.0	35	41.0	37	43.0	270.0	221.0
39	SWE	Rosengren	Munck; Olsson	S 136	43	49.0	~~44~~	~~50.0~~	42	48.0	31	37.0	38	44.0	20	26.0	16	22.0	276.0	226.0
40	POL	Rychnik	Szymczak; Pioskl	PZ 7	6	11.7	46	52.0	48	54.0	28	34.0	33	39.0	~~PMS~~	~~58.0~~	30	36.0	284.7	226.7
41	DEN	Jens Ranlov	Jens Hemmingsen; Besser	D 89	29	35.0	38	44.0	33	39.0	~~PMS~~	~~58.0~~	29	35.0	31	37.0	32	38.0	286.0	228.0
42	AUT	Michael Farthofer	Rudolf Matheis; Michael Luschan	OE 83	30	36.0	47	53.0	24	30.0	14	20.0	37	43.0	45	51.0	~~RET~~	~~58.0~~	291.0	233.0
43	SWE	Mats Persson	Petersson; Göran Alm	S 118	~~PMS~~	~~58.0~~	36	42.0	39	45.0	38	44.0	32	38.0	32	38.0	25	31.0	296.0	238.0
44	SWE	Nilsson	Malm; Persson	S 121	25	31.0	37	43.0	35	41.0	36	42.0	41	47.0	37	43.0	~~PMS~~	~~58.0~~	305.0	247.0
45	NZL	Gibson	Fieury; Conroy	KZ 28	31	37.0	~~49~~	~~55.0~~	45	51.0	40	46.0	31	37.0	38	44.0	38	44.0	314.0	259.0
46	SWE	Rylander	Norden; Elvstrom	S 129	~~RET~~	~~58.0~~	41	47.0	47	53.0	17	23.0	DSQ	58.0	41	47.0	39	45.0	331.0	273.0
47	SWE	Torbjorn	Torbjorn Hansson; Hansson	S 138	40	46.0	11	17.0	~~RET~~	~~58.0~~	DNC	58.0	DNC	58.0	DNC	58.0	DNC	58.0	353.0	295.0
48	NOR	Birger Lie	Faeste; Faeste	N 87	42	48.0	45	51.0	40	46.0	~~DSQ~~	~~58.0~~	40	46.0	43	49.0	RET	58.0	356.0	298.0
49	ITA	F. D'Adda	D'Adda; Chiandussi	I 210	~~49~~	~~55.0~~	48	54.0	46	52.0	42	48.0	43	49.0	47	53.0	41	47.0	358.0	303.0
50	AUT	Rudolf Schuh	Werkgartner; Lucan-Stood	OE 59	48	54.0	~~50~~	~~56.0~~	50	56.0	43	49.0	42	48.0	46	52.0	40	46.0	361.0	305.0
51	DEN	Hold	Larsen; Walter	D 81	45	51.0	42	48.0	49	55.0	~~RET~~	~~58.0~~	44	50.0	44	50.0	RET	58.0	370.0	312.0

Legend: DNF – Did not finish; DNS – Did not start; DSQ – Disqualified; RET – Retired;
Discard is crossed out and does not count for the overall result.

- 1987 Progress

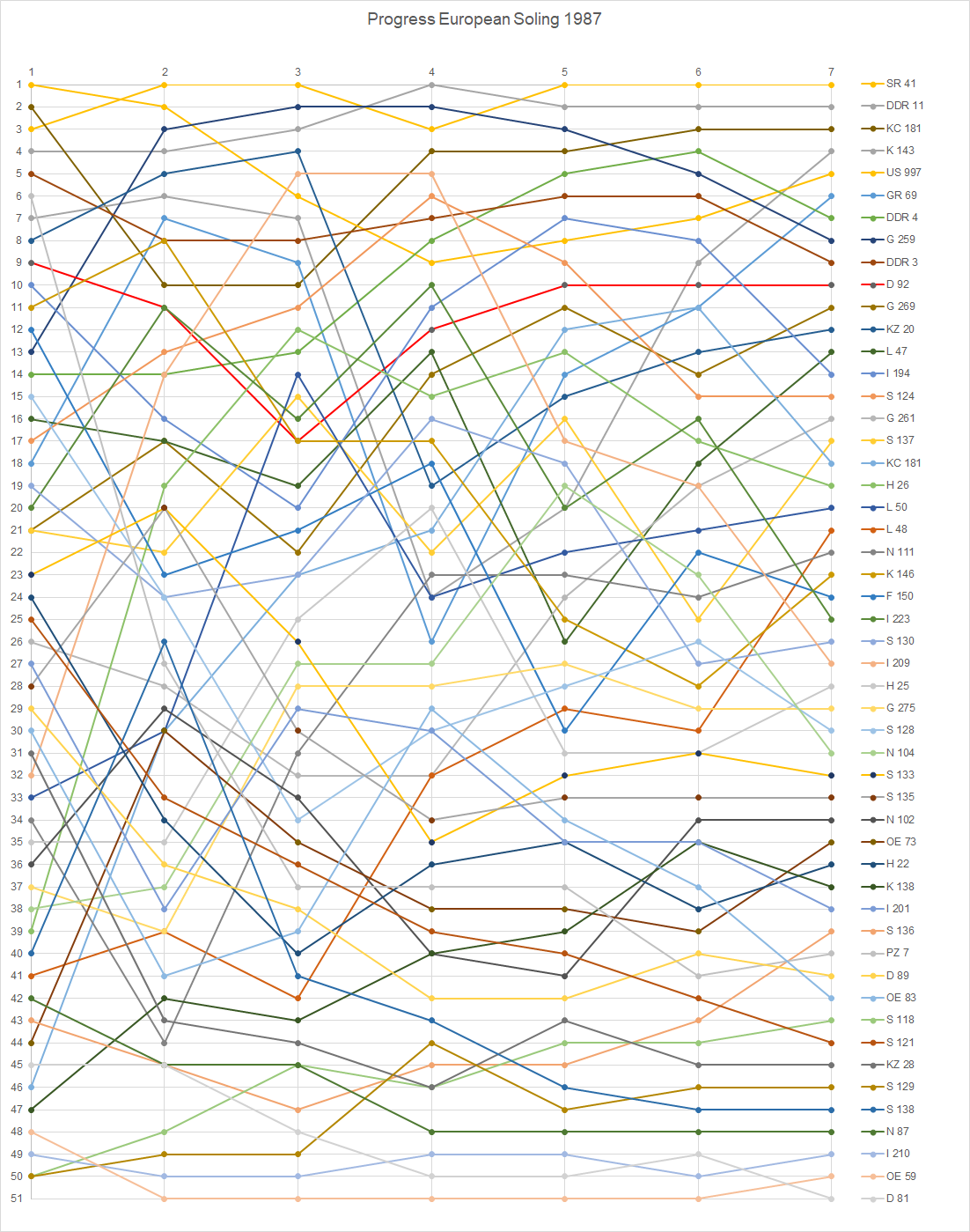

== 1988 Final Results ==
1988
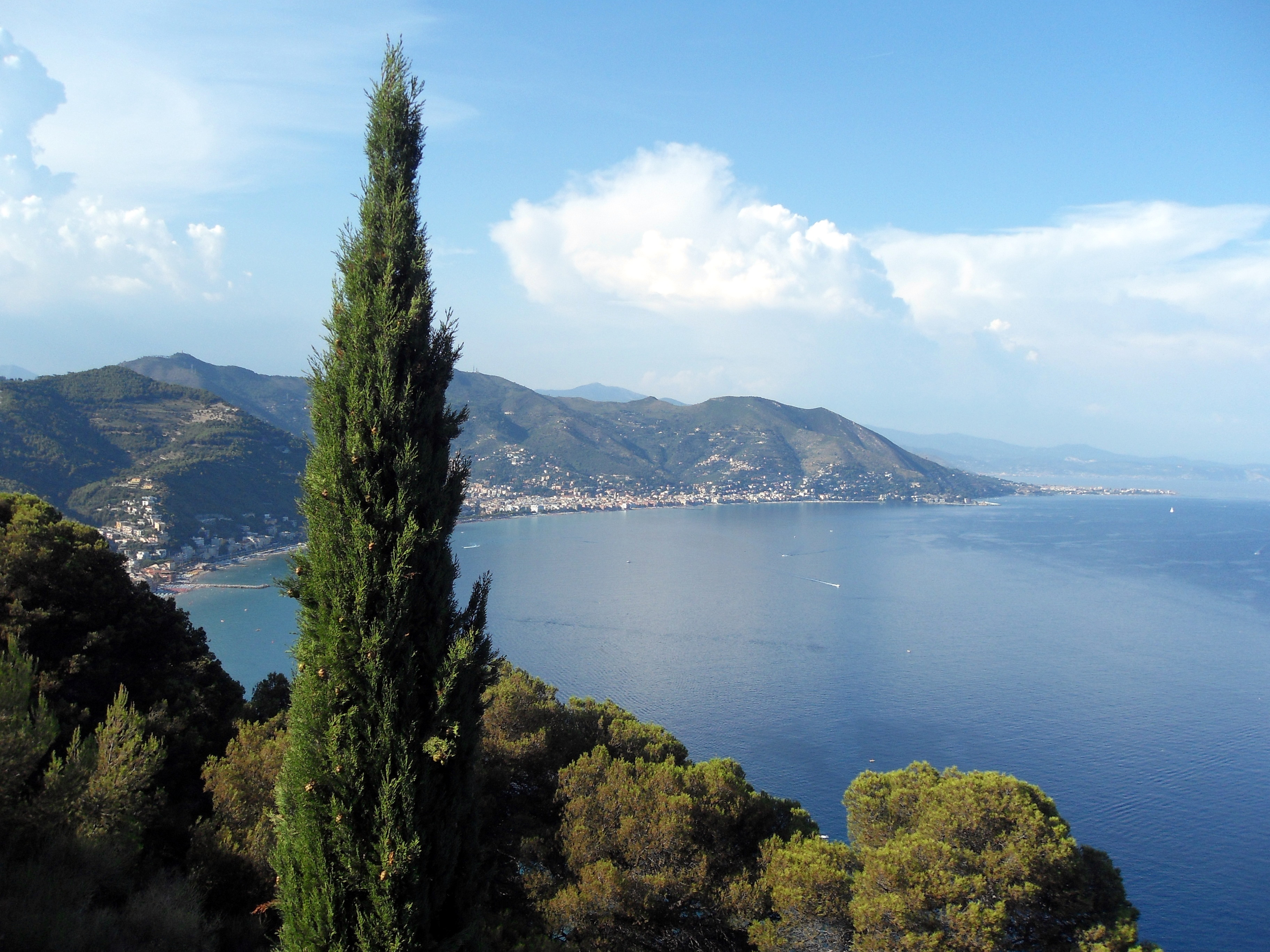

Event title
- Edition: 21
- Host: Il Circolo Nautico Al Mare di Alassio, CNAM

Event details
- Venue: Alassio, Italy
- Dates: 8–14 May
- Yachts: 63
- Opening ceremony: 7 May

Competitors
- Competitors: 189
- Competing nations: 20

Results
- (gold) Gold: East Germany; Jochen Schümann; Thomas Flach; Bernd Jäkel
- (silver) Silver: United States; John Kostecki; William Baylis; Bob Billingham
- (bronze) Bronze: Denmark; Jesper Bank; Jan Mathiasen; Steen Secher

Rank	Country	Helmsman	Crew	Sail No.	Race 1		Race 2		Race 3		Race 4		Race 5		Race 6		Total	Total – discard
Rank	Country	Helmsman	Crew	Sail No.	Pos.	Pts.	Pos.	Pts.	Pos.	Pts.	Pos.	Pts.	Pos.	Pts.	Pos.	Pts.	Total	Total – discard
1st place, gold medalist(s)	GDR	Jochen Schümann	Thomas Flach; Bernd Jäkel	DDR 1	16	22.0	1	0.0	7	13.0	~~18~~	~~24.0~~	1	0.0	4	8.0	67.0	43.0
2nd place, silver medalist(s)	USA	John Kostecki	Robert Billingham; William Baylis	US 736	6	11.7	2	3.0	21	27.0	~~26~~	~~32.0~~	4	8.0	1	0.0	81.7	49.7
3rd place, bronze medalist(s)	DEN	Jesper Bank	Steen Secher; Jan Mathiasen	D 92	8	14.0	13	19.0	8	14.0	4	8.0	3	5.7	~~14~~	~~20.0~~	80.7	60.7
4	GDR	Helmar Nauck	Norbert Hellriegel; Sven Diedering	DDR 4	3	5.7	5	10.0	~~37~~	~~43.0~~	9	15.0	6	11.7	18	24.0	109.4	66.4
5	CAN	Paul Thomson	Philip Gow; Stuart Flinn	KC 182	4	8.0	15	21.0	~~19~~	~~25.0~~	13	19.0	17	23.0	3	5.7	101.7	76.7
6	AUS	Bob Wilmot	Glenn Read; Matthew Percy	KA 170	21	27.0	3	5.7	35	26.0	~~39~~	~~45.0~~	2	3.0	2	3.0	109.7	64.7
7	SWE	Lennart Persson	Tony Wallin; Eje Öberg	S 124	9	15.0	~~17~~	~~23.0~~	4	8.0	17	23.0	16	22.0	10	16.0	107.0	84.0
8	CAN	Hans Fogh	Peter Hall; Steve Calder	KC 181	10	16.0	18	24.0	~~31~~	~~37.0~~	2	3.0	26	32.0	8	14.0	126.0	89.0
9	URS	Serhiy Pichuhin	Gennedi Strach; Oleg Miron	SR 33	18	24.0	12	18.0	12	18.0	3	5.7	20	26.0	~~24~~	~~30.0~~	121.7	91.7
10	URS	Georgy Shayduko	Nikolay Polyakov; Sergey Kanov	SR 41	27	33.0	~~21~~	~~27.0~~	1	0.0	7	13.0	15	21.0	26	32.0	126.0	93.0
11	ITA	Tommaso Chieffi	Enrico Chieffi; Luca Bontempelli	I 193	2	3.0	9	15.0	16	22.0	21	27.0	~~RET~~	~~70.0~~	23	29.0	166.0	96.0
12	USA	Kevin Mahaney	Nelson; Wislar	US 787	5	10.0	~~DSQ~~	~~70.0~~	33	39.0	14	20.0	8	14.0	9	15.0	168.0	98.0
13	ITA	Gianluca Lamaro	Aurelio Dalla Vecchia; Valerio Romano	I 209	19	25.0	~~DSQ~~	~~70.0~~	6	11.7	19	25.0	12	18.0	13	19.0	168.7	98.7
14	GDR	Jörg Hermann	Carl Olbrich; Hermann	DDR 5	17	23.0	6	11.7	~~40~~	~~46.0~~	30	36.0	11	17.0	6	11.7	145.4	99.4
15	BRA	José Paulo Dias	Daniel Adler; José Augusto Dias	BL 45	14	20.0	19	25.0	22	28.0	~~34~~	~~40.0~~	14	20.0	11	17.0	150.0	110.0
16	USA	Chris Mason	Andy Green; Bulkingham	US 716	15	21.0	16	22.0	5	10.0	32	38.0	~~RET~~	~~70.0~~	15	21.0	182.0	112.0
17	NOR	Terje Wang	Jan Petterson; Erling Landsværk	N 107	~~41~~	~~47.0~~	23	29.0	2	3.0	20	26.0	25	31.0	20	26.0	162.0	115.0
18	GBR	Glyn Charles	Robert Cruickshank; Andy Beadsworth	K 146	20	26.0	26	32.0	~~34~~	~~40.0~~	31	37.0	9	15.0	5	10.0	160.0	120.0
19	ESP	Antonio Gorostegui	Mancei; Jairne	E 140	13	19.0	30	36.0	3	5.7	~~44~~	~~50.0~~	21	27.0	29	35.0	172.7	122.7
20	CAN	Bill Abbott Jr.	Larry Abbott; Don Beatty	KC 1	22	28.0	25	31.0	~~DSQ~~	~~70.0~~	5	10.0	27	33.0	16	22.0	194.0	124.0
21	ITA	Flavio Favini	Di Natale; Alberto Marelli	I 234	7	13.0	22	28.0	~~49~~	~~55.0~~	22	28.0	33	39.0	12	18.0	181.0	126.0
22	ITA	Francesco de Angelis	Perrone Capano; Giorgio Passoni	I 232	31	37.0	27	33.0	15	21.0	~~40~~	~~46.0~~	22	28.0	7	13.0	178.0	132.0
23	GBR	Lawrie Smith	Jeremy Richards; Edward Leask	K 141	37	43.0	10	16.0	~~42~~	~~48.0~~	10	16.0	5	10.0	42	48.0	161.2	113.2
24	FIN	Tom Jungell	Mannstrom; S. Harima	L 47	~~RET~~	~~70.0~~	24	30.0	10	16.0	36	42.0	19	25.0	17	23.0	206.0	136.0
25	NOR	Dag Usterud	Johansen; Eriksen	N 111	1	0.0	8	14.0	60	66.0	~~DSQ~~	~~70.0~~	28	34.0	19	25.0	209.0	139.0
26	FRG	Erich Hirt, Jr.	Roman Koch; Maxl Koch	G 275	~~38~~	~~44.0~~	35	41.0	14	20.0	12	18.0	18	24.0	32	38.0	185.0	141.0
27	SWE	Martin Palsson	Klaas Mattsson; Wiskam	S 140	~~RET~~	~~70.0~~	14	20.0	47	53.0	8	14.0	23	29.0	21	27.0	213.0	143.0
28	SWE	Per Ahlby	Collberg; Svensson	S 132	~~44~~	~~50.0~~	37	43.0	18	24.0	6	11.7	30	36.0	28	34.0	198.7	148.7
29	DEN	Valdemar Bandolowski	Leroy; Larsen	D 94	30	36.0	11	17.0	11	17.0	45	51.0	24	30.0	~~DNS~~	~~70.0~~	221.0	151.0
30	NED	Ron van Manen	Gert Kwikkers; Dick van der Vaart	H 26	39	45.0	33	39.0	~~PMS~~	~~70.0~~	1	0.0	34	40.0	30	36.0	230.0	160.0
31	DEN	Morten Henriksen	Anderson; Per Petterson	D 96	35	41.0	~~36~~	~~42.0~~	23	29.0	35	41.0	13	19.0	25	31.0	203.0	161.0
32	JPN	Kazunori Komatsu	Kazuo Hanaoka; Tadashi Ikeda	J 33	11	17.0	~~RET~~	~~70.0~~	50	56.0	24	30.0	7	13.0	40	46.0	232.0	162.0
33	GBR	Rory Bowman	Stevens; Ingram	K 147	34	40.0	~~42~~	~~48.0~~	9	15.0	15	21.0	41	47.0	39	45.0	216.0	168.0
34	NOR	Ole Schoyen	Schoyen; Danielsen	N 102	32	38.0	32	38.0	17	23.0	29	35.0	29	35.0	~~34~~	~~40.0~~	209.0	169.0
35	FIN	Lundberg	Borenius; Jansson	L 50	42	48.0	31	37.0	~~56~~	~~62.0~~	42	48.0	10	16.0	22	28.0	239.0	177.0
36	SWE	Mats Persson	Petersson; Göran Alm	S 118	~~RET~~	~~70.0~~	29	35.0	29	35.0	28	34.0	32	38.0	31	37.0	249.0	179.0
37	ITA	Federico Stopani	Ribolli; Bonsignore	I 223	23	29.0	39	45.0	26	32.0	~~55~~	~~61.0~~	37	43.0	27	33.0	243.0	182.0
38	AUT	Uli Strohschneider	Hannes Blaschke; Georg Stadler	OE 73	26	32.0	20	26.0	46	52.0	~~50~~	~~56.0~~	31	37.0	33	39.0	242.0	186.0
39	HUN	Rujak	Ori; G. Bankuty	M 18	28	34.0	7	13.0	36	42.0	53	59.0	35	41.0	~~RET~~	~~70.0~~	259.0	189.0
40	GRE	Tassos Boudouris	Dimitris; Dimitrios Deligiannis	GR 31	12	18.0	~~RET~~	~~70.0~~	13	19.0	11	17.0	DNS	70.0	DNS	70.0	264.0	194.0
41	SWE	Loven	Torbjorn Hansson; Hansson	S 138	43	49.0	38	44.0	27	33.0	~~48~~	~~54.0~~	39	45.0	36	42.0	267.0	213.0
42	FIN	Kenneth Thelen	Henrik Thelen; Juha Valtanen	L 48	~~RET~~	~~70.0~~	4	8.0	28	34.0	27	33.0	RET	70.0	DNS	70.0	285.0	215.0
43	GRE	Dimov	Giaridis; Giamnipis	GR 30	~~46~~	~~52.0~~	46	52.0	25	31.0	41	47.0	40	46.0	37	43.0	271.0	219.0
44	POR	Antonio Tanger	Beckers; Joao Cabecados	P 9	47	53.0	43	49.0	20	26.0	~~52~~	~~58.0~~	43	49.0	41	47.0	282.0	224.0
45	NED	Rudy den Outer	Theo de Lange; Robert Molsbergen	H 22	36	42.0	41	47.0	~~52~~	~~58.0~~	47	53.0	36	42.0	35	41.0	283.0	225.0
46	HUN	György Wossala	László Kovácsi; Radics	M 77	48	54.0	47	53.0	24	30.0	16	22.0	~~RET~~	~~70.0~~	DNS	70.0	299.0	229.0
47	SWE	Gidfors	Gille; Jansson	S 133	45	51.0	28	34.0	30	36.0	38	44.0	~~DNS~~	~~70.0~~	DNS	70.0	305.0	235.0
48	SWE	Hans Hamel	Jan-Olov Sandberg; Malmgren	S 130	29	35.0	34	40.0	57	63.0	25	31.0	~~DNS~~	~~70.0~~	DNS	70.0	309.0	239.0
49	SUI	Diday	Grimm; Buriquet	Z 269	49	55.0	40	46.0	45	51.0	23	29.0	~~DNS~~	~~70.0~~	DNS	70.0	321.0	251.0
50	ITA	Wolleb	Musso; Lombardo	I 227	54	60.0	44	50.0	~~55~~	~~61.0~~	46	52.0	42	48.0	38	44.0	315.0	254.0
51	SWE	Magnus Holmberg	Hallquist; Jan Holmqvist	S 135	24	30.0	~~PMS~~	~~70.0~~	39	45.0	34	40.0	DNS	70.0	DNS	70.0	325.0	255.0
52	AUT	Carl Auteried Jr.	Herner; Neufing	OE 97	33	39.0	~~RET~~	~~70.0~~	54	60.0	37	43.0	38	44.0	RET	70.0	326.0	256.0
53	SUI	Giugnard	Perret; J.D. Gendre	Z 259	51	57.0	48	54.0	44	50.0	33	39.0	~~DNS~~	~~70.0~~	DNS	70.0	340.0	270.0
54	SUI	Ami Blanc	Jean-Paul Marmier; Jacot	Z 234	58	64.0	51	57.0	38	44.0	51	57.0	44	50.0	~~DNS~~	~~70.0~~	342.0	272.0
55	SUI	Munier	Owen; Oergerli	Z 220	53	59.0	53	59.0	41	47.0	56	62.0	45	51.0	~~DNS~~	~~70.0~~	348.0	278.0
56	USA	Stuart H. Walker	Dunn; Philips	US 725	25	31.0	~~PMS~~	~~70.0~~	53	59.0	49	55.0	DNS	70.0	DNS	70.0	355.0	285.0
57	SWE	Rylander	Norden; Nilsson	S 142	50	56.0	45	51.0	32	38.0	~~DSQ~~	~~70.0~~	DNS	70.0	DNS	70.0	355.0	285.0
58	NOR	Rune Jacobsen	Andersen; Stair	N 104	40	46.0	~~RET~~	~~70.0~~	43	49.0	54	60.0	DNS	70.0	DNS	70.0	365.0	295.0
59	SUI	Heiki Blok	Schmid; Stump	Z 267	52	58.0	49	55.0	58	64.0	57	63.0	~~DNS~~	~~70.0~~	DNS	70.0	380.0	310.0
60	ITA	F. D'Adda	D'Adda; Chiandussi	I 210	56	62.0	52	58.0	51	57.0	58	64.0	~~DNS~~	~~70.0~~	DNS	70.0	381.0	311.0
61	SUI	Christian Grimm (sailor)	M. Grimm; Vauthey	Z 258	55	61.0	~~DNS~~	~~70.0~~	48	54.0	RET	70.0	DNS	70.0	DNS	70.0	395.0	325.0
62	SUI	Schaer	Sintes; Jeanneret	Z 264	~~RET~~	~~70.0~~	50	56.0	61	67.0	RET	70.0	DNS	70.0	DNS	70.0	403.0	333.0
63	ITA	Bianchi	Corrado Cristaldini; Terenzi	I 215	57	63.0	~~DNS~~	~~70.0~~	59	65.0	DNS	70.0	DNS	70.0	DNS	70.0	408.0	338.0

Legend: DNF – Did not finish; DNS – Did not start; DSQ – Disqualified;
Discard is crossed out and does not count for the overall result.

- 1988 Progress

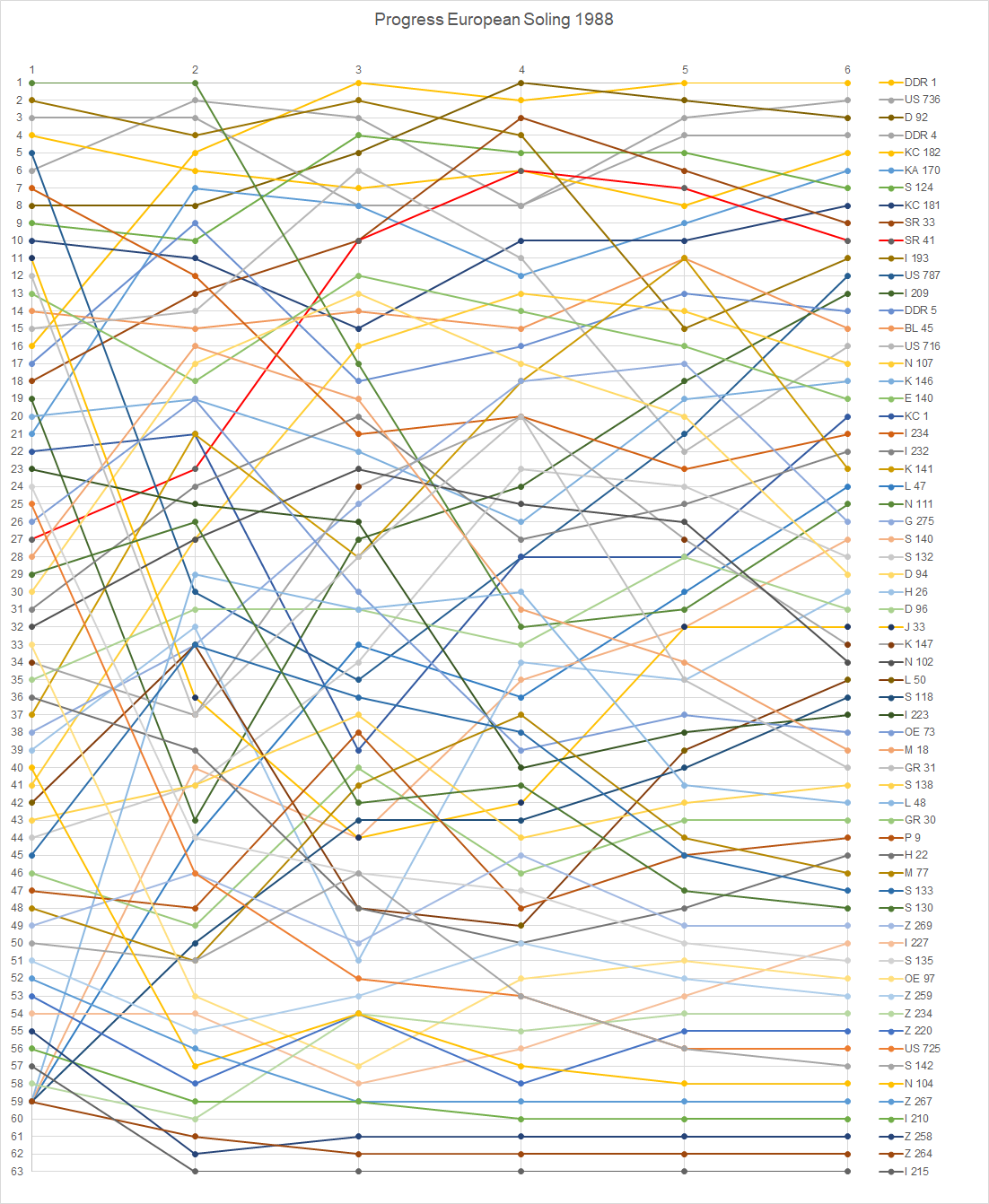

== 1989 Final results ==
1989
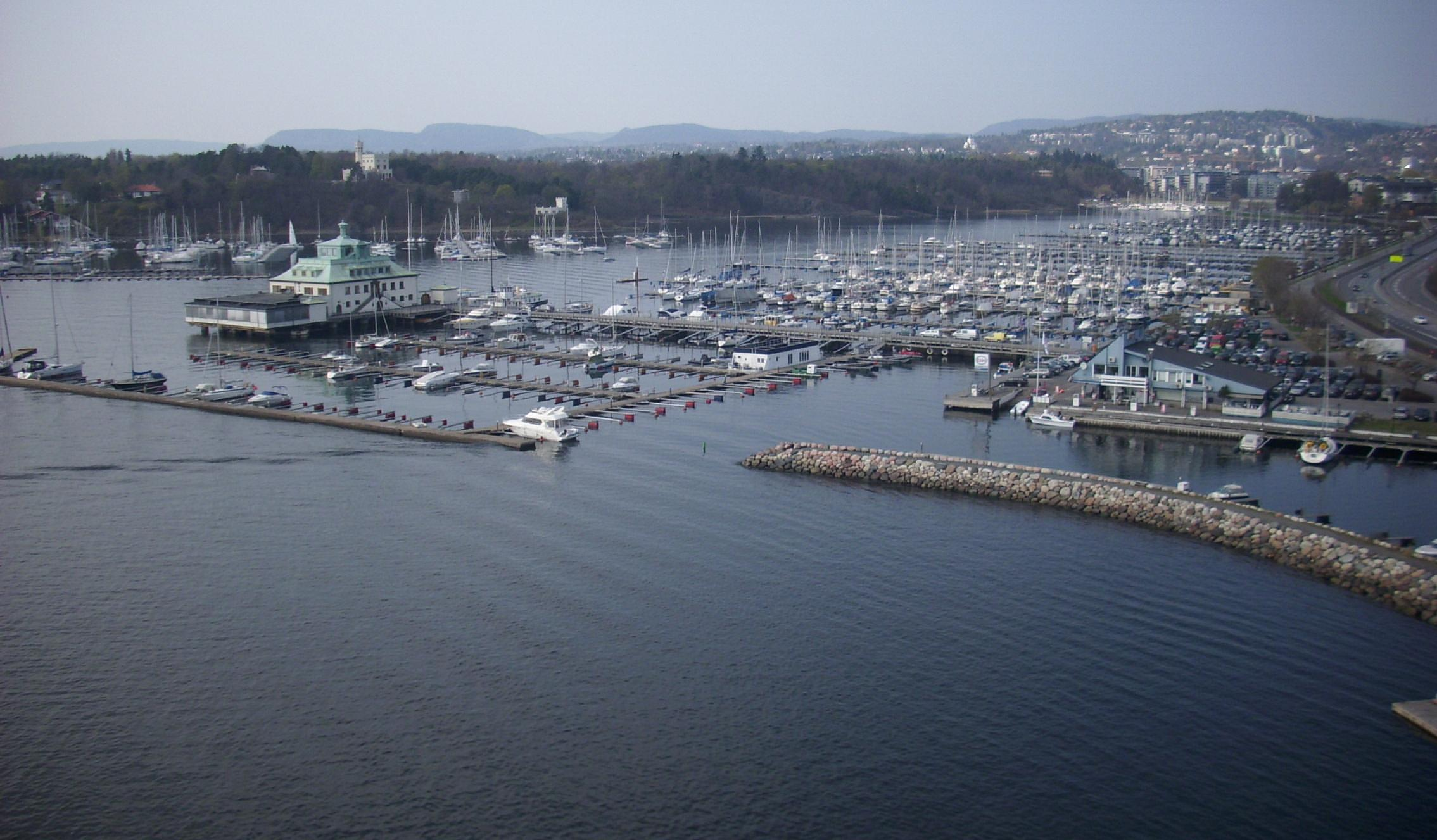

Event title
- Edition: 22
- Host: Kongelig Norsk Seilforening, KNS

Event details
- Venue: Oslo, Norway
- Dates: 1–9 September
- Yachts: 48
- Key people: Olav V of Norway (prizegiving)
- Opening ceremony: 4 September

Competitors
- Competitors: 144
- Competing nations: 18

Results
- (gold) Gold: Denmark; Jesper Bank; Jesper Seier; Steen Secher
- (silver) Silver: Soviet Union; Serhiy Pichuhin; Gennadi Strakh; Andrei Nikandrov
- (bronze) Bronze: East Germany; Jochen Schümann; Thomas Flach; Bernd Jäkel

Rank	Country	Helmsman	Crew	Sail No.	Race 1		Race 2		Race 3		Race 4		Race 5		Race 6		Race 7		Total	Total – discard
Rank	Country	Helmsman	Crew	Sail No.	Pos.	Pts.	Pos.	Pts.	Pos.	Pts.	Pos.	Pts.	Pos.	Pts.	Pos.	Pts.	Pos.	Pts.	Total	Total – discard
1st place, gold medalist(s)	DEN	Jesper Bank	Jesper Seier; Steen Secher	D 92	9	15.0	4	8.0	1	0.0	10	16.0	2	3.0	~~19~~	~~25.0~~	5	10.0	77.0	52.0
2nd place, silver medalist(s)	URS	Serhiy Pichuhin	Gennadi Strakh; Andrei Nikandrov	SR 41	4	8.0	1	0.0	~~3~~	~~5.7~~	14	20.0	3	5.7	14	20.0	12	18.0	77.4	57.4
3rd place, bronze medalist(s)	GDR	Jochen Schümann	Thomas Flach; Bernd Jäkel	DDR 1	1	0.0	18	24.0	2	3.0	1	0.0	~~PMS~~	~~55.0~~	15	21.0	10	16.0	119.0	64.0
4	CAN	Bill Abbott Jr.	Nomen nescio	KC 1	8	14.0	6	11.7	5	10.0	4	8.0	~~12~~	~~18.0~~	11	17.0	6	11.7	90.4	72.4
5	DEN	Morten Henriksen	Nomen nescio	D 96	~~14~~	~~20.0~~	5	10.0	10	16.0	15	21.0	6	11.7	7	13.0	3	5.7	97.4	76.4
6	CAN	Hans Fogh	Nomen nescio	KC 181	2	3.0	3	5.7	17	23.0	5	10.0	~~PMS~~	~~55.0~~	6	11.7	23	29.0	137.4	82.4
7	GDR	Helmar Nauck	Norbert Hellriegel; Sven Diedering	DDR 4	17	23.0	19	25.0	6	11.7	6	11.7	4	8.0	~~27~~	~~33.0~~	2	3.0	115.4	82.4
8	URS	Tõnu Tõniste	Nomen nescio	SR 29	~~24~~	~~30.0~~	15	21.0	16	22.0	13	19.0	8	14.0	1	0.0	15	21.0	127.0	97.0
9	CAN	Paul Thomson	Philip Gow; Stuart Flinn	KC 182	5	10.0	7	13.0	4	8.0	7	13.0	~~PMS~~	~~55.0~~	DSQ	55.0	1	0.0	154.0	99.0
10	SWE	Martin Palsson	Nomen nescio	S 140	11	17.0	11	17.0	~~35~~	~~41.0~~	23	29.0	7	13.0	2	3.0	14	20.0	140.0	99.0
11	NED	Roy Heiner	Nomen nescio	H 26	~~PMS~~	~~55.0~~	16	22.0	25	31.0	9	15.0	9	15.0	8	14.0	16	22.0	174.0	119.0
12	SWE	Magnus Holmberg	Johan Barne; Björn Alm	S 135	13	19.0	10	16.0	9	15.0	24	30.0	~~PMS~~	~~55.0~~	5	10.0	24	30.0	175.0	120.0
13	FRG	Wolfgang Gerz	Nomen nescio	G 277	10	16.0	23	29.0	19	25.0	11	17.0	12	18.0	~~21~~	~~27.0~~	13	19.0	151.0	122.0
14	FRA	Thierry Peponnet	Nomen nescio	F 188	19	25.0	13	19.0	22	28.0	~~25~~	~~31.0~~	14	20.0	12	18.0	9	15.0	156.0	125.0
15	AUT	Michael Luschan	Nomen nescio	OE 73	20	26.0	9	15.0	23	29.0	17	23.0	11	17.0	10	16.0	~~34~~	~~40.0~~	166.0	126.0
16	CAN	Eric Koppernaes	Nomen nescio	KC 158	~~DNF~~	~~55.0~~	8	14.0	36	42.0	26	32.0	1	0.0	13	19.0	21	27.0	189.0	134.0
17	GBR	Rory Bowman	Nomen nescio	K 147	7	13.0	~~32~~	~~38.0~~	14	20.0	28	34.0	10	16.0	23	29.0	18	24.0	174.0	136.0
18	SWE	Peter Carlsson	Nomen nescio	S 131	6	11.7	24	30.0	21	27.0	8	14.0	20	26.0	~~24~~	~~30.0~~	22	28.0	166.7	136.7
19	AUS	William Hodder	Tim Dorning; Michael Mottl	KA 172	3	5.7	2	3.0	~~DNF~~	~~55.0~~	22	28.0	PMS	55.0	34	40.0	4	8.0	194.7	139.7
20	NOR	Dag Usterud	Nomen nescio	N 111	22	28.0	39	45.0	15	21.0	3	5.7	~~PMS~~	~~55.0~~	3	5.7	29	35.0	195.4	140.4
21	NOR	Rune Jacobsen	Nomen nescio	N 104	26	32.0	14	20.0	20	26.0	~~29~~	~~35.0~~	5	10.0	25	31.0	17	23.0	177.0	142.0
22	USA	Kevin Mahaney	Nomen nescio	US 787	~~PMS~~	~~55.0~~	22	28.0	18	24.0	2	3.0	PMS	55.0	17	23.0	11	17.0	205.0	150.0
23	NOR	Terje Wang	Nomen nescio	N 107	18	24.0	20	26.0	7	13.0	12	18.0	~~PMS~~	~~55.0~~	16	22.0	43	49.0	207.0	152.0
24	HUN	Antal Székely	Nomen nescio	M 18	~~DSQ~~	~~55.0~~	12	18.0	24	30.0	20	26.0	21	27.0	35	41.0	7	13.0	210.0	155.0
25	SWE	Anders Nordstrom	Nomen nescio	S 139	~~DNF~~	~~55.0~~	21	27.0	11	17.0	19	25.0	16	22.0	9	15.0	DNC	55.0	216.0	161.0
26	FRA	Michel Kermarek	Nomen nescio	F 162	~~PMS~~	~~55.0~~	DSQ	55.0	13	19.0	16	22.0	27	33.0	4	8.0	19	30.0	222.0	167.0
27	ITA	Flavio Favini	Nomen nescio	I 234	31	37.0	17	23.0	26	32.0	21	27.0	19	25.0	18	24.0	~~32~~	~~38.0~~	224.0	168.0
28	FRG	Thomas Jungblut	Nomen nescio	G 269	15	21.0	26	32.0	12	18.0	30	36.0	23	29.0	~~36~~	~~42.0~~	27	33.0	211.0	169.0
29	ITA	Federico Stopani	Nomen nescio	I 223	12	18.0	25	31.0	8	14.0	18	24.0	34	40.0	~~42~~	~~48.0~~	38	44.0	219.0	171.0
30	CAN	Jim Beatty	Nomen nescio	KC 185	25	31.0	30	36.0	34	40.0	27	33.0	15	21.0	~~PMS~~	~~55.0~~	20	26.0	242.0	187.0
31	FIN	Heikki Hohtari	Nomen nescio	L 50	34	40.0	27	33.0	~~37~~	~~43.0~~	34	40.0	28	34.0	28	34.0	8	14.0	238.0	195.0
32	ITA	Giova Arrivabene	Nomen nescio	I 232	32	38.0	31	37.0	27	33.0	32	38.0	18	24.0	~~DNF~~	~~55.0~~	39	45.0	270.0	215.0
33	NED	Rudy den Outer	Bas Nederveen, Jr. Robert Molsbergen	H 22	23	29.0	29	35.0	31	37.0	~~DSQ~~	~~55.0~~	30	36.0	38	44.0	33	39.0	275.0	220.0
34	SWE	Göran Sandberg	Nomen nescio	S 126	28	34.0	34	40.0	30	36.0	~~43~~	~~49.0~~	29	35.0	31	37.0	37	43.0	274.0	225.0
35	GBR	George Barker	Nomen nescio	K 141	~~DSQ~~	~~55.0~~	44	50.0	33	39.0	37	43.0	17	23.0	26	32.0	30	36.0	278.0	223.0
36	POR	Antonio Tanger	Nomen nescio	P 9	27	33.0	~~35~~	~~41.0~~	29	35.0	31	37.0	32	38.0	33	39.0	35	41.0	264.0	223.0
37	FIN	Peter Koskull	Nomen nescio	L 48	16	22.0	38	44.0	28	34.0	~~PMS~~	~~55.0~~	31	37.0	PMS	55.0	26	32.0	279.0	224.0
38	GRE	Matthias Meier	Nomen nescio	GR 32	36	42.0	36	42.0	~~DNF~~	~~55.0~~	DNF	55.0	22	28.0	20	26.0	31	37.0	285.0	230.0
39	GBR	Tony Dixon	Nomen nescio	K 143	21	27.0	43	49.0	~~DSQ~~	~~55.0~~	33	39.0	24	30.0	37	43.0	44	50.0	293.0	238.0
40	GBR	David Tabb	Nomen nescio	K 148	~~DNS~~	~~55.0~~	33	39.0	40	46.0	DNF	55.0	36	42.0	22	28.0	25	31.0	296.0	241.0
41	FRG	Axel Mertens	Nomen nescio	G 276	~~DNF~~	~~55.0~~	37	43.0	32	38.0	40	46.0	25	31.0	30	36.0	45	51.0	300.0	245.0
42	NOR	Elling Rishoff	Nomen nescio	N 87	~~PMS~~	~~55.0~~	28	34.0	38	44.0	39	45.0	26	32.0	40	46.0	40	46.0	302.0	247.0
43	NOR	Kristian Nergaard	Nomen nescio	N 91	30	36.0	45	51.0	~~DNF~~	~~55.0~~	41	47.0	33	39.0	29	35.0	41	47.0	310.0	255.0
44	GBR	Alan Holmes	Nomen nescio	K 149	38	44.0	~~46~~	~~52.0~~	41	47.0	42	48.0	37	43.0	32	38.0	36	42.0	314.0	262.0
45	ITA	Leonard Angelini	Nomen nescio	I 201	33	39.0	40	46.0	42	48.0	36	42.0	~~DNF~~	~~55.0~~	DNS	55.0	28	34.0	319.0	264.0
46	FRG	Thomas Friese	Nomen nescio	G 280	35	41.0	42	48.0	39	45.0	35	41.0	~~DSQ~~	~~55.0~~	39	45.0	42	48.0	323.0	268.0
47	NOR	Sverre Samdahl	Nomen nescio	N 108	37	43.0	41	47.0	43	49.0	38	44.0	35	41.0	41	47.0	~~DNC~~	~~55.0~~	326.0	271.0
48	NED	Ton Koot	Nomen nescio	H 25	29	35.0	~~DNF~~	~~55.0~~	DNC	55.0	DNC	55.0	DNC	55.0	DNC	55.0	DNC	55.0	365.0	310.0

Legend: DNF – Did not finish; DNS – Did not start; DSQ – Disqualified;
Discard is crossed out and does not count for the overall result.

- 1989 Progress

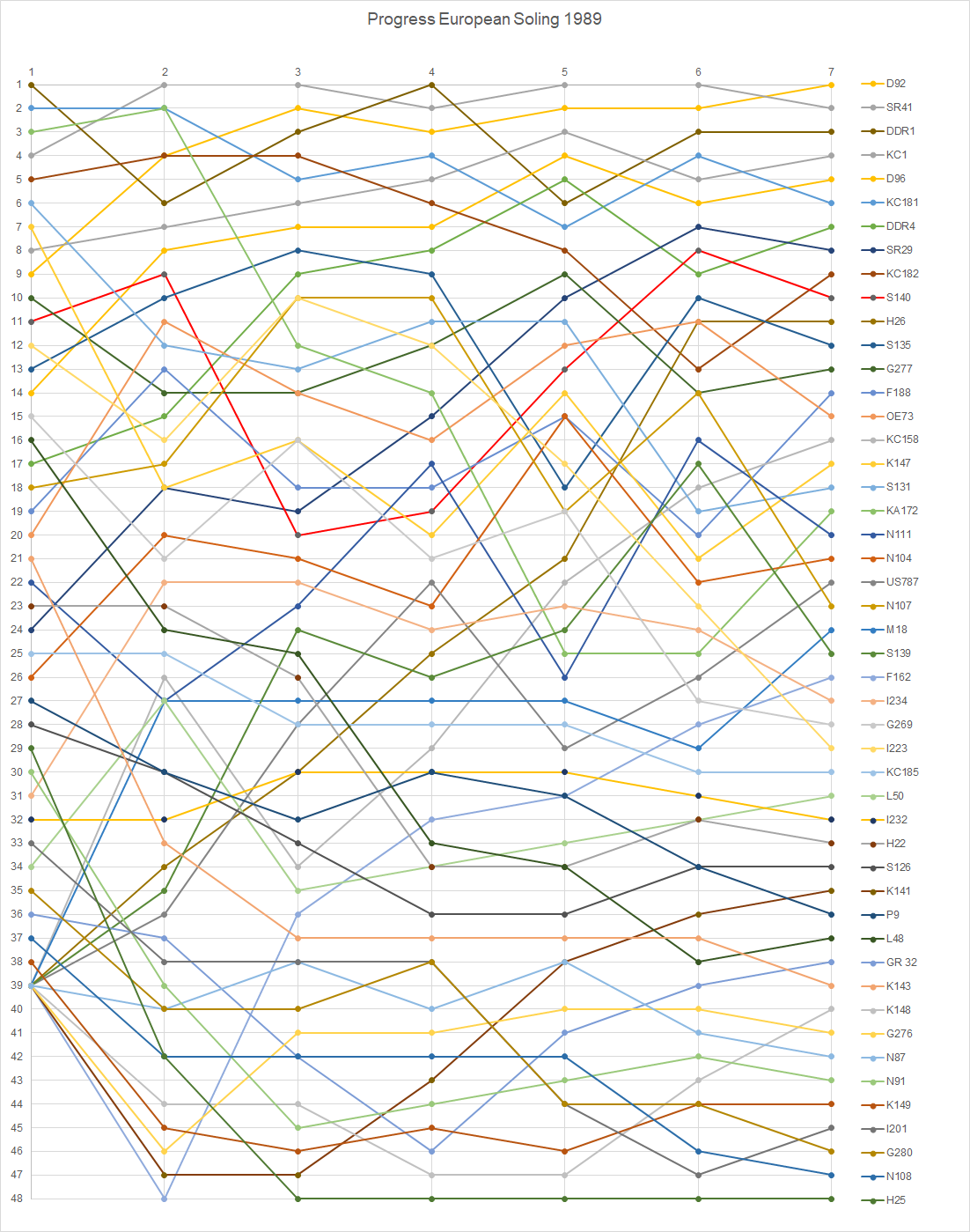

== Further results ==
- Soling European Championship results (1968–1979)
- Soling European Championship results (1980–1984)
- Soling European Championship results (1985–1989)
- Soling European Championship results (1990–1994)
- Soling European Championship results (1995–1999)
- Soling European Championship results (2000–2004)
- Soling European Championship results (2005–2009)
- Soling European Championship results (2010–2014)
- Soling European Championship results (2015–2019)
- Soling European Championship results (2020–2024)
