= Sailing at the 1984 Summer Olympics – Tornado =

Sailing at the Olympics

Tornado at the Games of the XXIII Olympiad
- Tornado
- Venue: Long Beach
- Dates: 31 July to 8 August
- Competitors: 40 from 20 nations
- Teams: 20

Medalists
1st place, gold medalist(s)		Rex Sellers; Chris Timms	New Zealand
2nd place, silver medalist(s)		Randy Smyth; Jay Glaser	United States
3rd place, bronze medalist(s)		Chris Cairns; John Anderson	Australia

The Tornado was a sailing event on the Sailing at the 1984 Summer Olympics program in Long Beach, Los Angeles County, California. Seven races were scheduled. 40 sailors, on 20 boats, from 20 nations competed.

== Results ==
Rank	Helmsman (Country)	Crew	Race I		Race II		Race III		Race IV		Race V		Race VI		Race VII		Total Points	Total -1
Rank	Helmsman (Country)	Crew	Rank	Points	Rank	Points	Rank	Points	Rank	Points	Rank	Points	Rank	Points	Rank	Points	Total Points	Total -1
1st place, gold medalist(s)	Rex Sellers (NZL)	Chris Timms	3	5.7	2	3.0	1	0.0	2	3.0	1	0.0	2	3.0	~~DNS~~	~~27.0~~	41.7	14.7
2nd place, silver medalist(s)	Randy Smyth (USA)	Jay Glaser	1	0.0	~~DNF~~	~~27.0~~	7	13.0	1	0.0	4	8.0	1	0.0	10	16.0	64.0	37.0
3rd place, bronze medalist(s)	Chris Cairns (AUS)	John Anderson	4	8.0	16	22.0	3	5.7	~~RET~~	~~27.0~~	2	3.0	6	11.7	1	0.0	77.4	50.4
4	Paul Elvstrøm (DEN)	Trine Elvstrøm-Myralf	6	11.7	3	5.7	5	10.0	3	5.7	~~14~~	~~20.0~~	4	8.0	5	10.0	71.1	51.1
5	Alan Burland (BER)	Christopher Nash	~~8~~	~~14.0~~	6	11.7	4	8.0	6	11.7	7	13.0	YMP	3.4	3	5.7	67.5	53.5
6	Robert White (GBR)	David Campbell-James	2	3.0	5	10.0	2	3.0	~~8~~	~~14.0~~	6	11.7	7	13.0	7	13.0	67.7	53.7
7	Lars Grael (BRA)	Glein Haynes	5	10.0	8	14.0	~~14~~	~~20.0~~	11	17.0	3	5.7	5	10.0	12	18.0	94.7	74.7
8	Yves Loday (FRA)	Bernard Pichery	~~DSQ~~	~~27.0~~	1	0.0	9	15.0	10	16.0	9	15.0	10	16.0	13	19.0	108.0	81.0
9	David Sweeney (CAN)	Brian Sweeney	7	13.0	12	18.0	8	14.0	7	13.0	8	14.0	~~DNF~~	~~27.0~~	6	11.7	110.7	83.7
10	Göran Marström (SWE)	Krister Söderqvist	11	17.0	4	8.0	~~13~~	~~19.0~~	4	8.0	12	18.0	13	19.0	8	14.0	103.0	84.0
11	Willy van Bladel (NED)	Huub Lambriex	~~DSQ~~	~~27.0~~	7	13.0	11	17.0	5	10.0	10	16.0	DSQ	27.0	2	3.0	113.0	86.0
12	Norbert Petschel (AUT)	Walter Schlagbauer	9	15.0	9	15.0	10	16.0	~~16~~	~~22.0~~	11	17.0	11	17.0	4	8.0	110.0	88.0
13	Eckart Kaphengst (FRG)	Hans-Friedrich Böse	10	16.0	15	21.0	15	21.0	9	15.0	~~16~~	~~22.0~~	9	15.0	11	17.0	127.0	105.0
14	Rolf Zwicky (SUI)	Christoph Brüllmann	13	19.0	10	16.0	6	11.7	14	20.0	~~DSQ~~	~~27.0~~	12	18.0	15	21.0	132.7	105.7
15	Sergio Sinistri (ARG)	Martín Ferrari	15	21.0	14	20.0	12	18.0	13	19.0	5	10.0	14	20.0	~~17~~	~~23.0~~	131.0	108.0
16	Pekka Narko (FIN)	Juha Valtanen	12	18.0	11	17.0	16	22.0	12	18.0	~~17~~	~~23.0~~	8	14.0	14	20.0	132.0	109.0
17	Per Ferskaug (NOR)	Halvor Ramel Smith	14	20.0	13	19.0	~~17~~	~~23.0~~	15	21.0	15	21.0	15	21.0	9	15.0	140.0	117.0
18	Juan Torruella Jr. (PUR)	Enrique Díaz	16	22.0	~~17~~	~~23.0~~	18	24.0	17	23.0	13	19.0	16	22.0	16	22.0	155.0	131.0
19	Colin Philp Sr. (FIJ)	Bruce Hewett	17	23.0	18	24.0	~~DNF~~	~~27.0~~	18	24.0	19	25.0	17	23.0	18	24.0	170.0	143.0
20	Ertuğrul Özkan (TUR)	Aleksandr Çaykovski	18	24.0	19	25.0	19	25.0	19	25.0	18	24.0	18	24.0	~~DNF~~	~~27.0~~	174.0	147.0

DNF = Did Not Finish, DNS= Did Not Start, DSQ = Disqualified, PMS = Premature Start, YMP = Yacht Materially Prejudiced
= Male, = Female

=== Daily standings ===
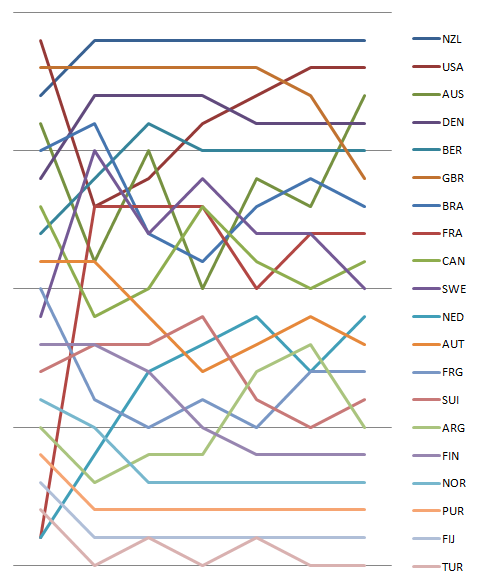
Graph showing the daily standings in the Tornado during the 1984 Summer Olympics

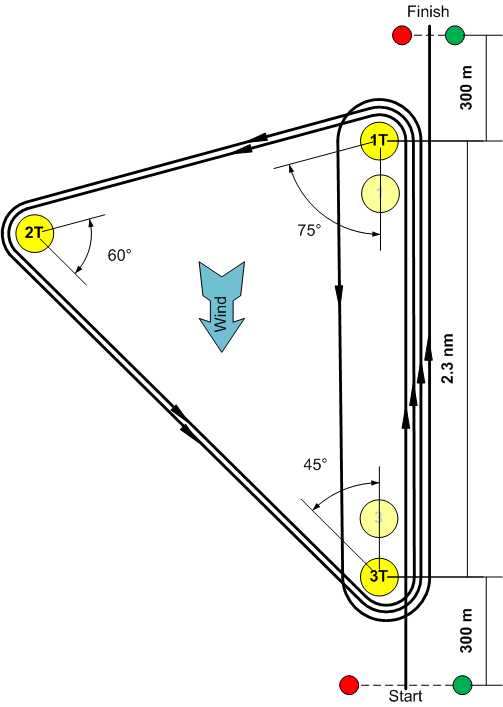
Tornado Course Map
