= Schlagbauer =

Schlagbauer is a German language habitational surname for a peasant (German: Bauer) living in an area near a forest that was made arable by cutting wood (German: Holzschlagen "chopping wood"). Notable people with the name include:

- Albert Schlagbauer (1913–2001), German educationist
- Christoph Schlagbauer (born 1989), Austrian triathlete
- Rainer Schlagbauer (1949–2022), Austrian footballer
- Walter Schlagbauer (born 1960), Austrian sailor
