= Enrique Díaz =

Enrique Díaz may refer to:

- Enrique Díaz (musician) (born 1945), Colombian musician
- Enrique Díaz (sailor) (born 1957), Puerto Rican sailor
- Enrique Díaz (footballer, born 1959), Costa Rican football winger
- Enrique Díaz (footballer, born 1982), Uruguayan football centre-back
