= Brian Sweeney (disambiguation) =

Brian Sweeney may refer to:

- Brian Sweeney (born 1974), American former baseball pitcher and coach
- Brian Sweeney Fitzgerald, main character of the movie Fitzcarraldo
- Brian Sweeney (sailor) (born 1961), Canadian sailor
