= Juan Torruella Jr. =

Puerto Rican sailor

Personal information
- Nationality: Puerto Rican
- Born: 11 June 1957 (age 67)
- Parents: Juan R. Torruella (father); Judith Wirt (mother)

Sport
- Sport: Sailing

Juan Rafael Torruella del Valle Jr. (born 11 June 1957) is a Puerto Rican sailor. He competed in the Tornado event at the 1984 Summer Olympics, finishing in 18th place with his partner, Enrique Díaz. He is the son of judge and fellow Puerto Rican Olympic sailor Juan R. Torruella.
