= Sergio Sinistri =

Argentine sailor

Personal information
- Nationality: Argentine
- Born: 11 April 1952 (age 72)

Sport
- Sport: Sailing

Sergio Sinistri (born 11 April 1952) is an Argentine sailor. He competed in the Tornado event at the 1984 Summer Olympics, finishing in 15th place.
