= Bernard Pichery =

French sailor

Personal information
- Nationality: French
- Born: 24 March 1953 (age 71)

Sport
- Sport: Sailing

Bernard Pichery (born 24 March 1953) is a French sailor. He competed in the Tornado event at the 1984 Summer Olympics.
