= Bruce Hewett =

Fijian sailor

Personal information
- Nationality: Fijian
- Born: 4 February 1954 (age 72)

Sport
- Sport: Sailing

Bruce Hewett (born 4 February 1954) is a Fijian sailor. He competed in the Tornado event at the 1984 Summer Olympics.
