= Christoph Brüllmann =

Swiss sailor

Personal information
- Nationality: Swiss
- Born: 14 January 1958 (age 67)

Sport
- Sport: Sailing

Christoph Brüllmann (born 14 January 1958) is a Swiss sailor. He competed in the Tornado event at the 1984 Summer Olympics.
