= David Campbell-James =

British sailor

Personal information
- Nationality: British
- Born: 29 December 1949 (age 75); Chester, England

Sport
- Sport: Sailing

David Campbell-James (born 29 December 1949) is a British sailor. He competed in the Tornado event at the 1984 Summer Olympics.
