= Hans-Friedrich Böse =

German sailor

Personal information
- Nationality: German
- Born: 30 March 1950 (age 74); Bremen, Germany

Sport
- Sport: Sailing

Hans-Friedrich Böse (born 30 March 1950) is a German sailor. He competed in the Tornado event at the 1984 Summer Olympics.
