= Eckart Kaphengst =

German sailor

Personal information
- Nationality: German
- Born: 12 September 1958 (age 66); Hamburg, Germany

Sport
- Sport: Sailing

Eckart Kaphengst (born 12 September 1958) is a German sailor. He competed in the Tornado event at the 1984 Summer Olympics.
