= Ertuğrul Özkan =

Turkish sailor

Personal information
- Nationality: Turkish
- Born: 23 October 1942 (age 82)

Sport
- Sport: Sailing

Ertuğrul Özkan (born 23 October 1942) is a Turkish sailor. He competed in the Tornado event at the 1984 Summer Olympics, finishing last of 20 competitors.
