= Rolf Zwicky =

Swiss sailor

Personal information
- Nationality: Swiss
- Born: 3 August 1957 (age 67)

Sport
- Sport: Sailing

Rolf Zwicky (born 3 August 1957) is a Swiss sailor. He competed in the Tornado event at the 1984 Summer Olympics.
