= Krister Söderqvist =

Swedish sailor

Personal information
- Nationality: Swedish
- Born: 25 February 1959 (age 66); Åtvidaberg, Sweden

Sport
- Sport: Sailing

Krister Söderqvist (born 25 February 1959) is a Swedish sailor. He competed in the Tornado event at the 1984 Summer Olympics.
