= Martín Ferrari =

Argentine sailor

Personal information
- Nationality: Argentine
- Born: 2 July 1958 (age 66)

Sport
- Sport: Sailing

Martín Ferrari (born 2 July 1958) is an Argentine sailor. He competed in the Tornado event at the 1984 Summer Olympics.
