= Glyn Charles =

British sailor (1965–1998)

Personal information
- Full name: Glyn Roderick Charles
- Nationality: British
- Born: 4 September 1965 Winchester, England
- Died: 27 December 1998 (aged 33) Bass Strait, Australia

Sport
- Sport: Sailing

Glyn Charles (4 September 1965 – 27 December 1998) was a British sailor. He competed in the Star event at the 1996 Summer Olympics. He was one of six sailors to die during a storm in the 1998 Sydney to Hobart Yacht Race.

== Early life and education ==
Charles was educated at Pangbourne College, where he took up sailing, and at Portsmouth Polytechnic. After five years' experience, he became a member of the British Youth Sailing squad, and at the age of 22 was national champion in the Laser dinghy class.

== Sailing career ==
Charles subsequently began yacht sailing. In 1988 and 1992, he competed for a place in the three-man Soling event, but lost to Lawrie Smith; in 1996, he beat Smith for selection in the two-man Star class, participating in the Atlanta Games, where he came 11th. At the time of his death he was preparing a campaign to race a Star in the Sydney 2000 Summer Olympics. After missing selection for the 1992 Olympics, Charles undertook offshore racing, first representing Great Britain in the 1993 Admiral's Cup; he would participate in the event four times. He funded his endeavours by racing various types of boat on behalf of others, and received support from prominent sailing philanthropists.

== Death ==
Charles drowned whilst participating in the 630-mile Sydney to Hobart race, sailing the Sword of Orion; intense conditions battered the 115-boat fleet, sinking five, and causing 66 to retire, with 55 crewmen requiring recovery in Australia's biggest maritime rescue. As the yacht rolled 360 degrees, Charles was washed overboard into 40-foot waves and 80-knot headwinds. Last seen on the surface of the water at 5:10 P.M. on 27 December, thought to have sustained injuries when the boat rolled, his body was not recovered. The inquest found, after tests conducted on the lanyard Charles was wearing, that it did not meet the required Australian standard, and had failed at the stitching.

== Personal life ==
Charles lived in Emsworth, Hampshire, with his girlfriend, Annie Goodman, also a sailing enthusiast. He was survived by his mother and sister.
