= Walter Schlagbauer =

Austrian sailor

Personal information
- Nationality: Austrian
- Born: 21 June 1960 (age 64); Himmelberg, Austria

Sport
- Sport: Sailing

Walter Schlagbauer (born 21 June 1960) is an Austrian former sailor. He competed in the Tornado event at the 1984 Summer Olympics.
