= Per Ferskaug =

Norwegian sailor (born 1958)

Personal information
- Nationality: Norwegian
- Born: 23 September 1958 (age 67) Oslo, Norway

Sport
- Sport: Sailing
- Club: Royal Norwegian Yacht Club

Per Ferskaug (born 23 September 1958) is a Norwegian sailor. He was born in Oslo and represented the Royal Norwegian Yacht Club. He participated at the 1984 Summer Olympics in Los Angeles, where he placed 17th in the multihull class, together with Halvor Smith.
