= Juha Valtanen =

Finnish sailor

Personal information
- Nationality: Finnish
- Born: 6 December 1952 (age 72); Helsinki, Finland

Sport
- Sport: Sailing

Juha Valtanen (born 6 December 1952) is a Finnish sailor. He competed in the Tornado event at the 1984 Summer Olympics.
