= Lennart Persson =

Olympic sailor from Sweden

Michel Lennart Persson
Personal information
- Nationality: Sweden
- Born: 25 October 1958 (age 67) Stockholm

Sport

Sailing career
- Class: Soling
- Club: Royal Swedish Yacht Club
- Updated on 28 February 2020

Lennart Persson (born 20 June 1958) is a sailor from Stockholm, Sweden, who represented his country at the 1988 Summer Olympics in Busan, South Korea as helmsman in the Soling. With crew members Eje Öberg and Tony Wallin they took the 8th place.
