= Christoph Schlagbauer =

Austrian triathlete

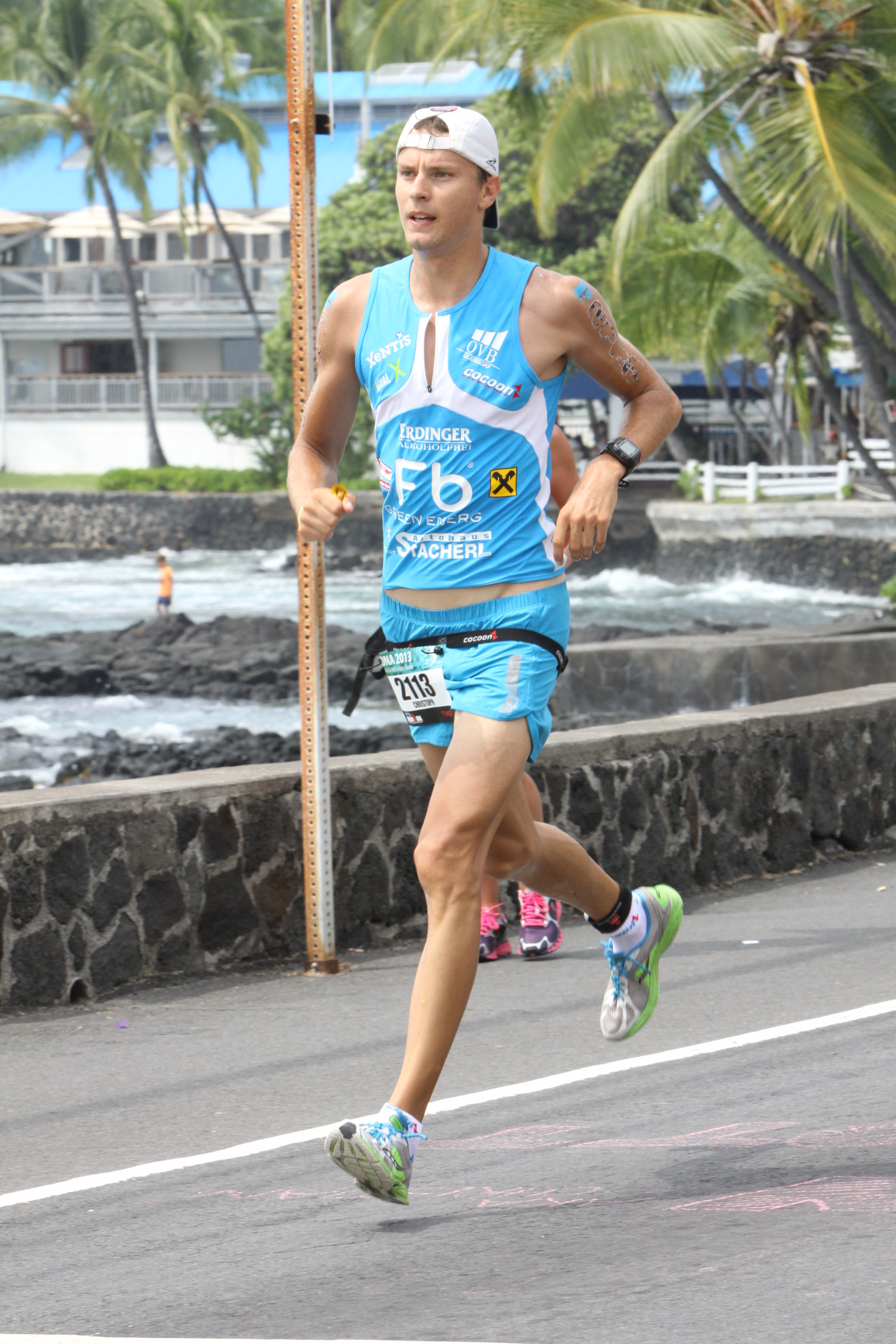
- Christoph Schlagbauer at the 2013 Ironman World Championship

Personal information
- Nickname: Schlagi
- Born: 11 September 1989 (age 36) Graz, Austria
- Height: 190 cm (6 ft 3 in)
- Weight: 72 kg (159 lb)

Sport
- Country: Austria
- Club: RTT Passail
- Team: Team Erdinger Alkoholfrei
- Turned pro: 2014
- Retired: active
Medal record
Men's triathlon
Representing Austria
Ironman World Championship
Silver medal – second place	2013	AgeGroup M18
Silver medal – second place	2012	AgeGroup M18

Christoph Schlagbauer (born 11 September 1989) is an Austrian professional triathlete. His biggest achievement is from the period as an AgeGrouper, when he won the Silver Medal at the 2013 Ironman World Championship AgeGroup M18.

== Triathlon career ==
Schlagbauer started to join in local running competitions while in school and won a number in the youth category and several overall. He got into endurance sports and started Triathlon racing in 2011.

After a few sprint- and short distance races, Schlagbauer finished an Ironman 70.3 in 4h16min (Pays d’Aix, France, 2011) in the end of his first year in training. He won the Silver Medal in the 2012 Ironman 70.3 European Championship on the same distance in his age group (M18-24) and qualified for the Ironman 70.3 World Championship in Las Vegas, before he managed the same for the Ironman World Championship Hawaii in 2013 with his victory in the AgeGroup M18 in his first Ironman, the Ironman Austria. He won the Silver Medal in the M18 in 9h3min. In 2014 he turned professional. His best result in an Ironman brand race since then is the 8th place in the 2015 Ironman 70.3 Subic Bay.

== Personal life ==
Schlagbauer studied Sport Science at the University of Graz and established an enterprise in 2016. With the GET Endurance GesbR he's working in the workplace health promotion sector.
