= Halvor Smith =

Norwegian sailor (born 1960)

Personal information
- Nationality: Norwegian
- Born: 4 February 1960 (age 66) Oslo, Norway

Sport
- Sport: Sailing
- Club: Royal Norwegian Yacht Club

Halvor Ramel Smith (born 4 February 1960) is a Norwegian sailor. He was born in Oslo and represented the Royal Norwegian Yacht Club. He participated at the 1984 Summer Olympics in Los Angeles, where he placed 17th in the multihull class, together with Per Ferskaug.
