= Tony Wallin =

Olympic sailor from Sweden

Personal information
- Full name: Jan Tony Wallin
- Nationality: Sweden
- Born: 8 May 1957 Spånga
- Died: 3 April 2004 (aged 46) Farsta

Sailing career
- Sport: Sailing
- Club: Royal Swedish Yacht Club
- Class: Soling
- Updated on 28 February 2020

Tony Wallin (born 8 March 1957 Spånga, death: 3 April 2004 Farsta) is a sailor from Sweden. who represented his country at the 1988 Summer Olympics in Busan, South Korea as crew member in the Soling. With helmsman Lennart Persson and fellow crew members Eje Öberg they took the 8th place.
