= Eje Öberg =

Olympic sailor from Sweden

Personal information
- Full name: Rolf Eje Öberg
- Nationality: Sweden
- Born: 8 November 1958 (age 67) Haninge Municipality

Sailing career
- Sport: Sailing
- Club: Royal Swedish Yacht Club
- Class: Soling
- Updated on 28 February 2020

Eje Öberg (born 8 November 1958) is a sailor from Haninge Municipality, Sweden. who represented his country at the 1988 Summer Olympics in Busan, South Korea as crew member in the Soling. With helmsman Lennart Persson and fellow crew members Tony Wallin they took the 8th place.
