= Brian Sweeney (sailor) =

Canadian sailor

Personal information
- Nationality: Canadian
- Born: 27 March 1961 (age 65) Boston, Massachusetts, United States

Sport
- Sport: Sailing

Brian Sweeney (born 27 March 1961) is a Canadian sailor. He competed in the Tornado event at the 1984 Summer Olympics.
