= Enrique Díaz (sailor) =

Puerto Rican sailor

Personal information
- Nationality: Puerto Rican
- Born: 27 April 1957 (age 67)

Sport
- Sport: Sailing

Enrique Díaz (born 27 April 1957) is a Puerto Rican sailor. He competed in the Tornado event at the 1984 Summer Olympics.
