= Soling World Championship results (1985–1989) =

Soling
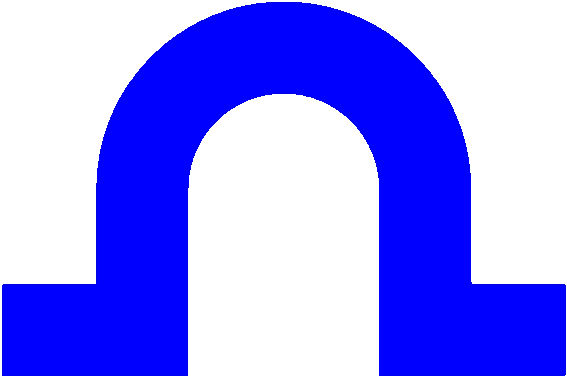

Development
- Name: Soling

This article stated the results of the World Soling Championships from 1985 till 1989. Unfortunately not all crew names are documented in the major sources: United States Soling Association (USSA) bulletin "Leading Edge" and International Soling Association (ISA) magazine "Soling Sailing".

== 1985 Final results ==
Only the top 20 boats are documented.

1985
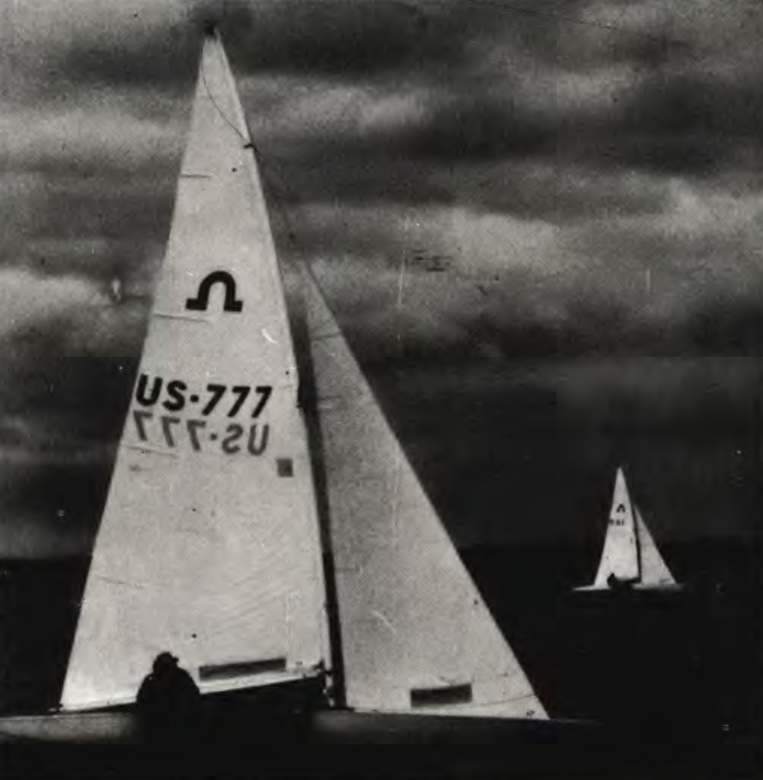

Event title
- Edition: 18
- Host: Sarnia Yacht Club

Event details
- Venue: Sarnia, Canada
- Dates: 5–17 September
- Yachts: 39
- Key people: Abbott Family
- Opening ceremony: 10 September

Competitors
- Competitors: 117
- Competing nations: 12

Results
- (gold) Gold: United States; Dave Curtis; John Engel; Wally Corwin
- (silver) Silver: Brazil; Torben Grael; Daniel Adler; Ronaldo Senfft
- (bronze) Bronze: United States; John Kostecki; William Baylis; Robert Billingham

Rank	Country	Helmsman	Crew	Sail No.	Race 1		Race 2		Race 3		Race 4		Race 5		Race 6		Race 7		Total	Total – discard
Rank	Country	Helmsman	Crew	Sail No.	Pos.	Pts.	Pos.	Pts.	Pos.	Pts.	Pos.	Pts.	Pos.	Pts.	Pos.	Pts.	Pos.	Pts.	Total	Total – discard
1st place, gold medalist(s)	USA	Dave Curtis	John Engel; Wally Corwin	US 777	~~16~~	~~22.0~~	4	8.0	2	3.0	1	0.0	8	14.0	6	11.7	4	8.0	66.7	44.7
2nd place, silver medalist(s)	BRA	Torben Grael	Daniel Adler; Ronaldo Senfft	BL 45	8	14.0	~~10~~	~~16.0~~	7	13.0	3	5.7	5	10.0	3	5.7	1	0.0	64.4	48.4
3rd place, bronze medalist(s)	USA	John Kostecki	William Baylis; Robert Billingham	US 736	10	16.0	3	5.7	5	10.0	2	3.0	7	13.0	~~12~~	~~18.0~~	2	3.0	68.7	50.7
4	USA	Kevin Mahaney	Not documented	US 772	2	3.0	12	18.0	10	16.0	16	22.0	1	0.0	1	0.0	~~34~~	~~40.0~~	99.0	59.0
5	CAN	Hans Fogh	Not documented	KC 176	6	11.7	1	0.0	6	11.7	~~14~~	~~20.0~~	2	3.0	9	15.0	14	20.0	81.4	61.4
6	SWE	Lennart Person	Not documented	S 124	1	0.0	9	15.0	1	0.0	8	14.0	14	20.0	~~23~~	~~29.0~~	12	18.0	96.0	67.0
7	CAN	Terry McLaughlin	Not documented	KC 178	~~RET~~	~~46.0~~	5	10.0	3	5.7	10	16.0	4	8.0	14	20.0	11	17.0	122.7	76.7
8	CAN	Bill Abbott Jr.	Don Beatty; Larry Abbott	KC 1	26	32.0	2	3.0	4	8.0	7	13.0	3	5.7	~~31~~	~~37.0~~	19	25.0	123.7	86.7
9	ITA	Flavio Favini	Not documented	I 154	9	15.0	8	14.0	8	14.0	6	11.7	10	16.0	11	17.0	~~16~~	~~22.0~~	109.7	87.7
10	AUS	Peter Gilmour	Not documented	KA 157	5	10.0	~~18~~	~~24.0~~	11	17.0	5	10.0	16	22.0	4	8.0	17	23.0	114.0	90.0
11	DEN	Valdemar Bandolowski	Not documented	D 84	11	17.0	11	17.0	9	15.0	~~18~~	~~24.0~~	6	11.7	16	22.0	8	14.0	120.7	96.7
12	CAN	Paul Thomson	Stuart Flinn; Philip Gow	KC 158	4	8.0	13	19.0	17	23.0	4	8.0	17	23.0	~~30~~	~~36.0~~	10	16.0	133.0	97.0
13	USA	Gerard Coleman	Peter Coleman; Paul Coleman	US 769	3	5.7	20	26.0	~~PMS~~	~~46.0~~	22	28.0	18	24.0	8	14.0	3	5.7	149.4	103.4
14	FIN	Tom Jungell	Not documented	L 47	13	19.0	17	23.0	~~18~~	~~24.0~~	13	19.0	15	21.0	2	3.0	15	21.0	130.0	106.0
15	FRG	Thomas Jungblut	Not documented	G 262	7	13.0	6	11.7	~~PMS~~	~~46.0~~	9	15.0	9	15.0	18	24.0	28	34.0	158.7	112.7
16	NOR	Terje Wang	Not documented	N 96	17	23.0	19	25.0	20	26.0	11	17.0	7	13.0	7	13.0	~~28~~	~~34.0~~	151.0	117.0
17	FRG	Erich Hirt Jr.	Not documented	G 219	22	28.0	14	20.0	12	18.0	12	18.0	21	27.0	10	16.0	~~23~~	~~29.0~~	156.0	127.0
18	CAN	Jim Beatty	Not documented	KC 169	12	18.0	7	13.0	21	27.0	19	25.0	13	19.0	~~DNF~~	~~46.0~~	32	38.0	186.0	140.0
19	USA	Stuart H. Walker	Not documented	US 725	25	31.0	24	30.0	~~PMS~~	~~46.0~~	27	33.0	12	18.0	23	29.0	5	10.0	197.0	151.0
20	ITA	Sergio Santoni	Not documented	I 220	21	27.0	15	21.0	19	25.0	11	17.0	19	25.0	22	28.0	~~31~~	~~37.0~~	180.0	143.0

Legend: DNF – Did not finish; DNS – Did not start; DSQ – Disqualified; RET – Retired;
Discard is crossed out and does not count for the overall result.

- 1985 Progress

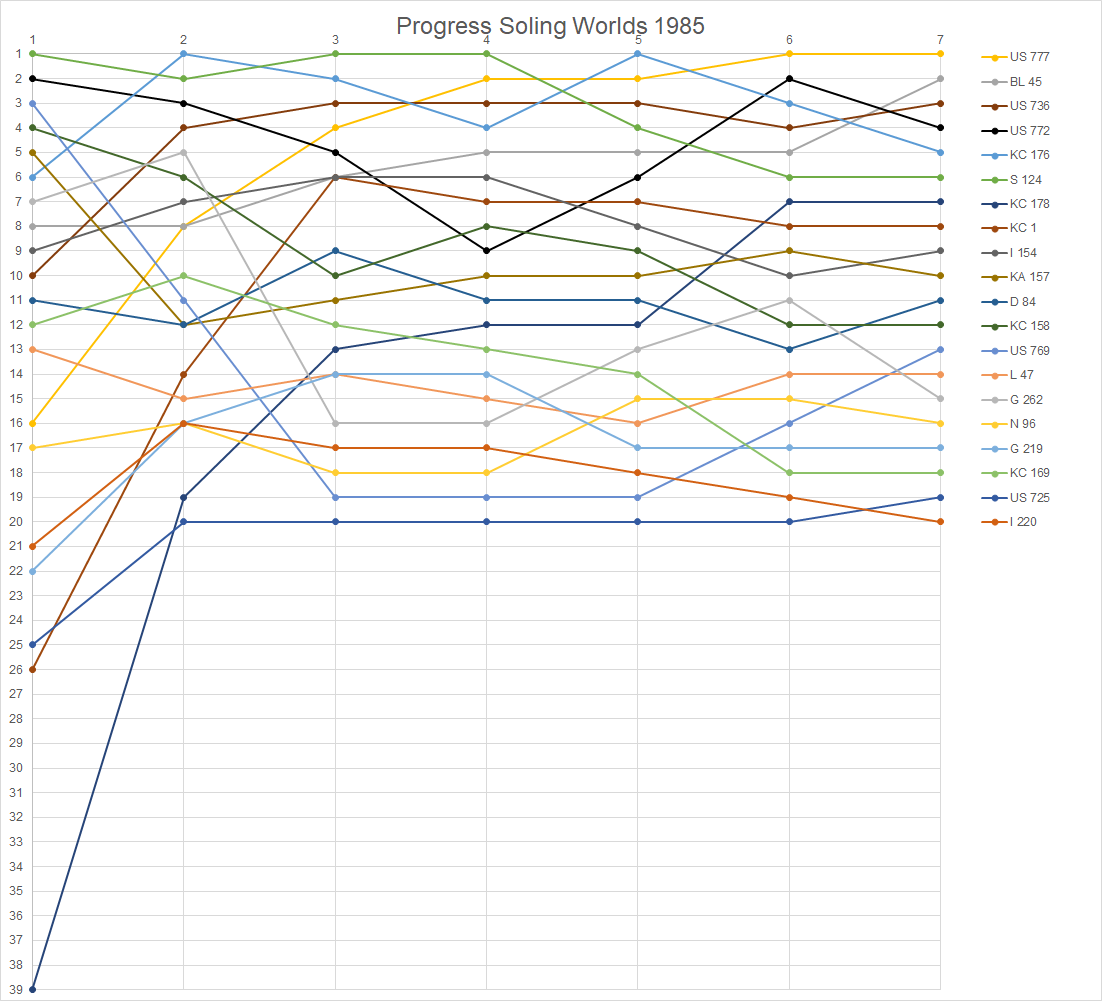

== 1986 Final results ==
1986
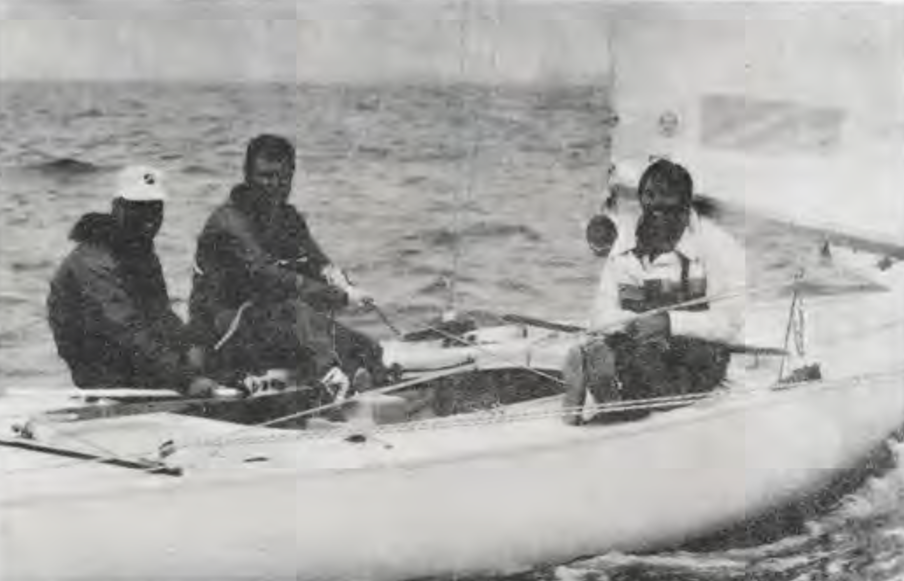

Event title
- Edition: 19
- Host: Société nautique de La Trinité-sur-Mer

Event details
- Venue: La Trinite-sur-Mer, France
- Dates: 4–14 September
- Yachts: 78
- Opening ceremony: 7 September

Competitors
- Competitors: 234
- Competing nations: 17

Results
- (gold) Gold: United States; John Kostecki; William Baylis; Bob Billingham
- (silver) Silver: United States; Dave Curtis; John Engel; Wally Corwin
- (bronze) Bronze: East Germany; Jochen Schümann; Thomas Flach; Bernd Jäkel

Rank	Country	Helmsman	Crew	Sail No.	Race 1		Race 2		Race 3		Race 4		Race 5		Race 6		Race 7		Total	Total – discard
Rank	Country	Helmsman	Crew	Sail No.	Pos.	Pts.	Pos.	Pts.	Pos.	Pts.	Pos.	Pts.	Pos.	Pts.	Pos.	Pts.	Pos.	Pts.	Total	Total – discard
1	USA	John Kostecki	Robert Billingham; William Baylis	US 736	16	22.0	8	14.0	2	3.0	1	0.0	8	14.0	~~24~~	~~30.0~~	1	0.0	83.0	53.0
2	USA	David Curtis	John Engel; Wally Corwin	US 777	6	11.7	12	18.0	18	24.0	~~25~~	~~31.0~~	3	5.7	3	5.7	3	5.7	101.8	70.8
3	GDR	Jochen Schumann	Thomas Flach; Bernd Jäkel	DDR 1	25	31.0	2	3.0	12	18.0	6	11.7	5	10.0	~~DSQ~~	~~85.0~~	2	3.0	161.7	76.7
4	CAN	Paul Thomson	Stuart Flinn; Philip Gow	KC 158	21	27.0	5	10.0	~~44~~	~~50.0~~	17	23.0	1	0.0	2	3.0	14	20.0	133.0	83.0
5	DEN	Poul Richard Høj Jensen	Not documented	D 90	12	18.0	7	13.0	4	8.0	12	18.0	~~16~~	~~22.0~~	12	18.0	4	8.0	105.0	83.0
6	CAN	Hans Fogh	Not documented	KC 176	9	15.0	9	15.0	20	26.0	2	3.0	9	15.0	~~22~~	~~28.0~~	11	17.0	119.0	91.0
7	GDR	Jorg Herrmann	Not documented	DDR 5	7	13.0	4	8.0	11	17.0	~~29~~	~~35.0~~	12	18.0	4	8.0	25	31.0	130.0	95.0
8	SWE	Lennart Persson	Not documented	S 124	10	16.0	3	5.7	~~30~~	~~36.0~~	10	16.0	2	3.0	27	33.0	16	22.0	131.7	95.7
9	SWE	Patrick Spangs	Not documented	S 131	8	14.0	~~59~~	~~65.0~~	3	5.7	3	5.7	29	35.0	14	20.0	29	35.0	180.4	115.4
10	URS	Georgy Shayduko	Not documented	SR 28	~~35~~	~~41.0~~	28	34.0	24	30.0	4	8.0	14	20.0	7	13.0	7	13.0	159.0	118.0
11	GDR	Helmar Nauck	Norbert Hellriegel; Sven Diedering	DDR 4	14	20.0	1	0.0	8	14.0	54	60.0	6	11.7	~~RET~~	~~85.0~~	8	14.0	204.7	119.7
12	FIN	Tom Jungell	Not documented	L 47	~~39~~	~~45.0~~	14	20.0	1	0.0	15	21.0	20	26.0	15	21.0	26	32.0	165.0	120.0
13	DEN	Valdemar Bandalowski	Not documented	D 84	18	24.0	30	36.0	~~57~~	~~63.0~~	19	25.0	11	17.0	5	10.0	5	10.0	185.0	122.0
14	DEN	Jens Ranlov	Not documented	D 89	4	8.0	~~PMS~~	~~85.0~~	14	20.0	40	46.0	19	25.0	8	14.0	12	18.0	216.0	131.0
15	CAN	Bill Abbott Jr.	Don Beatty; Larry Abbott	KC 1	38	44.0	11	17.0	5	10.0	~~RET~~	~~85.0~~	4	8.0	21	27.0	22	28.0	219.0	134.0
16	URS	Boris Budnikov	Not documented	SR 33	~~34~~	~~40.0~~	15	21.0	7	13.0	30	36.0	30	36.0	11	17.0	6	11.7	174.7	134.7
17	NOR	Terje Wang	Not documented	N 104	13	19.0	10	16.0	~~61~~	~~67.0~~	11	17.0	37	43.0	6	11.7	23	29.0	202.7	135.7
18	SWE	Hans Hamel	Not documented	S 130	31	37.0	19	25.0	31	37.0	5	10.0	10	16.0	10	16.0	~~39~~	~~45.0~~	186.0	141.0
19	DEN	Jesper Bank	Not documented	D 83	27	33.0	13	19.0	22	28.0	21	27.0	13	19.0	~~33~~	~~39.0~~	10	16.0	181.0	142.0
20	USA	Kevin Mahaney	Not documented	US 772	11	17.0	24	30.0	28	34.0	23	29.0	7	13.0	23	29.0	~~34~~	~~40.0~~	192.0	152.0
21	FRG	Jens-Peter Wrede	Not documented	G 261	~~67~~	~~73.0~~	17	23.0	34	40.0	8	14.0	25	31.0	18	24.0	15	21.0	226.0	153.0
22	FIN	Kenneth Thelen	Not documented	L 48	15	21.0	~~36~~	~~42.0~~	23	29.0	7	13.0	31	37.0	28	34.0	20	26.0	202.0	160.0
23	SWE	Martin Palsson	Klaes Mattsson; Johan Barne	S 137	37	43.0	6	11.7	33	39.0	20	26.0	~~45~~	~~51.0~~	13	19.0	24	30.0	219.7	168.7
24	BRA	Torben Grael	Not documented	BL 45	3	5.7	35	41.0	21	27.0	~~43~~	~~49.0~~	18	24.0	31	37.0	31	37.0	220.7	171.7
25	NED	Ron van Manen	Not documented	H 24	1	0.0	~~55~~	~~61.0~~	36	42.0	42	48.0	22	28.0	17	23.0	30	36.0	238.0	177.0
26	ITA	Marco Rodolfi	Not documented	I 194	2	3.0	~~PMS~~	~~85.0~~	25	31.0	37	43.0	44	31.0	26	32.0	18	24.0	249.0	164.0
27	FRG	Roman Koch	Maxl Koch; Not documented	G 266	47	53.0	22	28.0	13	19.0	9	15.0	~~52~~	~~58.0~~	40	46.0	17	23.0	242.0	184.0
28	FRG	Wolfgang Gerz	Not documented	G 260	~~49~~	~~55.0~~	33	39.0	15	21.0	22	28.0	17	33.0	25	31.0	43	49.0	256.0	201.0
29	ITA	Flavio Favini	Not documented	I 223	30	36.0	~~DSQ~~	~~85.0~~	9	15.0	16	22.0	39	45.0	34	40.0	33	39.0	282.0	197.0
30	FRG	Thomas Jungblut	Not documented	G 269	20	26.0	~~RET~~	~~85.0~~	PMS	85.0	46	52.0	15	21.0	1	0.0	13	19.0	288.0	203.0
31	AUS	Glen Collings	Not documented	KA 144	~~58~~	~~64.0~~	21	27.0	56	62.0	39	45.0	34	40.0	19	25.0	9	15.0	278.0	214.0
32	DEN	Tommi Krog Hansen	Not documented	D 79	48	54.0	23	29.0	10	16.0	28	34.0	41	47.0	29	35.0	~~50~~	~~56.0~~	271.0	215.0
33	SWE	Arved von Gruenewaldt	Not documented	S 127	17	23.0	47	53.0	29	35.0	27	33.0	24	30.0	46	52.0	~~RET~~	~~85.0~~	311.0	226.0
34	SUI	Luc DuBois	Not documented	Z 258	65	71.0	37	43.0	6	11.7	~~55~~	~~61.0~~	21	27.0	32	38.0	41	47.0	298.7	227.7
35	FRG	Karl Haist	Not documented	G 258	32	38.0	49	55.0	40	46.0	14	20.0	~~63~~	~~69.0~~	9	15.0	51	57.0	300.0	231.0
36	FRA	Patrick Haegeli	Not documented	F 142	19	25.0	42	48.0	27	33.0	~~DSQ~~	~~85.0~~	DSQ	85.0	16	22.0	21	27.0	325.0	240.0
37	NOR	Ole Schoyen	Not documented	N 102	22	28.0	34	40.0	~~54~~	~~60.0~~	33	39.0	27	33.0	51	57.0	38	44.0	301.0	241.0
38	ITA	Silvio Santoni	Not documented	I 220	~~RET~~	~~85.0~~	18	24.0	17	23.0	48	54.0	70	76.0	35	41.0	28	34.0	337.0	252.0
39	ESP	Guillermo Altadill	Not documented	E 140	41	47.0	29	35.0	45	51.0	13	19.0	~~RET~~	~~85.0~~	42	48.0	48	54.0	339.0	254.0
40	ITA	Antonio Lanza	Not documented	I 193	44	50.0	43	49.0	19	25.0	26	32.0	49	55.0	45	51.0	~~RET~~	~~85.0~~	347.0	262.0
41	USA	Stuart H. Walker	Not documented	US 725	24	30.0	51	57.0	16	22.0	57	63.0	36	42.0	~~63~~	~~69.0~~	45	51.0	334.0	265.0
42	SWE	Jorgen Rosengren	Not documented	S 136	53	59.0	~~DSQ~~	~~85.0~~	PMS	85.0	18	24.0	35	41.0	30	36.0	19	25.0	355.0	270.0
43	FRG	Daniel Diesing	Not documented	G 251	5	10.0	~~PMS~~	~~85.0~~	PMS	85.0	50	56.0	42	48.0	20	26.0	44	50.0	360.0	275.0
44	SWE	Hedlund Marten	Not documented	S 132	33	39.0	63	69.0	26	32.0	24	30.0	~~PMS~~	~~85.0~~	36	42.0	57	63.0	319.0	250.0
45	GBR	Graham Baily	Not documented	K 141	50	56.0	16	22.0	37	43.0	~~66~~	~~72.0~~	55	61.0	50	56.0	35	41.0	351.0	279.0
46	FRA	Babou Pastureau	Not documented	F 151	42	48.0	31	37.0	~~63~~	~~69.0~~	58	64.0	33	39.0	39	45.0	40	46.0	348.0	279.0
47	SUI	Jurg Menzi	Not documented	Z 250	29	35.0	39	45.0	53	59.0	60	66.0	28	34.0	~~RET~~	~~85.0~~	37	43.0	367.0	282.0
48	SWE	Henrik Lundberg	Not documented	S 129	43	49.0	40	46.0	47	53.0	34	40.0	~~56~~	~~62.0~~	37	43.0	46	52.0	345.0	283.0
49	SUI	Roger Guignard	Not documented	Z 259	~~DSQ~~	~~85.0~~	25	31.0	43	49.0	53	59.0	26	32.0	38	44.0	62	68.0	368.0	283.0
50	FRA	Pierre Souben	Not documented	F 129	28	34.0	~~53~~	~~59.0~~	50	56.0	35	41.0	51	57.0	48	54.0	42	48.0	349.0	290.0
51	AUS	Gar Shear	Not documented	KA 167	62	68.0	26	32.0	32	38.0	~~63~~	~~69.0~~	43	49.0	59	65.0	36	42.0	363.0	294.0
52	AUS	Murray Scott Smith	Not documented	KA158	23	29.0	52	58.0	58	64.0	47	53.0	54	60.0	~~60~~	~~66.0~~	27	33.0	363.0	297.0
53	SUI	Heiki Blok	Not documented	Z 267	~~64~~	~~70.0~~	27	33.0	46	52.0	41	47.0	32	38.0	61	67.0	55	61.0	368.0	298.0
54	GBR	William Henderson	Not documented	K 133	51	57.0	45	51.0	49	55.0	~~52~~	~~58.0~~	46	52.0	41	47.0	32	38.0	358.0	300.0
55	SWE	Torbjorn Hansson	Not documented	S 138	56	62.0	50	56.0	~~DSQ~~	~~85.0~~	51	57.0	23	29.0	YMP	51.0	YMP	51.0	391.0	306.0
56	NED	Kees Schriel	Theo de Lange	H 20	26	32.0	41	47.0	42	48.0	44	50.0	60	66.0	64	70.0	~~RET~~	~~85.0~~	398.0	313.0
57	NED	Frank Verhagen	Not documented	H 21	40	46.0	32	38.0	52	58.0	67	73.0	38	44.0	49	55.0	~~DSQ~~	~~85.0~~	399.0	314.0
58	FRG	Wilhelm Schweppe	Not documented	G 207	52	58.0	20	26.0	~~RET~~	~~85.0~~	36	42.0	48	54.0	43	49.0	DNS	85.0	399.0	314.0
59	FRA	Jean-Yves Furic	Not documented	F 149	45	51.0	46	52.0	51	57.0	31	37.0	58	64.0	57	63.0	~~63~~	~~69.0~~	393.0	324.0
60	SWE	Per Cederholm	Not documented	S 128	~~59~~	~~65.0~~	48	54.0	41	47.0	62	68.0	40	46.0	52	58.0	52	58.0	396.0	328.0
61	SWE	Mats Persson	Not documented	S 118	46	52.0	54	60.0	35	41.0	~~61~~	~~67.0~~	53	59.0	47	53.0	60	66.0	398.0	331.0
62	GBR	Ted Fort	Not documented	K 127	36	42.0	61	67.0	62	68.0	49	55.0	~~64~~	~~70.0~~	44	50.0	59	65.0	417.0	347.0
63	NED	Rudy den Outer	Job Westening	H 22	66	72.0	38	44.0	39	45.0	~~71~~	~~77.0~~	47	53.0	65	71.0	61	67.0	429.0	352.0
64	SUI	Jurg Scheidegger	Not documented	Z 235	55	61.0	66	72.0	48	54.0	45	51.0	~~PMS~~	~~85.0~~	58	64.0	56	62.0	449.0	364.0
65	FRA	Yves Steff	Not documented	F 145	~~75~~	~~81.0~~	57	63.0	55	61.0	32	38.0	68	74.0	66	72.0	54	60.0	449.0	368.0
66	FRA	Jimmy Pahun	Not documented	F 126	60	66.0	44	50.0	~~DSQ~~	~~85.0~~	56	62.0	65	71.0	62	68.0	47	53.0	455.0	370.0
67	CAN	Bill Abbott Sr.	Not documented	KC 175	57	63.0	60	66.0	38	44.0	59	65.0	59	65.0	~~67~~	~~73.0~~	65	71.0	447.0	374.0
68	FRG	Werner Wilke	Not documented	G 216	72	78.0	68	74.0	67	73.0	38	44.0	50	56.0	54	60.0	~~DNS~~	~~85.0~~	470.0	385.0
69	AUS	Joan Harvey	Not documented	KA 166	54	60.0	56	62.0	65	71.0	~~72~~	~~78.0~~	66	72.0	68	74.0	49	55.0	472.0	394.0
70	FRA	Patrick de Pimodan	Not documented	F 139	68	74.0	67	73.0	59	65.0	~~65~~	~~71.0~~	57	63.0	56	62.0	58	64.0	472.0	398.0
71	FRA	Jean Cormier	Not documented	F 136	63	69.0	58	64.0	~~68~~	~~74.0~~	64	70.0	61	67.0	53	59.0	68	74.0	477.0	403.0
72	SUI	Gottlieb Horak	Not documented	Z 262	61	67.0	71	77.0	60	66.0	~~73~~	~~79.0~~	62	68.0	55	61.0	67	73.0	491.0	412.0
73	SUI	Jacques Schar	Not documented	Z 264	71	77.0	70	76.0	66	72.0	70	76.0	67	73.0	~~RET~~	~~85.0~~	53	59.0	518.0	433.0
74	FRA	Benoit Giry	Not documented	F 148	~~76~~	~~82.0~~	69	75.0	64	70.0	68	74.0	69	75.0	69	75.0	66	72.0	523.0	441.0
75	FRA	Phillippe Richard	Not documented	F 138	73	79.0	64	70.0	70	76.0	74	80.0	72	78.0	~~DSQ~~	~~85.0~~	64	70.0	538.0	453.0
76	FRA	Alain Guillou	Not documented	F 125	69	75.0	65	71.0	69	75.0	69	75.0	71	77.0	~~RET~~	~~85.0~~	DNS	85.0	543.0	458.0
77	FRG	Ernest Wunder	Not documented	G 254	70	76.0	62	68.0	~~PMS~~	~~85.0~~	RET	85.0	DNS	85.0	DNS	85.0	DNS	85.0	569.0	484.0
78	FRA	Maxmilien Brabec	Not documented	F 134	74	80.0	~~DNS~~	~~85.0~~	DNS	85.0	DNS	85.0	DNS	85.0	DNS	85.0	RET	85.0	590.0	505.0

Legend: DNF – Did not finish; DNS – Did not start; DSQ – Disqualified;
Discard is crossed out and does not count for the overall result.

- 1986 Progress

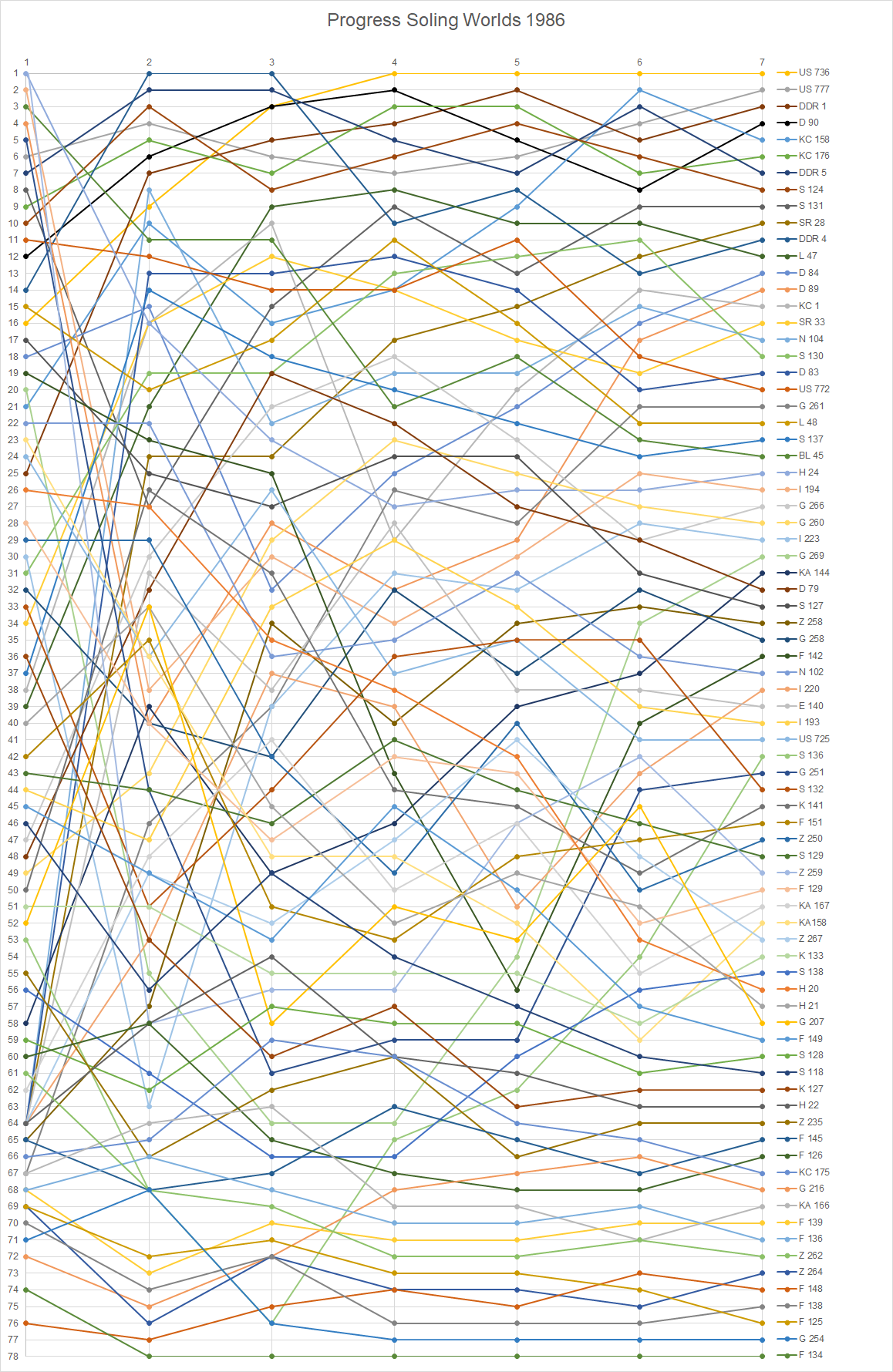

== 1987 Final results ==
1987
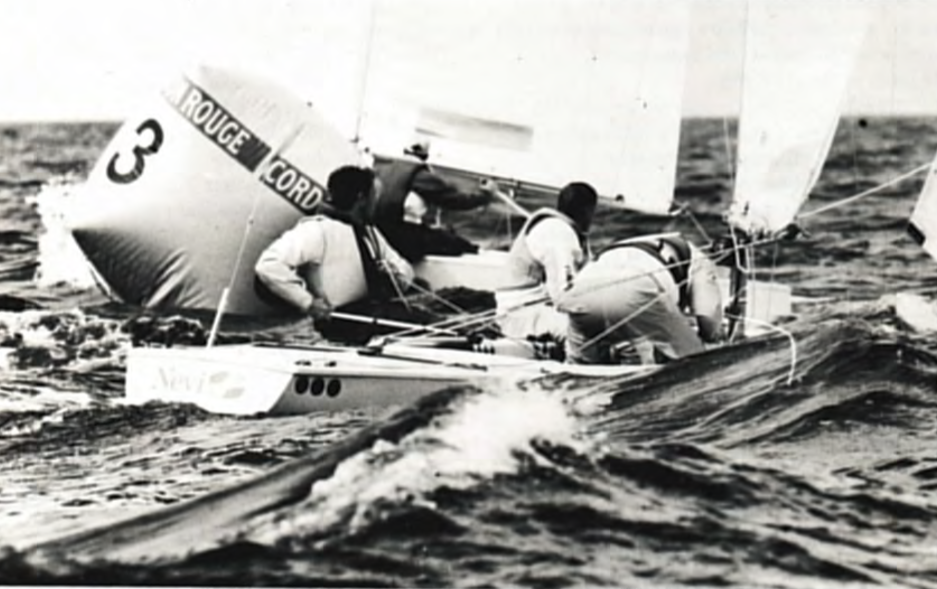

Event title
- Edition: 20
- Host: Kieler Yacht-Club

Event details
- Venue: Schilksee, Kiel, West Germany
- Dates: 14–20 June
- Yachts: 86
- Opening ceremony: 14 June

Competitors
- Competitors: 258
- Competing nations: 24

Results
- (gold) Gold: East Germany; Helmar Nauck; Norbert Hellriegel; Sven Diedering
- (silver) Silver: United States; John Kostecki; William Baylis; Robert Billingham
- (bronze) Bronze: Soviet Union; Georgy Shayduko; Nikolay Polyakov; Sergey Kanov

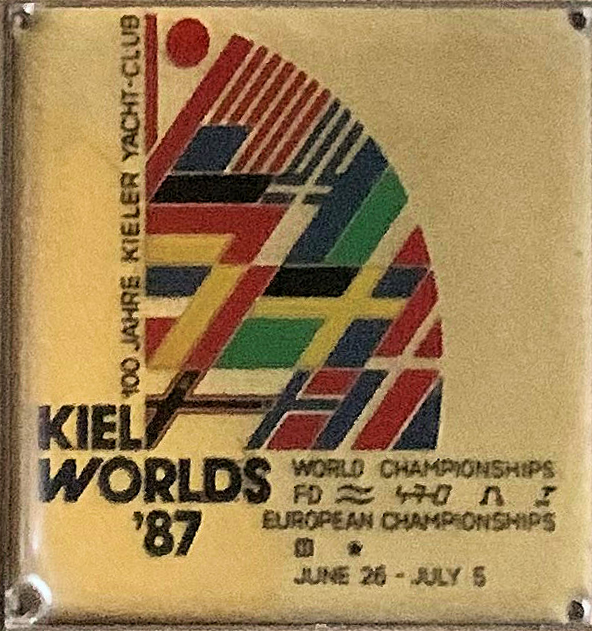
Picture of the Kiel Worlds 1987 enamel plaque

Rank	Country	Helmsman	Crew	Sail No.	Race 1		Race 2		Race 3		Race 4		Race 5		Race 6		Race 7		Total	Total – discard
Rank	Country	Helmsman	Crew	Sail No.	Pos.	Pts.	Pos.	Pts.	Pos.	Pts.	Pos.	Pts.	Pos.	Pts.	Pos.	Pts.	Pos.	Pts.	Total	Total – discard
1st place, gold medalist(s)	GDR	Helmar Nauck	Norbert Hellriegel; Sven Diedering	DDR 4	~~18~~	~~24.0~~	13	19.0	13	19.0	10	16.0	5	10.0	2	3.0	14	20.0	111.0	87.0
2nd place, silver medalist(s)	USA	John Kostecki	Robert Billingham; William Baylis	US 736	15	21.0	~~27~~	~~33.0~~	4	8.0	2	3.0	13	19.0	14	20.0	12	18.0	122.0	89.0
3rd place, bronze medalist(s)	URS	Georgy Shayduko	Sergey Kanov; Nikolay Polyakov	SR 41	20	26.0	4	8.0	~~24~~	~~30.0~~	7	13.0	12	18.0	20	26.0	1	0.0	121.0	91.0
4	USA	Dave Curtis	Wally Corwin; Murphy	US 777	8	14.0	10	16.0	~~27~~	~~33.0~~	8	14.0	10	16.0	21	27.0	5	10.0	130.0	97.0
5	DEN	Valdemar Bandolowski	Leroy; Larsen	D 84	~~27~~	~~33.0~~	21	27.0	11	17.0	9	15.0	3	5.7	10	16.0	21	27.0	140.7	107.7
6	FRG	Jörg Diesch	Eckart Diesch; Rupert Diesch	G 259	35	41.0	~~49~~	~~55.0~~	5	10.0	36	42.0	7	13.0	1	0.0	4	8.0	169.0	114.0
7	SWE	Lennart Persson	Eje Öberg; Tony Wallin	S 124	10	16.0	5	10.0	~~52~~	~~58.0~~	6	11.7	42	48.0	7	13.0	13	19.0	175.7	117.7
8	USA	Scott Mason	Twist; Davis	US 716	25	31.0	24	30.0	~~40~~	~~46.0~~	21	27.0	2	3.0	18	24.0	2	3.0	164.0	118.0
9	CAN	Hans Fogh	Steve Calder; Hank Lammens	KC 181	21	27.0	11	17.0	18	24.0	18	24.0	9	15.0	12	18.0	~~48~~	~~54.0~~	179.0	125.0
10	ITA	Gianluca Lamaro	Aurelio Dalla Vecchia; Valerio Romano	I 209	22	28.0	6	11.7	14	20.0	24	30.0	16	22.0	4	8.0	~~30~~	~~36.0~~	155.7	119.7
11	FRG	Thomas Jungblut	Thomas Maschkiwitz; T. Kroger	G 269	37	43.0	19	25.0	7	13.0	~~DNF~~	~~93.0~~	8	14.0	13	19.0	8	14.0	221.0	128.0
12	ITA	Flavio Favini	Marco di Natale; Roberto Passoni	I 223	16	22.0	22	28.0	~~30~~	~~36.0~~	11	17.0	21	27.0	9	15.0	18	24.0	169.0	133.0
13	USA	Kevin Mahaney	Nelson; Lance Mahaney	US 772	7	13.0	7	13.0	25	31.0	12	18.0	34	40.0	~~46~~	~~52.0~~	19	25.0	192.0	140.0
14	BRA	Torben Grael	Daniel Adler; Roberto Senfft	BL 45	13	19.0	~~DNF~~	~~93.0~~	8	14.0	19	25.0	1	0.0	25	31.0	46	52.0	234.0	141.0
15	SWE	Hans Hamel	Malmgren; Sandberg	S 130	2	3.0	12	18.0	32	38.0	32	38.0	33	39.0	11	17.0	~~43~~	~~49.0~~	202.0	153.0
16	DEN	Jesper Bank	Jan Mathiasen; Steen Secher	D 92	1	0.0	8	14.0	31	37.0	38	44.0	19	25.0	~~41~~	~~47.0~~	28	34.0	201.0	154.0
17	FIN	Lundberg	Borenius; Jansson	L 50	14	20.0	20	26.0	3	5.7	~~54~~	~~60.0~~	27	33.0	28	34.0	31	37.0	215.7	155.7
18	CAN	Bill Abbott Jr.	Don Beatty; Larry Abbott	KC 1	12	18.0	~~48~~	~~54.0~~	2	3.0	25	31.0	23	29.0	24	30.0	41	47.0	212.0	158.0
19	FRA	Patrick Haegeli	Vanier; Borde	F 142	9	15.0	42	48.0	28	34.0	16	22.0	6	11.7	~~PMS~~	~~93.0~~	26	32.0	255.7	162.7
20	FIN	Tom Jungell	Mannstroem; Harima	L 47	51	57.0	~~DSQ~~	~~93.0~~	16	22.0	35	41.0	15	21.0	6	11.7	6	11.7	257.4	164.4
21	USA	Cobb	Hupkins; Not documented	US 779	5	10.0	16	22.0	26	32.0	31	37.0	20	26.0	35	41.0	~~DNS~~	~~93.0~~	261.0	168.0
22	URS	Serhiy Pichuhin	Oleg Miron; Gennedi Strakh	SR 33	11	17.0	23	29.0	19	25.0	~~64~~	~~70.0~~	49	55.0	17	23.0	17	23.0	242.0	172.0
23	FIN	Kenneth Thelen	Henrik Thelen; Juha Valtanen	L 48	38	44.0	53	59.0	9	15.0	3	5.7	25	31.0	15	21.0	~~55~~	~~61.0~~	236.7	175.7
24	ITA	Marco Rodolfi	Bergamaschi de Martino	I 194	65	71.0	2	3.0	6	11.7	~~DSQ~~	~~93.0~~	54	60.0	5	10.0	16	22.0	270.7	177.7
25	USA	Don Cohan	Larry Klein; Brad Dellenbaugh	US 751	46	52.0	32	38.0	22	28.0	YMP	33.0	~~47~~	~~53.0~~	8	14.0	10	16.0	234.0	181.0
26	NOR	Terje Wang	Petterson; Malm	N 104	4	8.0	18	24.0	23	29.0	55	61.0	DSQ	31.0	~~43~~	~~49.0~~	7	13.0	215.0	154.0
27	NOR	Dag Usterud	Johansen; Børre Skui	N 111	36	42.0	~~63~~	~~69.0~~	1	0.0	29	35.0	24	30.0	50	56.0	20	26.0	258.0	189.0
28	GDR	Jochen Schümann	Thomas Flach; Bernd Jäkel	DDR 1	40	46.0	51	57.0	44	50.0	1	0.0	30	33.0	3	5.7	~~PMS~~	~~93.0~~	284.7	191.7
29	CAN	Paul Thomson	Phillip Gow; Stuart Flinn	KC 158	3	5.7	~~DNF~~	~~93.0~~	10	16.0	17	23.0	22	28.0	56	62.0	58	64.0	291.7	198.7
30	FRG	Jens-Peter Wrede	Stefan Knabe; Matthias Adamczewski	G 261	34	40.0	3	5.7	48	54.0	4	8.0	58	64.0	~~PMS~~	~~93.0~~	24	30.0	294.7	201.7
31	NZL	Russell Coutts	Robinson; Hansen	KZ 20	~~48~~	~~54.0~~	33	39.0	20	26.0	43	49.0	17	23.0	34	40.0	23	29.0	260.0	206.0
32	FRG	Grahl	Cordes; Kosak	G 244	49	55.0	38	44.0	35	41.0	~~61~~	~~67.0~~	28	34.0	16	22.0	9	15.0	278.0	211.0
33	AUS	Collings	Collings; Drennan	KA 163	43	49.0	45	51.0	33	39.0	37	43.0	18	24.0	~~52~~	~~58.0~~	3	5.7	269.7	211.7
34	SWE	Mats Persson	Petersson; Björn Alm	S 118	19	25.0	34	40.0	12	18.0	~~47~~	~~53.0~~	37	43.0	40	46.0	35	41.0	266.0	213.0
35	SWE	Peter Holmberg	Holmqvist; Abenuis	S 135	26	32.0	26	32.0	34	40.0	45	51.0	31	37.0	22	28.0	~~53~~	~~59.0~~	279.0	220.0
36	AUS	Wilmot	Wilmot; Percy	KA 168	58	64.0	1	0.0	46	52.0	~~PMS~~	~~93.0~~	14	20.0	49	55.0	33	39.0	323.0	230.0
37	SWE	Martin Palsson	Wickman; Mattsson	S 137	17	23.0	~~74~~	~~80.0~~	41	47.0	20	26.0	53	59.0	30	36.0	36	42.0	313.0	233.0
38	GRE	Tassos Boudouris	Dimitrios Deligiannis; Benakis	GR 69	30	36.0	52	58.0	39	45.0	5	10.0	~~DNF~~	~~93.0~~	31	37.0	42	48.0	327.0	234.0
39	DEN	Jens Ranlov	Hemmingsen; Besser	D 89	~~DSQ~~	~~93.0~~	9	15.0	50	56.0	46	52.0	38	44.0	23	29.0	34	40.0	329.0	236.0
40	GDR	Völker	Laurent Scheel; Voigt	DDR 3	56	62.0	25	31.0	29	35.0	15	21.0	39	45.0	45	51.0	~~PMS~~	~~93.0~~	338.0	245.0
41	JPN	Kazunori Komatsu	Kazuo Hanaoka; Tadashi Ikeda	J 33	6	11.7	44	50.0	51	57.0	22	28.0	45	51.0	42	48.0	~~56~~	~~62.0~~	307.7	245.7
42	FRG	Willy Kuhweide	Karsten Meyer; Axel May	G 267	52	58.0	~~58~~	~~64.0~~	43	49.0	26	32.0	40	46.0	38	44.0	15	21.0	314.0	250.0
43	FRA	Chourgnoz	Herpin; Pelegri	F 150	~~66~~	~~72.0~~	17	23.0	17	23.0	41	47.0	66	72.0	63	69.0	11	17.0	323.0	251.0
44	DEN	Hansen	Hansen; Lindqviust	D 79	22	28.0	37	43.0	~~67~~	~~73.0~~	28	34.0	32	44.0	53	59.0	45	51.0	332.0	259.0
45	AUS	Allsep	Gash; Read	KA 166	24	30.0	15	21.0	49	55.0	33	39.0	51	57.0	48	54.0	~~52~~	~~58.0~~	314.0	256.0
46	SWE	Gidfors	Pettersson; Gille	S 133	39	45.0	35	41.0	~~74~~	~~80.0~~	34	40.0	61	67.0	26	32.0	49	55.0	360.0	280.0
47	SWE	Hansson	Hansson; Hansson	S 138	60	66.0	36	42.0	15	21.0	30	36.0	64	70.0	47	53.0	~~PMS~~	~~93.0~~	381.0	288.0
48	FRG	Andy Vincon	Doersch; Goetz	G 260	44	50.0	29	35.0	60	66.0	50	56.0	41	47.0	~~62~~	~~68.0~~	32	38.0	360.0	292.0
49	AUT	Uli Strohschneider	Hannes Blaschke; Georg Stadler	OE 73	47	53.0	~~61~~	~~67.0~~	56	62.0	27	33.0	50	56.0	51	57.0	27	33.0	361.0	294.0
50	AUT	Carl Auteried Jr.	Neifing; Beclin	OE 97	29	35.0	14	20.0	38	44.0	52	58.0	73	79.0	58	64.0	~~DNF~~	~~93.0~~	393.0	300.0
51	POL	Rycmcik	Szymczak; Ploski	PZ 7	68	74.0	~~60~~	~~66.0~~	57	63.0	13	19.0	43	49.0	36	42.0	57	63.0	376.0	302.0
52	HUN	Rujak	Recz; Vajta	M 77	64	70.0	39	45.0	~~DSQ~~	~~93.0~~	53	59.0	59	65.0	32	38.0	22	28.0	398.0	305.0
53	IND	Mongia	Verghese; Rao	IND 1	23	29.0	70	76.0	58	64.0	14	20.0	~~84~~	~~90.0~~	77	83.0	29	35.0	397.0	307.0
54	FRG	Karl Haist	S. Nikolaus; Meyer	G 258	45	51.0	~~59~~	~~65.0~~	55	61.0	48	54.0	26	32.0	44	50.0	54	60.0	373.0	308.0
55	SWE	Erik Thorsell	Wallenberg; Unger	S 122	31	37.0	56	62.0	47	53.0	40	46.0	44	50.0	57	63.0	~~DNS~~	~~93.0~~	404.0	311.0
56	NED	Ron van Manen	Gijs Evers; Martin Coffeng	H 26	54	60.0	28	34.0	~~PMS~~	~~93.0~~	23	29.0	29	35.0	55	61.0	PMS	93.0	405.0	312.0
57	SWE	Spaengs	Osterberg; Tornsten	S 131	28	34.0	~~DNF~~	~~93.0~~	21	27.0	PMS	93.0	11	17.0	37	43.0	DNS	93.0	400.0	307.0
58	SWE	Hedlund	Schildt; Mattsson	S 132	63	69.0	69	75.0	42	48.0	62	68.0	4	8.0	54	60.0	~~DNS~~	~~93.0~~	421.0	328.0
59	GBR	Glynn Charles	McMiIIan; Andy Beadsworth	K 146	~~74~~	~~80.0~~	47	53.0	75	81.0	39	45.0	68	74.0	27	33.0	38	44.0	410.0	329.0
60	FRG	Daniel Diesing	Schlitter; Stryie	G 271	72	78.0	43	49.0	~~PMS~~	~~93.0~~	57	63.0	36	42.0	29	35.0	50	56.0	416.0	323.0
61	FRG	Pflueger	Peuker; Jacobso	G 233	~~76~~	~~82.0~~	50	56.0	61	67.0	67	73.0	67	73.0	33	39.0	25	31.0	421.0	339.0
62	USA	Stuart H. Walker	Philips; Dunn	US 725	57	63.0	46	52.0	70	76.0	56	62.0	35	41.0	~~DNF~~	~~93.0~~	40	46.0	433.0	340.0
63	FRA	Yves Steff	le Guiliou; Lemette	F 145	55	61.0	~~66~~	~~72.0~~	63	69.0	59	65.0	55	61.0	39	45.0	39	45.0	418.0	346.0
64	ESP	Turro	Valades; Monjo	E 140	59	65.0	64	70.0	64	70.0	~~PMS~~	~~93.0~~	62	68.0	19	25.0	44	50.0	441.0	348.0
65	NED	Rudy den Outer	Theo de Lange; Robert Molsbergen	H 22	62	68.0	31	37.0	~~PMS~~	~~93.0~~	49	55.0	60	66.0	74	80.0	37	43.0	442.0	349.0
66	NED	Fred lmhoff	Jos Schrier; Frank Steeneken	H 25	50	56.0	75	81.0	37	43.0	42	48.0	48	54.0	~~PMS~~	~~93.0~~	62	68.0	443.0	350.0
67	FRG	Roman Koch	Maxl Koch; Jakob	G 266	33	39.0	54	60.0	45	51.0	51	57.0	70	76.0	72	78.0	~~DNS~~	~~93.0~~	454.0	361.0
68	LIE	Nikki Seemann	Seemann von Liechtenstein	FL 2	42	48.0	68	74.0	59	65.0	~~69~~	~~75.0~~	52	58.0	65	71.0	50	56.0	447.0	372.0
69	FRG	Achim Kadelbach	Baumeyer; Pochhamme	G 255	53	59.0	65	71.0	62	68.0	60	66.0	56	62.0	59	65.0	~~DNS~~	~~93.0~~	484.0	391.0
70	FRG	Stache	Buhtz; Fletch	G 230	73	79.0	41	47.0	36	42.0	63	69.0	74	80.0	69	75.0	~~DNF~~	~~93.0~~	485.0	392.0
71	ITA	Ciferri	Ravarotto; Mondani	I 201	67	73.0	30	36.0	72	78.0	65	71.0	65	71.0	60	66.0	~~DNF~~	~~93.0~~	488.0	395.0
72	NOR	Schoeyen	Danialsen; Schoeyen	N 102	69	75.0	40	46.0	~~PMS~~	~~93.0~~	44	50.0	57	63.0	64	70.0	PMS	93.0	490.0	397.0
73	NOR	Lie	Faeste; Faeste	N 87	~~82~~	~~88.0~~	72	78.0	76	82.0	71	77.0	46	52.0	66	72.0	59	65.0	514.0	426.0
74	SWE	Rosengren	Svensson; Olsson	S 136	41	47.0	55	61.0	~~PMS~~	~~93.0~~	YMP	71.0	72	78.0	71	77.0	DNF	93.0	520.0	427.0
75	FRG	Baumueller	Schorr; Louis	G 252	~~83~~	~~89.0~~	57	63.0	69	75.0	73	79.0	79	85.0	75	81.0	51	57.0	529.0	440.0
76	GRE	Papazoglou	Niforos; Neopoulo	GR 26	61	67.0	80	86.0	65	71.0	76	82.0	~~80~~	~~86.0~~	78	84.0	47	53.0	529.0	443.0
77	SUI	Jurg Menzi	Fumasoli; Christen	Z 250	DSQ	93.0	62	68.0	54	60.0	58	64.0	63	69.0	~~DNS~~	~~93.0~~	DNS	93.0	540.0	447.0
78	FRA	de Pimodan	Maravai; Fontenea	F 139	75	81.0	71	77.0	66	72.0	70	76.0	69	75.0	73	79.0	~~PMS~~	~~93.0~~	553.0	460.0
79	FRG	Ross	Bogun; Rohwed	G 212	77	83.0	79	85.0	68	74.0	68	74.0	71	77.0	67	73.0	~~DNF~~	~~93.0~~	559.0	466.0
80	FRG	Hans Heitmann	Martin Heitmann; Mathias Heitmann	G 215	80	86.0	77	83.0	71	77.0	66	72.0	81	87.0	61	67.0	~~DNS~~	~~93.0~~	565.0	472.0
81	FRG	Michael Dietzel	Lederer; Schmid	G 187	71	77.0	76	82.0	73	79.0	74	80.0	75	81.0	68	74.0	~~DNS~~	~~93.0~~	566.0	473.0
82	POR	Antonio Tanger	Heimann; Canyolla	P 9	78	84.0	73	79.0	53	59.0	~~DNS~~	~~93.0~~	78	84.0	70	76.0	DNS	93.0	568.0	475.0
83	FRA	Jean-Marie le Guillou	le Signeu le Guillou	F 153	79	85.0	67	73.0	79	85.0	72	78.0	77	83.0	76	82.0	~~DNF~~	~~93.0~~	579.0	486.0
84	FRA	Steff	Baudu; Marcha	F 81	81	87.0	~~DNF~~	~~93.0~~	78	84.0	77	83.0	76	82.0	79	85.0	61	67.0	581.0	488.0
85	FRG	Herzer	Herzer; Bertsch	G 228	84	90.0	78	84.0	80	86.0	75	81.0	83	89.0	80	86.0	~~DNS~~	~~93.0~~	609.0	516.0
86	FRG	Hiss	Seamann; Carstens	G 256	70	76.0	YMP	86.6	77	83.0	~~DNS~~	~~93.0~~	82	88.0	PMS	93.0	DNS	93.0	612.6	519.6

Legend: DNF – Did not finish; DNS – Did not start; DSQ – Disqualified; PMS – Premature start; RET – Retired;
Discard is crossed out and does not count for the overall result.

- 1987 Progres

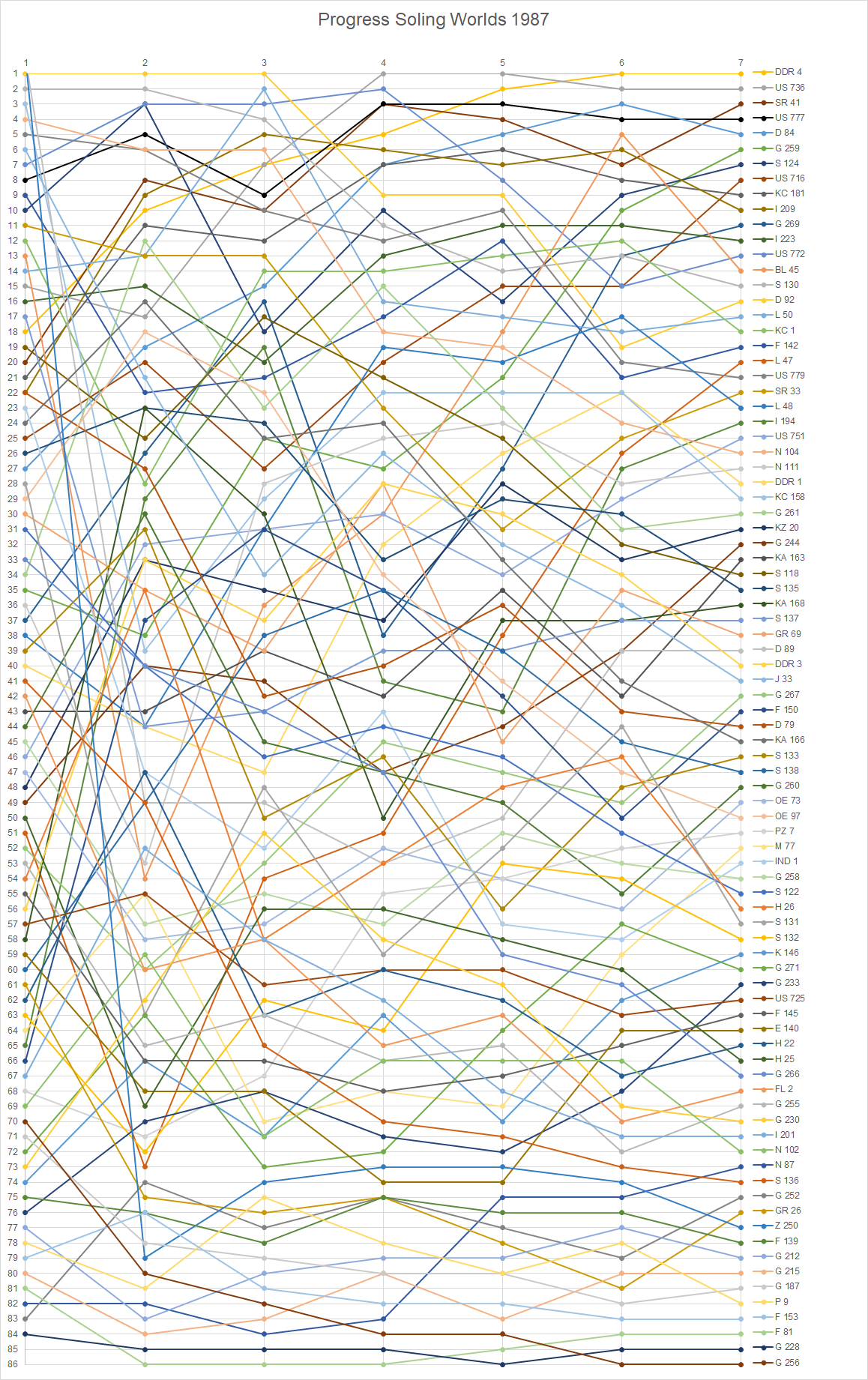

== 1988 Final results ==
1988
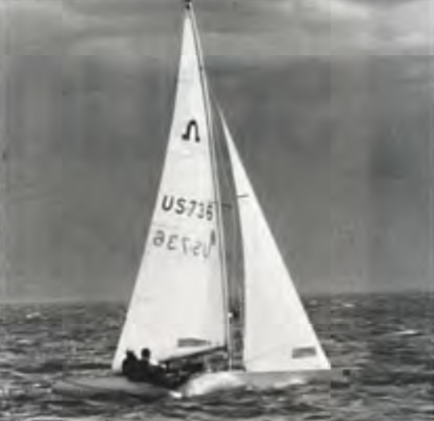

Event title
- Edition: 21
- Host: Royal Melbourne Yacht Squadron

Event details
- Venue: Melbourne, Australia
- Dates: 6–12 January
- Yachts: 46
- Opening ceremony: 6 January

Competitors
- Competitors: 138
- Competing nations: 15

Results
- (gold) Gold: United States; John Kostecki; William Baylis; Bob Billingham
- (silver) Silver: United States; Dave Curtis; Paul Murphy; Wally Corwin
- (bronze) Bronze: Australia; Gary Sheard; Crew not documented

Rank	Country	Helmsman	Crew	Sail No.	Race 1		Race 2		Race 3		Race 4		Race 5		Race 6		Race 7		Total	Total – discard
Rank	Country	Helmsman	Crew	Sail No.	Pos.	Pts.	Pos.	Pts.	Pos.	Pts.	Pos.	Pts.	Pos.	Pts.	Pos.	Pts.	Pos.	Pts.	Total	Total – discard
1st place, gold medalist(s)	USA	John Kostecki	Robert Billingham; William Baylis	US 736	2	3.0	5	10.0	6	11.7	1	0.0	~~10~~	~~16.0~~	1	0.0	3	5.7	46.4	30.4
2nd place, silver medalist(s)	USA	Dave Curtis	Wally Corwin; Paul Murphy	US 777	1	0.0	2	3.0	3	5.7	3	5.7	~~13~~	~~19.0~~	5	10.0	5	10.0	53.4	34.4
3rd place, bronze medalist(s)	AUS	Gary Sheard	Tim Dorning; Dean Gordon	KA 165	12	18.0	15	21.0	~~19~~	~~25.0~~	2	3.0	2	3.0	9	15.0	10	16.0	101.0	76.0
4	SWE	Martin Palsson	Not documented	S 140	11	17.0	13	19.0	5	10.0	7	13.0	~~31~~	~~37.0~~	2	3.0	9	15.0	114.0	77.0
5	NZL	Russell Coutts	Not documented	KZ 20	15	21.0	~~21~~	~~27.0~~	4	8.0	10	16.0	16	22.0	8	14.0	2	3.0	111.0	84.0
6	DEN	Jesper Bank	Jan Mathiasen; Steen Secher	D 92	5	10.0	6	11.7	1	0.0	21	27.0	19	25.0	7	13.0	~~PMS~~	~~53.0~~	139.7	86.7
7	USA	Kevin Mahaney	Not documented	US 787	6	11.7	12	18.0	7	13.0	8	14.0	~~18~~	~~24.0~~	13	19.0	6	11.7	111.4	87.4
8	CAN	Hans Fogh	Not documented	KC 181	20	26.0	1	0.0	17	23.0	6	11.7	20	26.0	4	8.0	~~24~~	~~30.0~~	124.7	94.7
9	ITA	Flavio Favini	Marco di Natale; Roberto Passoni	I 223	10	16.0	4	8.0	11	17.0	9	15.0	9	15.0	23	29.0	~~26~~	~~32.0~~	132.0	100.0
10	ITA	Tomasso Chieffi	Not documented	I 215	33	39.0	18	24.0	16	22.0	~~DSQ~~	~~53.0~~	4	8.0	16	22.0	1	0.0	168.0	115.0
11	NZL	Tom Dodson	Simon Daubney; Aran Hansen	KZ 16	9	15.0	24	30.0	~~DSQ~~	~~53.0~~	4	8.0	11	17.0	3	5.7	37	43.0	171.7	118.7
12	FRG	Jörg Diesch	Eckart Diesch; Rupert Diesch	G 259	24	30.0	19	25.0	22	28.0	~~DNF~~	~~53.0~~	5	10.0	10	16.0	7	13.0	175.0	122.0
13	AUS	Andy Allsep	Not documented	KA 166	16	22.0	16	22.0	~~33~~	~~39.0~~	30	36.0	1	0.0	22	28.0	8	14.0	161.0	122.0
14	FIN	Tom Jungell	Not documented	L 47	4	8.0	7	13.0	~~DSQ~~	~~53.0~~	26	32.0	14	20.0	26	32.0	12	18.0	176.0	123.0
15	AUS	Bobby Wilmot	Not documented	KA 168	3	5.7	10	16.0	24	30.0	~~DSQ~~	~~53.0~~	7	13.0	6	11.7	PMS	53.0	182.4	129.4
16	FIN	Hendrik Lundberg	Not documented	L 50	7	13.0	17	23.0	13	19.0	12	18.0	~~30~~	~~36.0~~	18	24.0	27	33.0	166.0	130.0
17	GBR	Chris Law	Not documented	K 143	22	28.0	11	17.0	12	18.0	15	21.0	21	27.0	~~DSQ~~	~~53.0~~	15	21.0	185.0	132.0
18	AUS	Glenn Collings	John Collings; Noel Drennan	KA 170	34	40.0	20	26.0	10	16.0	5	10.0	~~25~~	~~31.0~~	12	18.0	25	31.0	172.0	132.0
19	SWE	Hans Hamel	Not documented	S 130	13	19.0	23	29.0	2	3.0	20	26.0	~~PMS~~	~~53.0~~	24	30.0	20	26.0	186.0	133.0
20	FIN	Kenneth Thelen	Henrik Thelen; Juha Valtanen	L 48	8	14.0	~~DNF~~	~~53.0~~	21	27.0	19	25.0	17	23.0	20	26.0	13	19.0	187.0	134.0
21	JPN	Kazunori Komatsu	Kazuo Hanaoka; Tadashi Ikeda	J 33	26	32.0	22	28.0	15	21.0	24	30.0	3	5.7	14	20.0	~~35~~	~~41.0~~	177.7	136.7
22	CAN	Bill Abbott Jr.	Don Beatty; Larry Abbott	KC 1	14	20.0	26	32.0	29	35.0	13	19.0	6	11.7	15	21.0	~~32~~	~~38.0~~	176.7	138.7
23	FRG	Thomas Jungblut	Thomas Maschkiwitz; T. Kroger	G 269	~~DNF~~	~~53.0~~	3	5.7	8	14.0	18	24.0	27	33.0	11	17.0	PMS	53.0	199.7	146.7
24	USA	Scott Mason	Not documented	US 716	~~25~~	~~31.0~~	14	20.0	25	31.0	17	23.0	22	28.0	21	27.0	22	28.0	188.0	157.0
25	NOR	Terje Wang	Not documented	N 107	32	38.0	~~DNF~~	~~53.0~~	27	33.0	16	22.0	12	18.0	19	25.0	16	22.0	211.0	158.0
26	GBR	Glynn Charles	Not documented	K 146	18	24.0	8	14.0	30	36.0	~~DSQ~~	~~53.0~~	23	29.0	29	35.0	18	24.0	215.0	162.0
27	DEN	Valdenar Bandolowski	Not documented	D 94	23	29.0	~~DNF~~	~~53.0~~	26	32.0	23	29.0	PMS	53.0	17	23.0	4	8.0	227.0	174.0
28	AUS	Jamie Wilmot	Not documented	KA 45	31	37.0	~~DNF~~	~~53.0~~	9	15.0	25	31.0	15	21.0	DNF	53.0	14	20.0	230.0	177.0
29	NED	Fred Imhoff	John Hofland Jr. Frank Steeneken	H 25	30	36.0	~~36~~	~~42.0~~	23	29.0	11	17.0	29	35.0	25	31.0	33	39.0	229.0	187.0
30	ITA	Francesco de Angelis	Not documented	I 232	~~39~~	~~45.0~~	9	15.0	35	41.0	32	38.0	32	38.0	34	40.0	11	17.0	234.0	189.0
31	CAN	Paul Thomson	Philip Gow; Stuart Flinn	KC 182	17	23.0	~~DNF~~	~~53.0~~	20	26.0	22	28.0	34	40.0	28	34.0	34	40.0	244.0	191.0
32	SWE	Martin Hedlund	Not documented	S 141	27	33.0	27	33.0	32	38.0	~~37~~	~~43.0~~	8	14.0	31	37.0	30	36.0	234.0	191.0
33	FRA	Patrick Haegeli	Not documented	F 142	19	25.0	32	38.0	~~DSQ~~	~~53.0~~	28	34.0	33	39.0	27	33.0	17	23.0	245.0	192.0
34	ESP	Antonio Gorostegui	Not documented	E 140	35	41.0	25	31.0	18	24.0	29	35.0	~~DNF~~	~~53.0~~	30	36.0	29	35.0	255.0	202.0
35	AUS	Peter Gilmour	Not documented	KA 157	21	27.0	31	37.0	28	34.0	31	37.0	24	30.0	~~DSQ~~	~~53.0~~	31	37.0	255.0	202.0
36	NZL	Gray Gibson	Not documented	KZ 28	28	34.0	28	34.0	~~DSQ~~	~~53.0~~	27	33.0	28	34.0	DNF	53.0	23	29.0	270.0	217.0
37	ITA	Marco Rodolfi	Not documented	I 194	29	35.0	~~DNF~~	~~53.0~~	DSQ	53.0	14	20.0	26	32.0	DNF	53.0	19	25.0	271.0	218.0
38	AUS	Jim Hardy	Not documented	KA 169	37	43.0	29	35.0	31	37.0	33	39.0	~~38~~	~~44.0~~	36	42.0	21	27.0	267.0	223.0
39	USA	Gerard Coleman	Peter Coleman; Paul Coleman	US 769	36	42.0	30	36.0	14	20.0	35	41.0	~~PMS~~	~~53.0~~	33	39.0	PMS	53.0	284.0	231.0
40	AUS	Kim McKendrick	Not documented	KA 154	38	44.0	34	40.0	~~DNF~~	~~53.0~~	34	40.0	35	41.0	32	38.0	36	42.0	298.0	245.0
41	AUS	David Bull	Not documented	KA 122	~~40~~	~~46.0~~	35	41.0	39	45.0	39	45.0	37	43.0	35	41.0	28	34.0	295.0	249.0
42	AUS	Dean McAulay	Not documented	KA 156	~~42~~	~~48.0~~	38	44.0	38	44.0	41	47.0	39	45.0	38	44.0	38	44.0	316.0	268.0
43	AUS	Mark Loveday	Not documented	KA 159	43	49.0	~~DNF~~	~~53.0~~	34	40.0	36	42.0	36	42.0	37	43.0	DNF	53.0	322.0	269.0
44	FRG	Daniel Diesing	Not documented	G 271	44	50.0	37	43.0	36	42.0	38	44.0	40	46.0	~~DNC~~	~~53.0~~	DNC	53.0	331.0	278.0
45	AUS	David James	Not documented	KA 142	41	47.0	33	39.0	37	43.0	40	46.0	~~DNF~~	~~53.0~~	DNF	53.0	DNC	53.0	334.0	281.0
46	AUS	Ross Raine	Not documented	KA 141	45	51.0	39	45.0	40	46.0	42	48.0	41	47.0	~~DNC~~	~~53.0~~	39	45.0	335.0	282.0

Legend: DNF – Did not finish; DNS – Did not start; DSQ – Disqualified; PMS – Premature start; RET – Retired;
Discard is crossed out and does not count for the overall result.

- 1988 Progress

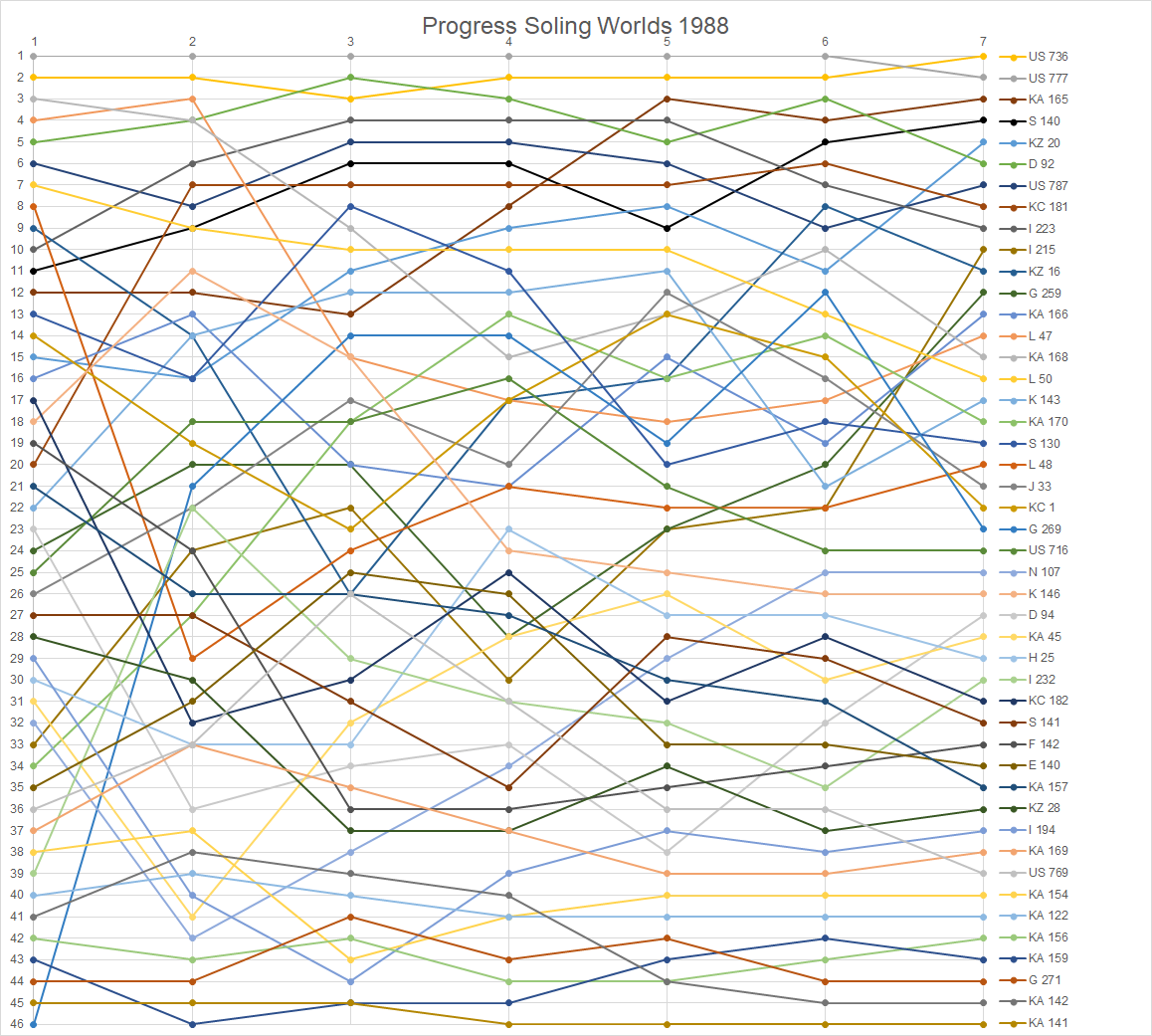

== 1989 Final results ==
1989
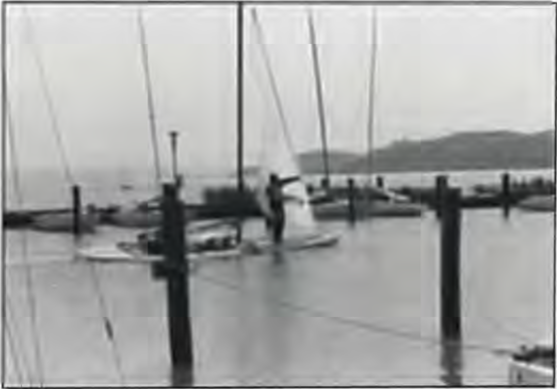

Event title
- Edition: 22
- Host: Balatonfüredi Yacht Club

Event details
- Venue: Balatonfüred, Hungary
- Dates: 9 - 19 May
- Yachts: 79
- Key people: Organization and sponsoring György Wossala
- Opened by: Károly Grósz
- Opening ceremony: 12 May

Competitors
- Competitors: 237
- Competing nations: 21

Championship not completed (lack of wind). However four races were completed. The final results of this series is stated below. The first race was sailed in a storm. During the race winds were reported over 70 km/h. During the start sequens there was even more. Out of 79 boats only 43 made it to the first mark and only 29 to the finish line! The rest of the week was characterize by light air. Since 5 races need to be completed for a valid championship, the team of Denmark won the series but not the World Championship.

Rank	Country	Helmsman	Crew	Sail No.	Race 1		Race 2		Race 3		Race 4		Total
Rank	Country	Helmsman	Crew	Sail No.	Pos.	Pts.	Pos.	Pts.	Pos.	Pts.	Pos.	Pts.	Total
1	DEN	Jesper Bank	Jesper Seier; Steen Secher	D 92	5	10.0	2	3.0	1	0.0	4	8.0	21.0
2	FIN	Kenneth Thelen	Hendrik Thelen; Juha Valtanen	L 48	1	0.0	4	8.0	3	5.7	10	16.0	29.7
3	GDR	Jochen Schümann	Thomas Flach; Bernd Jäkel	DDR 1	11	17.0	9	15.0	4	8.0	2	3.0	43.0
4	GDR	Helmar Nauck	Norbert Hellriegel; Sven Diedering	DDR 4	2	3.0	11	17.0	33	39.0	1	0.0	59.0
5	SWE	Magnus Holmberg	Johan Barne; Björn Alm	S 135	6	11.7	12	18.0	9	15.0	17	23.0	67.7
6	ESP	Antonio Gorostegui	Domingo Manrique; Manuel Doreste	E 221	21	27.0	5	10.0	8	14.0	13	19.0	70.0
7	AUT	Michael Luschan	Georg Stadler; Hannes Blaschke	OE 73	15	21.0	3	5.7	16	22.0	20	26.0	74.7
8	ITA	Flavio Favini	Marco Di_Natale; Alberto Marelli	I 234	8	14.0	10	16.0	25	31.0	8	14.0	75.0
9	GDR	Jörg Herrmann	A. Sczesny; Ingo Herrmann	DDR 5	4	8.0	1	0.0	44	50.0	12	18.0	76.0
10	GDR	Björn Oestereich	Laurent Scheel; Steffen Voigt	DDR 3	3	5.7	7	13.0	50	56.0	14	20.0	94.7
11	SWE	Goeran Sandberg	Jan Bjornberg; Peter Andersson	S 126	14	20.0	46	52.0	13	19.0	3	5.7	96.7
12	ITA	Mario Celon	Claudio Celon; S. Bonetti	I 232	18	24.0	43	49.0	5	10.0	9	15.0	98.0
13	GBR	Rory Bowman	T. Stevens; Mark Ingram	K 147	9	15.0	36	42.0	14	20.0	22	28.0	105.0
14	FRG	Roman Koch	Maxl Koch; D. Link	G 266	27	33.0	45	51.0	7	13.0	5	10.0	107.0
15	FRA	Thierry Peponnet	Daniel Ferre; E. Hubert	F 188	19	25.0	18	24.0	20	26.0	34	40.0	115.0
16	USA	Don Cohan	Wally Corwin; R. Williams	US 801	10	16.0	13	19.0	67	73.0	11	17.0	125.0
17	SWE	Lennart Persson	L. Tornsten; P. Eriksson	S 124	7	13.0	14	20.0	41	47.0	43	49.0	129.0
18	URS	Serhiy Pichuhin	Gennedi Strakh; Andrey Nikandrov	SR 41	DNF	86.0	6	11.7	6	11.7	16	22.0	131.4
19	HUN	György Fináczy	Z. Nagy; G. Galantha	M 25	25	31.0	15	21.0	39	45.0	31	37.0	134.0
20	HUN	A. Korcsog	T. Orszag; V. Hatyka	M 8	22	28.0	26	32.0	40	46.0	27	33.0	139.0
21	SWE	Peter Carlsson	Karl-Otto Strömberg; D. Stenberg	S 131	17	23.0	28	34.0	46	52.0	38	44.0	153.0
22	URS	Sergey Borodinov	Oleg Miron; Nikolay Polyakov	SR 28	DNF	86.0	34	40.0	12	18.0	6	11.7	155.7
23	HUN	Szabolcs Detre	Zsolt Detre; Zoltan Sass	M 63	23	29.0	DSQ	86.0	2	3.0	36	42.0	160.0
24	URS	Alar Volmer	E. Kosk; A. Kruusmagi	SR 30	13	19.0	52	58.0	23	29.0	49	55.0	161.0
25	AUS	William Hodder	J. Collings; C. Rose	KA 172	DNF	86.0	33	39.0	18	24.0	7	33.0	162.0
26	DEN	Morten Henriksen	Per Andersen; Jan Andersen	D 96	DNF	86.0	17	23.0	10	16.0	32	38.0	163.0
27	HUN	T. Stefan	Z. Sabjan; L. Paal	M 6	DNF	86.0	16	22.0	11	17.0	33	39.0	164.0
28	HUN	Miklós Tuss	K. Sardu; S. David	M 81	16	22.0	38	44.0	57	63.0	30	36.0	165.0
29	FRG	H. Gerth	M. Butzke; M. Meier	G 232	DNF	86.0	29	35.0	17	23.0	23	29.0	173.0
30	URS	A. Abruzov	N. Korostelev; D. Shabanov	SR 1	DNF	86.0	8	14.0	42	48.0	21	27.0	175.0
31	ESP	Fernando León	A. Vasquez; J. Vallejo	E 183	12	18.0	RET	86.0	34	40.0	29	35.0	179.0
32	AUS	Jim Hardy	Warwick Anderson; G. Cassidy	KA 169	24	30.0	48	54.0	30	36.0	54	60.0	180.0
33	URS	Tõnu Tõniste	Heiki Tauts; Tilt Vikson	SR 29	DNF	86.0	22	28.0	27	33.0	28	34.0	181.0
34	HUN	I. Rujak	T. Ory; B. Bankuty	M 18	DNF	86.0	35	41.0	28	34.0	15	21.0	182.0
35	URS	V. lgnatenko	Aleksandr Budnikov; Volodymyr Korotkov	SR 3	DNC	86.0	32	38.0	32	38.0	18	24.0	186.0
36	HUN	T. Tusnai	J. Agost; P. Steer	M 71	DNF	86.0	19	25.0	31	37.0	47	53.0	201.0
37	USA	Charlie Kamps	Joe Hoeksema; Toby Kamps	US 715	DNF	86.0	31	37.0	45	51.0	24	30.0	204.0
38	FRG	Thomas Jungblut	Gerrit Bartel; K. Stryi	G 269	28	34.0	41	47.0	37	43.0	PMS	86.0	210.0
39	FRG	W. Oehler	C. Oehler; D. Heitmann	G 244	29	35.0	70	76.0	52	58.0	39	45.0	214.0
40	FRG	B. Blombach	A. Merleved; L. Lange	G 241	26	32.0	39	45.0	78	84.0	48	54.0	215.0
41	GRE	A. Bonas	P. Bisios; I. Agropoulos	GR 31	DNC	86.0	51	57.0	24	30.0	42	48.0	221.0
42	NED	Rudy den_Outer	Erik de Vrijer; Robert Molsbergen	H 22	PMS	86.0	57	63.0	43	49.0	19	25.0	223.0
43	HUN	György Wossala	László Kovácsi; R. Kovacs	M 77	DNF	86.0	21	27.0	74	80.0	25	31.0	224.0
44	HUN	B. Gyenes	B. Balogh; Gábor Meretei	M 13	DNF	86.0	37	43.0	49	55.0	37	43.0	227.0
45	GRE	S. Kanaris	D. Pourantzis; E. Glaridis	GR 30	DNF	86.0	59	65.0	21	27.0	44	50.0	228.0
46	HUN	A. Szekely	M. Csermendy; T. Pomucz	M 7	DNF	86.0	62	68.0	29	35.0	35	41.0	230.0
47	FRG	Jens-Peter Wrede	Stefan Knabe; Matthias Adamczewski	G 277	DNF	86.0	25	31.0	22	28.0	DNC	86.0	231.0
48	HUN	P. Majoross	T. lzsak T. Farkas	M 24	DNS	86.0	60	66.0	15	21.0	53	59.0	232.0
49	HUN	I. Munch	P. Haberl; P. Gonzy	M 111	DNS	86.0	60	66.0	15	21.0	53	59.0	232.0
50	FRG	J. Minarek	M. Romberg; T. Romberg	G 272	DNF	86.0	63	69.0	26	32.0	45	51.0	238.0
51	ITA	F. Stopani	D. Bonsignore; A. Ribolli	I 223	DNF	86.0	23	29.0	68	74.0	46	52.0	241.0
52	FRG	Vincent Hösch	D. Stadler; R. Stark	G 259	DNF	86.0	40	46.0	19	25.0	DNC	86.0	243.0
53	SUI	Daniel Schenker	Christoph Schenker; H. Jasli	Z 271	20	26.0	68	74.0	54	60.0	DNC	86.0	246.0
54	HUN	F. Bartha	L. Szilasi; C. Erenyi	M 23	DNC	86.0	53	59.0	36	42.0	55	61.0	248.0
55	POR	Antonio Tanger	T. Otton; T. Tarsczy	P 9	DNS	86.0	49	55.0	56	62.0	41	47.0	250.0
56	NED	Rien Segaar	Jeroen Hopman; Arne Dolle	H 20	DNF	86.0	47	53.0	58	64.0	50	56.0	259.0
57	HUN	I. Petro	A. Boza; I. Frank	M 12	DNF	86.0	44	50.0	64	70.0	51	57.0	263.0
58	SUI	C. Grimm	F. Grimm; M. Vauthey	Z 258	DNC	86.0	20	26.0	61	67.0	DNC	86.0	265.0
59	FRG	Mathias Dulce	R. Stussel; N. Brinkmann	G 223	DNF	86.0	50	56.0	55	61.0	57	63.0	266.0
60	FRG	Andy Vincon	P. Dorsch; E. Meier	G 280	DNF	86.0	27	33.0	60	66.0	DNC	86.0	271.0
61	AUT	Carl Auteried Jr.	F. Neufing; T. Beclin	OE 97	DNF	86.0	24	30.0	66	72.0	DNC	86.0	274.0
62	NOR	Rune Jacobsen	Pai Christoffersen; Anders Andersen	N 104	DNF	86.0	58	64.0	38	44.0	DNC	86.0	280.0
63	AUT	P. Menzel	E. Hufnagel; M. Rubelmann	OE 51	DNF	86.0	55	61.0	76	82.0	52	58.0	287.0
64	SWE	P. Nilsson	L. Persson; F. Franssen	S 121	DNF	86.0	54	60.0	53	59.0	DNC	86.0	291.0
65	AUT	F. Wageneder	R. Fodinger; L. Raudaschl	OE 36	DNF	86.0	75	81.0	73	79.0	40	46.0	292.0
66	LIE	C. Seemann	J. Hartenstein; Nikki Seeman	FL 2	DNF	86.0	42	48.0	69	75.0	DNC	86.0	295.0
67	FRG	G. Baumuller	A. Schorr. Louis	G 252	DNF	86.0	66	72.0	46	52.0	DNC	86.0	296.0
68	FRG	Daniel Diesing	Thomas Maschkiwitz; C. Haake	G 271	DNF	86.0	PMS	86.0	35	41.0	DNC	86.0	299.0
69	ITA	F. D'Adda	G. D'Adda; G. Chiandussi	I 210	DNF	86.0	67	73.0	72	78.0	56	62.0	299.0
70	AUT	Christian Spiessberger	T. Linoriner; P. Burian	OE 78	DNF	86.0	69	75.0	48	54.0	DNC	86.0	301.0
71	FRG	T. Beck	H. Meier; G. Berz	G 212	DNF	86.0	56	62.0	65	71.0	DNC	86.0	305.0
72	FRG	U. Fernholz	M. Leukel; Mathias Heitmann	G 226	DNF	86.0	71	77.0	51	57.0	DNC	86.0	306.0
73	FRG	Axel Mertens	Michael Dümchen; A. Schulz	G 276	PMS	86.0	65	71.0	59	65.0	DNC	86.0	308.0
74	ITA	G. Beneditti	S. Marass; G. Fras	I 163	DNF	86.0	64	70.0	62	68.0	DNC	71.0	310.0
75	ITA	G. Veronesi	V. Gianluca; A. Aloisi	I 187	DNF	86.0	73	79.0	63	69.0	DNC	86.0	320.0
76	YUG	Bostjan Antoncic	O. Orel; Marco Kocjancic	Y 1	DNF	86.0	61	67.0	77	83.0	DNC	86.0	322.0
77	FRG	A. Forschner	C. Moosman; R. Teufel	G 234	DNF	86.0	72	78.0	70	76.0	DNC	86.0	326.0
78	FRG	M. Schulze	A. Fine; M. Bonness	G 245	DNS	86.0	74	80.0	79	85.0	DNC	86.0	337.0
79	ITA	A. Burlinna	L. Primosi; P. Simoniti	I 225	DNF	86.0	DSQ	86.0	75	81.0	DNC	86.0	339.0

Legend: DNF – Did not finish; DNS – Did not start; DSQ – Disqualified; PMS – Premature start; RET – Retired;
Discard is crossed out and does not count for the overall result.

- 1989 Progress

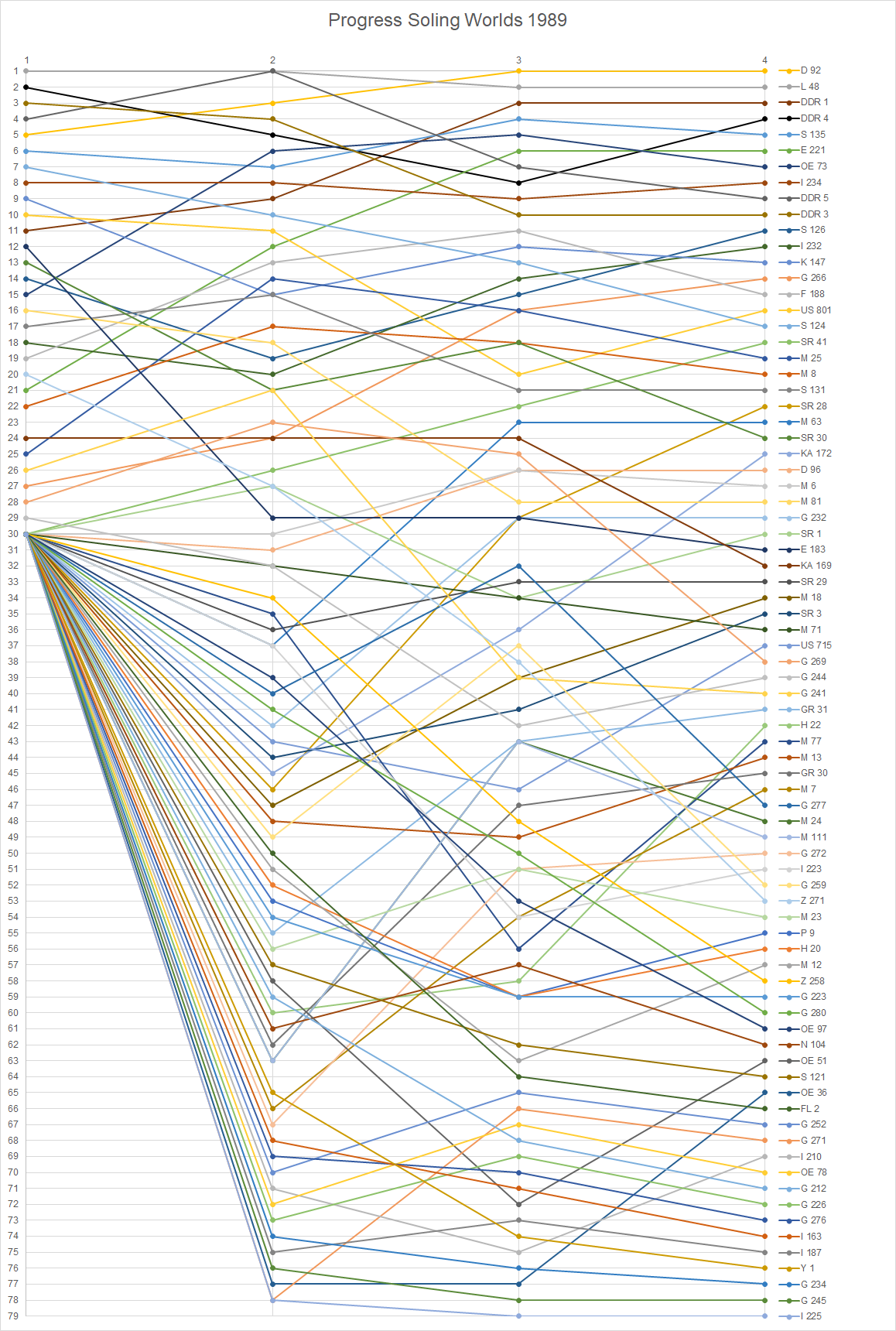

== Further results ==
For further results see:

- Soling World Championship results (1969–1979)
- Soling World Championship results (1980–1984)
- Soling World Championship results (1985–1989)
- Soling World Championship results (1990–1994)
- Soling World Championship results (1995–1999)
- Soling World Championship results (2000–2009)
- Soling World Championship results (2010–2019)
- Soling World Championship results (2020–2029)
