= Jens-Peter Wrede =

Olympic sailor from West-Germany

Personal information
- Nationality: West Germany
- Born: 19 April 1957 (age 68) Hamburg
- Height: 1.78 m (5.8 ft)

Sport

Sailing career
- Class: Soling
- Club: Segel-Verein Wedel-Schulau
- Updated on 28 February 2020

Jens-Peter Wrede (born 19 April 1957) is a sailor from Hamburg, West-Germany, who represented his country at the 1988 Summer Olympics in Busan, South Korea as helmsman in the Soling. With crew members Stefan Knabe and Matthias Adamczewski they took the 15th place.
