= Stefan Knabe =

Olympic sailor from West Germany (born 1963)

Personal information
- Nationality: West Germany
- Born: 27 December 1963 (age 62) Hamburg
- Height: 1.98 m (6.5 ft)

Sailing career
- Sport: Sailing
- Club: Segel-Verein Wedel-Schulau
- Class: Soling
- Updated on 28 February 2020

Stefan Knabe (born 27 December 1963) is a sailor from Hamburg, Germany, who represented his country at the 1988 Summer Olympics in Busan, South Korea as crew member in the Soling. With helmsman Jens-Peter Wrede and fellow crew members Matthias Adamczewski, they placed 15th.
