= Tadashi Ikeda =

Olympic sailor from Japan

Personal information
- Native name: 池田 正
- Nationality: Japan
- Born: 26 August 1955 (age 70)

Sport

Sailing career
- Class: Soling
- Updated on 28 February 2020

Tadashi Ikeda (born 11 February 1949) is a sailor from Japan. who represented his country at the 1988 Summer Olympics in Busan, South Korea as crew member in the Soling. With helmsman Kazunori Komatsu and fellow crew members Kazuo Hanaoka they took the 11th place.
