= Stuart Flinn =

Canadian sailor (born 1964)

Personal information
- Full name: Robert Stuart Flinn
- Nationality: Canada
- Born: 24 August 1964 (age 62) Halifax, Nova Scotia
- Height: 1.87 m (6.1 ft)

Sailing career
- Sport: Sailing
- Club: Royal Nova Scotia Yacht Squadron
- Class: Soling
- Updated on 28 February 2020

Stuart Flinn (born 24 August 1964) is a Canadian sailor from Halifax, Nova Scotia. who represented his country at the 1988 Summer Olympics in Busan, South Korea as crew member in the Soling. With helmsman Paul Thomson and fellow crew members Philip Gow they took the 12th place. The same team competed in the 1992 Summer Olympics in Barcelona, Spain were they took the 7th place.
