= Kazuo Hanaoka =

Olympic sailor from Japan

Personal information
- Native name: 花岡 一夫
- Nationality: Japan
- Born: 11 February 1949 (age 76)
- Height: 1.85 m (6.1 ft)

Sport

Sailing career
- Class: Soling
- Updated on 28 February 2020

Kazuo Hanaoka (born 11 February 1949) is a sailor from Japan. who represented his country at the 1988 Summer Olympics in Busan, South Korea as crew member in the Soling. With helmsman Kazunori Komatsu and fellow crew members Tadashi Ikeda they took the 11th place.
