= Philip Gow =

Olympic sailor from Canada

Personal information
- Full name: Philip K. Gow
- Nationality: Canada
- Born: 26 January 1962 (age 64) Halifax, Nova Scotia, Canada
- Height: 1.96 m (6.4 ft)

Sailing career
- Sport: Sailing
- Club: Royal Nova Scotia Yacht Squadron
- Class: Soling
- Updated on 28 February 2020

Philip Gow (born 26 January 1962) is a Canadian sailor from Halifax, Nova Scotia. who represented his country at the 1988 Summer Olympics in Busan, South Korea as crew member in the Soling. With helmsman Paul Thomson and fellow crew members Stuart Flinn they took the 12th place. The same team competed in the 1992 Summer Olympics in Barcelona, Spain were they took the 7th place.
