= Paul Thomson (sailor) =

Olympic sailor from Canada

Personal information
- Full name: Robert Paul Thomson
- Nationality: Canada
- Born: 10 April 1963 Iserlohn, West Germany
- Died: 1994 (age 31) Toronto
- Height: 1.87 m (6.1 ft)

Sailing career
- Sport: Sailing
- Club: Royal Nova Scotia Yacht Squadron
- Class: Soling
- Updated on 28 February 2020

Paul Thomson (born: 10 April 1963 Iserlohn, West-Germany, died: 1994 Toronto) was a sailor from Canada, who represented his country at the 1988 Summer Olympics in Busan, South Korea as helmsman in the Soling. With crew members Stuart Flinn and Philip Gow they took the 12th place. The same team competed in the 1992 Summer Olympics in Barcelona, Spain were they took the 7th place.
