= Matthias Adamczewski =

German sailor (born 1958)

Personal information
- Nationality: German
- Born: 31 March 1958 (age 68) Kiel, Germany
- Height: 1.87 m (6 ft 2 in)
- Weight: 77 kg (170 lb)

Sport
- Sport: Sailing

Matthias Adamczewski (born 31 March 1958) is a German sailor. He competed in the 1988 Summer Olympics.
