= Santana =

Santana may refer to:

== Music ==
- Carlos Santana, a Mexican-American guitarist
- Santana (band), rock band founded by guitarist Carlos Santana
  - Santana (1969 album), the debut album of the band
  - Santana (1971 album), third album of the band
  - Santana IV, 2016, album of the band's classic lineup
  - Santana Tour, 1969–1970, tour of the band
- Saucy Santana (Rashad Jamiyl Spain; born 1993), American rapper sometimes simply referred to as Santana

== Film and television ==
- Santana Productions, a film production company founded by Humphrey Bogart
- Santana Lopez, a fictional character on the TV series Glee
- Santana (film), a 2020 action film

== Transportation ==
- Volkswagen Santana, an automobile
- Santana Cycles, an American manufacturer of tandem bicycles
- Santana Motors, a former Spanish automobile manufacturer
- Sailboat designs by W. D. Schock Corp
  - Santana 20
  - Santana 21
  - Santana 22
  - Santana 23
  - Santana 25
  - Santana 27
  - Santana 30/30
  - Santana 37
  - Santana 39
  - Santana 2023

== People ==
- Santana (chief) (c. 1810–1876), chief of the Northern Mescalero Apache from 1857 to 1876
- Santana (footballer) (Joaquim Santana Silva Guimarães, 1936–1989), Portuguese international footballer
- Santana Garrett (born 1988), American professional wrestler
- Santana Hopper (born 2004), American football player
- Santana Martinez, a Native American artist, daughter-in-law and collaborator of Maria Martinez
- Santana Moss (born 1979), American wide receiver
- Santana (surname), a list of people with the surname
  - Carlos Santana (born 1947), Mexican-American guitarist
  - Oscar Santana (singer) (born 1941), Spanish singer
  - Saucy Santana (Rashad Spain, born 1993), American rapper
- Mike Draztik, ring name Santana, a professional wrestler and a member of tag team Santana and Ortiz

== Places ==
=== Brazil ===
- Santana (district of São Paulo), a neighborhood of São Paulo
- Santana (São Paulo Metro), a station on the São Paulo Metro
- Santana, Rio Grande do Sul, neighbourhood in the city of Porto Alegre
- Santana, Amapá
- Santana, Bahia
- Barra de Santana, Paraíba
- Tacima, formerly Campo de Santana, Paraíba
- Capela de Santana, Rio Grande do Sul
- Feira de Santana, Bahia
- Riacho de Santana, Bahia
- Riacho de Santana, Rio Grande do Norte
- Santana do Acaraú, Ceará
- Santana do Araguaia, Pará
- Santana da Boa Vista, Rio Grande do Sul
- Santana do Cariri, Ceará
- Santana de Cataguases, Minas Gerais
- Santana do Deserto, Minas Gerais
- Santana do Garambéu, Minas Gerais
- Santana dos Garrotes, Paraíba
- Santana do Ipanema, Alagoas
- Santana do Itararé, Paraná
- Santana do Jacaré, Minas Gerais
- Santana do Livramento, Rio Grande do Sul
- Santana de Mangueira, Paraíba
- Santana do Manhuaçu, Minas Gerais
- Santana do Maranhão, Maranhão
- Santana do Matos, Rio Grande do Norte
- Santana dos Montes, Minas Gerais
- Santana do Mundaú, Alagoas
- Santana do Paraíso, Rio Grande do Sul
- Santana de Parnaíba, São Paulo
- Santana do Piauí, Piauí
- Santana de Pirapama, Minas Gerais
- Santana da Ponte Pensa, São Paulo
- Santana do Riacho, Minas Gerais
- Santana do São Francisco, Sergipe
- Santana do Seridó, Rio Grande do Norte
- Santana da Vargem, Minas Gerais
- Santana Indigenous Territory, Mato Grosso
- Sertão Santana, Rio Grande do Sul

=== Dominican Republic ===
- Ramón Santana, San Pedro de Macorís, municipality in the San Pedro de Macorís Province
- Santana, Baoruco, a municipal district in the Baoruco Province
- Santana, Peravia, Dominican Republic, a municipal district in the Peravia Province

=== Portugal ===
- Santana (Figueira da Foz), a civil parish in the municipality of Figueira da Foz
- Santana (Nisa), a civil parish in the municipality of Nisa
- Santana (Nordeste), a parish in the municipality of Nordeste in the Azores
- Santana (Portel), a parish in the municipality of Portel
- Santana, Madeira, a municipality on the island of Madeira
- Santana (Sesimbra), a village in the municipality of Sesimbra in Setúbal district, Portugal.

=== Puerto Rico ===
- Santana, Arecibo, Puerto Rico, a barrio
- Santana, Sabana Grande, Puerto Rico, a barrio

=== Romania ===
- Sântana, a town in Arad County, Romania
- Sântana de Mureș, a commune in Mureș County, Romania

=== Elsewhere ===
- Santana, Boyacá, municipality in the Boyacá Department
- Santana, São Tomé and Príncipe, town in the eastern coast of São Tomé Island
- Santana, Belize, village in the Belize District

== Sports ==
- Santana Esporte Clube, a Brazilian football (soccer) club
- Santana FC, a football club in São Tomé and Príncipe

== Other uses ==
- Santana Formation, fossil accumulation in northeastern Brazil's Araripe Basin
- Santana High School, a secondary school in Santee, California
  - Santana High School shooting, a 2001 shooting at the California high school
- Santana, a fictional character in the story arc Battle Tendency from JoJo's Bizarre Adventure

== See also ==
- Satanta
- Setanta (disambiguation)
- Santa Ana (disambiguation)
- Santan (disambiguation)
- Santhana (disambiguation)
- Santhanam (disambiguation)
