= Schock 23 =

1980s US recreational keelboat

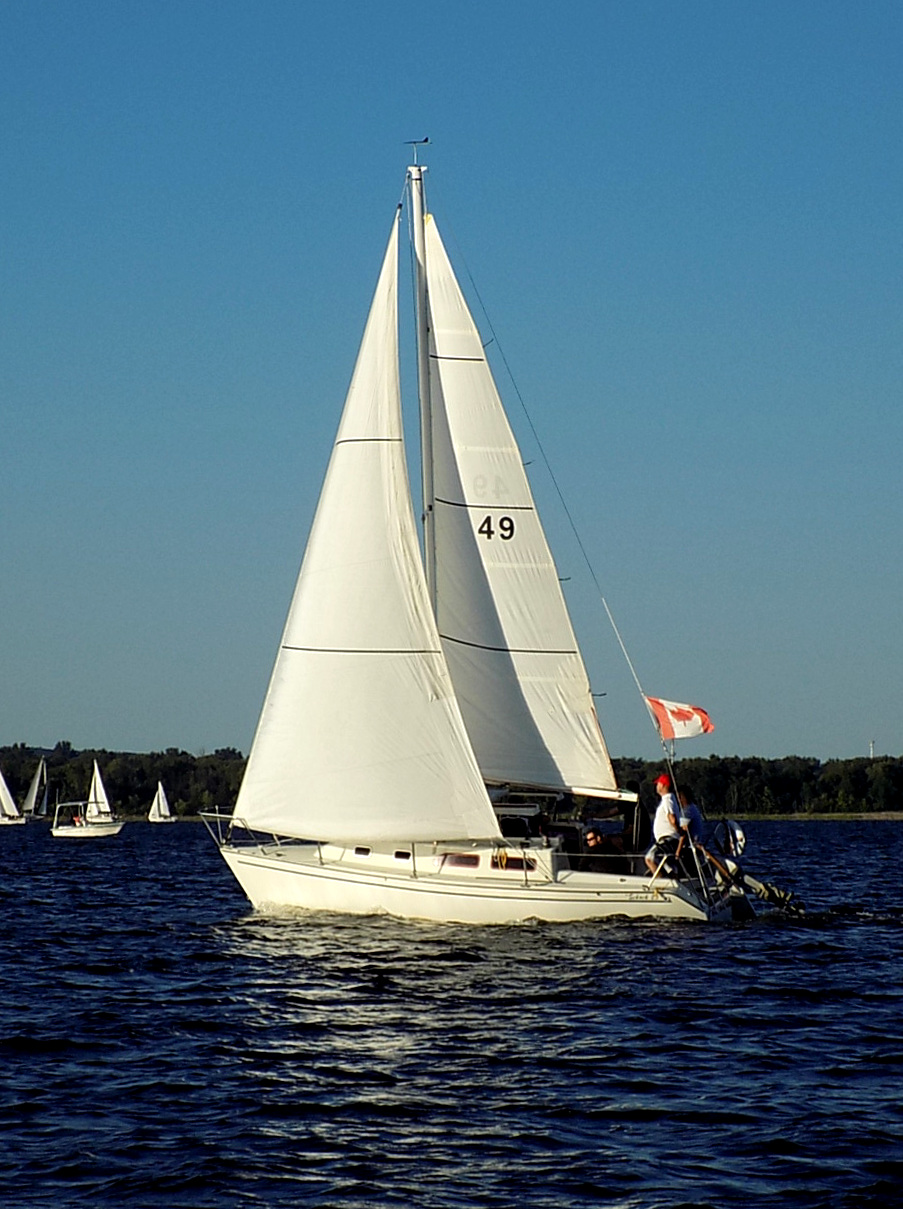

Development
- Designer: Steven Schock
- Location: United States
- Year: 1987
- Builder: W. D. Schock Corp
- Name: Schock 23

Boat
- Displacement: 2,800 lb (1,270 kg)
- Draft: 2.92 ft (0.89 m)

Hull
- Type: Monohull
- Construction: Fiberglass
- LOA: 23.33 ft (7.11 m)
- LWL: 20.67 ft (6.30 m)
- Beam: 8.50 ft (2.59 m)
- Engine: Outboard motor

Hull appendages
- Keel: wing keel
- Ballast: 1,100 lb (499 kg)
- Rudder: transom-mounted rudder

Rig
- General: Masthead sloop
- I foretriangle height: 29.50 ft (8.99 m)
- J foretriangle base: 10.00 ft (3.05 m)
- P mainsail luff: 26.50 ft (8.08 m)
- E mainsail foot: 9.00 ft (2.74 m)

Sails
- Mainsail area: 119.25 sq ft (11.079 m^{2})
- Jib/genoa area: 147.50 sq ft (13.703 m^{2})
- Total sail area: 266.75 sq ft (24.782 m^{2})

Racing
- PHRF: 201 (average)

The Schock 23 is a recreational keelboat, with a wing keel designed by Finnish engineer Reijo Salminen. It was built by W. D. Schock Corp in Corona, California, United States, but it is now out of production. W. D. Schock Corp records indicate that they built 52 boats between 1987 and 1991.

== Design ==
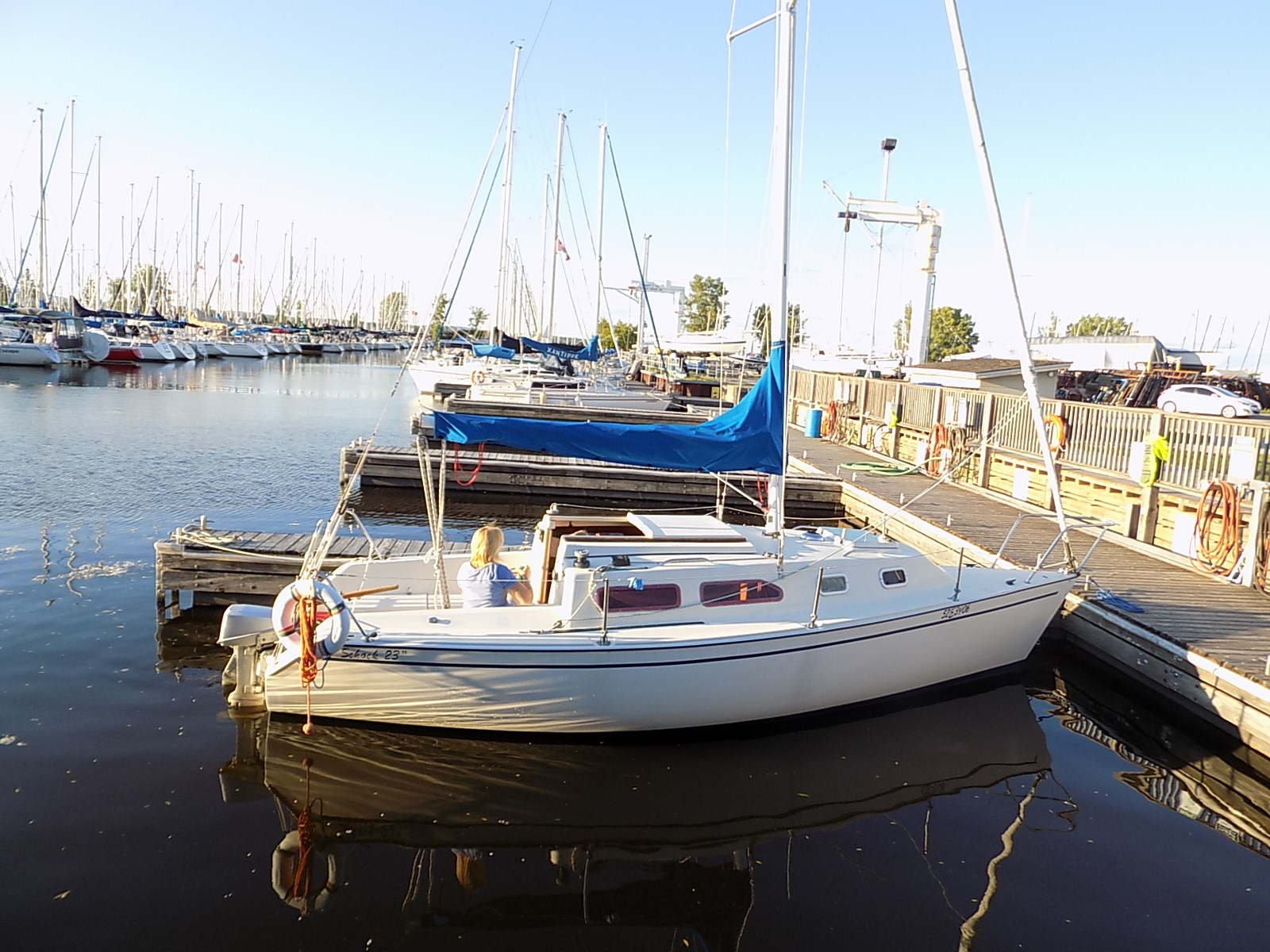
Schock 23

The Schock 23 is built predominantly of fiberglass, with wood trim. It has a masthead sloop rig, a transom-hung rudder and a fixed wing keel. It displaces 2,800 lb (1,270 kg) and carries 1,100 lb (499 kg) of ballast. It has a draft of 2.92 ft (0.89 m) with the standard wing keel.

The boat is normally fitted with a small 3 to 6 hp (2 to 4 kW) outboard motor for docking and maneuvering.

The design has sleeping accommodation for four people, with a double "V"-berth in the bow cabin, one straight settee in the main cabin and one quarter berth aft under the companionway. The galley is located on the port side just forward of the companionway ladder. The galley is equipped with a single-burner stove and a sink. The head is located just aft of the bow cabin. Cabin headroom is 54 in (137 cm).

The boat has a PHRF racing average handicap of 201 with a high of 210 and low of 177. It has a hull speed of 6.09 kn (11.28 km/h).

== Reception ==
In a 2010 review Steve Henkel wrote, "the Schock 23 is the predecessor to Schock's Santana 2023, in which some components such as the stern configuration have been preserved (and are very similar to the stern on the Santana 23, designed for Schock in the late 1970s by Shad Turner) ... Best features: The cockpit has deep, well-angled, comfortable backrests. Opening Lewmar ports give good ventilation, and an optional poptop increases headroom in the main cabin to 5' 11". The Schock is fitted with a bolt-on winged keel designed by Finnish engineer Reijo Salminen. Sailing a Schock 25 with a standard deep fin keel against an identical hull fitted with the shallower winged keel, the Schocks found that light-air windward performance was about equal and the winged keel had the edge reaching and running. In heavier winds, the winged keel proved more effective than the standard fin on all points of sail. Worst features: Wings on a keel can pick up weed and jetsam, slowing the boat down."
