= Santanta =

Santanta may be an alternate spelling of:

- Santana (disambiguation)
- Setanta (disambiguation)
- Satanta
