= Schock 34 =

Schock 34 may refer to:

- Schock 34 GP, racing sailboat
- Schock 34 PC, cruising sailboat
