= Schock 55 =

Sailboat class

Development
- Designer: Bruce Marek
- Location: United States
- Year: 1990
- No. built: 4
- Builders: Geraghty Marine; W. D. Schock Corp
- Role: Racer
- Name: Schock 55

Boat
- Displacement: 18,500 lb (8,391 kg)
- Draft: 10.00 ft (3.05 m)

Hull
- Type: monohull
- Construction: fiberglass
- LOA: 55.00 ft (16.76 m)
- LWL: 44.00 ft (13.41 m)
- Beam: 12.50 ft (3.81 m)
- Engine: inboard motor

Hull appendages
- Keel: fin keel
- Ballast: 8,300 lb (3,765 kg)
- Rudder: internally-mounted spade-type rudder

Rig
- Rig type: Bermuda rig
- I foretriangle height: 63.00 ft (19.20 m)
- J foretriangle base: 19.50 ft (5.94 m)
- P mainsail luff: 56.00 ft (17.07 m)
- E mainsail foot: 21.75 ft (6.63 m)

Sails
- Sailplan: fractional rigged sloop masthead sloop
- Mainsail area: 609.00 sq ft (56.578 m^{2})
- Jib/genoa area: 614.25 sq ft (57.066 m^{2})
- Total sail area: 1,223.25 sq ft (113.644 m^{2})

The Schock 55, also called the Nelson Marek 55, is an American sailboat that was designed by Bruce Marek of the design firm Nelson Marek, as a racer and first built in 1990.

== Production ==
The design was initially built by Geraghty Marine, who built two boats as the Nelson Marek 55, and then by W. D. Schock Corp, who acquired the molds and also built two boats as the Schock 55, with production running from 1990 to 1991.

== Design ==
The Schock 55 is a racing keelboat, built predominantly of fiberglass, with wood trim. It has a masthead sloop rig, a raked stem, a sharply reverse transom, an internally mounted spade-type rudder controlled by a wheel and a fixed fin keel. It displaces 18,500 lb (8,391 kg) and carries 8,300 lb (3,765 kg) of ballast.

The boat has a draft of 10.00 ft (3.05 m) with the standard keel.

The design has a hull speed of 8.89 kn (16.46 km/h).

== Operational history ==
In a 1991 review in Cruising World by Quentin Warren wrote, "long and lean, carrying a deep keel and a tall rig, the new 55-foot ULDB offered this year by the W.D. Schock Corporation is a striking Bruce Marek design with serious racing potential and a one-design slant."

== See also ==
- List of sailing boat types
