= Wavelength 35 =

Sailboat class

Development
- Designer: Paul Lindenberg
- Location: United States
- Year: 1983
- Builder: W. D. Schock Corp
- Role: Racer-Cruiser
- Name: Wavelength 35

Boat
- Displacement: 9,000 lb (4,082 kg)
- Draft: 6.70 ft (2.04 m)

Hull
- Type: monohull
- Construction: fiberglass
- LOA: 35.00 ft (10.67 m)
- LWL: 28.00 ft (8.53 m)
- Beam: 10.70 ft (3.26 m)

Hull appendages
- Keel: fin keel
- Rudder: internally-mounted spade-type rudder

Rig
- Rig type: Bermuda rig
- I foretriangle height: 49.00 ft (14.94 m)
- J foretriangle base: 13.80 ft (4.21 m)
- P mainsail luff: 44.00 ft (13.41 m)
- E mainsail foot: 13.80 ft (4.21 m)

Sails
- Sailplan: masthead sloop
- Mainsail area: 303.60 sq ft (28.205 m^{2})
- Jib/genoa area: 338.10 sq ft (31.411 m^{2})
- Total sail area: 641.70 sq ft (59.616 m^{2})

The Wavelength 35 is an American sailboat that was designed by Paul Lindenberg as a racer-cruiser and first built in 1980.

The Wavelength series of boats is named for the prototype Lindenberg 30 which was a boat named Wavelength.

== Production ==
The design was built by W. D. Schock Corp in the United States starting in 1983, but it is now out of production.

== Design ==
The Wavelength 35 is a racing keelboat, built predominantly of fiberglass, with wood trim. It has a masthead sloop rig, an internally mounted spade-type rudder and a fixed fin keel. It displaces 9,000 lb (4,082 kg).

The boat has a draft of 6.70 ft (2.04 m) and a hull speed of 7.09 kn (13.13 km/h).

== See also ==
- List of sailing boat types
