= Hobie 17 World Championship =

Hobie 17 Catamaran Worlds

The Hobie 17 World Championships was an international sailing regatta for Hobie 17. The event was organized by the host club on behalf of the International Hobie Class Association and recognized by World Sailing, the sports IOC recognized governing body.

== Editions ==
Event			Host			Sailors			Ref.
Ed.	Date	Year	Host club	Location	Nat.	No.	Nat.	Cont.	Ref.
1	3-10 Sept	1988		Kaanapali Beach, Maui, Hawaii	United States	72			
2	9-16 June	1990	Etobicoke Yacht Club	Toronto	Canada	36			
3	26-29 June	1996	Club Nautic de Sitges	Sitges	Spain	28			
4		1999		Melbourne	Australia	25			
5		2005	Port Melbourne Yacht Club	Melbourne	Australia	16			

== Edition ==
Year	Gold	Silver	Bronze
1988	Mike Metcalf (AUS)	Chris Metcalf (AUS)	Carlton Tucker (USA)
1990	Bob Seaman (USA)	Carlton Tucker (USA)	Bruce Bechtold (FRG)
1996	Bruce Bechtold (GER)	Luis Fernández (ESP)	Detlef Peters (GER)
1999	Steve Fields (AUS)	Daniel Kulkoski (USA)	Jeffrey Newsome (USA)
2005	Aaron Worrall (AUS)	Daniel Kulkoski (USA)	Greg Raybon (USA)
