= Campo de Santana =

Campo de Santana may refer to:

- Tacima, formerly Campo de Santana, a municipality in Paraíba, Brazi
- Campo de Santana (park), Rio de Janeiro, Brazil
