= 2007–08 All-Ireland Junior Club Hurling Championship =

Fifth All-Ireland Junior Club Hurling Championship

All Ireland Champions
- Winners: Conahy Shamrocks (1st win)
- Captain: Eoin Murphy

All Ireland Runners-up
- Runners-up: Moyle Rovers
- Captain: Noel Wall

Provincial Champions
- Munster: Moyle Rovers
- Leinster: Conahy Shamrocks
- Ulster: Glen Rovers, Armoy
- Connacht: Sylane

The 2007–08 All-Ireland Junior Club Hurling Championship was the fifth staging of the All-Ireland Junior Club Hurling Championship since its establishment by the Gaelic Athletic Association.

The All-Ireland final was played on 9 February 2008 at Croke Park in Dublin, between Conahy Shamrocks from Kilkenny and Moyle Rovers from Tipperary, in what was their first ever meeting in the final. Conahy Shamrocks won the match by 0-19 to 1-09 to claim their first ever All-Ireland title.

== Connacht Junior Club Hurling Championship ==
=== Connacht final ===
17 November 2007 First round	Athleague	1-05 - 0-12	Sylane	Athleague Sportsfield

== Leinster Junior Club Hurling Championship ==
=== Leinster first round ===
21 October 2007 First round	Arklow Rock Parnells	1-13 - 0-11	Wolfe Tones	Parnell Park

21 October 2007 First round	Abbeyleix	3-11 - 1-02	Kildavin

21 October 2007 First round	Moorefield	0-08 - 5-17	Castlepollard	Moorefield Grounds

=== Leinster quarter-finals ===
4 November 2007 Quarter-final	Arklow Rock Parnells	0-08 - 4-24	Conahy Shamrocks	Parnell Park

4 November 2007 Quarter-final	Castlepollard	2-13 - 1-05	Davidstown/Courtnacuddy	Castlepollard Grounds

4 November 2007 Quarter-final	Abbeyleix	0-12 - 1-13	Ballinamere	Fr Breen Park

8 November 2007 Quarter-final	Raheny	2-10 - 0-10	Knockbridge	Páirc Naomh Uinsionn

=== Leinster semi-finals ===
17 November 2007 Semi-final	Raheny	0-04 - 1-10	Conahy Shamrocks	St Anne's Park
	C Henry 0-2, G Bennett 0-1.		K Mooney 1-5, D Buggy 0-2, P Nolan 0-1, M Lawler 0-1, A Healy 0-1.

18 November 2007 Semi-final	Ballinamere	1-18 - 6-15 (aet)	Castlepollard	Ballinamere Grounds
	M Óg Buggy 0-8, E Molloy 0-4, D Wyer 1-0, S Wyer 0-2, N Minnock 0-2, P Kinnarney 0-1, K Wyer 0-1.		S McLoughli 2-0, JP Murray 1-1, K Gavigan 1-1, Alan Devine 1-1, Alfie Devine 0-4, B Kennedy 0-4, B Melia 1-0, K Brazil 0-1, D McCormack 0-1, S Bardon 0-1, A Smith 0-1.

=== Leinster final ===
1 December 2007 Final	Conahy Shamrocks	3-10 - 1-04	Castlepollard	Clonkill Grounds
	K Mooney 1-5, A Healy 2-1, D Buggy 0-2, M Lawlor 0-1, G Nolan 0-1.		A Devine 1-1, JP Murray 0-2, A Devine 0-1.

== Munster Junior Club Hurling Championship ==
=== Munster quarter-finals ===
18 November 2007 Quarter-final	Meelick	0-05 - 2-14	Barryroe	Meelick Grounds
	C Dolan 0-2, K Keane 0-1, B Dolan 0-1, E Mulvihill 0-1.		K Griffin 0-6, D Harrington 1-1, C Hurley 1-0, K McCarthy 0-2, A Fleming 0-2, J O'Donovan 0-1, A White 0-1, G Coleman 0-1.

18 November 2007 Quarter-final	Kilgarvan	2-11 - 2-09	Caherline	Fr. Breen Park
	M Foley 1-9, P Healy 1-0, G Egan 0-2.		P Mulready 1-2, B Hourigan 1-2, D O'Loughlin 0-3, J Hourigan 0-1, G Murphy 0-1.

=== Munster semi-finals ===
25 November 2007 Semi-final	Barryroe	2-13 - 2-07	Ballysaggart	Páirc Uí Chaoimh
	K Griffin 0-9, D Harrington 2-1, K Hirley 0-2, P Collins 0-1.		R Walsh 2-0, C Murphy 0-5, T Landers 0-1, E O'Brien 0-1.	Referee: D O'Driscoll (Limerick)

25 November 2007 Semi-final	Moyle Rovers	2-17 - 4-05	Kilgarvan	Ardfinnan Grounds
	D Browne 0-8, S Carey 1-1, P Johnson 1-1, P Acheson 0-3, B Mulvihill 0-2, B Whelan 0-1, M Dunne 0-1.		F O'Brien 2-0, D O'Sullivan 1-1, P Healy 1-0, M Foley 0-3, K Harrington 0-1.	Referee: C Lyons (Cork)

=== Munster final ===
16 December 2007 Final	Barryroe	0-09 - 3-10	Moyle Rovers	Páirc Mac Gearailt
	K Griffin (0-5, 0-4 frees), P Collins (0-2), T Harrington, K. McCarthy (0-1 each).	Report	B Whelan (2-1), P Acheson (1-0), D Browne (0-5, 0-2 frees), M Dunne (0-2), S Carey (0-2).	Referee: D O'Driscoll (Limerick)

== Ulster Junior Club Hurling Championship ==
=== Ulster semi-finals ===
21 October 2007 Semi-final	Bredagh	0-12 - 2-06	Setanta	Watty Graham Park
	I Galway 0-6, F McCamphill 0-2, S McLoughney 0-1, A McAllister 0-1, C Hughes 0-1, E Donnelly 0-1.		K Nolan 1-1, M Callaghan 1-0, K Campbell 0-2, M Lafferty 0-1, D Browne 0-1, G Dwyer 0-1.

28 October 2007 Semi-final replay	Bredagh	1-05 - 0-12	Setanta	Watty Graham Park
	E Donnelly 1-0, I Galway 0-2, A McAllister 0-1, S McLoughney 0-1, C Hughes 0-1.		D Cullen 0-4, K Nolan 0-3, D Browne 0-3, B McGranaghan 0-1, W Scanlon 0-1.

=== Ulster final ===
4 November 2007 Final	Glen Rovers, Armoy	1-09 - 0-11	Setanta	Casement Park
	D McToal 1-1, G McFetridge 0-2, L Forsythe 0-2, C McCormick 0-1, F McBride 0-1, M McErlain 0-1, P McFetridge 0-1.		K Campbell 0-8, M Lafferty 0-1, D Browne 0-1, M Bonner 0-1.

== All-Ireland Junior Club Hurling Championship ==
=== All-Ireland quarter-final ===
20 January 2008 Quarter-final	Glen Rovers, Armoy	1-10 - 1-06	John Mitchel's	Musgrave Park
	S McBride 1-2, L Forsythe 0-4, J Dillon 0-1, V Forsythe 0-1, G McFetridge 0-1, M McErlain 0-1.		M Lyons 0-4, S Aherne 1-0, T Joyce 0-1, W Healy 0-1.	Referee: T Mahon (Fermanagh)

=== All-Ireland semi-finals ===
27 January 2008 Semi-final	Moyle Rovers	4-18 - 1-08	Sylane	O'Moore Park
	D Browne 1-6, P Johnson 2-2, B Mulvihill 1-2, E Whelan 0-3, S Carey 0-2, B Whelan 0-1, M Dunne 0-1, J Williams 0-1.		T Costello 0-4, S Brady 1-0, J Killeen 0-2, J Canney 0-1, S Glynn 0-1.

27 January 2008 Semi-final	Conahy Shamrocks	4-15 - 1-10	Glen Rovers, Armoy	Darver COE
	A Healy 3-1, G Nolan 1-4, K Mooney 0-4, M Lawlor 0-3, P Nolan 0-2, D Buggy 0-1.		L Forsythe 0-5, S McBride 1-0, M McErlain 0-3, J Dillon 0-1, G McFetridge 0-1.

=== All-Ireland final ===
9 February 2008 Final	Conahy Shamrocks	0–19 – 1–09	Moyle Rovers	Croke Park
	K Mooney 0–7 (6f), A Healy 0–3, P Nolan, M Lawlor, G Nolan 0–2 each, D Healy 0–1(1f), J Wallace, D Buggy 0–1 each.	Report	D Browne 1–6 (1-1f), D Lyne (f), S Carey, B Mulvihill 0–1 each.	Referee: P Green (Galway)
