= Harbor 30 =

Sailboat class

Development
- Designer: Steve Schock
- Location: United States
- Year: 2009
- Builder: W. D. Schock Corp
- Role: Daysailer; Cruiser

Boat
- Displacement: 7,500 lb (3,402 kg)
- Draft: 6.25 ft (1.91 m)

Hull
- Type: monohull
- Construction: fiberglass
- LOA: 30.75 ft (9.37 m)
- LWL: 26.12 ft (7.96 m)
- Beam: 9.92 ft (3.02 m)
- Engine: Yanmar 20 hp (15 kW) diesel engine

Hull appendages
- Keel: weighted bulb fin keel
- Ballast: 3,300 lb (1,497 kg)
- Rudder: internally-mounted spade-type rudder

Rig
- Rig type: Bermuda rig
- I foretriangle height: 39.25 ft (11.96 m)
- J foretriangle base: 12.12 ft (3.69 m)
- P mainsail luff: 40.50 ft (12.34 m)
- E mainsail foot: 14.10 ft (4.30 m)

Sails
- Sailplan: fractional rigged sloop
- Mainsail area: 285.53 sq ft (26.527 m^{2})
- Jib/genoa area: 237.86 sq ft (22.098 m^{2})
- Total sail area: 523.38 sq ft (48.624 m^{2})

Rating
- PHRF: 120

The Harbor 30 is an American sailboat that was designed by W. D. Schock Corp's Steve Schock as a daysailer and cruiser and first built in 2009.

The design was a nominee for Sailing World's Boat of the Year in 2013.

== Production ==
The design molds were built in 2009 by W. D. Schock Corp in the United States, although the first boat was not completed until 2012. It is now out of production.

== Design ==
The Harbor 30 is a recreational keelboat, built predominantly of fiberglass, with carbon fiber reinforcement and interior with varnished mahogany wood trim. The hull is solid, hand-laid fiberglass, while the deck is cored with end-grain balsa. The hull has a deck-stepped mast, a raked stem, an angled transom, an internally mounted spade-type rudder controlled by a wheel and a fixed fin keel with a weighted bulb. It has a 7/8 fractional sloop rig, with double spreaders. It displaces 7,500 lb (3,402 kg) and carries 3,300 lb (1,497 kg) of ballast. The hull has an aft lazarette with storage space and a drop-down swimming ladder.

The boat has a draft of 6.25 ft (1.91 m) with the standard keel and 4.42 ft (1.35 m) with the optional shoal draft keel, which was designed for US east coast cruising conditions.

The boat is fitted with a Japanese Yanmar diesel engine of 20 hp (15 kW), with a saildrive and a folding propeller for docking and maneuvering. The engine will propel the boat at 6.5 kn (12.0 km/h). The fuel tank holds 20 U.S. gallons (76 L; 17 imp gal) and the fresh water tank has a capacity of 36 U.S. gallons (140 L; 30 imp gal), while the holding tank has a capacity of 20 U.S. gallons (76 L; 17 imp gal).

The design has sleeping accommodation for four adults, with a double "V"-berth in the bow cabin and an aft cabin with a transversely-mounted double berth. There are also two straight settees in the main cabin. The galley is located on the starboard side at the companionway ladder. The galley is L-shaped and is equipped with a two-burner stove, ice box and a sink. The Jabsco head is located opposite the galley, on the port side and includes a shower. The cabin sole is holly and teak. Cabin headroom is 72 in (183 cm).

For sailing the boat has a self-tacking Hoyt jib boom with roller furling, plus lazy jacks on the mainsail boom to ease sail handling. The cockpit is 7.75 ft (2.36 m) long and has a built in ice box and cup holders. Stanchions and lifelines were factory options.

For sailing downwind the design may be equipped with an asymmetric spinnaker.

The design has a hull speed of 6.85 kn (12.69 km/h) and a PHRF racing average handicap of 120.

== Operational history ==
In a 2012 review of the prototype for boats.com, Zuzana Prochazka wrote, "she has exceptional sailing characteristics as well as a completely functional interior for cruising and extended weekending."

Herb McCormick wrote a 2012 Cruising World review, stating, "the Harbor 30 really struts its stuff once the sails are set. It was a light-air day on the Chesapeake when we put the boat through its paces, with the breeze never topping 10 knots. But the Harbor 30 acquitted itself well, scooting upwind at a solid 6 knots. Our test boat was laid out with the 4-foot-10-inch shoal-draft keel, and we reckoned there’d be a nice uptick in speed with the optional 6-foot-3-inch foil."

In its 2013 Boat of the Year nomination, Sailing World noted, "classic lines and easy sailing define the modern daysailer, and the Harbor 30 slots right into this genre. With a jib boom, wheel steering, full-bench seating in the cockpit, four berths below, and a comfortable interior, there are five reasons right there to race it, cruise it, and take all your friends for a sunset booze cruise."

== See also ==
- List of sailing boat types
