= Santana (surname) =

Santana is a surname of Spanish and Portuguese origin. The surname is prevalent in various Latin American countries. It is used by the following people:

== Athletes ==
- Dennis Santana (born 1996), pitcher in Major League Baseball
- Ervin Santana (born 1982), Major League Baseball Pitcher for the Minnesota Twins
- Johan Santana (born 1979), pitcher in Major League Baseball
- Manuel Santana (1938–2021), tennis player
- Rodrigão (Rodrigo Santana, born 1979), Brazilian volleyball player
- Tito Santana (born 1953), ring name of American professional wrestler Merced Solis

=== Football (soccer) players ===
- Cléber Santana (1981–2016), Brazilian footballer
- Fidelis Junior Santana da Silva (born 1981), Brazilian football midfielder
- Joaquim Santana Silva Guimarães (1936–1989), Portuguese football right half
- Joel Santana (born 1955), former football player and coach for the South African national football team
- Jonathan Santana (born 1981), naturalized Paraguayan football midfielder
- Mario Santana (born 1981), Argentine football midfielder
- Pedro Aparecido Santana (born 1973), Brazilian football striker
- Rodrigo Marques de Santana (born 1982), Brazilian football midfielder
- Suso Santana (born 1985), Spanish football winger
- Telê Santana (1931–2006), a Brazilian football player and manager
- Vanesa Santana (born 1990), Argentine football midfielder

== Entertainers ==
- Adria Santana (1948–2011), Cuban actress
- Carlos Santana (born 1947), Mexican-American guitarist
- Fredo Santana (Derrick Coleman, 1990–2018), American rapper
- Jorge Santana (1951–2020), musician and brother of Carlos Santana
- Juelz Santana (LaRon James Sr., born 1982), American rapper
- Lizé Santana (born 1980), American singer-songwriter
- Luan Santana (born 1991), Brazilian singer
- Oscar Santana (born 1941), Spanish singer
- Salvador Santana (born 1983), musician and son of Carlos Santana
- Saucy Santana (Rashad Spain, born 1993), American rapper

== Other ==
- Alencar Santana (born 1976), Brazilian politician
- Bianca Santana (born 1984), Brazilian writer, researcher, journalist and teacher
- Deborah Santana (née King; born 1951), American social justice activist and ex-wife of Carlos Santana
- Lara Santana (born 1993), Brazilian politician
- Pedro Santana (1801–1864), first President of the Dominican Republic

== See also ==
- Santana (disambiguation)
- Santa Ana (disambiguation)
