= Schock 35 =

Sailboat class

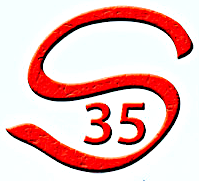

Development
- Designer: W. Shad Turner
- Location: United States
- Year: 1984
- No. built: 83
- Builder: W. D. Schock Corp
- Role: Racer-Cruiser
- Name: Schock 35

Boat
- Displacement: 10,000 lb (4,536 kg)
- Draft: 6.75 ft (2.06 m)

Hull
- Type: monohull
- Construction: fiberglass
- LOA: 35.00 ft (10.67 m)
- LWL: 29.50 ft (8.99 m)
- Beam: 11.75 ft (3.58 m)
- Engine: Inboard motor

Hull appendages
- Keel: fin keel
- Ballast: 4,500 lb (2,041 kg)
- Rudder: internally-mounted spade-type rudder

Rig
- Rig type: Bermuda rig
- I foretriangle height: 49.00 ft (14.94 m)
- J foretriangle base: 13.75 ft (4.19 m)
- P mainsail luff: 44.00 ft (13.41 m)
- E mainsail foot: 13.75 ft (4.19 m)

Sails
- Sailplan: masthead sloop
- Mainsail area: 302.50 sq ft (28.103 m^{2})
- Jib/genoa area: 336.88 sq ft (31.297 m^{2})
- Total sail area: 639.38 sq ft (59.400 m^{2})

The Schock 35 is an American sailboat that was designed by W. Shad Turner as a racer-cruiser and first built in 1984.

The design is a development of the Santana 35, with a longer keel and higher mast.

== Production ==
The design was produced by W. D. Schock Corp in the United States, starting in 1982. An updated model remained in production until 2011, after which it was discontinued. A total of 83 boats were built.

== Design ==
The Schock 35 is a recreational keelboat, built predominantly of fiberglass, with wood trim. It has a masthead sloop rig, a raked stem, a reverse transom, an internally mounted spade-type rudder controlled by a tiller and a fixed fin keel or optional shoal-draft wing keel.

The design has sleeping accommodation for six people, with a double "V"-berth in the bow cabin, two straight settee berths in the main cabin and two quarter berths aft under the cockpit. The galley is located on the port side at the companionway ladder. The galley is equipped with a two-burner stove, ice box and a sink. A navigation station is opposite the galley, on the starboard side. The head is located in the bow cabin on the starboard side.

For sailing downwind the design may be equipped with a symmetrical spinnaker.

The design has a hull speed of 7.28 kn (13.48 km/h).

== Variants ==
Schock 35
This fin keel model was introduced in 1984. It displaces 10,000 lb (4,536 kg) and carries 4,500 lb (2,041 kg) of ballast. The boat has a draft of 6.75 ft (2.06 m) with the standard keel.
Schock 35 WK
This wing keel-equipped model was also introduced in 1984. It displaces 9,500 lb (4,309 kg) and carries 4,000 lb (1,814 kg) of ballast. The boat has a draft of 5.33 ft (1.62 m) with the shoal draft wing keel.

== Operational history ==
The boat was once is supported by a class club that organized racing events, the Schock 35 Class Association.

== See also ==
- List of sailing boat types

Related development

- Santana 35
