= Santana 26 =

1970s US recreational keelboat

Development
- Designer: Seymour Paul
- Location: United States
- Year: 1971
- No. built: 83
- Builder: W. D. Schock Corp
- Role: Cruiser

Boat
- Displacement: 5,060 lb (2,295 kg)
- Draft: 5.00 ft (1.52 m)

Hull
- Type: monohull
- Construction: fiberglass
- LOA: 26.17 ft (7.98 m)
- LWL: 21.08 ft (6.43 m)
- Beam: 7.92 ft (2.41 m)
- Engine: outboard motor

Hull appendages
- Keel: fin keel
- Ballast: 2,400 lb (1,089 kg)
- Rudder: internally-mounted spade-type rudder

Rig
- Rig type: Bermuda rig
- I foretriangle height: 33.60 ft (10.24 m)
- J foretriangle base: 11.66 ft (3.55 m)
- P mainsail luff: 28.00 ft (8.53 m)
- E mainsail foot: 10.00 ft (3.05 m)

Sails
- Sailplan: masthead sloop
- Mainsail area: 140.00 sq ft (13.006 m^{2})
- Jib/genoa area: 195.89 sq ft (18.199 m^{2})
- Total sail area: 335.89 sq ft (31.205 m^{2})

The Santana 26 is a recreational keelboat built by W. D. Schock Corp in the United States, from 1971 until 1974, with 83 boats completed over its four-year production run.

== Design ==
Designed by W. D. Schock Corp's in-house designer, Seymour Paul, it is built predominantly of fiberglass, with wood trim. It has a masthead sloop rig, a raked stem, a nearly-plumb transom, a spade-type rudder controlled by a tiller and a fixed fin keel or optional swing keel.

The boat is normally fitted with a small outboard motor for docking and maneuvering.

The design has sleeping accommodation for four people, with a double "V"-berth in the bow cabin and a drop-down dinette table that forms double berth on the port side. The galley is located on the starboard admidships. The galley is equipped with a two-burner stove, ice box and a sink. The head is located just aft of the bow cabin on the port side.

For sailing the design cane be equipped with a number of jibs or genoas.

The design has a hull speed of 6.15 kn (11.39 km/h).

== Variants ==
Santana 26
This fixed keel model was introduced in 1971. It displaces 5,060 lb (2,295 kg) and carries 2,400 lb (1,089 kg) of ballast. The boat has a draft of 5.00 ft (1.52 m) with the standard keel.
Santana 26 SK
This swing keel model was also introduced in 1971. It displaces 4,460 lb (2,023 kg), carries 1,800 lb (816 kg) of ballast and has a mast that is about 2.6 ft (0.79 m) shorter than the fixed keel model. The boat has a draft of 4.50 ft (1.37 m) with the keel down and 2.75 ft (0.84 m) with it retracted, allowing operation in shallow water, or ground transportation on a trailer.
