= Santana 30/30 =

Sailboat class

Santana 30/30PC
Development
- Designer: Bruce Nelson and Bruce Marek
- Location: United States
- Year: 1981
- No. built: 100
- Builder: W. D. Schock Corp
- Role: Racer-Cruiser
- Name: Santana 30/30PC

Boat
- Displacement: 6,500 lb (2,948 kg)
- Draft: 5.50 ft (1.68 m)

Hull
- Type: Monohull
- Construction: Fiberglass
- LOA: 29.92 ft (9.12 m)
- LWL: 25.42 ft (7.75 m)
- Beam: 10.25 ft (3.12 m)
- Engine: Volvo 13 hp (10 kW) diesel engine

Hull appendages
- Keel: fin keel
- Ballast: 2,310 lb (1,048 kg)
- Rudder: internally-mounted spade-type rudder

Rig
- Rig type: Bermuda rig
- I foretriangle height: 40.80 ft (12.44 m)
- J foretriangle base: 11.70 ft (3.57 m)
- P mainsail luff: 36.20 ft (11.03 m)
- E mainsail foot: 11.10 ft (3.38 m)

Sails
- Sailplan: Masthead sloop
- Mainsail area: 200.91 sq ft (18.665 m^{2})
- Jib/genoa area: 238.68 sq ft (22.174 m^{2})
- Total sail area: 439.59 sq ft (40.839 m^{2})

Racing
- Class association: MORC
- PHRF: 141 (average)

The Santana 30/30 is an American sailboat that was designed by Bruce Nelson and Bruce Marek as a Midget Ocean Racing Club (MORC) racer-cruiser and first built in 1981.

== Production ==
The design was built by W. D. Schock Corp in Corona, California, United States, starting in 1981, but it is now out of production.

== Design ==
The Santana 30/30 is a recreational keelboat, built predominantly of fiberglass, with wood trim. It has a masthead sloop rig, a raked stem, a raised reverse transom, an internally mounted spade-type rudder controlled by a tiller and a fixed fin keel.

The boat has a draft of 5.50 ft (1.68 m) with the standard keel fitted.

The boat is fitted with a Swedish Volvo diesel engine of 13 hp (10 kW). The fuel tank holds 20 U.S. gallons (76 L; 17 imp gal) and the fresh water tank also has a capacity of 20 U.S. gallons (76 L; 17 imp gal).

The design's galley is split with a two-burner alcohol stove and sink on the starboard side and the icebox on the port side, doubling as a navigation table. The head is located forward, just aft of the bow "V"-berth, and includes a hanging locker. Additional sleeping accommodation includes two cabin berths, plus separate dinette settees. There is a large hatch forward.

The mainsheet traveler is mid-cockpit, the halyards are internally-mounted and there are four winches. The Cunningham is a 3:1 arrangement, which the foreguy is 2:1 and the boom vang is 12:1. The boom has two flattening reefs and an internal outhaul and topping lift. The genoa tracks and toe rails are made from aluminum.

The design has a PHRF racing average handicap of 141.

== Operational history ==
Reviewer Richard Sherwood wrote of the design, "this Santana was designed to the MORC rule. Displacement is moderate. The bow is fine and the transom broad. The over-hanging transom reduces length and wetted surface in light air, increasing water line as heeled. She is a performance cruiser, with the emphasis on performance.

Bill Brockaway noted in Sailing World, "the GP, with its lower cabin and fewer interior amenities, is the model you want for racing. A typical PHRF rating for the Santana 30/30 GP is 114, and the boat is raced with six crew."

== Variants ==
Santana 30/30PC (Performance Cruiser)
This model was introduced in 1981 and about 40 were completed. It displaces 6,500 lb (2,948 kg) and carries 2,310 lb (1,048 kg) of ballast.
Santana 30/30PC II
This model was introduced as an update. It has a Yanmar diesel engine, the chainplates relocated outboard to allow the #3 jib to be sheeted inside the shrouds, lowered cabin settee to provide more headroom and angle brackets used to reinforce the interior bulkheads.
Santana 30/30GP (Grand Prix)
This model was introduced in 1983 and about 40 were completed also. It has a lighter deck, displaces 6,000 lb (2,722 kg) and carries 2,435 lb (1,104 kg) of ballast. Starting in 1985 all boats built used eliptical rudders and keels. Some boats have open transoms.

== See also ==
- List of sailing boat types
