= Lindenberg 30 =

Sailboat class

Development
- Designer: Paul Lindenberg
- Location: United States
- Year: 1980
- No. built: 3
- Builder: Lindenberg Yachts
- Role: Racer
- Name: Lindenberg 30

Boat
- Displacement: 6,900 lb (3,130 kg)
- Draft: 5.30 ft (1.62 m)

Hull
- Type: monohull
- Construction: fiberglass
- LOA: 30.00 ft (9.14 m)
- LWL: 27.00 ft (8.23 m)
- Beam: 10.00 ft (3.05 m)
- Engine: inboard motor

Hull appendages
- Keel: fin keel
- Ballast: 3,000 lb (1,361 kg)
- Rudder: internally-mounted spade-type rudder

Rig
- Rig type: Bermuda rig
- I foretriangle height: 41.00 ft (12.50 m)
- J foretriangle base: 12.00 ft (3.66 m)
- P mainsail luff: 35.50 ft (10.82 m)
- E mainsail foot: 11.00 ft (3.35 m)

Sails
- Sailplan: masthead sloop
- Mainsail area: 195.25 sq ft (18.139 m^{2})
- Jib/genoa area: 246.00 sq ft (22.854 m^{2})
- Total sail area: 441.25 sq ft (40.993 m^{2})

The Lindenberg 30 is an American sailboat that was designed by Paul Lindenberg as a lightweight racer and first built in 1980. It was raced in Midget Ocean Racing Club (MORC) competition.

While only three boats were built over a three-year production run, the design was developed into the Wavelength 30, which was produced by W. D. Schock Corp in California from 1980 to 1981, with a further ten boats completed. The Wavelength 30 was named for the prototype Lindenberg 30, which was named Wavelength.

== Production ==
The Lindenberg 30 was built by Lindenberg Yachts in the United States, from 1980 until 1983, with only three boats completed in that four year production run.

== Design ==
The Lindenberg 30 is a recreational keelboat, built predominantly of fiberglass. It has a masthead sloop rig, a near-plumb stem, a reverse transom, an internally mounted spade-type rudder and a fixed fin keel. It displaces 6,900 lb (3,130 kg) and carries 3,000 lb (1,361 kg) of ballast.

The design has a hull speed of 6.96 kn (12.89 km/h).

== Operational history ==
A MORC series was sailed at St Petersburg, Florida from 22 to 26 October 1979 with a fleet of 54 boats. The races were reported in January 1980's Yachting magazine, which noted that overall, "second in division one was Paul Lindenberg's prototype 30-footer, Wavelength, with Mark Ploch of Ulmer Sails at the helm. Although not having the highest rating in the series, Lindenberg appeared to have the fastest boat and easily won every race boat for boat." Wavelength won the first, second and fourth races on uncorrected time and finished fifth in the MORC racing series.

== See also ==
- List of sailing boat types
