= Schock 40 =

Sailboat class

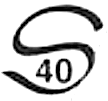

Development
- Designer: Bill Burns, Matt Brown, DynaYacht
- Location: United States
- Year: 2000
- No. built: 10
- Builder: W. D. Schock Corp
- Role: Racer
- Name: Schock 40

Boat
- Crew: 8
- Displacement: 7,000 lb (3,175 kg)
- Draft: 8.00 ft (2.44 m) maximum

Hull
- Type: monohull
- Construction: fiberglass
- LOA: 40.00 ft (12.19 m)
- LWL: 35.00 ft (10.67 m)
- Beam: 10.00 ft (3.05 m)
- Engine: outboard motor

Hull appendages
- Keel: Canting ballast twin foil
- Ballast: 1,800 lb (816 kg)
- Rudder: twin foil rudders

Rig
- Rig type: Bermuda rig
- I foretriangle height: 42.50 ft (12.95 m)
- J foretriangle base: 13.58 ft (4.14 m)
- P mainsail luff: 44.50 ft (13.56 m)
- E mainsail foot: 17.67 ft (5.39 m)

Sails
- Sailplan: masthead sloop
- Mainsail area: 363.16 sq ft (33.739 m^{2})
- Jib/genoa area: 288.58 sq ft (26.810 m^{2})
- Total sail area: 681.73 sq ft (63.335 m^{2})

The Schock 40 is an American sailboat that was designed by DynaYacht as a racer and first built in 2000.

== Production ==
The design was built by W. D. Schock Corp in the United States, starting in 2000, with ten boats built, but it is now out of production.

== Design ==
The Schock 40 is a racing keelboat, built predominantly of fiberglass. It has a masthead sloop rig with a carbon fiber mast and an aluminum boom, a plumb stem with a retractable 6 ft (1.8 m) bowsprit and a reverse transom. It uses DynaYacht's patented CBTF (canting ballast twin foil) system, which greatly reduces the amount of ballast required and thus the overall boat weight. The weighted bulb can be canted up to 55 degrees either side of the boat's plumb line, using a hydraulic cylinder which is actuated by an electric motor, button-controlled from the cockpit helm position. It has dual fore-and-aft linked rudders, displaces 7,000 lb (3,175 kg) and carries 1,800 lb (816 kg) of lead ballast.

The boat has a maximum draft of 8.00 ft (2.44 m) with the canting bulb down.

The boat is normally fitted with an outboard motor for docking and maneuvering. The fuel tank holds 12 U.S. gallons (45 L; 10.0 imp gal) and the fresh water tank also has a capacity of 12 U.S. gallons (45 L; 10.0 imp gal).

The design has a minimalist interior, with stand-up headroom, sleeping accommodation consisting of two settee berths in the main cabin and a fully enclosed head.

For sailing downwind the design may be equipped with an asymmetrical spinnaker. The boat has a hull speed of 7.93 kn (14.69 km/h).

== Operational history ==
In a 2001 review in Sailing World Peter Danjou wrote, "I test-sailed the Schock 40 in San Pedro, Calif., during the Cabrillo Beach YC's Winter Series and can report the new boat is light, narrow, and very fast. The PHRF rating of -6 for wind-ward/leeward racing only begins to tell the story. I wouldn't have believed it if I hadn't seen it with my own eyes, but this 40-foot displacement boat beat an 18-foot skiff (sailed by Howard Hamlin) to the second weather mark in 12 to 15 knots of breeze."

== See also ==
- List of sailing boat types
