= Schock 25 =

1960s US recreational keelboat

Development
- Designer: Seymour Paul
- Location: United States
- Year: 1961
- No. built: 90
- Builder: W. D. Schock Corp
- Role: Day sailer

Boat
- Displacement: 2,210 lb (1,002 kg)
- Draft: 4.00 ft (1.22 m)

Hull
- Type: monohull
- Construction: fiberglass
- LOA: 25.00 ft (7.62 m)
- LWL: 16.25 ft (4.95 m)
- Beam: 7.00 ft (2.13 m)

Hull appendages
- Keel: fin keel
- Ballast: 1,100 lb (499 kg)
- Rudder: keel-mounted rudder

Rig
- Rig type: Bermuda rig
- I foretriangle height: 22.00 ft (6.71 m)
- J foretriangle base: 7.75 ft (2.36 m)
- P mainsail luff: 27.50 ft (8.38 m)
- E mainsail foot: 11.00 ft (3.35 m)

Sails
- Sailplan: fractional rigged sloop masthead sloop
- Mainsail area: 151.25 sq ft (14.052 m^{2})
- Jib/genoa area: 85.25 sq ft (7.920 m^{2})
- Total sail area: 236.50 sq ft (21.972 m^{2})

The Schock 25 is a recreational keelboat built by W. D. Schock Corp in the United States, starting in 1961, with production ending in 1964. A total of 90 boats were built.

== Design ==
Designed by W. D. Schock Corp's in-house designer, Seymour Paul, the Schock 25 is built predominantly of fiberglass, with wood trim. It has a fractional sloop; a raked stem; a raised counter, angled transom, a keel-hung rudder controlled by a tiller and a fixed fin keel. It displaces 2,210 lb (1,002 kg) and carries 1,100 lb (499 kg) of ballast. It has a small cuddy cabin with a single port per side and two berths and a large stern lazarette.

The boat has a draft of 4.00 ft (1.22 m) with the standard keel and a hull speed of 5.4 kn (10.0 km/h).
