= Santana 28 =

Sailboat class

Development
- Designer: W. Shad Turner
- Location: United States
- Year: 1976
- No. built: 40
- Builder: W. D. Schock Corp
- Role: Cruiser
- Name: Santana 28

Boat
- Displacement: 7,500 lb (3,402 kg)
- Draft: 5.00 ft (1.52 m)

Hull
- Type: monohull
- Construction: fiberglass
- LOA: 28.29 ft (8.62 m)
- LWL: 23.00 ft (7.01 m)
- Beam: 9.20 ft (2.80 m)
- Engine: Volvo Penta diesel engine

Hull appendages
- Keel: fin keel
- Ballast: 2,550 lb (1,157 kg)
- Rudder: internally-mounted spade-type rudder

Rig
- Rig type: Bermuda rig
- I foretriangle height: 36.00 ft (10.97 m)
- J foretriangle base: 12.00 ft (3.66 m)
- P mainsail luff: 31.00 ft (9.45 m)
- E mainsail foot: 9.50 ft (2.90 m)

Sails
- Sailplan: masthead sloop
- Mainsail area: 147.25 sq ft (13.680 m^{2})
- Jib/genoa area: 216.00 sq ft (20.067 m^{2})
- Total sail area: 363.25 sq ft (33.747 m^{2})

The Santana 28 is an American sailboat that was designed by W. Shad Turner as a cruiser and first built in 1976.

The design was developed into the Santana 228 in 1978, after just two years in production. The 228 has a redesigned, wedge-shaped coach house and a taller rig with 8% greater sail area and replaced the 28 in the company's product line.

== Production ==
The design was built by W. D. Schock Corp in the United States, from 1976, until 1978, with 40 boats completed, but it is now out of production. The replacement Santana 228 also lasted two years in production, from 1978 to 1980, with 47 boats built.

== Design ==
The Santana 28 is a recreational keelboat, built predominantly of fiberglass, with wood trim. It has a masthead sloop rig, a raked stem, a nearly-plumb transom, an internally mounted spade-type rudder controlled by a tiller and a fixed fin keel. It displaces 7,500 lb (3,402 kg) and carries 2,550 lb (1,157 kg) of ballast.

The boat has a draft of 5.00 ft (1.52 m) with the standard keel and is fitted with a Swedish Volvo Penta diesel engine for docking and maneuvering. The fuel tank holds 11 U.S. gallons (42 L; 9.2 imp gal) and the fresh water tank has a capacity of 20 U.S. gallons (76 L; 17 imp gal).

The design has sleeping accommodation for five people, with a double "V"-berth in the bow cabin, two straight settee berths in the main cabin and an aft quarter berth on the starboard side. The galley is located on the port side just forward of the companionway ladder. The galley is L-shaped and is equipped with a two-burner stove, an icebox and a sink. The head is located just aft of the bow cabin on the starboard side. Cabin headroom is 73 in (185 cm).

For sailing downwind the design may be equipped with a symmetrical spinnaker of 389 sq ft (36.1 m^{2}).

The design has a hull speed of 6.43 kn (11.91 km/h).

== See also ==
- List of sailing boat types
