= Twitchell 12 =

Sailboat class

- T12

Development
- Designer: Ron Holder
- Location: United States
- Year: 1991
- No. built: 27
- Builder: W. D. Schock Corp
- Role: Sailing dinghy

Boat
- Displacement: 165 lb (75 kg)
- Draft: 2.00 ft (0.61 m) with daggerboard down

Hull
- Type: monohull
- Construction: fiberglass
- LOA: 12.00 ft (3.66 m)
- LWL: 10.83 ft (3.30 m)
- Beam: 4.50 ft (1.37 m)

Hull appendages
- Keel: daggerboard
- Rudder: transom-mounted rudder

Rig
- Rig type: Bermuda rig

Sails
- Sailplan: fractional rigged sloop
- Total sail area: 68.00 sq ft (6.317 m^{2})

The Twitchell 12 is an American sailboat that was designed by Ron Holder as a day sailer for people with limited mobility. It was first built in 1991.

== Production ==
The design was built by W. D. Schock Corp in the United States, from 1991 until 1993, with 27 boats completed, but it is now out of production.

== Design ==
The Twitchell 12 is a recreational sailing dinghy, built predominantly of fiberglass, with wood trim. It has a fractional sloop rig with a jib boom, a raked stem, a reverse transom, a transom-hung rudder controlled by a cockpit joystick and a retractable daggerboard. It displaces 165 lb (75 kg).

The boat has a draft of 2.00 ft (0.61 m) with the daggerboard extended and 6 in (15 cm) with it retracted, allowing operation in shallow water, beaching or ground transportation on a trailer.

The design has a hull speed of 4.41 kn (8.17 km/h).

== See also ==
- List of sailing boat types

Similar sailboats

- Martin 16
