= Catalina Catamaran =

Sailboat class

Development
- Designer: Seymour Paul
- Location: United States
- Year: 1960
- No. built: 54
- Builder: W. D. Schock Corp
- Role: Racer and day sailer
- Name: Catalina Catamaran

Boat
- Displacement: 565 lb (256 kg)
- Draft: 2.00 ft (0.61 m) with a centerboard down

Hull
- Type: Catamaran
- Construction: fiberglass
- LOA: 17.04 ft (5.19 m)
- LWL: 16.50 ft (5.03 m)
- Beam: 7.95 ft (2.42 m)

Hull appendages
- Keel: twin centerboards
- Rudder: twin transom-mounted rudders

Rig
- Rig type: Bermuda rig

Sails
- Sailplan: fractional rigged sloop
- Total sail area: 234.00 sq ft (21.739 m^{2})

The Catalina Catamaran is an American catamaran sailboat that was designed by W. D. Schock Corp's in-house designer, Seymour Paul, as a racer and day sailer, It was first built in 1960.

== Production ==
The design was built by W. D. Schock Corp in the United States, from 1960 until 1964, with a total of 54 boats completed, but it is now out of production.

== Design ==
The Catalina Catamaran is a recreational sailing dinghy, with the hulls built predominantly of fiberglass. It has a fractional sloop rig. The hulls have raked stems, plumb transoms, with twin transom-hung rudders controlled by a single tiller. Each hull has a retractable centerboard. The boat displaces 565 lb (256 kg).

The boat has a draft of 2.00 ft (0.61 m) with a centerboard extended and 0.80 ft (0.24 m) with both retracted, allowing operation in shallow water, beaching or ground transportation on a trailer.

For sailing downwind the design may be equipped with a symmetrical spinnaker.

== See also ==
- List of sailing boat types

Similar sailboats

- Hobie 17
