= Santana 35 =

Sailboat class

Development
- Designer: W. Shad Turner
- Location: United States
- Year: 1978
- No. built: 115
- Builder: W. D. Schock Corp
- Role: Racer-Cruiser
- Name: Santana 35

Boat
- Displacement: 8,500 lb (3,856 kg)
- Draft: 6.25 ft (1.91 m)

Hull
- Type: monohull
- Construction: fiberglass
- LOA: 35.00 ft (10.67 m)
- LWL: 26.50 ft (8.08 m)
- Beam: 11.92 ft (3.63 m)
- Engine: Volvo Penta MD7A 13 hp (10 kW) diesel engine

Hull appendages
- Keel: fin keel
- Ballast: 3,300 lb (1,497 kg)
- Rudder: internally-mounted spade-type rudder

Rig
- Rig type: Bermuda rig
- I foretriangle height: 39.00 ft (11.89 m)
- J foretriangle base: 12.85 ft (3.92 m)
- P mainsail luff: 42.00 ft (12.80 m)
- E mainsail foot: 14.25 ft (4.34 m)

Sails
- Sailplan: fractional rigged sloop
- Mainsail area: 299.25 sq ft (27.801 m^{2})
- Jib/genoa area: 250.58 sq ft (23.280 m^{2})
- Total sail area: 549.83 sq ft (51.081 m^{2})

The Santana 35 is an American sailboat that was designed by W. Shad Turner as a racer-cruiser and first built in 1978.

The design was developed into the Schock 35 in 1984, using the same hull design, but a taller mast and deeper keel.

== Production ==
The design was built by W. D. Schock Corp in the United States, from 1978 until 1983, with 115 boats completed, but it is now out of production.

== Design ==
The Santana 35 is a recreational keelboat, built predominantly of fiberglass, with wood trim. It has a fractional sloop rig with aluminum spars, a raked stem, a reverse transom, an internally mounted spade-type rudder controlled by a tiller and a fixed fin keel. It displaces 8,500 lb (3,856 kg) and carries 3,300 lb (1,497 kg) of ballast.

The boat has a draft of 6.25 ft (1.91 m) with the standard keel.

The boat is fitted with a Swedish Volvo Penta MD7A diesel engine of 13 hp (10 kW) for docking and maneuvering. The fuel tank holds 20 U.S. gallons (76 L; 17 imp gal) and the fresh water tank also has a capacity of 20 U.S. gallons (76 L; 17 imp gal).

The design has sleeping accommodation for eight people, with two straight settee berhs and two pilot berths in the main cabin and two aft cabins, each with a double berth. The galley is located on the port side at the companionway ladder. The galley is equipped with a two-burner stove, ice box and a sink. A navigation station is opposite the galley, on the starboard side. The head is located in the bow forepeak and includes a shower.

For sailing downwind the design may be equipped with a symmetrical spinnaker of 451 sq ft (41.9 m^{2}).

The design has a hull speed of 6.9 kn (12.8 km/h).

== See also ==
- List of sailing boat types
