= Wavelength 30 =

Sailboat class

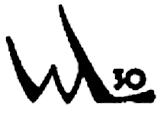

Development
- Designer: Paul Lindenberg
- Location: United States
- Year: 1980
- No. built: 10
- Builder: W. D. Schock Corp
- Role: Racer-Cruiser

Boat
- Displacement: 7,000 lb (3,175 kg)
- Draft: 5.25 ft (1.60 m)

Hull
- Type: monohull
- Construction: fiberglass
- LOA: 29.95 ft (9.13 m)
- LWL: 26.75 ft (8.15 m)
- Beam: 10.00 ft (3.05 m)
- Engine: BMW diesel engine

Hull appendages
- Keel: fin keel
- Ballast: 3,100 lb (1,406 kg)
- Rudder: internally-mounted spade-type rudder

Rig
- Rig type: Bermuda rig
- I foretriangle height: 41.00 ft (12.50 m)
- J foretriangle base: 12.00 ft (3.66 m)
- P mainsail luff: 36.00 ft (10.97 m)
- E mainsail foot: 11.00 ft (3.35 m)

Sails
- Sailplan: masthead sloop
- Mainsail area: 198.00 sq ft (18.395 m^{2})
- Jib/genoa area: 246.00 sq ft (22.854 m^{2})
- Total sail area: 444.00 sq ft (41.249 m^{2})

The Wavelength 30 is an American sailboat that was designed by Paul Lindenberg as a racer-cruiser and first built in 1980.

The Wavelength 30 is a development of the very similar Lindenberg 30, the prototype for which was a boat named Wavelength.

== Production ==
The design was built by W. D. Schock Corp in the United States from 1980 until 1981, with ten boats built, but it is now out of production.

== Design ==
The Wavelength 30 is a racing keelboat, built predominantly of fiberglass, with wood trim. It has a masthead sloop rig, a nearly plumb stem, a reverse transom, an internally mounted spade-type rudder controlled by a tiller and a fixed fin keel. It displaces 7,000 lb (3,175 kg) and carries 3,100 lb (1,406 kg) of ballast.

The boat has a draft of 5.25 ft (1.60 m) and is fitted with a German BMW diesel engine for docking and maneuvering.

The design has a hull speed of 6.93 kn (12.83 km/h).

== See also ==
- List of sailing boat types
