= Polynesian Concept =

Sailboat class

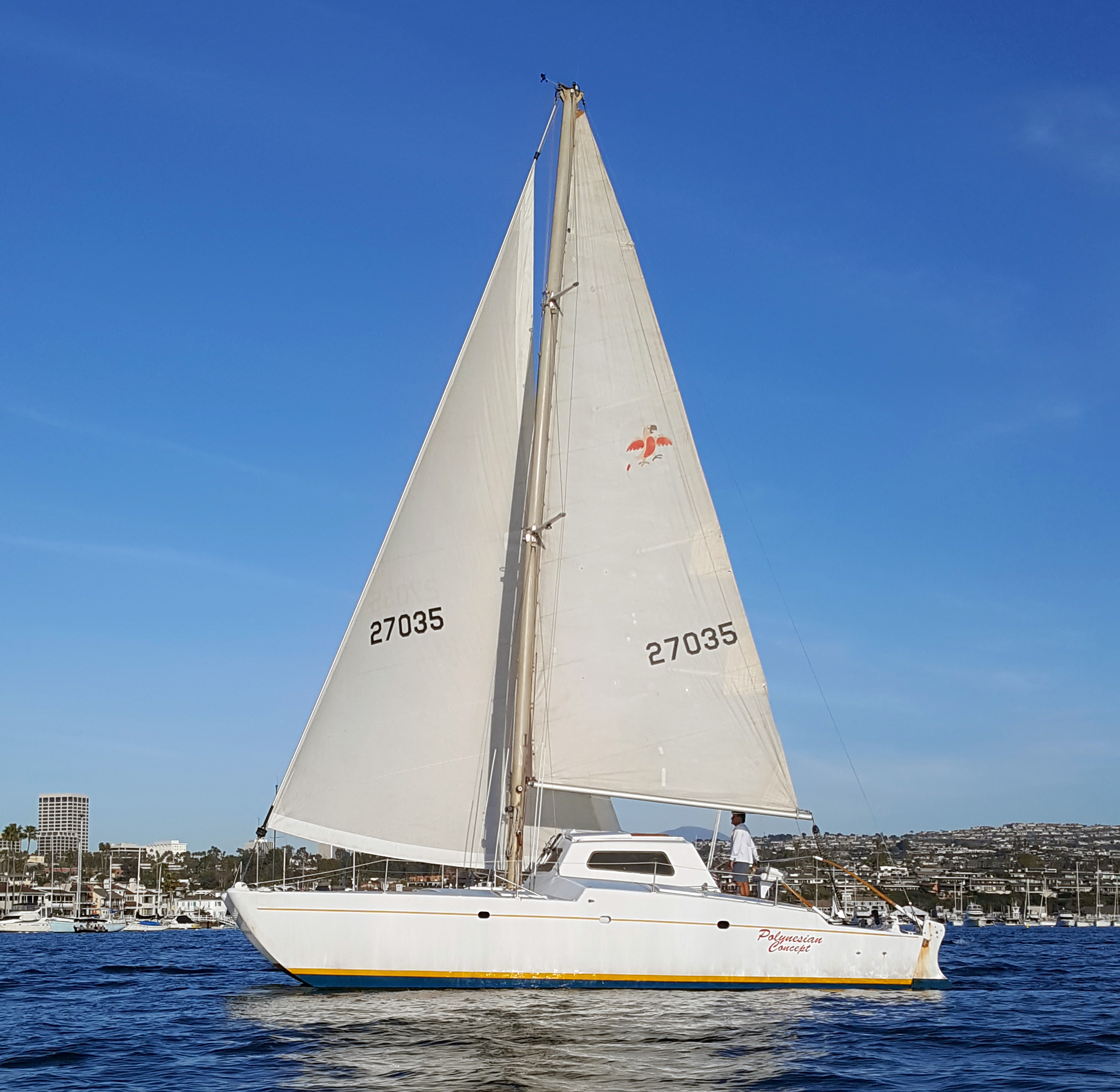

Development
- Designer: Rudy Choy
- Location: United States
- Year: 1970
- No. built: 12
- Builders: W. D. Schock Corp; C/S/K Catamarans
- Role: Cruiser
- Name: Polynesian Concept

Boat
- Displacement: 5,500 lb (2,495 kg)
- Draft: 1.58 ft (0.48 m) with daggerboards up

Hull
- Type: catamaran
- Construction: fiberglass
- LOA: 37.00 ft (11.28 m)
- LWL: 30.50 ft (9.30 m)
- Beam: 17.00 ft (5.18 m)

Hull appendages
- Keel: twin daggerboards
- Rudder: twin transom-mounted rudders

Rig
- Rig type: Bermuda rig

Sails
- Sailplan: masthead sloop
- Total sail area: 805.00 sq ft (74.787 m^{2})

The Polynesian Concept is an American production catamaran sailboat that was designed by Rudy Choy of C/S/K Catamarans, in conjunction with actor Buddy Ebsen. Intended for cruising, it was first built in 1970. Ebsen had built the wooden prototype, named Polynesian Concept and raced it in the 1968 Transpacific Yacht Race.

== Production ==
The design was built by W. D. Schock Corp and by C/S/K Catamarans in the United States, from 1970 to 1972, with 12 boats completed, but it is now out of production. W. D. Schock Corp reported building three of the boats in total.

== Design ==
The Polynesian Concept is a recreational sailing catamaran, built predominantly of fiberglass, with wood trim. It has a masthead sloop rig with double spreaders. The hulls have raked stems, reverse transoms, dual transom-hung rudders controlled by a tiller and twin retractable daggerboards. It displaces 5,500 lb (2,495 kg).

The boat has a draft of 1.58 ft (0.48 m) with the daggerboards retracted, allowing operation in shallow water or beaching.

The design has a hull speed of 7.4 kn (13.7 km/h).

== Operational history ==
Ebsen wrote a book, Polynesian Concept, published by Prentice-Hall in 1972, about sailing the wooden prototype with a professional crew in the 1968 Transpacific Yacht Race from Los Angeles to Honolulu, winning against a field of eight mutihulls on corrected time.

== See also ==
- List of multihulls
- List of sailing boat types
