= Schock 34 PC =

Sailboat class

Development
- Designer: Bruce Nelson and Bruce Marek
- Location: United States
- Year: 1986
- No. built: 40
- Builder: W. D. Schock Corp
- Role: Racer-Cruiser

Boat
- Displacement: 10,350 lb (4,695 kg)
- Draft: 6.50 ft (1.98 m)

Hull
- Type: monohull
- Construction: fiberglass
- LOA: 33.83 ft (10.31 m)
- LWL: 28.67 ft (8.74 m)
- Beam: 11.58 ft (3.53 m)
- Engine: inboard diesel engine

Hull appendages
- Keel: fin keel
- Ballast: 3,850 lb (1,746 kg)
- Rudder: internally-mounted spade-type rudder

Rig
- Rig type: Bermuda rig
- I foretriangle height: 44.10 ft (13.44 m)
- J foretriangle base: 13.00 ft (3.96 m)
- P mainsail luff: 38.00 ft (11.58 m)
- E mainsail foot: 13.60 ft (4.15 m)

Sails
- Sailplan: masthead sloop
- Mainsail area: 258.40 sq ft (24.006 m^{2})
- Jib/genoa area: 286.65 sq ft (26.631 m^{2})
- Total sail area: 545.05 sq ft (50.637 m^{2})

The Schock 34 PC (Performance Cruiser) is an American sailboat that was designed by Bruce Nelson and Bruce Marek as a racer-cruiser and first built in 1986.

The boat is a cruising development of the lightweight racing Schock 34 GP with an 1,850 lb (839 kg) heavier hull and a 2 ft (0.61 m) shorter mast.

== Production ==
The design was built by W. D. Schock Corp in the United States. A total of 40 boats were built, between 1986 and 1990, but it is now out of production.

== Design ==
The Schock 34 GP is a recreational keelboat, built predominantly of fiberglass over a balsa core. It has a masthead sloop rig, a raked stem, a reverse transom, an internally mounted spade-type rudder controlled by a wheel and a fixed fin keel. It displaces 10,350 lb (4,695 kg) and carries 3,850 lb (1,746 kg) of ballast.

The boat has a draft of 6.50 ft (1.98 m) with the standard fin keel and 4.50 ft (1.37 m) with the optional shoal draft wing keel.

The design has sleeping accommodation for seven people, with a double "V"-berth in the bow cabin, a drop-down dinette table and a straight settee in the main cabin and an aft cabin with a double berth on the port side. The galley is located on the starboard side just forward of the companionway ladder. The galley is L-shaped and is equipped with a two-burner stove, ice box and a sink. A navigation station is opposite the galley, on the starboard side. The head is located just aft of the bow cabin on the port side and includes a shower.

The design has a hull speed of 7.18 kn (13.30 km/h).

== Operational history ==
In a 1987 review in Yachting magazine Chris Caswell wrote, "[Instead of the 34-GP], choose the 34-PC (Performance Cruiser), however, and you get the identical hull, with its elliptical keel and balsa coring, but you'd never recognize the two boats as sisters. A full-length cabin, spacious cockpit with wheel steering, and fold-down swim steps make this a Ferrari in Cadillac clothing, lying in wait for some unsuspecting sailor to challenge in an informal afternoon race. One intriguing option is a shoal-draft wing keel, which lops two feet off the draft as well as stiffening the boat up with its ballasted wings. Below, the 34-PC is pure luxury, with a spacious owner's stateroom aft, a private cabin forward with enclosed head, and a teak-lined saloon with twin settees and a large galley."

== See also ==
- List of sailing boat types

Related development

- Schock 34 GP
