= Santana 228 =

Sailboat class

Development
- Designer: W. Shad Turner
- Location: United States
- Year: 1978
- No. built: 47
- Builder: W. D. Schock Corp
- Role: Cruiser

Boat
- Displacement: 7,500 lb (3,402 kg)
- Draft: 5.00 ft (1.52 m)

Hull
- Type: monohull
- Construction: fiberglass
- LOA: 28.29 ft (8.62 m)
- LWL: 23.00 ft (7.01 m)
- Beam: 9.20 ft (2.80 m)
- Engine: Volvo Penta diesel engine

Hull appendages
- Keel: fin keel
- Ballast: 2,550 lb (1,157 kg)
- Rudder: internally-mounted spade-type rudder

Rig
- Rig type: Bermuda rig
- I foretriangle height: 38.00 ft (11.58 m)
- J foretriangle base: 12.00 ft (3.66 m)
- P mainsail luff: 33.00 ft (10.06 m)
- E mainsail foot: 10.00 ft (3.05 m)

Sails
- Sailplan: masthead sloop
- Mainsail area: 165.00 sq ft (15.329 m^{2})
- Jib/genoa area: 228.00 sq ft (21.182 m^{2})
- Spinnaker area: 408.00 sq ft (37.904 m^{2})
- Total sail area: 393.00 sq ft (36.511 m^{2})

The Santana 228 is an American sailboat that was designed by W. Shad Turner as a cruiser and first built in 1978.

The Santana 228 is a development of the Santana 28, which it replaced in production. It uses the same hull design as the 28, but with a newly-designed, wedge-shaped coach house roof and a taller mast.

== Production ==
The design was built by W. D. Schock Corp in the United States, from 1978 to 1980, with 47 boats completed, but it is now out of production.

== Design ==
The Santana 228 is a recreational keelboat, built predominantly of fiberglass. It has a masthead sloop rig, a raked stem, an internally mounted spade-type rudder and a fixed fin keel. It displaces 7,500 lb (3,402 kg) and carries 2,550 lb (1,157 kg) of ballast.

The boat has a draft of 5.00 ft (1.52 m) with the standard keel and is fitted with a Swedish Volvo Penta diesel engine for docking and maneuvering.

For sailing downwind the design may be equipped with a symmetrical spinnaker of 408 sq ft (37.9 m^{2}).

The design has a hull speed of 6.43 kn (11.91 km/h).

== See also ==
- List of sailing boat types
