= Wavelength 24 =

American recreational keelboat

Development
- Designer: Paul Lindenberg
- Location: United States
- Year: 1982
- No. built: 87
- Builder: W. D. Schock Corp
- Name: Wavelength 24

Boat
- Displacement: 2,500 lb (1,134 kg)
- Draft: 4.50 ft (1.37 m)

Hull
- Type: monohull
- Construction: fiberglass
- LOA: 24.00 ft (7.32 m)
- LWL: 20.33 ft (6.20 m)
- Beam: 9.00 ft (2.74 m)
- Engine: outboard motor

Hull appendages
- Keel: fin keel
- Ballast: 1,100 lb (499 kg)
- Rudder: internally-mounted spade-type

Rig
- Rig type: Bermuda rig
- I foretriangle height: 31.25 ft (9.53 m)
- J foretriangle base: 9.50 ft (2.90 m)
- P mainsail luff: 27.33 ft (8.33 m)
- E mainsail foot: 10.25 ft (3.12 m)

Sails
- Sailplan: masthead sloop
- Mainsail area: 140.07 sq ft (13.013 m^{2})
- Jib/genoa area: 148.44 sq ft (13.791 m^{2})
- Total sail area: 288.50 sq ft (26.803 m^{2})

Racing
- Class association: MORC
- PHRF: 162

The Wavelength 24 is a keelboat of which 87 were delivered by W. D. Schock Corp from 1982 to 1990. Production recurred from 2005 to 2021.

Designed by Paul Lindenberg as a Midget Ocean Racing Club racer, the fiberglass hull has a raked stem, a walk-through reverse transom, an internally mounted spade-type rudder controlled by a tiller and a fixed fin keel.

It has a masthead sloop rig.

The reintroduced 2005 version incorporated some design changes including an optional wing keel, as well as hammock style bunks with storage underneath.

The boat has a draft of 4.50 ft (1.37 m) with the standard fin keel.

The boat is normally fitted with a small 3 to 6 hp (2 to 4 kW) cockpit well-mounted outboard motor.

The original interior design has sleeping accommodation for four people, with a double "V"-berth in the bow cabin and two straight settee berths in the main cabin. The galley is located on the starboard side just aft of the companionway ladder. The galley is equipped with a pull-out two-burner stove and a sink. The head is located in the bow cabin under the "V"-berth. Cabin headroom is 51 in (130 cm).

The design hasa hull speed of 6.0 kn (11.1 km/h).

It is "remarkably similar" to the Santana 23, and a "near clone" of the Santana 23D.
