= Schock 22 =

1960 US recreational keelboat

- S22

Development
- Designer: Wendell H. Calkins
- Location: United States
- Year: 1960
- No. built: 26
- Builder: W. D. Schock Corp
- Role: Cruiser
- Name: Schock 22

Boat
- Displacement: 2,100 lb (953 kg)
- Draft: 4.17 ft (1.27 m) with centerboard down

Hull
- Type: monohull
- Construction: fiberglass
- LOA: 22.00 ft (6.71 m)
- LWL: 20.00 ft (6.10 m)
- Beam: 7.50 ft (2.29 m)
- Engine: outboard motor

Hull appendages
- Keel: stub keel and centerboard
- Ballast: 715 lb (324 kg)
- Rudder: transom-mounted rudder

Rig
- Rig type: Bermuda rig
- I foretriangle height: 22.50 ft (6.86 m)
- J foretriangle base: 8.70 ft (2.65 m)
- P mainsail luff: 25.20 ft (7.68 m)
- E mainsail foot: 11.70 ft (3.57 m)

Sails
- Sailplan: fractional rigged sloop
- Mainsail area: 147.42 sq ft (13.696 m^{2})
- Jib/genoa area: 97.88 sq ft (9.093 m^{2})
- Total sail area: 245.30 sq ft (22.789 m^{2})

The Schock 22 is a recreational keelboat built by W. D. Schock Corp in the United States, starting in 1960, with 26 boats completed, before production ended.

== Design ==
The Schock 22 is built predominantly of fiberglass, with wood trim. It has a fractional sloop rig, a spooned and nearly-plumb stem, a vertical transom, a transom-hung rudder controlled by a tiller and a fixed stub keel with a retractable centerboard. It displaces 2,100 lb (953 kg) and carries 715 lb (324 kg) of ballast.

The boat has a draft of 4.17 ft (1.27 m) with the centerboard extended and 2.17 ft (0.66 m) with it retracted, allowing operation in shallow water or ground transportation on a trailer.

The boat is normally fitted with a small outboard motor for docking and maneuvering.

The design has a hull speed of 5.99 kn (11.09 km/h).
