= Schock 41 =

Sailboat class

Development
- Designer: William E. Cook
- Location: United States
- Year: 1983
- No. built: 5
- Builder: W. D. Schock Corp
- Role: Racer
- Name: Schock 41

Boat
- Displacement: 15,800 lb (7,167 kg)
- Draft: 7.50 ft (2.29 m)

Hull
- Type: monohull
- Construction: fiberglass
- LOA: 40.75 ft (12.42 m)
- LWL: 32.17 ft (9.81 m)
- Beam: 12.92 ft (3.94 m)
- Engine: Pathfinder 50 hp (37 kW) diesel engine

Hull appendages
- Keel: fin keel
- Ballast: 7,500 lb (3,402 kg)
- Rudder: internally-mounted spade-type rudder

Rig
- Rig type: Bermuda rig
- I foretriangle height: 54.60 ft (16.64 m)
- J foretriangle base: 16.20 ft (4.94 m)
- P mainsail luff: 48.00 ft (14.63 m)
- E mainsail foot: 15.00 ft (4.57 m)

Sails
- Sailplan: masthead sloop
- Mainsail area: 360.00 sq ft (33.445 m^{2})
- Jib/genoa area: 442.26 sq ft (41.087 m^{2})
- Spinnaker area: 789 sq ft (73.3 m^{2})
- Total sail area: 802.26 sq ft (74.532 m^{2})

Racing
- Class association: IOR

The Schock 41 Grand Prix is an American sailboat that was designed by William E. Cook as an International Offshore Rule (IOR) racer and first built in 1983.

== Production ==
The design was built by W. D. Schock Corp in the United States, from 1983 until 1985, with five boats completed, but it is now out of production.

== Design ==
The prototype was raced in the 1984 Southern Ocean Racing Conference (SORC) with a crew that included builder Tom Schock and the designer, William E. Cook. Experience from those races was used to refine the design for production. The intention was to create a less-expensive, production, high performance IOR racing boat in a field that was at that time dominated by custom-built boats.

The Schock 41 is a racing keelboat, built predominantly of fiberglass, with a Baltek CK-57 balsa core in the hull and deck for lightness, and with wood trim. It has a masthead sloop rig, a raked stem, a reverse transom, an internally mounted spade-type rudder controlled by a tiller and a fixed fin keel. It displaces 15,800 lb (7,167 kg) and carries 7,500 lb (3,402 kg) of lead ballast.

The boat has a draft of 7.50 ft (2.29 m) with the standard keel.

The boat is fitted with a Pathfinder diesel engine of 50 hp (37 kW) for docking and maneuvering. The fuel tank holds 20 U.S. gallons (76 L; 17 imp gal) and the fresh water tank also has a capacity of 20 U.S. gallons (76 L; 17 imp gal).

The design has sleeping accommodation for six people, with two straight settee berths in the main cabin, two pilot berths above and two pipe berths under the cockpit. The galley is located on the port side just forward of the companionway ladder. The galley is L-shaped and is equipped with a stove, ice box and a sink. A navigation station is opposite the galley, on the starboard side. The engine cover box provides a mount for the drop-leaf table, with space for eight people. The cabin sole is teak and holly. The head is located in the bow on the port side.

For sailing downwind the design may be equipped with a symmetrical spinnaker of 789 sq ft (73.3 m^{2}).

The design has a hull speed of 7.6 kn (14.1 km/h).

== Operational history ==
In a 1984 review for Yachting, Chris Caswell noted, "the Schock 41 Grand Prix is delivered with an extensive inventory of equipment, including 14 Barient winches, spinnaker pole and reaching strut, Navtec hydraulics, Martec folding prop, and Kevlar sheets. Post-SORC changes have dropped the IOR rating to 31.5, making the boat highly competitive."

== See also ==
- List of sailing boat types
