= Schock 34 GP =

Sailboat class

Development
- Designer: Bruce Nelson and Bruce Marek
- Location: United States
- Year: 1985
- No. built: 3
- Builder: W. D. Schock Corp
- Role: IOR racer

Boat
- Displacement: 8,500 lb (3,856 kg)
- Draft: 6.50 ft (1.98 m)

Hull
- Type: monohull
- Construction: fiberglass
- LOA: 33.83 ft (10.31 m)
- LWL: 28.60 ft (8.72 m)
- Beam: 11.58 ft (3.53 m)
- Engine: Yanmar 2GM20 18 hp (13 kW) diesel engine

Hull appendages
- Keel: fin keel
- Ballast: 3,220 lb (1,461 kg)
- Rudder: internally-mounted spade-type rudder

Rig
- Rig type: Bermuda rig
- I foretriangle height: 44.10 ft (13.44 m)
- J foretriangle base: 13.00 ft (3.96 m)
- P mainsail luff: 40.00 ft (12.19 m)
- E mainsail foot: 14.00 ft (4.27 m)

Sails
- Sailplan: masthead sloop
- Mainsail area: 280.00 sq ft (26.013 m^{2})
- Jib/genoa area: 286.65 sq ft (26.631 m^{2})
- Total sail area: 566.65 sq ft (52.644 m^{2})

The Schock 34 GP (Grand Prix) is an American sailboat that was designed by Bruce Nelson and Bruce Marek as an International Offshore Rule racer and first built in 1985.

The boat is a lightweight racing development of the Schock 34 PC with an 1,850 lb (839 kg) lighter hull and a 2 ft (0.61 m) taller mast.

== Production ==
The design was built by W. D. Schock Corp in the United States. Only three boats were built, all in 1985 and it is now out of production.

== Design ==
The Schock 34 GP is a racing keelboat, built predominantly of fiberglass. It has a masthead sloop rig, a raked stem, a reverse transom, an internally mounted spade-type rudder controlled by a wheel and a fixed fin keel. It displaces 8,500 lb (3,856 kg) and carries 3,220 lb (1,461 kg) of lead ballast.

The boat has a draft of 6.50 ft (1.98 m) with the standard keel.

The boat is fitted with a Japanese Yanmar 2GM20 diesel engine of 18 hp (13 kW) for docking and maneuvering. The fuel tank holds 20 U.S. gallons (76 L; 17 imp gal) and the fresh water tank also has a capacity of 20 U.S. gallons (76 L; 17 imp gal).

The design has a hull speed of 7.17 kn (13.28 km/h).

== Operational history ==
In a 1987 review in Yachting magazine Chris Caswell wrote, "Pick the 34-GP (Grand Prix), and you get everything Nelson/Marek has learned about winning ocean races: a low-profile cabin, wide cockpit bisected by a husky traveler, dotted with two-speed winches and swept by along tiller, a tall double-spreader rig, and a stark interior best suited for young men intent on winning races and nothing else. Scott Allan won YACHTING’s Block Island Race Week with an early 34-GP, and Dave Ullman has been tearing up the West Coast, including the prestigious Whitney Series, with another."

== See also ==
- List of sailing boat types

Related development

- Schock 34 PC
