= Santana 37 =

Sailboat class

Development
- Designer: Gary Mull
- Location: United States
- Year: 1969
- No. built: 21
- Builder: W. D. Schock Corporation
- Name: Santana 37

Boat
- Displacement: 15,000 lb (6,804 kg)
- Draft: 5.58 ft (1.70 m)

Hull
- Type: Monohull
- Construction: Fiberglass
- LOA: 37.67 ft (11.48 m)
- LWL: 30.00 ft (9.14 m)
- Beam: 11.67 ft (3.56 m)

Hull appendages
- Keel: fin keel
- Ballast: 6,600 lb (2,994 kg)
- Rudder: internally-mounted spade-type rudder

Rig
- General: Masthead sloop
- I foretriangle height: 47.30 ft (14.42 m)
- J foretriangle base: 15.63 ft (4.76 m)
- P mainsail luff: 39.50 ft (12.04 m)
- E mainsail foot: 15.60 ft (4.75 m)

Sails
- Mainsail area: 308.10 sq ft (28.623 m^{2})
- Jib/genoa area: 369.65 sq ft (34.342 m^{2})
- Total sail area: 677.75 sq ft (62.965 m^{2})

Racing
- PHRF: 135 (average, TR model)

The Santana 37 is an American sailboat, that was designed by Gary Mull and first built in 1969. The design is out of production.

== Production ==
The boat was built by W. D. Schock Corporation in the United States, who completed 21 examples between 1969 and 1972.

== Design ==
The Santana 37 is a small recreational keelboat, built predominantly of fiberglass, with wood trim. It has a fractional sloop masthead sloop rig, an internally-mounted spade-type/transom-hung rudder and a fixed fin keel. It displaces 15,000 lb (6,804 kg) and carries 6,600 lb (2,994 kg) of ballast. The boat has a draft of 5.58 ft (1.70 m) with the standard keel.

It has a hull speed of 7.34 kn (13.59 km/h).

== Variants ==
Sanatana 37
Standard model.
Sanatana 37 T or TR
Model with a taller rig by about 2.7 ft (0.8 m). This model has a PHRF racing average handicap of 135 with a high of 132 and low of 138.

== See also ==
- List of sailing boat types
