= Setanta GAA =

Setanta GAA or Setanta Hurling Club may refer to:

- Setanta Berlin GAA, a sports club in Germany
- Setanta Hurling Club (Donegal), a sports club in Killygordon, Ireland
- Setanta Hurling Club (Dublin), a sports club in Ballymun, Ireland

== See also ==
- Setanta Sports#Programming, television channel that aired GAA coverage
- Setanta Sports 1#Gaelic Athletic Association, television channel that aired GAA coverage
- Setanta (disambiguation)
