= Santhana =

Santhana may refer to:

- Santhana Krishnan Ravichandran (fl. from 2015), Indian cinematographer
- Sri Santhana Srinivasa Perumal Temple, Indian religious facility
