= Santana 25 =

1970s IOR keelboat design

Santana 25-1
Development
- Designer: W. Shad Turner
- Location: United States
- Year: 1973
- No. built: 160
- Builder: W. D. Schock Corp
- Role: Racer

Boat
- Displacement: 4,050 lb (1,837 kg)
- Draft: 4.08 ft (1.24 m)

Hull
- Type: monohull
- Construction: fiberglass
- LOA: 24.58 ft (7.49 m)
- LWL: 19.50 ft (5.94 m)
- Beam: 7.82 ft (2.38 m)
- Engine: outboard motor

Hull appendages
- Keel: fin keel
- Ballast: 1,800 lb (816 kg)
- Rudder: transom-mounted rudder

Rig
- Rig type: Bermuda rig
- I foretriangle height: 31.16 ft (9.50 m)
- J foretriangle base: 10.00 ft (3.05 m)
- P mainsail luff: 27.00 ft (8.23 m)
- E mainsail foot: 7.83 ft (2.39 m)

Sails
- Sailplan: masthead sloop
- Mainsail area: 105.71 sq ft (9.821 m^{2})
- Jib/genoa area: 155.80 sq ft (14.474 m^{2})
- Total sail area: 261.51 sq ft (24.295 m^{2})

Racing
- PHRF: 222

The Santana 25 is a recreational keelboat designed by W. Shad Turner as an International Offshore Rule Quarter Ton class racer and first built in 1973. The boat was Turner's first design.

== Production ==
The design was built by W. D. Schock Corp in the United States, from 1973 to 1977 but it is now out of production.

== Design ==
The Santana 25 is built predominantly of fiberglass, with wood trim. It has a masthead sloop rig, a raked stem, a reverse transom, a transom-hung rudder controlled by a tiller and a fixed fin keel or swing keel. The fixed keel model displaces 4,050 lb (1,837 kg) and carries 1,800 lb (816 kg) of ballast, while the swing keel model displaces 3,600 lb (1,633 kg) and carries 1,370 lb (621 kg) of ballast. The swing keel model also has less sail area.

The keel-equipped version of the boat has a draft of 4.08 ft (1.24 m), while the swing keel-equipped version has a draft of 5.5 ft (1.7 m) with the centerboard extended and 2.58 ft (0.79 m) with it retracted, allowing operation in shallow water, beaching or ground transportation on a trailer.

The boat is normally fitted with a small 6 to 8 hp (4 to 6 kW) outboard motor for docking and maneuvering.

The design has sleeping accommodation for four people, with a double "V"-berth in the bow cabin and two straight settees in the main cabin along with a swing table. The galley is located on both sides at the companionway ladder. The head is located just aft of the bow cabin on the starboard side. Cabin headroom is 62 in (157 cm).

The design has a PHRF racing average handicap of 222 and a hull speed of 5.9 kn (10.9 km/h).

== Variants ==
Santana 25-1
This model was introduced in 1973 and produced until 1977 with 160 boats completed. It has a cast iron keel.
Santana 25-2
This model was introduced in 1973. It has a revised cabin top and deck design, plus a lead keel.
