= Hobie 17 =

Sailboat class

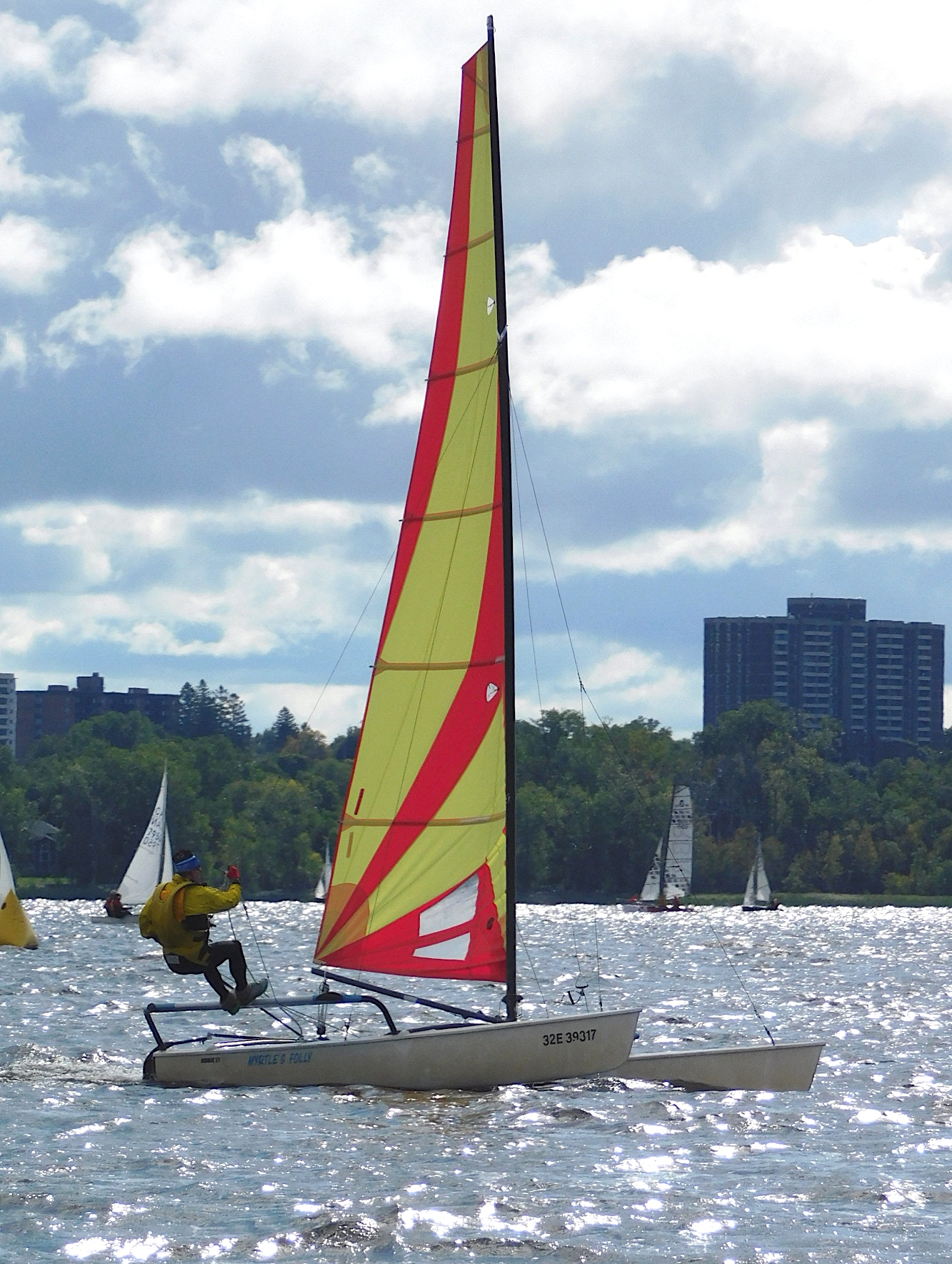

Development
- Designer: John Wake
- Location: United States
- Year: 1985
- Builder: Hobie Cat

Boat
- Crew: one
- Displacement: 315 lb (143 kg)
- Draft: 1.50 ft (0.46 m)

Hull
- Type: Catamaran
- Construction: Fiberglass
- LOA: 17.00 ft (5.18 m)
- LWL: 16.75 ft (5.11 m)
- Beam: 7.92 ft (2.41 m)
- Engine: none

Hull appendages
- Keel: twin centerboards
- Ballast: none
- Rudder: twin transom-mounted rudders

Rig
- Rig type: Cat rig

Sails
- Sailplan: catboat
- Mainsail area: 168.00 sq ft (15.608 m^{2})
- Total sail area: 168.00 sq ft (15.608 m^{2})

Racing
- D-PN: 74.0

The Hobie 17 is an American catamaran that was designed by John Wake as a single-handed racer and first built in 1985.

The design was accepted as an International Sailing Federation International class in 1990.

== Production ==
The design was built by Hobie Cat in the United States from 1985 until 2004–2005, but it is now out of production.

== Design ==
The Hobie 17 is a recreational sailboat, built predominantly of polyester fiberglass with a foam sandwich core. It has a catboat rig or optional sloop rig, with a rotating mast. The dual hulls each have nearly plumb stems, vertical transoms, transom-hung rudders controlled by a tiller and retractable centerboards. The boat initially was designed to displace 315 lb (143 kg) and can be equipped with a trapeze.

The design has a draft of 1.50 ft (0.46 m) with the centerboard extended and 0.42 ft (0.13 m) with it retracted, allowing beaching or ground transportation on a trailer.

The boat has a beam of 7.92 ft (2.41 m), but can be equipped with hiking/trapezing "wings", giving a beam of 11.58 ft (3.53 m).

Early versions were delivered at the 315 lb (143 kg) weight, but suffered durability issues and the hulls were thickened, giving a weight of 330 to 350 lb (150 to 159 kg).

== Variants ==
Hobie 17
The base model is cat rigged and designed to be sailed by one person. The design has a Portsmouth Yardstick racing average handicap of 74.0.
Hobie 17 Sport
This model has a jib and a Portsmouth Yardstick racing average handicap of 74.5.

== Operational history ==
Upon introduction the boat immediately became a commercial success and racing fleets were quickly started in North America, Europe and Australia.

The International Hobie Class Association describes the boat's sailing characteristics: "the 17 is a heavy air machine. The added leverage of the wings for trapezing makes the 17 go upwind like no other catamaran, and the main is easily depowered with a 6:1 downhaul, the mast rotator, 2:1 outhaul and a 7:1 mainsheet. Downwind, the boat is pitchpole resistant (not “proof”) and a bit underpowered, which makes working the waves a high priority. Downwind, the boat is sailed at 90° to the apparent wind. The 17 is uncomfortable to race in under 7 knots of breeze, since most of the time you'll be sitting on the forward wing tube. Weight is kept as far forward as possible while keeping the bow tips out of waves and to keep from pitchpoling. In very light air downwind, racers will often stand out on the bow, holding on to the bridle wire to keep the sterns out of the water. Raising the windward rudder downwind is a common practice."

== See also ==
- List of sailing boat types

Similar sailboats

- Catalina Catamaran
- Nacra 5.2
