= Santana 21 =

1970s US recreational keelboat

Development
- Designer: Seymour Paul
- Location: United States
- Year: 1969
- No. built: 879
- Builder: W. D. Schock Corp
- Role: Racer-Cruiser
- Name: Santana 21

Boat
- Displacement: 1,700 lb (771 kg)
- Draft: 5.00 ft (1.52 m) with keel down

Hull
- Type: monohull
- Construction: fiberglass
- LOA: 21.25 ft (6.48 m)
- LWL: 19.33 ft (5.89 m)
- Beam: 7.50 ft (2.29 m)
- Engine: outboard motor

Hull appendages
- Keel: swing keel
- Ballast: 550 lb (249 kg)
- Rudder: transom-mounted rudder

Rig
- Rig type: Bermuda rig
- I foretriangle height: 23.50 ft (7.16 m)
- J foretriangle base: 9.50 ft (2.90 m)
- P mainsail luff: 21.50 ft (6.55 m)
- E mainsail foot: 8.00 ft (2.44 m)

Sails
- Sailplan: fractional rigged sloop
- Mainsail area: 86.00 sq ft (7.990 m^{2})
- Jib/genoa area: 111.63 sq ft (10.371 m^{2})
- Total sail area: 197.63 sq ft (18.360 m^{2})

Racing
- PHRF: 267

The Santana 21 is a recreational keelboat built by W. D. Schock Corp in the United States between 1969 and 1976, with 879 boats completed, but it is now out of production.

== Design ==
The Santana 21 is built predominantly of fiberglass, with wood trim. It has a fractional sloop rig, a raked stem, a nearly-plumb transom, a transom-hung rudder controlled by a tiller and a stub keel with a swing keel. It displaces 1,700 lb (771 kg) and carries 550 lb (249 kg) of iron ballast.

The design has a draft of 5.00 ft (1.52 m) with the keel extended and 1.50 ft (0.46 m) with it retracted, allowing operation in shallow water, or ground transportation on a trailer.

The boat is normally fitted with a small 3 to 6 hp (2 to 4 kW) outboard motor for docking and maneuvering.

The design has sleeping accommodation for four people, with a double "V"-berth in the bow cabin and two straight settee berths in the main cabin. The head is located just aft of the bow cabin on the port side. Cabin headroom is 46 in (117 cm).

For sailing downwind the design may be equipped with a symmetrical or an asymmetrical spinnaker.

The design has a PHRF racing average handicap of 267 and a hull speed of 5.9 kn (10.9 km/h).

== Reception ==
In a 2010 review Steve Henkel wrote, "...the Santana 21 was conceived as a lightweight racer-cruiser, with the emphasis on racing, In fact, with a D/L ratio of 86, she is technically classified as an ultralight. Her major distinction is her unique 550-pound hinged cast-iron keel, mounted in a one-foot-deep fixed stub keel. The swinging part reaches five feet below the waterline in the down position, providing considerable righting moment. The swing-keel trunk has a massive cast-iron hinge weighing approximately 100 pounds, which is said in the builder's literature to give the swinging part 'superior lateral support and protects it during beaching maneuvers.' Best features: She looks fast to us ... Worst features: The rudder is detachable but not hinged, limiting navigation to waters deeper than three feet (or slightly less in absolutely calm protected water) despite the announced eighteen inch minimum draft. The depth of the keel is controlled by a winch mounted down below, just forward of the mast (see inboard profile), not easy to get to in an emergency. With 3' 10" headroom, cruising of any significant duration would best be done by shorter than average sailors or those with flexible backs."

A review in Sailrite reported, "the Santana 21 performs well in most conditions and is very fun to sail. The Santana 21 has reasonable accommodations for a 21 footer."
