= Santana 27 =

Sailboat class

Development
- Designer: Gary Mull
- Location: United States
- Year: 1967
- No. built: 210
- Builder: W. D. Schock Corporation
- Name: Santana 27

Boat
- Displacement: 5,000 lb (2,268 kg)
- Draft: 4.25 ft (1.30 m)

Hull
- Type: Monohull
- Construction: Fiberglass
- LOA: 27.04 ft (8.24 m)
- LWL: 22.50 ft (6.86 m)
- Beam: 9.00 ft (2.74 m)

Hull appendages
- Keel: fin keel
- Ballast: 2,300 lb (1,043 kg)
- Rudder: internally-mounted spade-type rudder

Rig
- General: Masthead sloop
- I foretriangle height: 33.75 ft (10.29 m)
- J foretriangle base: 11.25 ft (3.43 m)
- P mainsail luff: 27.50 ft (8.38 m)
- E mainsail foot: 11.50 ft (3.51 m)

Sails
- Mainsail area: 158.13 sq ft (14.691 m^{2})
- Jib/genoa area: 189.84 sq ft (17.637 m^{2})
- Total sail area: 347.97 sq ft (32.327 m^{2})

Racing
- PHRF: 201 (average)

The Santana 27 is an American sailboat, that was designed by Gary Mull and first built in 1967. The design is out of production.

== Production ==
The boat was built by W. D. Schock Corporation in the United States between 1967 and 1974, with 210 boats completed.

== Design ==
The Santana 27 is a small recreational keelboat, built predominantly of fiberglass, with wooden trim. It has a masthead sloop rig, an internally-mounted spade-type rudder and a fixed fin keel. It displaces 5,000 lb (2,268 kg) and carries 2,300 lb (1,043 kg) of iron ballast. The boat has a draft of 4.25 ft (1.30 m) with the standard fin keel.

The boat has a PHRF racing average handicap of 201 with a high of 211 and low of 198. It has a hull speed of 6.36 kn (11.78 km/h).

== See also ==
- List of sailing boat types
