= Santana 22 =

1966–2010 recreational keelboat

Development
- Designer: Gary Mull
- Location: United States
- Year: 1966
- No. built: 800
- Builders: W. D. Schock Corporation; Triton Boat Company
- Name: Santana 22

Boat
- Displacement: 2,600 lb (1,179 kg)
- Draft: 3.50 ft (1.07 m)

Hull
- Type: Monohull
- Construction: Fiberglass
- LOA: 22.25 ft (6.78 m)
- LWL: 18.75 ft (5.72 m)
- Beam: 7.50 ft (2.29 m)

Hull appendages
- Keel: fin keel
- Ballast: 1,230 lb (558 kg)
- Rudder: internally-mounted spade-type rudder

Rig
- General: Masthead sloop
- I foretriangle height: 26.00 ft (7.92 m)
- J foretriangle base: 8.50 ft (2.59 m)
- P mainsail luff: 21.80 ft (6.64 m)
- E mainsail foot: 9.90 ft (3.02 m)

Sails
- Mainsail area: 107.91 sq ft (10.025 m^{2})
- Jib/genoa area: 110.50 sq ft (10.266 m^{2})
- Total sail area: 218.41 sq ft (20.291 m^{2})

Racing
- PHRF: 249 (average)

The Santana 22 is a recreational keelboat. 747 were built by W. D. Schock Corporation in the United States from 1966 to 2010. Some were also built in Australia by the Triton Boat Company. A total of 800 were completed, but the design is currently out of production.

== Design ==
The Santana 22 was Gary Mull's first design, commissioned by Bill Schock, whom Mull had met in 1965. Mull described the design process, "Bill Schock kept saying, 'What would you do if you were going to draw a boat that would be faster than a Cal 20?' That was the real yardstick boat at that time. We were sketching on the backs of napkins, as we do. "Right after that lunch, I had to fly to New York, and when I came back, there were all these messages on the desk, 'Call Bill Schock; Call Bill Schock,' so I called and said 'What do you need?' And he said 'Where the hell are the drawings?' I said, 'What drawings?' He said, 'You said you were going to design a boat for me.' I said, 'No, you said you were going to call me if you wanted me to.' And he said, 'Well, I called.' I said, 'Oh!' And that got me started designing sailboats. The first one was the Santana 22."

The design competed with the Jensen Marine Cal 20 sailboat in the market.

The Santana 22 is a small recreational keelboat, built predominantly of fiberglass, with wood trim. It has a masthead sloop rig, an internally-mounted spade-type rudder and a fixed fin keel. It displaces 2,600 lb (1,179 kg) and carries 1,230 lb (558 kg) of ballast.

The boat has a draft of 3.5 ft (1.1 m) with the standard keel and 2.5 ft (0.76 m) with the optional shoal draft keel.

The boat is normally fitted with a small 3 to 6 hp (2 to 4 kW) outboard motor for docking and maneuvering.

The design has sleeping accommodation for four people, with a double "V"-berth in the bow cabin and two straight settee quarter berths in the main cabin. The galley is located on both sides just after the bow cabin. The galley is equipped with an optional stove to starboard and a sink to port. The head is located in the bow cabin, centered under the "V"-berth. Cabin headroom is 46 in (117 cm).

The boat has a PHRF racing average handicap of 249 with a high of 277 and low of 234. It has a hull speed of 5.79 kn (10.72 km/h).

== Reception ==
In a 2010 review Steve Henkel wrote, "Best features: Compared to her comp[etitor]s, the Santana may be considered old-fashioned, with her narrow beam and squared off fin keel, spade-rudder underbody. But she is a wholesome design that many consider ageless—easy and fun to sail, forgiving, and still good-looking after all these years ... Worst features: As a 1965 design she is, after all, a bit old-fashioned. And compared with her comp[etitor]s, her deeper draft makes her harder to launch from a trailer."
