= W. D. Schock Corp =

American sailboat manufacturer

W. D. Schock Corporation
- Company type: Privately held company
- Industry: Boat building
- Founded: 1958
- Founder: William "Bill" D. Schock
- Headquarters: Santa Ana, California, United States
- Key people: President: John O'Donnell
- Products: Sailboats
- Website: www.wdschockcorp.com

The W. D. Schock Corporation (usually styled W. D. Schock Corp) is an American boat builder originally based in Newport Beach, California, later in Corona, California and currently located in Santa Ana, California. The company was founded by William "Bill" D. Schock in 1958 and specializes in the design and manufacture of fiberglass sailboats.

== History ==
Bill Schock built his first boat at age 13, a Skimmer sailing dinghy constructed in the family garage in Hollywood, California. After his time as a crew chief in the military in the Second World War, he returned home to live in a small beach house in Newport Beach and started a boat repair business there. Among his early customers was an amusement park, who had a rental fleet of boats.

Schock's first boat built and sold was an International 14 that he intended to sail himself and constructed using a cold-molded wood method. Another sailor saw the boat while it was under construction and bought it from Schock. This led to the formation of the company, initially called W. D. Schock Boat Building and Repair.

In 1955 Schock bought out Barney Lehman's company, PlastiGlass and its designs.

The first design mass-produced was the Lehman 10 dinghy. The Lehman 14 was updated to become the Lido 14 and proved a commercial success, propelling the company to become one of the biggest boat builders on the US Pacific Ocean coast.

In the 1960s Seymour Paul was the company's in-house designer and he drew boats such as the 1960 Catalina Catamaran and the 1969 Santana 21.

In the late 1970s the company hired a number of designers to create a series of sailboats in the Santana series. Early designs by Gary Mull include the Santana 22 in 1966. Yacht designer W. Shad Turner later designed the company's early racing keel-boat line that including the Santana 25-1, Santana 25-2 in 1973, the commercially successful Santana 20 in 1976 and the Santana 28 in 1978. The Santana 228 followed in 1978, the Santana 23 D the same year, with the Santana 35 in 1979, Santana 23 K in 1980 and the Schock 35 in 1984.

Eventually Bill Schock passed the company to his son Tom Schock and Tom's wife Jane. Son Steven Schock was also involved in the design of some of the sailboats, drawing and designing the Harbor 20.

In 2011, after 53 years in business, the company was sold to Alexander Vucelic von Raduboj, who became the new president, while Tom Schock remained on the company's board of directors. In 2014, the company was sold to John O'Donnell, who had formerly been the general manager.

In 2018 the company was producing four designs, the Harbor 20, Harbor 25, Harbor 30 and the US Sabot. By 2020 the company was only building the Harbor 20.

== Boats ==
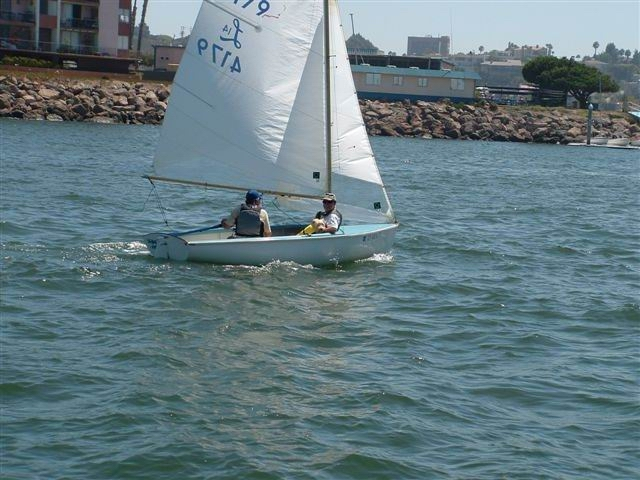
Lido 14

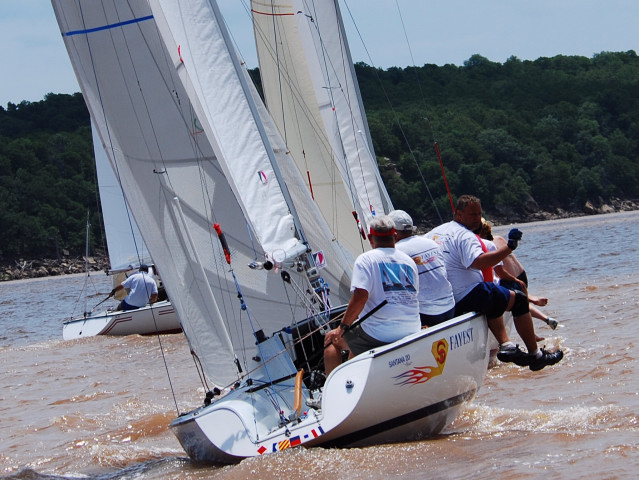
Santana 20

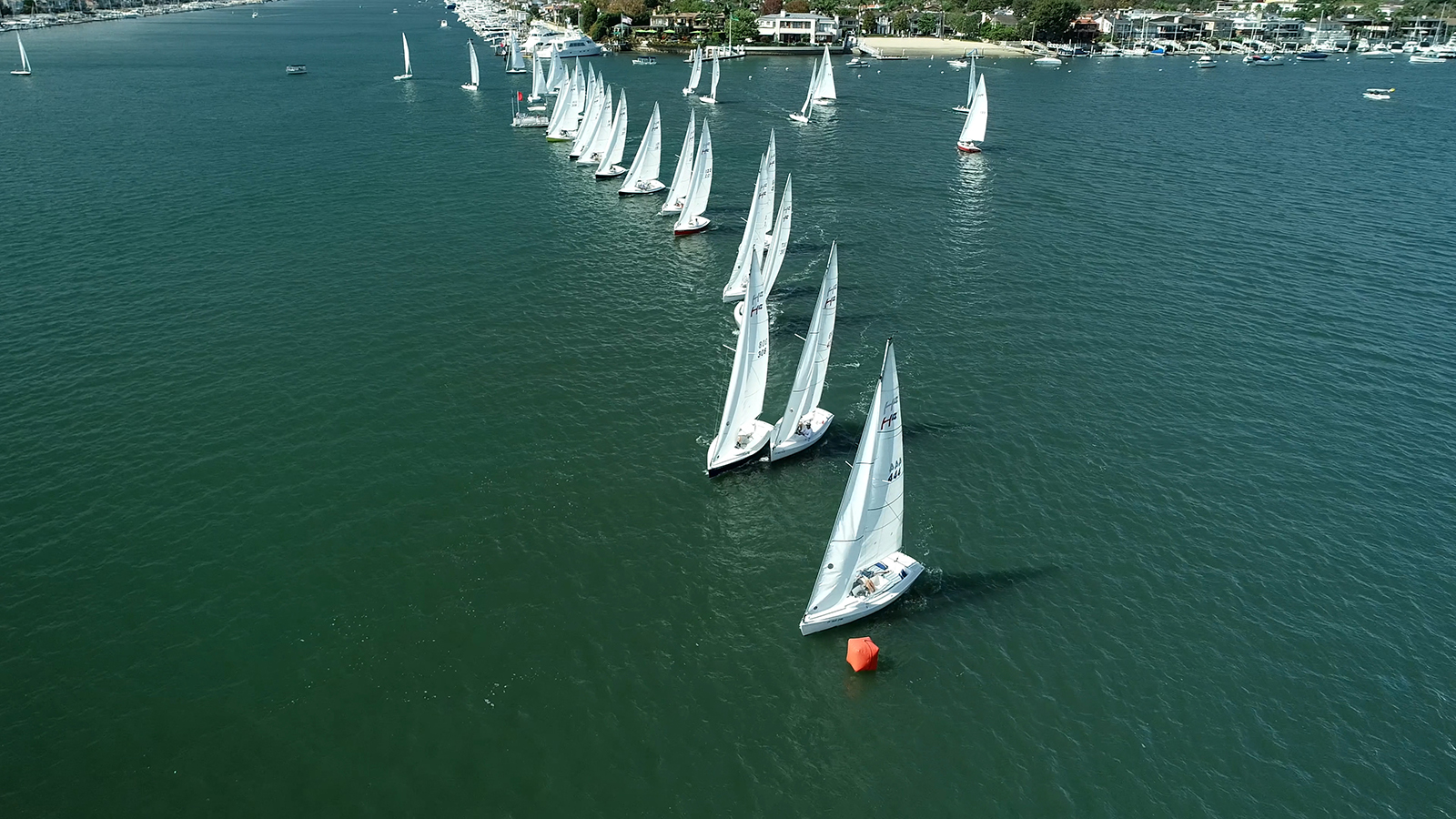
Harbor 20 fleet

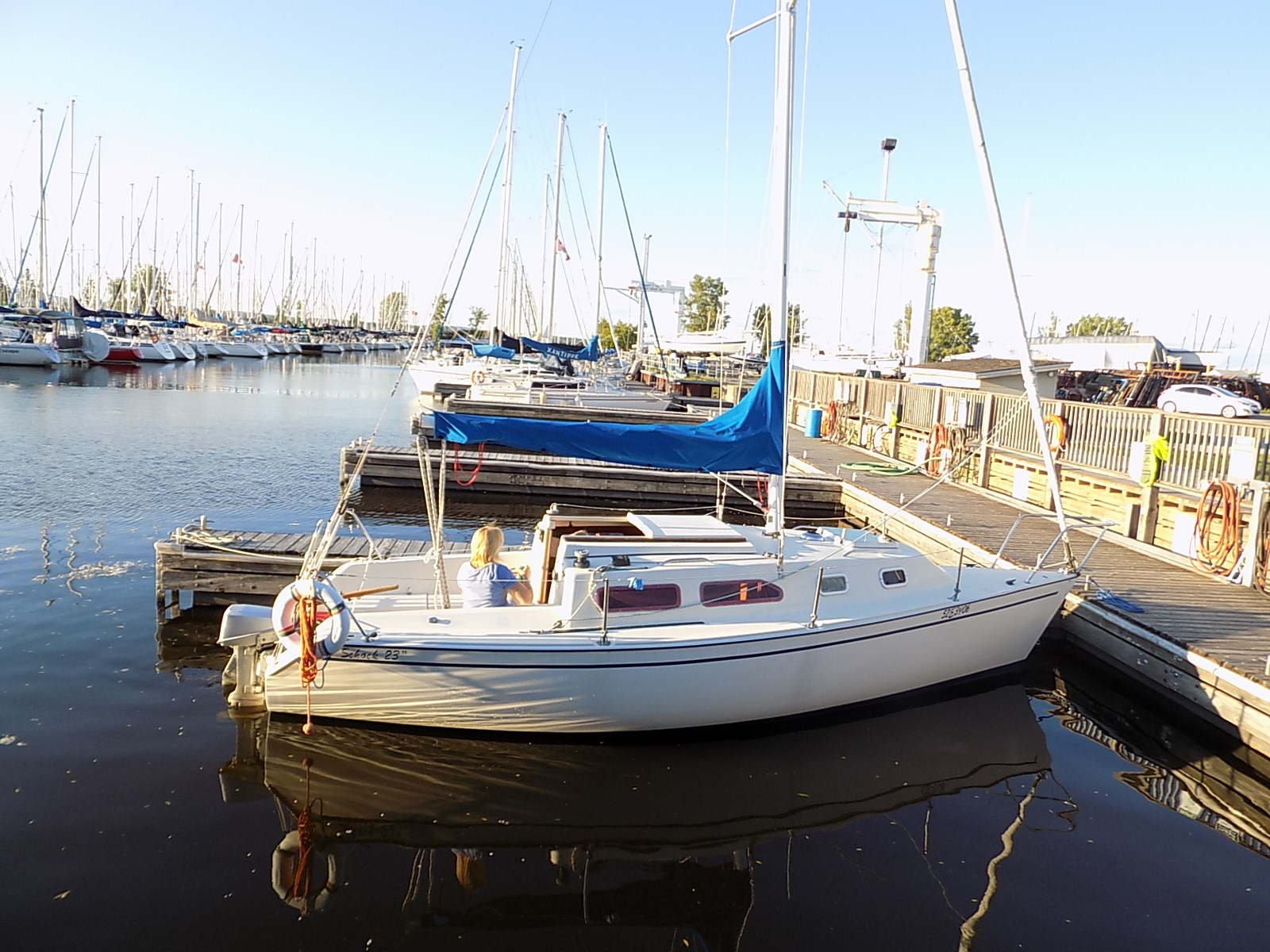
Schock 23

Summary of boats built by W. D. Schock Corp:

- Capri 14
- Catalina Catamaran
- Endeavor 26
- Finn
- Harbor 14
- Harbor 20
- Harbor 25
- Harbor 30
- International 14
- International 110
- International FJ
- Lehman 10
- Lehman 12
- Lehman Interclub
- Lido 14
- El Toro
- Mercury 18
- Metcalf
- Naples Sabot
- New York 36
- Penguin
- Polynesian Concept
- Santana 20
- Santana 2023A
- Santana 2023C
- Santana 2023R
- Santana 21
- Santana 22
- Santana 228
- Santana 23 D
- Santana 23 K
- Santana 25-1
- Santana 25-2
- Santana 26
- Santana 27
- Santana 28
- Santana 30/30
- Santana 35
- Santana 37
- Santana 39
- Santana 525
- Schock 22
- Schock 23
- Schock 25
- Schock 34 GP
- Schock 34 PC
- Schock 35
- Schock 40
- Schock 41
- Schock 55
- Snipe
- Snowbird
- Tartan 27
- Thistle
- Twitchell 12
- Ultimate 20
- US Sabot
- Wavelength 24
- Wavelength 30
- Wavelength 35
