= Setanta =

Setanta may refer to:

- Sétanta, the given name of the Irish mythological figure Cú Chulainn
- Setanta College, sports-related higher education, a distance-learning institution based in Ireland
- Setanta Sports, Ireland-based international television sports channel
  - Setanta Sports USA, defunct version of the above that broadcast in the US and Caribbean from 2005–2010
- Setanta Records, record label
- LÉ Setanta, former Irish Naval Service ship
- Setanta Ó hAilpín, Irish sportsman
- Setanta (wasp), a genus of parasitoid wasps

== See also ==
- Satanta
- Setanta GAA (disambiguation)
