= Santana 23 =

US racing and cruising sailboat

Santana 23 D
Development
- Designer: W. Shad Turner
- Location: United States
- Year: 1978
- No. built: 144 (plus 50 fixed keel version)
- Builder: W. D. Schock Corp
- Role: Racer-Cruiser

Boat
- Displacement: 2,600 lb (1,179 kg)
- Draft: 5.25 ft (1.60 m) with keel down

Hull
- Type: monohull
- Construction: fiberglass
- LOA: 23.33 ft (7.11 m)
- LWL: 20.62 ft (6.28 m)
- Beam: 8.83 ft (2.69 m)
- Engine: outboard motor

Hull appendages
- Keel: daggerboard
- Ballast: 1,130 lb (513 kg)
- Rudder: transom-mounted rudder

Rig
- Rig type: Bermuda rig
- I foretriangle height: 30.00 ft (9.14 m)
- J foretriangle base: 8.75 ft (2.67 m)
- P mainsail luff: 29.00 ft (8.84 m)
- E mainsail foot: 10.50 ft (3.20 m)

Sails
- Sailplan: fractional rigged sloop
- Mainsail area: 152.25 sq ft (14.144 m^{2})
- Jib/genoa area: 131.25 sq ft (12.194 m^{2})
- Total sail area: 283.50 sq ft (26.338 m^{2})

Racing
- PHRF: 171

The Santana 23 is a lightweight, 23-foot 4-inch sailboat that was designed by W. Shad Turner and manufactured by W. D. Schock Corp as a "high performance racer" and trailerable cruiser. It was first built in 1978 and remained in production through 1987, with a total of 194 units produced, though the hull was brought back in 1993 as the Santana 2023. It was produced through 1984 as the Santana 23 "D" (for "daggerboard") model, commonly called the Santana 23D, with a retractable, vertical, daggerboard keel similar to racing dinghys, with a remaining 50 produced through 1987 with a traditional keel, called the Santana 23K. The hull was also used to inspire the Wavelength 24 also by Schrock, and supposedly "many other models."

== Design ==
The 23 was initially designed as a recreational daggerboard boat, built predominantly of fiberglass with a balsawood core designed to reduce weight. It has a raked stem plumb stem, a semi-cut-down vertical transom. For the final three years of production, the boat was modified to use a traditional keel.

The Santana 23 is an Ultra Low Displacement Boat, made popular in the 1970s and 1980s in racing fleets, and was Schrock's attempt for one-design racing that never fully-materialized. It initially had a lead ballast of 1170 lbs (of which only 170lbs of which were in the daggerboard keel) and a hull weight of only approximately 1500 lbs for the boat itself. From Schrock's marketing brochure on the Santana 23:

"The daggerboard is 170lbs. of lead encased in high density foam and fiberglass. The ballast is relatively light by design because of the self-righting characteristics of the boat."

In 1994, the hull was brought back by W.D. Schrock in a redesigned model called the Santana 2023, using the original production's daggerboard design but with a water ballast tank, to reduce weight further than the original 23 models while trailering, and to compete in sales with popular water-ballast models from MacGregor and Catalina. The "R" racing version of the 2023 has a similar PHRF rating as the fairly-fast original 23D that was designed to compete with trailerable racer-cruisers like the J/24, Merit 25, Capri 25, and others.

Particularly in areas where water levels vary, and due to the boat's ability to beach with the retractable keel all-the-way in rather than in a keel housing like most centerboard keelboats, the 23D has a strong reputation and retains high resale value, similar to the cult-like following of the S2 7.9 which also has a vertical daggerboard design. The boat is also designed to plane on the water downwind with the keel up, similar to the Hobie 33. The mainsheet traveler is cockpit-mounted, and the deck-stepped mast has double-spreaders.

The design has a PHRF racing average handicap of 171 and a hull speed of 6.1 kn (11.3 km/h).

The cabin has sleeping accommodation for four people, with a double "V"-berth in the bow cabin and two, 7' settee berths in the main cabin that reach under the helm to seem like large quarterberths though the entire aft cabin area is open and accessible, separate from the wet locker in the rear of the boat. The galley has a sink, drawer, and counter, and is used as a step to enter the cabin. Cabin headroom is 52 in (132 cm). and the walls are lined with a thin carpet, allowing the cabin to be comfortable and usable for a low-deck-height racing boat.

The boat is normally fitted with a small 3 to 6 hp (2 to 4 kW) outboard motor for docking and maneuvering and to keep weight down.

== Variants ==
Santana 23 D
The "drop keel" model was introduced in 1978 and built until 1984, with a total 144 boats completed, with the vast majority, well over 100, produced in 1980 and 1981. It has a fractional sloop rig; a transom-hung, floating auto-lifting rudder controlled by a tiller that is designed to be at optimal height by float height, though is manually adjustable via use of a pin system and/or plastic shims. The length overall is 23.33 ft (7.1 m), with a waterline length of 20.62 ft (6.3 m). It displaces 2,600 lb (1,179 kg) and carries 1,130 lb (513 kg) of ballast, 170 lb (77 kg) of which is the keel weight. The boat has a draft of 5.25 ft (1.60 m) with the keel down and 0.83 ft (0.25 m) with the keel up. Somewhere around hull number 85, Schrock moved the keel-truck back 4" to reduce transmitted weather helm to the helmsman, though common modifications include a Genoa to achieve the same effect.
Santana 23 K
This "fixed keel" model was produced from 1984-1987, with 50 boats built. It has a masthead sloop rig, an internally mounted spade-type rudder controlled by a tiller and a fixed fin keel. The length overall is 23.33 ft (7.1 m), with a waterline length of 20.62 ft (6.3 m). It displaces 2,450 lb (1,111 kg) and carries 1,100 lb (499 kg) of ballast. The boat has a draft of 4.50 ft (1.37 m) with the standard keel.

Santana 2023
The hull design was adopted again in the early 1990's by W.D. Schrock as the Santana 2023. These models have water ballast tanks and are considerably different, though the racing version of these boats performs similarly to the original Santana 23 design. The 2023 version is condidered less-durable than the original design mostly due to ballast tank leaks that were reported in the 1990s. Popular modifications include repairing the ballast or eliminating it all-together and to place 1000 lbs of lead, similar to the original design of the 23D.

== Reception ==
In a 2010 review Steve Henkel wrote, "best features: A comparison of statistics with her comp[etitor], the San Juan 23, shows that the Santana 23 (either the K or D version), despite similar ballast and displacement figures, is (like the Wavelength 24) more of a serious racing boat. The Santana's PHRF, for example, is 63 seconds-per-mile faster than the San Juan 23. She also has the highest Space Index. Worst features: The hull is built light (weight excluding ballast is under 1,500 pounds), so you need to be careful to avoid damage."

== See also ==
- Brochure and Race-Tuning Tips for Santana 23, from Schrock
- Wavelength 24
- Santana 2023
- W.D. Schrock Corporation
- List of sailing boat types
