= Santana 2023 =

1990s US trailer sailer

Santana 2023A
Development
- Designer: Steve Schock
- Location: United States
- Year: 1993
- Builder: W. D. Schock Corp
- Role: Cruiser
- Name: Santana 2023A

Boat
- Displacement: 2,880 lb (1,306 kg)
- Draft: 5.33 ft (1.62 m) with centreboard down

Hull
- Type: monohull
- Construction: fiberglass
- LOA: 23.33 ft (7.11 m)
- LWL: 20.62 ft (6.28 m)
- Beam: 8.50 ft (2.59 m)
- Engine: outboard motor

Hull appendages
- Keel: centerboard
- Ballast: 1,300 lb (590 kg) of water
- Rudder: transom-mounted rudder

Rig
- Rig type: Bermuda rig

Sails
- Sailplan: fractional rigged sloop
- Total sail area: 234.00 sq ft (21.739 m^{2})

Racing
- PHRF: 224

The Santana 2023 is a family of American trailerable sailboats that was designed by Steve Schock, with models for racing and cruising, first built in 1993.

The Santana 2023 is a development of W. Shad Turner's 1978 Santana 23 D design, using the same hull design, but different deck, mast and interior.

== Production ==
The design was built by W. D. Schock Corp in the United States from 1993 until 2001, but it is now out of production.

== Design ==
The Santana 2023 is a recreational keelboat, built predominantly of fiberglass that was built in three different models: A, C and R.

All models have fractional rigs; raked stems; two-angled, open reverse transoms; transom-hung rudders controlled by a tiller and retractable centerboards.

The boat has a draft of 5.33 ft (1.62 m) with the centerboard extended and 1.17 ft (0.36 m) with it retracted, allowing operation in shallow water, beaching or ground transportation on a trailer.

The boat is normally fitted with a small 3 to 6 hp (2 to 4 kW) outboard motor for docking and maneuvering.

== Variants ==
Santana 2023A
This "standard cabin" model has no mast backstay. It displaces 2,880 lb (1,306 kg) and carries 1,300 lb (590 kg) of flooding water ballast, which is drained for road transport. The A model has mainsail boom roller furling. It has a PHRF racing average handicap of 224.
Santana 2023C
This extended coach house "cruising cabin" model has additional headroom and ports and has no mast backstay. It displaces 2,880 lb (1,306 kg) and carries 1,300 lb (590 kg) of flooding water ballast, which is drained for road transport. The C model has mainsail boom roller furling. The design has sleeping accommodation for four people, with a double "V"-berth in the bow cabin and an aft cabin with a double berth. The galley is located on the starboard side just aft of the bow cabin. The galley is equipped with a single-burner stove, an ice box and a sink. The enclosed head is located on the port side, opposite the galley. Cabin headroom is 56 in (142 cm). The boat has a PHRF racing average handicap of 228.
Santana 2023R
This "racing" model has a 3.00 ft (0.91 m) taller rig of a lighter design, a backstay, a longer cockpit and small cabin and may be equipped with an asymmetrical spinnaker flown from a retractable bowsprit. It also has a 1/2" Divinicell cored hull and deck to reduce weight. Consequently, the boat is about 250 lb (113 kg) lighter than the A and C models, with a displacement of about 2,630 lb (1,193 kg). The boat has a PHRF racing average handicap of 174.

== Operational history ==
In a 1996 review in Practical Sailor while the boat was in production, Darrell Nicholson wrote, "we think the Santana 2023 is a reasonable introduction to cruising lakes and protected waters. Its simple operation should not confound beginners or those stepping up from daysailing. Though the design of the 2023 is not as radical or sophisticated as other sprit boats such as the Melges 24 or Ultimate 20, the hull is well designed. It is easy to rig and launch. While early models suffered gear failures, Schock appears to be working out the bugs. Still, we are dismayed that at least one customers warranty work has not been completed."

In a 2010 review Steve Henkel wrote, "best features: It is said to be extremely easy to launch and rig the boat for sailing. Worst features: Judging from owner comments, Schock used plywood on the interior of the water ballast tanks on early boats, then turned to fiberglass starting in 1996. However, they continued to use a brittle caulking material for the joints around the top of the tank, which has often led to leaks. Owners have devised various fixes; none sounds easy to accomplish."

== See also ==
- List of sailing boat types
