= Tacima =

Coordinates: 6°29′16″S 35°38′13″W

Tacima Campo de Santana
- Municipality
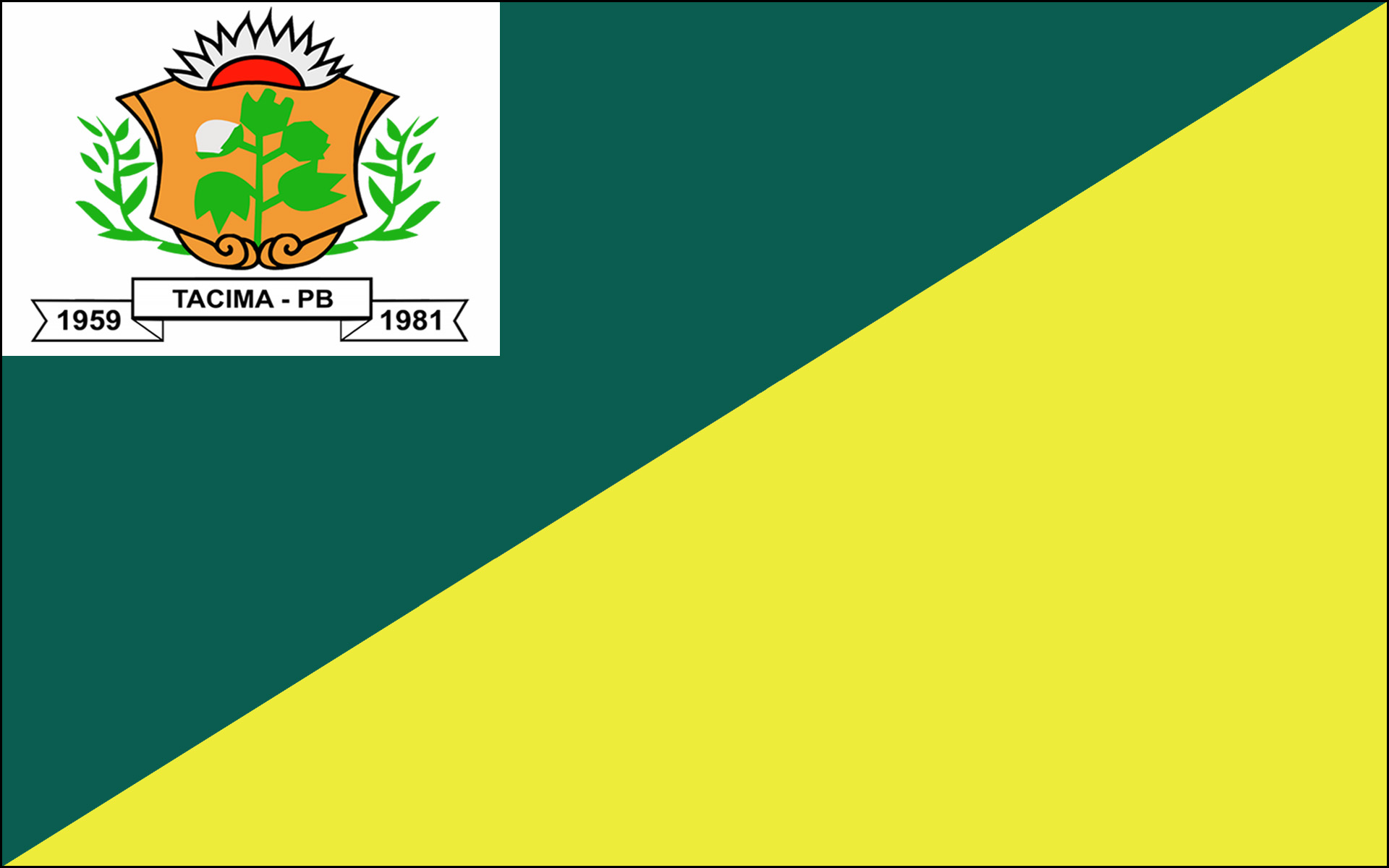
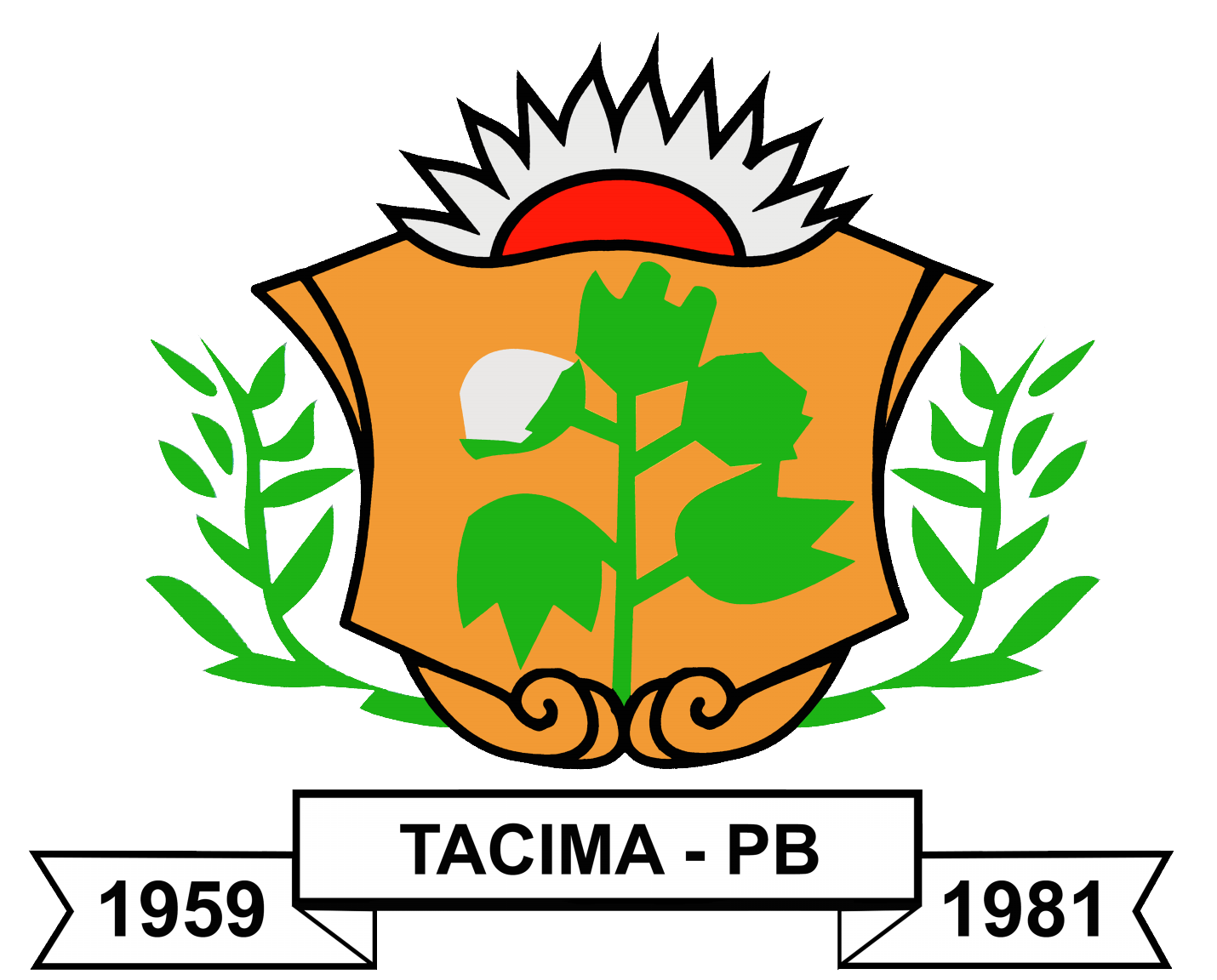
- Flag Coat of arms
- Interactive map of Tacima
- Country: Brazil
- Region: Northeast
- State: Paraíba
- Mesoregion: Agreste Paraibano

Population (2020)
  - Total: 10,969
- Time zone: UTC−3 (BRT)

Tacima (Central northeastern portuguese pronunciation: [tɐˈsimɐ]) (formerly Campo de Santana) is a municipality in the state of Paraíba in the Northeast Region of Brazil.

== History ==
The municipality of Tacima was officially known as Campo de Santana from 1996 to 2009. There is still a district of the municipality with the name Campo de Santana.

== See also ==
- List of municipalities in Paraíba
