= Bruce Nelson (naval architect) =

American naval architect

Bruce Nelson is a Naval Architect who specializes in high-performance yacht design, and who has competed as a sportsman at the upper echelons in his chosen field.

== Biography ==
Nelson is a University of Michigan graduate in Naval Architecture. He won the 1972 Sloop National Championship at college. He has been most notable as a principal yacht designer for the America's Cup contenders and America One challenge. Nelson is a veteran America's Cup racer as well as a designer, he teamed with Dennis Conner on three Stars & Stripes boats (12-meter, catamaran, and IACC) from 1985 to 1995 as both a racer and designer. In 1995, he was the principal designer for the PACT 95 defense syndicate yacht Young America, which was ultimately chosen to be the defender.

Nelson is also an Etchells 22 sailor of some note, having won many local regattas in the San Diego fleet at the National level.

Bruce Nelson and Bruce Marek were the principals of a prolific San Diego California yacht design team, Nelson Marek, formed in 1979. Their first custom design was the incredibly successful One Ton class RUSH. Built in just 72 days, and launched 3 hours before the San Diego Yachting Cup, it lived up to its name. It was the most successful racing yacht in the U.S. in 1980 winning 21 races including the North American One Ton, Chicago Yacht Club Race to Mackinac, Port Huron to Mackinac Boat Race, and Great Lakes champion. Nelson continues to operate Nelson Marek, while Marek is an independent designer on the East Coast. Most of their designs are for custom-built yachts including world-class racers, although they have designed some production models including the Catalina 42 hull and the Merit 28.

One of the more interesting stories is the Catalina 42, the hull of which was originally designed as a limited production ocean racer. Catalina Yachts which at the time produced mostly smaller yachts 30-foot (9.1 m) and under, acquired the rights to produce the Nelson-Marek designed hull in the late 1980s. Designer Gerry Douglas modified the hull to accept a higher cabin top and cruiser-style cabin—the result was Catalina's largest sized offering for many years, with roughly 1,000 hulls on the water.

== America's Cup participation ==
- 1985–1987 – Stars & Stripes 83, Stars & Stripes 85, Stars & Stripes 86, Stars & Stripes 87 (12 m), Dennis Conner
- 1988–1990 – Stars & Stripes (catamaran), Dennis Conner
- 1991–1992 – Stars & Stripes (IACC), Dennis Conner
- 1993–1995 – Young America, PACT 95
- 199?–2000 – America One, Paul Cayard

== IOR designs ==
- Crackerjack
- Electra
- Sleeper
- Reliance
- Ragtime
- Cowboy (NOT an IOR design. It was a MORC boat.)
- Infinity
- Stars & Stripes
- Rowdy (NOT an N/M design. It is a Peterson Designed Contessa 39)
- Lonestar
- Renegade

== Producers of Nelson – Marek Designs ==
- Catalina Yachts
- Martin Yachts Vancouver, BC
- Merit Yachts
- Morgan Yachts
- Salthouse Brothers, New Zealand
- U.S. Watercraft
- W.D. Schock
- Carroll Marine

== Production models ==
- Nelson – Marek 30
- 1D 35
- CM 1200
- Nelson – Marek 36
- Nelson – Marek 41
- Nelson – Marek 43
- Nelson – Marek 45
- Nelson - Marek 46
- Nelson Marek 52 Ptarmigan
- Nelson Marek 55 BOLT née Lone Star
- Catalina 42
- Merit 28
- Santana 30/30
- Schock 34 Grand Prix
