= Interclub Dinghy =

Sailboat class

- IC Class symbol

Development
- Designer: Sparkman & Stephens
- Location: United States
- Year: 1946
- No. built: 1200
- Builders: Zephyr Boat Company, Dodson Plastic Corp, O'Day Corp
- Role: One-design Racer
- Name: Interclub Dinghy

Boat
- Crew: 2
- Displacement: 150 lb (68 kg)
- Draft: 3.00 ft (0.91 m), centerboard down

Hull
- Type: Monohull
- Construction: Fiberglass or wood
- LOA: 11.50 ft (3.51 m)
- LWL: 11.50 ft (3.51 m)
- Beam: 4.58 ft (1.40 m)

Hull appendages
- Keel: centerboard
- Rudder: transom-mounted rudder

Rig
- Rig type: Cat rig

Sails
- Sailplan: Catboat
- Mainsail area: 72.00 sq ft (6.689 m^{2})
- Total sail area: 72.00 sq ft (6.689 m^{2})

The Interclub Dinghy is an American sailing dinghy that was designed by Sparkman & Stephens as a one-design racer and first built in 1946. It is sailed in frostbite racing on the US east coast, particularly on Long Island Sound. Frostbite races are the series held after the normal sailing season is finished.

== Production ==
The design was sponsored by the Larchmont Yacht Club and initially built by the Zephyr Boat Company, with the hull made from molded plywood. It was later built by the Dodson Plastic Corp from fiberglass and marketed by the O'Day Corp in the United States. A total of 1200 examples of the type were completed.

When it was in production the boat could be purchased as a bare hull, with the centerboard, rudder, tiller and spars purchased separately. The mast and boom were also available as "blanks" for finishing. A launching dolly was a factory option.

== Design ==
The Interclub Dinghy is a recreational sailboat, built predominantly of fiberglass or wood. It has a loose-footed catboat single sail rig with aluminum spars, a plumb stem, a plumb transom, a transom-hung rudder controlled by a tiller and a retractable centerboard. It displaces 150 lb (68 kg) and is raced with a crew of one or two sailors.

The boat has a draft of 3.00 ft (0.91 m) with the centerboard extended and 0.20 ft (0.061 m) with it retracted, allowing beaching or ground transportation on a trailer or car roof rack.

For sailing the design is equipped with an adjustable forestay and fixed shrouds, a 2:1 mechanical advantage Cunningham, a 10:1 boom vang and an internally-mounted outhaul.

== Operational history ==
In 2020 there were eight fleets, located at the Severn Sailing Association in Annapolis, Maryland, the Hyannis Yacht Club in Massachusetts, the Indian Harbor Yacht Club in Greenwich, Connecticut, the Larchmont Yacht Club in Larchmont, New York, the Metedeconk River Yacht Club in New Jersey, the Manhasset Bay Yacht Club in New York state, the Rochester Frostbite Association in Rochester, New York and the Winthrop Frostbite Sailing Club in Massachusetts.

== See also ==
- List of sailing boat types

Similar sailboats

- Cape Cod Frosty
- Lehman Interclub
- Penguin (dinghy)
