= Lehman Interclub =

Sailboat class

Development
- Designer: Barney Lehman
- Location: United States
- Year: 1948
- Builders: PlastiGlass; W. D. Schock Corp
- Role: One design racer
- Name: Lehman Interclub

Boat
- Displacement: 105 lb (48 kg)
- Draft: 3.00 ft (0.91 m)

Hull
- Type: monohull
- Construction: fiberglass
- LOA: 10.25 ft (3.12 m)
- Beam: 4.42 ft (1.35 m) with daggerboard down

Hull appendages
- Keel: daggerboard
- Rudder: transom-mounted rudder

Rig
- Rig type: Catboat

Sails
- Sailplan: cat rigged
- Mainsail area: 67.00 sq ft (6.225 m^{2})
- Total sail area: 67.00 sq ft (6.225 m^{2})

The Lehman Interclub, also called the Lehman 10, is an American sailboat that was designed by Barney Lehman as a one design racer and first built in 1958.

== Production ==
The design was initially built by Barney Lehman and then by his company PlastiGlass in the United States, starting in 1948. It was also built by W. D. Schock Corp, starting in 1956, after buying out PlasticGlass, but it is now out of production.

== Design ==
The Lehman Interclub is a racing sailing dinghy, built predominantly of fiberglass, with wood trim. It has a stayed catboat rig, a plumb stem and transom, a transom-hung rudder controlled by a tiller and a retractable daggerboard. It displaces 105 lb (48 kg).

The boat has a draft of 3.00 ft (0.91 m) with the daggerboard extended and 4 in (10 cm) with it retracted, allowing operation in shallow water, beaching or ground transportation on a trailer or car roof.

== Operational history ==
The design was used for a US-Mexico regatta that was held in Acapulco in February, 1952 and which included sponsorship from the Mexican government.

The August 1963 issue of Motor Boating and Sailing noted that the boat was being "widely used for intercollegiate racing" on the American west coast at that time.

== See also ==
- List of sailing boat types

Related development

- Lehman 12

Similar sailboats

- Interclub Dinghy
