= Harbor 14 =

Sailboat class

Development
- Designer: Barney Lehman and W. D. Schock
- Location: United States
- Year: 2004
- Builder: W. D. Schock Corp
- Role: Day sailer

Boat
- Displacement: 525 lb (238 kg)
- Draft: 2.16 ft (0.66 m)

Hull
- Type: monohull
- Construction: fiberglass
- LOA: 14.00 ft (4.27 m)
- Beam: 6.00 ft (1.83 m)

Hull appendages
- Keel: fin keel
- Ballast: 250 lb (113 kg)
- Rudder: transom-mounted rudder

Rig
- Rig type: Bermuda rig

Sails
- Sailplan: fractional rigged sloop
- Total sail area: 110.00 sq ft (10.219 m^{2})

The Harbor 14 is an American trailerable sailboat that was designed by Barney Lehman and William D. Schock as a day sailer and first built in 2004.

The Harbor 14 is an updated development of the 1960 Capri 14 keelboat, which was, in turn, derived from the 1958 Lido 14 sailing dinghy.

== Production ==
The design was built by W. D. Schock Corp in the United States, starting in 2004, but it is now out of production.

== Design ==
The Harbor 14 is a recreational keelboat, built predominantly of fiberglass, with wooden trim. It displaces 525 lb (238 kg) and carries 250 lb (113 kg) of ballast.

It has a fractional sloop rig, a spooned raked stem, an angled transom, a transom-hung rudder controlled by a tiller with an extension and a fixed fin keel. The foredeck is covered and the boat has a long cockpit.

The boat has a draft of 2.16 ft (0.66 m) when equipped with the standard keel.

== See also ==
- List of sailing boat types

Related development

- Capri 14
- Lido 14
