= Capri 14 =

Sailboat class

Development
- Designer: Barney Lehman and W. D. Schock
- Location: United States
- Year: 1960
- Builder: W. D. Schock Corp
- Role: Day sailer
- Name: Capri 14

Boat
- Displacement: 525 lb (238 kg)
- Draft: 2.16 ft (0.66 m)

Hull
- Type: monohull
- Construction: fiberglass
- LOA: 14.00 ft (4.27 m)
- Beam: 6.00 ft (1.83 m)

Hull appendages
- Keel: fin keel
- Ballast: 250 lb (113 kg)
- Rudder: transom-mounted rudder

Rig
- Rig type: Bermuda rig

Sails
- Sailplan: fractional rigged sloop
- Total sail area: 110.00 sq ft (10.219 m^{2})

The Capri 14 is an American trailerable sailboat that was designed by Barney Lehman and W. D. Schock as a day sailer and first built in 1960.

The Capri 14 is a fixed keel development of the 1958 centerboard Lido 14 sailing dinghy and was developed into the Harbor 14 in 2004.

== Production ==
The design was built by W. D. Schock Corp in the United States, starting in 1960, but it is now out of production.

== Design ==
The Capri 14 is a recreational keelboat, built predominantly of fiberglass, with wood trim. It has a fractional sloop rig, a spooned raked stem, an angled transom, a transom-hung rudder controlled by a tiller and a fixed fin keel. It displaces 525 lb (238 kg) and carries 250 lb (113 kg) of ballast.

The boat has a draft of 2.16 ft (0.66 m) with the standard keel.

== See also ==
- List of sailing boat types
