= Lehman 12 =

Sailboat class

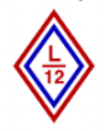

Development
- Designer: Barney Lehman
- Location: United States
- Year: 1953
- No. built: 400
- Builders: PlastiGlass; W. D. Schock Corp
- Role: Sailing dinghy

Boat
- Displacement: 175 lb (79 kg)
- Draft: 2.00 ft (0.61 m) with daggerboard down

Hull
- Type: monohull
- Construction: fiberglass
- LOA: 12.00 ft (3.66 m)
- Beam: 4.50 ft (1.37 m)

Hull appendages
- Keel: Daggerboard
- Rudder: transom-mounted rudder

Rig
- Rig type: Cat rig

Sails
- Sailplan: Catboat
- Mainsail area: 81.00 sq ft (7.525 m^{2})
- Total sail area: 81.00 sq ft (7.525 m^{2})

The Lehman 12 is an American sailboat that was designed by Barney Lehman as a one design racing sailing dinghy and first built in 1953.

== Production ==
The design was first built by Lehman's own company, PlastiGlass founded in 1950 on the United States west coast. It was one of the first production boats to be built from fiberglass, a new material then. W. D. Schock Corp purchased PlastiGlass in 1955 and continued production of the boat design for a number of years, but it is now out of production. The Lehman 12 design led to a slightly larger boat, the Lehman 14 which, in turn, led to the highly successful Lido 14.

A total of 400 Lehman 12s were built.

== Design ==
The Lehman 12 is a recreational planing sailing dinghy, built predominantly of fiberglass, with mahogany and oak wood trim. It has a loose-footed catboat rig, a plumb stem and transom, a transom-hung rudder controlled by a tiller and a retractable daggerboard. It displaces 175 lb (79 kg) and has positive flotation buoyancy tanks, making the boat unsinkable.

The boat has a draft of 2.00 ft (0.61 m) with the daggerboard extended and 3 in (7.6 cm) with it retracted, allowing operation in shallow water, beaching or ground transportation on a trailer or car roof.

In 1998 W. D. Schock Corp carried out a redesign of the boat, as part of their program of modernizing many models in their product line, to simplify production and also maintenance for owners. The changes were made in consultation with the class association and the new design complies with class one design rules. The wood that had been used for the rails, thwarts, flotation tanks and other components was replaced with fiberglass, thus eliminating requirements for varnishing and reducing weight. The wooden tiller was replaced with aluminum. The new hull also incorporates flared hiking rails and structural strengthening stringers.

== Operational history ==
The United States Sailing Association describes the boat, "Lehman 12 Dinghies have been a staple in Southern California one design racing since its inception in 1953. Lehman 12s are very responsive to weight, trim, and steering making it a challenging and competitive class. The Lehman 12 class is still one of the most active racing dinghy classes in Southern California."

Ullman Sails says, "the Lehman 12 is an exceptionally responsive two-man planing dinghy that quietly glides through the water with only a whisper of wind. It is a daggerboard boat with a loose-fitted cat rig and a deep rudder. The simple, uncomplicated design of the Lehman 12 makes it great for the husband-and-wife team."

== See also ==
- List of sailing boat types
