= Sanderling 18 =

US gaff-rigged catboat

Development
- Designer: Breckenridge Marshall
- Location: United States
- Year: 1962
- Builder: Marshall Marine Corporation
- Role: Day sailer-cruiser

Boat
- Displacement: 2,200 lb (998 kg)
- Draft: 4.33 ft (1.32 m) with centerboard down

Hull
- Type: monohull
- Construction: fiberglass
- LOA: 18.17 ft (5.54 m)
- LWL: 17.00 ft (5.18 m)
- Beam: 8.50 ft (2.59 m)
- Engine: Yanmar 1GM diesel engine

Hull appendages
- Keel: fixed keel and centerboard
- Ballast: 500 lb (227 kg)
- Rudder: transom-mounted rudder

Rig
- Rig type: gaff-rigged catboat

Sails
- Sailplan: catboat
- Mainsail area: 253.00 sq ft (23.504 m^{2})
- Total sail area: 253.00 sq ft (23.504 m^{2})

Rating
- PHRF: 315

The Sanderling 18, also called the 18' Sanderling, Marshall Sanderling and just the Sanderling, is a recreational gaff-rigged catboat first built in 1962. It is named for the shore bird. The Sanderling 18 is a development of a 1941 Pop Arnold catboat design.

== Production ==
The design was the first boat produced by Marshall Marine Corporation in South Dartmouth, Massachusetts, United States. It has been in continuous production since 1962 and remains in production.

== Design ==
The Sanderling 18 is built predominantly of fiberglass, with wood trim. It is a gaff-rigged catboat with a wide beam, a plumb stem, a vertical transom, a transom-hung "barn-door" rudder controlled by a tiller and an unballasted retractable centerboard. Typical of catboats, there is no keel, but there is a substantial skeg, to which the bottom of the rudder is mounted.

The design is built in daysailor and cuddy cabin versions. The latter has sleeping accommodation for two people, with a double "V"-berth in the cabin around a drop-leaf table. The galley is located on both sides of the companionway ladder. The galley may be equipped with a stove to port and a counter to starboard. .

== Dimensions ==
The hull is 18 feet long (5.49 m) not including the rudder, and has a beam (width) of 8.5 feet (2.6m)

The boat displaces 2,200 lb (998 kg) and carries 500 lb (227 kg) of lead pig ballast in the bilges. The boat has a draft of 4.33 ft (1.32 m) with the centerboard extended and 1.58 ft (0.48 m) with it retracted, allowing operation in shallow water, beaching or ground transportation on a trailer.

Cabin headroom is 43 in (109 cm)

The boat may be fitted with a small 4 to 6 hp (3 to 4 kW) outboard motor or, optionally, a Japanese Yanmar 1GM10 diesel engine for docking and maneuvering.

The design has a PHRF racing average handicap of 315 and a hull speed of 5.6 kn (10.4 km/h).

== Reception ==
In a Maine Boats review Stephen Rappaport wrote, "with his design of the company’s 18-foot fiberglass Sanderling in the early 1960s, Marshall was largely responsible for the resurgence of interest in catboats among sailors without the wherewithal, financial, emotional or otherwise, to restore one of the handful of available wooden classics."

A 2008 Small Craft Advisor review noted, "there is a temptation to call a classic catboat like Sanderling 'simple' and 'effortless,' but for her many strengths, ease-of-use and simplicity might not be the most notable. Weather helm can be a handful, and jibing sometimes nerve-wracking. The Sanderling’s series of blocks, halyards, eyestraps and hoops will take the newcomer some time. And while there’s only one sail to think about-at 253 sq. ft.- it's a lot to think about; what author Tony Gibbs calls 'the ever-present question of reefing.'"

In a 2010 review Steve Henkel wrote, "this salty-looking vessel is one of the longest running fiberglass designs around. Its still selling well after almost 50 years on the market. Best features: The basic design is virtually unchanged from the earliest production boats, which means that there are many used boats to choose from. You may be able to pick up an older boat for only a few thousand dollars—or pay mid-five-figures or more for a new boat loaded with extras. Under sail the Sanderling is relatively fast, stiff, well-balanced, and forgiving. Construction is solid if somewhat plain, at least on older boats, Surprisingly for such a small boat, you have a choice of outboard or Yanmar 1GM inboard. There are quite a few one-design racing and cruising fleets of these boats, mostly in New England and New Jersey. Worst features: Painted wood cockpit seats are open underneath, making stowage of gear easy but leaving it open to the weather. Shelves along the berths below can catch your shoulders when you are lying down and try to turn over. Galley facilities are minimal, and there's no good spot below for a portable cooler. Headroom is only barely adequate for moving around the cabin, and storage below is below average. A forward hatch for better ventilation would be a good idea."

In a 2019 review by Peter Nielsen and Adam Cort in Sail magazine wrote, "the Sanderling is the type of boat that inspires lengthy love affairs with its owners. Who buys them? 'It’s a common theme for someone who has done the big-boat thing to end up with one of our boats,' says co-owner Kristen Marshall. 'They sail and feel like a much bigger boat than they are.'"
