= Woods Hole spritsail boat =

Historic American sailing and rowing craft

A Woods Hole spritsail boat is a small sailing and rowing craft, constructed entirely of wood, and fastened with iron or copper. It was used historically for fishing, island mail deliveries, racing, or day sailing off the coast of southeastern Massachusetts, especially in the waters of Buzzards Bay and Vineyard Sound near the town of Woods Hole, a community of Falmouth in Barnstable County, Massachusetts. Although the sprit sailing rig has ancient roots, the Woods Hole spritsail boats were built and used mainly in the period between the US Civil War and World War I, becoming most prevalent during the late 19th and early 20th centuries. The original boats were employed almost exclusively in fishing, including handlining for finfish, trap fishing for lobster, or digging with tongs for bivalve shellfish, but by the late 19th century, newer and lighter spritsail boats began to be built for recreational sailing and racing. This transition coincided with the emergence of Woods Hole as a summer coastal tourist destination, when the Cape Cod Central Railroad began service from Buzzards Bay in 1872, followed by a private subscription railroad that was extended from Boston in 1884. This spritsail boat has now disappeared as a type, but its cultural significance endures in New England maritime museums, remaining a material symbol of the small community of Woods Hole.

== History ==
The Woods Hole spritsail boat has been cited by historic preservationists and boat-builders alike as illustrative of the transition of small coastal sailing vessels from working boats to pleasure craft during the late 19th century, reflecting clearly a growing societal shift that increasingly substituted leisure for industry. The construction of these boats exemplified practical innovations in wooden boatbuilding, likely evolving from Newport Point boats and conflating the catboat with the whaleboat for application to an often challenging coastal environment. Although these boats fell out of use in the early 20th century, their legacy has been preserved in several museums of maritime history, and they remain a long-standing material symbol of the local Woods Hole community. Described by turns as "handy", "seaworthy", and "shippy", the Woods Hole spritsail boat never achieved the permanence and widespread reputation accorded some of its one-design contemporaries, such as Maine’s North Haven Dinghy (which also started out as a spritsail boat), or its successors, such as the Beetle Cat of Wareham, Massachusetts.

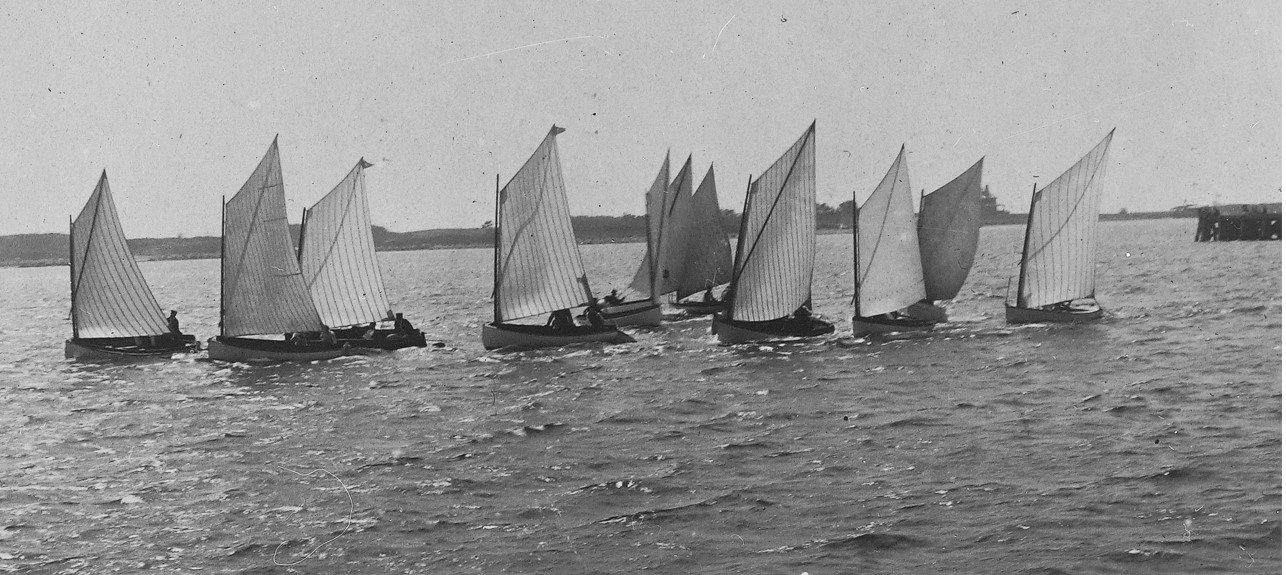
Woods Hole spritsail boats racing off Bar Neck Wharf (circa 1900) in Woods Hole, Massachusetts.

The Woods Hole spritsail boats were constructed by builders ranging from New London, Connecticut to Portland, Maine, but most were built in one of the coastal communities surrounding Buzzards Bay or Vineyard Sound. Some of the most important boat builders from the New England region built Woods Hole spritsail boats, including the Wilton Crosby yard of Osterville, Massachusetts and the Herreshoff Manufacturing Company (HMCo.) of Bristol, Rhode Island. E.E. ("Eddy") Swift of Woods Hole built three spritsail boats (Spy, Susie, and one that was never named), and all three of Swift's builds exist today on active display in the collections of maritime museums. The former was restored by R.H. ("Bob") Baker, and the latter two had been kept in nearly new condition in the basement of a barn in Woods Hole, only to be discovered upon Swift's death in 1964. Charles Eldred of Quissett Harbor was known to have built spritsail boats as well, including Emma (1898), but none are currently known to exist.

Possibly as many as 28 Woods Hole spritsail boats existed at one time, although the cumulative number of these boats that were built over time is unknown. The boats were unnumbered, but most had unique names. Today, only six original boats are known to exist: Old Pal (ca. 1860), Explorer (formerly T.C., standing for either "Tough Cuss" or "Tin Cup" or "Tea Cup") (1890); Spy (1893–94); Susie (1896); an unidentified boat (ca. 1905); and E.E. Swift’s unnamed boat (1913–14). Four replicas were built from 1973 to 2000 following plans or loftings (or both) taken from the originals, and these continue to be used in museum liveries or for recreational sailing. They include Sandy Ford (1972); Nonnamessett (1983); Roberta (1997); and Dewey (2000). Eight of the extant spritsail boats are held in the collections of maritime museums, and only two (Nonnamessett and the unidentified boat) are known to be in private hands. Six sets of plans have been published (T.C. [Explorer], Spy, Susie, Swift’s unnamed boat, Sandy Ford, and Ace of Clubs, the latter drawn from a half model. These plans are maintained in the collection at the Mystic Seaport Museum in Mystic, Connecticut, and, although some contain construction details, most were drawn primarily for research—not construction. Construction drawings are available online for two of the HMCo. builds, including those for Dude and Gee. One set of (unpublished) loftings were taken from Swift's unnamed boat by David Martin for building Nonnamesset (1983), and loftings must have been made for Roberta (1997) and Dewey (2000) as well.

Upon its establishment in 1897, the Woods Hole Yacht Club adopted the spritsail boat as one of its main racing classes—eventually organizing it into two separate classes—and spritsail boats were raced there until at least 1909. Occasional races were sanctioned independently thereafter. Many of the races were said to have involved financial prizes and trophies.

== Construction details ==
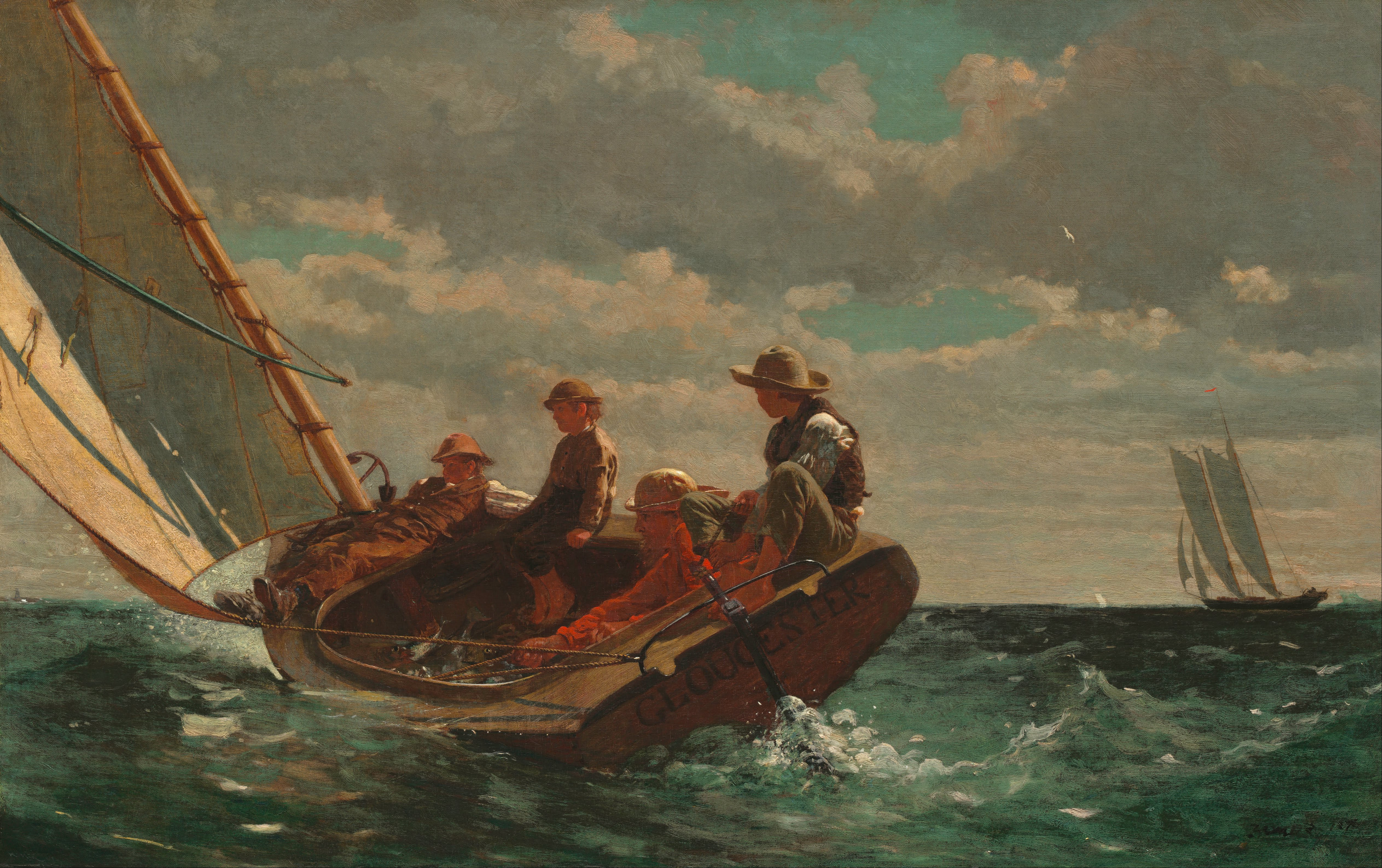
A spritsail rig depicted in Breezing Up (A Fair Wind) Winslow Homer's classic depiction of a catboat

Because the Woods Hole spritsail boat's sailing rig comprises both a single mast located in the bow immediately behind the stem and exhibits an overall length to beam ratio of approximately 2:1, it has been described as a type of or as having evolved from the Cape Cod catboat. (Interestingly, although catboats typically are gaff rigged, the canonical depiction of a “catboat” in the painting “Breezing Up (A Fair Wind)” by Winslow Homer in fact carries a sprit rig. Notably, the sprit rig was the most common rig for small "rowing-sailing" boats through the mid- to late-19th century, giving way only later to gaff and Bermuda rigs.)

Beginning three decades earlier with Little Eva (1853), the six Crosby yards on Cape Cod built many catboats, which had reputations for hefty backbones and scantlings. If Una, designed and built in New Jersey in 1850, is thought to be the original catboat, featuring a single gaff rigged sail mounted forward, the ~2:1 length to beam ratio, and a foredeck, then the catboat’s features that distinguish it from other boat types arguably must have had a significant influence on the development of the Woods Hole spritsail boat. Wilton Crosby’s construction of the Woods Hole spritsail boat T.C. in 1890 further solidifies the catboat legacy.

Notwithstanding the obvious catboat inspiration, experts, including Bob Baker, thought that the spritsail boats may have had a close connection to or have been derived from designs for the older Newport fish and lobster boats (also known as "Point boats"), as exemplified by Button Swan (1870), which was restored by Baker for the Mystic Seaport Museum during the time that he owned the spritsail boat Susie. (With respect more generally to catboats as a legacy too of Newport Point boats, Howard Chapelle argued this connection as well, based upon a sketch drawn for him by Nathanael Herreshoff.) Woods Hole “spritsail boats,” however, never were referred to as “catboats.”

The oldest known Woods Hole spritsail boat, named Old Pal (ca. 1860), was smooth-planked, and it featured the full keel and heavy scantlings characteristic of the working Newport Point boats. Its partial restoration in the mid-20th century involved the replacement of a centerboard with a full keel. Classified as coastal "smack boats", these working craft often were built with live fish wells located in the cockpit behind the centerboard case or, in some cases, they towed an elliptical fish car.

Despite clear influences from earlier Newport Point boats or even the earliest gaff-rigged catboats, many features of the Woods Hole spritsail boat—except most notably its transom—were derived from the construction designs embodied in the typical whaleboat from the region, including carvel planking made of white cedar, frames of white oak jogged over internally cedar-battened seams, lapped sheer strakes, and oak knees that supported cross thwarts and stern seats. Knees also were used to attach the transom to the sheer clamps and between the frames and thwarts and benches located aft.

The earliest working spritsail boats may have been wholly clinker planked, as evidenced by a sales receipt for the building of "one 14ft Lap Work Boat Galv^{d} Fasten^{d}", which was issued by Rogers & Comstock, manufacturer of "Pleasure, Whale, Seal, Yawl, Smack, Surf, and Quarter Boats", of New London, Connecticut, to B.L. Gifford of Woods Hole on February 7, 1879. In contrast, most of the late-19th century Woods Hole spritsail boats were smooth planked, except for the sheer strake, which was lapped over the seventh plank to provide additional strength. The one unidentified boat (ca. 1905) also exhibits the first broad strakes lapping the garboards, a feature characteristic of the construction of whaleboats built by James and Charles Beetle of New Bedford.

Like the method by which whaleboats were built with batten-seams, plank edges may have been left unbeveled, and also there may have been little or no backing-out of the inside of the planks to match the curvatures of the frames. Instead, the planks typically were bent and clamped on molds with pads after steaming and fastened with closely spaced iron or copper clench nails to the seam battens. Frames were let in after planking, jogged over the seam battens, clench-nailed or riveted to the planks, and screwed to the sprung keel or attached to thin flooring running across the top of the keel. Hood and aft plank ends typically were fastened to the stem and transom with straight galvanized iron or copper nails. The replica Sandy Ford, however, which was modeled on the Crosby built Explorer (ex-T.C.), does not exhibit batten seams, and its planking followed the customary process of beveling, backing-out, steaming, bending-on, and fitting.

== Design Features ==
Notwithstanding the inevitable tendency to try to identify the preexisting styles from which a particular class of boat evolved, ultimately design details were driven by local environments. The maritime historian Howard Chapelle claimed that: "[t]he one essential factor in the design of boats proven by history is that they must fit the conditions where they are used and for what they are used." The Woods Hole spritsail boat clearly follows this principle, as its design features were adapted to the breezy winds, choppy seas, rapid currents, and the local embayments and other physical constraints (such as fixed bridges) of Buzzards Bay, Vineyard Sound, and the "holes" (channels) connecting the two.

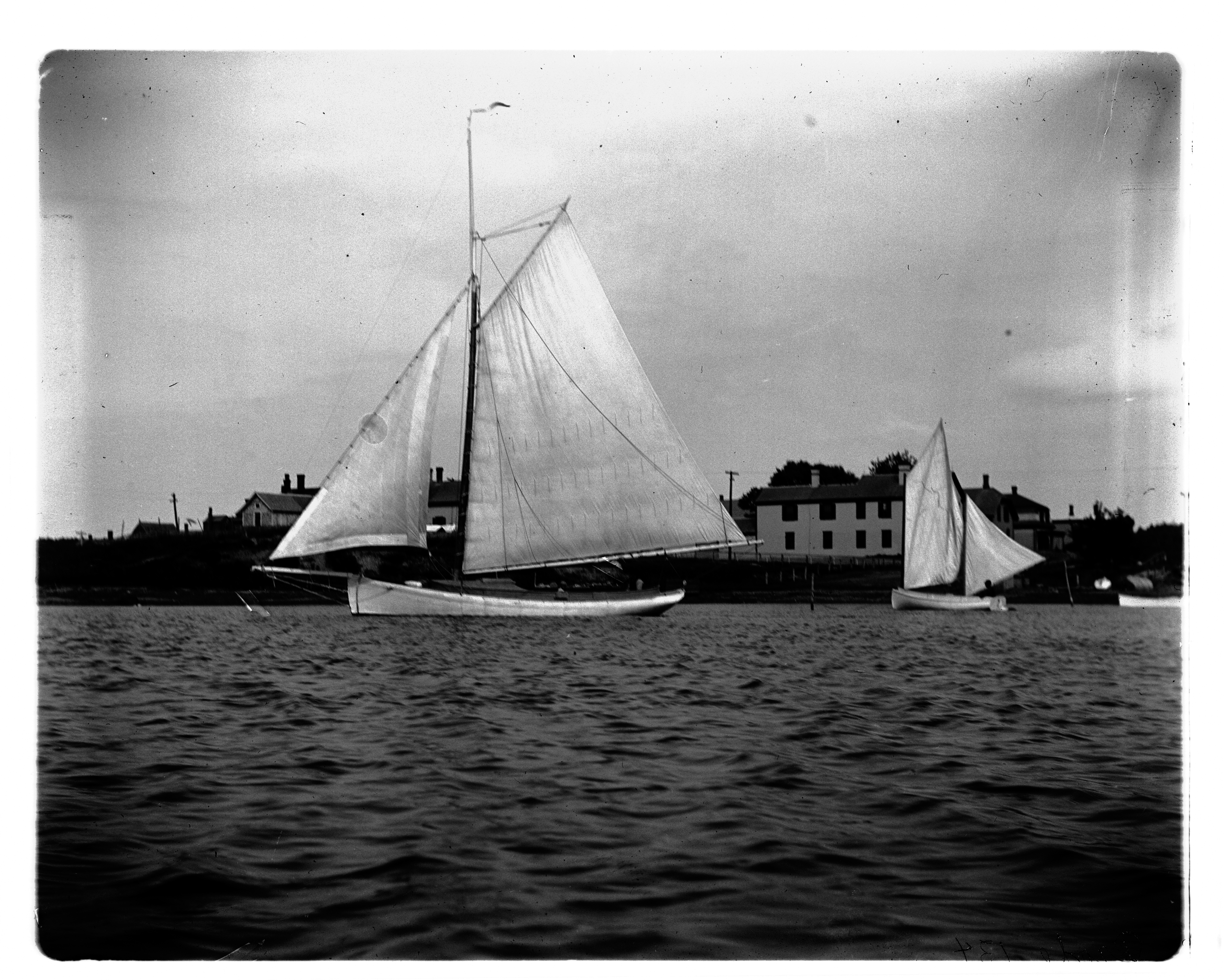
Woods Hole spritsail boat (on the right) in 1894, showing both the sprit-rigged mainsail and a leg-o-mutton mizzen (or "jigger").

The archetypal dimensions of the Woods Hole spritsail boat range from 12–14 feet in length with a beam of 6 feet. This spritsail boat has a tumblehome stem, a broad entrance, a low deadrise, a high sheer, and an elliptical transom. The boat is open, making it feel spacious, with a narrow covering board of 4-6 inches in width, faced on the inside by 4-6 inch-high coaming extending from breasthook to transom. Because the spritsail boat is so open, and despite the relatively high sheer, it can be wet in any kind of sea, and the wide coaming is used to help keep it reasonably dry.

The sailing rig comprises a four-sided sail, fixed in place along the luff to a mast (without a halyard) by lines or occasionally with hoops. Working spritsails also sometimes employed a leg-o-mutton mizzen (also known as a "jigger"), transforming the boat into a small ketch. Early design restrictions developed by the WHYC limited the sail's luff to the overall length of the boat but did not otherwise constrain the sail area. There is neither a boom nor a gaff. The peak of the sail is supported at the end of a wooden spar called a "sprit", which extends down to an adjustable becket (known commonly as a "snotter") fastened to the front of the mast. The clew is attached to one end of the mainsheet, which runs to a block that slides across a traveler made of bronze bar and forward to a cleat on the coaming or under the deck. Spritsail boat sails differed significantly in square footage, they were sailed without battens in the leech, and only a few sails incorporated reef points. Later WHYC sailing rules prohibited the use of battens in the sail (but see in the first figure above the example [second boat from the left] of a sail with three battens). Racing sailors would tie on smaller sails for heavy air instead of putting in a reef, and Herreshoff racing builds included two sizes of hollow masts with two sizes of sails. For light air, some boats were said to have used silk sails.

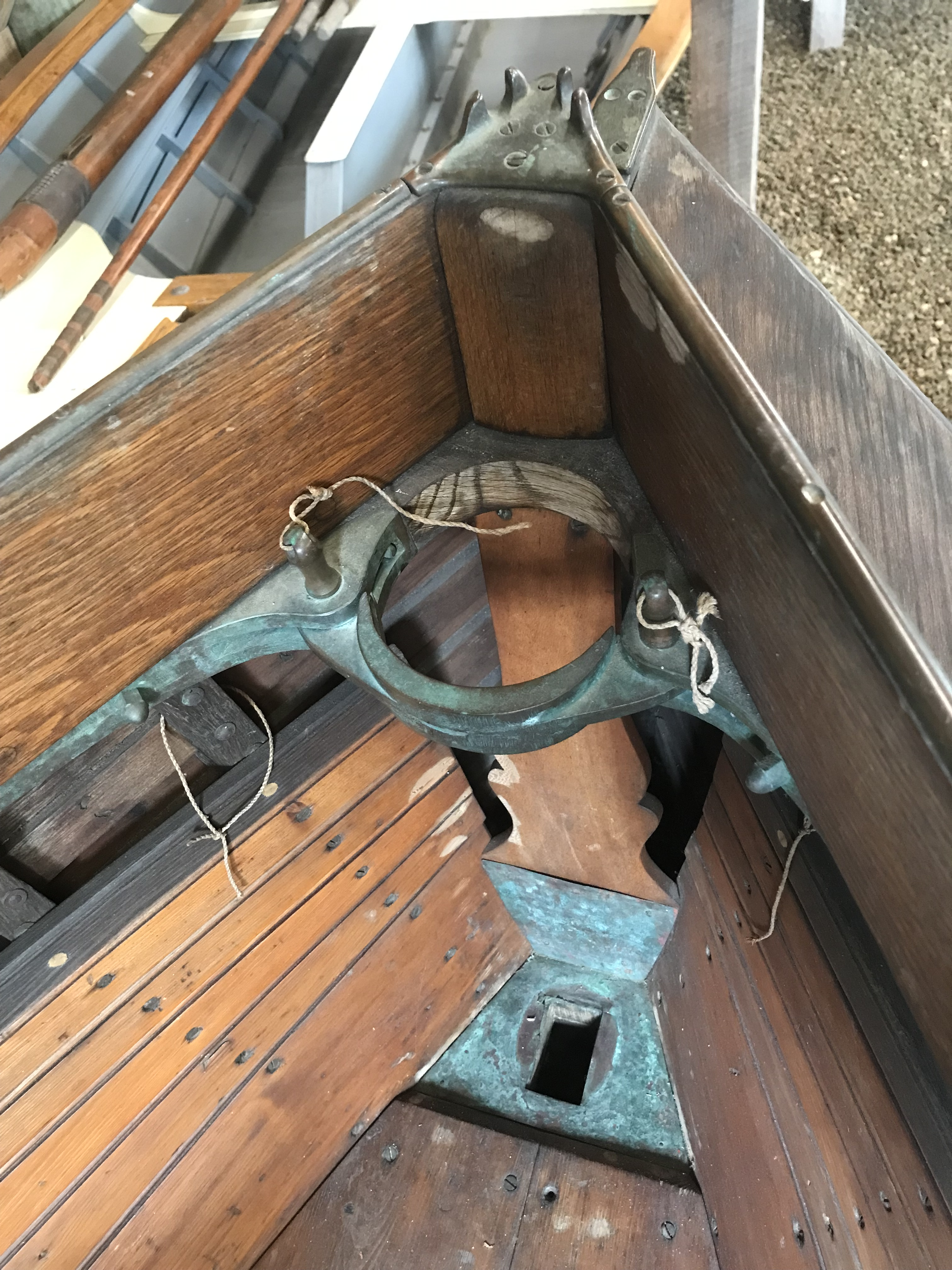
Bronze gate comprising the mast partner in E.E. Swift's Susie, showing the thole pins that allow the mast to be dropped easily. Note also the bronze plate over the mast step.

The spritsail boat's mast was let down by opening the mast partner, a bronze (or wooden) gate located in the breasthook or immediately behind the stem apron. Anecdotally, this design feature appeared because of the fixed bridges over the "gutters" connecting some of the minor embayments in Woods Hole and in the proximate Elizabeth Islands. The most cited example concerns the historic entrance from Great Harbor to Eel Pond in Woods Hole, where it was said that a fisherman could sail up to the fixed stone bridge, let down his mast, and use the boat's momentum to glide under the bridge. The boats typically exhibited two rowing stations, with oars placed between thole pins attached to the coaming, allowing the helmsman or crew to stand facing forward while pushing the oars to propel the boat.

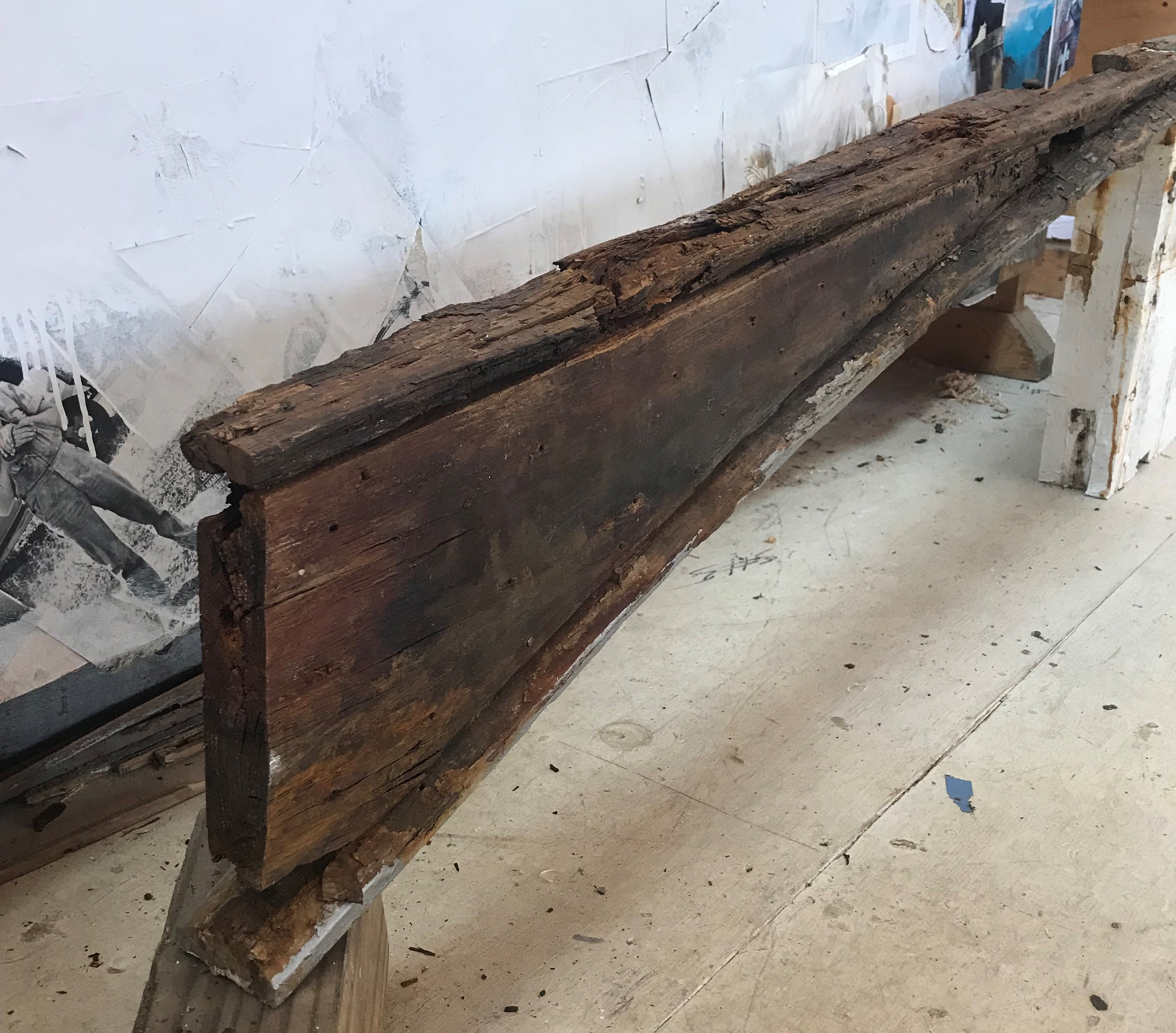
Horizontally kerfed sprung keel and incorporated deadwood in the unidentified Woods Hole spritsail boat (ca. 1905). The severe degradation of the oak in both pieces was likely the consequence of fiberglass sheathing.

The spritsail boat has a through-keel centerboard and a shallow, "barn-door" rudder; the latter extending only to the bottom of the keel or skeg. Designs for the keel and skeg differed across the boats. Some of the older fishing spritsails exhibited substantial one-piece or battened deep keels. The set-up for others comprised a skeg mounted under a keel batten and capped with a keel shoe. One design, reflected in the unidentified original boat (ca. 1905), incorporated the skeg as deadwood into the aft end of a keel in which a kerf had been resawn horizontally.

Some unique design features were common across all spritsail boats, while others appeared to be more idiosyncratic. In many of the early boats, the centerboard slots were cut as a single kerf and opened up with wedges just forward and aft of the locations of the centerboard case standards. Often bed-logs were used to help fasten the case to the keel with through-bolts. Frames meeting the keel on either side of the case were mortised with half-dovetails and fixed in place with small side-wedges. The backbones and scantlings of the older boats were heavy, reflecting their intended use for fishing in the often rough local waters.

== List of extant boats ==
Few historical records exist describing the complete fleet of Woods Hole spritsail boats. Fourteen boats were said to have comprised the "Class A" racing fleet. Some newspapers, magazines, and unpublished documents have recorded many of the boat names, including Ace of Clubs, Carrie, Dove, Ef, Emma, Florence, Francis C., Hope, In It, K.T., Mary E., Rattlesnake, Sappho, T.C., Trilby, and White Dove.

The Herreshoff Manufacturing Company in Bristol built at least three Woods Hole spritsail boats (Dude [1896, No. 474], Wiz [1898, No. 498], and Gee [1900, No. 537]). Both Dude and Wiz were constructed using the model and the molds for Nathanael Herreshoff’s favorite personal yacht Coquina (1889; #404s). Described as a "skimming dish", Gee conformed to the letter of the broad WHYC Class A rules, but, with its features designed specifically for racing, it constituted a radical change from the more traditional spritsail boats. The Herreshoff spritsail boats comprised flush-lapped planking fastened with clenched tacks, and legend has it that Nathanael Herreshoff personally recommended the use of forestays for the racing class.

E.E. Swift, a local carpenter, cabinetmaker, and owner of a hardware store in Woods Hole, built three spritsail boats, including Spy, Susie, and a boat that was never named. The former two were known to be competitive, but the latter was never raced or even sailed. As early as 1898, Charles Eldred of Quissett Harbor built Emma, and at least one other in 1907 whose identity is unknown.

The following Woods Hole spritsail boats are known to be extant:

Old Pal (ca. 1860): Length 13'4", beam 5'8". Old Pal was reputedly built before the US Civil War in Fair Haven, Massachusetts. Its battened seams, jogged frames, open cockpit, and flooring are indicative of its construction as a spritsail boat. Partial restoration by previous owners removed the centerboard and case, replacing it with a heavy keel. Old Pal was donated by its owners to the Mystic Seaport Museum in 1997, where it is currently stored as part of their archived collection in the museum’s Mill Building.

Explorer (1890): Length 13'3", beam 5'11". The Wilton Crosby yard in Osterville built T.C. (ca. 1885), which was later renamed Explorer and donated to Mystic Seaport in 1960 after a partial restoration by its last private owner, the renowned oceanographer A.C. Redfield. The boat has been described as typical of the working spritsail boats, exhibiting a wedged kerf for the CB slot and half-dovetailed mortises for the ends of the central frames, both of which were Crosby innovations. The ceiling was made out of cypress, also a Crosby technique. Explorer was donated by Redfield to the Mystic Seaport Museum in 1960, where it is currently stored as part of their archived collection in the museum’s Mill Building.

Spy (1893–94). Length 13'4", beam 6'0". Spy was the first of the E.E. Swift spritsail boats, built at his shop on Eel Pond in Woods Hole. Like Swift’s other boats, including Susie and his unnamed boat, Spy was built for racing, but it displays the heavy scantlings of the working spritsail boats from the same period. The top of the centerboard case rises above the level of the sheer (and it even clears the top of the coaming) to accommodate a larger board that would extend lower than those fitted into the much lighter racing spritsail boats. Spy was discovered by Bob Baker on a beach at Tripp’s Boatyard in Westport, Massachusetts; it was restored by him and donated to the Woods Hole Historical Museum, where it is currently on exhibit.

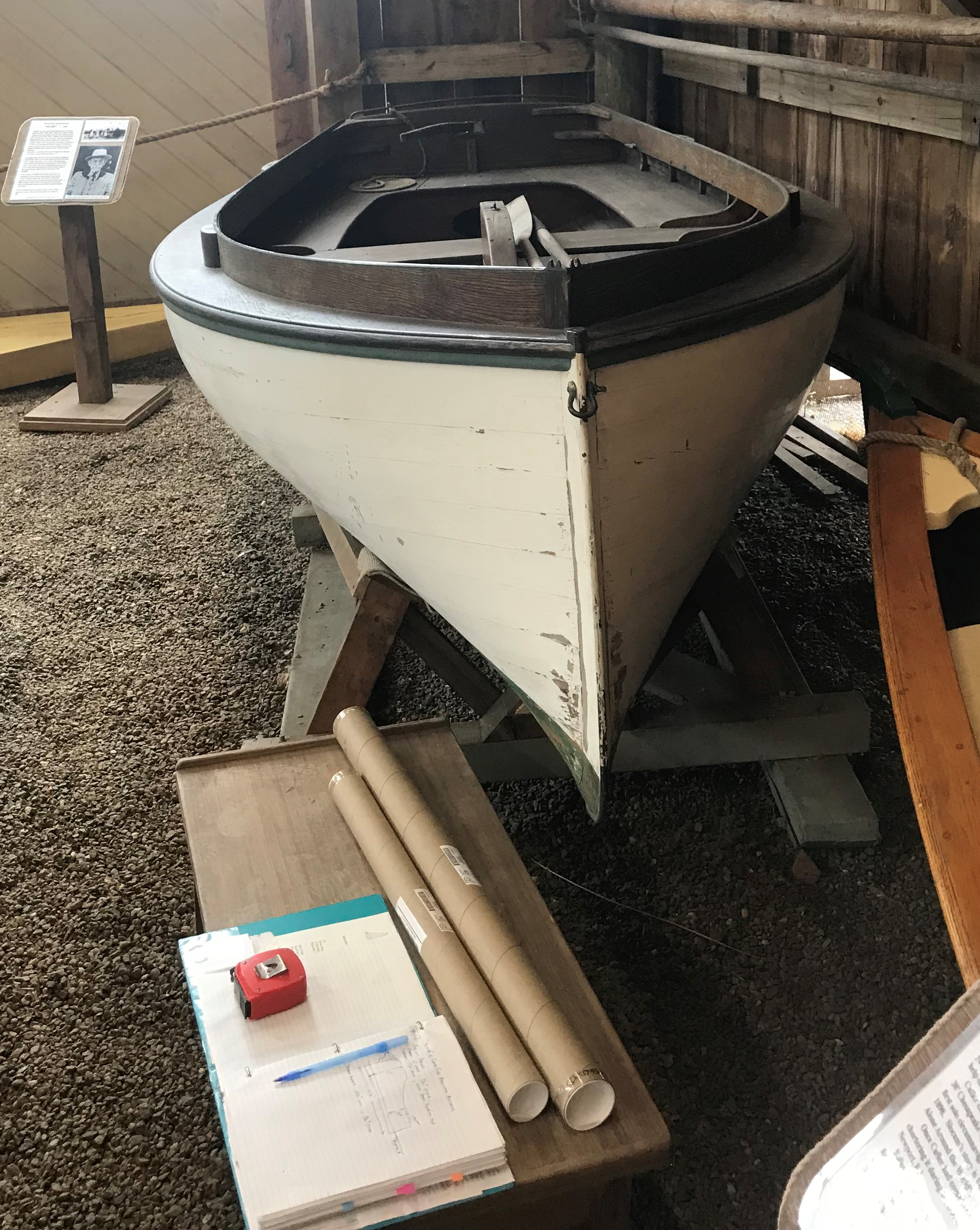
E.E. Swift's build "Susie" which now belongs in the collection of the Cape Cod Maritime Museum in Hyannis, Mass.

Susie (1896). Length 13'0", beam 6'0". E.E. Swift’s second boat shared many of the same construction features as her predecessor, but Dave Dillion noticed some adjustments to the position of the flooring. Moreover, she was reputed to be more successful in racing than Spy. Susie was built for E.E. Swift’s father to race with the Class B "working" spritsails, but after several successes she was moved into Class A. Along with Swift’s unnamed boat, Susie was transported to the other side of Woods Hole's Eel Pond during the 1938 hurricane, during which Swift’s barn was heavily damaged. After repairs to the barn, both boats were returned there for storage for another 26 years. Both boats were inherited by Swift’s grand-niece, who donated the unnamed boat to Mystic Seaport and sailed Susie in Dennis Port for several years. Susie was sold to Bob Baker in 1969, and then donated to Mystic upon his passing in 1986. Eventually, Susie was deaccessioned from the Seaport's collection, finding her current home at the Cape Cod Maritime Museum in Hyannis, Massachusetts, where she is on active display.

Unidentified Spritsail Boat (ca. 1905): Length 13'3", beam 6'0". The builder and original owner of this boat is unknown, but experts at the Woods Hole Historical Museum have identified the date of the build as ca. 1905. The boat's hull was fiberglassed many decades ago, and it spent some period of time in private ownership on Martha’s Vineyard. The scantlings are light, suggesting that it may have been built as a Class A racing spritsail. It features batten seams, garboards lapped by the first broads, and a skeg incorporated as deadwood into the aft end of a horizontally kerfed keel. The stem-to-keel joint is complex, comprising a gripe, a knee, and a stem apron—all made of white oak. There is no mast-step. The boat was under partial restoration at the IYRS boat-building and restoration program in Newport, Rhode Island during the summers of 2021 and 2022. The unidentified boat remains privately owned.

E.E. Swift’s Unnamed Spritsail Boat (1913–14): Length 13'4", beam 6'0". This boat follows most of the features of Susie, but Swift used heavier scantlings and planks, eschewing the batten seams. The unnamed spritsail boat was built by Swift for his brother Helon, who died before the boat could be finished. As a consequence, Swift discontinued work and put it into storage. It was discovered in 1965 in the basement of a barn in Woods Hole where Swift built and stored his boats. Swift’s unnamed boat was donated to the Mystic Seaport Museum in 1968, where it has been on active display in the Small Boat Shed for many years.

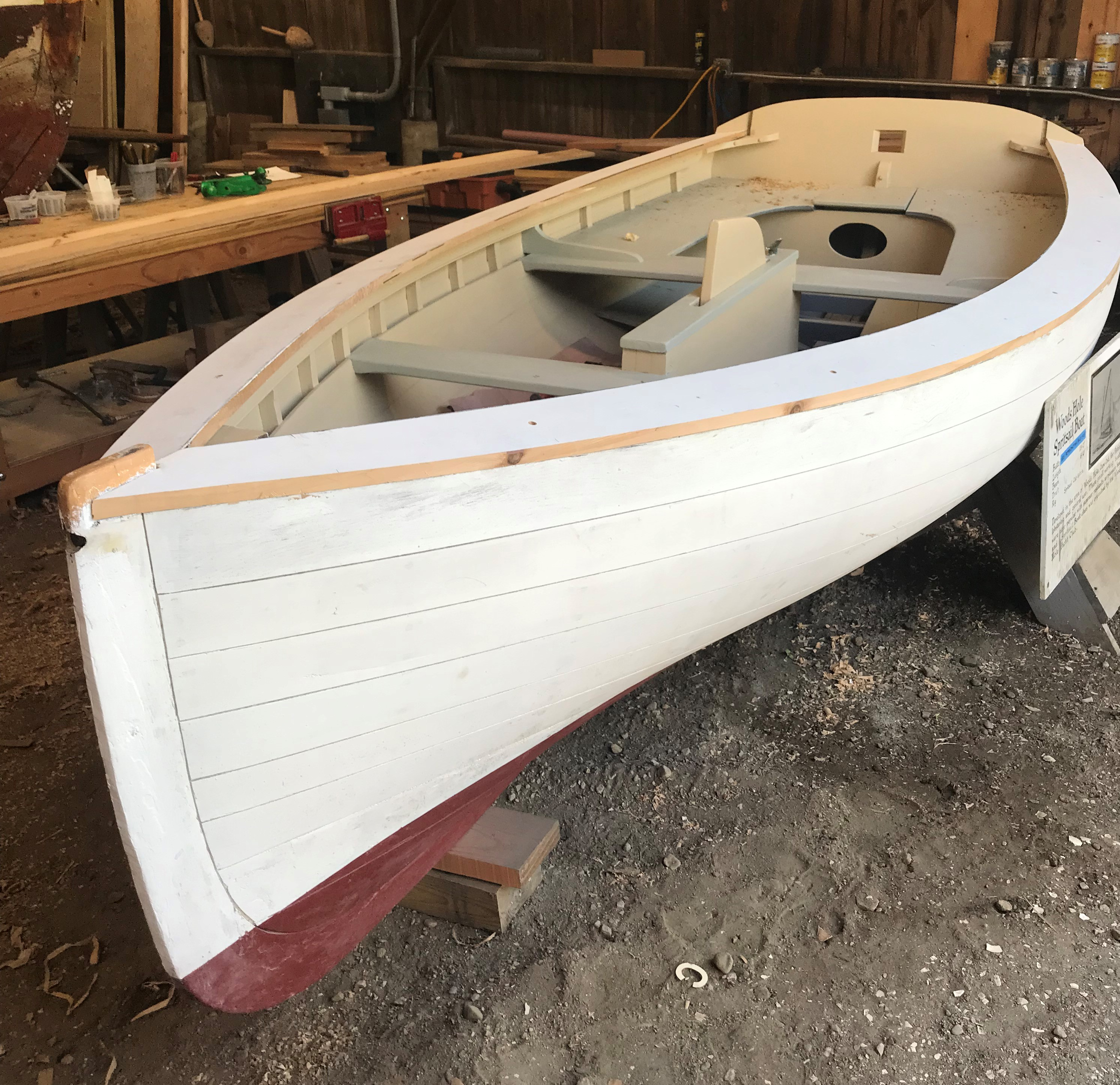
S. Costelloe's build Sandy Ford, under restoration at Mystic Seaport in 2021.

Sandy Ford (1972) Length 13'3", beam 5'11". Sandy Ford is a replica built on the lines of Explorer at the Mystic Seaport Museum in 1972 by Sylvester Costelloe as a college work study project. Costelloe also drafted construction plans in 1972, which appear in his report on the project. For many years, it served as one of the boats in the museum’s livery fleet. In recent years, it underwent an extensive restoration, comprising a "living" museum exhibit per se, and it was returned to the livery fleet when restoration was completed in the summer of 2022.

Nonnamesset (1983) Length 13'4", beam 6'0". Nonnamesset was built by the professional engineer David Martin from Woods Hole, Massachusetts on lines of E.E. Swift’s unnamed boat. Nonnamesset remains privately owned.

Roberta (1997): Length 13'0", beam 6'0". Roberta was built by the Taylor & Snediker boatyard in Mystic, Connecticut on the lines of Susie. Roberta was sold into private hands but later donated to Mystic Seaport Museum, where currently it is located. At present, Roberta is not on exhibit.

Dewey (2000): Length 13'4", beam 6'0". Dewey was built by students at Seattle Central College on the lines of E.E. Swift’s unnamed boat. The boat was donated to the Center for Wooden Boats in Seattle, where it serves as one of the boats in its active livery fleet. (The Center for Wooden Boats also restored a 14-foot Wenaumet Bluffs Kitten that had been mistaken for a Woods Hole spritsail boat because its interior was laid out like the latter.)

== Disappearance of the Woods Hole spritsail boat ==
When speaking of the exceptionalism of the Beetle Cat, which celebrated its 100th anniversary in 2021, Waldo Howland wrote that "I am quite sure that there are not many classes of sailboats that have celebrated a 50th anniversary." Consequently, the 54-year period dating from the builds of Old Pal (ca. 1860) to E.E. Smith’s unnamed boat (1913–14) suggests that the (otherwise seemingly short) active period of the Woods Hole spritsail boat was not unusual for a sailboat type. It is difficult to identify the precise reason for the falling out of favor of any class of boats, but it was likely that there was no one single cause in the case of the Woods Hole spritsail. Some plausible reasons are as follows:

=== The term "one-design" was a misnomer for the class ===
The original plan in 1897 of the Woods Hole Yacht Club divided the spritsail boat fleet in into two subclasses: racing spritsails (class A) and working spritsails (class B). The plan included rules for maintaining the one-design aspects of the boats, but yacht architects such as Nathanael Herreshoff were adept at creating new designs, such as Gee, that seemed to take advantage of lacunae in the rules. In a case where the one-design rules were incomplete or vague, those who could most easily afford new designs would be advantaged over others. And where prize money was frequently offered, the owners of fast boats could afford to maintain sails, rigging, and hulls in better condition and to hire boat captains with local knowledge of currents and winds to helm their boats. Further, some of the Class B "working" boats (Susie may have been the best example) were so dominant that they were moved into Class A. It may not have gone unnoticed that fishermen or local boat captains racing in Class A were paying lower annual membership dues as well as reinvesting their prize monies to maintain or upgrade their boats.

=== Woods Hole Yacht Club's "Great Rift" ===
In 1910, the Woods Hole Yacht Club discontinued its formal activities as a consequence of a disagreement between its Trustees, who owned shares in the club's boat house, and many of the members. When the club had been established originally in 1897, the Trustees had arranged to recoup their original investments in the boat house by charging the club’s members an annual fee. These dues were fixed at two levels, with the fishermen paying a much smaller amount. Especially at issue in 1910 were apparently unfair "assessments" that had been added to the annual dues. The discontinuation of racing in Woods Hole contributed to the establishment of a new yacht club at Quissett Harbor (also in Woods Hole) in 1912, where an existing hotel served as its clubhouse. When the Woods Hole Yacht Club finally reconstituted its formal racing activities nearly two decades later, the spritsail boats had disappeared, and knockabouts of various types (including the Cape Cod “baby” knockabout, the Herreshoff 12½, and the S-boat) had been adopted as racing classes.

=== Seaworthiness of the design ===
Like many round-bottomed boats, the spritsail boats were difficult to handle on a "dead run" (the wind directly aft). This was undoubtedly true in the breezy, choppy environments of Buzzards Bay and Vineyard Sound—not to mention when these conditions were combined with the tidal currents (up to 6 knots/hour) running through Woods Hole passage. When racing, the boats typically carried ballast, such as sand bags or stone (or sometimes crewmembers were counted as ballast), but no positive buoyancy other than the wood embodied in the hull and spars. In one race in 1898, Dude sank to the bottom in 40 feet of water, and several years later another working boat capsized with loss of life. Eventually, other classes demonstrating an arguably higher degree of handling safety and seaworthiness (the knockabouts) came into favor.

=== Technological changes ===
The Woods Hole spritsail boat never quite shook off its artisanal roots as a working boat, characterized by its easily furled sails, its capability for quickly dropping its rig, and its two rowing stations. Unlike the late 19th century one-design racing boats, such as the North Haven Dinghy, the Wenaumet Bluffs Kitten, or the Beetle Cat (in 1921), the Woods Hole spritsail attempted ambitiously—but ultimately unsuccessfully—to be both a working and a racing class. Once the outboard motor began to come into use at the turn of the 20th century, the need for sails and oars as the primary means of propulsion in small working boats declined rapidly. A classified advertisement for a used spritsail boat in 1907 included as a main selling point the possibility of turning it into a motorboat.

== Enduring cultural significance ==
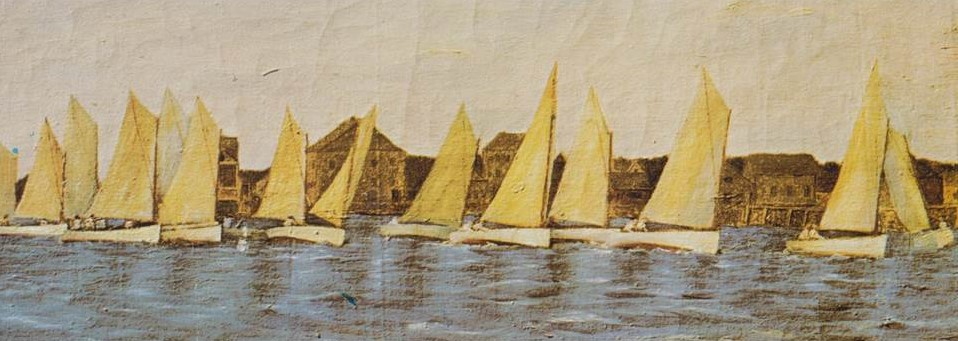
Start of a Woods Hole spritsail boat race off Bar Neck Wharf at the entrance to Great Harbor in 1900.

On the cusp of the 20th century, in coastal New England, a small "spritsail" sailboat from Woods Hole, Massachusetts achieved regional acclaim and local prestige, involving leading boat-builders and yacht designers, including Wilton Crosby and Nathanael Herreshoff, in its design and construction. Later, the boat attracted the attention of the naval architect L. Francis Herreshoff, the boat restorers John Gardner and Bob Baker, the maritime historians Howard Chapelle and Maynard Bray, and even the renowned oceanographer Alfred C. Redfield.

The maritime reporter and historian John Leather, who classified the early Woods Hole spritsail boats as a type of small fishing smack, noted further that the Woods Hole spritsail had “…a pedigree as long as any of the larger traditional types.” Concerning the local carpenter E.E. Swift’s build of the Woods Hole spritsail boat Susie, the nautical draftsman Dave Dillion once commented: “…I am prejudiced as the devil; I think this is an absolutely beautiful boat…”

In his 1968 topical article in The Skipper about the Woods Hole spritsail boat, H.V.R Palmer observed that "The little spritsail boats have left Woods Hole now." Even with the disappearance of the spritsail boat in Woods Hole, its legacy remains culturally important today, both to the local community and to the larger field of wooden boat builders and enthusiasts. The Woods Hole Historical Museum has adopted the spritsail boat as its physical symbol, naming more than 30 years ago its professional journal "The Spritsail," displaying E.E. Swift's Spy in its maritime exhibit space in Woods Hole, and featuring spritsail racing in its turn-of-the-20th-century diorama. The Woods Hole Public Library has on display some of Franklin Gifford's (the owner of Ace of Clubs) oil paintings, including one of the start of a spritsail boat race in 1900.

Five examples of the boat, spanning the years 1860 to 1997 are held in the small boat collection of the Mystic Seaport Museum, and line drawings have been made of the important original boats. At least three half models of spritsail boat designs are in the collection of the Herreshoff Marine Museum in Bristol, Rhode Island, although boats were built from only two of these. Replicas continue to be built, including boats constructed in 1972, 1983, 1997, and 2000, and two of these are in the active recreational liveries of maritime museums.
