= Sam Merrick (disambiguation) =

Samuel, Sam Merrick or Sam Meyrick may refer to:

- Sam Merrick a.k.a. Samuel Vaughan Merrick (1914-2000), sailor and preeminent labor lawyer
- Sam Merrick, guitarist and former member of the Los Angeles rock band Nymphs
- Sam Merrick, drummer and member of Brooklyn rock band That Handsome Devil
