= Penguin (dinghy) =

1933 dinghy design, over 10,000 built

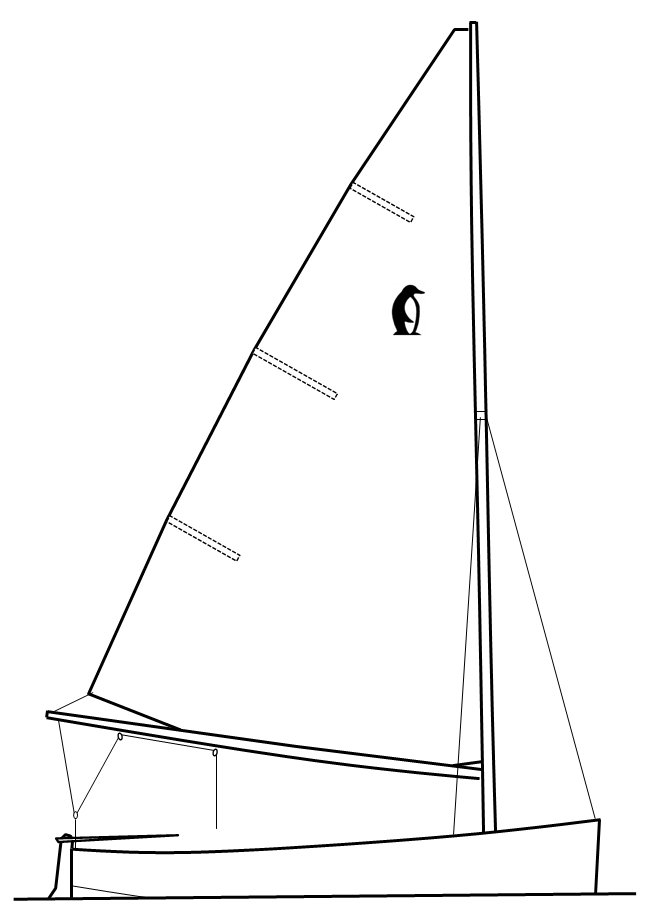

Development
- Designer: Philip Rhodes
- Location: United States
- Year: 1939
- No. built: 10,000
- Builders: W. D. Schock Corp; Jack A. Helms Co. Ron Rawson, Inc. Customflex; Skaneateles Boat & Canoe Co.
- Role: One design-racer
- Name: Penguin

Boat
- Crew: one
- Displacement: 140 lb (64 kg)
- Draft: 3.83 ft (1.17 m) with centerboard down

Hull
- Type: monohull
- Construction: wood or fiberglass
- LOA: 11.42 ft (3.48 m)
- Beam: 4.67 ft (1.42 m)

Hull appendages
- Keel: centerboard
- Rudder: transom-mounted rudder

Rig
- Rig type: cat rig
- P mainsail luff: 16.00 ft (4.88 m)
- E mainsail foot: 8.67 ft (2.64 m)

Sails
- Sailplan: catboat
- Mainsail area: 69.36 sq ft (6.444 m^{2})
- Total sail area: 69.36 sq ft (6.444 m^{2})

Racing
- D-PN: 111.5

The Penguin is an American sailing dinghy that was designed by Philip Rhodes in 1933 as a one design racer for frostbite racing on the US east coast and first built in 1939.

== Production ==
Rhodes drew the original design in 1933 for a competition to define a new boat for the frostbite racing fleets sailed in Manhasset Bay and at Larchmont, New York. Rhodes' design lost to a boat by Olin Stephens of Sparkman & Stephens and as a result Rhodes shelved the plans until 1938 when some Potomac River sailors were looking for a new frostbite racing boat. They home-built 12 boats and racing was started on winter weekends. Yachting magazine covered a race series and advertised where plans could be obtained and that led to an expansion in interest in the boat design and it quickly grew to a national class.

The design was originally intended to be built by amateur builders from wood using paper plans, but fiberglass was class-approved for the hull in 1959. Boats have been manufactured by W. D. Schock Corp, Jack A. Helms Co., Ron Rawson, Inc., Customflex and Skaneateles Boat & Canoe Co. in the United States. More than 10,000 boats have been built. The boat is no longer in production, but plans are still available for home construction. Plans are publicly provided at no charge by the class association in the form of PDF downloads.

W. D. Schock Corp records indicate that that company built 32 boats between 1964 and 1967.

== Design ==
The Penguin is a recreational sailboat, built predominantly of plywood or fiberglass, with wood trim. It has a catboat rig, a plumb stem and transom, a transom-hung rudder controlled by a tiller and a retractable centerboard. It displaces 140 lb (64 kg).

The boat has a draft of 3.83 ft (1.17 m) with the centerboard extended and 4 in (10 cm) with it retracted, allowing operation in shallow water, beaching or ground transportation on a trailer or car roof.

The design has a Portsmouth Yardstick D-PN handicap of 111.5.

== Operational history ==
The boat is supported by an active class club that organizes racing events, the International Penguin Class Dinghy Association.

In a 2010 Small Boats Monthly profile Chris Museler wrote, "Like many racing dinghies, the boats are easy to sail but hard to sail well. 'It humbles a lot of folks,' says [Jonathan Bartlett, a Maryland sailmaker], referring to the oversized centerboard and hard chines that the boat can trip over in gusty conditions. 'If you can sail a Penguin well, you can sail anything.' It is a simple boat. 'It's not a Laser. But for the nostalgia and classic look, it's hard to beat it.'"

Museler concluded, "they seem like silly little boats at first, and certainly now are considered obscure. But that seems to be the attraction of many little wooden boats—their uniqueness, and rareness. The best part about the Penguin is that whether you are hiked out with a friend inches away from a competitor or sitting on the floorboards on a lazy summer afternoon, you are surrounded by a little bit of sailing history and a lot of class."

== See also ==
- Cape Cod Frosty
- Interclub Dinghy
- Chesapeake Bay Maritime Museum - Hull number 1.
