= Mystic Catboat 20 =

1970s American recreational keelboat

Development
- Designer: Peter Legnos
- Location: United States
- Year: 1974
- Builder: Legnos Boatbuilding Company
- Role: Cruiser

Boat
- Displacement: 3,000 lb (1,361 kg)
- Draft: 4.25 ft (1.30 m) with centerboard down

Hull
- Type: monohull
- Construction: fiberglass
- LOA: 20.00 ft (6.10 m)
- LWL: 18.50 ft (5.64 m)
- Beam: 8.00 ft (2.44 m)
- Engine: Yanmar 1GM diesel engine or outboard motor

Hull appendages
- Keel: stub long keel and centerboard
- Ballast: 700 lb (318 kg)
- Rudder: keel-mounted rudder

Rig
- Rig type: catboat rig

Sails
- Sailplan: catboat
- Mainsail area: 282.00 sq ft (26.199 m^{2})
- Total sail area: 282.00 sq ft (26.199 m^{2})

Racing
- PHRF: 315

The Mystic Catboat 20 is a sailboat that was designed by Peter Legnos as a cruiser and first built in 1974.

== Production ==
The design was built by the Legnos Boatbuilding Company in the United States between 1974 and 1987, but it is now out of production. The Legnos Boatbuilding Company still existed in 2021, renamed as LBI Corporation Inc, but is now predominantly engaged in defense contract work and no longer builds sailboats.

== Design ==
The Mystic Catboat 20 is a recreational keelboat, built predominantly of fiberglass, with wood trim. The standard rigging for the design is as a gaff-rigged catboat with a sail area of 282.00 sq ft (26.199 m^{2}). An alternative rig positions the mast further aft, with a smaller mainsail, a bowsprit and a jib, turning it into a gaffhead sloop rig with a sail area of 273.00 sq ft (25.363 m^{2}).

The boat's hull has a plumb stem; a raised counter, angled transom; a keel-mounted rudder controlled by a tiller and a fixed stub long keel, with a retractable centerboard. It displaces 3,000 lb (1,361 kg) and carries 700 lb (318 kg) of ballast.

The boat has a draft of 4.25 ft (1.30 m) with the centerboard extended and 2.08 ft (0.63 m) with it retracted, allowing operation in shallow water, beaching or ground transportation on a trailer.

The boat is fitted with a Japanese Yanmar 1GM diesel engine or other inboard gasoline engine, or, alternatively, a small 4 to 8 hp (3 to 6 kW) outboard motor for docking and maneuvering. When fitted, the optional fixed fuel tank holds 20 U.S. gallons (76 L; 17 imp gal).

The design has sleeping accommodation for two people, with a double "V"-berth in the bow cabin. The galley is located on the port side at the companionway ladder. The galley is equipped with a two-burner stove and a sink. The head is located opposite the galley on the starboard side. Cabin headroom is 47 in (119 cm).

The design has a PHRF racing average handicap of 315 and a hull speed of 5.6 kn (10.4 km/h).

== Operational history ==
In a 2010 review Steve Henkel wrote, "unlike most of her comp[etitor]s, the Mystic Catboat 20 was designed to resemble a 19th century gentleman's cruising cat rather than a traditional working cat. To a large extent this sealed her fate as a catboat judged to be less seakindly—and therefore less popular—than the 'working' cat designs. She was offered with either gasoline or diesel inboard as options, and also was offered as a sloop, which may have lessened some of her worst features under sail as enumerated below. Best features: With her raked, wineglass transom, she is as a pretty as a picture. Worst features: She lacks many of the salutary features of a typical working cat, such as a big beam-to-length ratio, D/L of at least 200, outboard 'barn door' rudder hung on a vertical (not raked) transom, larger rudder and centerboard areas for better control, and big 'shoulders' aft to minimize broaching in heavy air and choppy seas."
