= Lake George (Indiana–Michigan) =

- Location within the state of Michigan
- Location: Steuben County, Indiana and Branch County, Michigan
- Coordinates: 41°45′30″N 85°00′29″W
- Basin countries: United States
- Managing agency: Indiana Department of Natural Resources
- Surface area: 509 acres (206 ha)
- Average depth: 22 ft (6.7 m)
- Max. depth: 85 ft (26 m)
- Surface elevation: 984 ft (300 m)

Lake George is a recreational lake on the Indiana–Michigan state line, located two-thirds in Steuben County, Indiana, and one-third in Branch County, Michigan. Nearby towns are Angola and Fremont in Indiana, and Coldwater and Kinderhook in Michigan.

A mill pond and dam built in 1923 is located at the south end of the lake, where the once-prosperous community of Jamestown is located. The mill was destroyed by fire before WWII but its foundations can still be found. The dam construction raised the water level to make three bodies of water into one unified lake. Dam ownership has been a point of contention between the residents of the lake and the State of Indiana. Important land features include Brown's Point, Kope Kon Point, and the Mill Pond.

The lake is home to the international headquarters of the Inland Cat Class Sailing Association. Until recently, it was the world's largest single-class inland fleet and competitive racing occurred throughout the summer months. The 16' long sailboats with a single sail were built by residents who owned a Fort Wayne fiberglass company in the 1960s and 1970s.

The Lake George Cottagers Association was established in 1927. The LGCA website is www.lakegeorgein.com. Cottagers have also established The Lake George Conservancy in the 2005 to protect surrounding land and to preserve the lake environs. Once almost exclusively surrounded by seasonal cottages which all

It is commonly rumored that John Dillinger and members of his infamous bank-robbing gang hid out on a lakefront home that still stands on the lake today on Lane 201. The location was supposedly chosen due to its proximity to the Indiana-Michigan state line, making it easier for the gang to evade local police. The cottage belonged to Homer VanMeter's uncle. Homer was a prominent member of Dillinger's gang, and he is buried in the Lindenwood Cemetery in Fort Wayne, Indiana. Local folklore claims that John Dillinger and his gang were working on the cottage for a couple of weeks during their stay. Every day, a neighbor lady next door would fix their lunch, and when they left, someone told her who the well-dressed young men were. She could not believe it because they were such polite young men.

Lake George is approximately 525 acres (212 ha) and is 85 ft (26 m) at its deepest point. There is significant historical evidence of Native American inhabitants living around Lake George.

The lake is home to many species of fish, which were stocked by former deputy game warden and director of the Lake George Cottager's Association, Fred Wiegman in the early 20th century. Early in its history, the Lake George Cottager's Association obtained permission for fishing in the lake using either Michigan or Indiana fishing licenses. Today, the lake is a fishing hot spot for Bass and Northern Pike.

In September 2020, freshwater jellyfish were spotted for the first time in Lake George. The jellyfish, known by its Latin name Craspedacusta sowerbii, has been spotted in over 20 bodies of water in Indiana previously, and they are found throughout the world although they are supposedly uncommon. They are typically seen in late summer, but there appearance is sporadic and unpredictable. The jellyfish are only about the size of a penny and are translucent, making them difficult to spot. Please report any new sightings to the Indiana DNR.
