= Inland Cat =

Class of sailboat

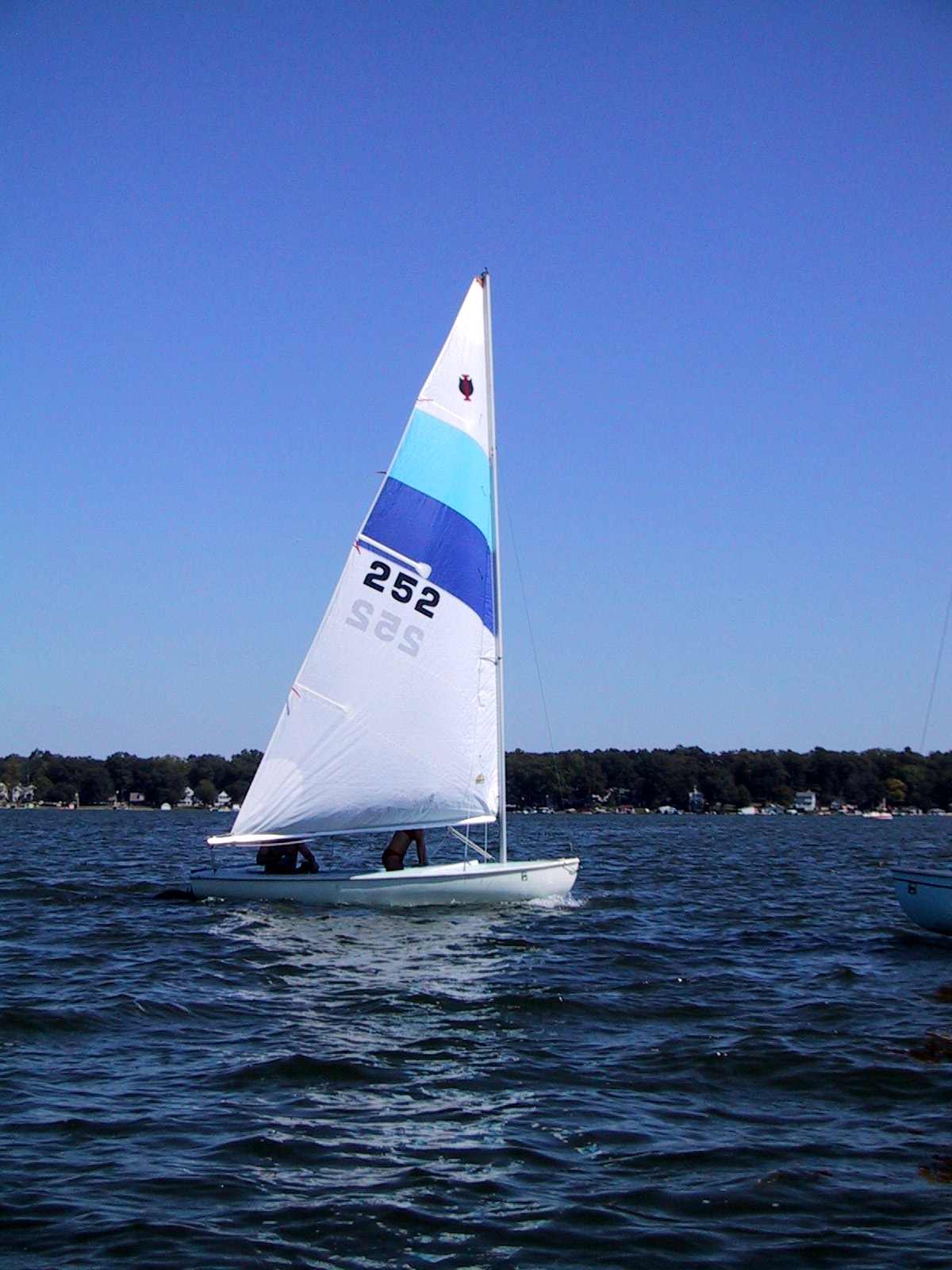

Inland Cat is a class of one- or two-man sailboats, almost exclusively found on Lake George, Indiana/Michigan. The craft is approximately 14.5 feet in length, with a 4.5 foot beam. The sail is a Marconi rig (aka Bermuda rig), with the mast far forward on the hull, as is the norm for a cat boat. The boat has a retractable galvanized steel centerboard, and a shallow-draft aluminum rudder similar in shape to New England–style cat boats. The design was created by Norm Bell and John Larimore in the mid-1950s and used then-current polyester resin and fiberglass construction techniques. The boat was perhaps over-engineered, and is quite robustly built. Many examples, including hull No. 2 (the second production boat) continue to race every Saturday during the summer months.

There were 250+ Inland Cats built by Bell/Larimore and a nearby boatbuilder in the 1950s thru early 1970s. The only concentration of boats is on Lake George proper, which has a few dozen surviving craft. Of these, 20+ come out to race in the "Gold" and "Silver" fleets each week during the Summer. The first summer of racing was in 1957.

Due to its heavy construction and wide beam, the Inland Cat is very stable in heavy air, and not particularly fast. The class has a PHRF rating of 107. It is not uncommon on balmy summer days to see the entire fleet bobbing in light air, tossed about by jet skis and other boat wakes.

The Inland Cat logo is a black silhouette of a cat's head (facing viewer) with a red "I" centered over it.
