= Beetle Cat =

Sailboat class

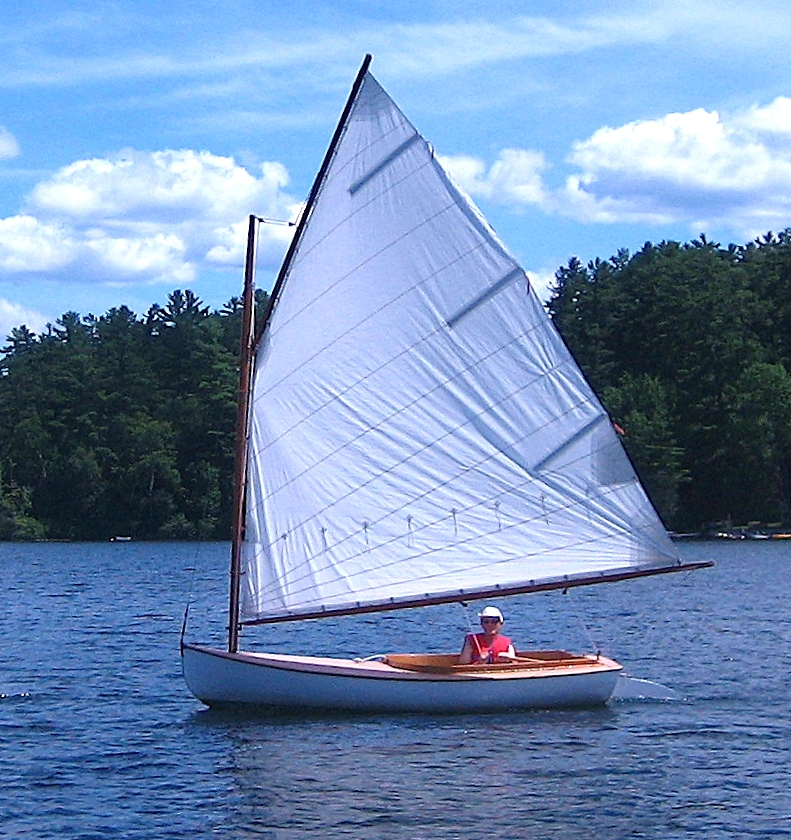

Development
- Designer: John Beetle
- Location: United States
- Year: 1921
- No. built: more than 4,000
- Builder: Beetle, Inc.
- Role: Sailing dinghy
- Name: Beetle Cat

Boat
- Crew: two
- Displacement: 450 lb (204 kg)
- Draft: 2.00 ft (0.61 m)

Hull
- Type: Monohull
- Construction: Fiberglass
- LOA: 12.33 ft (3.76 m)
- LWL: 11.67 ft (3.56 m)
- Beam: 6.08 ft (1.85 m)

Hull appendages
- Keel: centerboard
- Rudder: transom-mounted rudder

Rig
- Rig type: Cat rig

Sails
- Sailplan: Catboat
- Mainsail area: 140.00 sq ft (13.006 m^{2})
- Total sail area: 140.00 sq ft (13.006 m^{2})

Racing
- D-PN: 103.8

The Beetle Cat is an American one-design sailing dinghy that was designed by John Beetle and first built in 1921. It is a smaller adaptation of traditional Cape Cod 20 to 30 ft (6 to 9 m) catboat designs originally intended for fishing in shallow waters.

The basic design has been widely copied and built under many names in the US and other countries.

== Production ==
The design was initially built by the designer's company, the Beetle Boat Co in New Bedford, Massachusetts, United States. Following the end of the Second World War, the owner of the company at that time was Carl N. Beetle, the son of designer John Beetle. Wanting to concentrate on newer materials for boat manufacturing, he sold the Beetle Cat design rights to the Concordia Company, a company that builds a series of traditional yawls. The design was later passed to Howard Boats of Barnstable, Massachusetts, who still provide parts and repairs for the boat, although they no longer produce new boats. The design was also built in Marans, Charente-Maritime, France by Construction Navale Franck Roy. The current manufacturer is Beetle, Inc. of Wareham, Massachusetts, which operates under the trade name of the Beetle Boat Shop.

More than 4,000 examples of the design have been built.

== Design ==
The Beetle Cat is a recreational sailboat, built predominantly with oak and cedar wooden construction, although some have been built from fiberglass, with wood trim. The deck is canvas-covered. It has a gaff-rigged catboat sailplan with wooden spars of fir, a spooned plumb stem, a near-vertical transom, a shallow depth, transom-hung rudder controlled by a tiller and a retractable centerboard daggerboard. It displaces 450 lb (204 kg), has a wide beam for load carrying capacity.

The boat has a draft of 2.00 ft (0.61 m) with the centreboard/daggerboard extended and 6 in (15 cm) with it retracted, allowing operation in very shallow waters, beaching or ground transportation on a trailer.

The design has no seats. In light winds it is sailed sitting on the cockpit sole and in higher winds on the gunwale. The mainsail is sheeted to a rod-type mainsheet traveler on the transom.

The design has a Portsmouth Yardstick racing average handicap of 103.8. For racing it is normally sailed with a crew of two.

== Operational history ==
Notable owners of Beetle Cats include John Kerry, Jacqueline Onassis, who had one shipped to Greece in 1969 for John F. Kennedy Jr. and Caroline Kennedy to learn to sail in, Steven Spielberg and Calvin Klein.

In a 1994 review Richard Sherwood wrote, "Look for the Beetle Cat on the south and east of Cape Cod, in Buzzards Bay, and in Narragansett Bay. There are also fleets on Long Island. Competition, especially for juniors, is stiff. The Beetle is an excellent, stable training boat."

Reviewing the design in 2007, naval architect Robert Perry, wrote "Beetle Cats are true to the traditional Cape Cod catboat model. They are fat and heavy. They have no overhangs. The strange-looking rudder is designed to give you control in a very shoal-draft boat. Unfortunately, this puts the center of pressure on the rudder blade way aft which exaggerates any helm pressure. The stern is broad. The mast is in the eye of the bow." He summarized it as a "sturdy, traditional catboat with a lively personality."

== See also ==
- List of sailing boat types
- Woods Hole spritsail boat
