= Stuart H. Walker =

American sailor

Stuart Hodge Walker
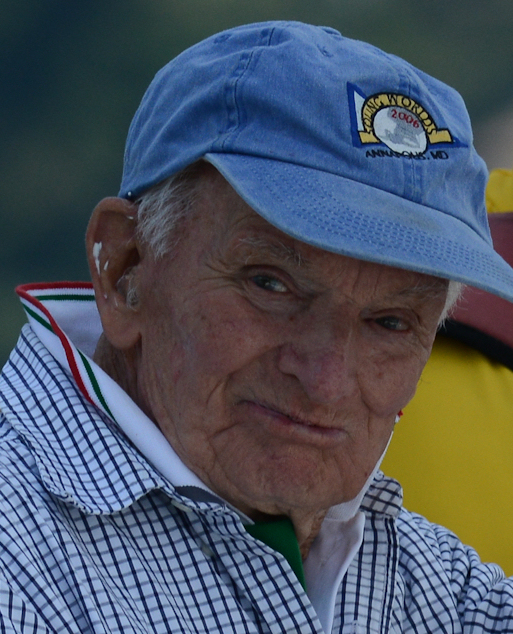
- Walker in 2012
- Born: April 19, 1923; Brooklyn, New York, U.S.
- Died: November 12, 2018 (aged 95); Annapolis, Maryland, U.S.
- Education: Middlebury College
- Alma mater: New York University
- Occupations: Professor of Pediatrics and Chief of Pediatrics
- Years active: Retirement Profession 1984, International Sailing 2016
- Employer: Mercy Medical Center (Baltimore, Maryland)
- Known for: Olympic yachtsman, writer and a professor of pediatrics from the United States. He has competed as a sailor at the Olympic Games; won many national and international championships in different classes.
- Height: 1.75 m (5 ft 9 in)
- Title: President International Soling Association
- Term: 1991 - 1994
- Predecessor: Sam Merrick
- Successor: George Wossala
- Spouse: Frances Taylor (1944 - 2012); Patricia Empey (2013 until his death)
- Children: Susan (1946) and Lee (1950)
- Awards: Sailing World Hall of Fame Class of 1982; United States National Sailing Hall of Fame in Class of 2013

Stuart Hodge Walker (April 19, 1923 – November 12, 2018) was an American Olympic yachtsman, writer, and a professor of pediatrics. He competed as a sailor at the Olympic Games; won many national and international championships in different classes and wrote over ten books.

== Biography ==
Born in 1923 in Brooklyn, New York, Walker attended school in suburban Hartsdale and Bronxville, college at Middlebury College, and medical school at New York University. He was married to Frances (née Taylor) from 1944 until her death on September 30, 2012. They have two daughters Susan (1946) and Lee (1950). Walker was assigned in 1946 as a medical officer to the Army of Occupation of Japan (United States Army 11th Airborne Division (Paratroops)). After reassignment from the army, he started a pediatric practice in Annapolis in 1953. Stuart became a full-time Professor of Pediatrics at the University of Maryland School of Medicine in 1961 and was Chief of Pediatrics at Mercy Hospital in Baltimore until his retirement in 1984. After Frances' death, Stuart married Patricia (née Empey) in 2013.

Sailing in the International 14 class, Walker was a member of every American team in international matches between 1961 and 1971 and was, in 1963, the first American to win Bermuda's Princess Elizabeth Trophy and, in 1964, England's Prince of Wales Cup. He was a member of the American Olympic Team, sailing a 5.5 Meter at the 1968 Games and the Pan-American Games, and a Soling in the 1979 Pan-American Games and the 2012 Vintage Yachting Games.

Walker authored ten books on sailboat racing, sail trim, competitive behavior, and low level wind flow, and was a lecturer and contributor to sailing magazines. He helped found the Severn Sailing Association. He published his 11th book, "Travels with Thermopylae", in 2015, which describes a year of sailing and discovery in central Europe.

Walker was President of the International Soling Class from 1991 through 1994 . In this role he successfully campaigned to keep the Soling in the 1996 Olympics and to continue the fleet/match format. He also established a Technical Committee that included the major builders and which has been successful in openly recognizing and solving problems before they become significant. He travelled on a yearly basis to Europe to compete in Soling regattas.

== Retirement ==
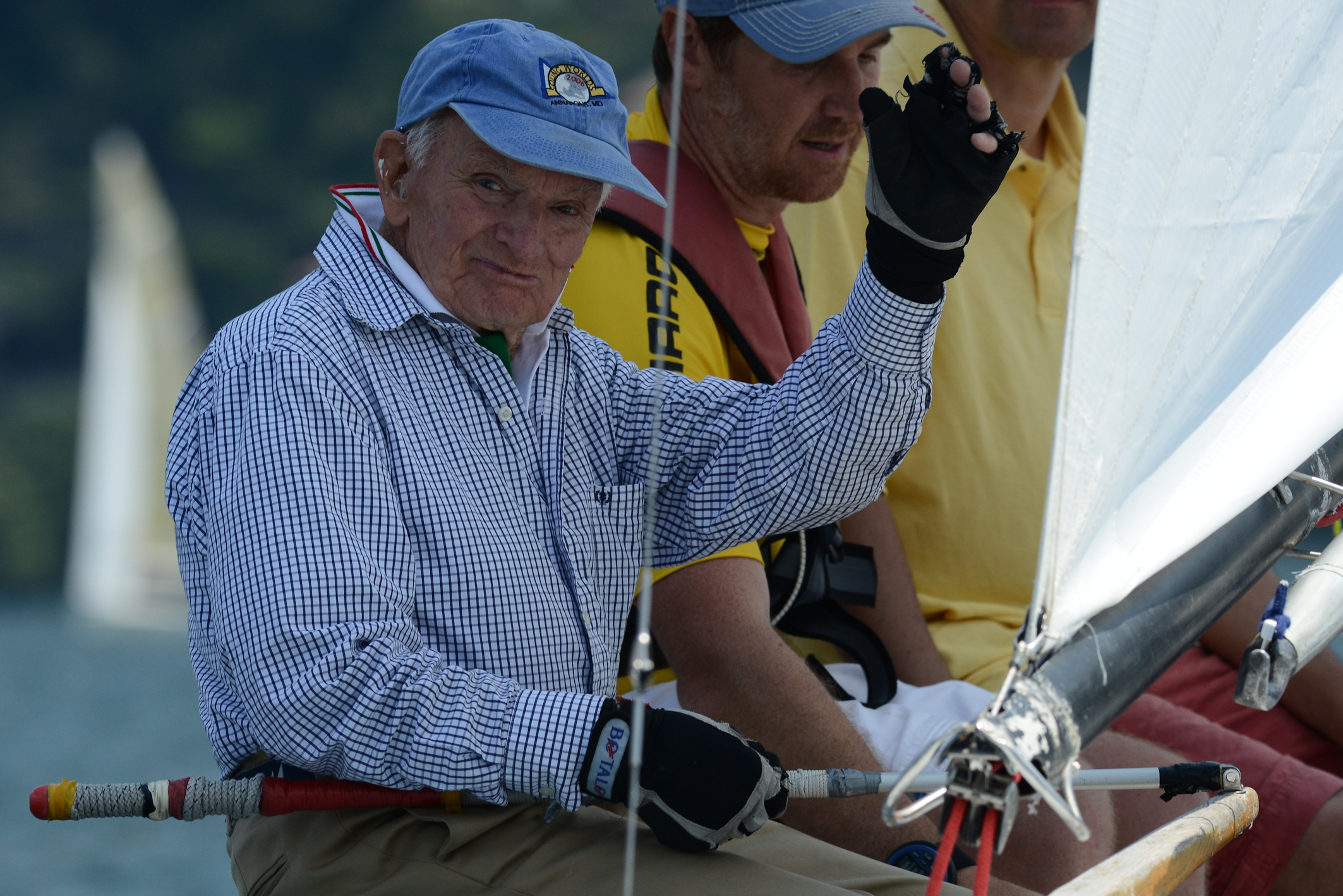
Stuart at the 2012 Vintage Yachting Games

After finishing fifth at the eighth race of the 2016 European Championship Soling at Traunsee, Austria and leading the fleet to the weather mark in the ninth and last race, Walker announced his retirement from sailing on May 23, 2016, due to macular degeneration. With his retirement, he completed a period of 47 years of Soling sailing. After his retirement, Stuart continued sailing local races at the Severn Sailing Association in Annapolis. He died on November 12, 2018, in Annapolis from stomach cancer at the age of 95.

== Palmarès ==
Honours
Sailing World Hall of Fame:Member 1982 – selected as one of the world’s twenty outstanding yachtsmen.
Stuart was inducted into the United States National Sailing Hall of Fame in 2013.
1968 Olympics
8th U.S. Olympic Team – 5.5 Meter.
Team Meteorologist
Vintage Yachting Games
5th 2012 Italy – Soling.
1979 Pan American Games
Gold 1979 U.S. Pan-American Team – Soling.
European Championship Soling
2nd 2011 Austria.
National Championships in Soling
Winner 1973 Switzerland
Winner 1983 Switzerland
Winner 1987 Switzerland
Winner 1988 Austria
Winner 1988 Hungary
Winner 2003 United States
Winner 2003 Netherlands
Winner 2007 Scotland
International 14
Member U.S. International Teams 1961, 1963, 1965, 1967, 1969 and 1971
Winner 1961 Princess Elizabeth Trophy (1st American ever) – Bermuda
Winner 1962 Buzzard's Bay Bowl
Winner 1964 Prince of Wales Cup (1st American ever) – Lowestoft, United Kingdom
Winner 1966 Yachting Magazine's One-of-a-Kind Regatta
Soling
Winner 1973 Great Lakes Championship
Winner 1973 Maritime Provinces Championship
Winner 1974 Atlantic Coast Championship
Winner 1982 Australian Gold Cup Australia
Winner 1984 Erich Hirt Trophy Germany
Winner 1984 Jungfrau Trophy Switzerland
Winner 1985 Jungfrau Trophy Switzerland
Winner 1988 European Lakes Cup
Winner 1992 Erich Hirt Trophy Germany
Ice Bowl (Annapolis)
Winner 1955–2011 – (32 times out of 58)

== Bibliography ==
Walker contributed to the sailing world by writing over ten books on sports in general and on sailing specifically:

- The Techniques of Small Boat Racing OCLC 8003492
- The Tactics of Small Boat Racing ISBN 9780393308013
- Performance Advances in Small Boat Racing OCLC 10881
- Wind and Strategy ISBN 9780393031362
- Advanced Racing Tactics ISBN 9780393031843
- Winning: The Psychology of Competition ISBN 9780393032550
- A Manual of Sailtrim ISBN 0393032965
- Positioning: The Logic of Sailboat Racing ISBN 0393033392
- The Sailors's Wind ISBN 9780393338409
- The Code of Competition ISBN 9780970357113
- Travels with Thermopylae ISBN 9780970357120

Sporting positions
Preceded by (United States) Sam Merrick	President International Soling Association; 1991 - 1994	Succeeded by (Hungary) György Wossala
