= Severn Sailing Association =

Private yacht club located in Annapolis, Maryland, US

- Burgee
- Short name: SSA
- Founded: 1954
- Location: 311 First St., Annapolis, Maryland 21403
- Website: www.severnsailing.org

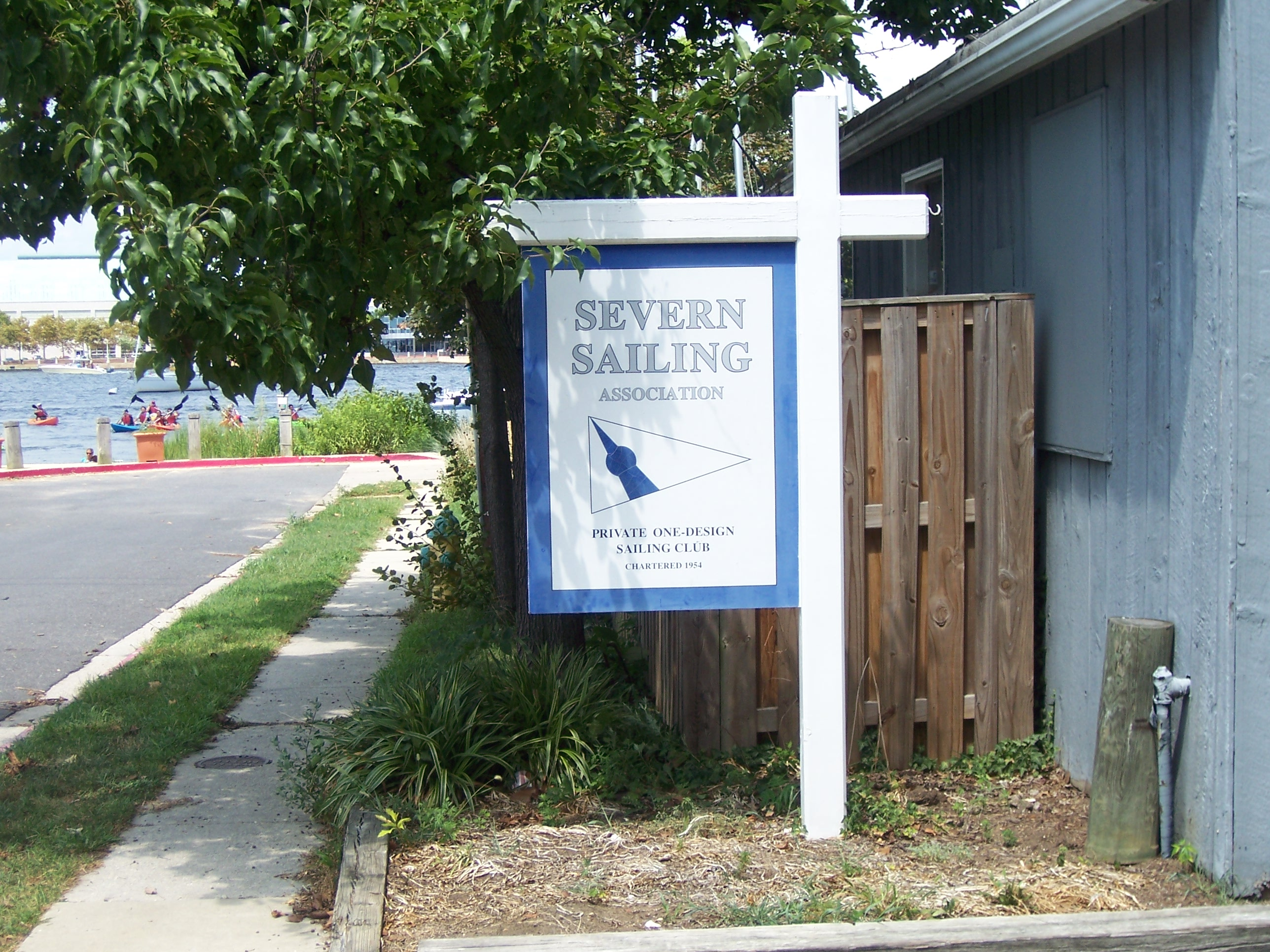
Entrance sign.

The Severn Sailing Association is a private yacht club located in Annapolis, Maryland.

== History ==
The Association was incorporated on October 28, 1954, by John J. Hopkins, Richard C. Bartlett, and Robert F. Podlich who wanted to establish a sailing club on Round Bay, Severna Park. But due to local zoning laws such an establishment was prohibited, so the search was extended all over the Severn River. Finally, three cottages on the water at the end of First Street in Eastport were bought and in 1958, a dock was constructed and the boats of the five initial centerboard fleets (Penguins, Comets, National One-Designs, Severn One-Designs and International 14's) were launched.

== Mission ==
- To promote, foster, encourage, and sponsor one-design sailing, sailing races and activities connected with sailing on the Severn River.
- To promote the education of the youth of the surrounding communities in the sport of sailing and the safe and proper handling of small craft.
- To promote and encourage local participation in regional and national sailing activities
- To cooperate with and participate in the activities of the various community organizations and civic associations dedicated to the preservation and improvement of the Severn River area.
- To promote the preservation and observance of the "Rules of the Road", yachting customs and courtesies.
- To conduct social occasions for sailors and advocates of sailing.

== Fleets ==
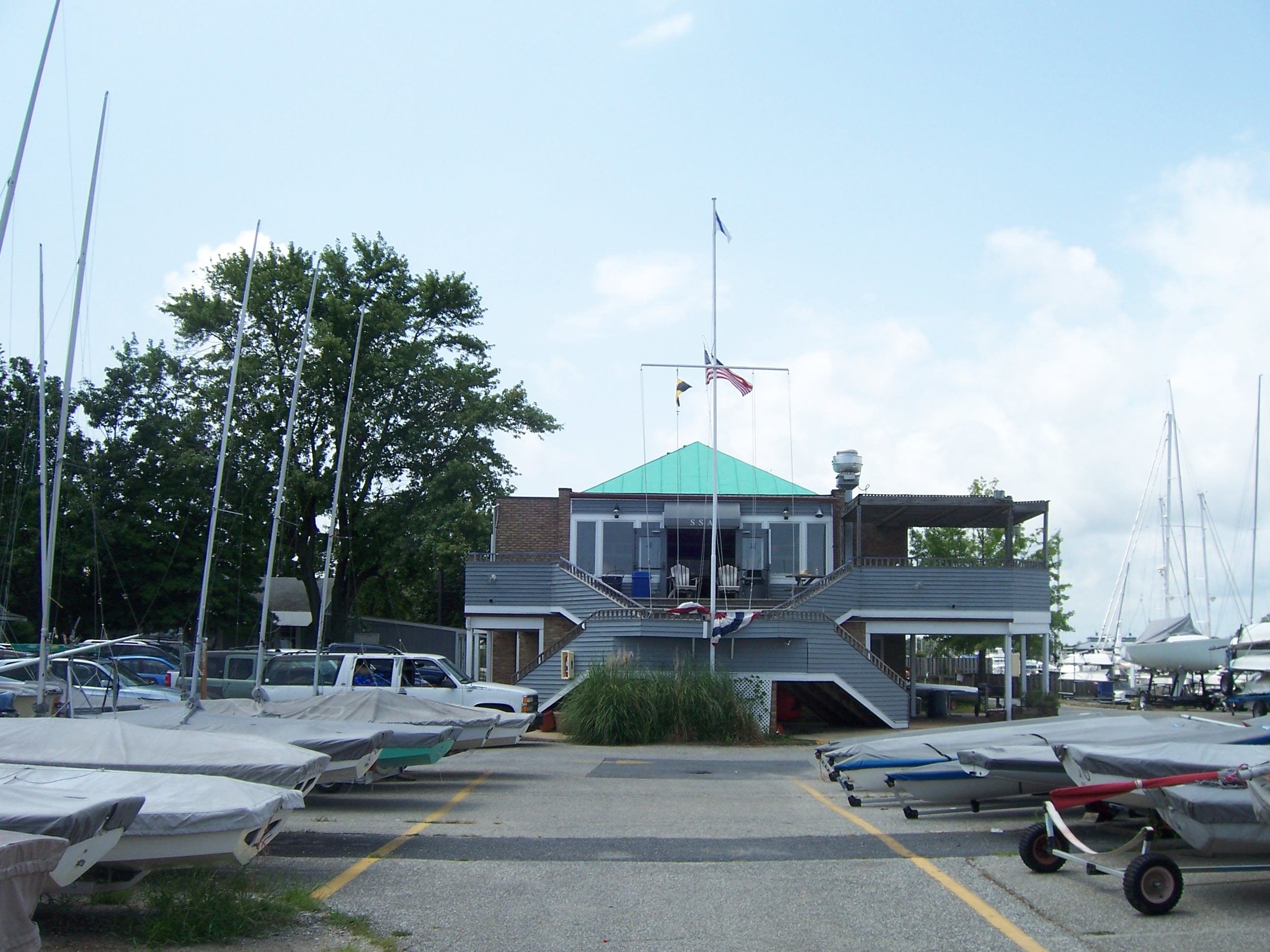
Clubhouse.

One-Design racing club fleets include:

- Day Sailer
- ILCA 6/7
- J/22
- J/24
- J/70
- Lightning
- Snipe
- Soling
- Star
- Thistle

== Major Regattas ==
- 1960 Adams Cup
- 1971 Snipe US Nationals
- 1978 Snipe North American Championship
- 1981 Snipe US Nationals
- 1984 International 420 World Championship
- 1985 Snipe North American Championship
- 1989 Soling North American Championship
- 1990 Snipe US Nationals
- 1991 Lightning World Championship
- 1992 J24 World Championship
- 1994 Interclub Nationals
- 1994 Snipe North American Championship
- 1995 Laser US Nationals
- 1999 Interclub Nationals
- 2000 Soling North American Championship
- 2000 Lightning North American Championship
- 2005 Optimist US Team Trials
- 2005 Laser Masters National Championship
- 2006 Interclub Nationals
- 2010 Snipe US Nationals
- 2013 Interclub Nationals
- 2016 Snipe North American Championship
- 2017 5o5 World Championship
- 2021 Snipe US Nationals
- 2022 Soling North American Championship

== Commodores ==
- 2024- Bill Krafft
- 2023-2024 Bruce Empey
- 2021-2022 Eric Johnson
- 2019-2020 Jonathan Phillips
- 2017-2018 Kim Couranz
- 2015-2016 Peter Rich
- 2013-2014 David Koepper
- 2011-2012 Hal Whitacre
- 2009-2010 Luke Shingledecker
- 2007-2008 Joe Van Gieson
- 2005-2006 Ted Morgan
- 2003-2004 Alex Stout
- 2001-2002 John Quay
- 1999-2000 Tim Cusack
- 1997-1998 Peter Hale
- 1995-1996 Dina Kowalyshyn
- 1993-1994 Griff Hall
- 1991-1992 Steve Palmer
- 1989-1990 Paul Weiss
- 1987-1988 Chuck Millican
- 1985-1986 Tom Davies
- 1983-1984 Mark Hasslinger
- 1981-1982 Larry White
- 1979-1980 Jim Laudeman
- 1977-1978 Jack Colwell
- 1975-1976 Eric Arens
- 1973-1974 Sam Merrick
- 1971-1972 Richard C. Bartlett Jr.
- 1968-1970 Robert Reeves
- 1966-1967 Crombie Garrett
- 1964-1965 Robert Tate
- 1963 Stuart H. Walker
- 1962 Pharo Gagge
- 1957-1961 Stuart H. Walker
- 1955-1956 John J. Hopkins

== Sailors ==
- Don Cohan, 1972 Olympic Bronze Medalist.
- Sam Merrick, former chairman of the United States Olympic yachting committee.
- Stuart Walker, National Sailing Hall of Fame 2013 inductee.
- Carol Cronin and Kim Couranz, 2018 Women's Snipe World Champions.
