= Breck Marshall =

Coordinates: 41°21′41″N 71°57′52″W

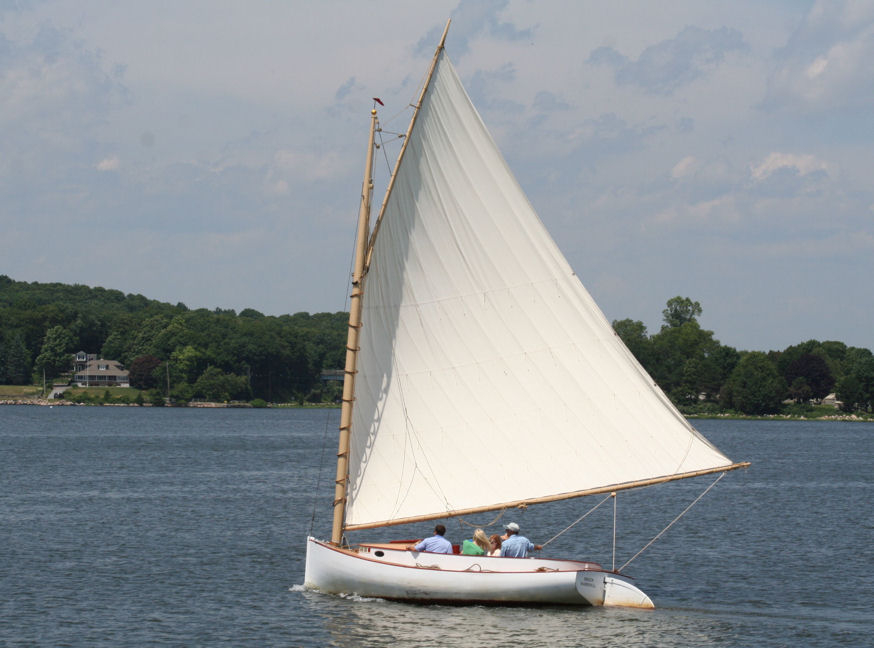
- Catboat Brek Marshall

History
- Name: Breck Marshall
- Builder: Mystic Seaport Museum, in Mystic, Connecticut
- Completed: 1987
- Status: Museum ship at Mystic Seaport Museum in Mystic, Connecticut

General characteristics
- Type: Cape Cod catboat
- Length: 20 ft (6.1 m)
- Beam: 10 ft (3.0 m)
- Propulsion: Sail

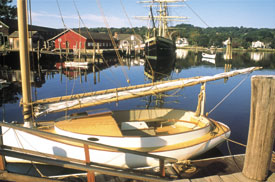
Breck Marshall

Breck Marshall is sailboat museum ship of the Mystic Seaport Museum in Mystic, Connecticut. The Mystic Seaport Museum built Breck Marshall as reproduction of a Cape Cod catboat in 1987. The Breck Marshall is 20 ft (6.1 m) long and is typical of boats built around 1900. Catboats were used for fishing and for pleasure trips. Breck Marshall was the president of Marshall Marine, a catboat builder. Breck Marshall and Marshall Marine funded Catboat Association that funded the building of the Breck Marshall. The Breck Marshall sails the upper Mystic River in warm months.

== See also ==
- List of museum ships in North America
