= Cape Cod Frosty =

One-design racing dinghy

Development
- Designer: Thomas Leach
- Location: United States
- Year: 1984
- No. built: 1,000
- Builder: Homebuilt boat
- Role: Sailing dinghy
- Name: Cape Cod Frosty

Boat
- Displacement: 34 lb (15 kg)
- Draft: 3.00 ft (0.91 m) with daggerboard down

Hull
- Type: Monohull
- Construction: Fiberglass or wood
- LOA: 6.33 ft (1.93 m)
- Beam: 2.76 ft (0.84 m)

Hull appendages
- Keel: daggerboard
- Ballast: water ballast in plastic bottles for class rules
- Rudder: transom-mounted rudder

Rig
- Rig type: Cat rig

Sails
- Sailplan: Catboat
- Mainsail area: 25.00 sq ft (2.323 m^{2})
- Total sail area: 25.00 sq ft (2.323 m^{2})

The Cape Cod Frosty is a one-design racing dinghy. It was conceived for post-season "frostbite racing", when racing keelboats have been hauled out for the winter. It is supported by the Cape Cod Frosty Class Association.

It was first built in 1984. The first class championship regatta was held in Hyannis, Massachusetts in 1985. As of 2001 there were 15 fleets racing the design in the eastern United States and Canada, plus an annual North American Championship.

It has a pram hull with no chines or internal framing and one bulkhead. It has a nearly plumb stem, a vertical transom, a transom-hung rudder controlled by a tiller with an extension and a retractable daggerboard. It has a draft of 3.00 ft (0.91 m) with the daggerboard down. It is equipped with flotation bags. Class rules require ballasting with water-filled plastic jugs to a combined boat and crew weight of 214 lb (97 kg).

It features an unstayed catboat single sail rig. A boom vang, Cunningham and mainsheet traveler are optional.

It is usually amateur constructed from plans in the eastern United States and Canada. It is usually built of wood, using two 4 by 8 ft (1.2 by 2.4 m) sheets of 0.25 in (6.4 mm) plywood and assembled using stitch and glue. Some production boats were built from fiberglass by Sailpower Corp and Star Marine. More than 1,000 boats have been completed.
