= Sam Merrick =

Sailor from the United States

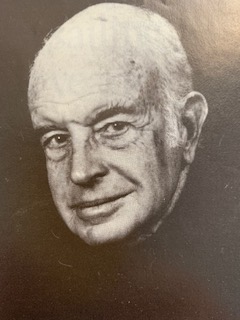
- Former president of the International Soling Association

Personal information
- Full name: Samuel Vaughn Merrick
- Nationality: United States
- Born: March 24, 1914 Bala Cynwyd, Pennsylvania,
- Died: April 17, 2000 (aged 86) Medford, New Jersey

Sailing career
- Sport: Sailing
- College team: University of Pennsylvania graduated in 1940
- Club: Severn Sailing Association
- Class(es): Thistle, E-Scow, Soling
- Updated on 24 March 2020

Samuel Vaughn Merrick (born 24 March 1914, Bala Cynwyd, Pennsylvania - 17 April 2000, Medford, New Jersey) was a sailor and preeminent labor lawyer under Presidents Kennedy and Johnson from the United States.

== Personal life ==
In 1947, Merrick was married to Eleanor Perry of Dover, Massachusetts. The couple has three son's John, Gregory and Tad. Sam earned a Bachelor's degree in engineering in 1937 and a law degree in 1940, both from the University of Pennsylvania.

== Professional life ==
Merrick retired in 1977, after working 35 years in labor and Congressional relations. He was a preeminent labor lawyer under Presidents Kennedy and Johnson.

== Sailing ==
Merrick was an accomplished sailor in one-design sailboat races since 1926. He won twice the E-scow Nationals (once in the 1930s and once in the 1980s). In his Soling years he had an intense rivalry and friendship with Stuart H. Walker. After his retirement Merrick became the (unsalaried) director of the United States Olympic yachting committee. In 1980, he added the title of chairman. He prepared the American Olympic team until the 1980 Summer Olympics boycott. After that disappointment for the US sailors Sam started to get sailors to be engaged for competing in the 1984 Olympics. Merrick's team was able to win a medal in every of the seven Olympic classes (three gold and four silver Medailles. For this he was awarded the most prestigious award in American sailing, the Nathaniel G. Herreshoff Trophy, in 1984. Sam was president of the International Soling Association from 1987 - 1990.

== Death ==
Sam died at the age of 86 as result of pancreatic cancer at his house in Medford, New Jersey.

Sporting positions
Preceded by (Germany) Karl Haist	President International Soling Association; 1987 - 1990	Succeeded by (United States) Stuart H. Walker
