= PlastiGlass =

Sailboat builder

- Company type: Privately held company
- Industry: Boat building
- Founded: 1950
- Founder: Barney Lehman
- Defunct: 1955
- Fate: bought out by WD Schock in 1955
- Headquarters: United States
- Products: Sailboats

The PlastiGlass Company (usually just called PlastiGlass) was an American boat builder based in California. The company was an early pioneer in the design and manufacture of fiberglass sailboats.

The company was founded by boat designer Barney Lehman in 1950 and sold to WD Schock in 1955, becoming part of the nucleus of the WD Schock Corp.

== History ==
Lehman started building his first design, the Lehman 10 cat rigged sailing dinghy, also called the Lehman Interclub, in 1948, before the founding of his company two years later. The Interclub was chosen as the one-design racer for a US-Mexico inter-club competitive regatta that was held in Acapulco in February, 1952, which included the sponsorship of the Mexican government.

The slightly larger Lehman 12, also a cat-rigged dinghy, was later developed into the longer Lehman 14. After WD Schock purchased the company in 1955, that design was developed into the commercially successful Lido 14, with 6,100 boats built.

== Boats ==
Summary of boats built by PlastiGlass:

- Lehman 10
- Lehman 12
- Lehman 14
- Lehman Interclub

== See also ==
- List of sailboat designers and manufacturers
