= Lido 14 =

Sailboat class

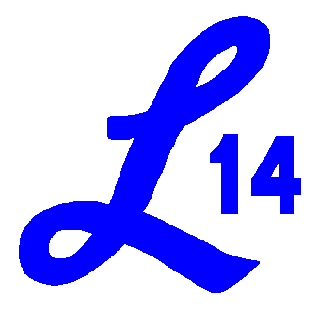
- Class symbol

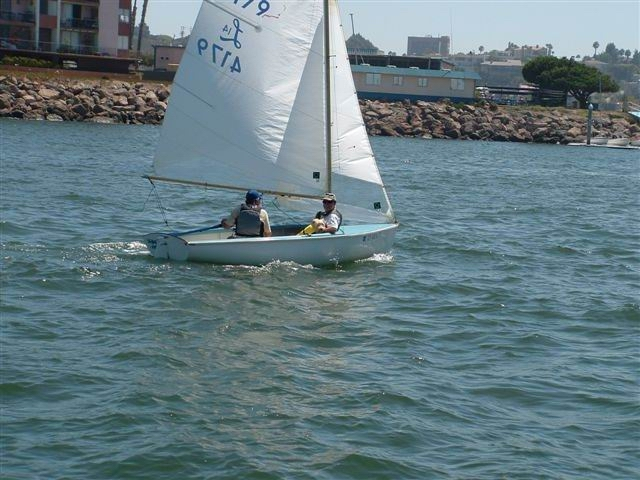

Development
- Designer: Barney Lehman and William D. Schock
- Location: United States
- Year: 1958
- No. built: 6100
- Builder: W. D. Schock Corp
- Name: Lido 14

Boat
- Crew: two
- Displacement: 310 lb (141 kg)
- Draft: 4.25 ft (1.30 m) with the centerboard down

Hull
- Type: Monohull
- Construction: Fiberglass
- LOA: 14.00 ft (4.27 m)
- LWL: 13.75 ft (4.19 m)
- Beam: 6.00 ft (1.83 m)

Hull appendages
- Keel: centerboard
- Rudder: transom-mounted rudder

Rig
- Rig type: Bermuda rig

Sails
- Sailplan: Fractional rigged sloop
- Mainsail area: 76 sq ft (7.1 m^{2})
- Jib/genoa area: 35 sq ft (3.3 m^{2})
- Total sail area: 111 sq ft (10.3 m^{2})

Racing
- D-PN: 99.6

The Lido 14 is an American sailing dinghy that was designed by Barney Lehman and William D. Schock and first built in 1958.

The design was derived from the Lehman 14.

== Production ==
The design is built by W. D. Schock Corp in the United States. When it was introduced it became a quick commercial success, with 1,000 boats completed in the first three years and almost 3,000 by 1970. The success of the design was instrumental in the company expanding to become a major builder of sailboats. A total of 6,100 boats have been completed and it remains in production.

== Design ==
The Lido 14 is a recreational sailboat, built predominantly of fiberglass, with wood trim. It has a fractional sloop rig, with gold-colored anodized aluminum spars and a loose-footed mainsail. The hull features a spooned plumb stem, a near-vertical transom, a transom-hung rudder controlled by a tiller and a retractable centerboard that is raised with stainless steel straps. Both the rudder and centerboard are made from foam-cored fiberglass. It displaces 310 lb (141 kg) and has positive flotation under the seats and in the bow compartment.

In 1995 the boat was redesigned with a new two-piece mold to simplify construction, plus many other changes.

The boat has a draft of 4.25 ft (1.30 m) with the centerboard extended and 5 in (13 cm) with it retracted, allowing beaching or ground transportation on a trailer.

For sailing the design is equipped with a 2:1 mechanical advantage outhaul and a boom vang. The jib has a pad eye for a whisker pole, which is a factory option, along with hiking straps.

The design is used as a one-design racer and has a Portsmouth Yardstick racing average handicap of 99.6. It has a large cockpit that can accommodate six adults, but it is raced with a crew of two sailors.

== Operational history ==
In a 1994 review Richard Sherwood described the boat as a "child's boat, racer and sailer. The Lido 14 evolved from the earlier Lehman 14 via a rather complete redesign including sheer, seats, foredeck, and sail plan. The cockpit length allows for six adults on full-length seats. The seats, with a bow compartment, provide flotation. Only limited modifications are allowed for racing, as the intention is to keep Lido a simple, limited boat."

== See also ==
- List of sailing boat types
