= Catboat =

Type of sailboat

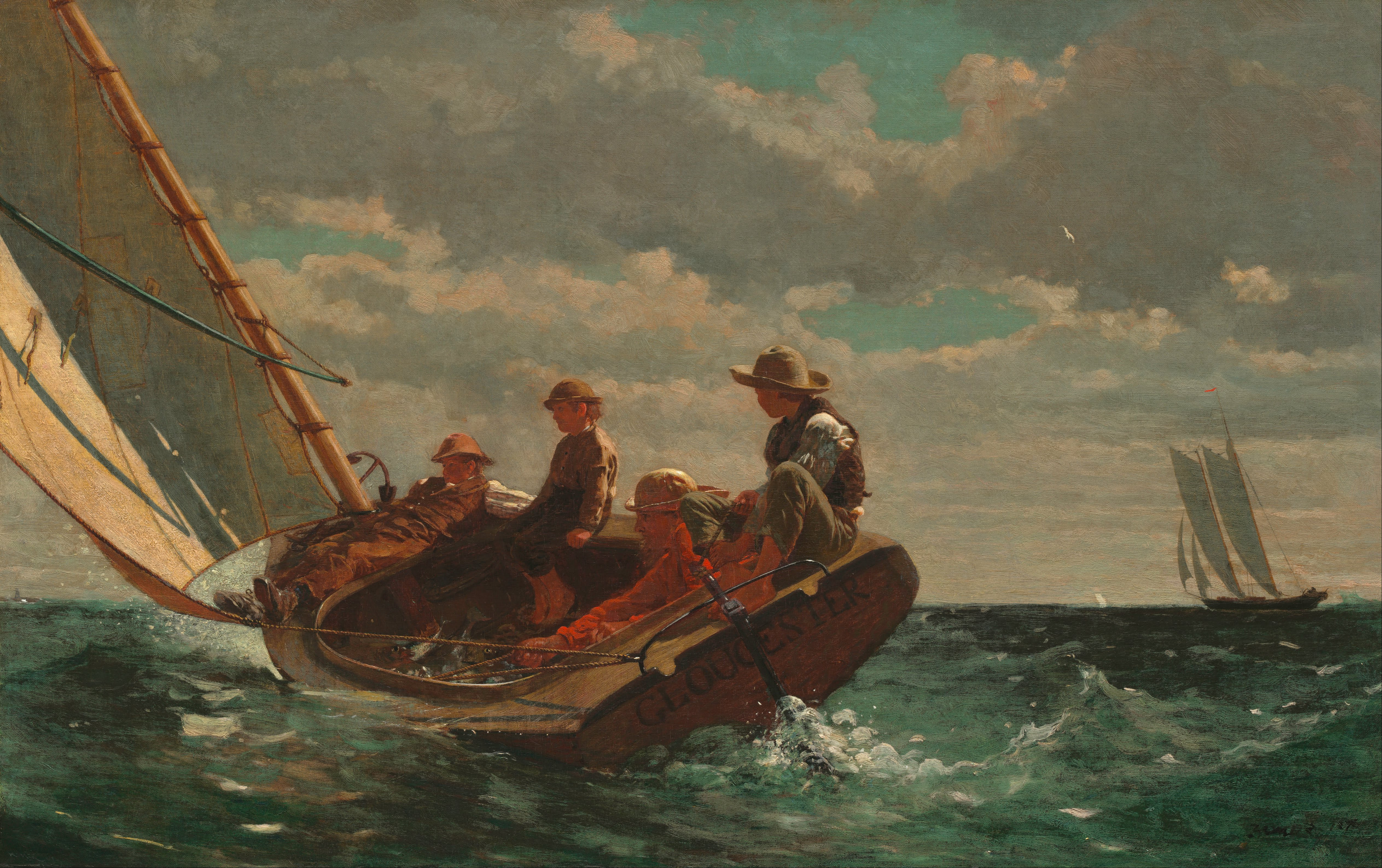
Winslow Homer's 1870s painting Breezing Up (A Fair Wind)

A catboat (alternate spelling: cat boat) is a sailboat with a single sail on a single mast set well forward in the bow of a very beamy and (usually) shallow draft hull. Typically they are gaff rigged, though Bermuda rig is also used. Most are fitted with a centreboard, although some have a keel. The hull can be 3.7 to 12.2 metres (12 to 40 ft) long with a beam half as wide as the hull length at the waterline. The type is mainly found on that part of the Eastern seaboard of the USA from New Jersey to Massachusetts.

Advantages of this sail plan include the economies derived from a rig with a limited number of component parts. It is quick to hoist sail and get underway. The cat rig sails well to windward, especially in calmer water. As a working boat, the forward mast placement gave ample room in the cockpit for fishing gear. Cruising versions can provide a large usable cabin space in a relatively short hull.

Disadvantages of the rig include the limited deck space around the mast, which can be problematical when raising or lowering sail, or when reefing; halyards are often led back to the cockpit, partially mitigating this problem. It is usually wise to reef early in a rising wind to avoid an excess of weather helm. The weight of the mast in the bow has to be allowed for in the hull design – if this is got wrong the bow may be "buried" when sailing downwind. The narrow beam where the mast is stepped makes it difficult to gain any benefit from shrouds, so the mast has to be stronger, and so heavier. Despite the simplicity of the rig, a good level of skill is required to design a balanced catboat, since there are limited options to correct any slight errors.

Some catboat one-design classes in current use include the Beetle Cat, the Redden Catboat, the Nonsuch, the Inland Cat, the Zijlsloep, the Cape Cod Cat, Com-Pac Trailerable, Marshall, Menger, and the APBY cat boat.

From the 1850s to the early 1900s catboats were the dominant inshore boat on the New England coast, both for work and for pleasure. They were used for fishing and coastal transportation. Their popularity declined in the commercial world where they were replaced by motorized boats. In boat racing the tendency was for larger sails, which favored other rigging styles.

A typical New England style has a very long boom that extends over the transom and may carry foresails stayed from a bowsprit.

== History ==
Around the turn of the 20th century, catboats were adapted for racing, and long booms and gaffs, bowsprits and large jibs were fitted to capture as much wind as possible. The decline of racing and advent of small, efficient gasoline engines eliminated the need for large sail plans, and catboats today are used as pleasure craft for day sailing and cruising, and have the virtues of roominess, stability and simple handling.

It is generally accepted that the origin of the catboat type was in New York around 1840 and from there spread east and south as the virtues of the type — simplicity, ease of handling, shallow draft, large capacity — were discovered. Historically, they were used for fishing and transport in the coastal waters around Cape Cod, Narragansett Bay, New York and New Jersey. Some were fitted with bowsprits for swordfishing and others were used as 'party boats' with canvas-sided, wood-framed summer cabins that could be rolled up.

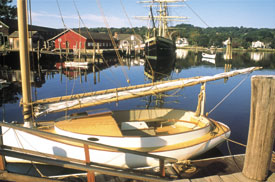
The Breck Marshall, a 20-foot (6.1 m) Crosby catboat design open for public use at Mystic Seaport

One of the most well-known catboats is the 12-foot (3.7 m) Beetle Cat daysailer. Fleets of these one-design boats are found in harbors all across New England, often competing in races. In the 1960s, Breck Marshall based his 18-foot (5.5 m) fiberglass Sanderling upon an existing, wooden design. The Sanderling has since become a very popular boat, with more than 700 built, and it has helped to rekindle interest in the catboat. To honor Marshall and his contribution to the type, the Catboat Association funded the construction of the Breck Marshall, a 20-foot (6.1 m) catboat built and berthed at Mystic Seaport.

== Features ==
Designer Fenwick Williams summarized the original design philosophy as: "The ample beam made the use of stone ballast feasible … the high bow provided good support for the unstayed mast … the barn door rudder provided adequate strength … high coamings served to keep water out of the large open cockpit … side decks provided a handy ledge on which to set a lobster trap."

Modern catboat enthusiasts value the vessel’s traditional design and appearance, along with features that make it a versatile recreational boat: simplicity, spacious capacity, shallow draft, stability, and safety.

== Catboats in Europe ==
=== Great Britain and Ireland ===
In 1851, during the Great Exhibition, a Catboat called 'The Una' was put on display at The Serpentine lake in Hyde Park, London. She was seen by Dixon Kemp who was much impressed with her. After 'Una' sailed at Cowes on the Isle of Wight, she impressed many of the sailors who built a fleet of them. After 1907 'Una' raced at the Upper Thames yacht Club.

In Bray, County Wicklow in Ireland a fleet of one-design catboats, 3.7 m (12 ft) in length and 1.8 m (6 ft) beam were designed and built in 1897, and they continued to race for several years at home and at local east coast regattas.

== Gallery ==
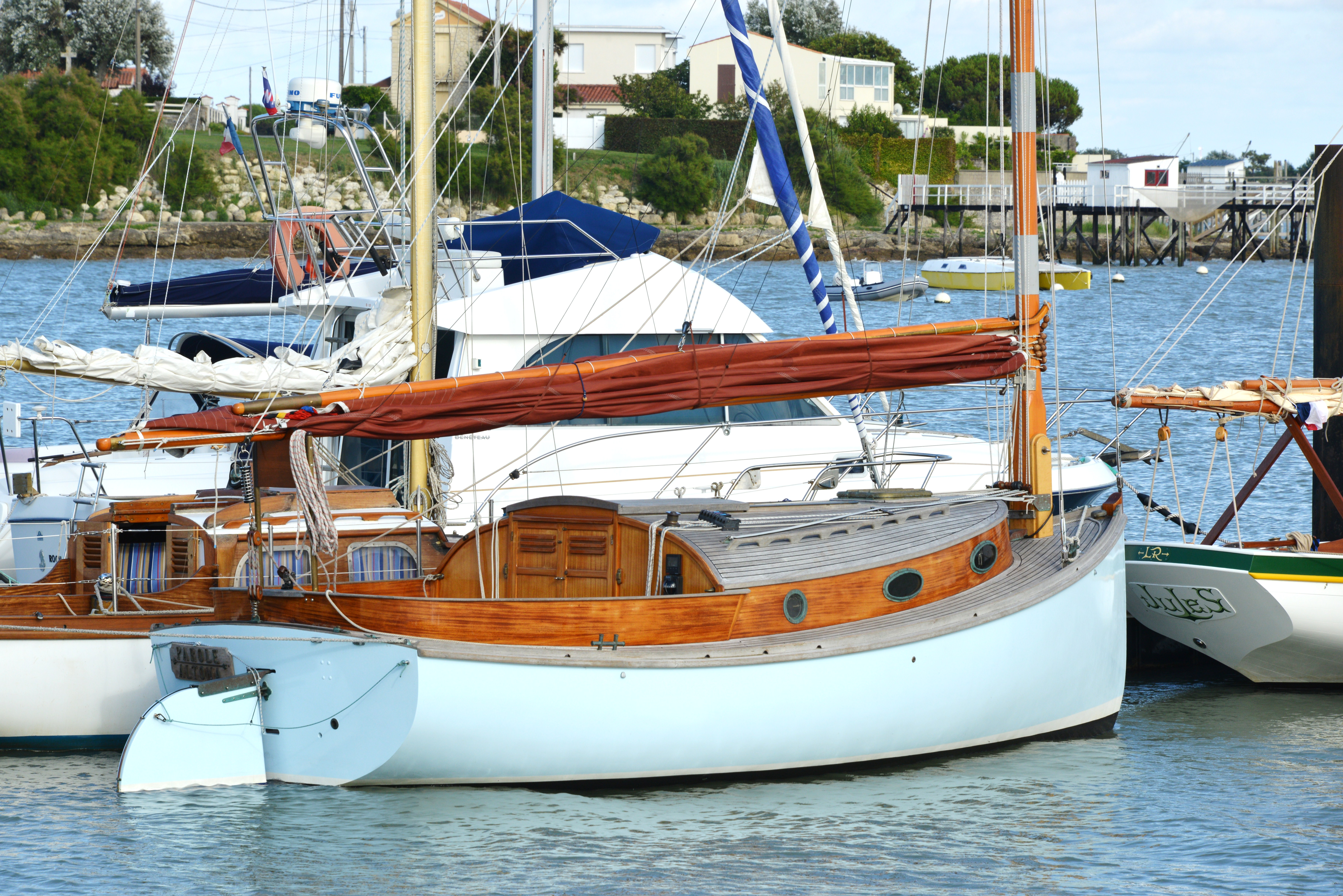
Cruising catboat showing classical rudder design and wire stays supporting the mast

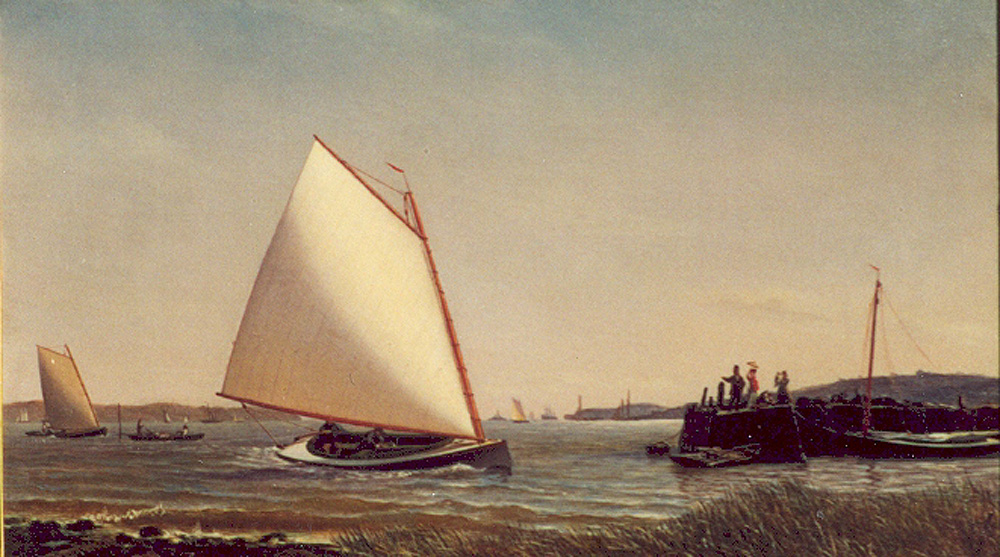
Painting "Oyster Bay Catboats" (circa 1865) by Archibald Cary Smith

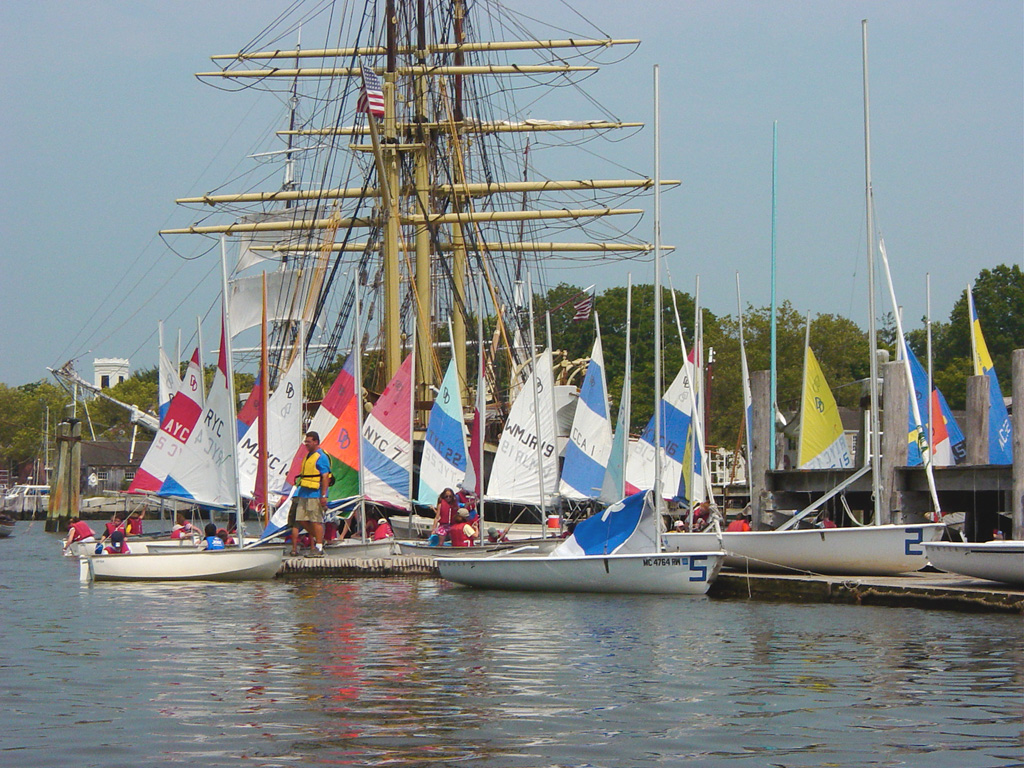
Catboats with Bermuda rig

== See also ==
- Beetle Cat, a small "daysailer" catboat
- Nonsuch, a series of 5.5–11.0 m (18–36 ft) modern catboats
- Inland Cat, 4.4 m (14 1/2 ft), designed and built in Northern Indiana.
- Snark sailboat, a lightweight, two-person catboat
