= List of freguesias of Portugal: N =

The freguesias (civil parishes) of Portugal are listed in by municipality according to the following format:

- concelho
  - freguesias

== Nazaré ==
- Famalicão
- Nazaré
- Valado dos Frades

== Nelas ==
- Aguieira
- Canas de Senhorim
- Carvalhal Redondo
- Lapa do Lobo
- Moreira
- Nelas
- Santar
- Senhorim
- Vilar Seco

== Nisa ==
- Alpalhão
- Amieira do Tejo
- Arez e Amieira do Tejo
- Espírito Santo, Nossa Senhora da Graça e São Simão
- Montalvão
- Santana
- Tolosa

== Nordeste (Azores) ==
- Achada
- Achadinha
- Algarvia
- Lomba da Fazenda
- Nordeste
- Salga
- Santana
- Santo António de Nordestinho
- São Pedro de Nordestinho
