= Nordestinho =

Former civil parish

Coordinates: 37.85°N 25.2°W

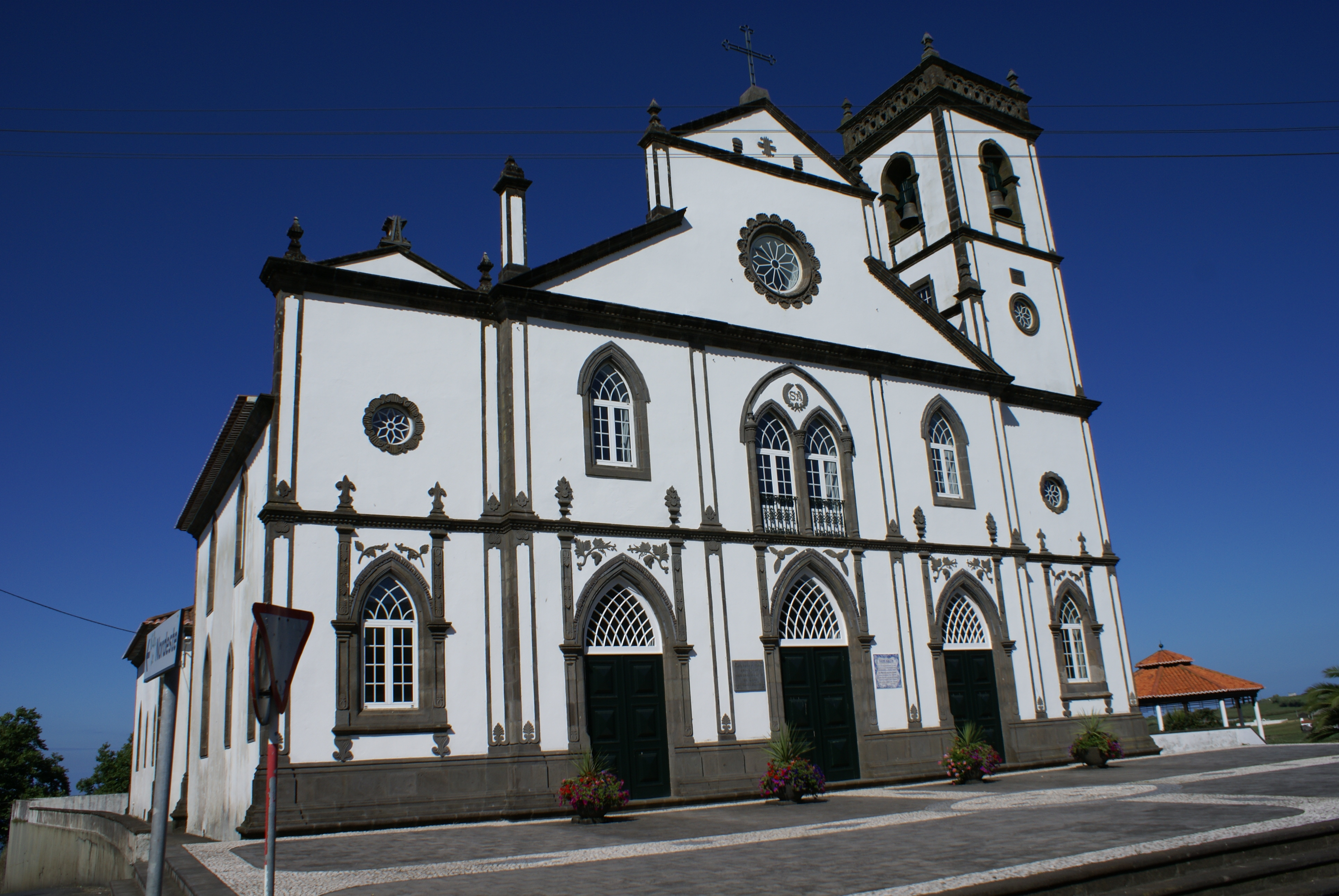
Church of Santo António do Nordestinho

Nordestinho was a civil parish in the municipality of Nordeste in the Azores. Its area was 25.43 km². It was located between the parishes of Santana to the west and Lomba da Fazenda to the east. The parish ceased to exist on July 16, 2002 when it was divided into Algarvia, Santo António de Nordestinho and São Pedro de Nordestinho.
