= 1998–99 Terceira Divisão =

Terceira Divisão
- Season: 1998–99

The 1998–99 Terceira Divisão season was the 52nd season of the competition and the 9th season of recognised fourth-tier football in Portugal.

== Overview ==
The league was contested by 118 teams in 7 divisions of 10 to 18 teams.

== Terceira Divisão – Série A ==
Pos	Team	Pld	W	D	L	GF	GA	GD	Pts	Promotion or relegation
1	SC Vianense	34	22	6	6	86	37	+49	72	Promotion to Segunda Divisão
2	GD Joane	34	19	7	8	58	35	+23	64	Promotion to Segunda Divisão
3	CD Monção	34	17	10	7	55	36	+19	61	
4	SC Valenciano	34	15	11	8	46	35	+11	56	
5	FC Amares	34	15	7	12	49	43	+6	52	
6	CA Macedo de Cavaleiros	34	14	10	10	49	44	+5	52	
7	GD Pevidém	34	14	9	11	58	45	+13	51	
8	ADC Montalegre	34	15	6	13	52	53	−1	51	
9	Merelinense FC	34	14	8	12	49	40	+9	50	
10	GD Bragança	34	13	10	11	56	61	−5	49	
11	Águias Graça	34	13	8	13	38	42	−4	47	
12	Juventude Ronfe	34	14	3	17	48	48	0	45	
13	Vilaverdense FC	34	11	10	13	42	42	0	43	
14	Vieira SC	34	13	4	17	51	56	−5	43	
15	Neves FC	34	11	7	16	46	61	−15	40	Relegation to Distritais
16	SC Vila Pouca de Aguiar	34	9	5	20	35	64	−29	32	Relegation to Distritais
17	GD Mirandês	34	5	10	19	25	54	−29	25	Relegation to Distritais
18	GD Boticas	34	4	5	25	23	70	−47	17	Relegation to Distritais

== Terceira Divisão – Série B ==
Pos	Team	Pld	W	D	L	GF	GA	GD	Pts	Promotion or relegation
1	Canelas Gaia FC	34	23	7	4	71	28	+43	76	Promotion to Segunda Divisão
2	Vilanovense FC	34	20	7	7	60	27	+33	67	Promotion to Segunda Divisão
3	Dragões Sandinenses	34	17	9	8	67	44	+23	60	
4	FC Avintes	34	17	5	12	62	48	+14	56	
5	União Paredes	34	16	7	11	60	44	+16	55	
6	Fiães SC	34	15	6	13	51	45	+6	51	
7	SC Rio Tinto	34	14	8	12	42	47	−5	50	
8	AD Lousada	34	12	9	13	51	47	+4	45	
9	UD Valonguense	34	11	10	13	32	32	0	43	
10	SC Lamego	34	10	12	12	45	43	+2	42	
11	Pedrouços AC	34	11	8	15	54	61	−7	41	
12	SC Castêlo da Maia	34	11	8	15	42	46	−4	41	
13	Amarante FC	34	11	8	15	45	45	0	41	
14	GD Serzedelo	34	11	7	16	42	55	−13	40	
15	FC Tirsense	34	9	11	14	33	46	−13	38	Relegation to Distritais
16	AD São Pedro da Cova	34	10	7	17	44	65	−21	37	Relegation to Distritais
17	ADC Santa Marta de Penaguião	34	7	11	16	38	64	−26	32	Relegation to Distritais
18	CD Paços de Brandão	34	9	4	21	33	85	−52	31	Relegation to Distritais

== Terceira Divisão – Série C ==
Pos	Team	Pld	W	D	L	GF	GA	GD	Pts	Promotion or relegation
1	Oliveira do Bairro	34	21	8	5	70	27	+43	71	Promotion to Segunda Divisão
2	RD Águeda	34	19	9	6	65	41	+24	66	Promotion to Segunda Divisão
3	GD Mangualde	34	17	8	9	59	40	+19	59	
4	AD Fornos de Algodres	34	15	10	9	60	40	+20	55	
5	FC Cesarense	34	17	3	14	53	51	+2	54	
6	AA Avanca	34	14	10	10	54	48	+6	52	
7	GD São Roque	34	13	12	9	51	40	+11	51	
8	Anadia FC	34	13	9	12	53	47	+6	48	
9	SC Esmoriz	34	11	14	9	52	41	+11	47	
10	GD Tourizense	34	12	11	11	46	48	−2	47	
11	FC Oliveira do Hospital	34	10	14	10	48	45	+3	44	
12	AD Valecambrense	34	11	10	13	38	40	−2	43	
13	GD Mealhada	34	12	3	19	43	69	−26	39	
14	GD Oliveira de Frades	34	9	11	14	35	54	−19	38	
15	AD São Romão	34	10	7	17	38	46	−8	37	Relegation to Distritais
16	SC Penalva do Castelo	34	9	9	16	45	54	−9	36	Relegation to Distritais
17	CD Tondela	34	5	15	14	35	50	−15	30	Relegation to Distritais
18	SL Nelas	34	3	7	24	15	79	−64	16	Relegation to Distritais

== Terceira Divisão – Série D ==
Pos	Team	Pld	W	D	L	GF	GA	GD	Pts	Promotion or relegation
1	AC Marinhense	34	22	5	7	69	32	+37	71	Promotion to Segunda Divisão
2	SC Pombal	34	22	4	8	76	27	+49	70	Promotion to Segunda Divisão
3	CD Alcains	33	19	5	9	84	33	+51	62	
4	União Coimbra	34	18	6	10	67	38	+29	60	
5	Benfica Castelo Branco	34	17	5	12	64	56	+8	56	
6	Vitória Sernache	34	14	11	9	46	35	+11	53	
7	GDR Bidoeirense	34	15	7	12	59	58	+1	52	
8	GD Sourense	34	15	6	13	51	44	+7	51	
9	AC Alcanenense	34	14	7	13	50	47	+3	49	
10	AD Portomosense	34	13	8	13	58	48	+10	47	
11	UD Santarém	34	13	6	15	37	56	−19	45	
12	CA Riachense	34	10	12	12	41	44	−3	42	
13	AD Fazendense	34	12	6	16	36	53	−17	42	
14	UFCI Tomar	34	10	11	13	31	40	−9	41	
15	Sertanense FC	34	11	8	15	44	53	−9	41	Relegation to Distritais
16	GD Portalegrense	34	9	6	19	29	56	−27	33	Relegation to Distritais
17	UD Serra	33	8	2	23	41	76	−35	26	Relegation to Distritais
18	Os Marialvas	34	4	3	27	23	110	−87	15	Relegation to Distritais

== Terceira Divisão – Série E ==
Pos	Team	Pld	W	D	L	GF	GA	GD	Pts	Promotion or relegation
1	CD Ribeira Brava	34	21	8	5	59	24	+35	71	Promotion to Segunda Divisão
2	Águias Camarate	34	20	3	11	54	36	+18	63	Promotion to Segunda Divisão
3	CD Portosantense	34	17	10	7	62	36	+26	61	
4	GS Loures	34	14	12	8	45	31	+14	54	
5	GD Coruchense	34	15	8	11	47	35	+12	53	
6	1º Maio Sarilhense	34	14	10	10	45	36	+9	52	
7	CD Olivais e Moscavide	34	13	12	9	43	31	+12	51	
8	GD Samora Correia	34	13	10	11	50	51	−1	49	
9	CD São Vicente	34	12	12	10	49	41	+8	48	
10	Atlético Cacém	34	13	8	13	45	47	−2	47	
11	CD Mafra	34	13	8	13	48	45	+3	47	
12	SG Sacavenense	34	12	11	11	46	53	−7	47	
13	CF Benfica	34	11	10	13	29	33	−4	43	
14	GD Vialonga	34	9	8	17	30	45	−15	35	
15	Odivelas FC	34	9	7	18	39	50	−11	34	Relegation to Distritais
16	SL Olivais	34	6	10	18	29	52	−23	28	Relegation to Distritais
17	Calipolense Vila Viçosa	34	7	6	21	29	69	−40	27	Relegation to Distritais
18	GD Benavente	34	5	11	18	24	58	−34	26	Relegation to Distritais

== Terceira Divisão – Série F ==
Pos	Team	Pld	W	D	L	GF	GA	GD	Pts	Promotion or relegation
1	GD Sesimbra	34	18	12	4	57	29	+28	66	Promotion to Segunda Divisão
2	GD Alcochetense	34	20	6	8	72	43	+29	66	Promotion to Segunda Divisão
3	Estrela Vendas Novas	34	20	6	8	77	39	+38	66	
4	Lusitano Évora	34	16	16	2	61	33	+28	64	
5	GD Pescadores	34	18	7	9	52	29	+23	61	
6	Casa Pia AC	34	18	6	10	65	38	+27	60	
7	Lusitano VRSA	34	13	11	10	45	37	+8	50	
8	Vasco da Gama AC Sines	34	13	10	11	45	47	−2	49	
9	Esperança Lagos	34	13	7	14	48	47	+1	46	
10	SR Almancilense	34	11	13	10	41	47	−6	46	
11	GD Lagoa	34	12	8	14	52	59	−7	44	
12	Ourique DC	34	10	9	15	43	51	−8	39	
13	Palmelense FC	34	10	8	16	47	60	−13	38	
14	Almada AC	34	10	8	16	49	50	−1	38	
15	CD Montijo	34	9	7	18	36	51	−15	34	Relegation to Distritais
16	Padernense Clube	34	8	9	17	43	59	−16	33	Relegation to Distritais
17	FC Castrense	34	4	12	18	24	52	−28	24	Relegation to Distritais
18	FC Serpa	34	2	7	25	24	110	−86	13	Relegation to Distritais

== Terceira Divisão – Série Açores ==
Série Açores – Preliminary League Table

Pos	Team	Pld	W	D	L	GF	GA	GD	Pts
1	SC Lusitânia	18	13	2	3	52	14	+38	41
2	União Micaelense	18	12	2	4	46	16	+30	38
3	SC Praiense	18	9	3	6	26	16	+10	30
4	Águia DC	18	8	4	6	35	30	+5	28
5	FC Madalena	18	7	6	5	21	30	−9	27
6	CD Vila Franca	18	8	1	9	23	35	−12	25
7	SC. Ideal	18	2	10	6	14	25	−11	16
8	SC Vilanovense	18	4	4	10	16	30	−14	16
9	Juventude Lajense	18	3	6	9	17	42	−25	15
10	GD Minhocas	18	3	4	11	14	26	−12	13

Série Açores – Promotion Group

Pos	Team	Pld	W	D	L	GF	GA	GD	BP	Pts	Promotion
1	SC Lusitânia	8	8	0	0	23	4	+19	41	65	Promotion to Segunda Divisão
2	União Micaelense	8	3	0	5	18	12	+6	36	45	
3	SC Praiense	8	4	2	2	7	7	0	30	44	
4	Águia DC	8	2	1	5	8	19	−11	27	34	
5	FC Madalena	8	1	1	6	6	20	−14	27	31	

Terceira Divisão - Série Açores Relegation Group

Pos	Team	Pld	W	D	L	GF	GA	GD	BP	Pts	Relegation
1	CD Vila Franca	8	4	1	3	7	4	+3	25	38	
2	Juventude Lajense	8	4	2	2	11	6	+5	15	29	
3	SC Vilanovense	8	3	2	3	8	6	+2	16	27	Relegation to Distritais
4	SC Ideal	8	3	2	3	10	11	−1	16	27	Relegation to Distritais
5	CD St. Ant. Nordestinho (Note: GD Minhocas were replaced by CD St. Ant. Nordestinho at the Relegation Group stage.)	8	1	3	4	5	14	−9	14	20	Relegation to Distritais
