= Achadinha =

Civil parish in Nordeste

- Civil parish
- Location of the civil parish of Achandinha, within the municipality of Nordeste
- Coordinates: 37°50′59″N 25°17′11″W
- Country: Portugal
- Auton. region: Azores
- Island: São Miguel
- Municipality: Nordeste

Area
  - Total: 12.41 km^{2} (4.79 sq mi)
- Elevation: 173 m (568 ft)

Population (2011)
  - Total: 535
  - Density: 43.1/km^{2} (112/sq mi)
- Time zone: UTC−01:00 (AZOT)
  - Summer (DST): UTC+00:00 (AZOST)
- Postal code: 9630-043
- Area code: 292
- Patron: Nossa Senhora do Rosário
- Website: http://www.achadinha.net/

Achadinha (from Achada + diminutive -inha, meaning Little Achada) is a civil parish in the municipality of Nordeste on São Miguel Island in the Portuguese archipelago of the Azores. The population in 2011 was 535, in an area of 12.41 km^{2}.

== History ==
Achadinha is one of the oldest localities in the municipality of Nordeste, referred to by Gaspar Frutuoso in his chronicle, Saudades da Terra. The settlement of this region dates to the early colonization of the island, when a man from Serra da Estrela region of northern Portugal established a stake along the northern coast. This man constructed a farm and cleared a roadway, that grew to become the principal link to this parish.

Around the 16th century, Achadinha was inhabited by 123 people in 43 homes. During this century, a small temple was constructed to the invocation of Nossa Senhora do Rosário (Our Lady of the Rosary), which was served by its first vicar Pêro Vieira. By the end of the 19th century, the small chapel was substituted by a three-nave church.

Achadinha, during the 17th century, was still little more than a small settlement, distant and isolated from the great centres, such as Vila Franca do Campo and Ponta Delgada. This was a land where isolation was commonplace, the winters strong and the people lived off of the land. Many of the inhabitants walked barefoot, wearing shabby rags, made of linen, in a region that was distant from any other centre.

It was in Achadinha that Liberal forces disembarked during the Liberal Wars, under the command of the General Count of Vila Flor.

== Geography ==
Achadinha is located east of Ribeira Grande, along the northern coast of São Miguel, between its neighbours Salga in the west and Achada in the east. Located northeast of the island capital (Ponta Delgada) along the path of the Regional Roadway E.R.1-1ª, that encircles the island; it lies between the municipal seats of Nordeste and Ribeira Grande, with the central mountains towards the interior and the Atlantic Ocean to the north.

== Economy ==
Remotely, the inhabitants of the parish dedicated their work to the cultivation of wheat, corn, beets and potatoes. The parish diversified its activities, but deviated little from its agriculture and animal husbandry, with the production of milk and beef cattle.

== Architecture ==
- Church of Nossa Senhora do Rosário (Portuguese: Igreja Paroquial de Achadinha/Igreja de Nossa Senhora do Rosário), at the time of the 1522 earthquake, 123 people lived in the parish; it was at about this time that the church was established, with successive reconstructions occurring in 1568, 1830 and remodelled in 1882
