= São Pedro de Nordestinho =

- Civil parish
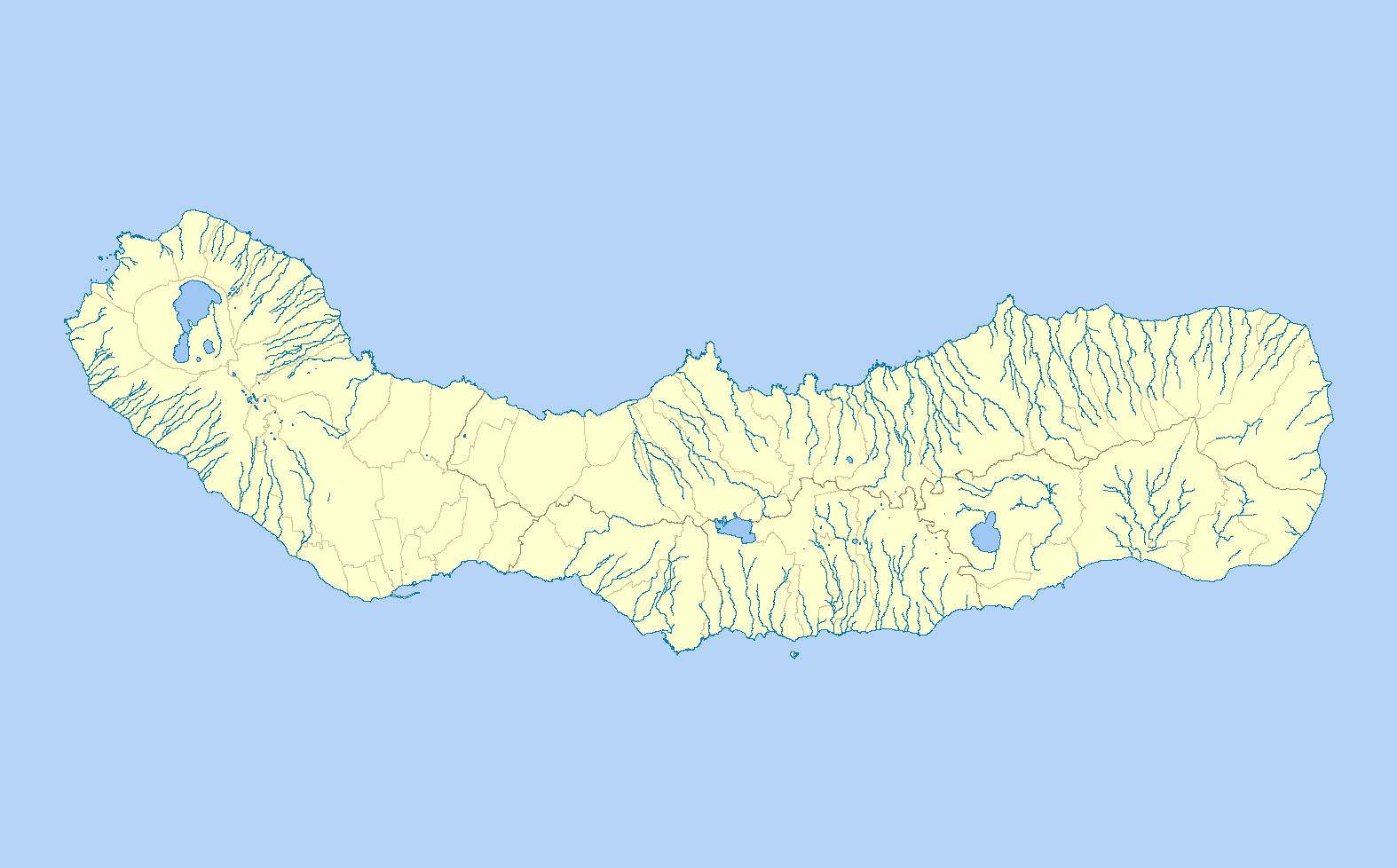
- Location in the Azores São Pedro de Nordestinho (São Miguel)
- Coordinates: 37°51′2″N 25°11′47″W
- Country: Portugal
- Auton. region: Azores
- Island: São Miguel
- Municipality: Nordeste
- Established: Civil parish: 2002

Area
  - Total: 12.09 km^{2} (4.67 sq mi)
- Elevation: 201 m (659 ft)

Population (2011)
  - Total: 273
  - Density: 23/km^{2} (58/sq mi)
- Time zone: UTC−01:00 (AZOT)
  - Summer (DST): UTC+00:00 (AZOST)
- Postal code: 9630-254
- Area code: 292

São Pedro de Nordestinho is a parish in the municipality of Nordeste in the Azores. It is located west of Nordeste. The population in 2011 was 273, in an area of 12.09 km². The parish was formed on July 16, 2002, when the parish of Nordestinho was split into the parishes Algarvia, Santo António de Nordestinho and São Pedro de Nordestinho. It contains the localities Assomada and São Pedro.
