= Santo António de Nordestinho =

- Civil parish
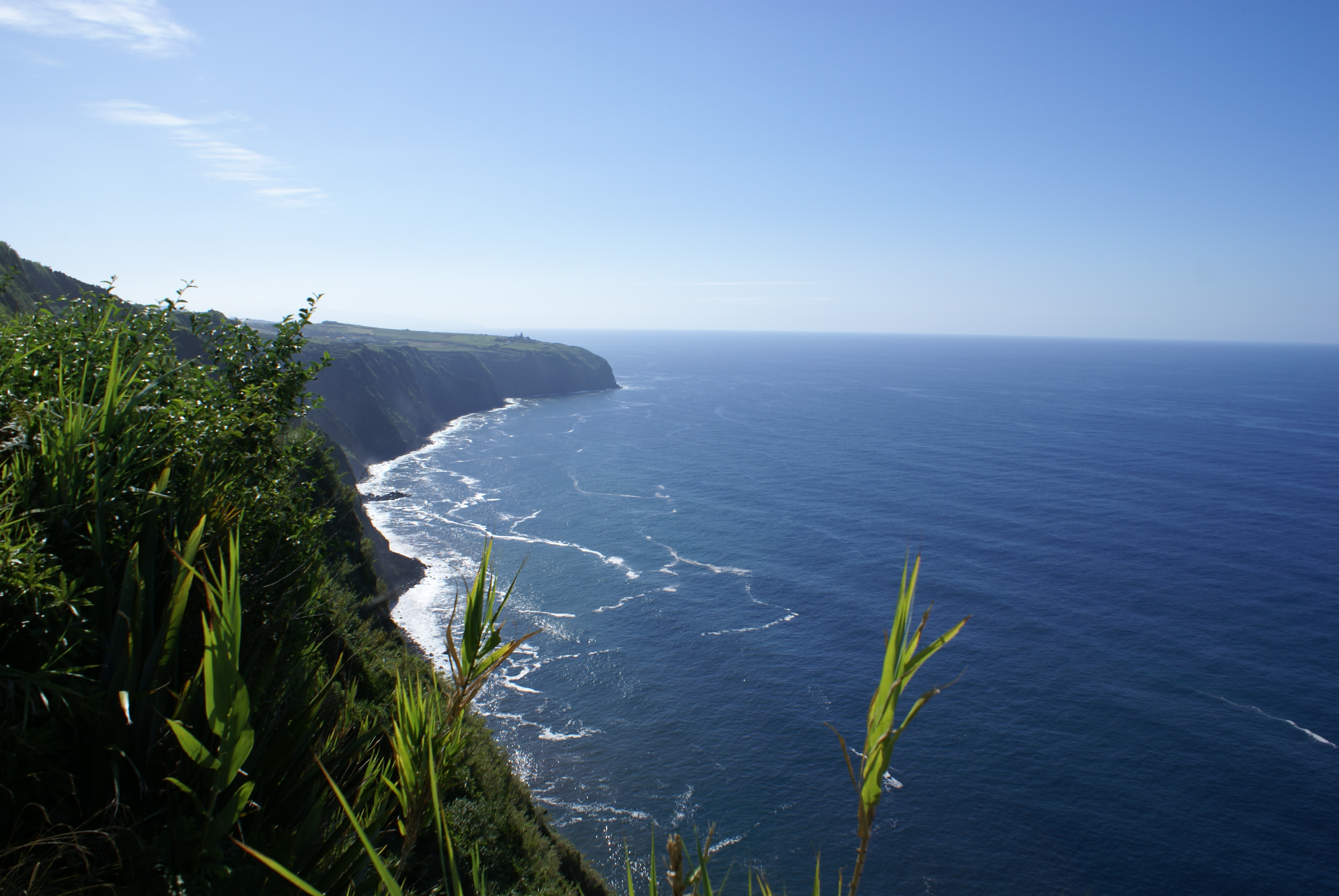
- The lookout at Despe-te Que Suas, along the northeast coast of Nordestinho

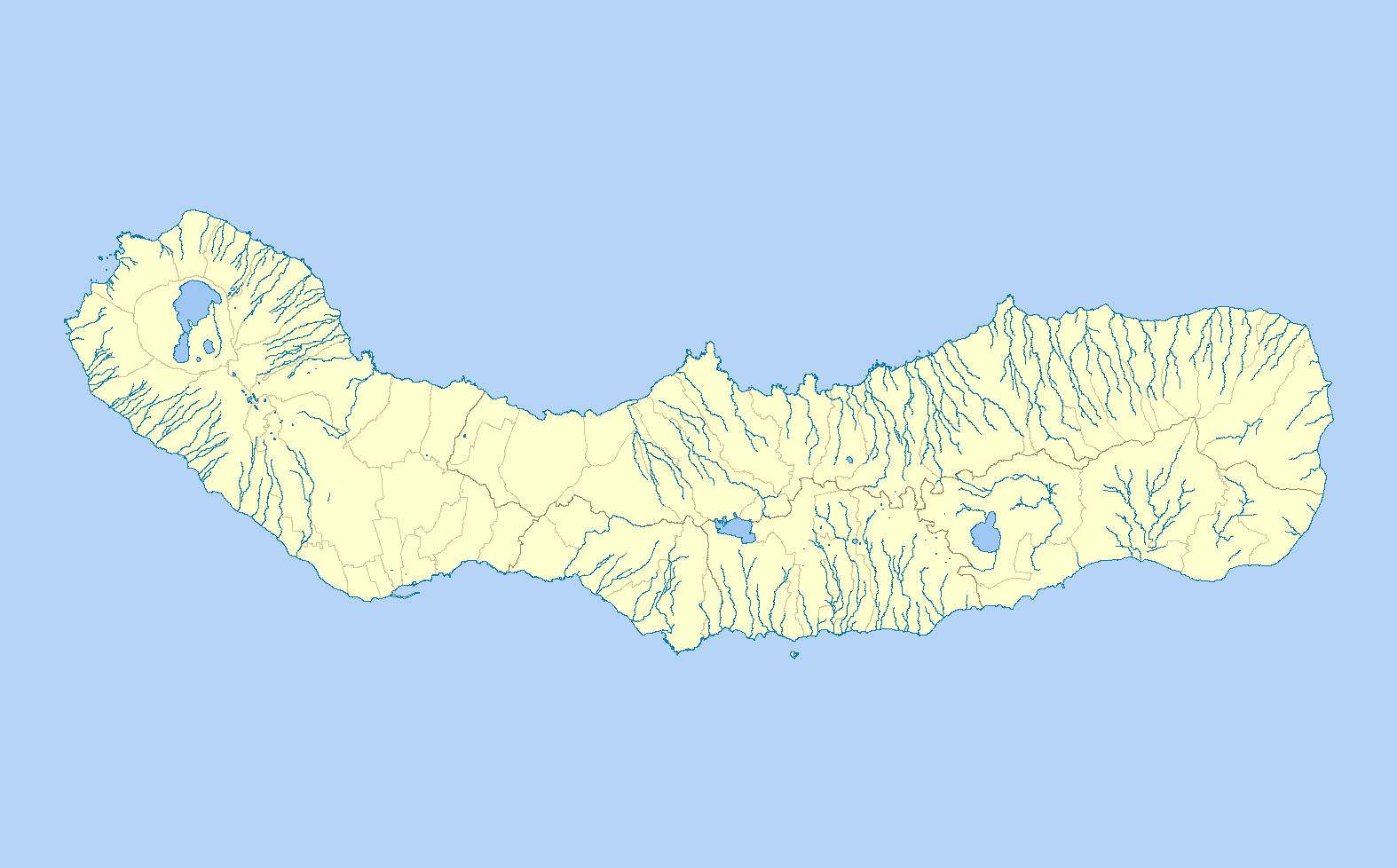
- Location in the Azores Santo António de Nordestinho (São Miguel)
- Coordinates: 37°51′8″N 25°12′45″W
- Country: Portugal
- Auton. region: Azores
- Island: São Miguel
- Municipality: Nordeste
- Established: Civil parish: 16 July 2002

Area
  - Total: 7.94 km^{2} (3.07 sq mi)
- Elevation: 225 m (738 ft)

Population (2011)
  - Total: 255
  - Density: 32.1/km^{2} (83.2/sq mi)
- Time zone: UTC−01:00 (AZOT)
  - Summer (DST): UTC+00:00 (AZOST)
- Postal code: 9630-241
- Area code: 292
- Patron: Santo António

Santo António de Nordestinho is a parish in the municipality of Nordeste, Azores in the Portuguese Azores. The population in 2011 was 255, in an area of 7.94 km^{2}. The parish was formed on July 16, 2002, when the parish of Nordestinho was split into the parishes Algarvia, Santo António de Nordestinho and São Pedro de Nordestinho.

== Sports ==
The following sports clubs are located in Santo António de Nordestinho:

- CD Santo António Nordestinho
