= Algarvia =

- Civil parish
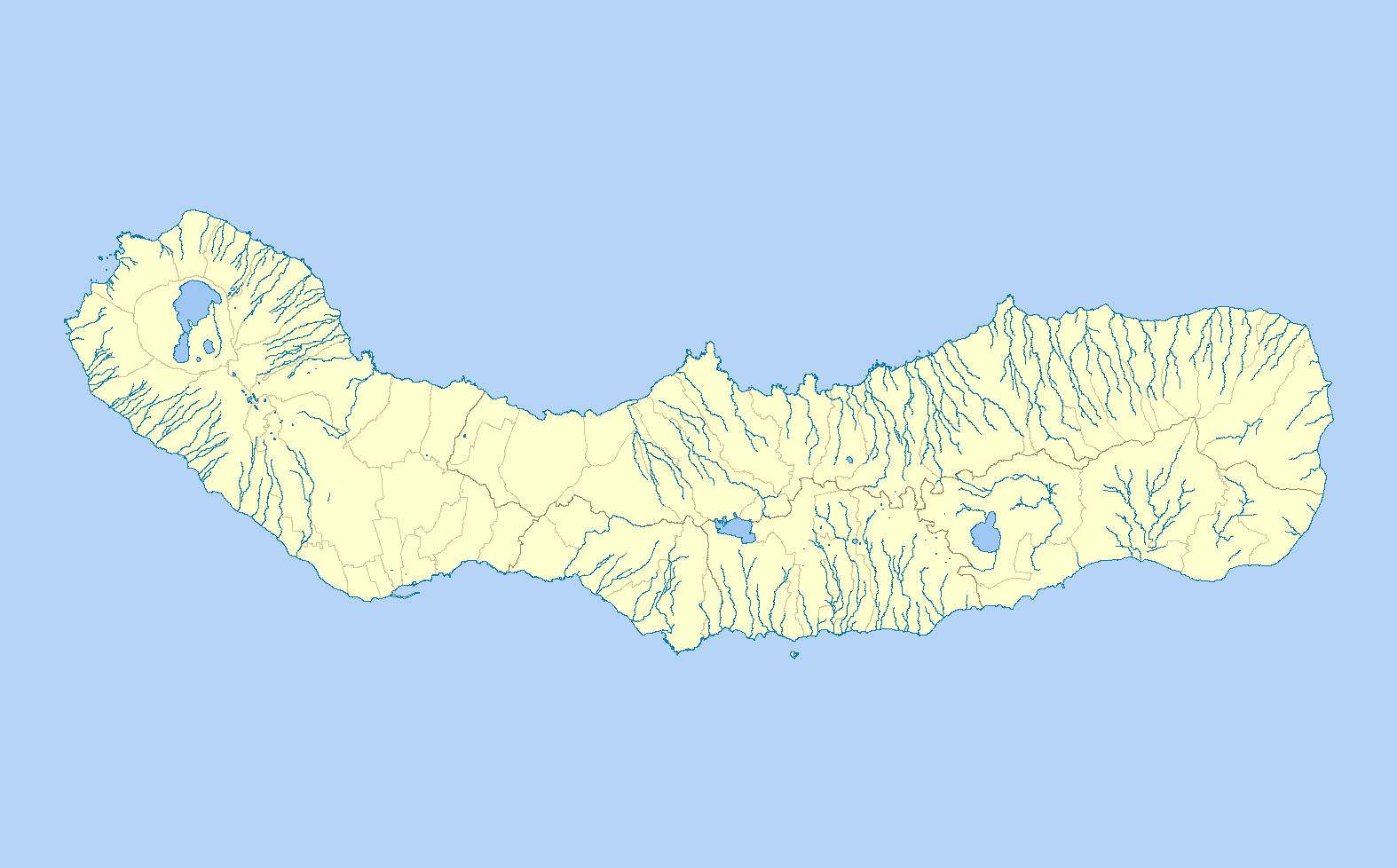
- Location in the Azores Algarvia (São Miguel)
- Coordinates: 37°50′45″N 25°13′54″W
- Country: Portugal
- Auton. region: Azores
- Island: São Miguel
- Municipality: Nordeste
- Established: Settlement: fl. 1500; Parish: fl. 1800; Civil parish: 16 July 2002

Area
  - Total: 5.40 km^{2} (2.08 sq mi)
- Elevation: 292 m (958 ft)

Population (2011)
  - Total: 290
  - Density: 54/km^{2} (140/sq mi)
- Time zone: UTC−01:00 (AZOT)
  - Summer (DST): UTC+00:00 (AZOST)
- Postal code: 9630-222
- Area code: 292
- Patron: Nossa Senhora do Amparo

Algarvia is a civil parish in the municipality of Nordeste, on the island of São Miguel in the Portuguese Azores. The population in 2011 was 290, in an area of 5.40 km^{2}. The parish was formed on July 16, 2002, when the parish of Nordestinho was split into the parishes Algarvia, Santo António de Nordestinho and São Pedro de Nordestinho. It consists of the localities Algarvia and Lomba Velha.
