= CD Santo António Nordestinho =

Portuguese football club

- Full name: Clube Desportivo Santo António Nordestinho
- Founded: 1973
- Ground: Campo de Jogos de Sto António; Santo António de Nordestinho, Azores; Portugal
- Chairman: Valdir Pacheco Raposo
- League: Currently inactive
Home colours

Clube Desportivo Santo António Nordestinho (known as CD Santo António Nordestinho or St. Ant. Nordestinho), is a Portuguese football club based in Santo António de Nordestinho on the island of São Miguel in the Azores.

== Background ==
CD Santo António Nordestinho is currently inactive but in 1998–99 competed in the Terceira Divisão, which is the fourth tier of Portuguese football. The club was founded in 1973 and they play their home matches at the Campo de Jogos de Sto António in Santo António de Nordestinho.

The club is affiliated to Associação de Futebol de Ponta Delgada and has competed in the AF Ponta Delgada Taça. The club has also entered the national cup competition known as Taça de Portugal on one occasion, losing 1–0 at home to Clube União Micaelense on 2 September 2001.

== Season to season ==
Season	Level	Division	Section	Place	Movements
1990–91	Tier 6	Distritais	AF Ponta Delgada - 2ª Divisão		
1991–92	Tier 6	Distritais	AF Ponta Delgada - 2ª Divisão		
1992–93	Tier 6	Distritais	AF Ponta Delgada - 2ª Divisão		Promoted
1993–94	Tier 5	Distritais	AF Ponta Delgada - 1ª Divisão		
1994–95	Tier 5	Distritais	AF Ponta Delgada - 1ª Divisão		
1995–96	Tier 5	Distritais	AF Ponta Delgada - 1ª Divisão		
1996–97	Tier 5	Distritais	AF Ponta Delgada - 1ª Divisão		
1997–98	Tier 5	Distritais	AF Ponta Delgada - 1ª Divisão		Promoted
1998–99	Tier 4	Terceira Divisão	Série Açores	10th	Relegated
1999–2000	Tier 5	Distritais	AF Ponta Delgada - 1ª Divisão		
2000–01	Tier 5	Distritais	AF Ponta Delgada - 1ª Divisão	4th	
2001–02	Tier 5	Distritais	AF Ponta Delgada - 1ª Divisão		
2002–03	Tier 5	Distritais	AF Ponta Delgada - 1ª Divisão	10th	
2003–04	Tier 5	Distritais	AF Ponta Delgada - 1ª Divisão		Withdrew
2004–05		Inactive			
2005–06		Inactive			
2006–07		Inactive			
2007–08	Tier 5	Distritais	AF Ponta Delgada - 1ª Divisão	7th	
2008–09	Tier 5	Distritais	AF Ponta Delgada - 1ª Divisão	8th	
2009–10	Tier 5	Distritais	AF Ponta Delgada - 1ª Divisão	8th	
2010–11		Inactive			
2011–12		Inactive			
