= Nordeste, Azores =

Nordeste
- Municipality
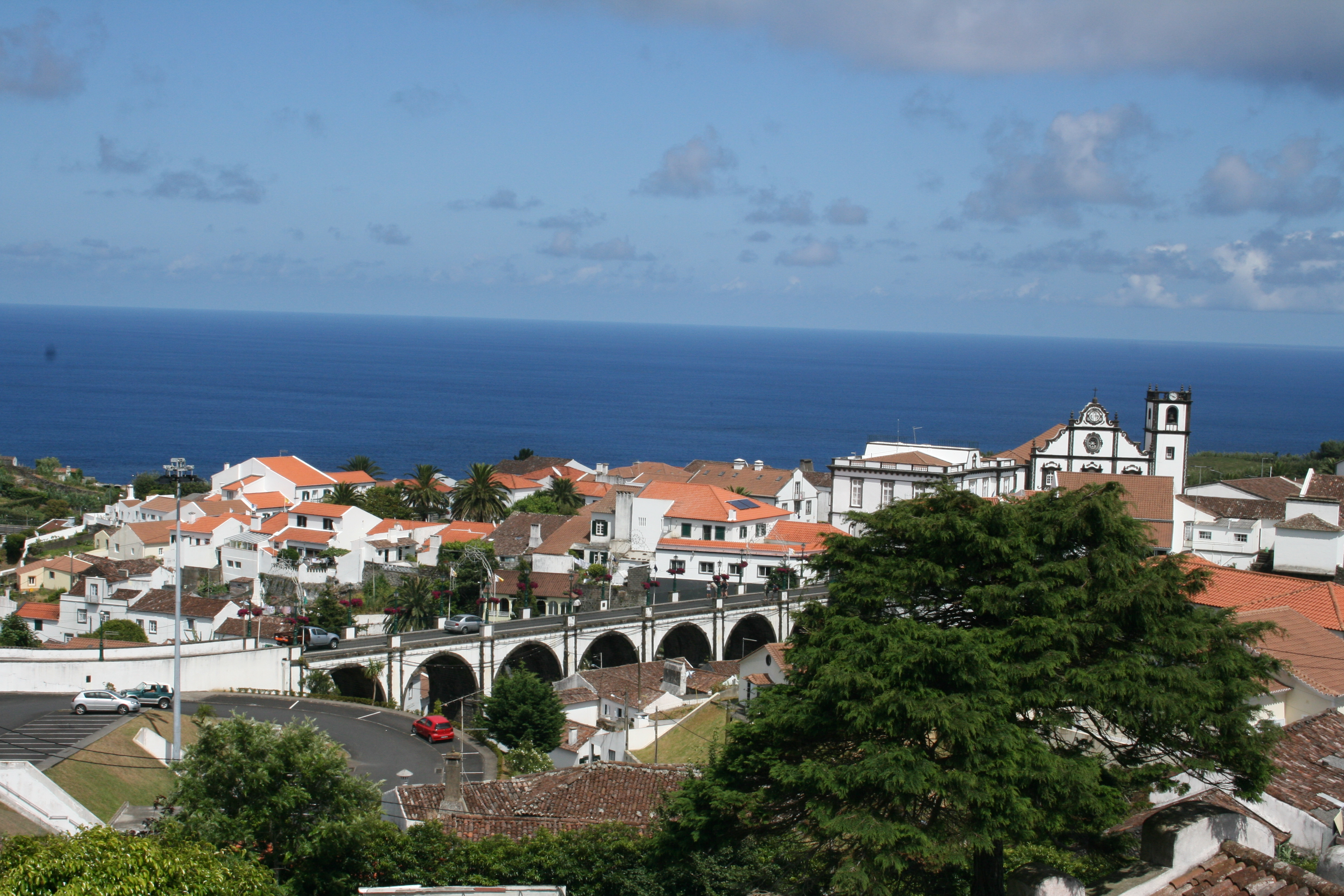

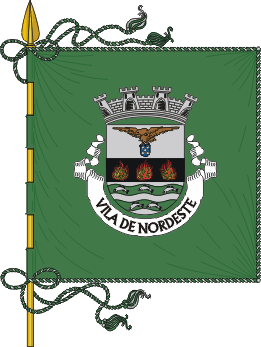
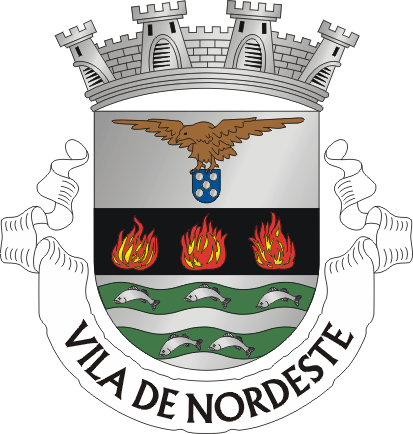
- Flag Coat of arms
- Interactive map of Nordeste
- Coordinates: 37°49′58″N 25°8′47″W
- Country: Portugal
- Auton. region: Azores
- Island: São Miguel
- Established: Settlement: c. 1514
- Parishes: 9

Government
  - President: António Miguel Borges Soares

Area
  - Total: 101.47 km^{2} (39.18 sq mi)
- Elevation: 138 m (453 ft)

Population (2011)
  - Total: 4,937
  - Density: 48.65/km^{2} (126.0/sq mi)
- Time zone: UTC−01:00 (AZOT)
  - Summer (DST): UTC+00:00 (AZOST)
- Area code: 292
- Patron: São Jorge
- Local holiday: Monday closest to July 18
- Website: http://www.cm-nordeste.pt

Nordeste (Portuguese pronunciation: [ˌnɔɾˈðɛʃtɨ]; Portuguese for northeast, hence that part of the island) is a municipality on the northeastern part of São Miguel Island in the Azores. The population in 2011 was 4,937, in an area of 101.47 square kilometres (39.18 mi^{2}).

== Geography ==
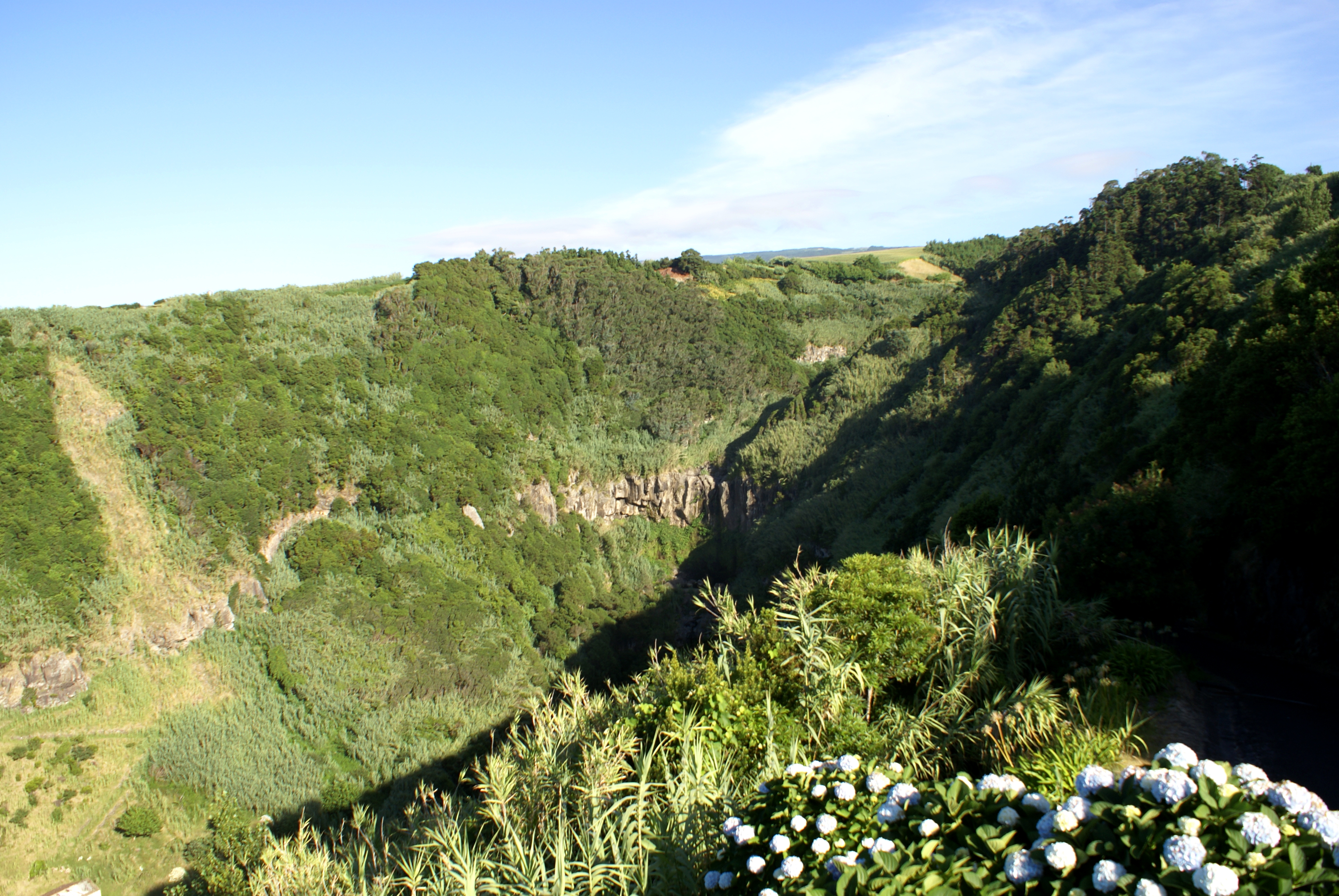
One of the rugged river-valleys that cross Nordeste; The Salto da Farinha Belvedere near Pedreira

The municipality of Nordeste covers the northeastern part of the island São Miguel. It is the least populated on the island of São Miguel, and most of its interior is covered forests, mountainous peaks and river-valleys, punctuated by fertile pastureland. It was formerly a fertile area used for growing wheat that was used to supply ships heading to the East Indies. King Manuel I of Portugal granted it the status of a town. The prosperity of the municipality ended after an earthquake in 1534 led to the fertile farmland being buried under pumice from the mountains.

The highest elevations in this region include Pico Redondo (980 metres), Pico Verde (927 metres), Pico Bartolomeu (887 metres) and Pico da Vara (1103 metres), the highest point on the island of São Miguel.

Administratively, there are nine civil parishes in the municipality:

- Achada
- Achadinha
- Algarvia
- Lomba da Fazenda
- Nordeste
- Salga
- Santana
- Santo António de Nordestinho
- São Pedro de Nordestinho

The parish Nordeste has a population of 1,341 (2011) and an area of 23.13 square kilometres (8.93 mi^{2}).

== Tourism ==
In 2022, it was recorded that 64% of visits to Nordeste were non-Portuguese. in 2025, Nordeste announced that they were introducing a tourist tax. It was justified in order to fund sanitation projects and maintain public spaces. The tax would be €2 per night up to three nights. In also hosts the rotating Azores Day celebrations.

== Sports ==
The following sports clubs are located in Nordeste:

- UD Nordeste
- CD Santo António Nordestinho
