= G.D. Águias de Camarate =

Portuguese sports club

- Full name: Grupo Desportivo Águias de Camarate
- Nicknames: Águias(Eagles); Camarate; Águias de Camarate(Eagles of Camarate)
- Founded: 1 August 1950 (76 years ago) as Águias de Camarate
- Ground: Campo dos Barros; Lisbon, Portugal
- Capacity: 1500
- President: Frederico Dias
- Manager: Marco Almeida
- Website: http://www.aguiasdecamarate.pt/
Home colours	Away colours

Grupo Desportivo Águias de Camarate is a Portuguese sports club, located in the parish of Camarate, municipality of Loures, district of Lisbon.

== Sports History ==
=== Achievements ===
==== Seniors ====
Season: 1959/60 - Finalist in the cup of Lisbon

Season: 1977/78 - District Champion 3rd Division

Season: 1978/79 - District Champion 2nd Division

Season: 1979/80 - Deputy First Division District Champion

Season: 1980/81 - Dispute of the 3rd National Division

(November 7, 1982) - Historical match for the cup of Portugal played against Sporting Clube de Braga

Season: 1995/96 - District Champion 1st division

Seasons: 1996/97; 1997/98; 1998/99; 1999/2000 - Dispute of the 3rd national division

Season: 2000/01 - Dispute 2nd division (B) national

Season: 2001/02 - Dispute of the 3rd national division

==== Juniors ====
Season: 1984/85 - Champion 2nd district division

Season: 2003/04 - Climb the division of honor

Season: 2006/07 - Champion 2nd district division

==== Juveniles ====
Season: 1987/88 - Champion 2nd District Division

Season: 1989/90 - Dispute of the national championship

Season: 2001/02 - Ascent there is division of honor

==== Initiates ====
Season: 1988/89 - Winner of the extraordinary tournament of the 2nd division

Season: 2007/08 - National Champion

Season: 2017/18 - Win the "Europa League/Champions League in Loures"

==== Formation ====
The beginning of the Grupo Desportivo Águias de Camarate takes place in schools in 1999/00. They had hardly given the first paços when they got a chance to participate in the IV Iberian Tournament of schools, classified as top equipment of the county of Loures.

In 2006, the project of the schools of Grupo Desportivo Águias de Camarate begins, dream of the ball, which currently has more than 190 children.

Since 2012 the training project has been named AC Foot and has teams of Initiates, Infants A1, A2 and B, Benjamins A and B, Traquinas and Petizes.

== History in the Taça de Portugal ==
1980/81 - 1st Participation (1W-1L)

Águias de Camarate had their first appearance in the Portuguese Cup on September 28, 1980, in a game against Seixal FC, Camarate's 3–1 victory. They were eliminated on October 26 against the Trade and Industry with a 2–1 defeat.

1982/83 - 2nd Participation (1W-1L)

In their second appearance on the so-called "Proof Queen" of Portuguese football were headed to Vila Franca de Xira to face Vilafranquense, GDAC won the match 1-0 and went on to the 1/64 Round of 32 where got to face SC Braga in their field. GDAC lost the match 2-1 (Manel's goal).

1986/87 - 3rd Participation (1L)

Third appearance, without great history, GDAC were eliminated in the first game on October 11, 1986, by Monte da Caparica AC 3–1.

1990/91 - 4th Participation (1W-2D-1L) GDAC started the Portuguese Cup against CDR Massamá in the 1/512 round of 32. GDAC tied the first game in Camarate to 1 goal, in the playoff game in Massamá ended with a 5–3 victory for Camarate. In the next tie GDAC went to the field of Quimigal to draw a new tie to a goal, in the playoff game in Camarate they lost 2-1 and were thus eliminated.

1997/98 - 5th Participation (1W-1L)

On September 7, 1997, in the first round, GDAC received the Algarve's Louletano and beat the Algarve 2–1. In the second round it was GDAC turn to go to Algarve to face the Immortal of Albufeira (II Division) but GDAC lost, 7–0.

1998/99 - 6th Participation (1L)

The following year for the first time GDAC club went to the cup of Portugal two years in a row. GDAC had to go to U. Tires and lost 3–2.

1999/00 - 7th Participation (1L)

Third consecutive season in the Cup, as GDAC were in the 2nd division did not play the first round of the Cup and GDAC moved directly to the 2nd. GDAC went to Coimbra to face the local Union, final result was a 2–1 loss.

2000/01 - 8th Participation (3W-1L)

In the first round GDAC went to Sintra to face the always complicated Sintrense team. GDAC won the game 3–2. In the second round received Pinhalnovense, 3-1 for GDAC and a stamp for the next round. On November 1 SC Lamego comes to Camarate to play in the third round of the cup, GDAC won 3-0 clear. The Camaras Eagles had never had a series of victories like this in the Portuguese Cup! The fourth round was also the last for GDAC. GDAC had a trip to Póvoa de Varzim to face the strong team of the Varzim that season went up to the 1st Division. On a muddy pitch in the middle of the winter, the game lost to the poveiros (1–0 at halftime). In the second half Varzim took the match and won the match 4-0 and ended the best ever performance of GD Águias de Camarate in the Portuguese Cup.

2001/02 - 9th Participation (1W-1L)

First Qualifying, GDAC received and won the Coruchense by 4–3. In the second round GDAC faced the Union of Madeira (at the time it rose to 1st for Div.Honra) in Madeira, and GDAC were eliminated from the cup after a 4–0 defeat.

2002/03 - 10th Participation (1W-1L)

First Round, Camarate 2-0 Santacruzense da Madeira. In the second round GDAC received the mythical Barreirense and lost 3-0 and after six consecutive seasons to be present in this event, this was the last game of the Grupo Desportivo Águias de Camarate in the Portuguese Cup to this day.

== Leagues ==
Season	League	Classification
1997/98	III Division - E Series	7º
1998/99	III National Division - E Series	2º
1999/00	II Division B - Zona Centro	17º
2005/06	AF Lisboa 1st Division of Honor	16º
2007/08	AF Lisboa 2nd Division - Series 3	7º
2008/09	AF Lisboa 2nd Division - Series 2	3º
2009/10	AF Lisboa 1st Division - Series 2	10º
2016/17	AF Lisboa 2nd Division	4º
2017/18	AF Lisboa 1st Division - Series 2	4º
2018/19	AF Lisboa Division of Honor - Series 2	Running

== Stadium ==
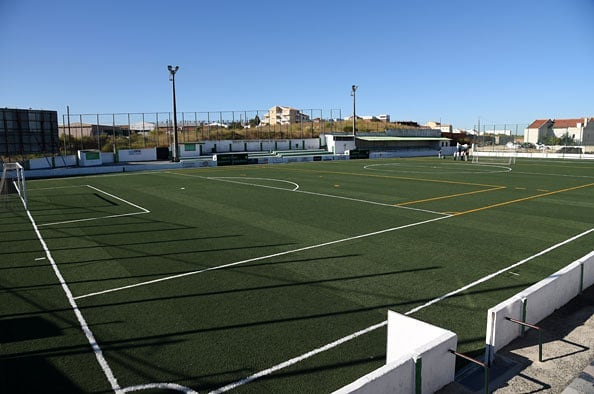
Football field of Quinta dos Barros in Bairro do Grilo (During the day).

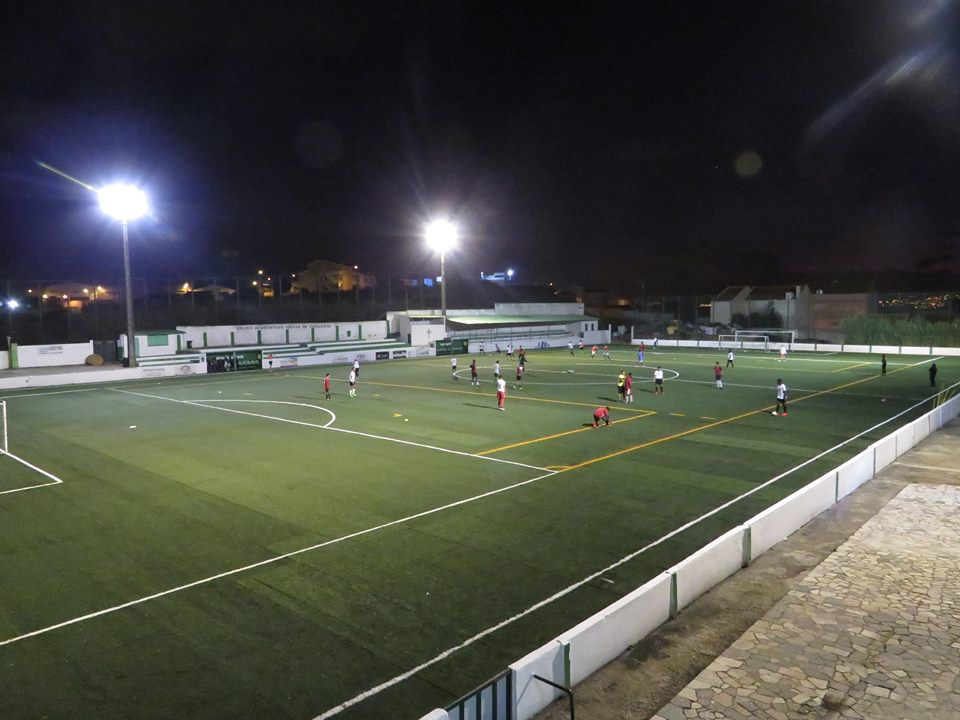
Football field of Quinta dos Barros in Bairro do Grilo (At night).

Football field of Quinta dos Barros in Bairro do Grilo, with a capacity of 1500 spectators.

Dimension of lawn, 91 meters long by 53 meters wide.

== Football ==
=== Sports material and sponsors ===
Período	Fabricante	Patrocinador
2016–2017	Aronick	Orlecorte
2017–2018	Aronick	Orlecorte
2018–Present	Acerbis	Orlecorte

=== Equipment ===
==== Current equipment ====
- 1º - Green and white sweater, shorts and green socks;
- 2º - Black sweater, shorts and black socks.

==== Goalkeeper's uniforms ====
- Yellow shirt, shorts and black socks;
- Pink shirt, shorts and black stockings.

=== Equipments ===
- 2017-18
- 1º - Green and white sweater, shorts and green socks;
- 2º - Black sweater, shorts and black socks.

== Kickboxing ==
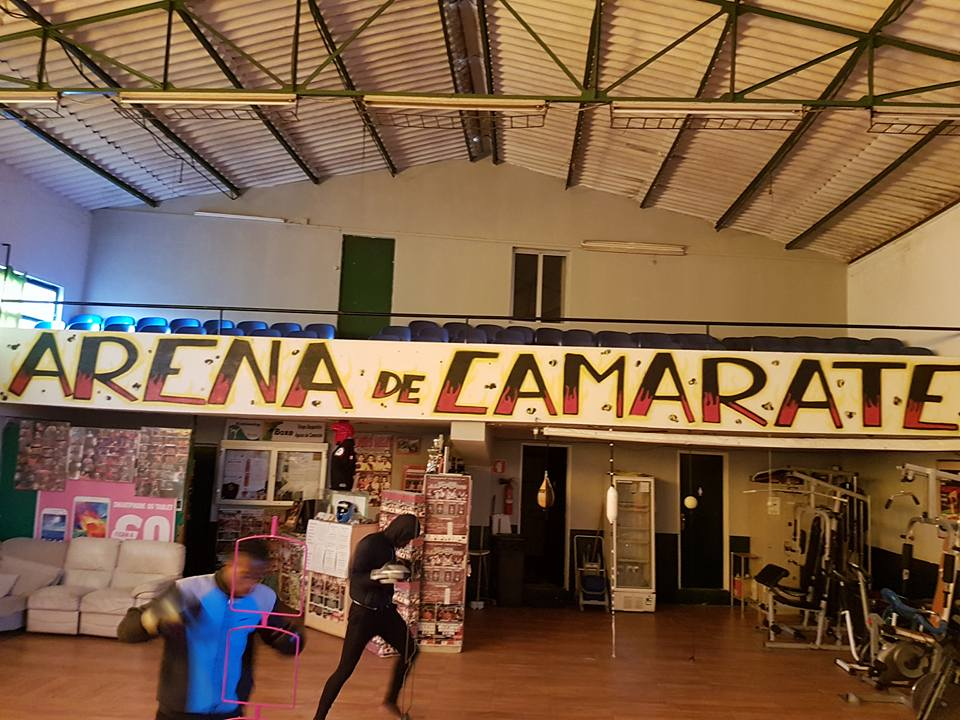
Arena of Camarate, in Camarate.

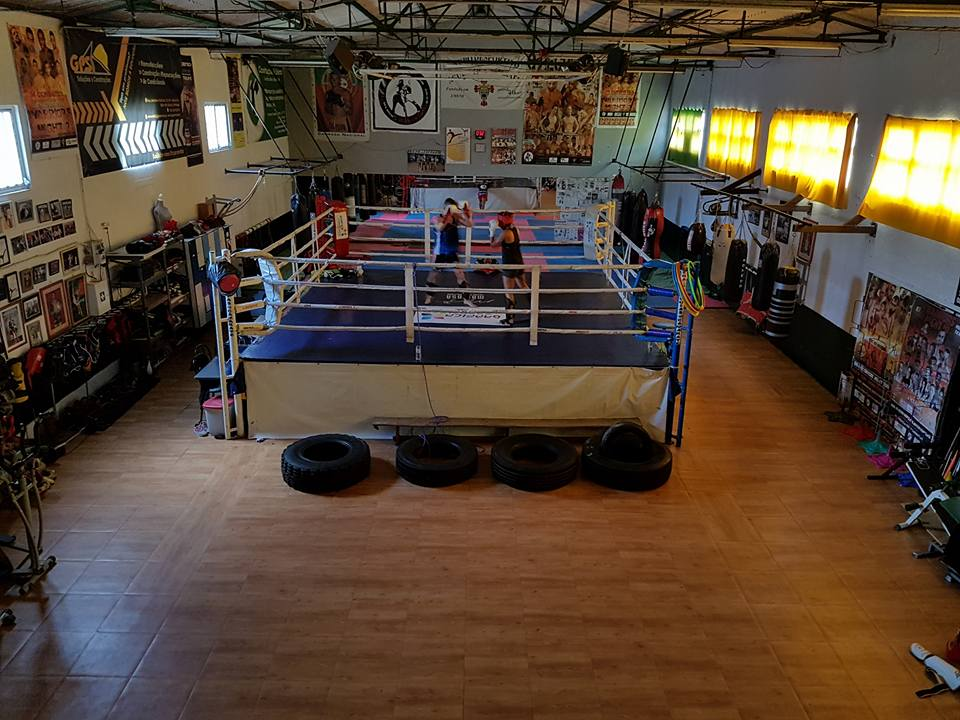
Arena training ring.

Arena of Camarate began in 2007 by the master Armandino Saints 4º Dan (rank) and its adjunct Guilherme Carvalho 1º Dan (rank), student of the master Armandino Santos. They then started the activity of Kickboxing and Muay Thai in the pavilion of the headquarters of the Eagles of Camarate, and the following year also with the Boxing.

I wondered if I should start classes in these conditions, since I had in mind a project in which I wanted to continue what I had been left behind after laying the pavilion of the South Musgueira, where I had taught previously successfully several years to form several individual and team champions. And since I'm not giving up I embraced this project of Kick boxing classes, muay thai and boxing, with nails and teeth in which I said to myself that I would make the Eagles of Camarate - Camarate Arena one of the best and most respected schools of the sport from the country.

And so, in these years I have been creating ever better conditions in the pavilion with the help of the Camarate Eagles, who have been throughout these 8 years, so that there are more and more athletes practicing combat sports.

At the beginning of these years we formed several athletes for life as well as for the sport itself. Several national, regional, Iberian and European champions. Athletes to represent the selection of Portugal with participation of Iberian European and world championships.

At the moment we have several references of professional athletes of top national and world level formed in the Eagles of Camarate:

Francisco Matos currently based in Switzerland was national boxing champion Kick boxing and K1

Ricardo Cabral European Muay Thai Champion and Iberian Muay Thai National Champion Kick Boxing and K1

Luís Dionísio WAC champion

Filipe Oliveira National Champion Full Contact

Athletes champion amateurs of Muay Thai Kick boxing and K1: Diogo Silva / Élson Joaquim / Nuno Silva / Cláudia Malik / Marisa Marques

Light Kick Cadets - juvenile initiates: Afonso Esteves / Daniel Romão / Leandro Paulo

Light Kick Seniors Manuel Paulo / Carlos Quedas / Nuno Fonseca / Filipa Quedas

We are current regional champions by K1 teams.

At the moment we are a reference like promoters and school of the Kick Boxing and Muai Thai national and with one of the best areas in terms of space and conditions for the practice of combat sports.

(Text by the author of Mestre Armandino Santos, September 2015. Original text in Portuguese.

=== Titles ===
World Champions, European, Iberian and National, some still in active others already retired and others who no longer represent the Arena Camarate. Big names in Portuguese Kickboxing and Muaythai from the school of Camarate Arena.

Élson Patrick, Filipe Oliveira, Luis Dionísio, Ricardo Cabral, Tiago Borges, Diogo Silva, Francisco Matos, Marco Romão e Alex Martins.

==== Recognition ====
Entrepreneurial Club - Grupo Desportivo Águias de Camarate was awarded the 2017 Entrepreneurial Club Award by the Portuguese Kickboxing and Muaythai Federation for the club's work in favor of Kickboxing and Muaythai. This award was presented by the president of the Federation Ana Melo to the coach of this distinguished group, Armandino Santos, during the Gala of the 30th anniversary of the Portuguese Kickboxing and Muaythai Federation, held last February 20, 2018, at the Champalimaud Foundation. CML was represented. The Municipality of Loures, reunited on February 28, 2018, reinforces this distinction for the work done for the Camarate community in the sports, social and associative level.
as "Águias de Camarate, Clube Empreendedor 2017"

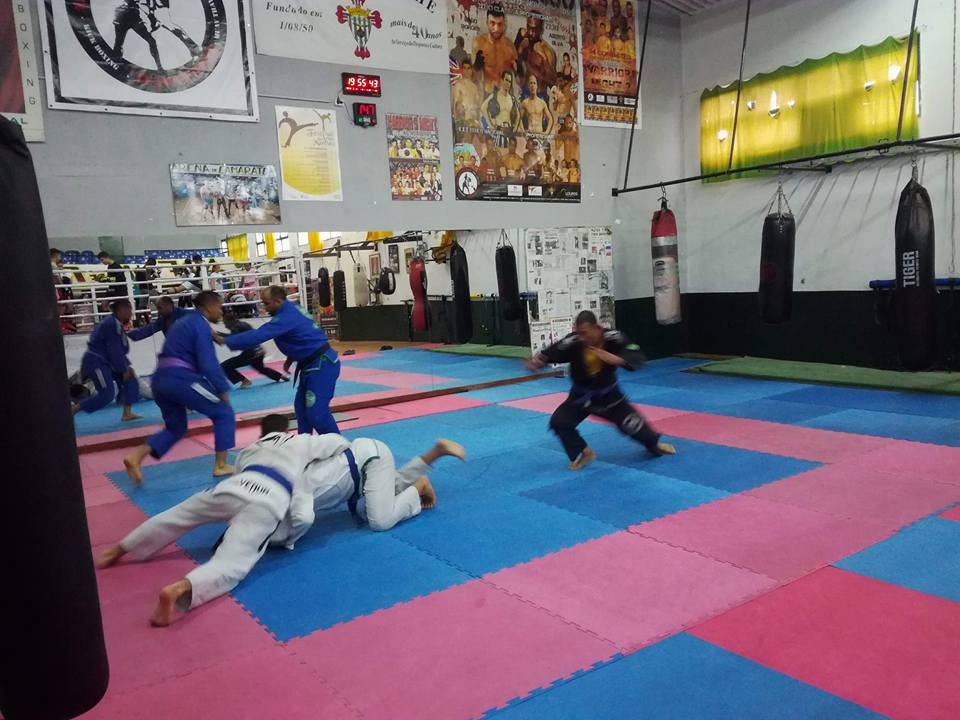
Training Zone.

== Brazilian Jiu Jitsu ==
Since the beginning of June 2018, the Arena de Camarate has become available to combat sports practitioners another modality. Brazilian jiu-jitsu under the supervision of Mestre Bruno Nascimento.

== Cycling ==
The sport in Camarate has one more modality. In 2018, Grupo Desportivo Águias de Camarate and the Trilhos do Oriente BTT Team signed a protocol that promotes local sport and adds another modality to one of the most reputed clubs in the Municipality of Loures.
