= Salga =

- Civil parish
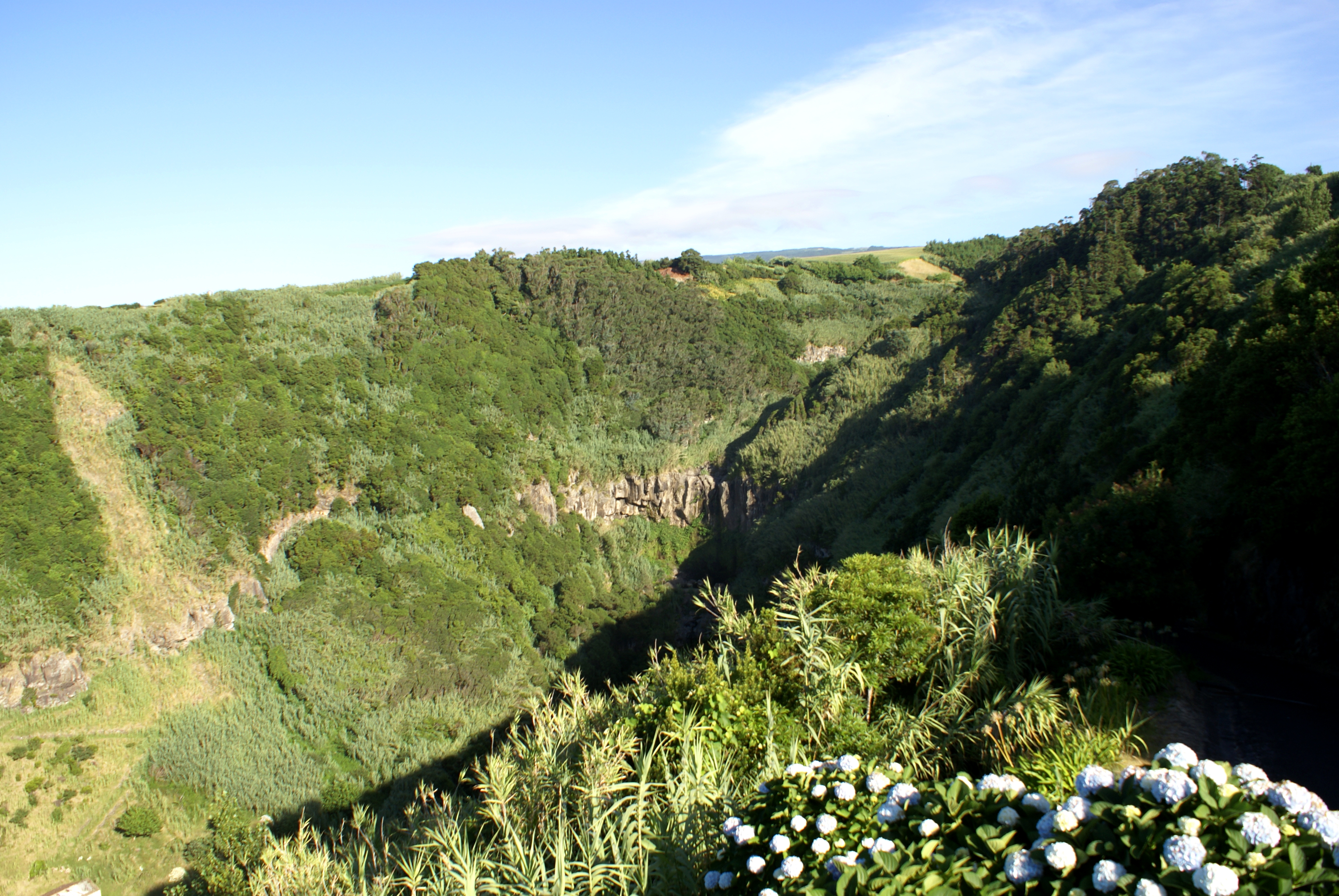
- The lookout at Salto da Farinha, in the parish of Salga, showing the interior river-valley

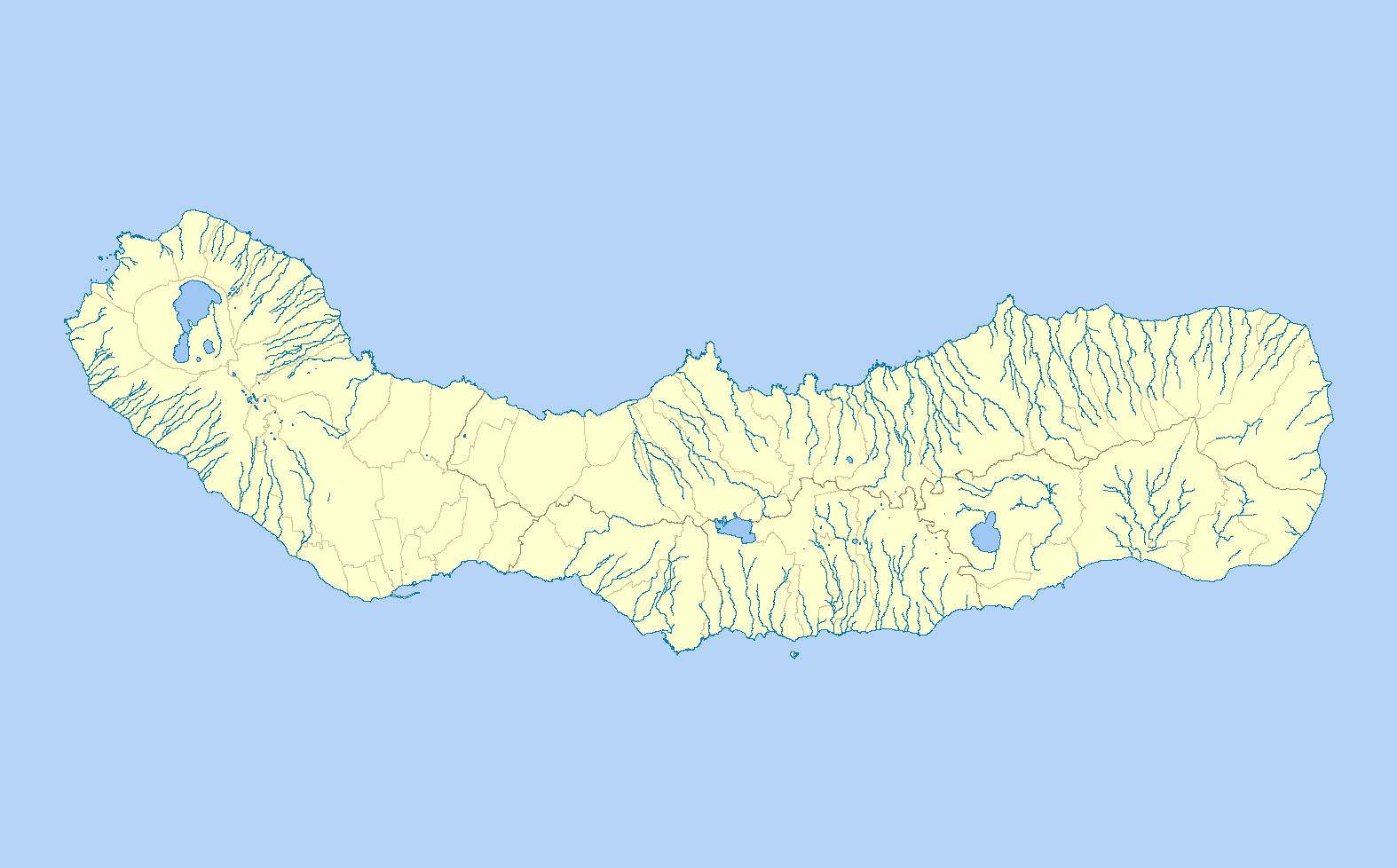
- Location in the Azores Salga (São Miguel)
- Coordinates: 37°50′53″N 25°18′0″W
- Country: Portugal
- Auton. region: Azores
- Island: São Miguel
- Municipality: Nordeste

Area
  - Total: 7.71 km^{2} (2.98 sq mi)
- Elevation: 220 m (720 ft)

Population (2011)
  - Total: 488
  - Density: 63.3/km^{2} (164/sq mi)
- Time zone: UTC−01:00 (AZOT)
  - Summer (DST): UTC+00:00 (AZOST)
- Postal code: 9630-282
- Area code: 292

Salga is a civil parish in the municipality of Nordeste in Portuguese archipelago of the Azores. In 2011, the population of Salga was 488.

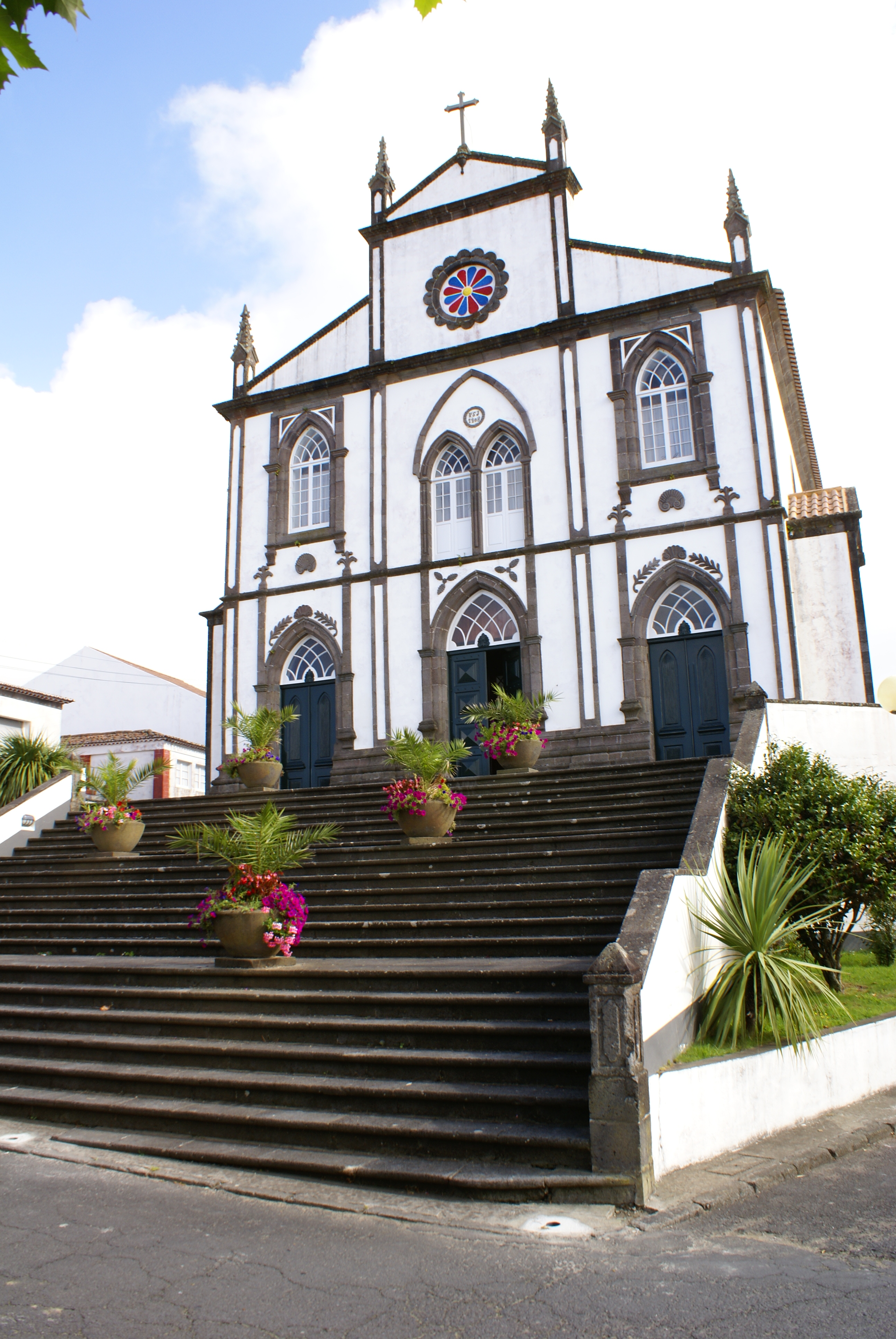
The Church of São José erected on the lands of Casa da Misericórdia

== History ==
Salga's settlement occurred late in the population of the island of São Miguel and the chronologist Gaspar Frutuoso referred to this territory as a land of natural pastures, used for hunting and wild "mountain pigs". It is from this that its name was given.

A little before 1746, a hermitage dedicated to Saint Joseph was first erected. At this time there were about 43 homes.

Then, on 3 October 1903, the cornerstone was set on a new church, constructed in front of the old hermitage, on the site of the Casa da Misericórdia. Its construction was ended in 1908.

The parish is one of the youngest of the municipality of Nordeste; a part of Achadinha since 1855, it became an administratively independent civil parish in 1980, but at the same time integrated into municipality of Nordeste.

== Geography ==
Salga is located 1 kilometre (0.62 mi) east of the community of Achadinha and west of the seat of Nordeste. The construction and opening of the road of Salto de Cavalo allowed the convergence of traffic from north and south, in addition from north to northeast. Salga has an area of 7.71 km^{2}.

== Economy ==
Salga has a rural agricultural economy, largely due to its history as a farmland.
