= Santana (Nordeste) =

- Civil parish
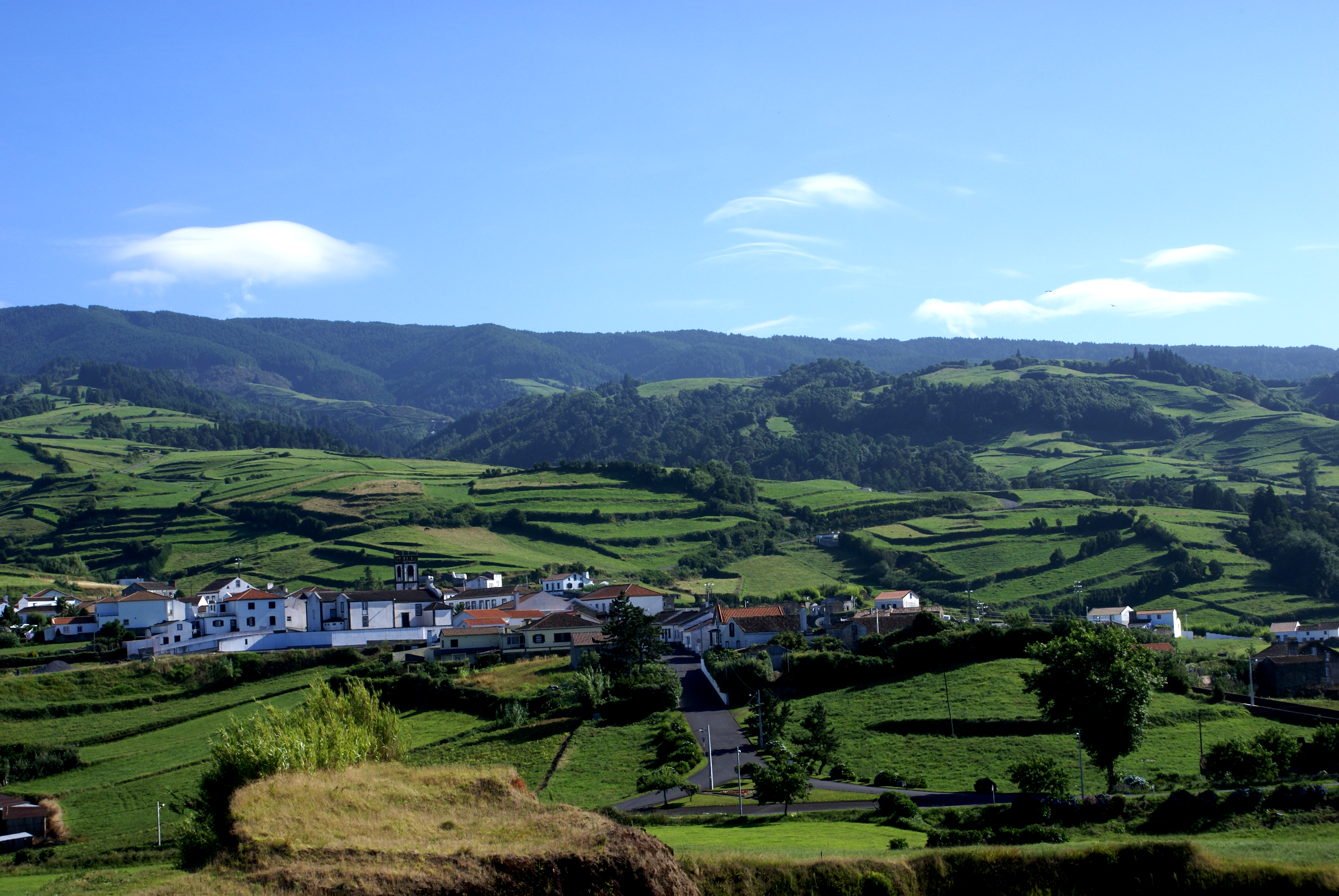
- A partial vista of a locality in Santana, showing the foothills of the Planalto dos Gramihais

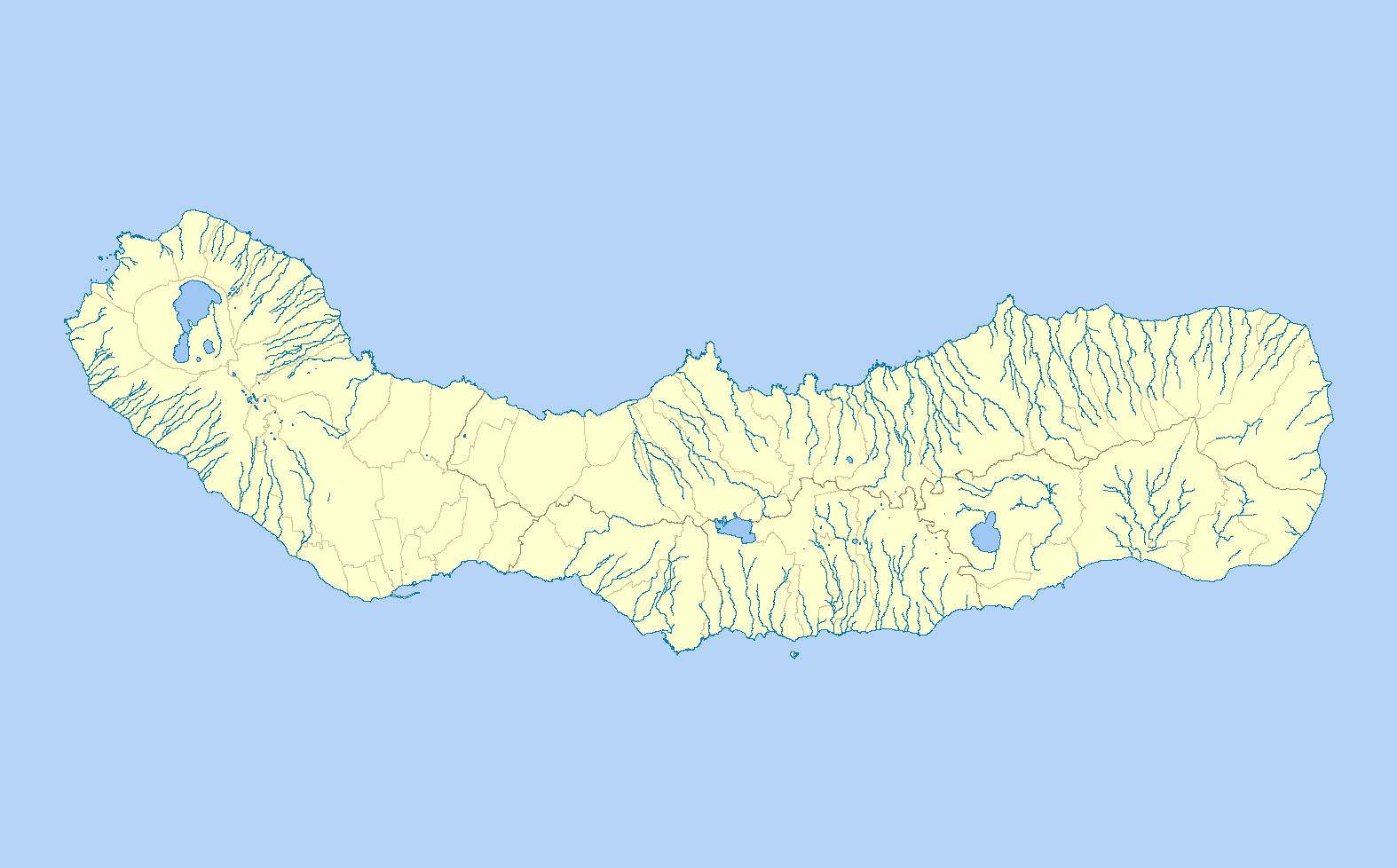
- Location in the Azores Santana (São Miguel)
- Coordinates: 37°50′59″N 25°15′17″W
- Country: Portugal
- Auton. region: Azores
- Island: São Miguel
- Municipality: Nordeste

Area
  - Total: 6.12 km^{2} (2.36 sq mi)
- Elevation: 213 m (699 ft)

Population (2001)
  - Total: 475
  - Density: 77.6/km^{2} (201/sq mi)
- Time zone: UTC−01:00 (AZOT)
  - Summer (DST): UTC+00:00 (AZOST)
- Postal code: 9630-307
- Area code: 292

Santana is a parish in the municipality of Nordeste in the Azores. It is split by a stream into two localities known as Feteira Grande and Feteira Pequena. The population in 2011 was 475, in an area of 6.12 km². It contains the localities Feteira Grande and Feteira Pequena.
