= Achada =

- Civil parish
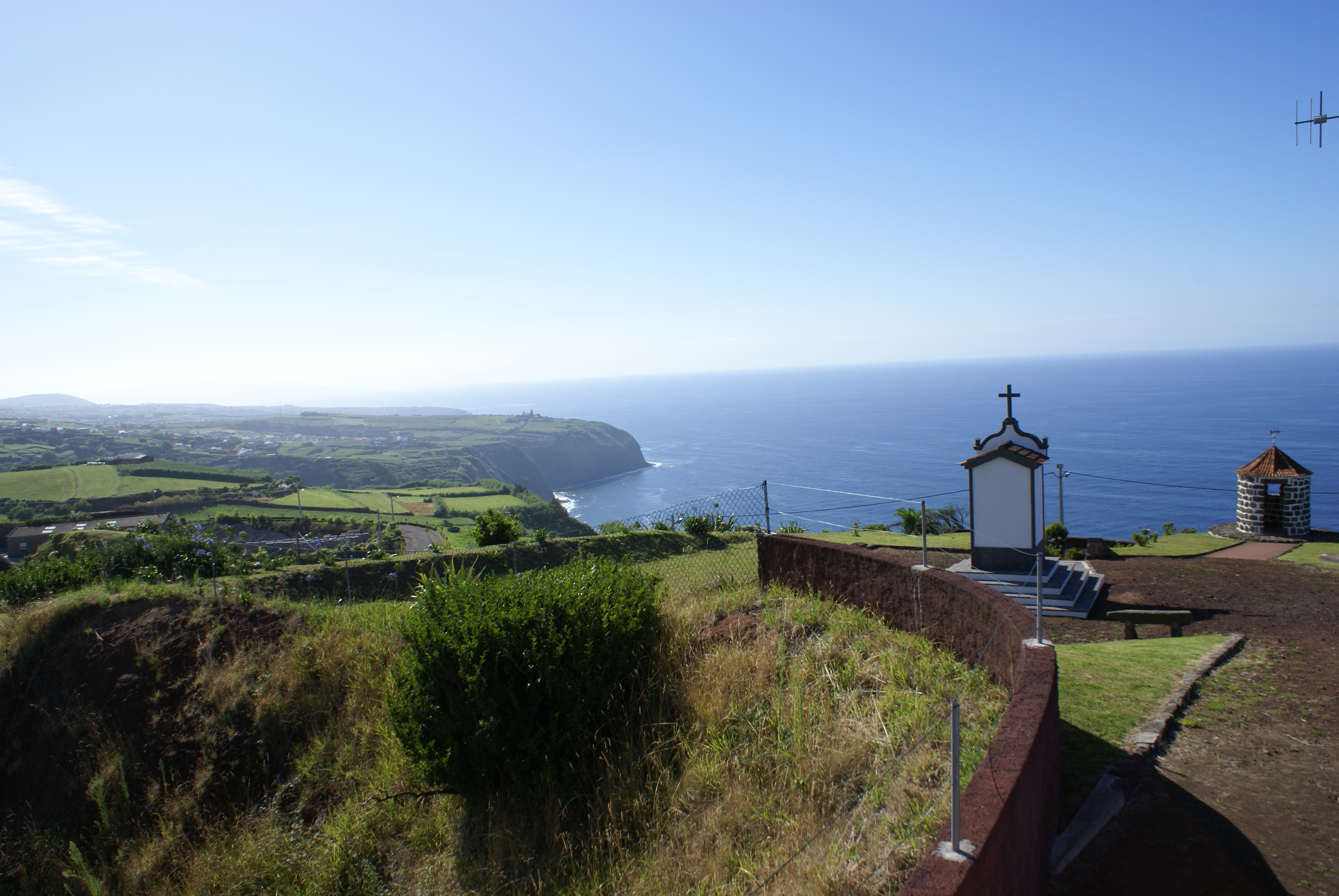
- Miradouro da Baleia (English: Belvadere of the Whale), Santana, showing the parish of Achada in the distance

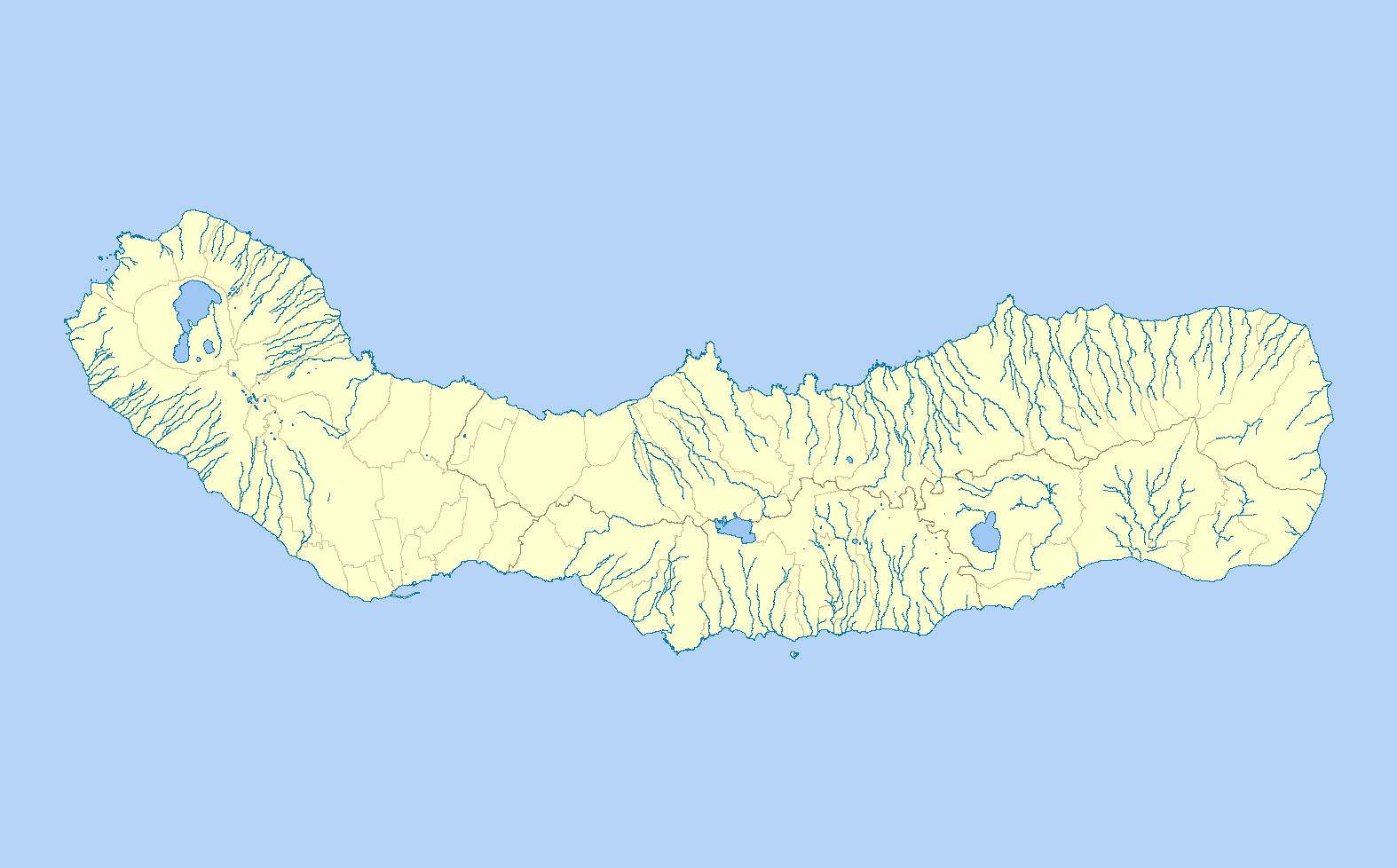
- Location in the Azores Achada (São Miguel)
- Coordinates: 37°51′3″N 25°15′59″W
- Country: Portugal
- Auton. region: Azores
- Island: São Miguel
- Municipality: Nordeste

Area
  - Total: 11.89 km^{2} (4.59 sq mi)
- Elevation: 194 m (636 ft)

Population (2011)
  - Total: 436
  - Density: 36.7/km^{2} (95.0/sq mi)
- Time zone: UTC−01:00 (AZOT)
  - Summer (DST): UTC+00:00 (AZOST)
- Postal code: 9630-024
- Area code: 292
- Patron: Nossa Senhora da Anunciação
- Website: http://www.jfachada.ifreg.pt/

Achada is a freguesia ("civil parish") in the municipality Nordeste on the island of São Miguel in the Azores. The population in 2011 was 436, in an area of 11.89 km^{2}.

== History ==
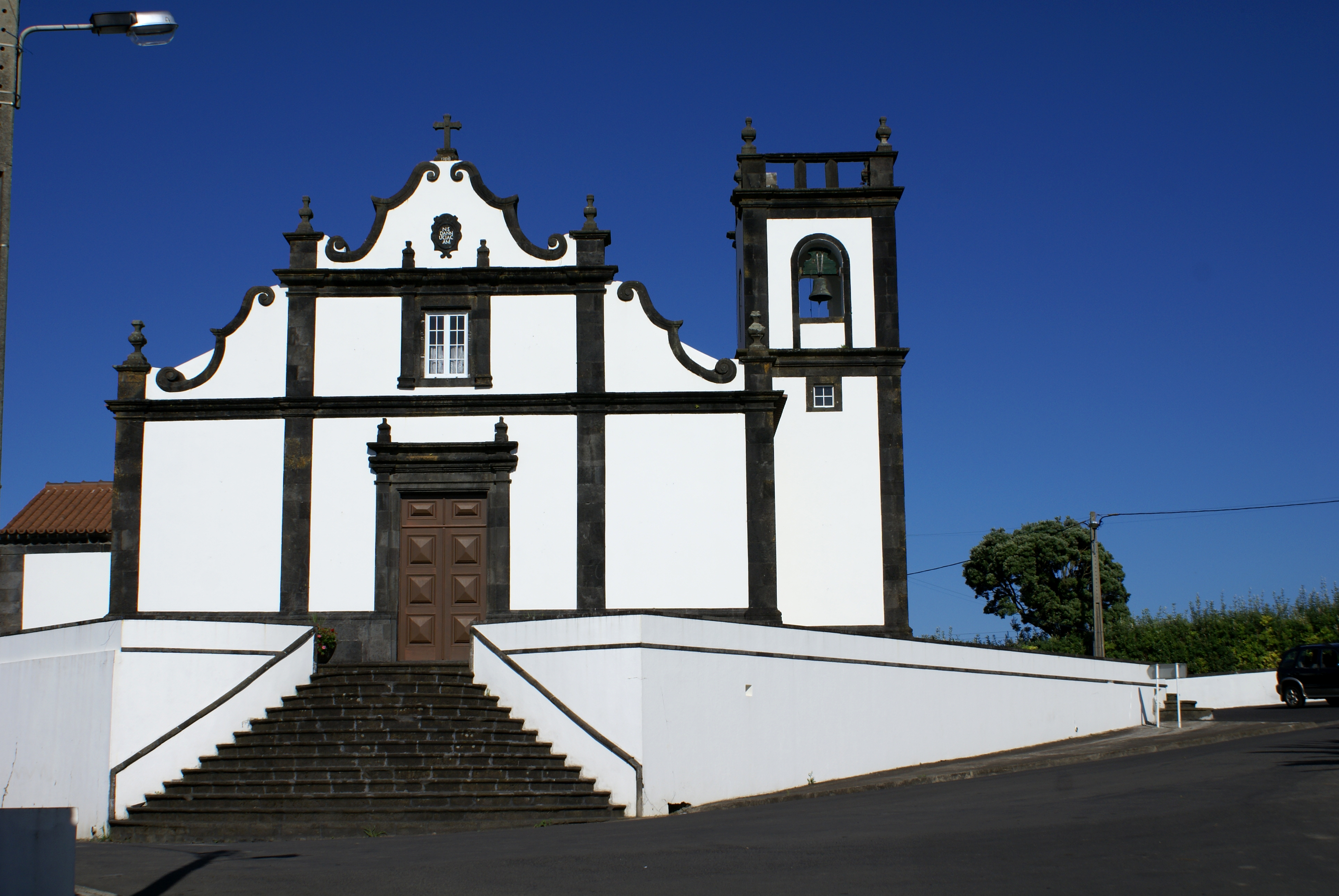
The front facade of the parochial church of Nossa Senhora da Anunciação, Achada, São Miguel

The area known as Achada, once referred to as Achada Grande, was originally populated in the first have of the 16th century. Its name was derived from the Portuguese phrase terra achanada which means flatland and was first mentioned by the historian Father Gaspar Frutuoso in Saudades da Terra. These lands were originally occupied and administered by Antão Rodrigues da Câmara, a descendant of the third Capitain-Donatário of São Miguel, but were sold, then tilled and sold to other settlers.

By 1526 the village had its own parochial church to the invocation of Nossa Senhora da Anunciação (English: Our Lady of the Annunciation) where members of the religious orders resided locally. The temple was the result of various remodeling projects starting at the end of 1782 until 1984.

Since the 16th century, Achada has been a religious (later civil) parish, but it was only annexed into the municipality of Nordeste in 1820 (having previously pertained to the municipality of Ribeira Grande).

== Economy ==
Its fertile lands, which extend the length of the Achada plain, have been the source of the region's economy. Agriculture and dairy production is typical in this area, including cereal crops and tubers. A small port was commercially important until the 20th century when most exports were handled from Ponta Delgada. Today, potatoes and corn are principal crops cultivated in the area, where the harvested materials are used for feed in the raising of cattle.

== Culture ==
=== Festivities ===
Traditional festivals occur in the month of August, and include a diverse program of events such as the traditional barracas with native foods and drink. The primary events occur around the Império da Achada, when the annual feasts of the Divine Holy Spirit are celebrated that include meat-broth soups accompanied with local wines, traditional sweet bread (Portuguese: massa sovada) and sweet rice desserts.
