= Lomba da Fazenda =

- Civil parish
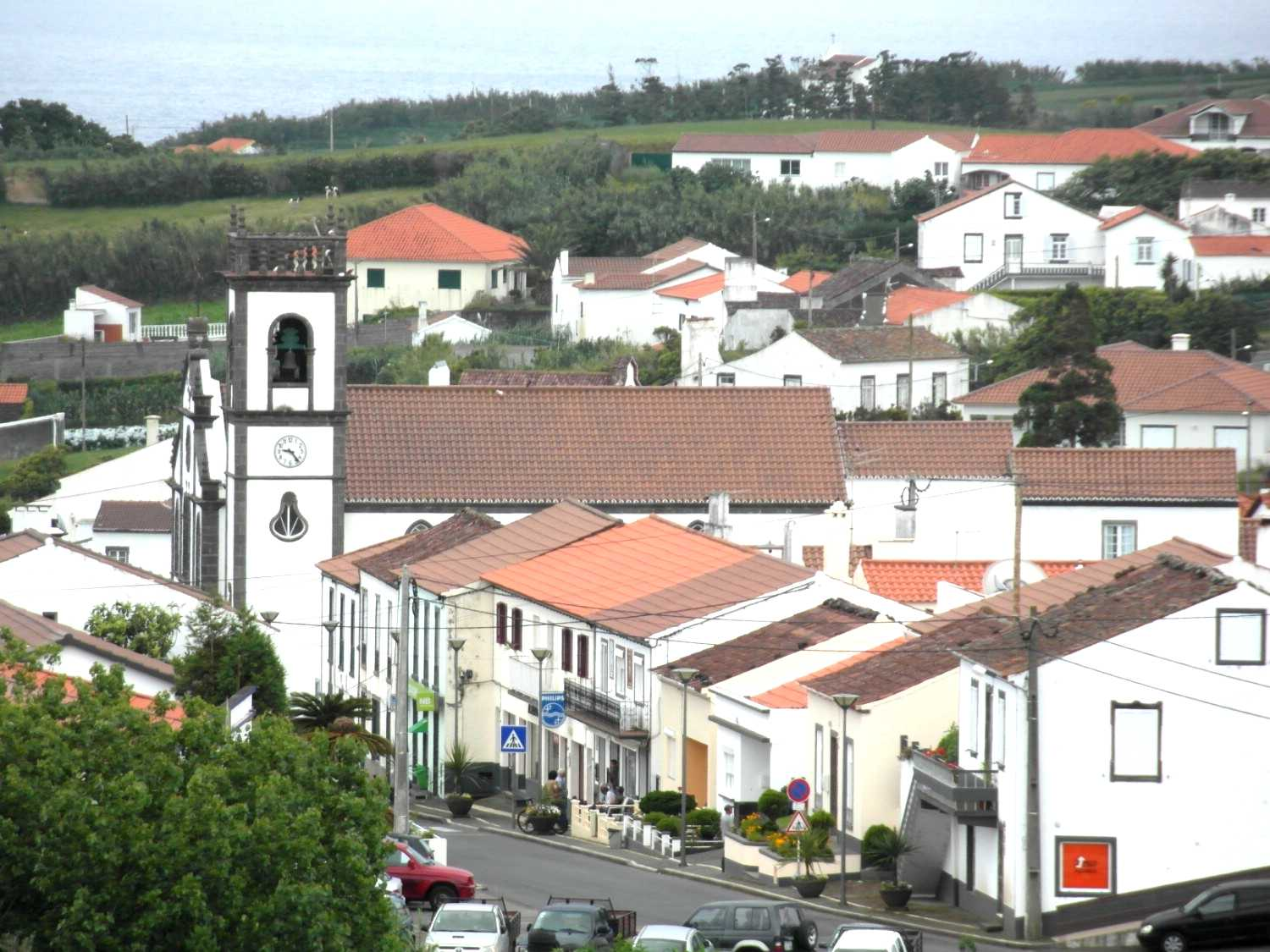
- Vista of the center of Lomba da Fazenda, showing the central community and church.

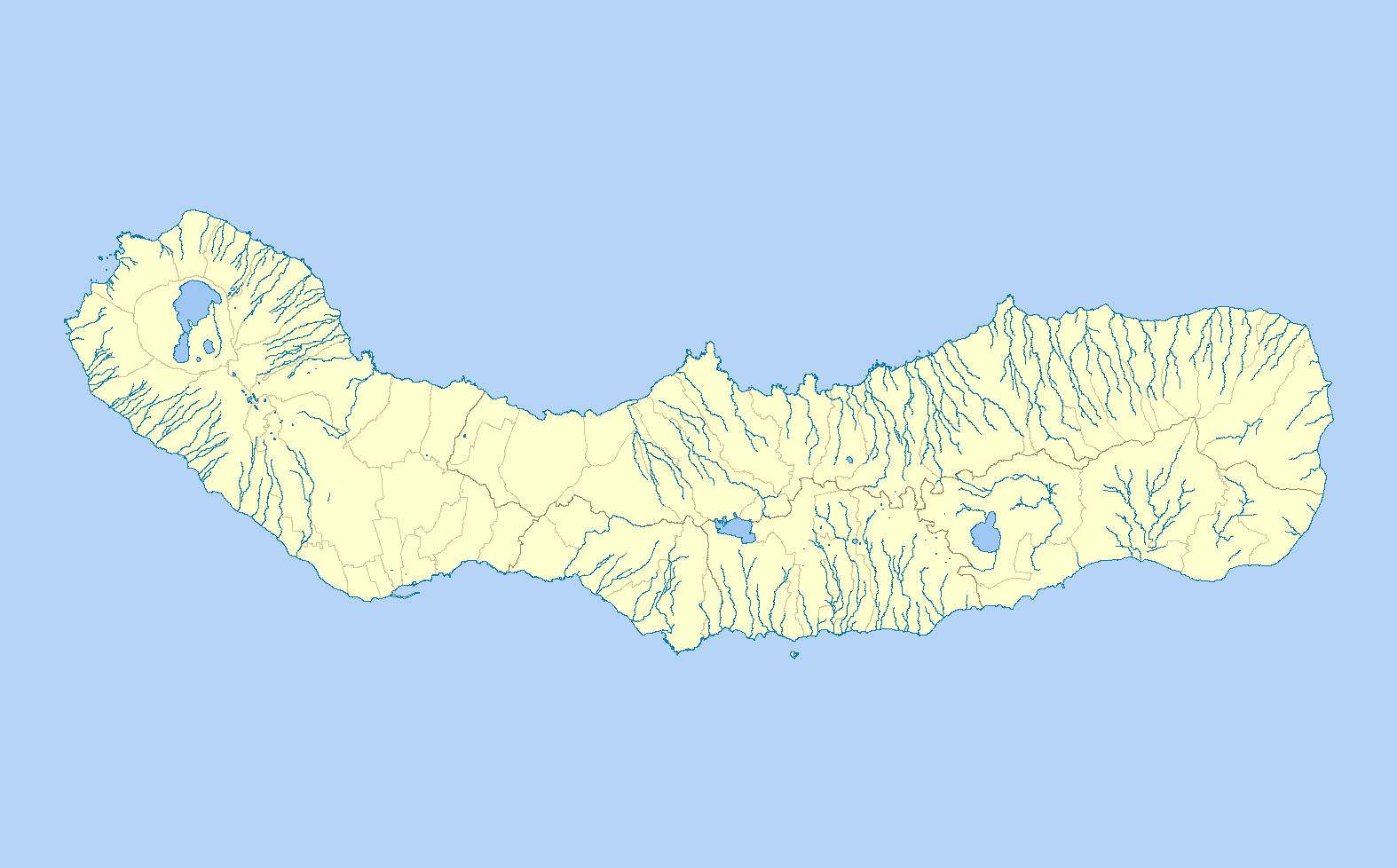
- Location in the Azores Lomba da Fazenda (São Miguel)
- Coordinates: 37°50′59″N 25°10′11″W
- Country: Portugal
- Auton. region: Azores
- Island: São Miguel
- Municipality: Nordeste

Area
  - Total: 14.77 km^{2} (5.70 sq mi)
- Elevation: 187 m (614 ft)

Population (2011)
  - Total: 844
  - Density: 57.1/km^{2} (148/sq mi)
- Time zone: UTC−01:00 (AZOT)
  - Summer (DST): UTC+00:00 (AZOST)
- Postal code: 9630-111
- Area code: 292
- Patron: Imaculada Conceição

Lomba da Fazenda is a parish in the municipality of Nordeste in the Azores. The population in 2011 was 844, in an area of 14.77 km^{2}. It contains the localities Lomba da Cruz, Conceição, Arraiado, Barreiros e Canada Francisco Duarte, Leira, R. Dr. Man. João da Silveira e Canada do Cristiano, Vale, Outeiro, Almas and Termo.

== Bibliography ==
- Atlântico Nordeste. Migrações
