= Vintage Yachting Games =

International sailing competition

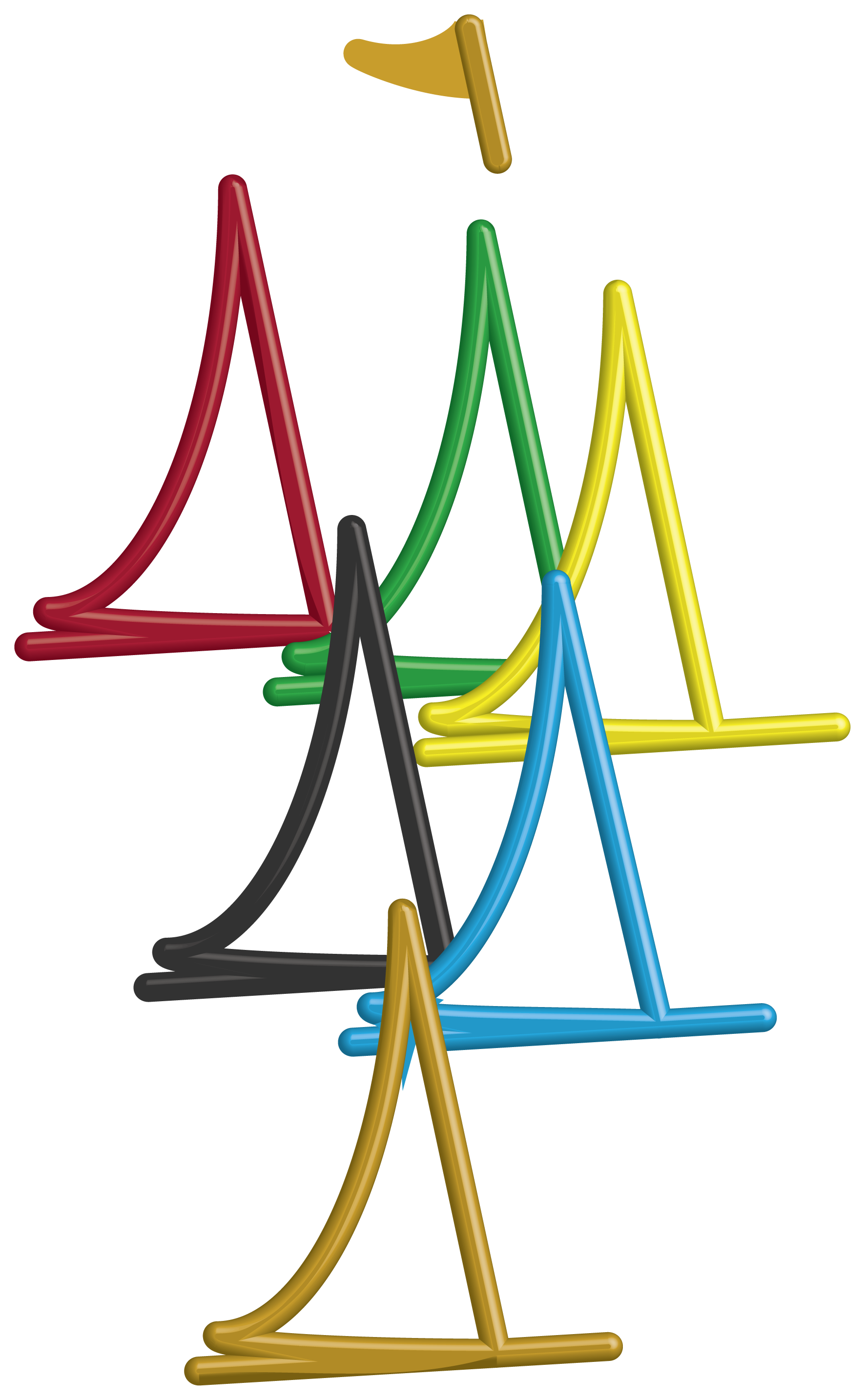
- Vintage Yachting Games Logo
- First held: 2008
- Organizer: Vintage Yachting Games Organization
- Type: Quadrennial multi-class regatta
- Classes: Europe (m & w), 12' Dinghy, 2.4 Metre, O-Jolle, 12m² Sharpie, Flying Dutchman, Yngling, Tempest, Star, Soling, Dragon, 5.5 Metre & 6 Metre.
- Website: http://vintageyachtinggames.org

The Vintage Yachting Games are an international Quadrennial multi class sailing event for former Olympic classes and the former Classes of the Paralympic Games. The Vintage Games is held every four years.

The idea behind the Vintage is to Organize a four yearly high-end event in the calendars of all the former (Paralympic) Olympic Classes after their discontinuation at the Olympics or Paralympic Games. First the idea was discusses and developed locally by Rudy den Outer and representatives of several Dutch class organizations of former Olympic classes (Martijn van der Driest of Europe, Harold Wijgers of Flying Dutchman, Johan Offermans of Soling, Michiel van Dis of Dragon and Hans Nadorp of 5.5 Metre). In the next phase the presidents/chairman of the international classes became involved (Jan Abrahamsen of Europe class, Theo Meus of O-Jolle, Alberto Barenghi of Flying Dutchman, Rose Hoeksema of Soling and Rupert Fisher of Dragon).

The first edition was held in Medemblik 20–27 September 2008. During the closing ceremony the next host country, Italy, received the Vintage flag from the mayor of Medemblik, Th. van Eijk.

The Vintage Yachting Games Organization (VYGO), a foundation under Dutch Law, was founded on 11 December 2006 by Rudy den Outer, Nancy Schoof and Sebastian Hopf. The VYGO has since become the governing body of the Vintage Yachting Games, whose structure and actions are defined by her constitution and charter. The VYGO's ownership lies with the Vintage Yachting Classes.

== Vintage Yachting Games principles ==
The Vintage Yachting Games are governed by the following set of principles:

- Charter Vintage Yachting Games
- Constitution Vintage Yachting Games
- VYGrules
- Standard VYG Notice of Race
- Standard VYG Sailing Instructions

=== Charter Vintage Yachting Games ===
The constitution of the Vintage Yachting Games Organization is based upon the Vintage Yachting Games Charter. Decisions made by the board or supervisory board and even race management must be in line with this charter:

1. Sailing is a sport to be performed with light sailing vessels (yachts). Sailing is done by sailors. Sailors participate in the sport in order to win races or series. This winning must be reached only by fair sailing, superior speed, strategically and tactical maneuvering, use of knowledge, excellent performance of skill and showing correct behavior
2. The Vintage Yachting Games is the result of the organized action, carried out under the authority of the Stichting Vintage Yachting Games Organization (VYGO), of all participating individuals and entities who like the game of Sailing. Its symbol is the yachts logo
3. All Individual Competitors, Judges, Coaches, Measurers, Members of the Regatta Committee, Sponsors, Organizers, Supervisory board members as well as board members regard the Competing Sailor in the Vintage Yachting Games as the most important stakeholder of the Vintage Yachting Games. They must act in order to guard the interest of those Sailors. The way active and competitive sailors want to play the game of Sailing is paramount for the Vintage Yachting Games
4. The interest of Vintage Yachting Games sailors in a specific class will be guarded by the relevant International Class Organizations (ICO) participating in the Vintage Yachting Games Organization's Supervisory Board
5. During the Vintage Yachting Games the sailors represent their National Class Organization (NCO) In the absence of a NCO the relevant ICO will act in her place
6. Any form of discrimination with regard to a country or a person on grounds of race, religion, politics, gender or otherwise is incompatible with the object Vintage Yachting Games and its organization

=== Constitution of Vintage Yachting Games ===
The constitution governs the way of management of the VYGO. This is the deed under Dutch law of the VYGO foundation.

=== VYG rules ===
Describes under what conditions the Vintage Yachting Games edition will be sailed, organized and managed.

=== Standard VYG Notice of Race (NOR) ===
This document is the basis of the final NOR that is determined in cooperation by the Host club and the VYGO. The final NOR must be published at least one year before the start of the first race of a Vintage Yachting Games edition.

=== Standard VYG Sailing Instructions (SI) ===
This document is the basis of the final SI that is determined in cooperation by the Host club and the VYGO. The final SI must be published at least one month before the first race of a Vintage Yachting Games edition.

== Vintage Yachting Games Event Structure ==
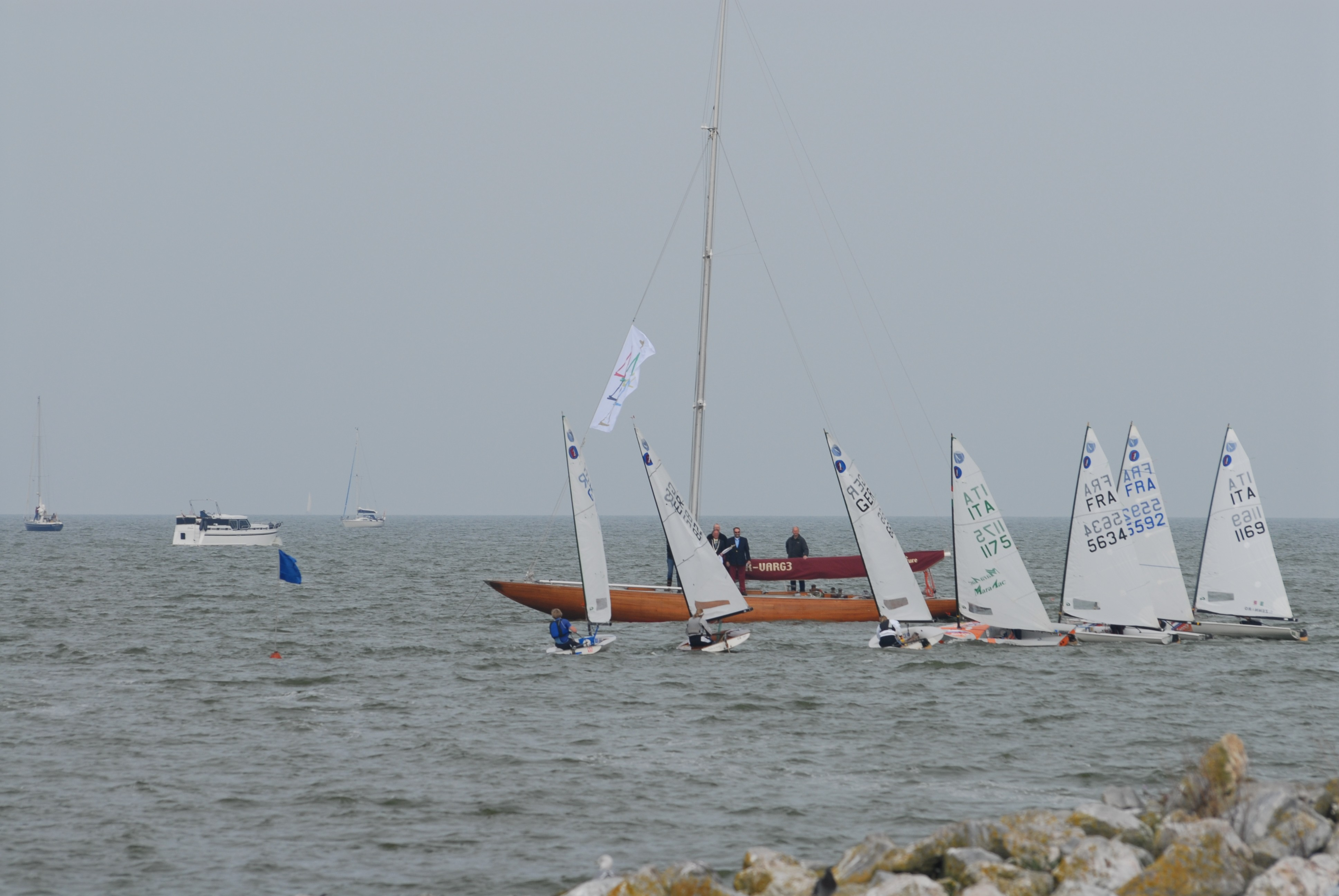
Fleet review as part of the 2008 Vintage Yachting Games Opening Ceremony

The structure of an edition of the Vintage Yachting Games is similar to that of an Olympic sailing event. It consists of:

- Opening ceremony if possible with fleet review
- A series of races per Vintage Yachting Class (at least 7 scheduled)
- A closing ceremony that includes the Vintage InterPares (VIP) race and medal presentation. Also the country trophy will be handed to the winning country.
- Passing of the Vintage Yachting Games Flag to the next host country
- Celebration

=== Fleet review ===
The fleet review of is a part of the opening ceremony of the Vintage. The element can be compared with the athletes parade into the stadium at the opening of the Olympics.

=== The races of the Vintage Yachting Games ===
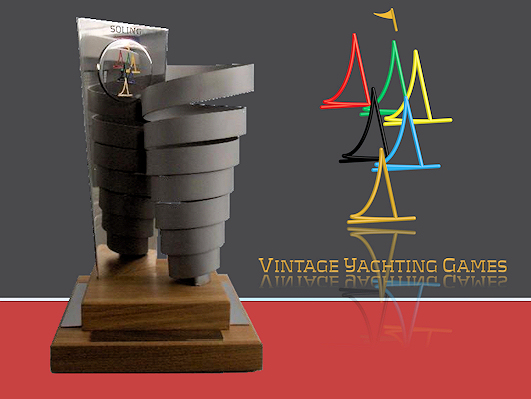
Perpetual trophy of the Vintage Yachting Games (one trophy per event). On the base the winners of the Vintages are engraved. On the backplane the Olympic medalists of the class are stated.

Each edition of the Vintage Yachting Games will have a series of at least seven scheduled races per Vintage Yachting Class. At least five races must be completed to make a valid series. The top three of each Vintage class are granted the right to fly the Vintage Yachting Games logo in gold, silver or bronze in her mainsail for the next four years.

=== Vintage InterPares race ===
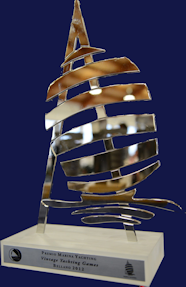
Vintage InterPares Trophy, donated by Marine Yachting

As a part of the closing ceremony the winning helmsman of each class will sail one final race in a former Olympic class. The winner will be win the title of Vintage InterPares (VIP) and is granted the right to fly the Vintage Yachting Games logo in her sail for the next four years. The VIP race is the substitute for the medalrace during the Olympic sailing event. In 2008 the 12' Dinghy was used for the VIP race.

=== Country Trophy ===
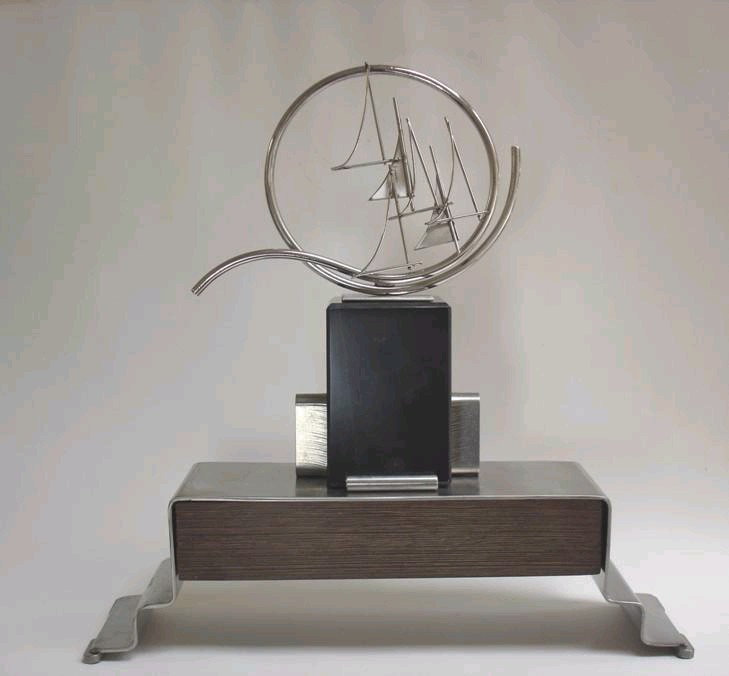
Country Trophy, created and donated by Menno Meyer

The country trophy is handed to the national team of the best performing country during an edition of the Vintage. This trophy is donated by the artist, sailor, International Judge and former international umpire Menno Meyer.

== Venues ==
Vintage Edition	Year	Venue	From	Opening	Closing	Classes	Host Club(s)
1	2008	IJsselmeer (Medemblik)	20 September	21 September	27 September	Europe, O-Jolle, Flying Dutchman, Soling, Dragon	SZ & WV Uitdam
2	2012	Lake Como (Bellano & Dervio)	7 July	8 July	14 July	Europe, O-Jolle, Flying Dutchman, Tempest, Soling, Dragon & 5.5 Metre	Multilario
3	2016	Weymouth Bay (Weymouth)	Cancelled by host club				Weymouth and Portland National Sailing Academy
3	2018	Øresund (Hellerup)	16 September	17 September	22 September	12' Dinghy, O-Jolle & Soling	Kongelig Dansk Yachtklub & Hellerup Sejlklub

== Classes ==
To become a Vintage Yachting Class a class must:

- Be a former Olympic class or former Class in the Paralympics
- Still be sailed in regattas in five or more countries
- Have one single set of class rules
- Be represented in the VYGO's supervisory board.

The Vintage Yachting Classes consist of 13 Classes. The Vintage Yachting Classes are eligible for competition in the Vintage Yachting Games.

Class	Type	Design	Sailors	Trapeze	Mainsail	Jibb/Genoa	Spinnaker	Gender	2008	2012	2018
Europe	Dinghy	One-Design	1	0	+	-	-		•	•	
Europe	Dinghy	One-Design	1	0	+	-	-		•	•	
12' Dinghy (International 12' Rule)	Dinghy	One-Design	1	0	+	-	-				•
12' Dinghy (International 12' Rule)	Dinghy	One-Design	1	0	+	-	-		VIP	VIP	VIP
2.4 Metre	Keelboat	Metre Rule	1	0	+	+	-				
O-Jolle	Dinghy	One-Design	1	0	+	-	-		•	•	•
12m² Sharpie	Dinghy	One-Design	2	0	+	+	-				
Flying Dutchman	Dinghy	One-Design	2	1	+	+	+		•	•	
Tempest	Keelboat	One-Design	2	1	+	+	+			•	
Yngling	Keelboat	One-Design	3	1	+	+	+				
Star	Keelboat	One-Design	2	0	+	+	-				
Soling	Keelboat	One-Design	3	0	+	+	+		•	•	•
Dragon	Keelboat	One-Design	285 kg max. 4	0	+	+	+		•	•	
5.5 Metre	Keelboat	Metre Rule	3	0	+	+	+			•	
6 Metre	Keelboat	Metre Rule	5	0	+	+	+				
Events									7	9	4

- • = Event in this year
- VIP = Used for the Vintage Inter Pares race
- = Open event
- = Female event
- = Male event
Current Vintage Yachting Class designs

== Facts and figures ==
These facts and figures are based upon the entries documented in the Official Vintage Results and on the Wikipedia pages:

- 2008 Vintage Yachting Games
  - 2008 Vintage Yachting Games – Europe Female
  - 2008 Vintage Yachting Games – Europe Male
  - 2008 Vintage Yachting Games – O-Jolle
  - 2008 Vintage Yachting Games – Flying Dutchman
  - 2008 Vintage Yachting Games – Soling
  - 2008 Vintage Yachting Games – Dragon
- 2012 Vintage Yachting Games
  - 2012 Vintage Yachting Games – Women's Europe
  - 2012 Vintage Yachting Games – Men's Europe
  - 2012 Vintage Yachting Games – O-Jolle
  - 2012 Vintage Yachting Games – Flying Dutchman
  - 2012 Vintage Yachting Games – Tempest
  - 2012 Vintage Yachting Games – Soling
  - 2012 Vintage Yachting Games – Dragon
  - 2012 Vintage Yachting Games – 5.5 Metre
- 2018 Vintage Yachting Games

=== Country trophy ===
Vintage	Winning Country	Points
2008	Netherlands	3869
2012	Germany	5313
2018	Netherlands	3205

=== Medal table ===
Rank	Nation	Gold	Silver	Bronze	Total
1	Netherlands (NED)	7	6	4	17
2	Germany (GER)	2	4	4	10
3	Ukraine (UKR)	2	0	1	3
4	Denmark (DEN)	1	1	2	4
5	Austria (AUT)	1	1	1	3
6	France (FRA)	1	0	1	2
7	Finland (FIN)	1	0	0	1
7	Hungary (HUN)	1	0	0	1
7	Switzerland (SUI)	1	0	0	1
10	Spain (ESP)	0	1	2	3
11	Canada (CAN)	0	1	0	1
11	Great Britain (GBR)	0	1	0	1
11	Italy (ITA)	0	1	0	1
11	Wildcards	0	1	0	1
15	Australia (AUS)	0	0	1	1
15	Russia (RUS)	0	0	1	1
Totals (16 entries)		17	17	17	51

=== Statistics ===
The statistics are based upon the boats that are taken into account in the final results. For 2008 this were all entries. For 2012 only the paid entries.

	2008	2012	2018	Total
Netherlands Antilles (AHO)	2	2		4
Austria (AUT)	4	20	3	27
Australia (AUS)	3			3
Belgium (BEL)	3			3
Brazil (BRA)	3			3
Canada (CAN)			4	4
Czech Republic (CZE)	2			2
Denmark (DEN)	3	10	3	16
Spain (ESP)	8	4		12
Finland (FIN)		3		3
France (FRA)	8	25	1	34
Great Britain (GBR)	9		1	10
Germany (GER)	18	33	3	54
Hungary (HUN)	6	8		14
Italy (ITA)	6	39		45
Ireland (IRL)			2	2
Japan (JPN)			1	1
Netherlands (NED)	23	28	21	72
Poland (POL)	3	8		11
Portugal (POR)	3			3
Romania (ROU)	2			2
South Africa (RSA)		3		3
Russia (RUS)		10		10
Slovenia (SLO)	3	2		5
Switzerland (SUI)	2	18		20
Turkey (TUR)			1	1
Ukraine (UKR)		6	3	9
United States (USA)	3	6		9
Uganda (UGA)			1	1
Wildcards	14			14
Sailors	131	225	39	389
Countries	21	17	12	28
New countries	21	4	4	NA
Continents	4	4	4	6
New continents	4	1	1	NA
Classes	6	8	3	9
New classes	6	2	1	NA
Boats	66	113	32	211
Average class size	11	14.1	10.7	10.8
Average team size	1.9	2.0	1.4	1.8
	2008	2012	2018	Total

=== Vintage InterPares ===
Vintage	Vintage InterPares	Class
2008	(Hungary) Szabolcs Majthenyi	Flying Dutchman
2012	(Ukraine) Yevhen Braslavets	Dragon
2018	Due to weather conditions this race will be sailed on a later date in the Netherlands	

=== Medal leaders (by Vintage) ===
Vintage of	Leader	Gold	Silver	Bronze	Total
2008 Medemblik	Netherlands (NED)	3	1	1	5
2012 Lake Como	Ukraine (UKR)	2	0	0	2
2018 Copenhagen	Netherlands (NED)	3	2	2	7

=== Multiple medalists ===
Position	Sailor	Country	Period	Gold	Silver	Bronze	Total	Classes
1	Rudy den Outer	Netherlands (NED)	2008–2018	2	1	0	3	* Soling
2	Szabolcs Majthenyi	Hungary (HUN)	2008	2	0	0	2	* Flying Dutchman * Vintage Inter Pares
2	Yevhen Braslavets	Ukraine (UKR)	2012	2	0	0	2	* Dragon * Vintage Inter Pares
3	Reinier Wissenraet; Marc Reijnhoudt	Netherlands (NED)	2008–2012	1	1	0	2	* Dragon
3	Igor Yusko; Sergiy Pichugin	Ukraine (UKR)	2012–2018	1	1	0	2	* Soling

== Ranking of Vintage Gold medalists ==
The ranking is done based upon the 1964 Olympic scoring system. Best seven races count. If less than seven races are sailed 0 points are given to the cancelled (can) races.

Pos	Team	Class	Year	Entries	Place							Points							Total
1	Netherlands (NED); Willem Bleeker	12' Dinghy (International 12' Rule)	2018	19	1	1	2	1	1	1	can	1380	1380	1079	1380	1380	1380	0	7979
2	Hungary (HUN); Szabolcs Majthenyi; Andras Domokos	Flying Dutchman	2008	14	1	1	1	1	1	1	can	1247	1247	1247	1247	1247	1247	0	7482
3	Austria (AUT); Christoph Aichholzer; Philipp Zingerle	Flying Dutchman	2012	15	3	1	1	2	4	1	can	800	1277	1277	976	675	1277	0	6282
4	Netherlands (NED); Reinier Wissenraet; Gijs Evers; Marc Reijnhoudt	Dragon	2008	12	1	2	3	3	1	1	can	1180	879	703	703	1180	1180	0	5825
5	Switzerland (SUI); Cornelia Christen; Ruedi Christen	Tempest	2012	15	2	1	6	6	1	1	can	976	1277	499	499	1277	1277	0	5805
6	Ukraine (UKR); Igor Yushko; Sergiy Pichugin; Dmitriy Yarmolenka	Soling	2012	13	3	2	3	2	1	1	can	738	914	738	914	1215	1215	0	5734
7	Netherlands (NED); Ton op de Weegh	O-Jolle	2012	20	5	5	1	1	1	can	can	703	703	1402	1402	1402	0	0	5612
8	Germany (GER); Svenja Puls	Europe (Female)	2008	10	1	1	1	2	1	5	can	1101	1101	1101	800	1101	402	0	5606
9	France (FRA); Thomas Ribeaud	Europe (Male)	2008	9	1	1	2	2	1	2	can	1055	1055	754	754	1055	754	0	5427
10	Netherlands (NED); Max Blom	O-Jolle	2008	9	3	1	1	2	1	3	can	578	1055	1055	754	1055	578	0	5075
11	Netherlands (NED); Rudy den Outer; Leo Determan; Ronald den Arend	Soling	2008	12	2	OCS	1	2	1	2	can	879	0	1180	879	1180	879	0	4997
12	Netherlands (NED); Rudy den Outer; Theo de Lange; Gabor Helmhout	Soling	2018	6	1	1	1	1	4	5	1	879	879	879	879	277	180	879	4852
13	Ukraine (UKR); Yevhen Braslavets; Georgii Leonchuk; Sergey Timokhov	Dragon	2012	13	2	1	4	1	5	can	can	976	1215	613	1215	516	0	0	4535
14	Finland (FIN); Anders Nordman; Robert Segercrantz; Johan Hjelt	5.5 Metre	2012	15	1	5	1	1	OCS	can	can	1277	578	1277	1277	0	0	0	4409
15	Germany (GER); Janika Puls	Europe (Female)	2012	11	2	2	1	3	2	can	can	841	841	1142	665	841	0	0	4330
16	Netherlands (NED); Thies Bosch	O-Jolle	2018	7	1	1	1	6	2	2	can	946	946	946	168	645	645	0	4296
17	Denmark (DEN); Frederik Rask	Europe (Male)	2012	11	2	3	9	2	1	can	can	841	665	188	841	1142	0	0	3677
