= Rudy den Outer =

Dutch sailor (born 1954)

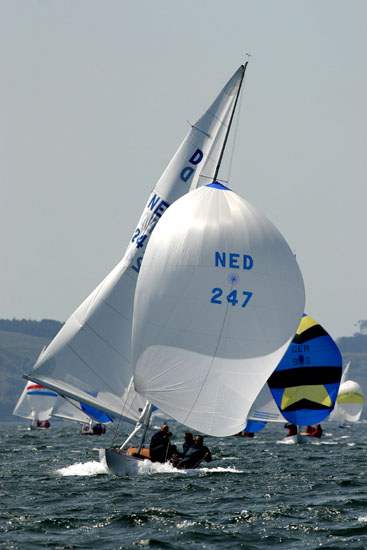
- The team of Fred Imhoff, Richard van Rij & Rudy den Outer sailing the Dragon Danish Joker.

Personal information
- Full name: Rudy den Outer
- Nationality: Dutch
- Born: 22 July 1954 (age 71) Rotterdam
- Height: 1.86 m (6.1 ft)

Sport

Sailing career
- Class(es): Piraat; Schakel; Spanker; Flying Dutchman; Tempest; Soling; Dragon
- Club: Kralingsche Zeil Club
Medal record
Representing Netherlands
Vintage Yachting Games
Gold medal – first place	2008 Medemblik	Soling
Silver medal – second place	2012 Bellano	Soling
Gold medal – first place	2018 Hellerup	Soling
European Championships
Gold medal – first place	2003 Kinsale	Dragon
Gold medal – first place	2021 Mandello del Lario	Soling
Bronze medal – third place	2012 Aarhus	Soling
Bronze medal – third place	2014 Quiberon	Soling
North American Championships
Gold medal – first place	2019 Kingston, Ontario	Soling
Dragon Gold Cup
Silver medal – second place	2002 Mariehamn	Dragon
- Updated on 22 January 2023

Rudy den Outer (born 22 July 1954 in Rotterdam) is a sailor from the Netherlands, who represented his country at the 2008 Vintage Yachting Games in Medemblik, as helmsman in the Dutch Soling Sophie's Choice. Den Outer with crew members Leo Determan and Ronald den Arend took the gold. In the 2012 Vintage Yachting Games, this time with crew members Gavin Lidlow and Ramzi Souli, the team took the silver medal in Bellano, Italy. In 2003 with helmsman Fred Imhoff and Richard van Rij he became European Champion in the Dragon at Kinsale, Ireland. Den Outer is also very active in the organization of major international sailing events for Olympic and former Olympic classes.

== Sailing career ==
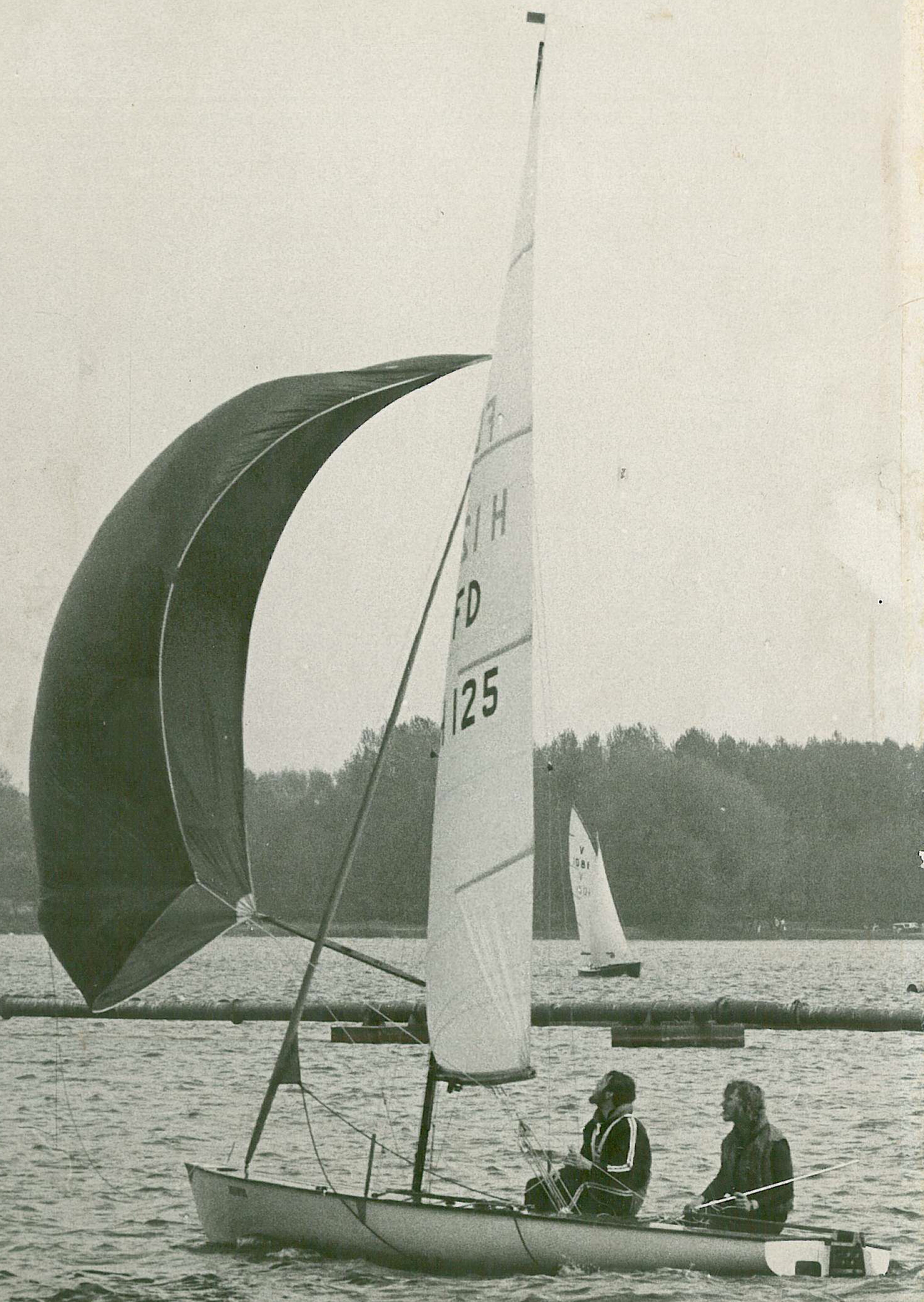
Leo Determan and Rudy den Outer (left) in the Flying Dutchman Aquarius on the Kralingsche Plas, Netherlands in 1970

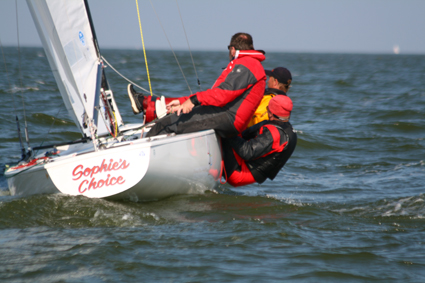
Rudy den Outer, Leo Determan and Ronald den Arend winning the 2008 Vintage Yachting Games in Medemblik.

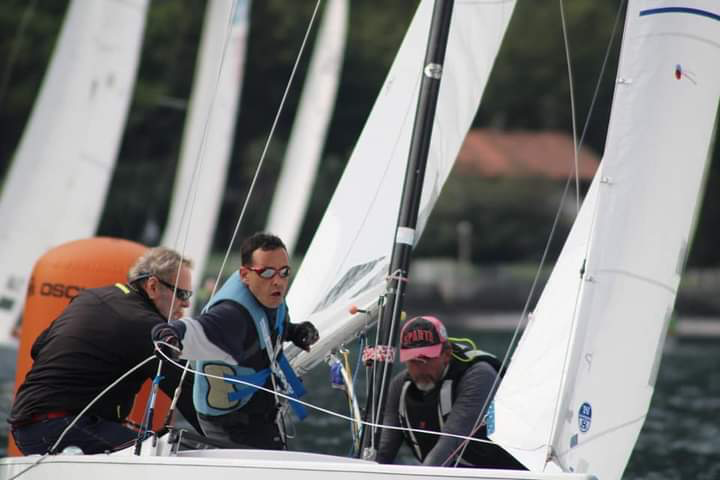
Rudy (left) in full flight during the Europeans Soling 2021 in front of Mandello del Lario

Rudy den Outer, after sailing some Dutch National classes, started his international sailing career in 1970 crewing for Leo Determan in the Flying Dutchman. In 1975, Den Outer crewed for Ben Staartjes in the Tempest. He was a member of the "Yellow Joker" sailing team of Fred Imhoff. He started crewing for Geert Bakker in the Soling in 1981. After that Rudy started to helm the Soling. During 1999 and 2001, Den Outer crewed for Heike Blok in the Dragon. Along with Richard van Rij and helmsman Fred Imhoff's he was part of the "Danisch Joker" Dragon team in 2002 and 2003. During the 2018 Vintage the Soling team of Rudy den Outer, Theo de Lange and Gabor Helmhout took the gold during challenging circumstances off the coast of Hellerup, Denmark. In 2019 den Outer as helmsman with Theo de Lange and Thies Bosch took the gold during the 2019 North American Championship 2019 on Lake Ontario, Kingston, Ontario. With Theo de Lange and Ramzi Souli Rudy became European Champion in the Soling at Mandello del Lario, Italy in 2021. Den Outer is sailing Soling on a regular basis in national and international competitions as a member of the Kralingsche Zeil Club in Rotterdam.

== Regatta organization and management ==
Rudy den Outer organized the 1990 Soling World Championship (fleetrace) in Medemblik with the Royal Yacht Club Hollandia, the 1993 Soling European Championship, and the 1988 Soling World Championship (both matchrace) at Rotterdam, Kralingen this in cooperation with the Rotterdamsche Zeilvereeniging. Den Outer took in 2006 the initiative for the Vintage Yachting Games. This event for the former Olympic classes is held every four years. Currently Den Outer is chairman of the daily board of the Vintage Yachting Games Organization. He is past committee member of the International Soling Association 3 terms from 1988 till 1997 and Past Vice-President from the same organization (1993).
