= 2012 Vintage Yachting Games =

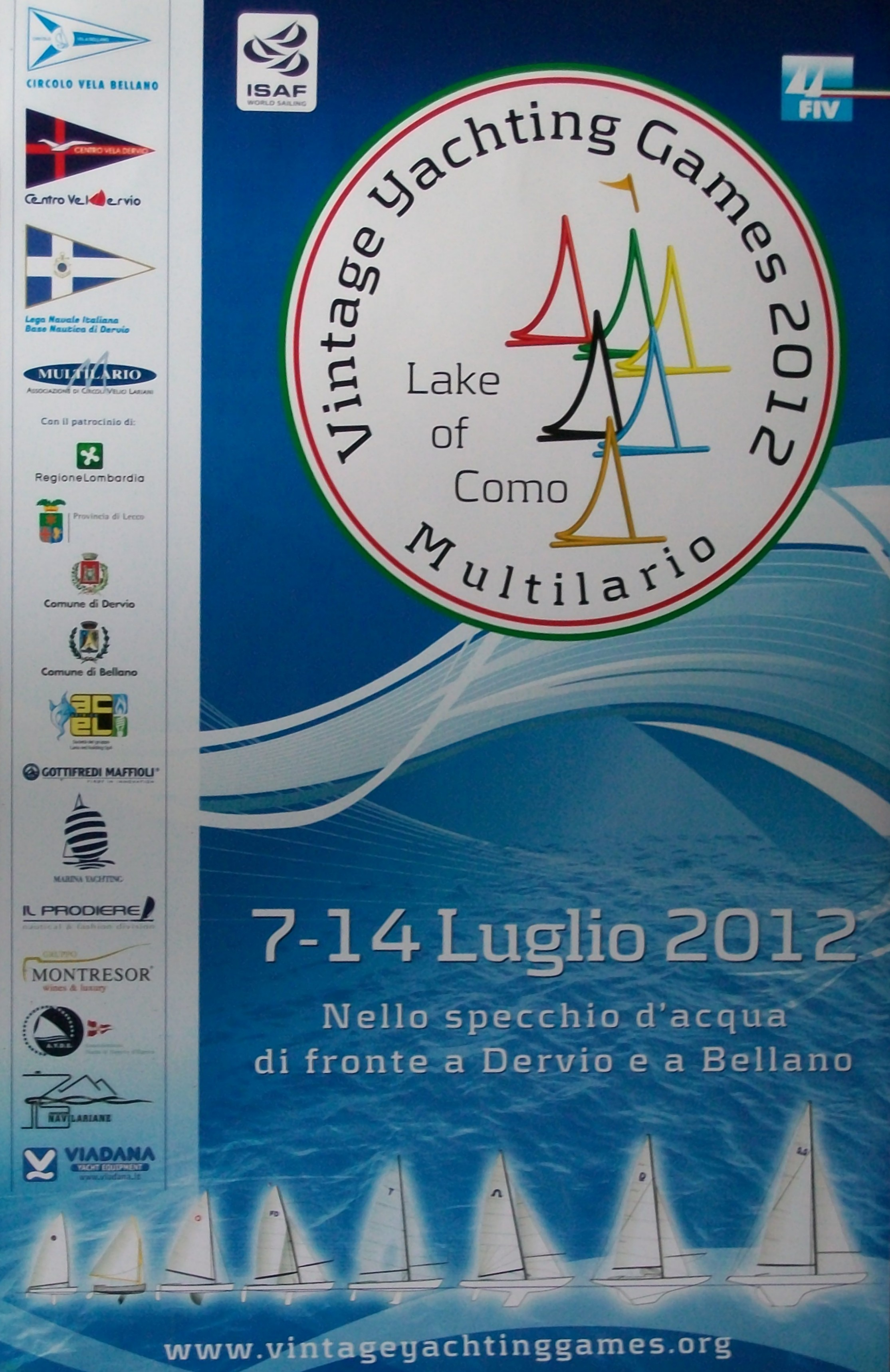
- Poster of the 2nd Vintage Yachting Games

Event title
- Edition: 2nd
- Host: Multilario

Event details
- Venue: Lake Como; Italy
- Dates: 7–14 July 2012
- Yachts: 113
- Key people: * Chairman: (Netherlands) Rudy den Outer: President Multilario 2012: (Italy) Carlo Bossi; Project manager: (Italy) Pietro Adamoli
- Opened by: Alberto Barenghi; Italy

Competitors
- Competitors: 225
- Competing nations: 17

Results
- (gold) Gold: Germany
- (silver) Silver: Netherlands
- (bronze) Bronze: Italy
- Vintage InterPares: Yevgen Braslavetz; Ukraine

Classes
- Dinghies: Europe, Europe, O-Jolle, Flying Dutchman
- Keelboats: Tempest, Soling, Dragon, 5.5 Metre
- VIP race: 12' Dinghy

The 2012 Vintage Yachting Games was the second post-Olympic multi-class sailing event for discontinued Olympic classes. The event was held on 7–14 July 2012 on Lake Como in Italy. The organization of this event was in the hands of the Multilario, a joint venture of local yacht clubs at Lake Como. The Vintage Yachting Games Organization (VYGO) was the governing organization. A total of 225 sailors in 113 boats from 17 countries competed in seven Vintage Yachting Classes.

== Prologue ==
=== Bid process ===
Multilario as organizer was chosen after a bidding process in the summer of 2008. The two other contestants were Yacht Club Cannes for the Mediterranean and Hungarian Yachting Federation for Lake Balaton. Multilario responded enthusiastic on the request of Alberto Barenghi, President of the International Flying Dutchman Class Organization and chairman of the Vintage Yachting Games Organization's supervisory board, for candidate Lake Como as host for the 2012 Vintage Yachting Games and submitted an extensive proposal based on the bidding template to the Vintage Yachting Games Organization. It was this proposal the voting classes based their vote on.

Only one voting round was needed to determine the 2012 Vintage Yachting Games location. In the voting process the Vintage Olympic Classes of 2008 each class could cast one vote and each vote counted as one. The potential 2012 classes could also each cast one vote but the outcome of the potential classes counted as one in the total.

The outcome of the voting was:

- Italy: 4
- Hungary: 0
- France: 2

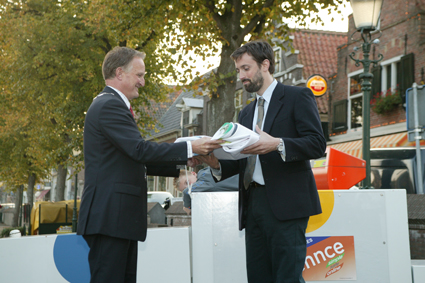
Following loosely the Olympic tradition, Como's project manager Pietro Adamoli (right) received the Vintage Yachting Games Flag during the closing ceremony of the 2008 Vintage in Medemblik, The Netherlands from the mayor of Medemblik: Theo van Eijk.

=== Kick-off and preparation ===
The Kick-off for the 2012 Vintage Yachting Games project was given on Sunday 17 May 2009 in Gravedona, Italy, during a dinner at the Associazione Velica Alto Lario. Present were the management of the Vintage Yachting Games Organization and Multilario.

A yearly meeting was held between the Vintage Yachting Games Organization and Multilario to evaluate the progress of the preparation.

== Vintage ==
=== Organization ===
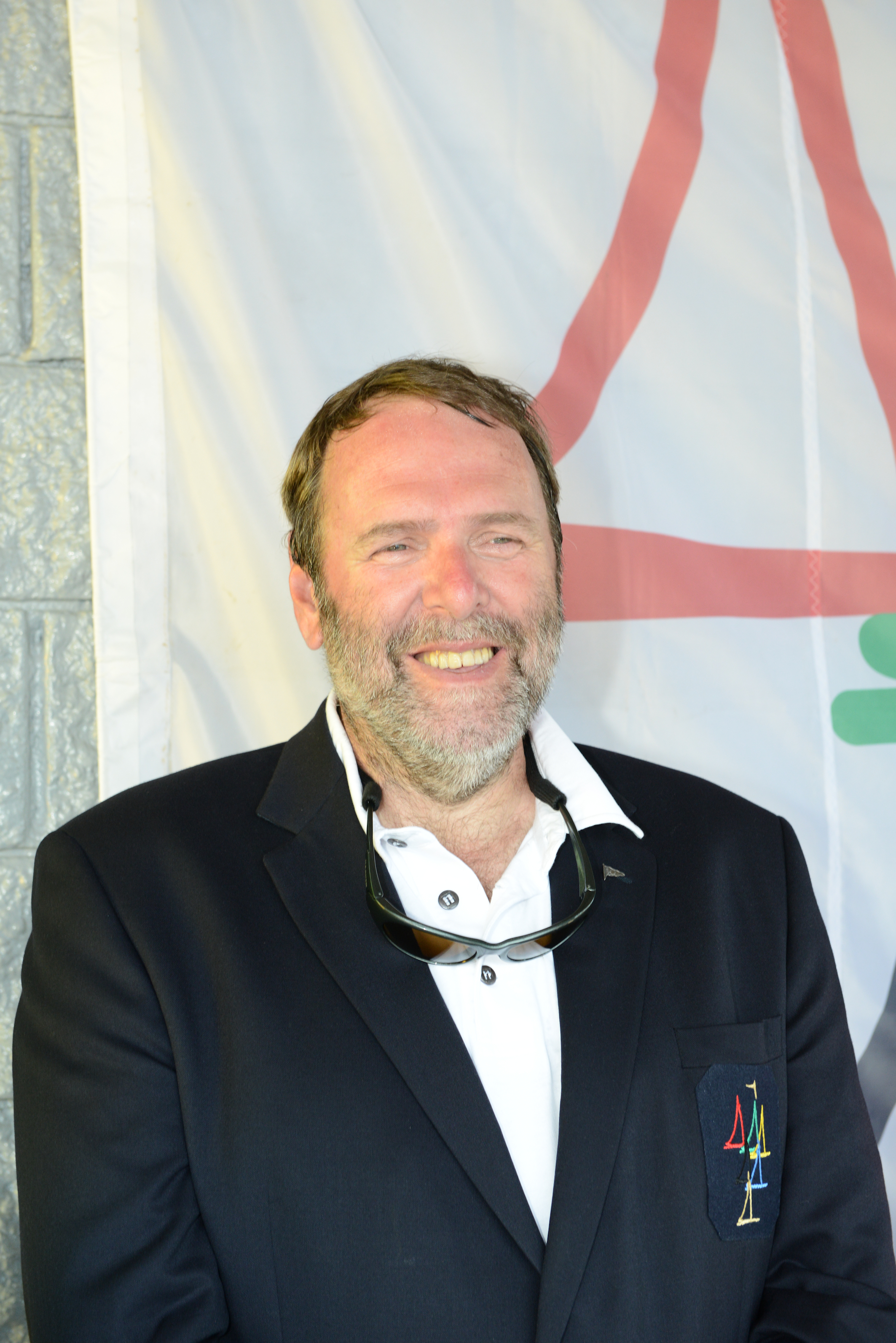
Rudy den Outer
Chairman
Vintage Yachting Games Organization

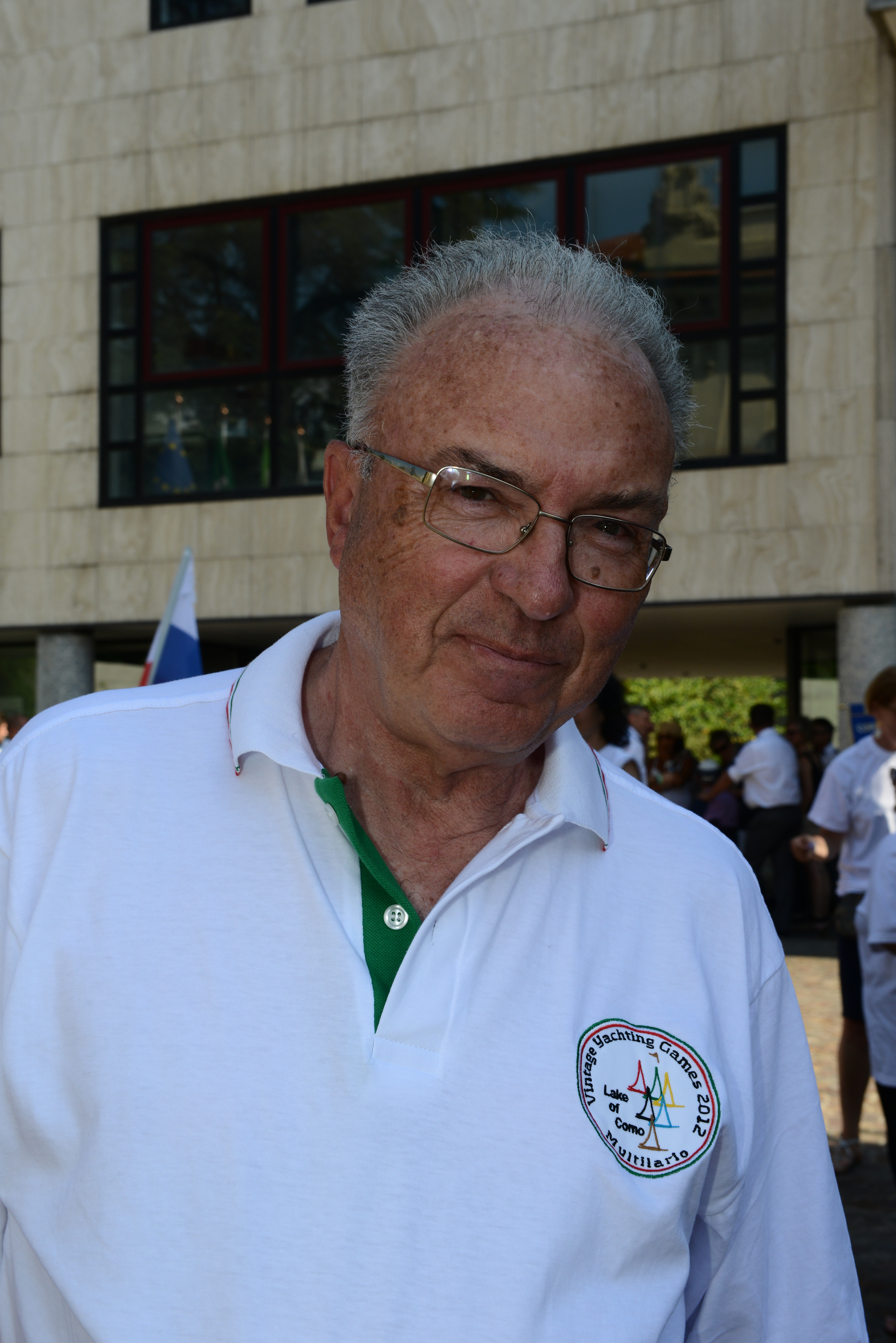
Carlo Bossi
President
Multilario

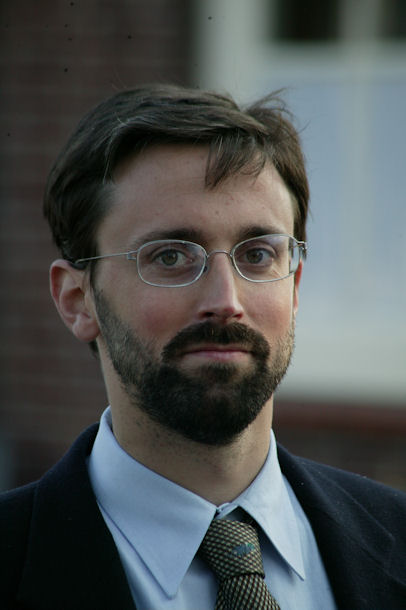
Pietro Adamoli
Project Manager
Multilario

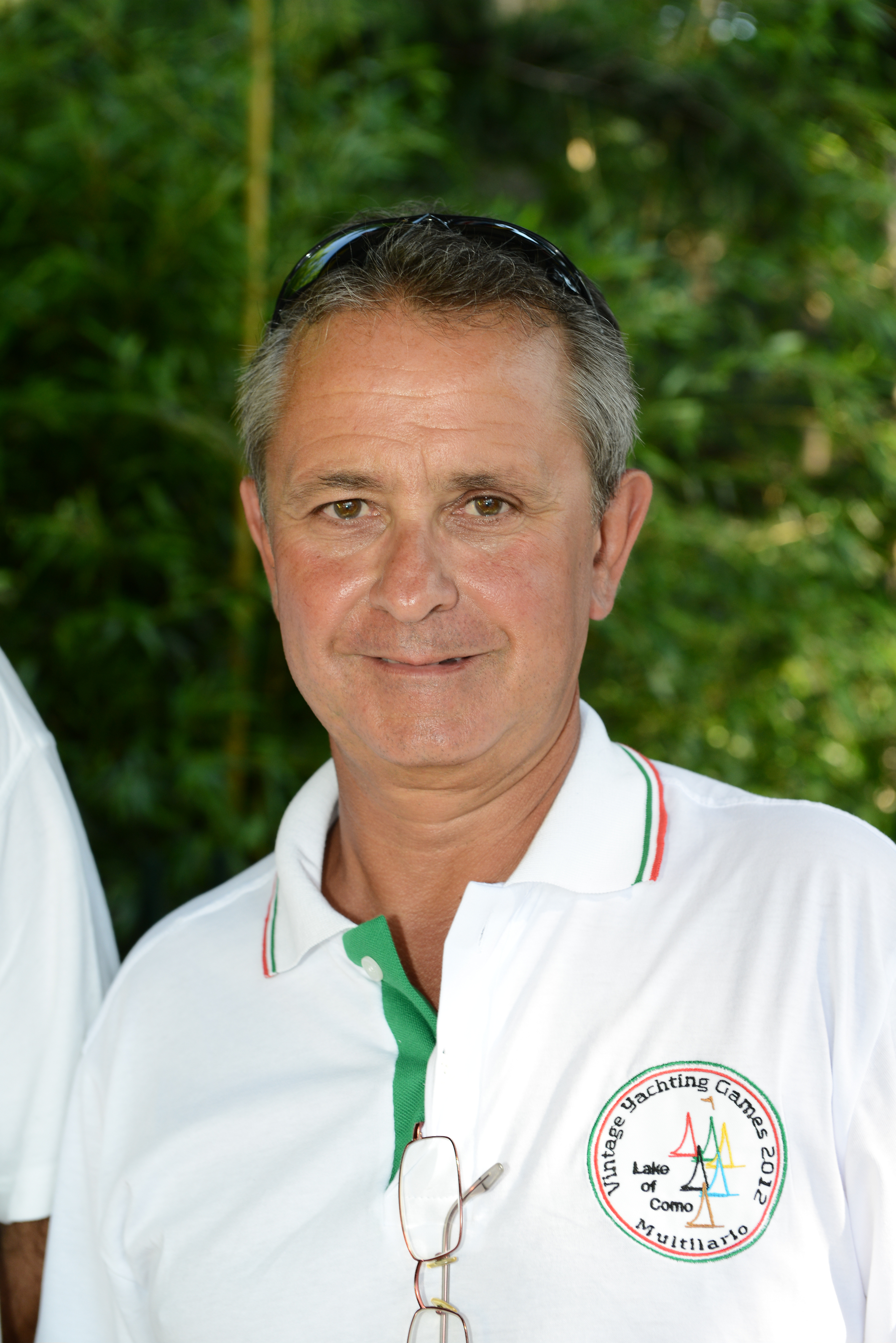
Stefano Vigano
Organizing committee
Multilario

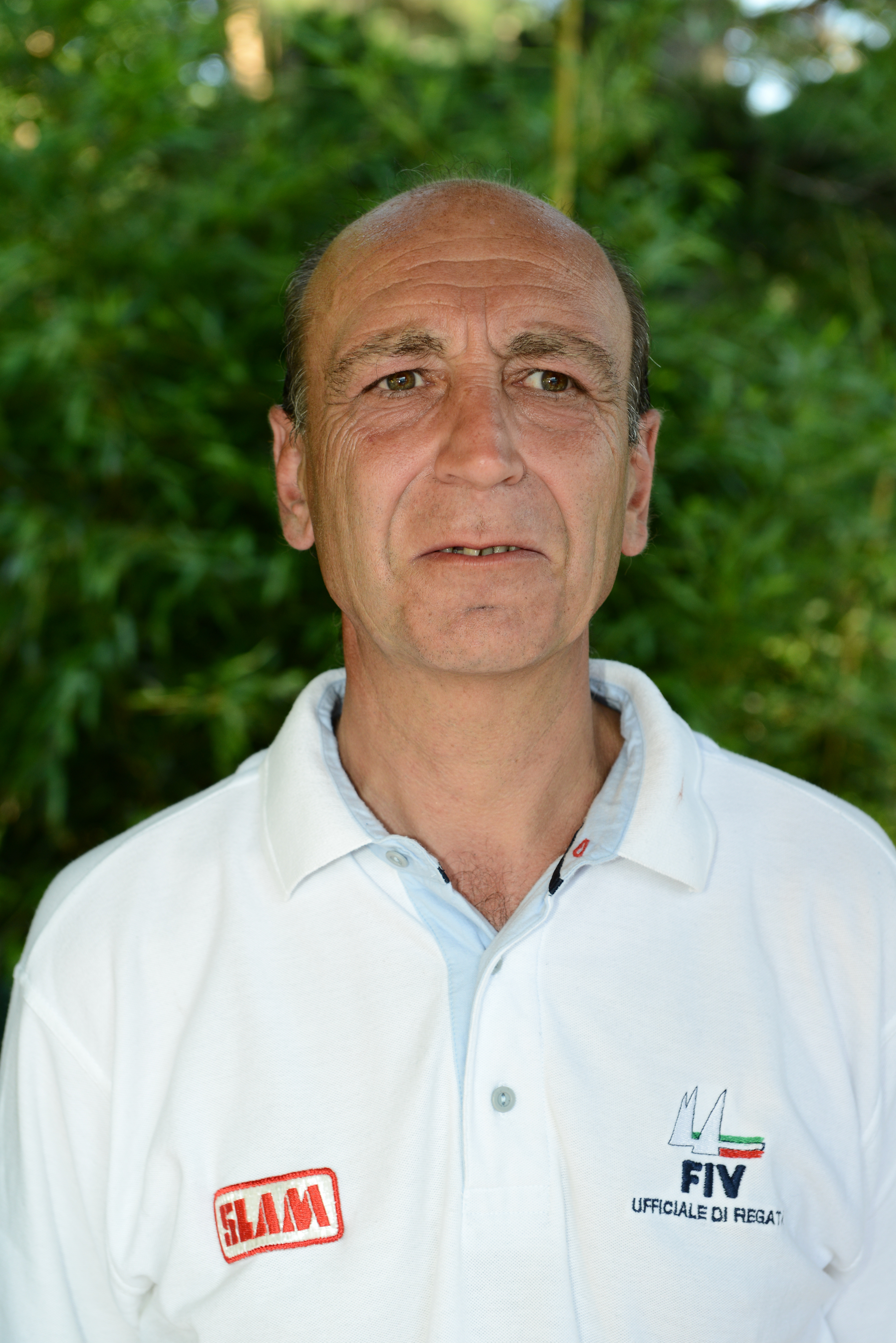
Antonio Cozzoli
Organizing committee
Multilario

			Race Management Multilario
			Carlo Bossi (Italy)
	Principal race officer		Chief measurer	Chairman of the jury
	Carlo Bossi (Italy)		John Best (United Kingdom)	Bruno Tamburini (Italy)
Campo Alpha	Campo Bravo	Campo Charlie		Members of the jury
Guido Ricetto (Italy)	Walter Ghezzi (Italy)	Giorgio Battinelli (Italy)		Frans Bolweg (IJ) (Netherlands)	Rafael Iturrioz (IJ) (Spain)	Guido Piessens (IJ) (Belgium)	Marco Sarcoli (NJ) (Italy)

=== Venues ===
Bellano
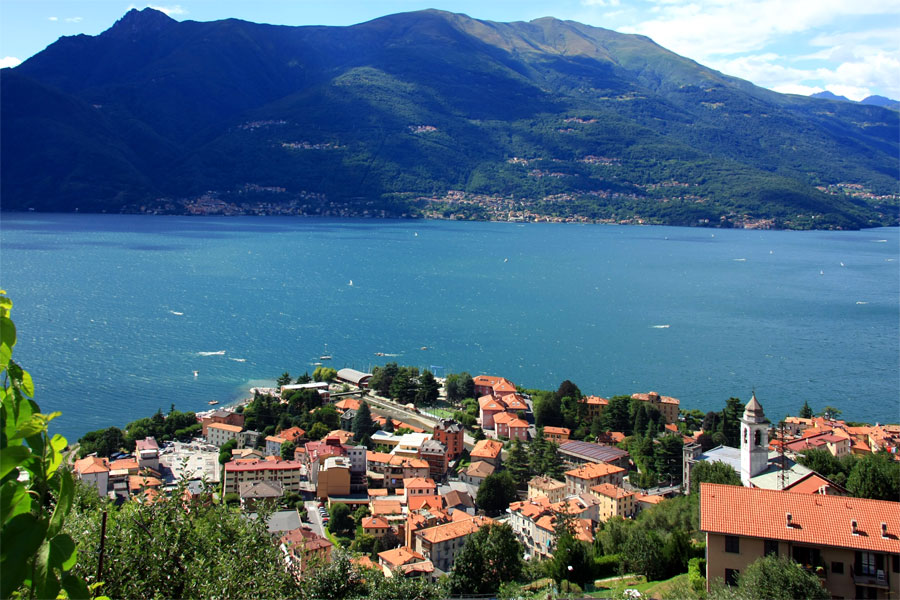
- Interactive map of Bellano
- Coordinates: 46°2′35″N 9°17′55″E
- Country: Italy
- Region: Lombardy
- Province: Lecco
- Website: https://www.comune.bellano.lc.it/

Dervio
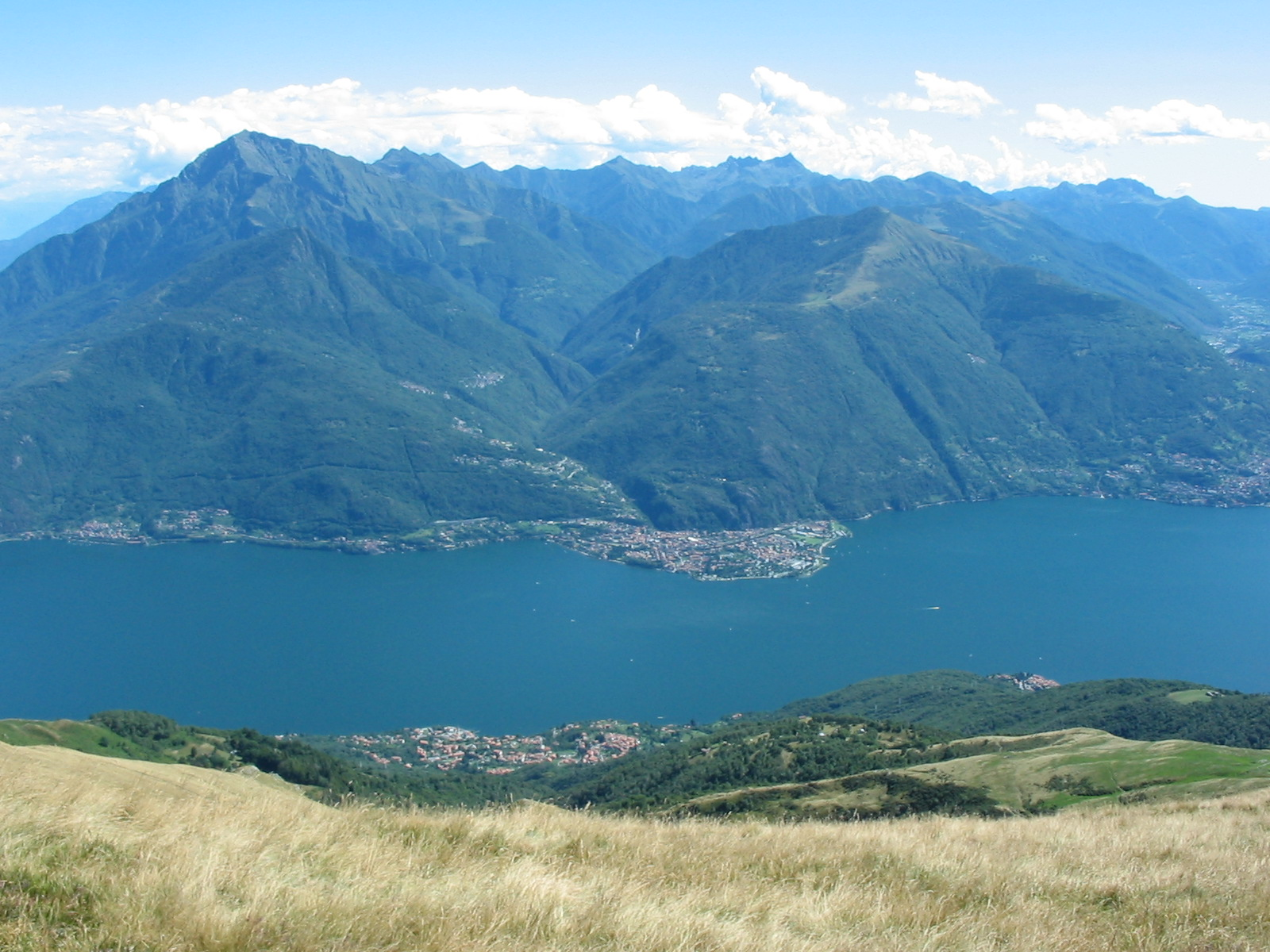
- Interactive map of Dervio
- Coordinates: 46°4′13″N 9°18′3″E
- Country: Italy
- Region: Lombardy
- Province: Lecco
- Website: http://www.dervio.org/

For the 2012 Vintage Yachting Games several venues were used to cater for the several Vintage Yachting Classes.

- Bellano
- Dervio
- Santa Cecilia Harbour in Dervio

All of them located on the east coats of the Northern part of Lake Como, Italy.

=== Wind conditions ===
The Northern part of Lake Como was reportedly a thermic wind venue. In this time of year the normal situation is that at about 13:00 the Swiss mountains are heated up and a Southern wind hits the racing areas with about 10 to 14 knots. As result of this no races were scheduled in the morning. Unfortunately during the event the temperature was low in Switzerland during the Vintage. As result the actual wind did not came above the 8 knots during the races.

=== Calendar ===
The program of the 2012 Vintage Yachting Games was as follows:

Date	Main activity	Social events
7 July (Saturday)	Registration; Measurement	
8 July (Sunday)	Registration; Measurement	Opening ceremony
9 July (Monday)	Race 1 and 2	Daily prize giving
10 July (Tuesday)	Race 3 and 4	Daily prize giving
11 July (Wednesday)	Race 5 and 6	Daily prize giving
12 July (Thursday)	Spare day	* Lake tour * Italian food plaza
13 July (Friday)	Race 7 and 8	Daily prize giving
14 July (Saturday)	Race 9	Closing ceremony * VIP race (12' Dinghy) * Prize giving * Passing of the flag

=== Competition ===
Continents	Countries	Classes	Boats	Sailors
4	17	8	113	225

Sailors at the 2012 Vintage Yachting Games
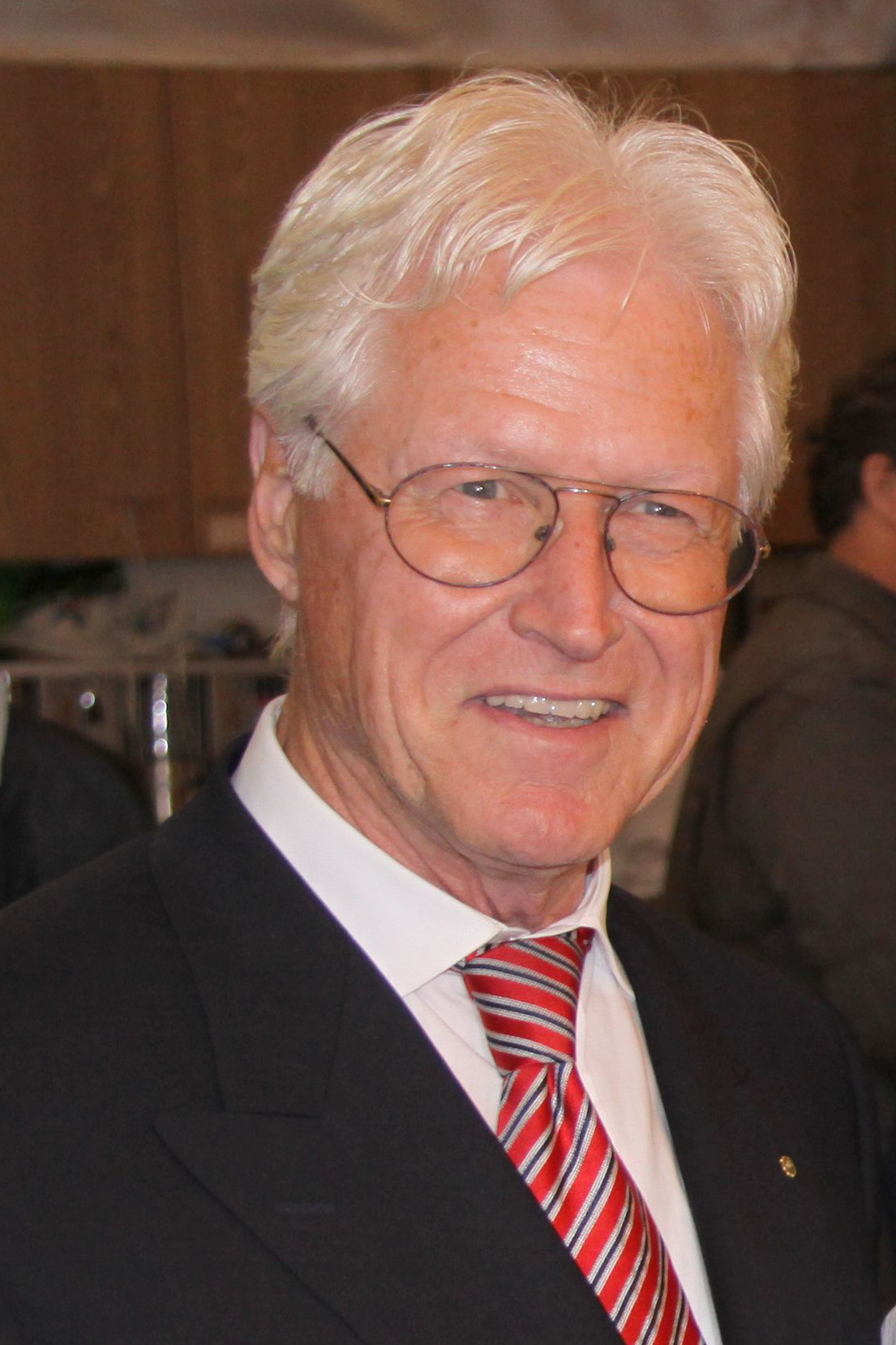
In Tempest:
de:Rolf Bähr

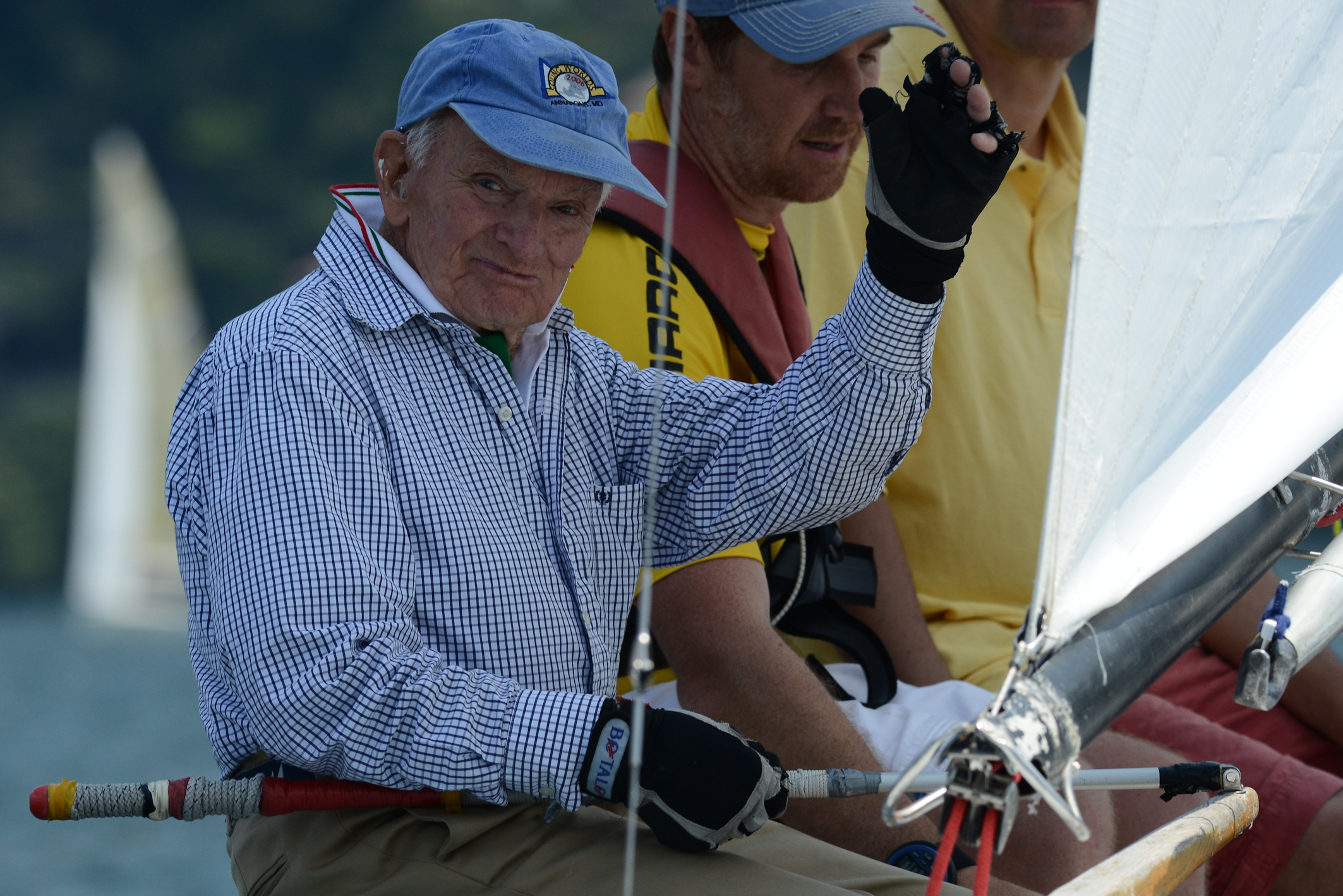
In Soling:
Stuart H. Walker

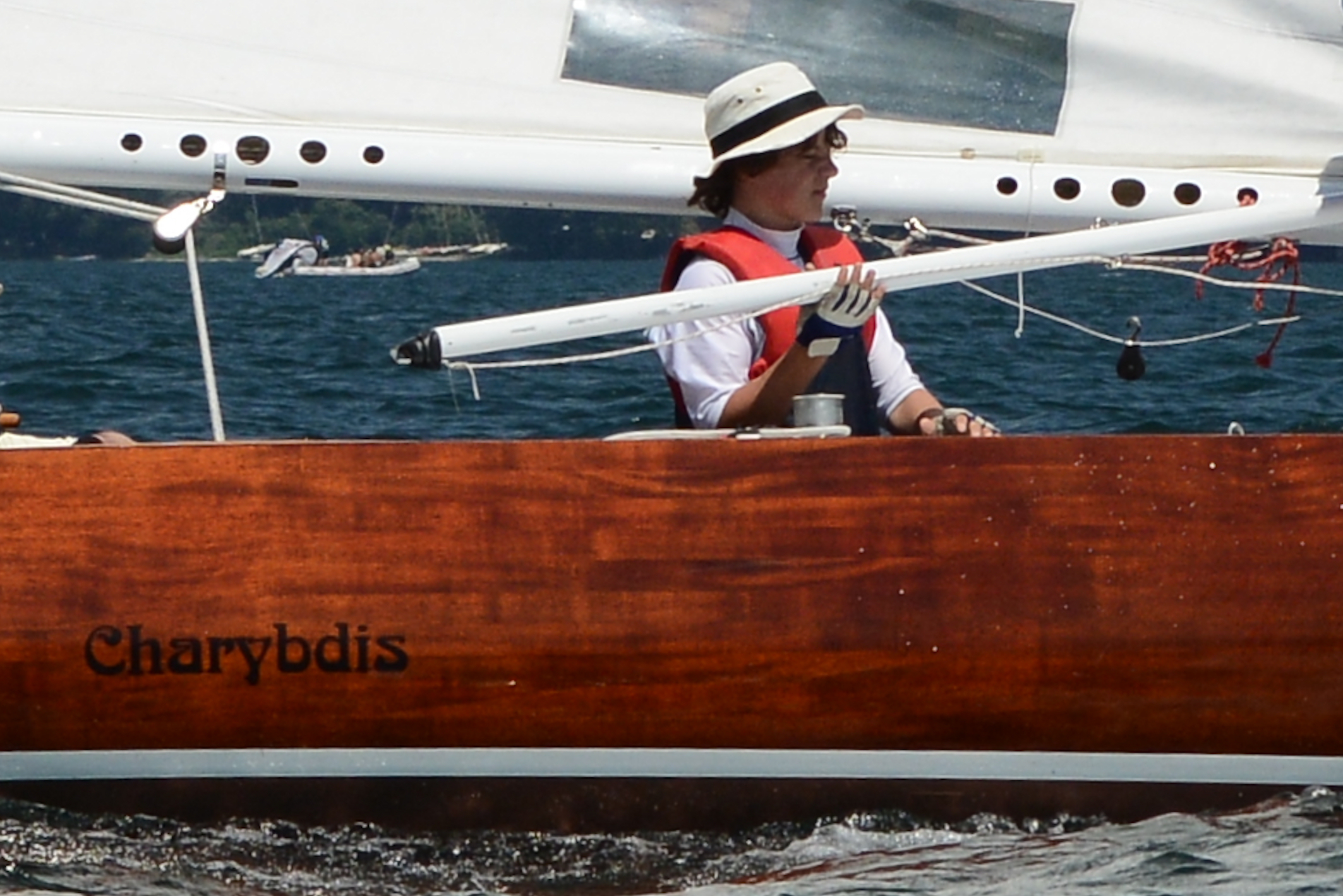
In 5.5 Metre:
Johannes Alvarez
- Rolf Bähr: Multiple World Champion Tempest, President German National Sailing Authority
- Stuart H. Walker: Olympic participant 1968, rear president of the International Soling Class, successful lifetime regatta sailor and author of many books on sailing and winning. Oldest participant during the 2012 Vintage (89)
- Johannes Alvarez: Youngest participant during the 2012 Vintage (13)

=== Continents ===
- Africa
- Europe
- North America
- South America

=== Countries ===
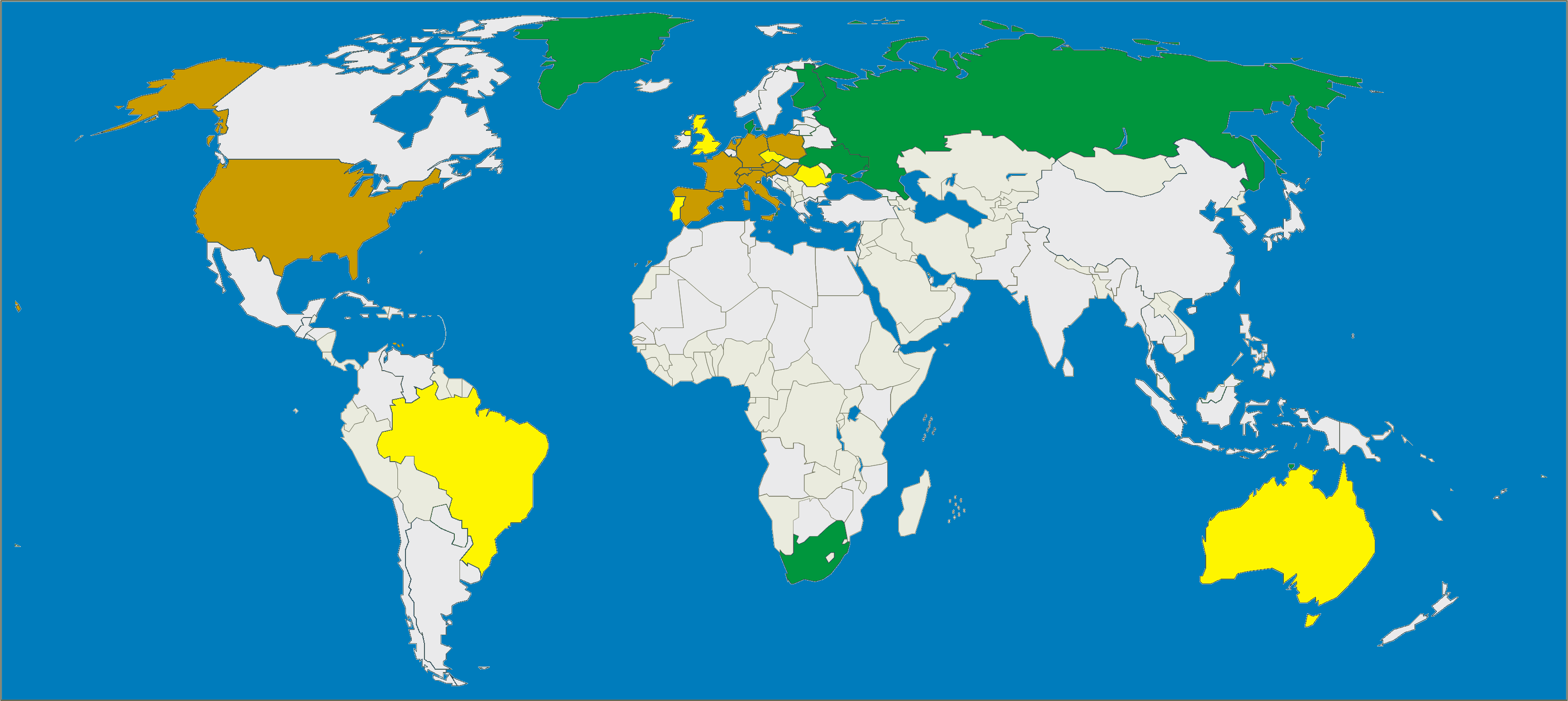
Countries that participated in the 2012 Vintage Yachting Games. Blue: Water Gray: Never participated in the Vintage Yellow: Participated in earlier Vintages Green: Country participated in her first Vintage Gold: Country participated also on previous Vintages

Netherlands Antilles	Austria	Denmark
Spain	Finland	France
Germany	Hungary	Italy
Netherlands	Poland	Russia
South Africa	Slovenia	Switzerland
Ukraine	United States

=== Vintage Yachting Classes ===
Class	Type	Event	Sailors	Trapeze	Mainsail	Jib/Genoa	Spinnaker	First Vintage	Vintages	Boats
Europe (Female)	Dinghy		1	0	+	-	-	2008	2	11
Europe (Male)	Dinghy		1	0	+	-	-	2008	2	11
12 foot dinghy	Dinghy	Vintage InterPares Race	1	0	+	-	-	2008	2	8
O-Jolle	Dinghy		1	0	+	-	-	2008	2	20
Flying Dutchman	Dinghy		2	1	+	+	+	2008	2	14
Tempest	Keelboat		2	1	+	+	+	2012	1	15
Soling	Keelboat		3	0	+	+	+	2008	2	13
Dragon (keelboat)	Keelboat		3	0	+	+	+	2008	2	13
5.5 Metre	Keelboat		3	0	+	+	+	2012	1	15

Vintage Yachting Classes active during the 2012 Vintage Yachting Games
Pictures of the Active Vintage Yachting Classes 2012 at Lake Como
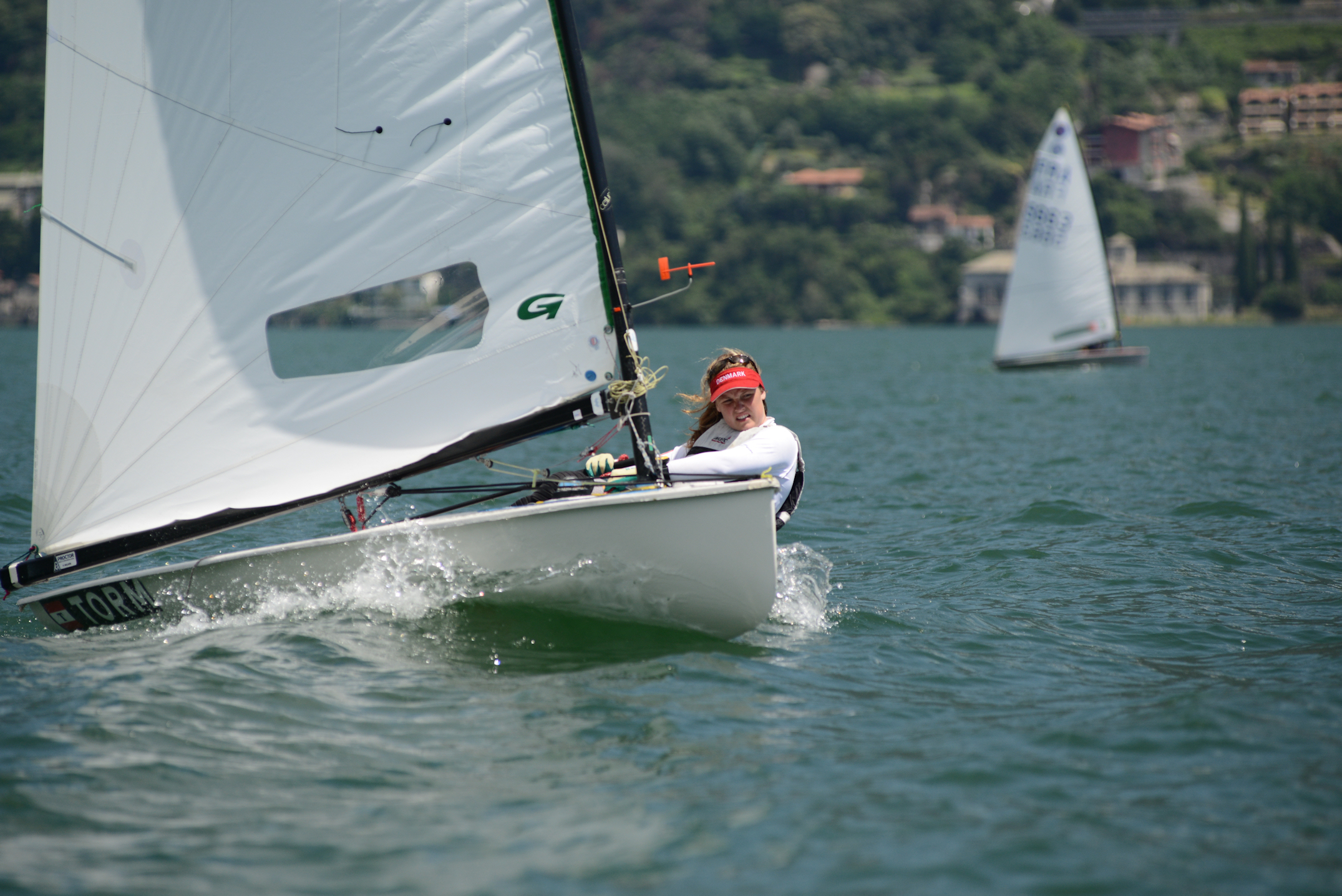
Europe

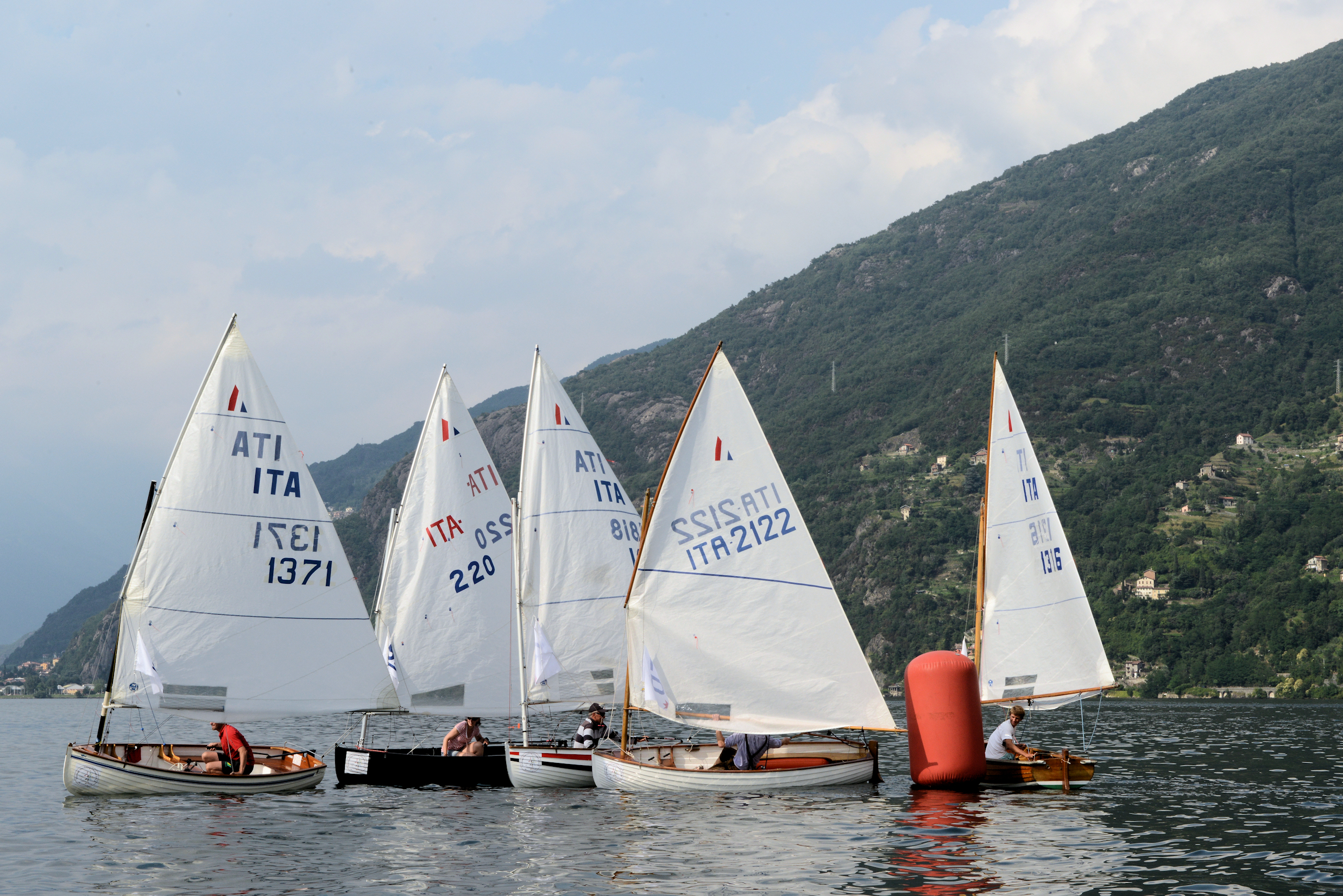
12' Dinghy

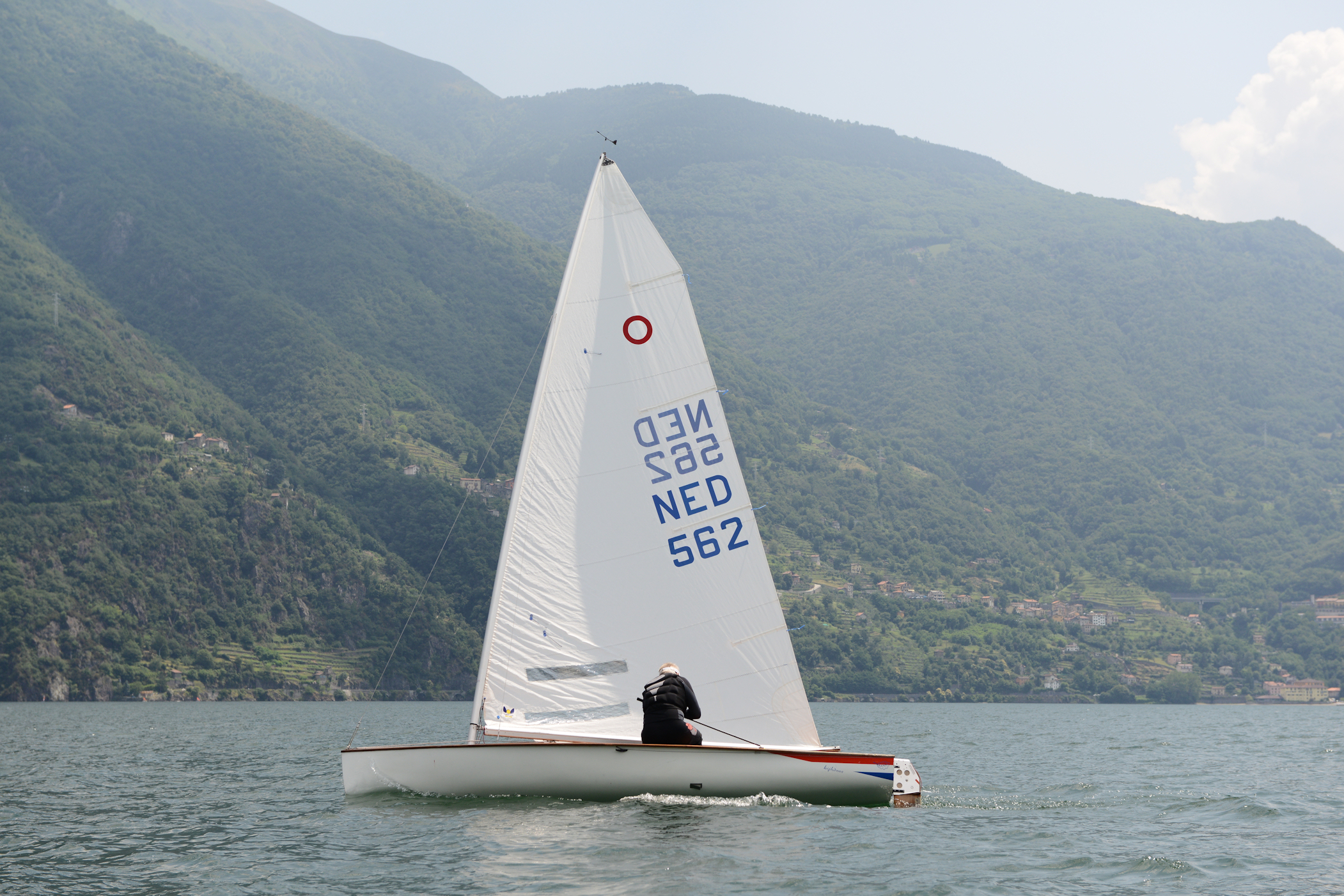
O-Jolle

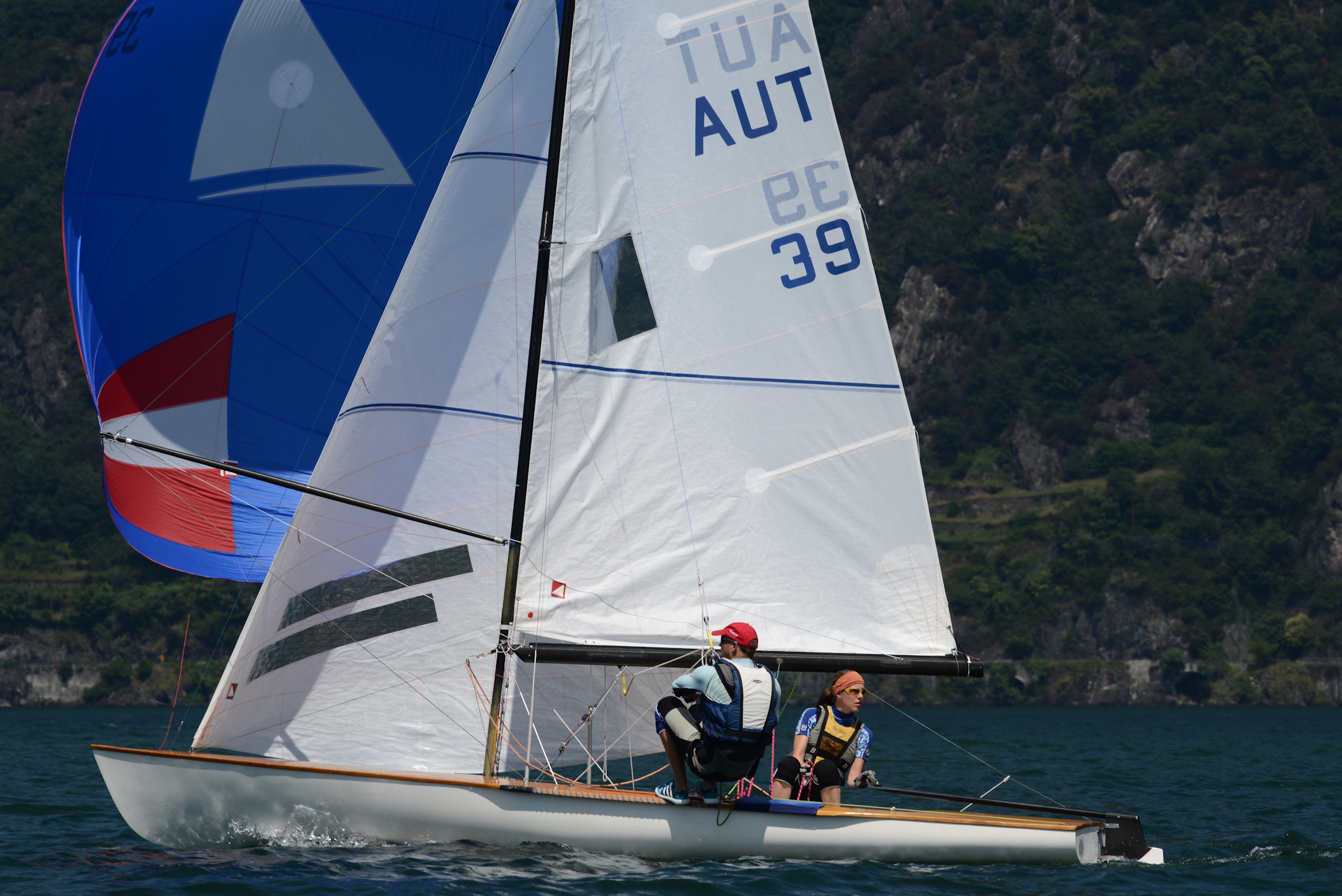
Flying Dutchman

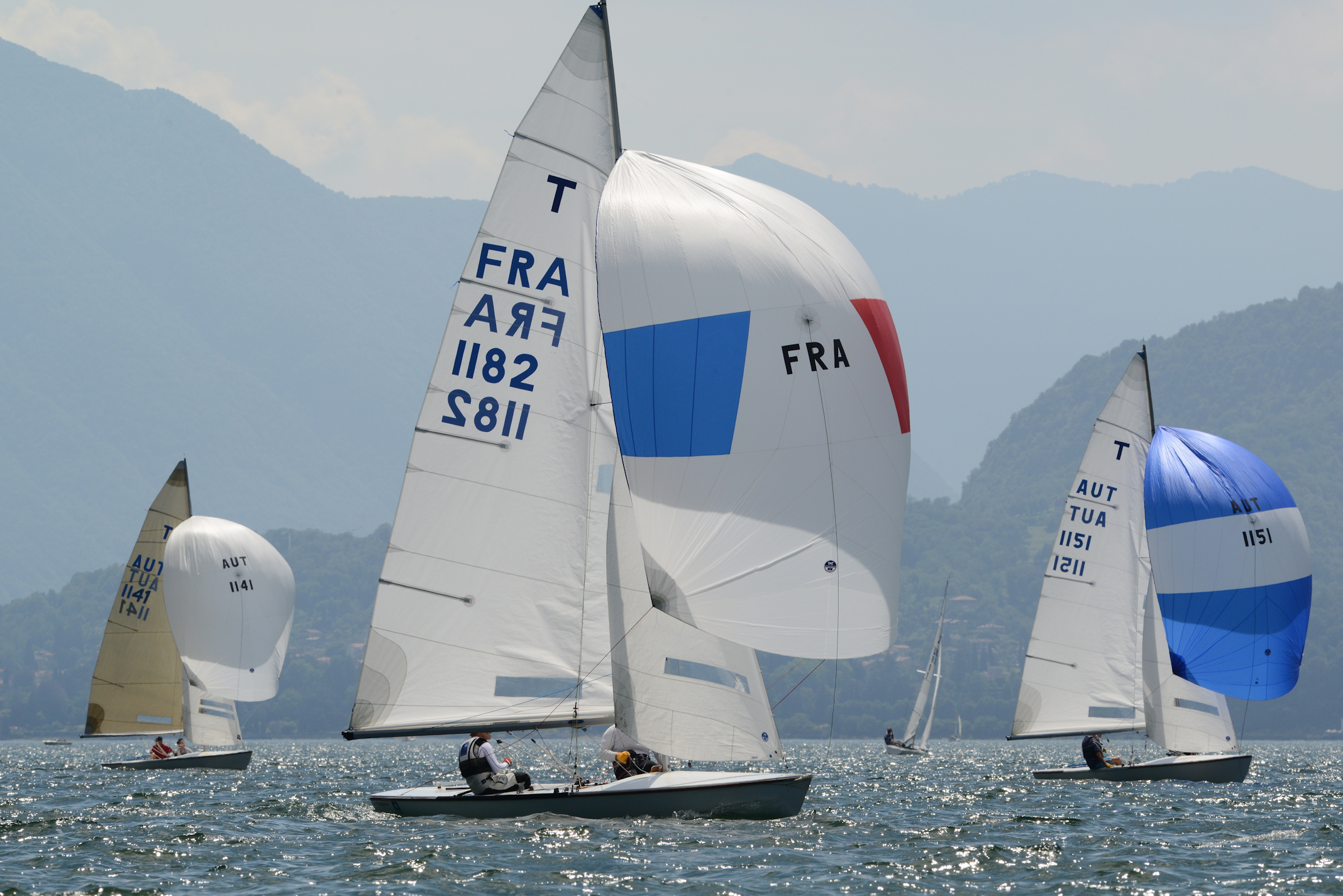
Tempest

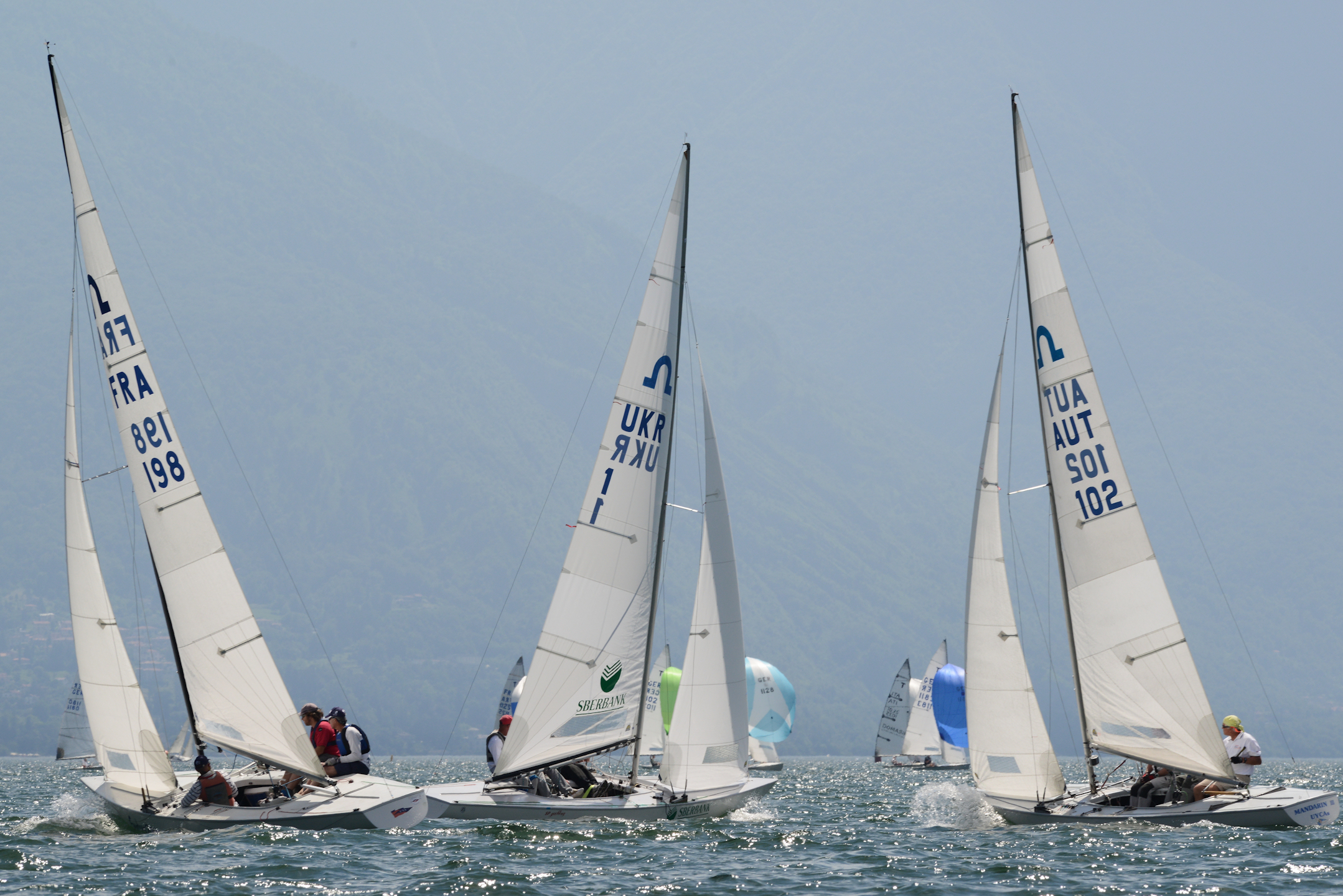
Soling

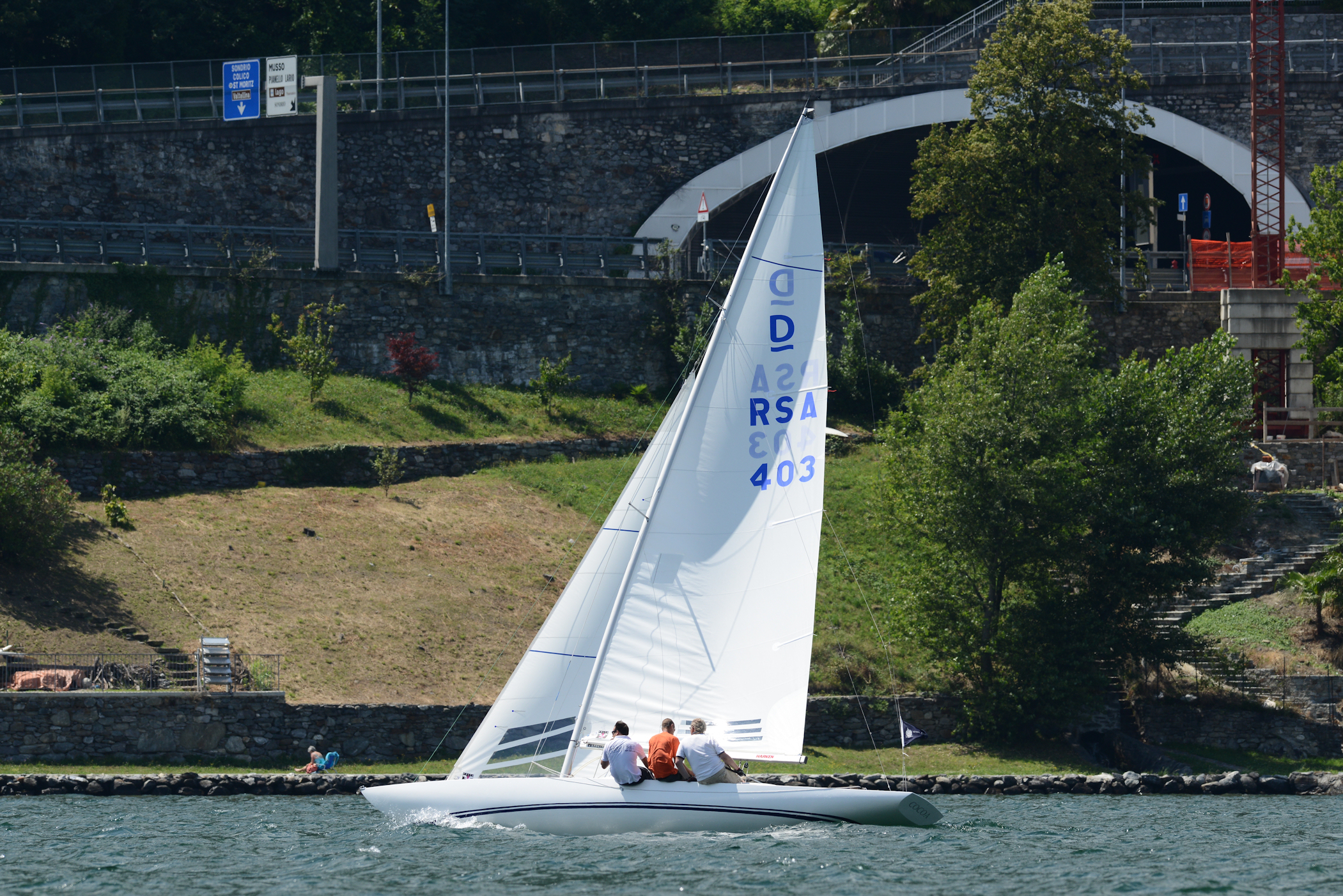
Dragon

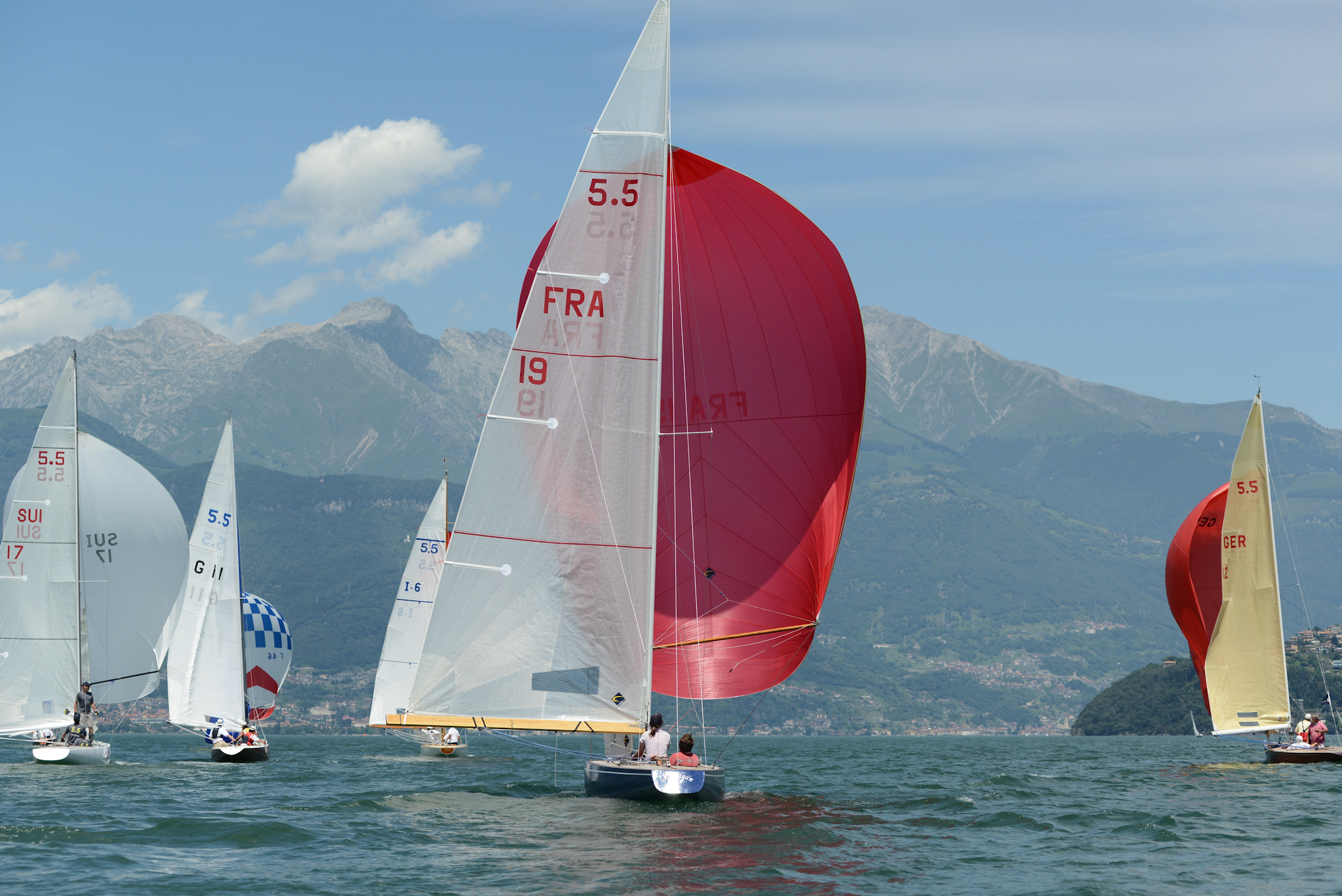
5.5 Metre

=== Measurement ===
Measurement during the Vintage Yachting Games was limited to new sails and safety equipment of the competing boats. Sails, rigging and boats used in the previous year at Continental and World championships was only "stamped". No major measurement issues were found.

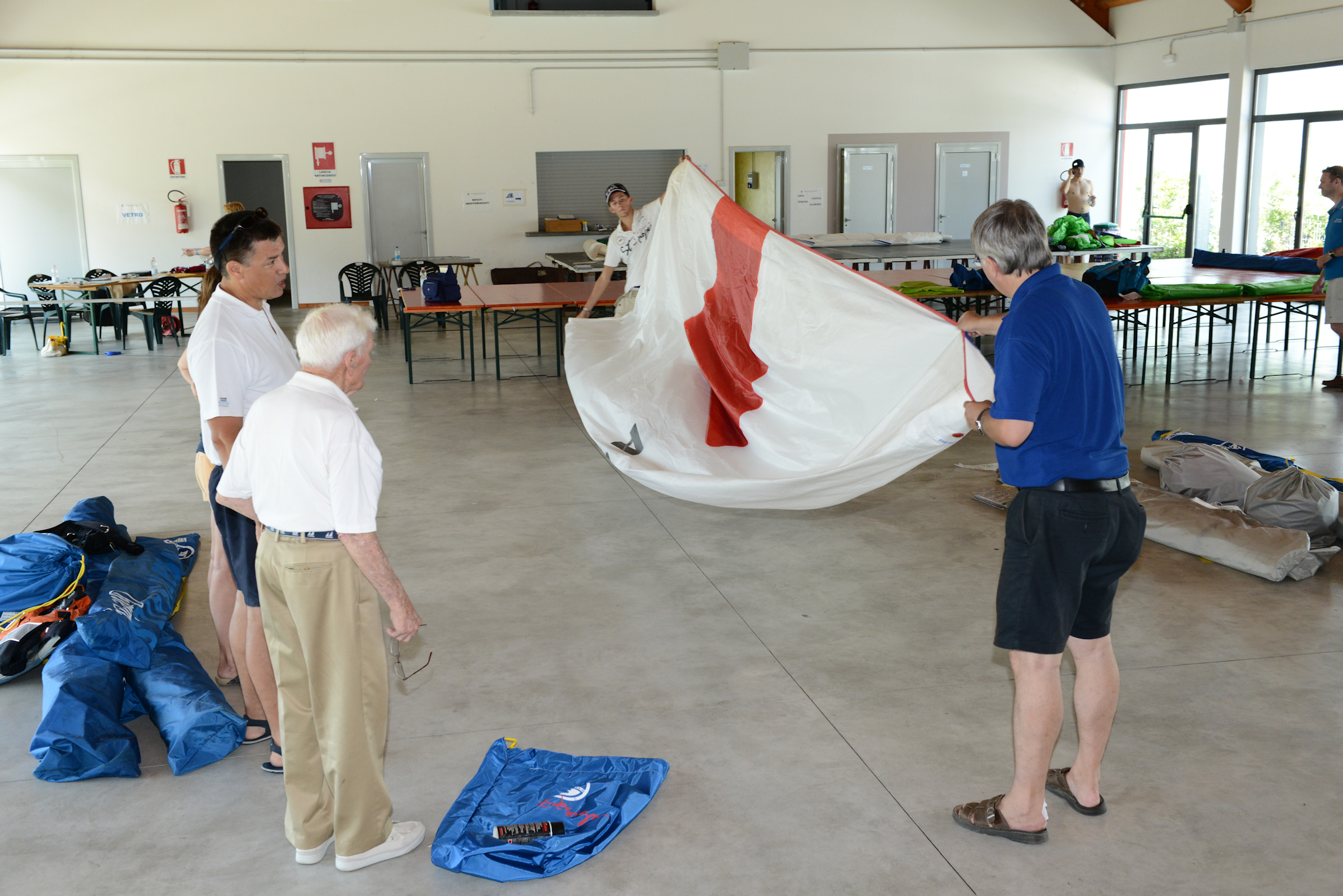
Stuart H. Walker (center) during Sail Measurement

=== Opening ceremony ===
Due to the fact of three locations: Bellano, Dervio and Santa Cecilia harbor, it was not possible to have the original planned fleet review. As alternative a fanfare followed by a long parade of sailors and organizers walked from the Dervio city hall to the Vintage meeting point near the waterfront. There the opening ceremony of the 2012 Vintage Yachting Games took place. Besides the Italian National Anthem two choirs of Italian Opera singers sung Va, pensiero from Verdi during the flag hoisting procedure. Furthermore, there were short speeches from The Vintage Yachting Games Organization, the representatives of Bellano and Dervio, the organizing clubs and the Italian Sailing Federation. Finally Alberto Barenghi, president of the International Flying Dutchman Organization and chairman of the Vintage Yachting Games supervisory board declared the games opened.

Opening of the 2012 Vintage Yachting Games
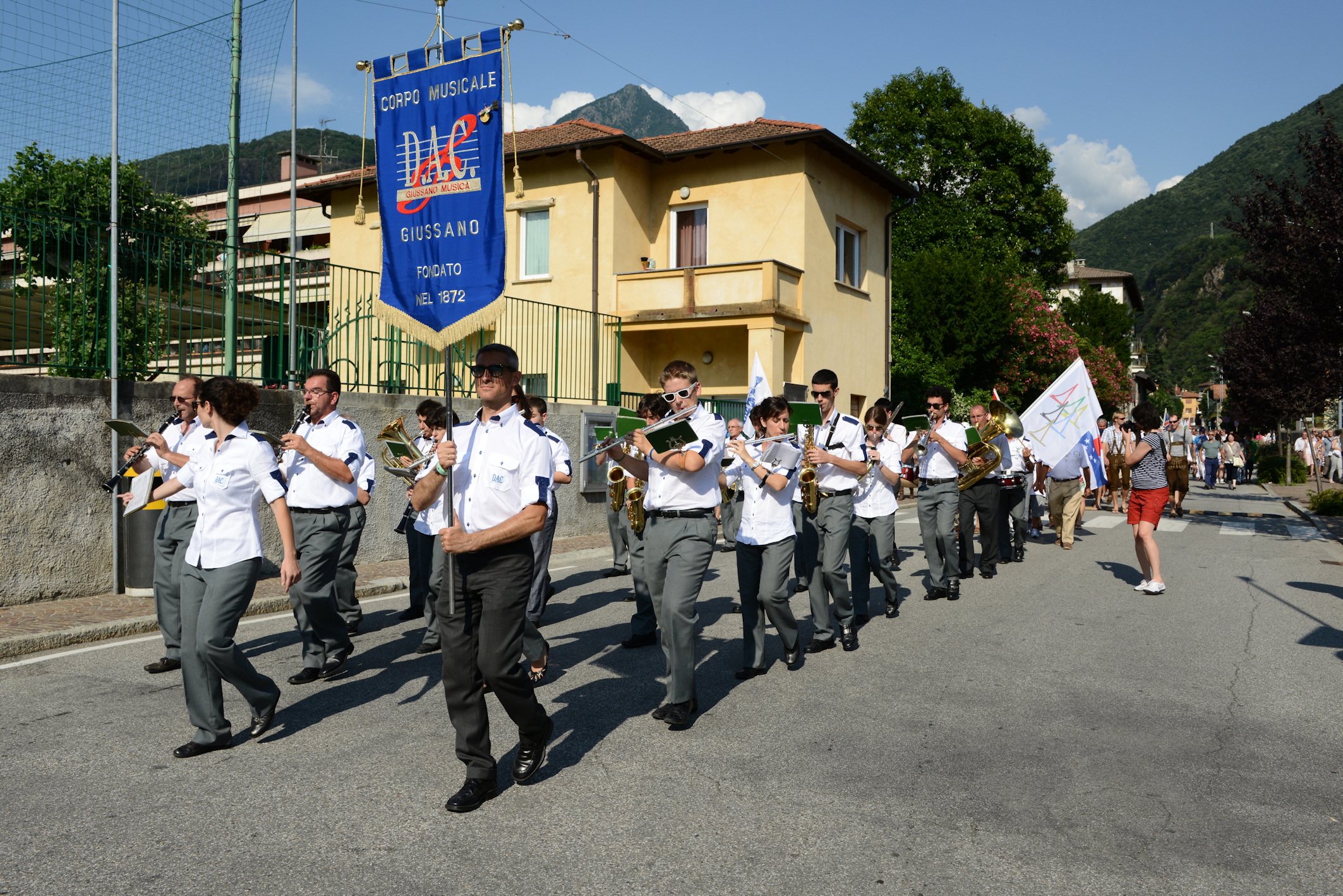

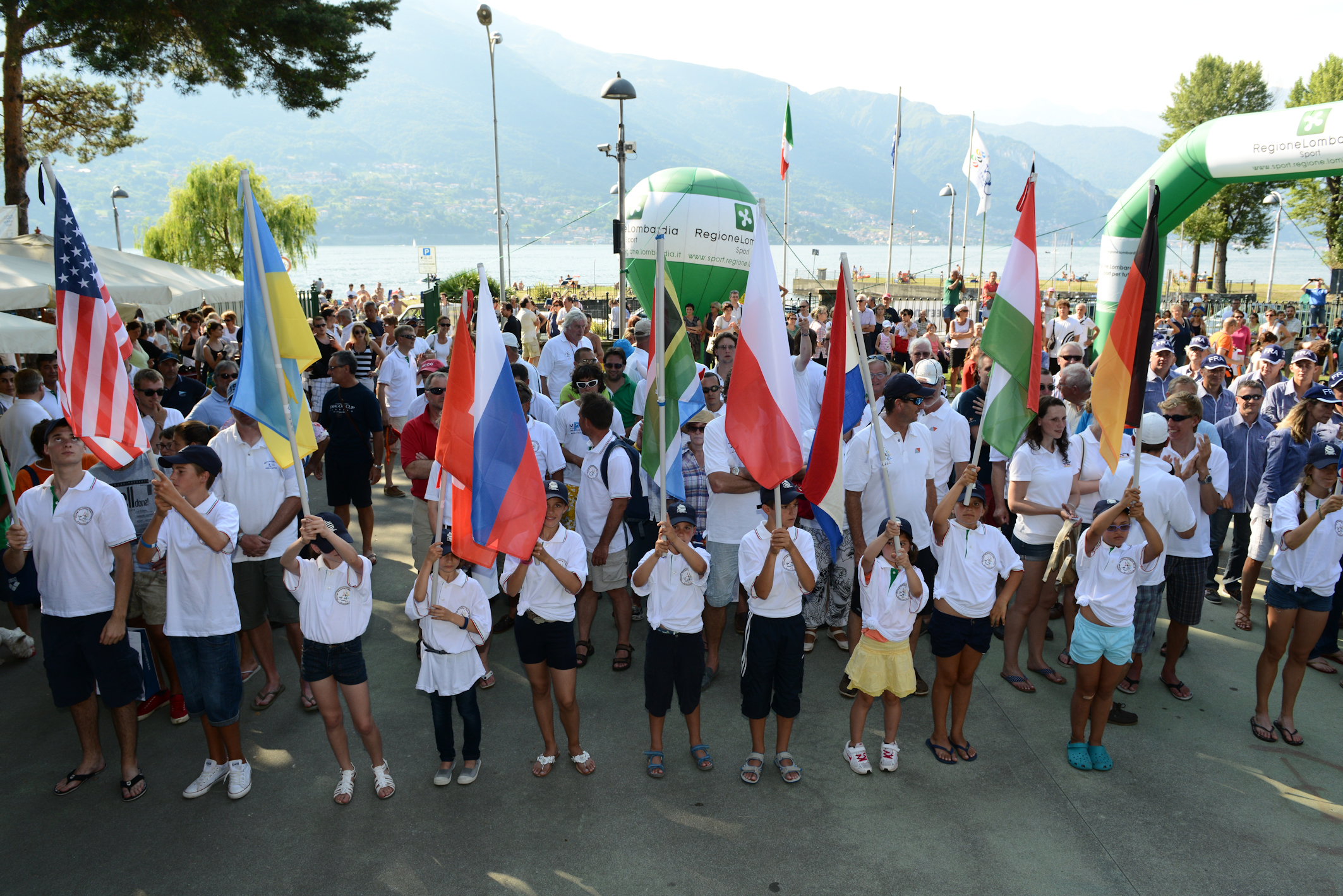
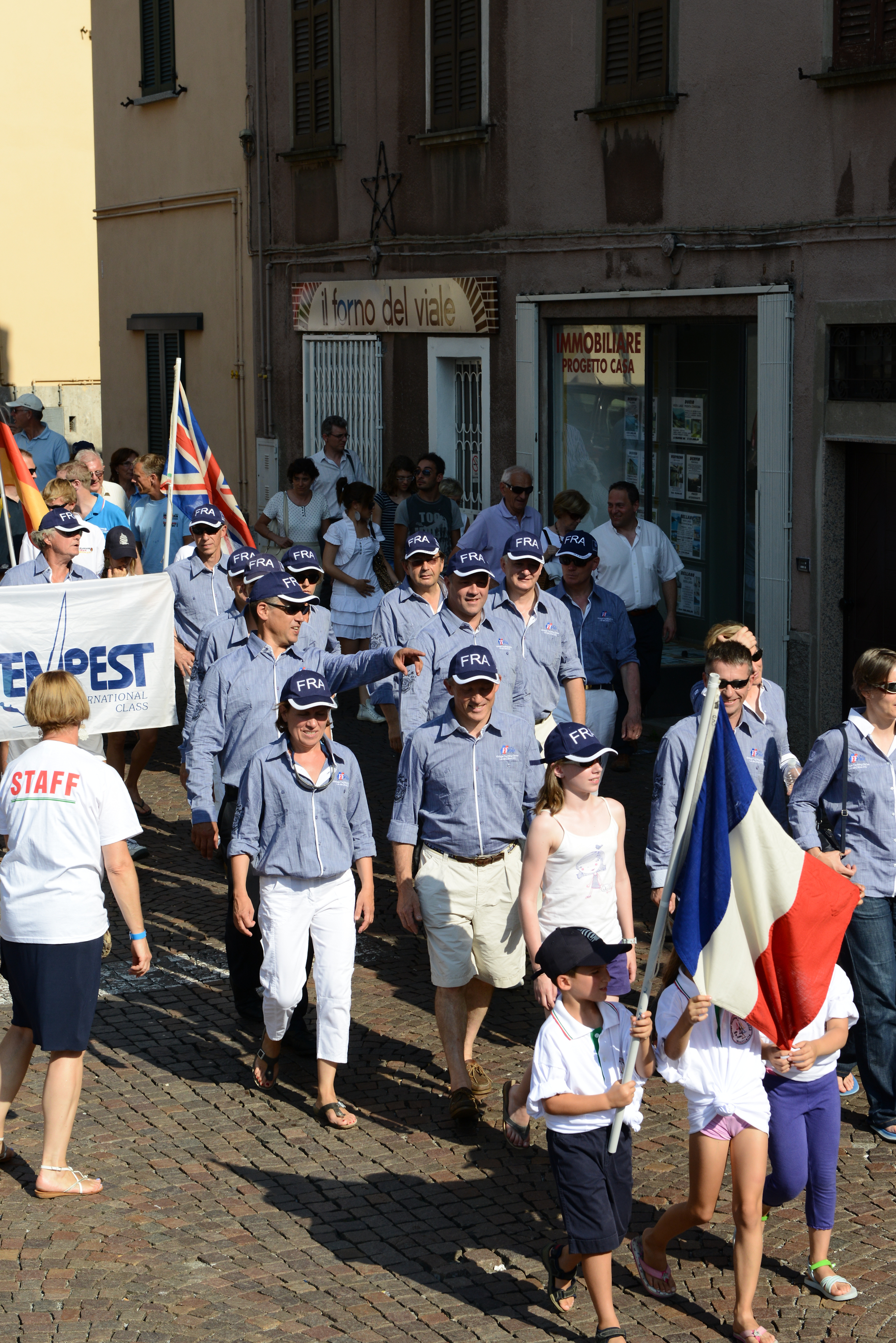
France during the opening parade

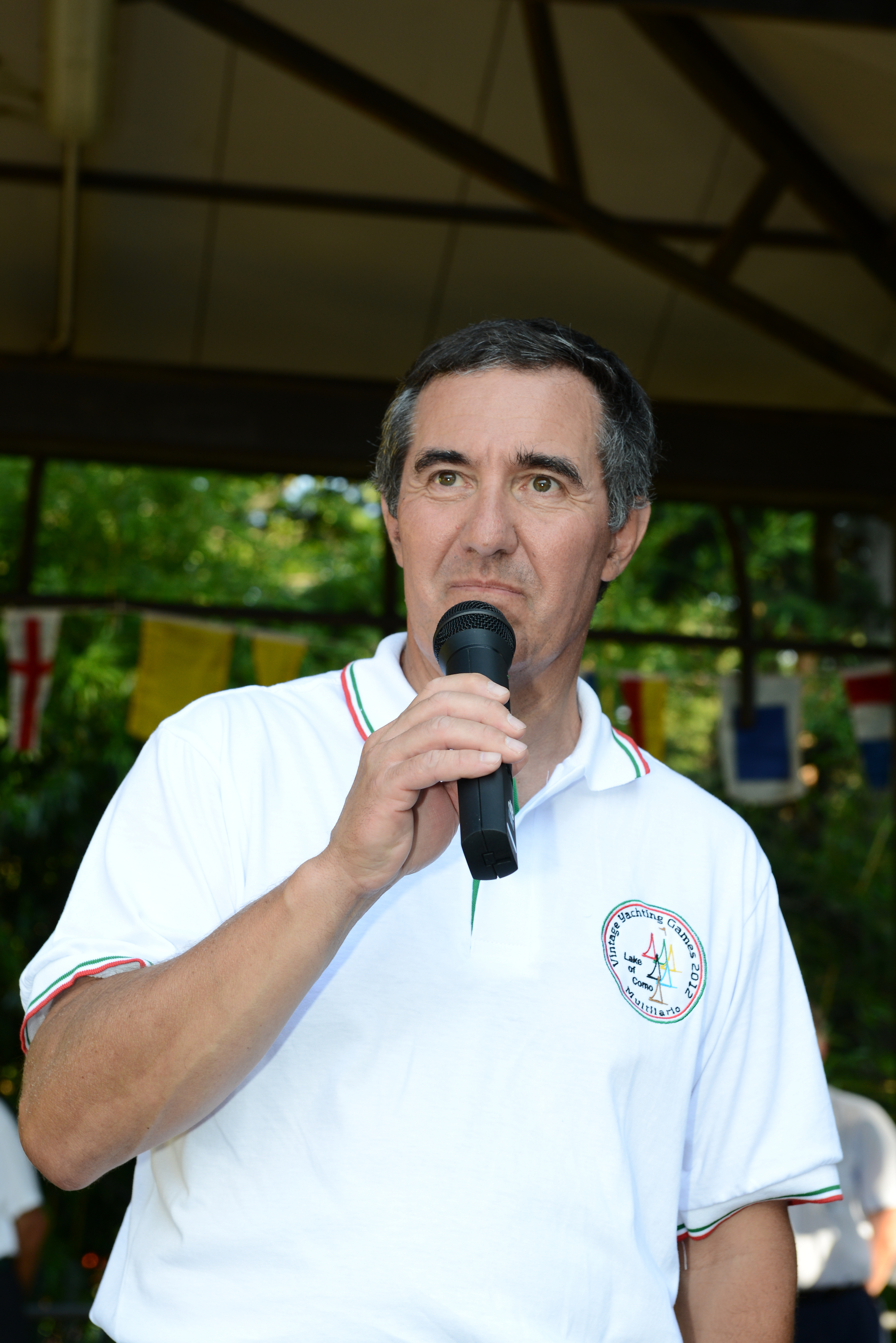
Alberto Barenghi opening the Vintage

=== Closing ceremony ===
The closing ceremony started with the Vintage InterPares race in the 12' Dinghies. This was followed by the prize giving with the team of father and daughter Maccari as presentation duo.

During the closing of the event Rudy den Outer handed over stainless remembrance plates with the Vintage logo to the cities of Bellano and Dervio. He also announced that "Weymouth and Portland National Sailing Academy", host of this year's Olympic sailing regatta, will be the host of the 2016 Vintage Yachting Games. After that the Vintage flag was received from Pietro Adamoli and Carlo Bossi, representing the Multilario organization. The flag was subsequently handed over to John Best representing Great Britain as the next host country.

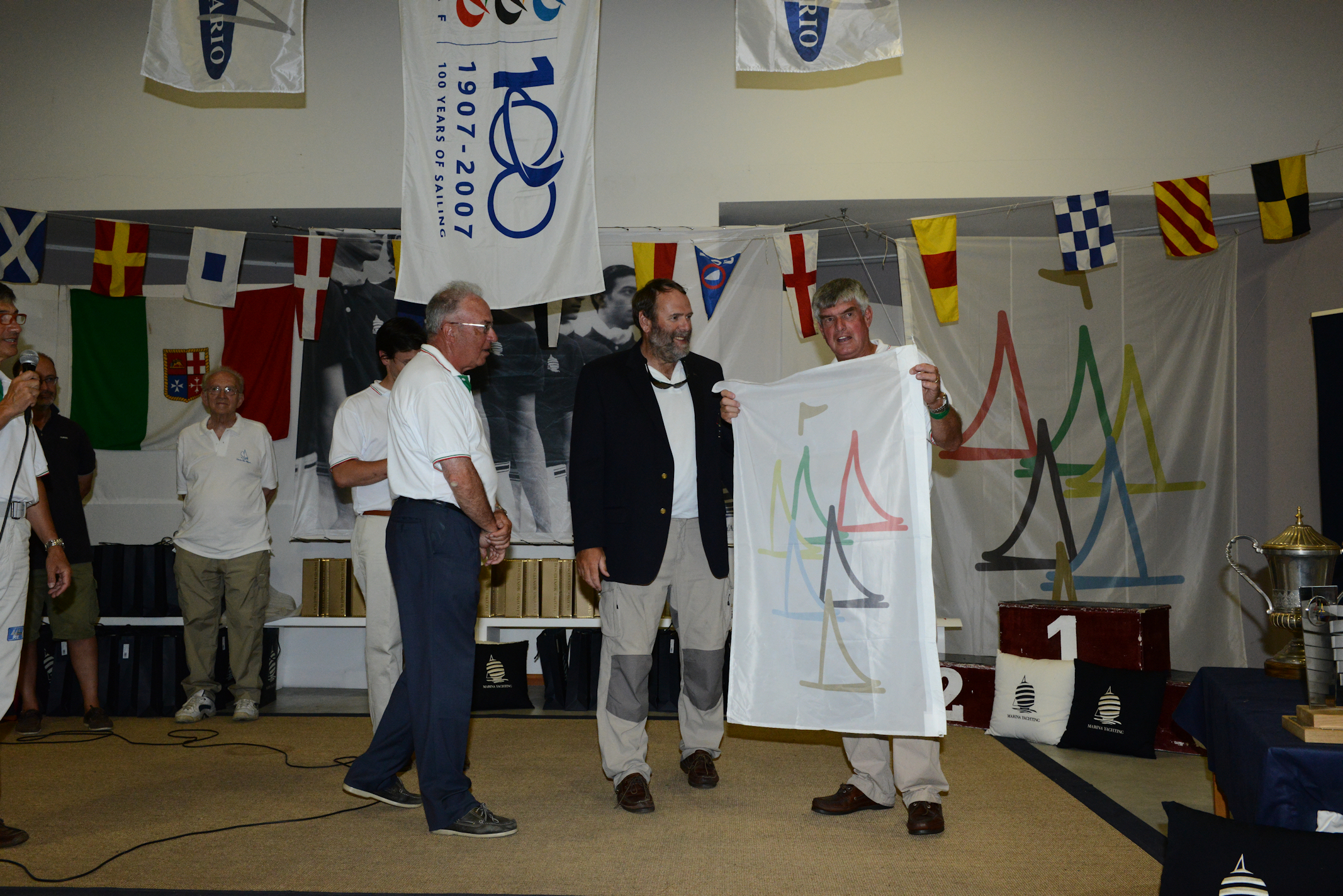
The Vintage Flag was transferred from Carlo Bossi and Pietro Adamoli (Multilario), via Rudy den Outer (Vintage Yachting Games Organization) to John Best representing the Weymouth and Portland National Sailing Academy, the 2016 host.)

=== Media coverage ===
The official photographer of the 2012 Vintage Yachting Games was Silvio Sandonini.

The following footage is available on YouTube:

- From spectator Soling I-12: Soling Leeward mark rounding 5th race
- From spectator Soling I-12: Mark Round 5th race Soling
- From Dragon NED 402: Race 3 aboard Team Bakker^{3}

== Sailing ==
Races in all events were sailed in a fleet racing format of nine scheduled races. The contestants raced around a course in one group, and each boat earned a score equal conform the bonus point system. The five best scores for each boat were summed up for the overall score. Due to wind conditions not all scheduled races could be sailed.

=== Reports per event ===
Per class separate pages reporting the facts are available (see the details section per class in the medals table).

=== Report Vintage InterPares race ===
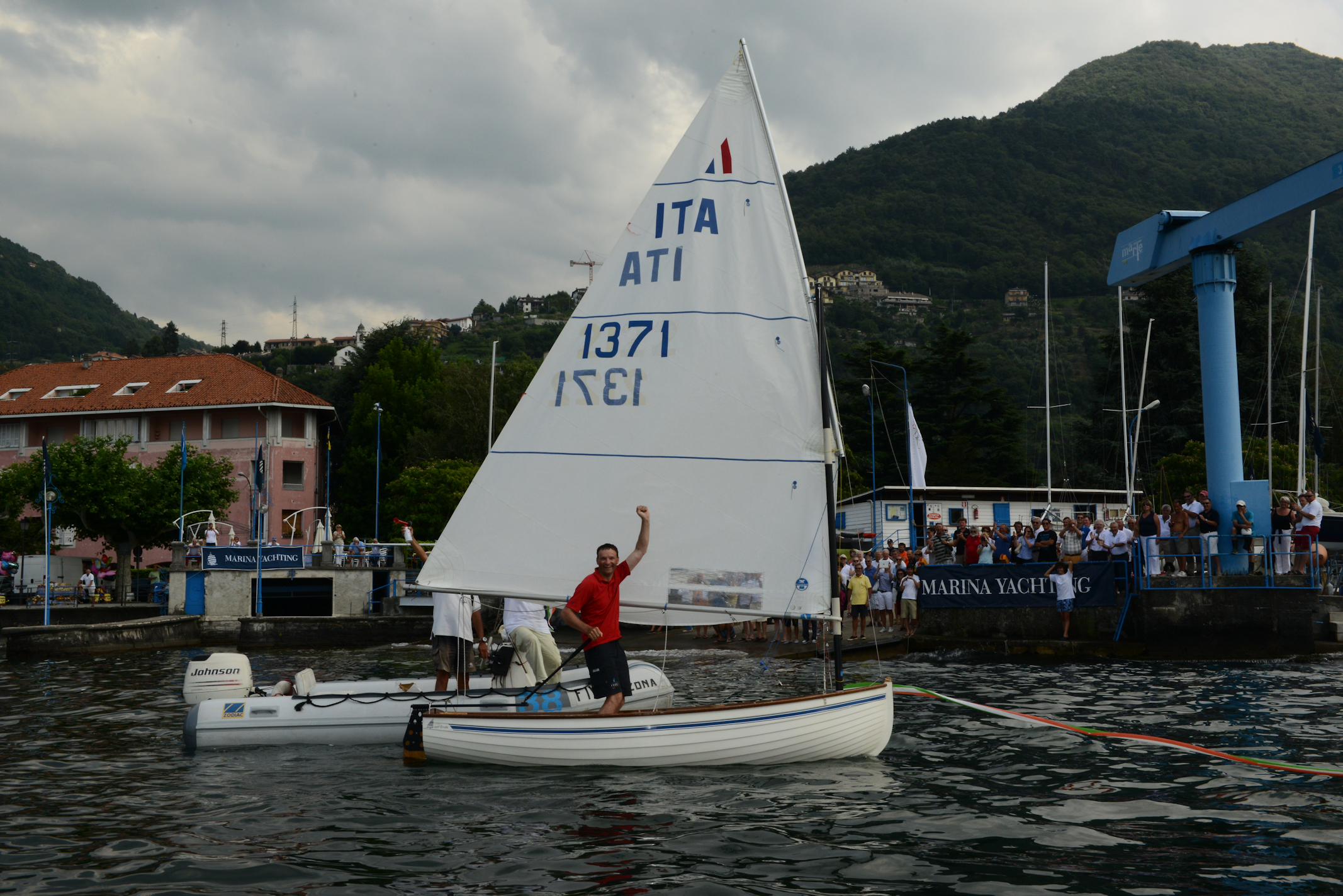
Victor of the Vinatge InterPares Race: Yevhen Braslavets, representing The International Dragon Class

By crossing an Italian colored ribbon Yevhen Braslavets, the responsible person of the victorious Ukrainian Dragon Bunker Prince, won the Vintage InterPares race 2012. In this race all winners of the Vintage Yachting Games meet each other in a battle between the classes. This race is held in the 12' Dinghy, an Olympic class in 1920 and 1928. This class is still very active in 10 countries including The Netherlands, Italy and Japan. For privacy reasons the rest of the finishing order will remain a secret. The International Dragon Class will be "THE" Vintage Yachting Class for the next four years.

== Medal summary ==
=== Medals ===
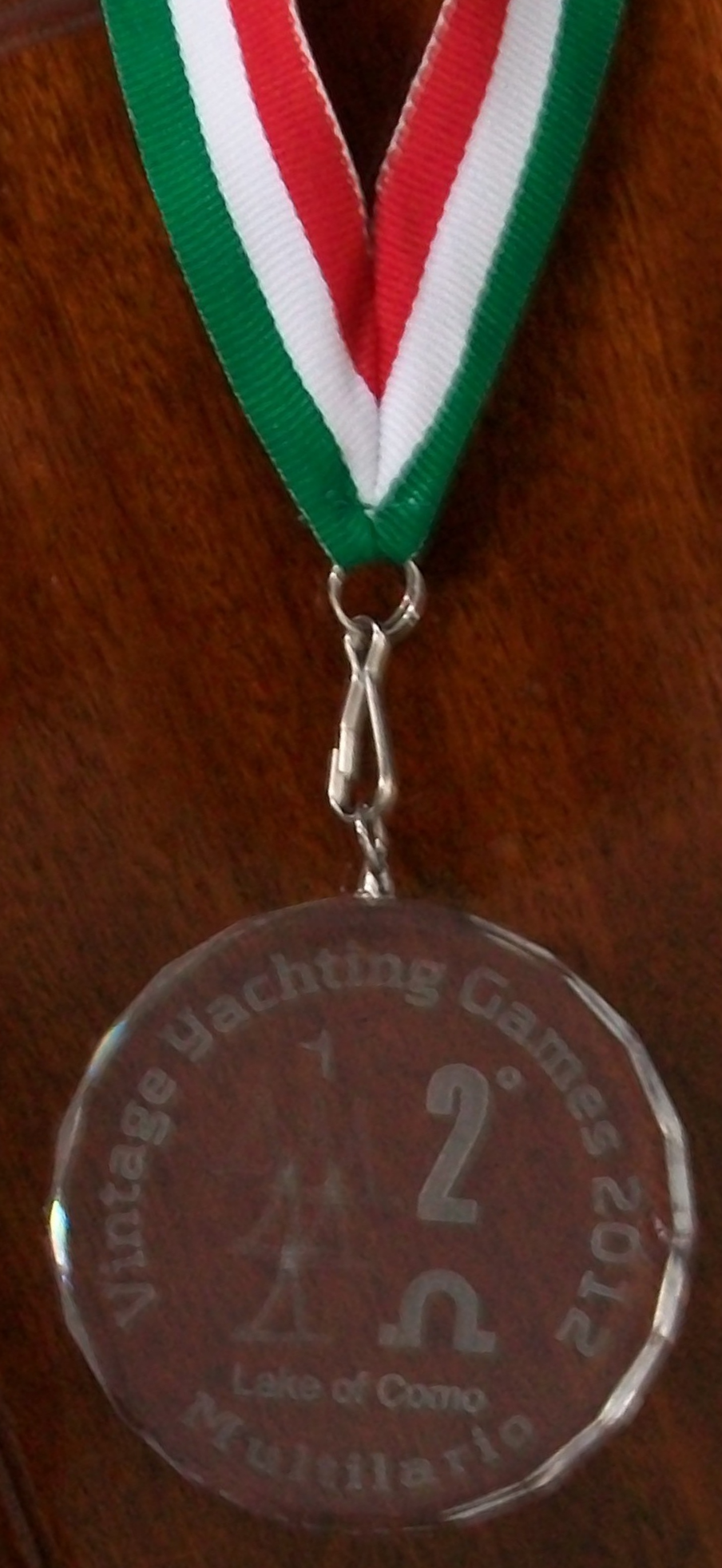
Example of a 2012 Vintage Yachting Games Medal

Event	Gold	Silver	Bronze
Europe Female:	Germany; Janika Puls	Denmark; Anne-Line Lybgsø Thomsen	Denmark; Anna Livbjerg
Europe Male	Denmark; Frederik Rask	Germany; Sverre Reinke	Denmark; Jacob Cholewa
O-Jolle:	Netherlands; Ton op de Weegh	Netherlands; Martin Baas	Netherlands; Thies Bosch
Flying Dutchman:	Austria; Christoph Aichholzer; Philipp Zingerle	Austria; Silvia Aichholzer; Christoph Zingerle	Spain; Ginés Romero Bernabeu; Álvaro Moreno Egea
Tempest:	Switzerland; Cornelia Christen; Ruedi Christen	Germany; Rolf Bähr; Christian Spranger	Germany; Klaus Wende; Max Reichert
Soling:	Ukraine; Igor Yushko; Serhiy Pichuhin; Dmitriy Yarmolenka	Netherlands; Rudy den Outer; Gavin Lidlow; Ramzi Souli	Austria; Peter Neumann); Rudolf Rager; Rudolf Hubauer
Dragon:	Ukraine; Yevhen Braslavets; Georgii Leonchuk; Sergey Timokhov	Netherlands; Reinier Wissenraet; Pim ten Harmsen van der Beek; Marc Reijnhoudt	Russia; Vasiliy Senatorov; Igor Ivashintsov; Alex Muzichenko
5.5 Metre:	Finland; Anders Nordman; Robert Segercrantz; Johan Hjelt	Germany; Herbert 'Biwi' Reich; Wolfgang Oehler; Christian Hemmerich	France; William Borel; Yves Duclos-Grenet; Adrien Baumelle

=== Vintage 2012 ===
Rank	Nation	Gold	Silver	Bronze	Total
1	Ukraine (UKR)	2	0	0	2
2	Germany (GER)	1	3	1	5
2	Netherlands (NED)	1	3	1	5
4	Denmark (DEN)	1	1	2	4
5	Austria (AUT)	1	1	1	3
6	Finland (FIN)	1	0	0	1
6	Switzerland (SUI)	1	0	0	1
8	France (FRA)	0	0	1	1
8	Russia (RUS)	0	0	1	1
8	Spain (ESP)	0	0	1	1
Totals (10 entries)		8	8	8	24

=== Vintage 2008 - 2012 ===
Rank	Nation	Gold	Silver	Bronze	Total
1	Netherlands (NED)	4	4	2	10
2	Germany (GER)	2	4	4	10
3	Ukraine (UKR)	2	0	0	2
4	Denmark (DEN)	1	1	2	4
5	Austria (AUT)	1	1	1	3
6	France (FRA)	1	0	1	2
7	Finland (FIN)	1	0	0	1
7	Hungary (HUN)	1	0	0	1
7	Switzerland (SUI)	1	0	0	1
10	Spain (ESP)	0	1	2	3
11	Great Britain (GBR)	0	1	0	1
11	Italy (ITA)	0	1	0	1
11	Wildcards	0	1	0	1
14	Australia (AUS)	0	0	1	1
14	Russia (RUS)	0	0	1	1
Totals (15 entries)		14	14	14	42

=== Country Trophy ===
Rank	Class (Entries)	Europe (Female) (11)		Europe (Male) (11)		O-Jolle (20)		Flying Dutchman (15)		Tempest (15)		Soling (13)		Dragon (13)		5.5 Metre (15)		Total points
Rank	Country	Rank	Points	Rank	Points	Rank	Points	Rank	Points	Rank	Points	Rank	Points	Rank	Points	Rank	Points	Total points
1	Germany	1	1142	2	841	4	800			2	976	4	578			2	976	5313
2	Netherlands					1	1402					2	914	2	914	7	432	3662
3	Italy	8	239	5	443			6	499	4	675	9	261	10	180	4	675	2962
4	Denmark	2	841	1	1142									5	481			2464
5	Austria							1	1277	10	277	3	738			13	163	2457
6	Switzerland					11	361	9	323	1	1277					6	499	2440
7	Ukraine											1	1215	1	1215			2430
8	France	6	364	11	101					6	499	11	174			3	800	1938
9	Finland															1	1277	1277
10	Russia							11	236					3	738			974
11	United States											5	578	7	370			948
12	Spain							3	800									800
13	Netherlands Antilles							4	675									675
14	Poland			10	142			7	432									574
15	South Africa													8	312			312
16	Hungary													9	226			226
