= Herbert Reich (sailor) =

German sailor (born 1938)

Herbert Reich (born 18 July 1938 in Munich) is a German former sailor who competed in the 1964 Summer Olympics.

Herbert won the silver medal during the 2012 Vintage Yachting Games, this time as helmsman, in the same 5.5 Metre as he competed in during the 1964 Olympics.
