= List of rectors of the University of Wrocław =

This is a list of rectors of the University of Wrocław (Breslau) from 1811.

== Königliche Universität Breslau (1811–1911) ==
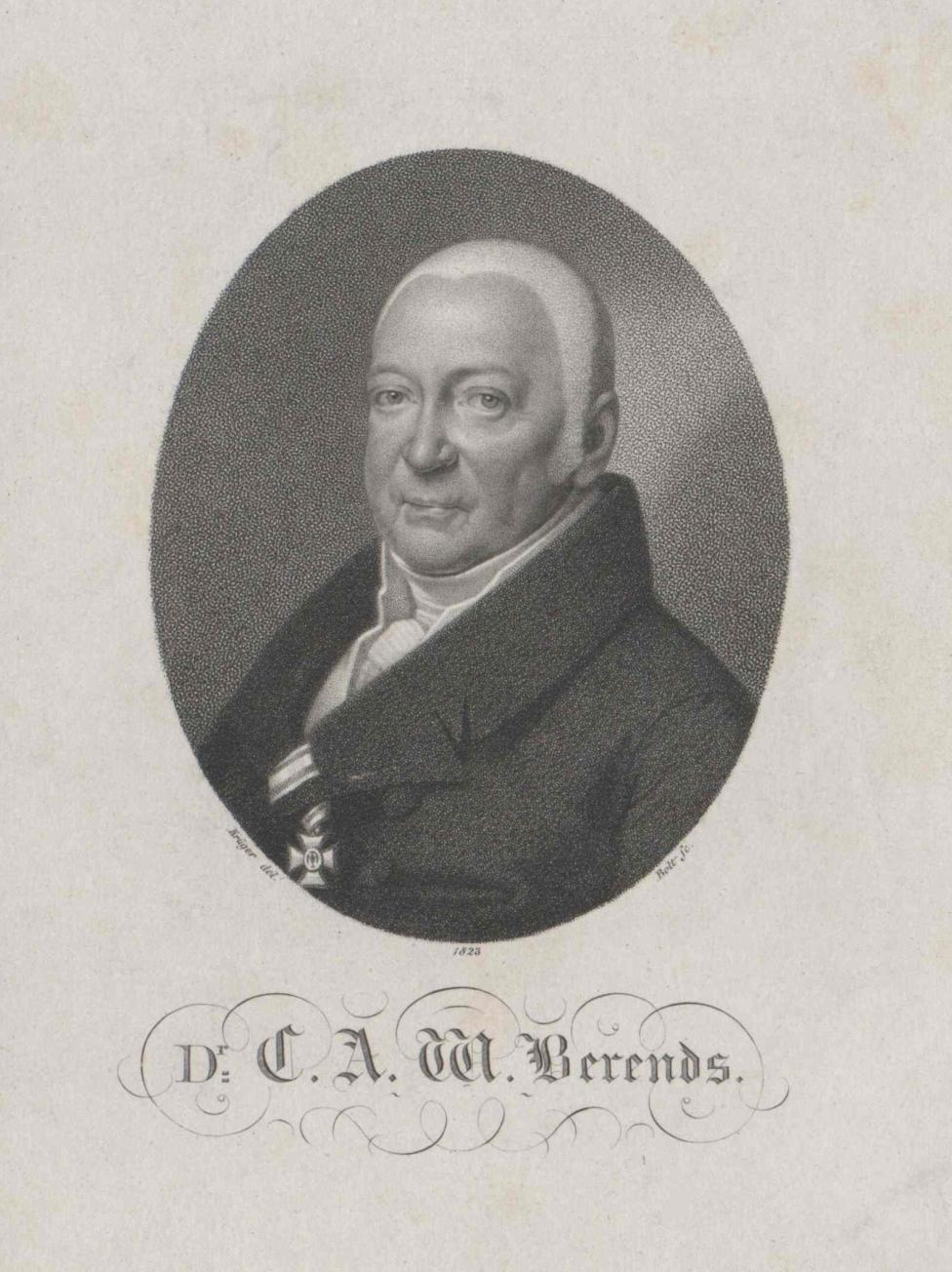
Carl August Wilhelm Berends

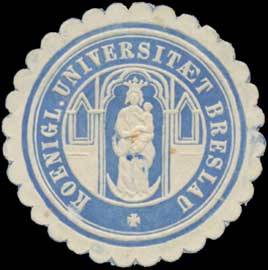
Seal of the K. Universität Breslau

In office		Name
1.	1811-1812	Carl August Wilhelm Berends
2.	1812-1814	Johann Christian Wilhelm Augusti
3.	1814-1815	Heinrich Friedrich Link
4.	1815-1816	Anton Jungnitz
5.	1816-1817	Ernst Daniel August Bartels
6.	1817-1818	Ludwig Gottfried Madihn
7.	1818-1819	Friedrich von Raumer
8.	1819-1820	Thaddäus Anton Dereser
9.	1820-1821	Karl August Dominikus Unterholzner
10.	1821-1822	Henrich Steffens
11.	1822-1823	Hinrich Middeldorpf
12.	1823-1824	Johann Wendt
13.	1824-1825	August Wilhelm Förster
14.	1825-1826	Friedrich Benedict Weber
15.	1826-1827	David Schulz
16.	1827-1828	Ludolph Christian Treviranus
17.	1828-1829	Johann Ludwig Christian Carl Gravenhorst
18.	1829-1830	Henrich Steffens
19.	1830-1831	Ludwig Wachler
20.	1831-1832	Philipp Eduard Huschke
21.	1832-1833	David Schulz
22.	1833-1834	Karl Ernst Christoph Schneider
23.	1834-1835	Karl August Dominikus Unterholzner
24.	1835-1836	Joseph Ignaz Ritter
25.	1836-1837	Georg Heinrich Bernstein
26.	1837-1838	Julius Friedrich Heinrich Abegg
27.	1838-1839	Adolph Wilhelm Otto
28.	1839-1840	August Hahn
29.	1840-1841	Ernst Theodor Gaupp
30.	1841-1842	Peter Joseph Elvenich
31.	1842-1843	Traugott Wilhelm Gustav Benedict
32.	1842-1843	Friedrich von Raumer
33.	1843-1844	Michael Eduard Regenbrecht
34.	1844-1845	Friedrich Pohl
35.	1845-1846	Philipp Eduard Huschke
36.	1846-1847	Heinrich Göppert
37.	1847-1848	Karl Ernst Christoph Schneider
38.	1848-1849	Ernst Eduard Kummer
39.	1849-1850	Joseph Julius Athanasius Ambrosch
40.	1850-1851	Hans Karl Leopold Barkow
41.	1851-1852	Eduard Baltzer
42.	1852-1853	August Wilhelm Henschel
43.	1853-1854	Julius Friedrich Heinrich Abegg
44.	1854-1855	Christlieb Julius Braniss
45.	1855-1856	Julius Wilhelm Betschler
46.	1856-1857	Carl Löwig
47.	1857-1858	Peter Joseph Elvenich
48.	1858-1859	Friedrich Haase
49.	1859-1860	Josef Friedlieb
50.	1860-1861	Christlieb Julius Braniss
52.	1861-1862	Karl Gottlob Semisch
53.	1862-1863	Adolf Friedrich Stenzler
54.	1863-1864	Adolf Eduard Grube
55.	1864-1865	Ferdinand von Roemer
56.	1865-1866	Joseph Hubert Reinkens
57.	1866-1867	August Rossbach
58.	1867-1868	Richard Roepell
59.	1868-1869	Julius Ferdinand Räbiger
60.	1869-1871	Otto Stobbe
61.	1871-1872	Heinrich Haeser
62.	1872-1873	Rudolf Heidenhain
63.	1873-1874	Hermann von Schulze-Gävernitz
64.	1874-1875	Heinrich Eduard Schröter
65.	1875-1876	Johann Gottfried Galle
66.	1876-1877	Martin Hertz
67.	1877-1878	Carl Ludwig von Bar
68.	1878-1879	Otto Spiegelberg
69	1879-1880	Karl Weinhold
70.	1880-1881	Hermann Schwanert
71.	1881-1882	Anton Biermer
72.	1882-1883	Otto von Gierke
73.	1883-1884	Richard Roepell
74.	1884-1885	Richard Förster
75.	1885-1886	Hermann Seuffert
76.	1886-1887	Anton Schneider
77.	1887-1888	Heinrich Fritsch
78.	1888-1889	Theodor Poleck
79.	1889-1890	Ferdinand Probst
80.	1890-1891	Siegfried Brie
81.	1891-1892	Hermann Friedrich Schmidt
82.	1892-1893	Emil Ponfick
83.	1893-1894	Władysław Nehring
84.	1894-1895	Oskar Emil Meyer
85.	1895-1896	Felix Dahn
86.	1896-1897	Rudolf Kittel
87.	1897-1898	Richard Foerster
88.	1898-1899	Artur Koenig
89.	1899-1900	Joseph Partsch
90.	1900-1901	Carl Flügge
91.	1901-1902	Alfred Hillebrandt
92.	1902-1903	Rudolf Leonhard
93.	1903-1904	Jacob Rosanes
94.	1904-1905	Gustav Kawerau
95.	1905-1906	Georg Kaufmann
96.	1906-1907	Max Sdralek
97.	1907-1908	Carl Appel
98.	1908-1909	Wilhelm Uhthoff
99.	1909-1910	Otto Fischer
100.	1910-1911	Alfred Hillebrandt

== Friedrich-Wilhelms-Universität Breslau (1911–1945) ==
In office		Name
101.	1911-1912	Adolf Kneser
102.	1912-1913	Franklin Arnold
103.	1913-1914	Ferdinand Albin Pax
104.	1914-1915	Otto Küstner
105.	1915-1916	Joseph Pohle
106.	1916-1917	Willy Kükenthal
107.	1917-1918	Richard Schott
108.	1918-1919	Max Koch
109.	1919-1920	Richard Pfeiffer
110.	1920-1921	Alfred Gercke
111.	1921-1922	Erich Schaeder
112.	1922-1923	Wilhelm Kroll
113.	1923-1924	Johannes Nikel
114.	1924-1925	Johannes Ziekursch
115.	1925-1926	Alfred Manigk
116.	1926-1927	Ernst Kornemann
117.	1927-1928	Robert Wollenberg
118.	1928-1930	Paul Ehrenberg
119.	1930-1931	Ernst Lohmeyer
120.	1931-1932	Bernhard Poschmann
121.	1932-1933	Carl Brockelmann
122.	1933-1934	Hans Helfritz
123.	1934-1938	Gustav Adolf Walz
124.	1938-1939	Richard Wagner
125.	1939-1943	Martin Staemmler
126.	1943-1945	Heinrich Henkel

== Wrocław University ==
=== Uniwersytet and Politechnika Wrocławska (1945-1952) ===
In office		Name
1.	20.04.1945 - 31.10.1951	prof. dr hab. Stanisław Kulczyński

=== Uniwersytet Wrocławski im. Bolesława Bieruta (1952-1989) ===
In office		Name
2.	1.11.1951 - 30.11.1953	prof. dr hab. Jan Mydlarski
3.	1.12.1953 - 26.10.1957	prof. dr hab. Edward Marczewski
4.	1.11.1957 - 31.08.1959	prof. dr hab. Kazimierz Szarski
5.	1.09.1959 - 31.08.1962	prof. dr hab. Witold Świda
6.	1.09.1962 - 31.08.1968	prof. dr hab. Alfred Jahn
7.	1.09.1968 - 16.11.1971	prof. dr hab. Włodzimierz Berutowicz
8.	1.02.1972 - 31.08.1975	prof. dr hab. Marian Orzechowski
9.	1.09.1975 - 31.08.1981	prof. dr hab. Kazimierz Urbanik
10.	1.09.1981 - 16.08.1982	prof. Józef Łukaszewicz
11.	16.08.1982 - 31.08.1984	prof. dr hab. Henryk Ratajczak
12.	1.09.1984 - 31.08.1987	prof. dr hab. Jan Mozrzymas
13.	1.09.1987 - 31.08.1990	prof. Mieczysław Klimowicz

=== Uniwersytet Wrocławski (since 1989) ===
In office		Name
14.	1.09.1990 - 14.02.1995	prof. dr hab. Wojciech Wrzesiński
15.	7.02.1995 - 31.08.1999	prof. dr hab. Roman Duda
16.	1.09.1999 - 31.08.2002	prof. dr hab. Romuald Gelles
17.	1.09.2002 - 31.08.2005	prof. dr hab. Zdzisław Latajka
18.	1.09.2005 - 31.08.2008	prof. dr hab. Leszek Pacholski
19.	1.09.2008 - 31.08.2016	prof. dr hab. Marek Bojarski
20.	1.09.2016 - 31.08.2020	prof. dr hab. Adam Jezierski
21.	1.09.2020 - 31.08.2024	prof. dr hab. Przemysław Wiszewski

== Sources ==
- Wojciech Wrzesiński, Uniwersytet Wrocławski 1945-1995, Leopoldinum, Wrocław 1995.
- Teresa Kulak, Mieczysław Pater, Wojciech Wrzesiński, Historia Uniwersytetu Wrocławskiego 1702-2002, Wrocław 2002.
