= Gerke =

Gerke and Gercke are German surnames. Notable people with these surnames include:

== People named Gerke ==
- Florence Holmes Gerke (1896–1964), American landscape architect and newspaper editor
- Friedrich Clemens Gerke (1801–1888), German writer, journalist, musician and pioneer of telegraph
- Jack Gerke (1916–2005), Australian Second World War and Korean War veteran
- Sabine Gerke (born 1971), German tennis player

== People named Gercke ==
- Achim Gercke (1902–1997), German politician
- Alfred Gercke (1860–1922), German classical philologist
- Daniel James Gercke (1874–1964), American Roman Catholic bishop
- Doris Gercke (1937–2025), German writer
- Lena Gercke (born 1988), German fashion model and television host

== See also ==
- Susan Oliver (born Charlotte Gercke, 1932–1990), American actress, television director, aviator, and author
- Friedrich Clemens Gerke Tower, a telecommunication tower in Cuxhaven, Germany
