= O-Jolle =

1930s Olympic sailing design

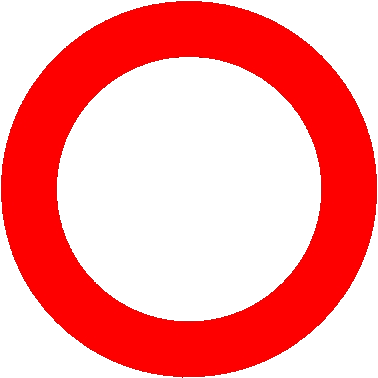
- Class symbol

Development
- Designer: Hellmut Wilhelm E. Stauch
- Location: Germany
- Year: 1933
- Design: One-Design
- Role: Designed for the Olympic Games 1936
- Name: O-Jolle

Boat
- Crew: 1
- Draft: 0.15 m (6 in); 1.1 m (3 ft 7 in)

Hull
- Type: Dinghy
- Construction: Carvel; GRP; Cold moulded plywood Composite
- Hull weight: 220 kg (490 lb)
- LOA: 5 m (16 ft)
- Beam: 1.66 m (5 ft 5 in)

Hull appendages
- Keel: Centerboard

Rig
- Rig type: Bermuda rig
- Mast height: 6.8 m (22 ft)

Sails
- Mainsail area: 11.5 m^{2} (124 sq ft)

Racing
- RYA PN: 114

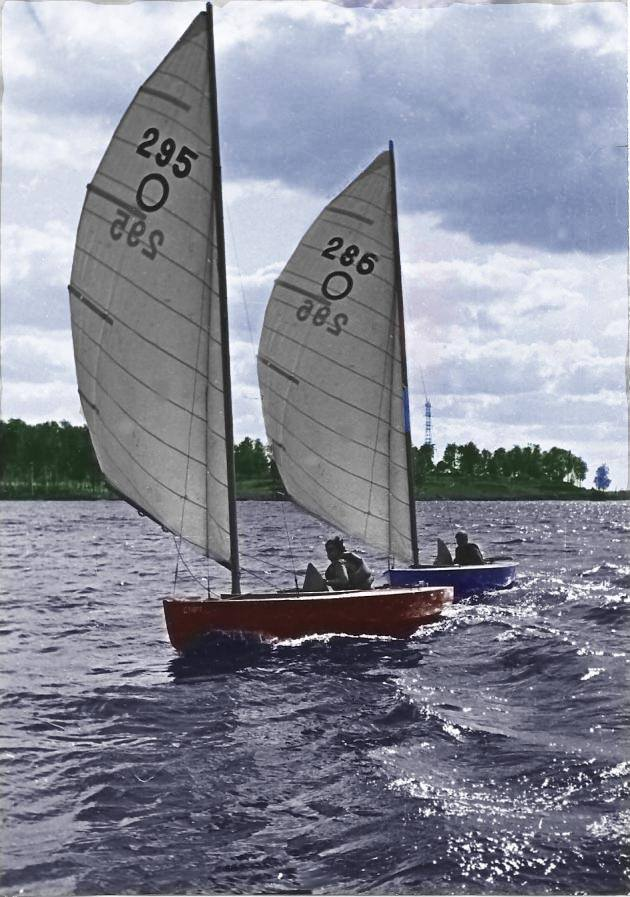
O-Jolle former Olympic dinghy on Klyazminskoye reservoir near Moscow

The O-Jolle – (Olympiajolle, [oˈlʏm.pja.jɔl.ə], "Olympic dinghy") – was created as the Monotype class for the 1936 Olympic Games by designer Hellmut Wilhelm E. Stauch (GER, later RSA). The boat is a Bermuda rig and the hull was originally carvel - later GRP and cold moulded plywood construction were allowed. The O-Jolle has very good sailing capabilities and can cater for a wide spectrum of sailors from young to old and from light to heavyweight.

In 1936 Daan Kagchelland took the Gold medal in the Olympic regatta in Kiel.

The O-Jolle is still one of the largest dinghy classes in Germany and the Netherlands - the International Olympiajollen Union has over 500 members. The O-Jolle is still raced in Germany, the Netherlands, Austria, Italy and Switzerland. There are also minor fleets in Poland, Brazil, Serbia and other countries.

Since 2008 the O-Jolle has been one of the Vintage Yachting Classes during the Vintage Yachting Games.

== Wall of Fame ==
=== Olympic Games ===
Rank	Nation	Gold	Silver	Bronze	Total
1	Netherlands	1	0	0	1
2	Germany	0	1	0	1
3	Great Britain	0	0	1	1
Totals (3 entries)		1	1	1	3

Year	Gold	Silver	Bronze
1936 Berlin	Netherlands (NED); Daan Kagchelland	Germany (GER); Werner Krogmann	Great Britain (GBR); Peter Scott

=== Vintage Yachting Games ===
Rank	Nation	Gold	Silver	Bronze	Total
1	Netherlands (NED)	3	3	3	9
Totals (1 entries)		3	3	3	9

Event	Gold	Silver	Bronze
2008 (Netherlands); Medemblik	Netherlands (NED); Max Blom	Netherlands (NED); Herman van Eijk	Netherlands (NED); Jan Krom
2012 (Italy); Lake Como	Netherlands (NED); Ton op de Weegh	Netherlands (NED); Martin Baas	Netherlands (NED); Thies Bosch
2018 (Denmark); Hellerup	Netherlands (NED); Thies Bosch	Netherlands (NED); Klaas de Boer	Netherlands (NED); Onno Klazinga

=== European Championships ===
Rank	Nation	Gold	Silver	Bronze	Total
1	Germany (GER)	38	7	7	52
2	Netherlands (NED)	13	4	5	22
3	Austria (AUT)	3	0	0	3
4	Switzerland (SUI)	2	1	0	3
5	Belgium (BEL)	1	0	0	1
Totals (5 entries)		57	12	12	81

Event	Gold	Silver	Bronze
1937	Germany (G); Ernst Bickel		
1938	Germany (G); Ernst Bickel		
1939	Netherlands (H); A.F. Veen		
1950	Austria (OE); Harald Musil		
1951	Austria (OE); Dr. Wolfgang Erndl		
1954	Belgium (B); André Nelis		
1955	Austria (OE); Dr. Wolfgang Erndl		
1963	Germany (G); Hans Deuss		
1964	Germany (G); Uwe Woite		
1965	Germany (G); Uwe Woite		
1966	Germany (G); Uwe Woite		
1967	Not sailed		
1968	Germany (G); Uwe Woite		
1969	Germany (G); Uwe Woite		
1970	Germany (G); Klaus Schenkel		
1971	Germany (G); Uwe Woite		
1972	Germany (G); Uwe Woite		
1973	Switzerland (Z); Hans Eisold		
1974	Germany (G); Horst Klein		
1975	Germany (G); Klaus Pommeränig		
1976	Netherlands (H); Fre Mik		
1977	Switzerland (Z); Herman Krebs		
1978	Germany (G); Ulrich Kosfeld		
1979	Netherlands (H); Fre Mik		
1980	Germany (G); Walter Arndt		
1981	Germany (G); Ulrich Kosfeld		
1982	Germany (G); Detlef Pfenner		
1983	Germany (G); Volker Niederhausen		
1984	Germany (G); Klaus Stadler		
1985	Germany (G); Roland Franzmann		
1986	Netherlands (H); Dolf Peet		
1987	Germany (G); Volker Niederhausen		
1988	Germany (G); Horst Jentsch		
1989	Germany (G); Roland Franzmann		
1990	Germany (G); Knut Wahrendorf		
1991	Germany (G); Uwe Peschlow		
1992	Germany (GER); Knut Wahrendorf		
1993	Germany (GER); Knut Wahrendorf		
1994	Germany (GER); Knut Wahrendorf		
1995	Germany (GER); Olaf Wahrendorf		
1996	Netherlands (NED); Peter Peet		
1997	Netherlands (NED); Peter Peet		
1998	Netherlands (NED); Peter Peet		
1999	Netherlands (NED); Fred Moerman		
2000	Germany (GER); Knut Wahrendorf		
2001	Netherlands (NED); Fred Moerman		
2002 Dümmersee	Netherlands (NED); Herman van Eijk	Netherlands (NED); Jan ten Hoeve	Netherlands (NED); Ward Boersma
2003 Altmünster	Netherlands (NED); Mels Jongeneel	Germany (GER); Knut Wahrendorf	Netherlands (NED); Henri Boere
2004 Tjeukemeer	Netherlands (NED); Jan ten Hoeve	Germany (GER); Wolfgang Höfener	Netherlands (NED); Stefan de Vries
2005 Grandson	Germany (GER); Göran Freise	Switzerland (SUI); Francois Eggenberger	Germany (GER); Jörg BELS
2006 Brenzone	Germany (GER); Wolfgang Höfener	Netherlands (NED); Kees Jongeneel	Netherlands (NED); Jan ten Hoeve
2007 Wolfgangsee	Germany (GER); Donald Lippert	Germany (GER); Frank Lietzmann	Germany (GER); Axel Forstmann
2008 Plön	Germany (GER); Donald Lippert	Germany (GER); Frank Lietzmann	Germany (GER); Axel Forstmann
2009 Silvaplana	Germany (GER); Frank Lietzmann	Germany (GER); Martin Hofmann	Germany (GER); Knut Wahrendorf
2010 Bellano	Netherlands (NED); Ton Op de Weegh	Netherlands (NED); Mels Jongeneel	Germany (GER); Frank Lietzmann
2011 Flensburg	Germany (GER); Wolfgang Höfener	Netherlands (NED); Stefan de Vries	Netherlands (NED); Ton Op de Weegh
2012 Altmünster	Germany (GER); Peter Lippert	Germany (GER); Göran Freise	Germany (GER); Knut Wahrendorf
2013 Attersee	Germany (GER); Donald Lippert	Germany (GER); Frank Lietzmann	Germany (GER); Göran Freise

=== National Champions ===
	Austria	Germany	German Democratic Republic	Italy	Netherlands	Switzerland
1938					Daan Kagchelland	
1939					Not sailed	
1940					Jan Bier	
1941					Hein Recourt	
1942					Koos de Jong	
1943		Dahme Jacht Club Berlin			Koos de Jong	
1944					Not sailed	
1945					Not sailed	
1946					Koos de Jong	
1947					Koos de Jong	
1948					Koos de Jong	
1949					Bob Markus	
1950		G. Burghardt	W. Pohl		Bob Markus	
1951		G. Burghardt	H. Mahnke		Not sailed	
1952		O. Erhardt	E. Gollnick		Koos de Jong	
1953		E. Soltau	J. Vogler		Koos de Jong	
1954		W. Krogmann	Klaus Schröter		Bob Markus	
1955		J. Vogler	J. Vogler		Jaap Stap	
1956		E. Soltau	P. Schönfeld		Jaap Stap	
1957		E. Soltau	Not sailed		Hans Willems	
1958		H. Illies	W. Nagora		Jaap Stap	
1959		D. Bauer	Karlheinz Schröter		Sjirk Haaksma	
1960		Uwe Woite	H. Hermann		Bert Tournier	
1961		W. Werner	Karlheinz Schröter		Nico Keijzer	
1962		K. Möller	Karlheinz Schröter		Cas Visser	
1963		W. Juran	W. Bretschneider		Bert Benschop	
1964		Dieter Faaß	Karlheinz Schröter		Koert Jansen	
1965		Uwe Woite	Klaus Schröter		Cas Visser	
1966		Uwe Woite	Klaus Schröter		Jan Krom	
1967		S. Uecker	W. Bretschneider		Cees van Tongeren	
1968		Uwe Woite	Karlheinz Schröter		Cees van Tongeren	
1969		Uwe Woite	Karlheinz Schröter		Thees Scheen	
1970		M. Baum	Klaus Schröter		Jan Woldhuis	
1971		Uwe Woite	Manfred Schrot		Cees van Tongeren	
1972		Klaus Pommeränig	Karlheinz Schröter		Peter van Wamel	
1973		Klaus Pommeränig	Karlheinz Schröter		Germany; Walter Pranger	
1974		Karl-Heinz Berke	Karlheinz Schröter		Peter van Wamel	
1975		Klaus Pommeränig	Knut Wahrendorf		Peter van Wamel	
1976		Ulrich Kosfeld	Knut Wahrendorf		Nico Hofkamp	
1977		Ulrich Kosfeld	Wilfried Lippert		Fre Mik	
1978		Detlef Pfenner	Knut Wahrendorf		Thees Scheen	
1979		Ulrich Kosfeld	Jochen Urban		Fre Mik	
1980		Ulrich Kosfeld	Peter Lippert		Nico Hofkamp	
1981		Frank Hübner	Knut Wahrendorf		Germany; Frank Hübner	
1982		Frank Hübner	Wilfried Lippert		Germany; Frank Hübner	
1983		Walter Pranger	Hans Thurner		Rinus Kagchelland	
1984		Roland Franzmann	Knut Wahrendorf		Bram van der Veen	
1985		Roland Franzmann	Knut Wahrendorf		Germany; Walter Pranger	
1986		Roland Franzmann	Knut Wahrendorf		Dolf Peet	
1987		Wolfgang Krebs	Peter Lippert		Germany; Wolfgang Kreb	
1988		Roland Franzmann	Peter Lippert		Germany; Horst Jensch	
1989		Roland Franzmann	Wilfried Lippert		Germany; Uwe Peschlow	
1990		Wilfried Lippert			Germany; Wolfgang Höfener	
1991		Uwe Peschlow			Germany; Karol Jabłoński	
1992		Knut Wahrendorf			Germany; Wolfgang Höfener	
1993		Uwe Peschlow			Germany; Knut Wahrendorf	
1994		Uwe Peschlow			Germany; Knut Wahrendorf	
1995		Olaf Wahrendorf			Peter Peet	
1996		Olaf Wahrendorf			Peter Peet	
1997		Wolfgang Kirchner			Germany; Wolfgang Höfener	
1998		Knut Wahrendorf			Peter Peet	
1999		Knut Wahrendorf			Germany; Knut Wahrendorf	
2000		Knut Wahrendorf			Martin Baas	
2001		Knut Wahrendorf			Herman van Eijk	
2002		Knut Wahrendorf			Jan ten Hoeve	
2003		Donald Lippert			Mels Jongeneels	
2004		Wolfgang Höfener			Fred Moerman	
2005		Wolfgang Höfener			Mark Neeleman	
2006		Knut Wahrendorf			Mels Jongeneels	
2007		Netherlands; Stefan de Vries			Germany; Wolfgang Höfener	
2008	Germany; Frank Lietzmann	Netherlands; Stefan de Vries			Germany; Wolfgang Höfener	
2009	Germany; Axel Forstmann				Stefan de Vries	
2010		Netherlands; Stefan de Vries			Martin Baas	
2011	GermanyKnut Wahrendorf	Göran Freise			Jan Willem van den Hondel	
	Austria	Germany	German Democratic Republic	Italy	Netherlands	Switzerland
