= Albert Van Den Abeele =

Belgian sailor

Personal information
- Full name: Albert Silvain Jules Van Den Abeele
- Born: 18 March 1907 Ghent, Belgium
- Died: 24 July 1994

Sailing career
- Sport: Sailing
- College team: 1936 Olympic Monotype (O-Jolle)
- Club: Royal Belgian Sailing Club

Albert Silvain Jules Van Den Abeele (born 18 March 1907, date of death unknown) was a Belgian sailor. He competed in the O-Jolle event at the 1936 Summer Olympics.
