= Sailing at the 1936 Summer Olympics – O-Jolle =

Sailing at the Olympics

O-Jolle at the Games of the XI Olympiad
- Gold and Bronze medalists
- Venue: Firth of Kiel
- Dates: August 4–12
- Competitors: 28 from 25 nations
- Teams: 25

Medalists
1st place, gold medalist(s)		Daan Kagchelland	Netherlands
2nd place, silver medalist(s)		Werner Krogmann	Germany
3rd place, bronze medalist(s)		Peter Scott	Great Britain

The O-Jolle was a sailing event at the 1936 Summer Olympics in Firth of Kiel. Seven races were scheduled. 28 sailors on 25 boats from 25 nations competed.

== Results ==
Rank	Helmsman (Country)	Sailnumber	Yachtname	Race I		Race II		Race III		Race IV		Race V		Race VI		Race VII		Total Points
Rank	Helmsman (Country)	Sailnumber	Yachtname	Rank	Points	Rank	Points	Rank	Points	Rank	Points	Rank	Points	Rank	Points	Rank	Points	Total Points
1st place, gold medalist(s)	Daan Kagchelland (NED)	324	Nürnberg	4	22	1	25	1	25	6	20	2	24	1	25	4	22	163
2nd place, silver medalist(s)	Werner Krogmann (GER)	326	Rostock	2	24	4	22	3	23	9	17	1	25	6	20	7	19	150
3rd place, bronze medalist(s)	Peter Scott (GBR)	325	Potsdam	1	25	2	24	2	24	7	19	3	23	10	16	DNF	0	131
4	Erich Wichmann-Harbeck (CHI)	322	Mainz	3	23	8	18	4	22	23	3	6	20	7	19	1	25	130
5	Giuseppe Fago (ITA)	302	Augsburg	14	12	5	21	DNF	0	4	22	7	19	3	23	8	18	115
6	Jacques Lebrun (FRA)	319	Leipzig	7	19	13	13	5	21	18	8	12	14	15	11	3	23	109
7	Tibor Heinrich von Omorovicza (HUN)	317	Königsberg	12	14	DNF	0	9	17	16	10	8	18	4	22	5	21	102
8	Willy Pieper (SUI)	316	Köln	13	13	19	7	13	13	8	18	14	12	5	21	11	15	99
9	Frank Jewett (USA)	301	Angerburg	17	9	10	16	6	20	15	11	18	8	13	13	6	20	97
10	Thor Thorvaldsen (NOR)	312	Hamburg	16	10	DSQ	0	17	9	1	25	9	17	2	24	18	8	93
11	Rene Israel Nyman (FIN)	305	Bremen	9	17	DNF	0	14	12	5	21	11	15	11	15	13	13	93
12	Sigurd Christensen (DEN)	315	Kiel	5	21	7	19	DSQ	0	20	6	10	16	8	18	14	12	92
13	Charles Eriksson and Anton Ström (SWE)	310	Düsseldorf	6	20	9	17	15	11	11	15	4	22	DSQ	0	19	7	92
14	Eugenio Lauz (URU)	314	Heidelberg	15	11	16	10	12	14	2	24	15	11	21	5	10	16	91
15	Dietz Angerer (AUT)	306	Breslau	8	18	17	9	DSQ	0	12	14	5	21	DSQ	0	2	24	86
16	Reg Dixon (CAN)	309	Dresden	11	15	14	12	11	15	3	23	24	2	19	7	16	10	84
17	Erik Johannes Holst (EST)	304	Brandenburg	DNF	0	6	20	7	19	21	5	13	13	9	17	22	4	78
18	Leon Jensz and Jerzy Dzięcioł (POL)	321	Magdeburg	18	8	3	23	18	8	13	13	19	7	20	6	20	6	71
19	Karlo Bauman (YUG)	318	Konstanz	19	7	15	11	8	18	DNF	0	16	10	16	10	17	9	65
20	Demir Turgut (TUR)	307	Cuxhaven	20	6	DNF	0	19	7	10	16	23	3	12	14	9	17	63
21	Ernest Vieira de Mendonça (POR)	313	Hannover	10	16	20	6	10	16	19	7	20	6	DNF	0	15	11	62
22	Norio Fujimura (JPN)	311	Essen	22	4	11	15	16	10	22	4	21	5	14	12	21	5	55
23	Albert van den Abeele (BEL)	308	Danzig	DNF	0	18	8	20	6	17	9	17	9	18	8	12	14	54
24	Walter Heuer (BRA)	320	Lübeck	21	5	21	5	22	4	14	12	25	1	17	9	23	3	39
25	Vítězslav Pavlousek and Miloslav Brepta (TCH)	323	München	DSQ	0	12	14	21	5	24	2	22	4	22	4	24	2	31

DNF = Did Not Finish, DSQ = Disqualified
= Male, = Female

=== Daily standings ===
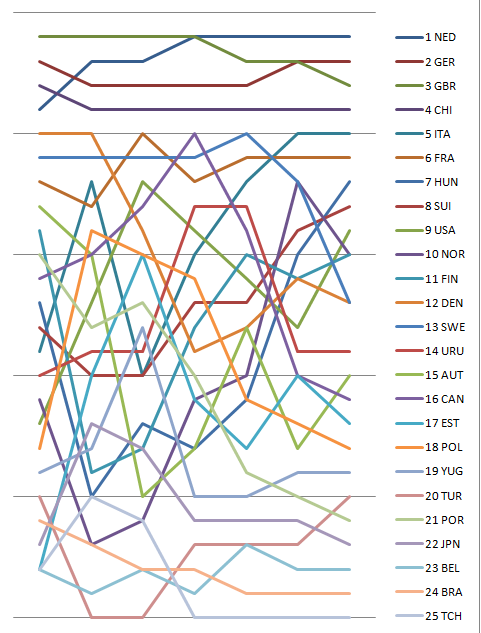
Graph showing the daily standings in the O-Jolle during the 1936 Summer Olympics

== Conditions at the Inner Course ==
All starts were scheduled for 10:30.

Inner Course area at Kiel

Date	Race	Sky	Sea	Wind direction	Wind speed (m/s)	Actual starting time	Remark
04-AUG-1936	I	Overcast, Occasional rain	Heavy	SW	8-12	12:05	Postponement due to heavy sea
05-AUG-1936	II	Sunshine, Later overcast and rain		WSW	3	10:30	
06-AUG-1936	III	Sunny		WSW	4-5	10:50	Postponement due to calm
07-AUG-1936	IV	Slightly overcast		NE	1-2	10:50	Postponement due to calm
08-AUG-1936	V	Foggy later slightly overcast		ENE	2-3	10:30	
09-AUG-1936	VI	Calm		NEN	2	10:50	Postponement due to calm
10-AUG-1936	VII	Fine		SE	2-3	10:30	
