= Klio (journal) =

- Discipline: Classics
- Language: English
- Edited by: Christian Mann

Publication details
- Former name(s): Beiträge zur alten Geschichte
- History: 1901–present
- Publisher: Walter de Gruyter
- Frequency: Biannually

Standard abbreviations
- ISO 4: Klio

Indexing
- ISSN: 2192-7669

Links
- Journal homepage

Klio: Beiträge zur alten Geschichte is a biannual peer-reviewed academic journal covering ancient history, focussing on the history of Ancient Greece and Rome from the archaic period to Late Antiquity, as well as relationships with the Ancient Near East. Areas covered also include epigraphy, papyrology, archaeology and numismatics. The journal is published by Walter de Gruyter and articles are in English, French, German, Italian, or Spanish.

== History ==
The journal was established in 1901 as Beiträge zur alten Geschichte (English: Contributions to Ancient History). Since the 6th issue, it has been named Klio, after Clio, the muse of historiography. The first editor-in-chief was Carl F. Lehmann; in 1903 he was joined by Ernst Kornemann. The journal was published by Leipziger Dieterich-Verlag until 1944. After a first continuously numbered series of the journal from 1901 to 1923, a "New Series" was begun in 1925, which restarted at number one and came to an end with number 18 in 1944. In 1959, the first volume of a renewed series was published by Akademie Verlag (East Germany) as number 37 (as if the two previous series had been continuously numbered), although the journal Historia had been founded in 1950 in West Germany as a replacement. A third "major" journal, Chiron appeared from 1971. However, the importance of the pre-war series ensured that the full set was reprinted at the beginning of the 1960s, although not in the same format or at the same quality as the original publication.

Until 1992, Klio was edited by the government-controlled Zentralinstitut für Alte Geschichte und Archäologie. However, it also published works of Western historians and sometimes included Russian language contributions. Important articles appeared in Klio even after 1959, but the publications of East German scholars at this time were not always up to date or at the level of international research, as a result of the shortage of money and the enforcement of the state's ideological views.

In 1993 the journal received a new editorial board. The current editors are Manfred Clauss (Frankfurt am Main), Hans-Joachim Gehrke (Freiburg/Berlin), Peter Funke (Münster) and Christian Mann (Mannheim).

From 1903 until 1944 and again since 1999 (in a Neuen Folge - new series) the journal has published Klio-Beihefte (Klio Supplements), consisting of monographs, mostly published doctoral theses.

== Editors ==
The following persons have been editors-in-chief:

- Carl F. Lehmann-Haupt (co-founder and first editor)
- Ernst Kornemann (1903-1927)
- Gert Audring (1988-1991)
- Hans-Joachim Gehrke (since 1993)
- Manfred Clauss (since 1993)
- Peter Funke (since 2011)
- Christian Mann (since 2018)

== Abstracting and indexing ==
The journal is abstracted and indexed in Scopus.
