= Devasvāmin =

Deva-svāmin (c. 11th century) was a Sanskrit writer from present-day India. He is known for an authoritative commentary (bhashya) on the Ashvalayana-grihya-sutra, a Rigveda-affiliated text that details rituals and rites.

== Date ==
Deva-svāmin definitely lived before the 12th century, as he has been quoted by Gargya Narayana (fl. c. 1100 CE). His commentary on the Ashvalayana-grihya-sutra cites Medhātithi, whose earliest date is no later than the second half of the 9th century. Scholar P. V. Kane dates him to 1000-1050 CE or earlier, noting that he shares same views as the contemporary scholar Bhoja (r. c. 1010-1055 CE). Some earlier scholars, such as Alfred Hillebrandt, placed him in the 5th century, but this theory is no longer tenable.

Other than Medhātithi, Deva-svāmin does not mention any earlier author by name, although he quotes several other works, including one by his teacher.

== Place ==
Several later works cite Deva-svāmin; these include:

- A commentary on the Ashvalayana-grhya-sutra by Gargya Narayana (c. 1100)
- A commentary on the Ashvalayana-grhya-sutra by Naidhruva Narayana (date uncertain)
- Smriti-chandrika by Devanna-bhatta (c. 1200)
- Chatur-varga-chinta-mani by Hemadri (c. 1260)
- Parashara-madhaviya by Madhava (14th century)
- Yajna-tantra-shudha-nidhi by Sayana (died 1387)
- Gotra-pravara-manjari by Purushottama (before 1450)
- Sarasvati-vilasa (c. 1500), composed under the patronage of Prataparudra Deva
- Chatur-vimshati-mata-vyakhya by Bhattoji Dikshita (1575–1650)
- Dattaka-mimamsaand Keshava-vijayanti by Nanda-pandita (1580–1630)
- Prayoga-dipika or Prayoga-vrtti by Talavrntanivasin alias Andapillai
- Viramitrodaya by Mitra-mishra (c. 1600)
- Shraddha-mayukha by Nilakantha (c. 1610–1645)
- Chatur-masya-prayoga by Ananta-deva (c. 1645–1675)
- Ashvalayana-sutra-prayoga-vritti by Vishnu-bhatta (date uncertain)
- Soma-prayoga by Rudra-deva (date uncertain)

Most of these writers, especially the ones who quote him frequently, are from South India. Most of the manuscripts of his works have also been found there. Therefore, it is likely that Deva-svāmin was from South India. However, this is not certain, as he refers to several places in North India. For example, while commenting on the Ashvalayana Grhya Sutra 1.14.6, which instructs the performer to recite the name of a river in their neighbourhood, he names Yamuna as an example. While commenting on the sutra 1.7.1, he mentions variation in local customs of different regions, all of them in North India - Anga, Vanga, Magadha, Kuru, Videha, Panchala, and Surasena. That said, he also mentions the Pandya country in South India while commenting on the sutra 1.7.2: he states that the newly married couples in the Pandya territory consummate their marriage immediately after the wedding ceremony, which is not in accordance with the sutra's instruction.

== Works ==
The following texts are attributed to Deva-svāmin:

- Agni-stoma-paddhati, Agni-stoma--prayoga, or Agni-stoma-vidhi
- A digest of Smriti texts, as attested by the 13th century text Smriti-chandrika.
- A bhashya (commentary) on the Ashvalayana-grihya-sutra. Two later commentators on the same text - Narayana of Naidhruva gotra and Gargya Narayana - state that they follow Deva-svāmin's bhashya.
  - This commentary exists in two recensions; the southern recension was edited by K. P. Aithal (1980).
- A bhashya on the Ashvalayana-shrauta-sutra
- A bhashya on the Baudhayana-shrauta-sutra
- A bhashya on the Mimamsa-sutra of Jaimini
- A bhashya on the Samskara-kanda
- A gloss on 12 chapters of the Purva Mimamsa Sutra; this is attested by the Prapancha-Hridaya, which states that Deva-svāmin wrote this brief gloss because the bhashyas of Baudhayana and Upavarsha were too long. The same text states that Deva-svāmin also wrote a gloss on 4 chapters of the Samskara-kanda.

Presumably the 11th century commentator Deva-svāmin is same as the Deva-svāmin who wrote several works on dharma-shastra (Hindu law). However, he should not to be confused with an earlier astrologer quoted by Varahamihira and Utpala. He may or may not be same as the following Sanskrit writers named Deva-svāmin, known from several manuscripts:

- Author of Svarankusha
- Author of Bhakti-kalpa-taru
- A person referred to in Ramanuja's Vyakhya-pradipa or Mahabharata-samkshepa-tika and Mahadeva's Ashvineya-stuti-vyakriti, commentaries on Mahabharata verses

The Ashvalayana shakha tradition revers Deva-svāmin highly, next only to the Vedic sage Ashvalayana himself. At least 14 commentaries on the Ashvalayana-grihya-sutra are known from manuscripts, but Deva-svāmin's bhashya is regarded as the one par excellence by historical writers. Gargya Narayana refers to him as "Bhagavan". Several writers simply refer to him as the Bhashya-kara or Bhashya-krit (the Commentator). Assuming that the dharma-shastra scholar was same as this Deva-svāmin, he was thus recognized an authority on grhya sutras, shrauta sutras, mimamsa, and dharma-shastra.
