= Harbeck =

Harbeck is a surname. Notable people with this surname include:

- Jan Harbeck (born 1975), Danish jazz musician
- Erich Wichmann-Harbeck (1900–1976), Chilean sailor and Olympian
