= Frank Jewett =

Frank Jewett may refer to:

- Frank Jewett (sailor), American Olympic sailor
- Frank B. Jewett, American engineer and physicist
