= Leon Jensz =

Polish sailor

Personal information
- Nationality: Polish
- Born: 15 June 1915; Khabarovsk, Russia
- Died: 16 May 1992 (aged 76); Saska Kępa, Poland

Sport
- Sport: Sailing

Leon Jensz (15 June 1915 – 16 May 1992) was a Polish sailor. He competed in the O-Jolle event at the 1936 Summer Olympics.
