= Miloslav Brepta =

Czech sailor (1902–1959)

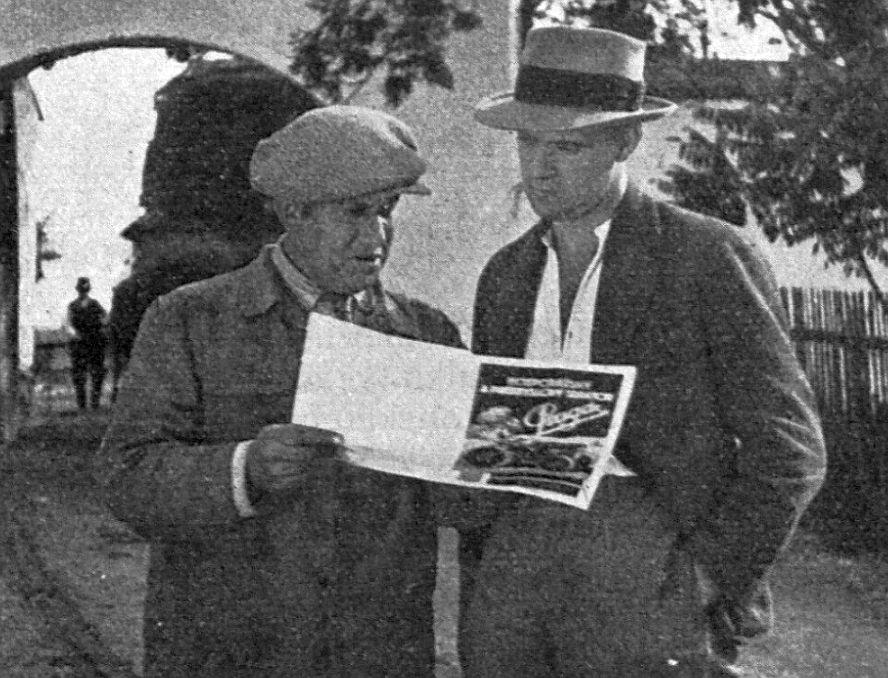
- Miloslav Brepta (right) in the movie

Personal information
- Nationality: Czech
- Born: 29 October 1902
- Died: 6 March 1959 (aged 56)

Sport
- Sport: Sailing, racecar driver, film actor

Miloslav Brepta (29 October 1902 – 6 March 1959) was a Czech sailor. He competed in the O-Jolle event at the 1936 Summer Olympics.
