= Demir Turgut =

Turkish sailor

Personal information
- Nationality: Turkish
- Born: 30 May 1909; Stockholm, Sweden
- Died: 10.08.1986; Istanbul, cemetery Karacaahmet

Sport
- Sport: Sailing

Demir Turgut (born 30 May 1909, date of death unknown) was a Turkish sailor. He competed in the O-Jolle event at the 1936 Summer Olympics.
