= 2018 Vintage Yachting Games =

Sailing competition

Event title
- Edition: 3rd
- Host: Kongelig Dansk Yachtklub; Hellerup Sejlklub

Event details
- Venue: Øresund; Denmark
- Dates: 16 – 22 September 2018
- Key people: * Host Club: (Denmark) Lars Ive Kongelig Dansk Yachtklub; (Denmark) Peter Stephensen Lübeck Hellerup Sejlklub; Vintage Yachting Games Organization: (Netherlands) Thies Bosch; (Netherlands) Rudy den Outer
- Opened by: Rasmus Knude (18 September 2018)

Classes
- Dinghies: 12' Dinghy (International 12' Rule) & O-Jolle
- Keelboats: Soling
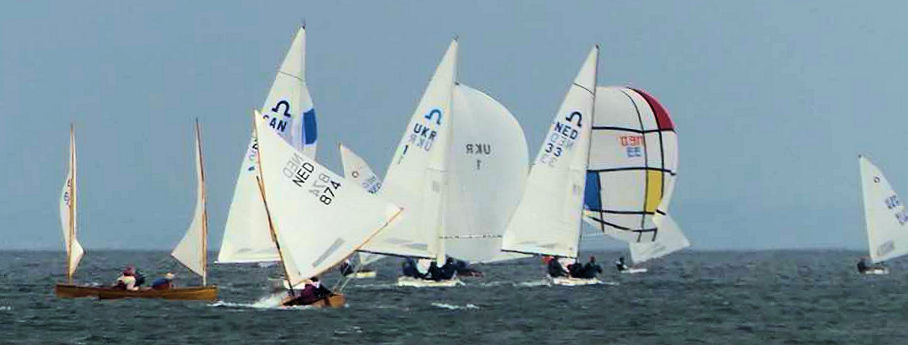
- VIP race: 12' Dinghy (International 12' Rule) All 2018 Vintage Yachting Games classes in one view

The 2018 Vintage Yachting Games was the third post-Olympic multi-class sailing event for discontinued Olympic and Paralympic Classes. The event was held from 16 to 22 September 2018 on Øresund, Copenhagen in Denmark. The organization of this event was executed by a joint venture of the Kongelig Dansk Yachtklub and the Hellerup Sejlklub. The Vintage Yachting Games Organization (VYGO) was the governing organization. The competition took place in 3 Vintage Yachting Classes.

== Prologue ==
=== First bidding process ===
The first bidding process was officially launched on 14 December 2010. The bidding process intended to run till 31 December 2011. This period was extended on request of several candidates.

Before the bidding process started there was an interest for hosting the event from:

- Germany Lake Chiemsee
- Romania Black Sea
- United Kingdom Weymouth and Portland National Sailing Academy
- Sweden Stockholm

During the bidding process this group extended with:

- Germany Boltenhagen
- France Douarnenez

The Vintage Yachting Games supervisory board finally voted unanimous to accept the bid of the Weymouth and Portland National Sailing Academy and not for reopening or extending the bidding process. The venue of the 2016 Vintage Yachting Games was formally announced during the closing ceremony of the 2012 edition.

=== Second bidding process ===
As soon as the Weymouth and Portland National Sailing Academy withdraw from the event a second bidding process was started for a postponed event in 2018. Bids arrived from four countries:

- Italy Circolo Nautico Punta Imperatore, Forio d’Ischia
- Denmark Kongelig Dansk Yachtklub and Hellerup Sejlklub
- Germany Lübecker Yacht – Club, (as part of the Travemünder Woche)
- Austria Union Yacht Club Attersee and the Segel Club Kammersee

The classes than had the possibility to vote. As result the Danish bid was chosen unanimously for the third edition (2018) and the Austria for the fourth edition (year t.b.d. 2020–2022). The dates of the 2018 Vintage were announced in 2016 to the Vintage classes.

==== Voting result ====
The bonus point system was used over the eight voting classes (no discard)
1 Denmark 10 points
2 Austria 47.7 points
3 Germany 53.4 points
4 Italy 64.4 points

== 2018 Vintage ==
=== Organization ===
Organizing committee
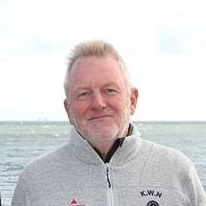
Lars Ive
Kongelig Dansk Yachtklub

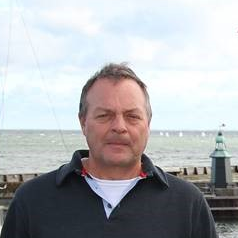
Peter Lübeck Stephenson
Hellerup Sejlklub

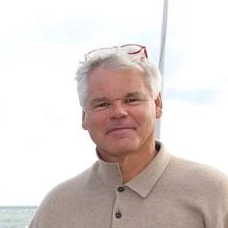
Thies Bosch
Vintage Yachting Games Organization

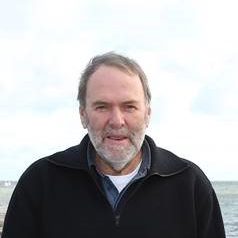
Rudy den Outer
Vintage Yachting Games Organization

	Race Management
Alpha Course	Bravo Course	Chairman of the jury
Peter Stephensen Lübeck	Jesper Adler	Jan Helge Madsen

=== Venue ===
As Venue for the 2018 Vintage Yachting Games the Øresund for Hellerup chosen. The hostclubs were the Kongelig Dansk Yachtklub and the Hellerup Sejlklub. The clubhouse and harbor of the Hellerup Sejlklub was used to facilitate the event.

Hellerup Sejlklub
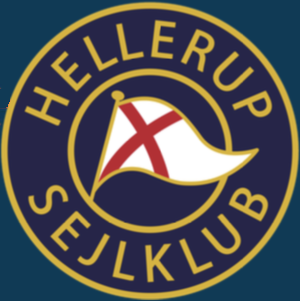

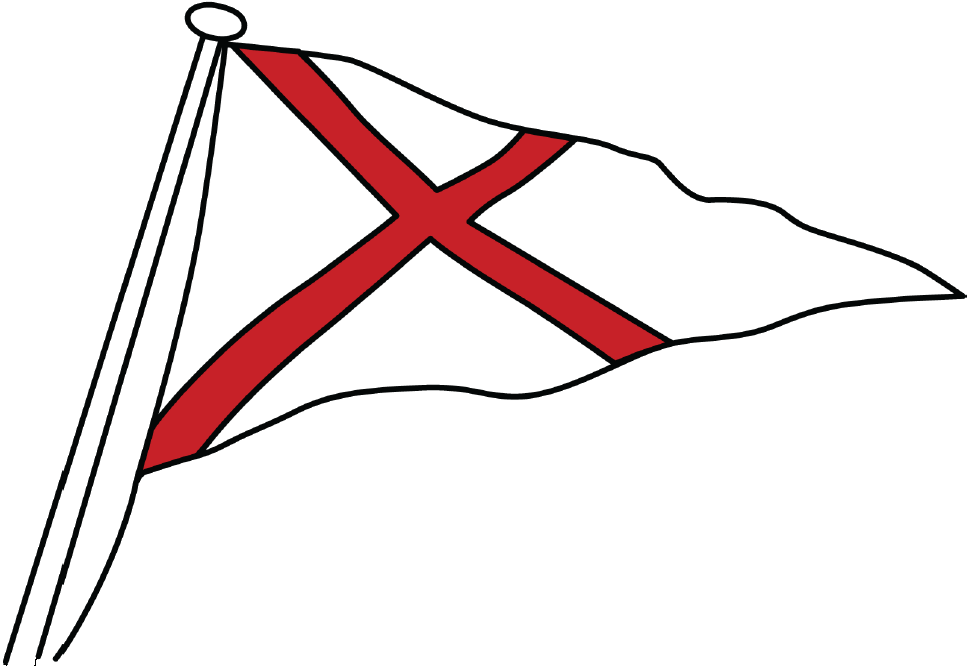
- Flag of Hellerup Sejlklub
- Full name: Hellerup Sejlklub
- Short name: HS
- Founded: 25 September 1915
- Location: Paul Elvstrøms Plads 1, DK-2900 Hellerup
- Commodore: Marie Dela Johnsen
- Focus: Hellerup Sailing Club is a club in constant development with a solid base in proud traditions, and provides members with a wide range of activities and opportunities.
Website
Official website
Harbor and Clubhouse
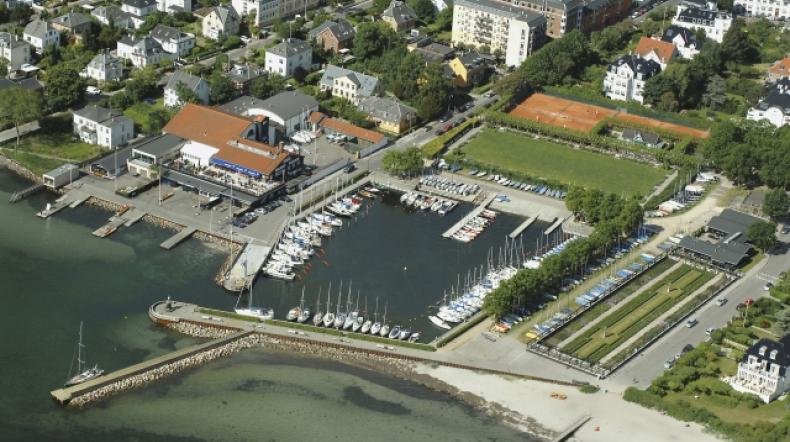
- Interactive map of Harbor and Clubhouse
- Coordinates: 55°43′55″N 12°34′53″E
- Country: Denmark
- Region: Hovedstaden
- City: Hellerup

Kongelig Dansk Yachtklub

- Burgee
- Full name: Royal Danish Yacht Club
- Short name: KDY
- Founded: 3 July 1866
- Location: Tuborg Havnepark 15, Hellerup, Copenhagen
- Commodore: Lars Ive

=== Calendar ===
The program of the 2018 Vintage Yachting Games was as follows:

Date	Main activity	Social events
16 September (Sunday)	* Registration	
17 September (Monday)	* Registration * Practice Race (14:00)	Opening ceremony
18 September (Tuesday)	Race 1 (13:00)	Daily prize giving
19 September (Wednesday)	Race 2 and 3	Daily prize giving
20 September (Thursday)	Race 4 and 5	* Championship dinner * Daily prize giving
21 September (Friday)	Race 6 & 7	Daily prize giving
22 September (Friday)	* Race 8 * VIP race	* Prize giving * Closing ceremony * Passing of the Flag

=== Competition ===
Continents	Countries	Classes	Boats	Sailors
4	12	3	32	38

Notable Sailors at the 2018 Vintage Yachting Games
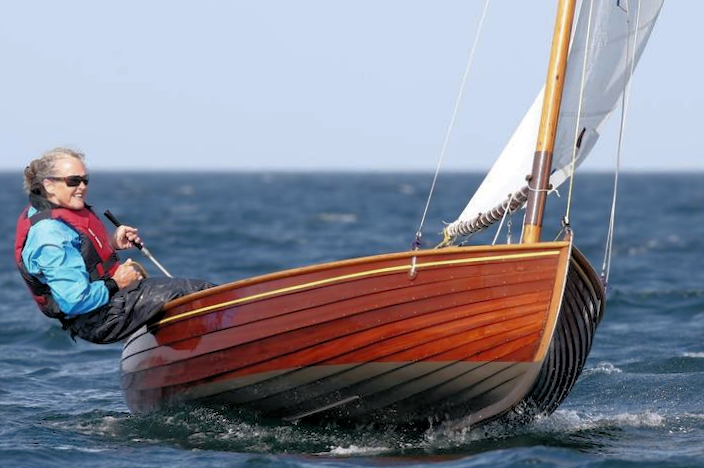
In 12' Dinghy:
Nicky Arnoldus (CAN), former Dutch Champion, during a race of the 2018 Vintage Yachting Games.

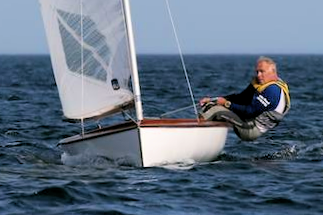
In O-Jolle:
Onno Klazinga (NED), competed against Paul Elvstrøm in 1963, during a race of the 2018 Vintage Yachting Games.

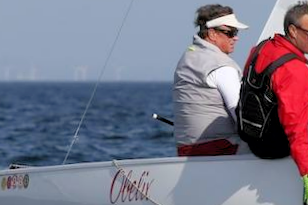
In Soling:
Peter Hall (CAN), Committee member World Sailing and three times Soling World Champion (in three continents), during a race of the 2018 Vintage Yachting Games.

=== Continents ===
- Africa
- Europe
- North America
- Asia

=== Countries ===
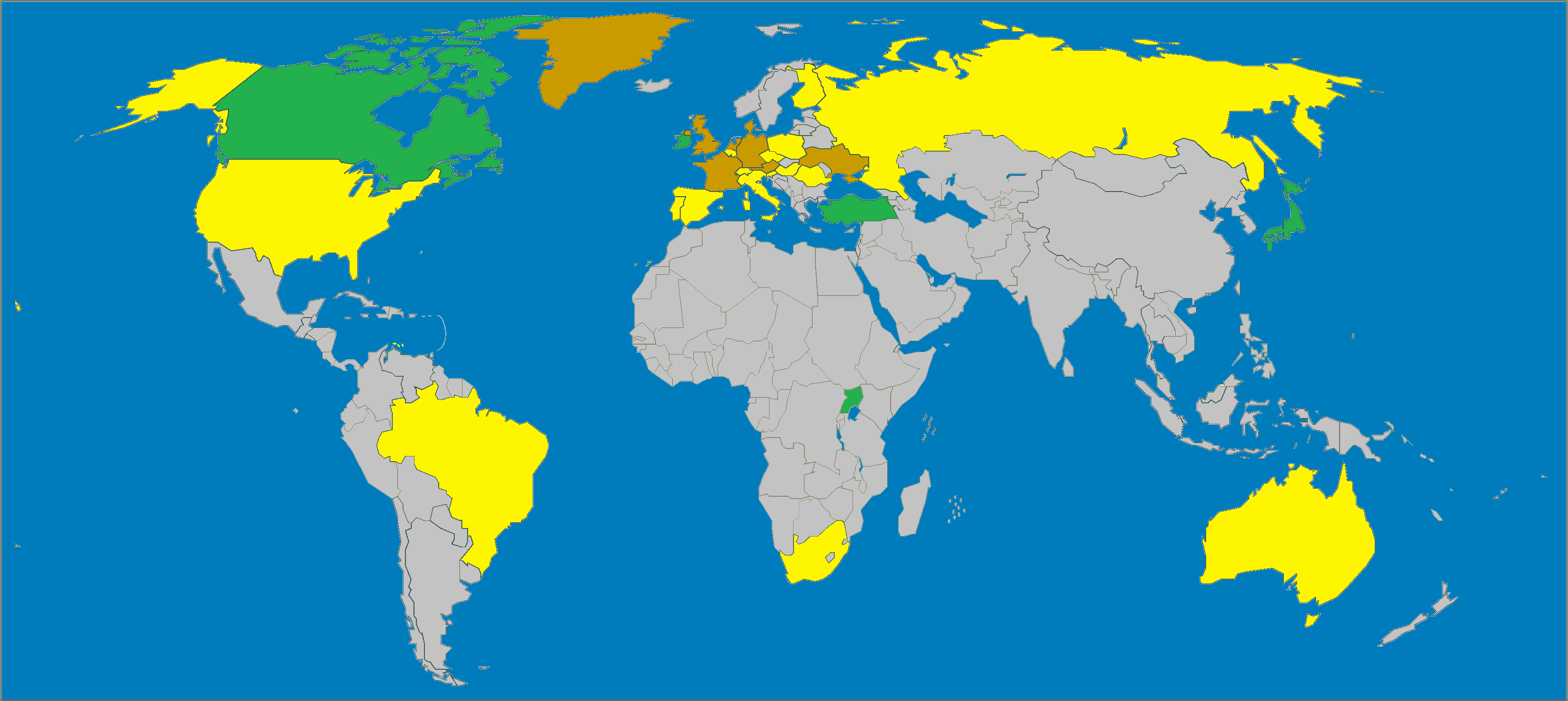
Countries that participated in the 2018 Vintage Yachting Games. Blue: Water Gray: Never participated in the Vintage Yellow: Participated in earlier Vintages Green: Country participated in her first Vintage Gold: Country participated also on previous Vintages

Austria	Canada	Denmark
France	United Kingdom	Germany
Ireland	Japan	Netherlands
Turkey	Uganda	Ukraine

=== Current Vintage Yachting Classes ===
Class	Type	Design	Sailors	Trapeze	Mainsail	Jibb/Genoa	Spinnaker	Gender	2008	2012	2018
Europe	Dinghy	One-Design	1	0	+	-	-		•	•	
Europe	Dinghy	One-Design	1	0	+	-	-		•	•	
12' Dinghy (International 12' Rule)	Dinghy	One-Design	1	0	+	-	-				•
12' Dinghy (International 12' Rule)	Dinghy	One-Design	1	0	+	-	-		VIP	VIP	VIP
2.4 Metre	Keelboat	Metre Rule	1	0	+	+	-				
O-Jolle	Dinghy	One-Design	1	0	+	-	-		•	•	•
12m² Sharpie	Dinghy	One-Design	2	0	+	+	-				
Flying Dutchman	Dinghy	One-Design	2	1	+	+	+		•	•	
Tempest	Keelboat	One-Design	2	1	+	+	+			•	
Yngling	Keelboat	One-Design	3	1	+	+	+				
Star	Keelboat	One-Design	2	0	+	+	-				
Soling	Keelboat	One-Design	3	0	+	+	+		•	•	•
Dragon	Keelboat	One-Design	285 kg max. 4	0	+	+	+		•	•	
5.5 Metre	Keelboat	Metre Rule	3	0	+	+	+			•	
6 Metre	Keelboat	Metre Rule	5	0	+	+	+				
Events									7	9	4

- • = Event in this year
- VIP = Used for the Vintage Inter Pares race
- = Open event
- = Female event
- = Male event
Current Vintage Yachting Classes

Due to circumstances that varied by class only three out of 12 of the Vintage Yachting Classes participated in the 2018 Vintage Yachting Games at Hellerup.

2018 Participating Vintage Yachting Classes
Pictures of the Active Vintage Yachting Classes 2018 at Øresund
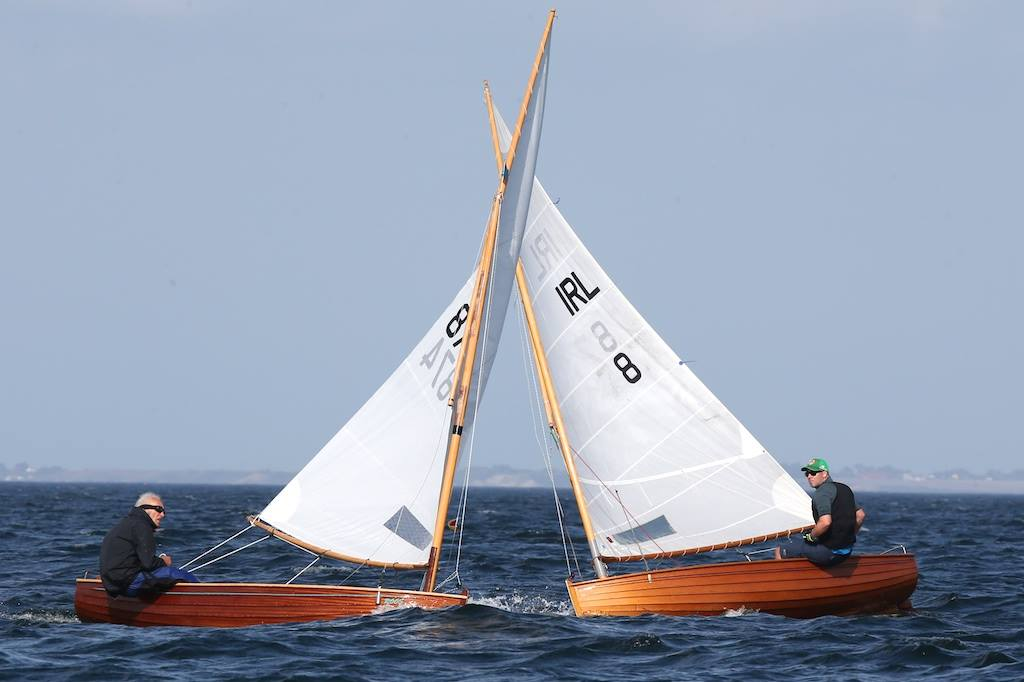
12' Dinghy

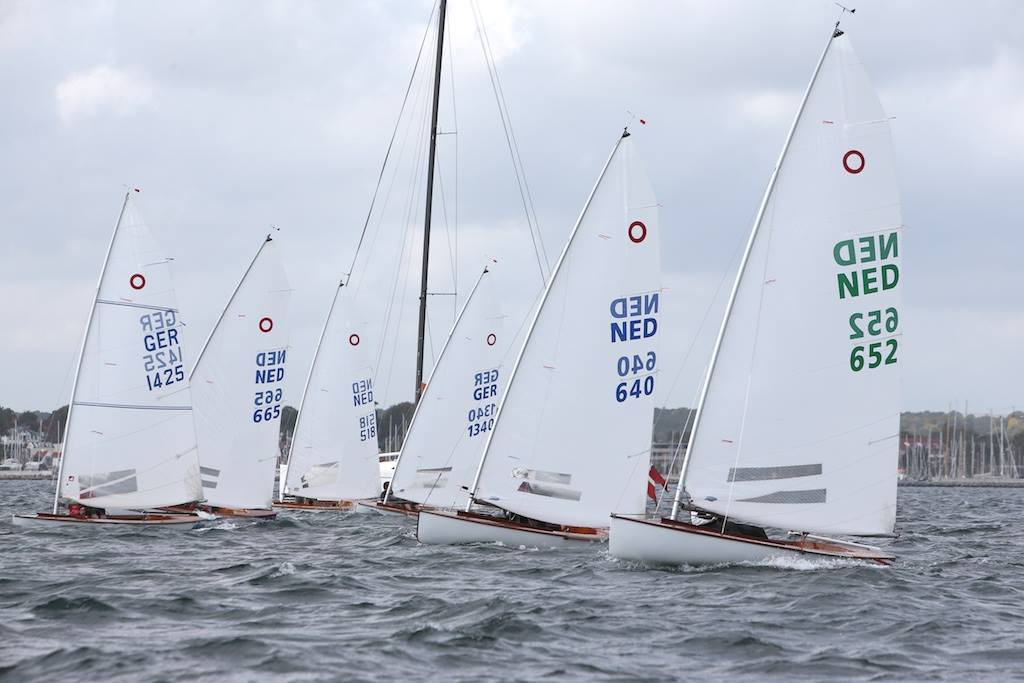
O-Jolle

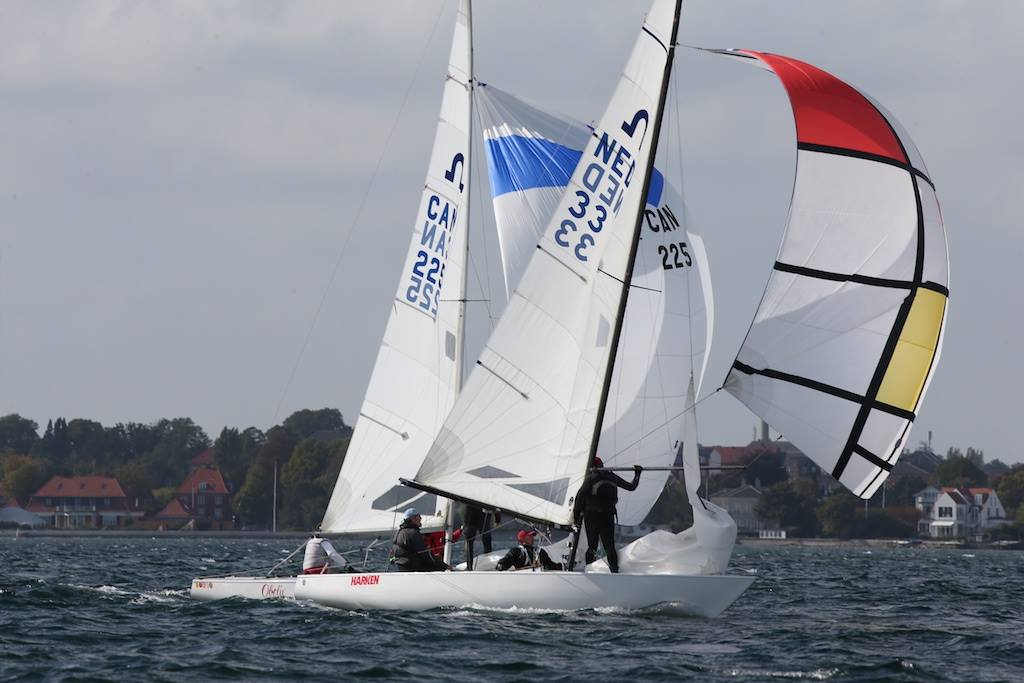
Soling

=== Course Area's and Courses ===
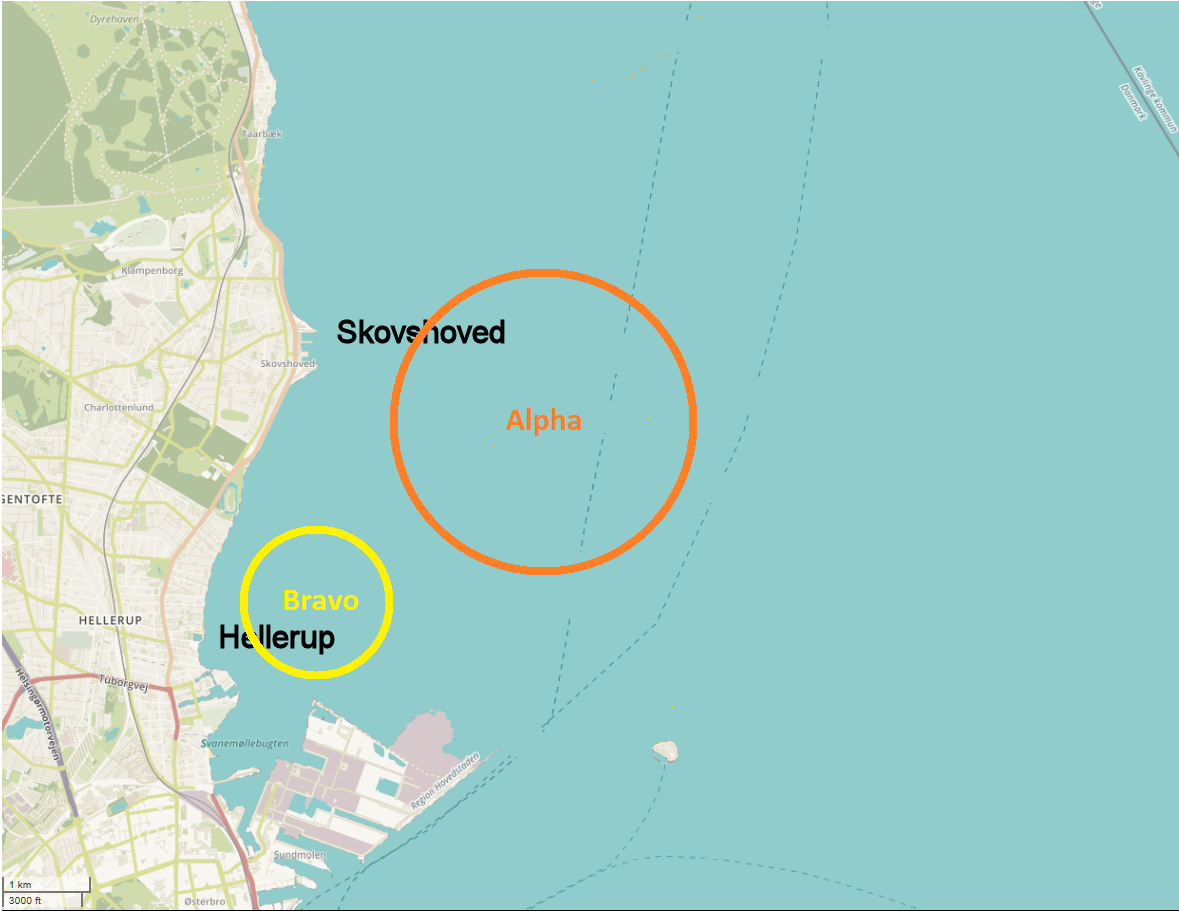
Course Area's
* Alpha
* Bravo

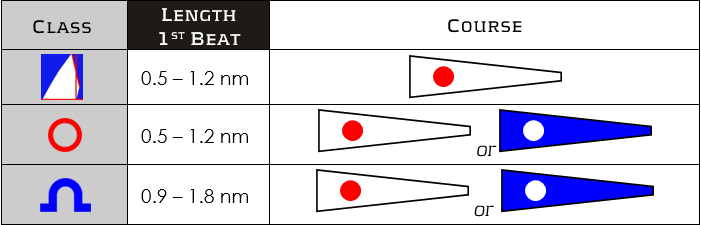
Course Information

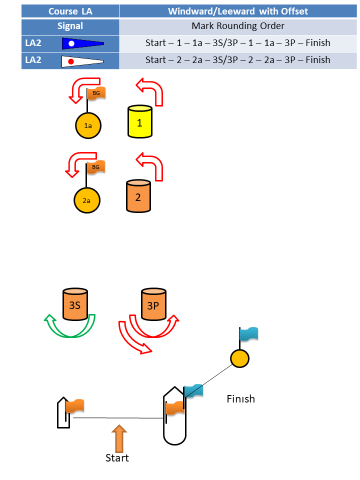
Course Configurations

=== Wind conditions ===
The Øresund in front of the Hellerup Sejlklub was during the 2018 Vintage Yachting Games one of the targets of the remains of the Hurricane Florence. This resulted in South-Westerly winds that varied between 12 and 38 knots over the period of the Vintage.

Date	Remark	Wind direction	Wind speed (kn)
18-SEP-2018	Grand yachting weather All classes at race area Alpha	SW	12-16
19-SEP-2018	Strong yachting weather 12' Dinghies moved to race area Bravo	SW	15-20
20-SEP-2018	Strong yachting weather 12' Dinghies on race area Bravo; Wind veered and died when Florance announced herself	SW veering to NW	20-4
21-SEP-2018	Races cancelled	SW	25-38
22-SEP-2018	Very strong yachting weather Soling moved to race area Bravo; 12' Dinghy and O-Jolle cancelled	SW	22-31

=== Measurement ===
Since all three classes just had major championships that include measurement, no measurement took place in this Vintage.

=== Opening ceremony ===
The opening ceremony took place in the main hall of the club house of the Hellerup Sejlklub. The formal opening was done by Rasmus Knude of Hellerup Sejlklub.

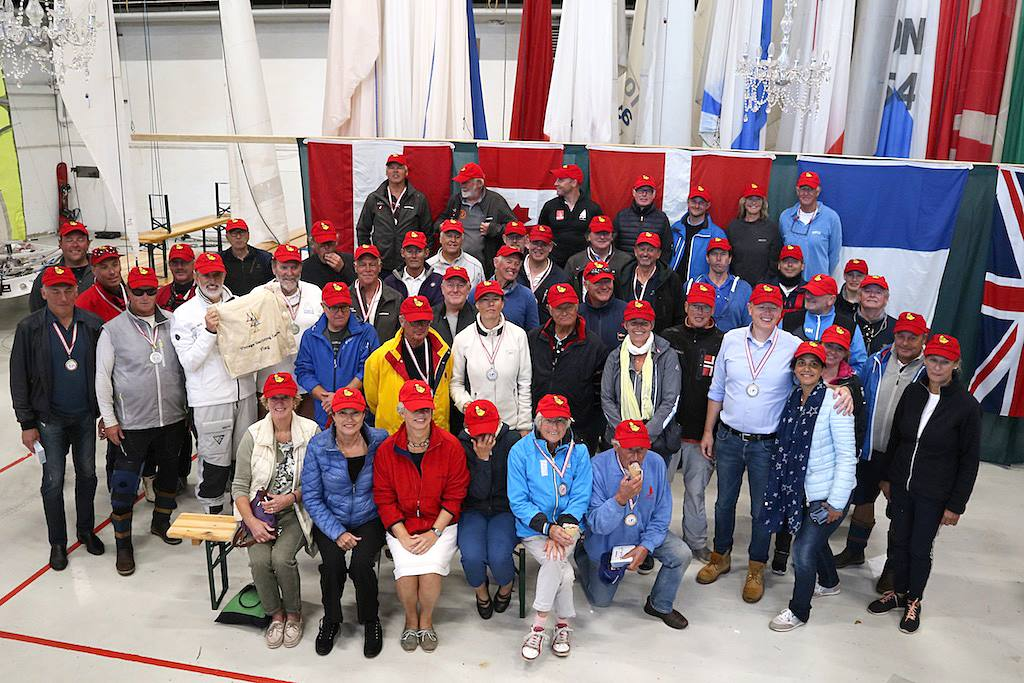

=== Closing ceremony ===
Due to the weather conditions the VIP race could not be started. So the closing ceremony started with the prize giving by Lars Ive and Peter Lübeck Stephenson.

During the closing of the event Rudy den Outer handed over stainless remembrance plate with the Vintage logo to Peter Lübeck Stephenson. He also announced that the Union-Yacht-Club Attersee will be the host of the next Vintage Yachting Games. However, before the date will be set an evaluation with the classes and organizers will take place. After that the Vintage flag was received from Lars Ive, representing the Copenhagen organization. The flag was subsequently handed over to Stephan Beurle representing Austria as the next host country.

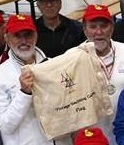
Rudy den Outer and Stephan Beurle (AUT) holding the Vintage flag.)

=== Media Coverage ===
Pictures and video footage was received for Creative Commons Attribution-Share Alike 4.0 International distribution from:

- Per Heegaard
- Ann Fillipa Madsen
- Lars Ive
- and others

== Sailing ==
Races in all events were sailed in a fleet racing format of eight scheduled races. The contestants raced around a course in one group, and each boat earned a score equal conform the bonus point system. Due to wind conditions not all scheduled races could be sailed.

=== Reports per event ===
Per class separate pages reporting the facts are available (see the details section per class in the medals table).

=== Report Vintage InterPares race ===
Due to the weather conditions the VIP race could not be sailed. Since all winners came from the Netherlands the decision was made to sail the VIP race on a later date in 2018/2019 somewhere in the Netherlands. This is in line with the history of the 12' Dinghy at the 1920 Summer Olympics were the last race was not sailed in Belgium but in The Netherlands.

== Medal summary ==
=== Medals ===
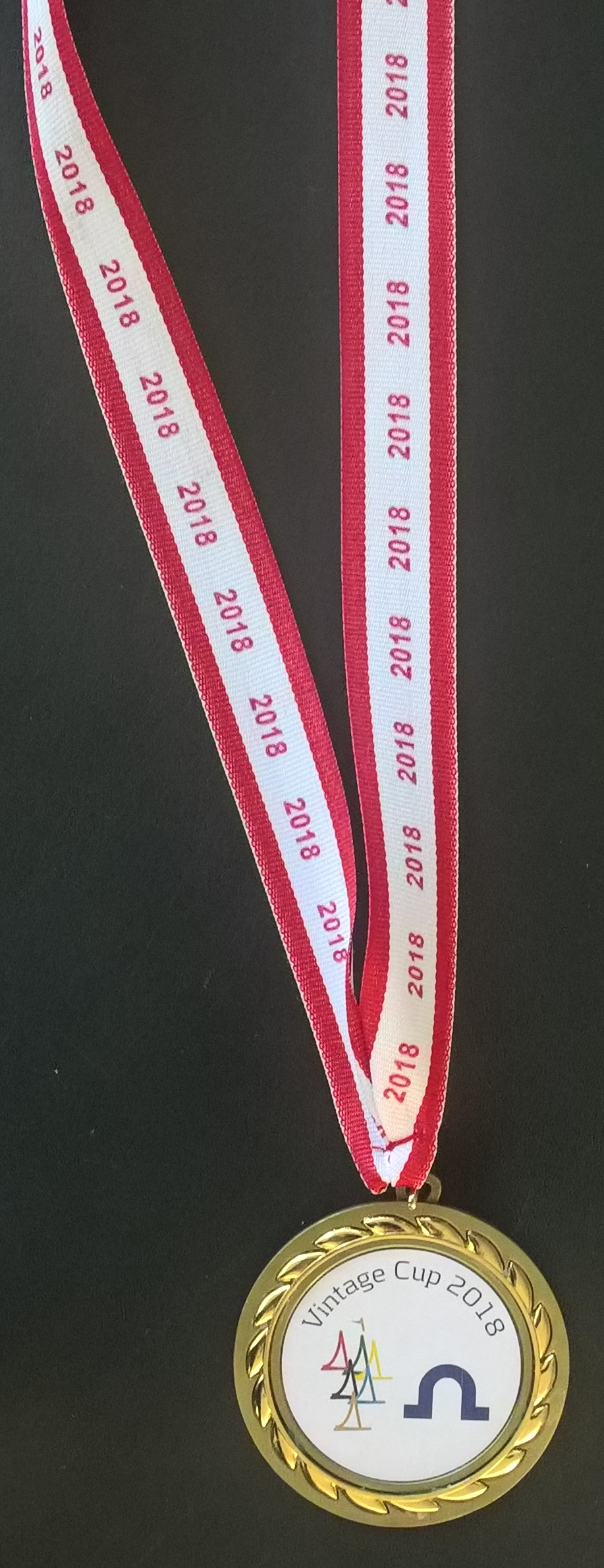
Example of a 2018 Vintage Yachting Games Medal

Event	Gold	Silver	Bronze
12' Dinghy; International Rule:	Netherlands; Wim Bleeker	Netherlands; Jurri Rooyackers; Turkey; Anïl CETIN (Alternating helmsmen); Germany; Elena Romana GASENZER	Netherlands; Hans Reyers; Anneke Reyers
O-Jolle:	Netherlands; Thies Bosch	Netherlands; Klaas de Boer	Netherlands; Onno Klazinga
Soling:	Netherlands; Rudy den Outer; Theo de Lange; Gabor Helmhout	Canada; Peter W. Hall; Johan Offermans; Gord de Vries	Ukraine; Igor Yushko; Serhiy Pichuhin; Sergiy Ivansits

=== Vintage 2018 ===
Rank	Nation	Gold	Silver	Bronze	Total
1	Netherlands (NED)	3	2	2	7
2	Canada (CAN)	0	1	0	1
3	Ukraine (UKR)	0	0	1	1
Totals (3 entries)		3	3	3	9

=== Vintage 2008–2018 ===
Rank	Nation	Gold	Silver	Bronze	Total
1	Netherlands (NED)	7	6	4	17
2	Germany (GER)	2	4	4	10
3	Ukraine (UKR)	2	0	1	3
4	Denmark (DEN)	1	1	2	4
5	Austria (AUT)	1	1	1	3
6	France (FRA)	1	0	1	2
7	Finland (FIN)	1	0	0	1
7	Hungary (HUN)	1	0	0	1
7	Switzerland (SUI)	1	0	0	1
10	Spain (ESP)	0	1	2	3
11	Canada (CAN)	0	1	0	1
11	Great Britain (GBR)	0	1	0	1
11	Italy (ITA)	0	1	0	1
11	Wildcards	0	1	0	1
15	Australia (AUS)	0	0	1	1
15	Russia (RUS)	0	0	1	1
Totals (16 entries)		17	17	17	51

=== Country Trophy ===
The best ranked competitor per class per country scores point for his country based on his overall ranking and the 1964 Olympic scoring system. The highest scored country wins the Country trophy.

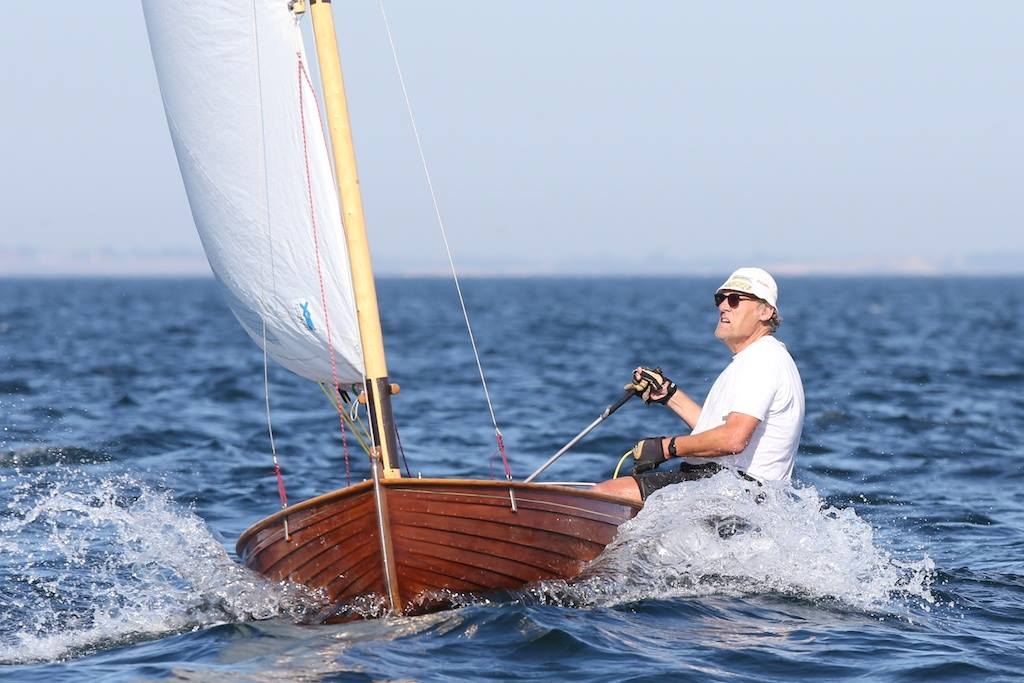
For the first time in history took Africa the third place in the Country ranking due to Bert Hamminga Uganda.

Rank	Class (Entries)	12' Dinghy International Rule (19)		O-Jolle (7)		Soling (6)		Total points
Rank	Country	Rank	Points	Rank	Points	Rank	Points	Total points
1	Netherlands	1	1379	1	946	1	879	3204
2	Canada	9	426			2	578	1004
3	Uganda	5	680					680
4	Germany	17	150	4	344			494
5	Ireland	8	477					477
6	Ukraine					3	402	402
7	Turkey	10	380					380
8	France	12	301					301
9	United Kingdom	15	204					204
10	Austria					5	180	180
11	Denmark					6	101	101
11	Japan	19	101					101
