= Ernst Kornemann =

German classical historian (1868–1946)

Ernst Kornemann (11 October 1868, Rosenthal near Kassel – 4 December 1946, Munich) was a German classical historian.

== Biography ==
He studied at Giessen (1878–89) and Berlin (1889–92), and took the degree of doctor of philosophy (1891); he was appointed assistant professor teaching under the faculty (1892). He became privatdocent of ancient history at Giessen (1892) and then professor at Tübingen (1902). With Dr. Lehmann-Haupt, of Liverpool, he established the periodical Klio, dedicated to ancient history.

== Literary works ==
His publications include:

- 1891 De civibus Romanis in provinciis imperii consistentibus.
- 1896 Die historische Schriftstellerei des Consuls Asinius Pollio.
- 1903 Zur Geschichte der Graechenzeit.
- 1904 Die neue Livius-Epitome aus Oxyrhynchus.
- 1905 Kaiser Hadrian und der letzte grosse Historiker von Rom.
- 1912 Priesterkodex in der Regia und die Entstehung der altrömische Pseudogeschichte.
- 1921 Mausoleum und Tatenbericht des Augustus, Leizpg: Teubner.
- 1923 Einleitung in die Altertumswissenschaft (edited by Alfred Gercke and Eduard Norden; Bd. 3, Halbband 2).
- 1926 Vom antiken Staat, Berlin: Ferdinand Hirt.
- 1927 Die Stellung der Frau in der vorgriechischen Mittelmeerkultur, Heidelberg: C. Winter.
- 1929 Staat und Wirtschaft, Breslau: M.& H. Marcus.
- 1929 Neue Dokumente zum lakonischen Kaiserkult, Breslau: M.& H. Marcus.
- 1930 Doppelprinzipat und Reichsteilung im Imperium Romanum, Leipzig: Teubner.
- 1934 Staaten, Völker, Männer, Leipzig: Dieterich.
- 1934 Die unsichtbaren Grenzen des Römischen Kaiserreiches, Budapest: Ungarische Akademie der Wissenschaften.
- 1937 Augustus, Breslau: Priebatsch's Buchhandlung.
- 1941 Das Imperium Romanum, Breslau: Korn.
- 1942 Große Frauen des Altertums, Leipzig: Dieterich.
- 1943 Gestalten und Reiche, Leipzig: Dieterich.
- 1946 Tacitus, Wiesbaden: Dieterich.
- 1947 Das Prinzipat des Tiberius und der "Genius Senatus", München: Verlag der Bayerischen Akademie des Wissenschaften.
- 1949 Weltgeschichte des Mittelmeerraumes. Von Philipp II. von Makedonien bis Muhammed, edition of Hermann Bengtson (Teilabdruck 1978: Geschichte der Spätantike).
