= Peter Funke =

German ancient historian (born 1950)

Peter Funke (born 18 March 1950 in Rheine) is a German ancient historian.

== Life ==
Peter Funke studied history and German studies at the University of Münster from 1969 to 1974. From 1975 to 1978, he held a research assistant position at the ancient history department of the institute for ancient world studies at the University of Cologne. In 1978, he received a doctorate from the University of Cologne, after which he continued to work as a research assistant at Cologne until 1985. Between 1979 and 1981, Funke simultaneously taught the subject of ancient history at the University of Siegen. In 1985, he achieved the habilitation at Cologne for a work entitled, Untersuchungen zur Geschichte und Struktur des Aitolischen Bundes (Research on the History and Structure of the Aetolian League). Thereafter, Funke taught as C3-Professor of Ancient History at the University of Siegen until 1988. Since then, he has served as Professor of Ancient History and the University of Münster. In addition, Funke is leader of the research project Historische Landeskunde des antiken Griechenland (Historical Study of Ancient Greek Regionalism) and since 1991 has been Pro-rector for Teaching and Student Affairs at the University of Münster. In 1999, Peter Funke refused a professorial position at LMU Munich.

Funke's research focusses are the history of the Greek state system from Mycenaean to Roman times, Greek historiography, ancient constitutional history, ancient regionalism and historical geography, as well as the relationship between religion and rulership in antiquity. Within the German Universities Excellence Initiative, he is employed in the Münster funded excellence group, Religion und Politik with the role of cults and sanctuaries in ancient treaties.

Funke was pro-rector for Teaching and Student Affairs at the University of Münster, as well as a member of the Joint Academic Reform Commission of North Rhine-Westphalia and of the working group, "New Media in Higher Education" of the German Rectors' Conference.

From 1996 to 2004, Peter Funke was subject evaluator for Ancient History and deputy chair of the specialist committee of Ancient World Studies for the Deutsche Forschungsgemeinschaft (DFG). From 2004 to 2005, he was also speaker for the "Ancient Cultures" review board. He has had close contact with scholars of other disciplines since 1995 as the DFG liaison for the University of Münster. Since 2005, he has belonged to the senate and steering committee, as well as the senate subcommittee for Perspektiven der Forschung (Perspectives on Research). In 2010, he became vice-president of DFG for the humanities.

Funke has been a member of the Kommission für Alte Geschichte und Epigraphik in the German Archaeological Institute since 1988 and an ordinary member of the German Archaeological Institute since 1989. In 1997, the International Academy of Paedagogical Scholarship in Moscow selected him for membership. In 2007, he became project leader for Inscriptiones Graecae. He is also a board member and managing director of the Institute for Interdisciplinary Cypriot Studies at the University of Münster. In 2011, he became one of the editors of the ancient historical journal Klio. Funke has been a board member of the "European Research Centre for Ancient Eastern Mediterranean Cultures" (CAMC) since 2009, a consortium founded and based at the University of Tartu in Estonia, which also includes the University of Münster and the University of Helsinki.

Funke has held several roles in the Union of German Historians (VHD). From 1990 to 1992, he was the subject representative for ancient history on the union's board, then deputy chair of the union (1992–2000) and finally chair (2004–2008).

== Selected writings ==
- 1980. Homónoia und Arché. Athen und die griechische Staatenwelt vom Ende des Peloponnesischen Krieges bis zum Königsfrieden (404/3–387/6 v. Chr.) (Homonoia and Arche. Athens and the Greek State System from the End of the Peloponessian War to the King's Peace (404/3-387/6 BC), Wiesbaden 1980, (Historia-Einzelschriften, Vol. 37), ISBN 3-515-03007-7
- 1999. Athen in klassischer Zeit (Athens in Classical Times), C. H. Beck, Munich. 3rd Edition, 2007 (C.H.Beck Wissen), ISBN 3-406-44574-8. (with Italian and Spanish translations)
