= Daan Kagchelland =

Dutch sailor (1914–1998)

Personal information
- Full name: Daniël Marinus Johannes Kagchelland
- Nationality: Dutch
- Born: 25 March 1914 Rotterdam
- Died: 24 December 1998 (aged 84) The Hague

Sport

Sailing career
- Class: O-Jolle
- Club: Rotterdamsche Zeilvereeniging
Medal record
sailing
Representing Netherlands
Gold medal – first place	1936 Berlin	O-Jolle
- Updated on 2014-01-04

Danièl "Daan" Marinus Johannes Kagchelland (25 March 1914 Rotterdam – 24 December 1998, The Hague) was a sailor from the Netherlands, who represented his country at the 1936 Summer Olympics in Berlin, Germany. There Kagchelland won the gold medal in the O-Jolle.

== Sources ==
- "Daan Kagchelland Bio, Stats, and Results". Olympic Sports. Sports-Reference.com. Archived from the original on 2013-12-04.
- "Na de Olympische Spelen te Berlijn. Ons land behoort tot de sterkste Sport-naties der wereld" (in Dutch) (Dag ed.). De Graafschap-bode. 1936-08-19.
- "The XITH Olympic Games Berlin, 1936: Officiel Report, Volume I" (PDF). Berlin: the Organisationskomitee für die XI. Olympiade Berlin 1936 e. V. 1936. Archived from the original (PDF) on 2007-07-09.
- "The XITH Olympic Games Berlin, 1936: Officiel Report, Volume II" (PDF). Berlin: the Organisationskomitee für die XI. Olympiade Berlin 1936 e. V. 1936. Archived from the original (PDF) on 2007-07-09.
