= Charles Eriksson =

Swedish sailor

Personal information
- Nationality: Swedish
- Born: 12 December 1907; Stockholm, Sweden
- Died: 31 January 1964 (aged 56); Stockholm, Sweden

Sport
- Sport: Sailing

Charles Eriksson (12 December 1907 – 31 January 1964) was a Swedish sailor. He competed in the O-Jolle event at the 1936 Summer Olympics.
