= Norio Fujimura =

Japanese sailor

Personal information
- Nationality: Japanese
- Born: 14 November 1914

Sport
- Sport: Sailing

Norio Fujimura (born 14 November 1914, date of death unknown) was a Japanese sailor. He competed in the O-Jolle event at the 1936 Summer Olympics.
