= Sigurd Christensen =

Danish sailor

Personal information
- Nationality: Danish
- Born: 16 April 1911; Copenhagen, Denmark
- Died: 23 November 1963 (aged 52); Hørsholm, Denmark

Sport
- Sport: Sailing

Sigurd Christensen (16 April 1911 – 23 November 1963) was a Danish sailor. He competed in the O-Jolle event at the 1936 Summer Olympics.
