= Jerzy Dzięcioł =

Polish sailor

Personal information
- Nationality: Polish
- Born: 1 September 1911; Warsaw, Russian Empire
- Died: 28 August 2004 (aged 92); Delta, British Columbia, Canada

Sport
- Sport: Sailing

Jerzy Dzięcioł (1 September 1911 – 28 August 2004) was a Polish sailor. He competed in the O-Jolle event at the 1936 Summer Olympics.
