= Anton Ström =

Swedish sailor

Personal information
- Nationality: Swedish
- Born: 30 July 1910; Stockholm, Sweden
- Died: 17 December 1994 (aged 84); Sollerön, Sweden

Sport
- Sport: Sailing

Anton Ström (30 July 1910 – 17 December 1994) was a Swedish sailor. He competed in the O-Jolle event at the 1936 Summer Olympics.
