= Walter Heuer (sailor) =

Brazilian sailor

Personal information
- Nationality: Brazilian
- Born: 26 June 1892; Hamburg, Germany
- Died: 14 March 1968 (aged 75); São Paulo, Brazil

Sport
- Sport: Sailing

Walter Heuer (26 June 1892 – 14 March 1968) was a Brazilian sailor. He competed in the O-Jolle event at the 1936 Summer Olympics.
