= Werner Krogmann =

German sailor (1901–1954)

Medal record

Men's sailing

Representing Germany

Olympic Games
Silver medal – second place	1936 Berlin	Monotype class (O-Jolle)

Werner Herman Otto Krogmann (February 5, 1901 – November 19, 1954) was a German sailor. He won the Silver medal in Monotype class (O-Jolle) in the 1936 Summer Olympics in Berlin.
