= Hellmut Stauch =

South African sailor

Personal information
- Nationality: South African
- Born: 13 March 1910; Eisenach, Germany
- Died: 19 July 1970 (aged 60); Maputo, Mozambique

Sport
- Sport: Sailing

Hellmut Stauch (13 March 1910 – 19 July 1970) was a South African sailor. He competed at the 1952 Summer Olympics and the 1960 Summer Olympics.
