= Erich Wichmann-Harbeck =

Chilean sailor

Personal information
- Nationality: Chilean
- Born: 27 October 1900
- Died: 24 August 1976 (aged 75)

Sport
- Sport: Sailing

Erich Wichmann-Harbeck (27 October 1900 – 24 August 1976) was a Chilean sailor. He competed in the O-Jolle event at the 1936 Summer Olympics.
