= Friedrich Marx =

German classical philologist

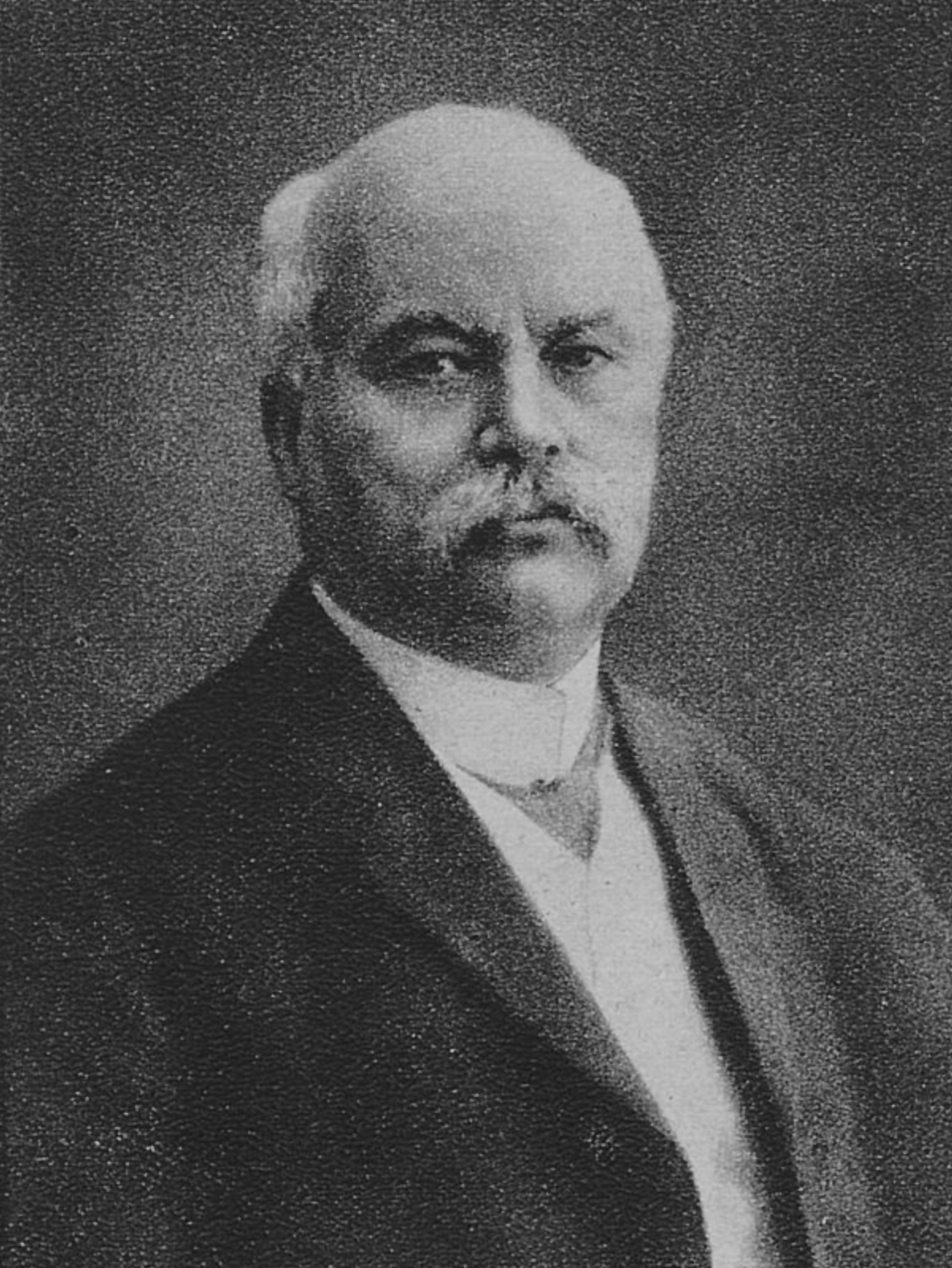
Friedrich Marx

Friedrich Marx (April 22, 1859 – October 17, 1941) was a German classical philologist born in Bessungen — today part of the city of Darmstadt.

In 1877 he began his study of classical philology at the University of Giessen, then continued his education at the University of Bonn under Franz Bücheler (1837-1908) and Hermann Usener (1834-1905). In 1887 he achieved his habilitation in Berlin with Johannes Vahlen (1830-1911), afterwards working as a professor at the Universities of Rostock (1888–89), Greifswald (1889–93), Breslau (1893–96), Vienna (1896–99), Leipzig (1899-1906) and finally at Bonn (1906-1927), where in 1917-18 he served as university rector.

Marx is considered to be the last representative of the so-called Bonn school of classical philology, a scholastic entity that was initiated by Friedrich Wilhelm Ritschl (1806-1876) in the 1840s. He was the author of numerous scholarly works, including editions of: Plautus' play "Rudens" (1928), writings by the encyclopaedist Aulus Cornelius Celsus (1915), Filastrius' "Diversarum hereseon liber" (1898), fragments from the satirist Gaius Lucilius (1894–95) and a critical examination of "Rhetorica ad Herennium" (1894); the latter work being published over several editions up to the year 1993.

From 1925 to 1934 he was editor of the journal Rheinisches Museum für Philologie ("Rhenish Museum for Philology").
