= Stefan de Vries =

Dutch writer and journalist (born 1970)

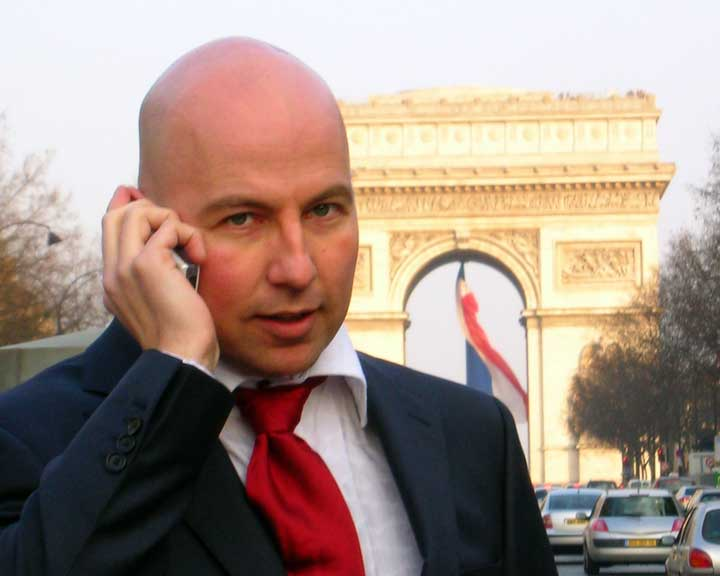
Stefan de Vries

Stefan de Vries (Dutch pronunciation: [ˈsteːfɑn də ˈvris]; born 13 June 1970) is a Dutch writer and journalist. He is most recently known for his plea to upgrade the current democratic system.

== Biography ==
De Vries was born in Middelburg and grew up in Zeeland. He studied law at the University of Amsterdam. In 1999 he moved to Paris, where he worked for Prisma Presse. A few years later he finished a director's course at the New York Film Academy. He then studied Art History and Archeology at the Paris-Sorbonne University. Since 2005 he is full-time journalist.

De Vries currently is a European affairs news correspondent in the Netherlands for BNR Nieuwsradio. He comments on French politics in the TV-show '28 Minutes' on Arte France and previously on 'Politics' or 'The World This Week' on France 24. In December 2015, de Vries started his own podcast called "So French".

On 26 June 2012, he received the Prix de l’Initiative européenne from the Maison de l'Europe de Paris for his journalistic work. On 13 June 2013, he received the EuroNederlander Award 2013 from the European Movement Netherlands (EBN) for his "outstanding and constructive contribution to the European debate in the Netherlands".

== Bibliography ==
- Stefan de Vries, De Francyclopedie ("The Francyclopedia"), New Tailor Holding, 2009, ISBN 9789080888098
- Roel Wolbrink & Stefan de Vries, Het blauwe boekje ("The Little Blue Book"), Bluebeard Publications, 2017, ISBN 9789082589627
- Stefan de Vries & Marijn Kruk, Onder mijn zolen! ("Under my soles!"), New Tailor Holding, 2011, ISBN 9789080888067
