= Julius Friedrich Heinrich Abegg =

German criminalist (1796–1868)

Julius Friedrich Heinrich Abegg (23 March 1796 – 29 May 1868) was a German criminalist.

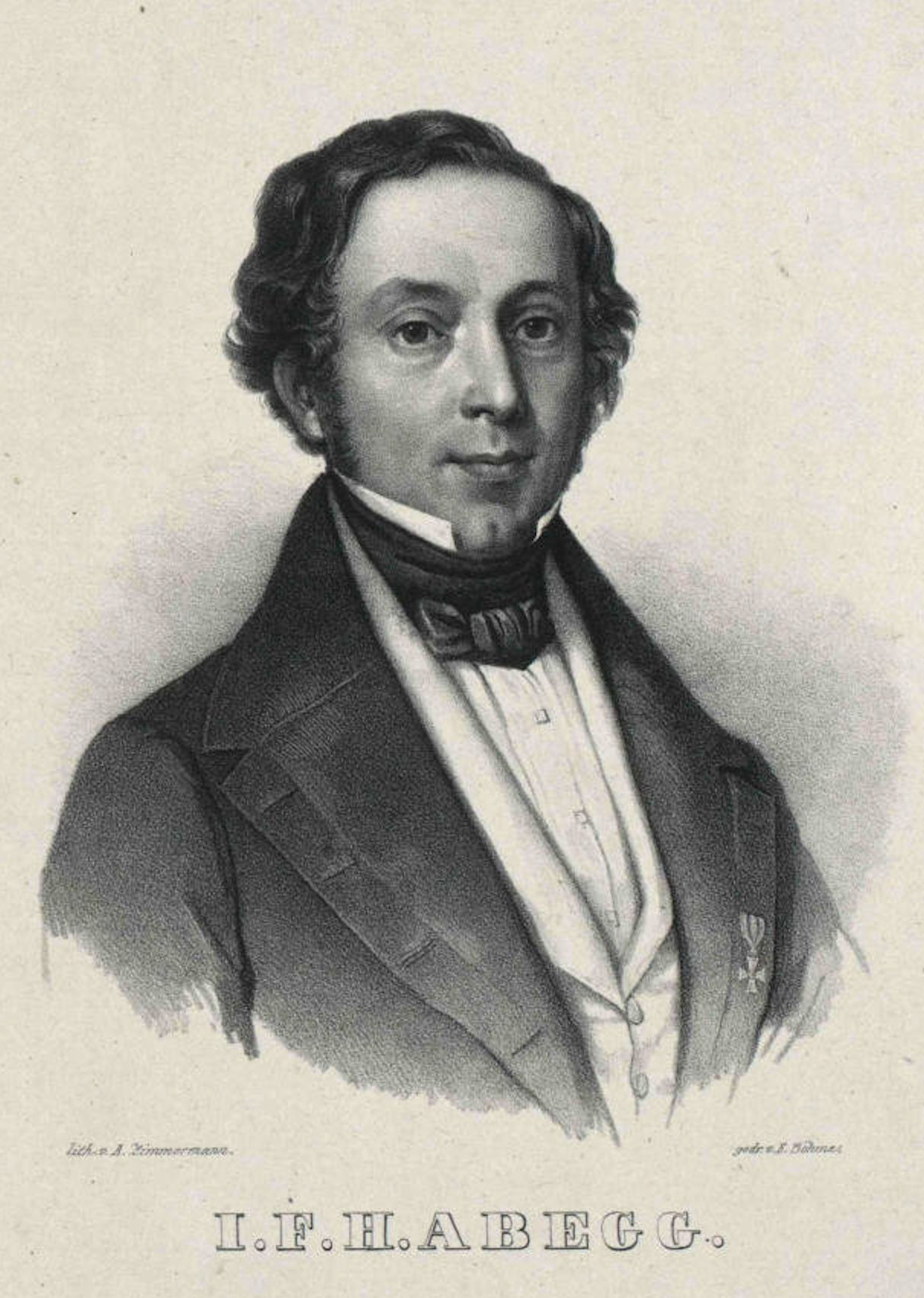
Image of Julius Friedrich Heinrich

== Life ==
Abegg was born in Erlangen as the son of the Reformed preacher Dr. Johannes Wilhelm Abegg (1768–1806), who later moved to Königsberg in Prussia to become councillor of the consistory, superintendent and later chaplain of the Court. Julius Abegg was educated at the Ecole Française and the German-Polish College in Königsberg, later at the colleges of Erlangen and Nuremberg. At the age of 17, he went to the University of Erlangen to study law. He continued his studies in Heidelberg and Landshut, where he earned his doctorate.

Before lecturing, he went to practise his studies at the regional court of Erlangen under the guidance of judge Wolfgang Puchta and professor Eduard August Feuerbach. In 1819 he went to Berlin, where he listened to Biener, Göschen, Hegel and Savigny. In 1821 he became extraordinary professor at the University of Königsberg and in 1824 regular professor. In 1826 Abegg moved to the University of Breslau, in 1833 he was awarded a doctorate in philosophy from the University of Erlangen.

In the following, he was delegate of the Prussian Regional Synod, head of the Presbyteries of the Court, curator of the Reformed College, member of the Society for the Betterment of Detainees and participated at the German Juristical Congress. He was awarded the title of Privy Judiciary Council. Abegg died in Breslau.

== Theories ==
Julius Abegg was advocate for and founder of the Theory of Equitableness. In this theory the punishment is to be based on equitableness and should cancel with the breach of the law. Equitableness alone decides on the precondition, the degree and the manner of a punishment, yet taking into account the motives of the accused. While the act of the crime and the punishment are as such not comparable, cultural and temporal customs can provide values for their comparison. If the punishment is determined according to these ideas, it would provide retribution of the deed, the criminal's right of a just penalty, deterrence of others and protection of society.

The aspect of retribution for the deed may be the reason that Abegg was also an advocate for death penalty. In a review he states that for him death penalty is not a revenge, not violence against a crime - no, it shall be the revocation of the wrong, highly personified, so that it can not persist anymore without objection. He attributes a life an unlimited value, so that a death becomes the unlimited evil.

== Publications ==
His works lie mostly in the area of criminal law, only sometimes in civil law or natural science:

- Über die Bestrafung der im Auslande begangenen Verbrechen (1819)
- System der Criminalrechtswissenschaft nebst einer Chrestomathie von Beweisstellen (1826)
- Untersuchungen aus dem Gebiete der Strafrechtswissenschaft (1830)
- Lehrbuch des gemeinen Criminalprocesses mit besonderer Berücksichtigung des preußischen Rechts (1833)
- Versuch einer Geschichte der Strafgesetzgebung und des Strafrechts der brandenburgisch-preußischen Lande (1835)
- Die verschiedenen Strafrechtstheorien in ihrem Verhältnisse zu einander und zu dem positiven Rechte und dessen Geschichte (1835)
- Lehrbuch der Strafrechtswissenschaft (1836)
- Beiträge zur Strafproceßgesetzgebung (1841)
- Versuch einer Geschichte der preußischen Civilgesetzgebung (1848)
- Betrachtungen über die Verordnung betreffend die Einführung des mündlichen und öffentlichen Verfahrens mit Geschworenen in Untersuchungssachen im Königreich Preußen (1849)
- Über das religiöse Element in der peinlichen Gerichtsordnung (1852)
- Die preußische Strafgesetzgebung und die Rechtsliteratur in ihrer gegenseitigen Beziehung (1854)
- Die Berechtigung der deutschen Strafrechtswissenschaft der Gegenwart (1859)
- Über die Verjährung rechtsmäßig anerkannter Strafen (1862)
- Über den organischen Zusammenhang einer auf den neueren Grundsätzen beruhenden Einrichtung des Strafverfahrens und der Gerichtsverfassung mit dem Strafrechte oder der Strafgesetzgebung (1863)
- Die Frage über den Zeitpunkt der Vereidigung der Zeugen im strafrechtlichen Verfahren (1864)
- Über die Bedeutung der sogennanten Criminalstatistik (1865)

Abegg was editor of the Archiv des Criminalrechts, Neue Ausgabe (1834 and following) and wrote articles and essays in several publications of the time.

Furthermore, he is known for his written critiques of legislative systems, which were always accompanied by a public discussion. Thereby he gained a fame as expert in legislative matters. These critiques are:

- Kritische Bemerkungen über Straf-Gesetz-Entww. von Württemberg (1836)
- Kritische Bemerkungen über Straf-Gesetz-Entww. von Baden (1839)
- Kritische Bemerkungen über Straf-Gesetz-Entww. von Preußen (1844, 1848, 1851)
- Kritische Bemerkungen über Straf-Gesetz-Entww. von Baiern (1854)
- Kritische Bemerkungen über Straf-Gesetz-Entww. von Sachsen (1837, 1853)
- Kritische Bemerkungen über Straf-Gesetz-Entww. von Norwegen (1835)
- Kritische Bemerkungen über Straf-Proceß-Entww. von Württemberg (1839)
- Kritische Bemerkungen über Straf-Proceß-Entww. für die preußischen Staaten (1852)
- Kritische Bemerkungen über Straf-Proceß-Entww. für den preußischen Staat (1865)

== Sources ==
- Allgemeine Deutsche Biographie - online version
