= Achim Gercke =

German politician (1902–1997)

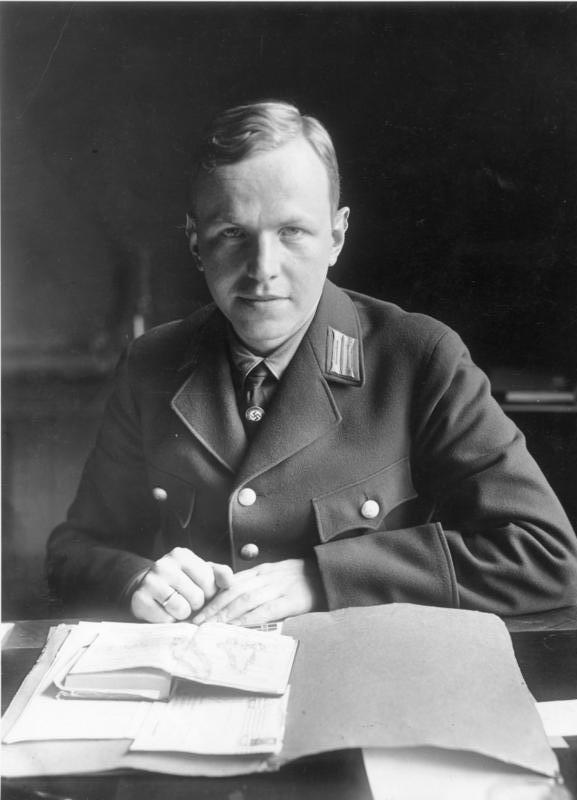
Achim Gercke in 1933

Achim Gercke (3 August 1902 – 27 October 1997) was a German politician.

Born in Greifswald, Gercke was the son of the classical philologist Alfred Gercke. After pursuing an academic career, he became a department head of the NSDAP in Munich on 1 January 1932. In April 1933 he was appointed to the Ministry of the Interior, where he served as an expert on racial matters. In November 1933, he was elected to the Reichstag from electoral constituency 2 (Berlin).

Gercke devised the system of "racial prophylaxis", forbidding the intermarriage between Jews and Aryans. As a student, he had attempted to develop a card index listing all Jews in Germany. His articles outlined Nazi policy on what to do to the Jews during the early phase of the Third Reich, which included expulsion from Germany. He described the just-enacted Nuremberg Laws restricting Jews as provisional measures, which indicated the direction future measures would take. Gercke argued for defining "Jew" as including any person with one-sixteenth Jewish blood. Later in 1942, the Wannsee Conference ultimately defined "Jew" quite differently: Persons having one Jewish grandparent were mostly excluded and even certain persons with two Jewish grandparents might be excluded, if they followed the Christian faith.

In 1932, Nazi Gauleiter Rudolf Jordan claimed that SS Security Chief Reinhard Heydrich was not a pure "Aryan". Within the Nazi organisation such innuendo could be damning, even for the head of the Reich's counterintelligence service. Gregor Strasser passed the allegations on to Achim Gercke who investigated Heydrich's genealogy. Gercke reported that Heydrich was "... of German origin and free from any coloured and Jewish blood". He insisted that the rumours were baseless. Even with this report, Heydrich privately engaged SD member Ernst Hoffman to further investigate and deny the rumours.

In April 1935, Gercke was dismissed from his offices and expelled from the Reichstag following allegations of homosexuality. After the war, he worked as an archivist and town clerk.

== Bibliography ==
- Gerwarth, Robert (2011). Hitler's Hangman: The Life of Heydrich. New Haven, CT: Yale University Press. ISBN 978-0-300-11575-8.
- Roseman, Mark (2003). The Wannsee Conference and the Final Solution: A Reconsideration. New York: Picador. ISBN 978-0-312-42234-9.
- Williams, Max (2001). Reinhard Heydrich: The Biography, Volume 1—Road To War. Church Stretton: Ulric Publishing. ISBN 978-0-9537577-5-6.
- The Order of the Death's Head, by Heinz Hoehne, pg. 161–162
- The Course of Modern Jewish History, by Howard M. Sachar pg. 517
- Das Reichssippenamt. Eine Institution nationalsozialistischer Rassenpolitik, by Diana Schulle
- The Nazi Ancestral Proof: Genealogy, Racial Science, and the Final Solution, by Eric Ehrenreich
