= Eduard Huschke =

German jurist (1801–1886)

Georg Philipp Eduard Huschke (26 June 1801 – 7 February 1886) was a German jurist and authority on church government.

He was born at Hannoversch Münden, a town in Lower Saxony, Germany. In 1817 Huschke went to Göttingen to study law. He was encouraged by Friedrich Carl von Savigny to go to Berlin, but returned to Göttingen and established himself as privatdozent, lecturing on the orations of Cicero, on Gaius and the history of law. Later he was appointed to a professorship in Rostock. In 1827 he accepted the position of professor of Roman law in Breslau.

Soon after his arrival in Breslau he became interested in the dissension caused by the Evangelical Union which were forced upon the orthodox Old Lutherans by the state rulers, and took a prominent part in the debates. Huschke tried to solve the problem practically as soon as he came to Breslau. This dispute led to the creation of the independent Lutheran Church, and Huschke, as the defender of its rights, was appointed head of the supreme church college.

Huschke was intensely hostile to the papacy, which he saw the realization of a demoniac power. He was an eager student of the apocalypse. The fruit of his studies was a work entitled Das Buch mit sieben Siegeln (Dresden, 1860). His ideas on church government were laid down in Die streitigen Lehren von der Kirche, dem Kirchenamt, dem Kirchenregiment und der Kirchenregierung (Leipzig, 1863). Huschke also published many important writings on law.

Huschke died at Breslau on 7 February 1886.
