= Frank Jewett (sailor) =

American sailor

Personal information
- Born: April 4, 1917 New York, New York, United States
- Died: June 28, 1986 (aged 69) Vineyard Haven, Massachusetts, United States

Sport
- Sport: Sailing

Frank Jewett (April 4, 1917 – June 28, 1986) was an American sailor. He competed in the O-Jolle event at the 1936 Summer Olympics. He graduated from California Institute of Technology and Harvard Business School.
