= Alfred Gercke =

German classical philologist (1860–1922)

Karl Friedrich August Alfred Gercke (20 March 1860 in Hannover – 26 January 1922 in Breslau) was a German classical philologist. He is known for his research pertaining to the history of Greek philosophy, in particular, Hellenistic philosophy, and for his studies involving Seneca the Younger.

== Academic career ==
He studied under Hermann Usener, Franz Bücheler and Reinhard Kekulé von Stradonitz at the University of Bonn (1880–83), and with Hermann Diels at the University of Berlin (1883–84). In 1886–88 he worked as an instructor at the Luisengymnasium in Berlin, and from 1890 to 1893, was a lecturer at the University of Göttingen. After serving as a provisional professor at Königsberg (1893–95), he became an associate professor at the University of Greifswald, where in 1898, he attained a full professorship (rector 1908/09). In 1909 he relocated to the University of Breslau, where he served as rector in 1920/21.

== Published works ==
He published editions of Chrysippus (from fragments) and Theophrastus, and contributed an article on Aristotle to the Pauly-Wissowa Realencyclopedie. In his investigations of Seneca, he provided the first scientific examination of "Quaestiones naturales" (1907).

With Eduard Norden, he published Einleitung in die Altertumswissenschaft (Introduction to Classical Studies); its first edition (1908/12, 3 volumes) had contributions made by academicians that included Franz Winter, Paul Kretschmer, Karl Julius Beloch, Ernst Bickel, Erich Bethe, Paul Wendland, Johan Ludvig Heiberg and Ernst Kornemann. Other principal works by Gercke are:

- Seneca-Studien. Leipzig, 1895 – Seneca studies.
- Studia Annaeana. Greifswald, 1900.
- Abriss der griechischen Lautlehre. Berlin, 1902 – Outline of Greek phonology.
- Griechische Literaturgeschichte mit Berücksichtigung der Geschichte der Wissenschaften. Leipzig, 1905 – Greek literary history with considerations involving the history of science.
- Die Entstehung der Aeneis. Berlin, 1913 – The emergence of the Aeneid.

== Family ==
His son was the Nazi official Achim Gercke.
