= Carl Ferdinand Friedrich Lehmann-Haupt =

German orientalist and historian

Carl Ferdinand Friedrich Lehmann-Haupt (11 March 1861, Hamburg – 24 July 1938, Innsbruck) was a German orientalist and historian. He specialized in Urartian research, and was co-author of Corpus Inscriptionum Chaldicarum, a corpus of Urartian inscriptions.

After receiving a degree in law at the University of Göttingen (1883), his focus turned to the history of ancient cultures — about which, he obtained a second doctorate from the University of Berlin (1886). Afterwards, he served as a research assistant in the Egyptology department at the Royal Museums of Berlin. In 1893 he obtained his habilitation and started work as a lecturer in ancient history. During his time spent at Berlin, his influences were Otto Hirschfeld, Friedrich Delitzsch and Theodor Mommsen.

In 1898/99 he took part on an expedition to Armenia, where he performed extensive studies of Urartian inscriptions. In 1901 he was named an associate professor of ancient history at the University of Berlin. He later travelled to England, where in 1911 he became a professor of Greek history at the University of Liverpool, followed by an appointment as a representative to the chair of ancient history at the University of Oxford (1913/14). In 1915/16 he was a professor of ancient history at the University of Constantinople. In 1918 he relocated to Innsbruck, where he taught classes until 1935.

In 1901 he became the first editor of Klio. Beiträge zur alten Geschichte, a journal of ancient history that he continued to edit until 1936.

== Selected works ==
- "De inscriptionibus cuneatis quae pertinent ad šamaš-šum-ukin regis Babyloniae regni initia", Berlin (dissertation), 1886.
- "Über protobabylonische Zahlwörter," in Zeitschrift für Assyriologie I, 222-228, 1886 – On Proto-Babylonian number words.
- Ein Siegel-Zylinder König Bur-Sin's von Isin. Beiträge zur Assyriologie und semitischen Sprachwissenschaft, II, 589-621, 1893 – Cylinder seal of King Bur-Sin.
- Materialien zur älteren geschichte Armeniens und Mesopotamiens, 1907 (with Max van Berchem) – Material for the early history of Armenia and Mesopotamia.
- Armenien einst und jetzt: Vom Kaukasus zum Tigris und nach Tigranokerta, 1910 – Armenia past and present, volume I: From the Caucasus to the Tigris and Tigranocerta.
- Die historische Semiramis und ihre Zeit. Vortrag der Deutschen Orientgesellschaft zu Berlin am 6. Februar 1910, mit 50 Abb., 76 Seiten, 1910 – The historic Semiramis and their era.
- Israel: seine Entwicklung im Rahmen der Weltgeschichte, 1911 – Israel: its development in the context of world history.
- "Das urartäisch-chaldische Herrscherhaus," in: Zeitschrift für Assyriologie XXXIII, 27-51, 1921. – The Urartian-Chaldean dynasty.
- "Corpus Inscriptionum Chaldicarum", Berlin: (with Felix Bagel and Fritz Schachermeyr), 1928 and 1935.
