= Alfred Hillebrandt =

German Sanskrit scholar

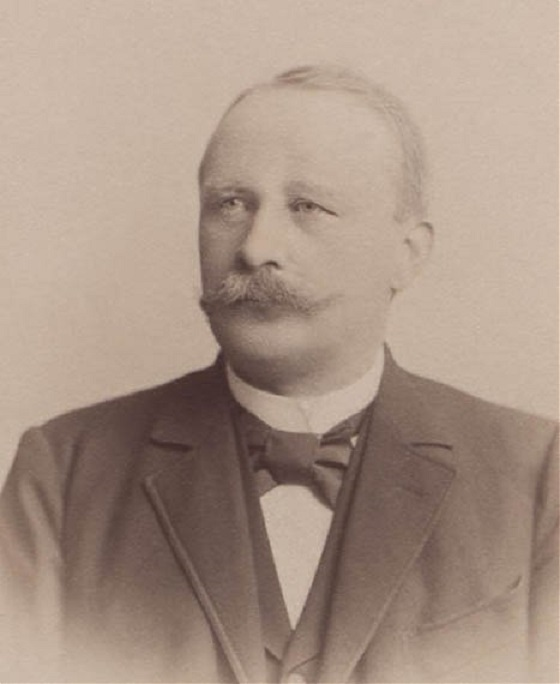
Alfred Hillebrandt

Alfred Hillebrandt (15 March 1853, in Groß Nädlitz – 18 October 1927, in Deutsch-Lissa) was a German Sanskrit scholar.

== Biography ==
He studied Sanskrit and comparative linguistics at the University of Breslau as a student of Adolf Friedrich Stenzler, then continued his studies at the Ludwig-Maximilians-Universität München under Martin Haug. In 1883, he became an associate professor at the University of Breslau, where in 1887 he attained a full professorship. On two separate occasions, he served there as university rector.

His specialty was Vedic mythology. "Varuna und Mitra, ein Beitrag Zur Exegese des Veda" (Breslau, 1877) was a prologue to his great work "Vedische Mythologie" (1891-1902), which was later translated into English and published as "Vedic mythology". Hillebrandt also wrote:

- Das altindische Neu- und Vollmondsopfer (The ancient Indian new and full moon sacrifices, 1880).
- Vedachrestomathie (Vedic chrestomathy, 1885).
- A section on religious antiquities in Georg Bühler's Grundriss der indo-arischen Philologie und Altertumskunde (1897).
- Alt-Indien, Kulturgeschichtliche Skizzen (Historical culture sketches of ancient India, 1899).
- Hillebrandt, alfred (1912). Mudrarakshasa Part-i.
