= 2015 World Match Racing Tour =

Event title
- Edition: 16th
- Dates: 8 May 2015 – 30 January 2016

Results
- Winner: (United Kingdom) Ian Williams

The 2015 World Match Racing Tour was a series of match racing sailing regattas staged during 2015–16 season.

Ian Williams won the tour, his sixth title, by defeating Taylor Canfield in the final of Monsoon Cup.

== Regattas ==
Dates	Regatta	City	Country	Equipment
8–11 May 2015	Ficker Cup	Long Beach	United States	
9–11 May 2015	Volvo Spring Cup	Långedrag	Sweden	
13–18 May 2015	Congressional Cup	Long Beach	United States	Catalina 37
21–25 May 2015	Match Race Germany	Langenargen	Germany	Bavaria 40
29–31 May 2015	Szczecin Match Race	Szczecin	Poland	
3–7 June 2015	Sails of White Nights	St Petersburg	Russia	
10–14 June 2015	Royal Southern Match Cup	Hamble	United Kingdom	
29 June – 4 July 2015	Stena Match Cup Sweden	Marstrand	Sweden	DS 37 Match Racer
17–19 July 2015	Dziwnow Match Race	Dziwnow	Poland	
28 July – 1 August 2015	Energa Sopot Match Race	Sopot	Poland	Diamant 3000
29 July – 1 August 2015	Internationaux de France	Pornichet	France	
5–9 August 2015	Knickerbocker Cup	New York City	United States	
13–16 August 2015	Oakcliff International	New York City	United States	
21–23 August 2015	Chicago Match Cup Grand Slam	Chicago	United States	
27–30 August 2015	Detroit Cup	Detroit	United States	
19–21 September 2015	Bermuda National Match Racing Championship	Hamilton	Bermuda	
6–11 October 2015	Argo Group Gold Cup	Hamilton	Bermuda	International One Design
20–22 November 2015	Monsoon Cup Terengganu	Terengganu	Malaysia	
18–20 December 2015	Liga Layar Malaysia	Johor Bahru	Malaysia	
26–30 January 2016	Monsoon Cup	Johor	Malaysia	Fareast 28R

== Standings ==
Pos	Skipper	Country	Tot
1	Ian Williams	Great Britain	142
2	Taylor Canfield	U.S. Virgin Islands	132
3	Björn Hansen	Sweden	130
4	Phil Robertson	New Zealand	100
5	Eric Monnin	Switzerland	96
6	Keith Swinton	Australia	96
7	Joachim Aschenbrenner	Denmark	92
8	Johnie Berntsson	Sweden	76
9	Reuben Corbett	New Zealand	76
10	Nicolai Sehested	Denmark	65
