= 2017 World Match Racing Tour =

Event title
- Edition: 18th
- Dates: 28 July 2016 – 8 October 2017

Results
- Winner: (Australia) Torvar Mirsky

The 2017 World Match Racing Tour was a series of match racing sailing regattas staged during 2017 season.

Torvar Mirsky won the finals and became 2017 World Champions.

== Regattas ==
Dates	Regatta	City	Country
28–30 July 2016	Energa Sopot Match Race	Sopot	Poland
19–21 September 2016	West Coast Cup	Hönö	Sweden
23–25 September 2017	Cape Crow Cup	Hönö	Sweden
23–25 January 2017	Swan River Match Cup	Perth	Australia
11–13 February 2017	Geographe Bay Cup	Busselton	Australia
16–18 March 2017	Perth Match Cup	Perth	Australia
20–25 March 2017	Match Cup Australia (Note: Championship event)	Perth	Australia
24–26 March 2017	Ficker Cup	Long Beach	United States
29 March – 2 April 2017	Congressional Cup	Long Beach	United States
11–13 April 2017	Miami Match Cup	Miami	United States
14–16 April 2017	Coconut Grove Cup	Miami	United States
12–14 May 2017	GKSS Spring Cup	Gothenburg	Sweden
26–28 May 2017	Croatia Match Cup	Poreč	Croatia
2–9 July 2017	Match Cup Sweden	Marstrand	Sweden
28–30 July 2017	St. Petersburg Match Cup	Saint Petersburg	Russia
1–6 August 2017	Match Cup Russia	Saint Petersburg	Russia
27 September – 1 October 2017	Chicago Match Cup	Chicago	United States
24–29 October 2017	Shenzhen Match Cup	Shenzhen	China

== Standings ==
Pos	Skipper	Country	ESMR	WCC	CCC	SRMC	GBC	PMC	MCA	FC	CC	MMC	CGC	GMC	CRO	MCS	SPMC	MCR	CMC	SMC	Tot
1	Phil Robertson	New Zealand	–	–	–	–	–	–	40	–	0	–	–	–	–	40	–	40	36	36	192
2	Ian Williams	Great Britain	–	–	–	–	–	–	0	–	40	–	–	–	–	33	–	33	40	20	166
3	Taylor Canfield	U.S. Virgin Islands	–	–	–	–	–	–	24	–	33	–	–	–	–	36	–	–	33	22	148
4	Yann Guichard	France	–	–	–	–	–	–	20	–	–	–	–	–	–	24	–	22	26	33	125
5	Chris Steele	New Zealand	–	–	–	–	–	–	26	–	20	–	–	–	–	22	–	–	24	30	122
6	Sam Gilmour	Australia	0	–	–	–	–	–	0	–	26	–	–	–	–	12	–	36	30	10	114
7	David Gilmour	Australia	–	8	0	–	10	–	30	–	–	–	–	–	–	26	–	–	20	24	110
8	Torvar Mirsky	Australia	9	–	0	0	8	–	33	–	–	–	–	9	–	15	–	–	–	40	106
9	Matt Jerwood	Australia	–	–	–	0	0	–	36	–	–	–	–	–	–	16	–	30	15	7	104
10	Pieter-Jan Postma	Netherlands	–	–	–	–	–	–	0	–	–	–	–	–	9	30	9	26	10	16	91
11	Nicklas Dackhammar	Sweden	0	–	0	–	–	–	16	–	–	–	–	–	–	20	–	15	22	15	88
12	Harry Price	Australia	–	–	–	4	0	–	–	0	15	10	0	–	–	13	–	–	8	26	72
13	Jonas Warrer	Denmark	–	–	–	–	–	–	15	–	–	–	–	0	6	–	–	20	14	12	67
14	Måns Holmberg	Sweden	–	10	0	0	7	–	13	–	–	–	–	10	5	*9	–	24	–	9	66
15	Steven Thomas	Australia	–	–	–	8	–	10	22	–	–	–	–	–	–	–	–	16	–	8	64
16	Johnie Berntsson	Sweden	–	–	–	–	–	–	–	–	36	–	–	–	–	11	–	–	–	14	61
17	Joachim Aschenbrenner	Denmark	6	–	0	–	–	–	–	–	22	–	–	7	8	–	–	–	–	13	56
18	Evan Walker	Australia	–	–	–	–	0	9	14	–	–	0	10	–	–	*8	–	–	16	–	49
19	Markus Edegran	United States	–	–	–	–	–	–	–	–	–	7	0	–	0	–	10	12	7	11	47
20	Nevin Snow	United States	–	–	–	–	–	–	–	0	–	9	9	–	–	14	–	–	9	–	41
21	Sally Barkow	United States	–	–	–	–	–	–	7	–	–	–	–	–	–	10	–	11	11	–	39
22	Scott Dickson	United States	–	–	–	–	–	–	–	10	24	–	–	–	–	–	–	–	–	–	34
23	Eric Monnin	Switzerland	7	–	–	–	–	–	–	–	16	–	–	–	–	7	–	–	–	–	30
24	Kim Kling	Sweden	–	4	0	–	–	–	–	–	–	–	–	6	–	–	7	13	–	–	30
25	Nicolai Sehested	Denmark	–	–	–	–	–	–	10	–	14	–	–	–	–	–	–	–	–	–	24
26	Quentin Delapierre	France	–	–	–	–	–	–	–	–	–	–	–	–	10	–	–	–	13	–	23
27	David Storrs	United States	–	–	–	–	–	–	–	9	13	–	–	–	–	–	–	–	–	–	22
28	Lukasz Wosinski	Poland	–	–	–	–	–	–	–	–	–	–	–	–	3	–	8	9	–	–	20
29	Victor Serezkhin	Russia	–	–	–	–	–	5	–	–	–	0	–	–	–	–	–	14	–	–	19
30	George Anyon	New Zealand	–	–	–	–	–	8	8	–	–	–	–	–	–	–	–	–	–	–	16
31	Patrik Sturesson	Sweden	–	7	–	–	–	–	–	–	–	–	–	8	–	–	–	–	–	–	15
32	Anthony Kotoun	U.S. Virgin Islands	–	–	–	–	–	–	–	–	–	6	8	–	–	–	–	–	–	–	14
32	Evgeny Neugodnikov	Russia	–	–	–	–	–	–	–	–	–	–	–	–	–	–	6	8	–	–	14
34	Hans Wallén	Sweden	–	5	8	–	–	–	–	–	–	–	–	–	–	–	–	–	–	–	13
35	Will Boulden	Australia	–	–	–	5	–	7	–	–	–	–	–	–	–	–	–	–	–	–	12
36	Andrew Campbell	United States	–	–	–	–	–	–	–	–	–	–	–	–	–	–	–	–	12	–	12
36	Evgeny Elfimov	Russia	–	–	–	–	–	–	–	–	–	–	–	–	–	–	5	7	–	–	12
36	Jeremy Wilmot	United States	–	–	–	–	–	–	–	–	–	5	7	–	–	–	–	–	–	–	12
39	Rasmus Rosengren	Sweden	–	6	–	–	–	–	–	–	–	–	–	5	–	–	–	–	–	–	11
40	Nico Dellenbaugh Karth	Austria	–	–	–	–	–	–	–	–	–	–	–	–	–	–	–	10	–	–	10
40	Pete Burling	New Zealand	–	–	–	10	–	–	–	–	–	–	–	–	–	–	–	–	–	–	10
42	Allan Nørregaard	Denmark	–	9	–	–	–	–	–	–	–	–	–	–	–	–	–	–	–	–	9
43	Daniel Björnholt	Denmark	–	–	–	–	–	–	–	–	–	3	5	–	–	–	–	–	–	–	8
44	Philip Bendon	Ireland	–	3	4	–	–	–	–	–	–	–	–	–	–	–	–	–	–	–	7
44	Šime Fantela	Croatia	–	–	–	–	–	–	–	–	–	–	–	–	7	–	–	–	–	–	7
46	Brett Burvill	Australia	–	–	–	–	–	6	–	–	–	–	–	–	–	–	–	–	–	–	6
46	Vladimir Lipavsky	Russia	–	–	–	–	–	–	–	6	–	–	–	–	–	–	–	–	–	–	6
48	Lachy Gilmour	Australia	–	–	–	–	5	–	–	–	–	–	–	–	–	–	–	–	–	–	5
49	Chris Rast	Switzerland	5	–	–	–	–	–	–	–	–	–	–	–	–	–	–	–	–	–	5
49	Peter Holz	United States	–	–	–	–	–	–	–	5	–	–	–	–	–	–	–	–	–	–	5
51	Chris Poole	United States	–	–	–	–	–	–	–	–	–	4	–	–	–	–	–	–	–	–	4
51	Dave Hood	United States	–	–	–	–	–	–	–	4	–	–	–	–	–	–	–	–	–	–	4
51	Ekaterina Kochkina	Russia	–	–	–	–	–	–	–	–	–	–	–	–	–	–	4	–	–	–	4
51	Jeremy Koo	Malaysia	–	–	–	0	–	4	–	–	–	–	–	–	–	–	–	–	–	–	4
51	Olivia Mackay	New Zealand	–	–	–	–	–	–	–	–	–	–	–	–	4	–	–	–	–	–	4
56	Gemma Jones	New Zealand	–	–	–	–	3	–	–	–	–	–	–	–	–	–	–	–	–	–	3
57	Anna Östling	Sweden	–	–	–	–	–	–	–	–	–	–	–	3	0	–	–	–	–	–	3
57	Jo Aleh	New Zealand	–	–	–	–	–	–	–	–	–	0	3	–	–	–	–	–	–	–	3
57	Matthew Chew	Australia	–	–	–	3	–	–	–	–	–	–	–	–	–	–	–	–	–	–	3
57	Robbie Gibbs	Australia	–	–	–	–	0	3	–	–	–	–	–	–	–	–	–	–	–	–	3
57	Sydney Gathrid	United States	–	–	–	–	–	–	–	3	–	–	–	–	–	–	–	–	–	–	3
62	Logan Beck	New Zealand	–	–	–	0	–	–	–	–	–	–	–	–	–	–	–	–	–	–	0
62	Will Dargaville	Australia	–	–	–	–	0	–	–	–	–	–	–	–	–	–	–	–	–	–	0

Source: wmrt.com/leaderboard/
