= Congressional Cup =

US annual match racing sailing competition

- First held: 1965
- Organizer: Long Beach Yacht Club
- Type: World Sailing grade 1 match racing event on the World Match Racing Tour
- Classes: Catalina 37
- Venue: Pacific Ocean off the Belmont Veteran's Memorial Pier in Long Beach, CA, United States
- Competitors: Top ranked match racing skippers from around the world
- Champion: Chris Poole (2024)
- Most titles: Taylor Canfield (5), Ian Williams (5) Peter Holmberg (4), Gavin Brady (4)
- Website: https://thecongressionalcup.com/

Congressional Cup is an annual match racing sailing competition and event on the World Match Racing Tour. It is sailed in Catalina 37 yachts.

== Winners ==
Year	Champion	Runner-up	Third place	Fourth place
1965	(United States) Gerry Driscoll	(United States) Willis Boyd	(United States) Robert Allen	(United States) Arthur Knapp Jr.
1966	(United States) Gerry Driscoll	(United States) Bill Ficker	(United States) Barney Flam	(United States) Harry Moloscho
1967	(United States) Scott Allan	(United States) Robert Bavier	(United States) Ted Turner	(United States) Arthur Knapp Jr.
1968	(United States) Skip Allan	(United States) Ted Turner	(United States) Bob Musbacher	(United States) Jake Wosser
1969	(United States) Henry Sprague	(United States) Buzz Boettcher	(United States) Burke Sawyer	(United States) Lowell North
1970	(United States) Argyle Campbell	(United States) Barney Flam	(United States) Buzz Boettcher	(United States) Ted Turner
1971	(United States) Tommy Pickard	(United States) John Jennings	(United States) Henry Schofield	(United States) Robert Burns
1972	(United States) Argyle Campbell	(United States) Dennis Conner	(United States) William Widnall	(United States) Doug Rastello
1973	(United States) Dennis Conner	(United States) Henry Schofield	(United States) Graham Hall	(United States) Tim Hogan
1974	(United States) Bill Ficker	(Australia) Hugh Treharne	(United States) Ted Turner	(United States) Tom Pickard
1975	(United States) Dennis Conner	(United States) Tony Parker	(United States) Graham Hall	(United States) Bill Buchan
1976	(United States) Dick Deaver	(United States) Tony Parker	(United States) Graham Hall	(United States) Ted Turner
1977	(United States) Ted Turner	(United States) Dick Deaver	(United States) Tony Parker	(United States) Ted Hood
1978	(United States) Dick Deaver	(United States) Scott Allan	(United States) Dennis Durgan	(United States) Ted Turner
1979	(United States) Dennis Durgan	(United States) Dick Deaver	(United States) Scott Allan	(United States) Henry Schofield
1980	(United States) Dennis Durgan	(United States) Rod Davis	(United States) Ted Turner	(United States) Dick Deaver
1981	(United States) Rod Davis	(United States) Dick Deaver	(United States) Russell Long	(Australia) James Hardy
1982	(United States) Scott Perry	(United States) Rod Davis	(United States) Dick Deaver	(Canada) Terry McLaughlin
1983	(United States) Dave Perry	(United States) Doug Rastello	(United States) John Kostecki	(United States) Dick Deaver
1984	(United States) Dave Perry	(United States) John Kostecki	(Republic of Ireland) Harold Cudmore	(United States) Dick Deaver
1985	(United States) Rod Davis	(United States) John Kolius	(United States) Dave Perry	(New Zealand) Chris Dickson
1986	(Republic of Ireland) Harold Cudmore	(United States) Dave Perry	(New Zealand) Chris Dickson	(United States) Dave Dellenbaugh
1987	(United Kingdom) Edward Owen	(United States) Peter Isler	(United States) John Shadden	(New Zealand) Chris Dickson
1988	(Australia) Peter Gilmour	(United States) John Bertrand	(United States) Bill Lynn	(United States) John Kolius
1989	(New Zealand) Rod Davis	(Australia) Peter Gilmour	(United States) Peter Isler	(United States) John Bertrand
1990	(New Zealand) Chris Dickson	(United States) Robbie Haines	(New Zealand) Russell Coutts	(United States) Peter Isler
1991	(New Zealand) Chris Dickson	(New Zealand) Russell Coutts	(New Zealand) Rod Davis	(Sweden) Olle Johansson
1992	(United States) Terry Hutchinson	(Spain) Pedro Campos	(France) Bertrand Pace	(United States) Robbie Haines
1993	(New Zealand) Rod Davis	(United States) Steve Grillon	(United States) JJ Isler	(United States) Terry Hutchinson
1994	(United Kingdom) Chris Law	(New Zealand) Rod Davis	(United States) Mike Elias	(United States) Mark Golison
1995	(Republic of Ireland) Harold Cudmore	(United States) Dave Perry	(United States) Henry Sprague	(United States) Scott Allan
1996	(New Zealand) Gavin Brady	(United States) Scott Dickson	(United States Virgin Islands) Peter Holmberg	(United States) JJ Isler
1997	(New Zealand) Gavin Brady	(United States) Paul Cayard	(United States) Scott Dickson	(United States Virgin Islands) Peter Holmberg
1998	(United States Virgin Islands) Peter Holmberg	(Italy) Francesco De Angelis	(United Kingdom) Andy Green	(Sweden) Magnus Holmburg
1999	(United States Virgin Islands) Peter Holmberg	(United States) Betsy Allison	(United States) Gavin Brady	(United States) Scott Dickson
2000	(New Zealand) Dean Barker	(United States) Scott Dickson	(United States Virgin Islands) Peter Holmberg	(France) Luc Pillot
2001	(United States Virgin Islands) Peter Holmberg	(United States) Rod Davis	(Australia) Sebastien Destremau	(United Kingdom) Andy Green
2002	(United States Virgin Islands) Peter Holmberg	(United States) Ed Baird	(United States) Rod Davis	(Australia) Sebastien Destremau
2003	(United States) Ken Read	(United States) Gavin Brady	(United States) James Spithill	(Italy) Paolo Cian
2004	(United States) Ed Baird	(United States) Terry Hutchinson	(United States) Gavin Brady	(Australia) Peter Gilmour
2005	(New Zealand) Dean Barker	(New Zealand) Russell Coutts	(United States) Chris Dickson	(France) Mathieu Richard
2006	(New Zealand) Gavin Brady	(United Kingdom) Ian Williams	(France) Mathieu Richard	(United States) Scott Dickson
2007	(France) Mathieu Richard	(Sweden) Johnie Berntsson	(France) Damien Iehl	(New Zealand) Simon Minoprio
2008	(New Zealand) Gavin Brady	(Sweden) Johnie Berntsson	(France) Philippe Presti	(United States) Scott Dickson
2009	(Sweden) Johnie Berntsson	(Italy) Francesco Bruni	(United States) Terry Hutchinson	(France) Mathieu Richard
2010	(Italy) Francesco Bruni	(United States) Gavin Brady	(Sweden) Johnie Berntsson	(United States) Bill Hardesty
2011	(United Kingdom) Ian Williams	(Italy) Francesco Bruni	(France) Mathieu Richard	(Finland) Staffan Lindberg
2012	(United Kingdom) Ian Williams	(United States) Gavin Brady	(Italy) Simone Ferrarese	(United States Virgin Islands) Taylor Canfield
2013	(Italy) Simone Ferrarese	(United States) Ed Baird	(United Kingdom) Ian Williams	(France) Mathieu Richard
2014	(United States Virgin Islands) Taylor Canfield	(United Kingdom) Ian Williams	(Italy) Francesco Bruni	(Australia) Keith Swinton
2015	(United States Virgin Islands) Taylor Canfield	(New Zealand) Phil Robertson	(United Kingdom) Ian Williams	(Sweden) Björn Hansen
2016	(United States Virgin Islands) Taylor Canfield	(Denmark) Nicolai Sehested	(Australia) Sam Gilmour	(United States) Scott Dickson
2017	(United Kingdom) Ian Williams	(Sweden) Johnie Berntsson	(United States Virgin Islands) Taylor Canfield	(New Zealand) Phil Robertson
2018	(United States Virgin Islands) Taylor Canfield	(United States) Dean Barker	(Australia) Sam Gilmour	(Sweden) Johnie Berntsson
2019	(United Kingdom) Ian Williams	(United States) Scott Dickson	(Sweden) Johnie Berntsson	(United States Virgin Islands) Taylor Canfield
2020	No race			
2021	(United States Virgin Islands) Taylor Canfield	(Sweden) Johnie Berntsson	(Switzerland) Eric Monin	(United States) Chris Poole
2022	(United Kingdom) Ian Williams	(United States Virgin Islands) Taylor Canfield	(United States) Chris Poole	(Sweden) Johnie Berntsson
2023	(United States) Chris Poole	(Denmark) Jeppe Borch	(New Zealand) Nick Egnot-Johnson	(United Kingdom) Ian Williams
2024	(United States) Chris Poole	(United Kingdom) Ian Williams	(Switzerland) Eric Monin	(New Zealand) Nick Egnot-Johnson
