= 2015 in sailing =

The following were the scheduled events of sailing for the year 2015 throughout the world.

== Events ==
=== Olympic classes events ===
==== World championships ====
- 2.4 Metre World Championship
- 5.5 Metre World Championship
- 29er World Championship
- 49er World Championship
- 17–22 November: 49er & 49er FX World Championships in Buenos Aires, Argentina
- 420 World Championships
- 10–17 October: 470 World Championships in Haifa, Israel
- 505 World Championship
- Contender World Championship
- Europe World Championships
- Formula 18 World Championship
- 20–30 November: Finn Gold Cup in Takapuna, New Zealand
- 3–11 July: Nacra 17 World Championship in Aarhus, Denmark
- 17–24 October: RS:X World Championships in Al-Musannah, Oman
  - Men's RS:X
    - (gold) : Pierre Le Coq (FRA)
    - (silver) : Wang Aichen (CHN)
    - (bronze) : Dorian van Rijsselberge (NED)
  - Women's RS:X
    - (gold) : Chen Peina (CHN)
    - (silver) : Bryony Shaw (GBR)
    - (bronze) : Lilian de Geus (NED)
- Star World Championship

==== Sailing World Cup ====
- 7 December 2014 – 1 November 2015: 2015 ISAF Sailing World Cup
  - 24–31 January: ISAF Sailing World Cup Miami in Miami, United States
  - 20–26 April: ISAF Sailing World Cup Hyères in Hyères, France
  - 8–14 June: ISAF Sailing World Cup Weymouth in Weymouth, United Kingdom
  - 14–20 September: ISAF Sailing World Cup Qingdao in Qingdao, China
  - 27 October – 1 November: ISAF Sailing World Cup Final in Abu Dhabi, United Arab Emirates
- 7 December 2015 – 11 December 2016: 2016 ISAF Sailing World Cup
  - 7–13 December: Sailing World Cup Melbourne in Melbourne, Australia

==== African championships ====
- 4–11 December: Laser African Championship & RS:X African Championships in Algiers, Algeria

==== Asian championships ====
- 26 September – 4 October: RS:X Asian Championships in Enoshima, Japan
- 16–19 March: 49er & 49er FX African & Asian Championships in Abu Dhabi, United Arab Emirates

==== European championships ====
- 8–17 May: Finn European Championship in Split, Croatia
- 20–26 June: RS:X European Championships in Mondello, Italy
- 27 June – 4 July: 470 European Championships in Aarhus, Denmark
- 6–12 July: 49er & 49er FX European Championships in Porto, Portugal
- 26 September – 3 October: Nacra 17 European Championship in Barcelona, Spain

==== North American championships ====
- 17–19 January: 470 North American Championships in Coconut Grove, United States
- 5–8 February: Nacra 17 North American Championship in Clearwater, United States
- 6–9 February: 49er & 49er FX North American Championships in Clearwater, United States
- 29 July – 2 August: Laser North American Championship in North Carolina, United States
- 9–13 August: RS:X North American Championships in Kingston, Canada
- 15–18 August: Finn North American Championship in Kingston, Canada

==== South American championships ====
- 3–6 August: 470 South American Championship in Rio de Janeiro, Brazil
- 5–8 November: 49er & 49er FX South American Championships in Buenos Aires, Argentina
- 3–8 December: RS:X South American Championships in Pisco, Peru

=== Other major events ===
==== America's Cup ====
- 25 July 2015 – 20 November 2016: 2015–16 America's Cup World Series
  - 25 & 26 July 2015: Portsmouth, United Kingdom
  - 29 & 30 August 2015: Gothenburg, Sweden
  - 17 & 18 October 2015: Hamilton, Bermuda

==== Extreme Sailing Series ====
- 5 February – 13 December: 2015 Extreme Sailing Series
  - 5–8 February: Act #1 in Singapore, Singapore
  - 11–14 March: Act #2 in Muscat, Oman
  - 30 April – 3 May: Act #3 in Qingdao, China
  - 18–21 June: Act #4 in Cardiff, United Kingdom
  - 23–26 July: Act #5 in Hamburg, Germany
  - 20–23 August: Act #6 in Saint Petersburg, Russia
  - 1–4 October: Act #7 in Istanbul, Turkey
  - 10–13 December: Act #8 in Sydney, Australia

==== Volvo Ocean Race ====
- 4 October 2014 – 27 June 2015: 2014–15 Volvo Ocean Race
  - 2 January: In-Port Race in Abu Dhabi, United Arab Emirates
  - 3 January: Leg #3 from Abu Dhabi, United Arab Emirates to Sanya, China
  - 7 February: In-Port Race in Sanya, China
  - 8 February: Leg #4 from Sanya, China to Auckland, New Zealand
  - 14 March: In-Port Race in Auckland, New Zealand
  - 15 March: Leg #5 from Auckland, New Zealand to Itajai, Brazil
  - 18 April: In-Port Race in Itajai, Brazil
  - 19 April: Leg #6 from Itajai, Brazil to Newport, United States
  - 16 May: In-Port Race in Newport, United States
  - 17 May: Leg #7 from Newport, United States to Lisbon, Portugal
  - 6 June: In-Port Race in Lisbon, Portugal
  - 7 June: Leg #8 from Lisbon, Portugal to Lorient, France
  - 14 June: In-Port Race in Lorient, France
  - 17 June: Leg #9 from Lisbon, Portugal to Gothenburg, Sweden
  - 27 June: In-Port Race in Gothenburg, Sweden

==== World Match Racing Tour ====
- 10–14 February: Monsoon Cup in Kuala Terengganu, Malaysia
- 8 May 2015 – 30 January 2016: 2015 World Match Racing Tour
  - 21–25 May: Match Race Germany in Langenargen, Germany
  - 29 July – 1 August: Sopot Match Race in Sopot, Poland
  - 6–11 October: Argo Group Gold Cup in Hamilton, Bermuda

=== Other classes ===
==== World championships ====
- 4–12 June: Dragon World Championship in La Rochelle, France
- 29 June – 4 July: IFCA Funboard Slalom Youth & Masters World Championships in Reggio Calabria, Italy
- 11–18 July: RS:X Youth World Championships in Gdynia, Poland
- 17–25 July: 420 World Championships in Karatsu, Japan
- 24–31 July: 470 Junior World Championships in Thessalonki, Greece
- 2–6 August: RS100 World Championship in Aquavitesse, Netherlands
- 2–7 August: Zoom 8 World Championships in Saaremaa, Estonia
- 6–14 August: Laser 4.7 Youth World Championships in Medemblik, Netherlands
- 6–12 September: IFCA Funboard Freestyle World Championships in Hvide Sande, Denmark
- 9–13 September: Team Racing 420 World Championships in Campione del Garda, Italy
- 12–18 September: Swan 45 World Championship in Porto Cervo, Italy
- 15–18 September: Snipe Junior World Championship in Talamone, Italy
- 24–31 October: Techno 293 World Championships in Cagliari, Italy
- 1–8 November: Star World Championship in San Isidro, Argentina
- 27 December – 3 January 2016: ISAF Youth Sailing World Championships in Langkawi, Malaysia

==== African championships ====
- 3–12 September: Optimist African Championship in Algiers, Algeria

==== European championships ====
- 23 May – 25 May: RS Feva European Championship in Campione del Garda, Italy
- 31 May – 7 June: Flying Dutchman European Championship in Croatia
- 2–7 June: Star European Championship in Gaeta, Italy
- 3–7 June: European Match Racing Championship in Saint Petersburg, Russia
- 8–14 June: J/24 European Championship in Ängelholm, Sweden
- 11–15 June: Tornado European Championship in Lake Lipno, Czech Republic
- 20–26 June: RS:X Youth European Championship in Mondello, Italy
- 23–28 June: IKA European Championship in Bozcaada, Turkey
- 27 June – 3 July: ISWC Speed Windsurfing European Championship in Fuerteventura, Spain
- 16–26 July: Optimist European Championship in Pwllheli, United Kingdom
- 23 July – 2 August: Hobie 16 European Championship in Campione del Garda, Italy
- 31 July – 8 August: Dragon European Championship in Båstad, Sweden
- 7–15 August: 420 European Junior Championships in Bourgas, Bulgaria
- 22 August – 30 August: Moth European Championship in Lelystad, Netherlands
- 7–12 September: EUROSAF Disabled Sailing European Championship in Iberdrola, Spain
- 12–17 October: J/70 European Championship in Monaco, Monaco
- 12–19 September: Flying Dutchman European Championship in Umag, Croatia
- 12–19 September: Soling European Championship in Berlin, Germany

==== North American championships ====
- 3–5 July: Snipe North American Championship in Guelph, Canada
- 1–6 September: Star North American Championship in Puget Sound, United States
- 23–27 September: J/70 North American Championship in San Diego, United States

==== South American championships ====
- 27 March – 5 April: Snipe South American Championship in Mar del Plata, Argentina
- 31 October – 2 November: Star South American Championship in Buenos Aires, Argentina

=== Other events ===
- 26–30 May: Delta Lloyd Regatta in Medemblik, Netherlands
- 20–28 June: Kiel Week in Kiel, Germany
- 16–18 August: Fastnet Race from Cowes, United Kingdom to Plymouth, United Kingdom
- 5–10 October: Semaine Olympique Française in La Rochelle, France
