= Energa Sopot Match Race =

- First held: 2004
- Type: match racing event on the World Match Racing Tour
- Classes: Diamant 3000
- Venue: Sopot, Poland
- Champion: Nicolai Sehested (2015)
- Most titles: Pierre-Antoine Morvan, Przemyslaw Tarnacki, Ian Williams (2)
- Website: energasopotmatchrace.com

Energa Sopot Match Race is an annual match racing sailing competition and event on the World Match Racing Tour. It is sailed in Diamant 3000 yachts.

== Winners ==
Year	Champion	Runner-up	Third place	Fourth place
2004	(Sweden) Staffan Lindberg			
2005	(United Kingdom) Ian Williams			
2006	(Russia) Eugneyi Neugodnikov			
2007	(Denmark) Peter Wibroe			
2008	(New Zealand) Adam Minoprio			
2009	(Poland) Przemyslaw Tarnacki			
2010	(Switzerland) Eric Monnin			
2011	(France) Pierre-Antoine Morvan			
2012	(France) Pierre-Antoine Morvan			
2013	(Poland) Przemyslaw Tarnacki			
2014	(United Kingdom) Ian Williams			
2015	(Denmark) Nicolai Sehested	(United Kingdom) Ian Williams	(Poland) Karol Jablonski	(Sweden) Björn Hansen
