= Argo Group =

Bermuda-based insurance underwriter

Argo Group International Holdings, Inc
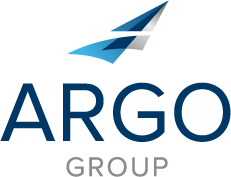
- Type: Public
- Traded as: NYSE: ARGO (2018-23)
- Industry: Insurance
- Founded: August 1948; 78 years ago
- Headquarters: 501 7th Avenue, 7th Floor; New York, NY 10018
- Key people: Jessica (Snyder) Buss (President & CEO)
- Revenue: ▼US$ 1.89 billion (2020)
- Operating income: ▲US$ 22.3 million (2020)
- Net income: ▼US$ 71.9 million (2020)
- Total assets: ▼US$ 10.47 billion (2020)
- Total equity: ▲US$ 1.86 billion (2020)
- Owner: Brookfield Reinsurance (2023–present)
- Number of employees: 1,515 (2020)
- Website: www.argogroup.com

Argo Group International Holdings, Inc, or Argo Group (NYSE: ARGO/PA; NYSE: ARGD), is a U.S.-based underwriter of specialty insurance products in the property and casualty market.

It and its insurance subsidiaries are rated "A−" by Standard & Poor's. Argo's insurance subsidiaries are rated "A−" by AM Best. In 2017, the San Antonio Express-News wrote that "the company has made more than $1 billion in profit over the last decade as a mid-sized player in a niche field insuring complex or hard-to-price risks other insurers won’t touch." It was listed on the New York Stock Exchange in May 2018.

On November 16, 2023, the firm was acquired by Brookfield Reinsurance for approximately $1.1 billion.

== History ==
=== Origin ===
Argonaut Insurance was founded in California in 1948 as the Argonaut Insurance Exchange. It focused on underwriting workers compensation for the California construction industry. It was acquired in 1969 by Teledyne Technologies, then expanded into additional product lines and acquired Great Central Insurance.

=== 1986–2000 ===
In September 1986, Teledyne Technologies formed and then spun off Argonaut Group, with Argonaut Insurance and Great Central Insurance parts of the new company. It focused on underwriting large-account workers compensation policies.

=== 2000–present ===
In January 2000, Mark E. Watson III, a board member since 1999, became President and CEO. The company moved its corporate office to San Antonio, Texas, in 2001.

The firm acquired Front Royal, Inc. (along with its subsidiaries Colony and Rockwood), an insurance holding company headquartered in Morrisville, North Carolina, for $165 million in cash. The acquisition added products and underwriting capabilities in areas complementary to Argonaut’s previous products. Then they entered the public entity market by founding Trident Insurance. In 2002, they acquired Fulcrum, an excess and surplus lines underwriter from Scor. In 2003 they acquired Grocers from Royal & Sun Alliance USA, expanding their Great Central platform. In 2005 they acquired the renewal rights to business formerly written by Interstate Insurance Group, subsidiaries of Fireman’s Fund. In May 2005 they created Argonaut Specialty to underwrite accounts larger than what Colony traditionally wrote. In 2007 they merged with Bermuda-based PXRE, entering the reinsurance market.

The new company renamed as Argo Group International Holdings, Ltd., and moved its public company home office to Bermuda, which offered a more favorable tax structure than the United States.

In 2008, Trident Insurance Services acquired Massamont Insurance Agency, which specialized in insurance programs for public entities, expanding Argo's public entity footprint into New England with offices in Greenfield and Boston, Mass. In April 2008, Argonaut Group re-branded as Argo Group. U.S. operations were packaged as Argo Group US. Peleus Re was renamed Argo Re. In Europe, it became known as Argo Solutions. In May, Argo Group acquired Heritage and its Lloyd’s syndicate for $272 million in order to create a broader underwriting platform with extended geographic capability.

Argo Group also entered the surety insurance market in 2008 by launching Argo Surety as part of the commercial specialty unit for projects such as construction of schools, hospitals, roads, and other types of infrastructure.

In September 2008, they acquired Insight Insurance, a specialist in professional liability insurance for accounting professionals, architects, engineers and insurance agents. In October, they established Argo Pro, a consolidation of their professional liability operations.

In 2010, the company paid out $25 million in claims to everyone present at the Deepwater Horizon oil spill in the Gulf of Mexico. In 2012, Argo Seguros, which specializes in property and casualty underwriting, opened in São Paulo, Brazil. Products include domestic and international transport insurance, general liability policies and liability coverage for managers and professionals with a focus on SMEs.

Argo also insures concerts and other major events, including event cancelation coverage for the Irish rock band U2. In 2017, the company paid a claim to Disney, who had bought insurance against the possibility that actress Carrie Fisher would die before filming Star Wars: The Rise of Skywalker.

In 2018, Argo moved the listing of its shares from the NASDAQ to the New York Stock Exchange, and its ticker symbol changed from AGII to ARGO. On May 7, 2018, CEO Mark Watson III rang the opening bell of the NYSE.

In 2019, the company announced the retirement CEO Mark Watson III from Argo Group. Following the announcement, Argo Group’s board of directors named CFO Kevin Rehnberg interim CEO.

In February 2020, Argo Group named Kevin J. Rehnberg as chief executive officer.

In June 2022, Argo Group appointed Thomas A. Bradley, who had served as Argo’s chairman since 2020, and who had been serving as interim chief executive officer (“CEO”) since March 2022, as CEO, effective immediately.

In August 2023, following the completion of Brookfield Re's acquisition of Argo Group, Jessica (Snyder) Buss was named as CEO, replacing Thomas Bradley.

== Business ==
Argo Group is a U.S.-focused underwriter of specialty insurance products in the property and casualty market. The company offers a full line of products and services designed to meet the unique coverage and claims-handling needs of businesses.

=== U.S. Coverage Highlights ===
Inside the U.S., Argo delivers custom insurance products and services through a broad distribution platform.

=== International Coverage Highlights ===
Through its Lloyd’s Syndicate 1200 platform, ArgoGlobal is focused on U.S. non-admitted and global specialty risks and reinsurance to close (RITC) transactions. Brokers may also access ArgoGlobal underwriters at Lloyd’s offices in Brazil and Dubai.

Argo Insurance’s excess casualty, property and professional lines provide access to non-Lloyd’s intermediaries outside the U.S.

In February 2023, Argo Group completed the sale of Argo Underwriting Agency Limited and its Lloyd’s Syndicate 1200 (ArgoGlobal) to Westfield for total cash proceeds of approximately $125 million.

== Philanthropy ==
Argo Group's corporate giving contributions are primarily guided by employees and occasionally companywide at the group level. The company works with organizations inside and outside the insurance industry on critical initiatives such as diversity and inclusion, scholarships, the environment and sustainability, the Insurance Careers movement and CAT/disaster relief.

=== Team Argo ===
A volunteer program allows Argo employees to donate their time to non-profit organizations and participate each year in local fundraising events. Additionally, Argo's Volunteer Time Off policy provides each employee with one day (eight hours) of paid time off each year to volunteer.

=== Community Relations Committees ===
Argo's Community Relations Committees are employee-led groups that have a voice in what Argo supports, while promoting giving back across the enterprise. Committees are established in Bermuda; New York; Chicago; Richmond, Virginia; and San Antonio.

== Argo Group Gold Cup ==

Argo Group was a title sponsor (from 2008 to 2020) for the King Edward VII Gold Cup, an Alpari Group World Match Racing Tour held in Hamilton Harbour, Bermuda every October. The race is hosted by the Royal Bermuda Yacht Club racing to earn points towards the ISAF Match Racing World Championship.
