= Alpari (disambiguation) =

Alpari may refer to:

- Alpari (UK) Limited a global foreign exchange (FX, Forex), precious metals and CFD broker
- Alpari World Match Racing Tour, a professional sailing series sanctioned by the International Sailing Federation
- Gyula Alpári a Hungarian Communist politician and propagandist
