= King Edward VII Gold Cup =

- First held: 1937
- Type: match racing event on the World Match Racing Tour
- Classes: International One Design
- Venue: Hamilton, Bermuda
- Champion: Adam Minoprio (2015)
- Most titles: Russell Coutts (8)
- Website: argogroupgoldcup.com

King Edward VII Gold Cup (for sponsorship reasons referred to as Argo Group Gold Cup) is an annual match racing sailing competition and event on the World Match Racing Tour. It is sailed in International One Design yachts.

== Winners ==
Year	Champion	Runner-up	Third place	Fourth place
1937	(United States) Briggs Cunningham			
1938	(Bermuda) Bill Miller			
1939	(Bermuda) A. F. Darrell			
1940				
1941				
1942				
1943				
1944				
1945				
1946				
1947				
1948				
1949				
1950				
1951	(United States) Ray Hunt			
1952	(Bermuda) A. F. Darrell			
1953	(Bermuda) A. F. Darrell			
1954	(Bermuda) A. F. Darrell			
1955	(Bermuda) E. Roddy Williams			
1956	(Bermuda) A. F Darrell			
1957	(United States) Warner Wilcox			
1958	(United States) Warner Wilcox			
1959	(Bermuda) A. F. Darrell			
1960	(Bermuda) Warren Brown			
1961	(Bermuda) Hugh Masters			
1962	(United States) Robert Waterburg			
1963	(United States) Philip Dollins			
1964	(United States) Cornelius Shields, Jr.			
1965	(United States) Rene Coudert			
1966	(Bermuda) Warren Brown			
1967	(United States) Rene Coudert			
1968	(Bermuda) Peter Richold			
1969	(Bermuda) C. Archie Hooper			
1970	(Bermuda) W. Keith Hollis			
1971	(United States) Dayton T. Carr			
1972	(Bermuda) C. Archie Hooper			
1973	(Bermuda) C. Archie Hooper			
1974	(Bermuda) John Hartley Watlington			
1975	(Bermuda) C. Archie Hooper			
1976	(Bermuda) C. Archie Hooper			
1977	(Bermuda) B.W. Walker			
1978	(United States) William S. Widnall			
1979	(United States) William S. Widnall			
1980	(Bermuda) E. S. Simmons			
1981	(United States) William S. Widnall			
1982	(United States) William S. Widnall			
1983	(United States) William S. Widnall			
1985	(United States) Peter Isler			
1986	(Australia) Gordon Lucas			
1987	(New Zealand) Chris Dickson			
1988	(United States) John Kolius			
1989	(New Zealand) Chris Dickson			
1990	(New Zealand) Russell Coutts			
1991	(United Kingdom) Eddie Warden-Owen			
1992	(New Zealand) Russell Coutts			
1993	(New Zealand) Russell Coutts			
1994	(New Zealand) Rod Davis			
1995	(Australia) Peter Gilmour			
1996	(New Zealand) Russell Coutts			
1997	(Australia) Peter Gilmour			
1998	(New Zealand) Russell Coutts			
1999	(United Kingdom) Andy Green			
2000	(New Zealand) Russell Coutts			
2001	(United States Virgin Islands) Peter Holmberg			
2002	(Denmark) Jesper Radich			
2003	(Australia) Peter Gilmour			
2004	(New Zealand) Russell Coutts			
2005	(Australia) James Spithill			
2006	(United Kingdom) Ian Williams			
2007	(France) Mathieu Richard	(Sweden) Björn Hansen	(United States) Ed Baird	(Bermuda) Blythe Walker
2008	(Sweden) Johnie Berntsson	(New Zealand) Adam Minoprio	(United Kingdom) Ben Ainslie	(Sweden) Mattias Rahm
2009	(United Kingdom) Ben Ainslie	(New Zealand) Adam Minoprio	(United Kingdom) Ian Williams	(Switzerland) Eric Monnin
2010	(United Kingdom) Ben Ainslie	(Denmark) Jesper Radich	(Sweden) Johnie Berntsson	(Switzerland) Eric Monnin
2011	(Australia) Torvar Mirsky	(Sweden) Johnie Berntsson	(Italy) Francesco Bruni	(New Zealand) Phil Robertson
2012	(United States Virgin Islands) Taylor Canfield	(Sweden) Johnie Berntsson	(United Kingdom) Ian Williams	(Switzerland) Eric Monnin
2013	(Italy) Francesco Bruni	(United Kingdom) Ben Ainslie	(United States Virgin Islands) Taylor Canfield	(New Zealand) Adam Minoprio
2014	(Sweden) Johnie Berntsson	(Switzerland) Eric Monnin	(United States Virgin Islands) Taylor Canfield	(United Kingdom) Ian Williams
2015	(New Zealand) Adam Minoprio	(Australia) Keith Swinton	(Sweden) Björn Hansen	(United States Virgin Islands) Taylor Canfield
