= 2014 in sailing =

The following were the scheduled events of sailing for the year 2014 throughout the world.

== Events ==
=== Olympic classes events ===
==== World championships ====
- 8–21 September: 2014 ISAF Sailing World Championships in Santander, Spain

==== Sailing World Cup ====
- 12 October 2013 – 30 November 2014: 2013–14 ISAF Sailing World Cup
  - 25 January – 1 February: ISAF Sailing World Cup Miami in Miami, United States
  - 29 March – 5 April: ISAF Sailing World Cup Mallorca in Palma, Spain
  - 19–26 April: ISAF Sailing World Cup Hyères in Hyères, France
- 14 October – 30 November: 2014 ISAF Sailing World Cup
  - 14–18 October: ISAF Sailing World Cup Qingdao in Qingdao, China
  - 26–30 November: ISAF Sailing World Cup Final in Abu Dhabi, United Arab Emirates
- 7 December 2014 – 1 November 2015: 2015 ISAF Sailing World Cup
  - 7–14 December: ISAF Sailing World Cup Melbourne in Melbourne, Australia

==== African championships ====
- 28 December 2014 – 4 January 2015: RS:X African Championships in Béjaïa, Algeria

==== European championships ====
- 2–10 May: Finn European Championship in La Rochelle, France
- 7–14 June: Laser European Championships in, Croatia
- 28 June – 5 July: RS:X European Championships in Alaçatı, Turkey
- 4–12 July: Nacra 17 European Championship in La Grande-Motte, France
- 8–13 July: 49er & 49er FX European Championships in Helsinki, Finland
- 8–15 July: 470 European Championships in Athens, Greece

==== North American championships ====
- 18–20 January: 470 North American Championships in Miami, United States
- 18–20 January: 49er & 49er FX North American Championships in Miami, United States
- 20–22 February: RS:X North American Championships in Cancún, Mexico
- 16–18 May: Finn North American Championship in Alamitos Bay, United States
- 12–15 June: Laser North American Championship in Alamitos Bay, United States

==== South American championships ====
- 30 July – 1 August: 470 South American Championship in Rio de Janeiro, Brazil
- 5–8 November: 49er & 49er FX South American Championships in Rio de Janeiro, Brazil
- 3–7 December: RS:X South American Championships in Buenos Aires, Argentina
- 8–11 December: Nacra 17 South American Championship in Rio de Janeiro, Brazil

=== Other major events ===
==== Extreme Sailing Series ====
- 20 February – 14 December: 2014 Extreme Sailing Series
  - 20–23 February: Act #1 in Singapore, Singapore
  - 19–22 March: Act #2 in Muscat, Oman
  - 1–4 May: Act #3 in Qingdao, China
  - 26–29 June: Act #4 in Saint Petersburg, Russia
  - 22–25 June: Act #5 in Cardiff, United Kingdom
  - 10–14 September: Act #6 in Istanbul, Turkey
  - 2–5 October: Act #7 in Nice, France
  - 11–14 December: Act #8 in Sydney, Australia

==== PWA World Tour ====
- 27 May – 1 June: PWA World Cup – Catalunya Costa Brava in Costa Brava, Spain
- 20–24 June: PWA World Cup Bonaire – Freestyle in Bonaire, Netherlands Antilles
- 1–6 July: Awaza PWA World Cup Turkmenistan – Slalom in Turkmenistan
- 14–20 July: PWA World Cup Gran Canaria – Wave in Gran Canaria, Spain
- 25 July – 2 August: PWA World Cup Fuerteventura – Freestyle and Slalom in Fuerteventura, Spain
- 4–10 August: PWA World Cup Tenerife – Wave in Tenerife, Spain
- 26–31 August: Pegasus Airlines Alaçatı PWA World Cup – Slalom in Alaçatı, Turkey
- 26 September – 5 October: Davidoff Cool Water Windsurf World Cup Sylt in Sylt, Germany

==== Volvo Ocean Race ====
- 4 October – 27 June 2015: 2014–15 Volvo Ocean Race
  - 4 October: In-Port Race in Alicante, Spain
  - 11 October: Leg #1 from Alicante, Spain to Cape Town, South Africa
  - 15 November: In-Port Race in Cape Town, South Africa
  - 19 November: Leg #2 from Cape Town, South Africa to Abu Dhabi, United Arab Emirates

==== World Match Racing Tour ====
- Alpari World Match Racing Tour
  - 5–9 June: Match Race Germany in Langenargen, Germany
  - 30 June – 5 July: Stena Match Cup in Marstrand, Sweden
  - 31 July – 3 August: Sopot Match Race in Sopot, Poland
  - 17–21 September: Chicago Match Cup in Chicago, United States
  - 24–28 September: Lelystad Match Race in Lelystad, Netherlands
  - 21–26 October: Argo Group Gold Cup in Hamilton, Bermuda

=== Other classes ===
==== World championships ====
- 8–15 February: Hobie 16 World Championships in New South Wales, Australia
- 1–8 March: Ice World Championships in Gizycko, Poland
- 6–11 May: IFCA Funboard Open Slalom World Championships in Azores, Portugal
- 16–21 June: IFCA Funboard Slalom Youth & Masters World Championships in Rosas, Spain
- 27 June – 7 July: Star World Championship in Malcesine, Italy
  - (gold) : Robert Stanjek & Frithjof Kleen (GER)
  - (silver) : Diego Negri & Sergio Lambertenghi (ITA)
  - (bronze) : Eivind Melleby & Bruno Prada (NOR)
- 12–18 July: ISAF Youth Sailing World Championships in Tavira, Portugal
- 19–26 July: Techno 293 World Under-15 Championships in Brest, France
- 25 July – 3 August: 420 World Championships in Travemünde, Germany
- 26 July – 2 August: Laser Radial World Youth Championships in Dziwnów, Poland
- 8–15 August: Laser 4.7 World Youth Championships in Karatsu, Japan
- 16–24 August: IFDS Combined World Championships in Halifax, Canada
- 18–24 August: IKA Formula Kite World Championships in Istanbul, Turkey
- 19–23 August: RS100 World Championship in Loctudy, France
- 6–13 September: J/70 World Championship in Newport, United States
  - (gold) : Timothy Healy, Paul Abdullah, Geoff Becker, & Gordon Borges (USA)
  - (silver) : Joel Ronning, Victor Diaz de Leon, & Bill Hardesty, & Willem van Waay (USA)
  - (bronze) : Brian Keane, Richard Clarke, & Anthony Kotoun, & Ronald Weed (USA)
- 18–25 October: RS:X World Youth Championships in Clearwater, United States
- 22 October – 2 November: Optimist World Championship in Buenos Aires, Argentina

==== African championships ====
- 1–5 May: Laser 4.7 African Championship in Algiers, Algeria
- 23–28 June: IKA African Championship in Egypt
- 4–9 September: Open Bic African Championship in Algiers, Algeria
- 6–14 September: Optimist African Championship in Maputo, Mozambique

==== Asian championships ====
- 28 March – 6 April: Optimist Asian Championship in Al Jazaeer Beach, Bahrain
- 10–15 November: IKA Asian Championship in Qatar

==== European championships ====
- 21–28 March: Dragon European Championship in Sanremo, Italy
- 2–9 May: Melges 24 European Championship in Balatonfüred, Hungary
- 21–27 June: A-Class Catamaran European Championship in Maubuisson, France
- 26–29 June: Sunfish European Championship in Gargnano, Italy
- 27–5 July: Hobie Multi European Championships in Castelldefels, Spain
- 28 June – 4 July: J/80 European Championship in Barcelona, Spain
- 9–13 July: European Match Racing Championship in Swinoujscie, Poland
- 18–20 July: Melges 32 European Championship in Riva del Garda, Italy
- 18–25 July: 6 Metre European Championship in Falmouth, United Kingdom
- 21–26 July: OK European Championship in Wunstorf, Germany
- 22–27 July: Flying Junior European Championship in Arco, Italy
- 25 July – 1 August: Laser 4.7 European Championship in Norway
- 8–13 August: Star European Championship in Brunnen, Switzerland
- 9–15 August: J/24 European Championship in Ängelholm, Sweden
- 11–18 August: 470 European Junior Championships in Gdynia, Poland
- 16–24 August: Snipe European Championship & Snipe European Junior Championship in Pomorshi, Poland
- 2–7 September: IKA European Championship in Poland
- 17–20 September: European Youth Sailing Championships in Viana do Castello, Portugal
- 24–27 September: J/70 European Championship in Lake Garda, Italy
- 27 September – 3 October: One Metre European Championship in Lake Garda, Italy
- 22–26 October: EUROSAF Disabled Sailing European Championship in Valencia, Spain

==== North American championships ====
- 6–10 August: Sonar North American Championship in Lunenburg, Canada
- 9–11 August: SKUD18 North American Championship in Halifax, Canada
- 23–27 September: J/70 North American Championship in Rochester, Canada
- 6–10 October: IKA North American Championship in United States

==== South American championships ====
- 3–8 February: Formula Kite South American Championships in San Andres Island, Colombia
- 3–8 February: IKA South American Championship in San Andres Island, Colombia
- 10–20 April: Optimist South American Championship in Colombia
- 29 December 2014 – 4 January 2015: 29er South American Championship in Mar del Plata, Argentina

=== Other events ===
- 20–24 May: Delta Lloyd Regatta in Medemblik, Netherlands
- 2–6 June: Sail for Gold in Weymouth & Portland, United Kingdom
- 21–29 June: Kiel Week in Kiel, Germany
- 14 December: 29er Coastal National Championship in Chennai, India
  - Gold - Varsha Gautham and Aishwarya Nedunchezhiyan
  - Silver - Mohammed Asif and Praveen Prabhakar
- 26 December 2014 – 1 January 2015: Sydney to Hobart Yacht Race from Sydney, Australia to Hobart, Australia
