= Monsoon Cup =

- First held: 2005
- Last held: 2015
- Type: match racing event on the World Match Racing Tour
- Classes: Foundation 36
- Venue: Terengganu, Malaysia
- Champion: Ian Williams (2015)
- Most titles: Ian Williams (3)
- Website: monsooncup.com.my

The Monsoon Cup was a yacht race in Malaysia, held in the state of Terengganu.

== Overview ==
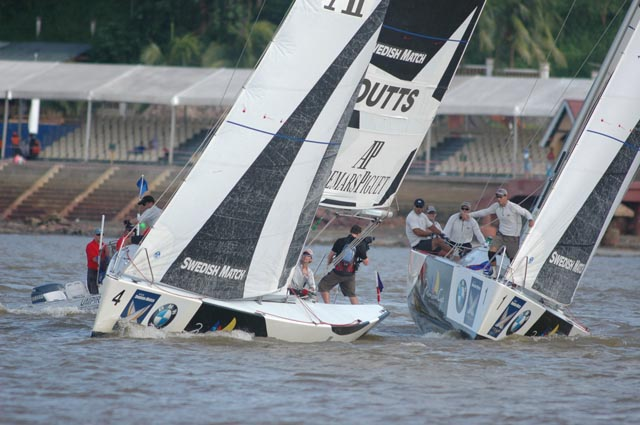

The Monsoon Cup was an annual event on the Alpari World Match Racing Tour calendar. It was also widely considered as the most formidable leg of the Tour. As the final event of the season, it saw the conclusion of an adrenaline fueled tournament with the crowning of the tour winner with the premier 'match racing' prize being the ISAF World Match Racing Champion. The match racing sport differs from other sailing disciplines in that the boats race one-on-one in supplied racing yachts. The yachts supplied for the Monsoon Cup are Foundation 36 type racing yachts.

The Cup was first initiated by the former Malaysian Prime Minister, Dato Seri Abdullah Ahmad Badawi during a fishing trip in Terengganu. The Prime Minister thought the monsoon season should be used as an advantage to the state rather than being seen as a hurdle. The economic objectives of the whole exercise was for the Monsoon Cup to serve as a catalyst for development in the state and to create economic opportunities in services and manufacturing sectors related to the event. Amongst the businesses that benefited from this event were the hoteliers, restaurateurs, boat-makers, food suppliers as well as tourist related industries such as the arts and crafts, textiles and souvenirs. The Monsoon Cup has helped modernize Pulau Duyong which is the venue for the event, from a sleepy fishing and boat-making village into a modern international-class resort and marina complete with boat repairing facilities.

The Monsoon Cup in 2011 was held at Pulau Duyong, Terengganu, from 23 to 28 November 2011 which started with the Asian Qualifier leg and was followed by the Malaysian Qualifier.

In the year 2012, Monsoon Cup was the eighth and final event on the World Match Racing Tour 2012. Twelve of the best match racing teams met on the waters off Terengganu in Malaysia from 3 to 8 December 2012 to contest the event. The battle for the championship trophy saw the top sailing teams in the world pitting their skills against each other in the last leg of the tour.

The 2013 Monsoon Cup event was held in the second half of November. The main match racing event occurred from 25 to 30 November. Prior to the main event, the 'Malaysian Match Racing Championship' which served as a local qualifiers for a spot in the Monsoon Cup was held from 15 to 18 November. This was followed by a youth sailing program called 'Belia Berlayar' held from 19 to 22 November with participants receiving their certificates of participation during the main event.

Monsoon Cup not only catapulted sailing into the Malaysian mindset but served as a catalyst in promoting the state of Terengganu, both as a tourist destination and as a center for developing marine based business activities.

This sailing event ignited interest in 'match racing' and yachting in Asia and helped increase awareness of the prestigious America's Cup. A majority of the participants in the Monsoon Cup were sailors that competed in the America's Cup and was also participated in by three-time Olympic gold medalist Ben Ainslie.

The success of the Monsoon Cup has also helped create the Korea Match Cup and spurred Singapore and Qingdao in China to be venues for the Volvo Ocean Race and Olympics respectively.

== Winners ==
=== Monsoon Cup ===
| Year | Champion |
|---|---|
| 2005 | (Australia) Peter Gilmour |
| 2006 | (United States Virgin Islands) Peter Holmberg |
| 2007 | (United Kingdom) Ian Williams |
| 2008 | (Australia) Peter Gilmour |
| 2009 | (New Zealand) Adam Minoprio |
| 2010 | (United Kingdom) Ben Ainslie |
| 2011 | (United Kingdom) Ian Williams |
| 2012 | (United States Virgin Islands) Taylor Canfield |
| 2013 | (New Zealand) Phil Robertson |
| 2015 | (United Kingdom) Ian Williams |

=== Asian Match Racing Championships ===
The Malaysian Match Racing Championship, otherwise known as 'Liga Layar Malaysia', is an event where Malaysian based teams compete for the qualifying position in the Monsoon Cup. The event is an initiative to modernize the local sailing circuit with the aim of providing a platform for local sailors to learn, compete and eventually create world beaters for competitions.

The match race is held on a league round format in every state and the team that collects the highest number of points will go on to represent Malaysia in the Monsoon Cup.

| Edition | Winning team |
|---|---|
| 2006 | Adam Minoprio and BlackMatch Racing |
| 2007 | Adam Minoprio and BlackMatch Racing |
| 2008 | Keith Swinton and BlackSwan Racing |
| 2009 | Phil Robertson and WAKA Racing |
| 2010 | Phil Robertson and WAKA Racing |
| 2011 | William Tiller and Full Metal Jacket Racing |

=== Malaysian Match Racing Championships ===
| Edition | Winning team |
|---|---|
| 2006 | Tiffany Khoo and Team Selangor Gapurna 1 |
| 2007 | Tiffany Khoo and Team UK Halsey Gapurna |
| 2008 | Nurul Ain and Perak Sailing Team |
| 2009 | Hazwan Hazim Dermawan and Taring Pelangi |
| 2010 | Jeremy Koo and Koo Racing Team-Evernew |
| 2011 | Jeremy Koo and Abdullah Chan-Koo Racing Team |
| 2012 | Jeremy Koo and KFC Malaysia-Koo Racing Team |
| 2013 | Jeremy Koo and KFC Malaysia-Koo Racing Team |
| 2014 | Jeremy Koo and Sime Darby Foundation-Koo Racing Team |
| 2015 | Jeremy Koo and Sime Darby Foundation-Koo Racing Team |

== Belia Belayar program ==
A spin off from the Monsoon Cup is a youth sailing program called 'Belia Belayar'. The program is aimed at providing an opportunity for youths above the age of 10, from schools in the Kuala Terengganu area, to experience hands on sailing. The participants would be mentored by competent F36 coaches. This program would serve as a platform to introduce youths to the sport of match racing.

The program begins with a short 20 minute learn to sail theory session where the children would be taught basic sailing concepts, crewing positions and about safety on board the boats. This would be followed by a 40-minute on water sailing experience. Participants would then be invited back on the day of the Monsoon Cup event to receive certifications in recognition of their participation in the program.

== The yachts ==
Boat: Foundation 36 Designer: Brett Bakewell-White

The concept for the Foundation 36 yacht was developed by the Western Australian Yachting Foundation in conjunction with the boat builder Peter Milner and the designer Brett Bakewell-White. The WAYF specifically wanted a yacht for day sailing and match racing, with a racing crew of 5 or comfortably sail with 12 people for corporate sailing functions.

The yachts are built in glass reinforced polyester with foam core and plywood bulkheads to American Bureau of Shipping and USL codes determined by the Western Australian Department of Planning and Infrastructure specifications. The lead keel is encased in fiberglass and slotted into a recess in the hull to ensure the alignment is identical across the fleet. This makes the yachts perfect match racing as they are all identical.

Great detail has gone into the stem and sheer design to ensure that the yachts have extremely strong edges to minimize "down time" during events due to collisions. The deck layout has a large self-draining cockpit, with cabin top mounted aluminum self-tailing secondary winches and deck-mounted primary winches.

A centrally mounted padeye for the mainsheet increases the ease of sailing and maintenance. Control lines for the backstay, and mainsheet fine tune are led under the deck to a central, raised mainsheet control station.

Specifications LOA — 35.63’ (10.86m) Beam — 11.42’ (3.48m) Draft — 6.23’ (1.9m) Displacement — 8,487 lbs (3,850 kg)
