= Match Race Germany =

Sailing competition

- First held: 1997
- Type: match racing event on the World Match Racing Tour
- Classes: Bavaria 40
- Venue: Langenargen, Germany
- Champion: Tomislav Basic (2015)
- Most titles: Peter Gilmour (3)
- Website: www.matchrace.de

Match Race Germany is an annual match racing sailing competition and event on the World Match Racing Tour. It is sailed in Bavaria 40 yachts.

== Winners ==
Year	Champion	Runner-up	Third place	Fourth place
1997	(Denmark) Mikkel Rossberg			
1998	(Australia) Neville Wittey			
2000	(France) Bertrand Pacé			
2001	(Germany) Marcus Wieser			
2002	(Denmark) Jesper Radich			
2003	(Denmark) Jesper Radich			
2004	(Australia) Peter Gilmour			
2005	(Australia) Peter Gilmour			
2006	(Australia) Peter Gilmour			
2007	(Italy) Paolo Cian			
2008	(France) Damien Iehl			
2009	(United Kingdom) Ben Ainslie			
2010	(New Zealand) Adam Minoprio			
2011	(Italy) Francesco Bruni			
2012	(New Zealand) Phil Robertson			
2013	(United Kingdom) Ian Williams	(New Zealand) Adam Minoprio	(France) Mathieu Richard	(Sweden) Johnie Berntsson
2014	(United Kingdom) Ian Williams	(Australia) Keith Swinton	(France) Mathieu Richard	(New Zealand) Phil Robertson
2015	(Croatia) Tomislav Basic	(Switzerland) Eric Monnin	(Denmark) Joachim Aschenbrenner	(Australia) Matthew Jerwood
2016	(Poland) Karol Jablonski	(France) Maxime Mesnil	(France) Pierre Rhimbault	(Republic of Ireland) Philip Bendon
2017	(Switzerland) Eric Monnin	(Estonia) Mati Sepp	(Germany) Max Gurgel	(Austria) Max Trippolt
