= 2013–14 Premier League =

Football season in England

Premier League
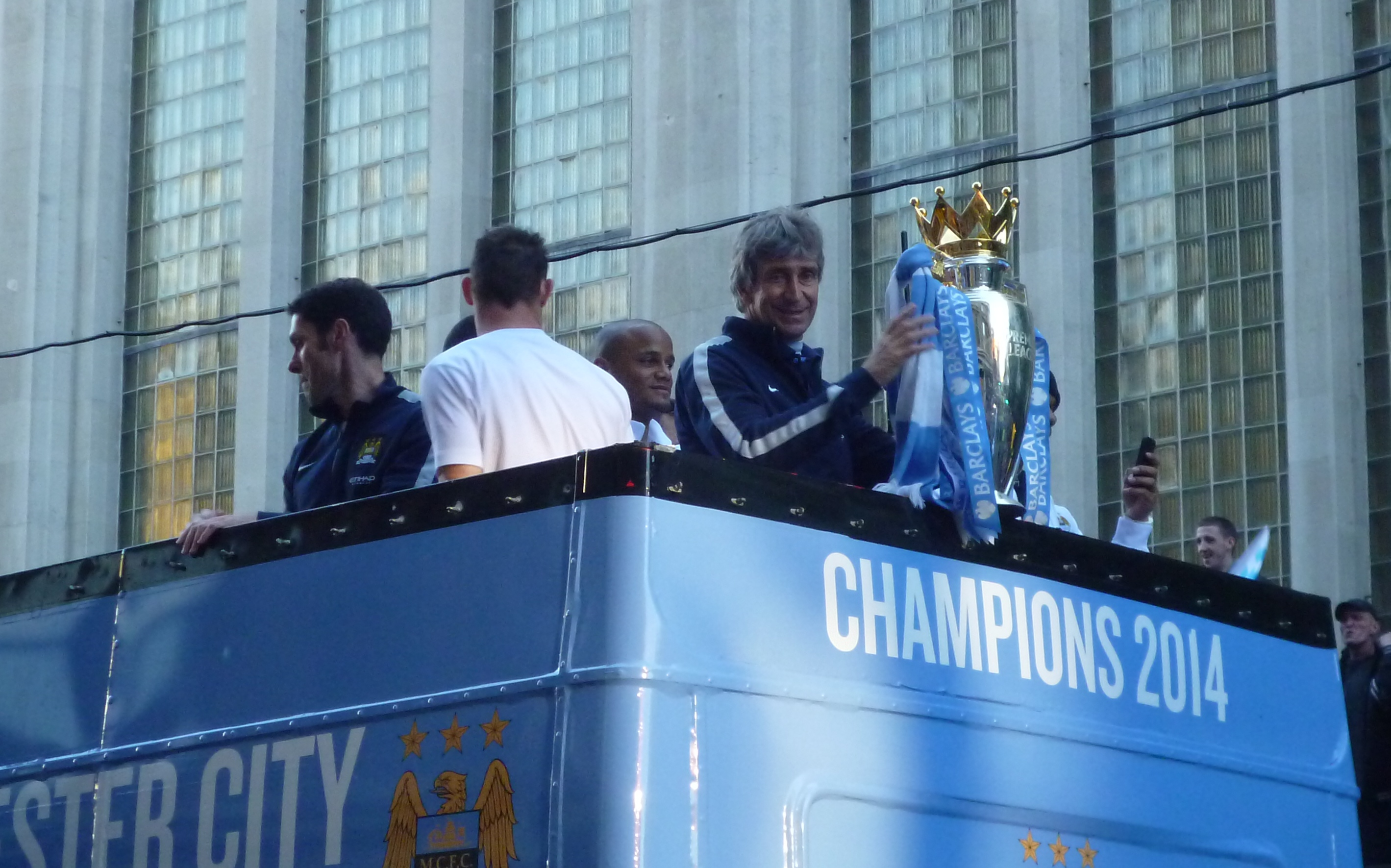
- Season: 2013–14
- Dates: 17 August 2013 – 11 May 2014
- Champions: Manchester City; 2nd Premier League title 4th English title
- Relegated: Norwich City; Fulham; Cardiff City
- Champions League: Manchester City; Liverpool; Chelsea; Arsenal
- Europa League: Everton; Tottenham Hotspur; Hull City
- Matches: 380
- Goals: 1,052 (2.77 per match)
- Top goalscorer: Luis Suárez (31 goals)
- Best goalkeeper: Petr Čech; Wojciech Szczęsny (16 clean sheets each)
- Biggest home win: Manchester City 7–0 Norwich City (2 November 2013)
- Biggest away win: Tottenham Hotspur 0–5 Liverpool (15 December 2013)
- Highest scoring: Manchester City 6–3 Arsenal (14 December 2013); Cardiff City 3–6 Liverpool (22 March 2014)
- Longest winning run: 11 games Liverpool
- Longest unbeaten run: 16 games Liverpool
- Longest winless run: 9 games Fulham; Sunderland; West Bromwich Albion
- Longest losing run: 7 games Crystal Palace
- Highest attendance: 75,368; Manchester United 4–1 Aston Villa (29 March 2014)
- Lowest attendance: 19,242; Swansea City 3–3 Stoke City (10 November 2013)
- Total attendance: 13,929,810
- Average attendance: 36,657

The 2013–14 Premier League (known as the Barclays Premier League for sponsorship reasons) was the 22nd season of the Premier League, the top-flight English professional league for men's football clubs, and the 115th season of top-flight English football overall. The fixtures were announced on 19 June 2013. The season started on Saturday 17 August 2013, and concluded on Sunday 11 May 2014.

On the final day of the season, Manchester City sealed their fourth league title and second Premier League title with a 2–0 victory over West Ham United, finishing with 86 points. Liverpool had looked on course to win the title with two weeks to go, but a loss and a draw in two of their last three matches, combined with Manchester City winning their final five league matches, ultimately meant they finished in second place with 84 points. Chelsea finished third and Arsenal, who led the table for the longest period, finished fourth. For the third time in four seasons, the top-seven places were dominated by the so-called ‘Big Six’ clubs (Arsenal, Chelsea, Liverpool, Manchester City, Manchester United and Tottenham Hotspur) and Everton.

Manchester United's first season following Alex Ferguson's departure ended in disappointment, as the defending champions would finish 7th, tying the record for the worst title defence with the 1994–95 champions Blackburn Rovers. At the time, it was also their worst finish in the Premier League era.

Norwich City, Fulham, and Cardiff City finished in the bottom three and were relegated to the Football League Championship.

Luis Suárez was the top scorer with 31 goals, and was also named Player of the Season. Goalkeepers Wojciech Szczęsny of Arsenal and Petr Čech of Chelsea led the league with 16 clean sheets each. Tony Pulis of Crystal Palace won the Manager of the Season award.

An independent commission later found that Manchester City breached Premier League financial rules during this season, part of a pattern of breaches spanning 2009-2018.

== Season summary ==
The 380 fixtures for the 2013–14 Premier League season were announced on 19 June 2013. The television broadcast rights were given two-to-three weeks later. The season started on Saturday 17 August 2013, and concluded on Sunday 11 May 2014. During the 2013–14 season, the Premier League used goal-line technology for the first time.

During the 2013–14 season, first place changed hands 25 times, compared to just four times during the 2012–13 season. That represented the most lead changes since the 2001–02 season – which had 29, the most ever. The championship was not decided until the final day of play for just the seventh time in league history. Manchester City won the league with a 2–0 victory over West Ham United on the final day, finishing with 86 points. In total, Manchester City led the league just 14 days throughout the season en route to their second championship in the last three seasons. The club scored 102 goals, one short of the record, while also conceding the second fewest goals in the league.

With two weeks to go, Liverpool looked on course to win the championship before they had a loss and a draw in two of their final three games. The team ended up in second place with 84 points. Chelsea came third, while perennial power and 2013 champions Manchester United had a disappointing season under new manager David Moyes (who was sacked in April) and finished seventh. It was their first finish outside the top four in Premier League history, their worst finish overall since 1989–90, and the first time they had not qualified for European football in 25 years. Southampton's eighth-place finish and Everton's 72 points were club records.

Sunderland became only the second team in the Premier League era to avoid relegation having been bottom of the table on Christmas Day. Defeat at home to Everton on 12 April left Gus Poyet's side bottom of the table, seven points from safety (albeit with two games in hand). The club's 'great escape' began with a draw away at eventual champions Manchester City, followed by a run of four wins, including remarkable away victories at Chelsea and Manchester United. Their 2–0 victory over West Bromwich Albion on 7 May confirmed their top flight status for next season. Four days earlier, Cardiff City and Fulham were both relegated to the Football League Championship, after losses away at Newcastle and Stoke City, respectively. On the final day of the season, Norwich were relegated after losing to Arsenal.

Two teams (Manchester City and Liverpool) scored more than 100 goals for the first time in Premier League history. The feat had only once been achieved before – by Chelsea in 2009–10. Luis Suárez won the golden boot for most goals with 31, ahead of teammate Daniel Sturridge who came second with 21 goals. Wojciech Szczęsny of Arsenal and Petr Čech of Chelsea led the league with 16 clean sheets each. In a game against Southampton, Asmir Begović became just the fifth goalkeeper in league history to score. Begovic's goal was also the fastest of the season, occurring just 12 seconds into the game. Mile Jedinak had the most tackles with 133. Chelsea manager José Mourinho lost a home game for the first time in his Premier League career, losing to Sunderland and ending a run of 77-straight home games unbeaten, stretching over two stints as Chelsea manager.

== Teams ==
Twenty teams competed in the league – the top seventeen teams from the previous season and the three teams promoted from the Championship. The promoted teams were Cardiff City, Hull City and Crystal Palace, returning to the top flight after absences of fifty-one, three and eight years respectively. This was also Cardiff City's first season in the Premier League. They replaced Wigan Athletic, Reading and Queens Park Rangers, who were relegated to the Championship after spending eight, one and two years in the top flight respectively.

=== Stadiums and locations ===
Locations of the 2013–14 Premier League teams
Greater London Premier League football clubs

Note: Table lists clubs in alphabetical order.

Team	Location	Stadium	Capacity
Arsenal	London (Holloway)	Emirates Stadium	60,362
Aston Villa	Birmingham	Villa Park	42,785
Cardiff City	Cardiff	Cardiff City Stadium	27,815
Chelsea	London (Fulham)	Stamford Bridge	42,055
Crystal Palace	London (Selhurst)	Selhurst Park	26,255
Everton	Liverpool (Walton)	Goodison Park	40,157
Fulham	London (Fulham)	Craven Cottage	25,700
Hull City	Kingston upon Hull	KC Stadium	25,400
Liverpool	Liverpool (Anfield)	Anfield	45,276
Manchester City	Manchester (Bradford)	City of Manchester Stadium	47,405
Manchester United	Manchester (Old Trafford)	Old Trafford	76,212
Newcastle United	Newcastle upon Tyne	St James' Park	52,405
Norwich City	Norwich	Carrow Road	27,224
Southampton	Southampton	St Mary's Stadium	32,689
Stoke City	Stoke-on-Trent	Britannia Stadium	27,740
Sunderland	Sunderland	Stadium of Light	49,000
Swansea City	Swansea	Liberty Stadium	20,750
Tottenham Hotspur	London (Tottenham)	White Hart Lane	36,284
West Bromwich Albion	West Bromwich	The Hawthorns	26,445
West Ham United	London (Upton Park)	Boleyn Ground	35,016

=== Personnel and kits ===
Note: Flags indicate national team as has been defined under FIFA eligibility rules. Players may hold more than one non-FIFA nationality.

Team	Manager	Captain	Kit manufacturer	Shirt sponsor
Arsenal	(France) Arsène Wenger	(Belgium) Thomas Vermaelen	Nike	Emirates
Aston Villa	(Scotland) Paul Lambert	(Netherlands) Ron Vlaar	Macron	dafabet
Cardiff City	(Norway) Ole Gunnar Solskjær	(England) Mark Hudson	Puma	Malaysia
Chelsea	(Portugal) José Mourinho	(England) John Terry	Adidas	Samsung
Crystal Palace	(Wales) Tony Pulis	(Republic of Ireland) Paddy McCarthy	Avec	GAC Logistics
Everton	(Spain) Roberto Martínez	(England) Phil Jagielka	Nike	Chang
Fulham	(Germany) Felix Magath	(Norway) Brede Hangeland	Adidas	Marathonbet
Hull City	(England) Steve Bruce	(Slovenia) Robert Koren	Adidas	Cash Converters
Liverpool	(Northern Ireland) Brendan Rodgers	(England) Steven Gerrard	Warrior	Standard Chartered
Manchester City	(Chile) Manuel Pellegrini	(Belgium) Vincent Kompany	Nike	Etihad Airways
Manchester United	(Wales) Ryan Giggs (interim player-manager)	(Serbia) Nemanja Vidić	Nike	Aon
Newcastle United	(England) Alan Pardew	(Argentina) Fabricio Coloccini	Puma	Wonga
Norwich City	(England) Neil Adams	(Scotland) Russell Martin	Erreà	Aviva
Southampton	(Argentina) Mauricio Pochettino	(England) Adam Lallana	Adidas	aap3
Stoke City	(Wales) Mark Hughes	(England) Ryan Shawcross	Adidas	Bet365
Sunderland	(Uruguay) Gus Poyet	(Republic of Ireland) John O'Shea	Adidas	BFS Group
Swansea City	(England) Garry Monk	(Wales) Ashley Williams	Adidas	GWFX
Tottenham Hotspur	(England) Tim Sherwood	(England) Michael Dawson	Under Armour	HP
West Bromwich Albion	(Spain) Pepe Mel	(Northern Ireland) Chris Brunt	Adidas	Zoopla
West Ham United	(England) Sam Allardyce	(England) Kevin Nolan	Adidas	Alpari

- Additionally, referee kits are now being made by Nike, sponsored by EA Sports, and Nike has a new match ball, the Incyte Premier League.

=== Managerial changes ===
A record 10 managers left their position mid-season during the 2013–14 campaign.

Team	Outgoing manager	Manner of departure	Date of vacancy	Position in table	Incoming manager	Date of appointment
Everton	(Scotland) David Moyes	End of contract	19 May 2013	Pre-season	(Spain) Roberto Martínez	5 June 2013
Manchester City	(England) Brian Kidd (caretaker)	End of caretaker spell	19 May 2013	Pre-season	(Chile) Manuel Pellegrini	14 June 2013
Stoke City	(Wales) Tony Pulis	Mutual consent	21 May 2013	Pre-season	(Wales) Mark Hughes	30 May 2013
Chelsea	(Spain) Rafael Benítez	End of caretaker spell	27 May 2013	Pre-season	(Portugal) José Mourinho	3 June 2013
Manchester United	(Scotland) Alex Ferguson	Retired	1 July 2013	Pre-season	(Scotland) David Moyes	1 July 2013
Sunderland	(Italy) Paolo Di Canio	Sacked	22 September 2013	20th	(Uruguay) Gus Poyet	8 October 2013
Crystal Palace	(England) Ian Holloway	Mutual consent	23 October 2013	19th	(Wales) Tony Pulis	23 November 2013
Fulham	(Netherlands) Martin Jol	Sacked	1 December 2013	18th	(Netherlands) René Meulensteen	1 December 2013
West Bromwich Albion	(Scotland) Steve Clarke	Sacked	14 December 2013	16th	(Spain) Pepe Mel	9 January 2014
Tottenham Hotspur	(Portugal) André Villas-Boas	Mutual consent	16 December 2013	7th	(England) Tim Sherwood	16 December 2013
Cardiff City	(Scotland) Malky Mackay	Sacked	27 December 2013	16th	(Norway) Ole Gunnar Solskjær	2 January 2014
Swansea City	(Denmark) Michael Laudrup	Sacked	4 February 2014	12th	(England) Garry Monk	4 February 2014
Fulham	(Netherlands) René Meulensteen	Sacked	14 February 2014	20th	(Germany) Felix Magath	14 February 2014
Norwich City	(Republic of Ireland) Chris Hughton	Sacked	6 April 2014	17th	(England) Neil Adams	6 April 2014
Manchester United	(Scotland) David Moyes	Sacked	22 April 2014	7th	(Wales) Ryan Giggs (interim player-manager)	22 April 2014
Manchester United	(Wales) Ryan Giggs	End of caretaker spell	19 May 2014	7th	(Netherlands) Louis van Gaal	19 May 2014

== League table ==
Pos	Team	Pld	W	D	L	GF	GA	GD	Pts	Qualification or relegation
1	Manchester City (C)	38	27	5	6	102	37	+65	86	Qualification for the Champions League group stage
2	Liverpool	38	26	6	6	101	50	+51	84	Qualification for the Champions League group stage
3	Chelsea	38	25	7	6	71	27	+44	82	Qualification for the Champions League group stage
4	Arsenal	38	24	7	7	68	41	+27	79	Qualification for the Champions League play-off round
5	Everton	38	21	9	8	61	39	+22	72	Qualification for the Europa League group stage
6	Tottenham Hotspur	38	21	6	11	55	51	+4	69	Qualification for the Europa League play-off round (Note: Since the winners of 2013–14 Football League Cup (Manchester City) qualified for the Champions League, the spot awarded to them (Europa League play-off round) was passed to the 6th-placed team.)
7	Manchester United	38	19	7	12	64	43	+21	64	
8	Southampton	38	15	11	12	54	46	+8	56	
9	Stoke City	38	13	11	14	45	52	−7	50	
10	Newcastle United	38	15	4	19	43	59	−16	49	
11	Crystal Palace	38	13	6	19	33	48	−15	45	
12	Swansea City	38	11	9	18	54	54	0	42	
13	West Ham United	38	11	7	20	40	51	−11	40	
14	Sunderland	38	10	8	20	41	60	−19	38	
15	Aston Villa	38	10	8	20	39	61	−22	38	
16	Hull City	38	10	7	21	38	53	−15	37	Qualification for the Europa League third qualifying round (Note: Hull City qualified for the Europa League third qualifying round as runners-up of the 2013–14 FA Cup since winners Arsenal qualified for Champions League.)
17	West Bromwich Albion	38	7	15	16	43	59	−16	36	
18	Norwich City (R)	38	8	9	21	28	62	−34	33	Relegation to Football League Championship
19	Fulham (R)	38	9	5	24	40	85	−45	32	Relegation to Football League Championship
20	Cardiff City (R)	38	7	9	22	32	74	−42	30	Relegation to Football League Championship

Source: Barclays Premier League
Rules for classification: 1) Points; 2) Goal difference; 3) Goals scored; 4) Play-offs (only if needed to decide champion, teams for relegation or teams for UEFA competitions).
(C) Champions; (R) Relegated

== Results ==
Home \ Away	ARS	AVL	CAR	CHE	CRY	EVE	FUL	HUL	LIV	MCI	MUN	NEW	NOR	SOU	STK	SUN	SWA	TOT	WBA	WHU
Arsenal	—	1–3	2–0	0–0	2–0	1–1	2–0	2–0	2–0	1–1	0–0	3–0	4–1	2–0	3–1	4–1	2–2	1–0	1–0	3–1
Aston Villa	1–2	—	2–0	1–0	0–1	0–2	1–2	3–1	0–1	3–2	0–3	1–2	4–1	0–0	1–4	0–0	1–1	0–2	4–3	0–2
Cardiff City	0–3	0–0	—	1–2	0–3	0–0	3–1	0–4	3–6	3–2	2–2	1–2	2–1	0–3	1–1	2–2	1–0	0–1	1–0	0–2
Chelsea	6–0	2–1	4–1	—	2–1	1–0	2–0	2–0	2–1	2–1	3–1	3–0	0–0	3–1	3–0	1–2	1–0	4–0	2–2	0–0
Crystal Palace	0–2	1–0	2–0	1–0	—	0–0	1–4	1–0	3–3	0–2	0–2	0–3	1–1	0–1	1–0	3–1	0–2	0–1	3–1	1–0
Everton	3–0	2–1	2–1	1–0	2–3	—	4–1	2–1	3–3	2–3	2–0	3–2	2–0	2–1	4–0	0–1	3–2	0–0	0–0	1–0
Fulham	1–3	2–0	1–2	1–3	2–2	1–3	—	2–2	2–3	2–4	1–3	1–0	1–0	0–3	1–0	1–4	1–2	1–2	1–1	2–1
Hull City	0–3	0–0	1–1	0–2	0–1	0–2	6–0	—	3–1	0–2	2–3	1–4	1–0	0–1	0–0	1–0	1–0	1–1	2–0	1–0
Liverpool	5–1	2–2	3–1	0–2	3–1	4–0	4–0	2–0	—	3–2	1–0	2–1	5–1	0–1	1–0	2–1	4–3	4–0	4–1	4–1
Manchester City	6–3	4–0	4–2	0–1	1–0	3–1	5–0	2–0	2–1	—	4–1	4–0	7–0	4–1	1–0	2–2	3–0	6–0	3–1	2–0
Manchester United	1–0	4–1	2–0	0–0	2–0	0–1	2–2	3–1	0–3	0–3	—	0–1	4–0	1–1	3–2	0–1	2–0	1–2	1–2	3–1
Newcastle United	0–1	1–0	3–0	2–0	1–0	0–3	1–0	2–3	2–2	0–2	0–4	—	2–1	1–1	5–1	0–3	1–2	0–4	2–1	0–0
Norwich City	0–2	0–1	0–0	1–3	1–0	2–2	1–2	1–0	2–3	0–0	0–1	0–0	—	1–0	1–1	2–0	1–1	1–0	0–1	3–1
Southampton	2–2	2–3	0–1	0–3	2–0	2–0	2–0	4–1	0–3	1–1	1–1	4–0	4–2	—	2–2	1–1	2–0	2–3	1–0	0–0
Stoke City	1–0	2–1	0–0	3–2	2–1	1–1	4–1	1–0	3–5	0–0	2–1	1–0	0–1	1–1	—	2–0	1–1	0–1	0–0	3–1
Sunderland	1–3	0–1	4–0	3–4	0–0	0–1	0–1	0–2	1–3	1–0	1–2	2–1	0–0	2–2	1–0	—	1–3	1–2	2–0	1–2
Swansea City	1–2	4–1	3–0	0–1	1–1	1–2	2–0	1–1	2–2	2–3	1–4	3–0	3–0	0–1	3–3	4–0	—	1–3	1–2	0–0
Tottenham Hotspur	0–1	3–0	1–0	1–1	2–0	1–0	3–1	1–0	0–5	1–5	2–2	0–1	2–0	3–2	3–0	5–1	1–0	—	1–1	0–3
West Bromwich Albion	1–1	2–2	3–3	1–1	2–0	1–1	1–1	1–1	1–1	2–3	0–3	1–0	0–2	0–1	1–2	3–0	0–2	3–3	—	1–0
West Ham United	1–3	0–0	2–0	0–3	0–1	2–3	3–0	2–1	1–2	1–3	0–2	1–3	2–0	3–1	0–1	0–0	2–0	2–0	3–3	—

Updated to match(es) played on 11 May 2014. Source: Barclays Premier League
Legend: Blue = home team win; Yellow = draw; Red = away team win.

== Season statistics ==
=== Scoring ===
- First goal: Daniel Sturridge for Liverpool against Stoke City (37th minute, 13:22 BST) (17 August 2013)
- Fastest goal: 12 seconds (Asmir Begović (GK); Stoke City 1–1 Southampton 2 November 2013)
- Largest winning margin: 7 goals
  - Manchester City 7–0 Norwich City (2 November 2013)
- Highest scoring game: 9 goals
  - Manchester City 6–3 Arsenal (14 December 2013)
  - Cardiff City 3–6 Liverpool (22 March 2014)
- Most goals scored in a match by a single team: 7 goals
  - Manchester City 7–0 Norwich City (2 November 2013)
- Most goals scored in a match by a losing team: 3 goals
  - Sunderland 3–4 Chelsea (4 December 2013)
  - Manchester City 6–3 Arsenal (14 December 2013)
  - Stoke City 3–5 Liverpool (12 January 2014)
  - Aston Villa 4–3 West Bromwich Albion (29 January 2014)
  - Liverpool 4–3 Swansea City (23 February 2014)
  - Cardiff City 3–6 Liverpool (22 March 2014)

==== Top scorers ====
Rank	Player	Club	Goals
1	(Uruguay) Luis Suárez	Liverpool	31
2	(England) Daniel Sturridge	Liverpool	21
3	(Ivory Coast) Yaya Touré	Manchester City	20
4	(Argentina) Sergio Agüero	Manchester City	17
4	(England) Wayne Rooney	Manchester United	17
6	(Ivory Coast) Wilfried Bony	Swansea City	16
6	(Bosnia and Herzegovina) Edin Džeko	Manchester City	16
6	(France) Olivier Giroud	Arsenal	16
9	(Belgium) Romelu Lukaku	Everton	15
9	(England) Jay Rodriguez	Southampton	15

==== Hat-tricks ====
Player	For	Against	Result	Date
(Uruguay) Luis Suárez	Liverpool	West Bromwich Albion	4–1	26 October 2013
(Uruguay) Luis Suárez^{4}	Liverpool	Norwich City	5–1	4 December 2013
(England) Adam Johnson	Sunderland	Fulham	4–1	11 January 2014
(Cameroon) Samuel Eto'o	Chelsea	Manchester United	3–1	19 January 2014
(Belgium) Eden Hazard	Chelsea	Newcastle United	3–0	8 February 2014
(Germany) André Schürrle	Chelsea	Fulham	3–1	1 March 2014
(Ivory Coast) Yaya Touré	Manchester City	Fulham	5–0	22 March 2014
(Uruguay) Luis Suárez	Liverpool	Cardiff City	6–3	22 March 2014

^{4} Player scored four goals

=== Clean sheets ===
==== Player ====
Rank	Player	Club	Clean sheets
1	(Czech Republic) Petr Čech	Chelsea	16
1	(Poland) Wojciech Szczęsny	Arsenal	16
3	(United States) Tim Howard	Everton	15
4	(Poland) Artur Boruc	Southampton	14
4	(France) Hugo Lloris	Tottenham Hotspur	14
6	(England) Joe Hart	Manchester City	13
7	(Spain) David de Gea	Manchester United	12
7	(England) John Ruddy	Norwich City	12
7	(Argentina) Julián Speroni	Crystal Palace	12
10	(Italy) Vito Mannone	Sunderland	11

==== Club ====
- Most clean sheets: 18
  - Chelsea
- Fewest clean sheets: 5
  - Fulham

=== Discipline ===
==== Player ====
- Most yellow cards: 11
  - (Argentina) Pablo Zabaleta (Manchester City)
- Most red cards: 3
  - (England) Wes Brown (Sunderland)

==== Club ====
- Most yellow cards: 78
  - Aston Villa
- Most red cards: 7
  - Sunderland

== Awards ==
=== Monthly awards ===
Month	Manager of the Month		Player of the Month		Reference
Month	Manager	Club	Player	Club	Reference
August	(Northern Ireland) Brendan Rodgers	Liverpool	(England) Daniel Sturridge	Liverpool	
September	(France) Arsène Wenger	Arsenal	(Wales) Aaron Ramsey	Arsenal	
October	(Argentina) Mauricio Pochettino	Southampton	(Argentina) Sergio Agüero	Manchester City	
November	(England) Alan Pardew	Newcastle United	(Netherlands) Tim Krul	Newcastle United	
December	(Chile) Manuel Pellegrini	Manchester City	(Uruguay) Luis Suárez	Liverpool	
January	(Chile) Manuel Pellegrini	Manchester City	(England) Adam Johnson	Sunderland	
February	(England) Sam Allardyce	West Ham United	(England) Daniel Sturridge	Liverpool	
March	(Northern Ireland) Brendan Rodgers	Liverpool	(Uruguay) Luis Suárez & (England) Steven Gerrard (shared)	Liverpool	
April	(Wales) Tony Pulis	Crystal Palace	(England) Connor Wickham	Sunderland	

=== Annual awards ===
Award	Winner	Club
Premier League Manager of the Season	(Wales) Tony Pulis	Crystal Palace
Premier League Player of the Season	(Uruguay) Luis Suárez	Liverpool
PFA Players' Player of the Year	(Uruguay) Luis Suárez	Liverpool
PFA Young Player of the Year	(Belgium) Eden Hazard	Chelsea
FWA Footballer of the Year	(Uruguay) Luis Suárez	Liverpool

PFA Team of the Year
Goalkeeper	(Czech Republic) Petr Čech (Chelsea)			
Defenders	(Republic of Ireland) Séamus Coleman (Everton)	(England) Gary Cahill (Chelsea)	(Belgium) Vincent Kompany (Manchester City)	(England) Luke Shaw (Southampton)
Midfielders	(England) Steven Gerrard (Liverpool)	(England) Adam Lallana (Southampton)	(Ivory Coast) Yaya Touré (Manchester City)	(Belgium) Eden Hazard (Chelsea)
Forwards	(Uruguay) Luis Suárez (Liverpool)		(England) Daniel Sturridge (Liverpool)	

== Average attendances ==
Club	Average attendance
Manchester United	75,207
Arsenal	60,013
Newcastle United	50,395
Manchester City	47,075
Liverpool	44,671
Chelsea	41,482
Sunderland	41,090
Everton	37,732
Aston Villa	36,081
Tottenham Hotspur	35,808
West Ham United	34,197
Southampton	30,212
Cardiff City	27,430
Norwich City	26,805
Stoke City	26,137
West Bromwich Albion	25,194
Fulham	24,977
Crystal Palace	24,375
Hull City	24,117
Swansea City	20,407
