= ISAF Open Match Racing World Championship =

An ISAF Open Match Racing World Champion has been named annually since 1988. Since 2006 the World Match Racing Tour Champion has been named ISAF Match Racing World Champion.

== Editions ==
Event	Gold	Silver	Bronze
1988 Perth	Chris Dickson (NZL)		
1989 Lymington	Chris Dickson (NZL)		
1990 Auckland	Peter Gilmour (AUS)	Rod Davis (NZL)	Peter Isler (USA)
1991 Hamilton	Chris Dickson (NZL)	Peter Isler (USA)	Russell Coutts (NZL)
1992 Perth	Russell Coutts (NZL)	Kevin Mahaney (USA)	Peter Gilmour (AUS)
1993 Long Beach	Russell Coutts (NZL)	Ed Baird (USA)	Rod Davis (NZL)
1994 La Rochelle	Bertrand Pacé (FRA)	Paul Cayard (USA)	Rod Davis (NZL)
1995 Auckland	Ed Baird (USA)	Roy Heiner (NED)	Bertrand Pacé (FRA)
1996 Dubrovnik	Russell Coutts (NZL)	Ed Baird (USA)	Peter Gilmour (AUS)
1997 Marstrand	Peter Gilmour (AUS)	Ed Baird (USA)	Jesper Bank (DEN)
1998 Hayama	Peter Gilmour (AUS)	Ed Baird (USA)	Jesper Bank (DEN)
1999 Copenhagen	Jesper Bank (DEN)	Bertrand Pacé (FRA)	Gavin Brady (NZL)
2000 Split	Dean Barker (NZL)	Peter Gilmour (AUS)	Sten Mohr (DEN)
2001	not held		
2002 Stockholm	Karol Jabłoński (POL)	Jes Gram-Hansen (DEN)	Björn Hansen (SWE)
2003 Riva del Garda	United States; Ed Baird; Andy Horton; Tom Burnham; John Ziskind	Australia; James Spithill; Ben Durham; Andy Fethers; Joe Newton	Poland; Karol Jablonski; Grzegorz Baranowski; Piotr Przbylski; Jacek Wysocki
2004 Yekaterinburg	Ed Baird (USA)	Karol Jablonski (POL)	Philippe Presti (FRA)
2005 Calpe	Australia; James Spithill; Andy Fethers; Joe Newton; Michele Ivaldi	United States; Ed Baird	Italy; Pablo Cian

For 2006 onwards, see World Match Racing Tour#World Champions.
