= Miniprio =

Miniprio is a surname. Notable people with the surname include:

- Adam Minoprio (born 1985), New Zealand sailor
- Anthony Minoprio (1900–1988), British architect and town planner
- Minnie Minoprio (born 1942), British actress, singer, and showgirl
