= Francesco Bruni (sailor) =

Italian sailor (born 1973)

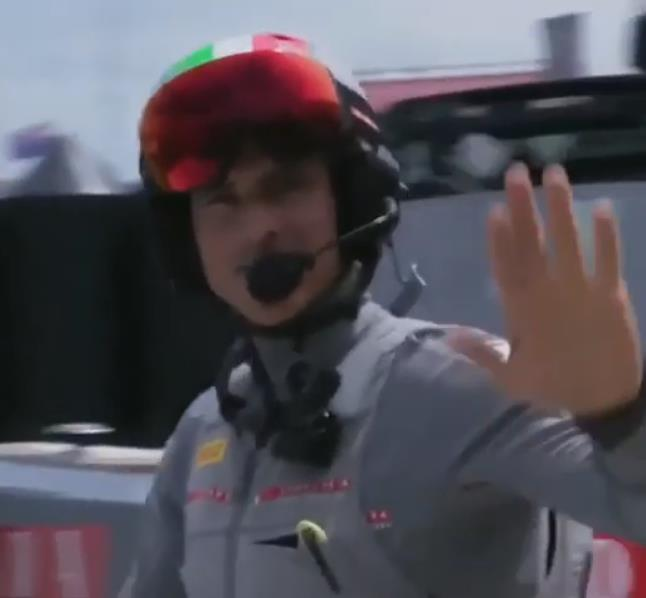
- Francesco Bruni in 2021.

Personal information
- Nationality: Italy
- Born: 11 April 1973 (age 53) Palermo, Italy

Sailing career
- Sport: Sailing
- Classes: Laser (1996 Olympics); 49er (2000 Olympics); Star (2004 Olympics); AC75 (2021 Prada Cup); F50 (Sail GP)

Francesco "Checco" Bruni (born 11 April 1973) is a professional sailor from Italy, together with James Spithill, helmsman of Luna Rossa during the America's Cup 2021.

He is the brother of the sailor Gabriele Bruni with whom he teamed up in 49er regattas during the 2000 Summer Olympics held in Sydney, Australia.

== Biography ==
He has competed in the Summer Olympics three times, all in different classes. He finished 12th at the 1996 Olympics in a Laser, 11th at the 2000 Olympics in a 49er and 7th at the 2004 Olympics in the Star class.

Bruni raced with Luna Rossa Challenge at the 2003 and 2007 Louis Vuitton Cups. He skippered the Azzurra team during the 2009 and 2010 Louis Vuitton Trophy events and with Team Synergy in the 2010 Louis Vuitton Trophy Dubai, before re-joining to Luna Rossa Challenge for the 2011–13 America's Cup World Series and 2013 Louis Vuitton Cup. When Luna Rossa withdrew from the 2017 America's Cup, Bruni joined Artemis Racing for the 2015–16 America's Cup World Series.

He has also won the 2010 Congressional Cup, 2011 Match Race Germany and 2013 King Edward VII Gold Cup.

== Achievements ==
Year	Competition	Venue	Rank	Event	Teammate	Score
1996	Olympic Games	(United States) Atlanta	12th	Laser	Solo	171.0 pts
2000	Olympic Games	(Australia) Sydney	11th	49er	Gabriele Bruni	134.0 pts
2004	Olympic Games	(Greece) Athens	7th	Star	Guido Vignar	75.0 pts

== See also ==
- Luna Rossa Challenge
- 2021 Prada Cup
- Italy at the America's Cup
