= Tomislav Bašić (sailor) =

Croatian sailor (born 1975)

Tomislav Bašić (born 9 January 1975) is a Croatian Olympic sailor that finished 19th in the Men's 470 class at the 2004 Summer Olympics together with Petar Cupać. Bašić won the 2015 Match Race Germany and finished second in the 2013 TP 52 World Championship.
