= 2015 Extreme Sailing Series =

2015 international sailing events

Event title
- Edition: 9th
- Dates: 5 February–13 December 2015
- Yachts: Extreme 40

Results
- Winner: (Oman) The Wave, Muscat

The 2015 Extreme Sailing Series was the ninth edition of the sailing series and the fifth year of it being a fully global event. The series started in Singapore on 5 February 2015 and ended in Sydney, Australia on 13 December 2015 and took place in 8 cities across 3 continents.

== Acts ==
Ports visited

=== Act 1: Singapore ===
For the second time, the first act of the series was held in Singapore between 5–8 February 2015.

=== Act 2: Muscat, Oman ===
The second act of the series was held in Muscat, Oman on the weekend of 11–14 March 2015.

=== Act 3: Qingdao, China ===
Qingdao, China was the host of the third act of the 2015 series, on the weekend of 30 April–3 May 2015.

=== Act 4: Cardiff, UK ===
The fourth act of 2015 was in Cardiff, Wales for the fourth time, but rather than the August Bank Holiday, it was held on the weekend of 18–21 June 2015.

=== Act 5: Hamburg, Germany ===
Hamburg, Germany was a new venue for the series, and was held on 23–26 July 2015.

=== Act 6: Saint Petersburg, Russia ===
The sixth act was held in Saint Petersburg, Russia, a new venue in the Extreme Sailing Series. It was held on the weekend of 20–23 August 2015.

=== Act 7: Istanbul, Turkey ===
The seventh act took place in Istanbul, Turkey on the weekend of 1–4 October 2015.

=== Act 8: Sydney, Australia ===
Act 8 was held on the weekend of 10–13 December 2015 in Sydney, Australia. This was the second year that Sydney hosted the series.

== Results ==
Results as of 13 December 2015.

Rank	Team	Act 1	Act 2	Act 3	Act 4	Act 5	Act 6	Act 7	Act 8	Overall points
1	(Oman) The Wave, Muscat	8	10	9	10	10	10	10	20	87
2	(Denmark) SAP Extreme Sailing Team	9	9	10	8	RDG	3	8	18	74
3	(Austria) Red Bull Sailing Team	10	8	7	9	7	8	5	16	70
4	Oman Air	6	7	5	5	6	6	9	14	58
5	Gazprom Team Russia	7	3	8	6	9	5	3	10	51
6	(Turkey) TeamTurx	3	6	6	4	5	4	4	12	44
7	(United Kingdom) GAC Pindar	5	5	4	7	3	7	6	6	43
8	(Italy) Lino Sonego Team Italia	4	4	3	3	4	9	7	8	42
9	Team Extreme Germany	1	-	1	-	1	-	-	-	3

RDG = Redress given
