= GAC Pindar =

Professional sailing team

- GAC Pindar

Career
- Established: 2011
- Nation: Great Britain
- Skipper: Ian Williams
- Notable victories: 2015 World Match Racing Tour

Yachts
- Sail no.: Boat name

GAC Pindar is a professional sailing team that competes in a variety of sailing competitions including the Extreme Sailing Series, M32's and the World Match Racing Tour.

GAC Pindar was established in 2011 and is headquartered in Southampton.

== Extreme Sailing Series ==
GAC Pindar has been competing in the Extreme Sailing Series since 2011, and came 5th in 2012, 6th in 2013 and 11th in 2014.
