= DS 37 Match Racer =

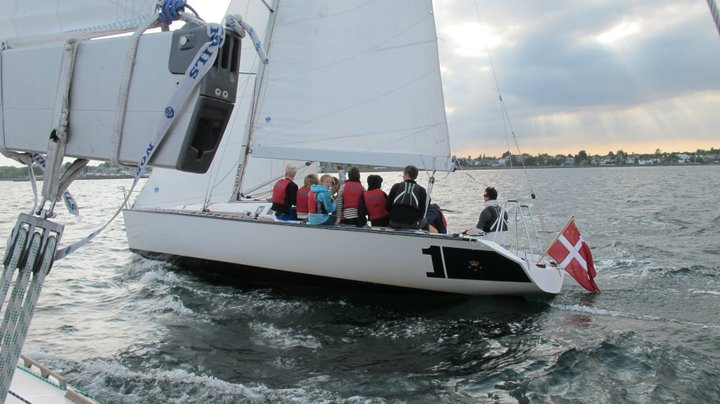
- The DS 37 Match Racer

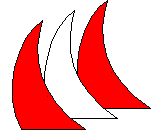
- Class Symbol

Development
- Designer: Jacob Vierø
- Year: 1991

Boat
- Crew: 5-6
- Draft: 2.15 m (7 ft 1 in)

Hull
- Hull weight: 3,900 kg (8,600 lb)
- LOA: 11.25 m (36.9 ft)
- LWL: 9.35 m (30.7 ft)
- Beam: 3.23 m (10.6 ft)

Hull appendages
- Ballast: 1,900 kg (4,200 lb)

Sails
- Mainsail area: 35.9 m^{2} (386 sq ft)
- Jib/genoa area: 24.4 m^{2} (263 sq ft)
- Spinnaker area: 87 m^{2} (940 sq ft)

The DS 37 Match Racer is a 11.25-metre (36.9 ft) long sloop rigged sailboat, designed by Jacob Vierø in 1991 and used in the Stena Match Cup Sweden, part of the World Match Racing Tour. The design of the boat emphasizes that it is used for match racing, with an oversized rudder, and simple controls. The boat is popular as a teaching boat for beginners as well because of its simplicity and robustness. However, in Match racing, it is one of the most physically demanding boats found in the international matchracing circuit. The boat is used mainly in the Scandinavian countries, where it can be found as inventory of several of the big yacht clubs, such as the Royal Danish Yacht Club or the Royal Gothenburg Yacht Club.
