= Gyula Alpári =

Hungarian Communist politician and propagandist

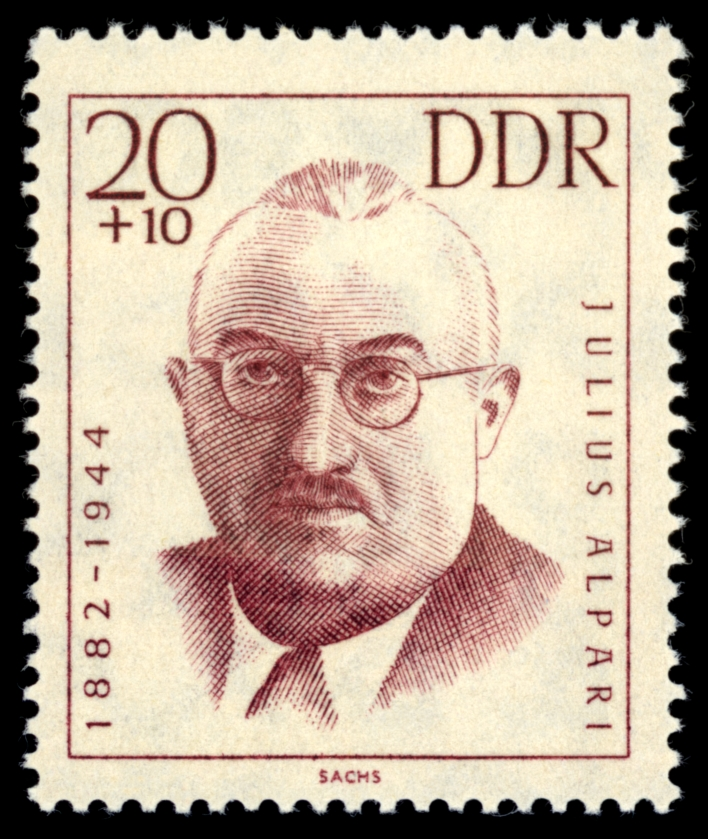
Stamps of Germany(DDR)1962,MiNr 0921.jpg

Gyula Alpári (19 January 1882, in Dunaföldvár – 17 July 1944, in Sachsenhausen) was a Hungarian Communist politician and propagandist, as well as a journalist by profession.

== Career ==
=== Hungary and Russia ===
Alpári participated as a leader of the Hungarian Revolution of 1919. After the fall of the Hungarian Soviet Republic, he fled to Soviet Russia and became an official of the Communist International.

=== Germany ===
In the 1920s and early 30s, Alpári was active in Germany, where he was editor in chief on the Comintern’s German-language periodical InPreKorr (Internationale Presse Korrespondenz).

=== Trotskyist ===
In the late 1920s, Alpári had a political clash with Béla Kun, the main leader of the Hungarian Communists. He was accused of being a "Trotskyist", but evaded the Stalinist repression as the political tension was growing in Germany with the rise of fascism.

=== France and death ===
When the Nazis took power in 1933, Alpári fled to France. After the Nazi invasion in 1940, Alpári was arrested by Gestapo in Paris and taken to the concentration camp in Sachsenhausen, where he was shot in 1944.

== Propaganda activities ==
Alpari worked with Willi Münzenberg, chief of Comintern propaganda in Western Europe.

=== Sacco and Vanzetti trial ===
Alpari came to the U.S. in 1927 to lead Communist efforts to propagandize the Sacco and Vanzetti trial.

=== Whittaker Chambers ===
Several authors believe that Alpari was the high-level communist whom Whittaker Chambers describes in his 1952 memoir, Witness:

I did most of my reading about the Hungarian Revolution at my desk in the newspaper room of the New York Public Library... One night, when I was absorbed in Bela Szanto, I suddenly became aware that a little man was standing beside me... He was short, dark, and dressed quietly with an air of extreme tidiness.His eyes were black, intelligent, friendly and fearless... This chance meeting was of the utmost importance to me... What my Hungarian comrade said to me, more impressively than any words he spoke, was that my vision of the Communists was not mistaken.He embodied it. He was it... I was not alone.

Maria Schmidt writes, "According to some sources [whom she does name or cite]... Gyula Alpari travelled to New York to take charge of the action there... We recall the mysterious Hungarian Communist, chambers 'mentor'... It is not unlikely that the man was Gyula Alpari..."

Stephan Koch writes, "It is through Whittaker Chambers that we know of the man's presence,... If this New York Comintern rep was (as I think probable) Alpari, it would suggest that both Whittaker Chambers and Kim Philby had been enlisted with the assistance of the same member of the 'Hungarian Mafia.'"

== Sources ==
- Borsanyi, György The life of a Communist revolutionary, Béla Kun: Distributed by Columbia University Press, 1993.
