= Marathonbet =

Sports betting company

- Company type: Private
- Industry: Online gaming
- Genre: Betting, Bookmaker
- Founded: 1997
- Key people: Natalia Zavodnik (CEO)
- Products: Sports betting, Online casino
- Website: https://www.marathonbet.com

Established in 1997, Marathonbet is a global online sports betting company offering pre-match and live betting markets across a range of sports and live events through its online sportsbook and casino products.

== Operations ==
Marathonbet was started in the CIS (Commonwealth of Independent States) in 1997 and became one of the first betting operators to launch an online service in 2002.

In 2013, the company launched a mobile app sportsbook for Android, iOS and tablet devices.

In September 2017 Marathonbet announced Natalia Zavodnik as their new chief executive, replacing the previous executive Viktor Hoffmann who retired the same year.

In April 2022 Marathonbet announced the company will be withdrawing their UK website and operations from the 14th of April 2022.

Companies operating under the Marathonbet brand are licensed in Alderney, Italy, Spain, Denmark and Curacao.

== Partnerships ==
Over the years, Marathonbet signed numerous sponsorship deals with football teams, including but not limited to:

- Fulham F.C. (2013)
- West Ham United F.C. (2014)
- Hibernian F.C. (2014)
- Derby County F.C. (2014)
- Tottenham Hotspur F.C. (2014)
- Girona FC (2015)
- Liverpool F.C. (2015)
- Middlesbrough F.C. (2015)
- Manchester United F.C. (2015)
- Málaga CF (2016)
- Manchester City F.C. (2018)
- SS Lazio (2018)
- Sevilla FC (2019)
- Real Madrid CF (2019)

In October 2020, Marathonbet announced a partnership with Spanish iGaming provider MGA Games.
