= Peter Gilmour =

Australian sailing skipper (born 1960)

Personal information
- Born: 25 January 1960 (age 66)

Sailing career
- Sport: Sailing
- Class: IACC
Medal record
World Championships
Gold medal – first place	1990 Auckland	Match racing
Gold medal – first place	1997 Marstrand	Match racing
Gold medal – first place	1998 Hayama	Match racing
Gold medal – first place	2006	Match racing

Peter Gilmour (born 25 January 1960) is an Australian sailing skipper. Gilmour is an America's Cup veteran and was named Western Australian Sportsman of the Year in 1987. He is also a 4 time World Match racing Tour Champion. He currently resides in Perth, Western Australia.

Gilmour started sailing at the age of seven on Perth's Swan River, and he competed in his first world championship at the age of 16, finishing 21st. Gilmour's performance continued to improve as his experience with the different disciplines of sailing increased.

Gilmour has since been through four other America's Cup teams since the Kookaburra days, most recently with Ernesto Bertarelli's Alinghi Team winners of the 32nd America's Cup.

Peter Gilmour has sailed in everything from dinghies to offshore yachts, having competed in both the Sydney–Hobart and Fastnet races, but has settled on match-racing as his chosen field.

== World Match Racing Tour ==
Peter was the first repeat champion of the World Match Racing Tour. He won the 2003–04 Swedish Match Tour championship with 150 points. He followed that up with a come-from-behind victory in 2004–05. Peter trailed by 23 points beginning the second half of the season, but closed with a string of 2-1-1-1 to complete the comeback. He then went on to be crowned Tour Champion again in 2005–06. Gilmour is one of the most respected, feared, and knowledgeable competitors on World Match Racing Tour, being a three-time World Champion of Match Race Sailing.

That knowledge comes not only from years on the match-race circuit, but also five different syndicates for the America's Cup. Gilmour's Cup career began with the 1987 defense in Perth, Western Australia, when he was the starting helmsman for Kevin Parry's Kookaburra syndicate, which ultimately lost the America's Cup.

During the Australian trials to select the Cup defender, Gilmour used the racing rules to his advantage and drew countless protests on his rivals. The members of the International Jury often found themselves sorting out protests well past when everyone had left the media center. Sometimes their decisions overturned previous day's results, which created chaos with the defense trials.

Gilmour's actions would ultimately lead to the creation of the Match Racing Rules, an appendix to the Racing Rules of Sailing. The goal of the new rules was to decide on-the-water infractions immediately through umpires in chase boats or on the competing boats.

Gilmour was also inducted as the 2009 Chairman of the World Yacht Racing Forum.

== Peter Gilmour in match racing ==
World Match Racing Tour results

- 2009 – 4th overall
- 2008 – 8th overall
- 2006–07 – 5th overall
- 2005–06 – 1st, Tour Champion
- 2004–05 – 1st, Tour Champion
- 2003–04 – 1st, Tour Champion
- 2000–01 – 6th overall
- 2000 – 4th overall

=== 2010 ===
- 10th – Stena Match Cup Sweden '10
  - Crew: Kazuhiko Sofuku, Cameron Dunn, Yasuhiro Yaji, Thierry Douillard
- 1st – Portimão Portugal Match Cup '10
  - Crew: Kazuhiko Sofuku, Cameron Dunn, Yasuhiro Yaji, Thierry Douillard
- 5th – Korea Match Cup '10
  - Crew: Martin Berntson, Cameron Dunn, Yasuhiro Yaji, Thierry Douillard
- 6th – Match Race Germany '10
  - Crew: Martin Berntson, Nils Bjerkäs, Yasuhiro Yaji, Cristian Pontin
- 11th – Match Race France '10
  - Crew: Thierry Douillard, Yashuri Yaji, David Gilmour

=== 2009 ===
- 3rd – Match Race Germany
- 6th – Korea Match Cup
- 6th – Troia Portugal Match Cup
- 1st – Match Cup Sweden
- 7th – St. Moritz Match Race
- 3rd – Danish Open
- 3rd – Monsoon Cup

=== 2008 ===
- 1st – Monsoon Cup '08
  - Crew: Kazuhiko Sofuku, Thierry Douliard, Yasuhiro Yaji, Rod Dawson
- 5th – Match Cup Sweden '08
  - Crew: Johnnie Berntson, Thierry Douliard, Yasuhiro Yaji, Nick Blackman
- 9th – Korea Match Cup '08
  - Crew: Yasuhiro Yaji, Thierry Douillard, Tim Castles, Mark O'Toole

=== 2006–07 ===
- 2nd – Monsoon Cup '07
  - Crew: Rod Dawson, Kazuhiko Sofuku, Yasuhiro Yaji, Christian Scherrer
- 9th – Latium Match Cup '07
  - Crew: Rod Dawson, Kazuhiko Sofuku, Yasuhiro Yaji, Zach Murst
- 1st – Troia Portugal Match Cup
  - Crew: Rod Dawson, Kazuhiko Sofuku, Yasuhiro Yaji, Zach Murst
- 4th – Monsoon Cup '06
  - Crew: Rick Brent, Christian Scherrer, Graeme Spence, Yasuhiro Yaji
- 6th – Allianz Cup '06
  - Crew: Bill Colombo, Keith Love, Sean Svendsen, Yasuhiro Yaji
- 9th – St. Moritz Match Race '06
  - Crew: David Gilmour, Graeme Spence
- 3rd – Portugal Match Cup '06
  - Crew: Rod Dawson, Christian Scherrer, Ed Smyth, Yasuhiro Yaji

=== 2005–06 ===
- 1st – Monsoon Cup '05
  - Crew: Rod Dawson, Kazuhiko Sofuku, Yasuhiro Yaji, Tatsuya Wakinaga
- 1st – Match Race Germany '06
  - Crew: Rod Dawson, Jan Reblin, Christian Scherrer, Yasuhiro Yaji
- 3rd – PT Portugal Match Cup '05
  - Crew: Frederico Cerveira, Thierry Fouchier, Fred Guilmin, Yasuhiro Yaji
- 3rd – ACI Match Race Cup '06
  - Crew: Rod Dawson, Thierry Douillard, Kazuhiko Sofuku, Yasuhiro Yaji
- 6th – St. Moritz Match Race '05
  - Crew: Teague Czislowski, David Gilmour

=== 2004–05 ===
- 1st – Swedish Match Cup '05
  - Crew: Rod Dawson, Mike Mottl, Kazuhiko Sofuku, Yasuhiro Yaji
- 1st – ACI H1 Match Race Cup '05
  - Crew: Rod Dawson, Mike Mottl, Kazuhiko Sofuku, Yasuhiro Yaji
- 1st – Match Race Germany '05
  - Crew: Rod Dawson, Mike Mottl, Kazuhiko Sofuku, Yasuhiro Yaji
- 2nd – Toscana Elba Cup – Trofeo Locman '05
  - Crew: Rod Dawson, Mike Mottl, Kazuhiko Sofuku, Yasuhiro Yaji
- 4th – Nippon Cup '04
  - Crew: Mike Mottl, Kazuhiko Sofuku, Yasuhiro Yaji
- 5th – Portugal Match Cup '04
  - Crew: Rod Dawson, Mike Mottl, Kazuhiko Sofuku, Yasuhiro Yaji
- 5th – Danish Open '04
  - Crew: Rod Dawson, Mike Mottl, Alan Smith, Yasuhiro Yaji
- 5th – King Edward VII Gold Cup '04
  - Crew: Mike Mottl, Kazuhiko Sofuku, Yasuhiro Yaji

=== 2003–04 ===
- 1st – Investors Guaranty Presentation of the King Edward VII Gold Cup '03
- 1st – Nippon Cup '03
- 1st – Match Race Germany '04
- 2nd – Swedish Match Cup '04
- 2nd – Toscana Elba Cup – Trofeo Locman '04
- 2nd – ACI HTmobile Cup '04
- 3rd – Danish Open '03
- 4th – Congressional Cup '04

=== 2002–03 ===
- 4th – UBS Challenge '02
- 7th – Swedish Match Cup '03

=== 2000–01 ===
- 1st – Sun Microsystems Australia Cup '01
- 5th – Trofeo Challenge Roberto Trombini '00
- 5th – Colorcraft Gold Cup '00
- 11th – Swedish Match Cup '01

=== 2000 ===
- 2nd – ACI Cup/World Championship of Match Racing '00
- 5th – Trofeo Challenge Roberto Trombini '00
- 5th – Colorcraft Gold Cup '00
- 6th – Swedish Match Cup '00
- 8th – Sun Microsystems Australia Cup '00
- 8th – Match Race Germany '00

=== America's Cup affiliation ===
- Alinghi – coach, America's Cup winner (2007)
- OneWorld Challenge – skipper, 3rd place in the 2003 Louis Vuitton Cup
- Nippon Challenge – skipper, 4th place in the 2000 Louis Vuitton Cup
- Nippon Challenge – coach, 4th place in the 1995 Louis Vuitton Cup
- Spirit of Australia – helmsman, 6th place in the 1992 Louis Vuitton Cup
- Kookaburra Syndicate – helmsman, lost the 1987 America's Cup to Stars & Stripes
