= Ed Baird =

American sailor

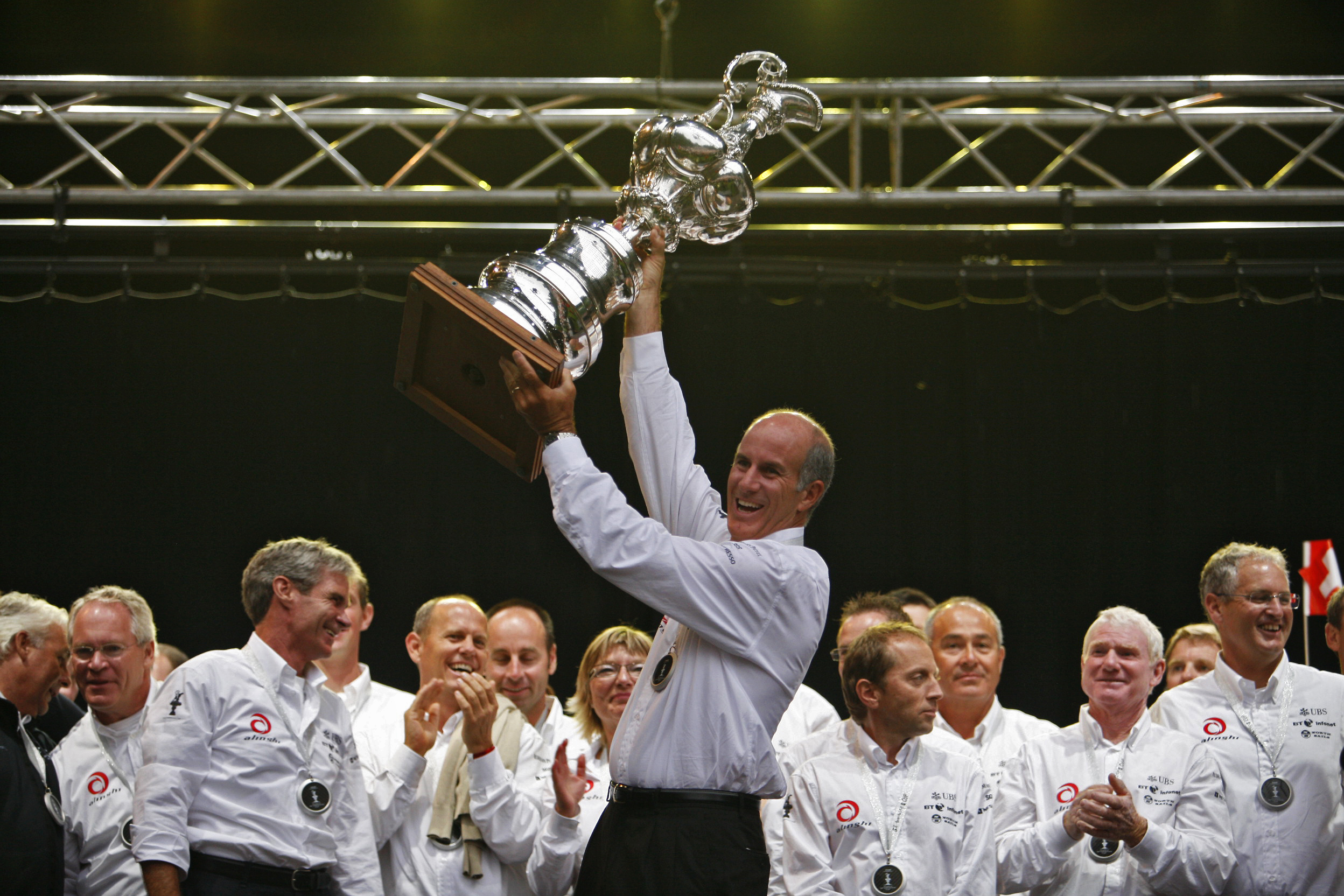
- Baird with the America's Cup in Geneva, Switzerland

Personal information
- Full name: Phillip Edward Baird
- Born: May 17, 1958 (age 68) St. Petersburg, Florida, U.S.

Sailing career
- Sport: Sailing
- College team: University of South Florida
Medal record
Sailing
Representing United States
World Championships
Gold medal – first place	2013 Miami	TP 52
Gold medal – first place	2011 Porto Cervo	TP 52
Silver medal – second place	2005 Calpe	Match Racing
Gold medal – first place	2004 Yekaterinburg	Match Racing
Gold medal – first place	2003 Riva del Garda	Match Racing
Silver medal – second place	1997 Gothenburg	Match Racing
Silver medal – second place	1996 Dubrovnik	Match Racing
Gold medal – first place	1995 Auckland	Match Racing
Silver medal – second place	1993 Perth	Match Racing
Gold medal – first place	1983 Malmö	J/24
Gold medal – first place	1980 Canada	Laser

Phillip Edward "Ed" Baird (born May 17, 1958) is an American sailor. He was a coach of the 1995 America's Cup-winning Team New Zealand and a helmsman for the 2007 America's Cup-winning Alinghi syndicate.

Growing up in Florida, Baird raced in the Optimist class at junior level, before moving onto other dinghies. He won the World Laser Championships in 1980 and the World J/24 Championships in 1983.

== Coaching career ==
Baird joined Team New Zealand as a coach for the 1995 America's Cup, guiding the syndicate to New Zealand's first ever Cup win. In the same year, he won the World Match Racing Championships, and was named the US's Yachtsman of the Year.

In 1999, he skippered Young America in the Louis Vuitton series to determine the challenger for the following year's America's Cup, but the syndicate's challenge faltered when one of its two yachts nearly sank in a race against a Japanese team.

== Racing highlights ==
Baird has also ventured into open water racing, having competed in round the world races in 1997–98 (for Innovation Kvaerner) and 2001–02 (for Djuice Dragons). As part of these offshore racing challenges, Baird was a member of the winning team in the grueling, Sydney to Hobart Race in 2000, aboard the maxi yacht, Nicorette II.

As the helmsman of the Alinghi team for the 2007 America's Cup, he led the syndicate to win the series 5-2 against his former team, Team New Zealand. Later in 2007, he was named the International Sailing Federation's male World Sailor of the Year.

Winning 4 of 5 events, Baird skippered Alinghi’s Extreme 40 to a dominant win on the iShares Extreme-40 Catamaran Circuit in 2008. He then coached team owner, Ernesto Bertarelli, who helmed the massive catamaran, Alinghi 5 in the 2010 America's Cup.

From 2011 to 2016, Baird skippered the US-flagged, Quantum Racing TP 52 to win four seasons of the Audi MedCup/52 Super Series and three TP 52 World Championships. Baird currently races on international circuits for the TP 52 and RC 44 .

While best known as a champion match racer and fleet racing helmsman, Baird has also coached world and Olympic champions such as Anna Tunnicliffe, Sally Barkow and Kevin Mahaney. He was a premier instructor for North-U’s Tactical and speed clinics in the 1990s, and he has written an instructional book (Laser Racing) and over a hundred tactical how-to articles. Baird has worked with ESPN, Outdoor Life Network, Versus, and Television New Zealand as an expert commentator for shows about sailboat racing.

Baird was inducted into the National Sailing Hall of Fame in 2016, and he was inducted into the America's Cup Hall of Fame in 2021.
