= Nicolai Sehested =

Danish sailor

Personal information
- Nationality: Danish
- Born: 6 November 1989 (age 36) Copenhagen, Denmark
- Height: 1.83 m (6 ft 0 in)
- Weight: 82 kg (181 lb)

Sailing career
- Sport: Sailing
- Class: F50

Nicolai Sehested (born 6 November 1989) is a Danish competitive sailor. He has twice sailed in The Ocean Race. Since 2020 Sehested has been the driver of Rockwool Racing SailGP Team.

== Career ==
Since 2010 Sehested has competed in World Match Racing Tour as founder and skipper of Ewii Racing (formerly Trefor Racing).

Additionally, he won the Maxi Yacht Rolex Cup in the Wally class in 2018 and 2019 with Team Lyra.

For the 2014–2015 Volvo Ocean Race Sehested sailed with Team Vestas Wind. In 2017 as part of the 2017–2018 Volvo Ocean Race he sailed for Team Akzonobel.

In 2019 Sehested was announced as the new driver for the new Denmark SailGP Team.
