= Alpari =

Foreign exchange broker

- Company type: Private
- Industry: Financial services
- Founded: December 1998
- Founder: Andrey Dashin
- Headquarters: Fomboni, Mohéli, Comoros
- Area served: Worldwide
- Products: Retail foreign exchange, CFDs
- Owner: Andrey Dashin (brand owner)
- Parent: Parlance Trading Ltd
- Website: alpari.com

Alpari is a retail broker offering trading in the foreign exchange (forex) and contracts for difference (CFDs). The brand was founded in 1998 in Kazan, Russia, by entrepreneur Andrey Dashin. The brand has operated in a number of jurisdictions under local entities. As of 2025, Alpari’s international services are provided by Parlance Trading Ltd, licensed by the Mwali International Services Authority on the Comoros island of Mohéli.

Alpari previously operated regulated subsidiaries in the United Kingdom and United States, both of which ceased activity in 2015, and a licensed entity in Russia whose Bank of Russia license was annulled in 2018 with effect from January 2019.

== History ==
The business began in Kazan, Russia, in 1998 and expanded internationally in the early 2000s.

=== United Kingdom (2004–2015) ===
Alpari (UK) Limited was authorised by the Financial Services Authority (later the FCA) in 2006 and offered FX/CFD trading and, for UK residents, financial spread betting. In May 2010 the firm was fined £140,000 for anti-money-laundering systems and controls failings; its former MLRO was separately fined £14,000.

On 15 January 2015 the Swiss National Bank removed its franc/euro cap, causing extreme FX volatility. The following day Alpari (UK) announced insolvency; on 19 January 2015 the English High Court appointed special administrators from KPMG under the Special administration|Special Administration Regime. At the time, Alpari (UK) was principal shirt sponsor of West Ham United F.C. (2013–2015).

Alpari also operated a Cyprus office in 2010–2013; its Cyprus Investment Firm authorisation (Alpari Financial Services Ltd, CIF 129/10) was voluntarily renounced in December 2012 and the office closed in early 2013.

=== Russia (2008–2019) ===
The Russian entity Alpari Forex LLC obtained a local Forex dealer licence after Russia introduced licensing for retail FX in 2016–2017. On 27 December 2018, the Bank of Russia announced it was annulling the licences of five FX dealers — including Alpari Forex — with effect from 27 January 2019, citing repeated violations of securities law.

=== United States (2006–2015) ===
Alpari (US), LLC became a member of the National Futures Association in 2007. Its NFA membership was revoked in April 2015, ending its ability to operate in the United States.

=== Corporate structure and jurisdictions ===
Alpari has operated using several entities over time. In November 2018, industry media reported that the Belize subsidiary was being closed with clients migrated to a Saint Vincent and the Grenadines entity.

From 2020 the brand’s international operations were marketed alongside FXTM under the Exinity umbrella. In July 2025, industry outlets reported that the Alpari brand’s management had been separated from Exinity and placed with Parlance Trading Ltd, a Mohéli (Comoros) company; Alpari’s website lists Parlance Trading Ltd (T2023236) as the operating licence and provides a Mohéli address.

=== India ===
Since September 2022, Alpari is included on the Reserve Bank of India's alert list of unauthorized online forex-trading platforms operating in the country.

== Former research entity in the UK ==
Alpari previously operated an UK-based market analysis entity Alpari Research & Analysis Ltd, which was dissolved in March 2020.

== See also ==
- List of companies of the Comoros
- Foreign exchange market
