= Peter Holmberg =

US Virgin Islands sailor

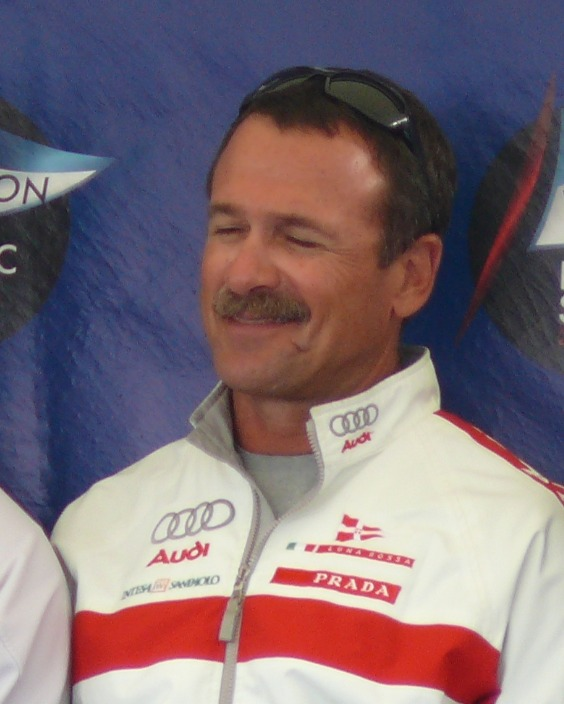
- Holmberg in 2009

Medal record

Men's sailing

Representing U.S. Virgin Islands

Olympic Games
| Silver medal – second place | 1988 Seoul | Finn class |

Peter William Holmberg (born October 4, 1960) is a sailor from the U.S. Virgin Islands, who won a silver medal in Men's Finn class at the 1988 Summer Olympics. Holmberg is the first and only Virgin Islander to earn an Olympic medal so far. He was born on Saint Thomas.
