= Björn Hansen =

Swedish sailor competing in match racing (born 1967)

Personal information
- Born: 17 February 1967 (age 59)

Sailing career
- Sport: Sailing

Björn Hansen (born 17 February 1967) is a Swedish sailor competing in match racing. He is a five-time winner of the Stena Match Cup Sweden in Marstrand, Sweden. His nickname is Piccolo Urso.
