= Johnie Berntsson =

Swedish sailor

Johnie Berntsson (born 11 August 1972) is a Swedish sailor competing in match racing.

Berntsson finished 3rd overall on the 2011 World Match Racing Tour and was awarded the title Swedish Sailor of the Year.
