= Taylor Canfield =

American match racing sailor

Personal information
- Born: February 5, 1989 (age 37)

Sailing career
- Sport: Sailing
- College team: Boston College
- Classes: J/70, Melges 24, Vanguard 15, 470, Foiling50, 420, Etchells, IOD

Taylor Canfield (born February 5, 1989) is a United States Virgin Islands sailor competing in match racing. As of November 29, 2023, he is the driver of the United States SailGP Team following the sale of the team.

He won the ICSA Match Racing National Championship with Boston College in 2010 and 2011, and the 2013 World Match Racing Tour and became 2013 World Champion in match racing.

Canfield was widely expected to skipper the Stars & Stripes Team USA America's Cup campaign as the designated sailing representative of California's Long Beach Yacht Club; however, that team withdrew prior to the commencement of the Prada Cup challengers’ selection process.

Taylor Canfield won the 2020 Bermuda Gold Cup and Open Match Racing World Championship.
