= Adam Minoprio =

New Zealand sailor

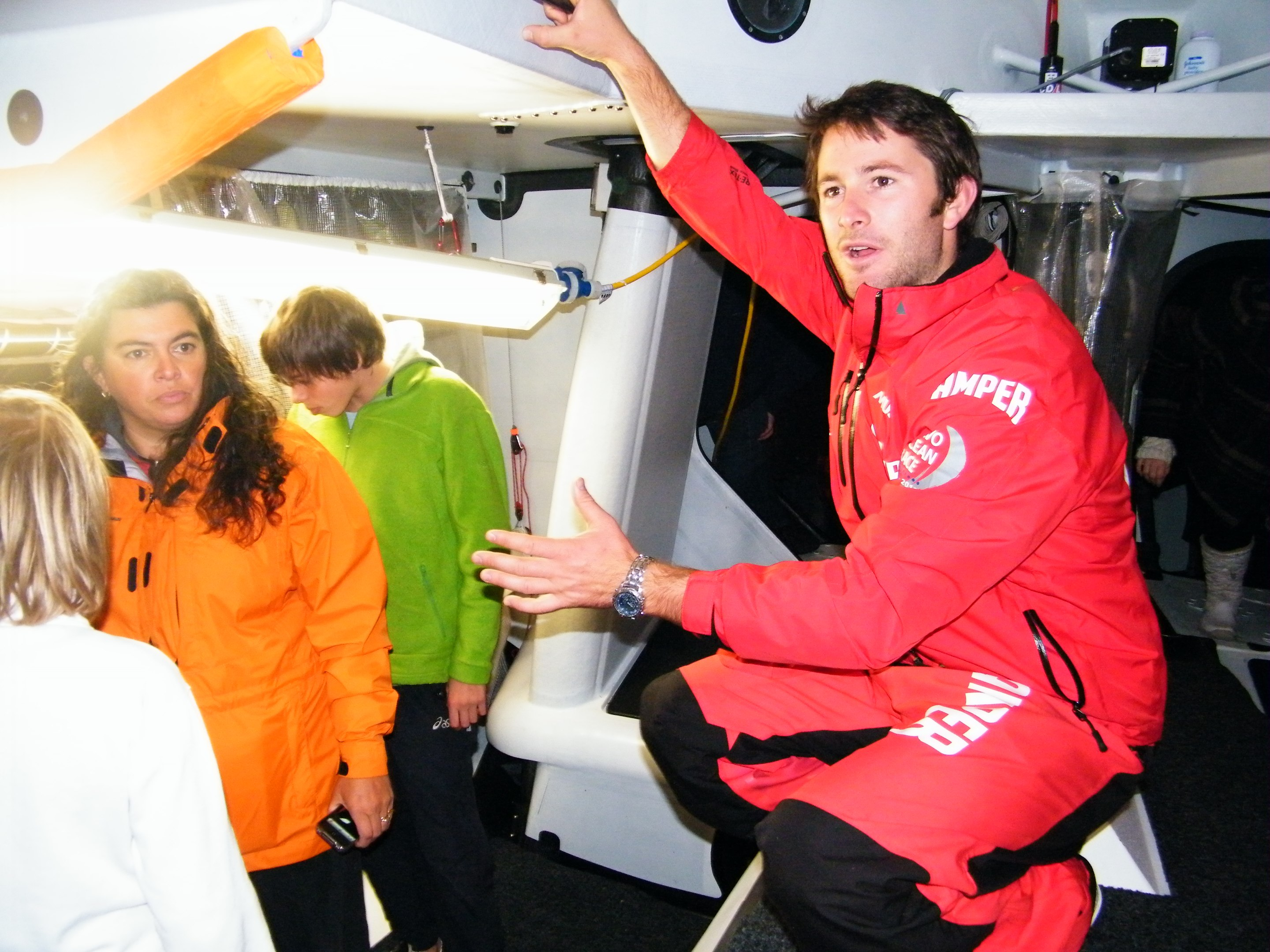

Personal information
- Born: 19 June 1985 (age 41) Whangārei, New Zealand

Sailing career
- Sport: Sailing

Adam Minoprio (born 19 June 1985) is a New Zealand sailor.

He is the youngest winner of the NZ Optimist Nationals at 11 years of age in 1997. Won the New Zealand P Class Tanner Cup in 2001. Did the Royal New Zealand Yacht Squadrons Youth Programme. In 2009 displaced James Spithill as the youngest World Match racing Tour Champion beating Sir Ben Ainslie in the finals. 2009 won Yachting New Zealand Performance award. 2010 won Yachting New Zealand sailor of the year. He has competed in two Volvo Ocean Races; in 2011–12 on Camper Lifelovers and in 2014–15 on Team Brunel. He spent time with Luna Rossa Challenge, until they withdrew from the 2017 America's Cup. He has sailed SAP Extreme Sailing Team in the Extreme Sailing Series. winning the 2017 series championship.

He sailed for Groupama Team France during the 2015–16 America's Cup World Series and helmed their second boat at the 2017 America's Cup.
