= World Match Racing Tour =

Sailing series

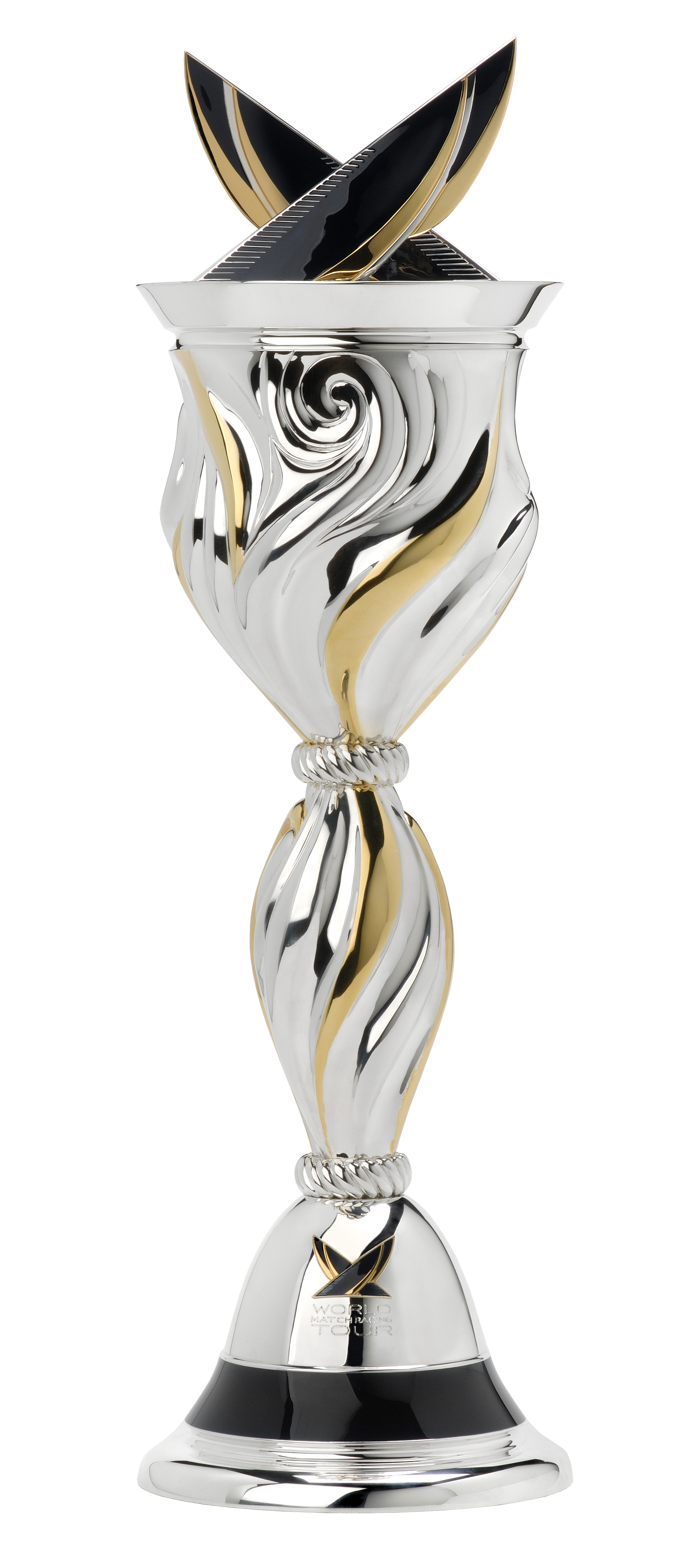
- World Match Racing Tour
- Formerly: Swedish Match Tour
- First held: 2001
- Type: match-racing tour
- Champions: Torvar Mirsky (2017)
- Most titles: Ian Williams (5)
- Website: www.wmrt.com

The World Match Racing Tour (or WMRT) is, since 2000, an annual series of professional sailing match race events held in multiple countries. Since 2006, the winner of the WMRT series has been named the Match Racing World Champion.

Throughout the course of the Tour, participating teams compete in various boats, with each event featuring identical boat models. Teams regularly switch boats during the competition, emphasizing the importance of the sailors' skill and strategic abilities.

== History ==
=== Foundation of the World Match Racing Tour ===
The World Match Racing Tour in its current format started in the year 2000. However, many of its regattas started earlier, for example, the King Edward VII Gold Cup (now known as the Argo Group Gold Cup) in 1937 with American Briggs Cunningham as the first winner.

During the mid-1990s, match racing received greater interest and Fabergé, the cosmetic manufacturer, used the brand Brut to form a match racing series. The series offered US$250,000 of prize money, the highest prize awarded in sailing regattas. To win the big prize – and the Fabergé egg, the competitor had to win three out of five regattas in Bermuda, San Francisco, New York, Lymington and Séte – the Brut Cup.

In 1997, Russell Coutts and his Team Magic won the Fabergé Egg and the US$250,000 prize money. Brut left as a sponsor after that, leaving the match racing series in a state of limbo. Swedish Match took over as sponsor of the match racing series in 1998 and the creation of the Swedish Match Grand Prix Sailing began.

=== Swedish Match Tour (2000–2006) ===
In 2000, the Swedish Match Tour (formerly known as the Swedish Match Grand Prix Sailing) was awarded Special Event status by the International Sailing Federation. Bertrand Pacé was the winner of the tour. In 2005, the first Asian event in the match racing circuit – Monsoon Cup – was added and marked the 50th event on the Swedish Match Tour.

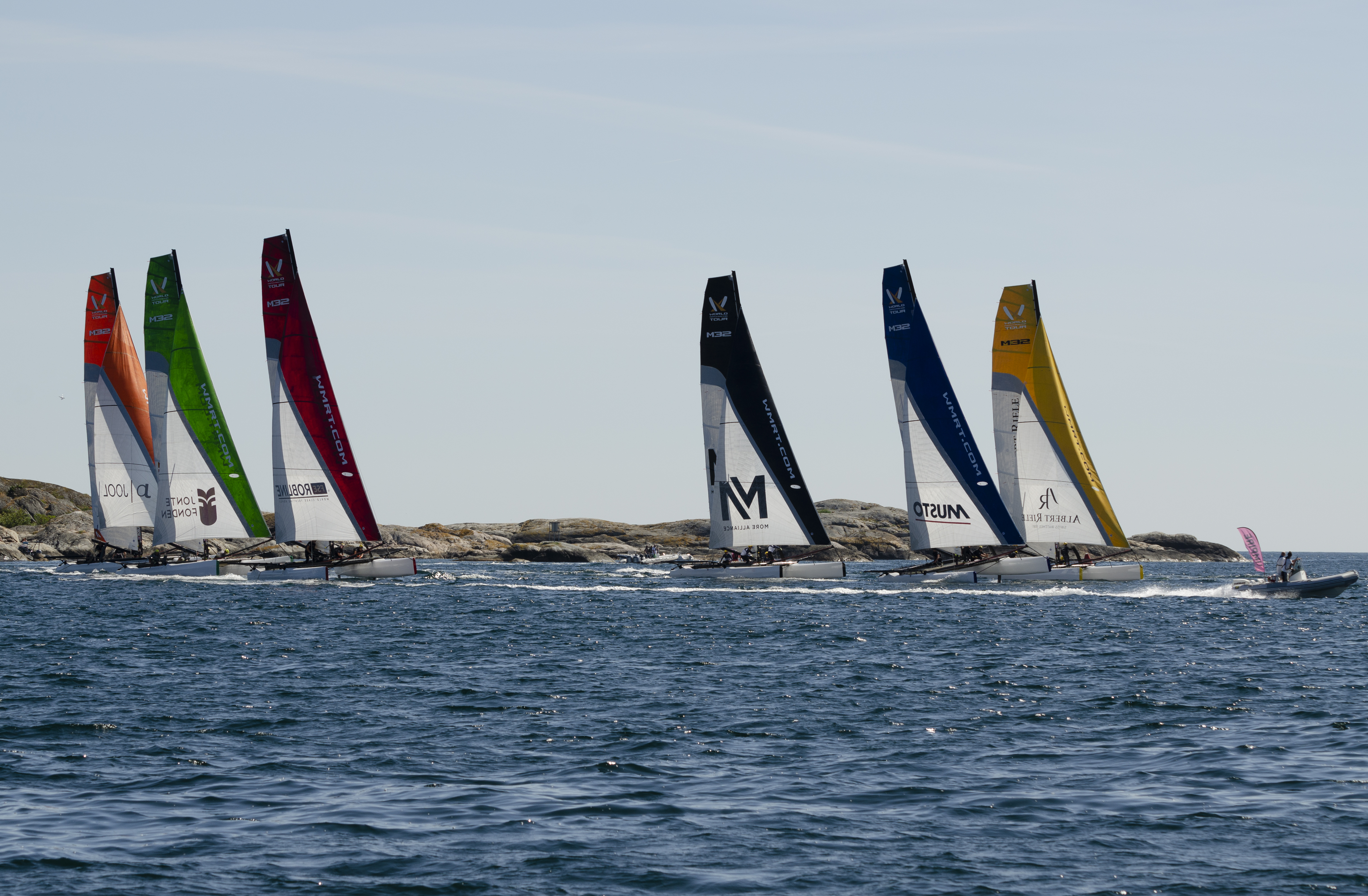
M32s in Match Cup Norway 2018.

=== World Championship (2006–present) ===
In 2006, following the departure of title sponsor Swedish Match AB, the Swedish Match Tour was renamed the World Match Racing Tour and gained status as the World Championship in match racing. The Korea Match Cup joined the World Match Racing Tour in 2008. Great Britain's Royal Jeweler's, Garrard & Co. created the World Match Racing Tour trophy in 2011. In 2012, ALPARI UK Ltd became the title sponsor of the tour – renaming it as the Apari World Match Racing Tour.

In 2015, the tour adopted a new format where competitions were grouped into two categories: World Championship events giving more points and World Tour events giving less points in the tour standings. For the 2016 tour, M32 became the equipment used.

== Sponsorship ==
The World Match Racing Tour has been sponsored since 2000. The title sponsorship enables the tour's sponsorship name. There have been two sponsors since the tour's formation.

Year	Sponsor
1998–1999	none (Swedish Match Grand Prix Sailing)
2000–2006	Swedish Match (Swedish Match Tour)
2006–2011	No sponsor (World Match Racing Tour)
2012–2015	Alpari Group (Alpari World Match Racing Tour)
2015–current	No sponsor (World Match Racing Tour)

== Winners ==
Year	Winner	Team
2000	Bertrand Pacé	Team New Zealand
2000–01	Magnus Holmberg	Team Stora Enso
2001–02	Peter Holmberg	Oracle BMW Racing
2002–03	Jesper Radich	Team Radich
2003–04	Peter Gilmour	Pizza-La Sailing Team
2004–05	Peter Gilmour	Pizza-La Sailing Team
2005–06	Peter Gilmour	Pizza-La Sailing Team
2006–07	Ian Williams	Team Pindar
2008	Ian Williams	Bahrain Team Pindar
2009	Adam Minoprio	BlackMatch Racing
2010	Ben Ainslie	Team Origin
2011	Ian Williams	Team GAC Pindar
2012	Ian Williams	GAC Pindar
2013	Taylor Canfield	USOne
2014	Ian Williams	GAC Pindar
2015	Ian Williams	GAC Pindar
2016	Phil Robertson	Phil Robertson Racing
2017	Torvar Mirsky	Mirsky Racing Team
2019	Phil Robertson	ChinaOne Ningbo
2020	Taylor Canfield	Stars + Stripes Team USA
2022	Nick Egnot-Johnson	Knots Racing NZL
2023	Ian Williams	ChinaOne Ningbo
2024	Ian Williams	Pindar by Manuport Logistics
2025	Ian Williams	Pindar by Manuport Logistics

== See also ==
- ISAF Open Match Racing World Championship
- Women's International Match Racing Series
