= Ian Williams (sailor) =

English yacht racer (born 1977)

- Born: 26 April 1977 (age 49); Exeter, England
- Occupation: Sailor / Lawyer

Ian Williams (born 26 April 1977) is a world class sailor with many credits to his name, including nine-time World Match Racing Champion.

== Biography ==
Ian Williams was born on 26 April 1977 in Exeter, United Kingdom. He sailed with his parents from a very young age (six weeks old). He started sailing competitively in the International Cadet class while still at school. He studied at the University of Bristol, gaining a BSc degree in Chemistry and Law. He later qualified as a solicitor with Ashurst LLP, and continued working there until 2005.

== Sailing Career ==
Williams's first significant competition was the 1988 UK International Cadet national championship.

Williams specialises in match racing, competing in the World Match Racing Tour. In 2008 following winning the tour and therefore the World Championship title he was shortlisted by the International Sailing Federation for the ISAF World Sailor of the Year Awards. This achievement was remarkable as Williams was up against a number of full-time professional America's Cup teams.

His record in the World Match Racing Tour has led to him being described in glowing terms by sailing commentators. One has written:

I like Ian’s style. So good is he at the tricky, whippet-fast, dizzying discipline of match-racing that he is developing the air of being unbeatable... It’s like watching Schumacher in his prime or Ronnie O’Sullivan on the baize, Williams is just relentlessly good and never knows when he’s beat. It’s talent of the highest order and a pleasure to witness as he just goes about his business with a humility that makes him always one of the hottest properties in sailing.

Williams is featured on the International mainstream sports talk broadcast network as a sailing celebrity on Sports Byline on Sail Sport Talk with Karen Lile (co-host Rick Tittle)
