= Abuse =

Improper usage or mistreatment

Abuse is the act of improper usage or treatment of a person or thing, often to unfairly or improperly gain benefit. Abuse can come in many forms, such as: physical or verbal maltreatment, injury, assault, violation, rape, unjust practices, crimes, or other types of aggression. Some sources describe abuse as "socially constructed", which means there may be more or less recognition of the suffering of a victim at different times and societies.

== Types and contexts of abuse ==
=== Abuse of authority ===
Abuse of authority includes harassment, interference, pressure, and inappropriate requests or favors.

=== Abuse of corpse ===
Abuse of a corpse is often a euphemism for necrophilia (sexual attraction to dead bodies) or for necrophilic acts. As corpses are dead and cannot give consent, any manipulation, removal of parts, mutilation, or sexual acts performed on a dead body is considered abuse.

=== Abuse of discretion ===
An abuse of discretion is a failure to take into proper consideration, the facts and laws relating to a particular matter; an arbitrary or unreasonable departure from precedent and settled judicial custom.

=== Abuse of dominance ===
Market dominance by companies is regulated by public and private enforcement of competition law, also known as antitrust or anti-monopoly law. These laws stop companies from doing things that hurt customers or block fair competition. For example, Article 102 of the Treaty on the Functioning of the European Union (TFEU) prohibits companies in a dominant market position from abusing their power, such as through unfair pricing, limiting production, or refusing to deal with others.

=== Abuse of indulgences ===
In the Catholic Church, an indulgence is a way to reduce punishment for sin, often by prayer, pilgrimage or good works. In the Middle Ages, some Church officials demanded money in exchange both for forgiveness of sins and for other rewards such as future salvation.

=== Abuse of information ===
Abuse of information typically involves a breach of confidence or plagiarism, or extending the confidence of information beyond those authorised.

In the financial world, insider trading can also be considered a misuse of internal information that gives an unfair advantage in investment.

=== Abuse of power ===
Abuse of power, in the form of "malfeasance in office" or "official misconduct", is the commission of an unlawful act, done in an official capacity, which affects the performance of official duties. Malfeasance in office is often grounds for a for cause removal of an elected official by statute or recall election.

=== Abuse of process ===
A cause of action in tort arising from one party making a malicious and deliberate misuse or perversion of regularly issued court process (civil or criminal) not justified by the underlying legal action.

=== Abuse of rank ===
Rankism (also called abuse of rank) is treating people of a lower rank in an abusive, discriminatory, or exploitative way. Robert W. Fuller claims that rankism includes the abuse of the power inherent in superior rank, with the view that rank-based abuse underlies many other phenomena such as bullying, racism, sexism, and homophobia.

=== Abusive supervision ===
Abusive supervision is most commonly studied in the context of the workplace, although can arise in other areas such as in the household and at school. "Abusive supervision has been investigated as an antecedent to negative subordinate workplace outcome". "Workplace violence has combination of situational and personal factors". The study that was conducted looked at the link between abusive supervision and different workplace events.

=== Academic abuse ===
Academic abuse is a form of workplace bullying which takes place in institutions of higher education, such as colleges and universities. Academia is highly competitive and has a well defined hierarchy, with junior staff being particularly vulnerable.

=== Adult abuse ===
Adult abuse refers to the abuse of vulnerable adults.

=== Alcohol use disorder ===
Alcohol use disorder, as described in the DSM-IV, is a psychiatric diagnosis describing the recurring use of alcoholic beverages despite its negative consequences. Alcohol use disorder is sometimes referred to by the less specific term alcoholism. There are two types of people with alcohol use disorder: those who have anti-social and pleasure-seeking tendencies, and those who are anxiety-ridden- people who are able to go without drinking for long periods of time but are unable to control themselves once they start. Binge drinking is another form of alcohol use disorder. Frequent binge drinking or getting severely drunk more than twice is classed as alcohol misuse. According to research done through international surveys, the heaviest drinkers happen to be the United Kingdom's adolescent generation.

=== Animal abuse ===
Animal abuse is the infliction of suffering or harm upon animals, other than humans, for purposes other than self-defense. More narrowly, it can be harm for specific gain, such as killing animals for fur. Diverging viewpoints are held by jurisdictions throughout the world.

=== Anti-social behavior ===
Anti-social behavior is often seen as public behavior that lacks judgement and consideration for others and may damage them or their property. It may be intentional, as with vandalism or graffiti, or the result of negligence. Persistent anti-social behavior may be a manifestation of an antisocial personality disorder. The counterpart of anti-social behavior is pro-social behavior, namely any behavior intended to help or benefit another person, group or society.

=== Bullying ===
Bullying is repeated acts over time that involves a real or perceived imbalance of power with the more powerful individual or group attacking those who are less powerful. Bullying may consist of three basic types of abuse – verbal, physical and emotional. It typically involves subtle methods of coercion such as intimidation. Bullying can be defined in many different ways. Although the UK currently has no legal definition of bullying, some US states have laws against it. Bullying is usually done to coerce others by fear or threat.

=== Character assassination ===
Character assassination is an attempt to tarnish a person's reputation. It may involve exaggeration or manipulation of facts to present an untrue picture of the targeted person. It is a form of defamation and can be a form of an ad hominem (to the person) argument.

=== Child abuse ===
Child abuse is the physical or psychological/emotional mistreatment of children. In the United States, the Centers for Disease Control and Prevention (CDC) define child maltreatment as any act or series of acts of commission or omission by a parent or other caregiver that results in harm, potential for harm, or threat of harm to a child. Most child abuse occurs in a child's home, with a smaller amount occurring in the organisations, schools or communities the child interacts with. There are four major categories of child abuse: neglect, physical abuse, psychological/emotional abuse, and sexual abuse.

==== Child sexual abuse ====
Child sexual abuse is a form of child abuse in which an adult or older adolescent abuses a child for sexual stimulation. Different forms of this include: asking or pressuring a child to engage in sexual activities (regardless of the outcome), some types of indecent exposure of genitalia to a child, displaying pornography to a child, actual sexual contact against a child, viewing or engaging in physical contact with the child's genitals for sexual purposes, or using a child to produce child pornography.

===== Child-on-child sexual abuse =====
Child-on-child sexual abuse refers to a form of child sexual abuse in which a prepubescent child is sexually abused by one or more other children or adolescent youths, and in which no adult is directly involved. This includes sexual activity between children that occurs without consent, without equality, or as a result of coercion; particularly when physical force, threats, trickery, or emotional manipulation are used to elicit co-operation.

=== Clandestine abuse ===
Clandestine abuse is sexual, psychological, or physical abuse "that is kept secret for a purpose, concealed, or underhanded."

=== Cyber abuse or cyber bullying ===
Cyberbullying "involves the use of information and communication technologies to support deliberate, repeated, and hostile behavior by an individual or group, that is intended to harm others." - Bill Belsey.

=== Dating abuse or dating violence ===
Dating abuse is a pattern of abusive behaviour exhibited by one or both partners in a dating relationship. The behaviour may include, but is not limited to: physical abuse; psychological abuse; and sexual abuse.

=== Defamation ===
Defamation is the communication of a statement that makes a claim, expressly stated or implied to be factual, that may give an individual, business, product, group, government or nation a negative image. It is usually – but not always, (Note: e.g., in the case the offense of defamatory libel under the common law of England and Wales, where prior to the enactment of section 6 of the Libel Act 1843 (defense of justification for the public benefit), the truth of the defamatory statement was irrelevant, and it continues to be sufficient that it is published to the defamed person alone.) a requirement that this claim be false and that the publication be communicated to someone other than the person defamed (termed the claimant).

=== Disability abuse ===
It has been noted that disabled people are disproportionately affected by disability abuse and bullying, and such activity has been cited as a hate crime. The bullying is not limited to those who are visibly disabled – such as wheelchair-users or individuals with physical differences (e.g., cleft lip) – but also those with learning disabilities, autism or developmental coordination disorder. In the latter case, this is linked to a poor ability in physical education, and this behaviour can be encouraged by an ignorant physical education teacher. Abuse of disabled people is not limited to schools; there are many known cases in which disabled people have been abused by staff of a "care institution", such as the case revealed in a BBC Panorama programme on a Castlebeck care home (Winterbourne View) near Bristol, leading to its closure and suspension or firing of staff members.

=== Discriminatory abuse ===
Discriminatory abuse involves picking on or treating someone unfairly because something about them is different; for example concerning:

- age
- clothing or appearance
- ethnicity, nationality or culture including traits like language
- gender, including gender-related traits (e.g., Pregnancy)
- health (such as HIV/AIDS) or disability (e.g., mental disorders)
- language usage
- lifestyle or occupation
- race or skin colour
- religion or political affiliation
- sexuality and sexual orientation
- social class or creed
- weight or height

Discriminatory laws such as redlining have existed in many countries. In some countries, controversial attempts such as racial quotas have been used to redress negative effects of discrimination.

Other acts of discrimination include political libel, defamation of groups and stereotypes based on exaggerations.

=== Domestic abuse or domestic violence ===
Domestic abuse can be broadly defined as any form of abusive behaviours by one or both partners in an intimate relationship, such as marriage, cohabitation, family, dating, or even friends. Domestic violence has many forms, including:

- physical aggression (hitting, kicking, biting, shoving, restraining, throwing objects), or threats thereof
- sexual abuse
- emotional abuse
- financial abuse (withholding money or controlling all money, including that of other family members)
- social abuse (restricting access to friends or family, insulting or threatening friends or family), controlling or domineering
- intimidation
- stalking
- passive/covert abuse (e.g., neglect)
- economic deprivation

Depending on local statues, the domestic violence may or may not constitute a crime, also depending on the severity and duration of specific acts, and other variables. Alcohol consumption and mental illness have frequently been associated with abuse.

=== Economic abuse ===
Economic abuse is a form of abuse when one intimate partner has control over the other partner's access to economic resources, which diminishes the victim's capacity to support themselves and forces them to depend on the perpetrator financially.

=== Elder abuse ===
Elder abuse is a type of harm to older adults involving abuse by trusted individuals in a manner that "causes harm or distress to an older person". This definition has been adopted by the World Health Organization from a definition put forward by Action on Elder Abuse in the UK. The abuse includes violence, neglect, and other crimes committed against an elderly person and their forms include physical, mental, and financial abuses as well as passive and active neglect.

=== Emotional abuse ===
While there is an absence of consensus as to the precise definition of emotional abuse, it is classified by the U.S. federal Child Abuse Prevention and Treatment Act as a form of mental injury. The typical legal definition, particularly in the area of child welfare, accepted by the majority of U.S. states describes it as injury to the psychological capacity or emotional stability as evidenced by an observable or substantial change in behavior, emotional response or cognition.

=== False accusations ===
False accusations (or false allegations) can be in any of the following contexts:

- informally in everyday life;
- quasi-judicially;
- judicially.

=== Gaming the system ===
Gaming the system (also called bending the rules, gaming the rules, playing the system, abusing the system, milking the system, or working the system) can be defined as using the rules and procedures meant to protect a system to instead manipulate the system for a desired outcome.

=== Gaslighting ===
Gaslighting is manipulation through persistent denial, misdirection, contradiction, and lying in an attempt to destabilize and delegitimize a target. Its intent is to sow seeds of doubt in the targets, hoping to make them question their own memory, perception, and sanity. Instances may range from the denial by an abuser that previous abusive incidents ever occurred up to the staging of bizarre events by the abuser with the intention of disorienting the victim. The term owes its origin to Gaslight, a 1938 play and 1944 film, and has been used in clinical and research literature.

=== Gay abuse or gay bashing ===
Gay bashing and gay bullying are verbal or physical abuse against a person perceived by the aggressor to be gay, lesbian, or bisexual, including people who are actually heterosexual, or of non-specific or unknown sexual orientation.

=== Harassment ===
Harassment covers a wide range of offensive behaviour. It is commonly understood as behaviour intended to disturb or upset. In the legal sense, it is behaviour which is found threatening or disturbing.

Power harassment is harassment or unwelcome attention of a political nature, often occurring in the environment of a workplace.

Sexual harassment refers to persistent and unwanted sexual advances, typically in the workplace, where the consequences of refusing sexual requests are potentially very disadvantageous to the victim.

=== Hate crimes ===
Hate crimes occur when a perpetrator targets a victim because of his or her perceived membership in a certain social group; usually defined by racial group, religion, sexual orientation, disability, ethnicity, nationality, age, gender, gender identity, or political affiliation.

"Hate crime" generally refers to criminal acts which are seen to have been motivated by hatred of one or more of the listed conditions. Incidents may involve physical assault, damage to property, bullying, harassment, verbal abuse or insults, or offensive graffiti or inflammatory letters (hate mail).

=== Hazing ===
Hazing is considered any activity involving harassment, abuse, or humiliation as a way of initiating a person into a group.

Hazing is seen in many different types of groups; including within gangs, clubs, sports teams, military units, and workplaces. In the United States and Canada, hazing is often associated with Greek-letter organisations (fraternities and sororities). Hazing is often prohibited by law and may be either physical (possibly violent) or mental (possibly degrading) practices. It may also include nudity or sexually oriented activities.

=== Human rights abuse ===
Human rights are "basic rights and freedoms to which all humans are entitled." Examples of rights and freedoms which have come to be commonly thought of as human rights include civil and political rights, such as the right to life and liberty, freedom of expression, and equality before the law; and economic, social and cultural rights, including the right to participate in culture, the right to be treated with respect and dignity, the right to food, the right to work, and – in certain countries – the right to education.

=== Humiliation ===
Humiliation is the abasement of pride, which creates mortification or leads to a state of being humbled or reduced to lowliness or submission. It can be brought about through bullying, intimidation, physical or mental mistreatment or trickery, or by embarrassment if a person is revealed to have committed a socially or legally unacceptable act.

=== Incivility ===
Incivility is a general term for social behaviour lacking in civility or good manners, ranging from rudeness or lack of respect towards elders; vandalism and hooliganism; or public drunkenness and threatening behaviour.

=== Institutional abuse ===
Institutional abuse can typically occur in a care home, nursing home, acute hospital or in-patient setting and can be any of the following:

- discriminatory abuse
- financial abuse
- neglect
- physical abuse
- psychological and emotional abuse
- sexual abuse
- verbal abuse

Further reading

- Barter, Christine (1998). Investigating Institutional Abuse of Children (Policy, Practice, Research). National Society for the Prevention of Cruelty to Children (NSPCC). ISBN 978-0902498846
- Beker, Jerome (1982). Institutional Abuse of Children and Youth (Child & Youth Services). Routledge.
- Manthorpe J, Penhale B, Stanley N (1999). Institutional Abuse: Perspectives Across the Life Course. Routledge.
- Westcott, Helen L (1991). Institutional Abuse of Children – From Research to Policy: A Review (Policy, Practice, Research S.) National Society for the Prevention of Cruelty to Children (NSPCC).

=== Insult ===
An insult is an expression, statement or behaviour considered to be degrading and offensive.

=== Intimidation ===
Intimidation involves intentional behavior that would cause a person of reasonable apprehension to fear harm or injury. Within the context of a criminal prosecution it is not necessary to prove that the behavior caused the victim to experience terror or panic. "The calculated use of violence or the threat of violence to attain goals political, religious, or ideological in nature... through intimidation, coercion, or instilling fear" can be defined as terrorism.

=== Legal abuse ===
Legal abuse refers to abuses associated with both civil and criminal legal action.

=== Market abuse ===
Market abuse may arise in circumstances where financial investors have been unreasonably disadvantaged, directly or indirectly, by others who:

- have used information which is not publicly available (insider dealing)
- have distorted the price-setting mechanism of financial instruments
- have disseminated false or misleading information.

=== Military abuse ===
War crimes are "violations of the laws or customs of war", including "murder, the ill-treatment or deportation of civilian residents of an occupied territory to slave labor camps", "the murder or ill-treatment of prisoners of war", the killing of hostages, "the wanton destruction of cities, towns and villages, and any devastation not justified by military, or civilian necessity".

War rape is rape committed by soldiers, other combatants or civilians during armed conflict or war. During war and armed conflict rape is frequently used as means of psychological warfare to humiliate the enemy and undermine their morale.

Military sexual trauma is sexual assault and rape experienced by military personnel. It is often accompanied by posttraumatic stress disorder.

=== Mind abuse or mind control ===
Mind abuse or mind control refers to a process in which a group or individual "systematically uses unethically manipulative methods to persuade others to conform to the wishes of the manipulator(s), often to the detriment of the person being manipulated". The term has been applied to any tactic, psychological or otherwise, which can be seen as subverting an individual's sense of control over their own thinking, behaviour, emotions or decision making.

=== Misconduct ===
Misconduct means a wrongful, improper, or unlawful conduct motivated by premeditated or intentional purpose or by obstinate indifference to the consequences of one's acts. Three categories of misconduct are official misconduct, professional misconduct and sexual misconduct.

=== Mobbing ===
Mobbing means bullying of an individual by a group in any context. Identified as emotional abuse in the workplace (such as "ganging up" on someone by co-workers, subordinates or superiors) to force someone out of the workplace through rumour, innuendo, intimidation, humiliation, discrediting, and isolation, it is also referred to as malicious, nonsexual, nonracial, general harassment.

Mobbing can take place in any group environment such as a workplace, neighbourhood or family.

=== Narcissistic abuse ===
Narcissistic abuse is a term in popular psychology that refers to mentally abusive acts committed by those deemed to be narcissistic.

=== Neglect ===
Neglect is a passive form of abuse in which a caregiver responsible for providing care for a victim (a child, a physically or mentally disabled adult, an animal, a plant, or an inanimate object) fails to provide adequate care for the victim's needs, to the detriment of the victim. It is typically seen as a form of laziness or apathy on the form of the caregiver, rather than ignorance due to inability; accordingly, neglect of a child by and adult with mental disorders or who is overworked is not considered abuse, although this may constitute child neglect nonetheless.

Examples of neglect include failing to provide sufficient supervision, nourishment, medical care or other needs for which the victim is helpless to provide for themselves.

=== Negligence ===
Negligence is conduct that is culpable (to blame) because it falls short of what a reasonable person would do to protect another individual from foreseeable risks of harm.

=== Parental abuse by children ===
Abuse of parents by their children is a common but under-reported and under-researched subject. Parents are quite often subject to levels of childhood aggression, typically in the form of verbal or physical abuse, in excess of normal childhood aggressive outbursts. Parents feel a sense of shame and humiliation to have that problem, so they rarely seek help; nor is much help available today.

=== Passive–aggressive behaviour ===
Passive–aggressive behaviour is a form of covert abuse. It is passive, sometimes obstructionist resistance to following through with expectations in interpersonal or occupational situations. It can manifest itself as learned helplessness, procrastination, stubbornness, resentment, sullenness, or deliberate and repeated failures in accomplishing tasks for which one is (often explicitly) expected to do.

=== Patient abuse ===
Patient abuse or neglect is any action or failure to act which causes unreasonable suffering, misery or harm to the patient. It includes physically striking or sexually assaulting a patient. It also includes withholding of necessary food, physical care, and medical attention. It applies to various contexts such as hospitals, nursing homes, clinics and home visits.

=== Peer abuse ===
"Peer abuse" is an expression popularised by author Elizabeth Bennett in 2006 to reinforce the idea that it is as valid to identify bullying as a form of abuse just as one would identify any other form of abuse. The term conveys similar connotations to the term peer victimisation.

=== Persecution ===
Persecution is the systematic mistreatment of an individual or group by another group. The most common forms are religious persecution, ethnic persecution, and political persecution; though there is naturally some overlap between these terms.

=== Physical abuse ===
Physical abuse is abuse involving contact intended to cause feelings of intimidation, pain, injury, or other physical suffering or bodily harm.

==== Torture ====
Torture is any act by which severe pain, whether physical or psychological, is intentionally inflicted.

=== Police abuse ===
Police brutality is the intentional use of excessive force by a police officer. Though usually physical it has the potential to arise in the form of verbal attacks or psychological intimidation. It is in some instances triggered by "contempt of cop", i.e., perceived disrespect towards police officers.

Police corruption is a specific form of police misconduct designed to obtain financial benefits or career advancement for a police officer or officers in exchange for not pursuing, or selectively pursuing, an investigation or arrest.

Police misconduct refers to inappropriate actions taken by police officers in connection with their official duties. Police misconduct can lead to a miscarriage of justice and sometimes involves discrimination.

=== Prejudice ===
A prejudice is a preconceived belief, opinion, or judgment toward a group of people or a single person because of race, social class, gender, ethnicity, sexual orientation, age, disability, political beliefs, religion, line of work or other personal characteristics. It also means a priori beliefs (without knowledge of the facts) and includes "any unreasonable attitude that is unusually resistant to rational influence." Although positive and negative prejudice both exist, when used negatively, "prejudice" implies fear and antipathy toward such a group or person.

=== Prison abuse or prisoner abuse ===
Prisoner abuse is the mistreatment of persons while they are under arrest or incarcerated. Abuse falling into this category includes:

- Physical abuse: hitting, beating, or other unauthorised corporal punishment.
- Psychological abuse: taunting, sleep deprivation, or other forms of psychological abuse, occasionally white noise
- Sexual abuse: forced intercourse, genital mutilation, or other forms of sexual abuse.
- Other abuse: refusal of essential medication, humiliation, etc.
- Enhanced interrogation: methods implemented in the war on terror purportedly needed to extract information since other techniques would not yield results.
- Torture: any act by which severe pain, whether physical or psychological, is intentionally inflicted

=== Professional abuse ===
Professional abusers:

- take advantage of their client or patient's trust
- exploit their vulnerability
- do not act in their best interests
- fail to keep professional boundaries

Abuse may be:

- discriminatory
- financial
- physical/neglectful
- psychological/emotional
- sexual

Professional abuse always involves:

- betrayal of trust
- exploitation of vulnerability
- violation of professional boundaries

Further reading

- Dorpat, Theodore L (1996). Gaslighting, the Double Whammy, Interrogation and Other Methods of Covert Control in Psychotherapy and Analysis. Jason Aronson, Incorporated.
- Penfold, P. Susan (1998). Sexual Abuse by Health Professionals: A Personal Search for Meaning and Healing. University of Toronto Press.

=== Psychological abuse ===
Psychological abuse, also referred to as emotional abuse or mental abuse, is a form of abuse characterized by a person subjecting or exposing another to behavior that is psychologically harmful. Such abuse is often associated with situations of power imbalance, such as abusive relationships, bullying, child abuse and in the workplace.

=== Racial abuse ===
Racism is abusive attitudes or treatment of others based on the belief that race is a primary determinant of human traits and capacities. It is a form of pride that one's own race is superior and, as a result, has a right to "rule or dominate others", according to a Macquarie Dictionary definition. Racism is correlated with and can foster race-based prejudice, violence, dislike, discrimination, and oppression.

=== Ragging ===
Ragging is a form of abuse on newcomers to educational institutions in India, Sri Lanka, and Australia. It is similar to the American phenomenon known as hazing. Currently, Sri Lanka is said to be its worst affected country in the world.

=== Rape ===
Rape, a form of sexual assault, is an assault by a person involving sexual intercourse (with or without sexual penetration) of another without the other's consent (this includes those who are considered unable to consent, e.g., if they were inebriated or asleep)

The rate of reporting, prosecution and convictions for rape varies considerably in different jurisdictions. The US Bureau of Justice Statistics (1999) estimated that 91% of US rape victims are female and 9% are male, with 99% of the offenders being male. In one survey of women, only two percent of respondents who stated they were sexually assaulted said that the assault was perpetrated by a stranger. For men, male-male rape in prisons has been a significant problem.

=== Relational aggression ===
Relational aggression, also known as covert aggression or covert bullying is a type of aggression in which harm is caused through damage to relationships or social status within a group rather than physical violence. Relational aggression is more common and has been studied more among girls than boys.

=== Religious abuse ===
Religious abuse refers to:

- use of religious teachings in an abusive manner that causes psychological harm
- harassment or humiliation on the basis of the victim's religion, (see religious discrimination)
- misuse of a religion for selfish, secular or ideological ends, see
  - religion and politics
  - abuse of a clerical position to perpetrate non-religiously motivated abuse, such as in the Catholic sex abuse cases
- any form of religious violence, including:
  - human sacrifice
  - violent initiation rites

=== Satanic ritual abuse ===
Satanic ritual abuse (SRA, sometimes known as ritual abuse, ritualistic abuse, organised abuse, sadistic ritual abuse and other variants) was a moral panic that originated in the United States in the 1980s, spreading throughout the country and eventually to many parts of the world, before subsiding in the late 1990s.

=== School bullying ===
School bullying is a type of bullying that occurs in connection with education, either inside or outside of school. Bullying can be physical, verbal, or emotional and is usually repeated over a period of time.

=== Self-abuse ===
Self-destructive behaviour is a broad set of extreme actions and emotions including self-harm and drug abuse. It can take a variety of forms, and may be undertaken for a variety of reasons. It tends to be most visible in young adults and adolescents, but may affect people of any age.

=== Sexual abuse ===
Sexual abuse is the forcing of undesired sexual behaviour by one person upon another, when that force falls short of being considered a sexual assault. The offender is referred to as a sexual abuser or – more pejoratively – molester. The term also covers any behaviour by any adult towards a child to stimulate either the adult or child sexually. When the victim is younger than the age of consent, it is referred to as child sexual abuse.

=== Sexual bullying ===
Sexual bullying is "any bullying behaviour, whether physical or non-physical, that is based on a person's sexuality or gender. It is when sexuality or gender is used as a weapon by boys or girls towards other boys or girls – although it is more commonly directed at girls. It can be carried out to a person's face, behind their back or through the use of technology."

=== Sibling abuse ===
Sibling abuse is the physical, emotional, or sexual abuse of one sibling by another.

It is estimated that as many as 3% of children are dangerously abusive towards a sibling, making sibling abuse more common than either child abuse by parents or spousal abuse.

=== Smear campaign ===
A "smear campaign", "smear tactic" or simply "smear" is a metaphor for activity that can harm an individual or group's reputation by conflation with a stigmatised group. Sometimes smear is used more generally to include any reputation-damaging activity, including such colloquialisms as mud slinging.

=== Spiritual abuse ===
Spiritual abuse occurs when a person in religious authority or a person with a unique spiritual practice misleads and maltreats another person in the name of God(s), religion, or in the mystery of any spiritual concept. Spiritual abuse often refers to an abuser using spiritual or religious rank in taking advantage of the victim's spirituality (mentality and passion on spiritual matters) by putting the victim in a state of unquestioning obedience to an abusive authority.

=== Stalking ===
Stalking is unwanted attention towards others by individuals (and sometimes groups of people). Stalking behaviours are related to harassment and intimidation. The word "stalking" is a term that has different meanings in different contexts in psychology and psychiatry; and some legal jurisdictions use it to refer to a certain type of criminal offence. It may also to refer to criminal offences or civil wrongs that include conduct which some people consider to be stalking, such as those described in law as "harassment" or similar terms.

=== Structural abuse ===
Structural abuse is sexual, emotional or physical abuse that is imposed on an individual or group by a social or cultural system or authority. Structural abuse is indirect, and exploits the victim on an emotional, mental or psychological level.

=== Substance use disorder ===
A substance use disorder is a patterned use of a drug in which the person consumes the substance in amounts or with methods which are harmful to themselves or others, and is a form of substance-related disorder. Widely differing definitions of substance use disorder are used in public health, medical and criminal justice contexts. In some cases criminal or anti-social behavior occurs when the person is under the influence of a drug, and long term personality changes in individuals may occur as well. In addition to possible physical, social, and psychological harm, use of some drugs may also lead to criminal penalties, although these vary widely depending on the local jurisdiction.

=== Surveillance abuse ===
Surveillance abuse is the use of surveillance methods or technology to monitor the activity of an individual or group of individuals in a way which violates the social norms or laws of a society. Mass surveillance by the state may constitute surveillance abuse if not appropriately regulated. Surveillance abuse often falls outside the scope of lawful interception. It is illegal because it violates peoples' right to privacy.

=== Taunting ===
A taunt is a battle cry, a method in hand-to-hand combat, sarcastic remark, or insult intended to demoralise the recipient, or to anger them and encourage reactionary behaviours without thinking. Taunting can exist as a form of social competition to gain control of the target's cultural capital (i.e. status). In sociological theory, the control of the three social capitals (Note: Economic capital, cultural capital, and social capital, according to sociologist Pierre Bourdieu) is used to produce an advantage in the social hierarchy as to enforce one's own position in relation to others. Taunting is committed by either directly bullying, or indirectly encouraging others to bully the target. It is also possible to give a response of the same kind, to ensure one's own status. It can be compared to fighting words and trash-talk.

=== Teasing ===
Teasing is a word with many meanings. In human interactions, teasing comes in two major forms, playful and hurtful. In mild cases, and especially when it is reciprocal, teasing can be viewed as playful and friendly. However, teasing is often unwelcome and then it takes the form of harassment. In extreme cases, teasing may escalate to actual violence, and may even result in abuse. Children are commonly teased on such matters as their appearance, weight, behaviour, abilities, and clothing. This kind of teasing is often hurtful, even when the teaser believes he or she is being playful. One may also tease an animal. Some animals, such as dogs and cats, may recognise this as play; but in humans, teasing can become hurtful and take the form of bullying and abuse.

=== Terrorism ===
Terrorism is the systematic use of terror especially as a means of coercion. At present, there is no internationally agreed definition of terrorism. Common definitions of terrorism refer only to those violent acts which are intended to create fear (terror), are perpetrated for an ideological goal (as opposed to a lone attack), and deliberately target or disregard the safety of non-combatants (e.g., neutral military personnel or civilians). It is sometimes sponsored by state policies when a country is not able to prove itself militarily to another enemy country.

=== Transgender abuse or trans bashing ===
Trans bashing is the act of victimising a person physically, sexually, or verbally because they are transgender or transsexual. Unlike gay bashing, it is committed because of the target's actual or perceived gender identity, not sexual orientation.

=== Umpire abuse ===
Umpire abuse refers to the act of abuse towards an umpire, referee, or other official in sport. The abuse can be verbal abuse (such as namecalling), or physical abuse (such as punching).

=== Verbal abuse or verbal attacks ===
Verbal abuse is a form of abusive behaviour involving the use of language. It is a form of profanity that can occur with or without the use of expletives. While oral communication is the most common form of verbal abuse, it also includes abusive words in written form.

Verbal abuse is a pattern of behaviour that can seriously interfere with one's positive emotional development and can lead to significant detriment to one's self-esteem, emotional well-being, and physical state. It has been further described as an ongoing emotional environment organised by the abuser for the purposes of control.

=== Whispering campaign ===
A whispering campaign is a method of persuasion in which damaging rumours or innuendo are spread about the target, while the source of the rumours seeks to avoid being detected while spreading them (for example, a political campaign might distribute anonymous flyers attacking the other candidate).

=== Workplace abuse or workplace bullying ===
Workplace bullying, like childhood bullying, is the tendency of individuals or groups to use persistent aggressive or unreasonable behaviour against a co-worker. Workplace bullying can include such tactics as verbal, nonverbal, psychological, physical abuse and humiliation. This type of aggression is particularly difficult because unlike the typical forms of school bullying, workplace bullies often operate within the established rules and policies of their organisation and their society. Bullying in the workplace is in the majority of cases reported as having been perpetrated by a manager and takes a wide variety of forms.

== Characteristics and styles of abuse ==
[top]

Some important characteristics and styles of abuse are:

- overt abuse
- covert (or controlling) abuse
- unpredictability
- disproportional (exaggerated) reactions
- dehumanisation and objectification
- abuse of information
- impossible situations (setting up to fail)
- control by proxy
- ambient abuse (gaslighting)

== Abusive power and control ==
Abusive power and control (or controlling behaviour or coercive control) is the way that abusers gain and maintain power and control over a victim for an abusive purpose such as psychological, physical, sexual, or financial abuse. The abuse can be for various reasons such as personal gain, personal gratification, psychological projection, devaluation, envy, or just for the sake of it as the abuser may simply enjoy exercising power and control.

Controlling abusers may use multiple tactics to exert power and control over their victims. The tactics themselves are psychologically and sometimes physically abusive. Control may be helped through economic abuse thus limiting the victim's actions as they may then lack the necessary resources to resist the abuse. The goal of the abuser is to control and intimidate the victim or to influence them to feel that they do not have an equal voice in the relationship.

Manipulators and abusers control their victims with a range of tactics, including positive reinforcement (such as praise, superficial charm, flattery, ingratiation, love bombing, smiling, gifts, attention), negative reinforcement, intermittent or partial reinforcement, psychological punishment (such as nagging, silent treatment, swearing, threats, intimidation, emotional blackmail, guilt trips, inattention) and traumatic tactics (such as verbal abuse or explosive anger).

The vulnerabilities of the victim are exploited with those who are particularly vulnerable being most often selected as targets. Traumatic bonding can occur between the abuser and victim as the result of ongoing cycles of abuse in which the intermittent reinforcement of reward and punishment creates powerful emotional bonds that are resistant to change and a climate of fear. An attempt may be made to normalise, legitimise, rationalise, deny, or minimise the abusive behaviour, or blame the victim for it.

Isolation, gaslighting, mind games, lying, disinformation, propaganda, destabilisation, brainwashing and divide and rule are other strategies that are often used. The victim may be plied with alcohol or drugs or deprived of sleep to help disorientate them.

Certain personality types feel particularly compelled to control other people.

== Psychological characteristics of abusers ==
[top]

In their review of data from the Dunedin Multidisciplinary Health and Development Study (a longitudinal birth cohort study; n = 941) Moffitt et al. report that while men exhibit more aggression overall, gender is not a reliable predictor of interpersonal aggression, including psychological aggression. The study found that whether male or female, aggressive people share a cluster of traits, including high rates of suspicion and jealousy; sudden and drastic mood swings; poor self-control; and higher than average rates of approval of violence and aggression. Moffitt et al. also argue that antisocial men exhibit two distinct types of interpersonal aggression (one against strangers, the other against intimate female partners), while they argue that antisocial women are rarely aggressive against anyone other than intimate male partners.

Male and female perpetrators of emotional and physical abuse exhibit high rates of personality disorders. Rates of personality disorder in the general population are roughly 15%–20%, while roughly 80% of abusive men in court-ordered treatment programmes have personality disorders. Female perpetrators have been found to possess personality disorders revolving around narcissistic and compulsive behaviors. Some reports on child maltreatment state that mothers use physical discipline on children more often than fathers, while severe injury and sexual abuse are more often perpetrated by men.

Abusers may aim to avoid household chores or exercise total control of family finances. Abusers can be very manipulative, often recruiting friends, law officers and court officials, even the victim's family to their side, while shifting blame to the victim.

== Effects of abuse on victims ==
[top]

English et al. report that children whose families are characterised by interpersonal violence, including psychological aggression and verbal aggression, may exhibit a range of serious disorders, including chronic depression, anxiety, post-traumatic stress disorder, dissociation, and anger. Additionally, English et al. report that the impact of emotional abuse "did not differ significantly" from that of physical abuse. Johnson et al. report that, in a survey of female patients (n = 825), 24% suffered emotional abuse, and this group experienced higher rates of gynaecological problems. In their study of men emotionally abused by a wife/partner (n = 116), Hines and Malley-Morrison report that victims exhibit high rates of post-traumatic stress disorder and alcoholism.

Namie's study of workplace bullying found that 31% of women and 21% of men who reported workplace bullying exhibited three key symptoms of post-traumatic stress disorder (hypervigilance, intrusive imagery, and avoidance behaviours). A 1998 study of male college students (n = 70) by Simonelli & Ingram found that men who were emotionally abused by their female partners exhibited higher rates of chronic depression than the general population.

A study of college students (n = 80) by Goldsmith and Freyd report that many who have experienced emotional abuse do not characterise the mistreatment as abusive. Additionally, Goldsmith and Freyd show that these people also tend to exhibit higher than average rates of alexithymia (difficulty identifying and processing their own emotions).

Jacobson et al. found that women report markedly higher rates of fear during marital conflicts. However, a rejoinder argued that Jacobson's results were invalid due to men and women's drastically differing interpretations of questionnaires. Coker et al. found that the effects of mental abuse were similar whether the victim was male or female. Pimlott-Kubiak and Cortina found that severity and duration of abuse were the only accurate predictors of aftereffects of abuse; sex of perpetrator or victim were not reliable predictors.

Analysis of a large survey (n = 25,876) by LaRoche found that women abused by men were slightly more likely to seek psychological help than were men abused by women (63% vs. 62%).

In a 2007 study, Laurent, et al., report that psychological aggression in young couples (n = 47) is associated with decreased satisfaction for both partners: "psychological aggression may serve as an impediment to couples development because it reflects less mature coercive tactics and an inability to balance self/other needs effectively." A 2008 study by Walsh and Shulman reports that psychological aggression by females is more likely to be associated with relationship dissatisfaction for both partners, while withdrawal by men is more likely to be associated with relationship dissatisfaction for both partners.

== See also ==
- Abuse defence
- Abuse prevention program
- Child grooming
- Dissociation
- Re-victimization
- Victimisation
