= Bruno De Wannemaeker =

Belgian sports administrator

Bruno De Wannemaeker (born 19 March 1959 in Nioki, Belgian Congo) is a Belgian sports administrator.

== Life and career ==
In 1981, he graduated as Master in physical education and in 1983 as Master of rehabilitation science and physiotherapy at the Sports Institute of the Katholieke Universiteit Leuven in Belgium. During his university studies, he was active as an alpine skier, handball player and windsurfer. He also played a prominent role in the student sports organisation Apolloon as praeses finances, praeses skistage and praeses kiné.

After mandatory military service in the Belgian army at the Royal Military Academy in Brussels, where he worked as chief physiotherapist, he worked for the Landelijke Windsurfing Federatie, Sun Touroperators Belgium, exportmanager for Biscuits Dupon en Belgian chocolates Van Coillie, Balta Industries and Event Masters.

Since 2002, he has worked for the Flemish Government Bloso as a sports- and event-manager at the Flanders Sports Arena, Topsporthal Vlaanderen in Ghent.

== Sailing, windsurfing and kiteboarding ==
- Since the mid-1980, he has been involved in race management, organisation, juries and measurement on more than 100 International, European, Continental and World Championships in sailing, windsurfing, and kiteboarding. His speciality lies mainly in the windsurfing disciplines such as slalom, formula windsurfing, freestyle, and wave riding. In 2007, he was one of the first to be involved in the kite racing discipline. He was appointed at the 2008 Beijing Olympics as International Race Officer on the 49R and windsurfing course and International Measurer for the RS:X class, 2010 Youth Olympic Games in Singapore (2010) as International Measurer for sailing and windsurfing and the 2012 London Olympics as International Measurer for the RS:X class.

In 2012, he was associated with the ISAF Council's decision in May 2012 to replace the RS:X class with Kiteboard racing. The decision created a grassroots campaign to reinstate the RS:X Class and was overturned by the ISAF General Assembly, which reinstated windsurfing as an Olympic discipline in Dublin on 10 November of the same year. The somewhat unfortunate legacy of the short-lived decision has not entirely dissipated since.

- As a sports administrator he has been involved in the Flemish Yachting Association (VYF), (previously Flemish windsurfing association (LWF) and CWV) mainly on educational, training and top sport issues, the International Sailing Federation (ISAF) (previously IYRU) as a member of the "Windsurfing and Kiteboarding Committee" (previously "Windsurfing Committee") since 1997.
- He received international recognition as ISAF International Race Officer of Sailing in 2002, ISAF International Measurer of Sailing (Funboard, Formula Windsurfing in 2007 and Kiteboard in 2011) and ISAF International Judge of Sailing in 2009.
- He has been a board member of the International Funboard Class Association since 1989 and President since 2001.
- He has been vice-president of the International Windsurfing Association since 2001.
- He has been vice-president of the Vlaamse Yachting Federatie since 2004.
- He has been a board member of the International Kiteboarding Association since 2010 and vice–president since 2011.
- He was a member of the ISAF Windsurfing and Kiteboarding Committee from 2005 and vice-president from 2013 until its dissolution.
- He has been a member of the ISAF Equipment Committee since 2009.
- He has been a member of the ISAF International Measurers Sub-committee since 2013.
