= Clyde Miller =

Clyde Miller may refer to:

- Clyde Miller (Washington politician), member of the Washington House of Representatives
- Clyde L. Miller, Lieutenant Governor of Utah
- Clyde R. Miller, professor of education

== See also ==
- Clyde C. Miller Career Academy, a public high school in St. Louis, Missouri
