= Cuss Control =

Book by James V. O'Connor

Cuss Control: The Complete Book on How to Curb Your Cursing
- Author: James V. O'Connor
- Subject: Self help
- Published: April 11, 2000, Three Rivers Press
- Publication place: United States
- Media type: Print (paperback)
- Pages: 256 pp (first edition, paperback)
- ISBN: 978-0-609-80546-6

Cuss Control: The Complete Book on How to Curb Your Cursing is a self-help book on how to curb swearing written by James V. O'Connor in 2000. O'Connor, who also founded the Cuss Control Academy of Northbrook, Illinois in 1998, has gained a reputation as a swearing expert and the book has been featured and reviewed in hundreds of media outlets, including Time, The Oprah Winfrey Show, The New York Times, The View, and The O'Reilly Factor.

== Author overview ==
O'Connor claims he doesn't remember why he started swearing, but he did so prolifically until he became exasperated with the gratuitous use of the "F-word" in movies and public places. In response he founded the Illinois-based Cuss Control Academy in August 1998. The academy quickly received national attention and O'Connor began making presentations to high schools, civic groups, associations, individuals, and employers on how to control bad language habits. He also offered classes.

In 1999 the campaign landed him on The Oprah Winfrey Show, with Oprah quoting "I swear, and it's the one thing that I really don't like about myself. In a recent survey, 89 percent of the people said swearing is an issue with them. Jim O'Connor runs the Cuss Control Academy, which teaches people how to stop swearing. I agree that swearing is terrible, and I'm going to quit."

== Book overview ==
While in his fifties O'Connor took time off from his public relations firm O'Connor Communications, Inc. to write Cuss Control, which takes a light-hearted but intent look at the history of swearing, why we do it, and how to control it. He does not condemn profanity, but suggests being discreet about when and where we choose to swear. O'Connor chooses to define swearing under two classifications, casual and causal. Casual swearing can be intended humor or lazy language when the speaker doesn't make the effort to use a more meaningful word. Causal swearing is caused by an emotion like pain, anger, or frustration. He also sorts reasons to quit swearing into three clusters; personal, corruption of the language, and societal effects. Personal reasons include trying to maintain a pleasant, respectful, and emotionally in-control image. Swearing can also reflect an abrasive or negative attitude and poor vocabulary. Societal effects include a lack of civility and profanity's ability to instigate violence or unnecessary verbal aggression. O'Connor recommends eliminating casual swearing, working on patience, using alternative words, making points politely, and using volume to make points if necessary. Then friends and co-workers are spared the tension of tirades.

== Printing ==
Three Rivers Press, a division of Random House published the book in April 2000 and demand was initially high. Less than two months on shelves and it was into its third printing. Sales began to taper off in 2006, and O'Connor is now self-publishing the book through www.iuniverse.com.

== Reception ==
O'Connor's book expanded the media attention he was already attracting through the Cuss Control Academy, and he is now recognized by the media as one of the few experts on why swearing is commonplace. By May 2003 O'Connor had already appeared on more than 85 television shows to cover the book. Since then that number has gone over 300, including programs such as Oprah, The Today Show, The Early Show, CNN, ABC World News Tonight, The View, CBS Sunday Morning, The O'Reilly Factor, and CBS Evening News. O'Connor has also been interviewed on over 800 radio stations in every English speaking nation in the world, such as South Africa, England, and Australia. The book has been featured in over 750 magazines and newspapers, including USA TODAY, the Atlanta Constitution The Washington Post, Dallas Morning News, the Los Angeles Times, Knight Ridder News Service, House and Garden, the Los Angeles Times, Time, The National Enquirer, The Christian Science Monitor, The Washington Times, Maxim, the Chicago Tribune, The Columbus Dispatch, the Evansville Courier, the San Bernardino County Sun, Biography, Family Circle, and The Wall Street Journal.

He was also interviewed on the Opie and Anthony show.

He's also interviewed in Fuck - A Documentary along with George Carlin, Drew Carey, Ron Jeremy, Miss Manners, Pat Boone, and other celebrities either for or against the word.

== See also ==
- Profanity
- Name calling
- Insult
- Anger management
