= Umpire =

Official in various competitions

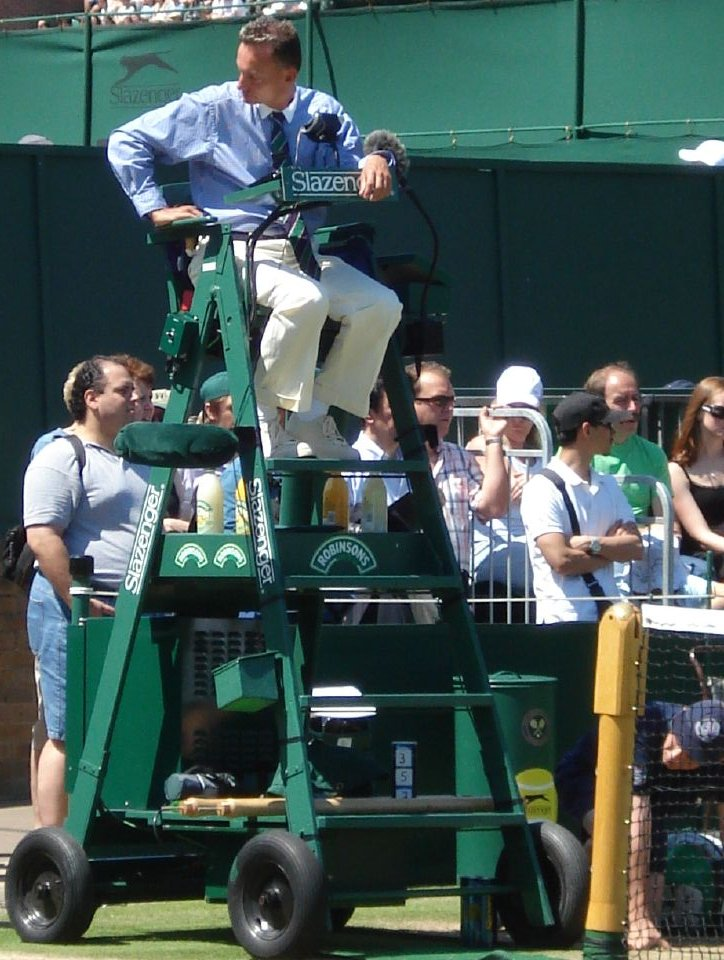
A chair umpire prior to the start of a tennis match

An umpire is an official in a variety of sports and competition who is responsible for enforcing the rules of the sport, including sportsmanship decisions such as ejection.

The word has been applied to the officials of many sports, including baseball, association football (where it has been superseded by assistant-referee), and cricket (which still uses it).

== Etymology ==
The term derives from the Old French nonper, non, 'not' and per, 'equal': 'one who is requested to act as arbiter of a dispute between two people' (as evidenced in cricket, where dismissal decisions can only be made on appeal). Noumper shows up around 1350 before undergoing a linguistic shift known as false splitting. It was written in 1426–1427 as a noounpier; later, the n was lost, becoming assimilated into the indefinite article an. The earliest version without the leading n shows up as owmpere, a variant spelling in Middle English, ca. 1440, supplanted by an Oumper around 1475.

== Field hockey ==
An umpire in field hockey is a person with the authority to make decisions on a hockey field in accordance with the laws of the game. Matches are overseen by two umpires, who each take responsibility for officiating play on one half of the field.

== Cricket ==
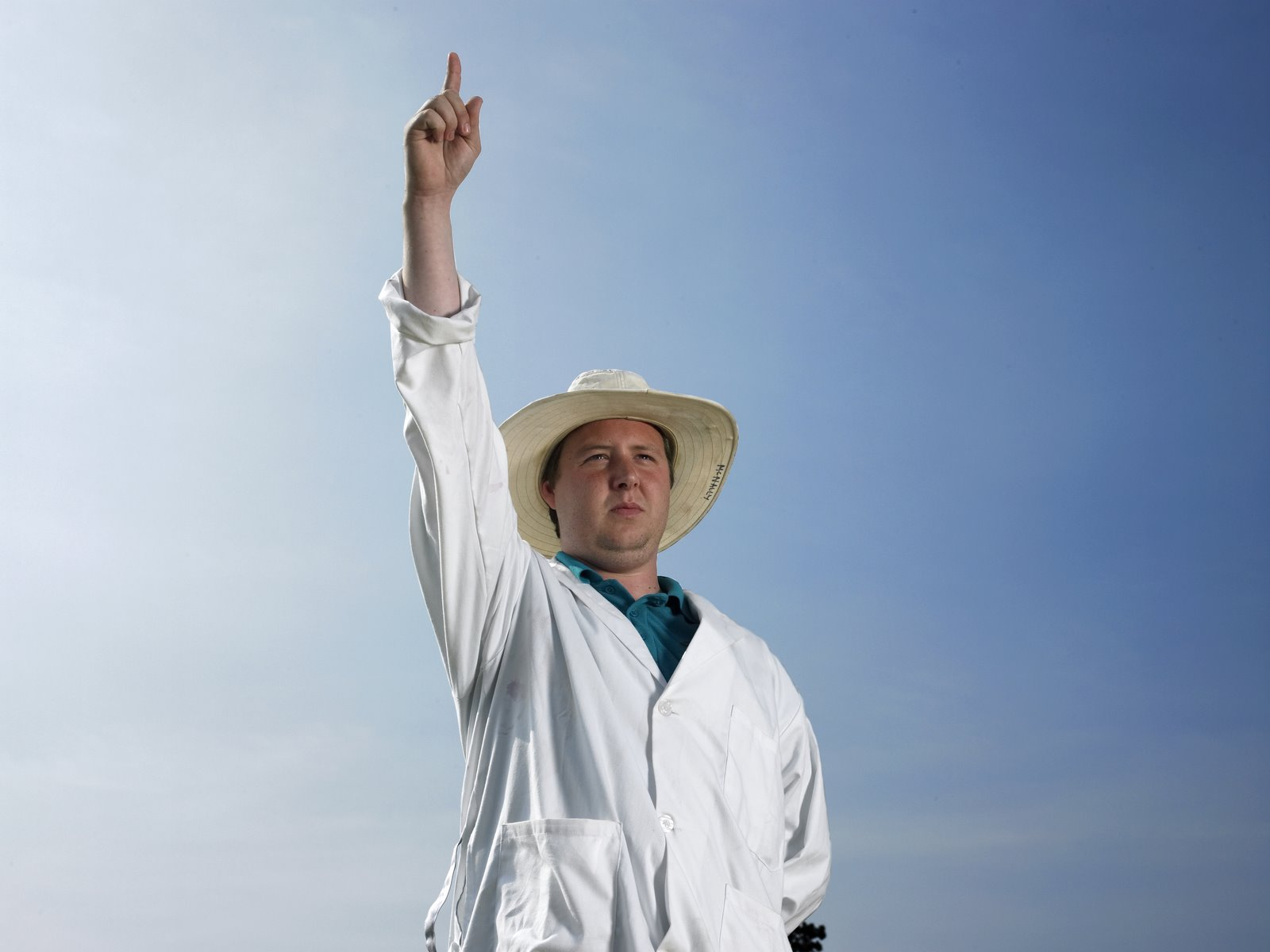
A cricket umpire calling a batsman out

In cricket, dismissal decisions can only be made on appeal by the players. Otherwise, on-field decisions, relevant to the rules and scoring and of the game, are handled by two on-field umpires, although an off-field third umpire may help with certain decisions. At the international level, the match referee is an off-field official who makes judgements concerning the reputable conduct of the game and hands out penalties for breaches of the ICC Cricket Code of Conduct.

== Baseball and softball ==
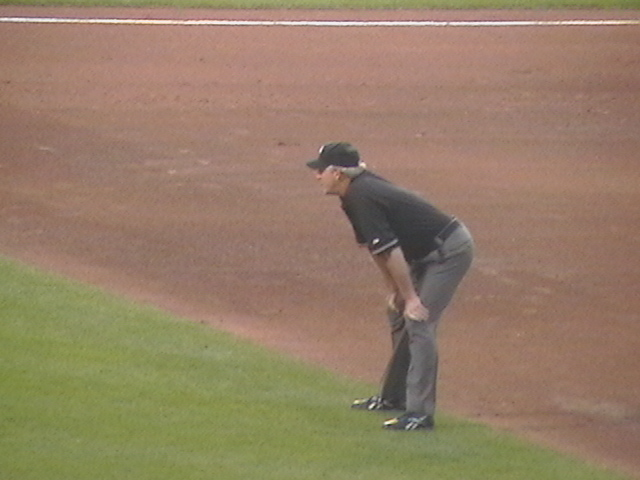
A second base umpire at a baseball game

In baseball and softball, there is commonly a head umpire (also known as a plate umpire) who is in charge of calling balls and strikes from behind the plate, who is assisted by one, two, three, or five field umpires who make calls on their specific bases (or with five umpires the bases and the outfield). On any question, all umpires are equal.

== Football (Australian rules) ==
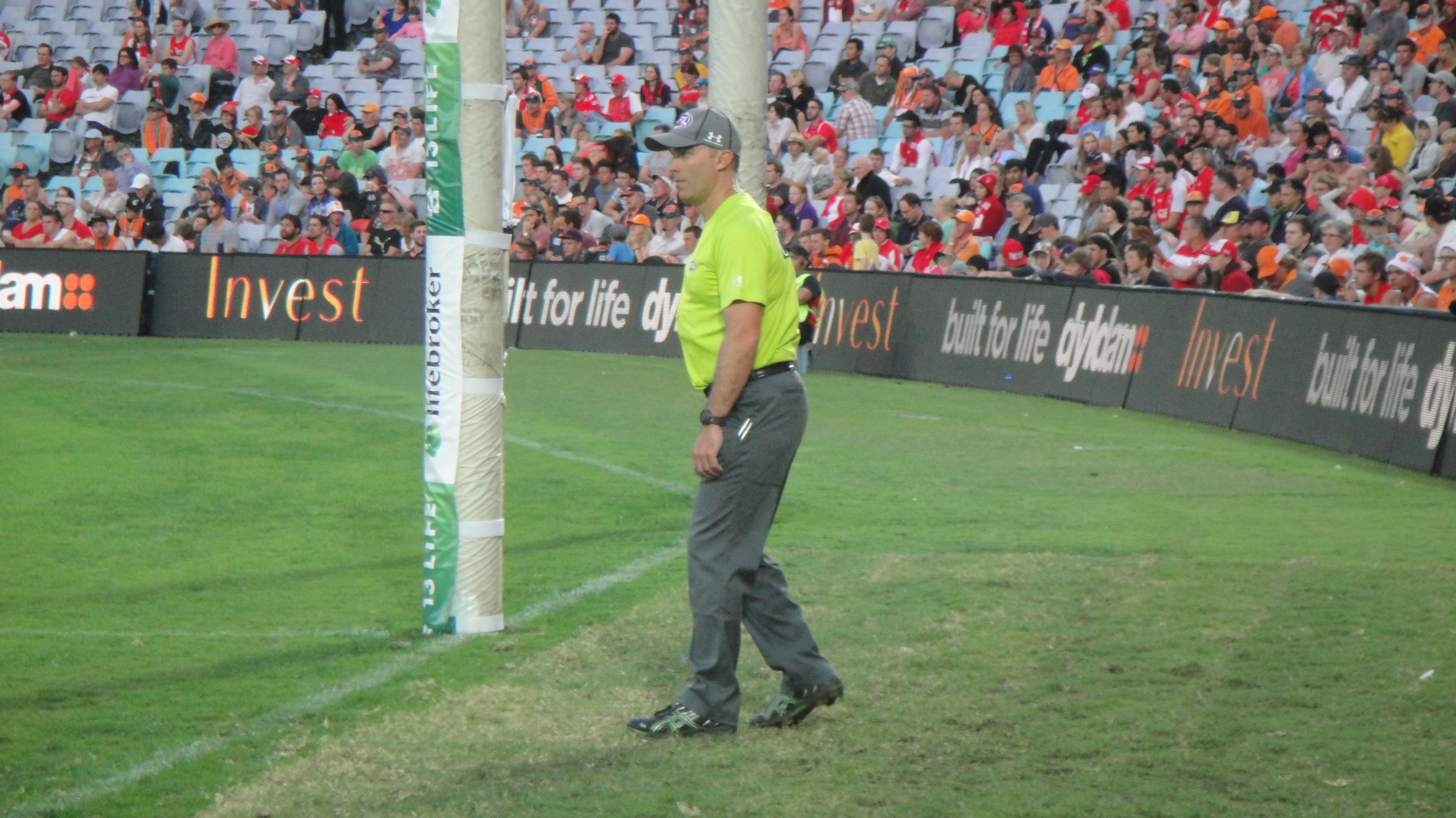
A goal umpire officiating between the goal posts at one end of an Australian rules football field

An umpire is an official in the sport of Australian rules football. Games are overseen by one to four field umpires, two to four boundary umpires, and two goal umpires.

== Lawn bowls ==
A lawn bowls match is presided over by a bowls umpire or technical official. In games where single players compete, a marker is required to direct play and assist players with questions relating to the position of their bowls.

== Netball ==
In the game of netball, the match at hand is presided over by two umpires, typically female, with a comprehensive knowledge of the rules. There are also two timekeepers and two scorekeepers who inform the umpires and players of time remaining and scores.

== Rowing ==
In a regatta an umpire is the on-the-water official appointed to enforce the rules of racing and to ensure safety. In some cases an umpire may be designated specifically as starter, or otherwise the umpire starts the race from a launch and follows it to its end, ensuring that crews follow their proper course. If no infringements occur, the result is decided by a judge or judges on the waterside who determine the finish order of the crews.

== Sailing ==
In match race and team racing, an umpire is an on-the-water referee appointed to directly enforce the Racing Rules of Sailing. An umpire is also used in fleet racing to enforce Racing Rule 42 which limits the use of kinetics to drive the boat rather than the wind. Umpires are rarely present during sailing races as decisions are normally referred to a jury-style protest committee after the race.

== Tennis ==
In tennis an umpire is an on-court official, while a referee is an off-court official.

== Badminton ==
In badminton, the umpire has set authority to call faults and lets. Umpires also keep score and respond to challenges requested by badminton players.

== See also ==
- Umpire abuse
- Referee
