= International judge =

International judge may refer to:

- International Judge of Chess Compositions
- International Judge of Sailing
