= Institute for Propaganda Analysis =

U.S. anti-propaganda organization (1937–1942)

The Institute for Propaganda Analysis (IPA) was a U.S.-based organization operating from 1937 to 1942, composed of social scientists, opinion leaders, historians, educators, and journalists. Created by Kirtley Mather, Edward A. Filene, and Clyde R. Miller, because of the general concern that increased amounts of propaganda were decreasing the public's ability to think critically. The IPA's purpose was to spark rational thinking and provide a guide to help the public have well-informed discussions on current issues. "To teach people how to think rather than what to think." The IPA focused on domestic propaganda issues that might become possible threats to the democratic ways of life.

For the IPA, Nazism, communism, the conservative anti-communist movement, England’s foreign policy, and Latin American dictatorships were all undemocratic. By labeling these group as such, the IPA promoted a democratic society based on freedom of speech and citizen participation in government, and also attempted to accomplish concrete goals such as preventing the rise of Nazism in America.

The IPA's great strength stemmed from its particular fusion of academic and practical progressivism into an organized anti-propaganda critique that institutionalized the tradition of muckraking and also applied this characteristically American critical approach to the discontents of the Depression.

== Genesis ==
Edward A. Filene had amassed a fortune in meeting a mass demand, but he feared that democracy was threatened by propaganda preying upon the unsuspecting citizenry, so he asked Kirtley Mather to help him endow an effort to save democracy. A meeting on "education for democracy" was held March 29, 1937, at the University Club in Boston which attracted Alfred Adler, Lyman Bryson, Edward L. Bernays, and Clyde R. Miller among others. At a second meeting in New York City, Filene provided Miller with a check for $10,000, presumably to finance the Institute in the first year. Filene's Good Will Fund agreed on June 9 to continue the funding for three years.

The institute was incorporated on September 23, 1937. The initial board of directors was Clyde R. Miller, Robert S. Lynd, E. Ernest Johnson, James E. Mendenhall, and Robert K. Speer. Added to the board later were Charles A. Beard, Hadley Cantril, Ernest O. Melby, James T. Shotwell, and Percy S. Brown.The board elected its officers as follows: President: Cantril, V.P.: Melby, Sec.: Miller, Tr.:Speer.

== Work ==
The following propaganda tricks/techniques were among the most well-known contributions of the IPA:

1. Name-calling
2. Glittering generalities
3. Transfer
4. Testimonial
5. Plain folks
6. Card stacking
7. Bandwagon

The institute had seven staff members based at Columbia University's Teachers College. Sociologists studied personality traits to better understand what made someone more susceptible to fascism, including the development of the F-scale. They also brought media literacy training to schools, including a civic engagement curriculum piloted in Springfield, Massachusetts known as The Springfield plan that is still used today. One of the techniques was to label parts of a speech with an icon that represented one of the seven propaganda techniques to help show how it is being used.

== Publications ==
In October 1937 the IPA distributed 3,000 copies of an Announcement edition of the Propaganda Analysis bulletin, soliciting subscriptions. The first two weeks produced 750, and there were 2,500 subscribers in the first year. Father Coughlin’s radio talks were selected by the IPA for analysis since they represented "a fairly typical borrowing of foreign anti-democracy propaganda methods by an American propagandist." Seven tricks of the propagandist were outlined and illustrated by reference to the radio talks in a book The Fine Art of Propaganda, edited by Alfred McClung Lee and Elizabeth Briant Lee. As Clyde Miller explained in the Preface, "So far as individuals are concerned, the art of democracy is the art of thinking and discussing independently together." The book is presented as a "candid and impartial study of the devices and apparent objectives of specialists in the distortion of public opinions."

To get their message across, the IPA distributed flyers, wrote several issues of the Propaganda Analysis Bulletin, and published a series of books, including:

- Violet Edwards (1938) Group Leader's Guide to Propaganda Analysis
- Alfred McClung Lee & Elizabeth Briant Lee (1939) The Fine Art of Propaganda
- James A. Wechsler & Harold Lavine (1940) War Propaganda and the United States, reprinted 1972 by Garland Publishing
- Propaganda Analysis
- Propaganda: How To Recognize and Deal With It

The bulletin Propaganda Analysis indirectly targeted the mass public through newspapers, educators, public officials, and thought leaders. The IPA directly targeted the presidents and deans of national colleges, bishops and ministers, educational and religious periodicals, and education students by sending out flyers.

These "ABCs of Propaganda Analysis" encouraged readers to understand and analyze their own views on propagandistic material in order to promote informed, thought-provoking discussions:

- Ascertain the conflict element in the propaganda.
- Behold your own reaction element.
- Concern yourself with today's propaganda associated with today's conflicts.
- Doubt that your opinions are "your very own".
- Evaluate, therefore, with the greatest care your own propaganda.
- Find the facts before you come to any conclusion.

== Dissolution ==
The IPA faced many allegations that undermined its purpose. These suggested that the IPA created "more of a destructive skepticism than an intelligent reflectiveness." The IPA lost support from many of its publishers and also faced internal conflicts through resignations by its board members and its troubled teachers. The approach of World War II also posed a problem. It would force the IPA not only to examine and criticize the enemy's propaganda, but assess America's use of propaganda as well. The IPA maintains the reason it suspended its operations in 1942 was due to lack of sufficient funds and not the war.

After war was declared on Nazi Germany the neutral stance of propaganda analysis was untenable and the IPA folded in January 1942 with the final issue of its bulletin:

The publication of dispassionate analyses of all kinds of propaganda, 'good' and 'bad', is easily misunderstood during a war emergency, and more important, the analyses could be misused for undesirable purposes by persons opposing the government’s effort. On the other hand, for the Institute, as an Institute, to propagandize or even appear to do so would cast doubt on its integrity as a scientific body.

== Assessment ==
While the IPA existed many people sought assistance from the organization through the many publications that were available. The process includes teaching the audience to avoid emotion while being deceived by tainted propaganda. In order to get the facts, the institute's authors wanted the public to "adopt scientific attitudes towards all questions of fact and to accept the conclusions to which they lead as a basis for action whether he [the student of propaganda] likes them or not." The IPA encouraged students to think intelligently and independently on topics which they discussed. While many hailed the IPA for its guidance, others argued that the approach was "too simplistic because many messages fell into more than one category, and they do not account for differences between members of the audience, and do not discuss the credibility of the propagandist." Despite controversy, the IPA was a resource available to American citizens in hopes of enlightening and activating minds to think freely and independently.

In 1940 Edgar Dale and Norma Vernon wrote an Introduction to an annotated bibliography noting the IPA contribution:

Widespread teaching of propaganda analysis in the schools is due in large measure to the founding of the Institute for Propaganda Analysis in the summer of 1937. ¶ The articles annotated in this bulletin testify to the effect of the bulletins and worksheets of the Institute on the work of teachers throughout the country. Indeed, this very focusing on usable materials for the schools is one secret of the success of the institute.

== Reception ==
In 2018, Dr. Anya Schiffrin argued that many of the ideas from the IPA are still in use today and are foundational for understanding propaganda.

In 2024, Renée DiResta wrote that she found the initiative both effective and prescient.

== See also ==
- Trope (politics)
