= James Wechsler =

American journalist (1915–1983)

- Born: James Arthur Wechsler; October 31, 1915; New York City, US
- Died: September 11, 1983 (aged 67); New York City, US
- Education: Columbia University
- Occupations: Newspaper columnist and editor
- Employer: New York Post
- Awards: James Wechsler Award

James Arthur Wechsler (October 31, 1915 – September 11, 1983) was an American journalist who worked as a newspaper columnist, Washington bureau chief, editor-in-chief, and editorial page editor of the New York Post. He was a prominent voice of American liberalism for 40 years and was considered one of the most highly informed and responsible political writers in Washington.

== Early life ==
Born on October 31, 1915, he entered Columbia University when he was just shy of 16. Wechsler graduated in 1935 after rising to editor-in-chief of the Columbia Daily Spectator. In his first year, he attended a speech by Columbia President Nicholas Murray Butler, who said that democracies are incapable of choosing strong leaders like totalitarian nations could, which shocked him. He was shocked again when his friend Reed Harris was fired as editor of the Spectator for criticizing the professionalization of college football.

== Career ==
Between 1934 and 1937, Wechsler belonged to the Young Communist League and was a leader of the pro-Communist American Student Union. He left the League after "an eye-opening trip to the Soviet Union." He publicly condemned the 1939 Hitler-Stalin pact and was repeatedly attacked by official Communist organs.

From 1942 to 1946, except for one year in the US Army, Wechsler was national editor of the newspaper PM.

In May 1949, at 33, Wechsler became the editor of the New York Post and, in an unusual arrangement, he was in charge of both the news operation and the editorial page. The Post then became known as a crusading liberal newspaper, undertaking investigate exposés of figures like J. Edgar Hoover, Walter Winchell, and Robert Moses. In September 1952, the paper published a story about a fund financed by wealthy California businessmen to supplement Senator Richard Nixon's office expenses that led Nixon to respond in his famous televised Checkers speech during his successful quest for the vice-presidency.

In 1961, Wechsler was shifted to the position of editorial page editor after being replaced as editor of the news section by Paul Sann; he held that position until 1980. Besides editorials, Wechsler also wrote a regular column, which continued until shortly before his death.

== Opposed by McCarthy and Nixon ==
Senator Joseph McCarthy questioned his conversion to anticommunism. Wechsler testified before McCarthy's committee in 1953 on his past adherence to communism and named other party members.

Journalist Michael C. Moynihan wrote:

When Wechsler testified before McCarthy’s Senate committee, the senator’s deep paranoia was on prominent display. He suggested that Wechsler’s well-documented hostility to Stalin was an elaborate ruse. As his quarry shifted in his chair, McCarthy speculated that Post editorials critical of his committee were planted by the Manchurian editor: 'Perhaps the most effective way of [propagandizing for communism] would be to claim that we deserted the party and, if we got in control of the paper, use that paper to attack and smear anybody who actually was fighting Communism.'

Wechsler's work earned him a place on the master list of Nixon political opponents.

== Death and legacy ==
Wechsler died of lung cancer on September 11, 1983, in New York City.

In his honor, Columbia University launched the James Wechsler Award. The Wisconsin Historical Society holds a collection of Wechsler's papers.

== Works ==
- 1936: Revolt on the Campus
- 1940: (with Harold Lavine) War Propaganda and the United States, Institute for Propaganda Analysis, reprinted 1972 by Garland Publishing
- 1943: Labor Baron, a biography of labor leader John L. Lewis
- 1953: The Age of Suspicion, an autobiography explaining his rebellion against the American university system and why he chose Communism, then why he renounced it, warning of the dangers of McCarthyism
- 1960: Reflections of an Angry Middle-Aged Editor
- 1972: In a Darkness, a memoir of his son's mental illness and suicide

== External sources ==
- Meet the Press (May 17, 1953): Martha Rountree with James Wechsler, Marquis Childs, Frank Waldrop, Bert Andrews, and Lawrence Spivak.
