= Harold Lavine =

American editor, journalist, columnist

Harold Lavine (1915-1984) was an American journalist and editor, best known as senior editor at Newsweek magazine, as well as his book co-authored with James Wechsler called War Propaganda and the United States (1940).

== Background ==
Harold Lavine was born on February 19, 1915, in New York City, the son of Elias Lavine and Pauline Bershadsky. He went to high school at Townsend Harris Hall.

== Career ==
In 1932, Lavine became a reporter for the New York American, then the New York Evening Journal (1933), and the New York Evening Post (1934). In 1941, he came assistant managing editor for PM newspaper.

During World War II, he served for the US Army News Service. In 1940, he wrote the book War Propaganda and the United States for the Institute for Propaganda Analysis.

In 1946, Lavine became a senior editor at Newsweek magazine. In the 1950s, he contributed to Commentary magazine.

In 1963, Lavine became a senior editor at Forbes magazine. In 1974, he became senior editorial writer and columnist at The Arizona Republic.

== Personal life and death ==
In 1936, Lavine married Violet Edwards; they had one daughter.

Harold Lavine died aged 69 on November 15, 1984.

== Works ==
Books

- War Propaganda and the United States with James A. Wechsler (1940)
- The Fifth Column in America (1940)
- Communists and National Unity: An Interview of PM with Earl Browder (1944)
- Central America (1964)
- Smoke-Filled Rooms (1970)

Articles in Commentary (magazine)

- "Can Eisenhower Form a Government? He’s Learning, and He Keeps His Popular Support"(July 1953)
- "Why the Democrats Are Confident: The GOP, They Think, is Riding for a Fall" (January 1954)
- "Twenty-One G.I.’s Who Chose Tyranny: Why They Left Us for Communism" (July 1954)
- "The Life and Times of General Two-Gun Cohen, by Charles Drage" (October 1954)
- "What Arms Policy to Prevent World War III? Facing Up to the Problem of Atomic Defense" (November 1954)
- "Mr. Eisenhower’s Far East Policy: The Prescription, as Before" (May 1955)
- "The Decline of the Republican Party: Eisenhower Has Failed to Rebuild the Machine" (August 1958)
- "Social Revolution in Cuba: The Future of the New Regime" (October 1959)
