= The Springfield Plan =

The Springfield Plan was a widely publicized intergroup, or intercultural, education policy initiative of the 1940s which was implemented in the public school system of Springfield, Massachusetts. The Plan was the brainchild of Teachers College, Columbia University Associate Professor Clyde R. Miller and the Institute for Propaganda Analysis (IPA). The initiative was the subject of several books, numerous scholarly articles in academic journals, and a Warner Bros. short film starring Andrea King.

Following the publicity it received, the plan became the national model for citizenship and multicultural education during World War II, and school administrators throughout the U.S. traveled to Springfield to witness the plan in action.

The widely stated purpose of the plan was to foster democracy and eliminate racism from schooling. It involved innovative advances in curriculum, including the use of cooperative learning and democratic living classroom activities. Students also participated in projects where they learned about the history and culture of other groups in their broader community. Beyond the school, the plan expanded education into local factories where adult workers were provided with citizenship classes. Lastly, it included new methods for teaching students how to recognize racist propaganda, while it was also innovative in producing positive propaganda, publicizing the advantages of intergroup education for the entire nation.

In 1971 a doctoral student at Teachers College, Columbia University viewed The Springfield Plan in retrospect.
