= Li Quanhai =

Chinese sailing executive

Li Quanhai (born 21 March 1962; Chinese: 李全海; pinyin: Lǐ Quánhǎi) is a Chinese sports administrator, the current President of World Sailing, the international sailing sports body, since 2020, re-elected in 2024 with his term to last till 2028.

== Biography ==
Li participated in the organisation and management of various regional and international sailing events since 1990. He was involved in the 1990 Asian Games, 2008 Summer Olympics, and 2014 Summer Youth Olympics.

Li was appointed secretary-general in 1997, and subsequent vice-president in 2005 with the Chinese Yachting Association. He was appointed as Director-General of the China Water Sports Association in 2013.

At Asian Sailing Federation, Li was the vice president from 2006 to 2008, and president from 2008 to 2010. He was an international judge from 1998 to 2012 before taking on the role of vice-president of World Sailing.

Li was elected president of World Sailing in November 2020, after serving eight years as vice president, defeating Kim Andersen. He was re-elected for a further four-year term in November 2024, ahead of Rodion Luka and Philippe Rogge.
