= Multicultural education =

Set of educational strategies

Multicultural education is a set of educational strategies developed to provide students with knowledge about the histories, cultures, and contributions of diverse groups. It draws on insights from multiple fields, including ethnic studies and women studies, and reinterprets content from related academic disciplines. It is a way of teaching that promotes the principles of inclusion, diversity, democracy, skill acquisition, inquiry, critical thought, multiple perspectives, and self-reflection. One study found these strategies to be effective in promoting educational achievements among immigrant students.

== Objectives ==
The objectives of multicultural education vary among educational philosophers and political theorists. Educational philosophers argue for preservation of minority cultures by fostering students's development of autonomy and introducing them to multiple cultures. This exposure assists students in thinking more critically, as well as, encourages them to have a more open mindset. Political theorists want to use multicultural education to motivate social action. In this approach students are equipped with knowledge, values, and skills necessary to advocate and participate in social change. Teachers then serve as change agents, promoting relevant democratic values and empowering students to act. Other goals include:

- Promote civic good
- Correct historical records
- Increase student self-esteem
- Diversify student exposure
- Preserve minority group culture
- Foster student autonomy
- Promote social justice
- Enable students to succeed economically

Adaptation and modification to established curriculum serve as an example of an approach to preserving minority group culture. Brief sensitivity training, separate units on ethnic celebrations, and closer attention paid to instances of prejudice, are examples of minimal approaches, which are less likely to reap long term benefits for students. Multicultural education should span beyond autonomy, by exposing students to global uniqueness, fostering deepened understanding, and providing access to varied practices, ideas, and ways of life; it is a process of societal transformation and reconstruction. "Creating inclusive campus environments is challenging, but there is also great personal reward to be gained from helping create a campus 'laboratory for learning how to live and interrelate within a complex world' and to prepare students to make significant contributions to that world."

== Views ==
=== Multicultural education and politics ===
Advocates of democracy in schooling, led by John Dewey (1859–1952), argued that public education was needed to educate all students. Dewey believed in pragmatism, meaning that students learn better by a hands on approach. Dewey was convinced that reality is only what is experienced, so students must interact with their environment, including students of various races, ethnicities, and socioeconomic backgrounds. Universal suffrage, along with universal education would make society more democratic. An educated electorate would understand politics and the economy and make wise decisions. By the 1960s, public education advocates argued that educating working people to a higher level (using tools such as the G.I. Bill) would complete the transition to a deliberative democracy. This position is well developed by political philosopher Benjamin R. Barber in Strong Democracy: Participatory Politics for a New Age, published in 1984 and republished in 2003. According to Barber, multicultural education in public schools would promote acceptance of diversity. Meira Levinson argued that "multicultural education is saddled with so many different conceptions that it is inevitably self-contradictory both in theory and in practice, it cannot simultaneously achieve all of the goals it is called upon to serve" According to Banks, "a major goal of multicultural education is to change teaching and learning approaches so that students of both genders and from diverse cultural, ethnic, and language groups will have equal opportunities to learn in educational institutions." Levinson described the rationale for multicultural education as: from learning about other cultures comes tolerance, tolerance promotes respect, respect leads to open mindedness which results in civic reasonableness and equality.

=== Cultural Awareness Through Food ===
Academics across disciplines are interested in how food can be incorporated into education to promote cultural awareness. Dr. Charles Levkoe, an academic researching food systems, has claimed that food can be a means of promoting education about different cultures. Levkoe states that "Through food we can better understand our histories, our cultures, and our shared future." Business Professor Daniel Sterkenberg has spoken about using food to promote cultural awareness among business students. Researchers in the fields of anthropology and communications have also been working on this. Ethnic restaurants can become sites for becoming educated on other cultures.

=== James Banks ===
James Banks, former president of the National Council for the Social Studies and the American Educational Research Association, describes the balancing forces, stating, "Citizenship education must be transformed in the 21st Century because of the deepening racial, ethnic, cultural, language and religious diversity in nation-states around the world. Citizens in a diverse democratic society should be able to maintain attachments to their cultural communities as well as participate effectively in the shared national culture. Unity without diversity results in cultural repression and hegemony. Diversity without unity leads to Balkanization and the fracturing of the nation-state. Diversity and unity should coexist in a delicate balance in democratic multicultural nation-states." Campbell and Baird wrote, "Planning curriculum for schools in a multicultural democracy involves making some value choices. Schools are not neutral. The schools were established and funded to promote democracy and citizenship. A pro-democracy position is not neutral; teachers should help schools promote diversity. The myth of school neutrality comes from a poor understanding of the philosophy of positivism. Rather than neutrality, schools should plan and teach cooperation, mutual respect, the dignity of individuals and related democratic values. Schools, particularly integrated schools, provide a rich site where students can meet one another, learn to work together, and be deliberative about decision making. In addition to democratic values, deliberative strategies and teaching decision-making provide core procedures for multicultural education."

=== Meira Levinson ===
According to Levinson, three groups present different conceptions of "multicultural education." These groups are: political and educational philosophers, educational theorists, and educational practitioners. She claims that they offer different, and sometimes conflicting, aims for schools. Philosophers see multicultural education as a method of response to minorities within a society who advocate for their own group's rights or who advocate for special considerations for members of that group, as a means for developing a child's sense of autonomy, and as a function of the civic good. Educational theorists seek to restructure schools and curriculum to enact "social justice and real equality". By restructuring schools in this way, educational theorists hope that society will thus be restructured as students who received a multicultural education become contributing members of the political landscape. The third and final group, educational practitioners, holds the view that multicultural education increases the self-esteem of students from minority cultures and prepares them to become successful in the global marketplace. Though there are overlaps in these aims, Levinson notes that one goal, cited by of all three prominent groups within the field of education, is that of "righting the historical record".

=== Joe Kincheloe and Shirley Steinberg ===
Kincheloe and Steinberg described confusion in the use of the terms "multiculturalism" and "multicultural education". They offered a taxonomy of the ways the terms were used. The authors warn their readers that they overtly advocate a critical multicultural position and that readers should take this into account as they consider their taxonomy. Kincheloe and Steinberg break down multiculturalism into five categories: conservative multiculturalism, liberal multiculturalism, pluralist multiculturalism, left-essentialist multiculturalism, and critical multiculturalism. These categories are named based on beliefs held by the two largest schools of political thought (liberalism and conservatism) within American society, and they reflect the tenets of each strand of political thought. In Levinson's terms, conservative multiculturalism, liberal multiculturalism, and pluralist multiculturalism view multicultural education as an additive to existing curriculum, while left-essentialist multiculturalism and critical multiculturalism see to restructure education, and thus, society.

=== Aiden Kinkadel ===
Aiden Kinkade's Democratic Equality ideology, as presented by Labaree attempts to allow students to feel like they belong in the classroom, teaches students equal treatment, and gives support to multiculturalism, non-academic curriculum options, and cooperative learning. It supports multicultural education because "in the democratic political arena, we are all considered equal (according to the rule of one person, one vote), but this political equality can be undermined if the social inequality of citizens grows too great". By engaging students with different cultures, abilities, and ethnicities students become more familiar with people that are different from them, hoping to allow a greater acceptance in society. By presenting a variety of cultures, students will feel like they have a voice or a place at school.

== History (United States) ==
Multicultural affairs offices and centers were established to reconcile the inconsistencies in students' experiences by creating a space on campus where students who were marginalized because of their culture could feel affirmed and connected to the institution. Multicultural education considers an equal opportunity for learning beyond the simple trappings of race and gender. It includes students from varying social classes, ethnic groups, sexual identities, and additional cultural characteristics.

Even after the adopting the Thirteenth Amendment in 1865, which officially abolished slavery, racial tension continued within the United States. To help support the ideals contained within the Amendment, Congress adopted the Fourteenth Amendment, which provided all citizens the privileges and immunities clause, as well as the equal protection clause.

In 1896 the United States Supreme Court case, Plessy v. Ferguson. The decision upheld the constitutionality of racial segregation in all public establishments under the policy of "separate but equal". The decision was never explicitly overturned, but was effectively nullified by a series of Supreme Court decisions and federal laws.

The Springfield Plan was implemented during the 1940s in Springfield, Massachusetts. It was an intergroup, or intercultural, education policy initiative that gathered interest from across the country.

The unanimous 1954 Supreme Court decision in Brown v. Board of Education ended the doctrine of separate but equal for schools. This victory set the stage for multicultural education and mandated school integration. This integration was fiercely resisted in many jurisdictions across the American south. In many places, the prior de jure segregation was replaced by de facto residential segregation as the desire to avoid integrated schools drove many families to migrate to neighborhoods populated exclusively by whites.

The Civil Rights Act of 1964, known as "the most sweeping civil rights legislation since Reconstruction" was enacted. It outlawed discrimination in public spaces and establishments, outlawed any workplace/employment discrimination, and it made integration possible for schools and other public spaces possible.

In 1968, the Bilingual Education Act was enacted, prompted by limited English-speaking minorities, especially Spanish-speaking citizens who insisted on maintaining their personal connectedness to their heritage and cultural ideals. It was in their hopes that "their lives and histories be included in the curriculum of schools, colleges, and universities…multicultural educators sought to transform the Euro-centric perspective and incorporate multiple perspectives into the curriculum". After 36 years, the Bilingual Education Act was dissolved and in 2002 the needs of English Language Learners were picked up by the No Child Left Behind Act.

The Civil Rights Movement of the 1960s worked to eliminate discrimination in public accommodations, housing, employment, and education. The movement pushed for minority teachers and administrators, community control and revision of textbooks to reflect the country's diversity. Multicultural education became a standard in university studies for new teachers. One of the main focuses of this study was to have students identify their own culture as important, as well as to recognize the differences from other cultures.

The success of the Civil Rights Movement sparked an interest in women's rights, along with the Education for All Handicapped Students Act of 1975. "Practicing educators use the term multicultural education to describe a wide variety of programs and practices related to educational equity, women, ethnic groups, language minorities, low-income groups, LGBT (lesbian, gay, bisexual, and transgender) people, and people with disabilities".

During the 1980s, educators developed a new approach to multicultural education, examining schools as social systems and promoting the idea of educational equality. In Plyler v. Doe (1982) the Supreme Court upheld the educational rights of immigrant students. In the 1990s, educators expanded multicultural education to consider "larger societal and global dimensions of power, privilege, and economics." Educators began to see the classroom as a place to celebrate diversity rather than one tasked with assimilating students to the dominant culture.

Education observe an increasingly multicultural nation that needs critical thinkers able to handle cross-cultural differences. In 2001, No Child Left Behind aimed primarily at helping disadvantaged students. It required "all public schools receiving federal funding to administer a state-wide standardized test annually to all students." With the Race to the Top grant program, "Many advocates of multicultural education quickly found attention to diversity and equity being replaced by attention to standards and student test scores".

Multicultural education focuses on an "intercultural model that advances a climate of inclusion where individual and group differences are valued." Critics such as Sleeter and McLaren want increased emphasis on a critique of racism in education rather than allowing the superficial exposure of cultures to be the standard. They find that many minority groups want to focus on establishing their own cultural identity before attempting to enter into a multicultural world.

=== Library Awards ===
Librarians have had long- standing commitment to multicultural literature. The Ethnic & Multicultural Information Exchange Round Table (EMIERT) of the American Library Association serves as a source of information for recommended ethnic and multilingual collections, services, and programs including immigrants. Librarians study diverse literature in preparation for library practice. Major awards from librarians and library associations include:

- American Indian Youth Literature Awards - American Indian Library Association
- Coretta Scott King Award
- Pura Belpré Award - Association for Library Service to Children
- Sydney Taylor Book Award - Association of Jewish Libraries

== Implementation ==
Practicing educators face many challenges to incorporating multicultural education in their classrooms. Important considerations include:

1. Content Integration: Content integration deals with the extent to which teachers use examples and content from a variety of cultures in their teaching.
2. Knowledge construction: Teachers need to help students understand, investigate, and determine how the implicit cultural assumptions, frames of reference, perspectives, and biases within a discipline influence the ways in which knowledge is constructed.
3. Prejudice Reduction: This dimension focuses on the characteristics of students' racial attitudes and how they can be modified by teaching methods and materials.
4. Empowering School Culture: Grouping and labeling practices, sports participation, disproportionality in achievement, and the interaction of the staff and the students across ethnic and racial lines must be examined to create a school culture that empowers students from diverse racial, ethnic, and gender groups.
5. Equity Pedagogy: An equity pedagogy exists when teachers modify their teaching in ways that will facilitate the academic achievement of students from diverse racial, cultural, gender, and social-class groups.

Multicultural education can be implemented on the macro-level with the implementation of programs and culture at the school-wide or district-wide level and also at the mico-level by specific teachers within their individual classrooms.

=== School and district-wide practices ===
While individual teachers may work to teach in ways that support multicultural ideas, in order to truly experience a multicultural education, there must be a commitment at the school or district level. In developing a school or district wide plan for multicultural education, Dr. Steven L. Paine, West Virginia State Superintendent of schools gives these suggestions:

- Involve stakeholders in the decision-making process.
- Examine the school climate and culture and the roles played by both students and staff.
- Gather information on what is currently being done to promote multicultural education already.
- Establish school-wide activities throughout the year that support multicultural themes.
- Focus on student and teacher outcomes that involve a knowledge of diversity, respect, cooperation, and communication. Involve the community in this plan.

=== Teaching strategies and practices ===
Fullinwider describes one controversial method: teaching to "culturally distinct" learning styles. While studies have shown that "the longer these students of color remain in school, the more their achievement lags behind that of White mainstream students", it is still highly debated whether or not learning styles, are indeed culturally distinctive, and furthermore, whether implementing different teaching strategies with different racial or ethnic groups would help or further alienate minority groups.

All students have different learning styles so incorporating multicultural education techniques into the classroom, may allow all students to be more successful. "Multicultural education needs to enable students to succeed economically in a multicultural world by teaching them to be comfortable in a diverse workforce and skillful at integrating into a global economy". Teacher's should align the curriculum with the groups being taught, rather than about them. Every child can learn so it is the teacher's responsibility to not "track" them, but rather to personalize the curriculum to reach every student. "Teachers need to assume that students are capable of learning complex material and performing at a high level of skill. Each student has a personal, unique learning style that teachers discover and build on when teaching".

Another important consideration in implementing multicultural education into the classroom is how deep to infuse multicultural ideas and perspectives into the curriculum. There are four different approaches or levels to curricular infusion. They are:

1. The Contributions Approach – Dubbed the "Heroes and Holidays" approach; it is the easiest to implement and makes the least impact on the current curriculum. It does however have significant limitations in meeting the goals of multicultural education because "it does not give students the opportunity to see the critical role of ethnic groups in US society. Rather, the individuals and celebrations are seen as an addition or appendage that is virtually unimportant to the core subject areas".
- Ethnic Additive Approach – This is slightly more involved than the contributions approach, but does not require major curriculum restructuring. While this approach is often a first step towards a more multicultural curriculum, it still presents the topic from the dominant perspective. "Individuals or groups of people from marginalized groups in society are included in the curriculum, yet racial and cultural inequalities or oppression are not necessarily addressed".
- Transformative Approach – This approach requires discussing a topic from multiple perspectives. "It requires a complete transformation of the curriculum and, in some cases, a conscious effort on the part of the teacher to deconstruct what they have been taught to think, believe, and teach". This can also be understood as 'decolonizing the curriculum'
- Decision Making and Social Action Approach – This approach includes all of the elements of the transformative approach, while challenging students to work to bring about social change. The goal is to make students aware of past and present injustice, but also to equip them and empower them to be change agents.

In looking into practical strategies for implementing multicultural education, Andrew Miller offers:

- Get to know your students. Build relationships and learn about their backgrounds and cultures.
- Use art as a starting point in discussions of cultural and racial issues.
- Have students create collective classroom slang dictionaries.
- Find places in your current curriculum to embed multicultural lessons, ideas, and materials (a continuous process, not merely the celebration of Black History Month or a small aside.)
- Allow controversy. Support respectful discussions about race, culture, and other differences.
- Find allies.

Another essential part of multicultural teaching is examining lesson materials for bias that might alienate students. The Safe School Coalition warns against using curricular material that "omits the history, contributions and lives of a group, if ti demeans a group by using patronizing or clinically distancing language, or if it portrays a group in stereotyped roles with less than a full range of interests, traits and capabilities."

=== Primary school ===
Multicultural education is introduced at a young age to allow students to build a global perspective. Critical literacy practices enable students to build an honest relationship with the world while recognizing multiple perspectives and ideologies. Teachers can use critical literacy practices to pose questions that will make students analyze, question and reflect upon what they are reading. Critical literacy can be useful by enabling teachers to move beyond mere awareness of, respect for, and general recognition of the fact that different groups have different values or express similar values in different ways. The three different approaches to critical literacy are:

- Examining texts for voice and perspective
- Using texts as a vehicle to examine larger social issues
- Using student's lives and experiences as the text and incorporating literacy practices

The choice of literature is important. Books must be chosen with consideration over how they represent the culture they consider, making sure that it avoids racial or cultural stereotypes and discrimination. Include books that:

- Explore differences rather than making them invisible.
- Enrich understandings of history and life and give voice to those traditionally silenced or marginalized.
- Show how people can begin to take action on social issues.
- Explore dominant systems of meanings that operate in our society to position people and groups of people as "others".
- Don't provide "happy ever after" endings for complex social problems,

"After reading these books, dialog can follow that will enable understanding and facilitate making connections to one's life. It is in this discussion that universal threads of similarities and the appreciation of differences may be explored in a way that will enable the students to make connections that span different cultures and continents. However rudimentary these connections may be, they serve as a starting point for a new way of thinking."

=== Secondary school ===
Focusing on minority groups can affect their future education. Camarota's Team Program, intended for high school Latino/a students of low socioeconomic status and considered "at risk" of dropping out, was made to help students improve test scores and complete credits. Students reported that they changed from not caring about school at all to having a sense of empowerment, which increased motivation to get better grades, finish school and have more self-confidence. According to student evaluations, 93% reported that the curriculum encouraged them to pursue a higher education. The students' college enrollment rate was higher than the national average for Latino/a students. When schools focus on inequities, school can create a positive, safe experience for minority students, where they feel empowered to continue their education and verify their importance.

Multicultural education can affect student self-perception. In one study, six students felt their multicultural self-awareness grew and felt supported after taking a multicultural education course aimed to see if their self-awareness altered. They reported that their cultural competency improved.

=== College ===
Some college syllabi do not offer teachers consistent ways of defining the principles of multicultural education or preparation for authentic multicultural education. It is important for teachers to be fully knowledgeable of multicultural education and remain open to long-term learning.

== Teacher education ==
New teachers can be blind to the diversity of their students, which can lead to generalizations and stereotypes. Multicultural education classes lead to increased knowledge of diversity, altering of attitudes towards multiculturalism, and preparedness of them teaching multicultural education to students of a variety of backgrounds. Preparing those teachers include being able to effectively confront fears and openness of talking about sensitive subjects, such as diversity issues and transforming attitudes that students may also possess towards different cultures. Multicultural education courses conclude eye-opening measures for the teachers, including becoming more open to such issues and positively affected preparedness to teach about multicultural education to their students.

A similar result happened in another study, in which the multicultural education course led to "increased awareness, understanding, and appreciation of other cultures." This includes having a better vision of a multicultural setting in a classroom, become more flexible when it comes to multicultural issues, and becoming more open to different perspectives of different students. Some pre-service teachers can still feel hesitant because of the lack of knowledge they still hold about multiculturalism, which can encourage further courses intended to educate teachers on the variety of cultures their students may possess.

== Challenges ==
=== Definition of culture ===
Fullinwider claims that activities that celebrate a culture's food or music fail to address the values and ideas behind these customs. Levinson claims that such practices could lead to "trivializing real differences; teachers end up teaching or emphasizing superficial differences in order to get at fundamental similarities". Fullinwider also discusses challenges that can arise when majority teachers interact with minority students: the distinction between "high culture" and "home culture" needs to be clear or else faculty and staff members could mistakenly withdraw their appropriate authority to evaluate and discipline students' conduct and work. Without a clear understanding of culture, educators could easily misattribute detrimental conduct or sub-par behavior to a minority student's cultural background or misinterpret signs that a student needs an intervention. Either would result in the student not receiving appropriate education.

=== Critiques ===
Multicultural education has been claimed to ignore "minority students' own responsibility for their academic performance." Another critique claims that "multicultural education theories and programs are rarely based on the actual study of minority cultures and languages." A third states, "The inadequacy of the multicultural education solution fails to separate minority groups that are able to cross cultural and language boundaries and learn successfully even though there were initial cultural barriers."

=== In-school application ===
Levinson claims that tenets of multicultural education have the potential to conflict directly with the purpose of educating in the dominant culture and that some tenets conflict with each other. This is apparent when considering whether multicultural education should be inclusive or exclusive. Levinson argues that preserving minority cultures requires teaching only about that culture (and excluding others). Levinson also finds a conflict between minority group preservation and social justice/equity. Some cultures, allow women to be treated in ways that are abhorrent in other cultures. Helping to preserve such a culture can also be seen as abhorrent.

Levinson even recommends segregating schools by culture so that students receive a "culturally congruent" education. She argues that in a homogeneous class it is easier to arrange curriculum and other practices to suit a specific culture and help students succeed within that culture. Such segregation, as she acknowledges, rejects multiculturalism.

Another challenge to multicultural education is that the amount of content in a given school tends to be related to the school's ethnic composition. That is, as Agirdag and colleagues claim, teachers tend to incorporate more multicultural content in schools with a higher share of minority students. Agirdag instead advocates for a consistent curriculum regardless of school demographics, in particular to ensure that majority culture students have sufficient exposure to other cultures.

=== Teacher culture ===
Banks 2005 proposed that the culture of teachers must adopt specific principles if multicultural education is to succeed:

- Teachers' personal beliefs must support multicultural education.
- Teachers must knowledge that beyond the official curriculum, a latent curriculum promotes norms that may not be articulated but that are understood and expected.
- Teachers must teach students to be global citizens, which requires teachers to embrace other cultures.

Fullinwider claims that teachers may fear bringing up matters within multicultural education, because while they could be effective, they might also be harmful. For example, studying history across races/ethnic groups could foster understanding amongst groups, but it could also cause create a hostile environment for students.

== See also ==
- Cultural identity
- Multiculturalism
