= Sweden: The Middle Way =

1936 book by Marquis Childs

- Title page for Sweden: The Middle Way (1936)
- Author: Marquis Childs
- Language: English
- Published: 1936
- Publisher: Yale University Press
- Publication place: United States

Sweden: The Middle Way is a book by Marquis Childs, an American journalist, chronicling his research on the reform policies of the Swedish Social Democratic Party based on his visits to the country as a reporter. First published in 1936, the book became an international bestseller, attracting wide attention to Childs' account of the Swedish economic and social system. Although later discredited to some degree as overly sweeping in its generalities, undercritical, and for other inaccuracies, the book is still considered influential in the way Sweden is viewed around the world.

In his early 30s at the time of the book's publication, Childs went on to win the 1969 Pulitzer Prize in Distinguished Commentary, the first person to win that award.

== Thesis ==
Childs' argument in the book was that Sweden had adopted an effective compromise between the two political extremes of the day: the United States and Russia (then the Soviet Union). Bridging the gap between the "concentration of economic power in the hands of a few men" in the United States and "the trials and hardships in Russia," Sweden seemed to have been able to address its social problems while retaining economic viability, primarily through its combination of a strong cooperative movement and active government involvement in managing the economy.

== Reaction ==
The most prominent reaction to the book came from President Franklin Roosevelt, who in June 1936 had dispatched a commission to Europe to study the prevalent use of cooperatives there. In a press conference, Roosevelt told reporters:

I became a good deal interested in the cooperative development in countries abroad, especially Sweden. A very interesting book came out a couple of months ago—The Middle Way. I was tremendously interested in what they had done in Scandinavia along those lines. In Sweden, for example, you have a royal family and a Socialist Government and a capitalist system, all working happily side by side. Of course, to be sure, it is a smaller country than ours; but they have conducted some very interesting and, so far, very successful experiments. They have these cooperative movements existing happily and successfully alongside of private industry and distributions of various kinds, both of them making money. I thought it was at least worthy of study from our point of view.

Already a best-seller before Roosevelt got interested in the book, the president's comments fortified its stature as one of the best-known American non-fiction books of the second half of the 1930s.

== See also ==
- Welfare in Sweden
- Nordic model
