= Trash talk =

Form of boast or insult commonly heard in competitive situations

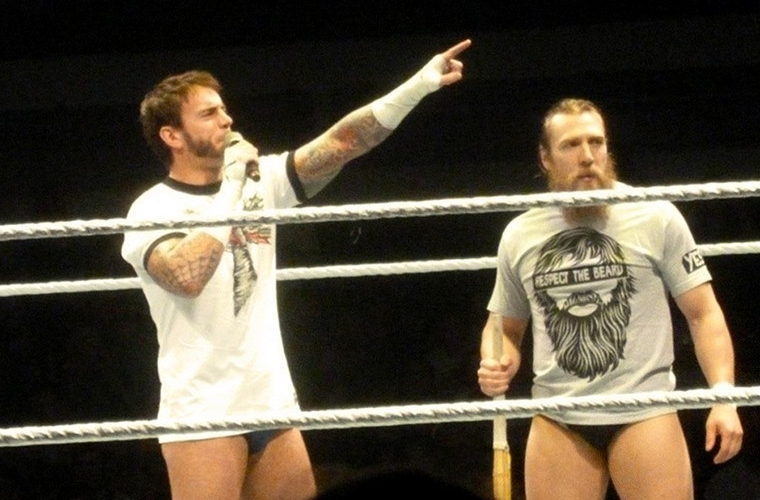
CM Punk in professional wrestling engaging in trash talk

Trash talk is a form of spoken insult usually found in sports events, although it is not exclusive to sports or similarly characterized events. It is often used to intimidate the opposition and/or make them less confident in their ability to win, but it can also be used in a humorous spirit. Trash-talk is often characterized by the use of hyperbole or figurative language, such as "Your team can't run! You run like honey on ice!" Puns and other wordplay are commonly used.

Trash-talk has become a debatable term, especially in North American sports, with the greatest trash talkers being acknowledged for both their trash-talking skills as well as their athletic and mental abilities. For example, Larry Bird is regarded as a prolific trash talker and was known for his athletic ability backing up his trash talk.

== Usage ==
In sports, trash talk most commonly comes in the form of insults to an opposing player's playing ability or physical appearance which is not ethically acceptable. The intended effects of trash talk are to create rivalry between the players and increase the psychological pressure of opposing players to perform well or to stop the trash-talker from performing well. Trash talk was famously used by heavyweight boxing champion Muhammad Ali in the 1960s and 70s.

In 1963, Ali even released a popular full-length record album consisting largely of trash-talk poetry. It was entitled I Am the Greatest!, a phrase that became his signature line. Since then, it has become common for boxers, wrestlers, and many other sports competitors to use trash talk. However, in amateur sports ranks, trash-talking is generally frowned upon as unsportsmanlike conduct (especially in youth leagues). Former UFC Featherweight and Lightweight Champion Conor McGregor is an example of a prominent trash-talker; he is considered to be the greatest trash-talker in MMA history. Former UFC fighter Chael Sonnen is also considered by many to be one of the greatest trash-talkers MMA has ever had. Although the practice of trying to distract opponents with verbal abuse is common to virtually all sports, other sports sometimes have their terminology for verbal abuse: for example, cricket calls it sledging and in ice hockey, it is called chirping.

The quality of performance of players under the pressure of trash talk is debated, but one study found that participants who were subject to a trash talk message exerted more effort in completing their task and perceived their opponent with more incivility and rivalry when compared to participants who were subject to a neutral, irrelevant, or no message at all.

While trash-talking frequently focuses on sporting attributes such as physical ability and athleticism, there is also significant trash-talking off-topic including opponent's sexual behavior and relationships. Zinedine Zidane infamously head-butted Marco Materazzi during the 2006 World Cup Final after Materazzi had leveled a puerile insult about Zidane's sister during a verbal exchange a few moments prior. Trash-talk is more prevalent in contact sports than non-contact sports, and it is also more prevalent between male competitors than female competitors.

== Types ==
=== Smack talk ===
Smack talk is a slang term seen in chat channels in chat room, blog, and online game conversations. The term came about in the early 1990s. It generally refers to the use of threatening or intentionally inflammatory language. Smack talk can also be used with bullying, whether that be face-to-face interaction, or cyber-bullying.

Smack talk is also a slang term used in sports. It refers to inflammatory comments made by a person or team in order to insult, anger, annoy or be boisterous toward their opponents. Although it began as a term used by sports fans and athletes, it has spread to all areas of culture where competition takes place. In the United States, it is synonymous with "trash talk".

==== In gaming ====
In many competitive games, trash talk is usually present and can be taken to extreme levels of disrespect. Like actual sports, trash talk can be used to belittle another player and pressure them to outperform the trash talker, cave into insults, or simply forfeit. Another type of trash talk that is commonly found in gaming is called "ragebait", an online phenomenon where a player will constantly provoke another player for no real reason other than to humor themselves or others playing with them. Ragebait usually ends up in getting a player to successfully to lash out or quit the game entirely.

To set a social context or to comply with massively multiplayer online games’ end user license agreement restrictions, MMOG groups may establish bylaws, traditions, or rules (formal or informal) that either permit, discourage, or prohibit the use of smack talk in their conversations and postings.

=== Talking shit ===
Talking shit is a term and type of trash-talk that refers to various types of derogatory language aimed at an individual or any type of entity, such as a group or organisation. Talking shit can be used as a tactic in fighting or brawling, used to draw attention to the matter among onlookers. This is a term that has been coined more recently and is used in reference when someone talks negatively about another person, concept, organisation, or entity. This may or may not include spreading false ideas. The same term can also be used to describe something spoken which is not true, uninteresting or irrelevant. It may be a contraction of "talking bullshit". Talking shit has also been shown to motivate the opponent. In a 2017 article Maurice Schweitzer wrote:

When people have to exert effort within a competition, some people engage in trash-talking, such as "You're a loser. That dollar is mine or I’m going to beat you like a rented mule." When people are the targets of these kind of messages, what we find is that they become much more motivated. They increase their effort and the performance goes up. Indeed, one key finding of our work is that targets of trash-talking become very motivated.

We ran some other studies to show that sometimes they may become so motivated they're likely to engage in unethical behavior to win. So, what people care about is outperforming this person who's trash-talking them. They're willing to both expend constructive effort but also engage in unethical behavior to make sure they outperform their competitor.

Talking shit is not to be confused with shitposting, which is when someone posts "content aggressively, ironically, and trollishly poor quality" to an online forum.

== Morality ==
The ethics of using trash talk as a strategy is debated. In sports, trash talking is often seen as unsportsmanlike, as throwing insults at opposing players goes beyond the limits and conventions of the game. Some argue, on the other hand, that trash-talking can be used as a valid strategy to increase tension in opponents and thus benefit from opponents' poor performance since any action not explicitly banned in the rules is permitted. According to a research project conducted by Marcus Fennel, a graduate student at the University of Idaho, trash talk decreases sportsmanship and instead promotes gamesmanship. Fennel describes gamesmanship as "the anti-ethical version of sportsmanship". Trash talking has the ability to diminish a player's motivation, which in turn could cause them to lose a love for their sport. In a study on how words affect the brain, it was discovered that negative words have the greatest effect on the prefrontal cortex. This region of the brain is in charge of the function of motivation; therefore, if it is constantly being fed negative triggers, an athlete's ability to maintain positive motivation is greatly diminished.

== In popular culture ==
Given the rapid increase in the popularity of the phrase, its appearance in popular media and culture is extensive. One of the earliest references can be found in Dobie Gray's hit song from 1965, "The 'In' Crowd", in which the third verse describes members "spendin' cash, talkin' trash" as part of the depiction of a desirable group membership. Trash talk has become ubiquitous in hip-hop culture and rap music.

== See also ==
- Umpire abuse
- The dozens
- Fighting words
- Flaming (Internet)
- Flyting
- Hip hop music
- Profanity
- Sledging (cricket)
- Wolf-whistling
- Antilocution
