= Marquis Childs =

American journalist

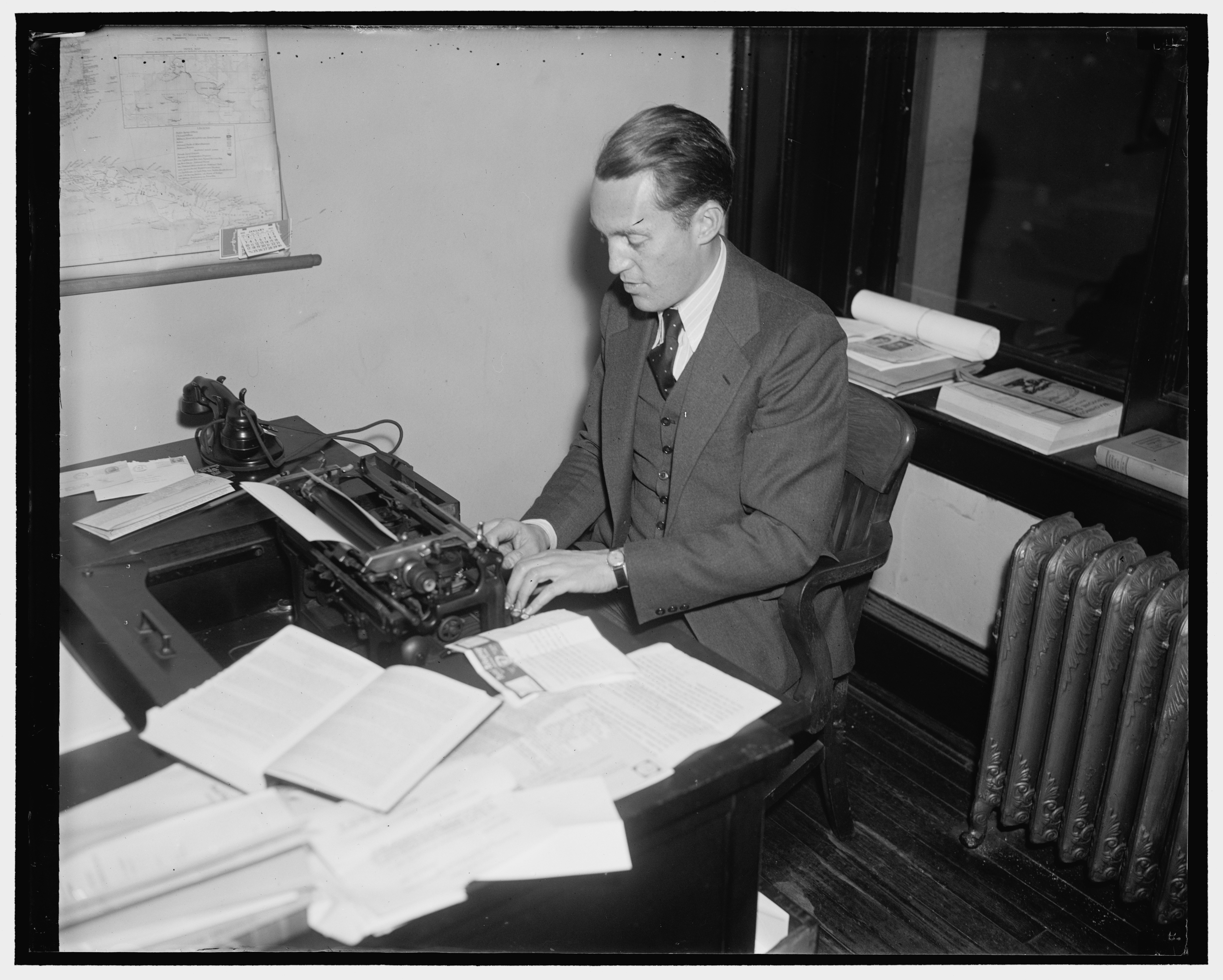
- Marquis Childs, correspondent for the St. Louis Post-Dispatch (1937)
- Born: Marquis William Childs; March 17, 1903; Clinton, Iowa, US
- Died: June 30, 1990 (aged 87); San Francisco, California, US
- Resting place: Clinton, Iowa, US
- Education: University of Wisconsin–Madison
- Occupation: Journalist
- Spouses: Anna "Lue" Prentiss (m. 1926; died 1968) Jane Neylan McBaine (m. 1969)
- Children: 2
- Writing career
- Language: English

Marquis William Childs (March 17, 1903 – June 30, 1990) was a 20th-century American journalist, syndicated columnist, and author.

== Early life and education ==
Childs was born on March 17, 1903, in Clinton, Iowa. He graduated from Lyons High School in Clinton in 1918, and received a B.A. in 1923 and Litt.D. in 1966 from the University of Wisconsin–Madison. After working for United Press in several Midwestern cities (including Chicago) since 1923, he attended the University of Iowa and completed his M.A. in 1925. In 1969, he obtained a second Litt.D. from the University of Iowa.

Following his college graduation, Childs worked briefly for United Press. He then returned to the University of Iowa to teach English composition before rejoining United Press, this time in New York. "My father," wrote Childs, "was a lawyer and his father was a farmer, as his forebears apparently had been since the time of Adam. Why I wanted, from the age of thirteen or fourteen, to be a newspaperman I've never quite understood."

== Career ==
=== Newspaperman ===
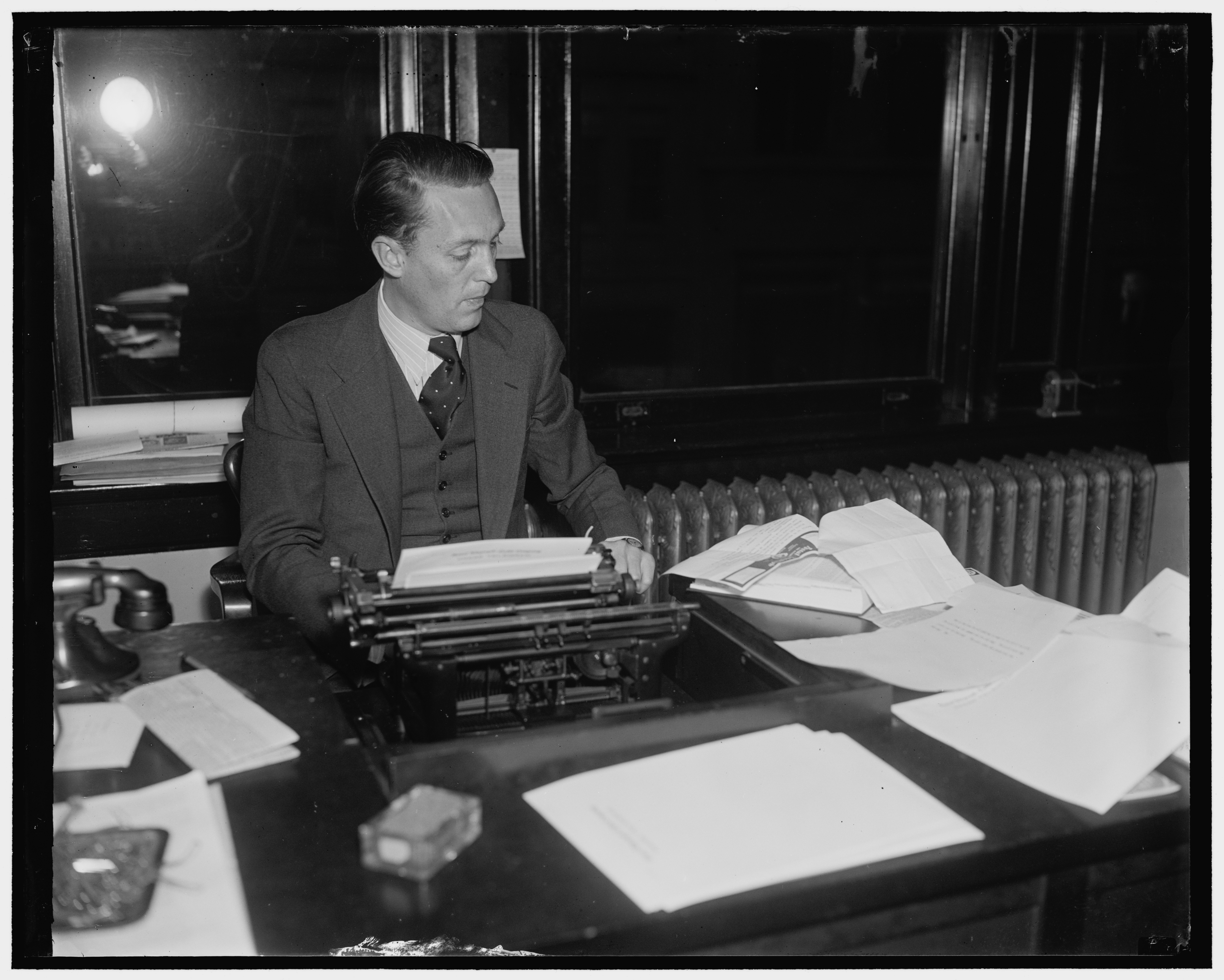
Marquis Childs in 1937

In 1925, Childs rejoined United Press and then in 1926 joined the St. Louis Post-Dispatch, where he would remain off and on until 1944, mostly serving as a feature writer for its American Mercury magazine section.

In 1932 Childs wrote an article for Harper's (published in the November issue) that was not so warmly received in his hometown. "River Town," a collection of thinly disguised tales of prominent Clinton citizens, was thought by natives to be at best in poor taste, and at worst, outrageous, although it was read by many with glee. (In 1951 Childs partially redeemed himself in the eyes of the offended with an article, "The Town I Like—Clinton, Iowa," which appeared in the May–June issue of the Lincoln-Mercury Times).

In 1933 Childs visited Europe, returning to the United States in June 1934 as a member of the Washington staff of the Post-Dispatch. He traveled 15,000 miles with President Franklin D. Roosevelt during the 1936 re-election campaign, and briefly with candidates Alfred M. Landon and Norman Thomas. A Harper's article entitled "They Hate Roosevelt!" was expanded into a campaign pamphlet and given wide circulation throughout the United States.

=== Foreign correspondent ===
Childs took a leave of absence from the Post-Dispatch to attend a housing exposition in Sweden; he remained there to write a series for the newspaper on Sweden's social and economic advances. A pamphlet and two books developed from this experience: Sweden: Where Capitalism is Controlled (1934), Sweden: the Middle Way (1936), and This is Democracy; Collective Bargaining in Scandinavia (1938). With Sweden: the Middle Way, Childs first came to literary prominence. Critics agreed that it showed "striking observation, faithful reporting, and vigorous journalism of a high order"; President Roosevelt was inspired to send a special commission abroad to study European cooperative systems.

Childs's first novel, Washington Calling! (1937), was called "unquestionably the most intelligent novel of Washington since Harvey Ferguson's Capitol Hill." That same year Childs traveled to Spain and wrote a series of articles on the Spanish Civil War for the Post-Dispatch. He expressed anti-Franco and pro-Loyalist sentiments.

The next country subjected to Childs's appraisal was Mexico. His series on oil expropriation was so controversial that a United States Senate investigation followed. He was chastised on and off the Senate floor by oilman and Senator Joseph F. Guffey of Pennsylvania. Childs sued Guffey for slander, won a full apology on the floor of the Senate, then withdrew the suit.

=== Wartime and post-war author ===
In the early 1940s, Childs published several books that won renewed critical acclaim: Toward a Dynamic America with William T. Stone; This Is Your War ("succinct and stimulating," said The New York Times); and I Write from Washington. During the spring of 1943, as guest of the Swedish Foreign Office, Childs again visited Sweden and became interested in the role of neutrals in World War II; this led him to investigate conditions in Switzerland, upon which he reported in a Saturday Evening Post article.

Relaxation for Childs during the war years came with horseback riding and figure skating—"When you're trying to keep your balance on a backward eight, you can't think about either your own or the world's troubles." He began writing his column Washington Calling in February 1944 and published The Cabin (an autobiographical novel) that year:

" 'Some day,' he said, 'I'll ride on trains whenever I want to ... I'll be important and at small towns people will look in at the window. They'll say, 'I've seen his picture in the newspapers.' Why he should have this fame was never clear in the fantasies he created within the still, closed pool of his mind."

During another stint with the Post-Dispatch (1954–1962), Childs wrote essays for American Heritage and Holiday and published: Ethics in a Business Society, which was translated into Japanese and Portuguese; The Peacemakers, which appeared in foreign language editions in Denmark, Sweden, The Netherlands, and France; The Ragged Edge: The Erosion of Individual Liberties; and best-sellers Eisenhower: Captive Hero and Walter Lippmann and His Times, co-edited with James Reston. Surprisingly, there are two three-act plays, Maud and Madame Minister, among the Childs materials collected by the University of Iowa.

=== Newspaperman again ===
In 1944, Childs rejoined his old news agency, the United Press. While at the United Press, the Post-Dispatch continued to carry his United Press work until he returned to the paper full-time in 1954.

On November 21, 1947, Childs wrote an essay that exposed the Justice Department's grand jury investigations into Soviet espionage and all but named Elizabeth Bentley as a witness. The grand jury investigations led to congressional testimony before the House Un-American Activities Committee by not only Bentley but also Whittaker Chambers during the summer of 1948 (during the presidential campaign season). Childs was a friend of Laurence Duggan, a Soviet spy or Communist fellow traveler as alleged by both Bentley and Chambers; Childs contributed to a private book memorializing Duggan.

The years 1954–1962 were spent as chief correspondent for the Post-Dispatch.

In 1962 as a contributing editor to the Post-Dispatch, Childs's column became syndicated in the United States and Canada by United Features Syndicate. The 1963 Britannica Book of the Year includes his article, "The New Europe: Unity and the Old Nationalism." He appeared many times on national television, notably "Meet the Press," and lectured throughout the United States. He won the 1969 Pulitzer Prize for distinguished commentary (the first such awarded) in 1970. His work also landed him on the master list of Nixon political opponents.

== Personal life ==
Childs pronounced his first name "MARK-us."

His first marriage on August 26, 1926, was to Anna 'Lue' Prentiss (April 8, 1902 - September, 1968). Their children were Henry Prentiss Childs and Malissa Marquis Childs (pen name "Malissa Redfield"). After Lue's death, he married Jane Neylan McBaine in August 1969.

On March 25, 1976, Childs returned to Clinton, Iowa, his appearance sponsored by funds administered by the Clinton Library Board. He was received with great warmth. At Clinton High School and in press interviews he reminisced about his youth in Clinton. He remembered ice skating on the frozen Mississippi River, the road shows at the Clinton Theatre, the good high school Lyons was, "and the people—I remember them. They were all characters—all with their own identities. They weren't rubbed into conformity by modern society."

On June 30, 1990, Marquis Childs died at the Children's Hospital of San Francisco in San Francisco, California from cardiovascular disease. He was buried in Oakland Cemetery, Clinton, Iowa.

== Awards ==
In 1945, Childs received the Sigma Delta Chi Award for "sustained insight in national affairs, first hand reporting, and effective writing." In 1951 he garnered the University of Missouri "distinguished service in journalism" award. That year he delivered the graduation address to a combined Clinton, Iowa, High School-Clinton Community College assembly and, on the same day, to Lyons High School graduates. He spoke on the value of individuality, a recurrent theme in his writing, speeches, and reminiscences.

In 1961, Childs received an order of chivalry from King Gustaf VI Adolf of Sweden, the Nordstjärneorden.

Childs was awarded the Golden Plate Award from the American Academy of Achievement in 1969.

== Works ==
In his epilogue to Witness to Power (1975), Childs wrote,

"My judgments have been tempered over the years by a growing awareness of the hazard of power. It may not be literally true that all power corrupts but the more it is exercised the more likely it is for the individual to deceive himself into believing that he is infallible. And when it comes to absolute power we have seen in this grisly century all too many examples of what that can mean."

=== Sweden ===
- Sweden: Where Capitalism is Controlled (1934), John Day: New York.
- Sweden: the Middle Way (1936), Yale University Press: New Haven.
- This is Democracy: Collective Bargaining in Scandinavia (1938), Yale University Press: New Haven.

=== United States ===
- They Hate Roosevelt! (1936), Harper & Brothers: New York & London.
- Washington Calling! (1937), W. Morrow: New York (a novel).
- Toward a Dynamic America: The Challenge of a Changing World (1941, with William T. Stone), Foreign Policy Association: New York.
- This Is Your War (1942), Little Brown: Boston.
- I Write from Washington (1942), Harper & Brothers: New York & London.
- Cabin (1944), Harper & Brothers: New York (a novel).

=== Post-war publications ===
- Which Way for America? (1947), Minneapolis.

The Farmer Takes a Hand: The Electric Power Revolution in Rural America (1952), Doubleday & Co: New York.

- Eisenhower: Captive Hero (date).
- Walter Lippmann and His Times (date), co-edited with James Reston.
- Witness to Power (1975), McGraw-Hill: New York.

== External sources ==
- Meet the Press (May 17, 1953): Martha Rountree with James Wechsler, Marquis Childs, Frank Waldrop, Bert Andrews, and Lawrence Spivak.
- History of Clinton County, Iowa (copyright 1978), Clinton County Historical Society
- Saxon, Wolfgang (July 2, 1990). Marquis W. Childs Is Dead at 87; Won a Pulitzer for Commentary. New York Times
- Papers of Marquis Childs
- "Newsman Marquis Childs, Pulitzer Winner, Dies". The Washington Post. July 2, 1990. Archived from the original on May 16, 2011 – via HighBeam Research.
- Marquis Childs Papers are housed at University of Iowa Special Collections
