= Umpire abuse =

Acts of abuse towards sport officials

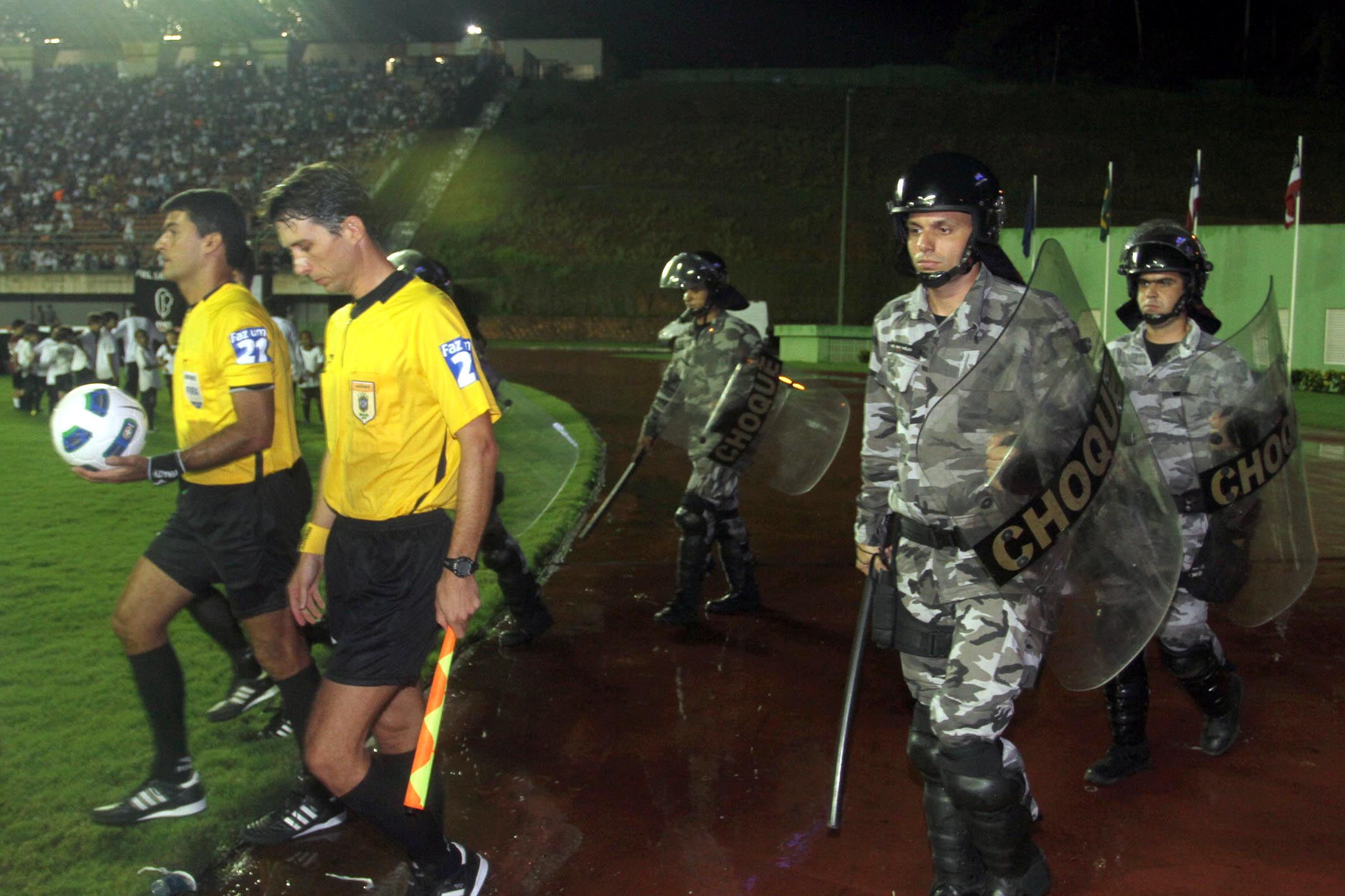
Association football referees in Brazil with police protection.

Umpire abuse refers to the act of abuse towards an umpire, referee, or other official in sport. The abuse can be verbal abuse (such as namecalling), or physical abuse (such as punching). For example, Australian Football League spectators use the term "white maggot" (derived from their formerly white uniforms) towards umpires at games, when they do not agree with an umpire's decision.

Umpire abuse has become quite common in sport, practiced by players, coaches and spectators, with one Australian Football league having half the tribunal cases heard about umpire abuse. There have also been some high-profile cases of abuse towards the umpires in sport, with one Australian football player suspended for life after striking an umpire.

== Notable cases ==
At the end of the 1996 Major League Baseball season, Baltimore Orioles player Roberto Alomar spat in MLB umpire John Hirschbeck's face during a dispute. Alomar received a five-game suspension for the incident, but the punishment would be served at the start of the 1997 season, not during the upcoming postseason, which allowed Alomar to participate in the Orioles' playoff games. MLB umpires, upset over the lack of an immediate suspension, threatened to go on strike before a federal judge prevented them from doing so. Ultimately, Alomar served the suspension at the start of the season as intended, and both him and Hirschbeck publicly apologized to each other the first game the two played and umpired in, with Alomar also donating to a ALD charity in Hirschbeck's honor.

During the 2008 Beijing Olympics, Angel Valodia Matos from Cuba pushed and then kicked a referee in the face during a Taekwondo match. He was disqualified for taking too much injury time in the bronze medal match by referee Chakir Chelbat, before kicking Chelbat in the face. The referee required stitches in his lip after the attack. The World Taekwondo Federation has banned Matos and his coach from taekwondo competitions for life.

In 2016, Mark Jamar, an Essendon AFL player was fined $1,500 for umpire abuse. The umpire, Mathew Nicholls, reported Jamar after he expressed his annoyance that he wasn't awarded a free kick in a marking contest.

In 2026, fans of the Hawthorn Hawks were shown throwing objects such as water bottles at umpires after officiating the preliminary final between the Hawthorn Hawks and Brisbane Lions. In response, the AFL warned that people who were found guilty of the act would face minimum five year bans.

== Penalties ==
Leagues and the like are trying to stop abuse towards umpires.

In Australian rules football, attempting to strike or striking an umpire, abusing or threatening an umpire, or disputing an umpires decision is a reportable offense, per the Laws of Australian Football. It is also possible to send a player off for up to the remainder of the game for abusing an umpire, however this is only usually practiced at amateur and junior level. There have also been other programs trailed, such as making players suspended for umpire abuse attend umpire training sessions.

In cricket, the preamble to the Laws of Cricket state that it is not within the spirit of cricket to abuse an umpire, and to dispute their decisions.

In ice hockey, it is against the rules to dispute a referee's decision, although the team captains can skate out and discuss the calls with the referees and linesmen. After a warning (and a minor penalty), arguing with a referee, or starting a fight with a referee is grounds for a game misconduct, which results in ejection for the offending player or coach.

In baseball, it is against the rules for any coach, manager, or player to question the umpire's judgement on a call on the field, or on balls and strikes. If a coach, manager, or player begins to walk toward the umpire with the intent to argue a call or balls and strikes, he will be warned to return to his bench or position. If he continues to advance, he will be ejected. Often, the subject will continue to argue the call until pulled away by another teammate, which is known as "getting their money's worth", as an ejection in all sports usually comes with an accompanying fine from the sanctioning body, and a further suspension for a number of games.

=== Legal implications ===
In the criminal justice system, some jurisdictions mandate more severe penalties when a person commits a crime against a sports official immediately prior to, during, or immediately following any athletic contest in which the umpire, referee, or judge is participating in an official capacity. For instance, in the US state of California, section 243.8 of its Penal Code specifies that battery against a sports official shall result in a fine that does not exceed more than $2000, or imprisonment with the sentence not exceeding one year. Battery against a sports official has more severe penalties than simple battery against a civilian, as in section 243. California's maximum incarceration penalty for battery on a sports official is twice as lengthy as the maximum sentence for simple battery.
