= Clyde R. Miller =

Clyde Raymond Miller
- Born: July 7, 1888
- Died: August 29, 1977 (aged 89)
- Occupations: Professor; author
- Known for: Co-founding the Institute for Propaganda Analysis

Clyde Raymond Miller (July 7, 1888 – August 29, 1977) was an associate professor of education at Teachers College, Columbia University who co-founded the Institute for Propaganda Analysis with Edward A. Filene and Kirtley F. Mather in 1937.

== Career ==
Miller began his career as a reporter for the Cleveland Plain Dealer. During World War I he wrote columns and articles related to patriotism and the activities of the Justice Department and participated in vigilante "spy hunts" with the American Protective League. He testified as a government witness in the high-profile prosecution of Eugene V. Debs under the 1917 Espionage Act, for speaking against the war effort. Miller detailed his role in the Debs case in an article in Progressive Magazine, October 1963.

In the 1930s Miller was a director of educational services and later an associate professor in the Columbia University Teachers' College. In 1937 he co-founded the Institute for Propaganda Analysis, and wrote extensively about the subject of propaganda techniques and how to detect them.

Miller's propaganda analysis techniques were significantly incorporated into the progressive curriculum policies of The Springfield Plan in the mid-1940s. The Springfield Plan was a widely lauded and emulated curriculum for intercultural education that was implemented in the public school system of Springfield, Massachusetts. The plan was the subject of several books, numerous academic journal articles, and it was the subject of a 1945 Warner Bros. short film, It Happened in Springfield, starring Andrea King.

Miller is the author of several books. His articles, speeches and essays were published in a number of journals, essay collections and magazines. In 1946 he published The Process of Persuasion.

== Personal life ==
He married Lotta MacDonald who was born in 1893 in Cleveland, Ohio. They lived in New York and had one son, Robert MacDonald Miller. Lotta died in November 1964. Her NYT obituary (Nov 16, 1964) lists her husband, Clyde R. Miller as a survivor. Miller died, while in Australia, on August 29, 1977, and he is buried at Lismore City, New South Wales, Australia.

== Books ==
- 1924: Publicity and the Public School, with Fred Charles, Boston: Houghton Mifflin Company
- 1939: How to Detect Propaganda, New York: The Town Hall, Inc. via HathiTrust
- Propaganda, Good and Bad, for Democracy
- What You Can Do to Promote Racial and Religious Understanding
- 1946: The Process of Persuasion, New York: Crown Publishers, via HathiTrust

== Articles ==
- "If You Would Detect Propaganda", The Rotarian, December, 1939.
- "Propaganda for Goose and Gander", The Rotarian, September, 1938.
- "The Man I Sent to Prison", Progressive Magazine, October 1963
- "A Radio Discussion of Propaganda", The University of Chicago Round Table (No. 89), November 26, 1939. Guests: Clyde Miller, H. C. Peterson, Maynard Krueger

== Sources ==
- Bresnahan, D. J. (1971). The Springfield Plan in Retrospect. Unpublished doctoral dissertation. Teachers College, Columbia University.
- Chatto, C I., & Halligan, A. L. (1945). The Story of the Springfield Plan. New York: Barnes and Noble.
- Johnson, L. (2006). "One community's total war against prejudice": The Springfield Plan revisited. Theory and Research in Social Education, 34(3), 301–323.
- Wise, J.W. (1945). The Springfield Plan. New York, NY: Viking Press.
