= Dislike =

Dislike may refer to:

- Dislike button
- Dislike, a 2016 Russian slasher film
