= Clyde Miller (Washington politician) =

American politician

Clyde J. Miller
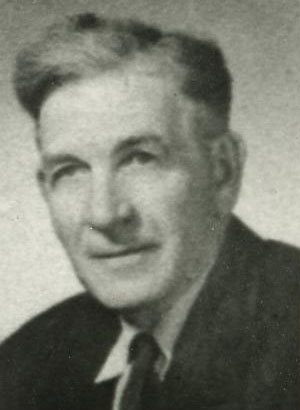
- Miller in 1949

Member of the Washington House of Representatives from the 18th district
- In office January 10, 1949 – October 3, 1958
- Preceded by: Thomas Hall
- Succeeded by: Shirley Marsh

Personal details
- Born: Clyde James Miller; April 25, 1887 Malcom, Iowa, U.S.
- Died: October 3, 1958 (aged 71) Longview, Washington, U.S.
- Resting place: Port Angeles, Washington, U.S.
- Party: Democratic

Clyde James Miller (April 25, 1887 – October 3, 1958) was an American politician in the state of Washington. He served in the Washington House of Representatives from 1949 until his death in 1958.
