= Abuse of a corpse =

Abuse of a corpse may refer to:

- Necrophilia — "abuse of a corpse" can be a euphemism for necrophilic acts
- Mutilation of a corpse
- Improper disposal of human remains
- List of practices considered disrespectful towards deceased persons
- Murder for body parts
- Body snatching
- Repatriation and reburial of human remains — treatment of remains prior to repatriation
- Category:Scandals about disposal of human corpses
