= International Race Officer of Sailing =

Race official

Race Officers are a type of race official used during the running of sailing races run under the Racing Rules of Sailing. Their role is primarily linked to on-the-water race management issues. Primarily they are responsible for laying the course and starting and finishing the races. The International Sailing Federation helps train its member national authorities, many of whom have a national race officers program. The most experienced become International Race Officials recognised by the International Sailing Federation.
