= World Sailing =

International sailing sports body

Coordinates: 50.8955°N 1.4051°W

- Sport: Sailing
- Official website: www.sailing.org
- Year of formation: 14 October 1907; 118 years ago
- Former names: International Yacht Racing Union; International Sailing Federation
- Membership size: 144 (2025)
- Other affiliation(s): IOC; ASOIF; IMO; ISO; WADA
- Patron: Haakon VIII of Norway
- President: Quanhai Li
- Vice-presidents: Özlem Akdurak; Philip Baum; Tomasz Chamera; Sarah Kenny; Yann Rocherieux; Cory Sertl; Marcus Spillane

Executive Office
- Address: London
- Chief Executive: David Graham
- Number of staff: Approx. 30

Continental Association
- Africa (ASF); Asia (ASCON); Europe (EUROSAF); Oceania (OSAF); South America (SASC)

World Sailing, formerly the International Yacht Racing Union and International Sailing Federation (ISAF), is the international sports governing body for sailing; it is recognized by the International Olympic Committee (IOC) and the International Paralympic Committee (IPC).

== History ==
The creation of the International Yacht Racing Union (IYRU) began in 1904, when Major Brooke Heckstall-Smith AINA, then Secretary of the Yacht Racing Association (now the Royal Yachting Association) wrote to the Yacht Club de France, pointing out the desirability of holding a conference for the purpose of devising an International Rule of Measurement for Racing Yachts acceptable to all European countries. As a result, an International Conference of Yacht Measurement was held in London in January and June 1906, at which the Metre Rule was developed. This group went on to adopt a formal Constitution after a meeting at the Yacht Club de France in Paris on 14 October 1907 which is seen as the formation date of the International Yacht Racing Union.

On 5 August 1996, the IYRU changed its name to the International Sailing Federation (ISAF).

On 14 November 2015, ISAF changed its name to World Sailing.

1. International Yacht Racing Union (IYRU) - 1904,1907 to 1995
2. International Sailing Federation (ISAF) - 1996 to 2014
3. World Sailing (WS) - After 2015

== Competition formats ==
Competitive sailing regattas contain events which are defined by a combination of discipline, equipment, gender, and sometimes categories. These criteria are defined by the race's purpose.

=== Disciplines ===
The following are the main disciplines:

- Fleet racing – The most common form of competitive sailing involving boats racing around a course.
- Match racing – Two identical boats race against each other. This one-on-one duel requires strategy and tactics. The first to cross the finish line wins.
- Team racing – Two teams, each of normally three boats, compete against each other. Fast-paced racing depends on excellent boat handling skills and rapid tactical decision-making.
- Offshore/oceanic – Any offshore race over 800 miles, including races around the world.
- Speed sailing - Is managed by World Sailing Speed Record Council
- Wave riding is common to board sports
- Both windsurfing and kiteboarding are experimenting with new formats.
- Cruising – Can be a coastal day sail or a longer distance international journey; it is the most commonly enjoyed sailing discipline.

=== Equipment ===
Common categories of equipment include the following: dinghies, multihulls, keelboats, sailing yacht, windsurfers, kiteboarding and radio-controlled sailboats. Within these categories, normally specific class or rating systems are used.

=== Gender ===
The Olympic Games included Women’s Classes of Sailing at the games of 1988. That was the same year that Olympic Boardsailing was added, for men only. The Barcelona Games of 1992 included Women’s Olympic Boardsailing at the Olympic Sailing Regatta on the Med Sea. The University Games of 1999 was the first Olympic Games that began with Women’s Olympic Classes and Men’s Olympic Classes from the inclusion of the Sport of Sailing. This Olympic Games Sailing regatta was from Palma de Mallorca, ESP. University Games are IOC sanctioned. These Games include students currently enrolled in full time studies that year, who also have Olympic Class status.

Sometimes the significance of women’s classes are understated as less important, because they let some women on men’s boats before the official inclusion. This focus tends to mixed events before acknowledging women-specific classes. For the 2016 Olympics, compulsory mixed gender in the event was added for the first time.

=== Sailor categories ===
In addition, the following categories are sometimes applied to events:

- Age
- Nationality
- Disabled classification
- Sailor classification

== Rules and regulations ==
World Sailing is now most familiar to sailors for defining the Racing Rules of Sailing (RRS), the international standard used to define competition rules and the framework within which racing is conducted.

Para sailing regattas for para sailors likewise follow the World Sailing rulebook with a minor change to permit things like powered adaptations. Strict classification requirements are enforced in the Paralympic Games for fair competition in Paralympic-class keelboats.

The key documents under control of World Sailing are:

- Racing Rules of Sailing (RRS) – The RRS Rulebook is updated on every Olympic year.
- Equipment Rules of Sailing (ERS)
- Offshore Special Regulations (OSR)
- World Sailing Regulations and Constitution

== Membership ==
=== National members ===
Like all sports federations, World Sailing is composed of "Member National Authorities" (MNAs) from over 140 countries all of whom have the right to make submissions to determine World Sailing's policies.

Persons with a physical impairment who are interested to learn to sail are encouraged to locate their national World Sailing Member National Authority (MNA), Disabled Sports Organization, or visit the local sailing club, as World Sailing seeks to people with disabilities into the sport.

=== Class associations ===
The federation recognizes over 80 classes which are each entitled to hold world championships.

=== Affiliated members ===
- Offshore Racing Congress (ORC)
- World Sailing Speed Record Council (WSSRC)
- International Radio Sailing Association (IRSA)
- International Monohull Open Classes Association (IMOCA)
- Snipe Class International Racing Association (SCIRA)

== Events ==
=== Sailing and the Olympics ===
World Sailing is responsible for administration of the Olympic Sailing Regatta. Sailing (called yachting in the early years) has been a mainstay of the modern summer Olympic games since 1896, omitted only from the 1904 summer games in St. Louis.

To help encourage high level international competition in the Classes used for the Olympic Games, World Sailing arrange the following events:

- Sailing World Championships this is held every four years and is the combined World Championships for the Olympic classes and used as part of the Olympic Qualifying procedure
- Sailing World Cup, an annual global sailing tour

=== Sailing in the Paralympic Games ===
Sailing as an equipment based sports allows one of the largest ranges of paralympians to compete under equal terms. Sailing was included for the first time in the Atlanta 1996 Paralympic Games program as a demonstration event. It became a full medal sport at the Sydney 2000 Paralympic Games up to 2020 were IPC removed sailing from the paralympic program. Work continues to get sailing reinstated for the 2028 Paralympics.

=== World Sailing classes world championships ===
Each World Sailing class is entitled to hold a world championship

=== World Sailing initiated world championships and events ===
The following World Championships are held:

- Sailing World Championships
- Sailing World Cup Series
- Youth Sailing World Championships
- Team Racing World Championship
- Offshore Team Racing World Championship
- Women's Match World Championship
- Open Match Racing World Championship (Presently awarded to the overall winner of the World Match Racing Tour)
- eSailing World Championship (2018 Onwards)
- Mixed Two Person Offshore Keelboat World Championship (2019 Onwards)
- Nations Cup match racing
- IYRU Women's World Championships (from 1978 to 1992)

=== World Sailing recognised world championships ===
- Offshore Racing Congress
- International Association for Disabled Sailing (IFDS)
- International Radio Sailing Association

=== World Sailing Special Events ===
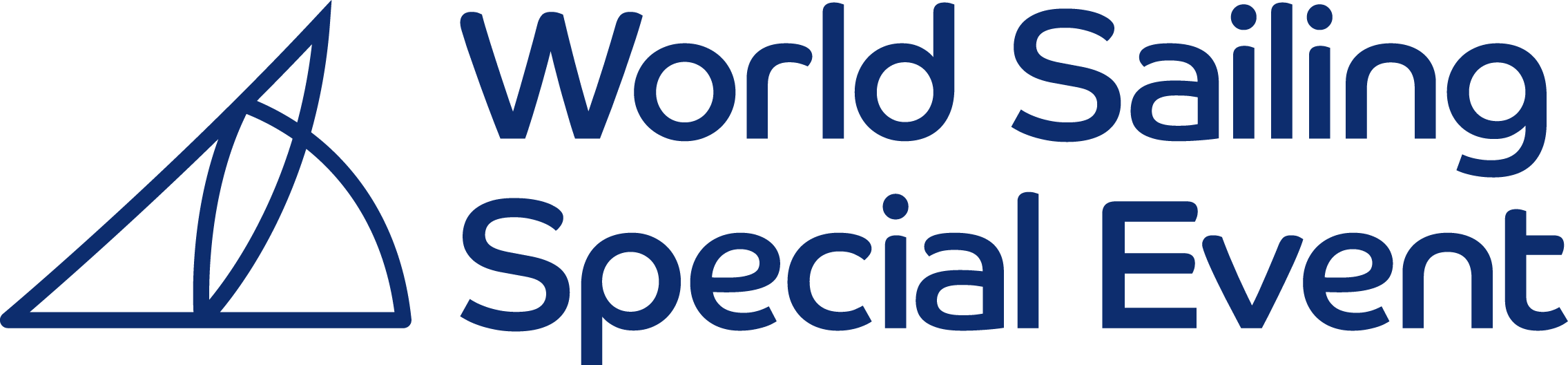

- America's Cup
- SailGP
- Star Sailors League
- The Ocean Race
- World Match Racing Tour
- PWA World Windsurfing Tour (Note: Professional Windsurfers Association)
- GKA Kite World Tour (Note: GKA Kite World Tour)
- Foiling Week (Note: Foiling Week)

== Disabled sailing ==
Sailing is a versatile sport that can accommodate many types of disability primarily because it is equipment based. Sailing is one of the few sports where disabled sailors compete on equal terms to able body sailors in a large section of the sport. Almost any boat can be sailed though some are more suitable for larger ranges of disabilities or specific categories of impairment.

World Sailing is also responsible for disabled sailing worldwide under the guidance of its own brand Para World Sailing. This is since the merger of International Association for Disabled Sailing (IFDS) in November 2014, and re-forming of the World Sailing Committee later rebrand Para World Sailing. The rational was given as follows: "The creation of a single governing body for Member National Authorities (MNAs) and sailors will better serve the needs and interests of sailors with disabilities, and provide consistency within the sport, from relationships with the World Anti-Doping Agency (WADA) to technical support and operational efficiencies."

The IFDS Foundation was dissolved during the 2015 Annual Conference in Sanya, China. The Disabled Sailing Committee then re-branded as the Para World Sailing Committee.

== People ==
=== Presidents ===
From 1906 to 1946 a chairman was elected from time to time to orchestrate the annual meetings.

- 1946–1955: Sir Ralph Gore was elected the first President
- 1955–1969: Sir Peter Scott
- 1969–1986: Beppe Croce (ITA)
- 1986–1994: Peter Tallberg (FIN)
- 1994–2004: Paul Henderson (CAN)
- 2004–2012: Göran Petersson (SWE)
- 2012–2016: Carlo Croce (ITA)
- 2016–2020: Kim Andersen (DEN)
- 2020–present: Quanhai Li (CHN)

=== Vice presidents ===
Vice presidents have been elected since 1955.

- 1998–2008: David Kellett (AUS)
- 1988–1994: Arturo Delgado (ESP)
- 1994–2000: Fernando Bolín (ESP)
- 2004–2012: David Irish (USA), Teresa Lara, Teo Ping Low (SIN)
- 2008–2012: Alberto Predieri (ITA), Eric Tulla, Tomasz Holc
- 2008–2016: Nazli Imre (TUR)
- 2012–2016: George Andreadis (GRE), Chris Atkins (GBR), Adrienne Greenwood
- 2010–2020: Gary Jobson (USA), Quanhai Li (CHN), Scott Perry (URU)
- 2016–2020: Jan Dawson (NZL), Torben Grael (BRA), Ana Sanchez (ESP), Nadine Stegenwalner (GER)
- 2020–present: Duriye Özlem Akdurak (TUR), Philip Baum (RSA), Tomasz Chamera (POL), Sarah Kenny (AUS), Cory Sertl (USA), Marcus Spillane (IRL), Jo Aleh (Athlete commission)

=== Presidents of Honour ===
- 1958–1991: King Olav V of Norway
- 1994–2023: King Constantine II of Greece
- 1994–2026: King Harald V of Norway
- 2026–present: King Haakon VIII of Norway

=== Race officials ===
There are four types of race officials used to conduct sailing events recognised by World Sailing as follows:

- International Judge
- International Measurer
- International Race Officer
- International Umpire

== Official awards ==
World Sailing hold the following awards together with service medals.

=== Rolex World Sailor of the Year ===
The main annual award the "Rolex World Sailor of the Year" that is sponsored by ROLEX in the following categories:

- Male World Sailor of the Year
- Female World Sailor of the Year

When a crew of two or three people is nominated, the awarded is presented to the entire crew. When larger crews win the award, normally only the skipper is recognised.

=== Hall of Fame ===
On 5 November 2007 in Estoril, Portugal, the International Sailing Federation announced the first six inductees for the ISAF Sailing Hall of Fame.

- Olin Stephens (USA)
- Dame Ellen MacArthur (GBR)
- Paul Elvstrøm (DEN)
- Barbara Kendall (NZL)
- Eric Tabarly (FRA)
- Sir Robin Knox-Johnston (GBR)

At the 2015 annual conference in Sanya, China, there were seven further inductees.

- Dennis Conner (USA)
- Alessandra Sensini (ITA)
- Harold Vanderbilt (USA)
- Sir Peter Blake (NZL)
- Buddy Melges (USA)
- Valentin Mankin (UKR)
- Torben Grael (BRA)

=== Beppe Croce Trophy ===
The Beppe Croce Trophy is presented to an individual who has made an outstanding voluntary contribution to the sport of sailing. The roll of honour includes Olympic medallists, rules gurus and designers, and all have dedicated an outstanding amount of time to the sport of sailing. Recipients are presented with a replica trophy.

== See also ==
- Category:Classes of World Sailing
- International Regulations for Preventing Collisions at Sea (COLREGS)
