= International Measurer of Sailing =

For boat racing, an International Measurer of Sailing is a type of highly experienced race official who has two principal functions in the sport of sailing: certification control and regatta equipment inspection.

For classes of yachts that require it, measurers check that new equipment (hulls, appendages, spas, sails, etc.) complies with class rules before it can be used in competition. Where required by the organizers of a regatta, measurers check that equipment during the regatta is compliant with class rules.

The most experienced measurers may become "International Measurers" recognised by the International Sailing Federation.

== See also ==
- International Sailing Federation
- Sailing competitions
