= International Judge of Sailing =

Judges are a type of race official used during the running of sailing races run under the Racing Rules of Sailing. Their role is primarily linked to being on a protest committee which is a panel of judges. In sailing, unlike many sports, due to the practical considerations involved (being on the water), umpiring (refereeing) is not very common. In the event of competitors not being able to resolve issues afloat, then a competitor or race committee may bring an issue in front of a protest committee for their consideration. The International Sailing Federation helps train its member national authorities many of whom have a national judges program. The most experienced become International Judges recognised by the International Sailing Federation.
