= International Umpire of Sailing =

Umpires are a type of race official used in the running of sailing races run under the Racing Rules of Sailing. Their role is primarily linked to making on the water decisions about rule infringements during match racing events or rule 42 calls during fleet racing. Most racing is run without umpires and unresolved issues are dealt with after the racing finished in front of a panel called the protest committee. The International Sailing Federation helps train its member national authorities many of whom have a national umpires program. The most experience become International Umpires recognised by the International Sailing Federation.
