= Name calling =

Directing insulting or demeaning labels

Name-calling is a form of argument in which insulting or demeaning labels are directed at an individual or group. This phenomenon is studied by a variety of academic disciplines such as anthropology, child psychology, and political science. It is also studied in rhetoric and a variety of other disciplines.

== In politics and public opinion ==
Politicians sometimes resort to name-calling during political campaigns or public events with the intentions of gaining advantage over, or defending themselves from, an opponent or critic. Often such name-calling takes the form of labelling an opponent as an unreliable and untrustworthy source, such as use of the term "flip-flopper".

== Common misconceptions ==
Gratuitous verbal abuse or "name-calling" is not on its own an example of the abusive argumentum ad hominem logical fallacy. The fallacy occurs only if personal attacks are employed to devalue a speaker's argument by attacking the speaker; personal insults in the middle of an otherwise sound argument are not fallacious ad hominem attacks.
