= World championships in sailing =

List of sailing championships

World championships in sailing are world championships organised or sanctioned by World Sailing (formerly the International Sailing Federation or ISAF). As a sport, sailing has the largest number of world championships due to the diversity of equipment and disciplines.

== Championships ==
The number of titles is due to the diversity of equipment. Sanctioned World Championships fall into the following categories:

=== World Sailing – Initiated Championships ===
| Championship | Event | Held | Frequency | Ref |
|---|---|---|---|---|
| Sailing World Championships | Male/Female/Mixed | 2003–present | Every 4 years | |
| Youth Sailing World Championships | Youth Male/Female/Open | 1971–present | Annual | |
| World Sailing Open Team Racing World Championships | Open | 1995–present | Variable | |
| ISAF Offshore Team Racing World Championship | Open | 2004–2010 | Semi-Annual | |
| Women's Match Racing World Championship | Female | Annual | | |
| Youth Match Racing World Championship | Youth | 2014 – | (Australia) Price, Williams & Blanc-Ramos (2017) | 4 |
| Para World Sailing Championships | Variable | Annual | | |
| IYRU Women's World Championships | Female | 1978 to 1992 | Annual | |
| eSailing World Championship | Open | 2018– | | |
| Mixed Two Person Offshore World Championship | Male & Female Pair | 2020 – | | |
| Class Committee Keelboat World Championship | Open | 2020 – | | |
| World Sailing Inclusion Championships | | 2025 – | | |

=== World Sailing – Sanctioned World Championships ===
- ISAF Open Match Racing World Championship (Presently awarded to the overall winner of the World Match Racing Tour originally a world sailing event)
- Nations Cup
- Offshore Racing Congress Rating System
  - Currently ORCi
  - former ORC Worlds include the IMS, IMS 500, IMS 670, 1/4 TON, 1/2 TON and 1 TON ClassWorld Championships
- International Radio Sailing Association Class World Championships
  - IRSA / 10 Rater World Championship
  - IRSA / Radio A Class World Championship
  - IRSA / Marblehead World Championships
  - IRSA / One Metre World Championships
- Extreme 40 World Championship (Authorised Once)
- International Association for Disabled Sailing (IFDS) (from 1990s to 2014)
- Blind Sailing World Championship originally recognised through IFDS
- Blind Match Racing World Championship originally recognised through IFDS
- Other Disabled Sailing World Championships (Such as none technical)
- PWA World Championships also recognised as a special event

=== World Sailing Classes – Fleet Racing ===
Classes that are members of World Sailing are entitled to hold World Championships provided participation levels are maintained (the number of nations depend of the size of the equipment).

==== World Sailing Classes - Female Titles ====
The following classes run separate fleets to award a female title:

- 420 World Championships
- 49er World Championships
- Europe World Championships
- Female Snipe World Championship
- ILCA 4 World Championships
- Women's ILCA 6 World Championship
- No Longer Held RS:X, 470, Mistral, Yngling

==== World Sailing Classes - Mixed Titles ====
The following classes run eparate fleets to award a female title:

- Nacra 17 World Championships
- Mixed J/70 World Championship
- 470 World Championships
- SKUD 18 Disabled Sailing World Championships (No Longer Held)

==== World Sailing Classes - Under 19 or Lower ====
- O'PEN Skiff World Championships
- Optimist World Championship
- ILCA 4 World Championships
- Youth ILCA 6 World Championships
- lots of youth classes limit the age by equipment suitability and are therefore not listed.

==== World Sailing Classes - Under 24 or lower ====
- 470 Junior World Championships
- 49er & 49erFX Junior World Championships
- RS:X Youth World Championships (No Longer Held)
- Youth Snipe World Championship
- ILCA Under 21 World Championships

==== World Sailing Classes - Masters Age ====
- Finn Master World Championship
- Masters Snipe World Championship
- ILCA Masters World Championships

=== World Sailing Classes – None Fleet Racing ===
- Formula 18 Raid Worlds (Coastal Fleet Racing)
- Optimist Team Racing Worlds (Inter Country Team Racing)
- International 14 Team Racing Worlds (Inter Country Team Racing)
- International Speed Windsurfing
- J/70 Corinthian World Championship

== Multiple World champions ==
This is not a complete list but the following are known to have won eight or more World Championship titles.

| Titles | Name | Country | Class(es) | Ref |
|---|---|---|---|---|
| 41 | Bjoern Dunkerbeck | | 7 × PWA Wave World Champion 1990, 1992–1995, 1999, 2001; 12 × PWA Overall World Champion 1988–1999; 5 × PWA Course Racing World Champion 1990–1994; 5 × PWA Racing World Champion 1995–1999; 9 × PWA Slalom World Champion 1988–1994, 2005, 2011; 1 × PWA Freestyle World Champion 1998; 2 × ISA Speed World Champion 1994, 2005; 1 × ISWC Speed World Champion 2016 | |
| 25 | Vasco Vascotto | Italy | J/24 (1999), TP52 (2015), IMS, ORC, Farr 40 | |
| 25 | Antoine Albeau | France | Windsurfing | |
| 16 | Glenn Ashby | Australia | A Class (1996, 2002, 2004, 2006, 2007, 2009, 2010, 2014, 2015, F18 (2004, 2005, 2007), Tornado (2006, 2008, 2009), GC32 (2018) | |
| 17 | John Kostecki | United States | Sunfish (1986), J/24 (1988), Soling (1986, 1988), Mumm 36 (1986,1997,1998), Farr 40 (1998, 2008, 2011, 2014), RC44 (2010), Soto 40 (2014), J/70 (2016), Melges 20 (2016), TP52 (2017) Star (2025) | |
| 15 | Terry Hutchinson | United States | IMS, J/24; Corel 45 (1996, 1998), TP52 (2008, 2010, 2013, 2014, 2018, 2022, 2025), Farr 40 (2014, 2016, 2017), RC44 (2017) | |
| 14 | Darren Bundock | Australia | Formula 16 (2011), Formula 18 (2004, 2005, 2007, 2011, 2019, 2025), Tornado (1998, 2001, 2003, 2004, 2006, 2008, 2009) | |
| 13 | András Domokos | Hungary | Flying Dutchman (1994, 2002, 2003, 2004, 2006, 2008, 2010, 2011, 2012, 2014, 2015, 2017, 2019) | |
| 13 | Paul Elvstrøm | Denmark | 5.5 (1967), 505 (1957, 1959), Dragon, Finn (1958, 1959), Flying Dutchman (1962), Soling (1969, 1974), Star (1966, 1967), Snipe (1959), Half Ton (1972, 1981) || | |
| 13 | Robert Scheidt | Brazil | Youth Worlds ILCA (1991), Laser (1995, 1996, 1997, 2000, 2001, 2002, 2004, 2005, 2013), Star (2007, 2011, 2012) | |
| 13 | Szabolcs Majthényi | Hungary | Flying Dutchman (1994, 2002, 2003, 2004, 2006, 2008, 2010, 2011, 2012, 2014, 2015, 2017, 2019) | |
| 13 | Piotr Tarnacki | Poland | Micro Cupper World Championship | |
| 12 | Anna Livbjerg | Denmark | Europe (2012,2013,2014,2015,2016,2017,2018,2019,2021,2022,2023,2024) | |
| 11 | Ben Ainslie | Great Britain | Laser Radial (1993), Youth Worlds (1995), Laser (1998, 1999), Finn (2002, 2003, 2004, 2005, 2008, 2012), Match Racing (2010) | |
| 11 | Kristian Nergaard | Norway | 5.5 Metre (1990 1993 1996 2003 2008 2009 2012 2015 2016 2019 2020) | |
| 11 | Stellan Berlin | Sweden | 2.4m Open (2000, 2002, 2004, 2006, 2008, 2011, 2013, 2014, 2015, 2017, 2018) | |
| 11 | William (Bill) Hardesty | United States | WMRT (2011, 2012), Farr 40 (2012), Melges 20 (2013, 2015), Melges 24 (1999, 2007), Etchells (2008, 2011, 2014), J/70 (2015) | |
| 11 | Federico Michetti | Italy | Melges 20 (2010,2012), Melges 24 (2000, 2008, 2010, 2011, 2013), Melges 32 (2016), ClubSwan 50 (2021, 2023), TP52 (2022) | |
| 10 | Johan Barne | Sweden | Soling/Match (1996, 1999), TP52 (2009, 2017), 5.5 Metre (2009 2012 2015 2016 2019 2020) | |
| 10 | Ken Read | United States | J/24 (1985, 1986, 1991, 1992, 1993, 1994), Etchells (2003), 12 Metre (2019) | |
| 10 | Mathew Belcher | Australia | 420 (2000), 470 (2010, 2011, 2012, 2013, 2014, 2015, 2017, 2019), Etchells (2018) | |
| 10 | Nick Craig | Great Britain | Enterprise (4 times), OK (5 times), B14 (2018) | |
| 10 | Claus Hoj Jensen | Denmark | H-boat x10 | |
| 9 | Frederik Dahl Hansen | Denmark | H-boat x9 | |
| 9 | Jørgen Bojsen-Møller | Denmark | Flying Dutchman (1998 1990 1993 2001 2005 2007 2009 2016 2018) | |
| 8 | Nathan Outteridge | Australia | | |
| 9 | Adrian Stead | Great Britain | Farr 40 (1998, 2007, 2008), RC44 (20??, 2016); TP52 (2010, 2011, 2013), Swan 60 OD (2013) | |
| 9 | Anna Livbjerg | Denmark | Europe (2011, 2012, 2013, 2014, 2015, 2017, 2018, 2019, 2021) | |
| 9 | Christian Schaefer | Germany | Tempest (1992, 1995, 1996, 2000, 2001, 2002, 2003, 2005, 2011) | |
| 9 | Dave Curtis | United States | Soling, J/24; Etchells x7 | |
| 9 | Ross Halcrow | NZL | Soto 40 (2014), 6m (2022), ClubSwan 50 (2021), RC44 (2022, 2023), TP52 (2017, 2019, 2023), Maxi 72 (2017) | |
| 9 | Willem Van Waay | United States | Farr 40 2002, J/22 2026, J/24 2019, 2023, J/70 2015, 2017, 2021, J/80 2022, Sonar 2022 | |
| 8 | Augie Diaz | United States | WS Youth Worlds (1973), Snipe, Snipe Masters, Star (2016) | |
| 8 | Graham Bantock | Great Britain | 10 Rater (1999), A Class (2005), One Metre (1994, 1999), Marblehead (1992, 1994, 1996, 1998) | |
| 8 | James "Skip" Baxter | New Zealand | Farr 40 (2004 2009), TP52 (2008, 2010, 2011), RC44 (2010), ORC/IRC 2018 | |
| 8 | Nick Craig | Great Britain | OK (2005 2006 2007 2011 2017), Enterprise (), B14 (2017, 2019) | |
| 8 | Eduardo Cordero | Venezuela | Sunfish (1993, 1996, 1997, 1999, 2000, 2001, 2002, 2004) | |
| 8 | Heiko Kröger | Germany | 2.4m Open, Norlin Mk3 Disabled (2016) | |
| 8 | Brad Gibson | Great Britain; Australia | 10 Rater (2016,2018), One Metre (2007,2015), Marblehead (2012,2014,2016,2018) | |
| 8 | Vincent Hösch | Germany | Star (1981) Tempest (1993); Dragon (2003, 2007); H-Boat (1991, 1992, 1994, 2003) | |
| 8 | Iordanis Paschalidis | Greece | Tornado (2011, 2012, 2013, 2014, 2015, 2016, 2017, 2018) | |
| 8 | Konstantinos Trigkonis | Greece | Tornado (2011, 2012, 2013, 2014, 2015, 2016, 2017, 2018) | |
| 8 | Jesper Bank | Denmark | | |
| 8 | Blair Tuke | New Zealand | 49er x6 29er Splash | |
| 8 | Jonathan McKee | United States | FD 1983, 49er 2001, Tasar (1996, 2007), Melges 24 (2005, 2010, 2011), ORCi 2023 | |

== See also ==
- List of World Championships medalists in sailing
- World Sailing
- European Sailing Championships
