= Vasco Vascotto =

Italian sailor (born 1969)

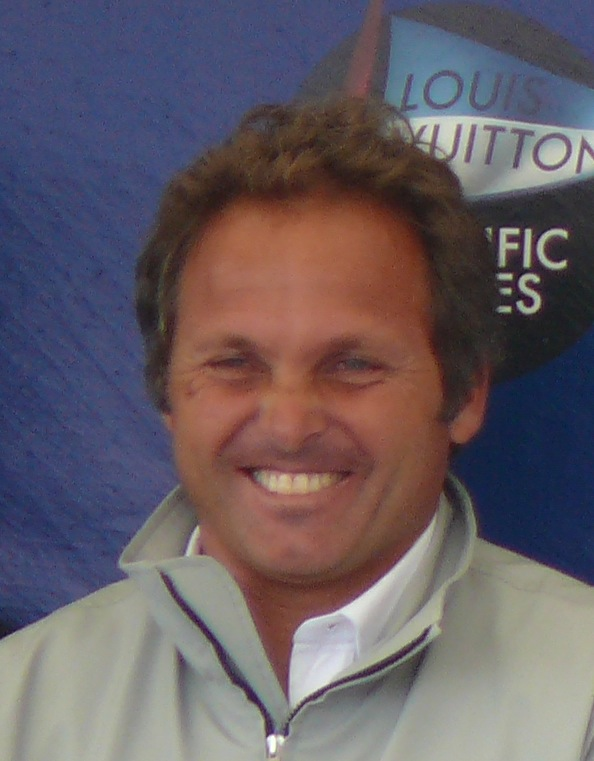

Personal information
- Full name: Vasco Vascotto
- Nationality: Italy
- Born: 10 October 1969 (age 56) Trieste

Sailing career
- Sport: Sailing
- Club: C.D.V. Muggia
Medal record
Representing Italy
Event	1st	2nd	3rd
World Championships	25	?	?
Total	25	?	?
Sailing
World Championships
Gold medal – first place	1999 Genova	J/24
Gold medal – first place	2003 Porto Cervo	Farr 40
Gold medal – first place	2010 Casa de Campo	Farr 40
Gold medal – first place	2012	RC 44
Gold medal – first place	2013	Soto 40
Gold medal – first place	2013 Rhodes Island	Farr 40
Gold medal – first place	2015	TP52

Vasco Vascotto (born 10 October 1969) is an Italian sailor who has won 25 World Championships titles which is believed to be the most of any sailor. Although he started as a dinghy sailor his professional career has focused on yachts. He won the Admirals Cup in 1999 and then sailed with Mascalzone Latino as skipper and tactician competing in the Louis Vuitton Cup 2007 the challenger series for the America's Cup.

Known World Championships titles are as follows:

Pos.	Role	Boat	Boat Name	Title	Location	Ref
1st	Skipper	ILC 30	Ornella All Attacco	1998 ORC ILC 30 World Championship	Bajona (ESP)	
1st	Skipper	ILC 30	Ornella All Attacco	1999 ORC ILC 30 World Championship	(BRA)	
1st	Skipper	Sydney 40	Merit Cup	1999 Sydney 40 World Championship		
1st	Helm	J/24	Bagua	1999 J/24 World Championship	Genova	
1st	Tactician	Mumm 30	Mascalzone Latino	2000 Mumm 30 World Championship	Miami Beach	
1st	Helm	Farr 42	Mascalzone Latino	2000 Cruiser/Racer IMS Offshore World Championships		
1st		Farr 40 OD	Nerone	2003 Farr 40 World Championship	Porto Cervo (ITA)	
1st	Helm	Grand Soleil 42R	Meridiana-Italtel	2004 IMS Offshore World Championships	Porto Cervo (ITA)	
1st		X-37	Telefoncia	2008 ORC 670 World Championship]]		
1st		Farr 40 OD	Nerone	2010 Farr 40 World Championship	Casa de Campo	
1st		RC44	Team Aqua	2012 RC44 World Championship	Rovinj (CRO)	
1st		Soto 40 OD	Pisco Sour	2013 Soto 40 World Championship	Talcahuano (CHI)	
1st		Farr 40 OD	ENFANT TERRIBLE	2013 Farr 40 World Championship	Rhodes Island	
1st	Tactician	TP 52	Enfant Terrible	Class A 2015 ORC World Championships	Barcelona	
1st		TP 52	Azzura	2015 TP52 World Championship		
1st		TP 52	Platoon	2023 TP52 World Championship		}
