= Melges 32 World Championship =

Series of sailing competitions

The Melges 32 World Championship is an annual international sailing regatta for Melges 32 keelboats, organized by the host club on behalf of the International Melges 32 Class Association and recognized by World Sailing, the sports IOC recognized governing body.

== Calendar ==
Event		Host			Participation				Ref.
Ed.	Year	Host club	Location	Country	Boats	Ath.	Nat.	Cont.	Ref.
1	2009	Yacht Club Costa Smeralda	Costa Smeralda	Italy	29				
2	2010	St. Francis Yacht Club	San Francisco	United States	32				
3	2011	Real Club Nautico de Palma de Mallorca	Palma de Mallorca	Spain	29				
4	2012	New York Yacht Club	Newport, Rhode Island	United States	33				
5	2013	Yacht Club Porto Rotondo		Italy	26				
6	2014	Coconut Grove Sailing Club	Miami	United States	17				
7	2015	Yacht Club Favignana	Trapani, Sicily	Italy	22				
8	2016	Sail Newport	Newport, Rhode Island	United States	13				
9	2017	Club Nautico e della Vela Argentario	Monte Argentario	Italy	17				
10	2018	Yacht Club Cagliari	Cagliari	France	18				
11	2019	Real Club Náutico de Valencia	Valencia	Spain	15				
12	2020	Marina di Villasimius	Villasimius, Sardinia	Italy	12				
13	2021	Lega Navale Italiana	Villasimius, Sardinia	Italy	9				
14	2022		Olbia	Italy	7				

== Multiple World Champions ==
Compiled from the data below the table includes up to and including XXXX.

Ranking	Sailor	Gold	Silver	Bronze	Total	No. Entries"	Ref.

== Results ==
Year	Gold	Silver	Bronze
2009; Porto Cervo ITA; 29 Boats	BLIKSEM - USA 169 Pieter Taselaar (AUS); Jeremy Wilmot (AUS); Paul Atkins (AUS); Michael Coxon (AUS); Alex Clegg (USA); Nathan Wilmot (AUS); Williem Van Waay (USA); George Peet (USA)	JOE FLY - ITA 999; Giovanni Maspero (ITA)	UKA UKA RACING - ITA 1 L. Santini (ITA); Armando Giulietti (ITA)
2010 32 Boats	ITA 23 B-lin sailing Luca Lalli (ITA); Lorenzo Bressani (ITA); Federico Michetti (ITA); Flavio Favini (ITA); Carlo Zermini (ITA); Luca Faravelli (ITA); Stefano Nicolussi (ITA); Lorenzo Del Rio (ITA)	USA 49 FULL Throttle; John Porter (USA)	USA 32 STAR; Jeff Ecklund (USA)
2011; Palma ESP; 29 Boats	GOOMBAY SMASH - USA 2 William Douglass (USA); Chris Larson (USA); Marco Constant (RSA); Andy Escourt (NZL); Stuart Pollard (AUS); Mark Towill (USA); Chris Welch (USA); Alan Nakanishi (USA)	SAMBA PA TI - USA13131	FANTASTICA - ITA212
2012; Newport USA; 33 Boats	Samba Pa Ti - USA 13131 John Kilroy (USA); Paul Goodison (GBR); Harry Melges III (USA); Federico Michetti (ITA); Justin Smart (GBR); Marco Carpinello (ITA); Luca Faravelli (ITA); Martino Tortarolo (ITA)	Hedgehog - BER 1	Warpath - USA 32917
2013; ITA; 26 Boats	ARGO - USA 128 Jason Carroll (USA); Cameron Appleton (NZL); Scott Norris (USA); Anthony Kotoun (ISV); Lindsay Bartel (USA); Weston Barlow (USA); Eric Aakhus (BRA); Peter Crawford (USA)	Fantastica - ITA 212	Groovederci - USA 201
2014; Miami USA; 17 Boats	ARGO - USA 128 Jason Carroll (USA); Cameron Appleton (NZL); Weston Barlow (USA); Anthony Kotoun (ISV); Mike Kuschner (USA); Graham Landy (USA); Scott Norris (USA); Phillip Wehrheim (USA)	Torpyone - ITA 487 Edoardo LUPI (ITA)	Mamma Aiuto - JPN 199 Naofumi KAMEI (JPN)
2015; Favignana ITA; 22 Boats	Stig - ITA 65 Alessandro Rombelli (ITA); Francesco Bruni (ITA); Giorgio Tortarolo (ITA); Pierluigi De Felice (ITA); Michele Giovannini (ITA); Daniele Fiaschi (ITA); Luca Faravelli (ITA); Filippo La Mantia (ITA)	Argo - USA 128	Volpe - USA 180
2016; Miami USA; 13 Boats	Volpe - USA 180 Ryan DeVos (USA); Mike Hill (USA); Peter Kinney (USA); Mark Mendelblatt (USA); Scott Nixon (USA); Erika Reineke (USA); Sam Rogers (USA); Drew Wierda (USA)	STIG - ITA 65	Argo - USA 128
2017; Cala Galera ITA; 17 Boats	TAVATUY - RUS 223 Pavel Kuznetsov (RUS); Konstantin Besputin (RUS); Egor Koniukhovskii (RUS); Oleg Krivov (RUS); Evgeny Neugodnikov (RUS); Alexander Patrushev (RUS); Anton Sergeev (RUS); Valeriy Zatsarinskiy (RUS)	TORPYONE - ITA 487 Edoardo Lupi (ITA) Massimo Pessina (ITA)	FRA MARTINA - ITA 191 Edoardo Pavesio (ITA)
2018 ita 18 Boats	RUS 223 - Tavatuy Alexander Patrushev (USA); Egor Konuhovski (RUS); Evgeny Neugodnikov (RUS); Konstantin Besputin (RUS); Oleg Krivov (RUS); Valeriy Zatsarinskiy (RUS); Pavel Kuznetsov (RUS); Anton Sergeev (RUS)	ITA 172 - GIOGI	ITA 186 - CAIPIRINHA
2019; Valencia ESP; 15 Boats	GER 229 - LA PERICOLOSA Alberto Viejo (ESP); Christian Schwoerer (GER); Elliot Willis (USA); Fabian Gielen (USA); Jaro Furlani (ITA); Michele Gregoratto (ITA); Nic Asher (USA); Vittorio Zaoli (ITA)	ITA 110 - CALVI NETWORK Carlo Alberini (ITA)	NOR 212 - PIPPA Lasse Pettersson (NOR)
2020; Villasimius ITA; 12 Boats	ITA 186 CAIPIRINHA Martin Reintjes (ITA); UNKNOWN; UNKNOWN; UNKNOWN; UNKNOWN; UNKNOWN	GER 229 LA PERICOLOSA Christian Schwoere (GER)	GER 215HOMANIT Jan Jasper Wagner (GER); Maximilian Stein (GER)
2021; 9 Boats	GER 229 - LA PERICOLOSA Christian Schwoerer (GER); Nic Asher (GBR); Jas Farneti (ITA); Jaro Furlani (ITA); Michele Gregoratto (ITA); Alberto Viejo (ESP); Elliot Willis (GBR); Vittorio Zaoli (ITA)	RUS 223 - TAVATUY; Pavel Kuznetsov (RUS)	GER 193 - WILMA; Fritz Homann (GER)
2022; 7 Boats	NOR 186 - PIPPA Lasse Petterson (NOR); Enrico Verdinelli (ITA); Raimondo Tonelli (ITA); Gabriele Benussi (ITA); Pietro De Luca (ITA); Andrea Rachelli (ITA); Filippo Togni (ITA); Vittorio Zaoli (ITA)	ITA 181 - ENFANT TERRIBLE Alberto Rossi (ITA)	GER 193 - WILMA Fritz Homann (GER)
