= Farr 30 World Championship =

World Championship in the Farr 30/Mumm 30

The Mumm 30 World Championship laterly known as the Farr 30 World Championship was an annual international sailing regatta for Farr 30 class, they are organized by the host club on behalf of the International Farr 30 Class Association and recognized by World Sailing, the sports IOC recognized governing body. The class gained World Sailing recognition at the end of Nov 1997 until 2018.

The trophy for the world championship is over 100 year old and gifted from the Royal Canadian Yacht Club trophy, the winners were also awarded a jeroboam of Mumm Champagne.

== Editions ==
Host cities of the Farr 30 World Championship

Edition			Host			Participant				Ref
Ed.	Date	Year	Host club	Location	Nat.	Boats	Sailors	Nations	Cont.	Ref
1	15-19 Oct	1997		Dimanche	France	31		10+	3+	
2	14-20 Nov	1998	South Carolina Yacht Club		United States	35		5+	3+	
3	13-18 Sep	1999	Royal Southern Yacht Club	Hamble-le-Rice	United Kingdom	31	206	10	2	
4	8-11 Nov	2000	Storm Trysail Club	Miami	United States	40		8+	4+	
5	3-6 Oct	2001		Cagliari, Sardina	Italy	45	301	12	4	
6	25-28 Sep	2002	Annapolis Yacht Club	Annapolis	United States	33		6+	3+	
7	8-11 Oct	2003		Portoferraio (Elba Island)	Italy	41	288	16	4	
8	22-25 Sep	2004	Royal Canadian Yacht Club	Toronto	Canada	21	349	16	4	
9	1-4 Jun	2005	Societe Nautique de la Trinite	La Trinite	France	40	251	15	4	
10	29 Nov to 2 Dec	2006	Sail Newport	Miami	United States	30		11+	4+	
11	4-7 Oct	2007	Yacht Club Costa Smeralda	Porto Cervo	Italy	39	258	20	4	
12	24-27 Sep	2008	Sail Newport	Newport	United States	21		5+	3+	
N/A	3-9 Oct	2009		Porto Rotondo, Sardinia	Italy	CANCELLED				
13	28-31 Oct	2010		Hyeres	France	11	75	6	2	
14	8-11 Sep	2011	St. Francis Yacht Club	San Francisco	United States	12	80	6	3	
15	30 Jul to 5 Aug	2012	Båstad Sailing Week	Bastad	Sweden	19	124	12	3	
16	17-20 Jul	2013	Sail Newport	Newport	United States	13	87	9	3	
17	24-30 Aug	2014	Royal Danish Yacht Club	Copenhagen	Denmark	16	107	12	4	
18	12-17 Oct	2015	Corinthian Yacht Club of Seattle	Seattle	United States	14		1+	1+	

== Multiple World Champions ==
Compiled from the data in the medallist table below the number of entries is an under estimation as for a couple of year the full crew list were not published.

Ranking	Sailor	Gold	Silver	Bronze	Total	No. Entries”	Ref.
1	Darren Jones (AUS)	6	1	0	7	11	
2	Deneen Demourkas (USA)	3	0	0	3	10	
2	Andrew Hudson (AUS)	3	0	0	3	3	
2	Cameron Appleton (NZL)	3	0	0	3	3	
5	Pierre Loic Berthet (FRA)	2	0	1	3	3	
6	Tristan Eldershaw (AUS)	2	1	0	3	5	
7	Curtis Florence (CAN)	2	0	0	2	5	
7	Guillaume Berenger (FRA)	2	0	0	2	4	
7	Phil Wehrheim (USA)	2	0	0	2	3	
7	Kate Mckay (CAN)	2	0	0	2	2	
7	Stephane Geslin (FRA)	2	0	0	2	2	
7	Francesco Di Caprio (ITA)	2	0	0	2	2	

== Medallists ==
Year	Gold	Silver	Bronze	Ref.
1997; Marseille; 31 Boats	INTRUDER - GBR 5830; Chris Law (GBR); UNKNOWN; UNKNOWN; UNKNOWN; UNKNOWN	Malinda - ITA 3024; Antonio Sodo Migliori (ITA); Massimo Mezzaroma (ITA)	Sector - ITA 3033; Francesco Iacono (ITA)	
1998; Hilton Head; 35 Boats	Sissabella; Luca Bassani (ITA); UNKNOWN; UNKNOWN; UNKNOWN; UNKNOWN	USA 48; Ed Collins (USA); Barry Allardice (USA)	Off The Gauge; Jack LeFort (USA)	
1999; Hamble; 31 Boats	USA 50 Ed Collins; Liz Mahon (USA); Suzy Leech (USA); Tyler Moore (USA); Judson Smith (USA); Robert Allardice (USA)	Magnumm - NED 44; Walter GEURTS NED	Ovington Boats (like) - GBR 1305; Mark Heeley	
2000; Miami Beach; 40 Boats	Mascalzone Latino (GB92) - ITA 2121; Vincenzo Onorato (ITA); UNKNOWN; UNKNOWN; UNKNOWN; UNKNOWN	Seven (GB63) - ITA 3063; Alberto Signorini (ITA); Tomasso Chieffi (ITA)	USA 48 (30048) - USA 48; Ed Collins (USA); Barry Allardice (USA)	
2001; Cagliari; 45 Boats	ALINA ITA-3073 Luca Valerio (ITA); Maurizio Abba (ITA); Herman Horn Johannessen (NOR); Daniele Cassinari (ITA); Giuseppe Devoti (ITA); Paolo Mereghetti (ITA); Fulvio Manuelli (ITA)	BANCA FINNAT EURAMERICA - ITA-3036; Andrea Cecchetti (ITA)	ILTENET WIND - ITA-3063; Pierpaolo Cristofori (ITA)	
2002; Annapolis; 33 Boats	ALINA - ITA 3073; Giuseppe Abba (ITA); UNKNOWN; UNKNOWN; UNKNOWN	PRINTEL WIND - ITA 63; Paolo CRISTOFORI (ITA)	STEADFAST - CAN 4 Fred SHERRATT (CAN)	
2003; Portoferraio; 41 Boats	Cheyenne - ITA 13078 Claudio Recchi (ITA); Giuseppe Maletto (ITA); Carla Ubertalli (ITA); Francesco Di Caprio (ITA); Roberto Martinez (ITA); Massimo Bortoletto (ITA); Hamish Pepper (NZL)	Kismet - ITA 3058; Stefano Leporati (ITA)	Bitipi - MON 1999; Savino Formentini (MON)	
2004; Toronto; 21 Boats	Foreign Affair; Richard Perini (AUS) Steve Flam (USA); Curtis Florence (CAN); Tristan Eldershaw (AUS); Chris Cook (AUS); Darren Jones (AUS); Jason Rowed (AUS)	Steadfast; Fred Sherratt (CAN)	Tramp; Thomas Ritter (USA)	
2005; La Trinité sur Mer; 40 Boats	Bouygues Telecom - FRA 18348 Pierre Loic Berthet (FRA); Mathieu Richard (FRA); Laurent Simon (FRA); Greg Evrad (FRA); Stephane Geslin (FRA); Sebastien Metivier (FRA); Emmanuel Soupiot (FRA)	Toulon Provence Mediterranee Coych - FRA 83; Fabien Henry	ASTERIX - GBR 3093; David Evans	
2006; Miami Beach; 30 Boats	Twins - FRA 007 Erik Maris (FRA); Guillaume Berenger (FRA); Eric Quesnel (FRA); Bruno Jeanjean (FRA); Benjamin Enon (FRA); Gildas Philippe (FRA); Jean Sebastian Ponce (FRA)	Foreign Affair - AUS 6133; Richard PERINI (AUS)	Sixx - USA 6 Tom LIHAN (USA)	
2007; Porto Cervo; 39 Boats	MATRIX ARCA TX ACTIVE - ITA 3111 Luigi Amedeo Melegari (ITA); Francesco dal Bon (ITA); Davide di Maio (ITA); Giovanni Boem (ITA); Francesco Di Caprio (ITA); Enrico Zennaro (ITA); Tommasso Chieffi (ITA)	BARKING MAD - USA 65; Jim Richardson (USA)	(27) NEW CALEDONIA - FRA 988; Pierre Loic Berthet (FRA)	
2008; Newport; 21 Boats	Optimum - AUS 7151 Guy Stening (AUS); Darren Jones (AUS); Stephen McConaghy (AUS); Tristram Eldershaw (AUS); Curtis Florence (CAN); Stephen Quigley (AUS); Tim Davis (AUS)	Barking Mad - USA 65; Jim Richardson (USA)	Mascalzone Latino - ITA 2121; Vincenzo Onorato (ITA)	
2009	event cancelled			
2010; Hyères; 11 Boats	Courrier Dunkerque - FRA 59 Daniel Souben (FRA); Pierre Loic Berthet (FRA); Guillaume Berenger (FRA); Nicolas Dore (FRA); Stephane Geslin (FRA); Edouard Marie Alikiagalelei (FRA); Arthur Ponroy (FRA)	Nouvelle-Calédonie - FRA 988; Bernard Malleret (FRA)	Ville du Port Region Reunion - FRA 974; Gabriel Jean Albert (FRA)	
2011; San Francisco; 12 Boats	USA 706 - Groovederci Deneen Demourkas (USA); Cameron Appleton (NZL); John Cameron Biehl (USA); Patrick Gavin-Brynes (USA); Austin Herlihy (USA); Andrew Hudson (AUS); Darren Jones (AUS)	USA 65 - Barking Mad; Jim Richardson (USA)	USA 57 - Eight Ball; Scott Easom (USA)	
2012; Båstad; 19 Boats	USA 706 - Groovederci Deneen Demourkas (USA); Cameron Appleton (NZL); Darren Jones (AUS); Dana Riley (USA); Andrew Hudson (AUS); Kate McKay (CAN); Philip Wehrheim (USA)	SWE 381 - Farrbar 2 Martin Strandberg (SWE)	USA 50955 - Barking Mad; Jim Richardson (USA)	
2013; Newport, RI; 13 Boats	Groovederci - USA 706 Deneen Demourkas (USA); Cameron Appleton (NZL); Darren Jones (AUS); Philip Wehrheim (USA); Andrew Hudson (AUS); Kate McKay (CAN); Zac Maxam (USA)	Barking Mad - USA 65; Jim Richardson (USA)	Ramrod - USA 683; Rodrick Jabin (USA)	
2014; Copenhagen; 16 Boats	GER 5373 - Topas Harald Brüning (GER); Jan-Hinnerk Brüning (GER); Dave Scott (USA); Kai Harder (GER); Julian Ramm (GER); Malte Pasler (GER); David Chapman (AUS)	Matrisen; Martin Strandberg (SWE)	Orca; Patrick Lindblom (SWE)	
2015 Seattle; 14 Boats	USA 683 - Ramrod Rodrick Jabin (USA); Darren Jones (AUS); Chris Larson (USA); UNKNOWN; UNKNOWN	USA 40 - Seabiscuit; Kevin McNeil (USA)	CAN 18 - Through; Andrew Hamilton (CAN)	
