= Terry Hutchinson =

American sailor

Personal information
- Nationality: American
- Born: Annapolis, Maryland, U.S.

Sport
- Country: USA
- Sport: Sailing
- College team: Old Dominion University

Terry Hutchinson is an American professional sailor and one of the most successful in modern yacht racing. His career spans dinghy & inshore grand prix racing, Offshore Racing, the America's Cup, Super Yacht racing and executive leadership roles.

Hutchinson has won 18 World Championships across multiple classes, including the J/24, Corel 45, TP52, RC44, Maxi 72, Farr 40 and IMS fleets, is a two‑time recipient of the Rolex Yachtsman of the Year award (2008, 2014) and match racing Congressional Cup winner. Over more than three decades, he has won a multitude of North American, European, and Australian championships in classes including the Melges 24, J/70, Mumm 30, Mumm 36, Farr 40, Maxi 72, and IMS.

Hutchinson has competed in five America's Cups and in the Volvo Ocean Race. In 2007, he served as tactician for Emirates Team New Zealand to win the Louis Vuitton Cup. He also won six TP52 World Championship titles as helm and tactician. Hutchinson has been an early competitor in foiling multihull racing, serving as both driver and tactician in the Extreme Sailing Series and as winning helm in the AC45 World Series on foiling catamarans.

== Background ==
Terry Hutchinson grew up in Annapolis, Maryland, where he began sailing at a young age with his family, going on to compete locally on the Chesapeake Bay and beyond. He attended St. Mary's High School in Annapolis, racing in ILCA (Laser), International 420, and J/24 classes, though did not compete for St. Mary's as they did not have a sailing team. Hutchinson went on to attend & sail for Old Dominion University, where he competed for four years with the Monarchs and earned the distinction as four‑time All‑American skipper, two-time College Sailor of the Year and winning multiple national college championships. Hutchinson was inducted into Old Dominion University's Sports Hall of Fame in 1995, the Maryland State Athletic Hall of Fame in 2018 and was honored with the Mystic Seaport Museum's America and the Sea Award in 2021.

== Career ==
Hutchinson's career, which began as a youth sailor in 420s and Lasers (ILCA) encompasses a broad range of competitive disciplines, including dinghy sailing, inshore grand prix racing, offshore competition, sailmaking, the Volvo Ocean Race and five America's Cups. He has earned world championships in multiple classes and contributed to winning programs as helmsman, tactician and team leader. His competitive record reflects a long‑standing commitment to disciplined preparation, continuous improvement, and the development of high‑performing teams. Hutchinson is known for a data‑driven approach to performance and for building programs that emphasize innovation, contributing to long-term competitive success.

Hutchinson earned first team All-American honors in each of his four years at Old Dominion University and helped lead the Monarchs to four national championships: Sloop Championship in 1989 and 1990, Coed Dinghy Championship in 1989, and Team Racing Championship in 1990. He received the ICSA College Sailor of the Year award in 1989 and 1990 and was named Old Dominion's alumni Association's Male Athlete of the Year in 1990.

Right afterwards, he won the Key West Race Week in 1990 and 1991 (Class 1 with "Collaboration"); 1992 (Class 2 with "Sensation"); 1994, 1995 and 1996 (Class 2 with "Flash Gordon"); and 1998 (Class 1 with "Bright Star").

In between, he also won the Congressional Cup in 1992, his first World Championship, at the 1995 Corel 45 Worlds with "Titan", and the National Championship in Mumm 36 with "Sandman" in 1997. In 1998, he took his second Worlds in Corel 45 with "Heatwave".

In the J/24 class, he became North American Champion in 1997 and repeated in 1998, when he also won the World Championship in Argentia, with "Evita".

In 2000, Terry Hutchinson, as helmsman of "Vim", a Nelson/Marek 43 won the Racing Division title in the IMS Offshore World Championship.

Hutchinson went on to achieve multiple wins in the Farr 40 class including the Farr 40 World Championship in 2004 2009, 2014, 2016 and 2017 as tactician, the Farr 40 North American Championship, Farr 40 Europeans, Farr 40 Australian Nationals, Cowes Week the California Cup.

He also won the TP 52 World Championship title in 2008, 2010, 2011, 2014 and 2022, 2025 as both helmsman and tactician of Quantum Racing.

He sailed in the 2001–02 Volvo Ocean Race as tactician on Djuice Dragons.

=== World Championship Titles ===
Pos.	Role	Boat	Boat Name	Title	Location	Ref
1st		Corel 45	"Titan"	1995 Corel 45 World Championship		
1st	Helm	Corel 45	"Heatwave"	1998 Corel 45 World Championship		
1st	Helm	J/24	"Evita"	1998 J/24 World Championship		
1st	Helm	Nelson/Marek 43	"Vim"	2000 IMS Offshore World Championship		
1st		Farr 40 OD	"Barking Mad"	2004 Farr 40 World Championship		
1st	Helm	TP 52	Quantum Racing	2008 TP52 World Championship		
1st		Farr 40 OD	"Barking Mad"	2009 Farr 40 World Championship		
1st	Helm	TP 52	Quantum Racing	2010 TP52 World Championship		
1st	Tactician	TP 52	Quantum Racing	2011 TP52 World Championship		
1st	Tactician	TP 52	Quantum Racing	2014 TP52 World Championship		
1st	Tactician	Farr 40 OD	"Plenty"	2014 Farr 40 World Championship		
1st	Tactician	IMA - Maxi 72	Bella Mente	2015 IMA Maxi 72 World Championship		
1st	Tactician	Farr 40 OD	"Plenty"	2016 Farr 40 World Championship		
1st	Tactician	Farr 40 OD	"Plenty"	2017 Farr 40 World Championship	Porto Cervo (ITA)	
1st	Tactician	RC44 OD	"Team Nika"	2017 RC44 World Championship	Marstrand (SWE)	
1st		TP 52	Quantum Racing	2018 TP52 World Championship		
1st	Tactician	TP 52	Quantum Racing	2022 TP52 World Championship		
1st	Tactician	TP 52	Quantum Racing	2025 TP52 World Championship		

=== America Cup ===
Hutchinson has been part of five America's Cup campaigns:

- AC 30 2000 Louis Vuitton Cup, Mainsail trimmer: America One
- AC31 2003 Louis Vuitton Cup, Tactician: Stars & Stripes
- AC32 2007 Louis Vuitton Cup Champion, Tactician: Emirates Team New Zealand
- AC32 2007 America's Cup, Tactician: Emirates Team New Zealand
- 2011–13 America's Cup World Series, Helm/Tactician: Artemis Racing
- AC36 2021 Prada Cup, CEO & Skipper: American Magic
- AC37 2024 America's Cup, Skipper and President of Sailing Operations: American Magic
