= Farr 40 World Championship =

World Championship in the Farr 40

The Farr 40 World Championship was an annual international sailing regatta for Farr 40 class, they are organized by the host club on behalf of the International Farr 40 Class Association and recognized by World Sailing, the sports IOC recognized governing body. The class gained World Sailing recognition from 1997 until 2022.

The event was largely sponsponser by Rolex and was a pinnacle event. Featuring the highest profile sailors from the Olympic, America's Cup and Volvo Ocean Race crewing for what was an Owner/Driver Class with limited numbers of professionals allowed aboard.

== Editions ==
Host cities of the Farr 40 World Championship

Edition			Host			Boats	Sailors			Ref.
No.	Date	Year	Host club	Location	Nat.	No.	No.	Nats	Cont.	Ref.
1		1998	UNKNOWN	Miami	United States	19		4+	3+	
2	11-14 Sep	1999	St. Francis Yacht Club	San Francisco	United States	19		5+	3+	
3	6-9 Jun	2000	Newport Hotel and Marina / Storm Trysail Club	Newport, Rhode Island	United States	27		8	4	
4	12-15 Sep	2001	Royal Yacht Squadron	Cowes	United Kingdom	22		11	3	
5	13-16 Nov	2002	Atlantis Resort on Paradise Island	Nassau	Bahamas	25	235	12	5	
6	2-5 Jul	2003	Yacht Club Costa Smeralda	Porto Cervo	Italy	37	358	20	6	
7	8-11 Sep	2004	St. Francis Yacht Club	San Francisco	United States	31		9	4	
8	1-4 Mar	2005	Cruising Yacht Club of Australia	Sydney	Australia	28		9+	3+	
9	6-9 Sep	2006	New York Yacht Club	Newport, Rhode Island	United States	38		12+	4+	
10	29 Aug - 1 Sep	2007	Royal Danish Yacht Club	Copenhagen	Denmark	36	348	18	4	
11	16-19 Apr	2008	Miami Beach Marina / Storm Trysail Club	Miami	United States	33	322	17	5	
12	24-27 Jun	2009	Yacht Club Costa Smeralda	Porto Cervo	Italy	25	229	14	4	
13	21-24 Apr	2010	Casa de Campo Yacht Club	Casa de Campo	Dominican Republic	10	100	10	4	
14	23-26 Feb	2011	Royal Sydney Yacht Squadron	Sydney	Australia	20	201	12	4	
15	17-20 Sep	2012	Chicago Yacht Club	Chicago	United States	20	198	13	5	
16	27-30 Aug	2013	New York Yacht Club	Newport, Rhode Island	United States	15	147	11	5	
17	15-18 Oct	2014	St. Francis Yacht Club	San Francisco	United States	19		12	5	
18	24-27 Sept	2015	Long Beach Yacht Club, California	Los Angeles	United States	17	165	9	3	
19	16-19 Feb	2016	Royal Sydney Yacht Squadron	Sydney	Australia	12	123	10	4	
20	13-16 Jul	2017	Yacht Club Costa Smeralda	Porto Cervo	Italy	8		9+	3+	
21	6-9 Oct	2018	Chicago Yacht Club	Chicago	United States	14	139	9	3	
22	2-5 Oct	2019	Long Beach Yacht Club, California	Los Angeles	United States	14	136	11	4	
N/A		2021	Cruising Yacht Club of Australia	Sydney	Australia	NOT HELD DUE TO COVID				

== Multiple World Champions ==
Compiled from the data in the medallist table below.

Ranking	Sailor	Gold	Silver	Bronze	Total	No. Entries”	Ref.
1	Morgan Trubovich (NZL)	6	2	3	11	14	
2	James "skip" Baxter (NZL)	5	2	4	11	15	
3	Terry Hutchinson (USA)	5	2	3	10	12	
4	Massimo Bortoletto (ITA)	3	3	2	8	14	
5	Vasco Vascotto (ITA)	3	3	1	7	12	
6	Jenn Wulff (USA)	3	2	1	6	8	
7	Cesare Bozzetti (ITA)	3	3	0	6	9	
8	Alexander Roepers (USA)	3	2	0	5	11	
9	Greg Gendell (USA)	3	2	0	5	7	
9	John Kostecki (USA)	3	2	0	5	6	
11	Vincenzo Onorato (ITA)	3	1	0	4	10	
12	Jim Richardson (USA)	3	0	6	9	16	
13	Daniele Fiaschi (ITA)	3	0	1	4	7	
14	Adrian Stead (GBR)	3	0	0	3	7	
14	Gerry Mitchell (GBR)	3	0	0	3	8	
14	Matteo Savelli (ITA)	3	0	0	3	6	
14	Andriano Figone (ITA)	3	0	0	3	4	
14	Andrea Ballico (ITA)	3	0	0	3	5	
14	Davide Scarpa (ITA)	3	0	0	3	5	
20	Giulio Scarselli (ITA)	2	2	0	4	8	
20	Marco Carpinello (ITA)	2	2	0	4	7	
20	Massimo Mezzaroma (ITA)	2	2	0	4	9	
20	Mark Langford (AUS)	2	2	0	4	4	
24	Matt Mcdonough (USA)	2	1	3	6	9	
25	Francesco Coari (ITA)	2	1	1	4	7	
26	Chris Cook (AUS)	2	1	0	3	6	
26	Fletcher Sims (USA)	2	1	0	3	3	
26	Emil Wester (DEN)	2	1	0	3	7	
29	Zach Hurst (NZL)	2	0	4	6	8	
30	Linda Lindquist-Bishop (USA)	2	0	3	5	7	
31	Antonio Rankin (USA)	2	0	1	3	5	
32	Russell Coutts (NZL)	2	0	0	2	3	
32	Monica Rampoldi (ITA)	2	0	0	2	3	
32	Dimitri Simons (NED)	2	0	0	2	4	
32	Marco Cornacchia (ITA)	2	0	0	2	4	

=== Medallists ===
Year	Gold	Silver	Bronze
1998	USA 50955 - Barking Mad Jim Richardson (USA); Adrian Stead (GBR); David Brooke (AUS); Gerry Mitchell (GBR); Chris Sherin (USA); Wes Richardson (USA); Tom Duggan (USA); Tim O'Brien (USA); Peter Jones (USA); Shelly Coutin (USA)	AUS 1770 - Southern Star John Calvert-Jones (AUS); CREW UNKNOWN	USA 40031 - Wired Steve Garland (USA); Helga Garland (USA); CREW UNKNOWN
1999 San Francisco	USA - Samba Pa Ti John Kilroy (USA); Eric Arndt (USA); Justin Smart (USA); Matt Ciesicki (USA); Hogan Beatie (USA); Morgan Trubovich (NZL); Jen Dunbar (USA); Ann-Marie Deritter (USA); Keith Lorence (USA)	Mascalzone Latino Vincenzo Onorato (ITA); CREW UNKNOWN	Barking Mad Jim Richardson (USA); CREW UNKNOWN
2000 Newport, Rhode Island	AUS - Southern Star John Calvert-Jones (AUS); Grant Simmer (AUS); Adam Beashel (AUS); Mark Walsh (AUS); Carsten Schon (NZL); Glenn Attrill (AUS); Richard Cameron (USA); Rebecca Pancera (USA); Glen Ferguson (AUS); Peter Stalkus (USA); Amy Neale (AUS)	USA - Samba Pa Ti John Kilroy (USA); CREW UNKNOWN	GRE - Atalanti George Andreadis (GRE); CREW UNKNOWN
2001 Cowes	SUI - Alinghi Ernesto Bertarelli (SUI); Michel Bonnefous (SUI); Enrico De Maria (SUI); Patrick Huguenin (SUI); Andrew Graham (SUI); Russell Coutts (NZL); Warwick Fleury (NZL); Simon Daubney (NZL); Curtis Blewitt (CAN)	AUS - Southern Star John Calvert-Jones (AUS); Grant Simmer (AUS); Adam Beashel (AUS); Mark Walsh (AUS); CREW UNKNOWN	GBR - Warlord VII Philip Tolhurst (GBR); CREW UNKNOWN
2002 Paradise Island	LE RENARD; Steve Phillips (USA); Maxine Prevatt (USA); John Hayes (USA); Antonio Rankin (USA); Jeff Reynolds (USA); Alan Nakanishi (USA); Mark Reynolds (USA); Matt Reynolds (USA); Willem Van Waay (USA); Pete Pendleton (USA)	CROCODILE ROCK; Scott Harris (USA); Alexandra Geremia (USA); Tim Harris (USA); Damien Craig (USA); Charlie Furey (USA); Austin Herlihy (USA); Robbie Haines (USA); Kyle Kandt (USA); Scott Easom (USA)	GROOVEDERCI; Deneen Demourkas (USA); John Demourkas (USA); Peter Wuerr (CAN); Ben Beer (ISR); John Rushing (USA); Dee Smith (USA); Kevin Miller (USA); Jamie Gale (NZL); Keith Kilpatrick (USA)
2003 Porto Cervo	ITA1972 - NERONE Antonio Sodo Migliori (ITA); Vasco Vascotto (ITA); Massimo Mezzaroma (ITA); Cesare Bozzetti (ITA); Giulio Scarselli (ITA); Marco Carpinello (ITA); Simon Cardinale (ITA); Maciel Cicchetti (ITA); Massimo Bortoletto (ITA); Alberto Barovier (ITA)	GER931 - NELA Michael Illbruck (GER); John Kostecki (USA); Niels Sodemann (DEN); Jeff Ecklund (USA); Steve Inman (USA); John Harford (USA); Ross Halcrow (NZL); Paul Westlake (AUS); JP Macquet (GER)	USA52104 - BAMBAKOU John Coumantaros (USA); Chris Larson (USA); Scott Holmgren (USA); Theresa Dirocco (USA); Guy Barron (GBR); Justin Heap (GBR); Andrew Nicholson (GBR); Lou Varney (GBR); Nick Larrey (USA); Tim Hardy (GBR)
2004 San Francisco	BARKING MAD; Jim Richardson (USA); Kristin Loewenthal (USA); Linda Lindquist-Bishop (USA); James Baxter (NZL); Tim Lidgard (NZL); Morgan Trubovich (NZL); Steve Inman (USA); Tony Rankin (USA); Terry Hutchinson (USA); Dave Scott (USA)	Nerone; Massimo Mezzaroma (ITA); CREW UNKNOWN	Warpath; Fred Howe (USA); Steve Howe (USA); CREW UNKNOWN
2005 Sydney	AUS6422 - Evolution (7) Richard Perini (AUS); Peter Ryan (AUS); Chris Cook (AUS); Michael Dunstan (AUS); Nick Cleary (AUS); Tristam Eldershaw (AUS); Hamish Pepper (NZL); Darren Jones (AUS); Jason Rowed (AUS); Traks Gordon (AUS)	AUS5077 - Team Shockwave (1) Neville Crichton (AUS); CREW UNKNOWN	ITA13711 - TWT (19) Marco Rodolfi (ITA); CREW UNKNOWN
2006 Newport, Rhode Island	Mascalzone Latino; Vincenzo Onorato (ITA); Daniele Fiaschi (ITA); Monica Rampoldi (ITA); Massimo Paolacci (ITA); Matteo Savelli (ITA); Andriano Figone (ITA); Andrea Ballico (ITA); Davide Scarpe (ITA); Adrian Stead (GBR); Russell Coutts (NZL)	Ichi Ban; Matt Allen (AUS); CREW UNKNOWN	Barking Mad; Jim Richardson (USA); CREW UNKNOWN
2007 Copenhagen	ITA 1 - Mascalzone Latino Vincenzo Onorato (ITA); Matteo Savelli (ITA); Monica Rampoldi (ITA); Andriano Figone (ITA); Daniele Fiaschi (ITA); Marco Cornacchia (ITA); Davide Scarpa (ITA); Andrea Ballico (ITA); Gerry Mitchell (GBR); Adrian Stead (GBR)	SUI 81818 - ALINGHI Ernesto Bertarelli (SUI); Luke Carter (NZL); Andrew Graham (SUI); Kaspar Schadegg (SUI); Francois Mordasini (SUI); Warwick Fleury (NZL); Lorenzo Mazza (ITA); Peter Van Niewenhuyzen (NED); Brad Butterworth (NZL)	USA 50955 - BARKING MAD Jim Richardson (USA); Ben Allen (USA); Sarah Dunn (NZL); Martin Kullman (USA); Tony Rankin (USA); Curtis Florence (USA); Zach Hurst (NZL); James Baxter (NZL); Morgan Trubovich (NZL)
2008 Miami Beach	ITA 1 - Mascalzone Latino Vincenzo Onorato (ITA); Morgan Larson (USA); John Kostecki (USA); Gerry Mitchell (GBR); Andrea Ballico (ITA); Davide Scarpa (ITA); Matteo Savelli (ITA); Tim Burnell (AUS); Roberta De Paoli (ITA); Adriano Figone (ITA); Marco Cornacchia (ITA)	ITA 1805 - Joe Fly Giovanni Maspero (ITA); Francesco Bruni (ITA); Daniene Cassinari (ITA); Alberto Bolzan (ITA); Matteo Auguadro (ITA); Andrea Bussani (ITA); Matteo De Luca (ITA); Federico Insabato (ITA); Francesco Coari (ITA); Andrea Felci (ITA)	MON 40 - Mean Machine Peter De Ridder (NED); Ray Davies (NZL); Dirk De Ridder (NED); Jonathan Swain (RSA); Alan Smith (NZL); Tom Powrie (NZL); Sander Speet (NED); Joost De Graaff (NED); Sander V.D. Borch (NED); Ivan Peute (NED)
2009 Porto Cervo	USA 50955 - BARKING MAD (15) Jim Richardson (USA); Terry Hutchinson (USA); Morgan Trubovich (NZL); James Baxter (NZL); Zach Hurst (NZL); Linda Lindquist-Bishop (USA); Derby Anderson (USA); Martin Kullman (USA); Matt Mcdonough (USA); Curtis Florence (CAN)	ITA 1972 - NERONE (20) Antonio Sodo Migliori (ITA); Massimo Mezzaroma (ITA); Massimo Bortoletto (ITA); Vasco Vascotto (ITA); Victor Marino (ITA); Paolo Bottari (ITA); Cesare Bozzetti (ITA); Giulio Scarselli (ITA); Jacopo Bagnaschi (ITA); Simon Cardinale (ITA)	ITA 1805 - JOE FLY ( 8) Giovanni Maspero (ITA); Francesco Bruni (ITA); Alberto Bolzan (ITA); Andrea Bussani (ITA); Andrea Caracci (ITA); Matteo De Luca (ITA); Francesco Coari (ITA); Andrea Felci (ITA); Matteo Auguadro (ITA); Pierluigi "Pigi" De Felice (ITA)
2010 Casa de Campo	ITA - Nerone Alberto Signorini (ITA); Massimo Mezzaroma (ITA); Massimo Bortoletto (ITA); Vasco Vascotto (ITA); Victor Marino (ITA); Paolo Bottari (ITA); Giulio Scarselli (ITA); Cesare Bozzetti (ITA); Pablo Emilio Torrado (ESP); Marco Carpinello (ITA)	AUS 6422 - Transfusion Guido Belgiorno-Nettis (AUS); Sam Williams (AUS); Tom Slingsby (AUS); Robert Wilmot (AUS); Joshua Chant (AUS); David Chapman (AUS); Peter Sheldrick (AUS); Iain Jensen (AUS); Andy Hudson (AUS); Mitch White (AUS)	USA 50955 - Barking Mad Jim Richardson (USA); Terry Hutchinson (USA); Morgan Trubovich (NZL); James Baxter (NZL); Zach Hurst (NZL); Linda Lindquist-Bishop (USA); Nate Reynolds (USA); Michael Bradley (USA); Matt Mcdonough (USA); Curtis Florence (CAN)
2011 Sydney	AUS 6422 - Transfusion Guido Belgiorno-Nettis (AUS); John Kostecki (USA); Robert Wilmot (AUS); Sam Williams (AUS); Chris Cook (AUS); Peter Sheldrick (AUS); Will Mackenzie (AUS); Andy Hudson (AUS); Mike Leigh (CAN); Mitch White (AUS)	ITA 1972 - Nerone Antonio Sodo Migliori (ITA); Massimo Bortoletto (ITA); Vasco Vascotto (ITA); Victor Marino (ITA); Nicolo Robello (ITA); Paolo Bottari (ITA); Cesate Bozzetti (ITA); Guilio Scarselli (ITA); Pablo Emilio Torrado (ESP); Simon Cardinale (ITA)	USA 50955 - Barking Mad Jim Richardson (USA); Hamish Pepper (NZL); Grant Loretz (NZL); James Baxter (NZL); Zach Hurst (NZL); Linda Lindquist-Bishop (USA); Alexander Clegg (USA); Nate Reynolds (USA); Matt Mcdonough (USA); Curtis Florence (CAN)
2012 Chicago	USA 60002 - Flash Gordon 6 Helmut Jahn (USA); Norman Berge (USA); Matt Cassidy (USA); Michael Evans (USA); David Gerber (USA); Evan Jahn (USA); Bill Hardesty (USA); Joe Londrigan (USA); James Tod Reynolds (USA); Scott Murin (USA)	ITA 29141 - Enfant Terrible Alberto Rossi (ITA); Torben Grael (BRA); Giuseppe Acquafredda (ITA); Jacopo Bagnaschi (ITA); Daniele Cassinari (ITA); Alberto Fantini (ITA); Gaetano Figlia Di Granara (ITA); Paolo Mascino (ITA); Giovanni Palama (ITA); Roberto Strappati (ITA)	AUS 6422 - Transfusion Guido Belgiorno-Nettis (AUS); Iain Jensen (AUS); William Mackenzie (AUS); Nathan Outteridge (AUS); Jordan Reece (AUS); Peter Sheldrick (AUS); Daniel Turner (AUS); Mitch White (AUS); Sam Williams (AUS); Robert Wilmot (AUS)
2013 Newport	ITA 29141 (5) - Enfant Terrible Alberto Rossi (ITA); Jacopo Bagnaschi (ITA); Andrea Caracci (ITA); Giovanni Cassinari (ITA); Alberto Fantini (ITA); Daniele Fiaschi (ITA); Gaetano Figlia Di Granara (ITA); Paolo Mascino (USA); Roberto Strappati (ITA); Vasco Vascotto (ITA)	USA 40076 (10) - Nightshift Kevin McNeil (USA); Rich Bowen (USA); Ian Coleman (USA); Jane Cox (USA); Ted Haaland (USA); Andy Horton (USA); Seth Mininger (USA); Dave Scott (USA); Wilson Stout (USA); Tara Thomas (USA)	USA 50955 (2) - Barking Mad Jim Richardson (USA); James"Skip" Baxter (NZL); Michael Edmonds (NZL); Zach Hurst (NZL); Terry Hutchinson (USA); Steve Inman (USA); Linda Lindquist-Bishop (USA); Matt Mcdonough (USA); Morgan Trubovich (NZL); Jenn Wulff (USA)
2014 San Francisco	USA 60059 (14) - Plenty Alexander Roepers (USA); Terry Hutchinson (USA); James Baxter (NZL); Morgan Trubovich (NZL); Ted Hackney (AUS); Scott Holmgren (USA); Jennifer Wulff (USA); Dimitri Simons (NED); Greg Gendell (USA)	AUS 615 (23) - Estate Master Martin Hill (AUS); Andrew Cambell (AUS); Nicholas Martin (USA); Darren Jones (AUS); Jason Rowed (AUS); James Corrie (AUS); Harry Bethwaite (AUS); Keith Glynn (IRL); Russel Ely (AUS); Marco Carpinello (ITA)	ITA 29141 (5) - Enfant Terrible Alberto Rossi (ITA); Andrea Caracci (ITA); Vasco Vascotto (ITA); Giovanni Cassinari (ITA); Claudio Celon (ITA); Nicolas Dal Ferro (ITA); Carlo Zermini (ITA); Daniele Fiaschi (ITA); Roberto Strappati (ITA); Alberto Fantini (ITA)
2015 Long Beach	USA 7289 - Groovederci John Demourkas (USA); Cesare Bozzetti (ITA); Mike Buckley (USA); Francesco Coari (ITA); Chris Hosking (AUS); Leland Hubble (USA); Zach Hurst (NZL); John Kostecki (USA); Brian Mcmartin (USA)	USA 60059 - Plenty Alexander Roepers (USA); James Baxter (NZL); Greg Gendell (USA); Terry Hutchinson (USA); Mark Langford (AUS); Matt Mcdonough (USA); Fletcher Sims (USA); Morgan Trubovich (NZL); Vann Walke (USA); Jennifer Wulff (USA)	GER 40 - Struntje light Wolfgang Schaefer (GER); Angela Schaefer (GER); Massimo Bortoletto (ITA); Paolo Bottari (ITA); Francesco Bruni (ITA); Pierluigi "Pigi" De Felice (ITA); Lorenzo "Lollo" De Felice (ITA); Matteo De Luca (ITA); Henry Kernot (AUS); Keiran Searle (AUS)
2016 Kirribilli	USA 60059 - Plenty Alexander Roepers (USA); Terry Hutchinson (USA); James Baxter (NZL); Mark Langford (AUS); Fletcher Sims (USA); Morgan Trubovich (NZL); Matt Mcdonough (USA); Emil Wester (DEN); Jennifer Wulff (USA); Greg Gendell (USA)	AUS 6422 - Transfusion Guido Belgiorno-Nettis (AUS); John Kostecki (USA); Mike Leigh (CAN); Bob Wilmot (AUS); Katie Spithill (AUS); Josh Chant (AUS); Chris Cook (AUS); Sam Williams (AUS); Peter Sheldrick (AUS); Mathew Day (AUS); Tim Roberts (AUS); Ryan Wilmot (AUS); Wulf Wilkins (AUS)	GER 40 - Struntje light Wolfgang Schaefer (GER); Hamish Pepper (NZL); Jakopo Bagnaschi (ITA); Massimo Bortoletto (ITA); Paolo Bottari (ITA); Lorenzo "Lollo" De Felice (ITA); Pierluigi "Pigi" De Felice (ITA); Henry Kernot (AUS); Angela Schaefer (GER); Tim Sommerville (GBR)
2017; 8 Boats	USA 60059 - Plenty Alexander Roepers (USA); Terry Hutchinson (USA); James Baxter (NZL); Greg Gendell (USA); Mark Langford (AUS); Dimitri Simons (NED); Fletcher Sims (USA); Morgan Trubovich (NZL); Emil Wester (DEN); Jennifer Wulff (USA)	ITA - Enfant Terrible Alberto Rossi (ITA); Vasco Vascotto (ITA)	USA 60002 - Flash Gordon 6 Evan Jahn (USA); Helmut Jahn (USA); Morgan Reeser (USA)
2018 Chicago; 14 Boats	GER 40 - Struntje light Wolfgang Schaefer (GER); Riccardo Canovaro (ITA); Francesco Coari (ITA); Lorenzo "Lollo" De Felice (ITA); Matteo De Luca (ITA); Victor Marigno (ITA); Massimo Bortoletto (ITA); Iain Percy (GBR); Angela Schaefer (GER); Richard Van Der Weyde (USA)	USA 60059 - Plenty Alexander Roepers (USA); James Baxter (NZL); Chris Cowan (GBR); Greg Gendell (USA); Terry Hutchinson (USA); Mark Langford (AUS); Morgan Trubovich (NZL); Emil Wester (DEN); Jenn Wulff (USA)	USA 60002 - Flash Gordon 6 Evan Jahn (USA); Helmut Jahn (USA); Peter Barnard (USA); Norman Berge (USA); Tom Burnham (USA); Nicholas Ford (USA); David Gerber (USA); Morgan Larson (USA); Joe Londrigan (USA); Scott Murin (USA); Nate Reynolds (USA)
2019 Long Beach; 14 Boats	USA 40076 - Far Niente Drew Freides (USA); Vince Brun (USA); Ben Allen (USA); Eric Doyle (USA); John Hayes (USA); Cameron (Max) Hutcheson (USA); Jake Ladow (USA); Kayla Mccomb (USA); Charlie Smythe (USA)	GER 40 - Struntje light Wolfgang Schaefer (GER); Amedeo Barbara (ITA); Massimo Bortoletto (ITA); Cesare Bozzetti (ITA); Marco Carpinello (ITA); Thomaso Chieffi (ITA); Lorenzo "Lollo" De Felice (ITA); Matteo De Luca (ITA); Chris Fortin (USA); Angela Schaefer (GER)	AUS 007 - Edake (Corinthian) Jaidan Stevens (AUS); Connor Banks (GBR); Jeff Carter (AUS); Lachlan Carter (AUS); Hamish Hardy (AUS); Timothy Lake (AUS); Rosie Lee (AUS); Sean O'Rourke (AUS); Alice Tarnawski (AUS); Evan Walker (AUS)
