= J/24 World Championship =

Sailing regatta for J/24 keelboats

The J/24 World Championship is an annual international sailing regatta for J/24 keelboats, organized by the host club on behalf of the J/24 Class Association and recognized by World Sailing, the sports IOC recognized governing body.

== Events ==
Host clubs of the World Championship

Event			Host			Boats	Sailor					Ref.
Ed.	Date	Year	Host club	City	Country	Boats	No.			Nat.	Cont.	Ref.
1	6-16 Jan	1982	Middle Harbour Yacht Club	Mosman	Australia	40				6+	4+	
2	6-16 Oct	1982	St. Francis Yacht Club	San Francisco, California	United States	62				11+	5+	
3	11-18 Jun	1983	Malmö Segelsällskap	Malmö	Sweden	31				10+	4+	
4	29Sep -6Oct	1984	Parkstone Yacht Club	Poole, Dorset	United Kingdom	51				16+	5+	
5	15-24 Nov	1985		Atsumi Bay	Japan	42				8+	5+	
6	13-19 Sep	1986	Ida Lewis Yacht Club	Newport, Rhode Island	United States	68				14+	5+	
7	14-21 Jun	1987	Comitato Circoli Velici Napoletani	Capri	Italy	57				11+	5+	
8	25Jan -5Feb	1988	Royal Sydney Yacht Squadron	Kirribilli, Sydney	Australia	48				9+	5+	
9	29Jun -6Jul	1989	Kingston Yacht Club	Kingston	Canada	59				10+	4+	
10	23-30 Jul	1990	Royal Irish Yacht Club	Dún Laoghaire	Ireland	62				8+	4+	
11	13-21 Jun	1991	Nautical Club of Paleo Faliro	Athens	Greece	40				13+	5+	
12	22-29 Oct	1992	Eastport Yacht Club	Annapolis, Maryland	United States	81				1+	1+	
13	9-16 Jul	1993	South Caernarvonshire Yacht Club	Abersoch, Wales	United Kingdom	62				13+	5+	
14	12-21 Jan	1994	Royal Brighton Yacht Club	Brighton, Victoria	Australia							
15	17-26 Aug	1995	Rochester Yacht Club	Rochester, New York	United States	73				13+	5+	
16	31May -9Jun	1996	Yacht Club Costa Smeralda	Porto Cervo, Sardinia	Italy	62				17+	5+	
17	13-22 Nov	1997	Yacht Club Argentino	Buenos Aires	Argentina	53				12+	5+	
18	19-24 Jul	1998	St. Francis Yacht Club	San Francisco, California	United States	65				13+	5+	
19	1-8 Oct	1999	Yacht Club Italiano	Genoa	Italy	76				17+	5+	
20	22-29 Sep	2000	Ida Lewis Yacht Club	Newport, Rhode Island	United States	71				2+	2+	
21	23-27 Jul	2001	Kansai Yacht Club	Osaka	Japan	38				1+	1+	
22	18-26 Jul	2002	Portsmouth Olympic Harbour / Sail Kingston	Cork, Kingston	Canada	62				10+	5+	
23	15-23 Aug	2003	Royal Yacht Club Hollandia	Medemblik	Netherlands	66				15+	5+	
24	26Sep -1Oct	2004	Noroton Yacht Club	Darien, Noroton, Connecticut	United States	74				14+	4+	
25	11-26 Sep	2005	National Sailing Academy	Isle of Portland	United Kingdom	55				16+	5+	
26	13-20 Jan	2006	Sandringham Yacht Club	Sandringham, Victoria	Australia	40				9+	5+	
27	5-9 Mar	2007	Vallarta Yacht Club	Nuevi Vallarta	Mexico	70				14+	5+	
28	5-13 Jun	2008	Club Nautico Arzachena	Arzachena	Italy	76				20+	5+	
29	30Apr -8May	2009	Annapolis Yacht Club	Annapolis, Maryland	United States	79	396			18	5	
30	13-20 Aug	2010	Malmö Segelsällskap	Malmö	Sweden	55	280			16	5	
31	11-19 Nov	2011	Yacht Club Argentino	Buenos Aires	Argentina	58	292			10	4	
32	15-23 Sep	2012	Rochester Yacht Club	Rochester, New York	United States	96	432			15	4	
33	22-30 Aug	2013	Howth Yacht Club	Howth, Dublin	Ireland	40				11+	4+	
34	20-26 Sep	2014	Sail Newport / Ida Lewis Yacht Club	Rhode Island	United States	69	344			13	4	
35	31Aug -4Sep	2015	Norddeutscher Regatta Verein	Boltenhagen	Germany	51	260			14	4	
36	19-23 Sep	2016	Wakayama Sailing Club	Wakayama (city)	Japan	41	246			7	4	
37	15-23 Sep	2017	Port Credit Yacht Club	Mississauga	Canada	63				11+	4+	
38	24-31 Aug	2018	Fraglia Vela Riva	Riva del Garda	Italy	89				13+	5+	
39	16-19 Oct	2019	Coral Reef Yacht Club	Miami	United States	79	397			20	5	
N/A	24Sep -2Oct	2020	Parkstone Yacht Club	Poole, Dorset	United Kingdom	CANCELLED COVID-19						
N/A	11-19 Mar	2021		Mendoza	Argentina	CANCELLED COVID-19						
N/A	17-23 Jul	2021	Corpus Christi Yacht Club	Corpus Christi, Texas	United States	CANCELLED COVID-19						
N/A	26Sep -1Oct	2021	Parkstone Yacht Club	Poole, Dorset	United Kingdom	CANCELLED COVID-19						
40	14-22 Jul	2022	Corpus Christi Yacht Club	Corpus Christi, Texas	United States	38				10+	4+	
41	9-16 Sep	2023	Nautical Club of Thessaloniki	Thessaloniki	Greece	35				12+	5+	
42	28Sep -5Oct	2024	Corinthian Yacht Club of Seattle	Seattle, Washington	United States	56	284	216	68	16	5	
43		2025	Plym Yacht Club & Saltash Sailing Club	Plymouth	United Kingdom	50				12+	5+	
44		2026	Sandringham Yacht Club	Sandringham, Victoria	Australia	38	196			9	5	

== Multiple World Champions ==
Based on the medallist data below this includes the 2026 Worlds.

Ranking	Sailor	Gold	Silver	Bronze	Total	No. Entries (1)	Ref.
1	Ken Read (USA)	6	1	2	9	12	
2	Moose McClintock (USA)	6	3	0	9	15	
3	Mauricio Santa Cruz (BRA)	4	3	0	7	12	
4	Gordon Borges (USA)	3	1	0	4	6	
5	Dan Rabin (USA)	3	0	0	3	4	
5	Brad Read (USA)	3	0	0	3	5	
6	Timothy Healy (USA)	2	2	2	6	10	
7	Alfredo Rovere (ARG)	2	1	0	3	4	
7	Alexandre Saldanha (BRA)	2	1	0	3	5	
7	Dave Hughes (USA)	2	1	0	3	3	
7	Daniel Santiago (BRA)	2	1	0	3	5	
7	John Mollicone (USA)	2	1	2	5	7	
7	Vincent Brun (USA)	2	1	0	3	5	
7	Will Welles (USA)	2	1	0	3	11	
15	Andrea Casale (ITA)	2	0	1	3	5	
15	Gustavo Gonzalez (ARG)	2	0	1	3	5	
17	Bill Fortenberry (USA)	2	0	0	2	2	
17	Bradford Dimeo (USA)	2	0	0	2	2	
17	Chris Hufstader (USA)	2	0	0	2	2	
17	Keith Whittemore (USA)	2	0	0	2	11	
17	William Jeffers (USA)	2	0	0	2	4	
17	Jay Miles (USA)	2	0	0	2	4	
17	Larry Klein (USA)	2	0	0	2	3	
17	Nick Turney (USA)	2	0	0	2	6	
17	Paul Grenauer (USA)	2	0	0	2	2	
17	Paolo Boido (ITA)	2	0	0	2	3	
17	Rich Bowen (USA)	2	0	0	2	3	
17	Randall Borges (USA)	2	0	0	2	3	
17	Willem Van Waay (USA)	2	0	0	2	3	
18	Cillian Dickson (IRL)	2	0	0	2	4	
19	Ryan Glynn (IRL)	2	0	0	2	4	
20	Sam O'Byrne (IRL)	2	0	0	2	4	
21	Louis Mulloy (IRL)	2	0	0	2	4	
22	Marcus Ryan (IRL)	2	0	0	2	4	

Note (1) this may be an under estimation as complete crew lists are not always published.

== International Championships ==
In 1979 and 1980 the class held International Championship

== World Championships ==
Year	Gold	Silver	Bronze	Ref.
1981	Mark Bethwaite (AUS); UNKNOWN; UNKNOWN; UNKNOWN	Dave Curtis (USA); B Duncan (USA); UNKNOWN; UNKNOWN	Kurt Miller (USA); UNKNOWN; UNKNOWN; UNKNOWN	
1982	John Kolius (USA); Farley Fontenot (USA); Walter Glasgow (USA); Hank Stuart (USA); Robbie Young (USA)	John Kostecki (USA); UNKNOWN; UNKNOWN; UNKNOWN	Dave Curtis (USA); UNKNOWN; UNKNOWN; UNKNOWN	
1983	Laissez Faire - US 2920 Ed Baird (USA); Larry Klein (USA); Danny Miles (USA); Stephan Pilotti (USA)	Rabbit - US 3700; Bob Johnstone (USA); Stuart Johnstone (USA); Drake Johnstone (USA); Jeff Johnstone (USA)	Akela - US 1673; Richard Hermon-Taylor (USA); UNKNOWN; UNKNOWN; UNKNOWN	
1984	US-2579 - H.J. Dave Curtis (USA) Wally Corwin (USA); Hale Walcoff (USA); Adam Beaudin (USA); Jerry Richards (GBR)	US-4141 - Just Enuff; Ed Baird (USA)	US-96 - Maggie; Ken Read (USA)	
1985	Ken Read (USA) Bill Shore (USA); Todd Berman (USA); Brad Dimeo (USA); Chris Hufstader (USA)	Eddie Warden-Owen (GBR)	Jim Brady (USA)	
1986	Ken Read (USA) Brad Read (USA); Stu Neff (USA); Brad Dimeo (USA); Chris Hufstader (USA)	Chris Hufstader	John Kostecki (USA)	
1987	Francesco de Angelis (ITA) Raimondo Cappa (ITA); Gianpaolo Pavesi (ITA); Rogerto Perrone Capano (ITA); Maurizio Pavesi (ITA)	Ed Baird (USA)	Jim Brady (USA)	
1988	US 4141 Pee Wee John Kostecki (USA); Will Bayliss (USA); Robert Billingham (USA); Peter Young (USA); Carl Ryves (AUS)	US 3379 American Garage; Kevin Mahaney (USA)	US 4351 Rebel Yell; Ken Read (USA)	
1989	Fly Mo J - US 4171 Larry Klein (USA); Ron Rosenberg (USA); Leslie Deardorff (USA); Bill Fortenberry (USA); Brad Dellenbaugh (USA)	American Garage - US 3379 Kevin Mahaney (USA)	Surfer Girl - US 3694 Mark R. Hallman (USA)	
1990	US 4718 - Just More Fun Jim Brady (USA); Steve Inman (USA); Mark Foster (USA); Stephan Kessenich (GER); Andy Hemmings (GBR)	US 4600 - Fuzzy Duck Ken Read (USA); Moose McClintock (USA); UNKNOWN; UNKNOWN	KA 142 - Fruitcakes; Ian Bashford (AUS)	
1991	US 4600 - Maxx Ken Read (USA); Stuart Johnstone (USA); Chuck Brown (USA); Karl Anderson (USA); Bert Forsberg (USA)	US 4718 - Just More Fun Jim Brady (USA); Glenn Darden; UNKNOWN; UNKNOWN	ITA 241 - Johnny Lambs; Fabio Ascoli (ITA) Filippo Di Salle (ITA); Laura D'Alí (ITA); Guido Romano (ITA); Roberto Pasqualetti (ITA); Romolo Becciani (ITA)	
1992	US 2934 - Mookie Ken Read (USA); Josh Belsky (USA); Moose McClintock (USA); Skip Helme (USA); Chuck Brown (USA)	US 4467 - Love Shack; Chris Larson (USA) UNKNOWN; UNKNOWN	US 4922 - Benbow; Jim Brady (USA) UNKNOWN; UNKNOWN	
1993	US 2934 - Mookie; Ken Read (USA); Karl Anderson (USA); Mark Lyons (USA); Moose McClintock (USA); Ed Dawon (GBR)	Northern Exposure; Terry Hutchinson (USA)	Grouse; Georg Bequerizes (ARG)	
1994	Ken Read (USA) UNKNOWN; UNKNOWN; UNKNOWN; UNKNOWN			
1995	US 2181 - Average White Boat Bill Fortenbury (USA); Yumio Dornberg (USA); Simon Smith (USA); Martin Keen (USA); Douglas Weitz (USA)	US 5079; S. Thomas (USA)	US 556; J. Hughes (USA)	
1996	Chris Larson (USA) Vince Brun (USA); Karl Anderson (USA); Paolo Boido (ITA); Jon Rogers (USA)	Sandro Montefusco (ARG)	Guillermo Parada (USA)	
1997	United States; Vince Brun Moose McClintock; Karl Anderson; Jon Rodgers; Pasolo Boido	Vasco Vascotto (ITA) UNKNOWN; UNKNOWN; UNKNOWN	Guillermo Baquerizas (ARG) UNKNOWN; UNKNOWN; UNKNOWN	
1998	Terry Hutchinson (USA) Dave Crocker (USA); Dave Moffet (USA); Matt Beck (USA); Will Jeffers (USA)	Vince Brun (USA) UNKNOWN; UNKNOWN; UNKNOWN	Chris Larson (USA) UNKNOWN; UNKNOWN; UNKNOWN	
1999	ITA-456 - ORNELLA ALL'ATTACCO II Vasco Vascotto (ITA); UNKNOWN; UNKNOWN; UNKNOWN	ITA-428 - ASTER Lorenzo Bressani (ITA); UNKNOWN; UNKNOWN; UNKNOWN	USA-5208 - THE SON OF RABBIT 2 Tim Healy (USA); UNKNOWN; UNKNOWN; UNKNOWN	
2000	Brad Read (USA) Jay Miles (USA); Gordon Borges (USA); Randy Borges (USA); Paul Grenauer (USA)	Bagua; Vasco Vascotto (ITA) UNKNOWN; UNKNOWN; UNKNOWN	Southern California; Chris Snow (USA) UNKNOWN; UNKNOWN; UNKNOWN	
2001	Kazuyuki Hyodo (JPN) Tetsuya Sasaki (JPN); Kazuo Nakajima (JPN); Jiro Okamoto (JPN); Kazuhiko Sofuku (JPN)	Juan Ignacio Grimaldi (ARG) UNKNOWN; UNKNOWN; UNKNOWN	Yutaka Takagi (JPN) UNKNOWN; UNKNOWN; UNKNOWN	
2002	USA 61 - Blind Squirrel Brad Read (USA); Randy Borges (USA); Moose McClintock (USA); Paul Grenaver (USA); Will Jeffers (USA)	Tim Healy (USA) David Crocker (USA); David Moffet (USA); Gordon Borges (USA); Mick Judson (USA)	Geoffrey Moore (USA) John Mollicone (USA); John McCabe (USA); Rob MacMillan (USA); Sam Howell (USA)	
2003	ITA 432 - Kaster Lorenzo Bressani (ITA); UNKNOWN; UNKNOWN; UNKNOWN	USA 5078 - ING Direct Andy Horton (USA); Rudi Wolfs (USA); UNKNOWN; UNKNOWN	ITA 471 - Sailing Planet Gabriele Benussi (ITA); UNKNOWN; UNKNOWN; UNKNOWN	
2004	USA - Salsa Jens Hookanson (USA); PJ Schaeffer (USA); Ralph Kinder (USA); Jock Hayes (USA); Larry Colantuano (USA)	Jeffrey Johnstone (USA)	Max Skelley (USA) Chris Crockett (USA)	
2005	ISV 2329 - Jigalo; Anthony Kotoun (ISV) UNKNOWN; UNKNOWN; UNKNOWN; UNKNOWN	BRA 37 - Bruschetta; Mauricio Oliveira (BRA)	ITA 434 - Fiamma Gialla; Luigi Ravioli (ITA)	
2006	Mauricio Oliveira (BRA) UNKNOWN; UNKNOWN; UNKNOWN	Wataru Sakamoto (JPN) UNKNOWN; UNKNOWN; UNKNOWN	Ian Southworth (GBR) UNKNOWN; UNKNOWN; UNKNOWN	
2007	Mauricio Oliveira (BRA) UNKNOWN; UNKNOWN; UNKNOWN	Mike Ingham (USA) UNKNOWN; UNKNOWN; UNKNOWN	Mark Hillman (USA) UNKNOWN; UNKNOWN; UNKNOWN	
2008	ITA 434 - Fiamma Gialla Andrea Casale (ITA); Fabio Montefusco (ITA); Ernesto Angeletti (ITA); Vittorio Rosso (ITA); Vincenzo Di Capua (ITA)	(GBR 4247) / CAN 4247 - Team Serco Rossi Milev (CAN); Steve Jose (CAN); Jeremy Fowke (GBR); Dr Jon Pegrum (CAN)	GBR 4177 Ian Southworth (GBR); Andy Mclelland (GBR); Max Skelley (USA); Mike Kyte (GBR); Chris McLaughlin (GBR)	
2009	37/ BRA 37 - Bruschetta Mauricio Santa Cruz (BRA); Daniel Santiago (BRA); Alexandre Saldanha (BRA); Paolo Boido (ITA); Alfredo Rovere (ARG)	91/ USA 5362 - National Sailing Hall of Fame Chris Larson (USA); Dave Hughes (USA); Moose McClintock (USA); Steve Frazier (USA); Curtis Florence (USA)	21/ ARG 5194 - Carrera Matias Pereira (ARG); Juan Ignacio Pereira (ARG); Gustavo Gonzalez (ARG); Federico Ambrus (ARG); Guillermo Bellinotto (ARG)	
2010	USA 5235 - 46 Tim Healy (USA); Gordon Borges (USA); Moose McClintock (USA); Dan Rabin (USA); John Mollicone (USA)	GBR 5219 - 18 Ian Southworth (GBR); Andrew McLelland (GBR); David Howlett (GBR); Chris McLaughlin (GBR); J Scott (GBR)	ITA 461 - 37 Andrea Casale (ITA); E Fonda (ITA); F Greggio (ITA); V Piancastelli (ITA); Eugenio Trumpy (ITA)	
2011	ARG 5447 - LUCA VIVE Alejo Rigoni (ARG); Gustavo Gonzalez (ARG); Joaquin Duarte Argerich (ARG); Fernando Gwozdz (ARG); Sergio Armesto (ARG)	PER 4618 - GUERRERO Luis Olcese (PER); Ignacio Arrospide (PER); Joel Raffo (PER); Christian Sas (PER); Joaquin Razetto (PER)	USA 5448 - NONE Mike Ingham (USA); Quinn Schwenker (USA); Mark Penfold (GBR); Nathan Batchelor (GBR); Marianne Schoke (SWE)	
2012	BRA 37 (85) - Bruschetta (Pro) Mauricio Santa Cruz (BRA); Daniel Santiago (BRA); Alex Saldanha (BRA); Sergio Bittencourt (BRA); Alfredo Rovere (BRA)	USA 5235 (22) - 11th Hour Racing (Pro) John Mollicone (USA); Geoff Becker (USA); Timothy Healy (USA); Collin Leon (USA); Gordon Borges (USA)	USA 58 (92) - Bangor Packet (Am) Tony Parker (USA); James Niblock (USA); Geoff Ewenson (USA); Sarah Enwright (USA); Ross Dierdorf (USA)	
2013	USA 5235 - Helly Hansen (28); Tim Healy (USA)John Mollicone (USA); Geoff Becker (USA); Dan Rabin (USA); Gordon Borges (USA)	BRA 37 - Bruschetta (1); Mauricio Santa Cruz (BRA); UNKNOWN; UNKNOWN; UNKNOWN	USA 5432 - Honey Badger (36); Travis Odenbach (USA); UNKNOWN; UNKNOWN; UNKNOWN	
2014	USA 5362 - Cougar Will Welles (USA); Rich Bowen (USA); Luke Lawrence (USA); Dan Rabin (USA); Nick Turney (USA)	BRA 37 - Bruschetta Mauricio Santa Cruz (BRA); Guilherme Hamelmann; Alfredo Rovere; Alexandre Saldanha; Daniel Santiago	USA 5235 - Helly Hansen John Mollicone (USA); Geoff Becker (USA); Timothy Healy (USA); Collin Leon (USA); Gordon Borges (USA)	
2015	GBR 5219 - Il Riccio Ian Southworth (GBR); Andrew McLelland (GBR); David Howlett (GBR); Chris McLaughlin (GBR); Julia Scott (GBR)	USA 5443 - Nautalytics; Mike Ingham (USA); UNKNOWN; UNKNOWN; UNKNOWN; UNKNOWN	USA 5432; Travis Odenbach (USA); UNKNOWN; UNKNOWN; UNKNOWN; UNKNOWN	
2016	GER 5475 - JJOne Daniel Frost (GER); Timo Chorrosch (GER); Felix Leupold (GER); Jeronimo Landauer (GER); Daniel Schwarze (GER)	JPN 5271 - Ichimokusan Demichi Kousuke (JPN); Kenichi Koi (JPN); Kentarou Koi (JPN); Tomohiro Nakayama (JPN); Yasuyuki Ajima (JPN); Hisao Nishikawa (JPN); Hideyuki Takahashi (JPN)	JPN 4085 - FOX Keiji Kondo (JPN); UNKNOWN; UNKNOWN; UNKNOWN; UNKNOWN	
2017	Clear Air Rossi Milev (CAN); Gayle Gray (CAN); Mark Goodyear (CAN); Jon Messenger (CAN); Jeremy Edwards (CAN)	Bangor Packet; Tony Parker (USA); UNKNOWN; UNKNOWN; UNKNOWN; UNKNOWN	Lull; Ariko Murohashi (JPN); UNKNOWN; UNKNOWN; UNKNOWN; UNKNOWN	
2018	USA-5208 - KASTER (9); Will Welles (USA); Nick Turney (USA); Rich Bowen (USA); Giuliano Cattarozzi (ITA); Andrea Casale (ITA)	HUN 37 - J.BOND 037; Tomai Bala'zs (HUN); UNKNOWN; UNKNOWN; UNKNOWN; UNKNOWN	JPN 5185 - Siesta; Nobuyuki IMAI (JPN); UNKNOWN; UNKNOWN; UNKNOWN; UNKNOWN	
2019	USA 5325 - Furio Keith Whittemore (USA); Shelby Milne (USA); Willem Van Waay (USA); Mark Rodgers (USA); Brian Thomas (USA)	CAN 5362 - Clear Air Rossi Milev (CAN); Mark Goodyear (CAN); Victor Diaz De Leon (USA); Vince Somoza (CAN); Jeremy Edwards (CAN)	USA 5476 - Velocidad Christopher Stone (USA); Mike Marshall (USA); Pat O'Connor (USA); Billy Perkins (USA); Brian Kamilar (USA)	
2020	CANCELED COVID-19			
2021	CANCELED COVID-19			
2021	CANCELED COVID-19			
2022	USA 3379 - American Garage Mike Marshall (USA); Dave Hughes (USA); Allan Terhune (USA); Jeffrey Hayden (USA); Rod Favela (VEN)	USA 1954 - Grand Slam 2 Paul Foerster (USA); UNKNOWN; UNKNOWN; UNKNOWN; UNKNOWN	JPN 5185 - Siesta Nobuyuki Imai (JPN); UNKNOWN; UNKNOWN; UNKNOWN; UNKNOWN	
2023	USA 5399 - Furio Keith Whittemore (USA); Mélanie Edwards (USA); Brian Thomas (USA); Marianne Schoke (SWE); Willem Van Waay (USA)	ITA-416 - La superba (26) Ignazio Bonanno (ITA); Francesco Picaro (ITA); Simone Scontrino (ITA); Vano Vincenzo (ITA); Alfredo Branciforte (ITA)	USA-58 - Bangor Packet (30) Anthony Parker (USA); James Niblock (CAN); Zeke Horowitz (USA); Emmet Todd (USA); William Bomar (USA)	
2024	USA-5325 - Honeybadger (28) Travis Odenbach (USA); Monica Morgan (USA); Dave Hughes (USA); Jay Miles (USA); Jeff Sullivan (USA)	USA-5443 - None (43) Michael Ingham (USA); Marianne Schoke (SWE); Max Holzer (USA); Quinn Schwenker (USA); Justin Coplan (USA)	JPN-5450 - GEKKO DIANA (50) Kohei Ichikawa (JPN); Hirohisa Kojima (JPN); Gaku Kawamura (JPN); Shunsuke Mori (JPN); Hiroaki Matsuyama (JPN); Takafumi Miyamoto (JPN)	
2025	IRL 4247 - Headcase (10) Cillian Dickson (IRL); Ryan Glynn (IRL); Sam O’Byrne (IRL); Louis Molloy (IRL); Marcus Ryan (IRL)	USA 58 - Bangor Packet (20) Tony Parker (USA); UNKNOWN; UNKNOWN; UNKNOWN; UNKNOWN	JPN 5450 - Gekko (41) Kohei Ichikawa (JPN); UNKNOWN; UNKNOWN; UNKNOWN; UNKNOWN	
2026	IRL 4247 - Headcase (27) Cillian Dickson (IRL); Ryan Glynn (IRL); Sam O’Byrne (IRL); Louis Molloy (IRL); Marcus Ryan (IRL)	AUS 5086 - Checkmate (8) Sean Kirkjian (AUS); Phillip Cooke (AUS); Shane Guanaria (AUS); William Hough (AUS); Tony Reynolds (AUS)	AUS 4427 - Haywire (15) Ian Walker (AUS); Kylie Balharrie (AUS); Aaron Cole (AUS); Richard Taylor (AUS); Dean Van Teylingen (AUS)	
