= Pamela Healy =

American sailor (born 1963)

Personal information
- Full name: Pamela Katherine Healy
- Nationality: American
- Born: June 24, 1963 (age 63) San Francisco, California, U.S.
- Height: 5 ft 9 in (175 cm)
- Spouse: Craig Healy

Sailing career
- Sport: Sailing
- Club: Richmond Yacht Club; St. Francis Yacht Club
- Class: 470
Medal record
Women's sailing
Representing the United States
Olympic Games
Bronze medal – third place	1992 Barcelona	470 class
470 World Championships
Gold medal – first place	1991 Brisbane	470 class

Pamela Katherine Healy (born June 24, 1963, in San Francisco, California) is a retired female sailor from the United States, who won a bronze medal at the 1992 Summer Olympics in Barcelona, Spain. She did so in the 470 class, alongside Jennifer Isler.

Pam grew up sailing in the SF Bay Area. Her parents, John and Mary Poletti, sailed in the large (at the time) Cal-20 fleet. Pam learned to sail in her yellow El Toro named "Woodstock" with the likes of John Kostecki at the Richmond Yacht Club where she met her husband Craig Healy. Pam joined the St. Francis Yacht Club as a Junior Member in 1983.

Pam resides in Marin County with her husband, Craig, and their three children.
