= Stuart Pollard =

Australian Sailor

Sailing career
- Sport: Sailing
Medal record
Sailing
Representing Australia
World Championships
Gold medal – first place	2011 Palma de Mallorca, Spain	Melges 32
Offshore Team Racing World Champs
Bronze medal – third place	2009 Porto Cervo, Italy	Farr 40

Stuart Pollard is an Australian sailor and property developer at CHAPTER+CO. Stuart has won National, European and World Sailing Championships.

Stuart won the 2011 Melges 32 World Championships in Palma De Mallorca, Spain.

Stuart participated in the Extreme Sailing Series as Tactician on Team Alinghi. Alinghi won the 2014 Extreme Sailing Series beating the competition which included Americas Cup Teams, Emirates Team New Zealand, Ben Ainslie Racing and Groupama Team France.

Stuart won the 2017 Roles Sydney to Hobart Yacht Race on board the 100 foot 'Comanche'. Comanche established a new course record of 1 day, 9 hours, 15 minutes and 24 seconds for the tough 629 nauticle mile race. Stuart was one of the bowman.

Stuart placed 14th in the 2016 International Triathlon Union Cross Triathlon World Championships.

In conjunction with his sailing, Stuart is a director of CHAPTER+CO, a property investment and development company in his home town of Sydney, Australia.
