= Peter Rowley (disambiguation) =

Peter Rowley is a New Zealand comic actor.

Peter or Pete Rowley may also refer to:

- Peter Rowley, namesake of Rowleys Bay, Wisconsin
- Pete Rowley (sailor) in 2006 Enterprise World Championship

== See also ==
- Peter Rowley-Conwy (born 1951), British archaeologist
