= Vincenzo Onorato =

Italian ship-owner and sailing team head

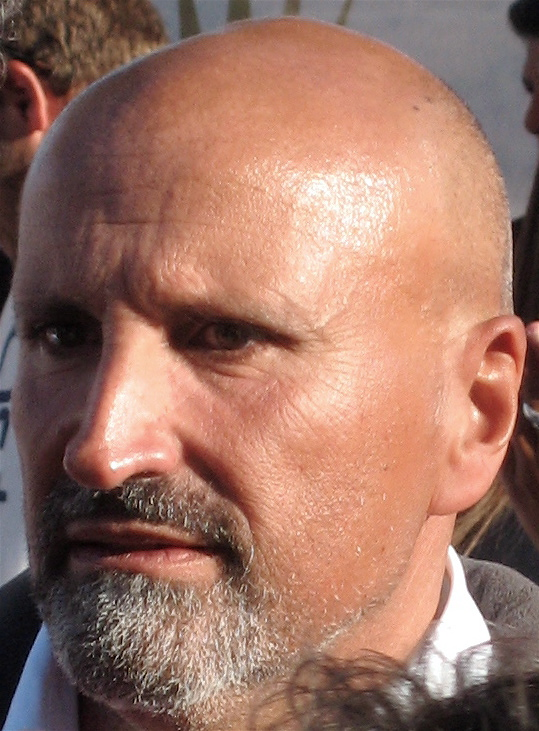
- Onorato in 2006
- Born: 15 May 1957 (age 68); Naples, Italy
- Occupation: Amateur Sailor

Vincenzo Onorato (born 15 May 1957) is an Italian ship-owner and the head of the Mascalzone Latino Sailing Team which is in the Farr 40 circuit.

== Sailing ==
Onorato competed in the Melges 32, Mumm 36, Farr 30, Farr 40 and X-41 World Championships as helmsman.

Vincenzo was also actively involved as figurehead of Mascalzone Latino America's Cup campaign at the 2003 and 2007 Louis Vuitton Cups.

== Business ==
In 2015, Vincenzo Onorato acquired 100% of the Naples-based ferry company Tirrenia – Compagnia italiana di navigazione, which became a part of the Onorato Armatori group. Vincenzo Onorato also owns the ferry company Moby Lines and Toremar. His ferry group is the world's leader in beds capacity, and the European leader in passengers capacity (47 ships, 41,000 departures). He claims his company hires only Italian seafarers, and lobbies against competitors using non-EU labor to drive prices down. He argues that hiring an Italian-only staff costs his group 25 to 30 million euros more every year. In May 2019, he announced the acquisition of the cargo ship Maria Grazia Onorato with a message on the side that says "Onorato for Italian seafarers" (pun, Onorato per i marittimi italiani)
