= John Kostecki =

American sailor

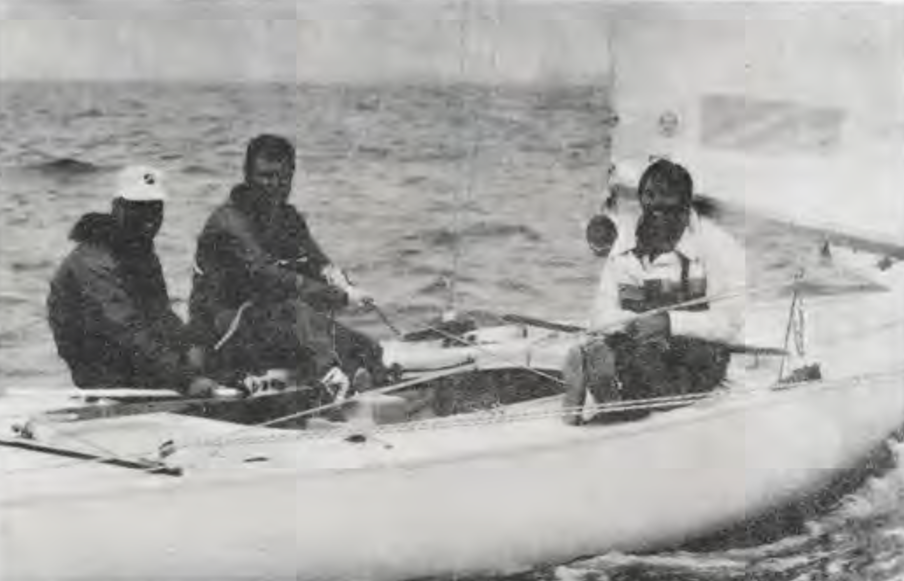

Personal information
- Full name: John Paul Kostecki
- Born: June 7, 1964 (age 62) Pittsburgh, Pennsylvania, U.S.

Sailing career
- Sport: Sailing
- Classes: Soling, 6 Metre, RC44
Medal record
Men's sailing
Representing the United States
Olympic Games
Silver medal – second place	1988 Seoul	Soling class

John Paul Kostecki (born July 7, 1964) is an American competitive sailor of Polish descent. He was born in Pittsburgh, Pennsylvania. He started his sailing career in the San Francisco Bay, California.

He attended Novato High School and graduated in 1982.

== Events ==
=== World Championships ===
Kostecki won a number of world champion titles in different sailing classes.

Title No.	Role	Boat	Boat Name	Title	Location	Ref
1				1982 Sunfish World Championship		
2				1986 Soling World Championship		
3				1988 J/24 World Championship		
4				1988 Soling Class World Championship		
5				1989 6 Meter World Cup		
6				1996 Mumm 36 World Champion		
7				1997 Mumm 36 World Champion		
8				1998 Mumm 36 World Champion		
9				1998 Farr 40 World Championship		
10				2008 Farr 40 World Championship		
11				2010 RC44 World Championship		
12				2011 Farr 40 World Championship		
13			Ngoni	2014 Soto 40 World Champion		
14			Catapult	2016 J/70 World Championship		
15			Illbruck	2016 Melges 20 World Championship		
16	Tactician		Platoon	2017 TP52 World Championship		
17	Helm			2024 Star World Championship		

=== Olympics ===
At the 1988 Summer Olympics in Busan, South Korea, he finished in 2nd place in the Soling class along with his partners William Baylis and Robert Billingham.

=== Volvo Ocean Race ===
He also sailed the Whitbread Round the World Race in 1997/1998.

In the 2001–02 Volvo Ocean Race he led Illbruck Challenge that was based in Leverkusen to victory in one of the toughest sailing races. Of notable interest was that Illbruck set the world 24 hours speed record for monohulls. The record of 484 nautical miles was completed at 20:02 on April 30 during Leg 7 of the Volvo Ocean Race and was confirmed by the World Sailing Speed Record Council. This sparked a sailing boom in Germany that led to thousands of sailing fans and Illbruck supporters awaiting Kostecki and his crew finishing their last leg from Gothenburg to Kiel.

He did the 2005–06 Volvo Ocean Race with Ericsson. He was also designated skipper for Ericsson’s in the next Race (2008/2009) but resigned from his position in August 2007 for family reasons

=== America's Cup ===
He sailed with America^{3} at the 1992 America's Cup.

After a short employment with the BMW Oracle America’s Cup Team in the early 2000s he left for the 2005 VOE.

In 2008, the then three times America’s Cup winner Russell Coutts, who had just recently been appointed CEO of Larry Ellison's America’s Cup Team BMW Oracle Racing, hired Kostecki for his afterguard. The next America’s cup match took place between the defender, the Swiss team Alinghi, and BMW Oracle, in Valencia (Spain) in February 2010. With Kostecki as tactician, the American team won both races against the defender and thus brought back the oldest trophy in sports history to the United States after 15 years.

=== Other ===
In 1997, he won the One Design 48 Championship, and the Malaysia Challenge Grand Prix. Kostecki became very popular in Europe as skipper and helmsman of the German yachts all called "Pinta" owned by the Illibruck family.

== Awards ==
In 1988, he was then named United States Rolex Yachtsman of the Year

In 2002, Kostecki was named United States Rolex Yachtsman of the Year for the second time

In 2002 he was shortlisted for the World Sailing – World Sailor of the Year Awards.

2012 US Sailing Hall of Fame Inductee
