= Matthew Percy =

Olympic sailor from Australia

Personal information
- Nickname: Tiny
- Nationality: Australia
- Born: 1 October 1962 (age 63) Sydney
- Height: 198 cm (6 ft 6 in)
- Weight: 125 kg (276 lb)

Sport

Sailing career
- Class: Soling
- Club: SYC
- Updated on 28 February 2020

Matthew Percy (born 1 October 1962) is a sailor from Queensland Australia. Percy represented Australia in the America's Cup defence team with Alan Bond in Perth Australia in 1987. His position on the yacht was the sewer man up on the foredeck, packing and hoisting sails. Most of Percy's time was spent on Australia IV. Percy later represented Australia at the 1988 Summer Olympics in Busan, South Korea as crew member in the Soling. With helmsman Bob Wilmot and fellow crew member Glenn Read they took the 14th place.

Percy took part in the Sydney-Hobart race in 2007 and 2011, sailing his boat 'Alacrity'.
