= Glenn Read =

Olympic sailor from Australia

Personal information
- Nationality: Australia
- Born: 7 April 1945 (age 80)

Sport

Sailing career
- Class: Soling
- Updated on 28 February 2020

Glenn Read (born 7 April 1945) is a sailor from Australia. who represented his country at the 1988 Summer Olympics in Busan, South Korea as crew member in the Soling. With helmsman Bob Wilmot and fellow crew members Matthew Percy they took the 14th place.
