= David Hughes (sailor) =

American sailor

David "Dave" Hughes (born January 22, 1978, in Ithaca, New York) is a US Olympian, multi-time world and national champion, and professional sailor. Hughes was a member of the 2020(21), 2016, and 2012 US Olympic Teams. He is best known for his accomplishments on the Olympic sailing circuit, both as an athlete and coach. He lives in Miami, Florida. In 2005, he joined North Sails to lead its North American One Design division.

== Sailing career ==
=== Olympic classes ===
He made his first mark on the Olympic scene with a win at the 2005 Kiel Week Regatta with Michael Anderson-Mitterling. David is a 4x National champion and 6x North American champion in the 470 class. He has won 5x World Cup Gold Medals and 3x European Championship medals (2018, 2016, 2015). Notable highlights include recent Gold Medals at the 2017, 2016, and 2013 Sailing World Cup Miami, 2015 Europeans Championships, 2015 Sailing World Cup Weymouth, as well as multiple medals in other Olympic

=== World Championship ===
He has also competed outside the olympic classes winning the 2016 Melges 24 World Championship, 2017 Etchells World Championship, 2022 J/24 World Championship, 2022 J/70 World Championship and 6 Metre World Cup.

=== Olympic sailing ===
Hughes was a US Olympic Team coach at the 2012 London Olympics, coaching Erik Storck and Trevor Moore in the 49er class. After the 2012 Olympics, Hughes partnered with two-time Olympian Stuart McNay. The two qualified together for the 2016 and 2020 Olympic Games, representing the US in the Men's 470 two-person discipline. Hughes has five times been shortlisted for US Yachtsman of the Year. He is a dual citizen of the US and France. He holds both a bachelor's and a master's degree; he was a US Senate, US House, and White House West Wing intern during the years 1996-1998.

=== America's Cup ===
In 2018, Hughes was signed by the New York Yacht Club, "American Magic" team challenging for the 2021 America's Cup.
