= ISAF Offshore Team Racing World Championship =

Sailing competition

The ISAF Offshore Team World Championship are bi-annually since 2004 held by the Yacht Club Costa Smeralda in Sardinia Italy and are run in cooperation with the Offshore Racing Congress.

Event	2004	2006	2008	2010
Melges 32	-	-	-	X
Farr 40	X	X	X	X
Swan 45	X	X	X	-
TP 52	-	X	X	-
IMS	X	-	-	-
