= Melges 20 World Championship =

World Championship in the Melges 20 Keelboat

The Melges 20 World Championship is an annual international sailing regatta for Melges 20 keelboats, organized by the host club on behalf of the International Melges 20 Class Association and recognized by World Sailing, the sports IOC recognized governing body.

== Events ==
Host cities of the Melges 20 World Championship
Host cities of the Melges 20 World Championship

Dates			Host			No. Boats	Sailors					Ref.
Ed.	Date	Year	Host club	Location	Nat.	No. Boats	No.			Nat.	Cont	Ref.
1	10-14 Oct.	2012	Ocean Reef Club	Key Largo	United States	52	161			15	5	
2	25-30 Aug.	2014	Fraglia della Vela Riva	Riva del Garda	Italy	57	188			16	4	
3	29 Sept. to 3 Oct.	2015	San Francisco Yacht Club	Tiburon	United States	39	124			14	5	
4	25-28 Aug.	2016	Club Nautico Scarlino	Scarlino	Italy	56	186			19	6	
5	4-7 Oct	2017	New York Yacht Club: Harbour Court	Newport, Rhode Island	United States	38	122			12	4	
6	10-13 Oct.	2018	Yacht Club Cagliari	Cagliari	Italy	36	133			16	5	
7	4-7 April	2019	Coconut Grove Sailing Club	Miami	United States	22						
8	7-10 Oct.	2020	Circolo Nautico della Vela – CNVA	Cala Galera	Italy	15				4+	1+	
9	8-12 Dec.	2021	Coconut Grove Sailing Club	Miami	United States	18	64	53	11	12	4	
10	21-24 Sept.	2022	Marina di Puntaldia	Olbia	Italy	10	36	30	6	6	2	
11	30 Nov. to 04 Dec.	2023	Coconut Grove Sailing Club	Miami	United States	14	47	38	9	10	5	

== Multiple World Champions ==
Compiled from the data below the table includes up to and including 2023.

Ranking	Sailor	Gold	Silver	Bronze	Total	No. Entries*	Ref.
1	Federico Michetti (ITA)	2	2	0	4	8	
2	Charlie Smythe (USA)	2	1	0	3	7	
2	Morgan Reeser (USA)	2	1	0	3	6	
2	Drew Freides (USA)	2	1	0	3	5	
2	Filippo Pacinotti (ITA)	2	1	0	3	4	
6	Jeff Reynolds (USA)	2	0	1	3	6	
6	John Kilroy (USA)	2	0	1	3	4	
8	Daniel Thielman (USA)	2	0	0	2	6	
8	Bill Hardesty (USA)	2	0	0	2	4	
8	Alec Anderson (IVB)	2	0	0	2	3	
8	Rayleen Thielman (USA)	2	0	0	2	3	

- full results are not available for two years so this may be an underestimation

== Results ==
Year	Gold	Silver	Bronze	Ref.
2013 (United States); 52 Boats	USA 1315 - Ninkasi John Taylor (USA); Bill Hardesty (USA); Joey Mello (USA)	USA 176 - Cajun Underwriting Marcus Eagan (USA); Andrew Eagan (USA); Marc Eagan (USA)	USA 3 - Lucky Dog / Gill Race Team Travis Weisleder (USA); Scott Nixon (USA); John Bowden (USA)	
2014 (Italy) Garda; 57 Boats	USA 13131 - Samba Pa Ti (313) John Kilroy (USA); Paul Goodison (GBR); Jeff Reynolds (USA)	ITA 23 - Mascalzone Latino (23) Achille Onorato (ITA); Malcolm Page (AUS); Stefano CIAMPALINI (ITA)	MON 333 - Monaco Racing Fleet (333) Guido Miani (ITA); Gabriele Benussi (ITA); Massimo Gherarducci (ITA)	
2015 (United States) Tiburon	USA 13131 - Samba Pa Ti John Kilroy (USA); Bill Hardesty (USA); Jeff Reynolds (USA)	BRA 245 - Portobello Cesar Gomes Neto (BRA); Xabier Fernandez (ESP); Andre Fonseca (BRA)	USA 311 - WildMan Liam Kilroy (USA); Steve Hunt (USA); Stephanie Roble (USA); Erik Shampain (USA)	
2016 (Italy) Scarlino	USA 4014 - Pinta Michael Illbruck (GER); John Kostecki (USA); Federico Michetti (ITA)	USA 236 - PACIFIC YANKEE Drew Freides (USA); Morgan Reeser (USA); Charlie Smythe (USA)	POL 264 - MAG TINY Krzysztof Krempec (POL); Tomislav Basic (CRO); Ivan Ivankovic (CRO)	
2017 (United States) Newport; 38 Boats	USA 300 - Pacific Yankee Drew Freides (USA); Morgan Reeser (USA); Charlie Smythe (USA)	RUS 309 - Nika Vladimir Prosikhin (RUS); Sara Callahan; Michele Ivaldi (ITA); Giorgio Tortarolo (ITA)	USA 13131 - Samba Pa Ti John Kilroy (USA); Paul Goodison (GBR); Jeff Reynolds (USA)	
2018 (Italy) Cagliari; 36 Boats	USA 300 - PACIFIC YANKEE Drew Freides (USA); Morgan Reeser (USA); Charlie Smythe (USA)	ITA 667 - BRONTOLO Filippo Pacinotti (ITA); Federico Michetti (ITA); Manuel Weiller Vidal (ESP); Silvia Morini	RUS 296 - Russian Bogatyrs Igor Rytov (RUS); Anton Sergeev (RUS); Kostantin Besputin (RUS)	
2019 (United States) Miami; 22 Boats	ITA 65 - STIG Alessandro Rombelli (ITA); Francesco Bruni (ITA); Giorgio Tortarolo (ITA); Tea Faoro	USA 88 - Heartbreaker Robert Hughes (USA); Manuel Weiller Vidal (ESP); Federico Michetti (ITA)	RUS 898 - Russian Bogatyrs Igor Rytov (RUS); Anton Sergeev (RUS); Kostantin Besputin (RUS)	
2021 (Italy) Cala Galera; 15 Boats	ITA 667 BRONTOLO Filippo Pacinotti (ITA); UNKNOWN; UNKNOWN	RUS 296 RUSSIAN BOGATYRS Igor Rytov (RUS); UNKNOWN; UNKNOWN	TA 50 FREMITO D'ARJA Dario Levi (ITA); UNKNOWN; UNKNOWN	
2021 (United States) Miami; 18 Boats	Kuai; Alec Anderson (USA) Lucas Calabrese (ARG); Daniel Thielman (USA); Rayleen Thielman (USA)	Russian Bogatyrs Igor Rytov (RUS); Michele Ivaldi (ITA); Anton Sergeev (RUS)	Honeybadger Ian Liberty (USA); Michael Menninger (USA); Katy Nastro (USA); Harry Roepers (USA)	
2022 (Italy) Olbia; 10 Boats	ITA 667 - BRONTOLO Filippo Pacinotti (ITA); Taylor Canfield (ISV); Federico Michetti (ITA); Irene Saderini (ITA)	MON 304 - NIKA Vladimir Prosikhin (RUS); Lorenzo De Felice (ESP); Chicca Salva (ESP); Manuel Weiller Vidal (ESP)	ITA 50 - FREMITO D'ARJA Dario Levi (ITA); Stefano Cherin (ITA); Jas Farneti (ITA); Fausto Surini (ITA)	
2023 - 14 Boats	USA 7676 - Kuai; Daniel Thielman (USA); Victor Diaz (VEN); Alec Anderson (IVB); Rayleen Thielman (USA)	USA 226 - Gamecock; Peter Mcclennen (USA); Jeremy Wilmot (AUS); Michael Marshall (USA)	MON 309 - Nika; Vladimir Prosikhin (RUS); Manuel Weiller (ESP); Giorgio Tortarolo (ITA); Federica Salvà (ITA)	
