= Bob Wilmot =

Olympic sailor from Australia

Personal information
- Full name: Robert Wilmot
- Nationality: Australia
- Born: 7 June 1962 (age 64) Sydney
- Height: 1.80 m (5.9 ft)

Sailing career
- Sport: Sailing
- Class: Soling
- Updated on 28 February 2020

Bob Wilmot (born 20 June 1958) is a sailor from Sydney, Australia, who represented his country at the 1988 Summer Olympics in Busan, South Korea as helmsman in the Soling. With crew members Glenn Read and Matthew Percy they took the 14th place.
