= Farr 45 =

Categorization of sailboats

Development
- Designer: Bruce Farr
- Year: 1996

Boat
- Draft: 3.00 m (9.84 ft)

Hull
- LOA: 13.87 m (45.5 ft)
- LWL: 12.22 m (40.1 ft)
- Beam: 4.19 m (13.7 ft)

Farr 45 (formerly Corel 45) is a 13.87-metre (45.5 ft) sailboat class designed by Bruce Farr.
