= Chris Cook (sailor) =

Canadian sailor

Christopher Cook (born October 1, 1974) is a Canadian sailor from Toronto, Ontario who competes in the Finn class.

In 2005, Cook won a bronze medal at the Gold Cup. At the 2008 Summer Olympics, he finished in fifth place.
