= Lorenzo Bressani =

Italian sailor

- Born: 28 June 1973 (age 52); Trieste, Italy
- Occupation: Professional Sailor

Lorenzo Bressani (born 28 June 1973) is an Italian sailor.

In 2010 and 2011, following back to back Melges 24 and Melges 32 World Championship wins, he was shortlisted by the International Sailing Federation for the ISAF World Sailor of the Year Awards.
