= Enterprise World Championship =

Series of sailing championships

The Enterprise World Championship is an international sailing regatta for the Enterprise (dinghy) class, organized by the host club on behalf of the International Enterprise Class Association and recognized by World Sailing, the sports IOC recognized governing body.

== Medalists ==
year	Gold	Silver	Bronze	Ref.
1970 Weymouth	Great Britain; Roger Hance; Trevor Palmer			
1971 Harwich	Great Britain; Paul McNamara; Michael McNamara	Great Britain; Paul Martin; Albert Harry	Great Britain; Michael Rimmer; Bob Suggitt	
1972 Helensburgh	Great Britain; Roger Hance; Trevor Palmer	Great Britain; Michael Rimmer; Mike Holmes		
1973 Vancouver	Canada; Peter Byrne; Jane Byrne	Canada; Dick Dexter Joan Dexter	Canada; Rich Helmer Tom Schnackenberg	
1974 Tynemouth	Great Britain; Philip Crebbin; Derek Clarke			
1975 Waterford	Great Britain; Mike Holmes; Richard Janulewicz			
1976; Weymouth	Great Britain; S. Robertson; I. Gardiner	Great Britain; John Robertson; Colin Gardiner	Great Britain; Stuart Pearson; Jane Kiddle	
1978; Paignton	Great Britain; Lawrie Smith; Andy Barker	Pakistan; Byram D Avari; Ali Khan		
1979; Sligo	Great Britain; Mike Holmes; Andrew Fletcher			
1985; Hong Kong	Great Britain; Ian Pinnell & Andrew Holdsworth	Great Britain; Alan Gillard & Graham Mactham	Great Britain; Vince Horey & Adrian Edwards	
2000; Mounts Bay; United Kingdom	GBR; Ian Pinnell; Ben Field	GBR; Richard Estaugh (GBR); Peter Rowley (GBR)	GBR; Ian Fisher; Simon Cook	
2002; Bogmalo; Goa	GBR 23006; Richard Estaugh (GBR); Peter J Rowley (GBR)	IRL 22932; Shane McCarthy; Simon Cook	IND 16; NARESH YADAV; GIRDHARILAL YADAV	
2004; Cork; Ireland	GBR 22975; Nick Craig (GBR); Sheena Craig (GBR)	GBR 22917; Jeff Dyer (GBR); Simon Cook (GBR)	IND 52; Aashim Mongia (IND); Amit Arvind (IND)	
2005/06; Sri Lanka	Richard Estaugh (GBR); Peter J Rowley (GBR)	Pakistan; Mamoon Sadiq; A Hameed Baloch	Pakistan; Zahid Rauf; Rana M Waqas Anwar	
2006; Looe; United Kingdom	GBR 23170; Nick Craig (GBR); Toby Lewis (GBR)	GBR 23144; Ian Southworth (GBR); Jackie Barker (GBR)	GBR 23196; Richard Estaugh (GBR); Pete Rowley (GBR)	
2007; Dun Laoghaire; Ireland	GBR 23170; Nick Craig (GBR); Fiona Clark (GBR)	GBR 23089; Jonathan Woodward (GBR); Alex Halliwell (GBR)	IND 5 Naresh Kumar Yadav (IND); C Murugan (IND)	
