= Sail Newport =

Sailing center in Rhode Island

- Burgee
- Full name: Sail Newport Sailing Center
- Founded: 1983
- Location: 72 Fort Adams Drive, Newport, Rhode Island United States
- Website: www.sailnewport.org

Sail Newport is a public sailing center inside Fort Adams State Park in Newport, Rhode Island.

== History ==
Sail Newport was founded in 1983 after the loss of the America's Cup. The organization's mission is to promote and operate affordable public sailing instruction, rental programs and to create opportunities to attract new sailors to the sport.

Sail Newport is Rhode Island's premier public sailing center. It offers sailing lessons to all ages, in addition to boat storage and numerous annual regattas. Special events have included the America's Cup World Series in 2012 and the Volvo Ocean Race in 2015 and 2018. They will be represented by American Racing Challenger Team USA in the 2027 America's Cup.
