= RC44 =

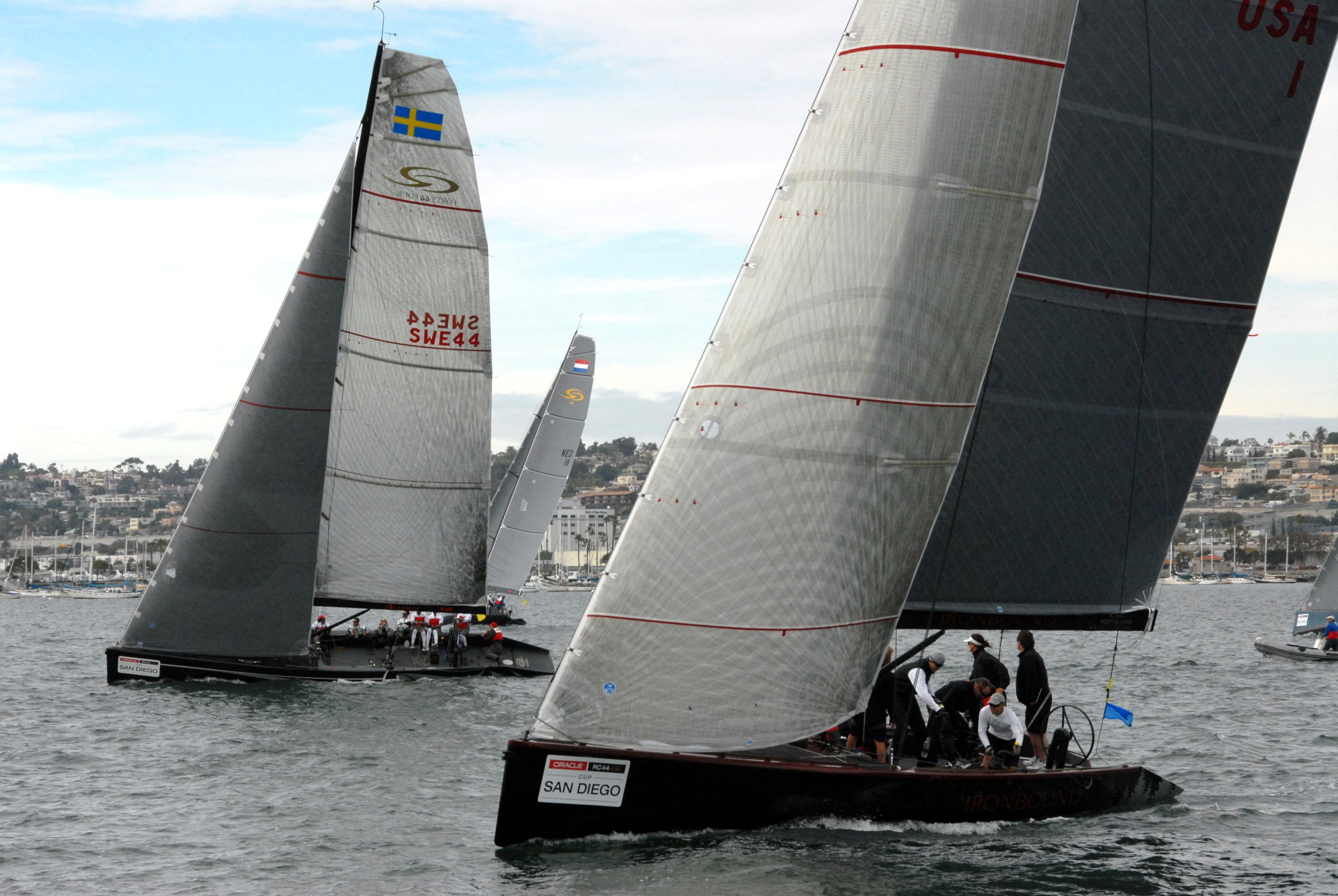
- RC44 racing at San Diego

Development
- Designer: Russell Coutts & Andrej Justin
- Year: 2007
- Builder: Pauger Yachts

The RC44 sailboat was designed by Russell Coutts and with the assistance of naval architect Andrej Justin the boat is built by Pauger Carbon Composite / Pauger Yachts and first launched in 2007. The class is recognised by the International Sailing Federation in November 2009 and held it first World Championships in 2010.

The boat was conceived in 2007.

== Boat dimensions ==
- LOA: 13,35 m
- B max: 2,75 m
- Draft: 2,90 m
- Displacement: 3460 kg
- Keel: 2010 kg
- Crew: 450 kg

== Events ==
=== World Tour ===
In addition the class holds a tour taking in a number of the key sailing locations in North America, Europe and the Middle East.
