= St. Francis Yacht Club =

Sailing club in San Francisco, California

- Burgee
- Founded: 1927
- Location: 99 Yacht Road, San Francisco, California & Tinsley Island, Stockton, California United States
- Website: www.stfyc.com

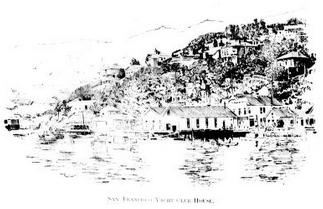
San Francisco Yacht Club House ca. 1894

The St. Francis Yacht Club is a private sailing club located in San Francisco.

== History ==
Founded in 1927, the Saint Francis Yacht Club (StFYC) was formed when some of the members of the San Francisco Yacht Club decided to move their clubhouse from Sausalito to Belvedere, California to escape the rapidly growing commercial activity of Sausalito. This was prior to the construction of the Golden Gate Bridge, and travel to Marin County from San Francisco was entirely by water. A group of San Francisco Yacht Club members wished to relocate the club to the City of San Francisco to make it easier to access the Clubhouse. No agreement between the two factions was reached and the group favoring a San Francisco location split off to found StFYC. StFYC has become generally considered to be the most prestigious yacht club in the western United States. Membership in the club is by invitation only.

== San Francisco Clubhouse ==
StFYC hired the famous San Francisco architect Willis Polk to design their clubhouse which was then built on land leased from San Francisco by the club on the jetty off of Crissy Field in the Marina District, San Francisco, on landfill created for the 1915 Panama Pacific International Exposition. Polk died before the blueprints could be completed but his office finished them. The Mediterranean Revival-style building enjoys views from the Bridge to Alcatraz Island and beyond.

On December 21, 1976, the original Clubhouse caught fire during a party. One member was killed and seven badly injured. The membership rallied to rebuild the western half of the Clubhouse which had been destroyed in the fire. On October 17, 1989, the Loma Prieta earthquake damaged the Clubhouse and extensive foundation repairs were required. Once again, the membership rallied to repair the beloved clubhouse.

With some of the best water views in San Francisco, the StFYC Clubhouse has three eating venues: A formal main dining room on the second story, the Clippership bar also on the second story, and the Grill Room a snug gathering place on the ground . In response to the COVID-19 pandemic, StFYC has added two outdoor eating areas: The Race Deck, located on the rooftop of the Clubhouse, and the Courtyard, centrally located and protected from the strong winds of San Francisco Bay.

== Sailboat racing at StFYC ==
StFYC assembled a syndicate to compete for the 2000 Louis Vuitton Cup, with their entry, AmericaOne. Their entry was defeated in the semifinals by Italy's Prada.

StFYC sponsors numerous regattas and races for sailboats of all sizes. These include the Rolex Big Boat Series for large yachts of all kinds, Kleinman/Swiftsure Regatta, Elvstrom/Zellerbach regatta, Jessica Cup for classic yachts, and numerous one-design events. An annual highlight is the Opti Heavy Weather regatta sailed on the windy north shore of the City of San Francisco, right in front of the StFYC Clubhouse. Youngsters test their skill and stamina in this cherished event.

StFYC has hosted numerous World, Continental, and National Championships including the 5O5, Farr-40, Melges-24, Farr-30, Express-27, Express-37, and many others.

== Flagships ==
The St. Francis has had many flagships over the years including some historic craft.

- USS Zaca (IX-73)

== Tinsley Island outstation ==
StFYC maintains an outstation on Tinsley Island a few miles west of Stockton, California in the Sacramento–San Joaquin River Delta. Every year, the members of StFYC and their guests visit Tinsley Island for cruises, events, and sailing classes. Heavily used during the summer months, the outstation is open and staffed year-round. Many members cherish the peace and slower pace of winter months on Tinsley Island.

The facilities include dockage for boats, swimming, accommodations in a lighthouse built in the late 1800s and other buildings, small boats to sail and paddle, and various sporting events.

== Reciprocity ==
The St. Francis Yacht Club warmly welcomes sailors from all over the world.

Like many yacht clubs on the West Coast, St.FYC is a member of the Pacific Inter-Club Yacht Association, which provides reciprocal privileges between members of hundreds of other yacht clubs. St.FYC also shares reciprocity with clubs around the world including: The New York Yacht Club, Outrigger Canoe Club, Royal Prince Alfred Yacht Club, Royal Thames Yacht Club, Société Nautique de Genève, Yacht Club de Monaco and Norddeutscher Regatta Verein.

If you wish to visit the St. Francis Yacht Club, visit their StFYC Home Page.

== Notable members ==
The club has had many notable members in its history

- Tom Blackaller, world-champion yachtsman and America's Cup helmsman, Sailing Hall of Fame member
- Paul Cayard, Olympian and America's Cup competitor, Sailing Hall of Fame member
- John Kostecki, Olympian and America's Cup competitor, Sailing Hall of Fame member
- Gary Jobson, sailing author and America's Cup tactician, Sailing Hall of Fame member
- Pamela Healy, pioneering female sailor and Olympian, Sailing Hall of Fame member
- Stan Honey, renowned navigator, founder of Etak and SportVision, Sailing Hall of Fame member, 2010 Yachtsman of the Year, two time Emmy Award winner
- Daniela Moroz, 4-time Formula Kiteboard World Champion, 2-time US Yachtswoman of the Year
- Christopher Michel, American Photographer
- Myron Spaulding, yacht designer
- Roy E. Disney, yachtsman, former CEO of the Walt Disney Company and nephew of Walt Disney
- Ed Zelinsky, founder of the Musée Mécanique
- James David Zellerbach, businessman and US Ambassador
- John Barneson, early California oil baron
- Clarence W. W. Mayhew, modernist architect

== Staff Commodores ==
Past Commodores of the St. Francis Yacht Club are:

- John M. Punnett, 1927–28
- Hiram W. Johnson Jr., 1929–30
- Henry W. Dinning, 1931
- Philip S. Baker, 1932–33
- Cyril R. Tobin, 1934
- Philip S. Finnell, 1935
- Frank A. Cressey Jr., 1936–37
- Templeton Crocker, 1938–39
- Stanley Barrows, 1940
- Leon de Fremery, 1940–41
- Sidney W. Ford, 1942–43
- Ingraham Read, 1944
- Howard H. Hurst, 1945
- Dr. Jessie L. Carr, 1946
- Tracy W. Harron, 1947–48
- James Wilhite, 1950
- Arthur W. Ford, 1951–52
- Charles A Langlais, 1953
- Franklin D. Heastand, 1954
- Thomas A. Short, 1955
- James Michael, 1956–57
- Thomas C. Ingersoll, 1958
- Dennis Jordan, 1959–60
- Leavittt L. Olds, 1961
- Christopher M. Jenks, 1962
- A. L. McCormick, 1963
- Stanlus Z. Natcher, 1964
- Tomlinson Moseley, 1965
- Dennis Jordan, 1966
- William L. Stewart III, 1967–68
- Townsend L. Schoonmaker, 1969
- Aldo Alessio, 1970
- Albert T. Simpson, 1971
- Robert D. Ford, 1972
- Leonard P. Delmas, 1973
- Hays A. McLellan, 1974
- Robert C. Keefe, 1975
- John E. Klopfer, 1976
- Eugene C. Harter, 1977
- Emmett A. Murphy, 1977
- James C. Nichol, 1978
- Kevin A. O’Conell, 1979
- Charles W. Corbitt, 1980
- Kauko E. Hallikainen, 1981
- Thomas H. Conroy, 1982
- John W. McFarland, 1983
- Howard A. Looney, 1984
- Edmond Brovelli Jr., 1985
- Merv Shenson, 1986
- George E. Sayre, 1987
- John H. Keefe Jr., 1988
- Richard F. Ford, 1989
- Peter A. Culley, 1990
- Karl A. Limbach, 1991
- James M. Kennedy, 1992
- William M. LeRoy, 1993
- Thomas V. Allen Jr., 1994
- Grant Settlemier, 1995
- P. Terry Anderlini, 1996
- Duane M. Hines, 1997
- Hans P. Treuenfels, 1998
- Monroe J. Wingate, 1999
- Bruce H. Munro, 2000
- Steve Taft, 2001
- Charles J. Hart, 2002
- Thomas M. Quigg, 2003
- Terry G. Klaus, 2004
- Douglas E. Holm, 2005
- Richard A. Pfaff, 2006
- Ray Lotto, 2007
- Joseph J. Horn III, 2008
- John R. McNeill, 2009
- David H. Sneary, 2010
- Patrick M. Nolan, 2011
- Peter B. Stoneberg, 2012
- James M. Cascino, 2013
- George Dort, 2014
- Sean E. Svendsen, 2015
- Kimball Livingston, 2016
- James Kiriakis, 2017
- Theresa Brandner, 2018
- Paul Heineken, 2019
- Ken Glidewell, 2020

== See also ==
- List of International Council of Yacht Clubs members
