= Farr 30 =

Lightweight one design racing keelboat

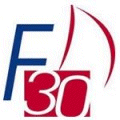

Development
- Designer: Bruce Farr
- Year: 1995
- No. built: Approx. 200
- Builders: Beneteau; Carroll Marine dk Yachts; McDell Marine; Ovington Boats; Waterline Systems
- Role: One design racer
- Name: Farr 30

Boat
- Displacement: 4,561 lb (2,069 kg)
- Draft: 6.75 ft (2.06 m)

Hull
- Type: monohull
- Construction: glassfibre
- LOA: 30.90 ft (9.42 m)
- LWL: 27.60 ft (8.41 m)
- Beam: 10.10 ft (3.08 m)
- Engine: Yanmar 1GM10 10 hp (7 kW) diesel engine

Hull appendages
- Keel: Fin keel
- Ballast: 1,997 lb (906 kg)
- Rudder: Spade-type rudder

Rig
- Rig type: Bermuda rig
- I foretriangle height: 38.29 ft (11.67 m)
- J foretriangle base: 10.89 ft (3.32 m)
- P mainsail luff: 40.55 ft (12.36 m)
- E mainsail foot: 14.57 ft (4.44 m)
- Rig other: Carbon Spars

Sails
- Sailplan: 9/10 Fractional rigged sloop
- Mainsail area: 377 sq ft (35.0 m^{2})
- Jib/genoa area: 226 sq ft (21.0 m^{2})
- Spinnaker area: 1,055 sq ft (98.0 m^{2})
- Upwind sail area: 603 sq ft (56.0 m^{2})
- Downwind sail area: 1,432 sq ft (133.0 m^{2})

Racing
- PHRF: 51-156

The Farr 30 is a lightweight one design racing keelboat. About 200 were built starting in 1995 by a number of builders in various countries, including Bénéteau in France.

It was originally called the Mumm 30, since it was sponsored by champagne producer G. H. Mumm until 2007.

It became a World Sailing recognized international class in 1997 and held its first Farr 30 World Championship that year in Marseille, France. It gave up its status in 2018 and the class club ceased operations in 2020. It was the one design class for the Tour de France à la voile from 1999 to 2010.

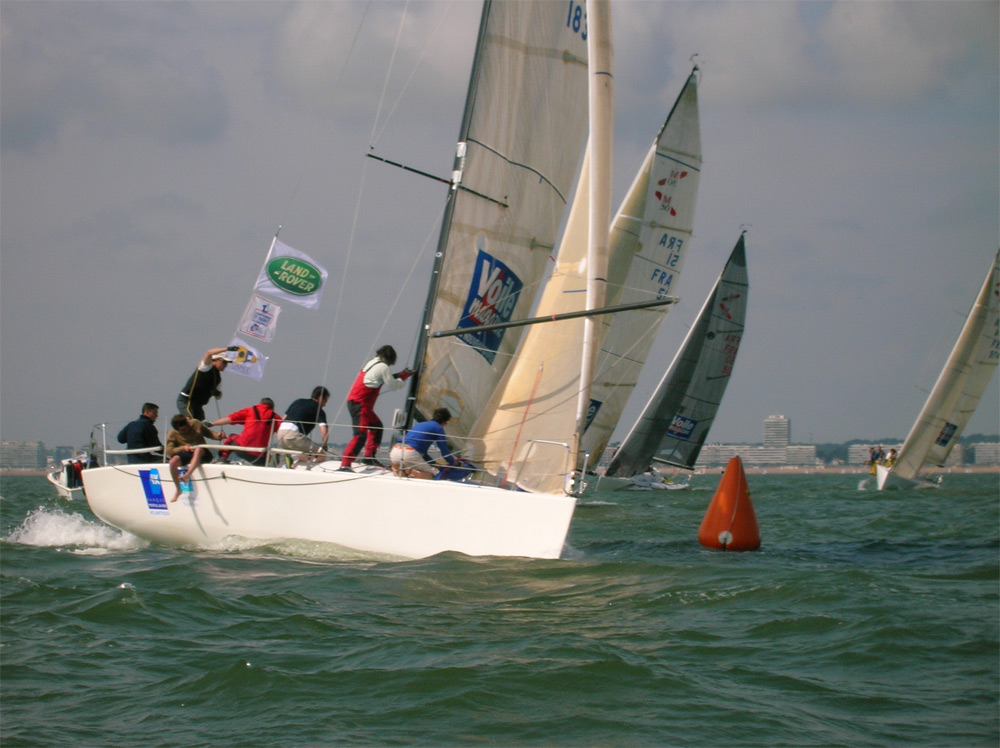
Farr 30

The hull and deck are built predominantly of a fibreglass and balsa sandwich. The hull has a nearly plumb stem, an open reverse transom, an internally mounted spade-type rudder controlled by a tiller and a fixed fin keel with a swept, weighted bulb. It has a theoretical hull speed of 7.03 kn (13.02 km/h).

It has a 9/10 fractional sloop rig, with a keel-stepped mast, two sets of swept spreaders, a carbon fibre mast, with an aluminium boom, with stainless steel rod standing rigging.

The design has a lightweight and minimal interior, with two berths. Cabin headroom is 44 in (112 cm).

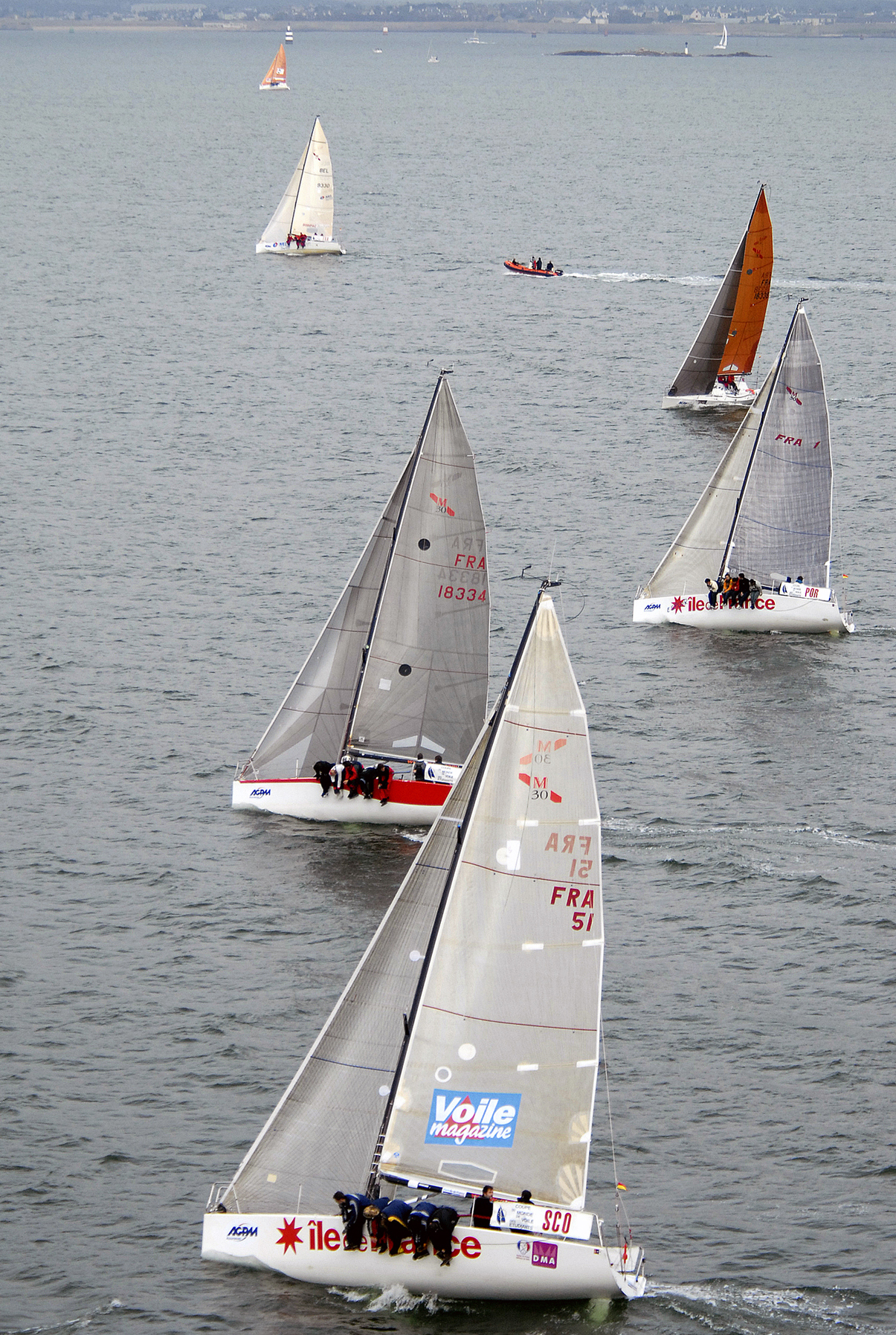
Farr 30s racing in the 2006 Student Yachting World Cup
