= Soto 40 =

International racing sailing class

Development
- Designer: Javier Soto Acebal
- Year: 2008

Boat
- Draft: 2.60 m (8.5 ft)

Hull
- LOA: 12.30 m (40.4 ft)
- LWL: 12.30 m (40.4 ft)
- Beam: 3.75 m (12.3 ft)

Soto 40 is a 12.30-metre (40.4 ft) sailboat class designed by Javier Soto Acebal.

Soto 40s were used in the Audi MedCup.
