= Mumm 36 =

Class of sailboat

Development
- Designer: Bruce Farr
- Year: 1992
- Builders: Bénéteau, Carroll Marine, Cookson Boats, Robertson & Caine

Boat
- Draft: 2.24 m (7.3 ft)

Hull
- LOA: 10.91 m (35.8 ft)
- LWL: 9.53 m (31.3 ft)
- Beam: 3.59 m (11.8 ft)

Mumm 36 is a 10.91-metre (35.8 ft) sailboat class designed by Bruce Farr, with about 100 boats built.

== History ==
The Mumm 36 designed by Farr was built by Bénéteau, Carroll Marine, Cookson Boats and Robertson & Caine between 1993 and 1998. The name comes from the class sponsor at the time Champagne Mumm.
