= Farr 40 =

40-foot one-design sailboat

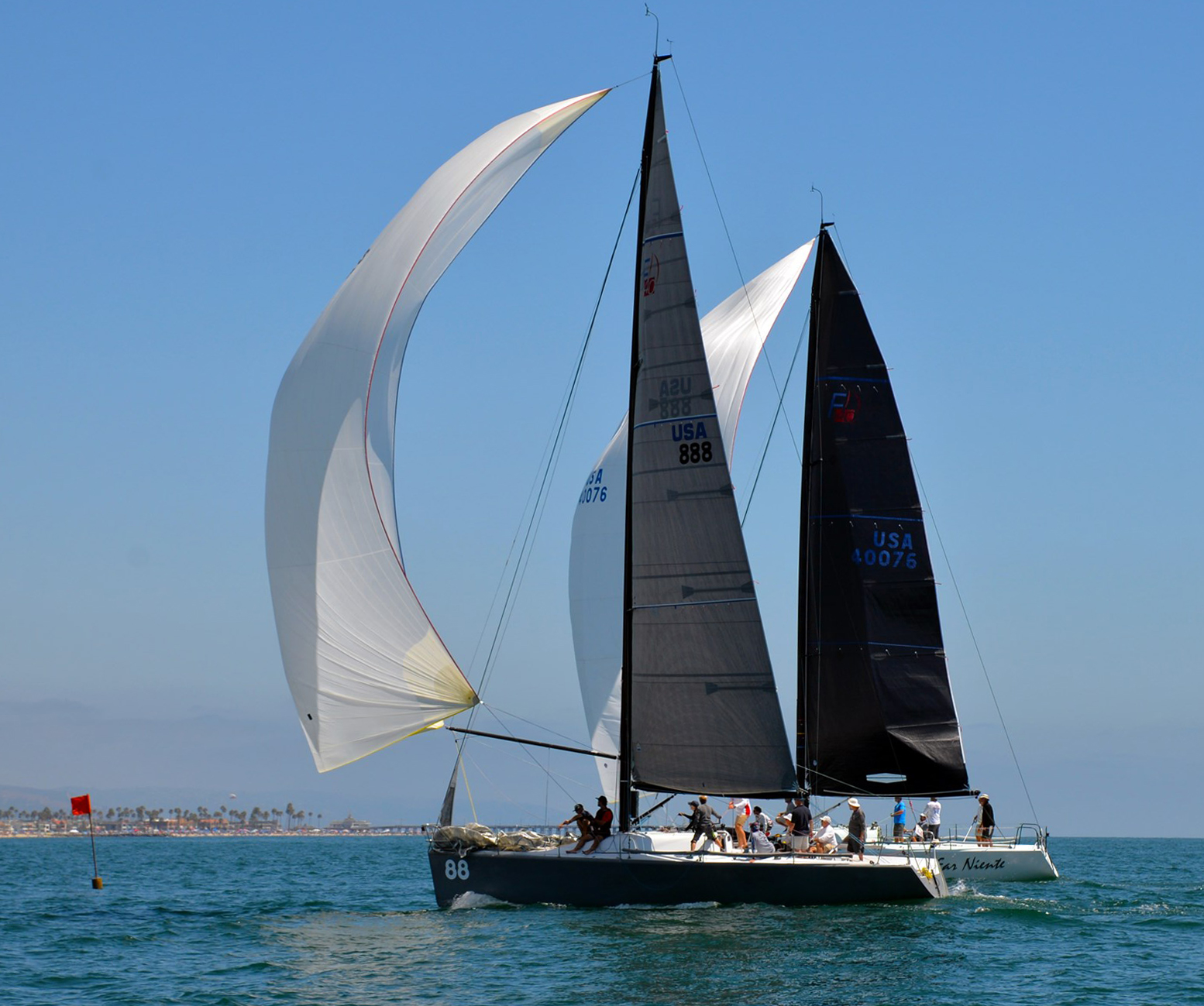

Development
- Designer: Farr Yacht Design
- Year: 1996
- Builder(s): Carroll Marine

Boat
- Crew: 9–10 (max 760 kg (1,680 lb))
- Displacement: 4,945 kg (10,902 lb)
- Draft: 2.6 m (8 ft 6 in)

Hull
- LOA: 40 ft 9 in (12.42 m)
- Beam: 4.03 m (13.2 ft)

Hull appendages
- Ballast: 2,250 kg (4,960 lb)

The Farr 40 is a 40-foot one-design sailboat designed by Farr Yacht Design in 1996 following after the Mumm 30. It was originally designed as a one design class but had some compromises in design to rate under the International Measurement System (IMS) rule. The class has held World Sailing class status since 1997.

Approximately 140 were built. In 1996, the first Farr 40 One Design was launched at Carroll Marine in Newport, Rhode Island. Although Carroll built the majority of the boats later boats were built by dk Yachts and US Watercraft.

== Events ==
=== World Championships ===
The Rolex - Farr 40 World Championship is the pinnacle event of the calendar. Featuring the highest level of competition with the Olympic, America's Cup and Volvo Ocean Race Veterans amongst this strictly Owner/Driver Class.

=== Offshore Team Racing World Championships ===
The class has been used by the Offshore Racing Congress as one of the classes for the World Championships which sees a boat in 3 boat classes competing for a national with the winner being the team with the best overall score.

=== Other circuits ===
The Farr 40 Class maintains an extensive international schedule that revolves around regional fleets in the U.S., Australia, Southern Europe and the Nordic region. In 2007, the European Circuit added three new events—the Nordic Farr 40 Championship in Hankø, Norway (July 5–8); the Skaw Farr 40 Race Week in Skagen, Denmark (July 12–14); and Rolex Baltic Week (August 17–19 in Neustadt, Germany)—in addition to the Rolex Capri Sailing Week (May 16–19 in Capri, Italy) and the Rolex Settimana Della Bocche (June 6–9 in Porto Cervo, Italy), where 21 boats vied for the Farr 40 European Championship. Many teams have planned to participate in the entire European circuit with an eye toward the ultimate competition: the Rolex Farr 40 Worlds.

=== Canada's Cup ===
Five (2001, 2003, 2007, 2010 and 2011) Canada's Cup international match racing series have been sailed in Farr 40s.
