= 2023 in sailing =

2023 in sailing describes the year's events in sailing.

== Passing ==
- Buddy Melges (USA)
- Derek Kelsall (GBR) Multihill Designer
- George Andreadis (sailor) (GRE) Olympian and World Sailing
- Larry Marks (sailor) (USA)
- Robin Asher (GBR)
- Stuart Jardine (GBR) Olympian
- Syd Fisher (AUS) Offshore Sailor
- Wolfgang Gerz (GER)

== World championships (INCOMPLETE) ==
Event		Host		Winners		Participation		Ref.
Date	Title	Club	Country	Event	Winners	Boats	Nats	Ref.
2022 World Championship held in 2023
29 December 2022 – 5 January 2023	2022 Cadet World Championship	(Australia) Williamstown	Cadet	Open	Fleet	Youth	Toby Bush (GBR); Kemmel Thorogood (GBR)	
15 January – 20 January	2022 Contender World Championship	(Australia) Perth	Contender	Open	Fleet		Mark Bulka (AUS)	
World Sailng - Events
31 July – 5 August	ORCi World Championships	(Germany) Kiel	ORC Rating	Fleet	Open	Class A		
31 July – 5 August	ORCi World Championships	(Germany) Kiel	ORC Rating	Fleet	Open	Class B		
31 July – 5 August	ORCi World Championships	(Germany) Kiel	ORC Rating	Fleet	Open	Class C		
10 August – 20 August	2023 Sailing World Championships	(Netherlands) The Hague	470 (dinghy)	Fleet	Mixed			
10 August – 20 August	2023 Sailing World Championships	(Netherlands) The Hague	49er	Fleet	Male			
10 August – 20 August	2023 Sailing World Championships	(Netherlands) The Hague	49erFX	Fleet	Female			
10 August – 20 August	2023 Sailing World Championships	(Netherlands) The Hague	ILCA 6	Fleet	Female			
10 August – 20 August	2023 Sailing World Championships	(Netherlands) The Hague	ILCA 7	Fleet	Male			
10 August – 20 August	2023 Sailing World Championships	(Netherlands) The Hague	Kite	Fleet	Male			
10 August – 20 August	2023 Sailing World Championships	(Netherlands) The Hague	Kite	Fleet	Female			
10 August – 20 August	2023 Sailing World Championships	(Netherlands) The Hague	Nacra 17	Fleet	Mixed			
10 August – 20 August	2023 Sailing World Championships	(Netherlands) The Hague	IQFoil	Fleet	Male			
10 August – 20 August	2023 Sailing World Championships	(Netherlands) The Hague	IQFoil	Fleet	Female			
22 April – 29 April	IRSA Marblehead World Championship	(Italy) Castiglione del Lago	Marblehead	Fleets /HMS	Open			
1 May – 3 May	IRSA 10 Rater World Championship	(Italy) Castiglione del Lago	10 Rater	Fleets /HMS	Open			
World Sailing - Single Person Dinghy
24 January – 31 January	Finn Gold Cup	(United States) Miami	Finn	Open	Fleet		Ed Wright (GBR)	
8 February – 16 February	ILCA 6 Master World Championships	(Thailand) Pattaya	ILCA 6	Open	Fleet	Apprentice Masters	Viktorija Andrulytė (LTU)	
8 February – 16 February	ILCA 6 Master World Championships	(Thailand) Pattaya	ILCA 6	Open	Fleet	Master	Jon Emmett (GBR)	
8 February – 16 February	ILCA 6 Master World Championships	(Thailand) Pattaya	ILCA 6	Open	Fleet	Grand Master	Allan Clark (CAN)	
8 February – 16 February	ILCA 6 Master World Championships	(Thailand) Pattaya	ILCA 6	Open	Fleet	Great Grand Master	Jeff Loosemore (AUS)	
8 February – 16 February	ILCA 6 Master World Championships	(Thailand) Pattaya	ILCA 6	Open	Fleet	Legends	Bill Symes (USA)	
19 February – 26 February	ILCA 7 Master World Championships	(Thailand) Pattaya	ILCA 7	Open	Fleet	Apprentice Masters	Keerati Bualong (THA)	
19 February – 26 February	ILCA 7 Master World Championships	(Thailand) Pattaya	ILCA 7	Open	Fleet	Master	Adonis Bougiouris (GRE)	
19 February – 26 February	ILCA 7 Master World Championships	(Thailand) Pattaya	ILCA 7	Open	Fleet	Grand Master	Brett Beyer (AUS)	
19 February – 26 February	ILCA 7 Master World Championships	(Thailand) Pattaya	ILCA 7	Open	Fleet	Great Grand Master	Tim Law (GBR)	
24 July – 28 July	Topper Class World Championships	(Republic of Ireland) Cork	Topper	Open	Fleet	Rig		
24 July – 28 July	Topper Class World Championships	(Republic of Ireland) Cork	Topper	Open	Fleet	Rig		
11 June – 21 June	Optimist World Championships	(Spain) Girona	Optimist	Open	Fleet			
23 June – 30 June	OK Dinghy World Championship	(United Kingdom) Lyme Regis	OK Dinghy	Open	Fleet			
8 July – 14 July	Europe World Championships	(Denmark) Vallensbæk	Europe	Open	Fleet			
World Sailing - Two Person Dinghy
27 July – 4 August	29er World Championship	(United Kingdom) Isle of Portland	29er	Open	Fleet			
1 October – 15 October	505 World Championship	(United States) Santa Cruz	505	Fleet	Open			
4 July – 14 July	B14 World Championship	(Italy) Torbole	B14	Open	Fleet			
22 July – 28 July	Vaurien World Championship	(France) Le Havre	Vaurien	Open	Fleet			
22 July – 30 July	Flying Dutchman World Championships	(Poland) Gdynia	Flying Dutchman	Open	Fleet			
22 July – 30 July	Mirror Class World Championship	(Republic of Ireland) Sligo	Mirror	Open	Fleet			
31 July – 4 August	RS500 World Championship	(Germany) Travemünde	RS500	Fleet	Open			
World Sailing - Keelboats
	2.4m World Championship	(Italy) Porto Cervo	2.4 Metre	Fleet	Open		Heiko KRÖGER GER	
20 September – 29 September	5.5m World Championship	(Italy) Porto Cervo	5.5 Metre	Fleet	Open			
31 August – 8 September	6m World Championship	(United Kingdom) Cowes Castle	6 Metre	Fleet	Open			
28 August – 2 September	8 Metre World Championship	(Italy) Genoa	8 Metre	Fleet	Open			
31 July – 5 August	12mR World Championships	(United States) Newport	12mR	Fleet	Open			
29 May – 3 June	Dragon World Championship	(Turkey) Bodrum	Dragon	Open	Fleet			
12 April – 21 April	Etchells World Championship	(United States) Miami	Etchells	Fleet	Mixed			
9 March – 25 March	Flying Fifteen World Championship	(Australia) Perth	Flying Fifteen	Open	Fleet			
31 July – 4 August	H-Boat World Championship	(Italy) Malcesine	H-boat	Fleet	Open			
21 July – 30 July	J/22 World Championship	(Germany) Travemünde	J/22	Open	Fleet			
9 September – 16 September	J/24 World Championship	(Greece) Thessaloniki	J/24	Fleet	Open			
30 October – 5 November	J/70 World Championship	(United States) St. Petersburg	J/70	Fleet	Open			
18 September – 24 September	J/80 World Championship	(Spain) Baiona	J/80	Fleet	Open			
26 August – 1 September	Micro Class World Championship	(Poland) Gdańsk	Micro	Fleet	Open	Production		
26 August – 1 September	Micro Class World Championship	(Poland) Gdańsk	Micro	Fleet	Open	Prototype		
17 June – 23 June	SB20 World Championship	(Netherlands) Scheveningen	SB20	Open	Fleet			
18 September – 23 September	Soling World Championship	(United States) Milwaukee	Soling	Fleet	Open			
16 September – 24 September	Star World Championship	(Italy) Scarlino	Starboat	Fleet	Open			
18 August – 25 August	Shark 24 World Championship	(Canada) Niagara-on-the-Lake	Shark 24	Fleet	Mixed			
22 August – 26 August	Tempest World Championship	(United Kingdom) Portsmouth	Tempest	Fleet	Mixed			
24 March – 31 March	Viper 640 World Championship	(United States) New Orleans	Viper 640	Fleet	Mixed			
World Sailing - Multihulls
11 July – 15 July	Hobie Dragoon World Championships	(Italy) Cesenatico	Hobie Dragoon	Open	Fleet			
17 July – 21 July	Hobie 14 World Championships	(Italy) Cesenatico	Hobie 14	Open	Fleet			
21 July – 30 July	Formula 18 World Championship	(Germany) Travemünde	Formula 18	Open	Fleet			
28 July – 4 August	Dart 18 World Championship	(United Kingdom) Bridlington	Dart 18	Open	Fleet			
19–26 February	Nacra 15 World Championship / Lauderdale Yacht Club	(United States) Fort Lauderdale	Nacra 15	Open	Fleet		Cody Roe (USA); KJ Hill (USA)	
10 September – 15 September	A-Class Catamaran World Championship	(France) Toulon	A-Class Catamaran	Fleet	Open			
25 September – 1 October	M32 World Championships	(United States) Newport	M32	Fleet	Open			
World Sailing - Yachts
21 August – 26 August	TP52 World Championships	(Spain) Barcelona	TP52	Fleet	Mixed			
9 September – 13 September	Sunfish World Championship	(Ecuador) Salinas	Sunfish	Fleet	Open			
30 September – 5 October	L30 Class World Championships	(Slovenia) Portorož	L30 Class					
World Sailing - Boards
22 May – 28 May	KiteFoil Masters World Championships	(Italy) Oristano	Foil kite	Open	Fleet			
27 December 2023 – 3 January 2024	IWCA World Championships	(Australia) Perth	Windsurfing	Fleet; Course	Male			
27 December 2023 – 3 January 2024	IWCA World Championships	(Australia) Perth	Windsurfing	Slalom	Male			
27 December 2023 – 3 January 2024	IWCA World Championships	(Australia) Perth	Windsurfing	Fleet; Distance	Male			
27 December 2023 – 3 January 2024	IWCA World Championships	(Australia) Perth	Windsurfing	Free Style	Male			
27 December 2023 – 3 January 2024	IWCA World Championships	(Australia) Perth	Windsurfing	Combined	Male	Fleet		
27 December 2023 – 3 January 2024	IWCA World Championships	(Australia) Perth	Windsurfing	Fleet	Female			
27 December 2023 – 3 January 2024	IWCA World Championships	(Australia) Perth	Windsurfing	Slalom	Female			
27 December 2023 – 3 January 2024	IWCA World Championships	(Australia) Perth	Windsurfing	Fleet	Female			
27 December 2023 – 3 January 2024	IWCA World Championships	(Australia) Perth	Windsurfing	Free Style	Female			
27 December 2023 – 3 January 2024	IWCA World Championships	(Australia) Perth	Windsurfing	Combined	Female			

== Pinnacle Oceanic Races ==
- 2023 The Ocean Race
- 2023 Route du Rhum

== Pinnacle Offshore Race ==
- RORC Caribbean 600
- Fastnet Race
- Sydney to Hobart
