= 2026 in sailing =

2026 in sailing describes the year's events in sailing

== Major Offshore Sailing ==
- Rolex 2026 Sydney to Hobart Yacht Race
- Rolex Middle Sea Race
- Rolex NYYC Invitational Cup

== World championships ==
Event		Host		Winners		Participation		Ref.
Date	Title	Club	Country	Event	Winners	Boats	Nats	Ref.
World Sailing - Events
	World Sailing Open Team Racing World Championships	Gamla Stans Yacht Sällskap	(Sweden) Stockholm, SWE	Team J/80	(United States) USA 1 Alex Curtiss; Colin Voigt; Davis Hanscom; Walker Banks; Sean Segerblom; Daniel Segerblom; Madison Bashaw; Marley Mais			
	Youth Sailing World Championships			ILCA Male				
	Youth Sailing World Championships			ILCA Female				
	Youth Sailing World Championships			IQ Foil Male				
	Youth Sailing World Championships			IQ Foil Female				
	Youth Sailing World Championships			Kite Male				
	Youth Sailing World Championships			Kite Female				
	Youth Sailing World Championships			420 Open/Mix				
	Youth Sailing World Championships			420 Female	{			
	Youth Sailing World Championships			29er Male/Mix				
	Youth Sailing World Championships			29er Female				
	Youth Sailing World Championships			Nacra 15 Mixed				
	Mixed Two Person Offshore World Championship		France	Mixed	Thomas Andre (FRA); Julia Colombe (FRA)			
	Women's Match Racing World Championship			Female				
	Youth Match Racing World Championship			Under				
	World Sailing Inclusion Championships			RS Venture Connect				
	World Sailing Inclusion Championships			Hansa 303 (single format)				
	World Sailing Inclusion Championships			ILCA (intellectual impairments)				
	World Sailing Inclusion Championships			FarEast 28R (blind sailing)				
	World Sailing Inclusion Championships			Seated Wing Foiling	Cancelled			
	Esailing World Championship			Open				
	Match Racing							
World Sailing Authorised
N/A	International Radio Sailing Association / 10 Rater World Championship	Held alternate years						
	International Radio Sailing Association / One Metre World Championship	Datchet Water Sailing Club	United Kingdom	Open	Alexis Carre (FRA)	84	25	
N/A	International Radio Sailing Association / Marblehead World Championship	Held alternate years						
May	Offshore Racing Congress / ORCi World Championships	Circolo del Remo e della Vela Italia	Italy	Class 0	USA 520 - SUMMER STORM; Design - TP 52; Berdon Andrew	15		
May	Offshore Racing Congress / ORCi World Championships	Circolo del Remo e della Vela Italia	Italy	Class A	SWE41 - RAN; Design Carkeek 40+ Zennstrom Niklas			
May	Offshore Racing Congress / ORCi World Championships	Circolo del Remo e della Vela Italia	Italy	Class B	ARG-5900 - KATARA Design - Somodi Julian	25		
May	Offshore Racing Congress / ORCi World Championships	Circolo del Remo e della Vela Italia	Italy	Class C	ITA-211 - ROBE DA MAT; Design - Mat-11; Buzzi Luigi	38		
May 18–25	Offshore Racing Congress / ORC Double-Handed World Championship	Scheveningen	Netherlands	Class A	NED 4103 - X-Esteem; XR 41; Robin Verhoef; John van der Starre			
May 18–25	Offshore Racing Congress / ORC Double-Handed World Championship	Scheveningen	Netherlands	Class B	NED 1030R - Jetpack; JPK 10.30; Diederik Forma; Martjin Graafmans	11		
May 18–25	Offshore Racing Congress / ORC Double-Handed World Championship	Scheveningen	Netherlands	Class C	NED 450 - Waverider; Sun Fast 3200; Willem Schopman; Max Deckers	12		
	World Sailing Special Event; PWA World Tour	Various		Male				
	World Sailing Special Event; PWA World Tour	Various		Female				
World Sailing - Single Person Dinghy
	Contender World Championship			Open				
	Europe World Championships	Gdansk	Poland	Male	Martin Brønlund Olesen (DEN)	62	13	
	Europe World Championships	Gdansk	Poland	Female	Marie-Amandine Vandeghinste (BEL)	29	7	
Feb 12-19	Finn World Championship	Royal Queensland Yacht Squadron	Australia	Open	Alessandro Marega (ITA)	66	15	
Feb 20-27	Finn Masters World Championship	Royal Queensland Yacht Squadron	Australia	Open 40+	Brendan Casey (AUS)	101	15	
	ILCA 4 World Championships			Male 12-18	Leo Gosling (SUI)	298	46	4
	ILCA 4 World Championships			Female 12-18	Eleni Triantou (GRE)	150	46	4
	ILCA 6 Youth World Championship			Male 15-18	Erik Scheidt (BRA)	307	43	
	ILCA 6 Youth World Championship			Female 15-18	Hermionie Ghicas (GRE)	122	35	
	ILCA 6 Female Under 21 World Championship			Female Under 21	Ginevra Caracciolo Di Brienza (ITA)	96	33	
	ILCA 7 Male Under 21 World Championship			Male - U21	Antonio Pascali (ITA)	52	23	
	ILCA 6 Masters World Championships			6 - Apprentice				
	ILCA 6 Masters World Championships			6 - Masters				
	ILCA 6 Masters World Championships			6 - Grand Masters				
	ILCA 6 Masters World Championships			6 - Great Grand Masters				
	ILCA 6 Masters World Championships			6 - Legends				
	ILCA 6 Female World Championship			Female				
	ILCA 7 World Championship			Male				
	ILCA 7 Masters World Championships	}		7 - Apprentice				
	ILCA 7 Masters World Championships	}		7 - Masters				
	ILCA 7 Masters World Championships	}		7 - Grand Masters				
	ILCA 7 Masters World Championships	}		7 - Great Grand & Legends				
	Moth World Championship			Open				
	Musto Skiff World Championship	Yacht Club de Carnac	France	Open	Robert Richardson (GBR)	37		
	O'PEN Skiff World Championships			Open - U13				
	O'PEN Skiff World Championships			Open - U17				
June	OK Dinghy World Championship		Denmark	Open	Andrew Mills (GBR)	203		
	Optimist World Championship	Royal Yacht Club de Tanger	Morocco	Team	Spain			
	Optimist World Championship	Royal Yacht Club de Tanger	Morocco	Open	Manuel Bragança (BRA)	284	70	
	RS Aero World Championships	Quiberon	France	5	Raphael Olsthoorn (FRA)	62	12	
	RS Aero World Championships	Quiberon	France	6	Sofiia Naumenko (UKR)	50	11	
	RS Aero World Championships	Quiberon	France	7	Peter Barton (GBR)	40	10	
	RS Aero World Championships	Quiberon	France	9	Baabii O Flower (CAN)	15	7	
	RS Tera World Championships	Travemunder Woche	Germany	Sport	Freddie Harrison (GBR)	62	9	
	RS Tera World Championships	Travemunder Woche	Germany	Pro	Charlie Hunt (GBR)	63	10	
	Sunfish World Championship	Salinas Yacht Club (25x17px)	Ecuador	Open	Simon Gomez Ortiz (COL (25x17px)	84		
	Topper World Championships	Société des Régates de Saint Pierre	France	Open 5.3	Hari Clark (GBR)	134	10	
	Topper World Championships	Société des Régates de Saint Pierre	France	Open 4.2	Freddie Smallwood (GBR)	42	4	
	Zoom 8 World Championships			Open				
World Sailing - Two Person Dinghy
	29er World Championship			Open				
	49er World Championship		{	49er Male				
	49er World Championship		{	49FX Female				
	49er Junior World Championships			49er Male				
	49er Junior World Championships			49FX Female				
July 3–11	420 World Championships	Centre Nautique Biscarosse Olympique	France	Male & Mixed				
July 3–11	420 World Championships	Centre Nautique Biscarosse Olympique	France	Female				
July 3–11	420 World Championships	Centre Nautique Biscarosse Olympique	France	U17 Open				
	470 World Championships			Mixed				
	470 Junior World Championships			Open				
	505 World Championship	Hayling Island Sailing Club	United Kingdom	Open	Jan-Philipp Hofmann (GER); Felix Brockerhoff (GER)	89	10	
	Cadet World Championship			Open				
	Flying Dutchman World Championship			Open	Szabolcs Majthényi (HUN); András Domokos (HUN)			
	Flying Junior World Championship		Italy	Open	Guido Sol (NED); Koen De Nooijer (NED)	52		
	GP14 World Championship		Ireland	Open	Ger Owens (IRL); Mel Morris (IRL)			
	Lightning World Championship	Held alternate years						
N/A	Youth Lightning World Championship	Tuusulanjärven Purjehtijat	Finland	Open	Rory Walsh (CAN); Andre Deseau (CAN); Gustave Deseau (CAN)	16	8	
	Masters Lightning World Championship	Held alternate years						
	Mirror World Championship			Open				
	RS Feva World Championship			Open				
	Open Snipe World Championship			Open				
	Youth Snipe World Championship			Open				
N/A	Female Snipe World Championship	Held alternate years						
N/A	Masters Snipe World Championship	Held alternate years						
July 14–21	Tasar World Championship			Open				
July 13–19	Vaurien World Championship			Open				
World Sailing - Multihull Classes
	Diam 24 World Championship							
	A-Cat World Championship			Foiling				
	A-Cat World Championship			Classic				
	Dart 18 World Championship			Open				
	Formula 16 World Championship			Open				
Jan 27 -3Feb	Formula 18 World Championship	Jervoise Bay Sailing Club	Australia	Open	Brett Burvill; Max Puttman	75		
	Raid Formula 18 World Championship							
	GS32 World Championship							
	Hobie 14 World Championship							
	Hobie 16 World Championships							
	Hobie Dragoon World Championship							
	Hobie F18 World Championship							
	M32 World Championship			Open				
	Nacra 15 World Championship	Plymouth	United Kingdom	Open				
	Nacra 17 World Championship			Mixed				
	Nacra 20 World Championship							
	Topcat K1 World Championships			Open				
	Tornado World Championships			Open				
World Sailing - Keelboat Classes
	2.4 Metre World Championship	Koninklijke Watersportvereniging Sneek	Netherlands	Open	Heiko Kröger (GER)	85	17	
	5.5 Metre World Championship	Yacht Club of Greece	Greece	Open	Przemysław Gacek (POL); Mateusz Kusznierewicz (POL); Killian Weise (GER)	19	9	
	6 Metre World Championship		{	Modern				
	6 Metre World Championship		{	Classic				
	8 Metre World Cup			Open				
	12 Metre World Championship			Open				
	Dragon World Championship			Open				
	Etchells World Championship			Open				
	Flying Fifteen World Championship			Open				
	2.3 Hansa World Championships			Open				
	1x303 Hansa World Championships			Open				
	2x303 Hansa World Championships			Open				
	Liberty Hansa World Championships			Open				
	H-Boat World Championship			Open				
	Melges 24 World Championship			Open				
	Micro World Championship			Open				
	J/22 World Championship			Open				
	J/24 World Championship			Open				
	J/70 World Championship	Clube Naval de Cascais	France	Open	Haroldo Solberg (BRA); Mário Tinoco (BRA); Gabriel Silva (BRA); Carlos Robles (BRA)	100	32	
June	Corinthian J/70 World Championship	Club La Pelle & Union Nautique Marseillaise	France	Open	BER-1328; Alec Cutler (BER); Charles Pucciariello (USA); Keith Davids (BER); Bradley Rodi (USA)	66	20	
	Mixed J/70 World Championship	Royal Danish Yacht Club	Denmark	Open	Joan Cardona Mendez (ESP); Gerardo Prego Menor (ESP); Pilar Fernanda Amaro Filgueira (ESP); Fatima Diz Barreras (ESP)	178	14	
	J/80 World Championship	CORK, Kingston	Canada	Open	James Buley (USA); Jackson Benvenutti (USA); Bill Hardesty (USA); Skip Dieball (USA)			
	Platu 25 World Championship			Open				
	RC44 World Championship			Open				
	RS21 World Championship			Open				
	SB20 World Championship			Open				
	Shark 24 World Championship			Open	Peter Van Rossem (CAN); Matt Fair (CAN); Josh Wilby (CAN)			
N/A	Sonar World Championship							
	Star World Championship			Open				
	Viper 640 World Championship			Open				
	Tempest World Championship			Open				
	Yngling World Championship			Open				
World Sailing - Yacht Classes
	ClubSwan 50 World Championship			Open				
	Fareast 28r World Championship							
Series	IMOCA 60 World Championship	Open						
	L30 World Championship			Open				
July	TP52 World Championship	Yach Club Costa Smeralda	Italy	Open	USA 5095 (05) - Sled; Takashi Okura (JPN); Francesco Bruni (ITA); Murray Jones (AUS); Andrea Visintini (ITA); Don Cowie (NZL); Ryan Godfrey (AUS); Christian Kamp (DEN); Jeremy Lomas (NZL); Ivan Peute (NED); Ash Edwards (NZL); Andrew McCorquodale (CAN); Cian Guilfoyle (IRL); Hideki Wakayama (JPN); Simon Johnson (IRL)	15	25	
BOARD CLASSES
	Formula Windsurfing World Championship			Open				
	IWSA Formula Wing World Championship			Male				
	IWSA Formula Wing World Championship			Female				
	IKA Formula Kite World Championships			Male				
	IKA Formula Kite World Championships			Female				
	IKA Youth World Championships			Male				
	IKA Youth World Championships			Female				
Feb 10-14	IKA Twin Tip Racing World Championships		Thailand	Male				
Feb 10-14	IKA Twin Tip Racing World Championships		Thailand	Female				
	IFCA Slalom World Championships			Fin - Male				
	IFCA Slalom World Championships			Fin - Female				
	IFCA Slalom World Championships			Fin - Master				
	IFCA Slalom World Championships			Fin - Youth Male				
	IFCA Slalom World Championships			Fin - Youth Female				
	IFCA Slalom World Championships			Fin - Junior Male				
	IFCA Slalom World Championships			Fin - Junior Female				
	IFCA Slalom World Championships			Foil - Open				
	IFCA Slalom World Championships			Foil - Youth Female				
	IFCA Slalom World Championships			Foil - Youth Female				
	iQFoil World Championships			Male				
	iQFoil World Championships			Female				
	iQFoil U23 World Championships			<U23 - Male				
	iQFoil U23 World Championships			<U23 - Female				
	Raceboard World Championships			U21 - Male				
	Raceboard World Championships			U21 - Female				
	Raceboard World Championships			Male				
	Raceboard World Championships			Female				
	Raceboat Masters World Championship			Open 40+				
	Speed Windsurfing World Championship			Male				
	Speed Windsurfing World Championship			Female				
April 3–9	Techno 293 World Championships	Foca	Turkey	U13 Open	Antal Körtvélyesi (HUN)	28	7	
April 3–9	Techno 293 World Championships	Foca	Turkey	U15 Male	Joshua Castro-Jurek (ESP)	36	11	
April 3–9	Techno 293 World Championships	Foca	Turkey	U15 Female	Cristina Iglesias-Rubio (ESP)	23	9	
April 3–9	Techno 293 World Championships	Foca	Turkey	U17 Male	Orestis-Nikolaos Palamidis (GRE)	52	15	
April 3–9	Techno 293 World Championships	Foca	Turkey	U17 Female	Johanna Lukk (EST)	39	12	
April 3–9	Techno 293 World Championships	Foca	Turkey	+Rig Male	Julien Omey (BEL)	56	10	
April 3–9	Techno 293 World Championships	Foca	Turkey	+Rig Female	Teresa Medde (ITA)	25	7	
	Techno Wind Foil 130 World Championships							
	Windsurfer World Championship			Open				
	X-15 World Championship							
