= List of World Championships medalists in sailing (radio sailing classes) =

This is a list of World Championships medalists in sailing in the radio sailing classes recognised by the International Radio Sailing Association and World Sailing.

== International One Metre ==
One Metre World Championship

== International Marblehead ==
Marblehead World Championship

== International Ten Rater ==
Year	Gold	Silver	Bronze	Ref.
1999, Changi; Singapore	Graham Bantock (GBR); Design - Prizm (Own Design)	Philip Playle (GBR); Design - Prizm	Mark Dennis (GBR)	
2016, Lake Garda; Italy	Brad Gibson (GBR); Trance (Own Design)	Graham Bantock (GBR); Diamond (Own Design)	Christophe Boisnault (FRA); Rubis	
2018, Biblis; Germany	Brad Gibson (GBR); Trance (Own Design)	Christophe Boisnault (FRA); Kamsin	Matteo Longhi (ITA); Nioutaine	
2020, West Kirby; United Kingdom	Cancelled COVID 19			
2023; Castiglione del Lago; Italy	Matteo Longhi (ITA); Design - "Trance" by Brad Gibson	Graham Bantock (GBR); Design - "Diamond" (Own Design)	Patrice Montero (FRA); Design - "Diamond"	
2025; France	Ante Kovacevic (CRO); Design - "Diamond"	Graham Bantock (GBR); Design - "Diamond" (Own Design)	Guillaume Florent (FRA); Design - "NIOUTAINE"	

== International A Class ==
Year	Gold	Silver	Bronze
2005, Gosport	Graham BANTOCK (GBR) Design Sword / Graham Bantock	Ken BINKS (GBR) Design Sword / Graham Bantock	Peter WILES (GBR) Design Sweet 9 / Roger Stollery
