= Radio-controlled boat =

Boat controlled with radio-controlling equipment

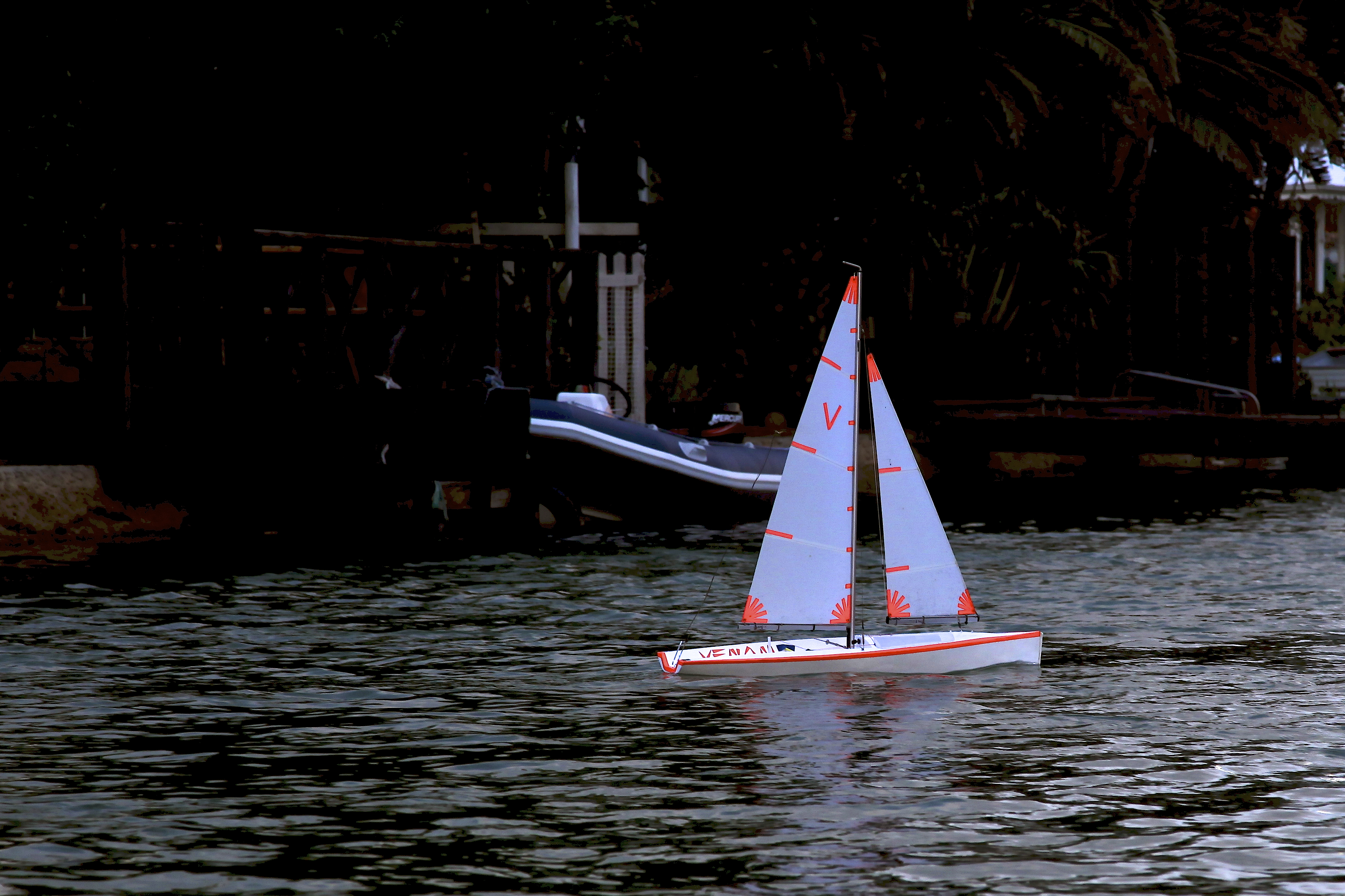
A mass-produced radio-controlled yacht

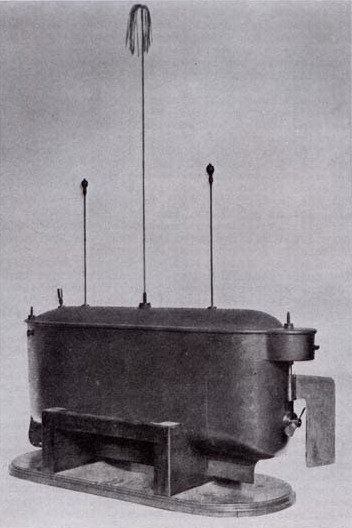
In 1898, Tesla demonstrated a radio-controlled boat (U.S. patent 613,809 —Method of an Apparatus for Controlling Mechanism of Moving Vehicle or Vehicles).

A radio-controlled boat is a boat or ship model controlled remotely with radio control equipment.

== Type ==
=== Fun sport ===
Electric sport boats are the most common type of boat amongst casual hobbyists. Hobby-quality boat speed generally start at around 20 mph and go up from there, and can be just as fast or faster than their internal-combustion counterparts, with the latest in lithium polymer and brushless motor technology. Ready-to-run speedboats from AquaCraft, ProBoat and OffshoreElectrics can reach speeds over 40 mph out of the box and with modifications can reach well into the 50-60 mph range. These types of boats are referred to as "hobby grade" and can be found only at hobby shops and retailers. "Toy grade" boats which are obtained through mass consumer retailers, are generally much slower and their maximum speeds are usually less than 15 mph.

=== Scale ===
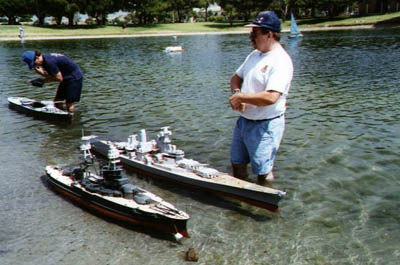
Large scale model warships in San Diego

Scale boats are replicas of full-size boats. They are to scale of the full sized ones. They can be small enough to fit into your hand, or large, trailer-transported models weighing hundreds of pounds. More often than not they are a miniaturized version of a prototype, built using plans and/or photos, although there are variants that utilize freelance designs. An offshoot of this style of marine RC's is radio-controlled submarines.

=== Sailboats ===
Sailboats use the power of the wind acting on sails to propel the boat. Model sailboats are typically controlled via a multi-channel radio transmitter in the hands of the operator with a corresponding receiver in the boat. By changing the position of the two joysticks on the transmitter signals are sent over two separate channels on a single radio frequency (assigned to the individual boat/operator). On the boat, the radio receiver is connected to two battery-powered electric motors or servos. Signals from the radio transmitter are interpreted by the radio receiver and translated into instructions to change the position of the servos. One servo controls the position of both main and jib sails together (allowing the sails to be trimmed), the other the position of the rudder (allowing the boat to be steered).

=== Racing sailboats ===
The racing of radio-controlled yacht racing is governed by the same World Sailing Racing Rules of Sailing that are used for full-sized crewed sailing boats (with the inclusion of Appendix E, that introduces special rules to govern the radio-controlled sport). Vane controlled boats sail under their own rules.

There are four international classes of radio sailing boats recognized by the International Radio Sailing Association (IRSA) who are recognised by World Sailing:

- International One Metre (IOM)

The IOM class rules specify a monohull of maximum length 1000 mm, with maximum draught 420 mm. There is a minimum weight of 4000 g, which makes homebuilding of competitive boats possible. The IOM has three one-design rigs. To keep costs down, hull materials are restricted to either wood or glassfiber, while masts and booms are restricted to either aluminium or wood. (International One Metre Class Association)

- International Marblehead

A Marblehead has a maximum length of 1290 mm and a maximum draught of ca 700 mm, but no minimum displacement. Up to six rigs are allowed, the tallest being about 2200 mm.

- International Ten Rater
- International A Class (A), the largest of the international radio sailing classes.

Other classes of international significance include the CR-914, the RC Laser, the Micro Magic, and the RG-65..

=== Racing power boats ===
There are dozens of types and classes of race boats. They are mainly organised by engine type and hull type.

Race: Circuit and Straight line is established at National and International levels

Engine: Electric, Glow Plug, Flash Steam and Gas (petrol)

Hull: Mono, Hydro, Cat, Outrigger and Eco (self righting jelly mold shape)

Classes are further divided by battery type and count, Engine CC, Deep V Mono, Stepped Mono, sub surface and surface piercing prop's etc.

Power boats are typically fast electric or internal combustion, (ignition engine or glow plug R/C engine based) and some are steam powered (conventional type, and also flash steam). (At one time some boats used engines working on the compression ignition principle. These were not diesels in the true sense of the word but the modelling fraternity frequently referred to them as such. A few enthusiasts still operate such engines.) The power is commonly used to rotate a submerged propeller, aircraft propeller or jet which in turn provide the thrust to move the craft. Typically power boats have two controls, rudder, outboard motor or stern drive and throttle control. Powered scale boats will often have additional remote-controlled functions to improve realism, e.g. sounding fog horns, rotating radar antennae etc. Some of the more sophisticated powered racing boats may also have additional remote-controlled functions. These may include remote mixture control allowing the driver to optimise the fuel/air mixture during a race. Another function occasionally implemented for racing boats using a surface piercing propeller is remote control of depth or angle of thrust. There are three main types of power boat. RTR(ready-to-run), ARTR(almost-ready-to-run), and kit versions are available. All thoroughbred racing boats are made from kits and the builders add their own gear and radio.

Radio-controlled racing boats are designed for maximum speed and maneuverability. Various styles of racing include circuits of different shapes laid out on the water with buoys. The most common courses are the 1/6-mile oval that consists of 330-foot straight sections followed by 70-foot-diameter turns. The International Model Power Boat Association (IMPBA), North American Model Boat Association (NAMBA) and Offshore Model Racing Association (OMRA) have specific rules and regulations to address the course, race rules, and formats.

In addition to oval racing there are straightaway (SAW) racing. This is a contest to see how fast you can make the boat go in a straight line. Timed events are held where the boats need to go through a starting light and an ending light. The speed is calculated by the timed difference from start to stop vs the length between the lights. Again IMPBA and NAMBA rules apply.

Some enthusiasts race in the sea, controlling their craft from a pursuing boat known as a "chase boat". These courses will usually be a few miles long and the competition is judged against the clock to find the fastest in class. Within the various styles of racing there will be a number of classes depending upon engine size and type. Ocean and river going boats tend to be powered by internal combustion engines. Sprint Type races and electric races are usually held on calmer lake waters.

Electric boats for racing are capable of reaching speeds of more than 50 mph and run times of around 10 minutes. Electric boats also hold the 100-yard sprint record against rival internal combustion powerplants since 2000.

Tethered racing and free-running craft were popular prior to the advent of cheap radio control. The speeds of tethered racing vehicles are higher than 160 mph for boats and 230 mph for cars, but these craft bear little resemblance to real-world vehicles, and could not obtain anywhere near those speeds if converted to radio control.

=== Combat ===
IJN Kagero stern damage

A competitive offshoot of the radio control model warships hobby that involves the firing of projectiles, usually propelled by gas, at opposing ships to sink or damage them. Models are usually simplified to facilitate repair. Ships are fitted with bilge pumps; Bb, 3/16", 7/32" or 1/4" weapons that fire ball bearings. The ship's hull plating is balsa to keep the force required to penetrate down to safe levels, By Rules, they are designed to be sinkable and in fact they do on a regular basis.

=== Tugboats ===
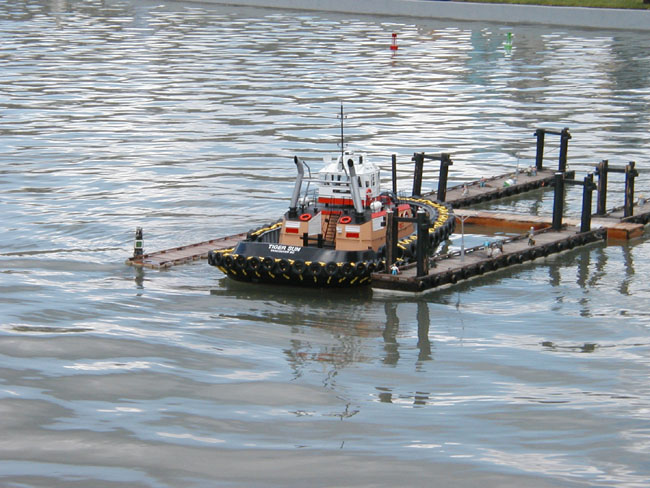
2005 Bellevue, WA Regatta, Gary King's Tiger Sun in the starting dock.

Scale model tug boats are often built to include scale drive systems. They use standard propellers and rudder(s), Becker rudders, Kort nozzles, steerable kort nozzles, Z-drives or Voith-Schneider cycloidial drives. Clubs will often host maneuvering competitions where participants are tasked to run their boats in the most realistic manner possible. This can be judged with or without a "tow" or barge attached.

Model Tug boats were often used for filming on three shows. TUGS, Thomas & Friends and Theodore Tugboat in which they had moving eyes and as for TUGS moving heads.

== See also ==
- Model warship combat
- Model yachting
- Radio-controlled model
- Radio-controlled submarine
- Ship model
