= List of World Championships medalists in sailing =

This is a List of World Championships medalists in sailing.

- List of World Championships medalists in sailing (centreboard classes)
- List of World Championships medalists in sailing (juniors and youth classes)
- List of World Championships medalists in sailing (keelboat classes)
- List of World Championships medalists in sailing (multihull classes)
- List of World Championships medalists in sailing (windsurfer classes)
- List of World Championships medalists in sailing (yacht classes)
- List of World Championships medalists in sailing (radio sailing classes)

== See also ==
- World championships in sailing
