= RS 500 =

RS 500 may refer to:

- Rolling Stone's 500 Greatest Albums of All Time
- RS500, dinghy
- RS500 World Championship, dinghy event
- Ford Sierra RS500 Cosworth
- Ford Focus RS500
