= Yachting Monthly =

British yachting magazine

- Cover of the December 2024 issue
- Editor: Theo Stocker
- Categories: Yachting
- Frequency: Monthly
- Circulation: 24,624 (ABC Jan - Dec 2013) (print and digital editions)
- Publisher: Future PLC
- Founded: 1906
- Country: United Kingdom
- Based in: Bath
- Language: English
- Website: www.yachtingmonthly.com

Yachting Monthly is a monthly magazine about yachting published by Future PLC. It is edited by Theo Stocker. The magazine is headquartered in Bath.

== History ==
At its launch in 1906, from the offices of The Field, The Manchester Guardian reviewed the first issue describing it as, "a substantial and well-illustrated 80-page magazine which really contains something to read".

From February 1918 it became the official magazine of the Royal Navy Volunteer Reserve, and the name was changed to The Yachting Monthly and Magazine of the R.N.V.R, however the name as simplified to Yachting Monthly in 1921

== Editors ==
Through its over one hundred-year history the magazine has been edited by several people whose significance in the yachting world goes beyond being its editor. This section is not a comprehensive coverage of all editors.

=== Herbert Reiach ===
The founding editor, from the publication of the first edition in May 1906 until his death at sea on his yacht on 16 July 1921. Born in Edinburgh around 1873, the son of George Reiach, General Inspector of Scottish Fisheries, he went to school in Edinburgh and had worked as a Naval Architect in Leith, Liverpool and Camper and Nicholsons with his friend Charles Nicholson. He was an editor at The Field in the late 1890s

=== Malden Heckstall-Smith ===
Editor from 1921 to 1926.

Brother of Brooke Heckstall-Smith, who wrote the 1911 Encyclopædia Britannica entry on Yachting, and as secretary of the Yacht Racing Association played a key role in the development of the International Rule.

With Charles Nicholson he devised the 5.5metre rule in 1948.

He devised the International A Class of the International Radio Sailing Associationin 1922.

=== Maurice Griffiths ===
Editor from 1926 to 1939 and from 1945 to 1967.

=== Kathleen Palmer ===
Editor from 1939 to 1945 while Maurice Griffiths was serving in the RNVR.

=== Des Sleightholme ===
Editor from 1967 to 1985

He had worked at Yachts and Yachting for 12 years before moving to Yachting Monthly in 1966, becoming editor 6 months later

=== Andrew Bray ===
Editor from 1985 to 1992

=== Geoff Pack ===
Editor from 1992 to 1997

He had contributed many freelance articles to Yachting Monthly, while working as a Charter Skipper before taking up his editing role.

=== James Jermain ===
Editor from 1997 to 1999

=== Sarah Norbury ===
Editor from 1999 to 2003

=== Paul Gelder ===
Editor from 2003 to 2012

Noted for spearheading the campaign to restore Gipsy Moth IV

=== Kieran Flatt ===
Editor from 2012 to 2017

=== Theo Stocker ===
The editor from 2017
