= Mixed Two Person Offshore World Championship =

Yacht Racing World Championship

The Mixed Two Person Offshore Sailing World Championship also referred to as the "Two Handed" or "Doubles" Offshore World Championship is an annual international sailing regatta organised by the host club in partnership with World Sailing, the sports IOC recognized governing body. A similar recognised event is run by ORC using handicaps rather than one design boats and more inshore focused see Two Person ORCi World Championships

== Editions ==
Event			Host			Boats		Sailors			Ref.
Ed.	Date	Year	Host club	Location	Nat.	Type	No.	Comp.	Nats	Cont.	Ref.
N/A		2019			Malta	L30		POSTPONED TO 2020			
N/A		2020			Malta	L30		COVID			
1		2021	Yacht Club Italiano; Porticciolo Duca degli Abruzzi; CC Aniene; RYCC Savoia; Yacht Club Gaeta; Circolo della Vela Brindisi; Circolo Vela Bari; Circolo Velico Ravennate; Compagnia della Vela Venezia	Brindisi to Venice	Italy	Figaro 3					
		2022	NOT HELD								
2		2023		Taranto	Italy	Figaro 3					
3		2024	Lorient Grand Large	Lorient	France	Sunfast 30OD		22			
4		2025	Royal Ocean Racing Club	Cowes	United Kingdom	Sunfast 30OD					
5	23 Sept -2Oct	2026	Cercle Nautique & Touristique du Lacydon (CNTL)	Marseille	France	Sunfast 30OD					

== Winners ==
Year	Gold	Silver	Bronze	Ref.
2021	Claudia Rossi (ITA); Pietro D'Alì (ITA)	Giovanna Valsecchi (ITA); Andrea Pendibene (ITA)		
2022				
2023	Matteo Sericano (ITA); Cecilia Zorzi (ITA)	George Kennedy (GBR); Ellie Driver (GBR)	Sophia Faguet (BEL); Jonas Gerckens (BEL)	
2024	Maggie Adamson (GBR); Cal Finlayson (GBR)	Elodie Bonafous (FRA); Basile Bourgnon (FRA)	Charlotte Yven (FRA); Lois Berrehar (FRA)	
2025	Théa Khelif (FRA); Thomas André (FRA)	Zeb Fellows (GBR); Willow Bland (GBR)	Dominique Knuppel (URU); Ferderice Waksman (URU)	
2026	Thomas Andre (FRA); Colombe Julia (FRA)	Annie Stevenson (AUS); Peter Winter (AUS)	Jonas Gerchens (BEL); Djemila Tassin (BEL)	
