= One Metre World Championship =

The International One Metre World Championship also referred to as the IOM World Championship is an bi-annual international sailing regatta of One Metre radio sailing yachts, organized by the host club on behalf of the International One Metre Class Association and recognized/authorised by International Radio Sailing Association and World Sailing, the sports IOC recognized governing body. The number of competitors is restricted due to the fleet management system used with 2013 being the last time entry hasn't been capped.

== Editions ==
Host clubs of the One Metre World Championship

Ed.	Date		Location			Competitors					Ref.
Ed.	Day/Month	Year	Host club	City	Country	Boats	Nat.	Cont.			Ref.
1	-	1994		Saint-Cyr, Vienne	France	55	12	4			
2	11-16 Feb	1997	Wellington Radio Yacht Club	Wellington	New Zealand	60	10	3			
3	5-10 Apr	1999			Malta	80	17+	4+			
4	12-19 May	2001	Sailing Club of Rijeka, SCOR	Omisalj	Croatia	79	15	4			
5	3-11 Jun	2003	Royal Vancouver Yacht Club	Vancouver	Canada	82	16	5			
6	15-24 Sep	2005	Mooloolara Radio Yacht Club	Kawana Waters, Mooloolaba, Queensland	Australia	84	14	5			
7	13-20 Oct	2007	Yachting Club de la Pointe Rouge	Marseille, Bouches-du-Rhône	France	76	22	5			
8	21-28 Jun	2009		Carlisle Bay	Barbados	66	14	4			
9	28May -4Jun	2011	West Kirby Sailing Club / Birkenhead Radio Sailing & Power Club	West Kirby. Wirral	United Kingdom	76	22	5			
10	12-19 Oct	2013	Sdot Yam Sailing Club	Sdot Yam	Israel	43	11	3			
11	8-16 May	2015		Central Lake, Foster City	United States	76	21	5			
12	14-21 May	2017	VRC Pierrelatte	Pierrelatte	France	76	22	5			
13	15-23 Sep	2019	Clube dos Jangadeiros	Porto Alegre	Brazil	76	21	5	76	0	
N/A	-	2021	CANCELLED DUE TO COVID								
14	27Oct -4Nov	2022	Sailing Club Val (JK Val)	Rogoznica	Croatia	76	24	5			
15	20-28 Oct	2024	Gladstone Radio Controlled Yacht Club	Gladstone, Queensland	Australia	76	20	5			
16	15-23 May	2026	Datchet Water Sailing Club	Datchet	United Kingdom	84	25	5	83	1	

== Medalists ==
Edition	Gold	Silver	Bronze	Ref.
1994, Saint-Cyr, Vienne	Graham Bantock (GBR); Own Design Red Wine	Chris Dicks (GBR); Design Metrick Magick	Mark Dicks (GBR); Design Crossbow	
1997, Wellington	Craig Smith (AUS); Design TS2	Geoff Smale (NZL); Own Design	Trevor Bamforth (NZL); Design TS2	
1999, Malta	Graham Bantock (GBR); Own Design Ikon	Craig Smith (AUS); Own Design TS-2	Martin Roberts (GBR); Design Widget	
2001, Omisalj	Martin Roberts (GBR); Design Gadget	Graham Bantock (GBR); Own Design Italiko	Gary Cameron (AUS); Design TS2	
2003, Vancouver	Trevor Binks (GBR); Design Isis	Craig Smith (AUS); Own Design TS2	Paul Jones (AUS); Design Disco	
2005, Mooloolaba	Craig Smith (AUS); Own Design Obsession	Graham Bantock (GBR); Own Design Topico	Paul Jones (AUS); Design Cockatoo	
2007, Marseille	Brad Gibson (AUS); Design Widget	Guillermo Beltri (ESP); Design Italiko	Craig Smith (AUS); Own Design Obsession	
2009, Barbados	Zvonko Jelacic (CRO); Design Pikanto	Brad Gibson (AUS); Design Widget	Mario Skrlj (CRO); Design Pikanto	
2011, West Kirby	Peter Stollery (GBR); Design BritPOP	Brad Gibson (GBR); Own Design BritPOP	Graham Elliott (GBR); Design BritPOP	
2013, Sdot Yam	Rob Walsh (GBR); Design BritPOP	Marko Matic (CRO); Design Kantun S	Søren Andresen (DNK); Design Cheinz	
2015, Foster City	Brad Gibson (GBR); Own Design POP	Peter Stollery (GBR); Design BritPOP	Zvonko Jelacic (CRO); Own Design Kantun S	
2017, Pierrelatte	Zvonko Jelacic (CRO); Own Design Kantun 2	Guillermo Beltri (ESP); Design Sedici	Rob Walsh (GBR); Design BritPOP	
2019, Porto Alegre	Zvonko Jelacic (CRO); Own Design Kantun 2	Anti Kovacevic (CRO); Design Kantun 2	Ian Vickers (NZL); Own Design V11	
2022, Rogoznica	Oliver Cohen (FRA); Design Venti	Alex Carre (FRA); Design Vickers V11	Zvonko Jelacic (CRO); Own Design Kantun 2	
2024, Gladstone	Zvonko Jelacic (CRO); Own Design Viss	Ian Vicker (NZL); Own Design V12	Alex Carre (FRA); Design Vickers V12	
2026, Datchet	Alex Carre (FRA); Design Vickers V12	Zvonko Jelacic (CRO); Own Design Viss	Rob Walsh (NZL); Design Venti	
