= Marblehead World Championship =

The International Marblehead World Championship is an bi-annual international sailing regatta of International Marblehead radio sailing yachts, organized by the host club on behalf of the International Radio Sailing Association and recognised since 1992 by World Sailing, the sports IOC recognised governing body.

== Editions ==
| Ed. | Date | | Location | | | Competitors | | | Ref. |
| Ed. | Day/Month | Year | Host club | City | Country | Boats | Nat. | Cont. | Ref. |
|---|---|---|---|---|---|---|---|---|---|
| N/A | 3-9 Aug | 1975 | Gosport Model Yacht & Boat Club | Gosport, Hampshire | United Kingdom | 49 | 9 | 4 | |
| N/A | | 1978 | | | South Africa | 35 | 6 | 4 | |
| N/A | 20-26 July | 1980 | | Ottawa, Ontario | Canada | 35 | 7 | 5 | |
| N/A | | 1982 | | | France | 30 | 9 | 2 | |
1984 not held
| N/A | | 1986 | | Fleetwood | United Kingdom | 81 | 17 | 4 | |
| N/A | | 1988 | | Berlin | Germany | 62 | | | |
| N/A | | 1990 | | Fleetwood | United Kingdom | 75 | 20 | 5 | |
| 1 | | 1992 | | | United States | 69 | | | |
1994 not held
| 2 | | 1996 | Part of Sail Melbourne Regatta | Melbourne | Australia | 48 | | | |
| 3 | | 1998 | | Viry-Châtillon | France | 79 | | | |
| 4 | | 2000 | | Los Narejos | Spain | 72 | 13 | 4 | |
| 5 | | 2002 | Adriatico Wind Club | Ravenna | Italy | 76 | 13 | 4 | |
| 6 | | 2006 | | Fleetwood | United Kingdom | 53 | 10 | 2 | |
2008 & 2010 not held
| 7 | | 2012 | | Ploërmel | France | 67 | 11 | 3 | |
| 8 | | 2014 | | Gouda | Netherlands | 69 | 12 | 3 | |
| 9 | | 2016 | | Lake Garda | Italy | 76 | 14 | 3 | |
| 10 | | 2018 | | Biblis | Germany | 76 | 12 | 2 | |
| N/A | | 2020 | West Kirby Sailing Club | West Kirby. Wirral | United Kingdom | CANCELLED DUE TO COVID 19 | | | |
| 11 | | 2023 | Club Velico Castiglionese | Castiglione del Lago | Italy | 57 | 10 | 3 | |
| 12 | | 2025 | CNHR Club Nautique; Saint Hilaire de Riez | | France | 62 | 8 | 2 | |

== Medalists ==
| year | Gold | Silver | Bronze | Ref. |
|---|---|---|---|---|
| 1975 | Lennart Akesson (SWE) | John Ball (CAN) | N. Curtis (GBR) | |
| 1978 | Barry Jackson (GBR) | Squire Kay (GBR) | Neil Bennell (AUS) | |
| 1980 | Blair Van Koughnett (CAN) | Terry Allen (USA) | Francois Foussard (FRA) | |
| 1982 | Barry Jackson (GBR) | Pierre Jahan (FRA) | Torvald Klem (NOR) | |
| 1986 | Pierre Jahan (FRA) (Own Design) | Paul Lucas (FRA); Design by P Jahan | Graham Bantock (GBR); Paradox (Own Design) | |
| 1988 | Janusz Walicki (GER) | Graham Bantock (GBR) (Own Design) | John Elmaleh (USA) | |
| 1990 | Christophe Boisnault (FRA) | Robert Wattam (NZL) | Janusz Walicki (GER) | |
| 1992 | Graham Bantock (GBR); Paradox (Own Design) | Robert Wattam (NZL); NZ Edition (Own Design) | John Elmaleh (USA); Pinter II | |
| 1994 | Janusz Walicki (GER); Skapel Mk? (Own Design) | Graham Bantock (GBR); Hush Hush (Own Design) | John Elmaleh (USA); Pinter II | |
| 1996 | Graham Bantock (GBR); Paradox (Own Design) | Torvald Klem (NOR); Berlioz | Gordon Maguire (GBR); Paradox | |
| 1998 | Graham Bantock (GBR); Rad (Own Design) | Guillermo Beltri (ESP) | Janusz Walick (GER) | |
| 2000 | Guillermo Beltri (ESP) | Graham Bantock (GBR); Rok (Own Design) | Janusz Walicki (GER); Skapel Mk? (Own Design) | |
| 2002 | Guillermo Beltri (ESP); Skapel Mk4 (Walicki) | Graham Bantock (GBR); Prime Number (Own Design) | Martin Roberts (GBR) | |
| 2006 | Martin Roberts (GBR); Starkers 2 | Ante Kovacevic (CRO); Prime Number | Zvonko_Jelacic (CRO); Rok | |
| 2012 | Brad GIBSON (GBR); Grunge (Own Design) | Graham Bantock (GBR); Prime Numbers (Own Design) | Martin ROBERTS (GBR); Starkers 2 | |
| 2014 | Brad Gibson (GBR); Grunge (Own Design) | Graham Bantock (GBR); Quark (Own Design) | Ante Kovacevic (CRO); Quark | |
| 2016 | Brad Gibson (GBR); Grunge (Own Design) | Matteo Longhi (ITA); UNKNOWN | Graham Bantock (GBR); Quark (Own Design) | |
| 2018 | Brad Gibson (GBR); Grunge (Own Design) | Christophe Boisnault (FRA); Grunge (Brad Gibson) | Peter Stollery (GBR); Up (Roger Stollery) | |
| 2020 | CANCELLED DUE TO COVID 19 | | | |
| 2023 | Patrice Montero (FRA); Grunge (Brad Gibson) | Christophe Boisnault (FRA); Expresso (Own design) | Ante Kovacevic (CRO); Grunge (Brad Gibson) | |
| 2025 | Christophe Boisnault (FRA); Expresso (Own design) | Chris Harris (GBR); Grunge (Brad Gibson) | Darin Ballington (GBR); Grunge (Brad Gibson) | |
