= Radio-controlled submarine =

Scale model of a submarine that can be steered via radio control

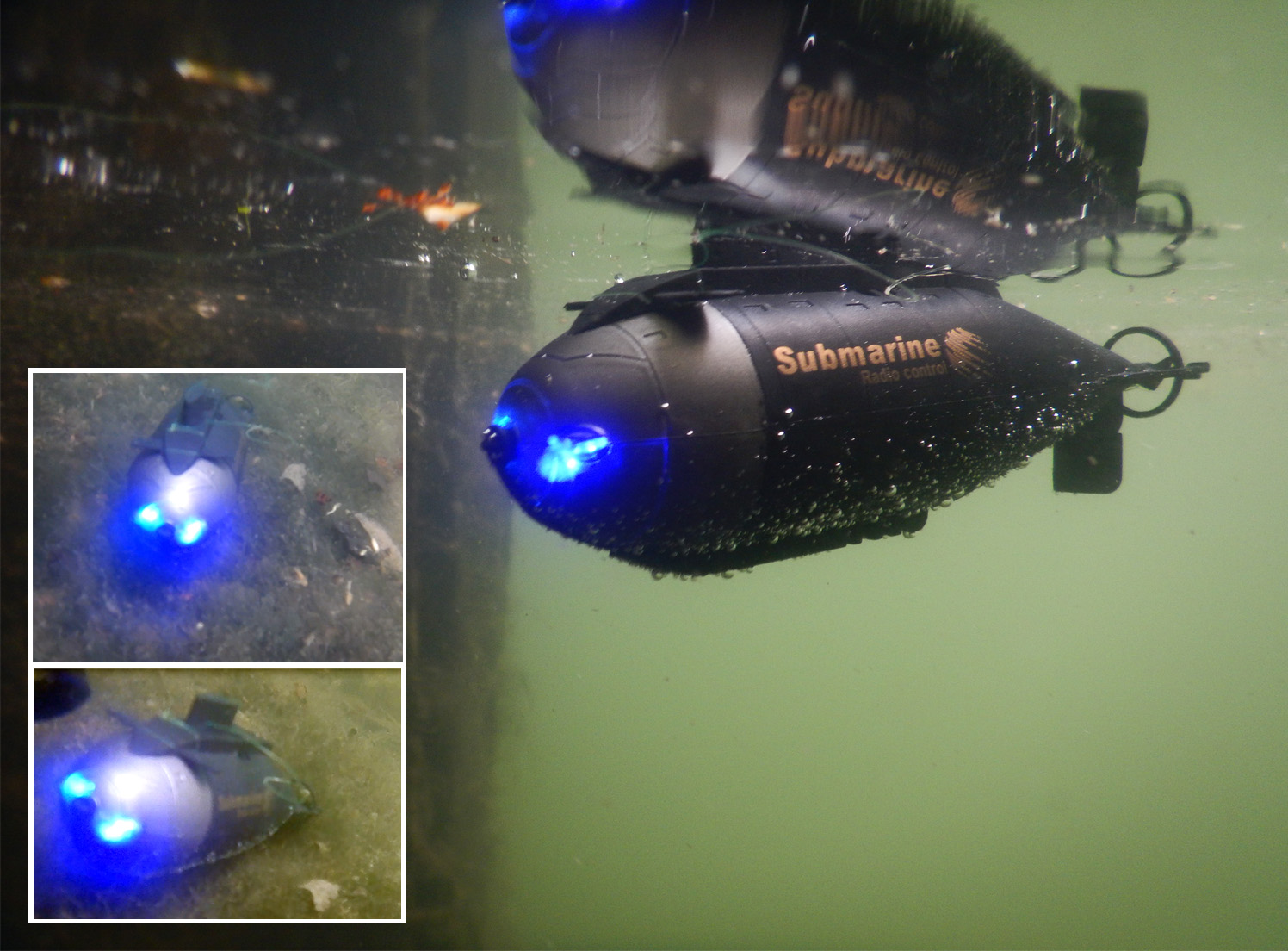
Dynamic-diving toy submarine being tested in a water tank

A radio-controlled submarine is a scale model of a submarine that can be piloted by radio control. The most common form are those that are exploited by amateurs. These can be cheap toys or complex projects using Electronics.

Oceanography and the military also operate Radio Control submarines, we then speak of a remotely operated underwater vehicle.

== Operation ==
=== Radio transmission by water ===
The more the conductivity of a medium increases, the more the radio signal that passes through it is attenuated, the more the high frequencies are attenuated and the more they tend to be reflected on the surface of the water. Thus, communication with military submarines uses very low-frequency electromagnetic radiation for this reason. Military frequencies are well below the recreational radio control bands, but the lowest recreational bands - usually around 27 Mhz/40 Mhz - can penetrate several feet of water over short distances - usually less than 50 yards. Penetration at these frequencies is best in fresh water - a lake or a swimming pool, and difficult to impossible in seawater. Modern radio controls using the 2.4 GHz band penetrate the water very poorly and are of no use for a model submariner who wishes to dive.

In order for the underwater radio to work, even at these frequencies, the receiving antenna must be completely isolated from the surrounding water. The plastic-covered wire provides adequate insulation - the antenna does not need to be kept in an airtight container - but the cut end of this wire must be sealed to prevent water penetration. Depending on the water conditions, the positive control can be maintained at a depth of about 10 feet.

Remote-controlled professional or military diving equipment can be controlled using a tether or audio signals. Very often, these equipments are equipped with on-board computers which allow autonomous operation along a determined path, so that continuous communication with the control base is not necessary. The advent of cheap small computers such as the Raspberry Pi or the Arduino has allowed scale models of submarines to imitate their professional brothers and provide autonomous control in situations where radio transmission or adequate visibility is lacking.

=== Security system ===
Since the control of submarine models is not always reliable, these models are usually equipped with a variety of devices intended to prevent the loss of models. It is possible to use fail-safe systems that detect the loss of signal and control the submarine on the surface, or pressure sensors that limit the depth reached. Such specialized complexity generally makes a reduced submarine model an expensive object compared to a reduced surface boat model.

=== Diving systems ===
==== Dynamic diving ====
These models are positively floating and remain on the surface until sufficient thrust is generated above their Rudder/Control surfaces to force them to descend underwater. Dynamic diving models are both the cheapest and the simplest, since complex buoyancy control systems are replaced by diving airplanes or thrusters. Dynamic diving models also have the advantage of being able to rise to the surface in the event of loss of radio contact, thanks to their positive buoyancy. However, as they are positively floating, these models must maintain sufficient speed underwater to stay there and are unable to stop without coming to the surface.

==== Static diving ====
These models have the ability to modify their displacement by taking or pumping water. This can be done using a piston, a pneumatic bladder or a ballast. Boats that use a ballast tank usually fill the tank by opening a vent at the top, and force the water out using compressed gas. There are variants that use water pumps for both processes. A liquid gas is dosed in the ballast tank to expel the water.

The Gas-Snort Liquid gas is used to bring the boat to the surface in an emergency, otherwise the ballast is blown by the use of a snorkel tube to the depth of the periscope and the boat is cleaned on the surface to the depth of the periscope with a full ballast.

RCABS - Recycled compressed air ballast system. Originally developed by Darnell (UK) in the 1950s, this system uses a rubber bladder as a ballast tank and this is filled with compressed air supplied by a small compressor. The air is taken from the watertight container (WTC) at the back of the dry space to inflate the bladder.

Another system that is gaining popularity is the English: Snort System. A ballast tank allows water to enter by releasing a vent valve on the top of the bottle, thus allowing the boat to submerge. To rise to the surface, a small 'Snorts' pump pumps the air from the castle of the control tower into the ballast tank, expelling the water.

== See also ==
- Remotely operated underwater vehicle
- Autonomous underwater vehicle
- Unmanned surface vehicle
