= Sun Fast 30 One Design =

Sailboat class

Development
- Designer: Van Peteghem/Lauriot-Prevost
- Location: France
- Year: 2023
- Builder: Jeanneau
- Role: Racer
- Name: Sun Fast 30 One Design

Boat
- Displacement: 5,952 lb (2,700 kg)
- Draft: 6.56 ft (2.00 m)

Hull
- Type: monohull
- Construction: Thermoplastic
- LOA: 34.12 ft (10.40 m)
- LWL: 27.56 ft (8.40 m)
- Beam: 9.81 ft (2.99 m)
- Engine: Nanni Industries 10 hp (7 kW) diesel engine/electric engine

Hull appendages
- Keel: fin keel with a weighted bulb
- Ballast: 2,205 lb (1,000 kg)
- Rudder: dual transom-mounted rudders

Rig
- Rig type: Bermuda rig

Sails
- Sailplan: 9/10 fractional rigged sloop
- Upwind sail area: 635.07 sq ft (59.000 m^{2})
- Downwind sail area: 1,474 sq ft (136.9 m^{2})

The Sun Fast 30 One Design is a 34-foot keelboat built for offshore racing. I has been built at the French Port of Nantes since 2023 by Jeanneau.

== History ==
It boat was announced in November 2022 and was based on a concept developed by the UNCL-Racing Division of the Yacht Club de France, the British Royal Ocean Racing Club, and the American Storm Trysail Club. Those clubs saw a need for a more affordable offshore one design racer that would allow national and international competition. To choose a new boat, they initiated a design competition entitled Class 30: Let's Build the Future. This was won by the design firm of VPLP design working with racing boat builder Multiplast.

== Design ==
Designed by Van Peteghem/Lauriot-Prevost, it has a 9/10 fractional sloop rig with a bowsprit. For sailing downwind it may be equipped with an asymmetrical spinnaker.

The hull has a semi-scow plumb stem, an open transom, twin transom-hung rudders controlled by a single tiller and a fixed fin keel with a weighted bulb. It displaces 5,952 lb (2,700 kg) and carries 2,205 lb (1,000 kg) of ballast. It has a draft of 6.56 ft (2.00 m) with the standard keel.

The boat is fitted with either a French Nanni Industries diesel engine of 10 hp (7 kW) or an electric motor. The fuel tank for the diesel engine installation holds 7 U.S. gallons (26 L; 5.8 imp gal). Either engine qualifies for the one design class.

The design has sleeping accommodation for five people, with a two "V"-berths in the bow cabin, a straight settee and twin seat in the main cabin and two aft cabins, each with a single berth. A navigation station is fitted on the starboard side. The head is located just aft of the bow cabin on the starboard side. Cabin headroom is 5.58 ft (170 cm).

== Construction ==
Jeanneau builds the boat and provides marketing, distribution and technical support, while Multiplast handles the design prototyping, preform and mold construction, startup of class association organization, racing program and sales oversight.

The boat is designed and constructed to be more ecologically sustainable than past boats. It is built using Elium thermoplastic resin especially for boat construction, which was developed over three years by Arkema in conjunction with Jeanneau's parent company, the Bénéteau Group. Elium is made from 20% recycled material and is 100% recyclable. This allows production waste to be reused and also means the boats themselves are recyclable.
