= Dart 18 World Championship =

Dinghy sailing regatta

The Dart 18 World Championship is an bi-annual international sailing regatta of Dart 18 catamaran, organized by the host club on behalf of the International Dart 18 Class Association and recognized by World Sailing, the sports IOC recognized governing body.

== Events ==
Ed.			Hosts			Sailor			Boats					Ref.
No	Day/Month	Year	Host club	City	Country	No.	Nat.	Cont.	Boats			Mix	Sing.	Ref.
1	14-19 Jul	1991		Abersoch	United Kingdom									
2	23-28 Jul	1995		Travemünde	Germany									
3	2-8 Jan	1998		Nouméa (New Caledonia)	France									
4	24-31 Dec	1999		Port Elizabeth	South Africa		11		105					
5	16-23 Aug	2002		Marseille	France		6+	2+	162					
6	16-23 Aug	2003	Stokes Bay Sailing Club	Stokes Bay, Hampshire	United Kingdom		10+	3+	127					
7	9-16 Jul	2004	Clube de Vela de Lagos	Lagos, Portugal	Portugal		5+	1+	87					
		2005	NOT HELD											
8	27Dec -6Jan	2005/06	East London Yacht Club	Quigney, East London	South Africa		7+	2+	72					
9	28Aug -1Sep	2007	Circolo Vela Torbole	Nago–Torbole, Lake Garda	Italy				123					
10	27Aug -1Sep	2008	Zeilvereniging Workum	Workum	Netherlands				101					
11	20-28 Nov	2009	Discover BV and Sailing Management International		Aruba				37					
12	21-27 Aug	2010	Weymouth and Portland National Sailing Academy	Isle of Portland	United Kingdom				128					
13	23-29 Jul	2011	Royal Belgium Saling Club, Duinbergen	Knokke-Heist	Belgium				83					
14	3-7 Sep	2012	Centro Velico Punta Ala	Punta Ala	Italy				93					
15	6-13 Jul	2013	Yacht Club de Carnac	Carnac	France				130					
		2014	NOT HELD											
16	27Dec -2Jan	2014/15	Stilbaai Yacht Club	Vaal Dam	South Africa				64					
17	30Jul -5Aug	2016	Regatta Center Medemblik	Medemblik	Netherlands	196	9	3	100	38	1	61	4	
18	4-11 Aug	2017	Yacht Club Scharbeutz Ostsee	Scharbeutz, Schleswig-Holstein	Germany	142	10	1	73				4	
19	21-27 Jul	2018	Centro Vela Dervio ASD	Lake Como	Italy	188	10	1	98				8	
20	16-22 Feb	2019	Royal Varuna Yacht Club	Pattaya	Thailand	102	13	5	52	28	0	24	2	
N/A	-	2020	Societe des Regates Rochelaises	La Rochelle, Charente-Maritime	France	CANCELLED due to COVID								
N/A	24-30 Jul	2021	Societe des Regates Rochelaises	La Rochelle, Charente-Maritime	France	Renamed Gold Cup due to COVID								
21		2022	Circolo Vela Arco	Lake Garda	Italy	117	7	1	59					
22	28Jul -4Aug	2023	Royal Yorkshire Yacht Club	Bridlington, East Yorkshire	United Kingdom	254	10	3	131				8	
23	6-13 Sep	2024		Tarquinia	Italy	170	8	1	88	43	4	41	6	
24	19-25 Jul	2025	Watersportvereniging Zandvoort	Zandvoort	Netherlands	130	10	4	70	35	0	35	10	

== Multiple champions ==
Compiled from the medallist table below up to and including 2024.

Ranking	Sailor	Gold	Silver	Bronze	Total	No. Entries*
1	Daniel Norman (GBR)	3	2	2	7	14
2	Fanny Merelle (FRA)	3	1	0	4	6
2	Vincent Bouvier (FRA)	3	1	0	4	7
4	Louise Roberts (GBR)	2	3	1	6	16
4	Dave Roberts (GBR)	2	3	1	6	16
6	Emmanuel Dode (FRA)	2	2	0	4	6
7	Alan Kernick (GBR)	2	0	0	2	7
7	Fiona Kernick (GBR)	2	0	0	2	7
7	Marco Tramutola (ITA)	2	0	0	2	5
7	Alessandro Siviero (ITA)	2	0	0	2	3
7	Tom Phipps (GBR)	2	0	0	2	2

- Potential Under Estimation as full results for the early years are not available.

== Medalists ==
Year	Gold	Silver	Bronze
1991; Great Britain	Great Britain; Kim Furniss; Sarah Powell	Great Britain; Gareth Owen; Steve Cottrell	France; Daniel Peponnet; Christian Carabeau
1995; Germany	Netherlands; Sven Karsenberg; Annemarie Kingma	Great Britain; Gareth Owen; Will Thompson	France; Erik Matheron; Pamela Matheron
1998; Nouméa New Caledonia	Great Britain; Gareth Owen; Christopher Delves	New Caledonia; Thierry Lebiez; Franck Caromel	Great Britain; David Lloyd; Katie Jennings
1999; South Africa	Great Britain; Jon Hutchings; Vicki Jennings	France; Hervé le Maux (FRA); Toya Al (NED)	Great Britain; Robert Garcka; Marc Howell
2002; France	France; Christophe Gazharian; Catherine Gazharian	France; Hervé le Maux (FRA); Joanna Jones-Pierce (GBR)	France; Thierry Wibaux; Christine Wibaux
2003; Great Britain	France; Vincent Bouvier; Fanny Merelle	France; Hervé le Maux (FRA); Joanna Jones-Pierce (GBR)	Great Britain; Matt Pullen; Deborah Rickard
2004; Lagos	France; Thierry Wibaux; Christine Wibaux	France; Vincent Bouvier; Fanny Merelle	Great Britain; Dave Roberts; Louise Roberts
2006; South Africa	Great Britain; Matt Pullen; Deborah Rickard	Great Britain; Gareth Owen; Angus Armstrong	Great Britain; David Lloyd; Polly Bishop
2007; Italy	Great Britain; Dan Norman; Melanie Rogers	Great Britain; David Lloyd; Cathrin Farthing	Great Britain; Paul Wakelin; Emma Curtis
2008; Netherlands	France; Emmanuel Dode; Billy Besson	Great Britain; Dan Norman; Melanie Rogers	Great Britain; David Lloyd; Cathrin Farthing
2009; Aruba	France; Emmanuel Dode; Fred Moreau	Great Britain; David Lloyd; Joanna Jones-Pierce	Germany; Mathias Huber; Dominik Volke
2010; Great Britain	Great Britain; Tom Phipps; Richard Glover	France; Emmanuel Dode; Fred Moreau	Great Britain; Dan Norman; Melanie Rogers
2011; Belgium	Great Britain; Alan Kernick; Fiona Kernick	Great Britain; Dan Norman; Melanie Rogers	France; Thierry Wibaux; Christine Wibaux
2012; Italy	Tom Phipps (GBR); Nicola Boniface (GBR)	Dave Roberts (GBR); Louise Roberts (GBR)	Thierry Wibaux (FRA); Christine Wibaux (FRA)
2013; France	Dan Norman (GBR); Jessica Day (GBR)	Jonathan Pierce (GBR); Ginny Trafford (GBR)	Brian Phipps (GBR); Katy Phipps (GBR)
2014/15; South Africa	South Africa; Alan Kernick; Fiona Kernick	South Africa; Ben Mienie; Lloyd Beyers	South Africa; Chris Clarke; Morgan Rusch
2016; Netherlands	Dan Norman (GBR); Alysha Monkman (GBR)	Dave Roberts (GBR); Louise Roberts (GBR)	Michiel Fehr (SUI); Andri Fried (SUI)
2017; Germany	Dave Roberts (GBR); Louise Roberts (GBR)	Jorg Gosche (GER); Arne Gosche (GER)	Herve LeMaux (FRA); Joanna Trafford (GBR)
2018; Italy	Alessandro Siviero (ITA); Marco Tramutola (ITA)	Michiel Fehr (SUI); Andri Fried (SUI)	David Lloyd (GBR); Anne Chaumet - LaGrange (FRA)
2019; Thailand	GBR 7835; Dave Roberts (GBR); Louise Roberts (GBR)	GBR 7930; Gareth Owen (GBR); Hebe Hemming (GBR)	GBR 7945; Daniel Norman (GBR); Alyesha Monkman (GBR)
2020; France	CANCELLED COVID 19		
2021; France	RENAMED GOLD CUP DUE TO COVID 19		
2022; Italy	ITA-6288; Alessandro Siviero (ITA); Giacomo Bozzoli Parasacchi (ITA)	FRA-7977; Hervé Le Maux (FRA); Milania Le Maux (FRA)	SUI-6708; Michiel Fehr (SUI); Andri Fried (SUI)
2023; Great Britain	FRA 8019; Vincent Bouvier (FRA); Fanny Merelle (FRA)	GBR 1013 - GP Sails; Grant Piggott (GBR); Ellamay Piggott (GBR)	GBR 8000 - Tofi; Robert Garcka (GBR); Inge-Fi Goegebeur (GBR)
2024; Italy	ITA-3882; Andrea Tramutola (ITA); Marco Tramutola (ITA)	GBR-1013 - GOLDEN OLDIE; Grant Piggott (GBR); Ella May Piggott (GBR)	GBR-7711 - Triggers Broom; David Lloyd (GBR); Jojo Trafford (GBR)
2025; Netherlands	FRA 8019; Vincent Bouvier (FRA); Fanny Merelle (FRA)	GBR 7835; Dave Roberts (GBR); Louise Roberts (GBR)	FRA 7977; Hervé Le Maux (FRA); Milania Le Maux (FRA)
