= Kingston Yacht Club =

Coordinates: 44°13′23″N 76°29′13″W

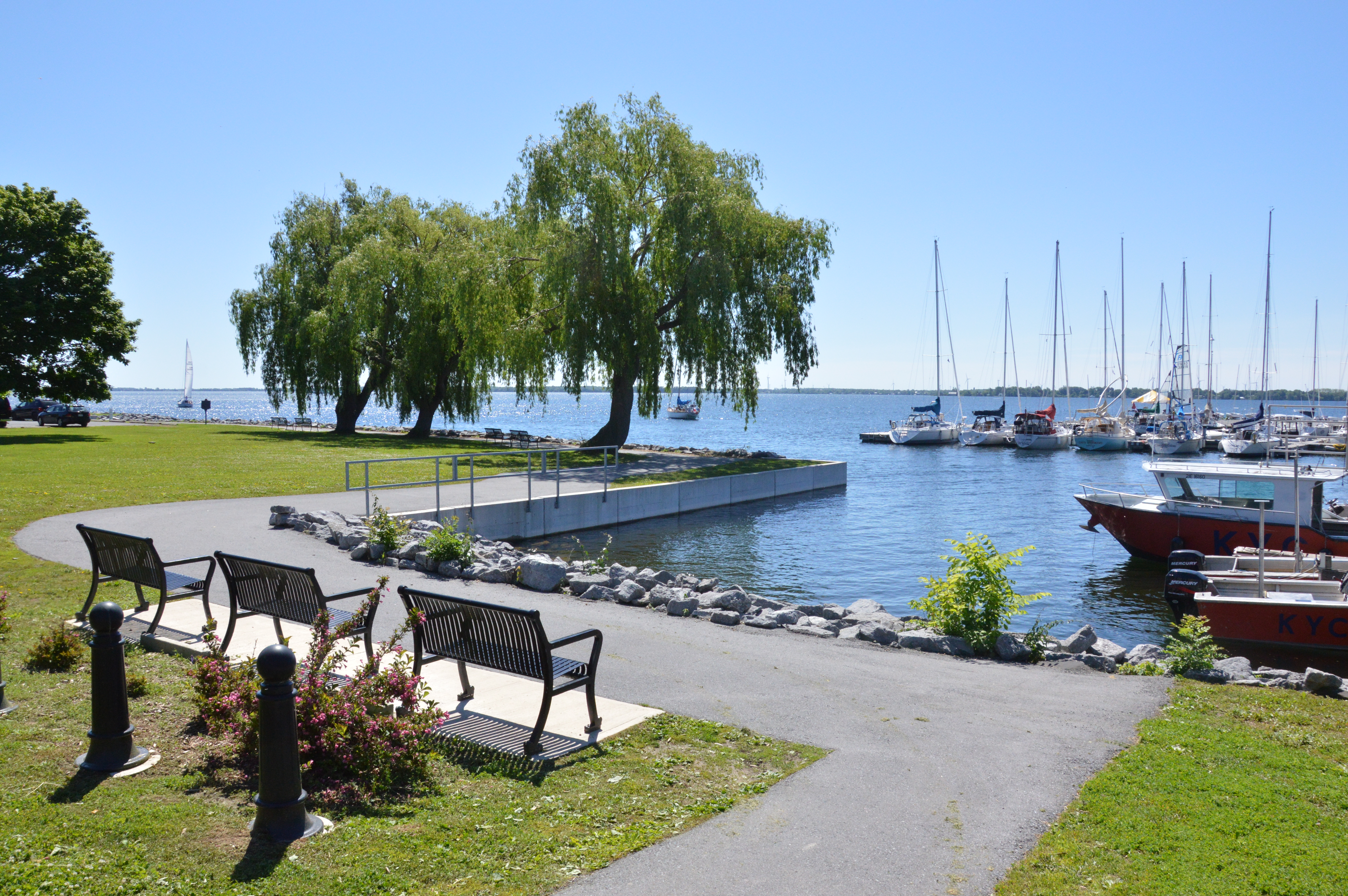
- Abbreviation: KYC
- Formation: 1896
- Legal status: active
- Location(s): 1 Maitland Street Kingston, Ontario K7L 2V3
- Official language: English, French
- Affiliations: Britannia Yacht Club, Royal Military College of Canada
- Website: www.kingstonyachtclub.com

Kingston Yacht Club (KYC) is a private yacht club based in Kingston, Ontario, Canada. The stated objectives of the club are to encourage the building and sailing of yachts, skiffs and canoes; motor boating; rowing; canoeing and all aquatic and other sports among amateurs.

== History ==
KYC was founded in 1896 from its first incarnation, the Kingston Ice Yacht Club, which was formed in 1895. Its first clubhouse building, a 40x40-foot two-story structure, was opened on August 3, 1896.

In 1906–7, Henry Patrick Smith designed a Kingston Yacht Club clubhouse at the foot of Maitland Street. The clubhouse was destroyed by fire in 1934.

The current clubhouse was erected in 1935 and officially opened by the Governor General of Canada, the Earl of Bessborough.

A firm founded by John Power designed 12 architectural drawings for Kingston Yacht Club showing elevations, floor plans, alterations and additions 1880–1953.

In 1940–41, the Royal Canadian Navy Reserves scheme for training yacht club members developed the first central registry system.

In 1991, Katherine Waugh wrote 'Setting the mark : the history of the Kingston Yacht Club.'

In 1996, Mariella C.C. Morrin edited 'Keep it simple sailor: easy cooking for people who love to eat by members of the Kingston Yacht Club.

== Regattas ==
KYC has hosted many prestigious sailing regattas over the years including dozens of world and international championships and the sailing events of the 1976 Summer Olympics.

KYC, and some of its members, were among the founders of CORK an annual multi-class sailing regatta held in the waters off Kingston, Ontario.

== Partnerships ==
As a Regional Training Centre for 2012, KYC supports the training of Athletes from the Grassroots to the National Team Level and supports the development of Coaches from Level 1 (CANSail 1&2) to Level 4–5.

The KYC has reciprocal agreements with many other yacht clubs. It is also home to the Queen's University sailing team.

== See also ==
- KYC official site
- KYC on Marinas.Com
- KYC slideshow on Flickr
- Kingston Yacht Club on YouTube
