= Vaurien =

International racing sailing class

Boat
- Crew: 2
- Draft: 0.98 m

Hull
- Hull weight: 70 kg
- LOA: 4.08 m (13.4 ft)
- Beam: 1.47 m (4 ft 10 in)

Sails
- Mainsail area: 7.6 m^{2}
- Jib/genoa area: 2.9 m^{2}
- Spinnaker area: 9.4 m^{2}

The Vaurien is a dinghy designed by Jean-Jacques Herbulot in 1951, and presented in the Boat show in Paris in 1952. It was meant as a reasonable alternative for a boat with a crew of two, as much for its low cost, as for its simplicity to sail. The first units, sold in the mentioned Boat show, had a price equivalent to two bicycles of the time. It is a light, but robust, boat that soon found its place among beginners, especially in Europe and Africa. The class has been recognised by World Sailing since 1962.

== Events ==
=== European Championship ===
| Games | Gold | Silver | Bronze |
|---|---|---|---|
| 1960 Morges (Switzerland) | France; Fabre | Switzerland; Voisin | Switzerland; Neeser |
| 1961 Ostende (Belgium) | Belgium; Maes de Baen | Belgium; Gubel; Gubel | Switzerland; Fehlmann; Fehlmann |
| 1962 Royans | Switzerland; Fehlmann; Fehlmann | Belgium; Gubel; Gubel | Switzerland; Voisin; Hug |
| 1963 Alkmaar (Netherlands) | Belgium; Maes; Tchartorysky | Netherlands; Henry; Henry | Switzerland; Voisin; Tharin |
| 1964 Palamos (Spain) | France; Quevarec; Quevarec | Switzerland; Voisin; Hug | Switzerland; Neeser; Neeser |
| 1965 Carnac (France) | France; Quevarec; Quevarec | France; Conan; Cloarec | Netherlands; Van Noort; Delange |
