= List of World Championships medalists in sailing (juniors and youth classes) =

This is a List of World Juniors and Youth Championships medalists in sailing

== World Sailing - Youth Sailing World Championships ==
See Main article Youth Sailing World Championships

== See also ==
- World championships in sailing
- World Sailing
