= One Metre =

Class of Radio Sailing Boat

International One Metre (IOM)
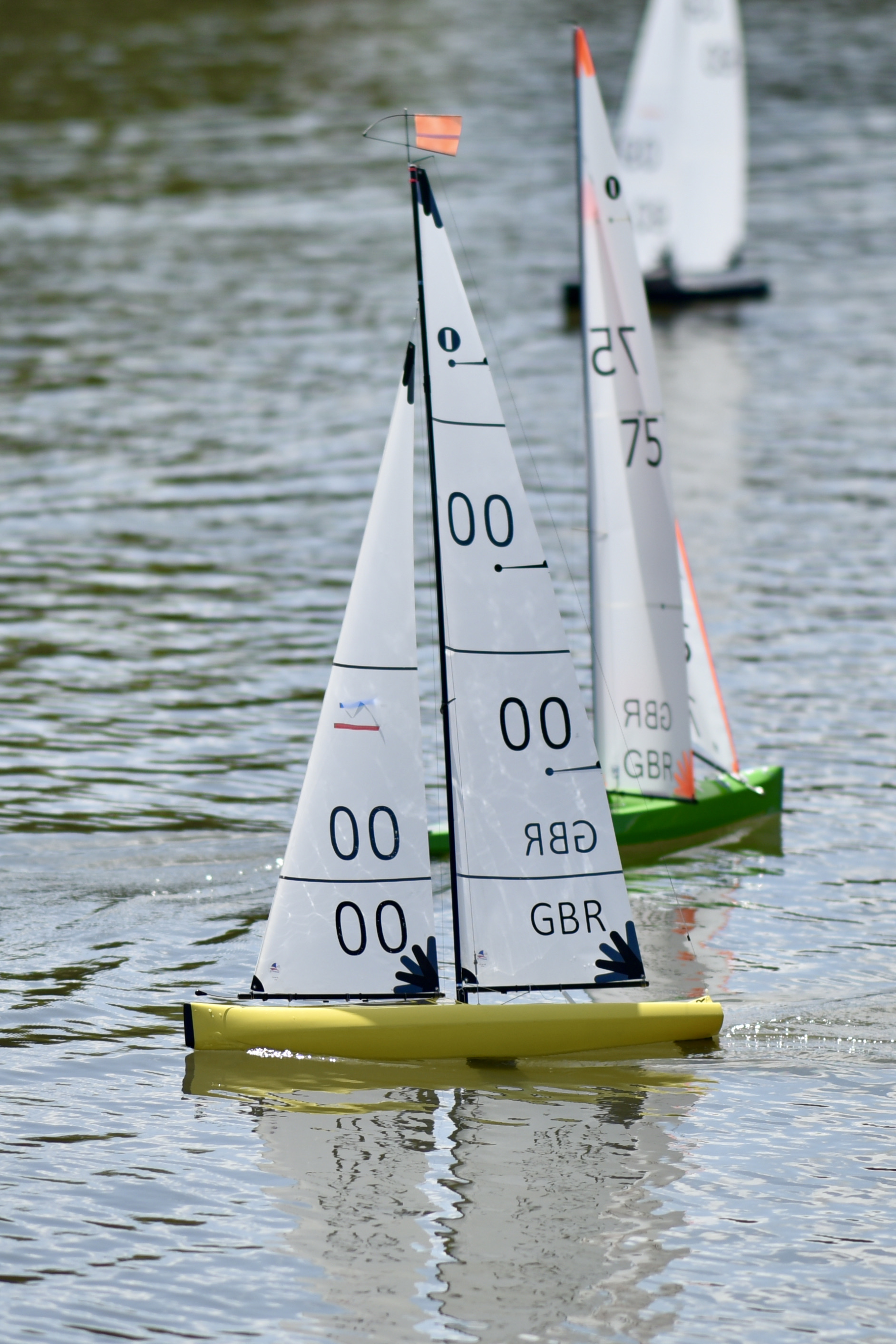
- Kantun 2 design

Development
- Designer: Various
- Year: 1988 Onwards
- No. built: +10000
- Builder: Various

Boat
- Displacement: Min 4.00 kg (8.82 lb)
- Draft: 430 mm (17 in)

Hull
- General: Monohull
- LOA: Max. 1,000 mm (39 in)
- LOH: Max. 1,000 mm (39 in)
- LWL: Max. 1,000 mm (39 in)

Hull appendages
- Keel: Bulb keel
- Ballast: Max 2.50 kg (5.5 lb)
- Rudder: Single

Rig
- Rig type: Sloop
- P mainsail luff: Rig A - 1,600 mm (63 in); Rig B - 1,180 mm (46 in); Rig C - 880 mm (35 in)
- E mainsail foot: 360 mm (14 in)
- Rig other: Alloy Spars

The International One Metre (IOM) is a class of Radio Sailing Boat used for racing under the World Sailing - Racing Rules of Sailing. It is a measurement-controlled box rule originally created by the ISAF-RSD (now the International Radio Sailing Association) in 1988 in an attempt to harmonise the various one metre rules created around the world. The IOM Class Rules specify a standardised sail plan and control of the other major performance dimensions (displacement, length, and draught) while allowing some freedom in hull design. The IOM is now the largest and arguably most competitive of all radio sailing classes.

== History ==
The International One Metre Class Association was formed in 2003 as an owners association to support the class and promote racing. This function was originally carried out by the International Radio Sailing Association (previously known as the ISAF-RSD or Radio Sailing Division). The continuing association with IRSA entitles the class to hold World Championships officially recognised by the World Sailing.

== Events ==
=== World Championship ===
See One Metre World Championship

=== Asian Championship ===
Event	Gold	Silver	Bronze
2025, Qingdao, China; 29 Boats	Zvonko Jelačić (CRO); Own Design VISS	Chen Luningning (CHN) (Continental Champion); Design K2	Yang Jiangjun (CHN); Design Venti

=== European Championship ===
Event	Gold	Silver	Bronze
1996, Fleetwood, England; 60 Boats	Graham Bantock (GBR); Own Design Redwine	Chris Dicks (GBR); Design Metrick Magick	Peter Stollery (GBR); Design Tonic
1998, Leixoes, Portugal; 53 Boats	Graham Bantock (GBR); Own Design Ikon	Piere Luigi Puthod (ITA); Design Scoop	Paul Jones (AUS); Design Mirage
2000, Saint-Cyr, France; 74 Boats	Martin Roberts (GBR); Design Widget	Guillermo Beltri (ESP); Design Ikon	Graham Bantock (GBR); Own Design Italiko
2002, Fleetwood, England; 80 Boats	Martin Roberts (GBR); Design Widget	Graham Elliott (GBR); Design Ericca	Trevor Bamforth (GBR); Own Design Stealth
2004, Arcos de la Frontera, Spain; 82 Boats	Graham Bantock (GBR); Own Design Topiko	Peter Stollery (GBR); Design Isotonic	Franco Borin (ITA); Design Ikon
2006	NOT HELD		
2008, Dubrovnik, Croatia; 70 Boats	Guillermo Beltri (ESP); Design Pikanto	Ante Kovacevic (CRO); Design Pikanto	Mario Skrlj (CRO); Design Topiko
2010, Pierrelatte, France; 70 Boats	Marko Matic (CRO); Design Pikanto	Brad Gibson (GBR); Own Design BritPOP!	Zvonko Jelacic (CRO); Design Pikanto
2012, Cres, Croatia; 76 Boats	Brad Gibson (GBR); Own Design BritPOP!	Zvonko Jelacic (CRO); Own Design Kantun	Graham Elliott (GBR); Design BritPOP!
2014, Campione del Garda; 76 Boats	Brad Gibson (GBR); Own Design POP	Juan Marcos Egea (ESP); Design BritPOP!	Oliver Cohen (FRA); Design BritPOP!
2016, Vitoria, Spain; 76 Boats	Brad Gibson (GBR); Own Design POP	Rob Walsh (GBR); Design BritPOP	Alexis Carre (GBR); Design BritPOP
2018, Rogoznica, Croatia76 Boats	Zvonko Jelacic (CRO); Own Design Kantun 2	Ante Kovacevic (CRO); Design Kantun 2	Rob Walsh (GBR); Design BritPOP
2023, Torrevieja, Spain; 80 Boats	Zvonko Jelačić'CRO (25x17px); Own Design VISS	Alexis Carré (FRA); Design V11	Guillermo Beltri (ESP); Design Venti
2025, Rogoznica, Croatia; 98 Boats	Robert Matulja (CRO); Design K2	Jan Springer (POL); Design Venti	Robert Walsh (GBR); Design Venti

=== North American Championship ===
Event	Gold	Silver	Bronze
2023, Hobe Sound, Florida; 66 Boats	Zvonko Jelačić (CRO); Own Design K2	Ian Vickers (NZL); Own Design V12	Ken Read (USA) (Continental Champion); Design K2

=== Oceania Championship ===
Event	Gold	Silver	Bronze
2025, Lake Pegasus, Canterbury; 66 Boats	Paul Jones (AUS); Design vENTI	Ian Vickers (NZL) (Continental Champion); Own Design V12	Guillermo Beltrí (ESP); DesignGC24

=== South American Championship ===
Event	Gold	Silver	Bronze
2023, Lake Rupanco, Chile; 36 Boats	Zvonko Jelačić (CRO); Own Design K2	Guillermo Beltrí (ESP); Design Venti	Pablo Walper (CHI) (Continental Champion); Design Venti
