= Hobie Dragoon =

Sailboat class

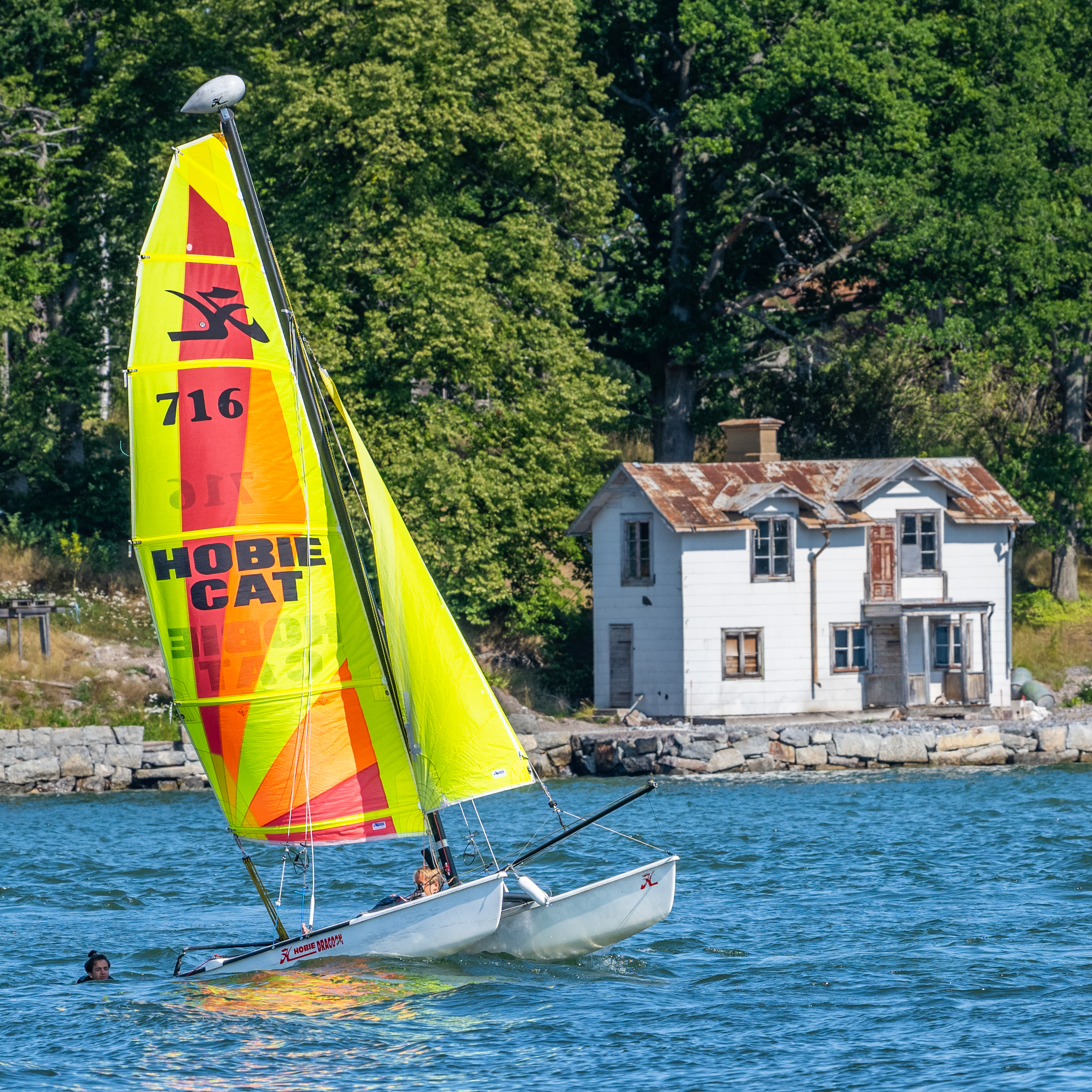
- Hobie Cat NZ7 0538

Development
- Designer: Hobie Cat Europe
- Year: 2001
- Builder: Hobie Cat Europe
- Name: Hobie Dragoon

Boat
- Crew: 2

Hull
- Hull weight: Boat Weight 98 kg
- LOH: 3.9 m (13 ft)
- Beam: 2.2 m (7 ft 3 in)

Rig
- Mast height: 6.4 m (21 ft)

Sails
- Spinnaker area: 10.31 m^{2} (111.0 sq ft)
- Total sail area: 118 sq ft (11.0 m^{2})

The Hobie Dragoon was designed by Hobie Cat Europe as a youth trainer for boat racing. The target age is 12 to 14 years. The Dragoon has a twin trapeze and spinnaker option. The class has International Sailing Federation Class status.

== World Championships ==
Year	Gold	Silver	Bronze
2004	Richard Glover (GBR); Andrew Glover (GBR)		
2006	Jason Waterhouse (GBR); Chase Lurati (GBR)		
2008	Matthew Whitehead (GBR); Megan DU PLESSIS (GBR)		
2013	Tom HEINRICH (GER); Lea Selin ZISLER (GER)	Brandon WIJTENBURG (RSA); Todd FISHER (RSA)	Lukas VERMEULEN (BEL); Alexander VAN GROTENHUIS (BEL)
