= RS500 World Championship =

Sailing World Championship in the RS500

The RS500 World Championship was an annual international sailing regatta of RS500 two person dinghy, organized by the host club on behalf of the International RS500 Class Association and recognized by World Sailing, the sports IOC recognized governing body. The event was held from 2010 to 2025 while the class held status with World Sailing.ún

== Events ==
Ed.	Date		Host			Sailors			Boats				Ref.
Ed.	Day/Month	Year	Host club	Location	Nat.	Tot	Nat	Con	Boat			Mix	Ref.
1	15–20 August	2010		Bruinisse	Netherlands	44	5	2	22	13	2	7	
2	15–21 August	2011	Weymouth and Portland National Sailing Academy	Isle of Portland	United Kingdom |	108	8	3	54	24	6	24	
3	23–27 July	2012	Fraglia Vela Riva	Lake Garda	Italy	72	6	2	36	19	3	12	
4	5–9 August	2013	Segelsällskapet Kaparen	Onsala	Sweden	70	6	2	35	18	3	14	
5	19–23 August	2014	CN Loctudy	Loctudy	France	102	5	1	51	24	4	23	
6	2–6 August	2015		Bruinisse	Netherlands	128	8	1	64	35	5	24	
7	25–29 July	2016	Travemunder Woche	Travemunder	Germany	86	8	1	43	17	3	23	
8	24–28 July	2017	Centro Vela Alto Lario	Gravedona, Lake Como	Italy	124	9	1	62	34	9	19	
9	21–25 August	2018	Weymouth and Portland National Sailing Academy	Isle of Portland	United Kingdom	100	9	2	50	22	4	24	
10	5–9 August	2019		Lake Lipno	Czech Republic	120	10	2	60	33	4	23	
N/A		2020		Travemunde	Germany	CANCELLED COVID							
11	2–6 August	2021		Lake Como	Italy	116	7	1	58	28	6	24	
12	30 July: 5 Aug	2022	Weymouth and Portland National Sailing Academy	Isle of Portland	United Kingdom	68	6	1	34	19	2	13	
13		2023	Yacht Club Nechranice	Nechranice	Czech Republic	88	8	1	44	22	7	15	
14		2024		Bruinisse	Netherlands	116	10	1	58	29	7	22	
15		2025	Lega Navale Italiana Follonica	Follonica	Italy	82	6	1	41	23	5	13	
		2026	NO LONGER HELD										

== Multiple World Champions ==
Ranking	Sailor	Gold	Silver	Bronze	Total	No. Entries
1	Tim Wilkins (GBR)	4	2	1	7	8
1	Heather Martin (GBR)	4	2	1	7	8
3	Pim Van Vugt (NED)	3	0	0	3	4
3	Lisa Van Vugt (NED)	3	0	0	3	4

== Medalists ==
Year	Gold	Silver	Bronze	Ref.
2010	Tim Wilkins (GBR); Heather Martin (GBR)	Alex Taylor (GBR); Bryan Mobbs (GBR)	Berend Hilterman (NED); Max Blom (NED)	
2011	Alex Taylor (GBR); Bryan Mobbs (GBR)	Tim Wilkins (GBR); Heather Martin (GBR)	Barend Hiltermann (NED); Max Blom (NED)	
2012	Tim Wilkins (GBR); Heather Martin (GBR)	Carolyn Howe (USA); Mischa Heemskerk (NED)	Gregory Bartlett (GBR); Paul Bartlett (GBR)	
2013	Karin Söderström (SWE); Ingrid Soderstrom (SWE)	Peter Barton (GBR); Heather Chipperfield (GBR)	Tim Wilkins (GBR); Heather Martin (GBR)	
2014	Tim Wilkins (GBR); Heather Martin (GBR)	Mike Saul (GBR); Meg Fletcher (GBR)	Peter Barton (GBR); Heather Chipperfield (GBR)	
2015	Peter Barton (GBR); Heather Chipperfield (GBR)	Malin Broberg (SWE); Johan Rook (SWE)	Peter Curtis (GBR); James Curtis (GBR)	
2016	Pim van Vugt (NED); Lisa van Vugt (NED)	Martin Johansson (SWE); Axel Johansson (SWE)	Federico Maccari (ITA); Stefano Costini (ITA)	
2017	Federico Maria Maccari (ITA); Filippo Maccari (ITA)	Francesco Bozano Gandolfo (ITA); Andrea Dellepiane (ITA)	Martin Johansson (SWE); Axel Johansson (SWE)	
2018	Pim van Vugt (NED); Lisa van Vugt (NED)	Stephen Cockerill (GBR); Sarah Cockerill (GBR)	Nicolas Honor (FRA); Thomas Honor (FRA)	
2019	Peter Curtis (GBR); James Curtis (GBR)	Jacopo Roncuzzi (ITA); Federico Roncuzzi (ITA)	Jakub Dobry (CZE); Tereza Dobra (CZE)	
2020	Cancelled due to COVID-19			
2021	Jakub Dobry (CZE); Tereza Dobra (CZE)	Hylke Kooistra (NED); Thomas Holewijn (NED)	Jesper Overbeeke (NED); Merle Meinhardt (NED)	
2022	GBR 625; Tim Wilkins (GBR); Heather Wilkins (GBR)	GBR 1040; Edd Whitehead (GBR); Ian Mairs (GBR)	GBR 1746; Hugh Watson (GBR); Luke Watson (GBR)	
2023	GBR 1756; Stephen Cockerill (GBR); Sarah Cockerill (GBR)	GBR 1681; Peter Curtis (GBR); James Curtis (GBR)	GBR 1746; Hugh Watson (GBR); Luke Watson (GBR)	
2024	NED 819; Pim van Vugt (NED); Lisa van Vugt (NED)	GBR 920; Tim Wilkins (GBR); Heather Wilkins (GBR)	GBR 529; Paul Cullen (GBR); Fresh Abendstern (GBR)	
2025	Gabriele Corsi (ITA); Giulia Galletti (ITA)	Tim Wilkins (GBR); Fresh Abendstern (GBR)	Iacopo Roncuzzi (ITA); Federico Roncuzzi (ITA)	
