= Shark 24 World Championship =

The Shark World Championship is an sailing regatta for the Shark 24 class. The title has been officially recognised by World Sailing since year 2000 but has it origions dating back since 1966 so over 60 years. The regatta follows a three-year rotation where for two consecutive years the regatta is hosted by the Canadian Shark Class Association in Canada, and the third year it is held in Europe in Austria, Germany, or Switzerland.

== Editions ==
Edition			Hosts			Boats	Sailors					Ref
No.	Date	Year	Host club	Location	Nat.	Boats	No.			Nat.	Cont.	Ref
37	5-9 Aug	2002	Mimico Cruising Club	Etobicoke	Canada	68	74			4	2	
38	19-24 Jul	2003	Britannia Yacht Club	Ottawa	Canada	50				5+	2+	
39	19-26 Jun	2004	Robeler Segler-Verein	Röbel / Müritz, Mecklenburg-Vorpommern	Germany	56	168	134	34	4	2	
40	-	2005	South Port Sailing Club	Tecumseh	Canada							
41	23-28 Jul	2006	Royal Canadian Yacht Club, Toronto Island	Toronto, Ontario	Canada	52	156			4	2	
42	-	2007	Segelclub Ebensee	Ebensee am Traunsee	Austria	47	142			4	2	
43	3-8 Aug	2008	Royal Hamilton Yacht Club	Hamilton	Canada	38	144			3	2	
44	22-28 Aug	2009	Niagara-on-the-Lake Sailing Club	Niagara-on-the-Lake	Canada	63	69			5	2	
45	11-16 May	2010	Yacht Club Kreuzlingen	Kreuzlingen, Thurgau	Switzerland	30	90	72	18	4	2	
46	6Nov -17Jun	2011	Beaconsfield Yacht Club	0	Canada	54	163			5	2	
47	25-31 Aug	2012	Kingston Yacht Club	Kingston	Canada	56	169			3	2	
48	29Sep -3Oct	2013	Robeler Segler-Verein	Röbel / Müritz, Mecklenburg-Vorpommern	Germany	46	138			4	2	
49	25-30 Aug	2014	The National Yacht Club, Canada	Toronto, Ontario	Canada							
50	22-28 Aug	2015	Britannia Yacht Club	Ottawa	Canada	39	117	89	28	4	2	
51	5-10 May	2016	SC Ebensee, Austria		Austria	52	153			5	2	
52	14-20 Jul	2017	Royal Canadian Yacht Club, Toronto Island	Toronto, Ontario	Canada	47	126			4	2	
53	-	2018	Kingston Yacht Club	Kingston	Canada	33	102			3	2	
54	-	2019	Robeler Segler-Verein	Röbel / Müritz, Mecklenburg-Vorpommern	Germany	48	146	131	18	5	2	
N/A	-	2020	Pointe Claire Yacht Club	Pointe-Claire, Quebec	Canada	COVID						
N/A	-	2021	Niagara-on-the-Lake Sailing Club	Niagara-on-the-Lake	Canada	COVID						
55	13-18 Sep	2022	Yacht Club Bregenz	Bregenz	Austria	42	128			5	2	
56	18-25 Aug	2023	Niagara-on-the-Lake Sailing Club	Niagara-on-the-Lake	Canada	48	151			4	2	
57	7-13 Sep	2024	Whitby Yacht Club	Whitby	Canada	42	127			4	2	
58	10-16 May	2025	Segelclub Altmünster	Altmünster	Austria	38	114	96	18	4	2	
59	27Jun -2Jul	2026	Bay of Quinte Yacht Club	Belleville	Canada	48	146	116	30	4	2	

== Medalists ==
year	Gold	Silver	Bronze
1966 Ottawa	Canada; Sid Dakin		
1967 Montreal	Canada; Sid Dakin		
1968 Niagara-on-the-Lake	Canada; Sid Dakin		
1969 Toronto	Canada; Sid Dakin		Canada; Roy Brown
1970 Ottawa	Canada; Sid Dakin		
1971 Mississauga	Canada; Jim Jackson		
1972 Kingston	West Germany; Horst Shaunbacher		
1973 Montreal	Canada; John Fitzpatrick		
1974 Sandhamn	West Germany; Horst Shaunbacher		
1975 Fort Erie	Canada; John Fitzpatrick		
1976	Sweden; Eric Schauman		
1977 Travemünde	West Germany; Helmut Jungbut		
1978 Mississauga	Canada; Clare Norris		
1979 Toronto	Canada; Don Walton		
1980	West Germany; Rudi Magg		
1981 Mississauga	Canada; Ralph Gilbert		
1982 Hamilton	Canada; Paul Davis		
1983 Attersee	Austria; Anton Stader		
1984 Fort Erie	Canada; Hal Ebert; Mike Entwistle; Sandy Ebert		
1985 Toronto	Canada; Dana Richardson; Peter Eagar; Mo Regnier		
1986 Konstanz	Austria; Flossi Felsecker		
1987 Niagara-on-the-Lake	Canada; Hal Ebert; Mike Entwistle; Sandy Ebert		
1988 Fort Erie	Canada; Hal Ebert; Mike Entwistle; Sandy Ebert		
1989 Attersee	Austria; Flossi Felsecker		
1990 Kingston	Canada; Peter Schell		
1991 Toronto	Canada; Peter Vickery; David Starck; Jamie Day		
1992 Kreuzlingen	Austria; Flossi Felsecker		
1993 Oakville	Canada; Greg Cockburn; Peter Eagar; Christine Forsyth		
1994 Niagara-on-the-Lake	Canada; Don Ruddy		
1995 Friedrichshaven	Canada; Don Ruddy		
1996 Kingston	Canada; Jeff Mitchell; Peter Aker; Robert McCooey	Canada; Graham Jones; Tof Nicoll-Griffith; Luis Carrasco	Canada; Jack Mitchell; Chris Daniels; Ken Mitchell
1997 Fort Erie	Canada; Don Ruddy	Canada; Jack Mitchell; Chris Daniels; Ken Mitchell	Canada; Jeff Mitchell; Peter Aker; Robert McCooey
1998 Breitenbrunn	Canada; Don Ruddy; John Clark; Kathy Ruddy	Austria; Flossi Felsecker; Franz Lackerbauer; Johannes Tinsobin	Austria; Franz Flasch; Franz Gratzel; Doris Potsch
1999 Toronto	Canada; Sid Dakin; John Dakin; Julian Aziz	Canada; Jack Mitchell; Chris Daniels; Ken Mitchell	Canada; Mark Wiggins
2000 Parry Sound	Canada; Don Ruddy; John Clark; Martin Shaw	Canada; Sid Dakin; John Dakin; Julian Aziz	Canada; Jeff Mitchell; Andrew Shaw; Peter Aker
2001 Kreuzlingen	Canada; Don Ruddy; John Clark	Austria; Flossi Felsecker	Canada; Rodney Smith
2002 Toronto	Canada; Greg Cockburn; Peter Eagar; Christine Forsyth	Canada; Steve Elwood	Canada; Michael Lee
2003 Ottawa	Canada; Greg Cockburn; Peter Eagar; Christine Forsyth	Canada; Sid Dakin; John Dakin; Julian Aziz	Canada; Don Ruddy; John Clark
2004 Müritz	Canada; John Clark; John Fraser; Ethier Annie Claude	Germany; Jürgen Ahlfeldt; Jürgen Borgwardt; Dieter Dülffer	Austria; Michael Schahpar; Elfriede Schahpar; Peter Feichtinger
2005 Windsor	Canada; Johan Koppernaes; Doug Brown; Michael Lee	Canada; Sid Dakin; John Dakin; Kyle Dakin	Canada; Paul Davis; Peter van Rossem; Nathan Baron
2006 Toronto	Canada; Johan Koppernaes; Doug Brown; Michael Lee	Canada; Stephen Jones; Lisa Katz Jones; Kathryn Fuller	Canada; Jeremy Lucas; Chris Dorrington; Graham Eisenhauer
2007 Traunsee	Germany; Horst Rudorffer; Anita Correll; Thomas Molz	Canada; Johan Koppernaes; Doug Brown; Michael Lee	Austria; Michael Schahpar; Florian Leitner; Elfriede Schahpar
2008 Hamilton	Canada; David Foy; Jamie Foy; David O'Sullivan	Canada; Johan Koppernaes; Doug Brown; Michael Lee	Canada; John Dakin; Kyle Dakin; Morgan Dakin
2009 Niagara-on-the-Lake	Canada; David Foy; Jamie Foy; David O'Sullivan	Canada; Josh Wiwcharyk; Chris Clarke; Martha Rafuse	Canada; Johan Koppernaes; Doug Brown; Michael Lee
2010 Kreuzlingen	Canada; Greg Cockburn; Hal Ebert; Peter Aker	Canada; David Foy; Jamie Foy; David O'Sullivan	Austria; Ernst Felsecker; Klaus Kratochwill; Franz Gratzel
2011 Montreal	Canada; David Foy; Jamie Foy; David O'Sullivan	Canada; Johan Koppernaes; Doug Brown; Michael Lee	Canada; George Stedman; Etienne Portelance; Robert Levy
2012 Kingston	Canada; Robert Davis; Paul Davis; Brandon Tattersall	Canada; Peter Aker; Howard Moscrop; David Giles	Canada; Johan Koppernaes; Doug Brown; Michael Lee
2013 Muritz	Canada; Keven Piper; Tom Nelson; Jordin Clark	Austria; Michael Schahpar; Bernhard Hynie; Nancy Harvey; Douglas Mc Farlane	Canada; Greg Cockburn; Hal Ebert; Peter Aker
2014 Toronto	Canada; Keven Piper; Tom Nelson; Jordin Clark	Canada; Peter Van Rossem; Peter Van Rossem Jr; Stan Wallace	Canada; Andrew Morgan; Daina Morgan; Martin Shaw
2015 Ottawa	Canada; Dave Foy; Jamie Foy; David O'Sullivan	Canada; John Dakin; Morgan Dakin; Trevor Dakin	Canada; Peter Van Rossem; Stan Wallace; Peter Jr. Van Rossem
2016 Ebensee	Austria; Michael Schahpar; Klaus Kratochwill; Ben Hynie	Canada; Keven Piper; Tom Nelson; Jordin Clark	Austria; Christan Binder; Thomas Czajka; Harald Hynie
2017 Toronto	Canada; Richard Robarts; Colin Clark; Cameron Mason	Canada; Greg Cockburn; Andrew Barlow; Sean Grayson	Canada; Jeffrey Gillmeister; Martha Henderson; Paul Henderson
2018 Kingston	Canada; Stephen Jones; Geoff Moore; Breck McFarlane	Canada; Martin Shaw; Andrew Morgan; Daina Morgan	Canada; Peter Van Rossem; Stan Wallace; Matt Fair
2019 Muritz	Austria; Christian Binder; Harald Hynie; Thomas Czajka	Canada; Peter Van Rossem; Matthew Fair; James Fair	Austria; Michael Schahpar; Ben Hynie; Klaus Kratochwill
2020 Montreal	COVID		
2021	COVID		
2022 Bregenz	AUT-1449; Christian Binder (AUT); Thomas Czajka (AUT); Stefan Watamaniuk (AUT)	Canada; Peter Van Rossem; Matthew Fair; Stan Wallace	CAN-176
2023 Niagara on the Lake	CAN 1767 - Crunch; Josh Wiwcharyk (CAN); Chris Clarke (CAN); Alex Letchford (CAN)	CAN 1012 - Rampant; Levi Harper (CAN); Jacob Harper (CAN); Malcolm Harper (CAN)	CAN 165 - Rocket Appliance; Dave Castle (CAN); Dane Broe (CAN); Jessica Broe-Vayda (CAN)
2024 Whitby	NOT TITLE AWARDED (INSUFFICIENT RACES)		
2025 Altmünster	AUT 1449; Christian Binder (AUT); Thomas Czajka (AUT); Stefan Watamaniuk (AUT)	AUT 1807; Michael Schahpar (AUT); Bernhard Hynie (AUT); Klaus Kratochwill (AUT)	CAN 276; Peter Van Rossem (CAN); Josh Wilby (CAN); Matt Fair (CAN)|-
2026 Belleville	CAN 276 Jonathan Livingston Seagull; Peter Van Rossem (CAN); Matthew Fair (CAN); Josh Wilby (CAN)	CAN 1767 Crunch; Josh Wiwcharyk (CAN); Alex Letchford (CAN); Chris Clarke (CAN)	CAN 441 Gartner; Martha Henderson (CAN); Jennifer Provan (CAN); Jeffrey Gillmeister (CAN)
