= Quigney, South Africa =

Quigney
- Location within Eastern Cape Location within South Africa
- Coordinates: 33.016°S 27.915°E
- Country: South Africa
- Province: Eastern Cape
- Municipality: Buffalo City
- Main Place: East London

Area
  - Total: 2.01 km^{2} (0.78 sq mi)

Population (2011)
  - Total: 11,258
  - Density: 5,600/km^{2} (14,500/sq mi)

Racial makeup (2011)
  - Black African: 75.3%
  - Coloured: 5.3%
  - Indian/Asian: 3.0%
  - White: 15.2%
  - Other: 1.2%

First languages (2011)
  - Xhosa: 54.1%
  - English: 26.2%
  - Afrikaans: 10.0%
  - Southern Ndebele: 1.2%
  - Other: 8.5%
- Time zone: UTC+2 (SAST)
- Postal code (street): 5201
- PO box: 5211

Quigney is a seaside suburb of East London in South Africa.

It got its name from the "Gwygney River" according to the earliest maps of East London from September 1847 by William Jervois. The municipality started to sell plots "east of the Quigney River" after 1883.
