= Rogoznica =

- Village
- Općina Rogoznica; Municipality of Rogoznica
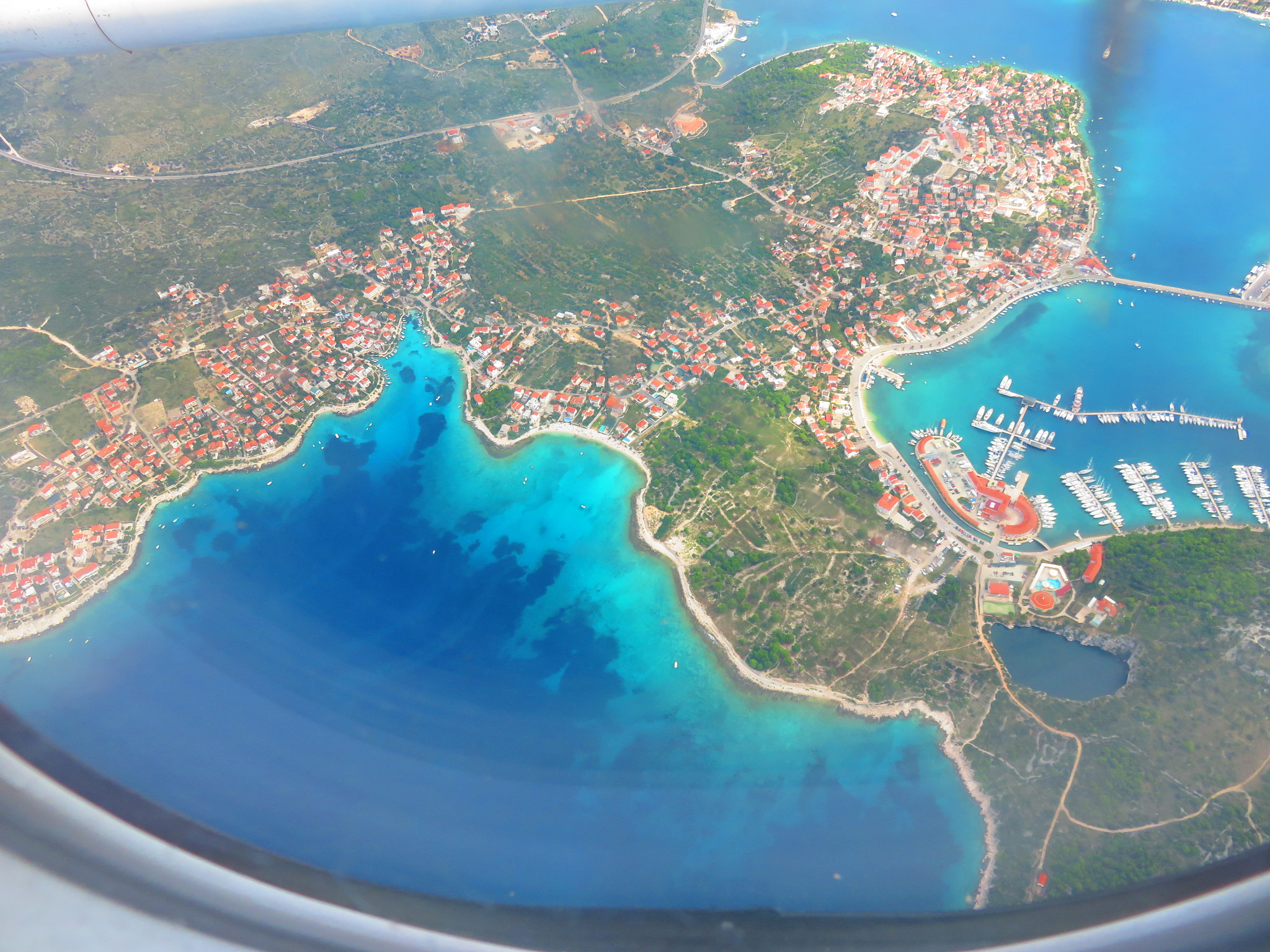
- Rogoznica seen from airplane
- Interactive map of Rogoznica
- Location within Croatia
- Coordinates: 43°32′00″N 15°58′10″E
- Country: Croatia
- Region: Dalmatia
- County: Šibenik-Knin County

Government
  - Mayor: Anita Živković (HDZ)

Area
  - Village: 68.1 km^{2} (26.3 sq mi)
  - Urban: 2.5 km^{2} (0.97 sq mi)

Population (2021)
  - Village: 2,106
  - Density: 30.9/km^{2} (80.1/sq mi)
  - Urban: 960
  - Urban density: 380/km^{2} (990/sq mi)
- Time zone: UTC+1 (CET)
  - Summer (DST): UTC+2 (CEST)
- Postal code: 22203 Rogoznica
- Website: rogoznica.hr

Rogoznica

Dragon's Eye lake

Rogoznica is a municipality and a village on the Dalmatian coast in Croatia. It lies in the southernmost part of the Šibenik-Knin County, in a deep bay sheltered from wind, about 30 km from Šibenik.

It is occasionally called Šibenska Rogoznica to distinguish it from Lokva Rogoznica, another tourist resort in Dalmatia.

== Population ==
In 2021, the municipality had 2,106 residents in the following 13 settlements:

- Dvornica, population 117
- Jarebinjak, population 10
- Kanica, population 108
- Ložnice, population 19
- Oglavci, population 7
- Podglavica, population 252
- Podorljak, population 125
- Ražanj, population 131
- Rogoznica, population 960
- Sapina Doca, population 34
- Stivašnica, population 54
- Zatoglav, population 55
- Zečevo Rogozničko, population 234
Rogoznica: Population trends 1857–2021
v

population	2079	2044	2537	2835	3126	3408	2603	2570	3398	3545	3348	2864	2318	2138	2391	2345	2106
	1857	1869	1880	1890	1900	1910	1921	1931	1948	1953	1961	1971	1981	1991	2001	2011	2021

Sources: Croatian Bureau of Statistics publications

In the 2011 census, 96% of people declared themselves Croats.

== History ==
The part of Rogoznica that lies on the mainland was populated already in 1390. In 1518 the inhabitants fled in front of the Turkish army to safety of the nearby islet.

== Climate ==
The warmest months are July and August when the air temperature is between 25 and 35 °C (77 and 95 °F) and the sea temperature reaches up to 28 °C (82 °F). Rain is rare.

== Notable people ==
- Rahim Ademi, a Croatian general during the Homeland War, was stationed in Rogoznica for a time.
