= RS500 =

Type of sailboat

Development
- Designer: Phil Morrison

Boat
- Crew: 2
- Trapeze: Yes

Hull
- Type: Monohull
- Construction: GRP composite
- Hull weight: 192 lb (87 kg)
- LOA: 14 ft 3 in (4.34 m)
- Beam: 5 ft 2 in (1.57 m)

Hull appendages
- Keel: Centreboard

Rig
- Rig type: Aluminium alloy

Sails
- Mainsail area: S rig - 80 sq ft (7.4 m^{2}); XL rig - 100 sq ft (9.3 m^{2})
- Jib/genoa area: S rig - 31 sq ft (2.9 m^{2}); XL rig - 37 sq ft (3.4 m^{2})
- Spinnaker area: S rig - 145 sq ft (13.5 m^{2}); XL rig - 145 sq ft (13.5 m^{2})

Rating
- RYA PN: 972

The RS500 is a double handed trapeze skiff designed by Phil Morrison, manufactured and designed by RS Sailing. The class has a PY number of 972. There are two sail size options (the S and XL rig) and makes the RS500 suitable for youngsters and adults. With ISAF Recognised Status, the RS500 has a racing circuit with events in the UK, Europe and the World Championships.

== Performance and design ==
The cockpit is uncluttered and the low transom design makes climbing aboard after capsize easy and a pivoting centreboard and rudder make launch and recovery safe.

== International success and awards ==
- The RS500 was a world sailing class from November 2009 to November 2025 when it withdraw it status.
- The RS500 has won the 'Sailboat of the Year' Award twice

== Events ==
=== World Championships ===
The RS500 World Championship was held from 2010 to 2025 with participants from 16 countries. There was a stong European presence with (Netherlands) (United Kingdom) (Czech Republic) (Italy) (France) (Belgium) (Russia) (Slovakia) (Sweden) (Estonia) (Hong Kong) (Germany) (Spain) in addition to Oceania with (Australia) and Asia with (Hong Kong) and North America (United States) during the running of the event.

=== EuroCup-Series ===
In 2017 the first EuroCup-Serie was held.

Year	Locations	1st place, gold medalist(s)	2nd place, silver medalist(s)	3rd place, bronze medalist(s)	Female	Youth	Mixed
2017	Open Skiff, Lac du Der (France); Eurocup, Medemblik (Netherlands); Nieuwpoortweek, Nieuwpoort (Belgium); World Championship, Lake Como (Italy); Czech National, Lipno (Czech Republic)	(Italy) ITA 1032; Michele Oppizzi (ITA); Pietro Frazzica (ITA)	(United Kingdom) GBR 1097; Richard Russell (GBR); Hannah Snellgrove (GBR)	(Netherlands) NED 1038; Anneke Kikkert (NED); Floris Stapel (NED)	(Italy) ITA 892; Giulia Rossi (ITA); Adriana Campanella (ITA)	(Italy) ITA 1032; Michele Oppizzi (ITA); Pietro Frazzica (ITA)	
2018	Eurocup, Carnac (France); World Championship, Weymouth (United Kingdom); Colico, Lake Como (Italy)	(Italy) ITA 1032; Michele Oppizzi (ITA); Pietro Frazzica (ITA)	(Netherlands) NED 819; Pim van Vugt (NED); Lisa van Vugt (NED)	(Italy) ITA 1617; Tommaso Marchesi (ITA); Isaia Del Rosso (ITA)	(Italy) ITA 892; Giulia Rossi (ITA); Adriana Campanella (ITA)	(Italy) ITA 1032; Michele Oppizzi (ITA); Pietro Frazzica (ITA)	
2019	Open Skiff, Lac Du Der (France); Open DutchChampionship, Bruinisse (Netherlands); EuropaCup Regatta, Lake Como (Italy); World Championship, Lake Lipno (Czech Republic)	(United Kingdom) GBR 659; Peter Curtis (GBR); James Curtis (GBR)	(Italy) ITA 1604; I. Roncuzzi (ITA); F. Roncuzzi (ITA)	(Italy) ITA 1617; Tommaso Marchesi (ITA); Iasia Del Rosso (ITA)	(Italy) ITA 892; Giulia Rossi (ITA); Adriana Campanella (ITA)	(Italy) ITA 1604; I. Roncuzzi (ITA); F Roncuzzi (ITA)	(Italy) ITA 1642; C. Rossi (ITA); L. Andreani (ITA)
2020	canceled						
