= Peter Barton =

Peter Barton may refer to:

- Peter Barton (actor) (born 1956), American actor
- Peter Barton (cricketer) (born 1941), New Zealand cricketer
- Peter Barton (historian) (born 1955), British military historian
- Peter Barton (rugby league), rugby league footballer of the 1960s
- Peter Barton, Liberty Media president
