= International Marblehead =

Yacht category

The International Marblehead is a class of radio controlled sailing yacht used for competitive racing. It is a measurement controlled class administered by the International Radio Sailing Association. As a designated International IRSA class it is entitled to hold World Championships officially recognised by the World Sailing.

== History ==
The class predates radio sailing with it initially used for racing on ponds using vane steering systems.

== Current Key Dimensions ==
- maximum hull length of 1290mm
- maximum draught of 700mm,
- no displacement controls
- Up to six rigs are allowed in three groups
- the tallest rig being a maximum of 2200mm.

== Events ==
- Marblehead World Championship
