= International A Class =

Category of radio-controlled boat

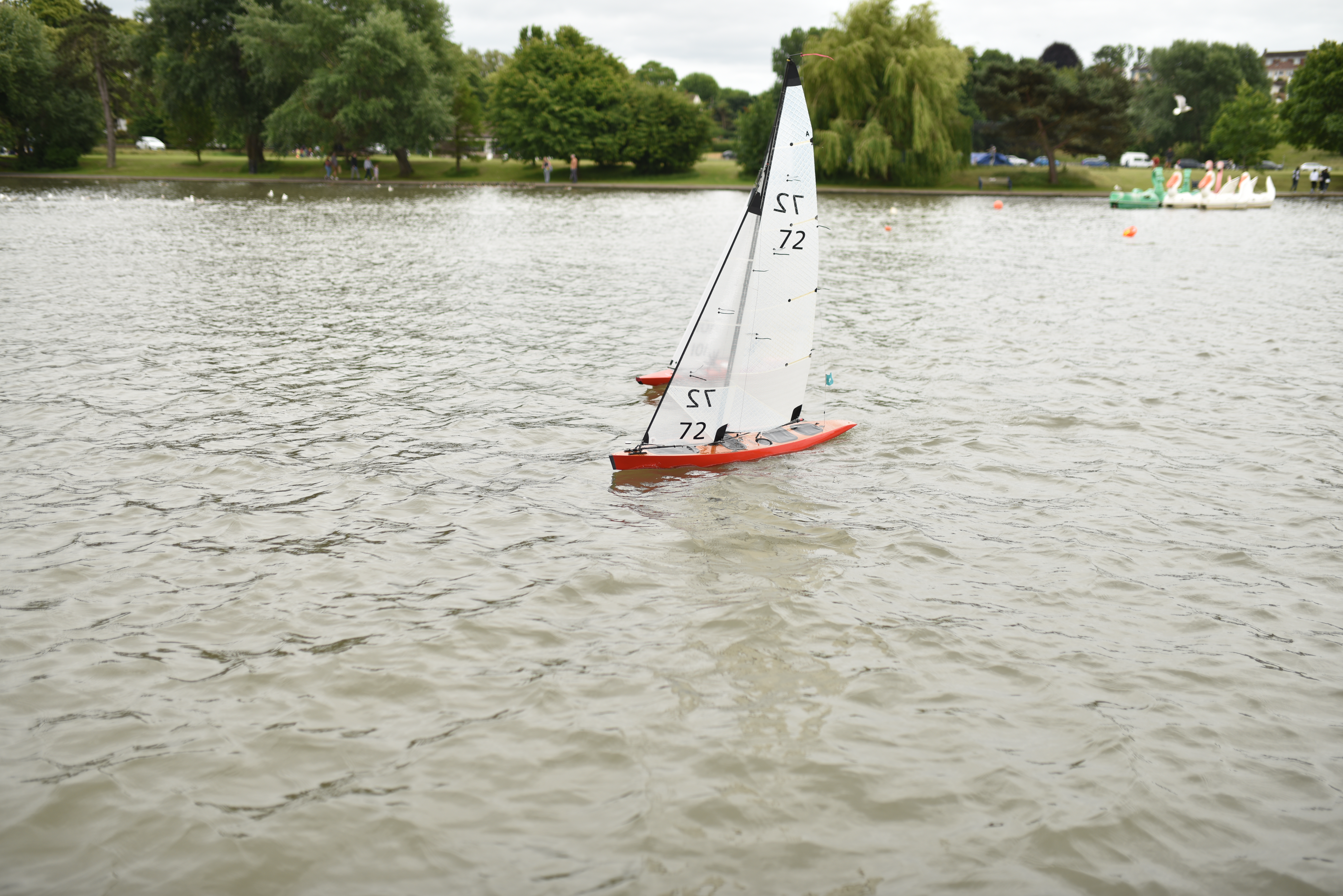
A Class at Woodspring MSC

The International Radio A Class (RA) is a class of radio controlled sailing yacht used for competitive racing. It is a measurement controlled classes administered by the International Radio Sailing Association. The class is a designated IRSA International class entitled to hold World Championships officially recognised by the International Sailing Federation. A RA class of boat is a classic looking boat similar to that of the full sized metre class. The RA class rules are loosely based on the 5.5 Metre. Modern boats use the latest carbon fibre technology with displacements typically between 13 – 16 kg, making them substantial yachts.

== Events ==
=== World Championships ===
Year	Gold	Silver	Bronze
2005, Gosport	Graham BANTOCK (GBR) Design Sword / Graham Bantock	Ken BINKS (GBR) Design Sword / Graham Bantock	Peter WILES (GBR) Design Sweet 9 / Roger Stollery

=== Unofficial World Championships ===
Unclear of the status of these events as the International Radio Sailing Association only joined ISAF in the mid-1990s.

Event	Gold	Silver	Bronze
1993, Knud So Lake Ry	Derek PRIESTLEY (GBR)		
