= 10 Rater =

Class of radio controlled sailing yacht

The International 10 Rater (10R) is a class of radio controlled sailing yacht used for competitive racing. It is a measurement controlled classes administered by the International Radio Sailing Association. The class is a designated IRSA International class entitled to hold World Championships officially recognised by the World Sailing. A 10 rater is the longest and tallest of all the international classes and has rules that allow the most scope for development.

== Events ==
=== World Championships ===
Year	Gold	Silver	Bronze	Ref.
1999, Changi; Singapore	Graham Bantock (GBR); Design - Prizm (Own Design)	Philip Playle (GBR); Design - Prizm	Mark Dennis (GBR)	
2016, Lake Garda; Italy	Brad Gibson (GBR); Trance (Own Design)	Graham Bantock (GBR); Diamond (Own Design)	Christophe Boisnault (FRA); Rubis	
2018, Biblis; Germany	Brad Gibson (GBR); Trance (Own Design)	Christophe Boisnault (FRA); Kamsin	Matteo Longhi (ITA); Nioutaine	
2020, West Kirby; United Kingdom	Cancelled COVID 19			
2023; Castiglione del Lago; Italy	Matteo Longhi (ITA); Design - "Trance" by Brad Gibson	Graham Bantock (GBR); Design - "Diamond" (Own Design)	Patrice Montero (FRA); Design - "Diamond"	
2025; France	Ante Kovacevic (CRO); Design - "Diamond"	Graham Bantock (GBR); Design - "Diamond" (Own Design)	Guillaume Florent (FRA); Design - "NIOUTAINE"	

==== Unofficial World Championships ====
Unclear of the status of these events as the International Radio Sailing Association only joined ISAF in the mid 1990s.

Event	Gold	Silver	Bronze
1975, Gosport	Lennart AKESSON (SWE)		
1978, Durban	Squire KAY (GBR)		
1980, Ottawa	Squire KAY (GBR)		
1982, Dunkerque	Pierre JAHAN (FRA)		
1987, Gothenburg	Janusz WALICKI (GER)		
1991, Viry-Châtillon	Paul LUCAS (FRA)		
1993, Lake Bonney SE	Janusz WALICKI (GER)		
