= International Radio Sailing Association =

The International Radio Sailing Association (IRSA) formerly the ISAF Radio Sailing Division is an affiliate member of World Sailing that sanctions radio-controlled sailing competitions. It is authorised by WS to conduct up to three official World Championships each year.

== Classes ==
Four classes of radio sailing boat are designated as IRSA classes, as follows from the smallest to largest:

- International One Metre

The IOM class rules specify a monohull of maximum length 1000 mm, with maximum draught 420 mm. There is a minimum weight of 4000 g, which makes homebuilding of competitive boats possible. The IOM has three one-design rigs. To keep costs down, hull materials are restricted to either wood or glassfiber, while masts and booms are restricted to either aluminium or wood.

- International Marblehead

A Marblehead has a maximum length of 1290 mm and a maximum draught of ca 700 mm, but no minimum displacement. Up to six rigs are allowed.

- International Ten Rater
- International A Class

== History ==
At the I.M.Y.R.U. General Meeting at Dunkerque in 1982, it was resolved to adopt the IYRR and IYRU Measurement Instructions and to follow the IYRU Constitution and Regulations as closely as possible. For the next eight years a lot of very hard work was done by the I.M.Y.R.U., particularly by its then chairman, Norman Hatfield, to get Model Yachting accepted into membership of the full-size governing body, the International Yacht Racing Union (IYRU). This work culminated on 1 May 1990 when the I.M.Y.R.U. became the Model Yacht Racing Division of the IYRU (IYRU - MYRD). In its turn, in August 1996, the IYRU changed its name to the International Sailing Federation (ISAF) and IYRU-MYRD became the ISAF Radio Sailing Division (RSD). In 2009 the Division changed its name to International Radio Sailing Association to make it clear that it was an independent body and not a part of ISAF, now World Sailing. The two organisations have close links with World Sailing officially recognising its World Championships and using the IRSA to advise on developments of Appendix E of the Racing Rules of Sailing.
