= James (surname) =

James is a surname in the French language, and in the English language originating from the given name, itself derived from Old French James, variant form of Jacme, Jame, from Late Latin Jacomus, variant form of Latin Jacobus, itself from Hebrew יַעֲקֹב (Yaʿaqōḇ). Notable people with the surname include:

== A ==
- A. P. T. James (c. 1908–1962), better known as 'Fargo' James; Tobagonian politician
- Aaron James (basketball) (born 1952), American basketball player
- Aaron James (Australian footballer) (born 1976), Australian rules footballer from Victoria
- Ada James (1876–1952), American suffragist and reformer
- Adam James (actor) (born 1972), British actor
- Adam James (singer) (fl. 2000s–2010s), Australian country singer
- Aidan James (born 2001), American singer and musician
- Alan James (1890–1952), American film director and screenwriter
- Alan James (poet) (fl. 1970s–2020s), South African poet
- Alec James (cricketer) (1889–1961), Welsh cricketer
- Aled James (born 1982), Welsh rugby union footballer
- Alex James (footballer) (1901–1953), Scottish soccer player
- Alex James (musician) (born 1968), English musician and journalist, member of band Blur
- Alex James (songwriter) (born 1976), songwriter and producer
- Alice James (1848–1892), American diarist
- Allen James (born 1964), American racewalker
- Andre James (born 1997), American football player
- Andrea James (born 1967), American writer, film producer, director and LGBT rights activist
- Andrea James (playwright), Australian playwright, author of Sunshine Super Girl
- Angela James (born 1964), Canadian ice hockey player
- Angharad James (poet) (1677–1749), Welsh language poet
- Ann James (born 1952), Australian illustrator and writer
- Ann James (artist) (1925–2011), English-born Canadian artist and educator
- Annie Laurie Wilson James (1862–?), American journalist
- Anthony James (actor) (1942–2020), American actor
- Anthony James (artist) (born 1974), English sculptor, painter and performance artist
- Antonio James (c. 1954–1996), American murderer
- Antony James (born 1989), British swimmer
- Archibald James (1893–1980), British politician and Royal Air Force officer
- Art and Arthur James (disambiguation), multiple people
  - Art James (1929–2004), American game show host
  - Art James (baseball), American baseball player
  - Arthur James (racehorse owner) (1853–1917), British racehorse owner
  - Arthur James (footballer) (1855–1911), English footballer
  - Arthur James (politician) (1883–1973), Governor of Pennsylvania
  - Arthur Lorne James (1903–1964), Air Vice-Marshal in the Royal Canadian Air Force
  - Arthur G. James (1912–2001), American surgeon
  - Arthur James (judge) (1916–1976), English Court of Appeal judge
- Ashley James (curator), American curator
- Augustus James (1866–1934), Australian politician
- Aurora James (born 1984), Canadian creative director, activist, and fashion designer
- Aziaha James (born 2002), American basketball player

== B ==
- Barbara James (disambiguation), multiple people
- Barry James, English stage actor
- Becky James (born 1991), Welsh cyclist
- Benjamin James (disambiguation), multiple people
  - Benjamin James (Nova Scotia politician), farmer and political figure in Nova Scotia
  - Benjamin F. James (1885–1961), Republican member of the U.S. House of Representatives from Pennsylvania
  - Benjamin James (American football) (1912–2015), head football coach for the Dickinson College Red Devils, 1942
  - Benjamin James (Nova Scotia politician), farmer and political figure in Nova Scotia
- Bernard James (born 1985), American basketball player
- Bernie James (baseball) (1905–1994), American baseball player
- Bernie James (born 1958), English–born, American soccer player
- Bert James (disambiguation), multiple people
  - Bert James (baseball) (1886–1959), American baseball player
  - Bert James (1914–2006), Australian politician
- Betty James (1918–2008), American businesswoman who named the slinky
- Bill James (disambiguation), multiple people
  - Bill James (pitcher, born 1887) (1887–1942), baseball player
  - Bill James (pitcher, born 1892) (1892–1971), baseball player
  - Bill James (novelist) (1929–2023), novelist
  - Bill James (American politician) (1930–2022), American politician
  - Bill James (rower), New Zealand rower
  - Bill James (Australian footballer) (born 1937), Australian rules footballer
  - Bill James (born 1949), American baseball writer and historian
  - Billy James (disambiguation), multiple people
  - Billy T. James (1948–1991), New Zealand comedian
  - Billy James (basketball) (born 1950), American professional basketball player
  - Billy James (rugby player) (born 1956), Welsh rugby union player
  - Billy James (1960–2025), American publicist, musician, and author known as Ant-Bee
  - Billy James (publicist), American publicist and talent scout
- Bob James (disambiguation), multiple people
  - Bob James (musician) (born 1939), jazz musician
  - Bob James (rock singer) (1952–2021), singer of Montrose, 1974–1976
  - Bob James (baseball) (born 1958), baseball player for the Expos, Tigers, and White Sox
- Brad James (born 1981), American actor
- Bradley James (disambiguation), multiple people
  - Bradley James, English actor
  - Bradley James (1961–2012), American professional wrestler better known as Brad Armstrong
- Brandon James (born 1987), American footballer
- Bree James, Australian politician
- Brendan James (born 1979), American singer/songwriter
- Brett James (footballer) (born 1972), Australian Rules footballer from South Australia
- Brett James (1968–2025), American singer, songwriter and record producer
- Brian James (disambiguation), multiple people
  - Brian James (actor) (1918–2009), Australian TV actor
  - Brian James (cricketer, born 1934) (1934–2000), English cricketer
  - Brian James (cricketer, born 1941) (1941–2002), English cricketer
  - Brian James (rugby league) (1943–2020), Australian rugby league footballer
  - Brian James (guitarist) (1955–2025), British punk musician, former member of The Damned
  - Brian James (basketball) (born 1956), American basketball coach
  - Brian d'Arcy James (born 1968), American actor and musician
  - Brian Girard James (born 1969), better known as Road Dogg, American professional wrestler
  - Brian R. James (born 1974), American game designer and software engineer
- Brion James (1945–1999), American character actor
- Bronny James (born 2004), American basketball player and son of LeBron James
- Bushrod Washington James (1836–1906), American surgeon, homeopath, educator, writer, and philanthropist
- Butch James (born 1979), South African rugby player

== C ==
- C. L. James (1846–1911), American anarchist writer and journalist
- C. L. R. James (1901–1989), Trinidadian essayist and historian of the Haitian Revolution
- Carl James (1925–2005), American collegiate sports executive
- Carlos James (born 1971), American college baseball coach
- Carol James, New Zealand footballer
- Carol-Ann James, West Indian cricketer
- Carole James (born 1957), Canadian politician
- Carwyn James (1929–1983), Welsh rugby player
- Casey James (born 1982), American singer and guitarist
- Cecil James (1913–1999), English bassoonist
- Cedric James (born 1979), American footballer
- Charlene James, British playwright and screenwriter
- Charles and Charlie James (disambiguation), multiple people
  - Charles Tillinghast James (1805–1862), U.S. Senator from Rhode Island
  - Charles James (MP) (1817–1890), British politician
  - Charles Pinckney James (1818–1899), U.S. federal judge
  - Charles James (chemist) (1880–1928), British–born discoverer of lutetium
  - Charles James (footballer) (1882–1960), English footballer for Stoke
  - Charles James (rugby league) (1891–1917), New Zealand rugby league footballer
  - Charles Holloway James (1893–1953), British architect
  - Charles James (designer) (1906–1978), British–American fashion designer
  - Charles James (attorney) (born 1954), U.S. assistant attorney general
  - Charles James (American football) (born 1990), American football cornerback
  - Charlie James (baseball) (born 1937), American baseball player
- Chris James (baseball) (born 1962), American baseball player
- Chris James (racing driver) (born 1978), British auto racing driver and businessman
- Chris James (footballer) (born 1987), New Zealand soccer player
- Christine James (born 1954), Welsh poet and academic, first female Archdruid of Wales
- Christopher James, 5th Baron Northbourne (1926–2019), British farmer and aristocrat
- Christopher James (poet) (born 1975), British poet
- Ciaran James (born 1991), British water polo player
- Cindy James (1944–1989), Canadian formerly missing person
- Chuck James (born 1981), American baseball player
- Clement James (footballer) (born 1981), British footballer
- Cleo James (born 1940), American baseball player
- Clifton James (1921–2017), American actor
- Clive James (1939–2019), Australian writer, poet, essayist, critic, and commentator on popular culture
- Colette Kreder née James (1934–2022), French engineer, entrepreneur and feminist
- Colin James (bishop) (1926–2009), Bishop of Wakefield, 1977–1985, and Winchester, 1985–1995
- Colin James (journalist) (born 1944), New Zealand journalist
- Colin James (born 1964), Canadian musician
- Connor James (born 1982), Canadian ice hockey player
- Connor James (soccer) (born 1996), Canadian soccer player
- Cordelia James, Baroness James of Rusholme (1912–2007), British educator and justice of the peace
- Craig James (disambiguation), multiple people
  - Craig James (born 1941), U.S. Representative from Florida
  - Craig James (running back) (born 1961), American football player and sportscaster
  - Craig James (economist) (born 1962), Australian economist
  - Craig James (English footballer) (born 1982), English footballer

== D ==
- Dafydd James (born 1975), Welsh rugby union international and British Lion
- Dai James (1899–after 1929), Welsh forward
- Dan and Daniel James (disambiguation), multiple people
  - Dan James (1937–1987), American footballer
  - Daniel James (businessman) (1801–1876), one of the co-founders of Phelps, Dodge & Co.
  - Daniel Willis James (1832–1907), American businessman
  - Daniel James (Gwyrosydd) aka "Gwyrosydd" (1848–1920), Welsh poet and hymn-writer
  - Daniel Lewis James (1911–1988), American author
  - Daniel James Jr. aka "Chappie" (1920–1978), African American USAF general
  - Daniel James (historian) (born 1948), British historian and expert in Peronism
  - Daniel James (soldier) (born 1962), British Army Corporal and interpreter, convicted of espionage
  - Daniel James (game developer) (born 1971), British-Canadian video game developer
  - Daniel James (music producer) (born 1975), Australian music producer and songwriter
  - Daniel James (footballer) (born 1997), Welsh soccer player
- Darren James (broadcaster) (born 1960), Australian radio broadcaster
- Darren James (born 1964), American pornographic actor
- Dave James (racing driver) (1928–1987), American racing driver
- David James (disambiguation)
  - David James (actor, born 1839) (1839–1893), English comic actor and one of the founders of London's Vaudeville Theatre
  - David James (actor, born 1967) (born 1967), Australian television and film actor; and former presenter of ABC's Play School
  - David James (actor, born 1972) (born 1972), South African film, theater, and television actor known for playing Koobus Venter in the 2009 film District 9
  - David James (bishop) (born 1945), current bishop of Bradford
  - David James (cell biologist) (born 1958), cell biologist who discovered the glucose transporter GLUT4
  - David James (cricketer, born 1921) (1921–2002), Welsh cricketer
  - David James (footballer, born 1917) (1917–1981), Welsh forward
  - David James (footballer, born 1942) (born 1942), Scottish forward
  - David James (footballer, born 1970) (born 1970), English goalkeeper
  - David James (politician, born 1843) (1843–1921), member of the Wisconsin State Senate
  - David James (politician, born 1919) (1919–1986), British politician and member of the Conservative Party
  - David James, Baron James of Blackheath (born 1937), British corporate trouble-shooter, former chairman of the Millennium Dome, and author of the Conservative Party's James Report
  - David James (rugby, born 1866) (1866–1929), Welsh international rugby player
  - David James (rugby, born 1906) (1906–1981), Welsh rugby union and professional rugby league footballer
  - David James (rugby, born 1985) (born 1985), Welsh rugby league player
- Deborah Lee James (born 1958), United States Secretary of the Air Force
- Deborah James (disambiguation)
  - Deborah James (activist) (born 1971), American activist
  - Deborah James (anthropologist) (born 1954), South African anthropologist and academic
- Dennis James (1917–1997), American actor and game show host
- Dennis James (musician) (born 1950), American musician prominent in the revival of silent films
- Dennis James (bodybuilder) (born 1969), African-American bodybuilder
- Derwin James (born 1996), American football player
- Devin James Stone, American lawyer and YouTuber
- Diane James (born 1959), UKIP MEP
- Dick James (1920–1986), music publisher
- Dick James (American football) (1934–2000), American footballer
- D. J. James (born 2001), American football player
- Dominic James (basketball) (born 1986), American basketball player
- Dominic James (ice hockey) (born 2002), American ice hockey player
- Dominic James (producer) (born 1976), Canadian filmmaker
- Don and Donald James (disambiguation), multiple people
  - Don James (American football) (1932–2013), American college football head coach
  - Don James (video games), Nintendo executive
  - Donald James (surfer) (died 1996), American pre-WWII surfer
  - Donald James (1931–2008), English novelist and television writer
  - Donald Chris James (born 1962), American baseball player
- Dorothy James (1901–1982), American composer
- Doug James (American football) (born 1962), American footballer and broadcaster
- Doug James (musician) (born 1953), American musician
- Duncan Airlie James (born 1961), Scottish kickboxer and actor
- Duncan James (born 1978), British singer (Blue)
- Duncan James (Australian singer) (fl. 2003–04), Australian singer
- Dwight James, Barbadian footballer

== E ==
- E. L. James (born 1963), British author (Fifty Shades of Grey)
- E. O. James (1888–1972), anthropologist in the field of comparative religion
- Ed, Eddie and Eddy James (disambiguation), multiple people
  - Ed James (writer) (1908–1995), American writer and creator of the U.S. sitcom Father Knows Best
  - Ed James (disc jockey) (born 1976), radio DJ
  - Eddie James (Canadian football) (1907–1958), Canadian football running back
  - Eddie James (1961–2025), American murderer
  - Eddy James (1874–1937), Australian rules footballer
- Edgerrin James (born 1978), American football player
- Edison James (born 1943), Prime Minister of Dominica
- Edmond James (1874–1952), British colonial administrator
- Edward James (disambiguation), multiple people
  - Edward James (martyr) (c. 1557–1588), English Catholic priest and martyr
  - Edward James (clergyman) (1569–1610?), Welsh clergyman and translator
  - Edward James (judge) (1757–1841), judge and politician in Nova Scotia
  - Edward James (barrister) (1807–1867), English barrister
  - Edward James (Nova Scotia politician) (1825–1909), politician in Nova Scotia, Canada
  - Edward Holton James (1873–1954), American socialist
  - Edward James (cricketer) (1896–1975), Welsh cricketer
  - Edward James (1907–1984), British poet and art patron
  - Edward James (historian) (born 1947), Professor of medieval history at University College Dublin
- Edwin James (scientist) (1797–1861), American botanist, geographer, geologist and explorer
- Edwin James (lawyer) (c. 1812–1882), English lawyer, Member of Parliament and would-be actor
- Edwin Leland James (1890–1951), American newspaper editor
- Eithan James (born 2000), English professional boxer
- Eleanor James (born 1986), English actress
- Elinor James (1644–1719), British printer and writer
- Elizabeth James-Perry (born 1973), American artist and restoration ecologist
- Elmore James (1918–1963), American blues singer, songwriter and musician
- Emrys James (1928–1989), Welsh actor
- Eric James (disambiguation), multiple people
  - Eric James (cricketer, 1881–1948) (1881–1948), Australian cricketer
  - Eric James, Baron James of Rusholme (1909–1992), English peer and academic
  - Eric James (cricketer, 1923–1999) (1923–1999), Australian cricketer
  - Eric James (clergyman) (1925–2012), British Anglican clergyman
- Erica James (born 1960), British novelist
- Etta James (1938–2012), American R&B and gospel singer
- Eugene James (1913–1933), American jockey
- Evan James (disambiguation), multiple people
  - Evan James (poet) (1809–1878), composer of the Welsh national anthem
  - Evan James (civil servant) (1846–1923), Indian Civil Service
  - Evan James (cricketer) (1918–1989), Welsh cricketer
  - Evan James (rugby) (1869–1901), Welsh rugby international
  - Evan James (soccer) (born 1990), Canadian soccer player
  - Evan James (writer), American writer

== F ==
- Faruq Mahfuz Anam James (born 1964), Bangladeshi singer, better know simply as James
- Florence James (1902–1993), Australian author and literary agent
- Fob James (born 1934), American politician; 48th Governor of Alabama
- Frances James (soprano) (1903–1988), Canadian soprano
- Frances James (ecologist) (born 1930), American ecologist
- Francesca James (born 1949), American actress
- Francis James (congressman) (1799–1886), U.S. Representative from Pennsylvania
- Francis James (missionary) (1851–1900), British Christian missionary in China
- Francis James (1918–1992), Australian publisher
- Frank James (disambiguation), multiple people
  - Frank James (MP) (1821–1924), British politician
  - Frank James (1843–1915), American outlaw
  - Frank Linsly James (1851–1890), English explorer
  - Frank Cyril James (1903–1973), Canadian academic and principal of McGill University
  - Frank B. James (1912–2004), U.S. Air Force general
  - Frank James (racing driver) (born 1938), American racing driver
  - Frank A. James, III (born 1953), American historian
- Fred James (disambiguation), multiple people
  - Fred J. James, American architect
  - Fred James (Australian footballer) (1884–1948), Australian rules footballer
  - Fred James (Canadian football) (1945–2016), Canadian rules football defensive linemen
- Freddie James (born 1937), American football coach
- Frederic James (1915–1985), American artist
- Frederick James (artist) (1845–1907), American artist
- Frederick Seton James, (1870–1934), British colonial administrator
- Frederick Alexander James (1884–1957), Australian merchant and litigant

== G ==
- Gareth James (born 1984), English cricketer
- Gary James (born 1960), English drummer
- Garry James (born 1963), American footballer
- Gee Gee James (1902 or 1903–1971), American actress
- Gene James (1925–1997), American professional basketball player
- George James (disambiguation)
  - George James (soldier) (1760–1811), colonel of the Royal Northumberland Fusiliers
  - George Payne Rainsford James (1799–1860), novelist and historical writer
  - George Wharton James (1858–1923), prolific popular lecturer and journalist
  - George James (footballer) (1899–1976), English footballer
  - George K. James (1905–1994), American college sports coach
  - George James (musician) (1906–1995), American jazz saxophonist
  - George James (writer) (died c. 1954), Guyanese writer
  - George James, Jr. (1927–2008), former head college football coach for the Kentucky State University Thorobreds
- Gerald James (1917–2006), British actor
- Geraldine James (born 1950), English actress
- Gerard Luz James (born 1953), United States Virgin Islander politician, funeral director and businessman
- Gérard James, American set decorator
- Gerry James (1934–2024), Canadian football, and ice hockey player
- Gill James (1934–2025), Australian politician
- Glenicia James (born 1974), West Indian cricketer
- Glyn James (born 1941), Welsh footballer
- Gordon James (actor) (1878–1949) English actor
- Gordon C. James, American political consultant
- Graham James (disambiguation)
  - Graham James (bishop) (born 1951), British Bishop of Norwich
  - Graham James (ice hockey) (born 1954), former Canadian ice hockey coach and convicted sex offender
- Grayson James (born 2002), American football player
- Greg James (disambiguation)
  - Greg James (born 1985), British broadcaster, author and podcaster
  - Greg James (judge) (born 1944), Supreme Court of New South Wales judge
  - Greg James (tattoo artist), American tattoo artist

== H ==
- H. Evan James (fl. 1908–1920), British Olympic fencer
- Hannah Packard James (1835–1903), American library pioneer
- Harold and Harry James (disambiguation), multiple people
  - Harold James (archer) (1868–1948), British archer
  - Harold James (historian) (born 1956), economic historian
  - Harold James (Pennsylvania politician) (1942–2022), State Representative
  - Harry James (Australian rules footballer) (1877–1940), Australian rules footballer
  - Harry James (American football) (1881–1947), American football quarterback
  - Harry James (1916–1983), American musician
- Harriet Wright O'Leary James (1916–1999), American teacher and politician and first woman to serve on the tribal council of the Choctaw Nation of Oklahoma
- Helen F. James (born 1956), American paleornithologist
- Helen G. James (born 1927), American equality activist
- Henry James (disambiguation), multiple people
  - Henry James (British Army officer) (1803–1877), director-general of the Ordnance Survey
  - Henry James, Sr. (1811–1882), American theologian
  - Henry James, 1st Baron James of Hereford (1828–1911), English lawyer and statesman
  - Henry James (1843–1916), American author and critic
  - Henry Evan Murchison James (1846–1923), British officer in the Indian Civil Service, explorer and writer
  - Henry James (priest) (1864–1949), Dean of Bangor Cathedral, 1934–1940
  - Henry James (biographer) (1879–1947), winner of the 1931 Pulitzer Prize for Biography or Autobiography
  - Henry James (basketball) (born 1965), American basketball player
- Hilary James, British musician
- Hilda James (1904–1982), British Olympic swimmer
- Horace James (footballer) (born 1984), Jamaican footballer
- Horace James (minister) (1818–1875), American clergyman who served with the Union Army and assisted freedmen
- Hugh James (disambiguation)
  - Hugh James (footballer) (1890–1967), Australian rules footballer
  - Hugh James (physician) (1750–1797), Scottish physician and surgeon
  - Hugh James (RAF officer) (1922–2015), Welsh aviator

== I ==
- Iain James (born 1980), English singer/songwriter
- Ian James (athlete) (born 1963), Canadian Olympic long jumper
- Ifor James (1931–2004), British musician and teacher
- Ioan James (1928–2025), British mathematician
- Isaac James (Medal of Honor) (1838–1914), American soldier who fought in the American Civil War
- Ivor James (1882–1963), British cellist

== J ==
- Jack James (Australian rules footballer) (1892–1977), played for St Kilda and Richmond in Victoria
- Jack James (rocket engineer) (1920–2001), American who worked on NASA's Mariner program
- Jackie James, Scottish musician
- Jaime Martín James (born 1994), Argentine musician better known as Louta
- James James (1833–1902), Welsh musician (composer of 'Land of my Fathers')
- Jamie James (born 1953), Canadian guitarist and singer-songwriter
- Janelle James (born 1979), American comedian, actress, writer
- Jason James (disambiguation), multiple people
  - Jason James (basketball) (born 1977), American college basketball coach
  - Jason James (musician) (born 1981), Welsh musician
- Jay James (Bullet for My Valentine) (born 1981), Welsh musician
- Jeff James (baseball) (1941–2006), American baseball player
- Jeff James (musician) (born 1988), American singer and songwriter
- Jeffrey James, Australian news anchor
- Jennifer James (born 1977), English actress
- Jeremy James (disambiguation)
  - Jeremy James (bishop), Anglican bishop in Australia
  - Jeremy James (sculptor) (born 1964), British sculptor
  - Jeremy James (singer/songwriter) (born 1978), American musician
- Jeremías James (born 2001), Argentine footballer
- Jesse James (disambiguation)
  - Jesse James (1847–1882), American outlaw, member of the James-Younger Gang
  - Jesse E. James (1875–1951), only surviving son of American outlaw Jesse James
  - Jesse James (actor) (born 1989), American actor
  - Jesse James (songwriter), American writer of the 1968 hit instrumental "The Horse"
  - Jesse James (television personality) (born 1969), custom vehicle maker and American television personality
  - Jesse James (Texas Treasurer) (1904–1977), Texas State Treasurer
  - Jesse James (tight end) (born 1994), American football player
- Jewell James (born 1953), Lummi master wood carver, activist
- Jill James, American biochemist
- Jim James (born 1978), American musician
- Joe James (disambiguation)
  - Joe James (American football) (1934–2015), head football coach for the Howard Payne University Yellow Jackets
  - Joe James (footballer) (1910–1993), English football centre half for Brentford
  - Joe James (racing driver) (1925–1952), American racecar driver
  - Joe James (soccer) (born 1961), U.S. soccer defender
- John James (disambiguation):
  - John James (architect) (1673–1746), English architect
  - John James (actor) (born 1956), American actor
  - John James (Australian rules footballer) (1934–2010), Australian Rules footballer
  - John James (Michigan politician) (born 1981), American businessman
  - John Ernest James (1884–1945), Welsh Congregational minister in Australia
- Jonathan James (1983–2008), American cybercriminal
- Joni James (1930–2022), American singer
- Jordan James (American football) (born 2004), American football player
- Joseph James and Joseph James, Jr., (born c. 1790 and 1820 respectively), Native American interpreters
- Joshua James (disambiguation), multiple people
  - Joshua James (actor), British actor
  - Joshua James (cricketer) (born 2001), Trinidadian cricketer
  - Joshua James (folk singer), American rock and folk musician
  - Joshua James (lifesaver) (1826–1902), American sea captain; commander of civilian life-saving crews
  - Josh James (born 1973), American entrepreneur, founder of Domo and co-founder of Omniture
  - Josh James (baseball) (born 1993), baseball player
  - Josh James (singer) (born 1990), English singer born James Dubovie
  - Joshua James, founder of Zig Media
- Josiah-Jordan James (born 2000), American basketball player
- Justin James (disambiguation), multiple people
  - Justin James (baseball) (born 1981), former professional baseball player
  - Justin James (basketball) (born 1997), American basketball player
  - Justin James (golfer) (born 1990), American golfer
  - Justin James (musician), American singer-songwriter
  - Justin James (music producer) (born 1975), Canadian electronic musician, DJ, and producer
  - Justin James (music director), Indian composer, singer and guitarist in Malayalam cinema

== K ==
- Kamara James (1984–2014), American Olympic fencer
- Kasey James (born 1982), American wrestler
- Kelly James (1958–2006), American mountain climber
- Kendall James (born 1991), American football player
- Kendra James (died 2003) African American woman shot dead by a police officer
- Ken, Kenneth and Kenny James (disambiguation), multiple people
  - Ken James (cricketer) (1904–1976), former New Zealand Test cricketer
  - Ken James (politician) (1934–2014), former Canadian Member of Parliament
  - Ken James (Australian actor) (born 1948), Australian actor
  - Kenneth Tyler James (born 1982), musician
  - Kenny James (American football) (born 1984), American football running back
- Kevin James (disambiguation), multiple people
  - Kevin James (born 1965), American actor and comedian
  - Kevin James (bowls) (born 1984), Welsh lawn bowler
  - Kevin James (broadcaster) (born 1963), conservative radio host and political commentator
  - Kevin James (cricketer) (born 1987), West Indian cricketer
  - Kevin James (English footballer) (born 1980), footballer for Dulwich Hamlet
  - Kevin James (magician) (born 1962), French-born American magician
  - Kevin James (Scottish footballer) (born 1975), footballer for Ayr United
  - Kevin James (terrorist) (born c.1976), American who pleaded guilty to planning terrorist attacks in California
- Kim James, American politician
- Kirani James (born 1992), Grenadian sprinter

== L ==
- L. Dean James (1947–2018), American writer
- LaMareon James (born 2000), American football player
- Larry James (disambiguation), multiple people
  - Larry James (1947–2008) American Olympic sprinter
  - Larry C. James, former chief psychologist at Guantanamo, and author of Fixing Hell
  - Larry D. James (born 1956), Lt. General in the United States Air Force
  - Larry M. James (born 1950), President and CEO of CitySquare
- Laura James (nurse) (1880–1969), New Zealand nurse in World War I
- Laura James (born 1990), American model
- LeBron James (born 1984), American basketball player
- Lee James (politician) (born 1948), member of the Pennsylvania House of Representatives
- Lee James (weightlifter) (1953–2023) American weightlifter
- Lee S. James (born 1973), English golfer
- Lee James (BBC) (fl. 2009), British sports broadcaster
- Leela James (born 1983), American singer
- Leighton James (1953–2024), Welsh footballer
- Lennie James (born 1965), English actor
- Leon James (born 2001), Thai footballer
- Les James (1890–1917), Australian rules footballer
- Letitia James (born 1958), American lawyer, activist, and politician in Brooklyn
- Lily James (born 1989), English actress
- Lionel James (1962–2022), American football player
- Linda James (born 1951), British–born New Zealand artist
- Liz James, British art historian
- Louis N. James, (1882–1935) American golfer
- Louis Robert James (1920–1996), Australian painter
- Louisa James (born 1979), English journalist and newsreader
- Luke James (disambiguation), multiple people
  - Luke James (footballer) (born 1994), striker for Morpeth Town
  - Luke James (rugby union) (born 1999), English rugby player
  - Luke James (singer) (born 1984), American R&B singer
- Lulu James (born c. 1992), British electronic and soul singer
- Lungiswa James, South African politician

== M ==
- Mabel Moir James (1917–2010), Dominican politician
- Mandy James (born 1978), American rhythmic gymnast
- Mansell Richard James (1893–?), Canadian-born aviator
- Marise James, US Virgin Islands politician
- Margaret Calkin James (1895–1985), graphic designer
- Margot James (born 1957), British politician
- Maria James (1793–1868), Welsh-born American poet
- Marion James (1934–2015), American blues singer and songwriter
- Mark James (disambiguation), multiple people
  - Mark James (British cleric) (1845–1898), British-Bermudan priest
  - Mark James (songwriter) 1940–2024), American songwriter
  - Mark James (golfer) (born 1953), English golfer
  - Mark Andrew James, American conductor and oboist
- Markey James (1941–2018), American racing driver
- Martin James (disambiguation), multiple people
  - Martin S. James (1920–2011), English-American art historian
  - Martin James (cricketer) (born 1963), English cricketer
  - Martin James (footballer, born 1971) (born 1971), English professional football player
- Marty James, American singer/songwriter
- Marvin James (born 1989), Swiss snowboarder
- Mary James (educator), associate director of Research at the University of Cambridge
- Mathew, Matt, Matthew and Matty James (disambiguation), multiple people
  - Mathew James (umpire) (born 1974), Australian rules football umpire
  - Matt James (game designer) (born 1981), American game designer
  - Matt James (rugby league) (born 1987), British rugby league player
  - Matt James (TV presenter) (born 1975), British host of shows such as The City Gardener
  - Matthew C. James 19th century Marine architect, poet and songwriter
  - Matthew James (politician) (born 1955), American politician from Virginia
  - Matthew James (actor) (born 1973), American actor
  - Matty James (born 1991), English footballer for Leicester City
- Maude Wordsworth James (1855–1936), Australian designer, author and songwriter
- Max James (born 1951), Australian rules footballer from South Australia
- Mel James (1948–2022), Welsh rugby union and rugby league footballer
- Melville James (1877–1957), Australian Anglican bishop
- Merlin James (born 1960), British artist
- M. E. Clifton James (1898–1963), British actor, impersonator of Field Marshal Bernard Montgomery
- Michael, Mickie and Mike James (disambiguation), multiple people
  - Michael James (singer) (born 1988), British singer and songwriter
  - Michael James (politician) (1861–1943), Canadian politician of the early 20th century
  - Michael James (Australian footballer) (born 1971), Australian rules footballer
  - Michael James (producer) (born 1962), American record producer, guitarist, and mixing engineer
  - Michael James (quilt artist) (born 1949), American artist
  - Mickie James (born 1979), American professional wrestler
  - Mike James (baseball) (born 1967), American baseball player
  - Mike James (rugby union) (born 1973), Canadian rugby union player
  - Mike James (basketball, born 1975) (born 1975), American basketball player
  - Mike James (basketball, born 1990) (born 1990), American basketball player
  - Mike James (American football) (born 1991)
- Miles James (1829–1871), American soldier and Medal of Honour recipient
- Miss James (1830–1910), English philanthropist
- Montague Rhodes James (1862–1936), British mediaeval scholar and writer
- Morgan James (born 1981), American singer/songwriter and actress

== N ==
- Naomi James (born 1949), New Zealand sailor
- Natalie James, married name of Natalie Caine (1909–2008), English oboist
- Nate James (born 1977), British singer/songwriter
- Nate James (basketball) (born 1977), American basketball player
- Neil James (1961–2014), English rugby league footballer
- Nick James (disambiguation), multiple people
  - Nick James (American football) (born 1993), defensive tackle
  - Nick James (cricketer) (born 1986), English cricketer
  - Nick James (critic), British film critic
  - Nicholas James (actor) (born 1982), American actor also credited as Nick James
  - Nicholas James (MP) (died 1433), MP for City of London
- Nicky James (1943–2007), British musician and songwriter
- Norman James (disambiguation), multiple people
  - Norman James (broadcaster), Canadian sports broadcaster
  - Norman James (footballer) (1908–1985), English footballer
  - Norman B. James (1872–1963), Canadian politician
  - Norman L. James (1840–1918), American politician

== O ==
- Olga James (1929–2025), American singer and actress
- Oliver James (disambiguation)
  - Oliver James (actor) (born 1980), English musician, singer, songwriter and actor
  - Oliver James (cricketer) (born 1990), Welsh cricketer
  - Oliver James (footballer) (born 1987), English professional footballer
  - Oliver James (psychologist) (born 1953), pop psychologist, author and television presenter
  - Oliver James (rower) (born 1990), Paralympic rower
  - Ollie Murray James (1871–1918), American politician

== P ==
- P. D. James (1920–2014), British crime writer
- Paul James (disambiguation), multiple people
  - Paul James (academic) (born 1958), professor and writer on globalization and social theory
  - Paul James (actor) (born 1981), American actor
  - Paul James (basketball) (born 1964), British professional basketball player and coach
  - Paul James (Canadian musician) (born 1951), blues guitarist
  - Paul James (gardener), host of American television program Gardening by the Yard
  - Paul James (rugby union) (born 1982), Wales international rugby union player
  - Paul James (soccer) (born 1963), Canadian association football (soccer) player and coach
  - Paul James (sportscaster) (1931–2018), American sports announcer
  - Paul James, pen name used by American banker James Warburg (1896–1969) when writing songs with his wife, Kay Swift
  - Paul James, British writer, creator of the comedy character Constance, Lady Crabtree
  - Paul Moon James (1780–1854), English banker and lawyer
- Percy James (1917–1993), Welsh footballer
- Peter James (historian), British historian
- Peter James (writer) (born 1948), British writer
- Peter Wilfred James (1930–2014), British botanist
- Pilli Alfred James (1931–1983), Indian academic
- Polly James – multiple people
  - Polly James (born 1941), British actress
  - Polly James (broadcaster) (fl. 2010–), British broadcaster
  - Polly James (screenwriter) (fl. 1940s–1950s), American screenwriter
- Philip Frederick Wright James (1890–1975), American composer, conductor, and music educator
- Philip Seaforth James (1914–2001), barrister, academic, author, and soldier
- Philip J. K. James (born 1978), British entrepreneur, adventurer, and CEO of Penrose Hill
- Phil Nyokai James (born 1954), teacher, performer, and avant-garde composer

== R ==
- Raji James (born 1970), British actor
- Ralph Duncan James (1909–1979), English and Canadian mathematician
- Reginald W. James (1891–1964), English and South African naturalist and physicist
- Reece James (disambiguation)
  - Reece James (footballer, born 1993) (born 1993), English footballer
  - Reece James (footballer, born 1999) (born 1999), English footballer
- Richard James (disambiguation):
  - Richard James (scholar) (1592–1638), English scholar and librarian
  - Richard James (musician) (born 1975), British musician
  - Richard D. James (born 1971), British musician known as Aphex Twin
  - Richard D. James (scientist) (born 1952), American scientist
  - Richard T. James (1914–1974), American co-inventor of the Slinky
  - Richard T. James (politician) (1910–1965), American politician
- Richie James (born 1995), American football player
- Rick James (1948–2004), African-American funk and soul musician
- Rob, Robbie and Robert James (disambiguation)
  - Rob James (singer) (born 1977), Canadian pop singer
  - Rob James (guitarist), member of The Clarks
  - Robbie James (1957–1998), Welsh soccer player
  - Robert James (physician) (1703–1776), English physician
  - Robert S. James (1818–1850), father of the American outlaw Jesse James
  - Robert James (headmaster) (1905–1982), headmaster of St Paul's School and of Harrow School
  - Robert James (actor) (1924–2004), Scottish actor
  - Robert Rhodes James (1933–1999), British historian and Conservative Member of Parliament
  - Robert G. James (born 1946), United States District Court judge
  - Robert James (defensive back) (born 1947), played in the National Football League, 1969–1974
  - Robert James (linebacker) (born 1983), drafted by the Atlanta Falcons, 2008
- Rosetta James (1925–2019), American community volunteer

== S ==
- Sally James (disambiguation):
  - Sally James (writer) (born 1934), pseudonym of the British romantic novelist Marina Oliver
  - Sally James (presenter) (born 1950), presenter on the ITV Saturday morning children's show Tiswas
  - Sally Knyvette (born 1951), British actress born Sally James
  - Sally James (soccer) (born 2002), Australian soccer goalkeeper
- Sandy James (born 1990), American softball player
- Scottie James (born 1996), American basketball player for the Hapoel Haifa of the Israeli Basketball Premier League
- Sebastian James (born 1966), British businessman and son of Christopher James, 5th Baron Northbourne
- Sharpe James (1936–2025), American politician
- Shawn James (basketball) (born 1983), Guyanese-American basketball player
- Shemar James (born 2004), American football player
- Sid James (1913–1976), South African-born British actor and comedian
- Sion James (born 2002), American basketball player
- Skip James (1902–1969), American blues singer and guitarist
- Sonny James (1928–2016), American country singer
- S.P. (Sydney Price) James (1870–1946), British physician and parasitologist
- Steve James (disambiguation):
  - Steve James (actor) (1952–1993), American actor
  - Steve James (blues musician) (1950–2023), American folk blues musician
  - Steve James (cricketer) (born 1967), English cricketer
  - Steve James (footballer) (born 1949), English soccer player
  - Steve James (snooker player) (born 1961), English snooker player
  - Steve James (born 1965), American professional wrestler better known as Steve Armstrong

== T ==
- T. G. H. James (1923–2009), British Egyptologist, known as Harry James
- Teresa James (1914–2008), American aviator
- Tessa James (born 1991), Australian actress
- Tom James (professor) (born 1971), British professor and author
- Tommy James (born 1947), American musician
- Tony James (born 1958), British musician

== V ==
- Val James (born 1957), American ice hockey player
- Victor James (1897–1984), Australian Unitarian minister and pacifist

== W ==
- Walter James (1863–1943), Premier of Western Australia from 1902 to 1904 and supporter of the federation movement
- Sir Walter James, 1st Baronet (1759–1829), British Baronet and last warden of the Royal Mint
- Walter James, 1st Baron Northbourne (1816–1893), British Member of Parliament
- Walter James, 2nd Baron Northbourne (1846–1923), British Peer and Liberal politician
- Walter James, 4th Baron Northbourne (1896–1982), British Olympic rower and agriculturist
- Wendy James (born 1966), British singer
- Willard D. James (1927–2025), American mathematician
- William James (disambiguation):
  - William James (1842–1910), American philosopher
  - William James (naval commander) (1720–1783), British naval commander
  - W. F. James (1846–1924), Methodist minister in South Australia
  - W. Frank James (1873–1945), US Congressman
  - William H. James (1831–1920), second governor of Nebraska
  - William Levis James (1833–1903), Union Army general
  - William P. James (1870–1940), judge of the United States District Court for the Southern District of California

== Y ==
- Yolande James (born 1977), Canadian politician

== Fictional characters ==
- Kenny James (My Name is Earl), character on My Name is Earl

== Joint biographies ==
- For the James brothers, see Jesse James and Frank James
- John D. James, Thomas G. James, and David D. James, 19th-century American slave traders
- Joseph James and Joseph James Jr., 19th-century Franco-Indigenous American interpreters

== See also ==
- James (disambiguation)
- James (given name)
- Jameson (disambiguation)
- Jamison (disambiguation)
