= Isaac James =

Isaac James may refer to:

- Isaac James (band), an American rock band
- Isaac James (footballer) (born 2004), Nigerian footballer
- Isaac James (Medal of Honor) (1838–1914), American soldier who fought in the American Civil War

== See also ==
- Isaak James, American film director and actor
