= Frederick James =

Frederick James may refer to:

- Frederick James (artist) (1845–1907), American artist
- Frederick Alexander James (1884–1957), Australian merchant and litigant
- Frederick Ernest James (1891–1971), British colonial administrator, businessman and politician
- Frederick Seton James (1870–1934), British colonial administrator

== See also ==
- Frederic James (1915–1985), American painter
- Fred James (disambiguation)
