= Eric James =

Eric James may refer to:

- Eric James (cricketer, 1881–1948), Australian cricketer
- Eric James (cricketer, 1923–1999), Australian cricketer
- Eric James (priest) (1925–2012), Anglican clergyman
- Eric James, Baron James of Rusholme (1909–1992), English peer and academic

== See also ==
- James (surname)
