= Nick James =

Nick or Nicholas James may refer to:

- Nick James (American football) (born 1993), defensive tackle
- Nick James (cricketer) (born 1986), English cricketer
- Nick James (critic), British film critic
- Nicholas James (actor) (born 1982), American actor also credited as Nick James
- Nicholas James (MP) (died 1433), MP for City of London
