= Martin James =

Martin James may refer to:

- Martin James (English footballer) (born 1971)
- Martin James (French footballer) (born 2008)
- Martin James (cricketer) (born 1963), English cricketer
- Martin S. James (1920–2011), English-American art historian

== See also ==
- Marty James, American musician
- James Martin (disambiguation)
