= Brian James =

Brian James may refer to:

- Brian James (soccer) (born 1993), American soccer player
- Brian James (guitarist) (1951–2025), British punk guitarist, founding member of the Damned
- Brian Girard James, better known as Road Dogg (born 1969), American professional wrestler
- Brian James (rugby league) (1943–2020), Australian rugby league footballer
- Brian James (actor) (1918–2009), Australian actor
- Brian James (basketball) (born 1956), American basketball coach
- Brian James (cricketer, born 1934) (1934–2000), English cricketer
- Brian James (cricketer, born 1941) (1941–2002), English cricketer
- Brian James (cricketer, born 1982), Zimbabwean cricketer
- Brian d'Arcy James (born 1968), American actor and musician
- Brian R. James (born 1974), American game designer and software engineer
- Brian James (priest) (1930–2013), Church in Wales priest

== See also ==
- Brion James (1945–1999), American actor
