= Gordon James =

Gordon James may refer to:

- Gordon James (actor) (1877–1949), English actor
- Gordon James (priest) (1922–2000), Archdeacon of Margam
- Gordon C. James, American political consultant
