= Evan James =

Evan James may refer to:

- Evan James (poet) (1809–1878), composer of the Welsh national anthem
- Evan James (rugby) (1869–1901), Welsh rugby international
- Evan James (civil servant) (1846–1923), of the Indian Civil Service
- Evan James (cricketer) (1918–1989), Welsh cricketer
- H. Evan James (1865–1951), British Olympic fencer
- Evan James (soccer) (born 1990), Canadian soccer player
- Evan James (writer), American writer
