= Oliver James =

Oliver James may refer to:

- Oliver James (actor) (born 1980), English musician, singer, songwriter and actor
- Oliver James (cricketer) (born 1990), Welsh cricketer
- Oliver James (footballer) (born 1987), English professional footballer
- Oliver James (psychologist) (born 1953), pop psychologist, author and television presenter
- Oliver James (rower) (born 1990), Paralympic rower
- Ollie Murray James (1871–1918), American politician

== See also ==
- James Oliver (disambiguation)
- "Oliver James", a song by Fleet Foxes, from the 2008 album Fleet Foxes
