= Philip James (disambiguation) =

Philip James (1890–1975) was an American composer, conductor and music educator.

Philip James may also refer to:

- Philip James (nutritionist) (1938–2023), British researcher in nutrition
- Philip J. K. James (born 1978), British entrepreneur, adventurer and CEO of Penrose Hill
- Philip Seaforth James (1914–2001), barrister, academic, author and soldier
- Phil Nyokai James (born 1954), teacher, performer and avant-garde composer

== See also ==
- James (surname)
