= Eddie James (disambiguation) =

Eddie James (1961–2025) was an American murderer and sex offender.

Eddie or Ed James may also refer to:

== Arts and entertainment ==
- Ed James (DJ) (born 1976), British radio DJ
- Ed James (writer) (1908–1995), American writer and creator of the U.S. sitcom Father Knows Best
- Ed James (Jurassic Park), a fictional character in the Jurassic Park franchise

== Sports ==
- Eddie James (Canadian football) (1907–1958), Canadian football player
- Eddie James (rugby union) (born 2002), Welsh rugby player
- Eddy James (1874–1937), Australian rules footballer

== See also ==
- Edward James (disambiguation)
- Ted James (disambiguation)
