= Ben James (disambiguation) =

Ben James (born 2003) is an American professional golfer.

Ben James may also refer to:

- Ben James, vocalist for The Oak Ridge Boys
- Ben James-Ellis (born 1988), English actor

== See also ==
- Benjamin James (disambiguation)
