= Syd James (footballer, born 1898) =

Australian rules footballer

Personal information
- Full name: Sydney Harold James
- Born: 7 April 1898
- Died: 12 August 1969 (aged 71)

Playing career^{1}
Years	Club	Games (Goals)
1919	Geelong	5 (1)
- ^{1} Playing statistics correct to the end of 1919.

Sydney Harold James (7 April 1898 – 12 August 1969) was an Australian rules footballer who played with Geelong in the Victorian Football League (VFL).

He was the brother of Geelong footballers Frederick William "Fred" James (1884–1948) and Leslie Joseph James (1890–1917).
