= Hugh James =

Hugh James may refer to:

- Hugh James (footballer) (1890–1967), Australian rules footballer
- Hugh James (physician) (1750–1797), Scottish physician and surgeon
- Hugh James (RAF officer) (1922–2015), Welsh aviator
