= Edward James (disambiguation) =

Edward James (1907–1984) was a British poet and art patron.

Edward James may also refer to:

- Edward James (barrister) (1807–1867), English barrister
- Edward James (cricketer) (1896–1975), Welsh cricketer
- Edward James (historian) (born 1947), Professor of medieval history at University College Dublin
- Edward James (judge) (1757–1841), judge and politician in Nova Scotia
- Edward James (martyr) (c. 1557–1588), English Catholic priest and martyr
- Edward James (Nova Scotia politician) (1825–1909), politician in Nova Scotia, Canada
- Edward James (priest) (1569–1610?), Welsh priest and translator
- Edward Holton James (1873–1954), American socialist
- Ed James (footballer), Wales footballer

== See also ==
- Eddie James (disambiguation)
- Ted James (disambiguation)
