= Kevan James =

English former cricketer (born 1961)

Personal information
- Full name: Kevan David James
- Born: 18 March 1961 (age 65); Lambeth, London, England
- Batting: Left-handed
- Bowling: Left-arm medium-fast

Domestic team information
- Years: Team
- 1985–1999: Hampshire
- 1982/83–1984/85: Wellington
- 1980–1984: Middlesex

Career statistics
Competition	First-class	List A
Matches	225	254
Runs scored	8,526	2,459
Batting average	30.45	19.83
100s/50s	10/42	0/7
Top score	162	66
Balls bowled	24,687	10,958
Wickets	395	247
Bowling average	31.91	31.28
5 wickets in innings	11	2
10 wickets in match	1	0
Best bowling	8/49	6/35
Catches/stumpings	78/–	69/–
- Source: Cricinfo, 17 May 2011

Kevan David James (born 18 March 1961) is an English former first-class cricketer who spent most of his career with Hampshire whom he won the NatWest Trophy and Benson & Hedges Cup with in the early 1990s.

He was born at Lambeth in 1961 and educated at the Edmonton County School, in the London Borough of Enfield.

A middle-order batsman and left-arm seam bowler, he toured Australia and the West Indies with Young England before forging a successful career with Hampshire. He also played some first-class cricket for Wellington in New Zealand. James is perhaps best known for a game against India in 1996 when he took a record equaling four wickets in four balls, and followed it up with a hundred later in the match. These Indian wickets included Sachin Tendulkar and Rahul Dravid. The Cricinfo report from the match claimed that no one, in the history of cricket, had taken four wickets in four balls and scored a hundred in the same game. The second player to have accomplished a 4-in-4 and a century was Kelly Smuts, for Eastern Province (EP) against Boland at Paarl in 2015–16.

His brother, Martin, played List A cricket for Hertfordshire.

Since at least 2003, James has been reporting on Hampshire for BBC Radio Solent and is currently a Hampshire commentator for the BBC's ball-by-ball radio coverage of county cricket. He is known for his deep voice.
