= Jason Kyle (politician) =

American engineer and politician

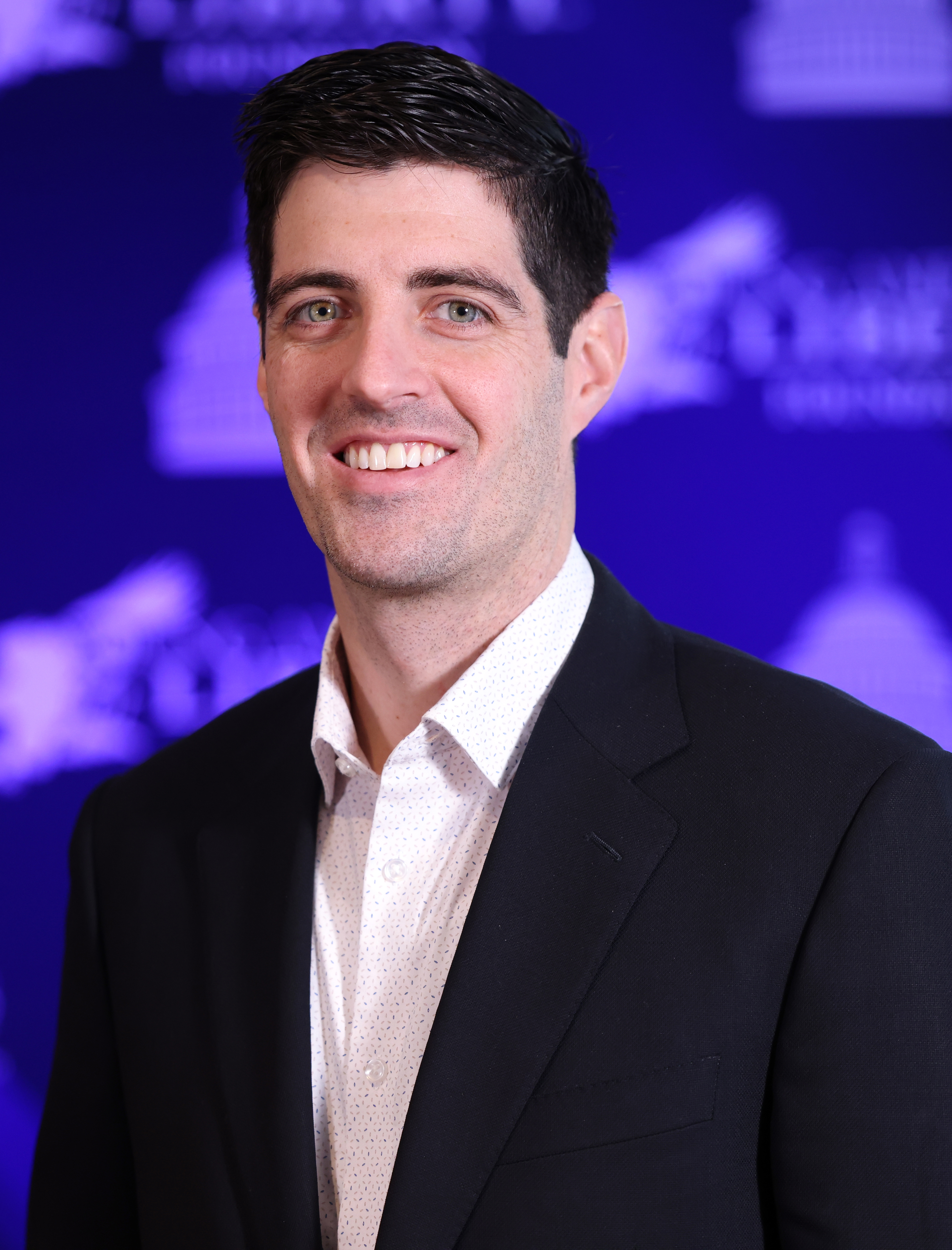
- Kyle in 2024

Member of the Utah House of Representatives from the 8th district
- Incumbent
- Assumed office January 1, 2023
- Preceded by: Steve Waldrip
- Succeeded by: Kim James (elect)

Personal details
- Born: Utah, U.S.
- Party: Republican
- Education: University of Utah (BS)

Jason B. Kyle is an American engineer and politician serving as a member of the Utah House of Representatives for the 8th district. Elected in November 2022, he assumed office on January 1, 2023.

== Early life and education ==
Kyle was born and raised in Utah. He earned a Bachelor of Science degree in chemical engineering from the University of Utah.

== Career ==
From 2010 to 2017, Kyle worked for Varian Medical Systems as a manufacturing engineer, environmental manager, and safety manager. He joined the Varex Imaging Corporation as an environmental safety manager in 2017 and became a production manager in 2019. He was elected to the Utah House of Representatives in November 2022.

At the 2026 Utah House of Representatives election, he lost to Democrat Kim James.
