= Don James =

Don or Donald James may refer to:

- Don James (American football) (1932–2013), American college football coach
- Don James (executive), Nintendo executive
- Don James (rugby union) (born 1964), American rugby union player
- Donald James (1931–2008), English novelist and television writer
- Donald James (surfer) (died 1996), American surfer
- Chris James (baseball) (Donald Chris James, born 1962), American baseball player
- Donald M. James (born 1949), American businessman
