= Deborah James =

Deborah James may refer to:

- Deborah James (activist) (born 1971), American activist
- Deborah James (anthropologist) (born 1954), South African anthropologist
- Deborah James (journalist) (1981–2022), English journalist and podcast host
- Deborah Lee James (born 1958), American public servant who served as the 23rd Secretary of the Air Force
- Deborah James (sprinter) (born c. 1964), NCAA champion sprinter for the Nebraska Cornhuskers track and field team
