= Arthur Lorne James =

Canadian air force officer (1903–1964)

- Born: Montreal, Quebec
- Military career
- Allegiance: Canada
- Branch: Royal Canadian Air Force
- Service years: 1924–1957 (33 years)
- Rank: Air Vice-Marshal

Air Vice-Marshal Arthur Lorne James CBE (September 1903 – 1964) was a Canadian air force officer who was instrumental in the evolution of the Royal Canadian Air Force during World War II and the early years of the Cold War, leading to its close cooperation with the United States Air Force in the defence of North America.

Born in Montreal in September 1903, James was educated there and attended McGill University, where he graduated with a B.Sc. in civil engineering. He enlisted in the RCAF during its formative year in 1924. He attained the rank of sergeant in the technical branch before being commissioned as a pilot officer in 1926 upon earning his pilot wings. Throughout the rest of the 1920s he was active in many of the RCAF's early missions including forest fire patrols, aerial photography, and test flying. James was sent to London in 1929 for post-graduate studies in Aeronautical Engineering and in 1937 he returned to attend RAF Staff College, Andover.

During the early years of World War II, James commanded several British Commonwealth Air Training Plan (BCATP) schools at various RCAF stations across Canada. In 1943 he was assigned to special duties at Canadian Joint Staff, Washington. On January 1, 1945, he was made a Commander of the Order of the British Empire (CBE) by King George VI. He returned from Washington to Ottawa for a posting at RCAF Headquarters where he was appointed Director of Organization, then Director of Repair, and Air Member for Research and Development. He was promoted to Air Vice-Marshal in October 1945.

In 1945 Air Vice-Marshal James was one of the first senior military officers in Canada to call for the creation of dedicated facility to house the collection of the Canadian War Museum. In January 1947 he was appointed Air Member for Technical Services and in November 1949 he became Air Member for Air Plans and was appointed as Air Member to the Permanent Joint Board on Defence; in these capacities he was instrumental in the development of the CF-100 Canuck. On June 5, 1948, he was made Commander, Legion of Merit (CLM) by the Government of the United States of America.

Air Vice-Marshal James gave the departing word to personnel of No. 426 Squadron RCAF on July 25, 1950, upon their participation in Operation Hawk, the RCAF codeword for the Korean Airlift. On August 1, 1951, he was promoted to Air Officer Commanding, Air Defence Command, RCAF. He was awarded the Queen Elizabeth II Coronation Medal on October 23, 1953, while still AOC, ADC.

Air Vice-Marshal James retired in 1957 and became president and general manager of Bristol Aero Engines Limited. The RCAF school for dependent children at RCAF Station St. Margarets was named "James Park School" in his honour. He died in 1964 and in 1966 the post office at RCAF Station St. Margarets was renamed to "Post Office James Park" in his honour as well.

James's citation for the CBE reads as follows:

This officer has rendered untiring and devoted service to the Royal Canadian Air Force over a long period of years. Since the outbreak of war, he has successively filled high executive positions in both Canada and the United States. This officer's display of energy, leadership and integrity, combined with a pleasing personality, has been an inspiration to all those with whom he comes in contact. His diligence, devotion to duty, keenness and conscientiousness in his every effort, and his ability and industry to complete the work in hand, have combined to make him an outstanding officer.

His citation for the Legion of Merit reads as follows:

Air Vice Marshal A.L. James, Royal Canadian Air Force, performed exceptionally meritorious service from November 1942 to December 1943. He served with marked distinction as Senior Air Staff Officer at Canadian Joint Staff Headquarters, Washington. His vital interest in all matters relating to cooperation between the United States Armed Forces and the Royal Canadian Air Force gained for him the highest regard of those with whom he so selflessly served. Air Vice Marshal James not only served on many highly important committees, but his pleasing but forceful personality contributed greatly to the fostering of goodwill and the interchange of intelligence which was of mutual value to both countries in the successful prosecution of the war.
