= Jay James =

Jay James may refer to:

- Jason James (musician) (born 1981), Welsh musician, bassist for the Welsh Metalcore band Bullet for My Valentine from 2003 to 2015
- Jay James (singer) (born 1983), full name Jay James Picton, Welsh singer and UK The X Factor contestant in its 11th series

== See also ==
- Jason James (disambiguation)
