= Paul James =

Paul James may refer to:

- Paul James (academic) (born 1958), professor and writer on globalization and social theory
- Paul James (actor) (born 1981), American actor
- Paul James (basketball) (born 1964), British professional basketball player and coach
- Paul James (Canadian musician) (born 1951), blues guitarist
- Paul James (gardener), host of American television program Gardening by the Yard
- Paul James (rugby union) (born 1982), Wales international rugby union player
- Paul James (soccer) (born 1963), Canadian association football (soccer) player and coach
- Paul James (sportscaster) (1931–2018), American sports announcer
- Paul James (motorsport), British Formula One and motorsports mechanic and motorsport executive
- Paul James, a pen name used by American banker James Warburg (1896–1969) when writing songs with his wife, Kay Swift
- Paul James, British writer; creator of the comedy character Constance, Lady Crabtree
- Paul Moon James (1780–1854), English banker and lawyer
