= Justin James =

Justin James may refer to:

== Music ==
- Justin James (musician), American singer-songwriter
- Justin James (music producer) (born 1975), Canadian electronic musician, DJ, and producer
- Justin James (music director), Indian composer, singer and guitarist in Malayalam cinema

== Sports ==
- Justin James (baseball) (born 1981), former professional baseball player
- Justin James (basketball) (born 1997), American basketball player
- Justin James (golfer) (born 1990), American golfer

== See also ==
- James Justin, English professional footballer
