= Jeremy James =

Jeremy James may refer to:

- Jeremy James (bishop), Anglican bishop in Australia
- Jeremy James (sculptor) (born 1964), British sculptor
- Jeremy James (singer/songwriter) (born 1977), American musician
- Jeremy James, presenter of TV shows including The Master Game
- Jeremy James, a character in the novel Adventures with Jeremy James

== See also ==
- Jerry James (disambiguation)
