= Joshua James =

Joshua or Josh James may refer to:

- Joshua James (actor), British actor
- Joshua James (cricketer) (born 2001), Trinidadian cricketer
- Joshua James (folk singer), American rock and folk musician
- Joshua James (lifesaver) (1826–1902), American sea captain; commander of civilian life-saving crews
- Josh James (born 1973), American entrepreneur, founder of Domo and co-founder of Omniture
- Josh James (baseball) (born 1993), baseball player
- Josh James (singer) (born 1990), English singer born James Dubovie
- Joshua James, founder of Zig Media
