= James Joseph =

James Joseph may refer to:

- Carl James Joseph, also known as The Jesus Guy
- James A. Joseph (1935–2023), American diplomat
- James R. Joseph, Pennsylvania Adjutant General of Military and Veterans Affairs
- James Joseph (American football) (born 1967), American football running back
- James Joseph (cyclist) (born 1957), Guyanese cyclist
- James Joseph (footballer)
- James Joseph (curler) (born 1962), American wheelchair curler, 2006, 2010 and 2014 Paralympian
- Jamie Joseph (born 1969), rugby union player
- Jim Joseph, see United States Football League
- Jimmy Jean-Joseph (born 1972), French athlete

== See also ==
- Joseph James (disambiguation)
