= Les James =

Australian rules footballer (1890–1917)

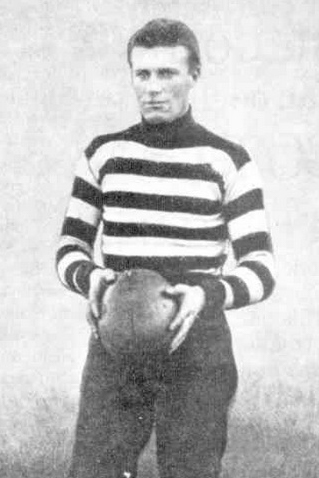
- James in 1910

Personal information
- Full name: Leslie Joseph James
- Born: 29 June 1890; Geelong, Victoria
- Died: 22 October 1917 (aged 27); Passchendaele salient, Belgium
- Original team: Mercantile
- Position: Rover / Wing / Forward

Playing career^{1}
Years	Club	Games (Goals)
1909–11, 1913–15	Geelong	72 (14)
- ^{1} Playing statistics correct to the end of 1915.

Leslie Joseph James (29 June 1890 – 22 October 1917), also known as "Jack James", was an Australian rules footballer who played with Geelong in the Victorian Football League.

He was killed in action in World War I. He died on the Passchendaele salient in 1917.

== Family ==
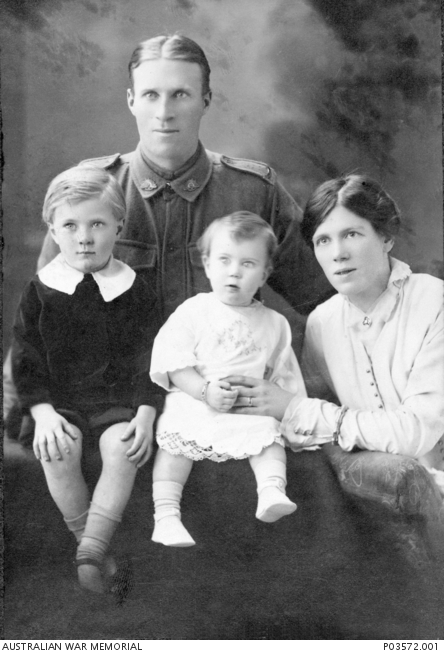
James and his family in 1916

Fifth of the eighth children of Joseph James (1856–1902), and Martha James (1857–1930), née Smith, Leslie Joseph James was born at Geelong on 29 June 1890.

He married Alice May Ward (1888–1963) in 1913. They had two children: Leslie Thomas James (1913–1979), and Iris May James (1915–1993).

Two of his brothers, Frederick William "Fred" James (1884–1948) and Sydney Harold "Syd" James (1898–1969), also played with Geelong: Fred, played two games in 1908, and Syd played four games in 1919.

== Football ==
He played 72 senior games with Geelong.

== Death ==
He was killed in action on 22 October 1917.

== See also ==
- List of Victorian Football League players who died on active service
