= Kevin James (disambiguation) =

Kevin James (born 1965) is an American actor and comedian. Kevin James may also refer to:

- Kevin James (bowls) (born 1984), Welsh lawn bowler
- Kevin James (broadcaster) (born 1963), American radio presenter and political candidate
- Kevin James (cricketer) (born 1987), West Indian cricketer
- Kevin James (English footballer) (born 1980), footballer for Dulwich Hamlet
- Kevin James (magician) (born 1962), French-born American magician
- Kevin James (Scottish footballer) (born 1975), footballer for Ayr United
- Kevin James, convicted on charges of terrorism relating to the 2005 Los Angeles bomb plot
