= Steve James =

Steve, Steven or Stephen James may refer to:

== Sports ==
- Steve James (cricketer) (born 1967), English cricketer and journalist
- Steve James (footballer) (born 1949), English football player
- Stephen James (footballer) (born 1965), Australian rules footballer for Richmond
- Steve James (rugby) (born 1960), Australian rugby union player and rugby league coach
- Steve James (snooker player) (born 1961), English snooker player
- Steve Armstrong, real name Steve James (born 1965), American professional wrestler

== Arts and entertainment ==
- Steve James (actor) (1952–1993), American actor
- Steve James (film producer) (born 1955), American producer and director
- Steven James (born 1969), American author

=== Music ===
- Steve James (blues musician) (1950–2023), American blues musician
- Steve James (Christian musician) (born 1953), English-born contemporary Christian musician
- Steve James (DJ) (born 1998), American record producer, writer, and DJ

== Other ==
- Stephen James (model) (born 1990), British model and former footballer

== See also ==
- Stephan James (disambiguation)
