= Steve Waldrip =

American attorney, businessman, and politician

Member of the Utah House of Representatives from the 8th district
- In office January 1, 2019 – December 31, 2022
- Preceded by: Gage Froerer
- Succeeded by: Jason Kyle

Personal details
- Born: Orange County, California, U.S.
- Party: Republican
- Education: Brigham Young University (BA); University of Utah (JD); University of Washington (LLM)

Steve Waldrip is an American attorney, businessman, and politician who served as a member of the Utah House of Representatives from the 8th district. Elected in 2018, he assumed office in 2019.

== Early life and education ==
Waldrip was born and raised in Orange County, California. His father was an attorney and judge and his mother was a homemaker. Waldrip earned a Bachelor of Arts degree in English from Brigham Young University, a Juris Doctor from the S.J. Quinney College of Law at the University of Utah, and a Master of Laws in taxation law from the University of Washington School of Law.

== Career ==
Since graduating from law school, Waldrip has worked as an attorney and real estate consultant and developer. In addition to operating a private real estate firm, Waldrip is a partner of the Rocky Mountain Homes Fund. Waldrip was elected to the Utah House of Representatives in 2018, defeating Jason Kyle in the Republican primary and Deana Froerer in the November general election.

In December 2023, Utah Governor Spencer J. Cox named Waldrip as Senior Advisor for Housing Strategy and Innovation. In 2026, the state of Utah created a new housing division and Waldrip's role expanded, gaining him the additional title of State Housing Coordinator. As of mid-2026, Waldrip leads the Division of House and Community Development, created by HB68 and passed by the Utah Legislature.
