= Benjamin James =

Benjamin James may refer to:

- Benjamin F. James (1885–1961), Republican member of the U.S. House of Representatives from Pennsylvania
- Benjamin James (American football) (1912–2015), head football coach for the Dickinson College Red Devils, 1942
- Benjamin James (Nova Scotia politician), farmer and political figure in Nova Scotia
- B. O. James (Benjamin Oliver James, 1883–1956), American politician in Virginia
- Ben James (born 2003), American professional golfer
- Ben. S. James (Benjamin Shyamal James) Prince Of Pearl Beach
