= Daniel James =

Daniel James or Dan James may refer to:

== Arts and entertainment ==
- Daniel James (Gwyrosydd) (1848–1920), Welsh poet and hymn-writer
- Daniel Lewis James (1911–1988), American novelist
- Daniel James (record producer) (born 1975), Australian music producer and songwriter
- Daniel James (singer), English singer, stage name of Colin Heywood

== Military ==
- Daniel James Jr. (1920–1978), African American USAF general
- Daniel James III (1945–2017), United States Air Force general
- Daniel James (British Army soldier) (born 1962), British Army corporal and interpreter, convicted of espionage

== Sports ==
- Daniel James (boxer) (1922–2006), boxer from Trinidad & Tobago known as Gentle Daniel
- Dan James (American football) (1937–1987), American football player
- Daniel James (fighter) (born 1981), American mixed martial artist
- Daniel James (footballer) (born 1997), Welsh footballer

== Others ==
- Daniel James (businessman) (1801–1876), American businessman
- Daniel Willis James (1832–1907), American businessman
- Daniel James (historian) (born 1948), British historian and expert in Peronism
- Daniel James (game developer) (born 1971), British-Canadian video game developer
