= Jason James =

Jason James may refer to:

- Jason James (basketball) (born 1977), American college basketball coach
- Jason James (director), British director and Japan expert
- Jason James (EastEnders), fictional character in EastEnders, played by Joseph Millson
- Jason James (musician) (born 1981), Welsh musician

== See also ==
- Jay James (disambiguation)
