= Matthew James =

Matthew James or Mathew James may refer to:

- Mathew James (umpire) (born 1974), Australian rules football umpire
- Matthew James (actor) (born 1973), American actor
- Matthew James (politician) (born 1955), American politician from Virginia
- Matty James (Matthew Lee James, born 1991), English footballer for Leicester City
- Matthew C. James (1857/58–1934), marine architect, poet and songwriter from Walker, Newcastle upon Tyne

== See also ==
- Matt James (disambiguation)
