= Percy James =

Welsh-born English footballer

Personal information
- Full name: Percy George Burge James
- Date of birth: 9 March 1917
- Place of birth: Rhondda, Glamorgan, Wales
- Date of death: June 1993 (aged 76)
- Position: Left winger

Senior career*
Years	Team	Apps	(Gls)
- Oxford City
1949	Luton Town	2	(1)
- Worcester City
- * Club domestic league appearances and goals

Percy George Burge James (9 March 1917 – June 1993) was an English amateur footballer and minor counties cricketer.

James was born in the Rhondda. He began his career with Oxford City before the Second World War. He had a brief professional football career, making two appearances and scoring one goal in the Football League for Luton Town in 1949. He later joined Worcester City as a player-manager. He played amateur international football for Wales.

James also played cricket at minor counties level for Oxfordshire as a leg break bowler between 1938 and 1951, making 27 appearances in the Minor Counties Championship. He died in June 1993.
