= Sandy James =

American softball player (born 1990)

Personal information
- Nationality: American
- Born: 1990 (age 35–36) Dallas, Texas
- Height: 5 ft 9 in (1.75 m)

Sport
- Country: United States
- Sport: Softball
- College team: Texas Tech Red Raiders

Sandra James (born 1990) is an American softball player. She attended Sabine High School in Gladewater, Texas. She later attended Angelo State University for one year, before transferring to Texas Tech University, where she played first base and catcher for the Texas Tech Red Raiders softball team. She holds the single-season record for home runs at both Angelo State and Texas Tech.
