= Mark James =

Mark James may refer to:

- Mark James (golfer) (born 1953), English golfer
- Mark James (rower), New Zealand rower
- Mark James (songwriter) (1940–2024), American songwriter
- Mark Andrew James, American conductor and oboist
- Mark James, a fictional character in the Lorien Legacies series
- Marc St. James, a fictional character in Ugly Betty and web-series Mode After Hours
- Mark James Kilroy (1968–1989), American student killed in a human sacrifice ritual in Mexico
- Mark Howard James, aka The 45 King (1961–2023), American hip hop producer
- Mark James (British cleric) (1845–1898), Canon of Bermuda Cathedral
