= Larry James (disambiguation) =

Larry James (1947–2008) was an American Olympic sprinter.

Larry James may also refer to:

- Larry D. James, Lt. General in the United States Air Force
- Larry C. James, former chief psychologist at Guantanamo, and author of Fixing Hell
- Larry M. James, President and CEO of CitySquare
