= Rosetta James =

American community activist (1925–2019)

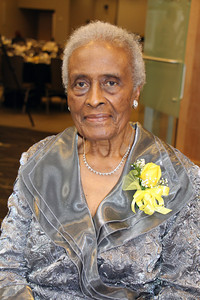
Rosetta James

Rosetta James (October 31, 1925 – October 11, 2019) was a community volunteer in the Huntsville-Madison County (Ala.) area.

== Biography ==
James moved to Huntsville, Ala. in 1973, after living in Long Island, N.Y., for 27 years. A native of Akron, Ala., in Hale County, James grew up in Alabama’s Black Belt.

She first worked part-time for the Alabama Cooperative Extension System Madison County Extension Office while supporting the business of her late husband, McKinley James. Her work in landscaping afforded her the opportunity to meet many people in the Huntsville-Madison County vicinity. James became involved in local civic, educational, religious, and political activities and causes. Her efforts led to her being included on various boards and committees.

James worked with children, the elderly, and the incarcerated as a lay minister to female jail inmates. She was a member of First Missionary Baptist Church in Huntsville, Ala., and she received over 50 honors, awards, and commendations from organizations and agencies, including Alabama A&M University, the NAACP and Greater Huntsville Chapter of 100 Black Men of America (2017). A "Rosetta James Room" has been named in her honor at First Missionary Baptist Church (Huntsville, Ala.) and the Huntsville Bible College.

James was a suffrage advocate, having registered thousands of local voters in registration drives. The Madison County Chapter of the Alabama Democratic Conference renamed its annual breakfast “The Rosetta James Membership Breakfast” for her efforts.

As a Court-Appointed Juvenile Advocate (CAJA), James worked with abused and neglected children in the juvenile court system. She obtained tuition assistance for promising at-risk students.

== Foundation ==
The Rosetta James Foundation is a non-profit organization. The annual ‘Rosetta James Honoring Our Elders’ celebration honors local citizens who are at least 70 years old and still active area volunteers. Foundation resources provide scholarships annually to local college students who are involved in the community as volunteers. An endowed scholarship in the amount of $10,000 was presented to Alabama A&M University in March 2007 from the Foundation, which currently awards 11 merit scholarships each year.

== Affiliations ==
- AARP
- Alabama Citizens for Constitution Reform
- Church Women United– Chairwoman, Nominating Committee
- Congregational Care– Lay Minister
- First Missionary Baptist Church – Active Member
- HELPLINE– Board Member
- Huntsville City Schools
- Huntsville-Madison County Senior Center– Board Member
- Joint Missionary Society
- Madison County Board of Elections– Clerk
- Madison County Day Care– Board Member
- Madison County Democratic Women
- Madison County, Alabama Democratic Party
- Missionary Circle #3- Chairwoman
- Missionary Work for Africa– Local Coordinator
- Mustard Seed Ministry
- NAACP
- Pathfinders– Board Member

== Sources ==
Congressional Record Volume 151, Number 134 (Thursday, October 20, 2005), Page E2144, From the Congressional Record Online through the Government Printing Office, www.gpo.gov- Tribute to Rosetta James: Hon. Robert E. (BUD) Cramer, Jr.

Former U.S. Representative Bud Cramer. Tribute to Rosetta James. Capitolwords Volume 151, Number 134. October 20, 2005. http://capitolwords.org/date/2005/10/20/E2144-2_tribute-to-rosetta-james/

Rosetta James Foundation. www.facebook.com/Rosetta JamesFoundation/

Rosetta James Foundation website: http://rosettajamesfoundation.org/

Speakin’ Out News. The Rosetta James Foundation Presents “Showdown” with Washington Post Journalist Wil Haygood, Author of “The Butler” (February 2017). https://www.speakinoutweeklynews.com

The Valley Weekly. Rosetta James Foundation “Honoring Our Elders” at Annual Gala. March 6, 2015 - http://www.valleyweeklyllc.com/ValleyWeekly03062015V1N26.pdf.

Women’s Economic Development Corporation Foundation (2006). The 2006 Honorees: Community & Public Service – Rosetta James. http://wedcfoundation.org/women-honoring-women/past-honorees/
