= Paul James (motorsport) =

British motorsports executive and mechanic

- Employer: McLaren Racing
- Known for: Formula One engineer
- Title: TPC Events Director

Paul James is a British Formula One and motorsports mechanic and motorsport executive. He is currently the TPC (Testing Previous Cars) Events Director for the McLaren Formula One team.

== Career ==
James began his career in motorsport at a young age, initially working with the Mazda Rally Team Europe before gaining experience with Onyx Grand Prix, Benetton Formula and in North America’s IndyCar World Series. He joined McLaren in 1995, first contributing to the McLaren F1 road car programme before moving to the Formula One team in 1997.

Over the following decade, James worked closely with drivers including David Coulthard, Juan Pablo Montoya and Lewis Hamilton. He served as Hamilton’s number-one mechanic during his 2008 World Championship-winning season. James was promoted to Chief Mechanic in 2012 and, at the start of the 2017 season, was appointed Team Manager. In that role, he was responsible for overseeing race team operations, managing logistics and personnel, and acting as a key liaison with the FIA on sporting matters.

He later transitioned into McLaren’s heritage and testing activities, becoming Director of Testing of Previous Cars, where he oversees the running and operational management of McLaren’s historic and non-current Formula One machinery in official TPC programmes.
