= Joseph James =

Joseph or Joe James may refer to:

- Joe James (footballer) (1910–1993), English football centre half for Brentford
- Joe James (racing driver) (1925–1952), American racecar driver
- Joe James (American football) (1934–2015), American gridiron football coach in Texas
- Joe James (soccer) (born 1961), retired English-born American soccer defender
- Joe Nathan James Jr. (1972–2022), American convicted murderer executed in Alabama
- Joe James, African-American man hanged in Illinois following the Springfield race riot of 1908
- Joe James, British vocalist of the rock band Blitz Kids
- Joe James, American jazz pianist, member of the Kid Thomas Band and the Preservation Hall Jazz Band
- Joseph James (footballer) (born 2006), English footballer
- Joseph Caulfield James (1860–1925), English teacher and principal tutor to Prince Vajiravudh of Siam
- Joseph Stephen James (1849–1931), American lawyer, community leader, singer and composer
- Joseph James and Joseph James Jr., Kansa-Osage-French interpreters on the Kansas and Indian Territory frontier

People with related names

- Bob Armstrong (Joseph Melton James, 1939–2020), American professional wrestler
- Scott Armstrong (wrestler) (Joseph Scott James, born 1959), American professional wrestler and son of Bob Armstrong
- Jo James, British vocalist who has performed with electronic dance music duo Flip & Fill
- Joey James (Joseph James Thomas, born 1987), member of the British boy bank Rough Copy
- Joy James, American political philosopher, academic, and author

== See also ==
- James Joseph (disambiguation)
