= Fred James =

Fred James may refer to:

- Fred J. James, American architect
- Fred James (Australian footballer) (1884–1948), Australian rules footballer
- Fred James (Canadian football) (1945–2016), Canadian rules football defensive linemen
