= Matt James =

Matt James may refer to:

- Matt James (game designer) (born 1981), American game designer
- Matt James (illustrator) (born c. 1974), Canadian illustrator
- Matt James (rugby league) (born 1987), British rugby league footballer
- Matt James (television personality) (born 1991), American television personality
- Matt James (TV presenter) (born 1975), British host of shows such as The City Gardener

== See also ==
- Matthew James (disambiguation)
