= Jill James =

American biochemist and autism researcher

Sandra Jill James
- Education: Mills College, University of California, Los Angeles
- Scientific career
- Fields: Autism, metabolism
- Workplaces: Arkansas Children's Hospital
- Thesis: Alterations in macrophage and T cell immune activity in the zinc deficient mouse (1986)

Sandra Jill James is a retired American biochemist and autism researcher who studied metabolic autism biomarkers. She worked at Arkansas Children's Hospital Research Institute, where she was the director of the Metabolic Genomics Laboratory, as well as the University of Arkansas for Medical Sciences' department of pediatrics, where she began working in 2002. She was also a member of the Autism Speaks Treatment Advisory Board.

James' research focused on the role of epigenetics in autism, as well as the effectiveness of supplements as a treatment for autism and the potential existence of abnormal metabolism in autistic children. This research was previously funded by a 5-year grant from the National Institutes of Health entitled "Metabolic biomarkers of autism: predictive potential and genetic susceptibility", as well as by a grant from Autism Speaks.

James has falsely speculated that the thiomersal used as a preservative in some vaccines is potentially harmful to the human brain and that prophylactic supplements may protect against such harm preceding vaccination.

== Education ==
James obtained her bachelor's degree in biology from Mills College in 1962, followed by an M.S. and Ph.D. from the University of California, Los Angeles in 1982 and 1986, respectively.

== Research ==
James, while working at the National Center for Toxicological Research, conducted research on the role of DNA methylation and cancer susceptibility, and also studied metabolic differences in children with Down syndrome. Her studies of children with Down syndrome showed that they have abnormal methionine metabolic pathways.

=== Leukemia ===
James has also researched children diagnosed with leukemia in Fallon, Nevada. She originally received a grant from the United States Environmental Protection Agency to conduct this research in 2004 and presented preliminary results the following year. James speculated that the Fallon children had a metabolic predisposition to develop leukemia when exposed to environmental contaminants. She never published her final results, because she only had 20 blood samples--"not enough to reach a conclusive result."

=== Autism ===
James is best known for her autism-related research. Regarding autism, James' view is that the transsulfuration pathway is disrupted in autistic children, resulting in these children being deficient in glutathione, as well as vitamins such as vitamin B6 and vitamin B12, and that maternal glutathione deficiency may also be a risk factor for autism. She has also claimed that administering these compounds as supplements, as well as methylcobalamin and folinic acid, to autistic children can significantly restore their levels of glutathione and cysteine and may therefore be useful in the treatment of autism. In addition, she has speculated that autistic children possess an impaired methylation capacity and that, according to a study she presented at the 2005 Experimental Biology conference, they have a unique biological "fingerprint" in their blood which neurotypical children lack. With regard to this particular study, James said, "One interpretation of this finding is that children with autism would be less able to detoxify and eliminate these heavy metals." According to the official blog of Autism Speaks, James found that autistic children exhibit abnormal folate metabolism that is detectable by higher levels of plasma homocysteine, adenosine, and S-adenosyl-L-homocysteine in the mothers of these children. Her glutathione-related research has been cited by anti-vaccine activists, such as Robert F. Kennedy, Jr., Dan Olmsted, and David Kirby, as evidence that autistic children lack sufficient glutathione to remove mercury from their bodies and are therefore more susceptible to the toxicity of mercury in vaccines. However, James herself has cautioned against such conclusions, saying they are an overstatement of what her research actually shows; with specific regard to Kirby's claims, she said, "I'm afraid Mr. Kirby is overstating our conclusions -- which did not mention mercury. We simply showed for the first time that children with autism have lower levels of the major intracellular antioxidant, glutathione, which incidentally happens to be the major mechanism for mercury elimination from the body." On March 27, 2012, the Jane Botsford Johnson Foundation awarded a $1.2 million research grant to Arkansas Children's Hospital to fund research into autism biomarkers; this research was to be led by James. At the time the grant was being awarded, Johnson herself said that "Jill James' work at ACHRI holds great promise for the future of autism therapy and prevention."

=== Thiomersal and vaccines ===
In 2005, James co-authored a paper that suggested N-acetylcysteine and glutathione ethyl ester might be useful as prophylactics for those receiving vaccines containing the preservative thiomersal. This suggestion was based on an in-vitro study in which human neuroblastoma and glioblastoma cells were directly exposed to high levels of thiomersal with and without doses of N-acetylcysteine, glutathione ethyl ester and other test substances.

It is scientific consensus that the thiomersal used as a preservative in vaccines is not harmful.
