= Tom James (professor) =

British professor and author (born 1971)

Professor Tom James
- Occupations: Author; Professor

Tom James (born December 15, 1971) is a British professor and author who predominantly writes about commodities. He has published seventeen works in four languages. James has served as Chair Professor at universities in the UK, Korea, India and Singapore. He is a former senior Energy Advisor to the United States Department of Defense and a former member of the United Nations FAO Commodity Risk Management Advisory Group.

James held a chair professorship at the University of Petroleum and Energy Studies in India.

== Early life ==
James began his career in the energy trading department of Mocatta Commercial in the early nineties. Following the first Gulf War, James began mentoring Asian clients in hedging refinery and crude oil margins for petroleum-based products. James moved to Singapore in 1996 and set up a derivatives trading operation for the now-defunct Credit Lyonnais.

== Career ==
In 1999, James set up an online platform for over the counter (OTC) commodities swaps with ICAP. The platform used straight-through data processing, automated risk management, and a mechanism for providing de facto credit clearing controls. James took a role with Crédit Agricole to create a clearing platform for futures, OTC swaps and physical commodities.

== Selected publications ==
James has published seventeen works in four languages and currently has two thousand and seventy-four library holdings.

=== Energy Markets: Price Risk Management and Trading (2002) ===
Energy Price Risk is based on James' experience in the commodity derivatives industry. The text covers risk management strategies, energy complex, crude oil and electricity.

=== Energy Hedging in Asia: Market Structure and Trading Opportunities (2005) ===
In Energy Hedging in Asia, James and co-author Peter C. Fusaro discuss developments in the market structures of the Asian Pacific, such as deregulation and privatisation.

=== Energy & Emissions Markets: Collision or Convergence? (2006) ===
Energy & Emissions Markets discusses the localised experiences of emissions trading, the legislative agendas shaping pollutions markets and speculation about the future of these markets.

=== Commodity Market Trading and Investment: A Practitioner's Guide to the Markets (2016) ===
Commodity Market Trading and Investment analyses and explains methodologies and techniques used in international commodity management. Using trading methodologies and financial instruments, James explains how to navigate commodity markets successfully. The book's initial chapters describe and contextualise the current commodity trading markets, whilst the latter chapters reflect on the psychology of market trading.

=== "Deep Space Commodities: Exploration, Production and Trading" (2018) ===
In Deep Space Commodities, James discusses the possibility of harvesting resources from space. The book explained the practical challenges of reaping resources from space, including a section on how to negotiate with aliens. The book made a case for the economic benefits of asteroid mining and attempted to quantify the value of mining-specific asteroids but fell short of explaining how asteroid miners might calculate that profit.
