= Brian James (Zimbabwean cricketer) =

Zimbabwean cricketer (born 1982)

Personal information
- Full name: Brian William James
- Born: 21 October 1982 (age 44); Mutare, Manicaland, Zimbabwe
- Batting: Left-handed
- Bowling: Right-arm medium

Domestic team information
- Years: Team
- 1999/2000–2000/01: Manicaland

Career statistics
| Competition | FC |
|---|---|
| Matches | 3 |
| Runs scored | 6 |
| Batting average | 3.00 |
| 100s/50s | 0/0 |
| Top score | 3 |
| Catches/stumpings | 1/– |
- Source: ESPNcricinfo, 15 July 2021

Brian William James (born 21 October 1982) is a former Zimbabwean cricketer. A left-handed batsman and right-arm medium pace bowler, he played three first-class matches for Manicaland between 2000 and 2001.
