= Norman James =

Norman James may refer to:

- Norman James (broadcaster), sports broadcaster
- Norman James (footballer) (1908–1985), English footballer
- Norman B. James (1872–1963), Alberta politician
- Norman L. James (1840–1918), Wisconsin politician
