= Korean Airlift =

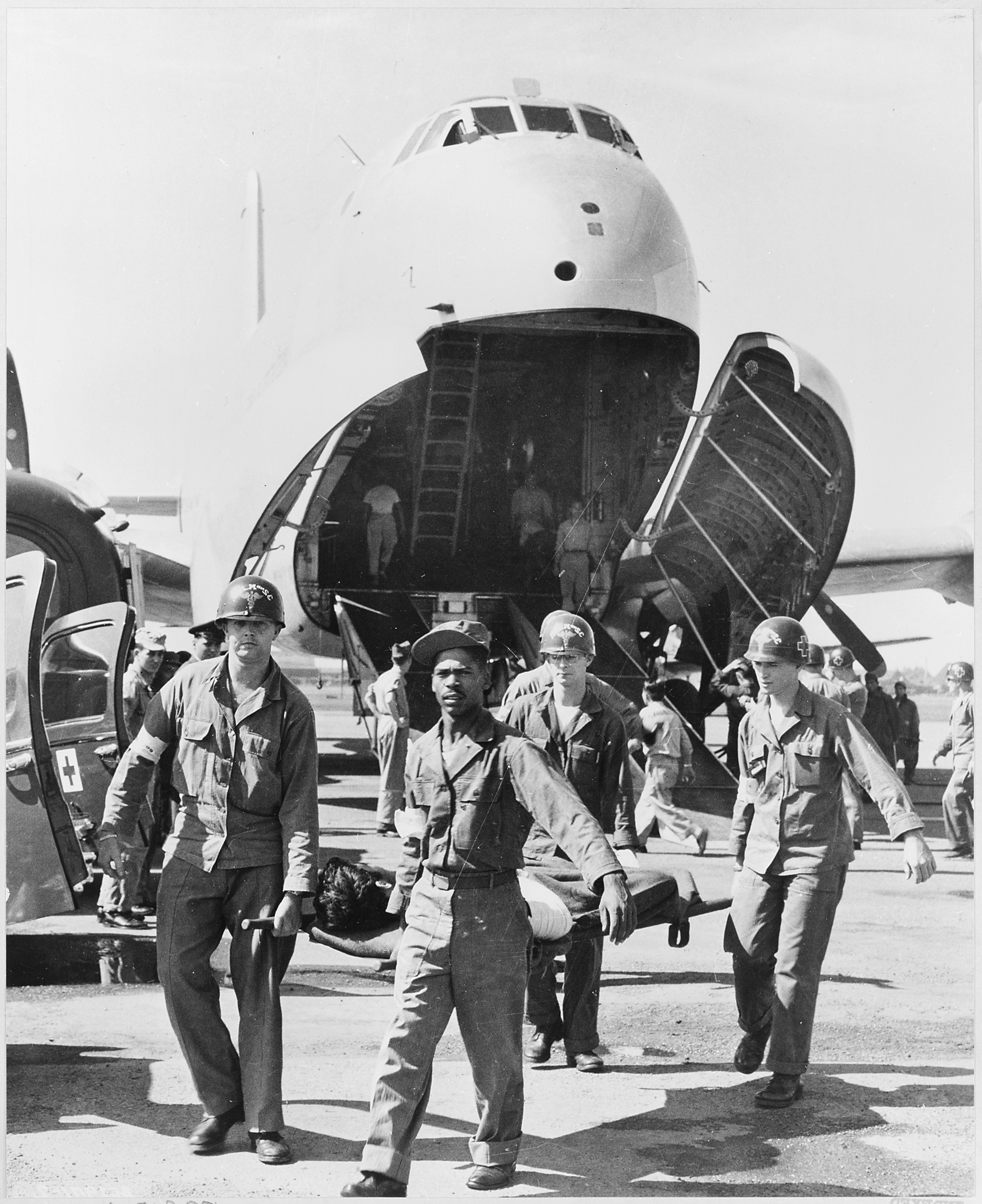
Wounded arrived to Tokyo base by C-124 within Korean Airlift in 1952

The Korean Airlift was a military operation during the Korean War by the United States Air Force, the Royal Canadian Air Force, and other air forces participating in the United Nations action. Beginning in 1950 under the command of Major General William H. Tunner, it provided air support to the war in Korea.

The Airlift provided such things as:

- landing and dropping supplies
- troop transport
- paratroop operations
- psychological operations
- medivac and air rescues

== Participating Units ==
- USAF Combat Cargo Command (Provisional)
- RCAF
