= Isaac James (band) =

Hard rock musical group

- Also known as: IJ
- Origin: Des Moines, Iowa/Kansas City, Missouri, United States
- Genres: Hard rock, rock, rock and roll
- Years active: 2008–present
- Members: Blackie Starks; Mike Ruby; Rich Cantrell; Joel Ekman
- Past members: Gil Cole and John Lillard until 2013

Isaac James is an American rock band, with roots based in both Kansas City, Missouri and Des Moines, Iowa, United States.

== History ==
Isaac James was formed in the summer of 2008 by members Blackie Starks, Gil Cole, Joel Ekman (formerly of Grammy-nominated Stone Sour), and John Lillard. Joel Ekman had originally parted ways with Stone Sour in 2006 to take care of his son, Isaac James Ekman who had been diagnosed with cancer. Isaac soon died, and Joel suggested using Isaac James as the band's name in memory of their son. The band agreed, and in January 2009 the band officially took on the name Isaac James.

=== Too Much Horsepower (2008–2009) ===
After writing heavily in the fall of 2008, Blackie had contacted major label producer and long time friend, Scott Spelbring (The Speaks, Plunge (band), SR-71 (band), Field of Grey to produce their debut record, Too Much Horsepower. The 5 song EP was recorded in both Scott's studio in Virginia and in Kansas City studio, Cypher Sound with major label producer Aaron Connor (Black Diamond) engineering. Before the EP's release, the buzz about the new band featuring an ex Stone Sour member, started circling the globe and soon after the band would be doing local and international radio and print interviews and secure distribution in major media outlets including media moguls Best Buy and iTunes

With the help of Protocol Entertainment, Too Much Horsepower yielded three singles in regular FM and Satellite radio rotation. Home, Hey, and Satisfied.

=== Shut Up And Listen (2011) ===
The band's first full-length record titled 'Shut Up And Listen' was written by Isaac James and produced by Larry Gann. The album released in April 2011, pushed three singles to Fm and Satellite radio carrying on its momentum previously gained from Too Much Horsepower. The Rain, The Real Me, and Save My Tomorrow are currently still in rotation on several stations both in the United States and abroad. The whole album is available for download on the Isaac James website.

=== Return ===
After a hiatus that lasted over a year, the band returned to the stage on 3 October 2015 at Wooly's in Des Moines, Iowa. The reincarnation of Isaac James came with two new well-known and respected Iowa musicians, Rich Cantrell and Mike Ruby and now call Des Moines, Iowa home. The band is also currently writing new material.

=== Endorsements ===
The band was recently picked up by Jesse James American Outlaw Bourbon as an American Outlaw band and has been performing under the American Outlaw Bourbon umbrella across the country

== Band members ==
Current

- Blackie Starks - lead vocals, occasional guitar (2008–present)
- Mike Ruby - guitar, backing vocals (2015–present)
- Rich Cantrell - bass guitar (2015–present)
- Joel Ekman - drums, percussion (2008–present)

Former

- Brian Wayne Strawn - drums, percussion (2013)
- Gil Cole - guitar, backing vocals (2008–2013)
- John Lillard - bass guitar (2008–2015)
