= Dwight James =

Barbadian footballer

Personal information
- Place of birth: Barbados
- Position: Defender

Team information
- Current team: Notre Dame

Senior career*
Years	Team	Apps	(Gls)
2002–2003	Youth Milan		
2004–	Notre Dame		

International career
2004–2007	Barbados	5	(0)
- * Club domestic league appearances and goals as of 14 May 2011

Dwight James is a Barbadian international footballer who plays for Notre Dame, as a defender.

== Career ==
James played for the Barbadian national team between 2004 and 2007.
