= Kim James =

American politician

Member-elect of the Utah House of Representatives from the 8th district
- Assuming office January 1, 2027
- Succeeding: Jason Kyle

Personal details
- Party: Democratic
- Website: Campaign website

Kim James is an American politician. A member of the Democratic Party, she is the member-elect for the 8th district of the Utah House of Representatives. She was elected at the 2026 election. She is a retired minister of the United Methodist Church.
