= David James (cricketer, born 1921) =

Welsh cricketer

David James (March 3, 1921 — February 22, 2002) was a Welsh cricketer. He was a right-handed batsman and a right-arm medium-fast bowler who played first-class cricket for Glamorgan. He was born in Briton Ferry and died in Margam.

James made a single first-class appearance for Glamorgan, in their championship-winning season of 1948, against Nottinghamshire, having played league cricket for Briton Ferry Town and Briton Ferry Steel.

David's father, Edward James, played three first-class matches for Glamorgan in 1922.
