= Maude Wordsworth James =

Australian artist (1855–1936)

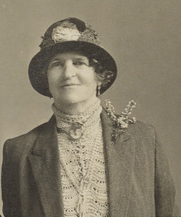
- Born: 19 December 1855; At sea, aboard the Morning Star, Indian Ocean
- Died: 1 October 1936 (aged 80); Adelaide, Australia
- Known for: Promoted "coo-ee" as patriotic symbol
- Notable work: My coo-ee (1908); The coo-ee songs of Australia (1913); The Coo-ee Call (1917)

Maude Wordsworth James (19 December 1855 – October 1936, Adelaide), born Maude Crabbe, was an Australian designer, author and songwriter. She was an executive officer of the Kalgoorlie Ladies' Referendum Committee. She is best known for promoting "cooee" as an Australian patriotic symbol, designing cooee jewelry and writing cooee songs. George Crabbe, a famous English poet, is Maude's ancestor.

== Life ==
Maude Crabbe was born on 19 December 1855 at sea aboard the ship Morning Star in the Indian Ocean approximately 2,500 kilometers south west of Western Australia. Her parents, Thomas and Alicia Crabbe, were unassisted immigrants sailing from Bristol to Melbourne. Maude was their fourth child, and between 1856 and 1871 her mother bore another 6 children.

In the childhood Crabbe lived in Victoria moving from Williamstown near Melbourne, to Portland, Dunnolly, and finally Maryborough, where she met her husband Charles Wordsworth Scantlebury James. They married at the All Saints Church in Bendigo, Victoria, on 3 November 1875. James gave birth to their first son, Cyril Haughton, in Bendigo in 1878. In 1880 she bore a daughter who died only sixteen days old. Between 1878 and 1883 the family moved to Hobart where their third child, Tristram in 1883, and fourth, Yolande in 1889, were born.

In 1896 James’ husband Charles obtained work of a civil engineer in Kalgoorlie and approximately a year after he asked his wife and children join him. James and the children arrived in Kalgoorlie in March 1897, settling in Mullingar, a locality of Kalgoorlie. The family became more secure when her husband was employed as a town surveyor by the Kalgoorlie Municipal Council.

Having moved to Kalgoorlie James started a journal which she kept until 1907, recording her impressions of life in Kalgoorlie, including copies of letters, invitations to social events, photographs, sketches and newspaper articles. Soon after arriving to Kalgoorlie James wrote in her journal that this was the most depressing place she had ever been to. Despite unfavorable landscape views around Kalgoorlie, after a few years James managed to develop feelings of belonging for her home there. James’ journal also became an important source providing first-hand evidence of the way in which late nineteenth-century goldfields residents created and maintained their gardens. In 1908 James left Kalgoorlie and went to South Australia.

From 1924 to 1926 James lived in England and then returned to Australia settling in Mosman, Sydney until 1931 when she came back to Adelaide. Maude Wordsworth James died in North Adelaide in October 1936.

== Work ==
Although her husband had a secured job, James wanted to find means of earning some extra income for her family. She started designing Australian souvenir jewellery, which she patented as "cooee" jewellery. She made brooches, bangles, cuff links, pins and spoons from Australian gold, with tourmaline from Kangaroo Island, opals from Queensland, and pearls from Broome, incorporating Australian fauna, flora and indigenous motifs. In December 1907 her designs were exhibited in Perth. James registered her designs in England, New Zealand and Australia. As she registered cooee as a trademark, James asked the Heidelberg district volunteers’ farewell social committee for royalties when they made cooee medallions in 1916, however lawyers explained her that she owned only her cooee designs, not the cooee itself that belongs to all Australians.

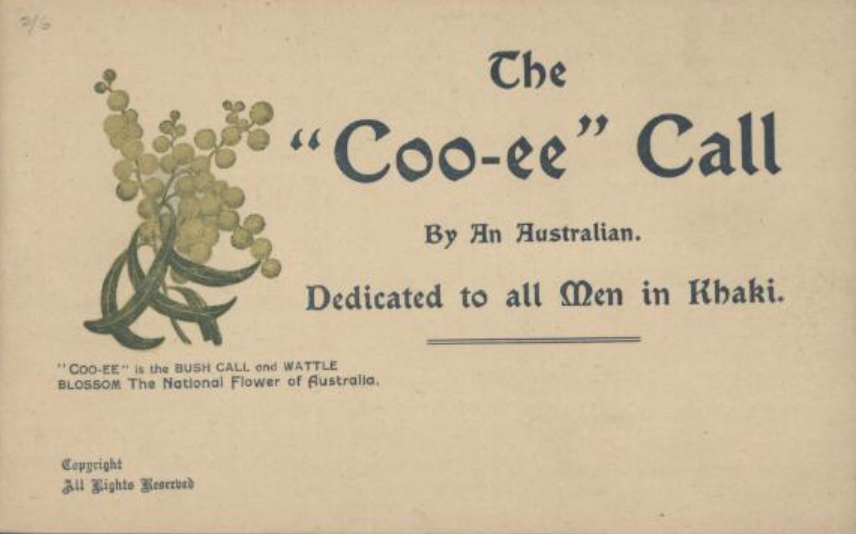
cover of The "Coo-ee" Call, 1917

Besides designing cooee jewellery James wrote cooee songs. In 1908 her musical score My coo-ee was published in Melbourne. The coo-ee songs of Australia, a pamphlet listing the names of 17 songs with some lyrics for the songs Love surrender and My blue rose, was published in Adelaide in 1913. In 1917 the cooee songs were published in a form of a book called The coo-ee call.

James also collected a 'thousand signatures' by many outstanding people she met, including royalty and gold miners, some of the signatures were embroidered in an autograph 'Cloth of Memory'. She gave many concerts performing her own songs written during World War I, including her famous composition 'Cooee' dedicated to Australian soldiers.

A Rydal Street in Kalgoorlie was named after her home's name – "Rydal Camp".
