= Laura James (nurse) =

New Zealand nurse

Laura Elizabeth James ARRC MM (12 December 1880 – 23 February 1969) was a New Zealand nurse. She served in the Queen Alexandra Imperial Military Nursing Service during World War I and was one of the most decorated nurses of World War I.

== Early life ==
James was born in Hokitika, on the West Coast of New Zealand's South Island, to David James and Jane Clayton. Her father was a medical doctor from England. Her parents divorced in 1883 and her father returned to England in 1884. James was educated at Mrs Croasdaile Bowen's Private School in Christchurch and at Wellington Girls' College.

== Career ==
From 1906 to 1909, James trained as a nurse at Wellington Hospital under Francis Payne, completing her national nursing examination in 1909. In January 1910 she left New Zealand for Europe, accompanying a pregnant woman to Genoa, Italy. At the end of that year she applied to join the Queen Alexandra Imperial Military Nursing Service and was accepted as a Staff Nurse. She served in London and Wiltshire, and when World War I broke out she was sent to France. James was initially stationed at Rouen, and later took charge of a field ambulance station at Arras. In June 1917 she was promoted to the rank of Sister and moved to work in a stationary hospital, then a casualty clearing station and an ambulance train. In 1918 she was appointed Acting Matron of a general hospital in Genoa, Italy.

During World War I, James received six medals and was mentioned in dispatches twice. The awards were the Royal Red Cross, the Military Medal, the 1914 Star, the General Service War Medal, the Victory Medal, and the Allies' Medal. She also received five overseas service chevrons.

In 1919, James returned to England from Italy and requested permission to travel to New Zealand to settle her father's estate; he had died in 1916. Her request was declined and instead she requested a transfer to London so she could consult with a visiting lawyer regarding her father's matters. In 1924 she was posted to Gibraltar and then Malta. She returned to England from 1926 to 1931, and was then posted to India, where she was appointed Matron of a hospital in Poona. She worked there until 1933, when she returned to England. She retired from the QAIMNS in 1937 and died in a nursing home in Sussex in 1969.
