= Stephan James =

Stephan James may refer to either:

- Stephan James (actor) (born 1993), Canadian actor
- Stephan James (athlete) (born 1993), Guyanese athlete
