= Marvin James =

Swiss snowboarder

Personal information
- Born: 27 October 1989 (age 36) Reichenbach im Kandertal, Switzerland

Sport
- Sport: Skiing

Marvin James (born 27 October 1989 in Reichenbach im Kandertal) is a Swiss snowboarder, specializing in snowboard cross.

James competed at the 2014 Winter Olympics for Switzerland. In the snowboard cross, he finished 3rd in his 1/8 round race, advancing to the quarter-finals, where he did not finish and failed to advance, ending up 21st overall.

As of September 2014, his best showing at the World Championships is 23rd, in the 2011 snowboard cross.

James made his World Cup debut in February 2008. As of September 2014, his best finish is 11th, at Montafon in 2013–14. His best overall finish is 35th, in 2013–14.
