= Ted James =

Ted James may refer to:

- Ted James (cricketer) (1924–2013), English cricketer
- Ted James (Montana politician) (1918–1995), lieutenant governor of Montana from 1965 to 1969
- Ted James (Louisiana politician), U.S. Small Business Administration official and Louisiana state representative
- Ted James (footballer) (1889–1968), Australian rules footballer
- Ted James (American football) (1906–1999), American football player and coach

== See also ==
- Edward James (disambiguation)
