= Luke James =

Luke James may refer to:

- Luke James (footballer) (born 1994), striker for Morpeth Town
- Luke James (rugby union) (born 1999), English rugby player
- Luke James (singer) (born 1984), American R&B singer
