= Carol James =

New Zealand footballer

Personal information
- Full name: Carol James

International career
| Years | Team | Apps | (Gls) |
| 1991 | New Zealand | 2 | (0) |

Carol James is a former association football player who represented New Zealand at international level.

James made her Football Ferns début in an 11–0 win over Papua New Guinea on 21 May 1991, and made just one further appearance, in a 0–1 loss to Australia on 23 May that same year.
