= Kevin James (cricketer) =

Dominican cricketer (born 1987)

Personal information
- Full name: Kevin Arthur James
- Born: 9 December 1987 (age 38); Saint George Parish, Dominica
- Batting: Left-handed
- Bowling: Right-arm medium-fast
- Role: All-rounder

Domestic team information
- Years: Team
- 2009–2011: Windward Islands
- Source: CricketArchive, 23 January 2016

Kevin Arthur James (born 9 December 1987) is a Dominican cricketer who has played for the Windward Islands in West Indian domestic cricket. He is an all-rounder who bowls right-arm medium pace and bats left-handed.

James appeared for Dominica at the 2008 Stanford 20/20, playing against the British Virgin Islands and Barbados. He made his senior debut for the Windwards in the 2008–09 WICB Cup, a limited-overs competition, and his first-class debut during the 2008–09 Regional Four Day Competition, Against Jamaica in the latter, James scored his only first-class half-century to date, 55 runs from fourth in the batting order. His most recent matches for the Windwards came in the 2010–11 Regional Four Day Competition.
