= Oliver James (footballer) =

English footballer (born 1987)

Personal information
- Full name: Oliver James
- Date of birth: 30 January 1987 (age 39)
- Place of birth: Birkenhead, England
- Positions: Defender; midfielder

Youth career
- Tranmere Rovers

Senior career*
Years	Team	Apps	(Gls)
2004–07	Tranmere Rovers	1	(0)
2007–2008	Forest Green Rovers	6	(0)
2008	Southport	8	(1)
2008–2009	Cammell Laird	?	(?)
2009–2013	Witton Albion	101	(2)
2013	Hinckley United	?	(?)
- * Club domestic league appearances and goals as of 27 March 2008

Oliver James (born 1 January 1987) is an English professional footballer who plays as a central midfielder also as can play in Centre-Back and retired .

== Career ==
James attended Wirral Grammar School for Boys, and was a product of the youth system at Tranmere Rovers. He was part of the Tranmere youth team squad that reached the quarter finals of the F.A. Youth Cup in 2004. He holds the record for the shortest ever professional Tranmere Rovers F. C. career having played for just 10 minutes on 6 May 2006. Brian Little gave him his one and only appearance when he replaced Paul Linwood in the 80th minute of the final League One game of the 2005–2006 season against Doncaster Rovers.

In July 2007, James left Tranmere and signed for Conference National side Forest Green Rovers under the guidance of manager Jim Harvey.

James spell at Forest Green was a short one however and he signed for Southport where he scored once in 8 appearances. Eventually moving on to Cammell Laird.

In late November 2008, James moved again for his first spell at Witton Albion. James went on to make 29 appearances for Witton in his first spell before leaving at the end of the 2009–10 season to spend time playing local amateur football.

In August 2011, James returned to Witton Albion for his second spell at the club.

James is now currently undertaking a Sports Development and Physical Education Degree at Liverpool John Moores University.

In August 2013, James was confirmed as a registered player for Hinckley United, playing in either central defense or midfield.

Post football, Oliver is now a top performer in a sales role while his image resembles x-factor star Shane Ward.
