= Martin S. James =

American art historian

Martin Samuel James
- Born: July 7, 1920; London, England
- Died: October 11, 2011 (aged 91); Ann Arbor, Michigan, USA
- Occupations: Historian, Professor, Translator
- Known for: Art History

Martin Samuel James (7 July 1920 – 11 October 2011) was an English-American art historian known primarily for his translations, with Harry Holtzman, of the writings of Piet Mondrian into English.

James was born in London, but was raised in Paris, where he attended Lycée Janson-de-Sailly. He later attended Columbia University for both his undergraduate and graduate degrees, where he studied under Meyer Schapiro. He received his B.A. from Columbia College in 1943, M.A. in 1962, and Ph.M. in 1973 from Columbia Graduate School of Arts and Sciences. He taught at Brooklyn College in Brooklyn, NY from 1949 to 1985, where he created one of the first collegiate programs on urbanism.

Professor James also took a keen interest in urban planning and urban design, both inside and outside the classroom, and was active in historical preservation movements in the Brooklyn Heights neighborhood in which he lived. He died in Ann Arbor, Michigan, USA, aged 91.

== Published books ==
- The new art — The new life: The collected writings of Piet Mondrian. With Harry Holtzman. Boston: G.K. Hall & Co, 1986 and reprints.
