= Frederick James (artist) =

American painter

- Born: c. 1845; Philadelphia, Pennsylvania
- Died: July 17, 1907; Percé, Quebec
- Known for: painter

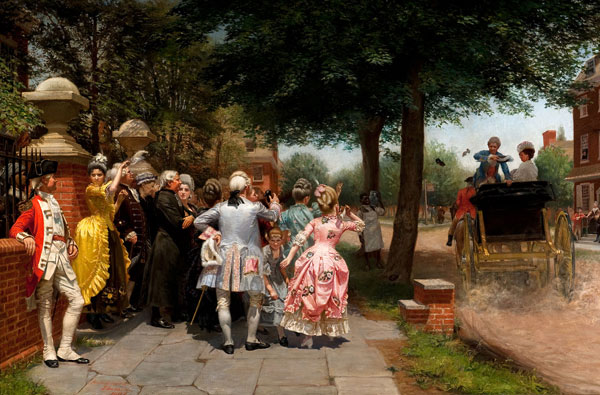
"A Colonial Wedding," 1883.

Frederick E. James (c. 1845 – 17 July 1907) was an American artist. He was noted for his depictions of 18th-century American life.

James was born in Philadelphia, Pennsylvania. He trained first at the Pennsylvania Academy of the Fine Arts and later under the famed French artist Jean-Léon Gérôme. He died in Percé, Quebec, Canada.

Portraits by him of Benjamin Franklin, Stephen Girard, and the Marquis de Lafayette hang in the Masonic Temple in Philadelphia.

== Works ==
- "A Colonial Wedding", 1883.
- "Canadian Kitchen"
- "Mischianza", 1881.
- "The Introduction"
- "The Card Player"
