= Deborah James (anthropologist) =

South African anthropologist and academic

Deborah James FBA
- Born: 1954 (age 71–72); South Africa
- Known for: Research on land reform, debt, redistribution, and state–citizen relations in South Africa and the United Kingdom
- Awards: Eliot P. Skinner Prize (2008) Fage and Oliver Prize (2016); Fellow of the Academy of Social Sciences (2018) Fellow of the British Academy (2019)

Academic background
- Education: University of the Witwatersrand

Academic work
- Discipline: Anthropology
- Sub-discipline: Economic anthropology Political anthropology Ethnography
- Institutions: London School of Economics (2008–present) South African Institute of Race Relations; University of the Witwatersrand University of KwaZulu-Natal
- Notable works: Songs of the Women Migrants (1999) Gaining Ground?: Rights and Property in South African Land Reform (2007); Money from Nothing (2014) Clawing Back: Redistribution in Precarious Times (2025)

Deborah James, FBA (born 1954) is a South African anthropologist and academic, who specialises in South Africa, economic anthropology, political anthropology, and ethnography.

Since 2008, she has been Professor of Anthropology at the London School of Economics in England.

== Career ==
She was previously an academic at the South African Institute of Race Relations, the University of the Witwatersrand, and the University of KwaZulu-Natal, all in South Africa. She was born in South Africa, grew up under apartheid, and was educated at the University of the Witwatersrand.

== Research ==
James's research has focused on the anthropology of South Africa and the United Kingdom. Her studies of economic anthropology have resulted in publications relating to debt and land reform in South Africa, and the effects of austerity on the United Kingdom. She is also interested in the relationships between people and the state.

== Awards and recognition ==
In 2008, James was awarded the Eliot P Skinner Prize by the Association for Africanist Anthropology for her book Gaining Ground?: "Rights" and "Property" in South African Land Reform (2007). In 2016, she was awarded the inaugural Fage and Oliver Prize by the African Studies Association of the United Kingdom for her book Money from Nothing: indebtedness and aspiration in South Africa (2015). In 2018, she was elected a Fellow of the Academy of Social Sciences. In 2019, she was elected a Fellow of the British Academy (FBA), the United Kingdom's national academy for the humanities and social sciences.

== Books ==
- James, Deborah (1999). Songs of the women migrants: performance and identity in South Africa. Edinburgh: Edinburgh University Press. ISBN 9780748613045.
- James, Deborah (2007). Gaining Ground?: Rights and Property in South African Land Reform. London: Routledge. ISBN 9781135308513.
- James, Deborah (2014). Money from nothing: indebtedness and aspiration in South Africa. Stanford, California: Stanford University Press. ISBN 9780804793155.
- James, Deborah (2025). Clawing Back: Redistribution in Precarious Times. Stanford, California: Stanford University Press. ISBN 9781503642874.
