= Eric James (cricketer, 1881–1948) =

Australian cricketer

Personal information
- Full name: Eric Lisle James
- Born: 21 October 1881; Low Head, Tasmania
- Died: 28 August 1948 (aged 66); Malvern, Victoria, Australia
- Role: All-rounder

Domestic team information
- Years: Team
- 1904: Tasmania

Career statistics
Competition	FC
Matches	1
Runs scored	4
Batting average	4.00
100s/50s	0/0
Top score	4
Balls bowled	42
Wickets	0
Bowling average	n/a
5 wickets in innings	0
10 wickets in match	0
Best bowling	0/36
Catches/stumpings	0/-
- Source: CricketArchive, 1 January 2013

Eric Lisle James (21 October 1881 – 28 August 1948) was an Australian cricketer who played a single first-class match for Tasmania. Born in Low Head, Tasmania, James's only recorded matches came during the 1903–04 season. In December 1903, he played for "North" in the first of two "North v South" matches for the season, held at the NTCA Ground in Launceston. He also played in the return fixture, held in April 1904 at the TCA Ground in Hobart. James's only match at state level came against the touring Marylebone Cricket Club in January 1904, as part of the English team's 1903–04 tour of Australia. In the match, played in Launceston, he scored four runs in his only innings before being bowled by George Hirst, and failed to take a wicket whilst bowling. James died in Malvern, Victoria (a suburb of Melbourne), in August 1948.

== See also ==
- List of Tasmanian representative cricketers
