= Eric James (cricketer, 1923–1999) =

Australian cricketer

Personal information
- Full name: Eric Pearse James
- Born: 27 February 1923; Albany, Western Australia
- Died: 28 March 1999 (aged 76); Albany, Western Australia
- Batting: Right-handed
- Bowling: Right-arm leg-break
- Role: Batsman

Domestic team information
- Years: Team
- 1953/54–1954/55: Western Australia

Career statistics
Competition	First-class
Matches	3
Runs scored	25
Batting average	8.33
100s/50s	0/0
Top score	24
Balls bowled	682
Wickets	7
Bowling average	56.28
5 wickets in innings	0
10 wickets in match	0
Best bowling	2/81
Catches/stumpings	0/–
- Source: CricketArchive, 1 January 2013

Eric Pearse James (27 February 1923 – 28 March 1999) was an Australian cricketer who played several matches for Western Australia from 1953–54 to 1954–55. Born in Albany, James played his early cricket for Cranbrook, a small town in the Great Southern region of Western Australia. After strong performances for a combined Tambellup–Cranbrook team in the annual Country Week carnival, held in Perth, he was recruited to play grade cricket for East Perth for the 1948–49 season. A right-arm leg-spinner, James switched to Nedlands the following season, but difficulty in travelling between Cranbrook and Perth led him to quit the club. From then on, his only exposure to the state selectors was at the Country Week carnivals, where he helped Tambellup–Cranbrook to three consecutive "A" section premierships from the 1950–51 season onwards. James was finally selected to make his state debut against the touring New Zealanders in March 1954. He played a further two matches for state teams, but was unable to gain regular selection. James remained involved in country cricket for a long time after his last match for Western Australia, dying in Albany in March 1999, aged 76.

== Career ==
Born in Albany, Western Australia, James was raised on his parents' farm in nearby Cranbrook, and played his early matches for the town's cricket team against other local towns. In 1938, aged 15, he played a key part in Cranbrook's win over Kendenup in the local competition's grand final. James enlisted in the Australian Army in July 1942, and saw service in the Pacific Theatre as a corporal in the 16th Battalion. He was discharged in October 1945, and returned to Cranbrook. James resumed playing cricket almost immediately, and in one match, against Denmark in January 1946, took figures of 8/19 bowling right-arm leg spin. One of the region's top bowlers, the following season he took a hat-trick against Tambellup, finishing with 5/16. This continued good form led to his selection to represent a combined Tambellup–Cranbrook side at the annual "Country Week" tournament held in Perth, with James recording five-wicket hauls against Geraldton and Merredin. James again played for Tambellup–Cranbrook in the 1947–48 Country Week carnival, leading the "A" section's bowling aggregates with 23 wickets at an average of 8.9. His performance in the carnival, which included a hat-trick in the final round, attracted the interest of several clubs in the Perth-based WACA district competition, and he eventually signed with East Perth for the 1948–49 season.

Instead of moving to Perth, James chose to remain on his family's farm, choosing to travel the distance of 560 miles (900 km) to Perth to play in matches. Having taken 64 wickets at an average of 12.04 for East Perth, he switched to Nedlands for the 1949–50 season. His travel pattern continued, with James catching either the train or the bus to Perth each weekend. On one occasion, he left Perth on Friday night, played a full day of cricket with East Perth, returned to Cranbrook on the Saturday night train, and played another match for Tambellup–Cranbrook on the Sunday. Having already taken 49 wickets for the season, James returned to Cranbrook towards the end of the season to assist with farmwork. He was unsure whether to continue playing in Perth for the following season, at one stage deciding to remain with Nedlands, but later changing his mind and returning to Cranbrook. This, however, enabled James to again play in the Country Week carnival, although an arm injury restricted his bowling during the tournament. Although remaining based in Cranbrook, he was included in the practice squad for the state team the following season, and subsequently played for Western Australia Colts in a match against the touring Marylebone Cricket Club. In that season's Country Week, he took figures of 6/80 in the final, helping Tambellup–Cranbrook to win the "A" section, and once again led the tournament's bowling aggregates.

James partnered with fellow leg-spinner Morgan Herbert for the 1952–53 carnival, in one match combining for 17 wickets. Tambellup–Cranbrook again won the "A" section on the back of his seven wickets in the final, despite Barry Shepherd's score of 155 for Donnybrook. After another strong performance in the following year's carnival, in which he took 29 wickets at an average of 12.4, James began to be seriously considered for state selection, despite being based outside of Perth. He was finally selected to play for Western Australia against the touring New Zealanders in March 1954, replacing Alan Preen in the side. Making his debut at the age of 28, James took two wickets in each innings of the match, with Western Australia losing by 184 runs. This included a wicket in his second over of first-class cricket, although Bert Sutcliffe later scored heavily off him in his innings of 142 runs. James was not selected at Sheffield Shield level during the season, with his next match at state level coming in the 1954–55 season for a Combined XI against the touring English team. Taking figures of 2/92 in England's only innings, James was selected for a Sheffield Shield match against South Australia the following month, in November 1954. Playing alongside Herbert, his longtime Tambellup–Cranbrook teammate, he took a single wicket in the match, which was to be his last at state level. James finished his first-class career with seven wickets from three matches, at an average of 56.28. Western Australia's spin bowlers for the next decade included players like Tom O'Dwyer, Lewis Germaine, and John Stubbs. James remained involved in country cricket well into the 1960s. He was playing for Western Australia County as late as the 1960–61 season, in a match against the touring West Indians in Bunbury. James died in Albany in March 1999, aged 76.
