= Evan James (writer) =

American fiction writer

- Education: University of Iowa
- Writing career
- Genres: Essays, fiction
- Website: www.evanjameswriter.com

Evan James is an American writer. He is the author of Cheer Up, Mr. Widdicombe, a novel, and I’ve Been Wrong Before, an essay collection.

== Career ==
James is a graduate of the Iowa Writers' Workshop. He is editor-at-large of The Iowa Review.

His debut novel Cheer Up, Mr. Widdicombe was released by Washington Square Press in 2019. The novel follows seven members of one family. In a review, The Washington Post named him "a writer to watch." Kirkus Reviews called it "a gleefully over-the-top satiric debut."

The New York Times wrote: "James’s debut novel — a comedy of manners about the banes of upper-middle-class characters — bubbles with self-realizations, love in the patois of addiction speak, incipient love that could bridge oceans and a self-help expo keynote address imploring the freeing of our inherent wildness."

James published his essay collection I’ve Been Wrong Before: Essays with Atria Books in 2020. It explores his experiences as a traveling gay man seeking adventure, relationships, and a career.

Library Journal called it "heart-wrenching, hilarious, and provocative, a profoundly moving book that doesn’t let up and is well worth the emotion." Booklist wrote that James "makes notes aplenty, even about the most quotidian moments (throwing his back out) but hardly at breakneck speed. Perhaps he has been wrong before, but in this fine collection he is inarguably right." Publishers Weekly described it as "promising", suggesting: "most readers should find James’s account of his journey into adulthood a smooth and enjoyable ride."

One of the essays, "A Role I Was Born to Play", published in The New York Times, was read by Queer Eye star Tan France for the Modern Love podcast.

== Bibliography ==
- Cheer Up, Mr. Widdicombe: A Novel (Washington Square Press, 2019)
- I’ve Been Wrong Before: Essays (Atria Books, 2020)
