= Isaac James (Medal of Honor) =

Medal of Honor recipient (1838–1914)

- Born: March 8, 1838; Jefferson Township, Ashtabula County, OH
- Died: September 26, 1914 (aged 76); Union City, Darke Co OH
- Burial place: Union City, Indiana
- Military career
- Allegiance: United States of America
- Branch: United States Army; Union Army
- Rank: Private
- Units: Company H, 110th Ohio Infantry
- Conflicts: American Civil War
- Awards: Medal of Honor

Isaac James (March 8, 1838 – September 26, 1914) was an American soldier who fought in the American Civil War. James received his country's highest award for bravery during combat, the Medal of Honor. James's medal was won for capturing the flag at Petersburg, Virginia on April 2, 1865. He was honored with the award on May 10, 1865.

James was from Jefferson Township in Ohio.

== Medal of Honor citation ==
The President of the United States of America, in the name of Congress, takes pleasure in presenting the Medal of Honor to Private Isaac James, United States Army, for extraordinary heroism on 2 April 1865, while serving with Company H, 110th Ohio Infantry, in action at Petersburg, Virginia, for capture of flag.

== See also ==
- List of American Civil War Medal of Honor recipients: G–L
