= Nicholas James (MP) =

Nicholas James (died 1433), of London, was an English Member of Parliament (MP).

He was a Member of the Parliament of England for City of London in March 1416, 1429 and 1431.
