= Evan James (cricketer) =

Welsh cricketer

Personal information
- Full name: Evan Llewellyn James
- Born: 10 May 1918; Barry, Glamorgan, Wales
- Died: January 1989 (aged 70); South Glamorgan, Glamorgan, Wales
- Batting: Right-handed
- Bowling: Right-arm medium

Domestic team information
- Years: Team
- 1946–1947: Glamorgan

Career statistics
| Competition | First-class |
|---|---|
| Matches | 9 |
| Runs scored | 232 |
| Batting average | 29.00 |
| 100s/50s | –/2 |
| Top score | 62* |
| Balls bowled | 84 |
| Wickets | 1 |
| Bowling average | 45.00 |
| 5 wickets in innings | – |
| 10 wickets in match | – |
| Best bowling | 1/8 |
| Catches/stumpings | 10/– |
- Source: Cricinfo, 26 December 2011

Evan Llewellyn James (10 May 1918 – January 1989) was a Welsh cricketer. James was a right-handed batsman who bowled right-arm medium pace. He was born at Barry, Glamorgan.

James made his first-class debut for Glamorgan against Warwickshire in the 1946 County Championship. He made eight further first-class appearances for the county, the last of which came against Derbyshire in the 1947 County Championship. In his nine first-class matches, he scored a total of 232 runs at an average of 29.00, with a high score of 62 not out. This score was one of two half centuries he made and came against the touring Indians in 1946, while his other half century score was a score of 59 not out and came against Derbyshire in 1946. With the ball, he took a single first-class wicket.

He died in South Glamorgan sometime in January 1989.
