= Oliver James (cricketer) =

Welsh cricketer

Personal information
- Full name: Oliver Richard James
- Born: 7 October 1990 (age 36); Neath, Glamorgan, Wales
- Nickname: OJ, Spuds
- Batting: Right-handed
- Bowling: Right-arm off break

Domestic team information
- Years: Team
- 2011: Loughborough MCCU
- 2010: Herefordshire
- 2008–2009: Wales Minor Counties

Career statistics
Competition	First-class
Matches	1
Runs scored	8
Batting average	8.00
100s/50s	–/–
Top score	8
Balls bowled	132
Wickets	1
Bowling average	102.00
5 wickets in innings	–
10 wickets in match	–
Best bowling	1/91
Catches/stumpings	1/–
- Source: Cricinfo, 15 August 2011

Oliver Richard James (born 7 October 1990) is a Welsh cricketer. James is a right-handed batsman who bowls right-arm off break. He was born in Neath, Glamorgan.

James made his debut for Wales Minor Counties in the 2008 MCCA Knockout Trophy against Dorset. He played Minor counties cricket for Wales Minor Counties in 2008 and 2009, making a total of six Minor Counties Championship appearances and three MCCA Knockout Trophy appearances. In 2010, he represented Herefordshire in a single MCCA Knockout Trophy match against Oxfordshire.

While studying for his degree in Business Economics and Finance at Loughborough University, James made his first-class debut for Loughborough MCCU against Leicestershire in 2011. In this match, which is his only first-class appearance to date, saw him dismiss James Taylor, only after Taylor had compiled his career best score of 237. With the bat, James scored 8 runs in Loughborough's first-innings, before being dismissed by Sam Cliff, while in their second-innings he wasn't required to bat.

It is rumoured that Oliver James won Mr Usk in 2010, however the result was contentious with a disputed swimwear round.

Oliver was awarded the London Market Forum 'Broking Professional of the Year' in 2018 but, after an inquiry into the votes and voting process, the award was subsequently rescinded.

Oliver James is also a keen ornithologist.

== Honours ==
Mr. Usk

- Runner-up: 2010

London Market Forum 'Broking Professional of the Year'

- Winner: 2018 (later rescinded)
