= Daniel James (British Army soldier) =

- Born: Esmail Mohammed Beigi Gamasai; 1962 (age 63–64); Tehran, Iran
- Military career
- Allegiance: United Kingdom
- Branch: British Army
- Service years: 1988–2006
- Rank: Corporal
- Unit: Princess of Wales' Royal Regiment
- Conflicts: Afghanistan Campaign

Daniel James (born Esmail Mohammed Beigi Gamasai, in 1962), is a former British Army corporal who was found guilty of a violation of the Official Secrets Act 1911 for attempting to pass information to Iran.

James was formerly the interpreter and sometimes driver for British Army Lieutenant-General Sir David Richards, who commanded the NATO forces in Afghanistan. James speaks fluent Pashtun and Persian. He attempted to pass information to Iran about British activities in Helmand Province.

== Life in Brighton ==
James used to run the Club New York (a salsa and hip-hop club) in Brighton opposite Churchill Square. He would teach salsa at this club.

== Arrest and Appearance ==
James' charges were read in the City of Westminster Magistrates' Court in London and was charged under Section 1 of the Official Secrets Act 1911. Action was taken very quickly, so that the then Attorney-General, Lord Goldsmith, had not approved the prosecution before James was told of the charge. The full charge read on court on 2 November 2006 was that he was charged for a "purpose prejudicial to the safety of the State and that he "communicated to be directly or indirectly useful to the enemy." He was tried before Senior District Judge Timothy Workman.

In November 2008 he was found guilty by a jury of spying for Iran on a charge of 'communicating information useful to an enemy', and sentenced to ten years imprisonment. The jury failed to agree verdicts on two other charges relating to his possession of sensitive documents on a USB memory stick, and of misconduct in a public office, and these charges were left on the table.
