= Benjamin James (American football) =

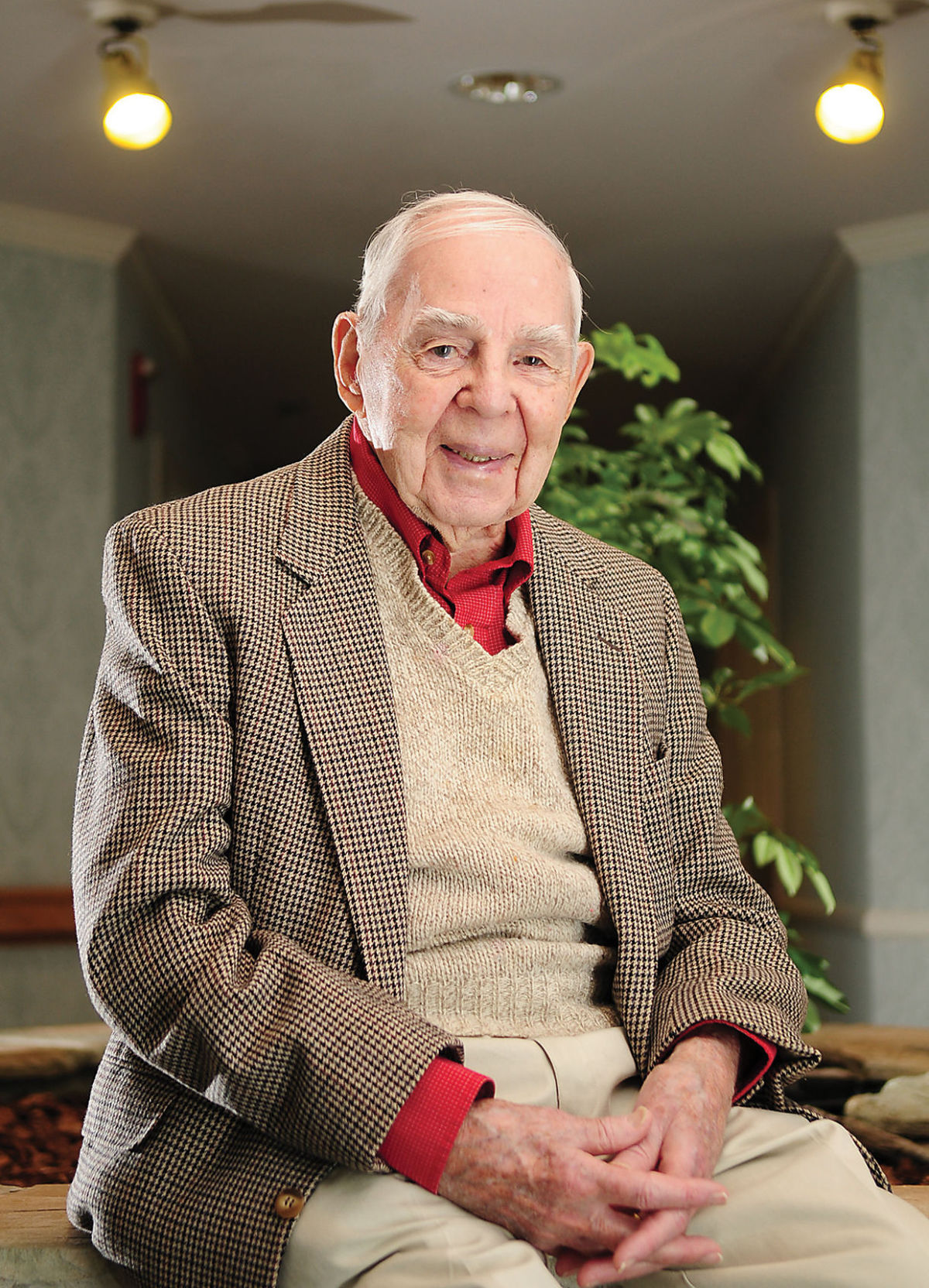

Biographical details
- Born: August 10, 1912; Plymouth, Pennsylvania, U.S.
- Died: July 4, 2015 (aged 102); Carlisle, Pennsylvania, U.S.

Playing career
- c. 1930: Dickinson
- Position: Center

Coaching career (HC unless noted)
- ?–1940: Plymouth HS (PA)
- 1941: Dickinson (assistant)
- 1942: Dickinson

Head coaching record
- Overall: 1–5 (college)

Benjamin D. James (August 10, 1912 – July 4, 2015) was an American athletics coach, educator, and college administrator. He served as the head football coach at Dickinson College in Carlisle, Pennsylvania, in 1942, compiling a record of 1–5.

== Biography ==
James was born on August 10, 1912, in Plymouth, Pennsylvania. He entered Dickinson College in 1930 on an academic scholarship and participated in football, basketball, baseball, and track. In football, he played as a center in the 1931 team that upset Penn State.

== See also ==
- Plymouth, Pennsylvania
