= Brian James (cricketer, born 1934) =

English cricketer

Brian James (23 April 1934 – 1999) was an English first-class cricketer, who played four matches for Yorkshire County Cricket Club in 1954. He also appeared for the Yorkshire Second XI between 1953 and 1959.

Born in Darfield, Barnsley, Yorkshire, England, James was a left arm fast medium bowler, who took eight wickets at 28.50, with a best return of 4 for 74 against Cambridge University. He scored 22 runs, and was dismissed twice in five innings. His top score was 11, also against Cambridge University.

He was a professional with Brighouse C.C. in 1958 and Bankfoot C.C. in 1960, and was believed to have been a professional in Staffordshire in the late 1960s. He took 303 wickets for Honley C.C. between 1952 and 1968.
