= Justin James (musician) =

- Born: Vancouver, British Columbia, Canada
- Genres: Pop, pop rock, folk rock
- Occupations: Singer-songwriter, musician
- Instruments: Vocals, guitar
- Years active: 2007–present
- Labels: Gold Sky Records, Universal
- Website: justinjamesmusic.com

Justin James is a Canadian singer-songwriter from Vancouver, British Columbia. He released his first studio album, Sun Drenched, in 2007 on Universal. The title track "California" was featured in MTV's Laguna Beach and The Hills. Other songs off the album gained recognition from placements on network shows What About Brian, Ghost Whisperer, Starter Wife, Las Vegas, and others. His song "Love Me More" was used in the highly successful Korean TV drama Iris. James released his second studio album, Perfect Sometimes, in 2010, with arrangements and production from Andrew Williams and a writing team of James, Ben Greet, and Al Howard behind most of the album's tracks. "A Beautiful Life", James' third studio album, was released in 2011 and earned him a spot on Lemonade Entertainment Magazine's "2012 Male Breakout Artists" list. James released his 4th full-length studio album, "Islands", on 13 August 2013.

== Early life ==
Born in Vancouver, James was accepted into the British Columbia Boys Choir at the age of 10, he recorded & toured internationally with the choir until the age of 15. In his late teens, James competed as a windsurfer. In 1996, he was attacked by a tiger shark in Venezuela. He received over 250 stitches and lost almost half the blood in his body.

== Music career ==
James moved to Los Angeles and enrolled in Music School. James graduated with a degree in recording engineering from Musicians Institute. James performed at The Roxy, The Viper Room and The Whisky. James released an independent CD, Between Now And Never, and toured the United States.

In 2006, James recorded Sundrenched with producer Tim Feehan at Backroom Studios in Los Angeles. The album was picked up by 10 Spot/Universal Records.

In 2009, James recorded a follow-up album, Perfect Sometimes, with producers Mikal Blue and Andrew Williams. The single features Hawaiian ukulele player Jake Shimabukuro. Also in 2009, James played dates in Japan opening for Jake Shimabukuro. Sony International picked up the album for release in Japan.

James has been nominated for Best Male Vocals in the Los Angeles Music Awards, Best Pop Album in the San Diego Music Awards.

In 2011 James teamed up with All Hands Volunteers to produce the One Beating Heart Video Project to raise funds for victims of disasters around the world.

== Discography ==
- The Love EP – 2001 – Gold Sky Records
- Between Now And Never – 2004 – Gold Sky Records
- Sundrenched – 2007 – Universal/Gold Sky Records
- Perfect Sometimes – 2009 – Gold Sky Records
- A Beautiful Life – 2011 – Gold Sky Records
- Islands – 2013 – Gold Sky Records
