= Nick James (gridiron football) =

American gridiron football player (born 1993)

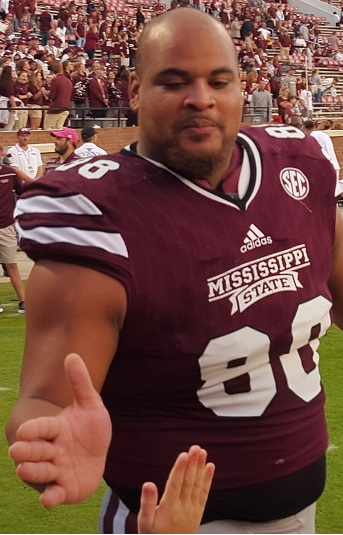
- James with Mississippi State in 2015

No. 97 – Gulf Coast Raiders
- Positions: Defensive tackle, defensive end
- Roster status: Active

Personal information
- Born: July 24, 1993 (age 33); Hattiesburg, Mississippi, U.S.
- Listed height: 6 ft 5 in (1.96 m)
- Listed weight: 328 lb (149 kg)

Career information
- High school: Long Beach
- College: Mississippi State
- NFL draft: 2017: undrafted

Career history
- Detroit Lions (2017)*; Saskatchewan Roughriders (2017); Birmingham Iron (2019); Albany Empire (2019)*; Dallas Renegades (2020)*; Houston Roughnecks (2020); Gulf Coast Raiders (2026–present)
- * Offseason or practice squad member only
- Stats at Pro Football Reference
- Stats at CFL.ca

Nicholas J. James (born July 24, 1993) is an American football defensive end for the Biloxi-based, semi-pro team, the Gulf Coast Raiders of the Next Level Football Alliance (NLFA). He previously played for the Saskatchewan Roughriders of the Canadian Football League (CFL), the Birmingham Iron of the Alliance of American Football (AAF), and the Houston Roughnecks of the XFL.

== College career ==
James played college football for Mississippi State on the defensive line. He played sparingly in 2012 and redshirted the 2013 season, before playing again in 2014, where he helped lead the Bulldogs to a #1 ranking and a bid to the Orange Bowl.

James started 15 games over his final two seasons (2015 and 2016). He had five tackles in a win over Troy in 2015, and registered a sack against South Carolina and Miami (Ohio) in 2016. James finished his career with 62 tackles, 6.5 tackles for loss, and two sacks.

== Professional career ==
James was not drafted in the 2017 NFL draft. He briefly signed with the Detroit Lions but was cut. He later signed with the Saskatchewan Roughriders on August 11 and made his debut on August 13 against the BC Lions.

In September 2018, James signed with Birmingham Iron of the Alliance of American Football. He was waived on March 26, 2019.

On May 8, 2019, James was assigned to the Albany Empire. On May 13, 2019, James was placed on reassignment, becoming a free agent. In October, he was picked by the Dallas Renegades in the 2020 XFL draft. He was traded to the Houston Roughnecks in exchange for tight end Julian Allen on January 13, 2020. He had his contract terminated when the league suspended operations on April 10, 2020.

He now plays semi-professional football for the Gulf Coast Raiders out of Biloxi, Mississippi who host their games at St. Patrick Catholic High School.
