= Donald James (surfer) =

American surfer

Doctor Donald Don James (died December 24, 1996) was a pioneer of early surfing in California prior to the WWII and surf photographer. His published works include many 1960s surf magazine covers. The early 1990s brought a resurgence of long board surfing and with it, a new 1992 VHS video titled Dr. "Don James presents: Surfing in the 1930s". It premiered pre World War II color footage of surfing to the surfing industry and a verbal history of the golden age of surfing / produced by Brad Jennings and Gene Walper / 1992/93, Other separate projects included The books: "Prewar Surfing" and "1936-1942 San Onofre to Point Dume".

James began surf photography while he was in high school, taking pictures of his pals, Ed Faron, the Quigg brothers, Bud Rice and the Beach Boys from the Bel Air Bay Club in Santa Monica. During the post Gidget era his talents appeared in commercials and on posters, Don James has been described as "The Premier Photographer of Surfing".

== Works ==
- Prewar Surfing Photographs, T. Adler Books; Second Printing edition (June 15, 2004), ISBN 978-1890481155
- Surfing San Onofre to Point Dume: 1936-1942
  - Chronicle Books; First Edition 1998, ISBN 978-0811821100
  - T. Adler Books, 2008, ISBN 9781933045818
