= Gordon C. James =

American public relations professional

- Occupations: Public Relations Professional, Speaker, Consultant
- Spouse: Lisa James
- Children: 7

Gordon C. James is a Phoenix, Arizona-based public relations professional, government affairs consultant and independent presidential advance contractor with links to the Republican Party and Bush family. He is the founder and president of Gordon C. James Public Relations which has offices in Phoenix, Arizona and Washington, D.C.

== Life and career ==
James grew up in Phoenix, Arizona and moved to Iowa in 1969 where he served several years in the Iowa National Guard. James worked in the real-estate management business in Des Moines, renting space to presidential candidates in town for the caucuses. In 1978, he met and rented space to former President of the United States George H. W. Bush (then Ambassador Bush).

After the 1988 election James worked as Lead Advance Representative at the White House for two years under President George H.W. Bush and Director of Invitations and Ticketing for the 51st Presidential Inaugural Committee. James was also employed as deputy director of events for the 54th and 55th Presidential Inauguration. In 1990 he founded the public relations firm Gordon C. James Public Relations.

In 2004, James was employed by former U.S. Deputy Chief of Staff Karl Rove to improve U.S. public relations in Iraq during the transition of governments. For more than five months he served as the Director of Advance and Special Events in the Office of Strategic Communications and Director of the Presidential Palace Studio for the Coalition Provisional Authority in Baghdad, Iraq. While there he advised Ambassador Paul Bremer and was responsible for coordinating the Ambassador's relations with Western and Pan-Arab media outlets and produced several events including the signing of the Tal (Iraq's Declaration of Independence) and 100 Days to Sovereignty, the countdown to the transfer of power from the CPA to newly founded Iraqi government.

In 2004 James assisted in several political stops with the Bush-Cheney campaign and in 2005, he was employed as lead advance representative for President George H.W. Bush and President Bill Clinton's tour of the Tsunami-hit regions of Indonesia.

James has traveled to five continents as a lead advance representative for President George W. Bush and First Lady Laura Bush. James' firm were active in several events for the John McCain for President campaign.

James is married, and has seven children. They live in Scottsdale.
