= Zig Media =

American mass media technology company

- Company type: Private
- Industry: Mass media
- Founded: 2016
- Headquarters: New York, NY
- Key people: Joshua James, Adam Platzner, John Tornow
- Products: Mobile apps and news media
- Website: www.zig.com

Zig Media is a mobile-media technology company based in Brooklyn, New York owned by Billboard-Hollywood Reporter. Called an "Instagram of news" by The New York Times, the company's platform distills original and sourced content into images and video, then distributes it through mobile phone and desktop computer applications. Fast Company reported that Zig had 400,000 users as of June 2018 following investment from Graydon Carter, Ronald Meyer, Quincy Jones, and LiveNation.

== History ==
In 2016, cofounders Joshua James and Adam Platzner approached Vanity Fair editor Graydon Carter to offer a modern, visual solution to changing magazine tastes and consumer news consumption. The New York Times reported that "at the time, Mr. Carter was mulling the state of news; he recalled an assistant pointing out to him that millennials ‘think in more visual terms, than in textual terms.’" With cofounder John Tornow, James and Platzner built an algorithm that captures personalized consumer data from social media preferences. The technology feeds news articles in the form of picture-heavy content back to each consumer according to their tastes.

Zig’s iOS application launched in January 2018. Reported by Billboard, first investors included Graydon Carter, Ron Meyer, and Quincy Jones. In May 2018 NBC News reported additional funding of $1.6 million from Alan Docter, Aviv Nevo, and LiveNation. In October 2018 The Hollywood Reporter wrote that Valence Media, part of Eldridge Industries, invested in Zig. In 2019, The Hollywood Reporter-Billboard acquired Zig Media.

== Technology ==
Users sign up for the Zig app or use Zig distribution channels to provide personalized media-consumption preferences to the platform’s algorithm. The platform returns media in a visual format based on the user’s personalized preferences and tailors each news feed over time based on additional consumer data. The technology tracks stories that users skip and click to optimize the news feed for each user.

In 2018, Fast Company compared Zig to Apple News and Flipboard with "more images and more personalization." CNBC explained that Zig "emphasizes photos over text" and reduces the time that consumers use to peruse the internet for news.
