= Benjamin James (Nova Scotia politician) =

Nova Scotian politician

Benjamin James (d. after 1799) was a farmer and political figure in Nova Scotia.

He represented Granville Township in the Nova Scotia House of Assembly from 1785 to 1793. He was born in Pennsylvania and served in a loyalist corps during the American Revolution. He came to Nova Scotia in 1783, settling in Annapolis County, where he was named a commissioner of the peace. James served as chairman of the Public Accounts committee in the provincial assembly. In 1799, he sold his farm to the Church of England to be used for the construction of a church and settled in Halifax. He was employed as an accountant at a dockyard there but died a few years later.
