= Hugh James (RAF officer) =

Royal Air Force officer

- Born: 3 October 1922; Cilfynydd, Wales
- Died: 7 January 2015 (aged 92); Cardiff, Wales
- Military career
- Allegiance: United Kingdom
- Branch: Royal Air Force
- Service years: 1940–1965
- Rank: Squadron Leader
- Nickname: "Jimmy"
- Units: No. 216 Squadron RAF; No. 24 Squadron RAF
- Conflicts: Second World War: North African Campaign; Mediterranean and Middle East theatre; Dodecanese Campaign; Berlin Airlift
- Awards: Air Force Cross & Bar; Distinguished Flying Medal

Hugh Glanffrwd "Jimmy" James (3 October 1922 – 7 January 2015) was a Welsh aviator and Royal Air Force (RAF) officer, who rose to the rank of squadron leader. He is best known for piloting the aircraft in which Lieutenant-General William Gott died.

== Career ==
In 1942 James (then 19) was a transport pilot for the Royal Air Force, serving in Egypt (he had lied about his age to join the Air Force).

On On 7 August 1942 he was piloting a slow Bristol Bombay of No. 216 Squadron RAF, on what was considered a safe route, behind British lines. On board was were 24 people, including General Gott, who had just been appointed head of the Eighth Army and was flying to meet Winston Churchill. James's transport was attacked by German fighters and badly damaged, forcing James to make a crash landing with no engines. He did so successfully, but two fighters returned and strafed the crashed plane, killing almost everyone on board including General Gott.

James, wounded and badly burned, set out for help and found some. He spent four months recuperating and underwent several operations. He was awarded the Distinguished Flying Medal for the incident.

The death of Gott resulted in Lieutenant-General Bernard Montgomery becoming head of the Eighth Army instead. General Gott had been considered by many in the high command as being not the wisest choice for the post that Churchill could have made; Lord Alanbrooke, Chief of the Imperial General Staff, wrote: "It seemed almost like the hand of God suddenly appearing to set matters right where we had gone wrong."

James returned to duty and flew missions in the Middle East for the rest of the war, including in the Dodecanese campaign, piloting the last plane to leave Kos. For this service he was awarded the Air Force Cross. After the war, he flew and trained pilots in the Berlin airlift, for which he received a bar (second Air Force Cross). He then transferred to the fighter service, flew jet fighters, and rose to the rank of squadron leader before retiring in 1965.

== Assassination theory ==
The destruction of James's plane may have been a planned assassination of General Gott. James himself believed so, noting that the presence of six German fighters that far behind British lines was unexpected, and staying to complete the destruction of a crashed aircraft odd. In 2005 James met with Emil Clade, who had led the fighters, and who said the ground strafing was not done under his orders but by another pair of fighters. Clade also said he had known that Gott was dead before the British did: he had been greeted on landing with congratulations for having killed General Gott. If true, the Germans may have deduced Gott's itinerary by intercepting a message from Bonner Fellers, sent in the Black Code which the Germans could read.

== Personal life ==
James married Beth Jones after the war; they had four children and later divorced. He then married Juliet Laughton who died in 2012, and they had two children (Laughton also had previously had a child, who became James's stepson). James died in Cardiff on 7 January 2015 at the age of 92.
