= Edward James (cricketer) =

Welsh cricketer

Personal information
- Full name: Edward Hugh James
- Born: 14 April 1896; Briton Ferry, Glamorgan, Wales
- Died: 15 March 1975 (aged 78); Briton Ferry, Glamorgan, Wales
- Batting: Left-handed
- Bowling: Slow left-arm orthodox
- Relatives: David James (son)

Domestic team information
- Years: Team
- 1920 and 1922: Glamorgan

Career statistics
Competition	FC
Matches	3
Runs scored	13
Batting average	2.16
100s/50s	–/–
Top score	4
Balls bowled	353
Wickets	7
Bowling average	29.85
5 wickets in innings	–
10 wickets in match	–
Best bowling	4/79
Catches/stumpings	–/–
- Source: Cricinfo, 28 June 2010

Edward Hugh James (14 April 1896 – 15 March 1975) was a Welsh cricketer. James was a left-handed batsman who bowled slow left-arm orthodox. He was born at Briton Ferry, Glamorgan.

James made his debut for Glamorgan in the 1920 Minor Counties Championship against Cheshire. He represented the county in 1 further Minor Counties fixtures in 1920, which came against Devon. Glamorgan were elevated to first-class status in 1921 and in 1922, James made his first-class debut for the county against Lancashire. James played 2 further first-class matches for the county in 1922 against Yorkshire and Nottinghamshire. A bowler, he took 7 wickets at a bowling average of 29.85, with best figures of 4/79.

James died at the town of his birth on 15 March 1975.

== Family ==
His son David also played first-class cricket for Glamorgan.
