= Nick James (critic) =

British film critic and former editor

Nick James is a British film critic and former editor of the Sight & Sound magazine. He held the position at Sight & Sound from 1997 until August 2019, when he stepped down. He had also previously written for The Guardian, The Observer, The Independent, US Vogue, the London Review of Books, and The Literary Review. He is an alumnus of the Saint Martin's School of Art.
