= Hugh James (physician) =

Scottish physician and surgeon

Hugh James (1750–February 1797) was a Scottish physician and surgeon.

Hugh James was the son of William James Hugh and Jane Senhouse. Born into a Scottish family, well-established in Jamaica, Hugh James became well known as a physician on the island. He may have studied and practiced medicine in Edinburgh before returning to Jamaica, as one Dr. Hugh James of Edinburgh recommended future revolutionary Jean-Paul Marat for a medical degree at St. Andrews University in 1775. He was elected as a member to the American Philosophical Society in 1785. Along with William Buchan, he recommended Jean-Paul Marat for a medical degree from St. Andrews.

In 1787, back in Jamaica, he served as Physician General for Cornwall County in the Jamaican militia. James earned a name for himself testing new and innovative treatments, including the use of yellow cinchona bark as a treatment for fever. He suffered and survived a bout of yellow fever himself, a disease not uncommon in Jamaica in those days. James’ familiarity with the disease in his correspondence indicates an intimate knowledge of the sickness and its treatments and remedies.

He married his second wife Elizabeth Williams, on June 8, 1794 in Westmoreland. The name of his first wife is not known. From his first marriage, he had four children: Marion, Jane Susanna, William John, and Hugo. With Elizabeth, he had three more children: Hugo, Cordelia, and Eliza.

He died of a fever and dysentery not long after purchasing a plantation in Westmoreland Parish, Jamaica.
