= Jeremy James (sculptor) =

English sculptor

Jeremy James is a figurative sculptor, working mostly in fired ceramic. He is known for lively renditions of hares, cockerels, wading birds, and human figures. His work is featured in exhibits across the United Kingdom and collected by private individuals as well as national galleries and collections.
