= Martin James (cricketer) =

English cricketer

Personal information
- Full name: Martin Harold James
- Born: 26 October 1963 (age 63); Enfield, Middlesex, England
- Batting: Left-handed
- Role: Occasional wicket-keeper
- Relatives: Kevan James (brother)

Domestic team information
- Years: Team
- 1991–2003: Hertfordshire

Career statistics
Competition	List A
Matches	9
Runs scored	89
Batting average	9.88
100s/50s	–/–
Top score	26
Catches/stumpings	1/–
- Source: Cricinfo, 17 May 2011

Martin Henry James (born 26 October 1963) is a former English cricketer. James was a left-handed batsman who fielded occasionally as a wicket-keeper. He was born in Enfield, Middlesex.

James had a long career for Hertfordshire, playing 70 matches between 1991 and 2003, and scoring 3,915 runs in total at an average of 32.90. He was captain of Hertfordshire from 2001 to 2003. His highest score in minor counties cricket was 143, against Suffolk in August 1997, in a game in which he scored centuries in both innings.

In 1993, he made his List A debut against Gloucestershire in the NatWest Trophy. He made 8 further List A appearances for the county, the last coming against Bedfordshire in the 1st round of the 2003 Cheltenham & Gloucester Trophy, which was held in 2002. In his 9 List A matches, he scored 89 runs at a batting average of 9.88, with a high score of 26.

His brother, Kevan, played first-class cricket.
