= Fred James (Australian footballer) =

Australian rules footballer

Personal information
- Full name: Frederick William James
- Born: 9 May 1884; St Arnaud, Victoria
- Died: 15 October 1948 (aged 64); Geelong, Victoria
- Original team: Mercantile

Playing career^{1}
Years	Club	Games (Goals)
1908	Geelong	2 (1)
- ^{1} Playing statistics correct to the end of 1908.

Frederick William James (9 May 1884 – 15 October 1948) was an Australian rules footballer who played with Geelong in the Victorian Football League (VFL).
