= Soling Masters World Championship =

International sailing regatta

The Soling Masters World Championship is an international sailing regatta in the Soling organized by the host club on behalf of the International Soling Association and recognised by World Sailing. The Soling used for the Olympic from 1972 through to the 2000 Olympic Games.

== Editions ==
Event			Host			Boats	Sailor					Ref.
Ed.	Date	Year	Host club	City	Country	Boats	No.			Nat.	Cont.	Ref.
1	19-24 Sep	1999	Hungarian Yachting Association	Lake Balaton	Hungary							
2	15-18 May	2001	Segel-Club Edersee	Edersee	Germany							
3	5-8 Sep	2002	Union-Yacht-Club Attersee	Attersee (lake)	Austria	18	54	52	2	6	2	
4	31Aug -4Sep	2003	Circolo Vela Torbole	Nago–Torbole, Lake Garda	Italy							
5	26-29 Jul	2004	Sheridan Shore Yacht Club	Wilmette, Cook Co., Illinois	United States	12	36	33	3	5	3	
6	17-12 May	2005		Lake Balaton	Hungary	9	27	26	1	3	1	
7	31Aug -3Sep	2006	Union-Yacht-Club Attersee	Attersee (lake)	Austria	11	33	30	3	4	1	
8	7-9 Sep	2007	Sailing Association Alto Sebino	Lake Iseo, Lovere, BG	Italy	18	54	50	4	5	2	
9	1-4 May	2008	Chiemsee Yacht Club	Chiemsee, Bavaria	Germany	20	60	57	3	9	3	
10	16-20 Jul	2009	Union-Yacht-Club Wolfgangsee	Lake Wolfgang, St. Gilgen, Salzburg	Austria	10	30	28	2	3	1	
11	30Sep -3Oct	2010	Bayerischen Yacht Club	Lake Starnberg, Starnberg, Bavaria	Germany	24	72	68	4	9	3	
12	17-19 Jun	2011	Sailing Association Alto Sebino	Lake Iseo, Lovere, BG	Italy	12	36	36	0	7	3	
13	21-24 Apr	2012	Hungarian Yachting Association	Lake Balaton	Hungary	13	39	36	3	7	2	
14	5-13 May	2013		Traunsee	Germany	10	40	28	2	3	2	
15	22-24 Aug	2014	Union-Yacht-Club Attersee	Attersee (lake)	Austria	22	66	62	4	4	1	

== Medalists ==
Year	Gold	Silver	Bronze	Ref
1999				
2001				
2002	AUT-117; Carl Auteried Jnr. (AUT) Thomas Beclin (AUT); Martin Kendler (AUT)	HUN-77; George Wossala (HUN) Laszlo Kovacsi (HUN); Karoly Vezer (HUN)	AUT-116; Franz Wageneder (AUT) Rudolf Rager (AUT); Rudolf Hubauer (AUT)	
2003	GER 308; Karl Haist (GER) Jacob Carsten (GER); Daniel Diesing (GER)	HUN 77; George Wossala (HUN) Laszlo Kovacsi (HUN); Pepe Nemeth (HUN)	USA 842; Stuart H. Walker (USA) Chris Brown (sailor) (USA); Doug Lousp (USA)	
2004	CAN 1 William Abbott Jr (CAN) Paul Davis (NOR); Joanne Abbott (CAN)	USA 842; Stuart H. Walker (USA) Doug Loup (USA); Andrew Dize (USA)	USA 807; Joe Hoeksema (USA) Matias Collins (USA); Rose Hoeksema (USA)	
2005	AUT 117; Carl Auteried Jnr. (AUT) Martin Kendler (AUT); Udo Moser (AUT)	HUN 77; George Wossala (HUN) Laszlo Kovacsi (HUN); Pepe Nemeth (HUN)	HUN 53; GABOR Bankuty (HUN) GYORGY Galantha (HUN); Peter Szucs (HUN)	
2006	AUT 117; Carl Auteried Jnr. (AUT) Martin Kendler (AUT); Udo Moser (AUT)	AUT 130; Michael Farthofer (AUT) Christian Holler (AUT); Richard Holler (AUT)	HUN 77; George Wossala (HUN) Pepe Nemeth (HUN); Karoly Vezer (HUN)	
2007	AUT 117; Carl Auteried Jnr. (AUT) Martin Kendler (AUT); Udo Moser (AUT)	GER 308; Karl Haist (GER) Simon Haist (GER); Gernot Schreiber (GER)	HUN 77; George Wossala (HUN) Karoly Vezer (HUN); Pepe Nemeth (HUN)	
2008	GER 308; Karl Haist (GER) Simon Haist (GER); Daniel Diesing (GER)	HUN 77; George Wossala (HUN) Pepe Nemeth (HUN); Karoly Vezer (HUN)	GER 300; Roman Koch (GER) Maxl Koch (GER); Gregor Bornemann (GER)	
2009	HUN 77; George Wossala (HUN) Karoly Vezer (HUN); Pepe Nemeth (HUN)	AUT 117; Carl Auteried Jnr. (AUT) Martin Kendler (AUT); Udo Moser (AUT)	GER 308; Karl Haist (GER) Johann Lindner (GER); Simon Haist (GER)	
2010	GER 323; Uwe Steingroß (GER) Karsten Eller (GER); Tim Gieseke (GER)	GER 308; Karl Haist (GER) Maxl Haist (GER); Johann Lindner (GER)	HUN 77; George Wossala (HUN) Karoly Vezer (HUN); Pepe Nemeth (HUN)	
2011	CAN 225; Peter Hall (sailor) (CAN) Frank Lavrsen (DEN); Berend Vree (NED)	HUN 77; George Wossala (HUN) Pepe Nemeth (HUN); Karoly Vezer (HUN)	GER 323; Jörg Herrmann (GER) Karsten Eller (GER); Tim Gieseke (GER)	
2012	HUN 77; George Wossala (HUN) Pepe Nemeth (HUN); Karoly Vezer (HUN)	GER 304; Thomas Maschkiwitz (GER) Stefan Wenzel (GER); Christoph Wossala (GER)	CAN 225; Peter Hall (sailor) (CAN) Stephen Lacey (sailor) (CAN); Ben Medendorp (NED)	
2013	GER 323; Uwe Steingross (GER) Karsten Eller (GER); Tim Gieseke (GER)	AUT 1 Christian Holler (AUT) Michael Praxmarer (AUT); Peter Farbowski (AUT)	GER 209; Susanne Steingross (GER) Sven Rikwald (GER); Voker Stoof (GER)	
2014	GER 323; Uwe Steingross (GER) Tim Gieseke (GER); Karsten Eller (GER)	GER 1 Roman Koch (GER) Maxl Koch (GER); Gregor Bornemann (GER)	GER 308; Karl Haist (GER) Martin Zeileis (AUT); Irene Haist (GER)	

== Multiple World Champions ==
Position	Sailor	Country	Gold	Silver	Bronze	Total

== See also ==
- Soling World Championship
  - Soling World Championship results (1969–1979)
  - Soling World Championship results (1980–1984)
  - Soling World Championship results (1985–1989)
  - Soling World Championship results (1990–1994)
  - Soling World Championship results (1995–1999)
  - Soling World Championship results (2000–2009)
  - Soling World Championship results (2010–2019)
  - Soling World Championship results (2020–2029)
