= Soling European Championship results (2005–2009) =

Soling
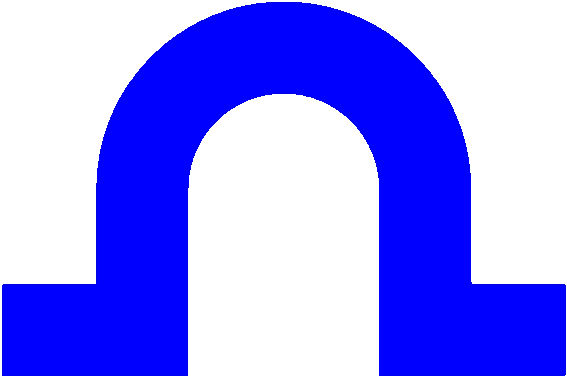

Development
- Name: Soling

The main article describes all European Soling Championships from one the first held in 1968 to the announced Championships in the near future. This article states the detailed results, where relevant the controversies, and the progression of the Championship during the series race by race of the European Soling Championships in the years 2005, 2006, 2007, 2008 and 2009. This is based on the major sources: World Sailing, the world governing body for the sport of sailing recognized by the IOC and the IPC, and the publications of the International Soling Association. Unfortunately not all crew names are documented in the major sources.

== 2005 Final results ==
2005
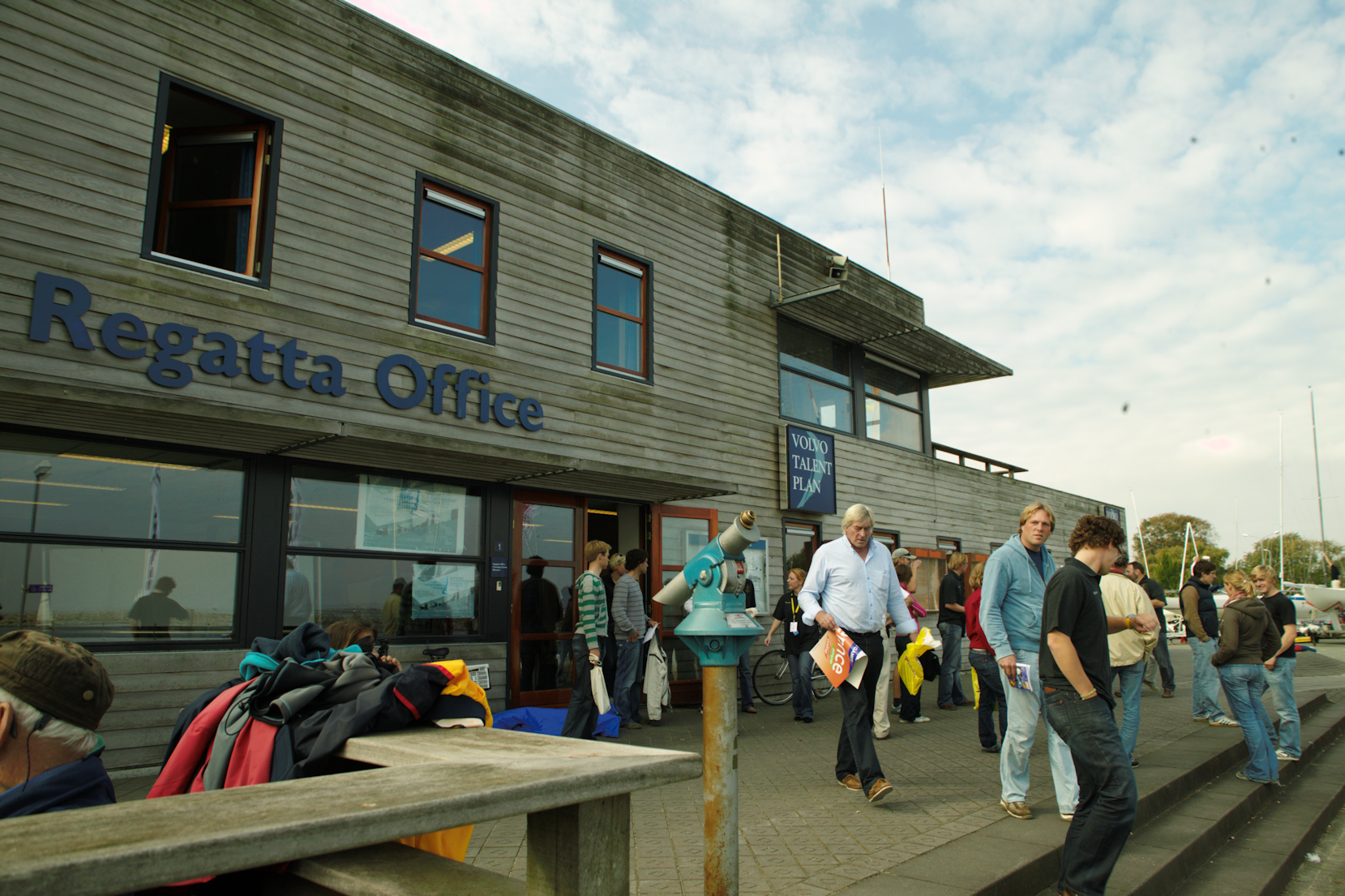

Event title
- Edition: 38
- Host: Koninklijke Zeil- en Roei Vereeniging Hollandia

Event details
- Venue: Medemblik, Netherlands
- Dates: 7–12 August
- Yachts: 20
- Key people: Nancy Schoof, Frouk Segaar
- Opened by: Margriet Pannevis
- Opening ceremony: 6 August

Competitors
- Competitors: 60
- Competing nations: 7

Results
- (gold) Gold: Germany; Roman Koch; Maxl Koch; Gregor Bornemann
- (silver) Silver: Hungary; György Wossala; Károly Vezér; Pepe Németh
- (bronze) Bronze: Norway; Dag Usterud; Arne Ottestad; Eskil Goldeng

Rank	Country	Helmsman	Crew	Sail No.	Race 1		Race 2		Race 3		Race 4		Race 5		Race 6		Race 7		Total	Total – discard
Rank	Country	Helmsman	Crew	Sail No.	Pos.	Pts.	Pos.	Pts.	Pos.	Pts.	Pos.	Pts.	Pos.	Pts.	Pos.	Pts.	Pos.	Pts.	Total	Total – discard
1st place, gold medalist(s)	GER	Roman Koch	Maxl Koch; Gregor Bornemann	GER 300	1	1	5	5	1	1	3	3	1	1	1	1	~~DNS~~	~~21~~	33	12
2nd place, silver medalist(s)	HUN	György Wossala	Károly Vezér; Pepe Németh	HUN 77	2	2	3	3	6	6	2	2	~~7~~	~~7~~	3	3	1	1	24	17
3rd place, bronze medalist(s)	NOR	Dag Usterud	Arne Ottestad; Eskil Goldeng	NOR 133	3	3	2	2	~~5~~	~~5~~	1	1	3	3	4	4	5	5	23	18
4	NED	Johan Offermans	Hans Zijlstra; Bas Dusee	NED 25	4	4	4	4	2	2	~~7~~	~~7~~	5	5	2	2	2	2	26	19
5	NED	Rudy den Outer	Leo Determan; Ronald den Arend	NED 33	5	5	1	1	3	3	5	5	2	2	~~10~~	~~10~~	4	4	30	20
6	GBR	Mike Preston	Ron Preston; Bryan Bottomley	GBR 170	6	6	6	6	4	4	4	4	6	6	~~11~~	~~11~~	6	6	43	32
7	NED	Bram Soethoudt	Gilbert Figaroa; Geert Verheij	NED-38	10	10	8	8	~~14~~	~~14~~	10	10	4	4	8	8	7	7	61	47
8	USA	Matias Collins	Iain Loudon; Maarten de Boers	USA 807	8	8	9	9	8	8	8	8	~~DNF~~	~~21~~	7	7	9	9	70	49
9	GBR	Gary Richardson	Karl Sloane; Stewart Lee	GBR155	7	7	10	10	7	7	~~13~~	~~13~~	10	10	5	5	11	11	63	50
10	DEN	Frank Højlund Lavrsen	Poul Andreasen; Carsten Odby Moesgaard	DEN 112	9	9	~~15~~	~~15~~	13	13	9	9	8	8	9	9	8	8	71	56
11	GER	Heino von Schuckmann	Markus Marquardt; Christian Mack	GER 318	15	15	11	11	10	10	6	6	16	16	6	6	~~DSQ~~	~~21~~	85	64
12	GER	Jan Carl Kochen	Deertz Bernd; Alexander Holl	GER 267	~~17~~	~~17~~	14	14	9	9	12	12	12	12	14	14	3	3	81	64
13	NOR	Pål Kristiansen	Torben von Huth; Elisabeth Sedivy	NOR 141	13	13	7	7	~~15~~	~~15~~	15	15	11	11	12	12	10	10	83	68
14	GBR	Paul Allen	Derek Priestley; Gary Adams	GBR 164	12	12	12	12	16	16	11	11	9	9	~~DSQ~~	~~21~~	12	12	93	72
15	GBR	Hamish Loudon	Bas Fountain; Mark Brammer	GBR 161	11	11	13	13	~~19~~	~~19~~	16	16	13	13	15	15	13	13	100	81
16	GBR	Peter Hewitson	Judith Hewitson; Peter Dilks	GBR167	~~16~~	~~16~~	16	16	12	12	14	14	15	15	13	13	14	14	100	84
17	NED	Jos Soethoudt	Andre Kijzer; Lion charmant	NED 21	~~19~~	~~19~~	18	18	11	11	17	17	14	14	17	17	15	15	111	92
18	GER	Gernot Heller	Peter Günther; Dirk Hensel	GER 312	18	18	17	17	~~20~~	~~20~~	18	18	17	17	16	16	17	17	123	103
19	GER	Harald Voigt	Gerold Zauner; Anton Hüttl	GER 127	~~20~~	~~20~~	19	19	17	17	20	20	18	18	18	18	16	16	128	108
20	GER	Emil Kuchta	Sabine Kuchta; Susanne Kuchta	GER 243	16	16	~~DNF~~	~~21~~	18	18	19	19	19	19	19	19	18	18	130	109

Legend: DNC – Did not come to the starting area; DNF – Did not finish; DNS – Did not start; DSQ – Disqualified; PMS – Premature start;
Discard is crossed out and does not count for the overall result.

- 2005 Progress

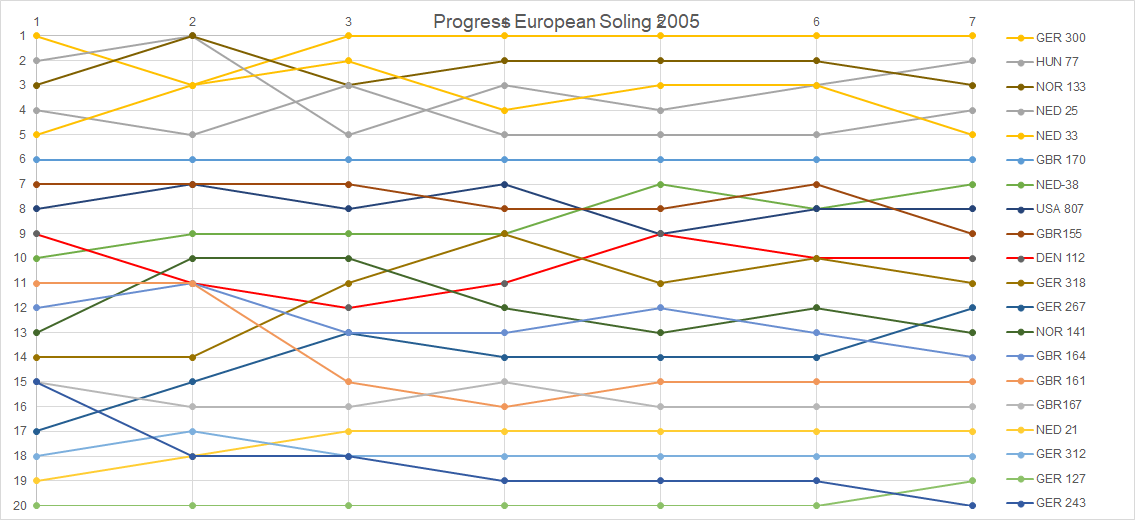

== 2006 Final results ==
2006
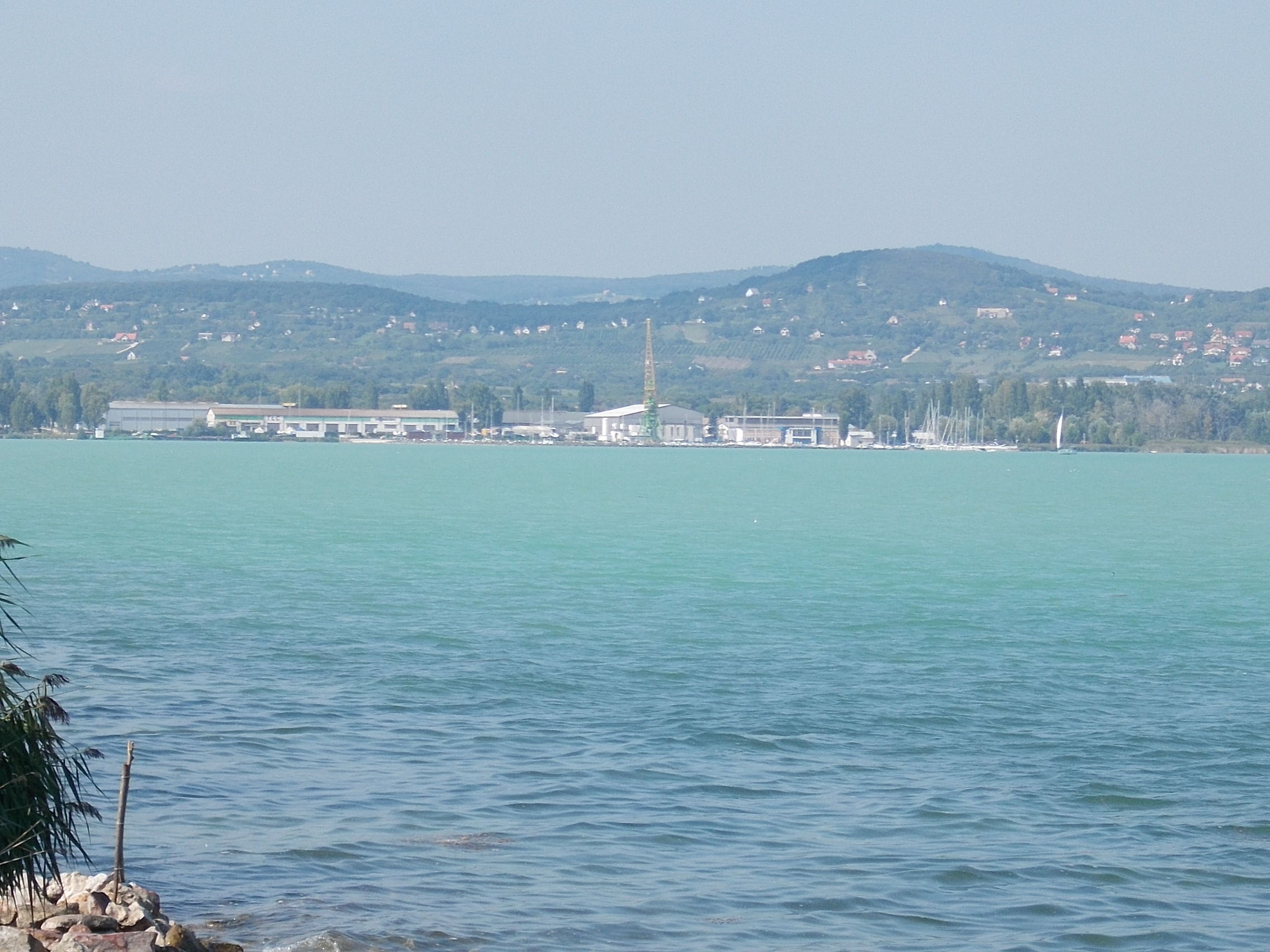

Event title
- Edition: 39
- Host: Hungarian Yachting Association

Event details
- Venue: Balatonfüred, Hungary
- Dates: 13–19 May
- Yachts: 25
- Key people: György Wossala
- Opening ceremony: 13 May

Competitors
- Competitors: 75
- Competing nations: 12

Results
- (gold) Gold: Ukraine; Serhiy Pichuhin; Serhiy Timokhov; Ivan Chehlatiy
- (silver) Silver: Germany; Roman Koch; Maxl Koch; Gregor Bornemann
- (bronze) Bronze: Austria; Carl Auteried Jr. Martin Kendler; Udo Moser

Rank	Country	Helmsman	Crew	Sail No.	Race 1		Race 2		Race 3		Race 4		Race 5		Race 6		Race 7		Race 8		Total	Total – discard
Rank	Country	Helmsman	Crew	Sail No.	Pos.	Pts.	Pos.	Pts.	Pos.	Pts.	Pos.	Pts.	Pos.	Pts.	Pos.	Pts.	Pos.	Pts.	Pos.	Pts.	Total	Total – discard
1st place, gold medalist(s)	UKR	Serhiy Pichuhin	Serhiy Timokhov; Ivan Chehlatiy	UKR 1	2	2	1	1	2	2	1	1	3	3	3	3	1	1	~~4~~	~~4~~	17	13
2nd place, silver medalist(s)	GER	Roman Koch	Maxl Koch; Gregor Bornemann	GER 300	4	4	2	2	4	4	~~OCS~~	~~26~~	1	1	2	2	4	4	1	1	44	18
3rd place, bronze medalist(s)	AUT	Carl Auteried Jr.	Martin Kendler; Udo Moser	AUT 117	~~7~~	~~7~~	4	4	3	3	7	7	2	2	1	1	7	7	5	5	36	29
4	HUN	György Wossala	Pepe Németh; Károly Vezér	HUN 77	~~11~~	~~11~~	3	3	1	1	5	5	6	6	8	8	5	5	2	2	41	30
5	SLO	Bostjan Antoncic	Gennadi Strakh; Željko Petrović	SLO 1	1	1	~~12~~	~~12~~	5	5	3	3	4	4	4	4	11	11	3	3	43	31
6	GER	Holger Weichert	Laurent Scheel; Ingo Herrmann	GER 49	6	6	6	6	7	7	6	6	7	7	5	5	2	2	~~OCS~~	~~26~~	65	39
7	DEN	Frank Højlund Lavrsen	Claus Lauritsen; Jeppe Djurtoft	DEN 126	9	9	5	5	~~12~~	~~12~~	8	8	5	5	12	12	3	3	10	10	64	52
8	AUT	Christian Nothhaft	Martin Zeileis; Patrick Wichmann	AUT 121	~~21~~	~~21~~	17	17	6	6	4	4	9	9	9	9	8	8	8	8	82	61
9	HUN	Mandaraz Tamas	Kovasci Lazslo; Kelecsenyi Peter	HUN 17	5	5	7	7	20	20	2	2	8	8	~~DSQ~~	~~26~~	13	13	9	9	90	64
10	NED	Johan Offermans	Bas Dusee; Peter Mosch	NED 25	3	3	13	13	10	10	10	10	11	11	~~DSQ~~	~~26~~	19	19	7	7	99	73
11	NED	Bram Soethoudt	Gilbert Figaroa; Geert Verheij	NED 38	8	8	11	11	9	9	9	9	~~19~~	~~19~~	7	7	15	15	15	15	93	74
12	GER	Markus Marquardt	Heino von Schuckmann; Tobias Hanke	GER 318	12	12	10	10	11	11	12	12	~~16~~	~~16~~	6	6	12	12	13	13	92	76
13	NOR	Preben Asbjørnrød	Richard Fikse; Bernt Ole Christensen	NOR 128	10	10	9	9	8	8	~~OCS~~	~~26~~	15	15	14	14	9	9	OCS	26	117	91
14	GER	Jan Carl Kochen	Deertz Bernd; Alexander Holl	GER 267	14	14	8	8	14	14	16	16	12	12	13	13	~~23~~	~~23~~	14	14	114	91
15	GBR	Derek Priestley	Shaun Priestley; Gary Adams	GBR 169	13	13	15	15	16	16	~~19~~	~~19~~	21	21	11	11	16	16	6	6	117	96
16	CAN	Tom Mitchell	Robin Earle; Dave Richards	CAN 227	~~17~~	~~17~~	14	14	24	24	14	14	17	17	16	16	6	6	12	12	120	96
17	USA	Matias Collins	Johann Kalhs; Dominik Meissner	USA 807	16	16	19	19	13	13	11	11	~~20~~	~~20~~	17	17	14	14	16	16	126	106
18	HUN	Peter Szucs	Istvan Szucs; Gabor Gyulai	HUN 53	19	19	16	16	18	18	13	13	14	14	10	10	~~22~~	~~22~~	18	18	130	108
19	HUN	Paal Laszlo	Zoltan Sabjan; Zoltán Nyiri	HUN 290	18	18	~~21~~	~~21~~	15	15	21	21	18	18	18	18	10	10	11	11	132	111
20	NOR	Finn Thorkildsen	Rolf Carstensen; Jan Kirkedam	NOR 135	15	15	18	18	17	17	15	15	10	10	20	20	~~21~~	~~21~~	17	17	133	112
21	NOR	Jan Krøger	Kenneth Norby; Petter Hammarstrøm	NOR 148	20	20	~~23~~	~~23~~	19	19	17	17	13	13	15	15	17	17	21	21	145	122
22	GER	Emil Kuchta	Jörg Schmidt; Susanne Kuchta	GER 243	22	22	20	20	~~22~~	~~22~~	18	18	22	22	19	19	20	20	19	19	162	140
23	GER	Harald Voigt	Heinz Herzer; Stefan Lutzenberger	GER 228	23	23	22	22	21	21	20	20	~~DNC~~	~~26~~	DNC	26	18	18	20	20	176	150
24	ITA	Luca Montanarella	Gergely Toth; Francesco Attardo	ITA 241	24	24	24	24	23	23	22	22	23	23	22	22	24	24	~~DNF~~	~~26~~	188	162
25	HUN	Imre Vrabély	László Schmutz; Ádám Vrabély	HUN 777	25	25	25	25	25	25	25	25	24	24	21	21	25	25	~~DNF~~	~~26~~	196	170

Legend: DNC – Did not come to the starting area; DNF – Did not finish; DNS – Did not start; DSQ – Disqualified; PMS – Premature start;
Discard is crossed out and does not count for the overall result.

- 2006 Progress

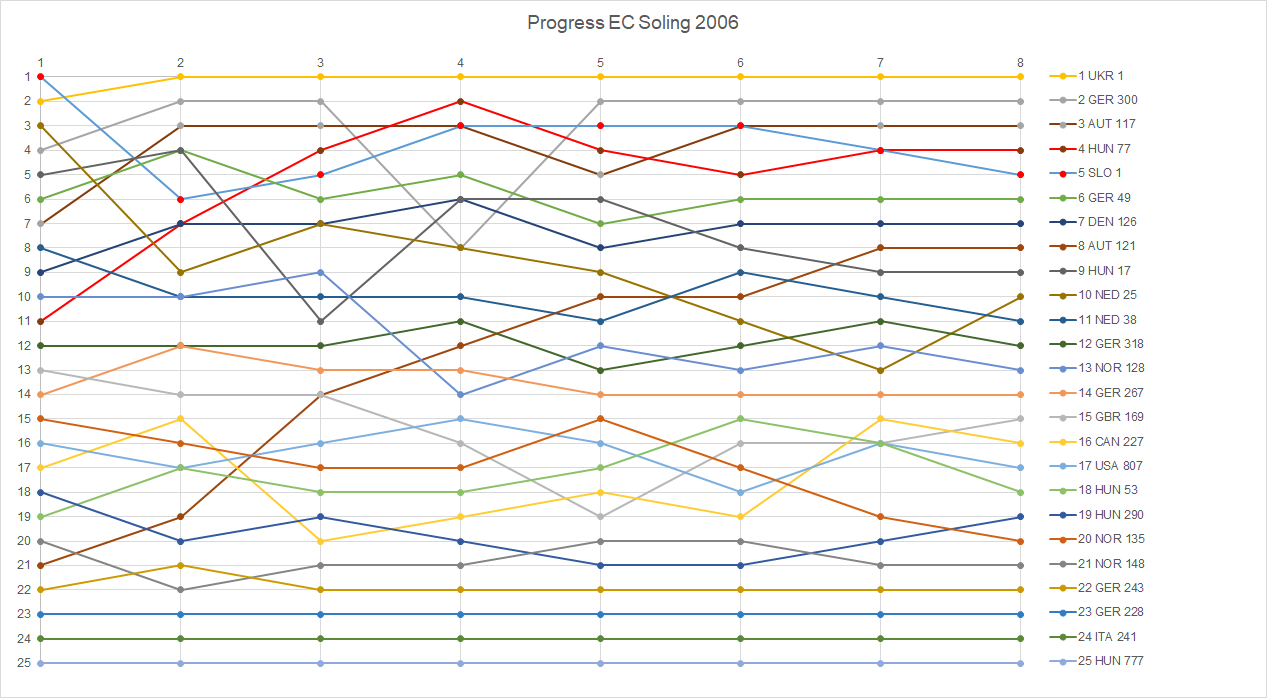

== 2007 Final results ==
=== Controversion ===
After the finish of the last race a protest was lodged by ITA 198 against SLO 1. An illegal helmsman swap was observed by ITA and the judges. The protest should have been handled by the International Jury. However, one of the overseas members of the jury needed to catch a plane so that the jury did not comply with the rules for an international jury. The decision was that SLO 1 was disqualified and GER 304 became European championship. SLO 1 made an appeal and since there was no International Jury the appeal was handled by a Norwegian appeal committee. That committee ruled different than the original verdict and SLO1 was reinstated. The final result is found below:

2007
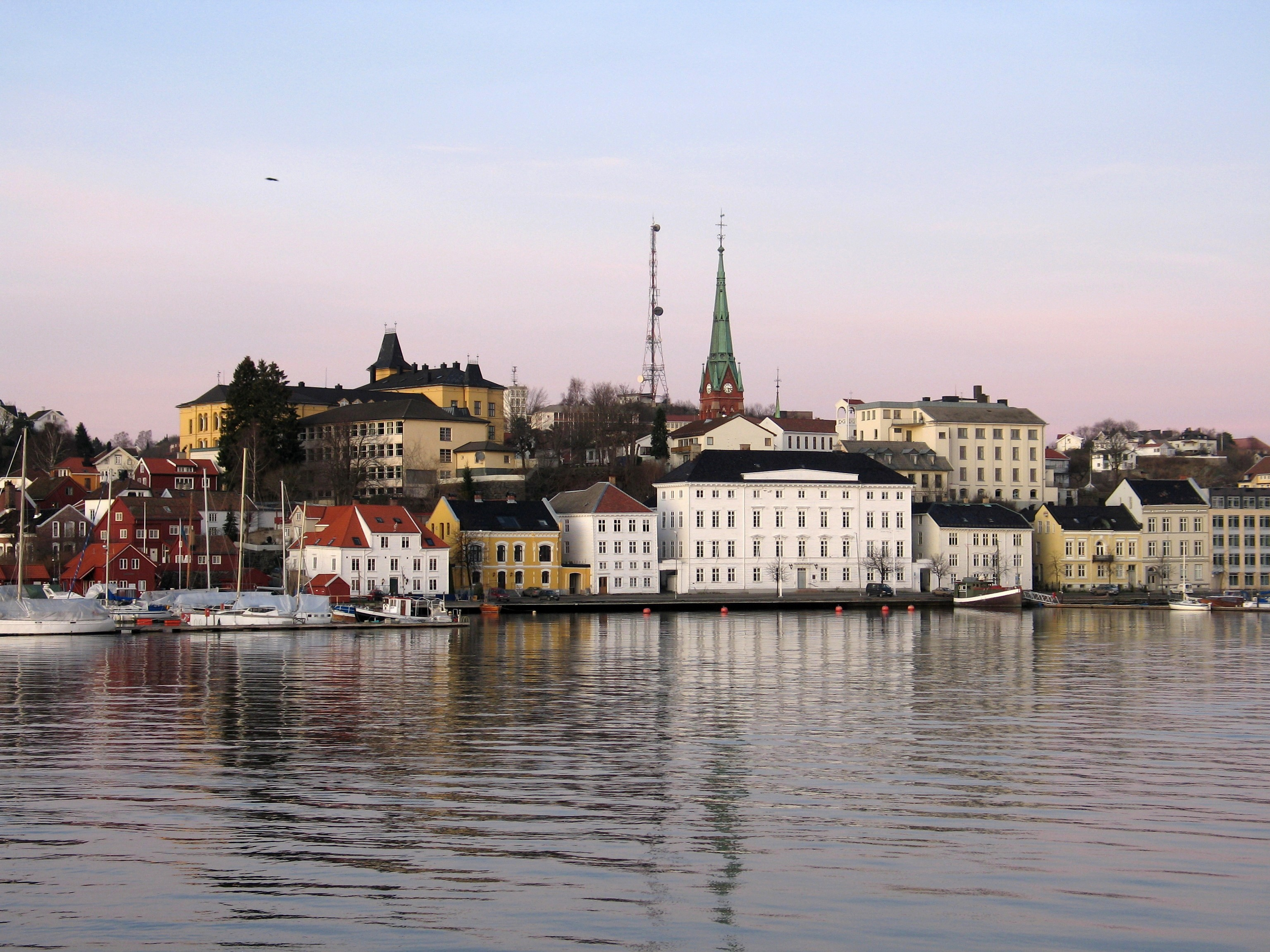

Event title
- Edition: 40
- Host: Arendals Seilforening (ASF)

Event details
- Venue: Arendal, Norway
- Dates: 28 July – 3 August
- Yachts: 52
- Key people: Jan Kirkedam
- Opening ceremony: 27 July

Competitors
- Competitors: 156
- Competing nations: 14

Results
- (gold) Gold: Slovenia; Boštjan Antončič; Serhiy Pichuhin; Gennadi Strakh
- (silver) Silver: Germany; Thomas Maschkiwitz; Christian Oehler; Christoph Wossala
- (bronze) Bronze: Argentina; Gustavo Warburg; Maximo Smith; Miguel Lacour

Rank	Country	Helmsman	Crew	Sail No.	Race 1		Race 2		Race 3		Race 4		Race 5		Race 6		Race 7		Race 8		Race 9		Total	Total – discard
Rank	Country	Helmsman	Crew	Sail No.	Pos.	Pts.	Pos.	Pts.	Pos.	Pts.	Pos.	Pts.	Pos.	Pts.	Pos.	Pts.	Pos.	Pts.	Pos.	Pts.	Pos.	Pts.	Total	Total – discard
1st place, gold medalist(s)	SLO	Boštjan Antončič	Serhiy Pichuhin; Gennadi Strakh	SLO 1	9	9	4	4	2	2	~~18~~	~~18~~	6	6	6	6	4	4	1	1	3	3	53	35
2nd place, silver medalist(s)	GER	Thomas Maschkiwitz	Christian Oehler; Christoph Wossala	GER 304	2	2	6	6	3	3	4	4	5	5	1	1	7	7	7	7	~~8~~	~~8~~	43	35
3rd place, bronze medalist(s)	ARG	Gustavo Warburg	Maximo Smith; Miguel Lacour	ARG 32	3	3	3	3	13	13	1	1	7	7	2	2	5	5	4	4	~~15~~	~~15~~	53	38
4	ITA	Andy Vinçon	Thomas Olbrich; Peter Dörsch	ITA 198	7	7	5	5	~~12~~	~~12~~	10	10	3	3	4	4	6	6	5	5	6	6	58	46
5	HUN	György Wossala	Károly Vezér; Pepe Németh	HUN 77	6	6	~~OCS~~	~~53~~	9	9	2	2	9	9	16	16	2	2	9	9	2	2	108	55
6	NED	Rudy den Outer	Leo Determan; Ronald den Arend	NED 33	13	13	16	16	1	1	5	5	2	2	~~19~~	~~19~~	8	8	12	12	7	7	83	64
7	NED	Johan Offermans	Bas Dusee; Oliver Dusee	NED 25	8	8	7	7	8	8	9	9	~~20~~	~~20~~	14	14	10	10	14	14	4	4	94	74
8	GER	Holger Weichert	Laurent Scheel; Martin Setzkorn	GER 49	5	5	1	1	15	15	17	17	~~23~~	~~23~~	12	12	12	12	10	10	14	14	109	86
9	GER	Roman Koch	Maxl Koch; Gregor Bornemann	GER 300	1	1	~~OCS~~	~~53~~	21	21	7	7	1	1	DSQ	53	1	1	2	2	1	1	140	87
10	NOR	Preben Asbjørnrød	Richard Fikse; Hans Jorgen Husum	NOR 128	15	15	2	2	20	20	16	16	18	18	8	8	~~23~~	~~23~~	6	6	5	5	113	90
11	DEN	Frank Højlund Lavrsen	Claus Lauritsen; Carsten Odby Moesgaard	DEN 126	4	4	15	15	~~26~~	~~26~~	8	8	8	8	22	22	16	16	13	13	12	12	124	98
12	NOR	Kjetil Solvang	Vidar Tregde; Terje Antonisen	NOR 135	21	21	23	23	4	4	~~OTL~~	~~40~~	13	13	7	7	13	13	8	8	11	11	140	100
13	NED	Bram Soethoudt	Berend Vree; Geert Verheij	NED 38	19	19	18	18	5	5	14	14	~~22~~	~~22~~	9	9	17	17	11	11	19	19	134	112
14	NOR	Jorgen Stromquist	Erlend Haugland Naes; Knut Frederik	NOR 139	14	14	17	17	7	7	~~OTL~~	~~40~~	12	12	25	25	15	15	16	16	20	20	166	126
15	NOR	Frode Kirkedam	Lars Ingeberg; Tor Dahl	NOR 142	17	17	~~OCS~~	~~53~~	16	16	6	6	15	15	3	3	14	14	DSQ	53	9	9	186	133
16	NOR	Dag Usterud	Arne Ottestad; Eskil Goldeng	NOR 133	16	16	~~DNS~~	~~53~~	31	31	12	12	4	4	5	5	OCS	53	3	3	10	10	187	134
17	NOR	Ole Mortensen	Jan Gromstad; Ove Bessesen	NOR 100	36	36	~~OCS~~	~~53~~	11	11	13	13	11	11	10	10	18	18	15	15	28	28	195	142
18	BRA	Niels Rump	Paulo Lemos; Ribeiro Carlo de	BRA 78	11	11	10	10	24	24	OTL	40	16	16	15	15	9	9	~~OCS~~	~~53~~	18	18	196	143
19	NOR	Pål Kristiansen	Torben von Huth Anders Wilhelmsen	NOR 141	12	12	12	12	28	28	23	23	10	10	18	18	~~OCS~~	~~53~~	24	24	17	17	197	144
20	ITA	Giovanni Tognozzi	Georgios Nikoltsis; Luigi Seri	ITA 243	18	18	9	9	35	35	~~BFD~~	~~53~~	21	21	13	13	3	3	23	23	25	25	200	147
21	FRA	Hubert Lefevre	Marc Lefevre; Victor Lefevre	FRA 198	~~26~~	~~26~~	11	11	19	19	21	21	17	17	26	26	21	21	17	17	16	16	174	148
22	GER	Markus Marquardt	Heino von Schuckmann; Dominik Meissner	GER 318	28	28	8	8	25	25	24	24	19	19	~~DNF~~	~~53~~	25	25	19	19	24	24	225	172
23	USA	Charlie Kamps	Jack Freysinger; Hans Meyer	USA 832	~~OCS~~	~~53~~	OCS	53	15	15	3	3	33	33	20	20	20	20	18	18	13	13	228	175
24	ITA	Michele Tognozzi	Andrea Maramai; Giuliano Carotti	ITA 201	10	10	OTL	43	27	27	~~DSQ~~	~~53~~	14	14	17	17	11	11	27	27	35	35	237	184
25	NOR	Olaf Thon	Steinar Thon; Kristian Rod	NOR 127	32	32	21	21	10	10	15	15	25	25	~~36~~	~~36~~	31	31	27	27	27	27	224	188
26	NOR	Finn Thorkildsen	Rolf Carstensen; Jan Kirkedam	NOR 147	24	24	27	27	~~44~~	~~44~~	22	22	24	24	11	11	30	30	26	26	29	29	237	193
27	GER	Alexander Holl	Norbert Hellriegel; Christian Mack	GER 267	25	25	13	13	18	18	~~BFD~~	~~53~~	24	24	26	26	22	22	25	25	BFD	53	259	206
28	GER	Gernot Heller	Gerhard Auerswald; Karl Suck	GER 312	23	23	~~OTL~~	~~43~~	6	6	11	11	37	37	31	31	32	32	36	36	33	33	252	209
29	GBR	Derek Priestly	Gary Adams; Carl Sloane	GBR 164	20	20	26	26	~~43~~	~~43~~	19	19	27	27	29	29	33	33	33	33	31	31	261	218
30	USA	Matias Collins	Pablo Noceti; Pontus Berglund	USA 807	31	31	OTL	43	21	21	~~DSQ~~	~~53~~	30	30	21	21	19	19	32	32	26	26	276	223
31	DEN	John Nielsen	Ib Thorup-Pedersen; Rene Nielsen	DEN 128	22	22	25	25	23	23	~~DNF~~	~~53~~	29	29	27	27	35	35	DSQ	53	23	23	290	237
32	NOR	Christopher Mackrill	Andreas Brachel; Einar Lieng	NOR 124	37	37	22	22	40	40	~~DNF~~	~~53~~	32	32	23	23	34	34	29	29	22	22	292	239
33	NOR	Jan Krøger	Kenneth Norby; Petter Hammarstrøm	NOR 149	30	30	28	28	38	38	~~OTL~~	~~40~~	34	34	37	37	24	24	20	20	39	39	290	250
34	GER	Emil Kuchta	Andreas Hamacher; Susanne Kuchta	GER 243	29	29	19	19	29	29	OTL	40	38	38	28	28	37	37	34	34	~~41~~	~~41~~	295	254
35	NOR	Børre Zeiffert	Patrick Corrigan; Martin Zeiffert	NOR 146	35	35	24	24	33	33	~~DSQ~~	~~53~~	41	41	DNS	53	27	27	21	21	21	21	308	255
36	HUN	Istvan Szucs	Gabor Gyulai; Peter Szucs	HUN 17	42	42	20	20	32	32	OTL	40	28	28	~~DNF~~	~~53~~	28	28	30	30	38	38	311	258
37	AUT	Johann Kalhs	Karl Kronegger; Christian Kahls	AUT 136	38	38	14	14	30	30	OTL	40	31	31	33	33	44	44	~~DNF~~	~~53~~	34	34	317	264
38	NOR	Oivind Berntsen	Kristoff Nas; Frode Kristiansen	NOR 107	34	34	OTL	43	46	46	~~DNF~~	~~53~~	36	36	30	30	26	26	28	28	44	44	340	287
39	NOR	Erik Borge	Petter Borge; Espen Borge	NOR 145	27	27	OTL	43	36	36	OTL	40	49	49	~~DNF~~	~~53~~	36	36	38	38	30	30	352	299
40	NOR	Eilert Vierli	Nomen nescio Nomen nescio	NOR 140	42	42	OTL	43	39	39	OTL	40	42	42	~~DNF~~	~~53~~	29	29	31	31	36	36	355	302
41	NOR	Henning Olin	Erlend Munkeby; Nina Braaten	NOR 98	40	40	OTL	43	45	45	20	20	39	39	~~DNS~~	~~53~~	47	47	35	35	37	37	359	306
42	GBR	Bas Fountain	Nomen nescio Nomen nescio	GBR 169	33	33	OTL	43	34	34	OTL	40	35	35	37	37	~~46~~	~~46~~	42	42	43	43	353	307
43	GER	Harald Voigt	Heinz Herzer; Hartmut Enders	GER 228	39	39	OTL	43	17	17	DNF	53	43	43	~~DNS~~	~~53~~	39	39	37	37	45	45	369	316
44	NOR	Ulf Carlsen	Are Skinolo; Egil Rose	NOR 122	~~51~~	~~51~~	OTL	43	42	42	OTL	40	40	40	35	35	41	41	39	39	40	40	371	320
45	NOR	Svein Leikanger	Erik Berg-Jakobsen; Kveim Leikanger	NOR 111	44	44	OTL	43	47	47	~~DNF~~	~~53~~	44	44	32	32	38	38	41	41	32	32	374	321
46	NOR	Johan Nyland	Andre Kroneberg; Tore Svinoy	NOR 144	47	47	~~DNF~~	~~53~~	48	48	OTL	40	BFD	53	38	38	45	45	40	40	47	47	411	358
47	NOR	Ole Andresen	Lars Brotangen; Jens Petter Andresen	NOR 85	50	50	~~OCS~~	~~53~~	50	50	DNF	53	46	46	34	34	40	40	46	46	46	46	418	365
48	NOR	Per Strand	Merete; Ove Brynestad	NOR 53	45	45	OTL	43	37	37	~~DNF~~	~~53~~	47	47	DNF	53	43	43	DNF	53	DNS	53	427	374
49	NOR	Rune Hvass	Knut Baethre; Henrik Kaogle	NOR 117	49	49	~~DNF~~	~~53~~	49	49	DNF	53	45	45	39	39	48	48	44	44	49	49	429	376
50	NOR	Frank Ormstad	Erlina Nielsen; Lena Holte	NOR 65	46	46	~~DNF~~	~~53~~	51	51	DNF	53	48	48	40	40	49	49	45	45	48	48	433	380
51	SWE	Stefan Ågren	Danny Wikman; Daniel Agren	SWE 111	43	43	~~DNS~~	~~53~~	OCS	53	BFD	53	DNS	53	DNS	53	42	42	43	43	42	42	435	382
52	NOR	Tina Mikland	Nils-Jørgen Danielsen; Marianne Fremming	NOR 130	48	48	OTL	43	41	41	~~DNF~~	~~53~~	DNF	53	DNS	53	DNS	53	DNS	53	50	50	447	394

Legend: DNC – Did not come to the starting area; DNF – Did not finish; DNS – Did not start; DSQ – Disqualified; OTL – Over time limit; PMS – Premature start;
Discard is crossed out and does not count for the overall result.

- 2007 Progress

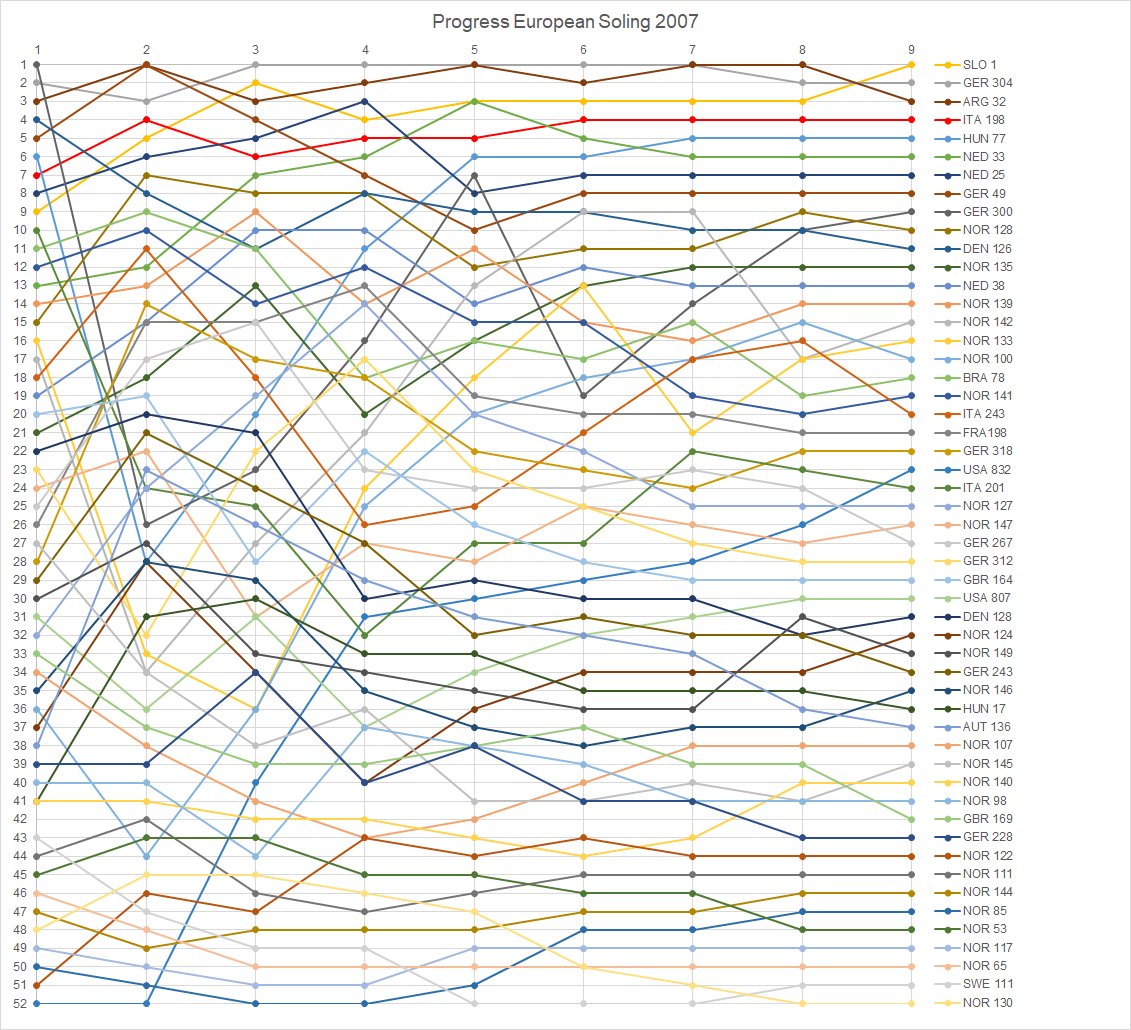

== 2008 Final results ==
2008
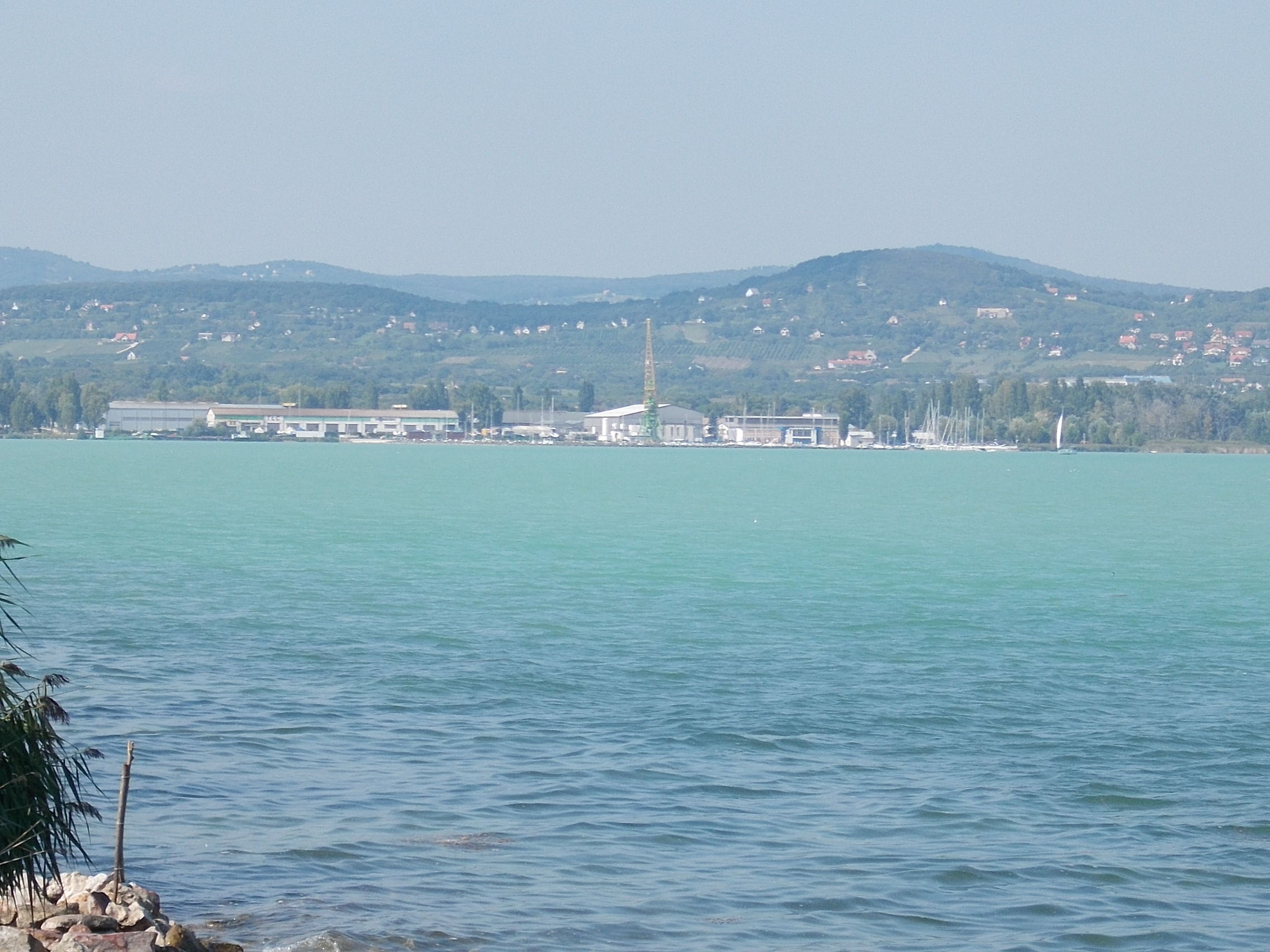

Event title
- Edition: 41
- Host: Hungarian Yachting Association

Event details
- Venue: Balatonfüred, Hungary
- Dates: 20–27 April
- Yachts: 19
- Key people: György Wossala
- Opening ceremony: 20 April

Competitors
- Competitors: 57
- Competing nations: 10

Results
- (gold) Gold: Hungary; György Wossala; Károly Vezér; Pepe Németh
- (silver) Silver: Germany; Roman Koch; Maxl Koch; Gregor Bornemann
- (bronze) Bronze: Netherlands; Johan Offermans; Bas Dusee; Dominik Meissner

Rank	Country	Helmsman	Crew	Sail No.	Race 1		Race 2		Race 3		Race 4		Race 5		Race 6		Race 7		Total	Total – discard
Rank	Country	Helmsman	Crew	Sail No.	Pos.	Pts.	Pos.	Pts.	Pos.	Pts.	Pos.	Pts.	Pos.	Pts.	Pos.	Pts.	Pos.	Pts.	Total	Total – discard
1st place, gold medalist(s)	HUN	György Wossala	Károly Vezér; Pepe Németh	HUN 77	5	5	1	1	~~11~~	~~11~~	2	2	1	1	2	2	2	2	24	13
2nd place, silver medalist(s)	GER	Roman Koch	Maxl Koch; Gregor Bornemann	GER 300	8	8	3	3	4	4	5	5	2	2	3	3	~~DNF~~	~~20~~	45	25
3rd place, bronze medalist(s)	NED	Johan Offermans	Bas Dusee; Dominik Meissner	NED 25	6	6	7	7	3	3	1	1	3	3	~~12~~	~~12~~	7	7	39	27
4	NOR	Preben Asbjørnrød	Richard Fikse; Hans Husum	NOR 128	3	3	4	4	6	6	3	3	5	5	~~8~~	~~8~~	8	8	37	29
5	GER	Thomas Maschkiwitz	Christian Oehler; Christian Haake	GER 304	~~OCS~~	~~20~~	2	2	1	1	6	6	OCS	20	1	1	3	3	53	33
6	POR	Antonio Tanger	László Kovácsi; Manuel Tanger	POR 1	2	2	~~11~~	~~11~~	10	10	4	4	9	9	6	6	4	4	46	35
7	AUT	Christian Nothhaft	Martin Zeileis; Patrick Wichmann	AUT 121	4	4	6	6	2	2	11	11	7	7	5	5	~~12~~	~~12~~	47	35
8	HUN	Peter Czegai	Krisztián Kutics; Adrián Homonnay	HUN 25	9	9	9	9	9	9	~~DNF~~	~~20~~	4	4	4	4	1	1	56	36
9	USA	Charlie Kamps	Matias Collins; Hans Meyer	USA 832	1	1	~~13~~	~~13~~	12	12	10	10	6	6	10	10	6	6	58	45
10	DEN	Frank Højlund Lavrsen	John Nielsen; Carsten Odby Moesgaard	DEN 126	11	11	5	5	7	7	8	8	~~12~~	~~12~~	9	9	9	9	61	49
11	GER	Thomas Scherer	Frank Ebus; Frank Schmidt-Burr	GER 292	12	12	~~18~~	~~18~~	5	5	9	9	8	8	11	11	5	5	68	50
12	GER	Holger Weichert	Laurent Scheel; Martin Setzkorn	GER 49	10	10	8	8	8	8	7	7	11	11	7	7	~~16~~	~~16~~	67	51
13	GBR	Derek Priestley	Shaun Priestley; Gary Adams	GBR 170	7	7	10	10	13	13	12	12	14	14	~~15~~	~~15~~	13	13	84	69
14	HUN	Peter Majoross	Both Lorinc; Bea Majoross	HUN 23	14	14	14	14	14	14	16	16	10	10	~~17~~	~~17~~	10	10	95	78
15	HUN	Király Zsolt	Tamás Stricz; Edelényi-Szabó Zsolt	HUN 290	13	13	16	16	15	15	~~17~~	~~17~~	13	13	14	14	14	14	102	85
16	ITA	Fabio Armellini	Attilia Papini; Nicola Armellini	ITA 209	16	16	15	15	16	16	14	14	~~17~~	~~17~~	16	16	11	11	105	88
17	HUN	Péter Biszkót	Szolossy Balazs; Erno Kruss	HUN 777	~~18~~	~~18~~	12	12	17	17	13	13	15	15	13	13	18	18	106	88
18	HUN	Istvan Szucs	Gyulai Gabor; Peter Szucs	HUN 17	15	15	~~19~~	~~19~~	19	19	15	15	18	18	18	18	15	15	119	100
19	HUN	Ádám Mihály	DanielMerczell; Mesko Kalman	HUN 7	17	17	17	17	18	18	18	18	16	16	~~19~~	~~19~~	17	17	122	103

Legend: DNF – Did not finish; OCS – On the course side of the starting line;
Discard is crossed out and does not count for the overall result.

- 2008 Progress

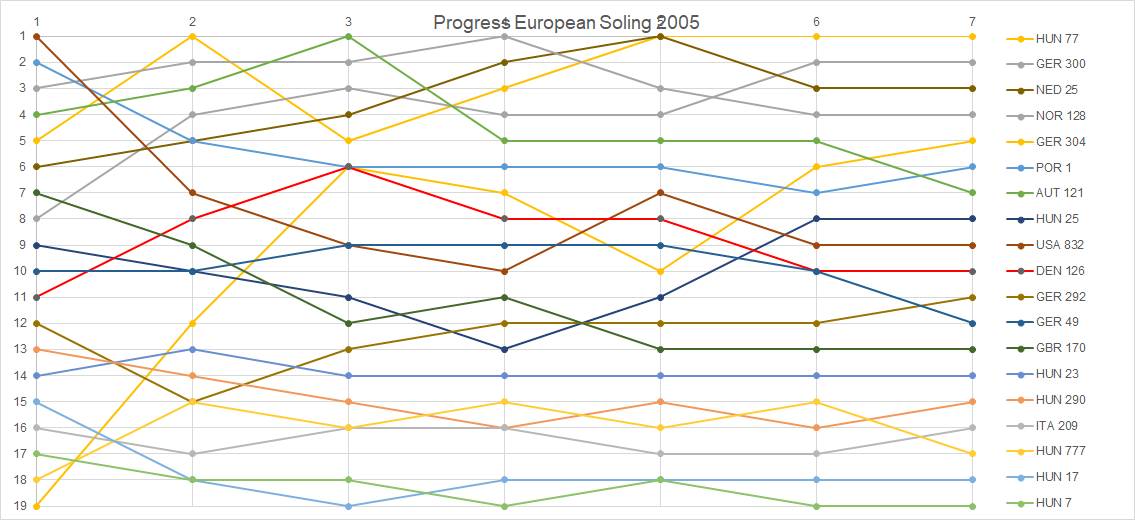

== 2009 Final results ==
2009
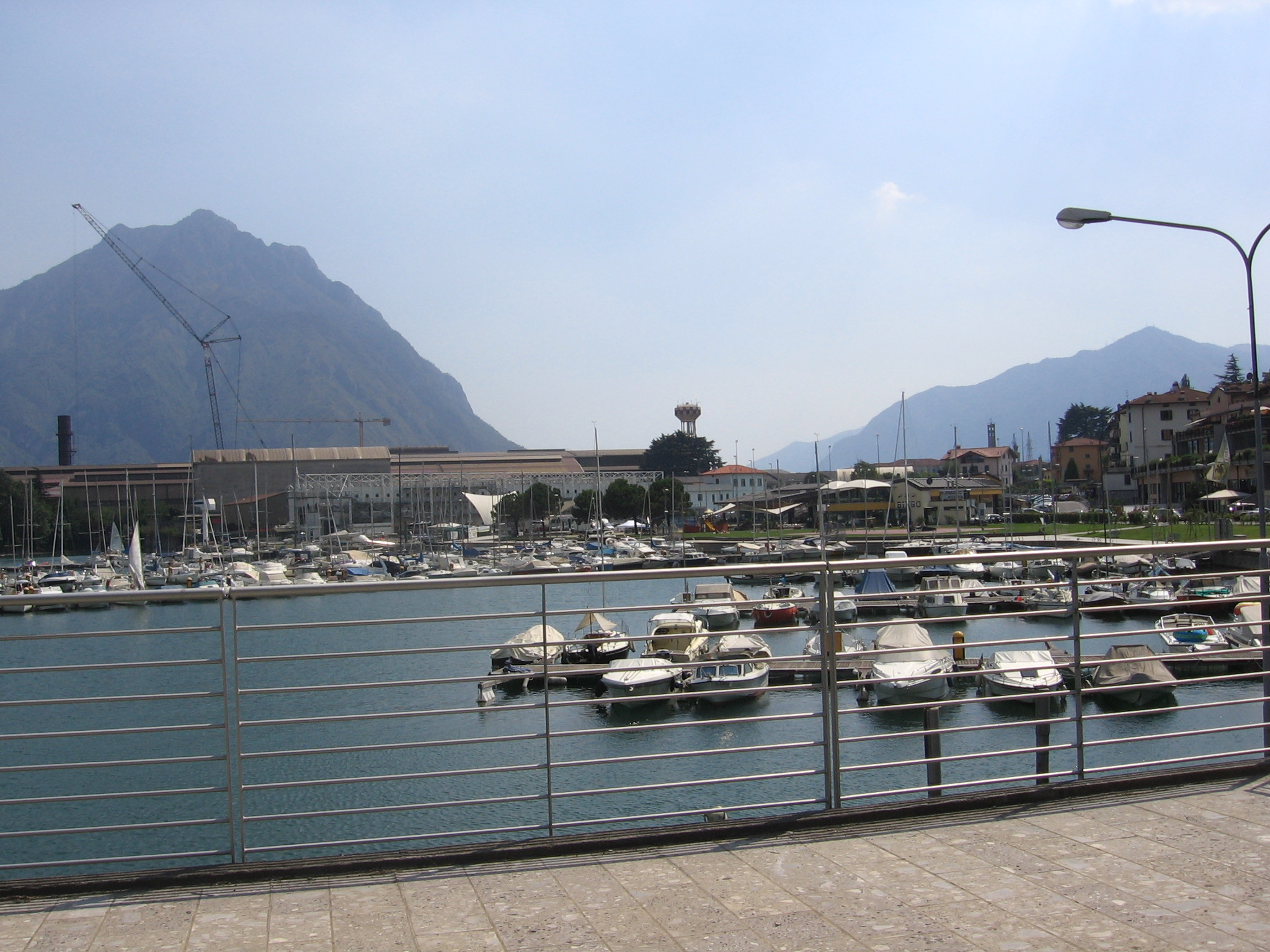

Event title
- Edition: 42
- Host: Associazione Velica Alto Sebino (AVAS)

Event details
- Venue: Lovere, Italy
- Dates: 31 July – 8 August
- Yachts: 36
- Opening ceremony: 31 July

Competitors
- Competitors: 108
- Competing nations: 10

Results
- (gold) Gold: Germany; Roman Koch; Maxl Koch; Gregor Bornemann
- (silver) Silver: Austria; Carl Auteried Jr. Martin Kendler; Udo Moser
- (bronze) Bronze: Hungary; György Wossala; Károly Vezér; Pepe Németh

Rank	Country	Helmsman	Crew	Sail No.	Race 1		Race 2		Race 3		Race 4		Race 5		Race 6		Race 7		Race 8		Race 9		Total	Total – discard
Rank	Country	Helmsman	Crew	Sail No.	Pos.	Pts.	Pos.	Pts.	Pos.	Pts.	Pos.	Pts.	Pos.	Pts.	Pos.	Pts.	Pos.	Pts.	Pos.	Pts.	Pos.	Pts.	Total	Total – discard
1st place, gold medalist(s)	GER	Roman Koch	Maxl Koch; Gregor Bornemann	GER 300	2	2	1	1	2	2	2	2	5	5	9	9	2	2	~~11~~	~~11~~	4	4	38	27
2nd place, silver medalist(s)	AUT	Carl Auteried Jr.	Martin Kendler; Udo Moser	AUT 117	7	7	3	3	3	3	3	3	6	6	1	1	5	5	1	1	~~8~~	~~8~~	37	29
3rd place, bronze medalist(s)	HUN	György Wossala	Károly Vezér; Pepe Németh	HUN 77	4	4	4	4	5	5	1	1	1	1	~~12~~	~~12~~	4	4	4	4	10	10	45	33
4	SLO	Boštjan Antončič	Gennadi Strakh; Mitja Nevecny	SLO 1	3	3	5	5	~~22~~	~~22~~	8	8	12	12	3	3	1	1	2	2	13	13	69	47
5	NED	Johan Offermans	Bas Dusee; Olivier Dusee	NED 25	1	1	6	6	7	7	10	10	10	10	~~20~~	~~20~~	3	3	9	9	11	11	77	57
6	USA	Matias Collins	Tomas Peuvrel; Emiliano Ingrassia	USA 853	~~17~~	~~17~~	15	15	6	6	5	5	3	3	8	8	6	6	6	6	9	9	75	58
7	NOR	Preben Asbjørnrød	Richard Fikse; Bernt Ole Christensen	NOR128	5	5	7	7	10	10	9	9	2	2	10	10	11	11	~~DNF~~	~~37~~	14	14	105	68
8	GER	Thomas Scherer	Andreas Baumüller; Jorg Goletz	GER 292	6	6	13	13	13	13	~~16~~	~~16~~	8	8	5	5	13	13	15	15	3	3	92	76
9	ITA	Giuseppe Rossi	Alessandro Sgorbati; Roberto Minola	ITA 189	~~23~~	~~23~~	8	8	12	12	18	18	16	16	6	6	10	10	8	8	1	1	102	79
10	USA	Charlie Kamps	Toby Kamps; Hans Meyer	USA 832	12	12	9	9	17	17	6	6	17	17	4	4	19	19	~~OCS~~	~~37~~	2	2	123	86
11	AUT	Peter Neumann	Rudolf Hubauer; Rudolf Rager	AUT 122	8	8	11	11	20	20	~~24~~	~~24~~	4	4	11	11	21	21	7	7	7	7	113	89
12	GER	Winfried Geisler	Bjorn Geisler; Sven Domges	GER 311	11	11	10	10	11	11	11	11	21	21	13	13	7	7	~~OCS~~	~~37~~	6	6	127	90
13	NED	Rudy den Outer	Gavin Lidlow; Ronald den Arend	NED 33	10	10	~~DSQ~~	~~37~~	8	8	12	12	7	7	18	18	17	17	17	17	5	5	131	94
14	GER	Heino von Schuckmann	Dominik Meissner; Tobias Hanke	GER 318	15	15	14	14	9	9	7	7	15	15	7	7	15	15	~~OCS~~	~~37~~	23	23	142	105
15	AUT	Christian Nothhaft	Martin Zeileis; Valentin Koch	AUT 121	16	16	~~31~~	~~31~~	4	4	14	14	19	19	16	16	16	16	12	12	16	16	144	113
16	ITA	Michele Tognozzi	Fabio Piccioni; Giuliano Carotti	ITA 251	21	21	12	12	25	25	19	19	~~DNF~~	~~37~~	27	27	8	8	3	3	12	12	164	127
17	GER	Thomas Maschkiwitz	Christian Oehler; Christoph Wossala	GER 304	13	13	2	2	1	1	4	4	~~OCS~~	~~37~~	2	2	DNF	37	DNS	37	DNS	37	170	133
18	DEN	Frank Højlund Lavrsen	Jacob Andersen; Mogens Jørgensen	DEN 126	22	22	19	19	16	16	15	15	~~29~~	~~29~~	14	14	23	23	14	14	15	15	167	138
19	ITA	Michele Campagnoni	Roberto Galloni; Carlo Peloni	ITA 159	25	25	17	17	27	27	22	22	14	14	21	21	12	12	5	5	~~DSQ~~	~~37~~	180	143
20	ITA	Virgilio Cadei	Mauro Bortolotti; Emanuele Bufano	ITA 213	24	24	20	20	~~30~~	~~30~~	21	21	13	13	15	15	18	18	13	13	20	20	174	144
21	GER	Gernot Heller	Gerhard Auerswald; Karl Suck	GER 312	26	26	16	16	24	24	20	20	9	9	26	26	~~29~~	~~29~~	10	10	18	18	178	149
22	NED	Bram Soethoudt	Berend Vree; Ramzi Souli	NED 38	9	9	24	24	19	19	17	17	18	18	28	28	~~27~~	~~27~~	19	19	25	25	186	158
23	ITA	Diego Motta	Torben von Huth; Francesca Sbardollini	ITA 24	~~OCS~~	~~37~~	21	21	18	18	30	30	26	26	25	25	9	9	26	26	17	17	209	172
24	ITA	Fabio Armellini	Attilia Papini; Nicola Armellini	ITA 289	14	14	23	23	21	21	28	28	23	23	~~31~~	~~31~~	20	20	21	21	24	24	205	174
25	ITA	Carlo Gallizioli	Raul Domenighini; Davide Arata	ITA 215	19	19	30	30	~~32~~	~~32~~	25	25	11	11	23	23	25	25	23	23	26	26	214	182
26	ITA	Giancarlo Bay	Lucio Cattaneo; Liana Bettinelli	ITA 13	~~DNF~~	~~37~~	18	18	23	23	23	23	24	24	OCS	37	14	14	22	22	21	21	219	182
27	ITA	Giorgio Magri	Lino Locatelli; Daniele Piccinelli	ITA 231	18	18	22	22	~~33~~	~~33~~	31	31	22	22	22	22	26	26	24	24	19	19	217	184
28	HUN	Istvan Szucs	Gabor Gyulai; Peter Szucs	HUN 17	~~OCS~~	~~37~~	26	26	15	15	13	13	27	27	19	19	28	28	29	29	28	28	222	185
29	ITA	Claudio La Colombi	Danilo Ragni; Giusva Ragni	ITA 237	20	20	27	27	14	14	~~29~~	~~29~~	28	28	24	24	24	24	28	28	27	27	221	192
30	GER	Emil Kuchta	Susanne Kuchta; Andreas Hamacher	GER 243	27	27	29	29	29	29	26	26	20	20	~~33~~	~~33~~	22	22	16	16	30	30	232	199
31	ITA	Enrico Galbiati	Andrea Galbiati; Roberto Walter	ITA 239	29	29	~~33~~	~~33~~	26	26	32	32	25	25	17	17	31	31	20	20	22	22	235	202
32	FRA	Christian Jozan	Pierre Coudron de Coquereaumont; Thomas Jozan	FRA 137	33	33	25	25	28	28	27	27	~~32~~	~~32~~	29	29	30	30	18	18	29	29	251	218
33	ITA	Agostino Pizzetti	Santo Albieri; Marco Busetti	ITA 195	30	30	~~34~~	~~34~~	34	34	33	33	30	30	30	30	32	32	25	25	33	33	281	247
34	ITA	Angelo Zaina	Ubaldo Finzi; Alberto Motta	ITA 209	32	32	32	32	~~35~~	~~35~~	34	34	33	33	32	32	33	33	27	27	32	32	290	255
35	DEN	Lars Østergaard	Bjarne Nielsen; Martin Klein	DEN 104	28	28	28	28	31	31	35	35	31	31	~~OCS~~	~~37~~	34	34	31	31	DNS	37	292	255
36	ITA	Juri Ferri	Andrea De Gregorio; Mattia Zubboli	ITA 75	31	31	35	35	~~36~~	~~36~~	36	36	34	34	34	34	35	35	30	30	31	31	302	266

Legend: DNC – Did not come to the starting area; DNF – Did not finish; DNS – Did not start; DSQ – Disqualified;
Discard is crossed out and does not count for the overall result.

- 2009 Progress

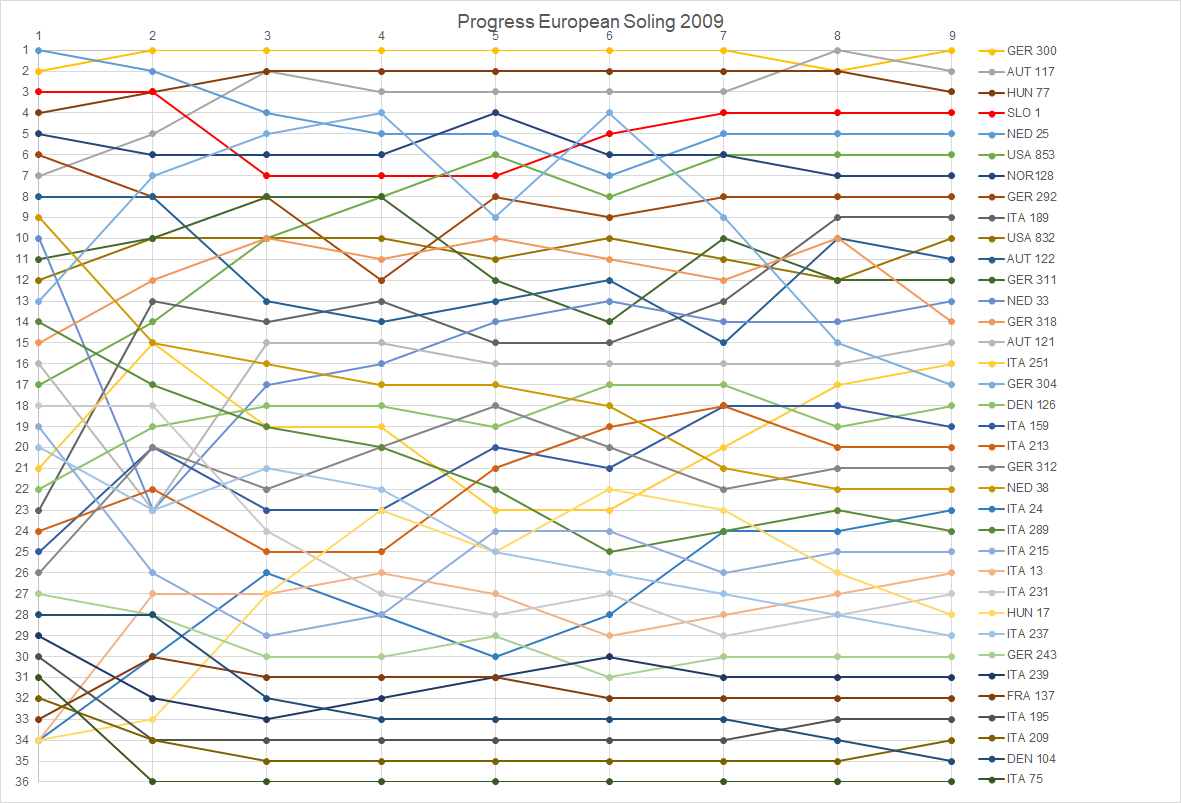

== Further results ==
For further results see:

- Soling European Championship results (1968–1979)
- Soling European Championship results (1980–1984)
- Soling European Championship results (1985–1989)
- Soling European Championship results (1990–1994)
- Soling European Championship results (1995–1999)
- Soling European Championship results (2000–2004)
- Soling European Championship results (2005–2009)
- Soling European Championship results (2010–2014)
- Soling European Championship results (2015–2019)
- Soling European Championship results (2020–2024)
