= List of Soling national champions =

All over the world, national Soling associations held since 1968 national championships. In some counties the winner of the event became the national champion even if the winning team came from a different country, like the Netherlands, Sweden or the United States. In other countries like Germany, Austria or Italy the champion is the first team from the organizing country even if they do not win the event. Since the Soling has always been an "open" class in that spirit we list in this overview the winners of the event. The first boat of the organizing country can be found in the references.

The Australian Soling Championship is recognized as a continental championship like the Europeans and the North and South Americans. Therefore the championships of New South Wales and Western Australia are listed. However Scotland is not a member of World Sailing they Nationals are listed any way since the event is listed under national championships in the Soling Guide of 1996–2000.

== National championships ==
=== Argentina ===
- 2002 – Martin Busch, Pablo Noceti, Ismael Ayerza
- 2003 – (Brazil) George Nehm, Marcos Ribeiro, Lúcio Ribeiro
- 2004 – Martin Busch, Pablo Noceti, Diego Weppler
- 2005 – Gustavo Warburg, Hernan Celedoni, Maximo Smith
- 2006 – Gustavo Warburg, Hernan Celedoni, Maximo Smith
- 2007 – Gustavo Warburg, Hernan Celedoni, Maximo Smith
- 2008 – Gustavo Warburg, Hernan Celedoni, Maximo Smith
- 2009 – Gustavo Warburg, Hernan Celedoni, Maximo Smith
- 2010 – Gustavo Warburg, Hernan Celedoni, Maximo Smith
- 2011 – Martin Busch, Eduardo Zimermann, Maximo Feldtmann
- 2012 – Marcelo Zeni, Pablo Despontine, Ezequiel Sasso
- 2013 – Martin Busch, Eduardo Zimermann, Maximo Feldtmann
- 2014 – Gustavo Warburg, Hernan Celedoni, Tomas Roldan
- 2015 – Martin Busch, Eduardo Zimermann, Maximo Feldtmann
- 2016 – Paulo Cosentino, Nicolas Goulu, Jorge Goulu
- 2017 – Alejandro Chometowski, Estanislao Chometowski, Marcelo Schildkneckt
- 2018 – Alejandro Chometowski, Estanislao Chometowski, Nicolas Chometowski
- 2019 – Gustavo Warburg, Hernan Celedoni, Matias Roldan

=== Austria ===
- 1971 – Uli Strohschneider
- 1972 – Harold Fereberger
- 1973 – Uli Strohschneider
- 1974 – Hubert Raudaschl
- 1976 – (Germany) Rudi Berchtold, Roman Koch, Maxl Koch
- 1977 – Carl Auteried Jr.
- 1978 – Uli Strohschneider
- 1979 – Carl Auteried Jr.
- 1980 – Uli Strohschneider – Hannes Blaschke, Andreas Blaschke
- 1981 – Michael Farthofer
- 1982 – Michael Farthofer
- 1983 – Michael Farthofer, Christian Holler, Richard Holler
- 1984 – Michael Farthofer
- 1985 – Uli Strohschneider, Hannes Blaschke, Anderas Blaschke
- 1986 – (Hungary) György Financzy, Andras Toronyi, Tibor Izsak
- 1987 – Michael Farthofer, Matheis, Ferstl
- 1988 – (United States) Stuart H. Walker, Phillips, Gagern
- 1989 – Carl Auteried Jr.
- 1990 – (East Germany) Schulze, Schell, Voigt
- 1991 – Michael Luschan, Georg Stadler, Steinkogler
- 1992 – Christian Spiessberger
- 1993 – Carl Auteried Jr.
- 1994 – Gustav Kuhn
- 1995 – Cristian Binder
- 1996 – Carl Auteried Jr.
- 2002 – Carl Auteried Jr., Martin Kendler, Thomas Beclin
- 2003 – Carl Auteried Jr., Martin Kendler, Thomas Jakobowitz
- 2004 – Carl Auteried Jr., Martin Kendler, Udo Moser
- 2005 – Carl Auteried Jr., Martin Kendler, Udo Moser
- 2006 – Carl Auteried Jr., Martin Kendler, Udo Moser
- 2007 – Carl Auteried Jr., Martin Kendler, Udo Moser
- 2008 – (Hungary) György Wossala, Károly Vezér, Pepe Németh
- 2009 – (Hungary) György Wossala, Károly Vezér, Pepe Németh
- 2010 – Carl Auteried Jr., Martin Kendler, Thomas Auteried
- 2011 – (Germany) Karl Haist, Irene Haist, Martin Zeileis (Austria)
- 2012 – (Germany) Heino Schuckmann, Dominik Meissner, Markus Stallhofer
- 2013 – (Hungary) György Wossala, Christoph Wossala, Pepe Német]
- 2014 – (Germany) Karl Heist, Irene Heist, Martin Zeileis (Austria)
- 2016 – (Ukraine) Igor Yushko, Serhiy Pichuhin, Igor Severianov
- 2017 – (Ukraine) Igor Yushko, Serhiy Pichuhin, Igor Severianov
- 2018 – (Hungary) Sandor Varjas, László Kovácsi, Kraut Balazs
- 2019 – (Germany) Karl Haist, Irene Haist, Martin Zeileis (Austria)
- 2022 – (Germany) Karl Haist, Irene Haist, Martin Zeileis (Austria)

=== Bermuda ===
- 1969 – Kirk Cooper
- 1970 – Kirk Cooper
- 1971 – Kirk Cooper
- 1972 – Kirk Cooper
- 1973 – Kirk Cooper
- 1974 – Kirk Cooper
- 1975 – Kirk Cooper
- 1977 – Alex Cooper
- 1978 – Alex Cooper
- 1979 – Alex Cooper
- 1980 – Alex Cooper
- 1981 – Alex Cooper
- 1982 – Alex Cooper
- 1983 – Alex Cooper

=== Brazil ===
- 1975 – Gastão Brun
- 1980 – Torben Grael, Ronaldo Senfft, Daniel Adler
- 1981 – Torben Grael, Ronaldo Senfft, Daniel Adler
- 1982 – Torben Grael, Ronaldo Senfft, Daniel Adler
- 1983 – Jose Paulo Dias, Jose Augusto Dias, Nelson Falcao
- 1984 – Eduardo de Souza, Ricardo Velerio, Robert Rittcher
- 1985 – Torben Grael, Ronaldo Senfft, Daniel Adler
- 1986 – Torben Grael, Ronaldo Senfft, Daniel Adler
- 1987 – Torben Grael, Ronaldo Senfft, Daniel Adler
- 1988 – Jose Paulo Dias, Daniel Adler, Jose Augusto Dias
- 1989 – Alan Adler, Daniel Adler, Ronaldo Senfft
- 1990 – Jose Paulo Dias, Daniel Adler, Jose Augusto Dias
- 1991 – Jorge Zarif, Ronaldo Senfft, Norman McPherson
- 1992 – Jose Paulo Dias, Daniel Adler, Jose Augusto Dias
- 1993 – Torben Grael, Ronaldo Senfft, Mesquite
- 1994 – Paes Lema, D'Elia, Norman McPherson
- 1995 – not held
- 1996 – Edson de Araújo Jr., Daniel Glomb, Marcelo Reitz
- 2002 – Renato Cunha, Abílio Di Gerardi, Sérgio Goretkin
- 2003 – George Nehm, Marcos Ribeiro, Lúcio Ribeiro
- 2004 – Lucas Ostergren, Adrion Santos, Mathias Melecchi
- 2005 – Renato Cunha, Ricardo Ermel, Eduardo Cunha
- 2006 – George Nehm, Marcos Ribeiro, Lúcio Ribeiro
- 2007 – André Wahrlich, André Gick, Fábio Pillar
- 2008 – Daniel Glomb, Marcos Ribeiro, Lúcio Ribeiro
- 2009 – Niels Rump, Frederico Sidou, Carlo De Leo
- 2010 – George Nehm, Marcos Ribeiro, Lúcio Ribeiro
- 2011 – Guilherme Roth, Marcos Ribeiro, Lúcio Ribeiro
- 2012 – Flavio Quevedo, Jonathan Heit Camara, Andre Renard
- 2013 – Nelson Horn Ilha, Paulo Ribeiro, Felipe Ilha
- 2014 – George Nehm, Marcos Ribeiro, Lúcio Ribeiro
- 2015 – Lucas Ostegreen, Carlos Trein, Roger Lamb
- 2016 – Nelson Horn Ilha, Manfredo Floricke, Gustavo Ilha
- 2017 – George Nehm, Marcos Ribeiro, Alexandre Mueller
- 2018 – George Nehm, Marcos Ribeiro, Alexandre Mueller
- 2019 – George Nehm, Marcos Ribeiro, Alexandre Mueller
- 2020 – Ciciero Hartmann, Ricardo Titoff, Andre Renard

=== Canada ===
- 1969 – John Dane III, Mark LeBlanc, John Cerise
- 1970 – (United States) Buddy Melges
- 1971 – (United States) Buddy Melges
- 1972 – not held
- 1973 – Hans Fogh
- 1974 – Buddy Melges
- 1975 – (Australia) David Forbes, John Anderson, Denis O'Neil
- 1976 – not held
- 1977 – Peter Hall
- 1978 – Hans Fogh
- 1979 – Peter Hall
- 1980 – (Brazil) Torben Grael, Daniel Adler, Ronaldo Senfft
- 1981 – Hans Fogh
- 1982 – Hans Fogh
- 1983 – (United States) Dave Chapin
- 1984 – Bill Abbott Jr.
- 1985 – Hans Fogh
- 1986 – Hans Fogh
- 1987 – not held
- 1988 – Bill Abbott Jr.
- 1989 – Paul Thomson, Stuart Flinn, Philip Gow
- 1990 – Jim Beatty
- 1991 – Paul Thomson, Stuart Flinn, Philip Gow
- 1992 – Bill Abbott Jr.
- 1993 – (United States) Jeff Madrigali
- 1994 – (United States) John Kolius
- 1995 – (South Africa) Bruce Savage
- 2002 – Rick Huczek, T. Rickards, David Hymers
- 2004 – Tom Mitchel, Eric MacKnight, Ken Davy
- 2005 – Rick Huczek, David Hymers, Will Logar
- 2006 – Hans Fogh, Roger Cheer, Gord Devries
- 2007 – Hans Fogh, Roger Cheer, Gord Devries
- 2008 – Hans Fogh, Roger Cheer, Ross Findlater
- 2009 – Hans Fogh, Roger Cheer, Gord Devries
- 2010 – Hans Fogh, Roger Cheer, Gord Devries
- 2011 – Bill Abbott Jr., Steve Lacey/Matt Abbott, Joanne Abbott
- 2012 – Hans Fogh, Roger Cheer, Gord Devries
- 2013 – Bill Abbott Jr., Matt Abbott, Scott Bamford
- 2014 – Thomas Fogh, Roger Cheer, Gord Devries
- 2015 – Peter Hall, William Hall, Steve Lacey
- 2016 – Thomas Fogh, Roger Cheer, Gord Devries
- 2017 – Peter Hall, Steve Lacey, Antoine Paccarar
- 2018 – Peter Hall, William Hall, Steve Lacey
- 2019 – Bruce Clifford, Matt Abbott, Nathaniel Abbott

=== Denmark ===
- 1972 – Paul Elvstrøm
- 1973 – Ib Ussing Andersen, Poul Richard Høj Jensen
- 1979 – Poul Richard Høj Jensen
- 1980 – Poul Richard Høj Jensen
- 1982 – Poul Richard Høj Jensen
- 1994 – Michael Hestbæk
- 1995 – not completed
- 1980 – Peter Kanpmann
- 2007 – (Norway) Preben Asbjørnrød, Richard Fikse, Hans Jørgen Husum
- 2008 – (Norway) Preben Asbjørnrød, Richard Fikse, Hans Jørgen Husum
- 2009 – (Norway) Preben Asbjørnrød, Richard Fikse, Hans Jørgen Husum
- 2010 – (Norway) Preben Asbjørnrød
- 2011 – Frank Lavrsen, Jakob Dyrholm, Carsten Moesgaard

=== Spain ===
- 1992 – C. Martinez
- 1993 – Luis Doreste
- 1994 – Luis Doreste
- 2008 – Arturo D. de Almeida, Jose Jesus Mendez, Gonzalez Luis Merino
- 2012 – Alfonso C. de Carvajal, Jose Luis Vina, Carlos Elosegui
- 2015 – Alfonso Colon, Jose Luis Vina, Alvaro Paya
- 2016 – Carlos Elósegui, Cuco Gómez, Juan Ramón Jiménez
- 2017 – Jaime Alonso Allende, Julio Soria, Tomas Peuvrel
- 2018 – Julio Soria, V. Soto, Tomas Peuvrel
- 2019 – Mikel Alvarez, Eliseo Belzunce, Guillermo Parodi

=== Finland ===
- 1979 – (Australia) John Bertrand
- 1994 – Johan Winquist
- 1995 – Eki Heinonen
- 1996 – Robert Ronnback

=== France ===
- 1979 – Bertrand Cheret
- 1988 – Pascot, Picard, Level
- 1989 – (Soviet Union) Tõnu Tõniste, Tauts, Poljakov
- 1994 – Yves Loday
- 1995 – Marc Bouet
- 1996 – Jean-Marie le Guillou

=== West Germany ===
- 1974 – Willi Kuhweide
- 1977 – Willi Kuhweide
- 1979 – (United Kingdom) Phil Crebbin
- 1980 – (Denmark) Poul Richard Høj Jensen, Valdemar Bandolowski, Erik Hansen
- 1981 – Willi Kuhweide
- 1982 – Erich Hirt Jr., Obermaier, Neuting
- 1983 – (Denmark) Jesper Bank, Thomas Andersen, Jan Mathiasen
- 1984 – Achim Kadelbach
- 1985 – Wolfgang Gerz
- 1986 – (Canada) Paul Thomson, Stuart Flinn, Philip Gow
- 1987 – Jens-Peter Wrede, Matthias Adamczewski, Stefan Knabe
- 1988 – not held
- 1989 – Axel Mertens
- 1990 – Hinz Schmid, König, König

=== Germany ===
- 1991 – Jochen Schümann, Thomas Flach, Bernd Jäkel
- 1992 – (Netherlands) Roy Heiner
- 1993 – Jorg Hermann
- 1994 – Albert Batzill, Peter Lang
- 1995 – Jochen Schümann, Thomas Flach, Bernd Jäkel
- 1996 – (Ukraine) Serhiy Pichuhin, Serhiy Khaindrava, Volodymyr Korotkov
- 2002 – Heiko Winkler, Stefan Wenzel, Jens Niemann
- 2003 – Heiko Winkler, Stefan Wenzel, H. Wenzel
- 2004 – Heiko Winkler, Stefan Wenzel, Jens Niemann
- 2005 – Holger Weigert, Laurent Scheel, Frank Feller
- 2006 – Roman Koch, Maxl Koch, Gregor Bornemann
- 2007 – Roman Koch, Maxl Koch, Gregor Bornemann
- 2008 – Roman Koch, Maxl Koch, Gregor Bornemann
- 2009 – Holger Weigert, Laurent Scheel, Martin Setzkorn
- 2010 – Karl Haist, Irene Haist, Johan Lindner
- 2011 – Karl Haist, Irene Haist, Martin Zeileis
- 2012 – Holger Weigert, Laurent Scheel, Martin Setzkorn
- 2013 – Uwe Steingroß, Karsten Eller, Tim Giesecke
- 2014 – Karl Haist, Irene Haist, Martin Zeileis
- 2015 – Karl Haist, Irene Haist, Martin Zeileis
- 2016 – Michael Dietzel, Martin Zeileis, Hannes Ramoser
- 2017 – Karl Haist, Irene Haist, Martin Zeileis
- 2018 – Karl Haist, Irene Haist, Martin Zeileis
- 2019 – (United States) Matias Collins, Andreas Baumüller (Germany) , Stefan Strauch (Germany)

=== Great Britain ===
- 1969 – Peter Cooke
- 1970 – John Oakeley
- 1971 – David Thomas
- 1972 – David Thomas
- 1973 – Kit Hobday
- 1974 – Charles Ingham
- 1975 – Charles Ingham
- 1976 – Ian MacDonald-Smith
- 1977 – Phil Crebbin
- 1978 – Colin Simonds
- 1979 – (France) Patrick Haegeli
- 1980 – Colin Simonds
- 1981 – Chris Law
- 1982 – Ted Ford
- 1983 – Graham Bailey
- 1984 – Chris Law
- 1987 – Glyn Charles, Andy Beadsworth, Robert Cruickshank
- 1988 – Boyd Baird
- 1989 – Rory Bowman, Tom Stevens, Mark Ingram
- 1990 – Rory Bowman, Mark Ingram, B. Nicholls
- 1991 – Glyn Charles
- 1992 – George Barker
- 1993 – George Baker
- 1994 – Stuart Childerley
- 1995 – David Ellis
- 2002 – Hamish Mackay
- 2003 – Mike Preston, Brian Bottomley, Ron Preston
- 2004 – Mike Preston, Brian Bottomley, Ron Preston
- 2005 – Mike Preston, Brian Bottomley, Ron Preston
- 2006 – Mike Preston, Brian Bottomley, Ron Preston
- 2007 – Derek Priestley, George Barker, Gary Adams
- 2008 – Chris Dodgshon, Liz Loudon, Stevie Corson
- 2009 – Mark Fisher, Andrew Freemantle, Josh Brown
- 2010 – Gary Richardson, Stewart Lee, Karl Sloane
- 2016 – Gary Richardson, Karl Sloane, Stewart Lee
- 2017 – Gary Richardson, Karl Sloane, Stewart Lee
- 2018 – Gary Richardson, Stewart Lee, Karl Gotts
- 2019 – Gary Richardson, Stuart Lee, Oliver Murray

=== Hungary ===
- 1985 – Szabolcs Detre, Zsolt Detre, Bakos
- 1986 – György Financzy, Andras Toronyi, Tibor Izsak
- 1987 – Miklós Tuss, Sandor David, Krisztian Sardu
- 1988 – Tamas Ori, Istvan Rujak, Bela Bankuti
- 1989 – Antal Szekely, Miklos Czermendy, Tamas Ori
- 1990 – Antal Szekely, Miklos Czermendy, Attila Hatyka Varga
- 1991 – Antal Szekely, Miklos Czermendy, Attila Hatyka Varga
- 1992 – Szabolcs Detre, Zsolt Detre, Pager
- 1993 – Szabolcs Detre, Zsolt Detre, Kis
- 1994 – Szabolcs Detre, Zsolt Detre, Gyula Nyari
- 1995 – Szabolcs Detre, Zsolt Detre, László Szabó
- 2002 – (Ukraine) Serhiy Pichuhin, Serhiy Timokhov, Dimitro Yarovoy
- 2003 – (Ukraine) Serhiy Pichuhin, Serhiy Timokhov Timokhov, Dimitro Yarovoy
- 2004 – (Germany) Roman Koch, Maxl Koch, Christoph Wossala (Hungary)
- 2005 – Balazs Gyenese, Gyula Monus, Károly Vezér
- 2007 – György Wossala, Károly Vezér, Pepe Németh
- 2008 – György Wossala, Károly Vezér, Pepe Németh
- 2009 – György Wossala, Károly Vezér, Pepe Németh
- 2010 – György Wossala, Károly Vezér, Pepe Németh
- 2011 – György Wossala, Károly Vezér, Pepe Németh
- 2012 – György Wossala, Károly Vezér, Pepe Németh
- 2013 – Farkas Litkey, Károly Vezér, Csaba Weinhard

=== Italy ===
- 1969 – Cosentino, Capri, Napoleone
- 1970 – Coccoloni, Cecconi, Patrone
- 1971 – Giuseppe Milone, Gargano, Antonio Oliviero
- 1972 – Coccoloni, Trani, Tadini
- 1973 – Fabio Albarelli, Leopoldo Di Martino, Guidotti
- 1974 – Fabio Albarelli, Leopoldo Di Martino, Guidotti
- 1975 – Scala, Bonvicini, Petrocchi
- 1976 – Orlandi, Randazzo, Niederbrucker
- 1977 – Vittorio Porta, Scaramucci, Zanasi
- 1978 – Giampiero Dotti, Ghirlandi, Basso
- 1979 – (West Germany) Erich Hirt
- 1980 – Giuseppe Milone, Roberto Mottola di Amato, Klinkerberger
- 1981 – Giuseppe Bolens, Ernesto Bolens, Guidotti
- 1982 – Giuseppe Milone, Roberto Mottola di Amato, Klinkenborg
- 1983 – Gianluca Lamaro, Valerio Romano, Aurelio Dalla Vecchia
- 1984 – Marino, Cristaldini, Bottini
- 1985 – Flavio Favini, Di Natale, Passoni
- 1986 – Flavio Favini, Di Natale, Passoni
- 1987 – Flavio Favini, Di Natale, Passoni
- 1988 – Ciferri, Giusti, Anastasio
- 1989 – Flavio Favini, Di Natale, Passoni
- 1990 – Flavio Favini, Di Natale, Passoni
- 1991 – Flavio Favini, Di Natale, Passoni
- 1992 – Flavio Favini, Di Natale, Passoni
- 1993 – Santella
- 1994 – P. Fornelli, Bortoletto, Di Capua
- 1995 – not completed
- 1997 – Mario Celon, Nicola Celon, Sommariva
- 1998 – Cian, Colaninno, Fornelli
- 1999 – Tommaso Chieffi, Grassi, Viale
- 2001 – G. Tognozzi., Donati, Galli
- 2002 – Bruno Maffezzoli, Marco Maffezzoli, Pierfrancesco Maffezzoli
- 2003 – (Germany) Roman Koch, Maxl Koch, Weiland
- 2004 – (Germany) Roman Koch, Maxl Koch, Christof Wossala (Hungary)
- 2005 – (Germany) Marquardt, Cook, Heino Shuckmann
- 2006 – (Germany) Roman Koch, Maxl Koch, Gregor Bornemann
- 2007 – (Germany) Roman Koch, Maxl Koch, Gregor Bornemann
- 2008 – (Hungary) György Wossala, Károly Vezér, László Kovácsi
- 2009 – (Germany) Roman Koch, Maxl Koch, Gregor Bornemann
- 2010 – (Netherlands) Rudy den Outer, Gavin Lidlow, Leo Determan
- 2011 – (Germany) Jörg Herrmann, Eller Karsten, Tim Giesecke
- 2012 – (Austria) Ludwig Beurle, Christian Beurle, Hermann Beurle
- 2013 – (Hungary) György Wossala, Károly Vezér, Christof Wossala
- 2014 – (Germany) Roman Koch, Maxl Koch, Gregor Bornemann
- 2015 – (Canada) Peter Hall, William Hall, Stave Lacey
- 2016 – (Ukraine) Igor Yushko, Serhiy Pichuhin, Igor Severianov
- 2017 – (Ukraine) Igor Yushko, Serhiy Pichuhin, Igor Severianov
- 2018 – (Ukraine) Igor Yushko, Serhiy Pichuhin, Oleksly Kuril
- 2019 – (Ukraine) Igor Yushko, Serhiy Pichuhin, Sergey Ivansits
- 2020 – COVID-19
- 2021 – COVID-19
- 2022 – (Netherlands) Rudy den Outer, Theo de Lange, Bram Soethoudt

=== Japan ===
- 1972 – Maeda, Shiomi, Arakawa
- 1973 – Maeda, Shiomi, Arakawa
- 1974 – Kaido, Otani, Shibata
- 1975 – Kaido, Otani, Shibata
- 1976 – Tsuneo Sanada, Yamada, Maeda
- 1977 – (United States) Manfred Rocker
- 1978 – Tsuneo Sanada, Yamada, Maeda
- 1979 – Ishibashi, Jiyojima, Komiya
- 1980 – Hidaka, Kazuo Hanaoka, Tadashi Ikeda
- 1981 – Hidaka, Kazuo Hanaoka, Tadashi Ikeda
- 1982 – Takaharu Hirozawa, Minoru Okita, Takumi Fujiwara
- 1983 – Takaharu Hirozawa, Minoru Okita, Takumi Fujiwara
- 1984 – Aoyama, Yoshida, Tsuda
- 1985 – Aoyama, Hanaoka, Tsuda
- 1986 – Kazunori Komatsu, Hideaki Takashiro, Takumi Fujiwara
- 1987 – Takashima
- 1988 – Takashima
- 1989 – Mizukami
- 1990 – Kazunori Komatsu, Hideaki Takashiro, Takumi Fujiwara
- 1991 – Sato, Takumi Fujiwara, Takagi
- 1992 – Mizukami, Takumi – Yasuharu Fujiwara, Takei
- 1993 – Takashima, Sato, Yamanaka
- 1994 – Kazunori Komatsu, Shimizu, Sanada
- 1995 – T. Sakaue, Ikematsu, Togashi
- 2003 – Yamanaka, Ito, Watanabe
- 2004 – Yamanaka, Ito, Watanabe
- 2005 – T. Sakaue, H. Kawazoe, M. Takahashi
- 2006 – Yamanaka, Watanabe, Yasuharu Fujiwara
- 2007 – Satake, Tanjo, Masuda
- 2008 – T. Sakaue, Takagi, H. Kawazoe
- 2010 – T. Sakaue, Yasuharu Fujiwara, M. Takahashi
- 2011 – T. Sakaue, H. Kawazoe, M. Takahashi
- 2013 – M. Satake, M. Nakamura, T. Tanjyou
- 2016 – T. Sakaue, M. Kiuchi, H. Kawazoe
- 2018 – T. Sakaue, M. Kiuchi, H. Kawazoe

=== Netherlands ===
- 1971 – Arie Klein, Steven Bakker, J. Schäfer
- 1972 – Geert Bakker, Jan-Bart Lucas, Feico Bakker
- 1973 – (East Germany) Dieter Below, Olaf Engelhardt, Michael Zachries
- 1974 – Heiki Blok, Kobus Vandenberg, Rolf Kurpershoek
- 1975 – not held
- 1976 – not held
- 1977 – not held
- 1978 – Geert Bakker
- 1979 – (United Kingdom) Collin Simonds
- 1980 – (Denmark) Peter Kanpmann
- 1981 – Geert Bakker, Dick Coster, Max Behrend
- 1982 – (Denmark) Valdemar Bandolowski, Theis Palm, Erik Hansen
- 1983 – (West Germany) Willy Kuhweide
- 1986 – (West Germany) Thomas Jungblut
- 1987 – (West Germany) Thomas Jungblut, Thomas Maschkiwitz, Kroger
- 1988 – (Italy) Gianluca Lamaro, Aurelio Dalla Vecchia, Valerio Romano
- 1989 – Roy Heiner, Jip Pen, Harrald Snater
- 1990 – Roy Heiner
- 1991 – Maarten Kimman, Niels Unger,
- 1992 – Rudy den Outer, Philip Ruys, Sverre Samdahl (Norway)
- 1993 – Willem Potma, Gerhard Potma, Frank Hettinga
- 1994 – Willem Potma, Gerhard Potma, Frank Hettinga
- 1995 – Rudy den Outer, Jaap de Zeeuw, Leo Determan
- 1998 – Rudy den Outer, Johan Offermans, Ronald den Arend
- 1999 – Rudy den Outer, Leo Determan, Ronald den Arend
- 2000 – Rudy den Outer, Theo de Lange, Leo Determan
- 2002 – Johan Offermans, Nancy Schoof, Edgar Copper
- 2003 – (United States) Stuart H. Walker, Chris Brown, Hans Zijlstra (Netherlands)
- 2008 – Rudy den Outer, Leo Determan, Ronald den Arend
- 2011 – Rudy den Outer, Gavin Lidlow, Leo Determan
- 2012 – Rudy den Outer, Gavin Lidlow, Dominik Bakker
- 2013 – Johan Offermans, Wick Hillige, Niels van Braam
- 2014 – Rudy den Outer, Gavin Lidlow, Ramzi Souli
- 2015 – Rudy den Outer, Gavin Lidlow, Ramzi Souli
- 2016 – Rudy den Outer, Theo de Lange, Ramzi Souli
- 2017 – (Finland) Eki Heinonen, Gabor Helmhout (Netherlands) , Jenny van der Werf (Netherlands)
- 2018 – (Finland) Eki Heinonen, Pasi Palmu, Gabor Helmhout (Netherlands)
- 2019 – Rudy den Outer, Theo de Lange, Thies Bosch
- 2020 – COVID-19
- 2021 – Rudy den Outer, Theo de Lange, Ramzi Souli
- 2022 – Rudy den Outer, Pauck Knabe, Ramzi Souli/Rik Dieperink
- 2023 – Rudy den Outer, Pauck Knabe/Theo de Lange, Ramzi Souli

=== Norway ===
- 1974 – HRH Prince Harald
- 1976 – Per Spilling
- 1977 – HRH Prince Harald
- 1978 – HRH Prince Harald
- 1979 – Hans Wang
- 1980 – Hans Wang
- 1981 – Hans Wang
- 1982 – Hans Wang
- 1983 – Terje Wang
- 1984 – Kalle Nergaard
- 1985 – Terje Wang, Jorn Pettersen, Tom Selander
- 1986 – Terje Wang
- 1987 – Terje Wang
- 1988 – Terje Wang, Erling Landsværk, Jørn Petterson
- 1989 – (East Germany) Helmar Nauck, Norbert Hellreigel, Sven Diedering
- 1990 – Rune Jacobson, Thom Haaland, Erling Landsværk
- 1991 – Rune Jacobson, Thom Haaland, M. Andersen
- 1992 – Terje Wang
- 1993 – Rune Jacobson, Thom Haaland, Erling Landsværk
- 1994 – Herman Horn Johannessen, Paul Davis, Espen Stokkeland
- 1995 – P. Skaart
- 2003 – Ole Schøyen, Kjell Magdahl, Henrich Henriksen
- 2005 – Alexander Andersen, Ottestad Arne, Goldeng Eskil
- 2006 – (Germany) Roman Koch, Georgios Nikoltsis (Norway) , Vidar Tregde (Norway)
- 2007 – (Germany) Roman Koch, Maxl Koch, Gregor Bornemann
- 2008 – Preben Asbjørnrød, Richard Fikse, Hans Jørgen Husum
- 2010 – (Denmark) Frank Lavrsen, Jacob Andersen, Mogens Jørgensen
- 2013 – Lars Ingeberg, Frode Kirkedam, Alf Larsen
- 2014 – Halvor Schoyen, Reidar Sårheim, Truls Rummelhoff
- 2015 – Halvor Shoyen, Reidar Sårheim, Peer Pihl
- 2017 – Pal Kristiansen
- 2018 – Pal Kristiansen

=== New Zealand ===
- 1975 – Hugh Poole
- 1978 – Hugh Poole
- 1980 – Ralph Roberts, Chris Urry, Richard Gladwell
- 1982 – Tom Dodson

=== Soviet Union ===
- 1978 – Ilya Mikhallov

=== Sweden ===
- 1969 – Stig Wennerstrom
- 1970 – Stig Wennerström
- 1971 – Arved von Gruenewaldt
- 1972 – Arved von Gruenewaldt
- 1973 – Stig Wennerström
- 1974 – Jörgen Sundelin, Ulf Sundelin, Peter Sundelin
- 1975 – Stig Wennerström
- 1977 – Arved von Gruenewaldt
- 1978 – Arved von Gruenewaldt
- 1979 – Arved von Gruenewaldt
- 1981 – Erik Thorsell
- 1982 – (Denmark) Valdemar Bandolowski
- 1993 – (Denmark) Jesper Bank, Jan Mathiasen, Steen Secher
- 1984 – (East Germany) Helmar Nauck, Norbert Hellriegel, Sven Diedering
- 1985 – (East Germany) Jochen Schümann, Thomas Flach, Bernd Jäkel
- 1986 – (Denmark) Jesper Bank, Jan Mathiasen, Steen Secher
- 1987 – (United States) Brodie Cobb, Hopkins, Mark LeBlanc
- 1988 – (East Germany) Jochen Schümann, Thomas Flach, Bernd Jäkel
- 1989 – (East Germany) Helmar Nauck, Norbert Hellriegel, Sven Diedering
- 1990 – (East Germany) Jochen Schümann, Thomas Flach, Bernd Jäkel
- 1991 – Martin Pålsson, Alm, Idmyr
- 1992 – Magnus Holmberg
- 1993 – not held
- 1994 – not held
- 1995 – Johansson, Stromblad, Holm
- 2007 – (Norway) Preben Asbjørnrød, Richard Fikse, Hans Jørgen Husum
- 2008 – Peder Thunander, Eric Thunander, Sören Mann
- 2009 – (Norway) Preben Asbjørnrød, Richard Fikse, Hans Jørgen Husum
- 2010 – (Denmark) Frank H Lavrsen
- 2011 – (Canada) Peter Hall
- 2012 – Calle Schön, Erik Evers, David Rådström

=== Switzerland ===
- 1974 – Bernet
- 1975 – J. Christen
- 1976 – U. Colombi
- 1977 – (Netherlands) Heiki Blok
- 1978 – R. Fragniere, A. Lanz, Gr. Perrin
- 1979 – M. M. Corminboeuf, Perret, Guignard
- 1980 – (Netherlands) Heiki Blok
- 1981 – Fredy Schurch, Zurfluh, Vetter
- 1982 – Alain Testuz, L. Chapuis, F. Charpie
- 1983 – Alain Testus, L. Chapuis, F. Charpie
- 1984 – Roger Guignard
- 1985 – Jan Rosset, Dubois, Perroud
- 1986 – R. Gregorini, S. Rathgeb, M. Brechtbühler
- 1987 – (United States) Stuart H. Walker, Dunn, Nikki Seemann (Liechtenstein)
- 1988 – Diday, Grimm, Buriquet
- 1989 – Stuart H. Walker
- 1990 – D. Schenker, C Schenker, C. Owen
- 1991 – Jorg Menzi, Christen, Fumasoli
- 1992 – Jorg Menzi, Christen, Fumasoli
- 1993 – Jorg Menzi, Christen, Fumasoli
- 1994 – Jorg Menzi, Christen, Fumasoli
- 1995 – not held

=== United States ===
- 1971 – John Dane III, Mark LeBlanc, John Cerise
- 1972 – Bruce Goldsmith
- 1973 – (Canada) Hans Fogh
- 1974 – Buddy Melges
- 1975 – John Kolius
- 1976 – Buddy Melges
- 1977 – Dave Curtis
- 1978 – Dave Curtis
- 1979 – Robbie Haines
- 1980 – Ed Baird
- 1981 – (Canada) Hans Fogh
- 1982 – (Canada) Hans Fogh
- 1983 – Dave Curtis
- 1984 – Robbie Haines
- 1985 – (Canada) Hans Fogh
- 1986 – (Canada) Hans Fogh
- 1987 – John Kostecki
- 1988 – John Kostecki
- 1989 – (Canada) Bill Abbott Jr., Matt Abbott, Don Beatty
- 1990 – (Canada) Hans Fogh
- 1991 – Kevin Mahaney
- 1992 – Kevin Mahaney
- 1993 – not completed
- 1994 – Larry Klein
- 1995 – Jeff Madrigali
- 1996 – Jeff Madrigali
- 2001 – Joe Hoeksema, Michael E. Wolf, Rose Hoeksema
- 2002 – Don Cohan, Buttner, Gladchin
- 2003 – Stuart H. Walker
- 2004 – Ian Wareham, Andrew Vance, Angus Brackett
- 2005 – Peter Galloway, Paul Steinborn, Greg Anthony
- 2006 – (Canada) Peter Hall, Philip Karrigan, Jay Deacon
- 2007 – (Canada) Peter Hall, Trevor Parekh, Mark Parsons
- 2008 – (Canada) Hans Fogh, Roger Cheer, Ross Findlater
- 2010 – (Canada) Hans Fogh, John Fich, Gord DeVries
- 2011 – Peter Gallaway, Ched Proctor, James Ewing
- 2012 – (Canada) Hans Fogh, John Fich, Gord DeVries
- 2013 – (Canada) Peter Hall, Steve Lacey, William Hall
- 2014 – (Canada) Peter Hall, Mike Parsons, William Hall
- 2015 – (Canada) Peter Hall, Steve Lacey, William Hall
- 2016 – (Canada) Peter Hall, Steve Lacey, William Hall
- 2017 – (Germany) Michael Dietzel, Martin Zeileis, Hannes Ramoser
- 2018 – (Canada) Peter Hall, Steve Lacey, William Hall
- 2019 – (Canada) Peter Hall, Scott McNeil, William Hall

=== Uruguay ===
- 1985 – Carlos Rico, Alex Cerrato, Jorge Jaunsolo
- 1987 – Gustano Rana, Sebastian Rana, Leandro Filippelli

=== New South Wales ===
- 1969 – D. C. Brockhoff, H. Souuton
- 1970 – Malcolm Anderson
- 1971 – A. Osborne
- 1972 – Robert Miller, Ken Berkeley
- 1973 – M. F. Fletcher, J. D. Kahlbetzer
- 1974 – David Forbes, John Anderson, Denis O'Neil
- 1975 – David Forbes, John Anderson, Denis O'Neil
- 1976 – Malcolm Anderson
- 1977 – Mark Bethwaite, Bob Terrett
- 1978 – Phillip Susans, Karl Peipman
- 1979 – John Bertrand, Tim Dorning, Mark Fisher
- 1980 – John Bertrand, Tim Dorning, Gary Sheard
- 1981 – Mark Bethwaite, Bon Terrett, Peter Alexander
- 1983 – Mark Bethwaite, Bon Terrett, Ian MacDiarmid
- 1984 – Mark Bethwaite, Ian MacDiarmid, Glenn Reid
- 1985 – Peter Alexander, David Lynn, Warwick Anderson
- 1986 – Cameron Miles, Grant Ctowle, Mike String
- 1987 – James Wilmot, Stephan Gosling, Jeremy Whitty
- 1988 – Bobby Wilmot, Mathew Percy, Glenn Reid
- 1989 – James Wilmot, Paul Gloslig, Brett Jones
- 1990 – Neville Wittey, J. Mayo, S. Ellis
- 1994 – Stephan White, David Edwards, Josh Grace
- 1995 – Ivan Fitz-Gerald, Wayne Kenny, Glenn Kenny
- 1996 – Ivan Fitz-Gerald, Wayne Kenny, Glenn Kenny

=== Scotland ===
- 1989 – Boyd Baird
- 1990 – Boyd Baird, Broadhurst, Brown
- 1991 – Boyd Baird
- 1992 – Boyd Baird
- 1993 – Hamish Mackay
- 1994 – Hamish Loudon
- 1995 – Hamish Loudon
- 1996 – Hamish Mackay
- 2003 – Hamish Loudon, Bas Fountain
- 2004 – Gary Richardson, Carl Sloane and, Stewart Lee
- 2005 – Mike Preston, Bryan Bottlomey, Ron Preston
- 2006 – Chris Dodgshon
- 2007 – (United States) Stuart H. Walker, Derek Priestley (United Kingdom) , Gary Adams (United Kingdom)

=== Western Australia ===
- 1970 – David Melson
- 1971 – Noel Robins
- 1972 – Noel Robins
- 1973 – Michael Ahern
- 1974 – Noel Robins
- 1975 – Noel Robins
- 1976 – Noel Robins
- 1977 – Syd Lodge
- 1978 – Noel Robins
- 1979 – Syd Corser, John Spencer, Mark Kelt
- 1980 – Michael Ahern, Peter Gilmour, Tim Cocks
- 1981 – Tony Manford
- 1982 – Willy Packer
- 1983 – Peter Gilmour
- 1984 – Peter Gilmour
- 1985 – Peter Gilmour
- 1986 – Murray Smith
- 1987 – Barry Waller
- 1988 – Murray Smith
- 1989 – Murray Smith
- 1990 – Murray Smith
- 1991 – Murray Smith
- 1992 – Graham Bulford
- 1993 – Stuart Campbell
- 1994 – Michael Manford
- 1995 – Brett Riddle
- 1996 – Chris Pratt
- 2009 – Dave Limpus, Graham Romyn, Steve Elliot
- 2010 – Phil Smith, Brenton Edwards, Andrew Gage
- 2013 – Housego, Worth, Dunn
