= Ronald den Arend =

Dutch sailor (born 1972)

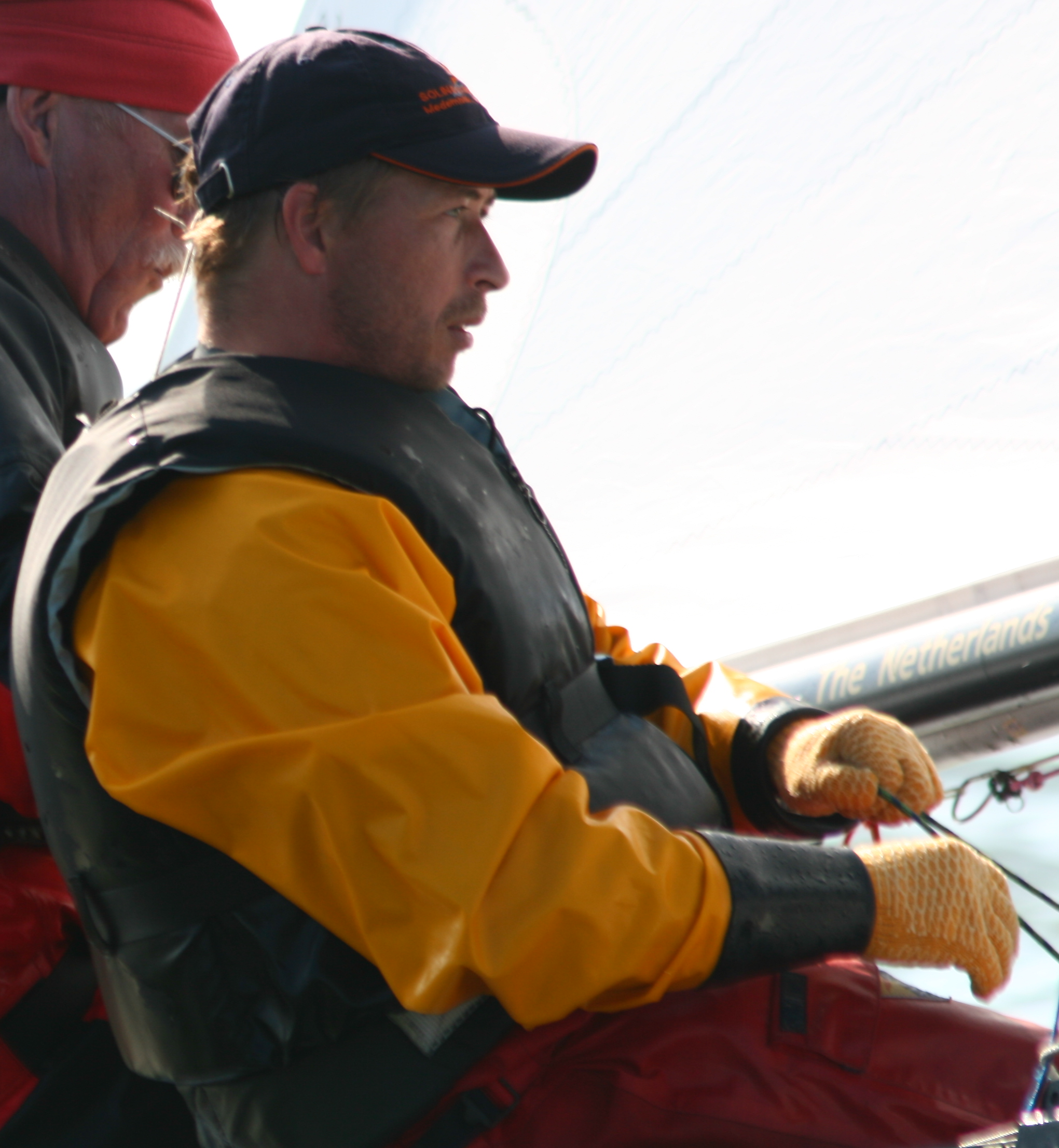
- Ronald den Arend during the 2008 Vintage Yachting Games

Personal information
- Full name: Ronald den Arend
- Nickname: Ro
- Nationality: Netherlands
- Born: May 14, 1972 (age 54) Rotterdam
- Height: 1.76 m (5.8 ft)

Sailing career
- Sport: Sailing
- Club: Kralingsche Zeil Club
- Class(es): Optimist, Laser, O-Jolle, Soling
Medal record
Representing Netherlands
Vintage Yachting Games
Gold medal – first place	2008 Medemblik, The Netherlands	Soling
- Updated on 11 May 2020

Ronald den Arend (born 14 May 1972 in Rotterdam) is a sailor from the Netherlands, who represented his country at the 2008 Vintage Yachting Games in Medemblik, The Netherlands. Den Arend on the foredeck, together with helmsman Rudy den Outer and Leo Determan in the middle, took the Gold medal in the Soling. Ronald holds several Dutch titles in the Soling. He is a member of the Kralingsche Zeil Club in Rotterdam.

== Personal life ==
Den Arend and his family live in the Rotterdam area, where he works as chief information officer and chief information security officer for the SWKGroep in Berkel en Rodenrijs.
