= Karl Haist =

German sailor (born 1938)

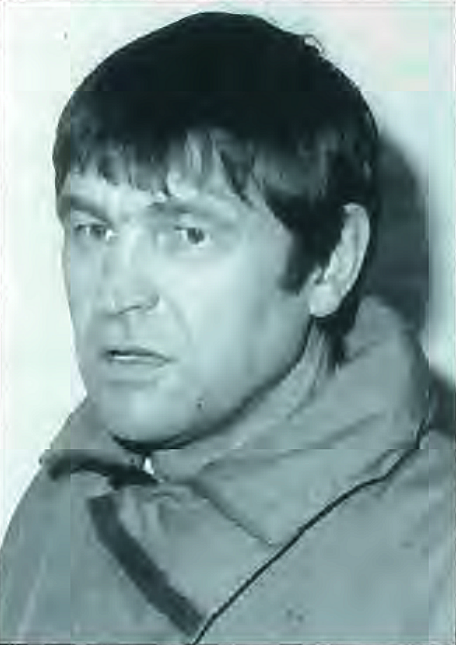

Personal information
- Nickname: Burschi
- Nationality: Germany
- Born: April 22, 1938 (age 88) Munich
- Height: 1.80 m (5.9 ft)

Sailing career
- Sport: Sailing
- Club: Bayerischer Yacht-Club
- Class: Soling
Medal record
Representing Germany
Soling Master Worlds Championship
Gold medal – first place	2014	Soling
European Championship
Silver medal – second place	2012 Aarhus, Denmark	Soling
Austrian Championships
Gold medal – first place	2011	Soling
Gold medal – first place	2014	Soling
Gold medal – first place	2019	Soling
German Championships
Gold medal – first place	2010	Soling
Gold medal – first place	2011	Soling
Gold medal – first place	2014	Soling
Gold medal – first place	2015	Soling
Gold medal – first place	2017	Soling
Gold medal – first place	2018	Soling
Gold medal – first place	2021	Soling
Italian Championships
Silver medal – second place	2016	Soling
Silver medal – second place	2018	Soling
Bronze medal – third place	2017	Soling
- Updated on 27 February 2022

Karl Haist (born 22 April 1938) is a German sailor. Together with Martin Zeileis (midperson) and Patrick Wichmann (foredeck), Haist won, as helmsman, second place during the 2012 European Soling Championship. With this team he became the Best Europeans in this series. Furthermore, Haist won the Soling World Trophy in 2011.

== Sailing career ==
Karl Haist has a long sailing career acting as helmsman since the mid 1950's in the Flying Dutchman and Soling. He is specialized in regatta's on lakes and in light air conditions. Karl holds several national Soling titles in Austria, Germany and Hungary and achieved many victories in European regatta's like the Omega Cup (GER), Erich Hirt Pokal (GER), Alpen Cup and the Trofeo Dino Schiesaro (ITA). Haist is Ehrenmitglied of the Bayerischer Yacht-Club and life member of the International Soling Association.

== Sailing management ==
From 1983 till 1986 Karl was President of the International Soling Association. Karl Haist had two major objectives for his presidency: First he wanted a large Soling event in Eastern Europe. He succeeded in this by having the 1985 Soling European Championship held in Balatonfüred, Hungary and the 1986 Europeans in Warnemünde, East Germany. The second objective, bringing the operational cost of the Soling down by reducing the number of sails during a championship, took more time. This rule was effectuated in March 1989. This rule change reduced the number of mainsails from 2 to 1 and the number of large spinnakers also back from 2 to 1.

== Professional career ==
Haist is retired as Diplom-Ingenieur in the Munich area.

Sporting positions
Preceded by (Germany) Ken Berkeley	President International Soling Association; 1983 – 1986	Succeeded by (United States) Sam Merrick
