= Giampiero Dotti =

Italian yacht racer (born 1951)

Giampiero Dotti (born 9 January 1951) is an Italian yacht racer who competed in the 1972 Summer Olympics.
