= Roman Koch =

German sailor

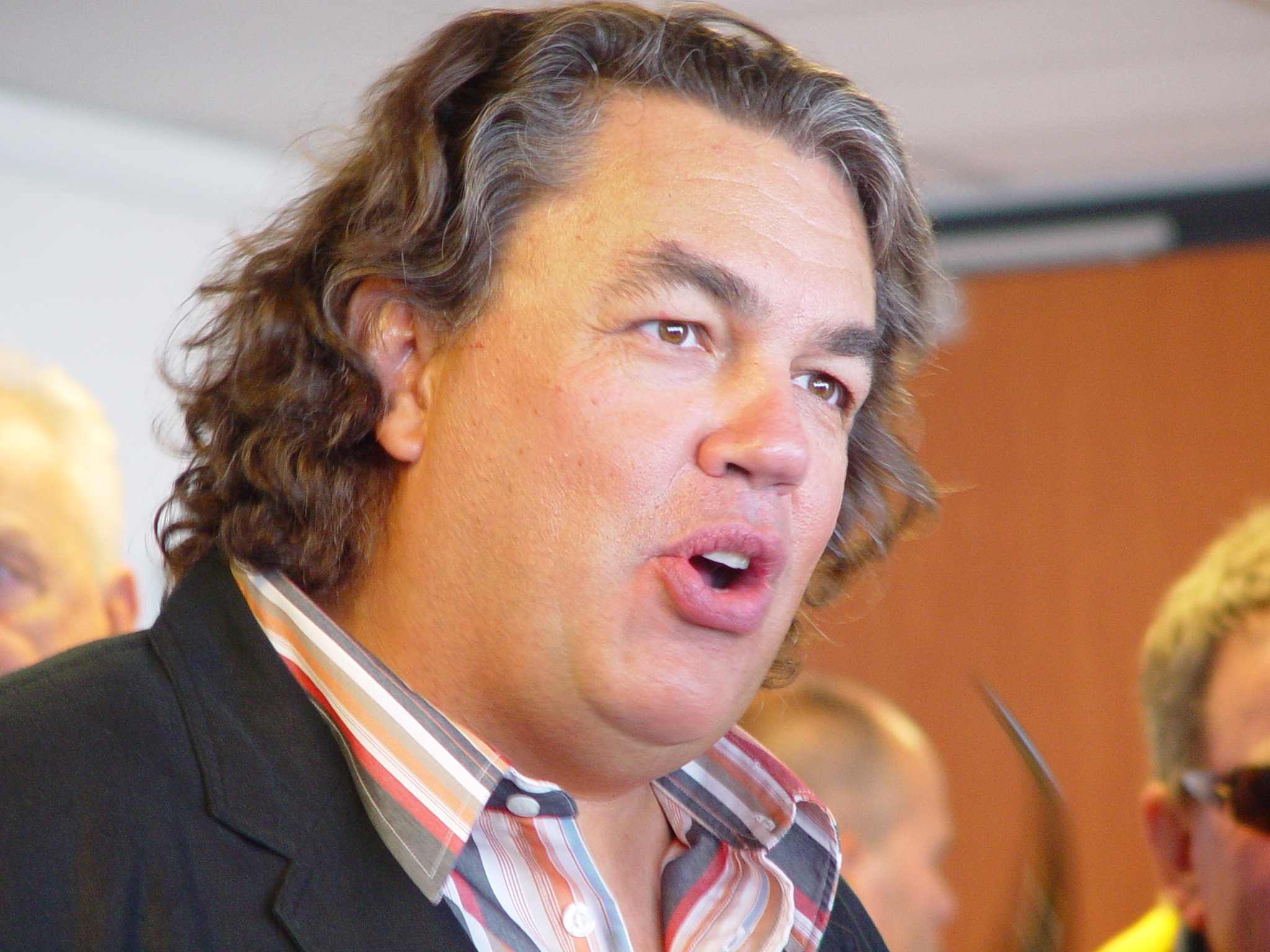
- Roman Koch during Europeans Soling in Medemblik 2005

Personal information
- Full name: Roman Paul Alois Koch
- Nickname: Maremma boy
- Nationality: Germany
- Born: 4 February 1958 (age 68) Munich, West Germany
- Height: 1.93 m (6 ft 4 in)

Sailing career
- Sport: Sailing
- Club: Chiemsee Yacht Club
- Class(es): Flying Dutchman, Soling, Dragon
Medal record
Representing Germany
World Championship
Gold medal – first place	2005 Castiglione della Pescaia, Italy	Soling
Gold medal – first place	2010 Porto Alegre, Brazil	Soling
Silver medal – second place	2009 Etobicoke, Canada	Soling
Soling World Master Championship
Silver medal – second place	2014	Soling
European Championship
Gold medal – first place	2005 Medemblik, Netherlands	Soling
Gold medal – first place	2009 Lovere, Italy	Soling
Silver medal – second place	2003 Torbole, Italy	Soling
Silver medal – second place	2006 Balatonfüred, Hungary	Soling
Silver medal – second place	2008 Balatonfüred, Hungary	Soling
Silver medal – second place	2010 La Trinité-sur-Mer, France	Soling
Silver medal – second place	2013 Castiglione della Pescaia, Italy	Soling
Austrian Championships AUT
Gold medal – first place	1995	Soling
Silver medal – second place	1996	Soling
Silver medal – second place	1999	Soling
Silver medal – second place	2002	Soling
Silver medal – second place	2008	Soling
Bronze medal – third place	1981	Soling
Bronze medal – third place	1982	Soling
Bronze medal – third place	2003	Soling
Bronze medal – third place	2010	Soling
Bronze medal – third place	2017	Soling
Canadian Championships CAN
Silver medal – second place	2013	Soling
Czech Republic Championships CZE
Gold medal – first place	1997	Soling
Spanish Championships ESP
Gold medal – first place	2018	Soling
Silver medal – second place	2012	Soling
French Championships FRA
Silver medal – second place	2018	Soling
West-German Championships FRG
Silver medal – second place	1981	Soling
Great Britain GBR
Bronze medal – third place	2006	Soling
German Championships GER
Gold medal – first place	2006	Soling
Gold medal – first place	2007	Soling
Gold medal – first place	2008	Soling
Silver medal – second place	2009	Soling
Bronze medal – third place	1990	Soling
Bronze medal – third place	2010	Soling
Bronze medal – third place	2013	Soling
Hungarian Championship HUN
Gold medal – first place	2004	Soling
Silver medal – second place	2010	Soling
Bronze medal – third place	2017	Soling
Italian Championship ITA
Gold medal – first place	2002	Soling
Gold medal – first place	2003	Soling
Gold medal – first place	2004	Soling
Gold medal – first place	2006	Soling
Gold medal – first place	2007	Soling
Gold medal – first place	2009	Soling
Gold medal – first place	2014	Soling
Silver medal – second place	1989	Soling
Silver medal – second place	2015	Soling
Silver medal – second place	2016	Soling
Silver medal – second place	2017	Soling
Silver medal – second place	2018	Soling
Dutch Championship NED
Bronze medal – third place	1982	Soling
Norwegian Championship NOR
Gold medal – first place	2006	Soling
Gold medal – first place	2007	Soling
- Updated on 15 Februari 2022

Roman Paul Alois Koch (born 4 February 1958) is a German sailor. As helmsman, he became twice World Champion in the Soling together with his teammates Maxl Koch and Gregor Bornemann.

== Sailing life ==
Koch switched, with his brother Maxl Koch, after a good run in the Flying Dutchman in 1977 to the Soling. Koch as helmsmen won his first Soling World Championship 20–27 May 2005 of the Tyrrhenian Sea in front of Castiglione della Pescaia, Italy with Maxl Koch and Gregor Bornemann. The second time took place five years later 5–13 February on the Guaiba river off the coast of Porto Alegre, Brazil. After the Championship in Castellione the Koch team earned the nickname "The Maremma boys". In 2009 the Koch team took the silver at the Soling Worlds in Etobicoke, Canada. Furthermore, Koch won two gold and five silver medals at Soling European Championships between 2003 and 2013 all as helmsman and with the same team members. Koch holds many national Championships in several countries.

=== Awards ===
- Bearer of the "Golden Badge of Honor" from the Bavarian Sailing Federation 1995, 2005–2011
- Bearer of the "Letter of Honor" from the City of Starnberg 2008–2011
- Bearer of the "Deed of Honor" from the City of Berlin 2006, 2008–2010
- "Sailor of the Year 2010" in the Yacht-Club-Berlin-Grünau
- Honorary member of the CVCP, Castiglione della Pescaia

== Personal life ==
Koch lives in Munich and works in the marine industry as sailmaking consultant, sailing coach and consultant for tracking and trace.
