= Gregor Bornemann =

German sailor

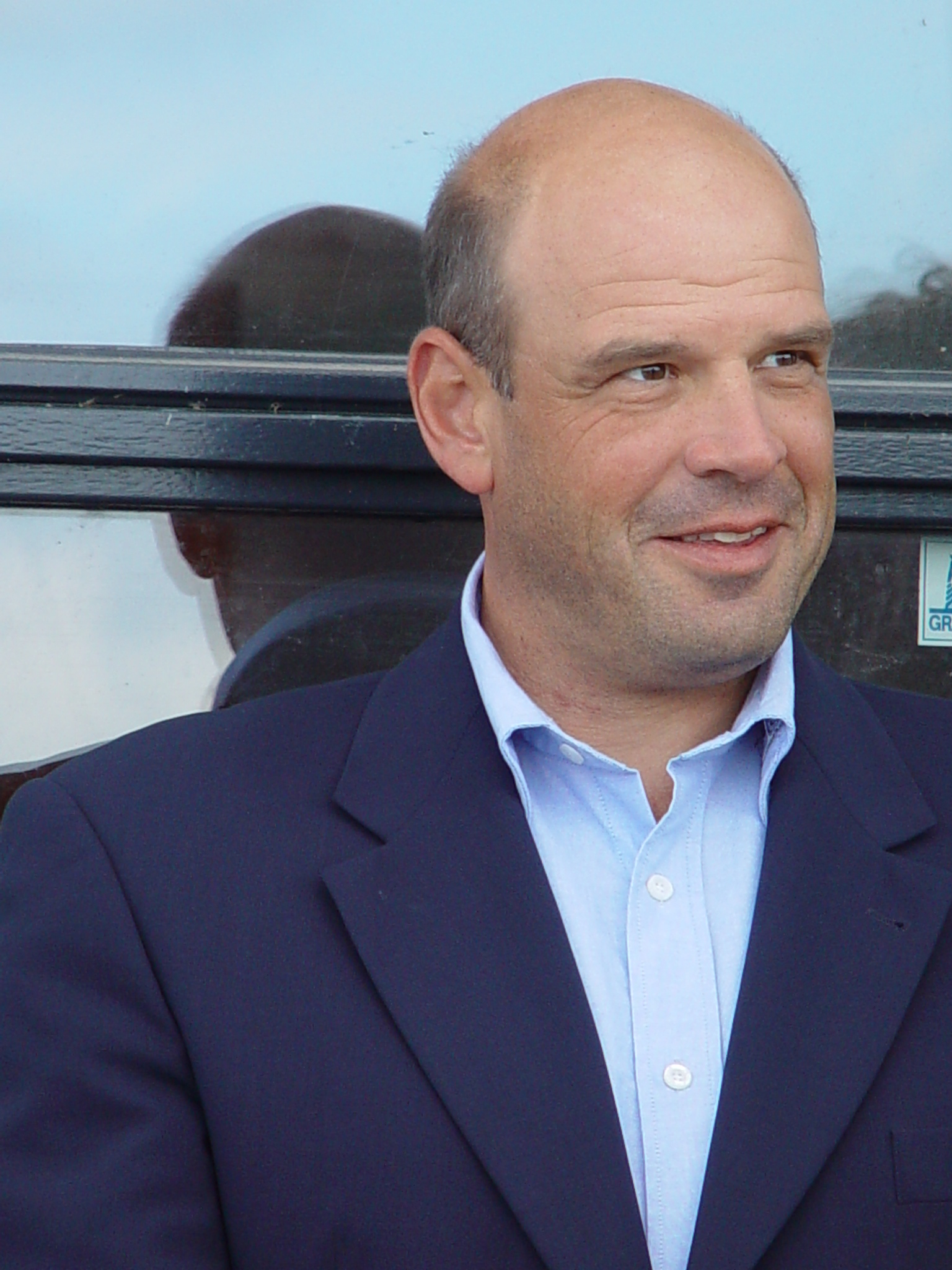
- Gregor Bornemann during Europeans Soling in Medemblik 2005

Personal information
- Nickname: Maremma boy
- Nationality: German
- Born: 24 January 1969 (age 57) Munich, West Germany
- Height: 1.85 m (6 ft 1 in)

Sailing career
- Sport: Sailing
- Club: Diessner-Segel-Club e.V.
- Class(es): Soling, Dragon, Star, ASSO99
Medal record
Representing Germany
World Championship
Gold medal – first place	2005 Castiglione della Pescaia	Soling
Gold medal – first place	2010 Porto Alegre	Soling
Silver medal – second place	2009 Etobicoke	Soling
Soling World Master Championship
Silver medal – second place	2014	Soling
European Championship
Gold medal – first place	2005 Medemblik	Soling
Gold medal – first place	2009 Lovere	Soling
Silver medal – second place	2003 Torbole	Soling
Silver medal – second place	2006 Balatonfüred	Soling
Silver medal – second place	2008 Balatonfüred	Soling
Silver medal – second place	2010 La Trinité-sur-Mer	Soling
Silver medal – second place	2013 Castiglione della Pescaia	Soling
Austrian Championships
Gold medal – first place	1995	Soling
Silver medal – second place	1996	Soling
Silver medal – second place	1999	Soling
Silver medal – second place	2002	Soling
Silver medal – second place	2008	Soling
Bronze medal – third place	1981	Soling
Bronze medal – third place	1982	Soling
Bronze medal – third place	2003	Soling
Bronze medal – third place	2010	Soling
Bronze medal – third place	2017	Soling
Canadian Championships
Silver medal – second place	2013	Soling
Czech Republic Championships
Gold medal – first place	1997	Soling
Spanish Championships
Gold medal – first place	2018	Soling
Silver medal – second place	2012	Soling
French Championships
Silver medal – second place	2018	Soling
West-German Championships
Silver medal – second place	1981	Soling
British Championships
Bronze medal – third place	2006	Soling
German Championships
Gold medal – first place	2006	Soling
Gold medal – first place	2007	Soling
Gold medal – first place	2008	Soling
Silver medal – second place	2009	Soling
Bronze medal – third place	1990	Soling
Bronze medal – third place	2010	Soling
Bronze medal – third place	2013	Soling
Hungarian Championship
Gold medal – first place	2004	Soling
Silver medal – second place	2010	Soling
Bronze medal – third place	2017	Soling
Italian Championship
Gold medal – first place	2002	Soling
Gold medal – first place	2003	Soling
Gold medal – first place	2004	Soling
Gold medal – first place	2006	Soling
Gold medal – first place	2007	Soling
Gold medal – first place	2009	Soling
Gold medal – first place	2014	Soling
Silver medal – second place	1989	Soling
Silver medal – second place	2015	Soling
Silver medal – second place	2016	Soling
Silver medal – second place	2017	Soling
Silver medal – second place	2018	Soling
Norwegian Championship
Gold medal – first place	2006	Soling
Gold medal – first place	2007	Soling
- Updated on 15 February 2022

Gregor Bornemann (born 24 January 1969) is a German sailor. As a bowman, he became twice World Champion in the Soling, together with his teammates Roman Koch and Maxl Koch.

== Sailing life ==
Bornemann as bowman won his first Soling World Championship 20–27 May 2005 of the Tyrrhenian Sea in front of Castiglione della Pescaia, Italy with Roman and Maxl Koch. The second time took place five years later 5–13 February on the Guaiba river off the coast of Porto Alegre, Brazil. After the Championship in Castellione the "Koch" team earned the nickname "The Maremma boys". In 2009 the "Koch" team took the silver at the Soling Worlds in Etobicoke, Canada. Furthermore, Bornemann won two gold and five silver medals at Soling European Championships between 2003 and 2013 all as bowman and with the same team members. Bornemann holds many national Championships in several countries.

Gregor became "Sailor of the Year 2010" in the Yacht-Club-Berlin-Grünau.

== Personal life ==
Bornemann lives in Munich and works in the food and beverage trademark industry to protect royal brands.
