= Maxl Koch =

German sailor

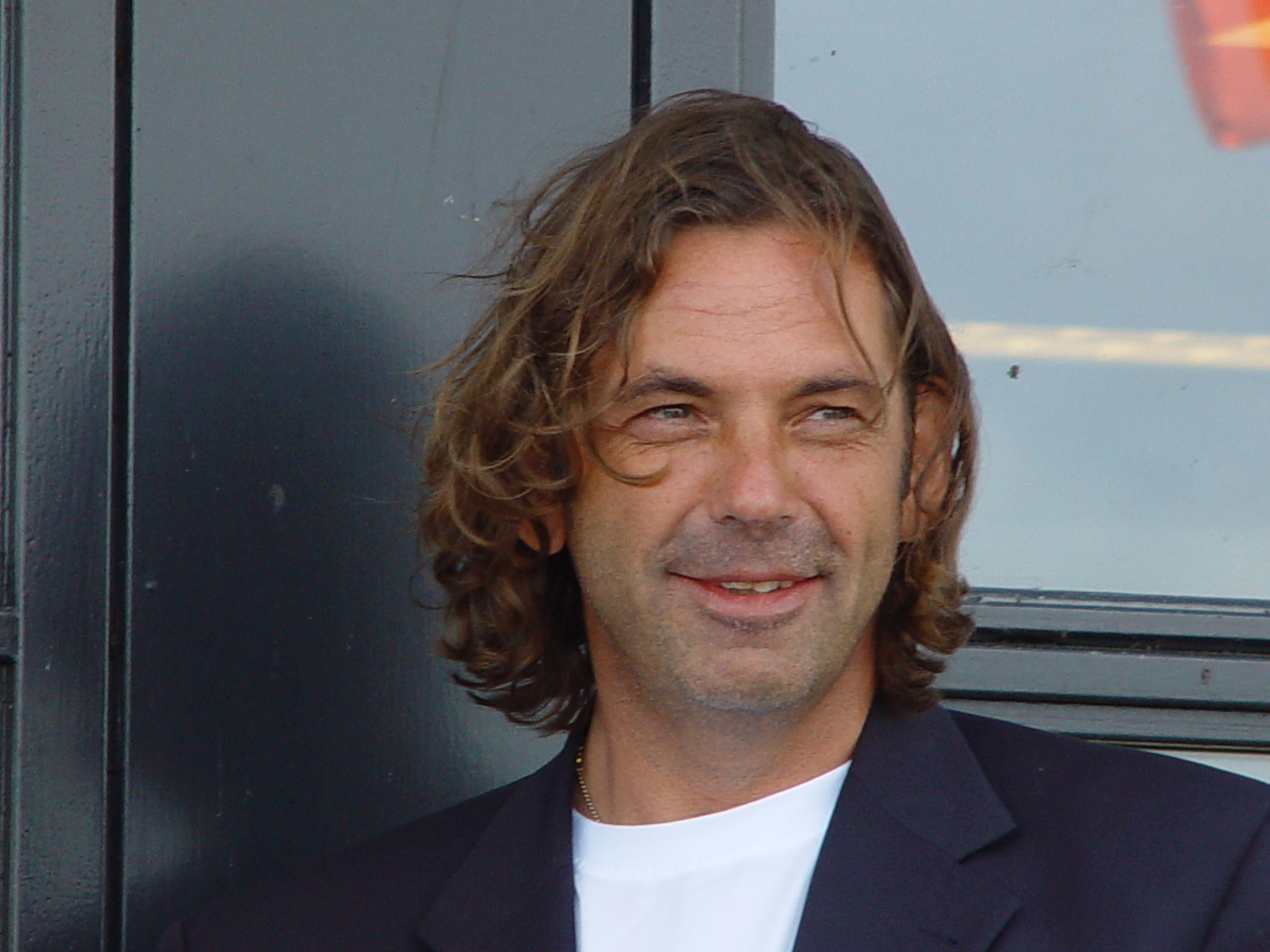
- Maxl Koch during Europeans Soling in Medemblik 2005

Personal information
- Full name: Maximilian Ernst Koch
- Nickname: Maremma boy
- Nationality: Germany
- Born: 8 October 1959 (age 66) Munich, West Germany
- Height: 1.92 m (6 ft 4 in)

Sailing career
- Sport: Sailing
- Club: Chiemsee Yacht Club
- Class(es): Flying Dutchman, Soling, Dragon
Medal record
Representing Germany
World Championship
Gold medal – first place	2005 Castiglione della Pescaia, Italy	Soling
Gold medal – first place	2010 Porto Alegre, Brazil	Soling
Silver medal – second place	2009 Etobicoke, Canada	Soling
Soling World Master Championship
Silver medal – second place	2014	Soling
European Championship
Gold medal – first place	2005 Medemblik, Netherlands	Soling
Gold medal – first place	2009 Lovere, Italy	Soling
Silver medal – second place	2003 Torbole, Italy	Soling
Silver medal – second place	2006 Balatonfüred, Hungary	Soling
Silver medal – second place	2008 Balatonfüred, Hungary	Soling
Silver medal – second place	2010 La Trinité-sur-Mer, France	Soling
Silver medal – second place	2013 Castiglione della Pescaia, Italy	Soling
Austrian Championships AUT
Gold medal – first place	1995	Soling
Silver medal – second place	1996	Soling
Silver medal – second place	1999	Soling
Silver medal – second place	2002	Soling
Silver medal – second place	2008	Soling
Bronze medal – third place	1981	Soling
Bronze medal – third place	1982	Soling
Bronze medal – third place	2003	Soling
Bronze medal – third place	2010	Soling
Bronze medal – third place	2017	Soling
Canadian Championships CAN
Silver medal – second place	2013	Soling
Czech Republic Championships CZE
Gold medal – first place	1997	Soling
Spanish Championships ESP
Gold medal – first place	2018	Soling
Silver medal – second place	2012	Soling
French Championships FRA
Silver medal – second place	2018	Soling
West-German Championships FRG
Silver medal – second place	1981	Soling
Great Britain GBR
Bronze medal – third place	2006	Soling
German Championships GER
Gold medal – first place	2006	Soling
Gold medal – first place	2007	Soling
Gold medal – first place	2008	Soling
Silver medal – second place	2009	Soling
Bronze medal – third place	1990	Soling
Bronze medal – third place	2010	Soling
Bronze medal – third place	2013	Soling
Hungarian Championship HUN
Gold medal – first place	2004	Soling
Silver medal – second place	2010	Soling
Bronze medal – third place	2017	Soling
Italian Championship ITA
Gold medal – first place	2002	Soling
Gold medal – first place	2003	Soling
Gold medal – first place	2004	Soling
Gold medal – first place	2006	Soling
Gold medal – first place	2007	Soling
Gold medal – first place	2009	Soling
Gold medal – first place	2014	Soling
Silver medal – second place	1989	Soling
Silver medal – second place	2015	Soling
Silver medal – second place	2016	Soling
Silver medal – second place	2017	Soling
Silver medal – second place	2018	Soling
Dutch Championship NED
Bronze medal – third place	1982	Soling
Norwegian Championship NOR
Gold medal – first place	2006	Soling
Gold medal – first place	2007	Soling
- Updated on 15 February 2022

Maximilian Ernst Koch (born 8 October 1959) is a German sailor. As midperson, he became twice World Champion in the Soling together with his teammates Roman Koch and Gregor Bornemann.

== Sailing life ==
Koch switched, with his brother Roman Koch, after a good run in the Flying Dutchman, in 1977 to the Soling. Koch as midperson won his first Soling World Championship 20–27 May 2005 of the Tyrrhenian Sea in front of Castiglione della Pescaia, Italy with Roman Koch and Gregor Bornemann. The second time took place five years later from 5–13 February on the Guaiba river off the coast of Porto Alegre, Brazil. After the championship in Castellione the Koch team earned the nickname "The Maremma boys". In 2009 the Koch team took the silver at the Soling Worlds in Etobicoke, Canada. Furthermore, Koch won two gold and five silver medals at Soling European Championships between 2003 and 2013 all as midperson and with the same team members. Koch holds many national championships in several countries.

Maxl became "Sailor of the Year 2010" in the Yacht-Club-Berlin-Grünau.

== Personal life ==
Koch lives in Munich and works in the insurance and art gallery branch.
