= List of South American Championships medalists in sailing =

This is a List of South American Championships medalists in sailing.

== 470 ==
Year	Gold	Silver	Bronze
2017 Porto Alegre	Brazil; Geison Mendes Dzioubanov; Gustavo Thiesen	Brazil; Henrique Haddad; Bruno Abdulklech	Brazil; Fernanda Oliveira; Ana Luiza Barbachan

== 49er ==
Year	Gold	Silver	Bronze
2016 Rio de Janeiro	Australia; Nathan Outteridge; Iain Jensen	Poland; Łukasz Przybytek; Paweł Kołodziński	New Zealand; Peter Burling; Blair Tuke

== 49er FX ==
Year	Gold	Silver	Bronze
2016 Rio de Janeiro	Argentina; Victoria Travascio; María Sol Branz	New Zealand; Alexandra Maloney; Molly Meech	France; Sarah Steyaert; Aude Compan

== RS:X ==
=== Men ===
Year	Gold	Silver	Bronze
2017 Buenos Aires	Bautista Saubidet Birkner (ARG)	Mariano Reutemann (ARG)	Francisco Saubidet Birkner (ARG)

=== Women and Youth ===
Year	Gold	Silver	Bronze
2017 Buenos Aires	Patrícia Freitas (BRA)	Maria Belen Bazo (PER)	Daniel Pereira (BRA)

== Soling ==
Year	Gold	Silver	Bronze
1971 Argentina; Buenos Aires	Argentina; Horatio Campi; Crew not documented	Not documented	Not documented
1972 Brazil; Rio de Janeiro	Brazil; Gastão Brun; Crew not documented	Brazil; Ivan Pimentel; Crew not documented	Brazil; Axel Schmidt; Crew not documented
1973 Argentina; Buenos Aires	Argentina; Ricardo Boneo; Crew not documented	Not documented	Not documented
1974 Brazil; Rio de Janeiro	Brazil; Gastão Brun; Crew not documented	Brazil; Erik Schmidt; Axel Schmidt; Not documented	Brazil; Harry Adler; Crew not documented
1975 Argentina; Mar del Plata	Argentina; Ricardo Boneo; Héctor Campos; Hugo Arazi	Spain; Juan Costas; Humberto Costas; Felix Anglada	Argentina; Pedro Ferrero; Andrés Robinson; Jorge Rão
1976 Brazil; Rio de Janeiro	Brazil; Gastão Brun	Not documented	Not documented
1977 Brazil; Rio de Janeiro	Brazil; Augusto Barrozo; Carlos Brito; Sergio Nascimento	Netherlands; Geert Bakker; Ken Berkeley Australia; Daniel Adler Brazil	Brazil; Fernando Nabuco; R. Nabuco; J. Zarif
1978 Argentina; Buenos Aires	Brazil; Fernando Nabuco; Crew not documented	Argentina; Pedro Ferrero; Crew not documented	Argentina; A. Zucolli; Crew not documented
1979 Brazil; Rio de Janeiro	Brazil; Vicente Brun; Not documented	Argentina; Pedro Ferrero; Not documented	Argentina; A. Zucolli; Not documented
1980 Argentina; Río de la Plata; Rio de Janeiro	United States; Jim Coggan; Pedro Ferrero Argentina; Alberto Llorens Argentina	Argentina; Claudio Fassardi; Jose Atencio; Miguel Fisher	Argentina; Ricardo Boneo; Santiago Austin; Pablo Campos
1981 Not Sailed
1982 Not Sailed
1983 Brazil; Rio de Janeiro	Brazil; Torben Grael; Daniel Adler; Ronaldo Senfft	Brazil; Augusto Barrozo; A.A. Guarischi; R. Kaufmann	Brazil; Reinaldo Conrad; C. Bieckard; C. Rittscher
1984 Argentina; Buenos Aires	Brazil; Augusto Barrozo; Crew not documented	Not documented	Not documented
1985 Argentina; Buenos Aires	Argentina; Horatio Pettamenti; Crew not documented	Not documented	Not documented
1986 Uruguay; Punta del Este	Argentina; Horatio Pettamenti; Crew not documented	Not documented	Not documented
1987 Uruguay; Punta del Este	Brazil; Augusto Barrozo; Crew not documented	Argentina; Guillermo Castro; Crew not documented	Uruguay; Bernd Knuppel; Crew not documented
1988 Not sailed
1989 Not sailed
1990 Brazil; Armação dos Búzios	Brazil; Jose Paulo Dias; Daniel Adler; N. Palcão	Brazil; Reinaldo Conrad; Ralph Conrad; Roberto Skuplik	Brazil; J. King; L. Carlos F. Simão; D. Wilcox
1991 Punta del Este			
1992 Not sailed
1993 Not sailed
1994 Not sailed
1995 Not sailed
1996 Not sailed
1997 Paranaguá	Brazil; Alan Adler; Crew not documented	Brazil; Jose Paulo Dias; Crew not documented	Brazil; Luciano Oliveira; Crew not documented
1998 Armação dos Búzios	Brazil; Jose Paulo Dias; Alessandro Gioia; Daniel Glomb	Brazil; Alan Adler; Marcelo Ferreira; Daniel Adler	Brazil; George Nehm; Marcos Ribeiro; Lucio Ribeiro
1999 Paranaguá	Argentina; Gustavo Warburg; Matias Collins; Maximo Smith	Brazil; Alan Adler; Marcelo Ferreira; Daniel Glomb	Brazil; Jose Paulo Dias; Ronaldo Senfft; Daniel Adler
2000 Porto Alegre	Brazil; Alan Adler; Crew not documented	Uruguay; Ricardo Fabbini; Crew not documented	Brazil; Daniel Glomb; Crew not documented
2001 Buenos Aires	Argentina; Martin Busch; Pablo Noceti; Ismael Ayerza	Argentina; Miguel Saubidet; Cristian Petersen; Lucas Petersen	Argentina; Gustavo Warburg; Hernan Celedoni; Maximo Smith
2002 Porto Alegre	Brazil; Alexandre Paradeda; Caio Vergo; Andre Gick	Argentina; Gustavo Warburg; Santiago Jost; Maximo Feldtmann	Brazil; George Nehm; Marcos Ribeiro; Lúcio Ribeiro
2003 Porto Alegre	Argentina; Gustavo Warburg; Hernan Celedoni; Maximo Smith	Argentina; Martin Busch; Pablo Noceti; Andres Ezcurra	Brazil; Daniel Glomb; Andre Gick; Caio Vergo
2004 Porto Alegre	Brazil; George Nehm; Marcos Ribeiro; Lúcio Ribeiro	Brazil; Daniel Glomb; Andre Gick; Caio Vergo	Brazil; Ernesto Neugebauer; Lucas Ostergren; Adrion Santos
2005 Punta del Este	Argentina; Gustavo Warburg; Erich Mones Ruiz; Maximo Smith	Brazil; George Nehm; Marcos Ribeiro; Lúcio Ribeiro	Argentina; Martin Busch; Pablo Noceti; Maximo Feldtmann
2006 San Isidro	Argentina; Gustavo Warburg; Hernan Celedoni; Maximo Smith	Brazil; George Nehm; Marcos Ribeiro; Lúcio Ribeiro	Argentina; Martin Busch; Pablo Noceti; Maximo Feldtmann
2007 Porto Alegre	Brazil; George Nehm; Marcos Ribeiro; Lúcio Ribeiro	Argentina; Gustavo Warburg; Maximo Feldtmann; Maximo Smith	Brazil; Andre Wahrlich; Andre Gick; Henrique De Lorenzi
2008 Punta del Este	Brazil; George Nehm; Marcos Ribeiro; Lúcio Ribeiro	Argentina; Gustavo Warburg; Nicolas; Maximo Smith	Argentina; Martin Busch; Diego Weppler; Juan Pedro Masseroni
2009 Colonia del Sacramento	Argentina; Gustavo Warburg; Maximo Feldtmann; Maximo Smith	Brazil; George Nehm; Marcos Ribeiro; Lúcio Ribeiro	Argentina; Martin Busch; Diego Weppler; Zimermann
2010 Punta del Este	Brazil; Cicero Hartmann; Andre Renard; Flávio Quevedo	Brazil; Guilherme Roth; Marcos Ribeiro; Lúcio Ribeiro	Argentina; Santiago Nottebohm; Pablo Araujo; Lucas Tumulty
2011 Buenos Aires	Argentina; Gustavo Warburg; Eduardo Coulon; Maximo Smith	Argentina; Alberto Zanetti; Gerardo Della Torre; Ricky Homps	Argentina; Pablo Despontin; Pablo Noceti; Ezequiel Fernandez Sasso
2012 Punta del Este	Brazil; Andre Wahrlich; Manfredo Floricke; Leonardo Gomes	Brazil; George Nehm; Marcos Ribeiro; Lúcio Ribeiro	Argentina; Gustavo Warburg; Federico Calegari; Juan Lago
2013 San Isidro	Brazil; George Nehm; Marcos Ribeiro; Lúcio Ribeiro	Argentina; Pablo Despontin; Pablo Noceti; Ezequiel Fernandez Sasso	Argentina; Gustavo Warburg; Eduardo Coulon; Maximo Smith
2014 Porto Alegre	Brazil; Cicero Hartmann; Flavio Quevedo; Andre Renard	Brazil; George Nehm; Marcos Ribeiro; Lúcio Ribeiro	Brazil; Nelson Ilha; Gustavo Ilha; Carlo de Leo
2015 San Isidro	Brazil; Cicero Hartmann; Flavio Quevedo; Andre Renard	Argentina; Martin Busch; Eduardo Zimermann; Maximo Feldtmann	Brazil; Kadu Bergenthal; Eduardo Cavalli; Renan Oliveira
2016 Porto Alegre	Brazil; Cicero Hartmann; Flavio Quevedo; Andre Renard	Brazil; Kadu Bergenthal; Eduardo Cavalli; Renan Oliveira	Brazil; Nelson Ilha; Gustavo Ilha; Carlo de Leo
2017 Rio Grande	Brazil; George Nehm; Marcos Ribeiro; Lúcio Ribeiro	Brazil; Cicero Hartmann; Flavio Quevedo; Andre Renard	Brazil; Kadu Bergenthal; Eduardo Cavalli; Renan Oliveira
2018 Fray Bentos	Brazil; Dennis Koch; Manfredo Floricke; Pedro Ilha	Brazil; Kadu Bergenthal; Eduardo Cavalli; Renan Oliveira	United States; Matias Collins; Tomas Morgan; Mariano Cambon
2019 Punta del Este	Brazil; Cicero Hartmann; Flavio Quevedo; Andre Renard	Brazil; Kadu Bergenthal; Vilnei Goldmeier; Philipp Chtmann	Brazil; Nelson Ilha; Manfredo Flöricke; Pedro Ilha
2020 Darsena			

Medal tally
Rank	Nation	Gold	Silver	Bronze	Total
1	Brazil (BRA)	26	18	18	62
2	Argentina (ARG)	12	12	13	37
3	United States (USA)	1	0	1	2
4	Uruguay (URU)	0	1	1	2
5	Netherlands (NED)	0	1	0	1
5	Spain (ESP)	0	1	0	1
Totals (6 entries)		39	33	33	105

== Star ==
Year	Gold	Silver	Bronze
2017 Olivos	Brazil; M. Bellotti; M. Bueno	Argentina; H. Longarela; H. Longarela	Argentina; F. MacGowan; A. Simonet

== See also ==
- SASC
