= Soling South American Championship =

Soling
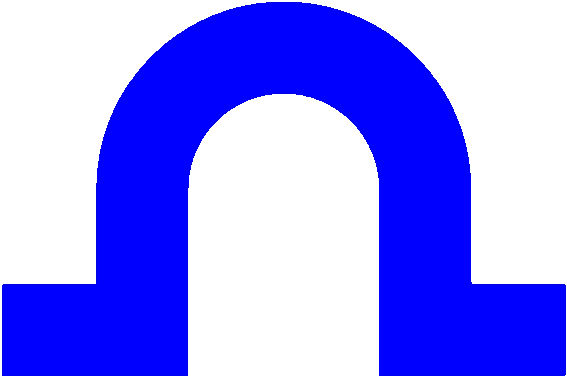
- Class insigna

Development
- Name: Soling

The Soling South American Championship is an International sailing regatta in the Soling organized by the International Soling Association under auspiciën of World Sailing. The initiative for this event was taken, inspired by the success of the Soling European Championship in 1971 to promote Soling sailing in the South America. Since then about 40 Soling South American Championship were held. The popularity grew during the Olympic period of the Soling. After that era the event continued and is still reasonable successful. The Soling South American Championship is an "Open" event. This means that competitors from all over the world are eligible to enter.

== Editions ==
Year	City	Country	Dates	Boats	Athletes	Nations	Note/ Reference
1971	Buenos Aires	Argentina	4–11 April	-	-	-	,
1972	Rio de Janeiro	Brazil	4–11 February	13	29	2	,
1973	Buenos Aires	Argentina	13–21 April	-	-	-	,
1974	Rio de Janeiro	Brazil	23 November - 1 December	16	48	3	,
1975	Mar del Plata	Argentina	-	-	-	4	,
1976	Rio de Janeiro	Brazil	-	-	-	-	,
1977	Rio de Janeiro	Brazil	4–13 March	11	33	3	,
1978	Buenos Aires	Argentina		14	42	2	,
1979	Rio de Janeiro	Brazil	-	-	-	-	
1980	Rio de la Plata	Argentina	14–23 November	-	-	-	
1981	Not Sailed						
1982	Not Sailed						
1983	Rio de Janeiro	Brazil	January 1983	13	39	2	
1984	Buenos Aires	Argentina	-	-	-		
1985	Buenos Aires	Argentina	-	-	-		
1986	Punta del Este	Uruguay	-	-	-	-	
1987	Punta del Este	Uruguay	-	27	9	3	
1988	Not Sailed						
1989	Not Sailed						
1990	Armação dos Búzios	Brazil	January	21	7	2	
1991	Punta del Este	Uruguay					
1992	Not Sailed						
1993	Not Sailed						
1994	Not Sailed						
1995	Not Sailed						
1996	Not Sailed						
1997	Paranaguá	Brazil	27 February – 2 March				
1998	Búzios	Brazil	8–10 May				
1999	Paranaguá	Brazil	19–21 May				
2000	Porto Alegre, Rio Grande do Sul	Brazil	4–11 April				,
2001	Buenos Aires	Argentina	9–11 November				
2002	Porto Alegre	Brazil	15–17 November				
2003	Porto Alegre	Brazil	17–20 April				
2004	Porto Alegre		11–14 November				
2005	Punta del Este	Uruguay	24–27 November				,
2006	San Isidro	Argentina	13–16 April				,
2007	Porto Alegre	Brazil	4–7 April				,
2008	Punta del Este	Uruguay	10–13 December				,
2009	Colonia del Sacramento	Uruguay	9–12 December				,
2010	Punta del Este	Uruguay	13–15 November				,
2011	Buenos Aires	Argentina	8–10 October				,
2012	Punta del Este	Uruguay	15–18 November				,
2013	Buenos Aires	Argentina	28–30 April				,
2014	Porto Alegre	Brazil	17–20 April				
2015	Buenos Aires	Argentina	20–23 November				,
2016	Porto Alegre	Brazil	21–24 June				,
2017	Rio Grande	Brazil	17–20 November				
2018	Frey Bentos	Uruguay	25–27 May				
2019	Punta del Este	Uruguay	14–17 November				,
2020	Darsena	Argentina	10–12 October				,

== Medalists ==
Year	Gold	Silver	Bronze
1971 Argentina; Buenos Aires	Argentina; Horatio Campi; Crew not documented	Not documented	Not documented
1972 Brazil; Rio de Janeiro	Brazil; Gastão Brun; Crew not documented	Brazil; Ivan Pimentel; Crew not documented	Brazil; Axel Schmidt; Crew not documented
1973 Argentina; Buenos Aires	Argentina; Ricardo Boneo; Crew not documented	Not documented	Not documented
1974 Brazil; Rio de Janeiro	Brazil; Gastão Brun; Crew not documented	Brazil; Erik Schmidt; Axel Schmidt; Not documented	Brazil; Harry Adler; Crew not documented
1975 Argentina; Mar del Plata	Argentina; Ricardo Boneo; Héctor Campos; Hugo Arazi	Spain; Juan Costas; Humberto Costas; Felix Anglada	Argentina; Pedro Ferrero; Andrés Robinson; Jorge Rão
1976 Brazil; Rio de Janeiro	Brazil; Gastão Brun	Not documented	Not documented
1977 Brazil; Rio de Janeiro	Brazil; Augusto Barrozo; Carlos Brito; Sergio Nascimento	Netherlands; Geert Bakker; Ken Berkeley Australia; Daniel Adler Brazil	Brazil; Fernando Nabuco; R. Nabuco; J. Zarif
1978 Argentina; Buenos Aires	Brazil; Fernando Nabuco; Crew not documented	Argentina; Pedro Ferrero; Crew not documented	Argentina; A. Zucolli; Crew not documented
1979 Brazil; Rio de Janeiro	Brazil; Vicente Brun; Not documented	Argentina; Pedro Ferrero; Not documented	Argentina; A. Zucolli; Not documented
1980 Argentina; Río de la Plata; Rio de Janeiro	United States; Jim Coggan; Pedro Ferrero Argentina; Alberto Llorens Argentina	Argentina; Claudio Fassardi; Jose Atencio; Miguel Fisher	Argentina; Ricardo Boneo; Santiago Austin; Pablo Campos
1981 Not Sailed
1982 Not Sailed
1983 Brazil; Rio de Janeiro	Brazil; Torben Grael; Daniel Adler; Ronaldo Senfft	Brazil; Augusto Barrozo; A.A. Guarischi; R. Kaufmann	Brazil; Reinaldo Conrad; C. Bieckard; C. Rittscher
1984 Argentina; Buenos Aires	Brazil; Augusto Barrozo; Crew not documented	Not documented	Not documented
1985 Argentina; Buenos Aires	Argentina; Horatio Pettamenti; Crew not documented	Not documented	Not documented
1986 Uruguay; Punta del Este	Argentina; Horatio Pettamenti; Crew not documented	Not documented	Not documented
1987 Uruguay; Punta del Este	Brazil; Augusto Barrozo; Crew not documented	Argentina; Guillermo Castro; Crew not documented	Uruguay; Bernd Knuppel; Crew not documented
1988 Not sailed
1989 Not sailed
1990 Brazil; Armação dos Búzios	Brazil; Jose Paulo Dias; Daniel Adler; N. Palcão	Brazil; Reinaldo Conrad; Ralph Conrad; Roberto Skuplik	Brazil; J. King; L. Carlos F. Simão; D. Wilcox
1991 Punta del Este			
1992 Not sailed
1993 Not sailed
1994 Not sailed
1995 Not sailed
1996 Not sailed
1997 Paranaguá	Brazil; Alan Adler; Crew not documented	Brazil; Jose Paulo Dias; Crew not documented	Brazil; Luciano Oliveira; Crew not documented
1998 Armação dos Búzios	Brazil; Jose Paulo Dias; Alessandro Gioia; Daniel Glomb	Brazil; Alan Adler; Marcelo Ferreira; Daniel Adler	Brazil; George Nehm; Marcos Ribeiro; Lucio Ribeiro
1999 Paranaguá	Argentina; Gustavo Warburg; Matias Collins; Maximo Smith	Brazil; Alan Adler; Marcelo Ferreira; Daniel Glomb	Brazil; Jose Paulo Dias; Ronaldo Senfft; Daniel Adler
2000 Porto Alegre	Brazil; Alan Adler; Crew not documented	Uruguay; Ricardo Fabbini; Crew not documented	Brazil; Daniel Glomb; Crew not documented
2001 Buenos Aires	Argentina; Martin Busch; Pablo Noceti; Ismael Ayerza	Argentina; Miguel Saubidet; Cristian Petersen; Lucas Petersen	Argentina; Gustavo Warburg; Hernan Celedoni; Maximo Smith
2002 Porto Alegre	Brazil; Alexandre Paradeda; Caio Vergo; Andre Gick	Argentina; Gustavo Warburg; Santiago Jost; Maximo Feldtmann	Brazil; George Nehm; Marcos Ribeiro; Lúcio Ribeiro
2003 Porto Alegre	Argentina; Gustavo Warburg; Hernan Celedoni; Maximo Smith	Argentina; Martin Busch; Pablo Noceti; Andres Ezcurra	Brazil; Daniel Glomb; Andre Gick; Caio Vergo
2004 Porto Alegre	Brazil; George Nehm; Marcos Ribeiro; Lúcio Ribeiro	Brazil; Daniel Glomb; Andre Gick; Caio Vergo	Brazil; Ernesto Neugebauer; Lucas Ostergren; Adrion Santos
2005 Punta del Este	Argentina; Gustavo Warburg; Erich Mones Ruiz; Maximo Smith	Brazil; George Nehm; Marcos Ribeiro; Lúcio Ribeiro	Argentina; Martin Busch; Pablo Noceti; Maximo Feldtmann
2006 San Isidro	Argentina; Gustavo Warburg; Hernan Celedoni; Maximo Smith	Brazil; George Nehm; Marcos Ribeiro; Lúcio Ribeiro	Argentina; Martin Busch; Pablo Noceti; Maximo Feldtmann
2007 Porto Alegre	Brazil; George Nehm; Marcos Ribeiro; Lúcio Ribeiro	Argentina; Gustavo Warburg; Maximo Feldtmann; Maximo Smith	Brazil; Andre Wahrlich; Andre Gick; Henrique De Lorenzi
2008 Punta del Este	Brazil; George Nehm; Marcos Ribeiro; Lúcio Ribeiro	Argentina; Gustavo Warburg; Nicolas; Maximo Smith	Argentina; Martin Busch; Diego Weppler; Juan Pedro Masseroni
2009 Colonia del Sacramento	Argentina; Gustavo Warburg; Maximo Feldtmann; Maximo Smith	Brazil; George Nehm; Marcos Ribeiro; Lúcio Ribeiro	Argentina; Martin Busch; Diego Weppler; Zimermann
2010 Punta del Este	Brazil; Cicero Hartmann; Andre Renard; Flávio Quevedo	Brazil; Guilherme Roth; Marcos Ribeiro; Lúcio Ribeiro	Argentina; Santiago Nottebohm; Pablo Araujo; Lucas Tumulty
2011 Buenos Aires	Argentina; Gustavo Warburg; Eduardo Coulon; Maximo Smith	Argentina; Alberto Zanetti; Gerardo Della Torre; Ricky Homps	Argentina; Pablo Despontin; Pablo Noceti; Ezequiel Fernandez Sasso
2012 Punta del Este	Brazil; Andre Wahrlich; Manfredo Floricke; Leonardo Gomes	Brazil; George Nehm; Marcos Ribeiro; Lúcio Ribeiro	Argentina; Gustavo Warburg; Federico Calegari; Juan Lago
2013 San Isidro	Brazil; George Nehm; Marcos Ribeiro; Lúcio Ribeiro	Argentina; Pablo Despontin; Pablo Noceti; Ezequiel Fernandez Sasso	Argentina; Gustavo Warburg; Eduardo Coulon; Maximo Smith
2014 Porto Alegre	Brazil; Cicero Hartmann; Flavio Quevedo; Andre Renard	Brazil; George Nehm; Marcos Ribeiro; Lúcio Ribeiro	Brazil; Nelson Ilha; Gustavo Ilha; Carlo de Leo
2015 San Isidro	Brazil; Cicero Hartmann; Flavio Quevedo; Andre Renard	Argentina; Martin Busch; Eduardo Zimermann; Maximo Feldtmann	Brazil; Kadu Bergenthal; Eduardo Cavalli; Renan Oliveira
2016 Porto Alegre	Brazil; Cicero Hartmann; Flavio Quevedo; Andre Renard	Brazil; Kadu Bergenthal; Eduardo Cavalli; Renan Oliveira	Brazil; Nelson Ilha; Gustavo Ilha; Carlo de Leo
2017 Rio Grande	Brazil; George Nehm; Marcos Ribeiro; Lúcio Ribeiro	Brazil; Cicero Hartmann; Flavio Quevedo; Andre Renard	Brazil; Kadu Bergenthal; Eduardo Cavalli; Renan Oliveira
2018 Fray Bentos	Brazil; Dennis Koch; Manfredo Floricke; Pedro Ilha	Brazil; Kadu Bergenthal; Eduardo Cavalli; Renan Oliveira	United States; Matias Collins; Tomas Morgan; Mariano Cambon
2019 Punta del Este	Brazil; Cicero Hartmann; Flavio Quevedo; Andre Renard	Brazil; Kadu Bergenthal; Vilnei Goldmeier; Philipp Chtmann	Brazil; Nelson Ilha; Manfredo Flöricke; Pedro Ilha
2020 Darsena			

Medal tally
Rank	Nation	Gold	Silver	Bronze	Total
1	Brazil (BRA)	26	18	18	62
2	Argentina (ARG)	12	12	13	37
3	United States (USA)	1	0	1	2
4	Uruguay (URU)	0	1	1	2
5	Netherlands (NED)	0	1	0	1
5	Spain (ESP)	0	1	0	1
Totals (6 entries)		39	33	33	105
