= Soling South American Championship results (1971–1990) =

Soling
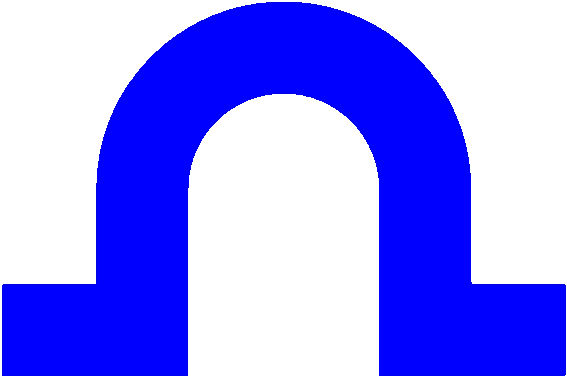

Development
- Name: Soling

This article stated the results of the South American Soling Championships from 1971 till 1979. Not all crew names are documented in the major sources: United States Soling Association (USSA) bulletin "Leading Edge" and International Soling Association (ISA) magazine "Soling Sailing".

== 1971 Final results ==
Only the winning helmsman and venue are documented.

1971
Event title
- Edition: 1,

Event details
- Venue: Buenos Aires, Argentina
- Yachts: 19

Competitors
- Competitors: 57

Results
- (gold) Gold: Argentina A 16; Horatio Campi; Crew not documented
- (silver) Silver: Not documented
- (bronze) Bronze: Not documented

== 1972 Final results ==
1972
Event title
- Edition: 2,

Event details
- Venue: Rio de Janeiro, Brazil
- Dates: 4 February – 11 February
- Yachts: 13
- Opening ceremony: 4 February

Competitors
- Competitors: 29
- Competing nations: 2

Results
- (gold) Gold: Brazil; Gastão Brun; Crew not documented
- (silver) Silver: Brazil; Ivan Pimentel; Crew not documented
- (bronze) Bronze: Brazil; Axel Schmidt; Crew not documented

| Rank | Country | Helmsman | Crew | Sail No. | Race 1 | | Race 2 | | Race 3 | | Race 4 | | Race 5 | | Race 6 | | Race 7 | | Total | Total – discard |
| Rank | Country | Helmsman | Crew | Sail No. | Pos. | Pts. | Pos. | Pts. | Pos. | Pts. | Pos. | Pts. | Pos. | Pts. | Pos. | Pts. | Pos. | Pts. | Total | Total – discard |
| 1st place, gold medalist(s) | BRA | Gastão Brun | Not documented | BL 15 | 1 | 0.0 | ~~7~~ | ~~13.0~~ | 3 | 5.7 | 2 | 3.0 | 1 | 0.0 | 1 | 0.0 | 1 | 0.0 | 21.7 | 8.7 |
| 2nd place, silver medalist(s) | BRA | Ivan Pimental | Not documented | BL 29 | 2 | 3.0 | 1 | 0.0 | 1 | 0.0 | ~~DNF~~ | ~~20.0~~ | 3 | 5.7 | 2 | 3.0 | 3 | 5.7 | 37.4 | 17.4 |
| 3rd place, bronze medalist(s) | BRA | Axel Schmidt | Not documented | BL 5 | 4 | 8.0 | 2 | 3.0 | 2 | 3.0 | 4 | 8.0 | 2 | 3.0 | 3 | 5.7 | ~~9~~ | ~~15.0~~ | 45.7 | 30.7 |
| 4 | ARG | Ricardo Boneo | Not documented | A 15 | 3 | 5.7 | ~~DNF~~ | ~~20.0~~ | 5 | 10.0 | 1 | 0.0 | 5 | 10.0 | 4 | 8.0 | 7 | 13.0 | 66.7 | 46.7 |
| 5 | BRA | Erik Schmidt | Not documented | BL 21 | 6 | 11.7 | 3 | 5.7 | 4 | 8.0 | ~~DSQ~~ | ~~20.0~~ | 4 | 8.0 | DSQ | 20.0 | 2 | 3.0 | 76.4 | 56.4 |
| 6 | ARG | Jorge Vago | Not documented | A 5 | ~~10~~ | ~~16.0~~ | 4 | 8.0 | 6 | 11.7 | 6 | 11.7 | 8 | 14.0 | 6 | 11.7 | 4 | 8.0 | 81.1 | 65.1 |
| 7 | BRA | Augusto Barroso | Not documented | BL 4 | 9 | 15.0 | 5 | 10.0 | ~~10~~ | ~~16.0~~ | 3 | 5.7 | 6 | 11.7 | 5 | 10.0 | 10 | 16.0 | 84.4 | 68.4 |
| 8 | BRA | Antonio Ferrer | Not documented | BL 22 | 8 | 14.0 | 6 | 11.7 | 7 | 13.0 | 5 | 10.0 | 7 | 13.0 | 9 | 15.0 | 6 | 11.7 | 88.4 | 73.4 |
| 9 | ARG | Wilson Pereyra | Not documented | A 20 | 5 | 10.0 | DNF | 20.0 | 9 | 15.0 | 7 | 13.0 | DNF | 20.0 | 7 | 13.0 | 5 | 10.0 | 101.0 | 81.0 |
| 10 | BRA | Candido Guerreiro | Not documented | BL 7 | 7 | 13.0 | 10 | 16.0 | ~~11~~ | ~~17.0~~ | 9 | 15.0 | 10 | 16.0 | 10 | 16.0 | 8 | 14.0 | 107.0 | 90.0 |
| 11 | BRA | Walter von Hütschler | Not documented | BL 25 | ~~DNS~~ | ~~20.0~~ | 9 | 15.0 | 8 | 14.0 | 8 | 14.0 | 9 | 15.0 | 8 | 14.0 | DNS | 20.0 | 112.0 | 92.0 |
| 12 | BRA | Paolo Pirani | Not documented | BL 17 | 11 | 17.0 | ~~DNF~~ | ~~20.0~~ | 13 | 19.0 | 10 | 16.0 | 11 | 17.0 | 11 | 17.0 | 11 | 17.0 | 123.0 | 103.0 |
| 13 | BRA | Paulo Neiva | Not documented | BL 16 | ~~DNS~~ | ~~20.0~~ | 8 | 14.0 | 12 | 18.0 | DNS | 20.0 | DNS | 20.0 | DNS | 20.0 | DNS | 20.0 | 132.0 | 112.0 |

Legend: DNF – Did not finish; DNS – Did not start; DSQ – Disqualified;
Discard is crossed out and does not count for the overall result.

- 1972 Progress

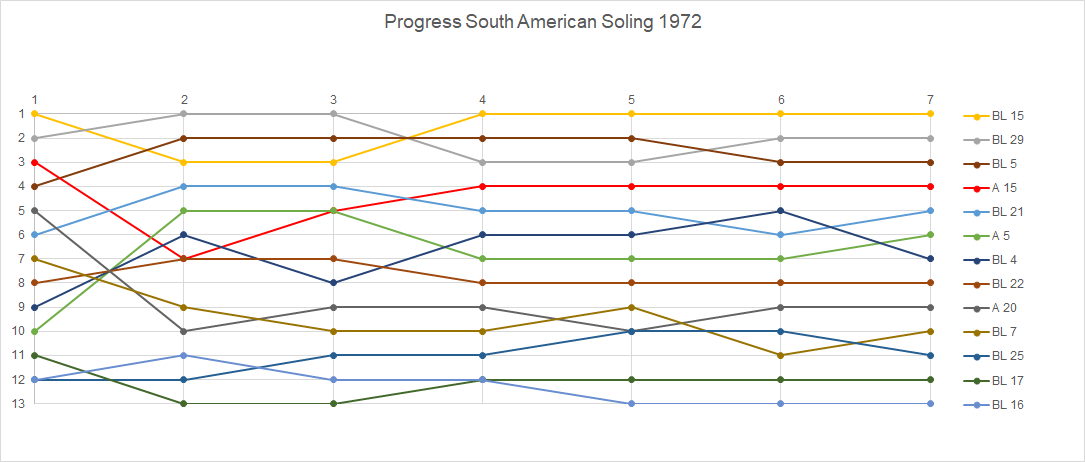

== 1973 Final results ==
Only the winning helmsman and venue are documented.

1973
Event title
- Edition: 3,

Event details
- Venue: Buenos Aires, Argentina

Results
- (gold) Gold: Argentina A 15; Ricardo Boneo; Crew not documented
- (silver) Silver: Not documented
- (bronze) Bronze: Not documented

== 1974 Final results ==
Only ranking and venue but no detailed results are documented.

1974
Event title
- Edition: 4,

Event details
- Venue: Rio de Janeiro, Brazil
- Dates: 23 November - 1 December
- Yachts: 16

Competitors
- Competitors: 48
- Competing nations: 3

Results
- (gold) Gold: Brazil; Gastão Brun; Crew not documented
- (silver) Silver: Brazil; Erik Schmidt; Axel Schmidt; Not documented
- (bronze) Bronze: Brazil; Harry Adler; Crew not documented

| Rank | Country | Sailnumber | Boatname | Helmsman | Crew |
|---|---|---|---|---|---|
| 1st place, gold medalist(s) | Brazil | BL 15 | Revolution | Gastão Brun | Not documented |
| 2nd place, silver medalist(s) | Brazil | BL 30 | Osprey XIV | Erik Schmidt | Axel Schmidt; Not documented |
| 3rd place, bronze medalist(s) | Brazil | BL 34 | Clementine | Harry Adler | Not documented |
| 4 | Brazil | BL 8 | Clepsidra | Murillo Borges | Not documented |
| 5 | Brazil | BL 26 | Candango | Gregrio da Rocha | Not documented |
| 6 | Brazil | BL 20 | Feitico | Augusto Barrozo | Not documented |
| 7 | Brazil | BL 14 | Saci | Edgard Hasselmann | Not documented |
| 8 | Argentina | A 15 | Pampa | Ricardo Boneo | Duperron; Scuderi |
| 9 | Argentina | A 21 | Indesio | Pedro Ferrero | Not documented |
| 10 | Argentina | A 4 | Storm King | Jorge Pochat | Not documented |
| 11 | Brazil | BL 18 | Itaipu | Robinson Hasselmann | Not documented |
| 12 | Brazil | BL 33 | Krishna | Eduardo de Souza | Not documented |
| 13 | Venezuela | V 5 | Crocodilo | Edmund Napp | Not documented |
| 14 | Argentina | A 3 | Rumor | Claudio de J. Fassardi | Not documented |
| 15 | Brazil | BL 5 | Osprey XII | Roberto Teixeira Tacao | Not documented |
| 16 | Brazil | BL 22 | Pedro Bo | Amadeu Basdella Caparelli | Not documented |

== 1975 Final results ==
1975
Event title
- Edition: 5,

Event details
- Venue: Mar del Plata, Argentina

Competitors
- Competing nations: 4

Results
- (gold) Gold: Argentina; Ricardo Boneo; Hugo Arazi; Héctor Campos
- (silver) Silver: Spain; Juan Costas; Humberto Costas; Félix Anglada
- (bronze) Bronze: Argentina; Pedro Ferrero; Andrés Robinson; Jorge Rão

Only ranking of the first five boats no detailed results are documented.

| Rank | Country | Sailnumber | Boatname | Helmsman | Crew |
|---|---|---|---|---|---|
| 1st place, gold medalist(s) | Argentina | A 15 | Pampa | Ricardo Boneo | Héctor Campos; Hugo Arazi |
| 2nd place, silver medalist(s) | Spain | E 20 | Ababeth | Juan Costas | Humberto Costas; Félix Anglada |
| 3rd place, bronze medalist(s) | Argentina | A 21 | Indesio | Pedro Ferrero | Andrés Robinson; Jorge Rão |
| 4 | Argentina | A 5 | Huija | J. D. Vago | Not documented |
| 5 | West Germany | G | Candango | Andres von Eichen | Not documented |

== 1976 Final results ==
Only the winning helmsman and venue are documented.

1976
Event title
- Edition: 6,

Event details
- Venue: Rio de Janeiro, Brazil

Results
- (gold) Gold: Brazil BL 15; Gastão Brun; Crew not documented
- (silver) Silver: Not documented
- (bronze) Bronze: Not documented

== 1977 Final results ==
1977
Event title
- Edition: 7,
- Host: Iate Clube do Rio de Janeiro

Event details
- Venue: Rio de Janeiro, Brazil
- Dates: 4–13 March
- Yachts: 11

Competitors
- Competitors: 33
- Competing nations: 3

Results
- (gold) Gold: Brazil; Augusto Barrozo; Carlos Brito; Sergio Nascimento
- (silver) Silver: Netherlands; Geert Bakker; Ken Berkeley Australia; Daniel Adler Brazil
- (bronze) Bronze: Brazil; Fernando Nabuco; R. Nabuco; J. Zarif

| Rank | Country | Helmsman | Crew | Sail No. | Boat | Race 1 | | Race 2 | | Race 3 | | Race 4 | | Race 5 | | Race 6 | | Race 7 | | Total | Total – discard |
| Rank | Country | Helmsman | Crew | Sail No. | Boat | Pos. | Pts. | Pos. | Pts. | Pos. | Pts. | Pos. | Pts. | Pos. | Pts. | Pos. | Pts. | Pos. | Pts. | Total | Total – discard |
| 1st place, gold medalist(s) | BRA | Augusto Barrozo | Carlos Brito; Sergio Nascimento | BL 20 | Feitico V | 1 | 0.0 | 1 | 0.0 | 1 | 0.0 | 2 | 3.0 | 1 | 0.0 | ~~6~~ | ~~11.7~~ | 2 | 3.0 | 17.7 | 6.0 |
| 2nd place, silver medalist(s) | NED | Geert Bakker | Ken Berkeley Australia; Daniel Adler Brazil | H 17 (BL 33) | Cadans (Krishna) | 3 | 5.7 | 2 | 3.0 | ~~6~~ | ~~11.7~~ | 6 | 11.7 | 2 | 3.0 | 1 | 0.0 | 3 | 5.7 | 40.8 | 29.1 |
| 3rd place, bronze medalist(s) | BRA | Fernando Nabuco | R. Nabuco; J. Zarif | BL 32 | Quati | 2 | 3.0 | 3 | 5.7 | 5 | 10.0 | 1 | 0.0 | ~~6~~ | ~~11.7~~ | 3 | 5.7 | 4 | 8.0 | 44.1 | 32.4 |
| 4 | ARG | J. Frazer | C. Duperron; B. Saggese | A 11 | Saci | ~~8~~ | ~~14.0~~ | 4 | 8.0 | 3 | 5.7 | 4 | 8.0 | 3 | 5.7 | 5 | 10.0 | 8 | 14.0 | 65.4 | 51.4 |
| 5 | ARG | J.F. Pochat | C. Gall; J. Barreira | A 4 | Itaipu | 7 | 13.0 | 7 | 13.0 | 2 | 3.0 | 5 | 10.0 | 7 | 13.0 | ~~9~~ | ~~15.0~~ | 1 | 0.0 | 67.0 | 52.0 |
| 6 | ARG | L. Ricardo | L. Gianotti; J. Tasso | A 12 | Crocodilo | 5 | 10.0 | 5 | 10.0 | 4 | 8.0 | ~~8~~ | ~~14.0~~ | 5 | 10.0 | 4 | 8.0 | 7 | 13.0 | 73.0 | 59.0 |
| 7 | ARG | J.D. Vigo | L. Mormos; R. Szarfer | A 5 | Candango | 4 | 8.0 | ~~8~~ | ~~14.0~~ | 7 | 13.0 | 7 | 13.0 | 8 | 14.0 | 2 | 3.0 | 5 | 10.0 | 75.0 | 61.0 |
| 8 | BRA | Ernesto Reibelo | H.Gogarten; W. Soentsen | BL 30 | Osprey XIV | 6 | 11.7 | 6 | 11.7 | 8 | 14.0 | 3 | 5.7 | 4 | 8.0 | 8 | 14.0 | ~~9~~ | ~~15.0~~ | 80.1 | 65.1 |
| 9 | BRA | R.T. Tacao | G. Sasse; C. Sanches | BL 5 | Mulie | 9 | 15.0 | 9 | 15.0 | 9 | 15.0 | 9 | 15.0 | ~~DSQ~~ | ~~18.0~~ | 7 | 13.0 | 6 | 11.7 | 102.7 | 84.7 |
| 10 | BRA | M. Lobo | T. Heimann; G. Lobo | BL 6 | Sudoeste | 10 | 16.0 | 10 | 16.0 | ~~DNC~~ | ~~18.0~~ | DNC | 18.0 | 9 | 15.0 | 10 | 16.0 | 11 | 17.0 | 116.0 | 98.0 |
| 11 | BRA | C. Schneider | F. Beck; E. Vidal | BL 4 | Feitico IV | 11 | 17.0 | ~~DNF~~ | ~~18.0~~ | 10 | 16.0 | 10 | 16.0 | 10 | 16.0 | DNF | 18.0 | 10 | 16.0 | 117.0 | 99.0 |

Legend: DNF – Did not finish; DNS – Did not start; DSQ – Disqualified;
Discard is crossed out and does not count for the overall result.

- 1977 Progress

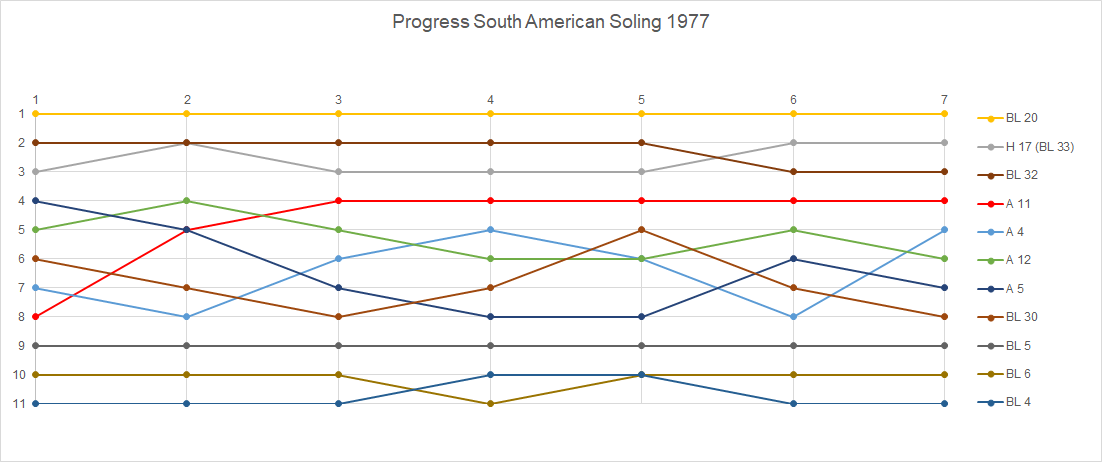

== 1978 Final results ==
Only ranking and venue but no detailed results are documented.

1978
Event title
- Edition: 8,
- Host: Yacht Club Argentino

Event details
- Venue: Buenos Aires, Argentina
- Yachts: 14

Competitors
- Competitors: 42
- Competing nations: 2

Results
- (gold) Gold: Brazil; Fernando Nabuco; Crew not documented
- (silver) Silver: Argentina; Pedro Ferrero; Crew not documented
- (bronze) Bronze: Argentina; A. Zucolli; Crew not documented

Only ranking and total no detailed results are documented.

| Rank | Country | Sailnumber | Boatname | Helmsman | Total – discard |
|---|---|---|---|---|---|
| 1st place, gold medalist(s) | Brazil | BL 32 | Quati | Fernando Nabuco | 20.0 |
| 2nd place, silver medalist(s) | Argentina | A 10 | Ñuma | Pedro Ferrero | 24.4 |
| 3rd place, bronze medalist(s) | Argentina | A 7 | Doña Estela | A. Zucolli | 33.4 |
| 4 | Argentina | A 3 | Rumor | C. Fassardi | 37.4 |
| 5 | Argentina | A 5 | Huija | J.D. Vago | 40.7 |
| 6 | Argentina | A 22 | Pamperito | G. Castro | 43.7 |
| 7 | Argentina | A 12 | Orzando | Santiago Lange | 43.7 |
| 8 | Argentina | A 11 | Tabu II | J. Pavia | 53.4 |
| 9 | Brazil | BL 30 | Osprey XIV | Ernesto Reibel | 67.0 |
| 10 | Argentina | A 6 | Gotan | C. D'Onofrio | 80.0 |
| 11 | Argentina | A 24 | Alerta | J. Soneyra | 81.0 |
| 12 | Argentina | A 1 | Mefalda | J. Melli | 86.0 |
| 13 | Argentina | A 19 | Revolution | G. San Martin | 102.0 |
| 14 | Argentina | A 3' | NN | P. Agrest | 105.0 |

== 1979 Final results ==
Only the top three helmsman and venue are documented.

1979
Event title
- Edition: 9

Event details
- Venue: Rio de Janeiro, Brazil

Results
- (gold) Gold: Brazil BL 59; Vicente Brun; Crew not documented
- (silver) Silver: Argentina; Pedro Ferrero; Crew not documented
- (bronze) Bronze: Brazil; A. Zucolli; Crew not documented

== 1980 Final results ==
Only the top 3 and a major incident are documented.

1980
Event title
- Edition: 10
- Host: Yacht Club Argentino

Event details
- Venue: Rio de la Plata, Argentina
- Dates: 14–23 November
- Opening ceremony: 16 November

Results
- (gold) Gold: United States; Jim Coggan; Argentina; Pedro Ferrero; Argentina; Alberto Llorens
- (silver) Silver: Argentina; Claudio Fassardi; Jose Atencio; Miguel Fisher
- (bronze) Bronze: Argentina; Ricardo Boneo; Santiago Austin; Pablo Campos

In race 4 on Friday 21 two boats sunk due to winds over 60 km/h and rough waters. The team of helmsman Dave Perry on STORM KING were saved. One crew member of INDIO of helmsman Juan Carlos Soneyra got entangled in the forestay. In spite of the great efforts of his team he could not be released and drowned. No race was sailed on Saturday 22. The 5th and final race was sailed on Sunday 23.

| Rank | Country | Helmsman | Crew | Sail No | Boat name | Total |
|---|---|---|---|---|---|---|
| 1st place, gold medalist(s) | USA | Jim Coggan | Pedro Ferrero Argentina; Alberto Lloren Argentina | US 695 | Whip | 0.0 |
| 2nd place, silver medalist(s) | ARG | Claudio Fassardi | Jose Atencio; Miguel Fisher | A 3 | Rumor | 19.4 |
| 3rd place, bronze medalist(s) | ARG | Ricardo Boneo | Santiago Austin; Pablo Campos | A 15 | Pampa | 19.7 |

== 1981 Final results ==
1981
Event title
- Edition: 11 Not Sailed

== 1982 Final results ==
1982
Event title
- Edition: 12 Not Sailed

== 1983 Final results ==
1983
Event title
- Edition: 13

Event details
- Venue: Rio de Janeiro, Brazil
- Dates: January 1983
- Yachts: 13

Competitors
- Competitors: 39
- Competing nations: 2

Results
- (gold) Gold: Brazil; Torben Grael; Daniel Adler; Ronaldo Senfft
- (silver) Silver: Brazil; Augusto Barrozo; A.A. Guarischi; R. Kaufmann
- (bronze) Bronze: Brazil; Reinaldo Conrad; C. Bieckard; C. Rittscher

| Rank | Country | Helmsman | Crew | Sail No. | Race 1 | | Race 2 | | Race 3 | | Race 4 | | Race 5 | | Race 6 | | Total | Total – discard |
| Rank | Country | Helmsman | Crew | Sail No. | Pos. | Pts. | Pos. | Pts. | Pos. | Pts. | Pos. | Pts. | Pos. | Pts. | Pos. | Pts. | Total | Total – discard |
| 1st place, gold medalist(s) | BRA | Torben Grael | Daniel Adler; Ronaldo Senfft | BL 45 | ~~1~~ | ~~0.0~~ | 1 | 0.0 | 1 | 0.0 | 1 | 0.0 | 1 | 0.0 | 1 | 0.0 | 0.0 | 0.0 |
| 2nd place, silver medalist(s) | BRA | Augusto Barrozo | A.A. Guarischi; R. Kaufmann | BL 40 | 3 | 5.7 | 2 | 3.0 | ~~5~~ | ~~10.0~~ | 3 | 5.7 | 2 | 3.0 | 2 | 3.0 | 30.4 | 20.4 |
| 3rd place, bronze medalist(s) | BRA | Reinaldo Conrad | C. Bieckard; C. Rittscher | BL 28 | 2 | 3.0 | 3 | 5.7 | 2 | 3.0 | ~~5~~ | ~~10.0~~ | 4 | 8.0 | 5 | 10.0 | 39.7 | 29.7 |
| 4 | BRA | José Paulo Dias | Nelson Falcão; José Augusto Dias | BL 34 | ~~5~~ | ~~10.0~~ | 4 | 8.0 | 3 | 5.7 | 2 | 3.0 | 5 | 10.0 | 3 | 5.7 | 42.4 | 32.4 |
| 5 | USA | Buddy Melges | Hans Melges; Robert Penticoff | US 757 | 4 | 8.0 | ~~13~~ | ~~19.0~~ | 4 | 8.0 | 4 | 8.0 | 3 | 5.7 | 6 | 11.7 | 60.4 | 41.4 |
| 6 | BRA | Antonio Figueiredo | F. Bonini; Nicholaus Specht | BL 33 | ~~6~~ | ~~11.7~~ | 5 | 10.0 | 6 | 11.7 | 6 | 11.7 | 6 | 11.7 | 4 | 8.0 | 64.8 | 53.1 |
| 7 | BRA | Arnaldo Tito Caldas | Robert Swan; Axel Schmidt | BL 15 | ~~8~~ | ~~14.0~~ | 7 | 13.0 | 7 | 13.0 | 8 | 14.0 | 7 | 13.0 | 7 | 13.0 | 80.0 | 66.0 |
| 8 | BRA | Clovis Pupepi | H. Thielemann; Al Ferpaz | BL 32 | ~~9~~ | ~~15.0~~ | 6 | 11.7 | 8 | 14.0 | 7 | 13.0 | 8 | 14.0 | 9 | 15.0 | 82.7 | 67.7 |
| 9 | BRA | Roberto Tacao | Carlos Snaches; Joao Souto | BL 5 | 7 | 13.0 | 9 | 15.0 | 9 | 15.0 | 9 | 15.0 | ~~10~~ | ~~16.0~~ | 8 | 14.0 | 88.0 | 72.0 |
| 10 | BRA | Luiz Felipe Pereira | C. Freitas; Ricardo Freitas | BL 35 | 10 | 16.0 | 8 | 14.0 | 11 | 17.0 | ~~13~~ | ~~19.0~~ | 9 | 15.0 | 13 | 19.0 | 100.0 | 81.0 |
| 11 | BRA | Nonato Coutinho | C. Lisboa; Carlos Vasconcelos | BL 18 | ~~12~~ | ~~18.0~~ | 11 | 17.0 | 10 | 16.0 | 11 | 17.0 | 11 | 17.0 | 10 | 16.0 | 101.0 | 83.0 |
| 12 | BRA | Ronald Costa Souza | Alvarc Souza; Csmar Souza | BL 29 | 11 | 17.0 | 10 | 16.0 | 12 | 18.0 | 12 | 18.0 | ~~13~~ | ~~19.0~~ | 11 | 17.0 | 105.0 | 86.0 |
| 13 | BRA | Marcio Razuh | Lucio Pinto; Karin Harison | BL 4 | ~~13~~ | ~~19.0~~ | 12 | 18.0 | 13 | 19.0 | 10 | 16.0 | 12 | 18.0 | 12 | 18.0 | 108.0 | 89.0 |

Legend: DNF – Did not finish; DNS – Did not start; DSQ – Disqualified;
Discard is crossed out and does not count for the overall result.

- 1983 Progress

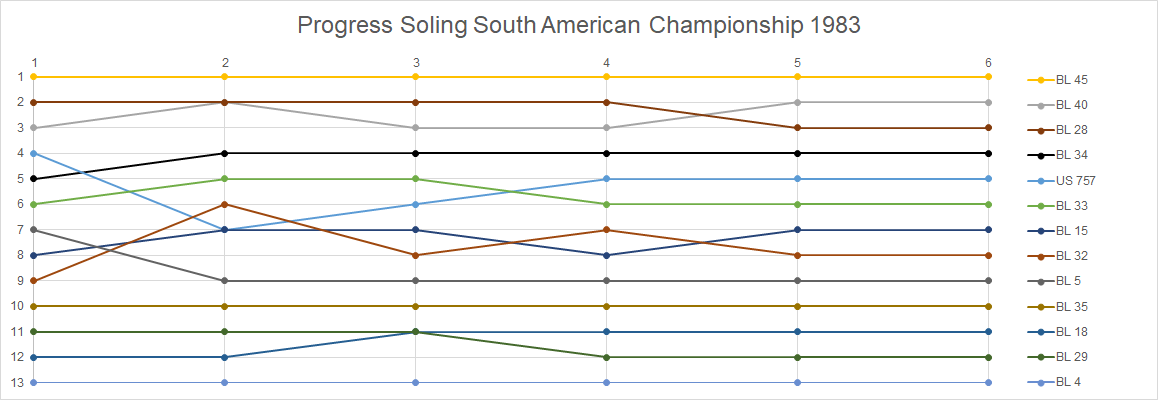

== 1984 Final results ==
Only the winning helmsman and venue are documented.

1984
Event title
- Edition: 14

Event details
- Venue: Buenos Aires, Argentina

Results
- (gold) Gold: Brazil BL 40; Augusto Barrozo; Crew not documented
- (silver) Silver: Not documented
- (bronze) Bronze: Not documented

== 1985 Final results ==
Only the winning helmsman and venue are documented.

1985
Event title
- Edition: 15

Event details
- Venue: Buenos Aires, Argentina

Results
- (gold) Gold: Argentina A 15; Horatio Pettamenti; Crew not documented
- (silver) Silver: Not documented
- (bronze) Bronze: Not documented

== 1986 Final results ==
Only the winning helmsman and venue are documented.

1986
Event title
- Edition: 16

Event details
- Venue: Punta del Este, Uruguay

Results
- (gold) Gold: Brazil; Torben Grael; Crew not documented
- (silver) Silver: Not documented
- (bronze) Bronze: Not documented

== 1987 Final results ==
Only ranking of the first five boats, helmsman and venue are documented.

1987
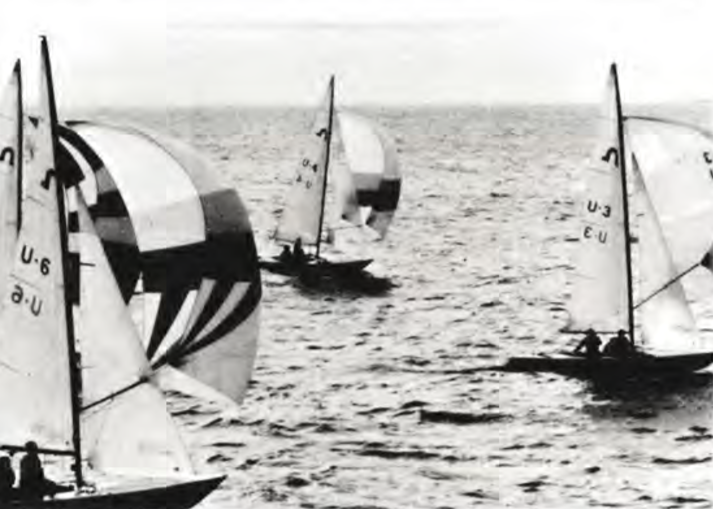

Event title
- Edition: 17

Event details
- Venue: Punta del Este, Uruguay
- Yachts: 9

Competitors
- Competitors: 27
- Competing nations: 3

Results
- (gold) Gold: Brazil; Augusto Barrozo; Crew not documented
- (silver) Silver: Argentina; Guillermo Castro; Crew not documented
- (bronze) Bronze: Uruguay; Bernd Knuppel; Crew not documented

| Rank | Country | Sailnumber | Helmsman |
|---|---|---|---|
| 1st place, gold medalist(s) | Brazil | BL 40 | Augusto Barrozo |
| 2nd place, silver medalist(s) | Argentina | A 6 | Guillermo Castro |
| 3rd place, bronze medalist(s) | Uruguay | U 4 | Bernd Knuppel |
| 4 | Argentina | A 658 | Pedro Ferrero |
| 5 | Uruguay | U 1 | Horatio Garcia |
| 6 | Argentina | A 15 | Ricardo Boneo |
| 7 | Uruguay | U 3 | Daniel Casariego |
| 8 | Uruguay | U 6 | Gustavo Rana |
| 9 | Uruguay | U 2 | Alvaro Aldecosea |

== 1988 Final results ==
1988
Event title
- Edition: 18 Not sailed

== 1989 Final results ==
1989
Event title
- Edition: 19 Not sailed

== 1990 Final results ==
1990
Event title
- Edition: 20

Event details
- Venue: Armação dos Búzios, Brazil
- Dates: January 1990
- Yachts: 7

Competitors
- Competitors: 21
- Competing nations: 1

Results
- (gold) Gold: Brazil; Jose Paulo Dias; Daniel Adler; N. Palcão
- (silver) Silver: Brazil; Reinaldo Conrad; Ralph Conrad; Roberto Skuplik
- (bronze) Bronze: Brazil; J. King; L. Carlos F. Simão; D. Wilcox

| Rank | Country | Helmsman | Crew | Sail No. | Race 1 | | Race 2 | | Race 3 | | Race 4 | | Race 5 | | Race 6 | | Total | Total – discard |
| Rank | Country | Helmsman | Crew | Sail No. | Pos. | Pts. | Pos. | Pts. | Pos. | Pts. | Pos. | Pts. | Pos. | Pts. | Pos. | Pts. | Total | Total – discard |
| 1st place, gold medalist(s) | BRA | Jose Paulo Dias | Daniel Adler; N. Palcão | BL 45 | 1 | 0.0 | ~~4~~ | ~~8.0~~ | 3 | 5.7 | 1 | 0.0 | 2 | 3.0 | 3 | 5.7 | 22.4 | 14.4 |
| 2nd place, silver medalist(s) | BRA | Reinaldo Conrad | Ralph Conrad; Roberto Skuplik | BL 5 | ~~5~~ | ~~10.0~~ | 2 | 3.0 | 1 | 0.0 | 3 | 5.7 | 1 | 0.0 | 5 | 10.0 | 28.7 | 18.7 |
| 3rd place, bronze medalist(s) | BRA | J. King | L. Carlos F. Simão; D. Wilcox | BL 11 | 2 | 3.0 | 3 | 5.7 | ~~5~~ | ~~10.0~~ | 4 | 8.0 | 3 | 5.7 | 1 | 0.0 | 32.4 | 22.4 |
| 4 | BRA | Jorge Zariff | Ronaldo Senfft; Patrick Hallquist | BL 35 | ~~4~~ | ~~8.0~~ | 1 | 0.0 | 4 | 8.0 | 2 | 3.0 | 4 | 8.0 | 4 | 8.0 | 35.0 | 27.0 |
| 5 | BRA | Augusto Barrozo | S. Orapausky; Pedro Signorini | BL 40 | ~~7~~ | ~~13.0~~ | 6 | 11.7 | 2 | 3.0 | 5 | 10.0 | 5 | 10.0 | 2 | 3.0 | 50.7 | 37.7 |
| 6 | URU | H.C. Filho | H. Carabelli; L. Chiapparro | U 6 | 3 | 5.7 | 5 | 10.0 | 6 | 11.7 | ~~PMS~~ | ~~20.0~~ | 6 | 6.0 | 6 | 11.7 | 65.1 | 45.1 |
| 7 | BRA | P. Gerzon A. de Oliveira | B. Ostergran; A. Miuller | BL 451 | 6 | 11.7 | 7 | 13.0 | ~~DNF~~ | ~~20.0~~ | 6 | 11.7 | 7 | 13.0 | 7 | 13.0 | 82.4 | 62.4 |

Legend: DNF – Did not finish; DNS – Did not start; DSQ – Disqualified;
Discard is crossed out and does not count for the overall result.

- 1990 Progress

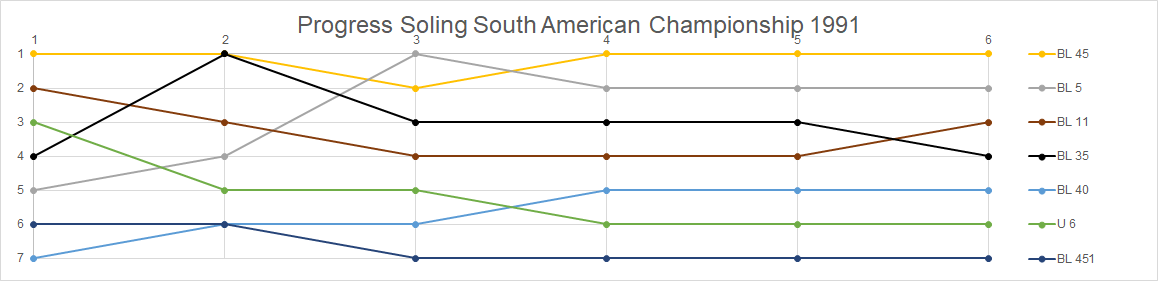

== Further results ==
For further results see:

- Soling South American Championship results (1971–90)
