= Soling European Championship results (2010–2014) =

Soling European Championships

Soling
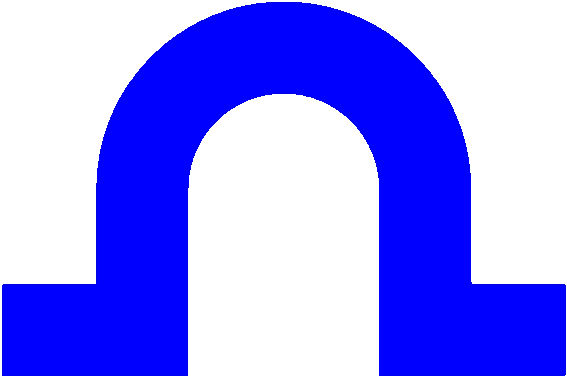

Development
- Name: Soling

The main article describes all European Soling Championships from one the first held in 1968 to the announced Championships in the near future. This article states the detailed results, where relevant the controversies, and the progression of the Championship during the series race by race of the European Soling Championships in the years 2010, 2011, 2012, 2013 and 2014. This is based on the major sources: World Sailing, the world governing body for the sport of sailing recognized by the IOC and the IPC, and the publications of the International Soling Association.

== 2010 Final results ==
2010
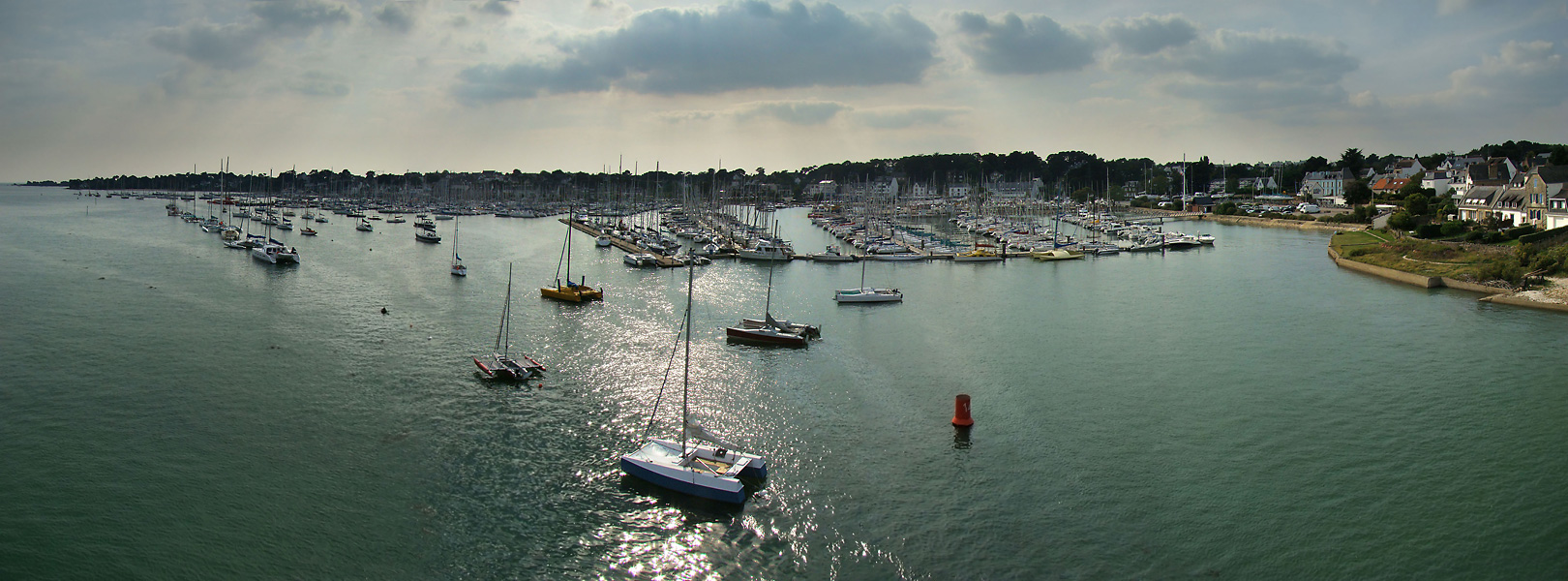

Event title
- Edition: 43
- Host: Société nautique de La Trinité-sur-Mer (SNT)

Event details
- Venue: La Trinité-sur-Mer, France
- Dates: 28 August-4 September 2010
- Yachts: 25
- Key people: Tony O'Gorman
- Opened by: Tony O'Gorman
- Opening ceremony: 30 August

Competitors
- Competitors: 75
- Competing nations: 11

Results
- (gold) Gold: Hungary; György Wossala; Károly Vezér; Pepe Németh
- (silver) Silver: Germany; Roman Koch; Maxl Koch; Gregor Bornemann
- (bronze) Bronze: Argentina; Gustavo Warburg; Hernan Celedoni; Maximo Smith

Rank	Country	Helmsman	Crew	Sail No.	Race 1		Race 2		Race 3		Race 4		Race 5		Race 6		Race 7		Race 8		Race 9		Total	Total – discard
Rank	Country	Helmsman	Crew	Sail No.	Pos.	Pts.	Pos.	Pts.	Pos.	Pts.	Pos.	Pts.	Pos.	Pts.	Pos.	Pts.	Pos.	Pts.	Pos.	Pts.	Pos.	Pts.	Total	Total – discard
1st place, gold medalist(s)	HUN	György Wossala	Károly Vezér; Pepe Németh	HUN 77	2	2	1	1	5	5	4	4	1	1	2	2	1	1	3	3	~~DNC~~	~~26~~	45	19
2nd place, silver medalist(s)	GER	Roman Koch	Maxl Koch; Gregor Bornemann	GER 300	4	4	~~6~~	~~6~~	3	3	3	3	4	4	3	3	3	3	4	4	1	1	31	25
3rd place, bronze medalist(s)	ARG	Gustavo Warburg	Hernan Celedoni; Maximo Smith	ARG 32	1	1	2	2	1	1	~~10~~	~~10~~	3	3	4	4	7	7	5	5	6	6	39	29
4	NED	Johan Offermans	Berend Vree; Ben Medendorp	NED 1	3	3	3	3	4	4	~~9~~	~~9~~	2	2	5	5	5	5	1	1	7	7	39	30
5	NED	Rudy den Outer	Gavin Lidlow; Ramzi Souli	NED 33	9	9	7	7	2	2	2	2	6	6	1	1	~~10~~	~~10~~	9	9	8	8	54	44
6	SLO	Bostjan Antoncic	Mitja Nevečny; Gennadi Strakh (BLR)	SLO 1	8	8	4	4	6	6	1	1	5	5	~~DNF~~	~~26~~	21	21	2	2	3	3	76	50
7	DEN	Frank Højlund Lavrsen	Jacob Andersen; Mogens Jørgensen	DEN 126	6	6	8	8	12	12	5	5	~~13~~	~~13~~	9	9	6	6	6	6	4	4	69	56
8	FRA	Hubert Lefevre	Henri Lefevre; Marc Lefevre	FRA 198	7	7	5	5	8	8	~~15.5~~	~~15.5~~	9	9	14	14	8	8	7	7	2	2	75.5	60
9	USA	Matias Collins	Eduardo Gibelli (ARG); Hans Lindner (AUT)	USA 853	~~12~~	~~12~~	10	10	9	9	6	6	12	12	7	7	4	4	10	10	9	9	79	67
10	GER	Thomas Scherer	Jorg Goletz; Andreas Baumüller	GER 292	5	5	~~13~~	~~13~~	10	10	17	17	10	10	6	6	12	12	8	8	10	10	91	74
11	USA	Charlie Kamps	Jon Bailey; Hans Meyer	USA 832	11	11	11	11	13	13	7	7	~~OCS~~	~~26~~	12	12	2	2	11	11	13	13	106	80
12	NED	Bram Soethoudt	Gabor Helmhout; Geert Verheij	NED 38	14	14	16	16	11	11	8	8	~~OCS~~	~~26~~	8	8	13	13	12	12	5	5	113	87
13	FRA	Yves Steff	Gerard Bruno; Yves Allain	FRA 182	~~17~~	~~17~~	12	12	7	7	11	11	7	7	16	16	15	15	16	16	12	12	113	96
14	AUT	Ludwig Beurle	Frank Eberhard; Ekkehart Steinhuber	AUT 102	10	10	9	9	17	17	13	13	8	8	11	11	~~23~~	~~23~~	13	13	16	16	120	97
15	ITA	Michele Tognozzi	Gonzaga de Bastida; Giuliano Carotti	ITA 251	19	19	15	15	14	14	18	18	11	11	10	10	~~22~~	~~22~~	18	18	11	11	138	116
16	FRA	Yves Jambu-Merlin	Francois Laborde; Laurence Laborde	FRA 188	13	13	~~18~~	~~18~~	15	15	15.5	15.5	14	14	13	13	18	18	14	14	17	17	137.5	119.5
17	NOR	Christian Jozan	Phillipe Jozan; Archer Yves	NOR 128	~~20~~	~~20~~	20	20	18	18	14	14	17	17	18	18	9	9	19	19	15	15	150	130
18	FRA	Pierre Montecot	Pierre Coudron de Coquereaumont; Benoit Montecot	FRA 201	15	15	14	14	20	20	12	12	~~OCS~~	~~26~~	19	19	17	17	21	21	14	14	158	132
19	FRA	Hervé Godest	Pascal Martinet	FRA 181	18	18	~~23~~	~~23~~	16	16	19	19	18	18	15	15	14	14	17	17	18	18	158	135
20	FRA	Nicolas Pecha	Driss Nayl; Florian De Saint Pries	FRA 196	16	16	19	19	19	19	22	22	16	16	~~20~~	~~20~~	16	16	15	15	19	19	162	140
21	FRA	Jacques Montecot	Clement Freour; Emiliano Ingrassia	FRA 47	~~24~~	~~24~~	17	17	23	23	21	21	22	22	22	22	11	11	20	20	21	21	181	157
22	FRA	Patrick Godest	Claude Legond; Francis Legond	FRA 172	21	21	22	22	24	24	~~DNC~~	~~26~~	21	21	21	21	19	19	24	24	20	20	198	172
23	FRA	Vincent Manach	François-Xavier Denis; Charles Andre Rousseau	FRA 147	~~DNC~~	~~26~~	DNC	26	DNC	26	20	20	15	15	17	17	24	24	22	22	23	23	199	173
24	FRA	Phillipe Montecot	Marc Moreau; Dominique Poirrier	FRA 199	~~23~~	~~23~~	21	21	21	21	23	23	20	20	23	23	20	20	23	23	22	22	196	173
25	FRA	François Gombeaud	Jean Marc Broudin; Louis Etienne Du Reau	FRA 151	22	22	24	24	22	22	24	24	19	19	24	24	~~25~~	~~25~~	25	25	24	24	209	184

Legend: DNC – Did not come to the starting area; DNF – Did not finish; OCS – On the course side of the starting line;
Discard is crossed out and does not count for the overall result.

- 2010 Progress

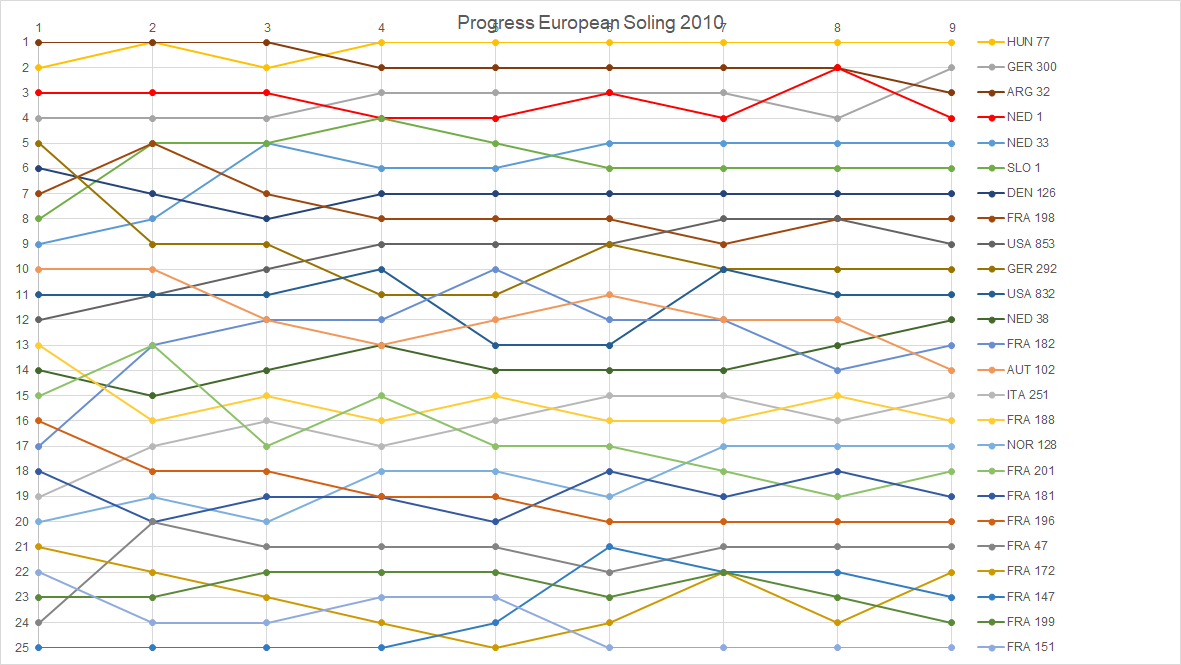

== 2011 Final results ==
2011
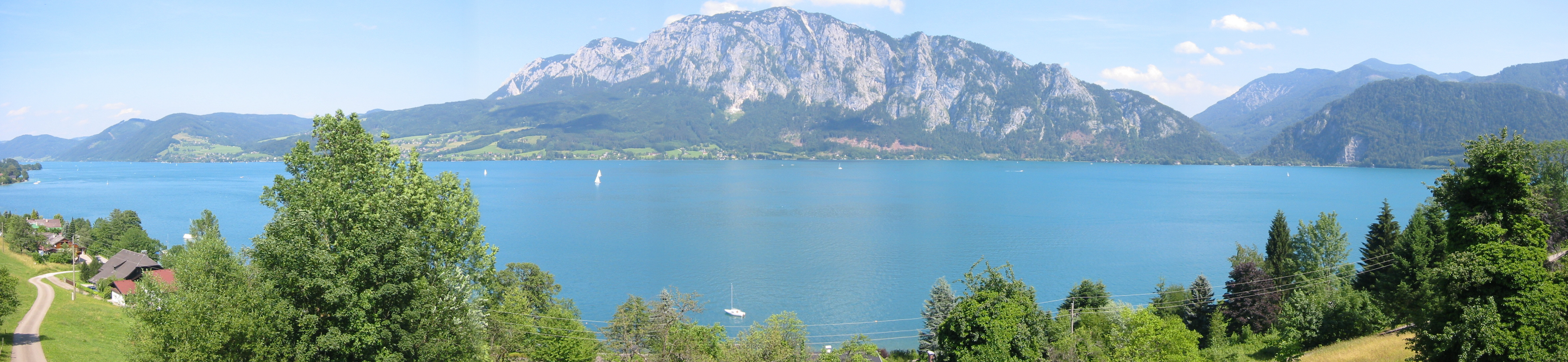

Event title
- Edition: 44
- Host: Union Yacht Club Attersee

Event details
- Venue: Lake Attersee, Austria
- Dates: 27 August – 4 September 2011
- Yachts: 32
- Opening ceremony: 27 August

Competitors
- Competitors: 96
- Competing nations: 9

Results
- (gold) Gold: Germany; Uwe Steingroß; Karsten Eller; Tim Giesecke
- (silver) Silver: United States; Stuart H. Walker; Georg Stadler (AUT); Johannes Zopf (AUT)
- (bronze) Bronze: Austria; Johann Kalhs; Christian Kalhs; Ronnie Zeiller

Rank	Country	Helmsman	Crew	Sail No.	Race 1		Race 2		Race 3		Race 4		Race 5		Total
Rank	Country	Helmsman	Crew	Sail No.	Pos.	Pts.	Pos.	Pts.	Pos.	Pts.	Pos.	Pts.	Pos.	Pts.	Total
1st place, gold medalist(s)	GER	Uwe Steingroß	Karsten Eller; Tim Giesecke	GER 323	4	4	6	6	6	6	5	5	3	3	24
2nd place, silver medalist(s)	USA	Stuart H. Walker	Georg Stadler (AUT); Johannes Zopf (AUT)	USA 839	3	3	4	4	5	5	10	10	7	7	29
3rd place, bronze medalist(s)	AUT	Johann Kalhs	Christian Kalhs; Ronnie Zeiller	AUT 136	10	10	1	1	14	14	3	3	10	10	38
4	GER	Karl Haist	Max Haist; Simon Haist	GER 308	9	9	12	12	1	1	17	17	1	1	40
5	ITA	Michael Dietzel	Dieter Meusinger; Anna Dietzel	ITA 198	8	8	10	10	3	3	8	8	13	13	42
6	AUT	Carl Auteried Jr.	Thomas Auteried; Martin Kendler	AUT 117	6	6	14	14	12	12	6	6	4	4	42
7	AUT	Andreas Moosgassner	Georg Schoeffetter; Phillip Bostnay	AUT 101	11	11	2	2	11	11	9	9	15	15	48
8	AUT	Ludwig Beurle	Hermann Beurle; Ekkehart Steinhuber	AUT 102	21	21	5	5	8	8	11	11	16	16	61
9	USA	Charlie Kamps	Jeremy McMahon; Hans Meyer	USA 832	7	7	9	9	18	18	20	20	9	9	63
10	GER	Gernot Heller	Maxy Koch; Valentin Koch	GER 312	25	25	19	19	2	2	7	7	12	12	65
11	GER	Heino von Schuckmann	Dominik Meissner; Markus Stallhofer	GER 318	13	13	20	20	4	4	21	21	8	8	66
12	GER	Thomas Scherer	Jorg Goletz; Andreas Baumüller	GER 292	17	17	8	8	9	9	22	22	11	11	67
13	GER	Roman Koch	Maxl Koch; Gregor Bornemann	GER 1	1	1	3	3	15	15	28	28	24	24	71
14	USA	Matias Collins	Leonardo Cunha; Lili Meissner	USA 853	12	12	22	22	31	31	1	1	6	6	72
15	GER	Daniel Diesing	Jorg Sonntag; Sven Rikwald	GER 209	2	2	16	16	25	25	15	15	14	14	72
16	AUT	Harald Schuh	Stephan Puxkandl; Stephan Beurle	AUT 97	18	18	21	21	16	16	2	2	20	20	77
17	GER	Holger Weichert	Laurent Scheel; Martin Setzkorn	GER 49	5	5	7	7	10	10	DSQ	33	22	22	77
18	HUN	Istvan Szucs	Gabor Gyulai; Peter Szucs	HUN 17	20	20	31	31	26	26	4	4	5	5	86
19	GER	Christian Mack	Thomas Fabry; Korbinian Löbmann	GER 249	23	23	13	13	7	7	18	18	26	26	87
20	SLO	Bostjan Antoncic	Mitja Nevecny; Gennadi Strakh (ARG)	SLO 1	22	22	11	11	24	24	13	13	25	25	95
21	AUT	Otto Urbanek	Felix Hasch; Oskar Hasch	AUT 107	16	16	25	25	21	21	12	12	21	21	95
22	AUT	Alex Hasch	Christian Holler; Bernhard Kreutzer	AUT 127	14	14	23	23	DSQ	33	26	26	2	2	98
23	AUT	Peter Neumann	Rudolf Hubauer; Rudolf Rager	AUT 122	19	19	18	18	23	23	23	23	18	18	101
24	AUT	Peter Schaup	Heino Risch; Walter Haschka	AUT 130	29	29	26	26	13	13	16	16	23	23	107
25	GER	Susanne Retzlaff-Steingross	Eberhard Frank; Johann Lindner	GER 300	DSQ	33	15	15	17	17	25	25	17	17	107
26	GER	Emil Kuchta	Andreas Hamacher; Susanne Kuchta	GER 243	28	28	17	17	19	19	19	19	28	28	111
27	GER	Stefan Barie	Dieter Lewin; Frank Gundlach	GER 313	27	27	29	29	22	22	14	14	30	30	122
28	FRA	Marc Lefevre	Louis-Etienne du Reau; François Gombeaud	FRA 198	26	26	24	24	29	29	29	29	19	19	127
29	DEN	Frank Højlund Lavrsen	Lars From; Mogens Jørgensen	DEN 126	15	15	27	27	20	20	DNC	33	DNC	33	128
30	ESP	Francisco Villa	Alfredo Buqueras; Alejandro Albatico	ESP 146	24	24	28	28	28	28	27	27	29	29	136
31	HUN	Pál Sebes	Gergely Buza; Márton Sebes	HUN 23	31	31	30	30	27	27	30	30	27	27	145
32	AUT	Karl Gebetsroither	Klaus Gebetsroither; Bernd Offenberger	AUT 138	30	30	32	32	30	30	24	24	31	31	147

Legend: DNC – Did not come to the starting area; DSQ – Disqualified;
Discard is crossed out and does not count for the overall result.

- 2011 Progress

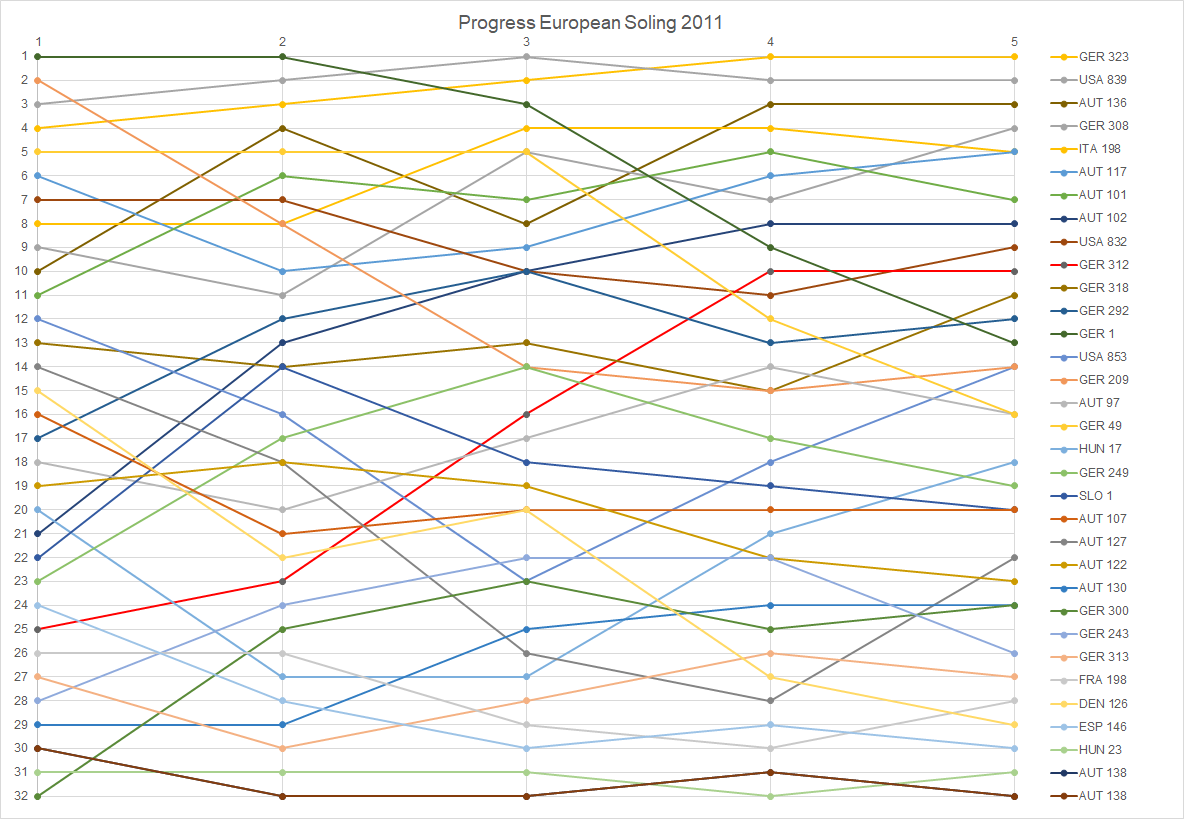

== 2012 Final results ==
=== Controversion ===
The Championship rules of the Soling class specifies that continental championships shall be open to all Countries. The Europeans know two major trophies:

- The SOLING-CUP
- The Swedish Soling Association's Perpetual Prize

The deed's of gift of both trophies specifies that the prize will be handed to the annual winner of the European Champion. In the history of the European Championship there were earlier NON-European winners since the Open character of the event. In each case the trophies were handed out the winners of those Championships conform the deed's of gift.
Unfortunately the race committee made in 2012 the mistake to hand out the "Swedish Soling Association’s Perpetual Prize", as result of the fact that the deed of gift was lost, to the first European team. As result the names of Karl Haist, Martin Zeileis and Patrick Wichmann were engraved on the trophy.

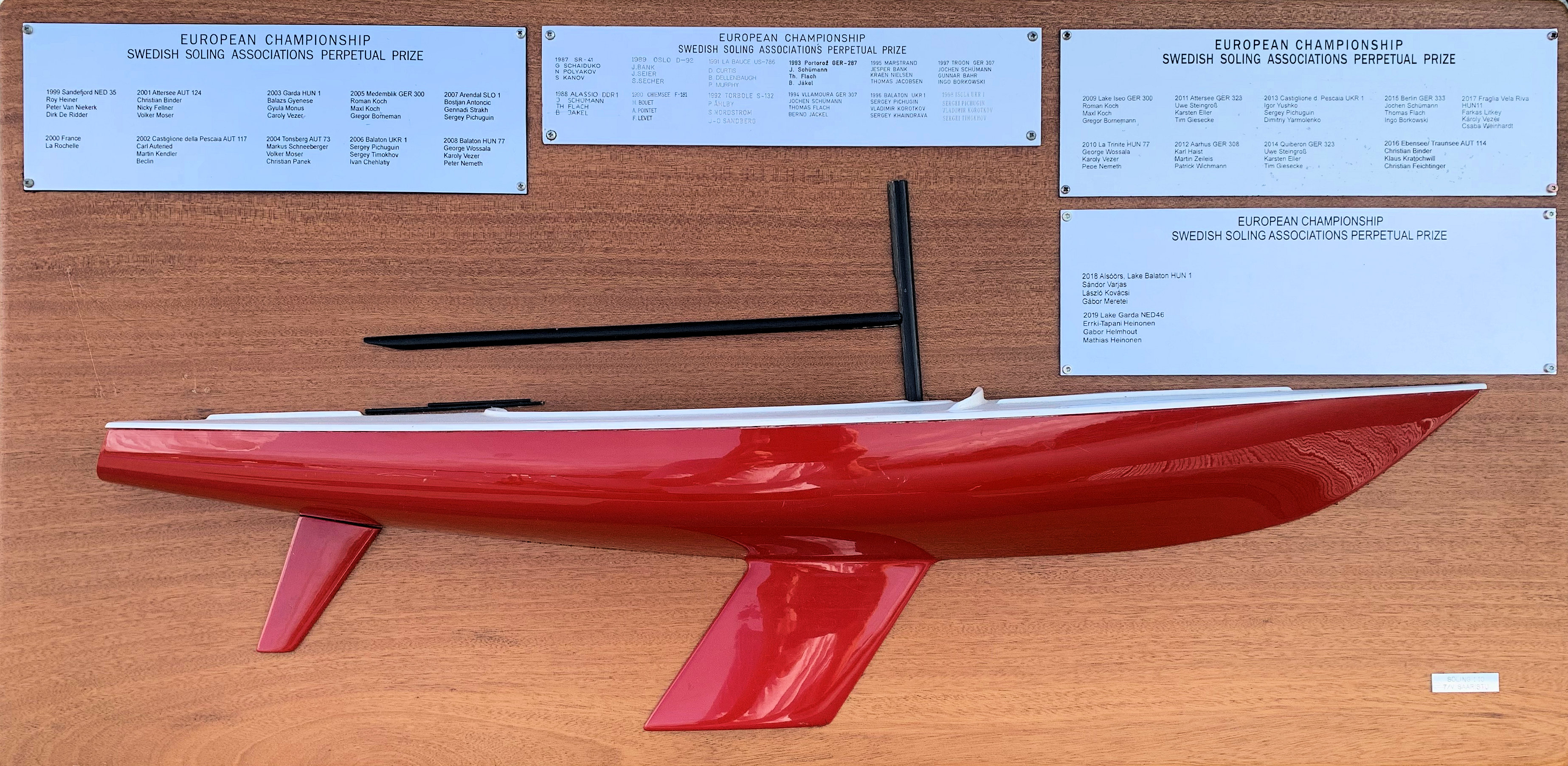
The Swedish Soling Association's Perpetual Prize in 1987 made and donated by Valter Saaristu to the winner of the European Championship is the other perpetual trophy for the winning team of the Soling European Championship. Winners engraved on the back board.

Later after scanning of the paper archive of former secretary Dinny Read the deed of gift emerged.

After this incident a new trophy was introduced in case there is a NON-European, European Champion. This perpetual "Best European Team Trophy" will be handed out to the first ranked team where all team members have a European nationality based on the geological definition of Europe. Their names will be engraved on the backplane of this new trophy. Sofar (16 February 2022) this trophy is not used.

2012
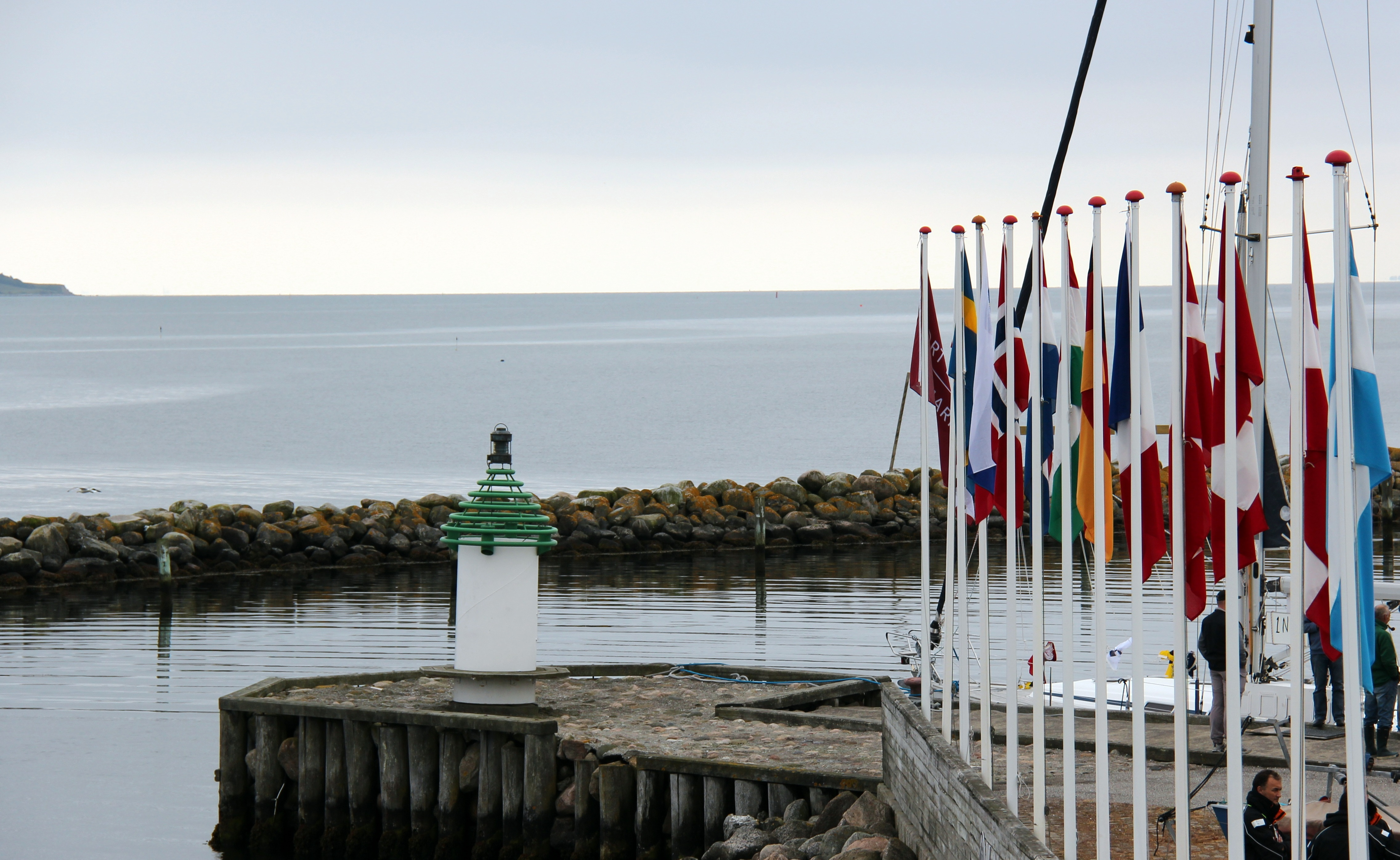

Event title
- Edition: 45
- Host: Kaløvig Sailing Centre

Event details
- Venue: Aarhus, Denmark
- Dates: 9 – 15 June
- Yachts: 33
- Key people: Frank Højlund Lavrsen
- Opening ceremony: 9 June

Competitors
- Competitors: 99
- Competing nations: 12

Results
- (gold) Gold: Argentina; Gustavo Warburg; Rodrigo Ferres; Miguel Lacour
- (silver) Silver: Germany; Karl Haist; Martin Zeileis; Patrick Wichmann
- (bronze) Bronze: Netherlands; Rudy den Outer; Gavin Lidlow; Ramzi Souli

Rank	Country	Helmsman	Crew	Sail No.	Race 1		Race 2		Race 3		Race 4		Race 5		Race 6		Race 7		Race 8		Race 9		Total	Total – discard
Rank	Country	Helmsman	Crew	Sail No.	Pos.	Pts.	Pos.	Pts.	Pos.	Pts.	Pos.	Pts.	Pos.	Pts.	Pos.	Pts.	Pos.	Pts.	Pos.	Pts.	Pos.	Pts.	Total	Total – discard
1st place, gold medalist(s)	ARG	Gustavo Warburg	Rodrigo Ferres; Miguel Lacour	ARG 37	4	4	2	2	6	6	1	1	2	2	3	3	3	3	8	8	~~DNC~~	~~34~~	63	29
2nd place, silver medalist(s)	GER	Karl Haist	Patrick Wichmann; Martin Zeileis (AUT)	GER 308	11	11	1	1	9	9	13	13	~~18~~	~~18~~	7	7	6	6	1	1	4	4	70	52
3rd place, bronze medalist(s)	NED	Rudy den Outer	Gavin Lidlow; Ramzi Souli	NED 33	5	5	5	5	3	3	7	7	4	4	11	11	7	7	~~12~~	~~12~~	11	11	65	53
4	GER	Uwe Steingroß	Karsten Eller; Tim Giesecke	GER 323	8	8	11	11	5	5	4	4	~~DNF~~	~~34~~	15	15	9	9	2	2	1	1	89	55
5	SLO	Bostjan Antoncic	Mitja Nevecny; Gennadi Strakh (BLR)	SLO 1	1	1	~~19~~	~~19~~	7	7	10	10	8	8	12	12	4	4	5	5	8	8	74	55
6	GER	Thomas Maschkiwitz	Stefan Wenzel; Christoph Wossala	GER 304	16	16	15	15	2	2	18	18	3	3	~~19~~	~~19~~	1	1	3	3	3	3	80	61
7	USA	Charlie Kamps	Jeremy McMahon; Hans Meyer	USA 832	17	17	4	4	8	8	6	6	13	13	9	9	11	11	~~19~~	~~19~~	6	6	93	74
8	GER	Roman Koch	Maxl Koch; Gregor Bornemann	GER 1	15	15	16	16	4	4	3	3	11	11	1	1	10	10	~~17~~	~~17~~	15	15	92	75
9	HUN	György Wossala	Pepe Németh; Richard Ludwig	HUN 77	9	9	~~26~~	~~26~~	1	1	9	9	1	1	24	24	8	8	11	11	14	14	103	77
10	CAN	Peter Hall	Will Hall; Berend Vree (NED)	CAN 225	2	2	~~20~~	~~20~~	17	17	2	2	16	16	17	17	2	2	16	16	7	7	99	79
11	DEN	Mogens Jørgensen	Kim Jørgensen; Allan Hoist Sorensen	DEN 1	12	12	6	6	15	15	5	5	~~19~~	~~19~~	6	6	16	16	15	15	5	5	99	80
12	ARG	Santiago Nottebohm	Pablo Araujo de Resende; Lucas Tumulty	ARG 38	3	3	~~23~~	~~23~~	14	14	12	12	20	20	4	4	5	5	9	9	17	17	107	84
13	NED	Johan Offermans	Wick Hillige; Mark Roth	NED 1	19	19	~~25~~	~~25~~	10	10	20	20	12	12	2	2	18	18	10	10	2	2	118	93
14	NOR	Lars Ingeberg	Frode Kirkedam; Alf Larsen	NOR 147	25	25	12	12	12	12	14	14	7	7	5	5	13	13	7	7	~~OCS~~	~~34~~	129	95
15	GER	Heino von Schuckmann	Dominik Meissner; Markus Stallhofer	GER 318	6	6	7	7	16	16	17	17	5	5	21	21	~~DSQ~~	~~34~~	13	13	12	12	131	97
16	GER	Thomas Scherer	Jens Thomas; Andreas Baumüller	GER 292	14	14	3	3	18	18	16	16	10	10	~~DNE~~	~~34~~	12	12	4	4	10	10	121	87
17	DEN	Frank Højlund Lavrsen	Jann Neergard; Jacob Andersen	DEN 126	10	10	14	14	13	13	11	11	17	17	~~18~~	~~18~~	15	15	6	6	18	18	122	104
18	GER	Holger Weichert	Laurent Scheel; Martin Setzkorn	GER 49	13	13	18	18	11	11	15	15	6	6	20	20	20	20	~~25~~	~~25~~	9	9	137	112
19	AUT	Ludwig Beurle	Eberhard Franke; Ekkehart Steinhuber	AUT 102	7	7	9	9	~~21~~	~~21~~	21	21	15	15	13	13	14	14	20	20	20	20	140	119
20	GER	Michael Dietzel	Dieter Meusinger; Henrik Frankmann	GER 320	20	20	8	8	25	25	8	8	21	21	~~DNC~~	~~34~~	17	17	14	14	13	13	160	126
21	FRA	Yves Steff	Yves Allain; Bruno Gerard	FRA 182	~~27~~	~~27~~	13	13	20	20	23	23	9	9	16	16	22	22	23	23	27	27	180	153
22	ARG	Agustin Nottebohm	Alejandro Culasso; Marcelo Schildknecht	ARG 28	21	21	~~OCS~~	~~34~~	19	19	25	25	14	14	14	14	24	24	26	26	22	22	199	165
23	NOR	Georgios Nikoltsis	Przemyslaw Goralski; Roar Skog	NOR 151	18	18	24	24	22	22	22	22	22	22	22	22	~~29~~	~~29~~	21	21	16	16	196	167
24	DEN	Ole Busbjerg	Bjarne Nielsen; Martin Klein	DEN 104	28	28	~~30~~	~~30~~	29	29	19	19	24	24	8	8	21	21	24	24	21	21	204	174
25	FRA	Marc Lefevre	Louis Etienne Du Reau; François Gombeaud	FRA 198	~~29~~	~~29~~	17	17	31	31	24	24	26	26	28	28	25	25	14	14	13	13	207	176
26	SWE	Anders Moberg	Patrik Marklund; Jonas Boström	SWE 229	23	23	21	21	26	26	~~30~~	~~30~~	27	27	23	23	19	19	27	27	19	19	215	185
27	SWE	Johan Berglund	Pontus Berglund; Martin Kjellberg	SWE 224	24	24	~~28~~	~~28~~	23	23	27	27	25	25	26	26	23	23	22	22	24	24	222	194
28	NOR	Frank Ormstad	Hans Petter Jostad; Bjørn Gulbrandsen	NOR 150	26	26	27	27	27	27	~~28~~	~~28~~	23	23	27	27	26	26	18	18	23	23	225	197
29	DEN	Jens Peter Understrup	Klaus Allerup; Jens Poulsen	DEN 127	22	22	22	22	24	24	26	26	~~DNC~~	~~34~~	25	25	27	27	28	28	25	25	233	199
30	GER	Emil Kuchta	Andreas Hamacher; Susanne Kuchta	GER 243	~~31~~	~~31~~	10	10	28	28	29	29	29	29	30	30	28	28	29	29	28	28	242	211
31	NOR	Frank Jense	Lars Hjorth; Morten Schmidt	NOR 132	30	30	~~DSQ~~	~~34~~	30	30	31	31	28	28	10	10	31	31	32	32	29	29	255	221
32	SWE	Göran Gellerhed	Pontus Malmberg; Lars Anrén	SWE 122	~~32~~	~~32~~	29	29	32	32	32	32	30	30	29	29	30	30	31	31	30	30	275	243
33	NOR	Rune Johansen	Tobias Hemdorff; Jens Petter Andresen	NOR 50	33	33	31	31	33	33	33	33	31	31	31	31	32	32	~~DNC~~	~~34~~	DNC	34	292	258

Legend: DNC – Did not come to the starting area; DNE – Non excludable disqualification; DNF – Did not finish; DSQ – Disqualified; OCS – On the course side of the starting line;
Discard is crossed out and does not count for the overall result.

- 2012 Progress

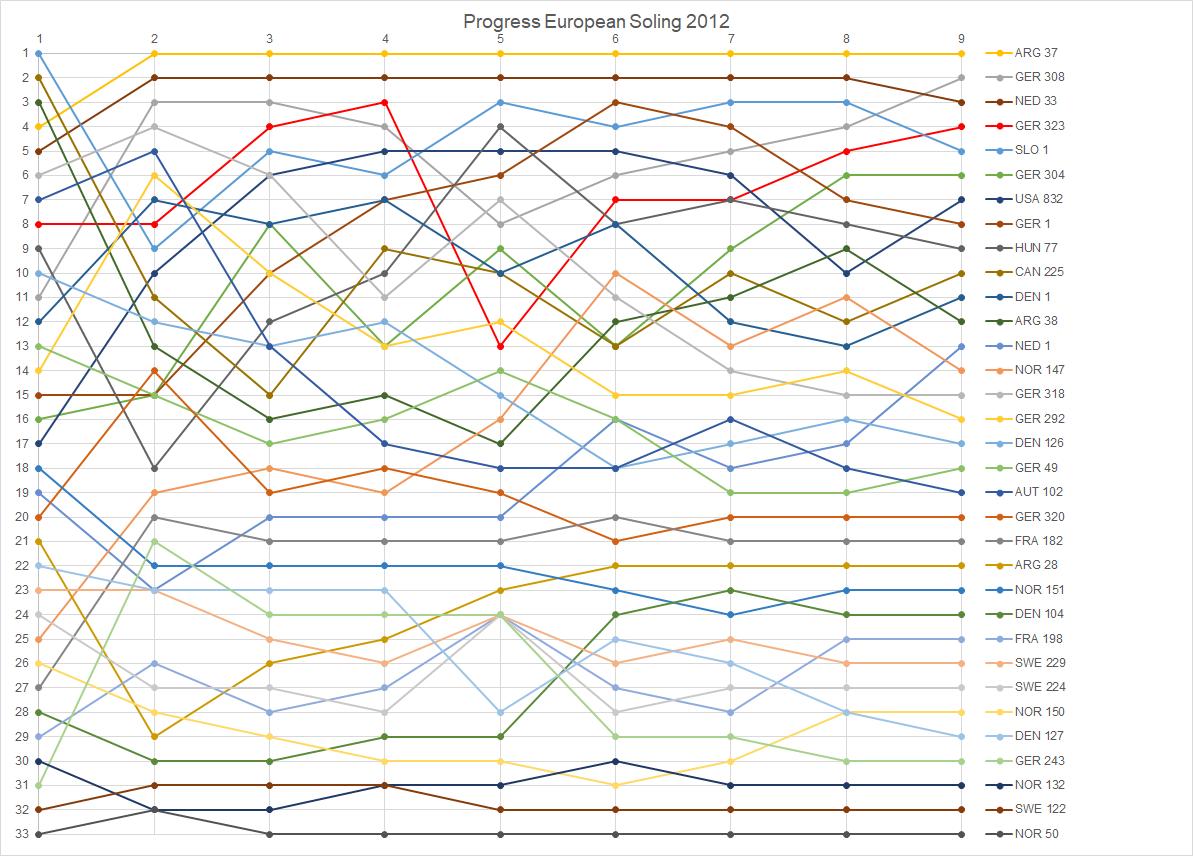

== 2013 Final results ==
2013
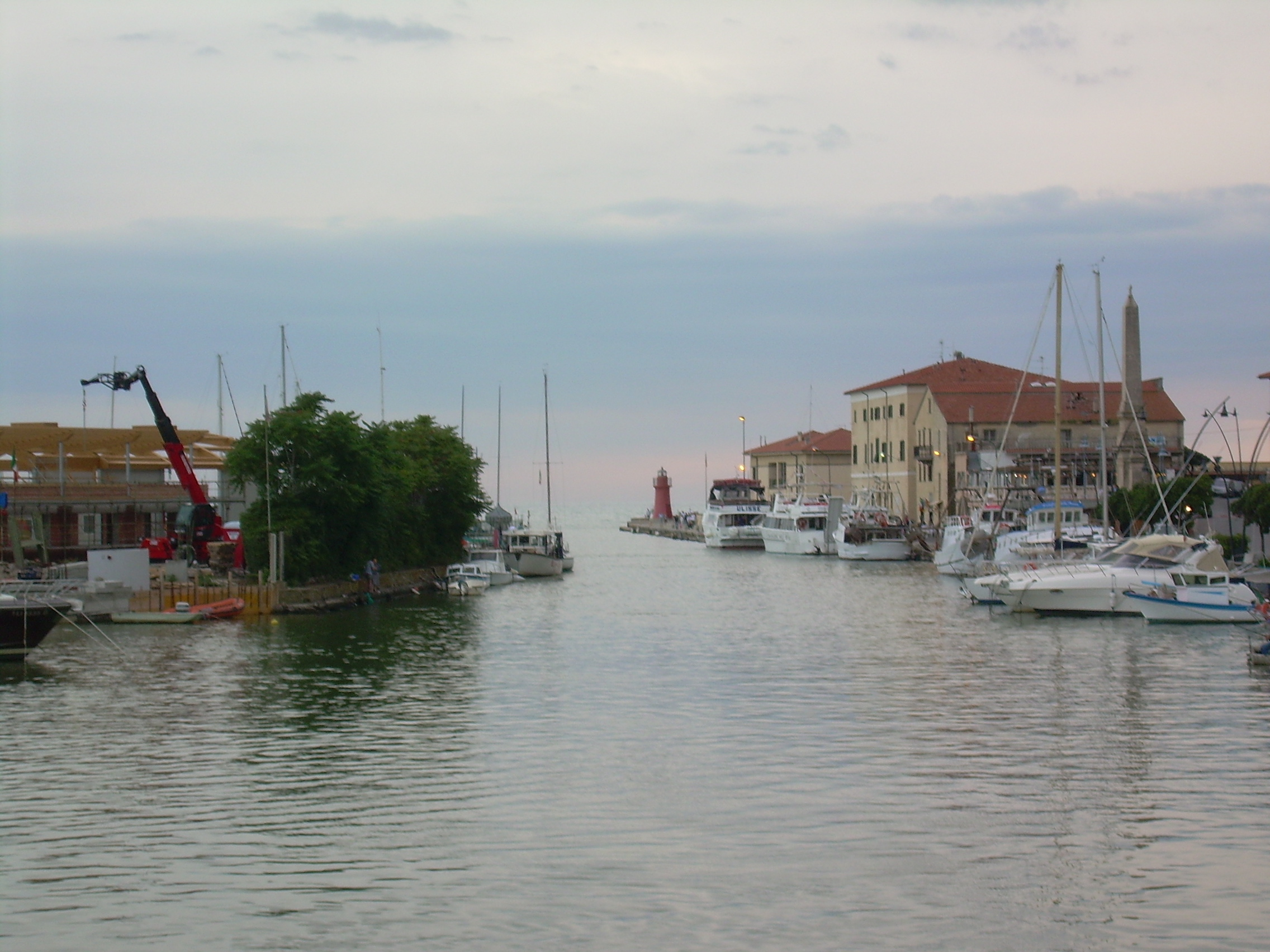

Event title
- Edition: 46
- Host: Club Velico Castiglione della Pescaia (CVCP)

Event details
- Venue: Castiglione della Pescaia, Italy
- Dates: 28 March – 3 April
- Yachts: 21
- Opening ceremony: 28 March

Competitors
- Competitors: 63
- Competing nations: 10

Results
- (gold) Gold: Ukraine; Igor Yushko; Serhiy Pichuhin; Dmitriy Yarmolenko
- (silver) Silver: Germany; Roman Koch; Maxl Koch; Gregor Bornemann
- (bronze) Bronze: United States; Charlie Kamps; Jeremy McMahon; Toby Kamps

Rank	Country	Helmsman	Crew	Sail No.	Race 1		Race 2		Race 3		Race 4		Race 5		Race 6		Race 7		Race 8		Race 9		Total	Total – discard
Rank	Country	Helmsman	Crew	Sail No.	Pos.	Pts.	Pos.	Pts.	Pos.	Pts.	Pos.	Pts.	Pos.	Pts.	Pos.	Pts.	Pos.	Pts.	Pos.	Pts.	Pos.	Pts.	Total	Total – discard
1st place, gold medalist(s)	UKR	Igor Yushko	Serhiy Pichuhin; Dmitriy Yarmolenko	UKR 1	4	4	4	4	~~8~~	~~8~~	4	4	1	1	3	3	5	5	4	4	1	1	34	26
2nd place, silver medalist(s)	GER	Roman Koch	Maxl Koch; Gregor Bornemann	GER 1	2	2	6	6	~~OCS~~	~~22~~	1	1	5	5	6	6	4	4	8	8	6	6	60	38
3rd place, bronze medalist(s)	USA	Charlie Kamps	Jeremy McMahon; Toby Kamps	USA 832	~~16~~	~~16~~	1	1	6	6	8	8	4	4	2	2	7	7	5	5	7	7	56	40
4	NED	Rudy den Outer	Gavin Lidlow; Ramzi Souli	NED 33	11	11	8	8	2	2	6	6	3	3	5	5	1	1	~~15~~	~~15~~	5	5	56	41
5	SLO	Bostjan Antoncic	Marin Lovrovic, Sr. Gennadi Strakh (BLR)	SLO 1	9	9	~~OCS~~	~~22~~	7	7	3	3	2	2	1	1	2	2	11	11	12	12	69	47
6	CAN	Peter Hall	Berend Vree (NED); Ben Medendorp (NED)	CAN 225	1	1	9	9	~~OCS~~	~~22~~	2	2	7	7	4	4	DNF	22	1	1	4	4	72	50
7	GER	Karl Haist	Patrick Wichmann; Martin Zeileis (NED)	GER 308	7	7	10	10	1	1	7	7	9	9	~~11~~	~~11~~	3	3	6	6	8	8	62	51
8	NED	Johan Offermans	Niels van Braam; Wick Hillege	NED 1	14	14	~~15~~	~~15~~	4	4	5	5	10	10	8	8	8	8	7	7	3	3	74	59
9	ESP	Guillermo Parodi	Federico Linares Garcia de Cosio; Chavarri Vargas Borja	ESP 247	~~13~~	~~13~~	3	3	5	5	13	13	8	8	7	7	11	11	3	3	11	11	74	61
10	GER	Michael Dietzel	Anna Dietzel; Sigrid Dietzel	GER 328	3	3	13	13	~~OCS~~	~~22~~	12	12	13	13	9	9	13	13	2	2	2	2	89	67
11	AUT	Christian Holler	Peter Farbowski; Mattijs Holler	AUT 1	6	6	5	5	3	3	11	11	~~DNF~~	~~22~~	13	13	14	14	12	12	9	9	95	73
12	NED	Bram Soethoudt	Gabor Helmhout; Geert Verheij	NED 38	10	10	~~OCS~~	~~22~~	11	11	10	10	6	6	15	15	6	6	10	10	14	14	104	82
13	AUT	Ludwig Beurle	Markus Gnan; Ekkehart Steinhuber	AUT 102	8	8	12	12	10	10	15	15	14	14	~~19~~	~~19~~	9	9	18	18	13	13	118	99
14	GER	Heino von Schuckmann	Dominik Meissner; Christian Mack	GER 318	12	12	2	2	~~DSQ~~	~~22~~	14	14	11	11	12	12	12	12	DNC	22	DNC	22	129	107
15	ITA	Riccardo Nappi	Alfio Galeotti; Matteo Maiano	ITA 239	15	15	7	7	12	12	17	17	17	17	~~DNC~~	~~22~~	17	17	9	9	16	16	132	110
16	ITA	Domenico Carducci	Leonardo Saletti; Niccolò Trombini	ITA 254	18	18	16	16	15	15	~~20~~	~~20~~	12	12	10	10	18	18	13	13	10	10	132	112
17	GER	Gernot Heller	Gerhard Auerswald; Maxy Koch	GER 312	5	5	~~OCS~~	~~22~~	13	13	18	18	18	18	18	18	16	16	14	14	18	18	142	120
18	NOR	Frank Ormstad	Mads Baar; Bjørn Gulbrandsen	NOR 116	~~21~~	~~21~~	11	11	14	14	19	19	15	15	16	16	15	15	16	16	15	15	142	121
19	ITA	Michele Tognozzi	Andrea Maramai; Giuliano Carotti	ITA 251	20	20	17	17	~~OCS~~	~~22~~	9	9	DNF	22	14	14	10	10	17	17	DNF	22	153	131
20	ITA	Fabio Armellini	Attilia Papini; Nicola Armellini	ITA 241	17	17	18	18	9	9	16	16	16	16	17	17	~~DNS~~	~~22~~	DNC	22	DNC	22	159	137
21	ITA	Enrico Galbiati	Antonio Gorgoglione; Luigi Bigone	ITA 194	19	19	14	14	~~DNF~~	~~22~~	21	21	DNS	22	DNC	22	19	19	19	19	17	17	175	153

Legend: DNF – Did not finish; OCS – On the course side of the starting line;
Discard is crossed out and does not count for the overall result.

- 2013 Progress

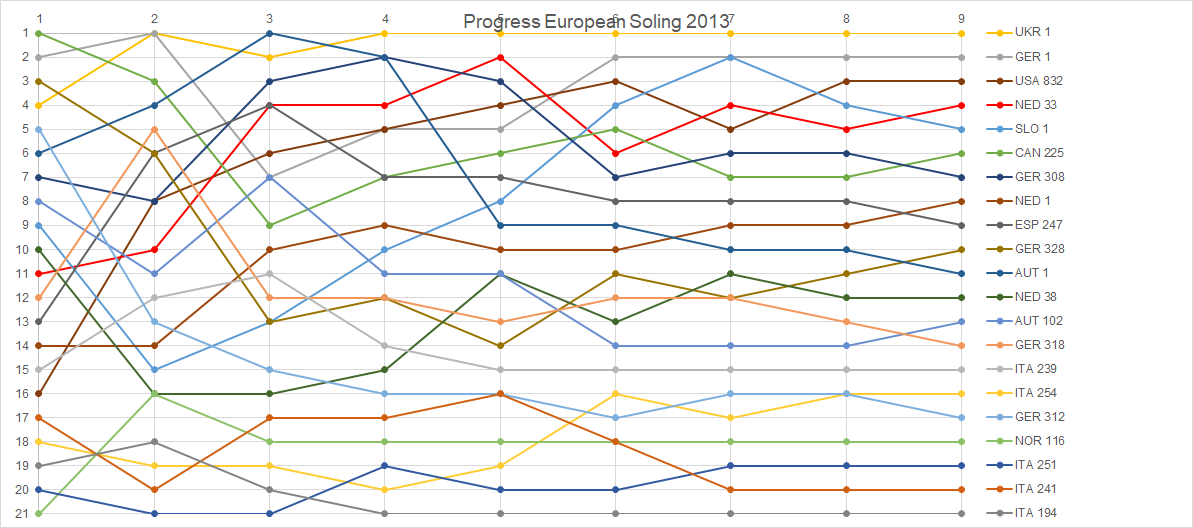

== 2014 Final results ==
2014
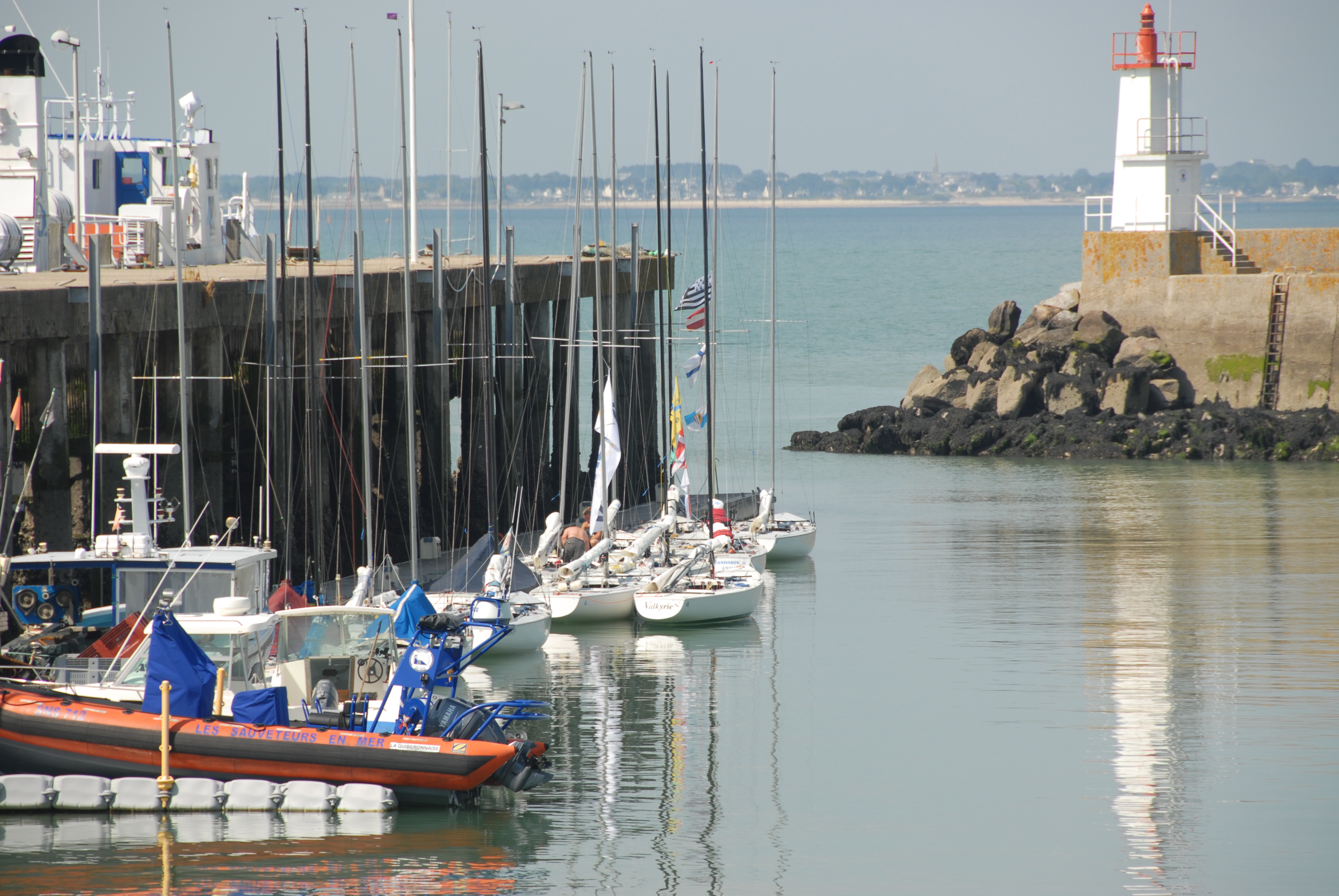

Event title
- Edition: 47
- Host: Société des Régates de Saint Pierre Quiberon (SRSP)

Event details
- Venue: Saint-Pierre-Quiberon, France
- Dates: 14–19 June
- Yachts: 16
- Opened by: Laurence Le Duvéhat (Mayor of Saint-Pierre-Quiberon)
- Opening ceremony: 14 June

Competitors
- Competitors: 48
- Competing nations: 7

Results
- (gold) Gold: Germany; Uwe Steingroß; Karsten Eller; Tim Giesecke
- (silver) Silver: Canada; Peter Hall; Will Hall; Steve Lacey
- (bronze) Bronze: Netherlands; Rudy den Outer; Gavin Lidlow; Ramzi Souli

Rank	Country	Helmsman	Crew	Sail No.	Race 1		Race 2		Race 3		Race 4		Race 5		Race 6		Race 7		Race 8		Race 9		Total	Total – discard
Rank	Country	Helmsman	Crew	Sail No.	Pos.	Pts.	Pos.	Pts.	Pos.	Pts.	Pos.	Pts.	Pos.	Pts.	Pos.	Pts.	Pos.	Pts.	Pos.	Pts.	Pos.	Pts.	Total	Total – discard
1st place, gold medalist(s)	GER	Uwe Steingroß	Karsten Eller; Tim Giesecke	GER 323	5	5	2	2	2	2	1	1	3	3	2	2	1	1	2	2	~~DNC~~	~~17~~	35	18
2nd place, silver medalist(s)	CAN	Peter Hall	Will Hall; Steve Lacey	CAN 225	1	1	1	1	4	4	4	4	2	2	~~6~~	~~6~~	4	4	4	4	2	2	28	22
3rd place, bronze medalist(s)	NED	Rudy den Outer	Gavin Lidlow; Ramzi Souli	NED 33	2	2	7	7	1	1	2	2	4	4	~~8~~	~~8~~	8	8	1	1	1	1	34	26
4	HUN	György Wossala	Christoph Wossala; Károly Vezér	HUN 77	3	3	5	5	5	5	3	3	RDG	4	1	1	2	2	~~9~~	~~9~~	4	4	36	27
5	NED	Johan Offermans	Niels van Braam; Wick Hillige	NED 1	7	7	~~8~~	~~8~~	7	7	6	6	1	1	3	3	7	7	5	5	3	3	47	39
6	GER	Roman Koch	Maxl Koch; Gregor Bornemann	GER 1	4	4	3	3	3	3	5	5	5	5	9	9	6	6	6	6	~~DSQ~~	~~17~~	58	41
7	GER	Michael Dietzel	Maxy Koch; Anna Dietzel	GER 328	6	6	4	4	10	10	7	7	~~11~~	~~11~~	7	7	9	9	3	3	5	5	62	51
8	USA	Matias Collins	François Gombeaud (FRA); Raimund Machatschek (AUT)	USA 853	8	8	12	12	6	6	11	11	6	6	5	5	10	10	8	8	~~DNC~~	~~17~~	83	66
9	FRA	Jean-Marie le Guillou	Jean-Claude Luttenbacher; Jean-Christophe Richard	FRA 164	9	9	~~13~~	~~13~~	11	11	9	9	10	10	13	13	3	3	7	7	8	8	83	70
10	FRA	Marc Lefevre	Louis-Etienne du Reau; Henri Lefevre	FRA 198	10	10	6	6	8	8	8	8	9	9	12	12	12	12	~~14~~	~~14~~	6	6	85	71
11	AUT	Christian Holler	Peter Farbowski; Cornelius Hoflich	AUT 1	~~OCS~~	~~17~~	10	10	9	9	13	13	7	7	4	4	5	5	10	10	OCS	17	92	75
12	FRA	Yves Steff	Yves Allain; Bruno Gerard	FRA 182	11	11	11	11	~~14~~	~~14~~	10	10	13	13	11	11	11	11	11	11	7	7	99	85
13	AUT	Ludwig Beurle	Christian Fischer; Ekkehart Steinhuber	AUT 102	~~OCS~~	~~17~~	9	9	12	12	12	12	12	12	10	10	15	15	13	13	9	9	109	92
14	GER	Gernot Heller	Gerhard Auerswald; Valentin Koch	GER 312	12	12	14	14	15	15	~~16~~	~~16~~	14	14	14	14	13	13	15	15	10	10	123	107
15	FRA	Pierre Montecot	Thierry Fournier; Pierre Casaux	FRA 201	13	13	15	15	13	13	14	14	~~DNF~~	~~17~~	DNC	17	14	14	12	12	11	11	126	109
16	FRA	Jacques Montecot	Claire Montecot; Gabriel Couronne	FRA 47	14	14	~~16~~	~~16~~	16	16	15	15	15	15	15	15	16	16	16	16	12	12	135	119

Legend: DNC – Did not come to the starting area; DNF – Did not finish; DNS – Did not start; DSQ – Disqualified; RDG – Redress given;
Discard is crossed out and does not count for the overall result.

- 2014 Progress

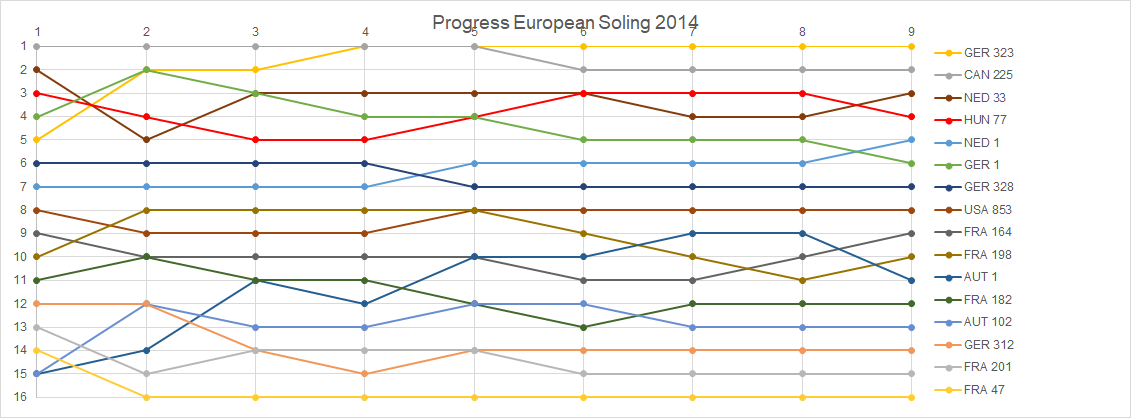

== Further results ==
For further results see:

- Soling European Championship results (1968–1979)
- Soling European Championship results (1980–1984)
- Soling European Championship results (1985–1989)
- Soling European Championship results (1990–1994)
- Soling European Championship results (1995–1999)
- Soling European Championship results (2000–2004)
- Soling European Championship results (2005–2009)
- Soling European Championship results (2010–2014)
- Soling European Championship results (2015–2019)
- Soling European Championship results (2020–2024)
