= Héctor Campos =

Héctor Campos may refer to:

- Héctor Campos (judoka)
- Héctor Campos (sailor)
- Héctor Campos Parsi, Puerto Rican composer
