= Karlo Hmeljak =

Slovenian sailor and poet

Karlo Hmeljak (born 8 March 1983 in Koper) is a Slovenian sailor and poet. He competed at the 2008 Summer Olympics in the men's 470 two-person dinghy with Mitja Nevečny and in the 2012 Summer Olympics in the Men's Laser class.
