= Christoph Bergmann =

Olympic sailor from Brazil

Personal information
- Nationality: Brazil
- Born: 10 May 1963 (age 62) Rio de Janeiro
- Height: 1.98 m (6.5 ft)

Sport

Sailing career
- Class: Soling
- Club: Clube do Rio de Janeiro
- Updated on 27 February 2020

Christoph Bergmann (born 10 May 1963) is a sailor from Brazil, who represented his country at the 1988 Summer Olympics in Busan, South Korea as crew member in the Soling. With helmsman Jose Paulo Dias and fellow crew members Daniel Adler and Jose Augusto Dias they took the 5th place. Bergman took over from Daniel Adler after race five, due to illness of Daniel for race 6 & 7.
