= José Pérez (sailor) =

Spanish sailor

Personal information
- Full name: José Pérez Castañe
- Nationality: Spanish
- Born: 7 January 1961 (age 65) Blanes, Spain
- Height: 1.85 m (6.1 ft)

Sport

Sailing career
- Class: Star
- Club: CV Blanes
- Updated on 27 February 2020

José Pérez Castañe (born 7 January 1961 in Blanes) is a sailor from Spain, who represented his country at the 1988 Summer Olympics in Busan, South Korea as crew member in the Star. With helmsman Juan Costas they took the 17th place.

== Sources ==
- "José Pérez Bio, Stats, and Results". Olympic Sports. Sports-Reference.com. Archived from the original on 16 December 2012.
