= Raúl Lena =

Olympic sailor from Argentina

Personal information
- Full name: Raúl Ariel Lena
- Nationality: Argentina
- Born: 23 June 1954 (age 72)
- Height: 1.81 m (5.9 ft)

Sport

Sailing career
- Class: Soling
- Updated on 28 February 2020

Raúl Lena (born 23 June 1954) is a sailor from Argentina. who represented his country at the 1988 Summer Olympics in Busan, South Korea as crew member in the Soling. With helmsman Santiago Lange and fellow crew members Pedro Ferrero they took the 9th place.
