= Carlos Sanguinetti =

Olympic sailor from Argentina

Personal information
- Full name: Carlos Augusto Sanguinetti
- Nationality: Argentina
- Born: 1 January 1961 (age 65)
- Height: 1.80 m (5.9 ft)

Sailing career
- Sport: Sailing
- Class: Soling
- Updated on 27 February 2020

Carlos Sanguinetti (born 1 January 1961) is a sailor from Argentina, who represented his country at the 1984 Summer Olympics in Los Angeles, United States as crew member in the Soling. With helmsman Pedro Ferrero and fellow crew member Alberto Llorens they took the 13th place.
