= José Augusto Dias =

Olympic sailor from Brazil

Personal information
- Nationality: Brazil
- Born: 3 February 1959 (age 66)
- Height: 1.78 m (5.8 ft)

Sport

Sailing career
- Class: Soling
- Updated on 27 February 2020

José Augusto Dias (born 3 February 1959) is a sailor from Brazil, who represented his country at the 1988 Summer Olympics in Busan, South Korea as crew member in the Soling. With helmsman Jose Paulo Dias and fellow crew members Daniel Adler and Christoph Bergman they took the 5th place. José Augusto with helmsman Jose Paulo Dias and fellow crew member Daniel Adler took 13th place during the 1992 Summer Olympics in Barcelona, Spain as helmsman in the Soling.
