= Edson de Araújo Jr. =

Olympic sailor from Brazil

Personal information
- Full name: Edson Medeiros de Araújo Junior
- Nationality: Brazil
- Born: 14 July 1969 (age 57) Florianópolis
- Height: 1.75 m (5.7 ft)

Sailing career
- Sport: Sailing
- Club: ICSC - Florianopolis
- Class: Soling
- Updated on 1 March 2020

Edson de Araújo Jr. (born 14 July 1969) is a sailor from Florianópolis, Brazil. who represented his country at the 1996 Summer Olympics in Savannah, United States as crew member in the Soling. With helmsman Daniel Glomb and fellow crew member Marcelo Reitz they took the 21st place.
