= Marcelo Reitz =

Olympic sailor from Brazil

Personal information
- Nationality: Brazil
- Born: 21 December 1963 (age 62) Florianópolis
- Height: 1.75 m (5.7 ft)

Sport

Sailing career
- Class: Soling
- Club: ICSC - Florianopolis
- Updated on 1 March 2020

Marcelo Reitz (born 21 December 1963) is a sailor from Florianópolis, Brazil. who represented his country at the 1996 Summer Olympics in Savannah, United States, as crew member in the Soling ("Open three-person keelboat). With helmsman Daniel Glomb and fellow crew member Edson de Araújo Jr. they took the 21st place.
