= Mitja Nevečny =

Slovenian sailor (born 1983)

Personal information
- Nationality: Slovenian
- Born: 10 April 1983 (age 43) Koper, SR Slovenia, SFR Yugoslavia
- Height: 183 cm (6 ft 0 in)
- Weight: 70 kg (154 lb)

Sailing career
- Sport: Sailing
- Club: JK Jadro Koper
- Coached by: Tine Može
- Class: 470

Mitja Nevečny (born 10 April 1983) is a Slovenian former sailor, who specialized in the two-person dinghy (470) class. Together with his partner and eventual two-time Olympian Karlo Hmeljak, he was named one of the country's top sailors in the double-handed dinghy for the 2008 Summer Olympics, finishing in a lowly eighteenth place. A member of the local sailing club in his native Koper (Slovene: Jadralni klub Jadro Koper), Nevečny trained for the Games under his personal coach Tine Može.

Nevečny competed for the Slovenian sailing squad, as a crew member in the men's 470 class, at the 2008 Summer Olympics in Beijing. Building up to their Olympic selection, he and skipper Hmeljak finished a satisfying twenty-fifth to secure one of the twenty quota places offered at the 2007 ISAF Worlds in Cascais, Portugal. The Slovenian pair got off to a stellar start with a top-three mark posted in the opening race, before a streak of substandard outcomes under windy conditions, however, pushed both Nevečny and Hmeljak to the middle of the 29-boat fleet for the rest of 10-leg regatta. They stormed out from behind to take the eighth spot on the last leg, but their overall score was not enough to let the Slovenes enter the medal round, sitting them in a lowly eighteenth overall with 139 net points.
