= Matias Collins =

American sailor

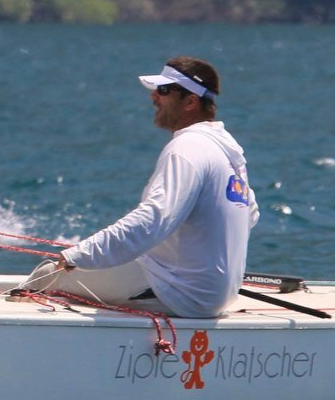
- Matias Collins during the 2019 Soling European Championship at Lake Garda, ITA

Personal information
- Nickname: Lijas
- Nationality: American, Argentinian, Italian
- Born: May 25, 1970 (age 56) Hartford, Connecticut
- Height: 180 cm (5 ft 11 in)
- Weight: 107 kg (236 lb)

Sailing career
- Sport: Sailing
- Club: UIC, CNSI, SIC
- Coached by: Vladimir Bolonitov
- Classes: Soling, Star
Medal record
Sailing
Representing Argentina
South American Championships
| Gold medal – first place | 1999 Paranaguá | Soling |
Representing United States
South American Championships
| Bronze medal – third place | 2018 Frey Bentos | Soling |

Matias Collins (born May 25, 1970) is an American, Argentinian and Italian sailor. As sailor he competed in many Soling World, European, North American and South American Championships since 1997

== Personal and professional life ==
Collins was born May 25, 1970, in Hartford, Connecticut. He is married. The couple has three children.

Collins holds a bachelor in food technology. He is since 2003 the secretary of the International Soling Association.

== Sailing career ==
Together with Gustavo Warburg (helmsman) and Maximo Smith he took the 1999 South American Championship in the Soling while sailing for Argentina. This team won as well the 1998 Argentinian Championship and 1998 Uruguayan Championship both in the Soling. In 2018 Matias won the bronze as helmsman in the South American Championship together with Tomas Morgan and Mariano Cambon in the Soling while sailing for the USA.

Other offices
| Preceded by Fleur Ainsley | Secretary International Soling Association; 2004 - present | Incumbent |
