= José Paulo Dias =

Olympic sailor from Brazil

Personal information
- Nationality: Brazil
- Born: 23 December 1957 (age 68)
- Height: 1.78 m (5.8 ft)

Sport

Sailing career
- Class: Soling
- Updated on 27 February 2020

José Paulo Dias is a sailor from Brazil, who represented his country at the 1988 Summer Olympics in Busan, South Korea as helmsman in the Soling. With crew members Jose Augusto Dias, Daniel Adler and Christoph Bergman they took the 5th place. José Paulo with crew members Jose Augusto Dias and Daniel Adler took 13th place during the 1992 Summer Olympics in Barcelona, Spain as helmsman in the Soling.
