= Harry Adler =

Brazilian sailor (born 1928)

Harry Herchel Adler
Personal information
- Born: September 21, 1928 (age 96); Salvador, Bahia, Brazil

Sport
- Sport: Sailing

Harry Herchel Adler (born 21 September 1928) is a Brazilian former sailor who competed in the 1964 Summer Olympics in the Star class. One year prior, he won a bronze in the 1963 Pan American Games. He was born in Salvador, Bahia. His sons Daniel Adler and Alan Adler also sailed in the Olympics.
