= Daniel Glomb =

Olympic sailor from Brazil

Personal information
- Full name: Daniel A. Glomb
- Nationality: Brazil
- Born: 22 December 1980 Curitiba
- Height: 1.78 m (5.8 ft)

Sailing career
- Sport: Sailing
- Club: FVMEP
- Class: Soling
- Updated on 1 March 2020

Daniel Glomb (born: 22 December 1980 Curitiba) is a sailor from Brazil, who represented his country at the 1996 Summer Olympics in Savannah, United States as helmsman in the Soling. With crew members Edson de Araújo Jr. and Marcelo Reitz they took the 21st place.
