= Pedro Ferrero =

Argentine sailor

Personal information
- Full name: Pedro Ferrero
- Nationality: Argentine
- Born: March 21, 1939 (age 87)
- Height: 1.75 m (5.7 ft)

Sailing career
- Sport: Sailing
- Class: Soling

Pedro Ferrero (born 21 March 1939) is a sailor from Argentina. Ferrero represented his country at the 1972 Summer Olympics in Kiel. Ferrero took 22nd place in the Soling with Ricardo Boneo as helmsman and Héctor Campos as fellow crew member. Ferrero second appearance was during the 1976 Summer Olympics in Kingston. Ferrero took 20th place in the Soling as helmsman with Andrés Robinson and Jorge Rão as fellow crew members. In the 1984 Summer Olympics in Long Beach, California, Ferrero took 13th place in the Soling as helmsman with Alberto Llorens and Carlos Sanguinetti as fellow crew members. Ferrero his final Olympic appearance came at the 1988 Summer Olympics in Pusan, Ferrero took 9th place in the Soling with Santiago Lange as helmsman and Raúl Lena as fellow crew member.
