= Andrés Robinson =

Olympic Sailor from Argentina

Personal information
- Full name: Andrés J. Robinson
- Nationality: Argentina
- Born: 16 June 1952 (age 74)
- Height: 1.85 m (6.1 ft)

Sailing career
- Sport: Sailing
- Class: Soling
- Updated on 27 February 2020

Andrés Robinson (born 16 June 1952) is a sailor from Argentina, who represented his country at the 1976 Summer Olympics in Kingston, Ontario, Canada as crew member in the Soling. With helmsman Pedro Ferrero and fellow crew member Jorge Rão they took the 20th place.
