= Jorge Rão =

Olympic Sailor from Argentina

Personal information
- Full name: Jorge A. Rão
- Nationality: Argentina
- Height: 1.65 m (5.4 ft)

Sailing career
- Sport: Sailing
- Class: Soling
- Updated on 27 February 2020

Jorge Rão is a sailor from Argentina, who represented his country at the 1976 Summer Olympics in Kingston, Ontario, Canada as crew member in the Soling. With helmsman Pedro Ferrero and fellow crew member Andrés Robinson they took the 20th place.
