= Ricardo Boneo =

Argentine rower and sailor

Personal information
- Full name: Ricardo Manuel Boneo
- Born: 17 December 1930 Lincoln, Buenos Aires Province, Argentina
- Died: 6 June 2008 (aged 77)
- Height: 1.72 m (5.6 ft)

Sport

Sailing career
- Class(es): Coxed four Finn; Soling

Ricardo Manuel Boneo (17 December 1930 – 6 June 2008) was an Argentine rower and sailor. He represented Argentina at the 1948 Summer Olympics, the 1960 Summer Olympics and the 1972 Summer Olympics.

== Biography ==
He was born on 17 December 1930, in Lincoln, Buenos Aires Province. Boneo represented his country for the first time as a rower at the 1948 Summer Olympics in London. Boneo was the coxswain in the men's coxed four with teammates Carlos Semino, Carlos Crosta, Adolfo Yedro and Ítalo Sartori. The team made it to round one of the repêchage. Then Boneo made the move to sailing and represented his country again at the 1960 Summer Olympics in Naples. Boneo took 19th place in the Finn. Four years later at the 1964 Summer Olympics in Enoshima, Japan. Boneo took 26th place in the Finn. Boneo his last Olympic appearance was at the 1972 Summer Olympics in Kiel, Gernamny. Boneo took 22nd place in the Soling with Héctor Campos and Pedro Ferrero as fellow crew members. He died on 6 June 2008 at the age of 77.
