= Alan Adler (sailor) =

Brazilian sailor

Personal information
- Born: 23 May 1964 (age 62) Rio de Janeiro, Brazil
- Height: 1.86 m (6 ft 1 in)
- Weight: 80 kg (176 lb)

Sailing career
- Sport: Sailing
- Class(es): Star, Soling, Flying Dutchman
Medal record
Sailing
Representing Brazil
Star World Championships
Gold medal – first place	1989 Porto Cervo	Star
Silver medal – second place	1994 San Diego	Star
Maccabiah Games
Gold medal – first place	1989 Tel Aviv	Laser
Soling South American Championships
Gold medal – first place	1997 Paranaguá	Soling
Silver medal – second place	1998 Armação dos Búzios	Soling
Silver medal – second place	1999 Paranaguá	Soling
Gold medal – first place	2000 Porto Alegre	Soling

Alan Adler (born 23 May 1964) is a Brazilian sailor. He competed in the 1984, 1988, and 1992 Summer Olympics.

He won a gold medal in the yacht laser event at the 1989 Maccabiah Games in Israel.
