= Juan Costas =

Spanish sailor (1945–2018)

Personal information
- Full name: Juan Costas Tordera
- Nationality: Spanish
- Born: 26 June 1945 Barcelona, Spain
- Died: 2 September 2018 (aged 73) Blanes, Spain
- Height: 1.82 m (6.0 ft)

Sport

Sailing career
- Class(es): Star, Soling, Snipe
- Club: CV Blanes
- Updated on 27 February 2020

Juan Costas Tordera (Note: In this Spanish name, the first or paternal surname is Costas and the second or maternal family name is Tordera.) (26 June 1945 – 2 September 2018) was a Spanish sailor who represented his country at two Olympic Games. The first time was at the 1976 Summer Olympics in Kingston, Ontario, Canada as helmsman in the Soling. With crew members Félix Anglada and Humberto Costas they took the 12th place. The second appearance was the 1988 Summer Olympics in Busan, South Korea as helmsman in the Star. With crew member José Pérez they took the 17th place.
