= Humberto Costas =

Spanish sailor

Humbert Costas
Personal information
- Full name: Humbert Costas Tordera
- Nationality: Spanish
- Born: 17 December 1949 (age 76) Barcelona, Spain
- Height: 1.73 m (5.7 ft)

Sport

Sailing career
- Class(es): Soling, Snipe
- Club: CV Blanes
- Updated on 27 February 2020

Humbert Costas Tordera (born 17 December 1949 in Barcelona) is a sailor from Spain, who represented his country at the 1976 Summer Olympics in Kingston, Ontario, Canada as crew member in the Soling. With helmsman Juan Costas and fellow crew member Félix Anglada they took the 12th place.

== Sources ==
- "Humbert Costas Bio, Stats, and Results". Olympic Sports. Sports-Reference.com. Archived from the original on 13 December 2012.
