= Ronaldo Senfft =

Brazilian sailor

Medal record

Sailing

Representing Brazil

Olympic Games
| Silver medal – second place | 1984 Los Angeles | Soling class |

Ronaldo Camargo Ribeiro Senfft (born 12 July 1954) is a Brazilian sailor. He won the Silver medal in the Soling class at the 1984 Summer Olympics in Los Angeles along with Daniel Adler and Torben Grael.
