= Alberto Llorens =

Olympic sailor from Argentina

Personal information
- Full name: Alberto A. Llorens
- Nationality: Argentina
- Born: 24 March 1945 (age 80)
- Height: 180 cm (5 ft 11 in)
- Weight: 85 kg (187 lb)

Sport

Sailing career
- Class: Soling

Alberto A. Llorens (born 24 March 1945) is a sailor from Argentina who represented his country at the 1984 Summer Olympics in Los Angeles, United States as crew member in the Soling. With helmsman Pedro Ferrero and fellow crew member Carlos Sanguinetti they took the 13th place.
