= Félix Anglada =

Spanish sailor

Personal information
- Full name: José Félix Anglada Zariquey
- Nationality: Spanish
- Born: 11 February 1949 (age 77) Barcelona, Spain
- Height: 1.73 m (5.7 ft)

Sailing career
- Sport: Sailing
- Club: CV Blanes
- Class: Soling
- Updated on 27 February 2020

Félix Anglada Zariquey (born 11 February 1949, in Barcelona) is a sailor from Spain, who represented his country at the 1976 Summer Olympics in Kingston, Ontario, Canada as crew member in the Soling. With helmsman Juan Costas and fellow crew member Humberto Costas they took the 12th place.

== Sources ==
- "Félix Anglada Bio, Stats, and Results". Olympic Sports. Sports-Reference.com. Archived from the original on 14 December 2012.
