= Gustavo Warburg =

Argentine sailor

Personal information
- Nationality: Argentine
- Born: 7 August 1964 (age 60)

Sport
- Sport: Sailing

Gustavo Warburg (born 7 August 1964) is an Argentine sailor. He competed in the men's 470 event at the 1992 Summer Olympics.
