= Héctor Campos (sailor) =

Argentine sailor

Personal information
- Full name: Héctor Oscar Campos
- Nationality: Argentine
- Born: August 27, 1945 (age 81)
- Height: 1.78 m (5.8 ft)

Sailing career
- Sport: Sailing
- Class: Soling

Héctor Oscar Campos (born 27 August 1945) is a sailor from Argentina. Campos represented his country at the 1972 Summer Olympics in Kiel. Campos took 22nd place in the Soling with Ricardo Boneo as helmsman and Pedro Ferrero as fellow crew member.
