= Daniel Adler (sailor) =

Brazilian sailor (born 1958)

Personal information
- Nationality: Brazilian
- Born: April 16, 1958 (age 68) Rio de Janeiro
- Height: 5 ft 11 in (1.80 m)
- Weight: 159 lb (72 kg)

Sailing career
- Sport: Sailing
- Class: Soling
Medal record
Sailing
Representing Brazil
Olympic Games
Silver medal – second place	1984 Los Angeles	Soling class

Daniel Adler (born April 16, 1958) is a Brazilian sailor. He is Jewish. His father Harry Adler and brother Alan Adler were also sailing Olympians.

Adler won a silver medal for Brazil at the 1984 Olympics in Los Angeles in yachting (Soling), with Torben Grael and Ronaldo Senfft. He also competed in the 1988 Olympics in Seoul (coming in 5th) where he sailed in Race 1 to 5 before being replaced by Christoph Bergman due to illness and the 1992 Olympics in Barcelona (coming in 13th).

He is the brother of Olympian Alan Adler, who competed for Brazil in the 1984, 1988, and 1992 Olympics in the Mixed Two-Person Heavyweight Dinghy, and the son of Harry Adler, who was in the 1964 Olympics. His niece is Brazilian Girl’s 29er Daniela Adler Pimentel Duarte.

== See also ==
- List of select Jews in sailing
- List of Olympic medalists in sailing
