= David James =

Dewi, Dai, Dafydd or David James may refer to:

== Performers ==
- David James (actor, born 1839) (1839–1893), English stage comic and a founder of London's Vaudeville Theatre
- David James (actor, born 1967), Australian presenter of ABC's Play School
- David James (actor, born 1972), South African who played Koobus Venter in 2009 film District 9
- David James (singer), Canadian country music songwriter since 2013

== Public officials ==
- David James (American politician) (1843–1921), member of Wisconsin State Senate
- David James (Australian politician) (1854–1926), member of South Australia House of Assembly
- David James (British MP) (1919–1986), member of Conservative Party, notable for escape from POW camp
- David James, Baron James of Blackheath (born 1937), English corporate trouble-shooter, author of Conservative Party's James Report
- David F. James (1905–1996), American farmer and lieutenant governor of Montana

== Academics ==
- David Gwilym James (1905–1968), Welsh vice chancellor of University of Southampton
- David James (cell biologist) (born 1958), Australian scientist who discovered glucose transporter GLUT4
- David James (philosopher) (born 1966), British professor of philosophy
- David James, British astronomer and minor planet discoverer

== Sportsmen ==
- Dafydd James (born 1975), Welsh rugby union wing and centre
- Dai James (1899–after 1929), Welsh footballer with Aberdare Athletic and Brighton & Hove Albion
- Dave James (racing driver) (1928–1987), American racing driver
- David James (cricketer, born 1791) (1791–1846), English player recorded in two matches for Old Etonians
- David James (cricketer, born 1921) (1921–2002), Welsh right-handed batsman
- David James (rugby, born 1866) (1866–1929), Welsh halfback
- David James (rugby, born 1906) (1906–1981), Welsh rugby union and rugby league hooker
- David James (rugby, born 1985), Welsh wing and fullback
- David James (footballer, born 1917) (1917–1981), Welsh centre forward
- David James (footballer, born 1942), Scottish winger
- David James (footballer, born 1970), English goalkeeper
- David James (sailor) (born 1949), American Olympian in 1968
- Scottie James (born 1996), American basketball player

== Others ==
- David James (painter) (1853–1904), English marine painter
- David James (bishop) (born 1945), English bishop of Bradford
- David E. James (born 1945), British-American film scholar and film maker
- David James, Welsh businessman, co-founder in 1984 of American pornographic film company Vivid Entertainment

== See also ==
- James David (disambiguation)
