= Blue Ribbon Round the Lake Balaton Race =

Europe's Oldest Round-the-Lake Regatta

56. Blue Ribbon - The Start

Kékszalag or the Blue Ribbon Round the Lake Balaton Race is an international sports event held in Hungary every year between more than 30 boat classes. The regatta starts and finishes in Balatonfüred, after the 155+km circumnavigation of the Lake Balaton. By today the regatta became Europe's most prestigious and oldest (the first was held in 1934) existing round a lake competition (Bol d'Or Mirabaud on Lake Geneva is since 1939, and Centomiglia on Lake Garda is since 1951). The Blue Ribbon's course is the longest among the main European round the lake events and nowadays has also the largest fleet competing (612 sailboats in 2009). During the race, the Transportation Rules of Inland Waterways apply. From 2014 the Hungarian Yachting Association has lifted the restrictions regarding multi-hull sailboats and today the race is open to everybody in the spirit of the founders. The fastest time to date was set on 2025 July 10 by Raiffeisen Fifty-Fifty with 4 hours 24 minutes and 11 seconds.

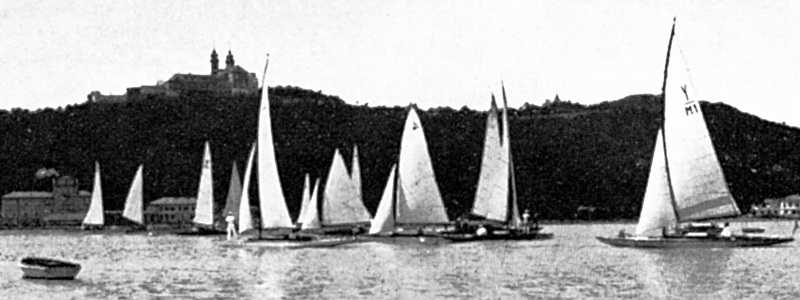
Starting line at Balatonfüred, 1934. 07.27

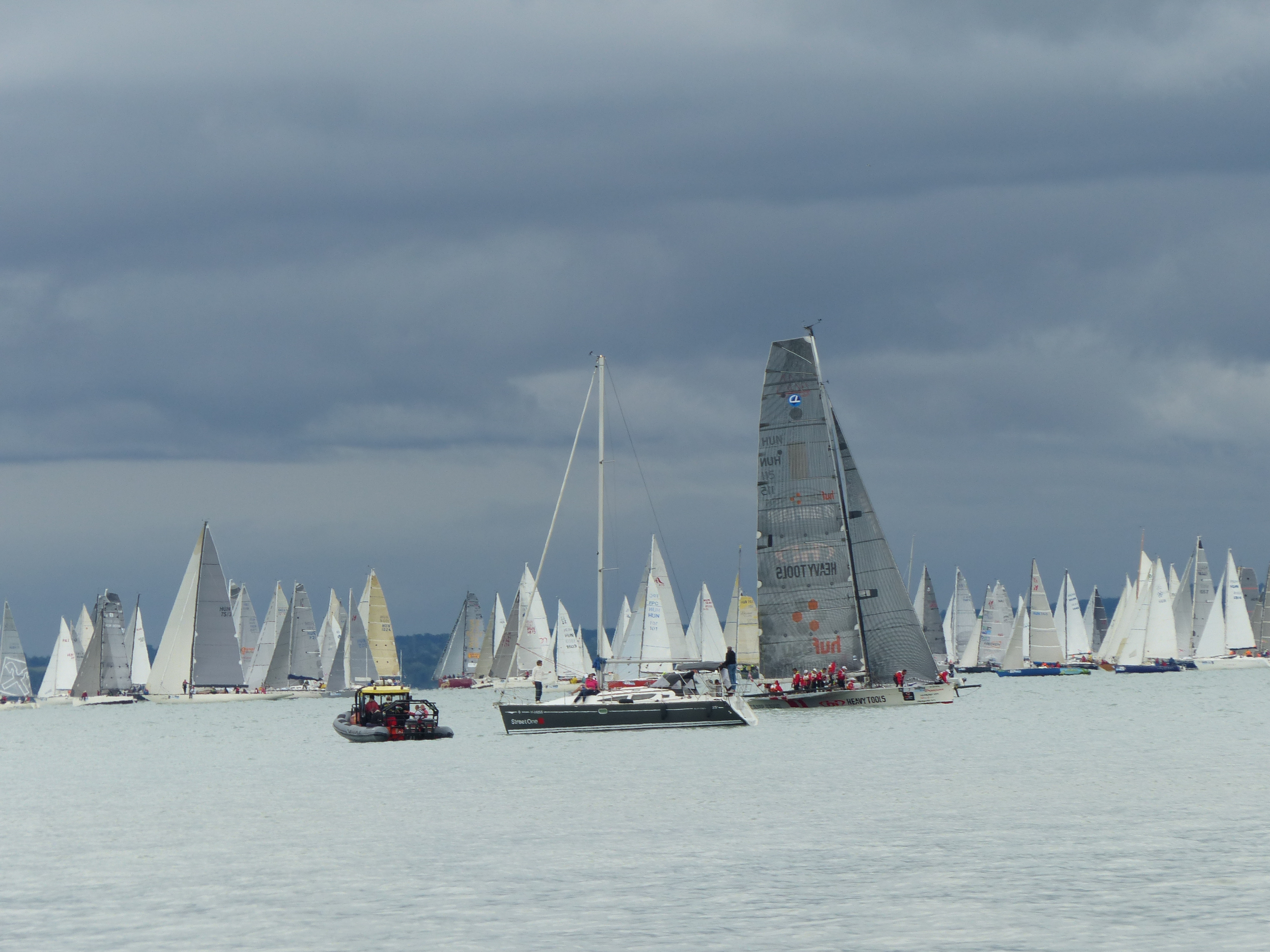
Starting line at Balatonfüred, 2016.07.14

The winner of the 1st Blue Ribbon, the Rabonbán a Square Metre Yacht, also known as Skerry Cruiser

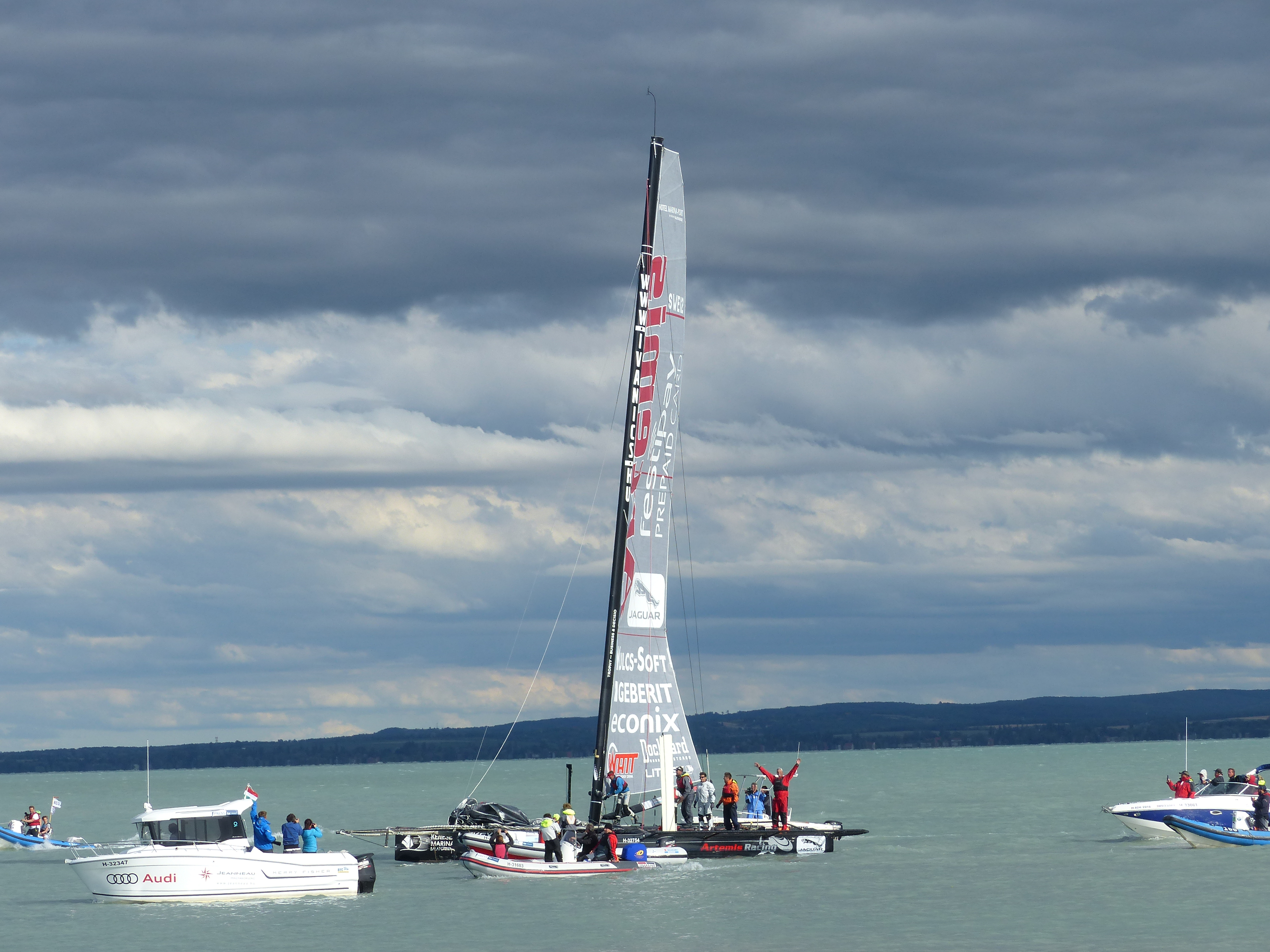
Farkas Litkey,13-time champion on his catamaran "Festipay" at the 48th Blue Ribbon.

== Absolute winners ==
- 1934 (Hungary) Gábor Ugron – Rabonbán I (30 Square Metre Yacht)
- 1936 (Hungary) Béla Kovács – Kincsem III (22 jolle)
- 1938 (Hungary) Béla Kovács – Kincsem IV (22 jolle)
- 1940 (Hungary) Evelin Gordon, Mrs. István Kultsár – Tramontana (First woman to win)
- 1942 (Hungary) Evelin Gordon, Mrs. István Kultsár – Tramontana
- 1947 (Hungary) Kálmán Tóth – Hungária
- 1949 (Hungary) János Mihálkovics – Vészmadár
- 1951 (Hungary) István Németh – Nemere II
- 1953 (Hungary) István Németh – Nemere II
- 1955 (Hungary) István Németh – Nemere II (75-Square Metre Yacht)
- 1959 (Hungary) Boldizsár Horváth – Addió (40-Square Metre Yacht)
- 1961 (Hungary) László Farkas – Kékmadár
- 1963 (Hungary) Pál Vályi – Tramontana
- 1965 (Hungary) László Tolnai – Olimpia III
- 1967 (Hungary) Tibor Debrőczy – Trinidad
- 1969 (Hungary) Lajos Berta – Rabonbán II (30-Square Metre Yacht)
- 1971 (Hungary) Balázs Bucsy – Tramontana
- 1973 (Hungary) András Gosztonyi – Blott X
- 1975 (Hungary) István Telegdy – Blott X (star)
- 1977 (Hungary) József Lovas – Tramontana
- 1979 (Hungary) József Lovas – Tramontana
- 1981 (Hungary) Szabolcs Izsák – Hárpia
- 1983 (Czechoslovakia) Zdeňka Richter – Simi
- 1985 (West Germany) Steeg Eindl – Simsalabin
- 1987 (West Germany) Steeg Eindl – Simsalabin
- 1989 (Hungary) Pál Gömöry – Tramontana
- 1991 (Germany) Helmuth Birkmayer – Gitzwerg & (tie) (Hungary) György Balogh – Nemere II
- 1993 (Hungary) Miklós Tuss – Manual
- 1995 (Hungary) Miklós Tuss – Manual
- 1997 (Austria) Christoph Wieser – Liberté
- 1999 (Hungary) Szabolcs Detre – Yuppie
- 2001 (Hungary) Farkas Litkey – Pleasure
- 2002 (Hungary) Farkas Litkey – Gardazzurra
- 2003 (Hungary) Farkas Litkey – Lisa
- 2004 (Hungary) Farkas Litkey – Gardazzurra
- 2005 (Hungary) Farkas Litkey – Liza
- 2006 (Hungary) Farkas Litkey – Clan Des Team
- 2007 (Hungary) Farkas Litkey – Lisa
- 2008 (Hungary) Farkas Litkey – Clan Des Team
- 2009 (Hungary) Farkas Litkey – Lisa
- 2010 (Germany) Roland Gäbler – NaturAqua
- 2011 (Hungary) Farkas Litkey – Lisa
- 2012 (Hungary) Márton Józsa – Fifty-Fifty
- 2013 (Hungary) Farkas Litkey – Evopro-Lisa
- 2014 (Hungary) Márton Józsa – Fifty-Fitfty
- 2015 (Switzerland) Christophe Peclard – Safram
- 2016 (Hungary) Farkas Litkey – Festipay (catamaran)
- 2017 (Hungary) Farkas Litkey – Festipay
- 2018 (Switzerland) Christophe Peclard – Safram
- 2019 (Hungary) Zoltán Petrányi – Racing Django
- 2020 (Hungary) Róbert Vándor – RSM2
- 2021 (Hungary) Róbert Vándor – RSM2
- 2022 (Hungary) Márton Józsa – Fifty-Fitfty
- 2023 (Hungary) Márton Józsa – Fifty-Fitfty
- 2024 (Hungary) Márton Józsa – Fifty-Fitfty
- 2025 (Hungary) Márton Józsa – Fifty-Fitfty
- 2026 (Hungary) Róbert Vándor – RSM

== Sources ==
- Érdekességek, amiket jó tudni a Kékszalag versenyről
- KARDINÁLIS JELEK
- The Race's Official Website
