= Sailing at the 1968 Summer Olympics – Flying Dutchman =

Sailing at the Olympics

Flying Dutchman at the Games of the XIX Olympiad
- Olympics 1968 Configuration
- Venue: Acapulco
- Dates: 14–21 October
- Competitors: 62 from 30 nations
- Teams: 30

Medalists
1st place, gold medalist(s)		Rodney Pattisson; Iain MacDonald-Smith	Great Britain
2nd place, silver medalist(s)		Ulli Libor; Peter Naumann	West Germany
3rd place, bronze medalist(s)		Reinaldo Conrad; Burkhard Cordes	Brazil

The Flying Dutchman was a sailing event on the Sailing at the 1968 Summer Olympics program in Acapulco. Seven races were scheduled. 62 sailors, on 30 boats, from 30 nations competed.

== Results ==
Rank	Helmsman (Country)	Crew	Sail No.	Race I		Race II		Race III		Race IV		Race V		Race VI		Race VII		Total Points	Total -1
Rank	Helmsman (Country)	Crew	Sail No.	Rank	Points	Rank	Points	Rank	Points	Rank	Points	Rank	Points	Rank	Points	Rank	Points	Total Points	Total -1
1st place, gold medalist(s)	Rodney Pattisson (GBR)	Iain MacDonald-Smith	K	~~DSQ~~	~~38~~	1	0	1	0	1	0	1	0	1	0	2	3	41	3
2nd place, silver medalist(s)	Ulli Libor (FRG)	Peter Naumann	G	1	0	3	5.7	2	3	2	3	13	19	~~21~~	~~27~~	7	13	70.7	43.7
3rd place, bronze medalist(s)	Reinaldo Conrad (BRA)	Burkhard Cordes	BL	~~14~~	~~20~~	7	13	4	8	3	5.7	3	5.7	10	16	1	0	68.4	48.4
4	Carl Ryves (AUS)	James Sargeant	KA	3	5.7	5	10	3	5.7	~~20~~	~~26~~	8	14	4	8	3	5.7	75.1	49.1
5	Bjørn Lofterød (NOR)	Odd Roar Lofterød	N	2	3	2	3	7	13	6	11.7	6	11.7	~~DNF~~	~~36~~	5	10	88.4	52.4
6	Bertrand Cheret (FRA)	Bruno Trouble	F	5	10	4	8	~~20~~	~~26~~	9	15	4	8	2	3	18	24	94	68
7	Roger Green (CAN)	Stewart Green	KC	9	15	16	22	5	10	5	10	2	3	~~18~~	~~24~~	13	19	103	79
8	Geoff Smale (NZL)	Ralph Roberts	KZ	~~DSQ~~	~~38~~	8	14	9	15	12	18	9	15	8	14	4	8	122	84
9	Peter Kolni (SWE)	Jörgen Kolni, Pelle Petterson	S	12	18	~~DNF~~	~~36~~	8	14	14	20	5	10	14	20	8	14	132	96
10	Bob James (USA)	David James	US	~~DNF~~	~~36~~	9	15	14	20	18	24	15	21	3	5.7	6	11.7	133.4	97.4
11	Gonzalo Fernández de Córdoba Larios (ESP)	Félix Gancedo	E	10	16	14	20	6	11.7	10	16	10	16	~~20~~	~~26~~	16	22	127.7	101.7
12	Hans-Jürgen Cochius (GDR)	Werner Christoph	GO	13	19	10	16	16	22	13	19	~~19~~	~~25~~	6	11.7	10	16	128.7	103.7
13	Antun Grego (YUG)	Simo Nikolic	Y	~~19~~	~~25~~	17	23	13	19	4	8	17	23	7	13	14	20	131	106
14	Neil Pryde (HKG)	Peter Gamble	KH	11	17	13	19	15	21	8	14	21	27	~~16~~	~~22~~	9	15	135	108
15	Lev Rvalov (URS)	Victor Pilchin	SR	4	8	6	11.7	12	18	~~23~~	~~29~~	18	24	23	29	12	18	137.7	108.7
16	Hans Fogh (DEN)	Niels Jensen, Poul Richard Høj Jensen	D	6	11.7	12	18	~~DSQ~~	~~38~~	7	13	12	18	11	17	DNF	36	151.7	113.7
17	Karl Geiger (AUT)	Werner Fischer	OE	~~18~~	~~24~~	15	21	10	16	16	22	16	22	12	18	11	17	140	116
18	Ben Verhagen (NED)	Nick de Jong	H	16	22	11	17	18	24	17	23	14	20	5	10	~~21~~	~~27~~	143	116
19	Carlo Massone (ITA)	Emanuele Ottonello	I	15	21	19	25	17	23	~~24~~	~~30~~	7	13	9	15	17	23	150	120
20	Lorenzo Villaseñor (MEX)	Guillermo García	MX	7	13	~~22~~	~~28~~	11	17	22	28	11	17	15	21	19	25	149	121
21	Pál Gömöry (HUN)	Szabolcs Izsák	M	8	14	~~DNF~~	~~36~~	21	27	11	17	23	29	25	31	22	28	182	146
22	George Andreadis (GRE)	Stavros Psarrakis	GR	21	27	21	27	19	25	19	25	20	26	~~DNF~~	~~36~~	15	21	187	151
23	Christian Maes (BEL)	Joël Roland	B	22	28	~~DNS~~	~~36~~	25	31	15	21	22	28	13	19	25	31	194	158
24	Andrzej Iwiński (POL)	Ludwik Raczyński	PZ	20	26	18	24	24	30	25	31	25	31	17	23	~~26~~	~~32~~	197	165
25	Rudy Thompson (ISV)	John Hamber	VI	17	23	23	29	22	28	~~27~~	~~33~~	26	32	24	30	24	30	205	172
26	William Plant (JAM)	Michael Anthony Nunes	KJ	~~DNF~~	~~36~~	DNF	36	23	29	21	27	24	30	22	28	20	26	212	176
27	Orlando Rodrigues (POR)	Adriano da Silva	P	24	30	24	30	26	32	26	32	~~DNF~~	~~36~~	19	25	23	29	214	178
28	Juan R. Torruella (PUR)	Radamés Torruella	PR	23	29	20	26	27	33	~~28~~	~~34~~	27	33	26	32	27	33	220	186
29	John Gunawan (INA)	Tan Tjong Sian	RI	26	32	25	31	28	34	~~29~~	~~35~~	28	34	28	34	28	34	234	199
30	Mario Aguilar (ESA)	Manuel Escobar	SL	25	31	~~DNF~~	~~36~~	DNF	36	DNS	36	29	35	27	33	29	35	242	206

DNF = Did Not Finish, DNS= Did Not Start, DSQ = Disqualified
= Male, = Female

=== Daily standings ===
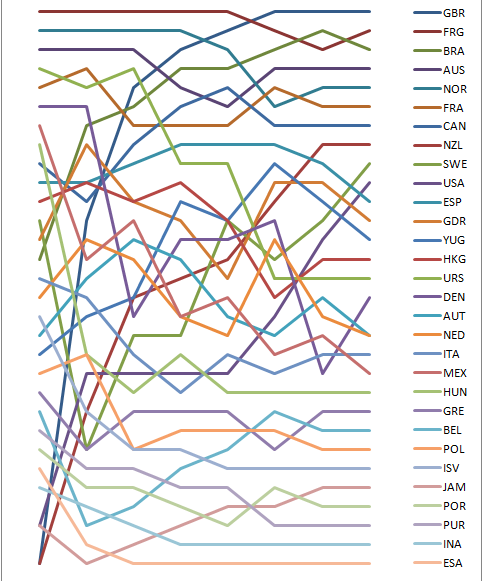
Graph showing the daily standings in the Flying Dutchman during the 1968 Summer Olympics

== Conditions at Acapulco ==
Of the total of three race areas were needed during the Olympics in Acapulco. Each of the classes was new Olympic scoring system.

Date	Race	Weather	Temperature (Celsius)	Wind direction (deg)	Wind speed (kn)	Sea	Current (kn-deg)
14 October 1968	I	Fair	34	305	15	Calm	0.5–120
15 October 1968	II	Fair	30	280	17	Calm	0.75–175
16 October 1968	III	Fair	34	265	11	Calm	0.75–135
17 October 1968	IV	Fair	29.5	200	6	Calm	0.5–115
19 October 1968	V	Normal	29.8	160	12	Calm	0.6–60
20 October 1968	VI	Fair	30	240	8	Calm	0.7–340
21 October 1968	VII	Cloudy	28.5	280	13	Choppy	0.6-135
