= Soling European Championship results (2015–2019) =

Soling European Championships

Soling
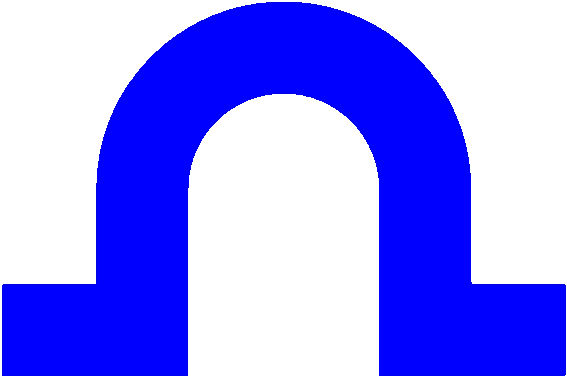

Development
- Name: Soling

The main article describes all European Soling Championships from one the first held in 1968 to the announced Championships in the near future. This article states the detailed results, where relevant the controversies, and the progression of the Championship during the series race by race of the European Soling Championships in the years 2015, 2016, 2017, 2018 and 2019. This is based on the major sources: World Sailing, the world governing body for the sport of sailing recognized by the IOC and the IPC, and the publications of the International Soling Association.

== 2015 Final results ==
2015
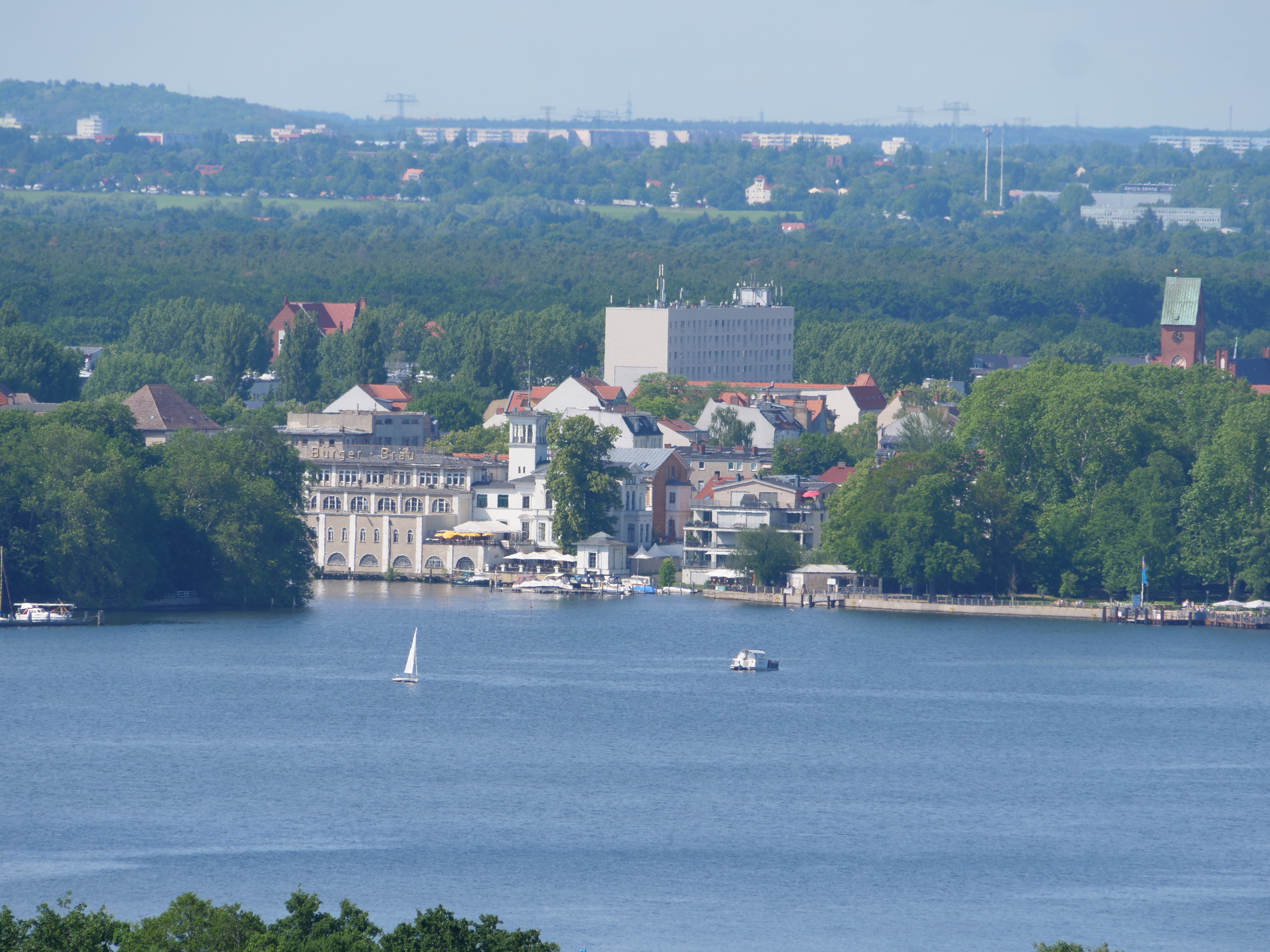

Event title
- Edition: 48
- Host: Yachtclub Berlin-Grünau e.V.

Event details
- Venue: Grünau (Berlin), Germany
- Dates: 13–19 September
- Yachts: 27
- Opening ceremony: 15 September

Competitors
- Competitors: 84
- Competing nations: 6

Results
- (gold) Gold: Germany; Jochen Schümann; Thomas Flach; Ingo Borkowski; Bernd Jäkel
- (silver) Silver: Hungary; Farkas Litkey; Károly Vezér; Gábor Oroszlán
- (bronze) Bronze: Ukraine; Igor Yushko; Serhiy Pichuhin; Igor Severianov

| Rank | Country | Helmsman | Crew | Sail No. | Race 1 | | Race 2 | | Race 3 | | Race 4 | | Race 5 | | Race 6 | | Race 7 | | Race 8 | | Race 9 | | Total | Total – discard |
| Rank | Country | Helmsman | Crew | Sail No. | Pos. | Pts. | Pos. | Pts. | Pos. | Pts. | Pos. | Pts. | Pos. | Pts. | Pos. | Pts. | Pos. | Pts. | Pos. | Pts. | Pos. | Pts. | Total | Total – discard |
| 1st place, gold medalist(s) | GER | Jochen Schümann | Thomas Flach; Ingo Borkowski (race 1–8); Bernd Jäkel (race 9) | GER 333 | 1 | 1 | ~~3~~ | ~~3~~ | 1 | 1 | 1 | 1 | 1 | 1 | 1 | 1 | 1 | 1 | 1 | 1 | 1 | 1 | 11 | 8 |
| 2nd place, silver medalist(s) | HUN | Farkas Litkey | Károly Vezér; Oroszlán Gábor | HUN 11 | 5 | 5 | 2 | 2 | 2 | 2 | 3 | 3 | 2 | 2 | 2 | 2 | 2 | 2 | 10 | 10 | ~~DNC~~ | ~~28~~ | 56 | 28 |
| 3rd place, bronze medalist(s) | UKR | Igor Yushko | Serhiy Pichuhin; Igor Severianov | UKR 1 | ~~22~~ | ~~22~~ | 1 | 1 | 6 | 6 | 5 | 5 | 4 | 4 | 5 | 5 | 4 | 4 | 6 | 6 | 5 | 5 | 58 | 36 |
| 4 | HUN | Sándor Varjas | László Kovácsi; Gábor Meretei | HUN 1 | 8 | 8 | 5 | 5 | 8 | 8 | 4 | 4 | 5 | 5 | 6 | 6 | ~~12~~ | ~~12~~ | 5 | 5 | 4 | 4 | 57 | 45 |
| 5 | GER | Karl Haist | Martin Zeileis; Irene Haist | GER 308 | ~~9~~ | ~~9~~ | 6 | 6 | 9 | 9 | 9 | 9 | 7 | 7 | 8 | 8 | 3 | 3 | 3 | 3 | 3 | 3 | 57 | 48 |
| 6 | GER | Uwe Steingroß | Karsten Eller; Tim Giesecke | GER 323 | 2 | 2 | 4 | 4 | 7 | 7 | 8 | 8 | ~~14~~ | ~~14~~ | 7 | 7 | 7 | 7 | 12 | 12 | 2 | 2 | 63 | 49 |
| 7 | GER | Hendrik Witzmann | Markus Koy; Knud Seelig | GER 25 | ~~13~~ | ~~13~~ | 11 | 11 | 10 | 10 | 2 | 2 | 3 | 3 | 3 | 3 | 5 | 5 | 11 | 11 | 11 | 11 | 69 | 56 |
| 8 | GER | Roman Koch | Thomas Olbrich; Rob Morris | GER 1 | 10 | 10 | 10 | 10 | 4 | 4 | ~~11~~ | ~~11~~ | 6 | 6 | 4 | 4 | 11 | 11 | 2 | 2 | 9 | 9 | 67 | 56 |
| 9 | NED | Rudy den Outer | Gavin Lidlow; Robin Segaar | NED 33 | 18 | 18 | 8 | 8 | 3 | 3 | 6 | 6 | ~~OCS~~ | ~~28~~ | 12 | 12 | 17 | 17 | 8 | 8 | 15 | 15 | 115 | 87 |
| 10 | GER | Michael Dietzel | Tim Schutte; Hannes Ramoser | GER 11 | 15 | 15 | 7 | 7 | 15 | 15 | 13 | 13 | 9 | 9 | 10 | 10 | 13 | 13 | ~~17~~ | ~~17~~ | 8 | 8 | 107 | 90 |
| 11 | USA | Matias Collins | François Gombeaud; Christopher Laske | USA 853 | 3 | 3 | ~~17~~ | ~~17~~ | 16 | 16 | 12 | 12 | 11 | 11 | 13 | 13 | 16 | 16 | 13 | 13 | 10 | 10 | 111 | 94 |
| 12 | GER | Daniel Diesing | Stefan Peuker; Sven Rikwald | GER 209 | 6 | 6 | 14 | 14 | 13 | 13 | ~~OCS~~ | ~~28~~ | 8 | 8 | 18 | 18 | 10 | 10 | 7 | 7 | 20 | 20 | 124 | 96 |
| 13 | GER | Holger Weichert | Laurent Scheel; Martin Setzkorn | GER 49 | 7 | 7 | 9 | 9 | 12 | 12 | 7 | 7 | DNE | 28 | 11 | 11 | 8 | 8 | 14 | 14 | ~~19~~ | ~~19~~ | 115 | 96 |
| 14 | GER | Volker Stoof | Arne Schmidt-Hess; Peter Stoof | GER 288 | 17 | 17 | 18 | 18 | 5 | 5 | 18 | 18 | 18 | 18 | ~~20~~ | ~~20~~ | 6 | 6 | 4 | 4 | 13 | 13 | 119 | 99 |
| 15 | HUN | György Wossala | Pepe Németh; Kristóf Joó | HUN 77 | 4 | 4 | ~~OCS~~ | ~~28~~ | 11 | 11 | 17 | 17 | DSQ | 28 | 14 | 14 | 14 | 14 | 9 | 9 | 6 | 6 | 131 | 103 |
| 16 | AUT | Ludwig Beurle | Eberhard Franke; Markus Gnan | AUT 102 | 14 | 14 | 20 | 20 | 22 | 22 | 10 | 10 | 13 | 13 | 9 | 9 | 9 | 9 | ~~20~~ | ~~20~~ | 14 | 14 | 131 | 109 |
| 17 | GER | Winfried Geisler | Carsten Beister; Markus Guhrs | GER 311 | 21 | 21 | 13 | 13 | 17 | 17 | 16 | 16 | 12 | 12 | 19 | 19 | 15 | 15 | ~~21~~ | ~~21~~ | 7 | 7 | 141 | 120 |
| 18 | AUT | Andreas Moosgassner | Phillip Boustnay; Peter Schaup | AUT 130 | 16 | 16 | 19 | 19 | ~~20~~ | ~~20~~ | 15 | 15 | 10 | 10 | 15 | 15 | 18 | 18 | 18 | 18 | 12 | 12 | 143 | 123 |
| 19 | GER | Peter Knauft | Mirko Jarius; Christian Kuhn | GER 225 | 19 | 19 | 12 | 12 | ~~21~~ | ~~21~~ | 14 | 14 | 15 | 15 | 16 | 16 | 20 | 20 | 15 | 15 | 16 | 16 | 148 | 127 |
| 20 | GER | Gernot Heller | Gerhard Auerswald; Leonardo Selva | GER 312 | 12 | 12 | 15 | 15 | 19 | 19 | 19 | 19 | 16 | 16 | 17 | 17 | 21 | 21 | ~~23~~ | ~~23~~ | 17 | 17 | 159 | 136 |
| 21 | HUN | Istvan Szucs | Gabor Gyulai; Peter Szucs | HUN 17 | 11 | 11 | 22 | 22 | 14 | 14 | 21 | 21 | 19 | 19 | 21 | 21 | ~~23~~ | ~~23~~ | 16 | 16 | 22 | 22 | 169 | 146 |
| 22 | GER | Günter Kring | Andreas Finck; Peter Seidlitz | GER 299 | ~~23~~ | ~~23~~ | 16 | 16 | 18 | 18 | 20 | 20 | 17 | 17 | 22 | 22 | 19 | 19 | 22 | 22 | 21 | 21 | 178 | 155 |
| 23 | GER | Rainer Lewin | Dieter Lewin; Norbert Brinkmann | GER 313 | 20 | 20 | 21 | 21 | ~~23~~ | ~~23~~ | 22 | 22 | 20 | 20 | 23 | 23 | 22 | 22 | 19 | 19 | 18 | 18 | 188 | 165 |
| 24 | GER | Lutz Rommel | Thomas Krueger; Roland Lindenblatt | GER 324 | 24 | 24 | 23 | 23 | 24 | 24 | 23 | 23 | 21 | 21 | ~~DNF~~ | ~~28~~ | 24 | 24 | 24 | 24 | OCS | 28 | 219 | 191 |
| 25 | AUT | Christian Holler | Peter Farbowski; Mattijs Holler | AUT 1 | ~~DNS~~ | ~~28~~ | DNS | 28 | DNC | 28 | DNC | 28 | DNC | 28 | DNC | 28 | DNC | 28 | DNC | 28 | DNC | 28 | 252 | 224 |
| 26 | GER | Christian Mack | Florian Lautenschlaeger; Thomas Fabry | GER 12 | ~~DNS~~ | ~~28~~ | DNS | 28 | DNC | 28 | DNC | 28 | DNC | 28 | DNC | 28 | DNC | 28 | DNC | 28 | DNC | 28 | 252 | 224 |
| 27 | GER | Emil Kuchta | Susanne Kuchta; Gudrun Kuchta | GER 213 | ~~DNS~~ | ~~28~~ | DNS | 28 | DNC | 28 | DNC | 28 | DNC | 28 | DNC | 28 | DNC | 28 | DNC | 28 | DNC | 28 | 252 | 224 |

Legend: DNC – Did not come to the starting area; DNE – Non excludable disqualification; DNF – Did not finish; DNS – Did not start; OCS – On the course side of the starting line;
Discard is crossed out and does not count for the overall result.

- 2015 Progress

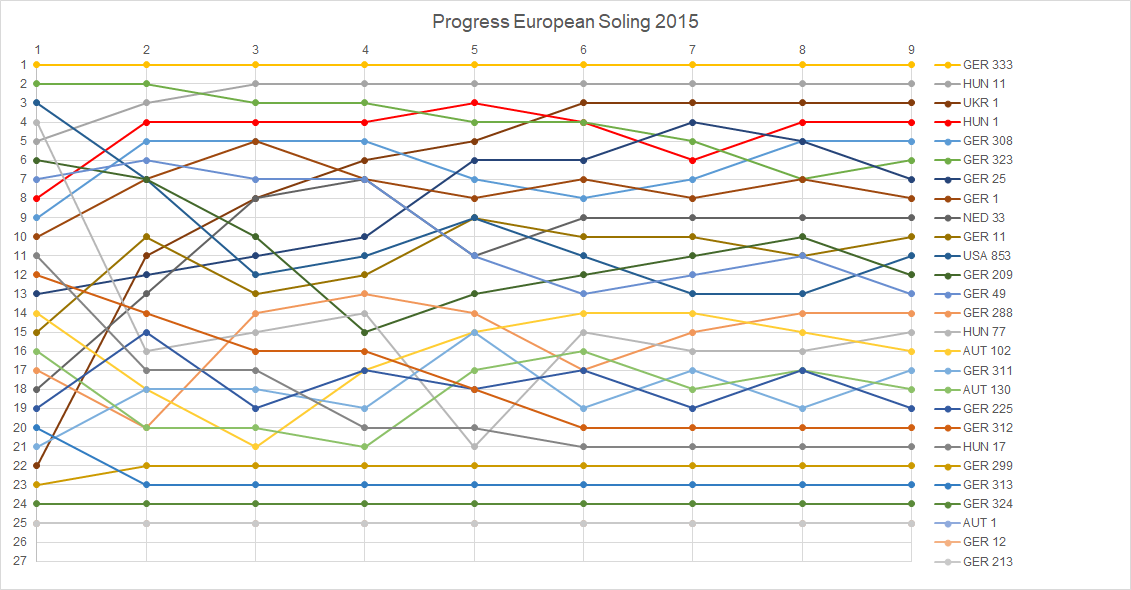

== 2016 Final results ==
2016
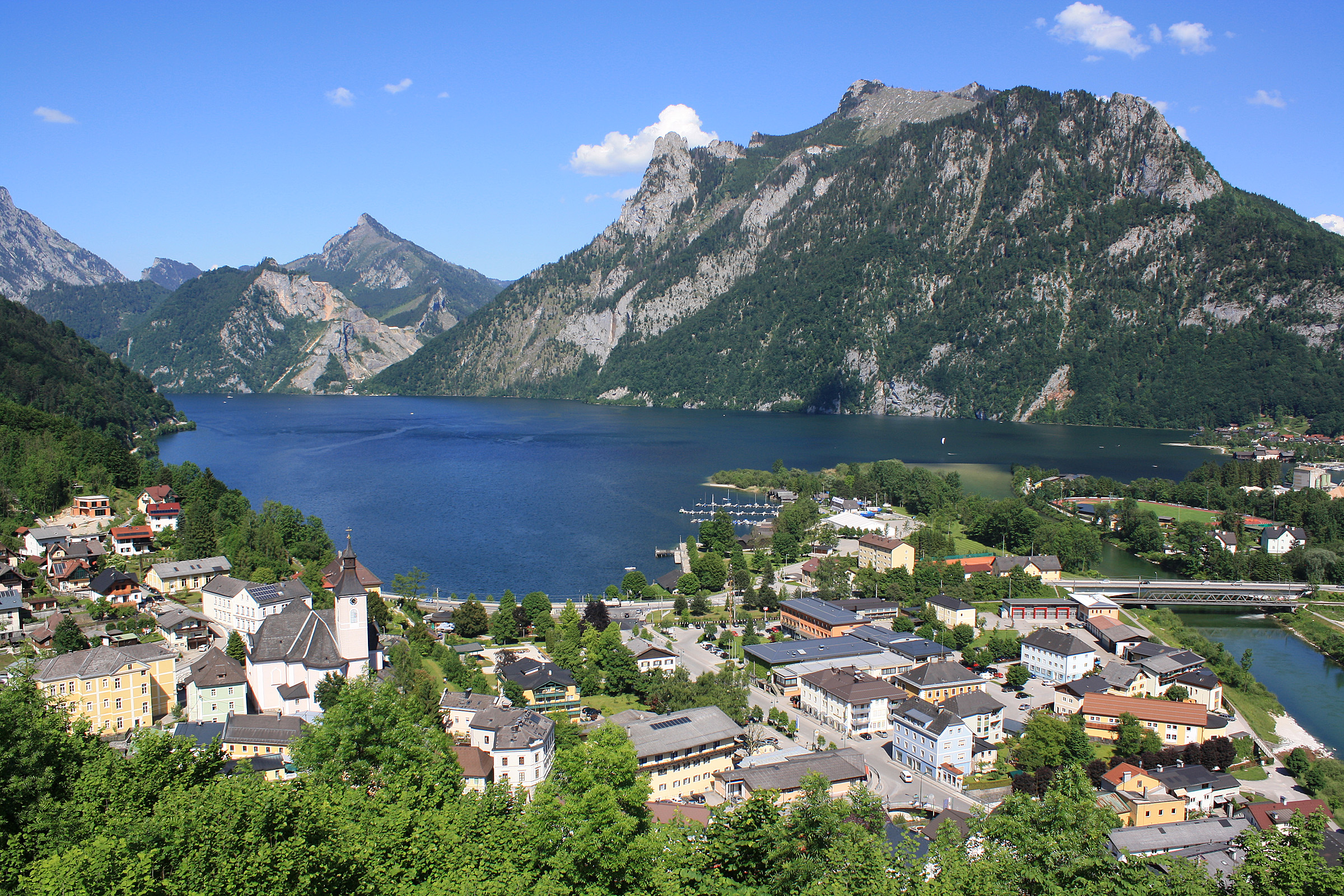

Event title
- Edition: 49
- Host: Segelclub Ebensee

Event details
- Venue: Ebensee am Traunsee, Austria
- Dates: 2–5 May
- Yachts: 35
- Opening ceremony: 1 May

Competitors
- Competitors: 105
- Competing nations: 11

Results
- (gold) Gold: Austria; Christian Binder; Christian Feitchinger; Klaus Kratochwill
- (silver) Silver: Hungary; Farkas Litkey; Kristoff Joo; Gabor Croszian
- (bronze) Bronze: Canada; Peter Hall; Will Hall; Steve Lacey

| Rank | Country | Helmsman | Crew | Sail No. | Race 1 | | Race 2 | | Race 3 | | Race 4 | | Race 5 | | Race 6 | | Race 7 | | Race 8 | | Race 9 | | Total | Total – discard |
| Rank | Country | Helmsman | Crew | Sail No. | Pos. | Pts. | Pos. | Pts. | Pos. | Pts. | Pos. | Pts. | Pos. | Pts. | Pos. | Pts. | Pos. | Pts. | Pos. | Pts. | Pos. | Pts. | Total | Total – discard |
| 1st place, gold medalist(s) | AUT | Christian Binder | Christian Feitchinger; Klaus Kratochwill | AUT 114 | 4 | 4 | 4 | 4 | 7 | 7 | 2 | 2 | 1 | 1 | 2 | 2 | ~~12~~ | ~~12~~ | 1 | 1 | 5 | 5 | 38 | 26 |
| 2nd place, silver medalist(s) | HUN | Farkas Litkey | Kristoff Joo; Gabor Croszian | HUN 11 | 3 | 3 | ~~14~~ | ~~14~~ | 1 | 1 | 1 | 1 | 2 | 2 | 6 | 6 | 6 | 6 | 4 | 4 | 3 | 3 | 40 | 26 |
| 3rd place, bronze medalist(s) | CAN | Peter Hall | William Hall; Steve Lacey | CAN 225 | 2 | 2 | 7 | 7 | 3 | 3 | ~~14~~ | ~~14~~ | 4 | 4 | 3 | 3 | 5 | 5 | 2 | 2 | 2 | 2 | 42 | 28 |
| 4 | HUN | Sándor Varjas | László Kovácsi; Gábor Meretei | HUN 1 | 5 | 5 | 3 | 3 | 2 | 2 | 4 | 4 | 3 | 3 | 5 | 5 | 22 | 22 | ~~UFD~~ | ~~36~~ | 6 | 6 | 86 | 50 |
| 5 | AUT | Florian Felzmann | Margund Schuh; Michael Felzmann | AUT 135 | 1 | 1 | 12 | 12 | 9 | 9 | 9 | 9 | ~~17~~ | ~~17~~ | 7 | 7 | 4 | 4 | 3 | 3 | 11 | 11 | 73 | 56 |
| 6 | UKR | Igor Yushko | Serhiy Pichuhin; Igor Severianov | UKR 1 | 13 | 13 | 1 | 1 | 8 | 8 | 8 | 8 | 9 | 9 | 1 | 1 | 13 | 13 | 6 | 6 | ~~14~~ | ~~14~~ | 73 | 59 |
| 7 | NED | Rudy den Outer | Rob Wapenaar; Peter Farbowski (AUT) | NED 33 | 8 | 8 | 11 | 11 | 13 | 13 | 5 | 5 | 6 | 6 | 4 | 4 | 10 | 10 | ~~UFD~~ | ~~36~~ | 9 | 9 | 102 | 66 |
| 8 | GBR | Christian Spießberger | Heino Shuckmann; Markus Stalhofer | GBR 170 | 10 | 10 | 6 | 6 | 6 | 6 | 19 | 19 | 10 | 10 | 15 | 15 | ~~21~~ | ~~21~~ | 10 | 10 | 1 | 1 | 98 | 77 |
| 9 | ESP | Jaime Alonso Allende | Cuco Gomez; Carlos Elosegui | ESP 146 | 16 | 16 | 9 | 9 | 12 | 12 | 26 | 26 | 7 | 7 | 14 | 14 | 2 | 2 | ~~DSQ~~ | ~~36~~ | 4 | 4 | 126 | 90 |
| 10 | SLO | Bostjan Antoncic | Gennadi Strakh; Mitja Nevečny | SLO 1 | 12 | 12 | 22 | 22 | 14 | 14 | 3 | 3 | 13 | 13 | 21 | 21 | 1 | 1 | ~~UFD~~ | ~~36~~ | 8 | 8 | 130 | 94 |
| 11 | USA | Charlie Kamps | Jeremy McMahon; Scott Stroud | USA 832 | ~~25~~ | ~~25~~ | 2 | 2 | 18 | 18 | 7 | 7 | 15 | 15 | 11 | 11 | 14 | 14 | 20 | 20 | 19 | 19 | 131 | 106 |
| 12 | GER | Michael Dietzel | Anna Dietzel; Hannes Ramoser | GER 11 | 6 | 6 | 16 | 16 | 4 | 4 | 25 | 25 | 18 | 18 | 12 | 12 | 9 | 9 | ~~UFD~~ | ~~36~~ | 17 | 17 | 143 | 107 |
| 13 | GER | Karl Haist | Martin Zeileis; Irene Haist | GER 308 | 7 | 7 | 10 | 10 | 5 | 5 | 10 | 10 | 27 | 27 | 19 | 19 | 18 | 18 | ~~UFD~~ | ~~36~~ | 13 | 13 | 145 | 109 |
| 14 | GER | Tim Giesecke | Sven Rikwald; Volker Stoof | GER 209 | ~~30~~ | ~~30~~ | 29 | 29 | 19 | 19 | 12 | 12 | 21 | 21 | 9 | 9 | 16 | 16 | 7 | 7 | 7 | 7 | 150 | 120 |
| 15 | FRA | Yves Steff | Yves Allain; Lous-Etienne Du Reau | FRA 182 | 15 | 15 | 15 | 15 | ~~28~~ | ~~28~~ | 13 | 13 | 8 | 8 | 23 | 23 | 15 | 15 | 13 | 13 | 22 | 22 | 152 | 124 |
| 16 | NED | Bram Soethoudt | Ronald den Arend; Hans Zijlstra | NED 38 | 9 | 9 | 25 | 25 | 16 | 16 | 18 | 18 | 19 | 19 | ~~28~~ | ~~28~~ | 11 | 11 | 16 | 16 | 15 | 15 | 157 | 129 |
| 17 | USA | Matias Collins | Andreas Baumüller; Raimund Machatschek | USA 853 | ~~22~~ | ~~22~~ | 19 | 19 | 20 | 20 | 21 | 21 | 12 | 12 | 22 | 22 | 3 | 3 | 14 | 14 | 20 | 20 | 153 | 131 |
| 18 | AUT | Andreas Blaschke | Heinz Risch; Clemens Blaschke | AUT 139 | 17 | 17 | 21 | 21 | ~~29~~ | ~~29~~ | 15 | 15 | 25 | 25 | 17 | 17 | 17 | 17 | 9 | 9 | 10 | 10 | 160 | 131 |
| 19 | GER | Matthias Dulce | Klaus Gaede; Eberhard Frank | GER 323 | ~~29~~ | ~~29~~ | 24 | 24 | 21 | 21 | 22 | 22 | 14 | 14 | 16 | 16 | 7 | 7 | 18 | 18 | 12 | 12 | 163 | 134 |
| 20 | GER | Daniel Diesing | Stefan Peuker; Andreas Finck | GER 245 | 19 | 19 | 18 | 18 | 26 | 26 | 6 | 6 | 16 | 16 | ~~DNS~~ | ~~36~~ | 8 | 8 | 11 | 11 | OCS | 36 | 176 | 140 |
| 21 | AUT | Peter Neumann | Rudolf Hubauer; Rudolf Rager | AUT 122 | 18 | 18 | 13 | 13 | 23 | 23 | ~~24~~ | ~~24~~ | 23 | 23 | 13 | 13 | 19 | 19 | 17 | 17 | 23 | 23 | 173 | 149 |
| 22 | AUT | Harald Eder | Peter Steinkogler; Josef Matrai | AUT 85 | 26 | 26 | 5 | 5 | 22 | 22 | 23 | 23 | 22 | 22 | 8 | 8 | ~~UFD~~ | ~~36~~ | 8 | 8 | OCS | 36 | 186 | 150 |
| 23 | AUT | Harald Schuh | Stephan Puxkandl; Stephen Beurle | AUT 97 | 11 | 11 | 17 | 17 | 10 | 10 | 16 | 16 | 5 | 5 | 20 | 20 | ~~DNS~~ | ~~36~~ | DNS | 36 | DNS | 36 | 187 | 151 |
| 24 | HUN | Istvan Szucs | Gabor Gyulai; Peter Szucs | HUN 17 | 14 | 14 | 8 | 8 | 24 | 24 | 28 | 28 | 11 | 11 | 10 | 10 | ~~UFD~~ | ~~36~~ | UFD | 36 | 24 | 24 | 191 | 155 |
| 25 | FRA | Marc Lefevre | François Gombeaud; Marc Furic | FRA 14 | 28 | 28 | 27 | 27 | 11 | 11 | 31 | 31 | ~~30~~ | ~~30~~ | 18 | 18 | 26 | 26 | 15 | 15 | 18 | 18 | 204 | 173 |
| 26 | USA | Stuart H. Walker | Volker Moser; Ross Dierdoff | USA 839 | 23 | 23 | 31 | 31 | 25 | 25 | 27 | 27 | 29 | 29 | 27 | 27 | ~~32~~ | ~~32~~ | 5 | 5 | 16 | 16 | 215 | 183 |
| 27 | NED | Sebastian Hopf | Gabor Helmhout; Robin de jong | NED 46 | 31 | 31 | ~~34~~ | ~~34~~ | 15 | 15 | 17 | 17 | 24 | 24 | 25 | 25 | 23 | 23 | 22 | 22 | 28 | 28 | 219 | 185 |
| 28 | AUT | Ludwig Beurle | Christian Fischer; Ekkehart Steinhuber | AUT 102 | 27 | 27 | 28 | 28 | 27 | 27 | 11 | 11 | 20 | 20 | 26 | 26 | ~~29~~ | ~~29~~ | 25 | 25 | 27 | 27 | 220 | 191 |
| 29 | USA | Henry Thomas | Christian Kalhs; Tom Mitchell | USA 798 | ~~35~~ | ~~35~~ | 20 | 20 | 17 | 17 | 20 | 20 | 26 | 26 | 31 | 31 | 31 | 31 | 21 | 21 | 25 | 25 | 226 | 191 |
| 30 | GER | Gernot Heller | Gert Auerswald; Paul Helbig | GER 312 | 24 | 24 | 23 | 23 | ~~30~~ | ~~30~~ | 29 | 29 | 28 | 28 | 24 | 24 | 20 | 20 | 19 | 19 | 26 | 26 | 223 | 193 |
| 31 | AUT | Christian Ehrenberger | Florian Ehrenberger; Egon Spendling Wimmer | AUT 104 | 21 | 21 | ~~35~~ | ~~35~~ | 32 | 32 | 32 | 32 | 32 | 32 | 30 | 30 | 28 | 28 | 12 | 12 | 31 | 31 | 253 | 218 |
| 32 | AUT | Rene Musey | Bernd Kaltenbrunner; Walter Haschka | AUT 124 | 20 | 20 | 32 | 32 | 31 | 31 | 30 | 30 | 33 | 33 | 34 | 34 | 27 | 27 | ~~DNF~~ | ~~36~~ | 21 | 21 | 264 | 228 |
| 33 | GER | Emil Kuchta | Sabine Kuchta; Susanne Kuchta | GER 243 | ~~33~~ | ~~33~~ | 33 | 33 | 33 | 33 | 33 | 33 | 31 | 31 | 29 | 29 | 24 | 24 | 23 | 23 | 30 | 30 | 269 | 236 |
| 34 | GER | Lutz Rommel | Thomas Kruger; Roland Lindenblatt | GER 324 | 32 | 32 | 26 | 26 | ~~34~~ | ~~34~~ | 34 | 34 | 34 | 34 | 32 | 32 | 25 | 25 | 24 | 24 | 32 | 32 | 273 | 239 |
| 35 | AUT | Julian Hofmaninger | Markus Schofmann; Phillipp Konrad | AUT 43 | 34 | 34 | 30 | 30 | 35 | 35 | 35 | 35 | ~~DNS~~ | ~~36~~ | 33 | 33 | 30 | 30 | 26 | 26 | 29 | 29 | 288 | 252 |

Legend: DNF – Did not finish; DNS – Did not start; DSQ – Disqualified; OCS – On the course side of the starting line; UFD – "U" flag disqualification;
Discard is crossed out and does not count for the overall result.

- 2016 Progress

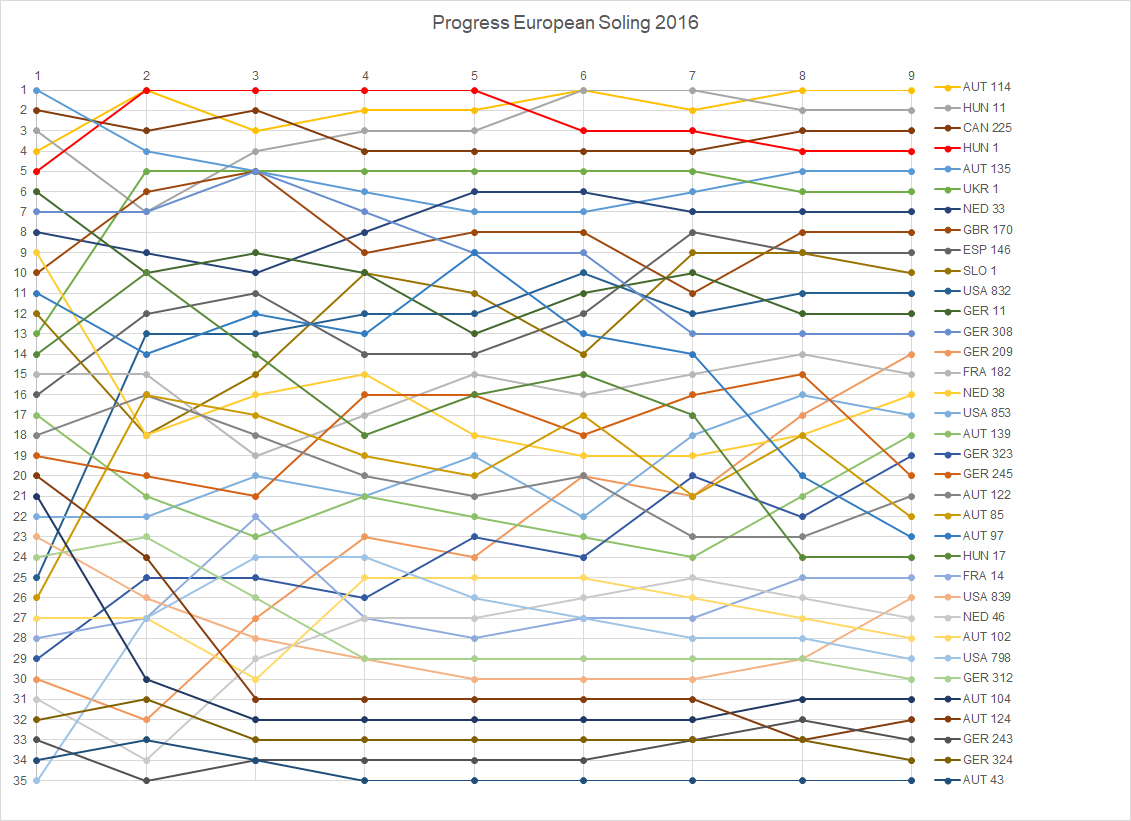

== 2017 Final results ==
2017
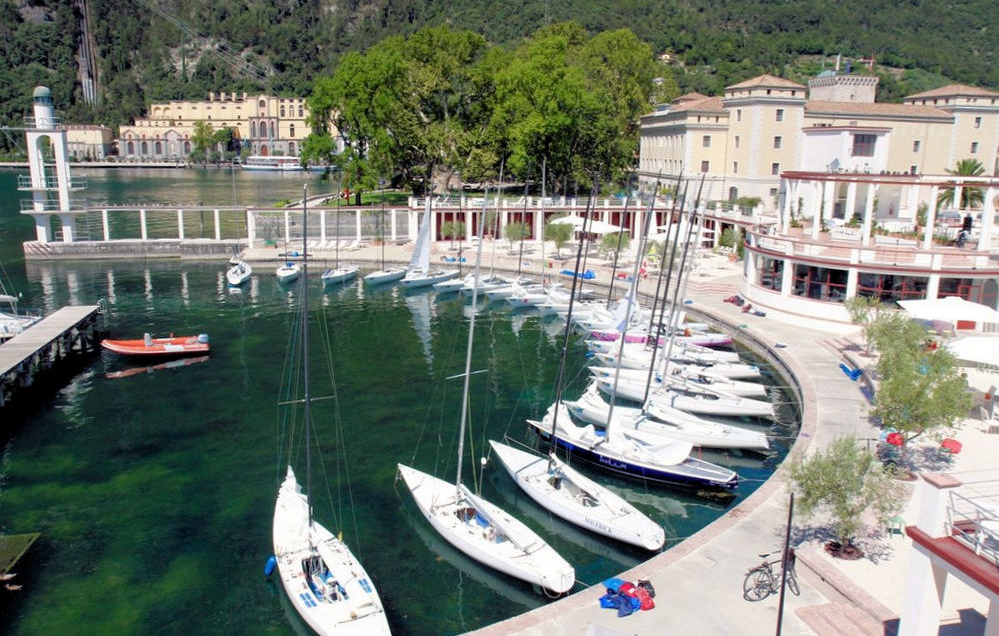

Event title
- Edition: 50
- Host: Fraglia Vela Riva (FVR)

Event details
- Venue: Riva del Garda, Italy
- Dates: 13–17 July
- Yachts: 37
- Opening ceremony: 12 July

Competitors
- Competitors: 111
- Competing nations: 11

Results
- (gold) Gold: Hungary; Farkas Litkey; Rodrigo Ferres; Miguel Lacour
- (silver) Silver: Austria; Florian Felzmann; Michael Felzmann; Margund Schuh
- (bronze) Bronze: Ukraine; Igor Yushko; Serhiy Pichuhin; Igor Severianov

| Rank | Country | Helmsman | Crew | Sail No. | Race 1 | | Race 2 | | Race 3 | | Race 4 | | Race 5 | | Race 6 | | Race 7 | | Race 8 | | Race 9 | | Total | Total – discard |
| Rank | Country | Helmsman | Crew | Sail No. | Pos. | Pts. | Pos. | Pts. | Pos. | Pts. | Pos. | Pts. | Pos. | Pts. | Pos. | Pts. | Pos. | Pts. | Pos. | Pts. | Pos. | Pts. | Total | Total – discard |
| 1st place, gold medalist(s) | HUN | Farkas Litkey | Károly Vezér; Csaba Weinhardt | HUN 11 | 7 | 7 | 1 | 1 | 2 | 2 | 3 | 3 | 2 | 2 | ~~12~~ | ~~12~~ | 4 | 4 | 8 | 8 | 2 | 2 | 41 | 29 |
| 2nd place, silver medalist(s) | AUT | Florian Felzmann | Michael Felzmann; Margund Schuh | AUT 135 | 10 | 10 | 2 | 2 | 1 | 1 | 2 | 2 | 11 | 11 | 6 | 6 | 5 | 5 | 4 | 4 | ~~13~~ | ~~13~~ | 54 | 41 |
| 3rd place, bronze medalist(s) | UKR | Igor Yushko | Serhiy Pichuhin; Igor Severianov | UKR 1 | 2 | 2 | 4 | 4 | 7 | 7 | 6 | 6 | 6 | 6 | 2 | 2 | 10 | 10 | ~~14~~ | ~~14~~ | 4 | 4 | 55 | 41 |
| 4 | CAN | Peter Hall | William Hall; Peter Farbowski | CAN 225 | ~~22~~ | ~~22~~ | 9 | 9 | 4 | 4 | 13 | 13 | 8 | 8 | 1 | 1 | 1 | 1 | 1 | 1 | 5 | 5 | 64 | 42 |
| 5 | HUN | György Wossala | Christoph Wossala; Pepe Németh | HUN 77 | 1 | 1 | ~~DSQ~~ | ~~38~~ | 3 | 3 | 1 | 1 | 7 | 7 | 22 | 22 | 9 | 9 | 3 | 3 | 11 | 11 | 95 | 57 |
| 6 | NED | Rudy den Outer | Theo de Lange; Hans Zijlstra | NED 33 | 4 | 4 | 10 | 10 | 12 | 12 | 9 | 9 | 5 | 5 | 7 | 7 | 14 | 14 | ~~19~~ | ~~19~~ | 1 | 1 | 81 | 62 |
| 7 | USA | Matias Collins | Rob Mountain; David Baum | USA 853 | 13 | 13 | ~~19~~ | ~~19~~ | 6 | 6 | 5 | 5 | 10 | 10 | 8 | 8 | 2 | 2 | 7 | 7 | 14 | 14 | 84 | 65 |
| 8 | CAN | Tom Freeman | Blair Tully; Dave Veldstra | CAN 233 | 9 | 9 | ~~20~~ | ~~20~~ | 16 | 16 | 10 | 10 | 15 | 15 | 4 | 4 | 3 | 3 | 9 | 9 | 3 | 3 | 89 | 69 |
| 9 | HUN | Sándor Varjas | László Kovácsi; Gábor Meretei | HUN 1 | 3 | 3 | 12 | 12 | ~~20~~ | ~~20~~ | 7 | 7 | 4 | 4 | 13 | 13 | 8 | 8 | 17 | 17 | 9 | 9 | 93 | 73 |
| 10 | GER | Roman Koch | Bjorn Geisler; Valentin Koch | GER 1 | 15 | 15 | 5 | 5 | 15 | 15 | ~~16~~ | ~~16~~ | 1 | 1 | 3 | 3 | 15 | 15 | 11 | 11 | 10 | 10 | 91 | 75 |
| 11 | GER | Michael Dietzel | Vera Geck; Sigrid Dietzel | GER 11 | 6 | 6 | 8 | 8 | 8 | 8 | 12 | 12 | 14 | 14 | 10 | 10 | 7 | 7 | ~~21~~ | ~~21~~ | 18 | 18 | 104 | 83 |
| 12 | SVK | Peter Mosny | Anton Szomolanyi; Marek Jankovic | SVK 1 | 26 | 26 | 6 | 6 | 5 | 5 | 11 | 11 | 3 | 3 | 15 | 15 | ~~29~~ | ~~29~~ | 16 | 16 | 7 | 7 | 118 | 89 |
| 13 | GER | Thomas Scherer | Dominik Meissner; Markus Stallhofer | GER 331 | 8 | 8 | 11 | 11 | 11 | 11 | 15 | 15 | 12 | 12 | 14 | 14 | ~~21~~ | ~~21~~ | 6 | 6 | 16 | 16 | 114 | 93 |
| 14 | ESP | Carlos Elosegui | Gomez Arisqueta Joaquin; Juan Ramón Jiménez | ESP 26 | 5 | 5 | 3 | 3 | 13 | 13 | 14 | 14 | 9 | 9 | 16 | 16 | 18 | 18 | 18 | 18 | ~~DNF~~ | ~~38~~ | 134 | 96 |
| 15 | GER | Tim Giesecke | Johannes Glitzky; Sven Rikwald | GER 209 | ~~31~~ | ~~31~~ | 16 | 16 | 22 | 22 | 4 | 4 | 21 | 21 | 23 | 23 | 6 | 6 | 2 | 2 | 12 | 12 | 137 | 106 |
| 16 | GER | Karl Haist | Martin Zeileis; Max Haist | GER 308 | 25 | 25 | 13 | 13 | 10 | 10 | 8 | 8 | 16 | 16 | ~~26~~ | ~~26~~ | 11 | 11 | 15 | 15 | 8 | 8 | 132 | 106 |
| 17 | ITA | Bruno Maffezzoli | Pierfrancesco Maffezzoli; Marco Maffezzoli | ITA 259 | 12 | 12 | 7 | 7 | ~~OCS~~ | ~~38~~ | 18 | 18 | 13 | 13 | 9 | 9 | 13 | 13 | 23 | 23 | 15 | 15 | 148 | 110 |
| 18 | AUT | Christian Feichtinger | Florian Leitner; Klaus Kratochwill | AUT 114 | 18 | 18 | ~~23~~ | ~~23~~ | 18 | 18 | 22 | 22 | 17 | 17 | 11 | 11 | 12 | 12 | 13 | 13 | 6 | 6 | 140 | 117 |
| 19 | AUT | David Schuh | Harald Schuh; Tobias Schuh | AUT 97 | 21 | 21 | 25 | 25 | 25 | 25 | 23 | 23 | 23 | 23 | 5 | 5 | ~~33~~ | ~~33~~ | 10 | 10 | 22 | 22 | 187 | 154 |
| 20 | ITA | Michele Campagnoni | Francesco Finini; Davide Arata | ITA 215 | 11 | 11 | 18 | 18 | 26 | 26 | 24 | 24 | 18 | 18 | ~~33~~ | ~~33~~ | 20 | 20 | 12 | 12 | 27 | 27 | 189 | 156 |
| 21 | NED | Han van Veen | Tom van Veen; Ralph Heemskerk | NED 49 | ~~28~~ | ~~28~~ | 21 | 21 | 9 | 9 | 17 | 17 | 22 | 22 | 20 | 20 | 24 | 24 | 28 | 28 | 25 | 25 | 194 | 166 |
| 22 | FRA | Marc Lefevre | François Gombeaud; Marc Furic | FRA 198 | 14 | 14 | 30 | 30 | 23 | 23 | 21 | 21 | 26 | 26 | 21 | 21 | 17 | 17 | ~~31~~ | ~~31~~ | 24 | 24 | 207 | 176 |
| 23 | GER | Christian Mack | Florian Lautenschlaeger; Thomas Fabry | GER 12 | ~~34~~ | ~~34~~ | 24 | 24 | 21 | 21 | 25 | 25 | 20 | 20 | 25 | 25 | 19 | 19 | 24 | 24 | 23 | 23 | 215 | 181 |
| 24 | AUT | Alex Hasch | Bernhard Kreutzer; Oskar Hasch | AUT 127 | 23 | 23 | 17 | 17 | 27 | 27 | 20 | 20 | 24 | 24 | ~~30~~ | ~~30~~ | 27 | 27 | 29 | 29 | 20 | 20 | 217 | 187 |
| 25 | ITA | Michele Tognozzi | Haakon Haraldsen; Christian Rieder | ITA 258 | 36 | 36 | 26 | 26 | 14 | 14 | ~~DNF~~ | ~~38~~ | 19 | 19 | 29 | 29 | 28 | 28 | 22 | 22 | 17 | 17 | 229 | 191 |
| 26 | AUT | Ludwig Beurle | Christian Fischer; Ekkehart Steinhuber | AUT 102 | 19 | 19 | ~~31~~ | ~~31~~ | 28 | 28 | 29 | 29 | 25 | 25 | 24 | 24 | 16 | 16 | 27 | 27 | 28 | 28 | 227 | 196 |
| 27 | ITA | Federico Boracchi | Vincenzo Greco Manuli; Andrea Negri | ITA 251 | 30 | 30 | 14 | 14 | 17 | 17 | 30 | 30 | 27 | 27 | 28 | 28 | ~~35~~ | ~~35~~ | 25 | 25 | 30 | 30 | 236 | 201 |
| 28 | GER | Matthias Dulce | Sean O'Meara; Eberhard Franke | GER 323 | 32 | 32 | ~~33~~ | ~~33~~ | 24 | 24 | 28 | 28 | 29 | 29 | 18 | 18 | 23 | 23 | 26 | 26 | 21 | 21 | 234 | 201 |
| 29 | HUN | Istvan Szucs | Gabor Gyulai; Peter Szucs | HUN 17 | 17 | 17 | 28 | 28 | 19 | 19 | 27 | 27 | 31 | 31 | ~~35~~ | ~~35~~ | 30 | 30 | 34 | 34 | 19 | 19 | 240 | 205 |
| 30 | ESP | Francisco Villa | Miguel Martinez; Miguel Allo | ESP 46 | 20 | 20 | 32 | 32 | 32 | 32 | ~~DNF~~ | ~~38~~ | DNS | 38 | 19 | 19 | 22 | 22 | 5 | 5 | DNF | 38 | 244 | 206 |
| 31 | ITA | Fabio Armellini | Attilia Papini; Nicola Armellini | ITA 241 | 33 | 33 | 34 | 34 | 30 | 30 | 26 | 26 | ~~DNS~~ | ~~38~~ | 17 | 17 | 26 | 26 | 20 | 20 | 26 | 26 | 250 | 212 |
| 32 | NED | Ben Boogaerdt | Gerben den Hartog; Karsten Kraan | NED 37 | 27 | 27 | 27 | 27 | 31 | 31 | 19 | 19 | 28 | 28 | 32 | 32 | 25 | 25 | ~~36~~ | ~~36~~ | 29 | 29 | 254 | 218 |
| 33 | GER | Gernot Heller | Gerhard Auerswald; Frank Gundlach | GER 312 | 29 | 29 | 15 | 15 | 29 | 29 | 31 | 31 | 30 | 30 | 31 | 31 | 34 | 34 | 32 | 32 | ~~DNF~~ | ~~38~~ | 269 | 231 |
| 34 | AUT | Johann Kalhs | Nikolaus Kalhs; Tamara Kalhs | AUT 136 | 24 | 24 | 35 | 35 | ~~DNF~~ | ~~38~~ | 32 | 32 | 33 | 33 | 27 | 27 | 32 | 32 | 30 | 30 | 32 | 32 | 283 | 245 |
| 35 | ITA | Alberto De Amicis | Monica Cameroni; Marco De Amicis | ITA 252 | 35 | 35 | 22 | 22 | 34 | 34 | ~~DNF~~ | ~~38~~ | DNS | 38 | 34 | 34 | 31 | 31 | 33 | 33 | 31 | 31 | 296 | 258 |
| 36 | AUT | Hermann Beurle | Stephan Beurle; Veronika Beurle | AUT 185 | 16 | 16 | 29 | 29 | ~~OCS~~ | ~~38~~ | DNF | 38 | DNS | 38 | DNC | 38 | DNC | 38 | DNC | 38 | DNC | 38 | 311 | 273 |
| 37 | NED | Danker Rijk | Danker Rijk Jr. Arko Hoondert | NED 48 | ~~37~~ | ~~37~~ | 36 | 36 | 33 | 33 | 33 | 33 | 32 | 32 | 36 | 36 | 36 | 36 | 35 | 35 | 33 | 33 | 311 | 274 |

Legend: DNC – Did not come to the starting area; DNF – Did not finish; DSQ – Disqualified; OCS – On the course side of the starting line;
Discard is crossed out and does not count for the overall result.

- 2017 Progress

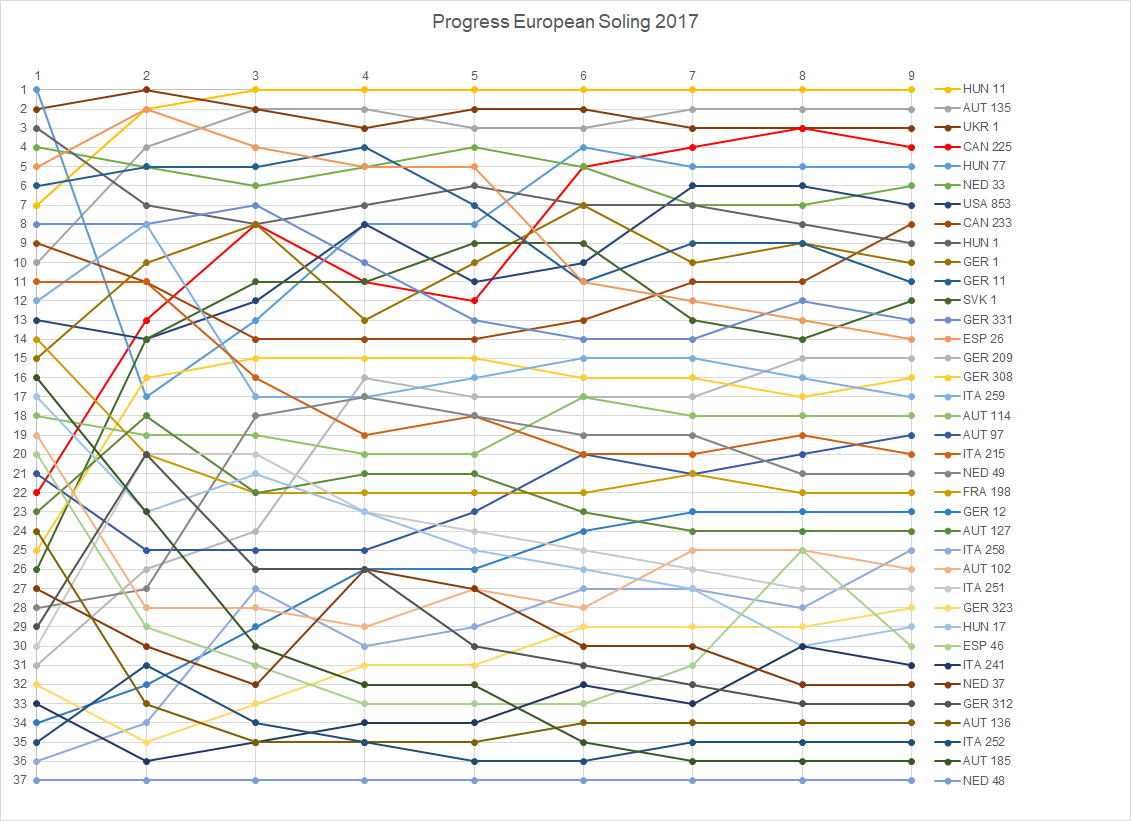

== 2018 Final results ==
2018
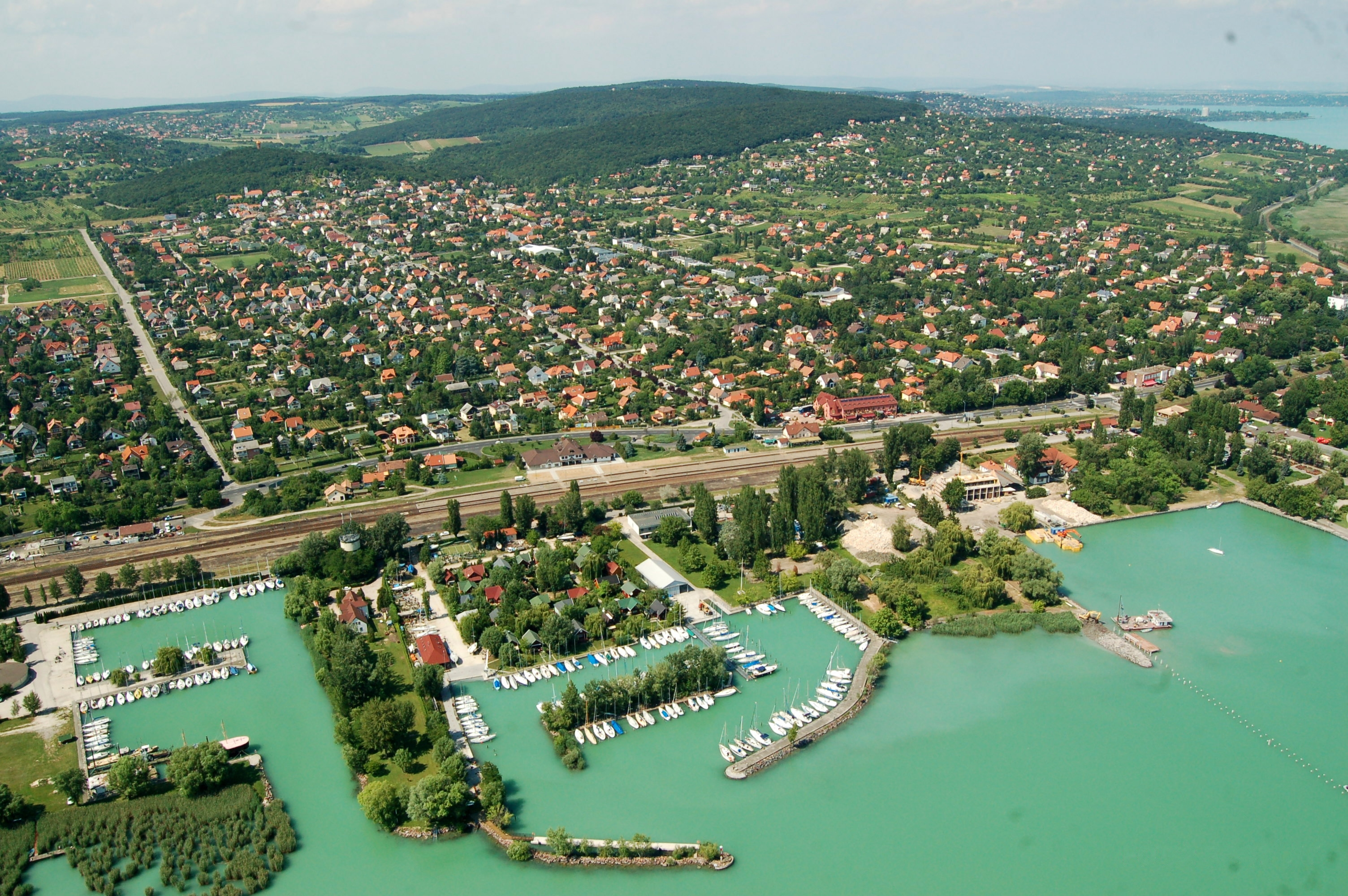

Event title
- Edition: 51
- Host: Alsóőrs Marina

Event details
- Venue: Alsóörs, Hungary
- Dates: 1–5 May
- Yachts: 22
- Opening ceremony: 30 April

Competitors
- Competitors: 66
- Competing nations: 9

Results
- (gold) Gold: Hungary; Sándor Varjas; László Kovácsi; Gábor Meretei
- (silver) Silver: Hungary; György Wossala; Pepe Németh; Christoph Wossala
- (bronze) Bronze: Hungary; Annamária Sabján; Bea Majoross; András Bajusz

| Rank | Country | Helmsman | Crew | Sail No. | Race 1 | | Race 2 | | Race 3 | | Race 4 | | Race 5 | | Race 6 | | Race 7 | | Race 8 | | Race 9 | | Total | Total – discard |
| Rank | Country | Helmsman | Crew | Sail No. | Pos. | Pts. | Pos. | Pts. | Pos. | Pts. | Pos. | Pts. | Pos. | Pts. | Pos. | Pts. | Pos. | Pts. | Pos. | Pts. | Pos. | Pts. | Total | Total – discard |
| 1st place, gold medalist(s) | HUN | Sándor Varjas | László Kovácsi; Gábor Meretei | HUN 1 | 1 | 1 | ~~OCS~~ | ~~23~~ | 1 | 1 | 6 | 6 | 1 | 1 | 3 | 3 | 1 | 1 | 2 | 2 | 6 | 6 | 44 | 21 |
| 2nd place, silver medalist(s) | HUN | György Wossala | Pepe Németh; Christoph Wossala | HUN 77 | ~~12~~ | ~~12~~ | 1 | 1 | 2 | 2 | 11 | 11 | 8 | 8 | 2 | 2 | 3 | 3 | 3 | 3 | 4 | 4 | 46 | 34 |
| 3rd place, bronze medalist(s) | HUN | Annamária Sabján | Bea Majoross; András Bajusz | HUN 11 | 8 | 8 | 3 | 3 | 3 | 3 | 1 | 1 | 3 | 3 | 7 | 7 | 9 | 9 | ~~10~~ | ~~10~~ | 8 | 8 | 52 | 42 |
| 4 | UKR | Igor Yushko | Serhiy Pichuhin; Alexey Kurilenko | UKR 1 | 3 | 3 | 9 | 9 | 11 | 11 | 4 | 4 | 5 | 5 | ~~17~~ | ~~17~~ | 2 | 2 | 4 | 4 | 5 | 5 | 60 | 43 |
| 5 | FIN | Eki Heinonen | Gabor Helmhout; Jenny van der Werf | FIN 46 | 2 | 2 | ~~OCS~~ | ~~23~~ | 8 | 8 | 12 | 12 | 7 | 7 | 9 | 9 | 5 | 5 | 1 | 1 | 1 | 1 | 68 | 45 |
| 6 | DEN | Mogens Jørgensen | Kim Joergensen; Flemming Jensen | DEN 128 | 4 | 4 | 6 | 6 | 9 | 9 | 8 | 8 | ~~15~~ | ~~15~~ | 6 | 6 | 4 | 4 | 5 | 5 | 3 | 3 | 60 | 45 |
| 7 | GER | Michael Dietzel | Hannes Ramoser; Anna Dietzel | GER 11 | 5 | 5 | 2 | 2 | 6 | 6 | 2 | 2 | 6 | 6 | 13 | 13 | 10 | 10 | ~~14~~ | ~~14~~ | 2 | 2 | 60 | 46 |
| 8 | NED | Rudy den Outer | Theo de Lange; Rob Verburg | NED 33 | 6 | 6 | 11 | 11 | ~~13~~ | ~~13~~ | 3 | 3 | 12 | 12 | 1 | 1 | 11 | 11 | 7 | 7 | 7 | 7 | 71 | 58 |
| 9 | GER | Roman Koch | Martin Zeileis; Valentin Koch | GER 1 | 9 | 9 | 4 | 4 | 5 | 5 | 5 | 5 | ~~16~~ | ~~16~~ | 4 | 4 | 13 | 13 | 8 | 8 | 11 | 11 | 75 | 59 |
| 10 | NED | Bram Soethoudt | Damian Meys; Geert Verheij | NED 38 | 7 | 7 | 10 | 10 | 2 | 2 | 11 | 11 | 8 | 8 | ~~15~~ | ~~15~~ | 7 | 7 | 12 | 12 | 12 | 12 | 84 | 69 |
| 11 | AUT | Andreas Moosgassner | Phillip Boustnay; Peter Schaup | AUT 130 | 11 | 11 | 8 | 8 | 10 | 10 | 9 | 9 | 4 | 4 | ~~19~~ | ~~19~~ | 12 | 12 | 6 | 6 | 14 | 14 | 93 | 74 |
| 12 | GER | Christian Mack | Christan Kahls; Thomas Fábry | GER 2 | 7 | 7 | 5 | 5 | 4 | 4 | ~~16~~ | ~~16~~ | 10 | 10 | 19 | 19 | 12 | 12 | 13 | 13 | 10 | 10 | 96 | 77 |
| 13 | USA | Matias Collins | Robert Mountain; Jonas Ballenberger | USA 853 | 15 | 15 | 7 | 7 | 7 | 7 | 10 | 10 | 13 | 13 | 8 | 8 | ~~15~~ | ~~15~~ | 11 | 11 | 15 | 15 | 101 | 86 |
| 14 | CAN | William Haliburton | Mike Evans; Simon Zeh | CAN 236 | 13 | 13 | 12 | 12 | ~~16~~ | ~~16~~ | 15 | 15 | 9 | 9 | 11 | 11 | 8 | 8 | 9 | 9 | 9 | 9 | 102 | 86 |
| 15 | HUN | Istvan Szucs | Gabor Gyulai; Peter Szucs | HUN 17 | 16 | 16 | 17 | 17 | 17 | 17 | ~~19~~ | ~~19~~ | 14 | 14 | 5 | 5 | 14 | 14 | 16 | 16 | 17 | 17 | 135 | 116 |
| 16 | DEN | Eli Schroeder | Bjarne Nielsen; Lars Østergaard | DEN 127 | ~~18~~ | ~~18~~ | 13 | 13 | 18 | 18 | 14 | 14 | 11 | 11 | 14 | 14 | 17 | 17 | 17 | 17 | 13 | 13 | 135 | 117 |
| 17 | NED | Ben Boogaerdt | Gerben den Hartog; Kraan Karsten | NED 37 | 14 | 14 | 16 | 16 | ~~19~~ | ~~19~~ | 13 | 13 | 18 | 18 | 10 | 10 | 16 | 16 | 18 | 18 | 16 | 16 | 140 | 121 |
| 18 | GER | Gernot Heller | Gerhard Auerswald; Frank Gundlach | GER 312 | 17 | 17 | 14 | 14 | 12 | 12 | 18 | 18 | 17 | 17 | 12 | 12 | 20 | 20 | 15 | 15 | ~~DNC~~ | ~~23~~ | 148 | 125 |
| 19 | DEN | Ole Buskbjerg | Jan Elling; Martin Klein | DEN 129 | 20 | 20 | 15 | 15 | 15 | 15 | 17 | 17 | 20 | 20 | 18 | 18 | 18 | 18 | ~~DNC~~ | ~~23~~ | DNC | 23 | 169 | 146 |
| 20 | NED | Peter Verboom | Mart Leenaars; Ilse Verboom | NED 53 | 19 | 19 | 18 | 18 | 21 | 21 | ~~20~~ | ~~20~~ | 19 | 19 | 16 | 16 | 19 | 19 | 19 | 19 | 18 | 18 | 169 | 148 |
| 21 | NED | Ronald Backer Dirks | Nickel Koch; Sigrid Dietzel | NED 51 | ~~21~~ | ~~21~~ | 19 | 19 | 20 | 20 | 21 | 21 | 21 | 21 | 21 | 21 | 21 | 21 | 20 | 20 | 19 | 19 | 183 | 162 |
| 22 | NED | Han van Veen | Benjamin Verboom; Nicky van Zon | NED 49 | ~~RET~~ | ~~23~~ | RET | 23 | RET | 23 | RET | 23 | RET | 23 | RET | 23 | RET | 23 | RET | 23 | RET | 23 | 207 | 184 |

Legend: DNF – Did not finish; OCS – On the course side of the starting line;
Discard is crossed out and does not count for the overall result.

- 2018 Progress

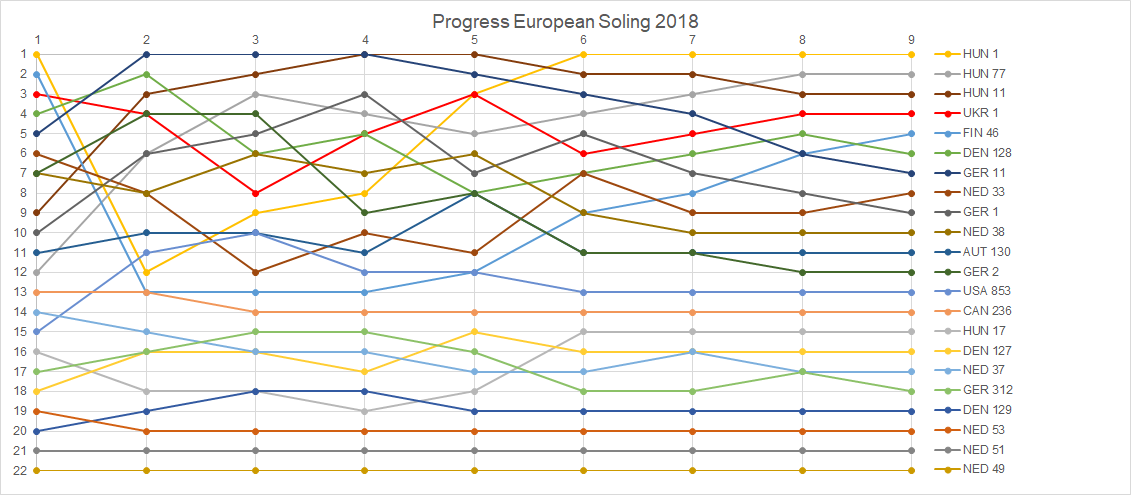

== 2019 Final results ==
2019
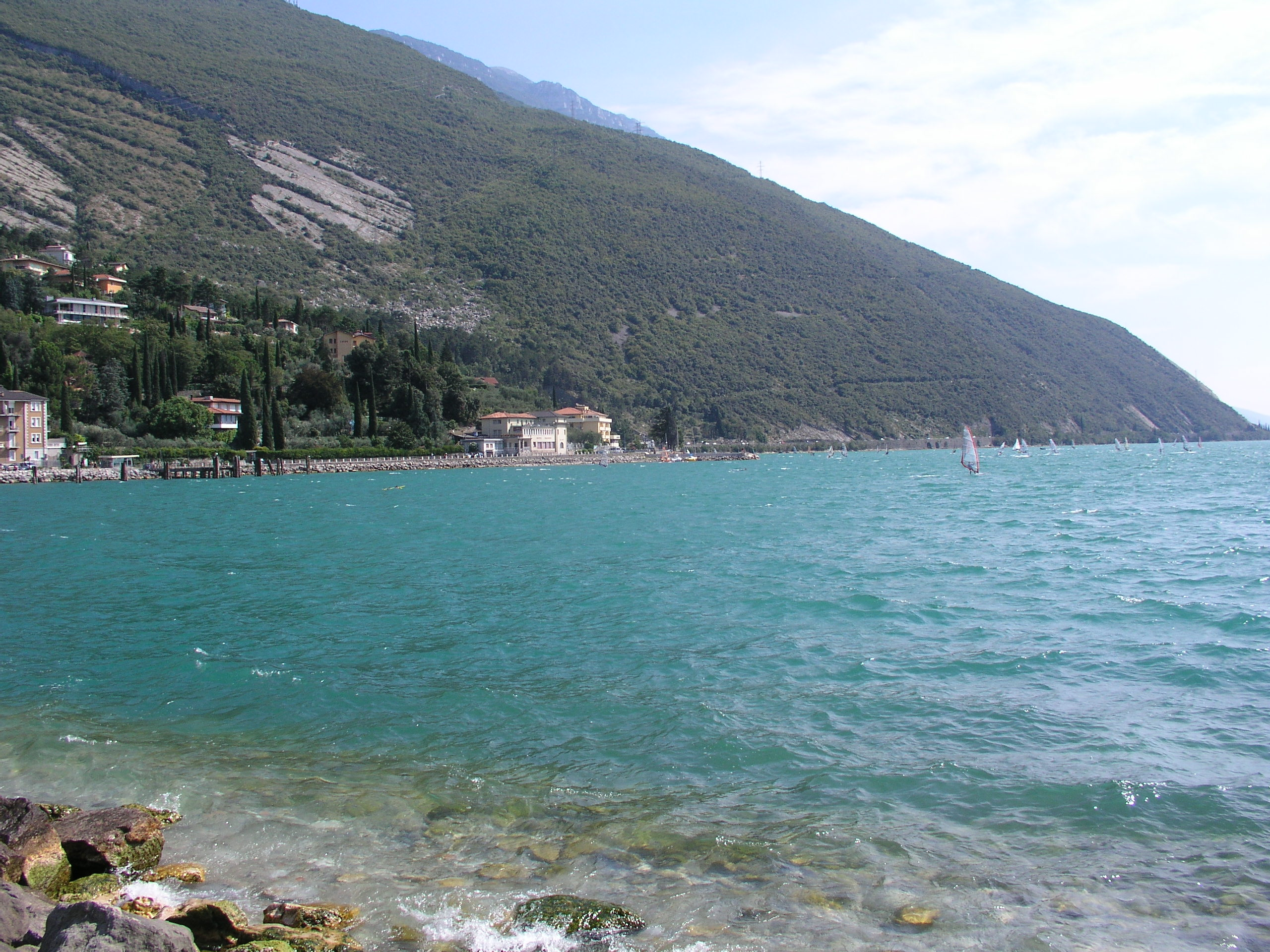

Event title
- Edition: 52
- Host: Circolo Vela Torbole

Event details
- Venue: Torbole, Italy
- Dates: 25–29 June
- Yachts: 32
- Opening ceremony: 24 June

Competitors
- Competitors: 96
- Competing nations: 11

Results
- (gold) Gold: Finland; Eki Heinonen; Gabor Helmhout; Mathias Heinonen
- (silver) Silver: Hungary; Sándor Varjas; László Kovácsi; Gábor Meretei
- (bronze) Bronze: Austria; Florian Felzmann; Michael Felzmann; Markus Gnan

| Rank | Country | Helmsman | Crew | Sail No. | Race 1 | | Race 2 | | Race 3 | | Race 4 | | Race 5 | | Race 6 | | Race 7 | | Race 8 | | Race 9 | | Total | Total – discard |
| Rank | Country | Helmsman | Crew | Sail No. | Pos. | Pts. | Pos. | Pts. | Pos. | Pts. | Pos. | Pts. | Pos. | Pts. | Pos. | Pts. | Pos. | Pts. | Pos. | Pts. | Pos. | Pts. | Total | Total – discard |
| 1st place, gold medalist(s) | FIN | Eki Heinonen | Gabor Helmhout; Mathias Heinonen | FIN 46 | 1 | 1 | 3 | 3 | ~~11~~ | ~~11~~ | 6 | 6 | 2 | 2 | 1 | 1 | 3 | 3 | 1 | 1 | 1 | 1 | 29 | 18 |
| 2nd place, silver medalist(s) | HUN | Sándor Varjas | László Kovácsi; Gábor Meretei | HUN 1 | ~~11~~ | ~~11~~ | 1 | 1 | 5 | 5 | 3 | 3 | 3 | 3 | 6 | 6 | 4 | 4 | 3 | 3 | 3 | 3 | 39 | 28 |
| 3rd place, bronze medalist(s) | AUT | Florian Felzmann | Michael Felzmann; Markus Gnan | AUT 7 | 3 | 3 | 6 | 6 | 4 | 4 | ~~11~~ | ~~11~~ | 5 | 5 | 5 | 5 | 1 | 1 | 2 | 2 | 4 | 4 | 41 | 30 |
| 4 | GER | Roman Koch | Felix Kling; Lukas Neun | GER 1 | 5 | 5 | 4 | 4 | 9 | 9 | 8 | 8 | ~~17~~ | ~~17~~ | 2 | 2 | 6 | 6 | 4 | 4 | 7 | 7 | 62 | 45 |
| 5 | UKR | Igor Yushko | Serhiy Pichuhin; Sergej Ivansits | UKR 1 | 9 | 9 | ~~11~~ | ~~11~~ | 3 | 3 | 5 | 5 | 1 | 1 | 9 | 9 | 10 | 10 | 7 | 7 | 2 | 2 | 57 | 46 |
| 6 | CAN | Peter Hall | Will Hall; Martin Robitaille | CAN 225 | 7 | 7 | 2 | 2 | 10 | 10 | 2 | 2 | ~~19~~ | ~~19~~ | 7 | 7 | 16 | 16 | 6 | 6 | 5 | 5 | 74 | 55 |
| 7 | SLO | Bostjan Antoncic | Gennadi Strakh; Gregor Rejec | SLO 1 | 22 | 22 | ~~OCS~~ | ~~33~~ | 7 | 7 | 1 | 1 | 4 | 4 | 8 | 8 | 2 | 2 | 9 | 9 | 6 | 6 | 92 | 59 |
| 8 | GER | Karl Haist | Martin Zeileis; Irene Haist | GER 308 | 2 | 2 | 8 | 8 | 1 | 1 | 18 | 18 | 7 | 7 | 4 | 4 | 8 | 8 | ~~DNF~~ | ~~33~~ | 15 | 15 | 96 | 63 |
| 9 | NED | Rudy den Outer | Theo de Lange; Ramzi Souli | NED 33 | 4 | 4 | 7 | 7 | 2 | 2 | ~~22~~ | ~~22~~ | 12 | 12 | 19 | 19 | 9 | 9 | 8 | 8 | 12 | 12 | 95 | 73 |
| 10 | HUN | György Wossala | Christoph Wossala; Konstantin Wossala | HUN 77 | 16 | 16 | 5 | 5 | ~~29~~ | ~~29~~ | 7 | 7 | 28 | 28 | 3 | 3 | 5 | 5 | 10 | 10 | 9 | 9 | 112 | 83 |
| 11 | GER | Christian Mack | Florian Lautenschlaeger; Christian Kalhs | GER 2 | ~~21~~ | ~~21~~ | 9 | 9 | 13 | 13 | 4 | 4 | 16 | 16 | 16 | 16 | 11 | 11 | 5 | 5 | 11 | 11 | 106 | 85 |
| 12 | USA | Matias Collins | Andreas Baumueller; Rodolfo Galloni | USA 853 | ~~25~~ | ~~25~~ | 13 | 13 | 18 | 18 | 14 | 14 | 10 | 10 | 10 | 10 | 7 | 7 | 17 | 17 | 8 | 8 | 122 | 97 |
| 13 | GER | Heino Schuckmann | Markus Marquardt; Markus Stallhofer | GER 331 | 12 | 12 | 12 | 12 | 6 | 6 | ~~23~~ | ~~23~~ | 20 | 20 | 12 | 12 | 13 | 13 | 15 | 15 | 19 | 19 | 132 | 109 |
| 14 | AUT | Christian Feichtinger | Florian Leitner; Klaus kratochwill | AUT 114 | 6 | 6 | ~~RET~~ | ~~33~~ | 12 | 12 | 19 | 19 | DSQ | 33 | 14 | 14 | 12 | 12 | 11 | 11 | 10 | 10 | 150 | 117 |
| 15 | ITA | Bruno Maffezzoli | Pier Francesco Maffezzoli; Gianni Morando | ITA 259 | 8 | 8 | 18 | 18 | 15 | 15 | 9 | 9 | 8 | 8 | 17 | 17 | ~~DNS~~ | ~~33~~ | 14 | 14 | DNS | 33 | 155 | 122 |
| 16 | NED | Nynke Verwoerd | Kai Spruijt; Stijn Kruijt | NED 44 | 13 | 13 | ~~27~~ | ~~27~~ | 14 | 14 | 10 | 10 | 25 | 25 | 24 | 24 | 14 | 14 | 12 | 12 | 16 | 16 | 155 | 128 |
| 17 | GER | Matthias Dulce | Simon Zeh; Eberhart Franke | GER 323 | 17 | 17 | 14 | 14 | 17 | 17 | 25 | 25 | 6 | 6 | 13 | 13 | ~~DNS~~ | ~~33~~ | 22 | 22 | 22 | 22 | 169 | 136 |
| 18 | NED | Bram Soethoudt | Eric Hoeboer; Sjors Hersberg | NED 38 | 15 | 15 | 15 | 15 | 16 | 16 | 28 | 28 | 23 | 23 | ~~29~~ | ~~29~~ | 15 | 15 | 13 | 13 | 14 | 14 | 168 | 139 |
| 19 | GER | Michael Dietzel | Anna Dietzel; Susanne Küffer | GER 11 | ~~DNF~~ | ~~33~~ | 20 | 20 | 23 | 23 | 12 | 12 | 13 | 13 | 18 | 18 | 23 | 23 | 18 | 18 | 13 | 13 | 173 | 140 |
| 20 | USA | David Crysdale | Christian Cushman; Wataru Kondo | USA 824 | 10 | 10 | 25 | 25 | 20 | 20 | 21 | 21 | 9 | 9 | 11 | 11 | 24 | 24 | ~~28~~ | ~~28~~ | 21 | 21 | 169 | 141 |
| 21 | CAN | William Haliburton | Bryan Milne; Terry Booth | CAN 236 | 14 | 14 | 10 | 10 | ~~RET~~ | ~~33~~ | 15 | 15 | 22 | 22 | 15 | 15 | 20 | 20 | 21 | 21 | DNF | 33 | 183 | 150 |
| 22 | NED | Peter Verboom | Mart Leenaars; Ilse Verboom | NED 53 | 20 | 20 | 16 | 16 | 8 | 8 | 24 | 24 | 14 | 14 | ~~25~~ | ~~25~~ | 21 | 21 | 25 | 25 | 23 | 23 | 176 | 151 |
| 23 | ITA | Fabio Armellini | Attilia Papini; Nicola Armellini | ITA 241 | ~~DNF~~ | ~~33~~ | 17 | 17 | 25 | 25 | 20 | 20 | 21 | 21 | 23 | 23 | 17 | 17 | 16 | 16 | 20 | 20 | 192 | 159 |
| 24 | NED | Han van Veen | Maryn Wilkes; Nickel Koch | NED 49 | 18 | 18 | ~~29~~ | ~~29~~ | 22 | 22 | 16 | 16 | 11 | 11 | 21 | 21 | 26 | 26 | 27 | 27 | 26 | 26 | 196 | 167 |
| 25 | NED | Ben Boogaerdt | Gerben den Hartog; Carl von Lindern | NED 37 | 24 | 24 | 19 | 19 | 19 | 19 | 26 | 26 | 15 | 15 | 20 | 20 | 19 | 19 | ~~30~~ | ~~30~~ | 25 | 25 | 197 | 167 |
| 26 | ITA | Michele Compagnoni | Fede Compagnoni; Davide Arata | ITA 213 | 19 | 19 | 21 | 21 | 27 | 27 | 17 | 17 | 26 | 26 | ~~30~~ | ~~30~~ | 22 | 22 | 19 | 19 | 18 | 18 | 199 | 169 |
| 27 | NED | Danker Rijk | Danker Rijk Jr. Arko Hoondert | NED 48 | 26 | 26 | 24 | 24 | 21 | 21 | ~~30~~ | ~~30~~ | 30 | 30 | 22 | 22 | 18 | 18 | 20 | 20 | 17 | 17 | 208 | 178 |
| 28 | FRA | Jean-Marie le Guillou | François Gombeaud; Christophe Hinfray | FRA 164 | 23 | 23 | 23 | 23 | 24 | 24 | 13 | 13 | 27 | 27 | ~~DSQ~~ | ~~33~~ | 27 | 27 | 26 | 26 | DNF | 33 | 229 | 196 |
| 29 | ITA | Alberto De Amicis | Vincenzo Manuli; Marco De Amicis | ITA 252 | ~~29~~ | ~~29~~ | 26 | 26 | 26 | 26 | 27 | 27 | 18 | 18 | 26 | 26 | 28 | 28 | 24 | 24 | 24 | 24 | 228 | 199 |
| 30 | NOR | Hans Jostad | Karl Henrik Mokkelbost; Marius Mathisen Søvik | NOR 150 | 28 | 28 | 30 | 30 | 31 | 31 | ~~32~~ | ~~32~~ | 29 | 29 | 27 | 27 | 25 | 25 | 23 | 23 | 27 | 27 | 252 | 220 |
| 31 | AUT | Ekkehart Steinhuber | Stephan Beurle; Philipp Weis | AUT 86 | 27 | 27 | 22 | 22 | 28 | 28 | 31 | 31 | 24 | 24 | 28 | 28 | 29 | 29 | ~~DNF~~ | ~~33~~ | DNS | 33 | 255 | 222 |
| 32 | NOR | Christian Rieder | Kjell Arne Haakonsen; Jens Petter Andresen | NOR 111 | 30 | 30 | 28 | 28 | 30 | 30 | 29 | 29 | 31 | 31 | ~~DNS~~ | ~~33~~ | DNS | 33 | 29 | 29 | 28 | 28 | 271 | 238 |

Legend: DNF – Did not finish; DNS – Did not start; DSQ – Disqualified; RET – Retired;
Discard is crossed out and does not count for the overall result.

- 2019 Progress

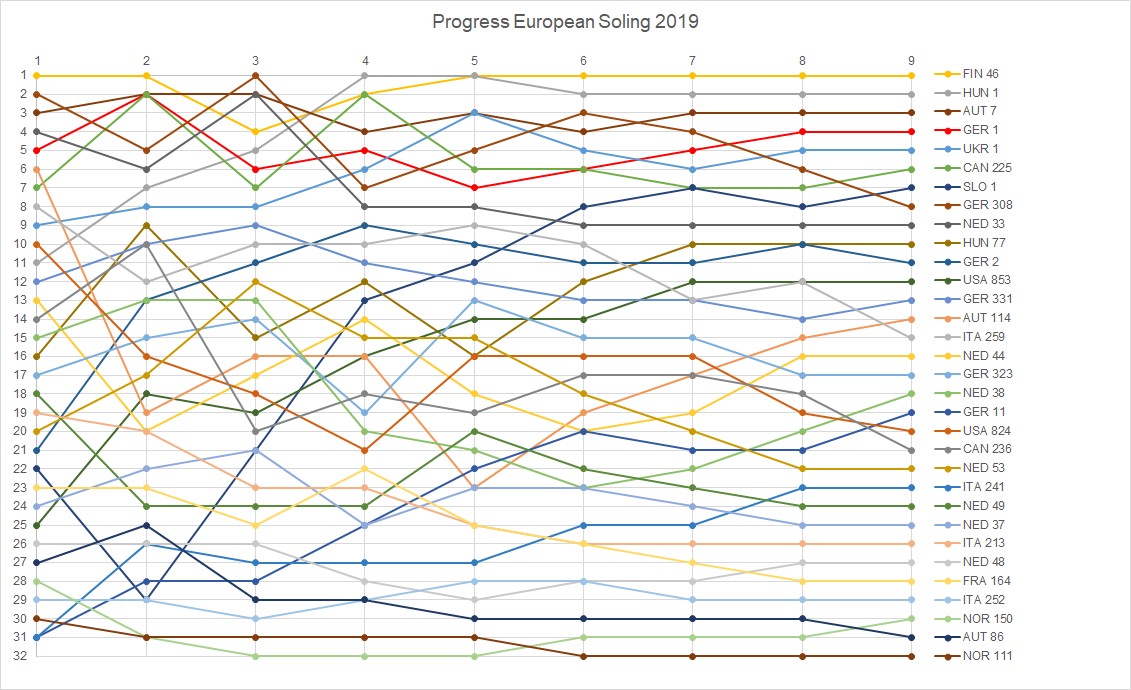

== Further results ==
For further results see:

- Soling European Championship results (1968–1979)
- Soling European Championship results (1980–1984)
- Soling European Championship results (1985–1989)
- Soling European Championship results (1990–1994)
- Soling European Championship results (1995–1999)
- Soling European Championship results (2000–2004)
- Soling European Championship results (2005–2009)
- Soling European Championship results (2010–2014)
- Soling European Championship results (2015–2019)
- Soling European Championship results (2020–2024)
