= Peter Gamble =

Peter Gamble may refer to:

- Peter Gamble (naval officer), U.S. Navy officer
- Peter Gamble (sailor), Hong Kong Olympic sailor
- Peter Gamble, vocalist with Northern Irish band Silent Running
