= Rudy Thompson =

United States Virgin Islands sailor

Personal information
- Full name: Rudolph B. Thompson
- Nationality: American Virgin Islander
- Born: May 13, 1929; Birmingham, Alabama, U.S.
- Died: April 24, 2010 (aged 80); Saint Thomas, U.S. Virgin Islands

Sailing career
- Class: Flying Dutchman
- Club: St. Thomas Yacht Club

Rudolph B. Thompson (May 13, 1929 – April 24, 2010) was a sailor who represented the United States Virgin Islands. He competed in the Flying Dutchman event at the 1968 Summer Olympics.
