= Radamés Torruella =

Puerto Rican sailor

Personal information
- Nationality: Puerto Rican
- Born: 28 September 1940; San Juan, Puerto Rico
- Died: 7 February 2016 (aged 75); San Juan, Puerto Rico

Sport
- Sport: Sailing

Radames Alfredo Torruella Del Valle (28 September 1940 – 7 February 2016) was a Puerto Rican sailor. He competed in the Flying Dutchman event at the 1968 Summer Olympics. Served in the United States Army in the Vietnam War. He later graduated in Business and Finance at the Wharton School of the University of Pennsylvania in 1966 and from the University of Puerto Rico School of Law in 1969.
