= Christian Maes =

Belgian sailor (1947–2021)

Personal information
- Nationality: Belgian
- Born: 2 October 1947; Ghent, Belgium
- Died: 21 March 2021 (aged 73)

Sport
- Sport: Sailing

Christian Maes (2 October 1947 – 21 March 2021) was a Belgian sailor. He competed in the Flying Dutchman event at the 1968 Summer Olympics.
