= Bob James (sailor) =

American sailor

Personal information
- Born: October 20, 1933 Mobjack, Virginia, United States
- Died: December 13, 2016 (aged 83) Hayes, Virginia, United States

Sport
- Sport: Sailing

Bob James (October 20, 1933 – December 13, 2016) was an American sailor. He competed in the Flying Dutchman event at the 1968 Summer Olympics.
