= Guillermo García (sailor) =

Mexican sailor (born 1944)

Personal information
- Born: 2 January 1944 (age 82) Guadalajara, Mexico

Sport
- Sport: Sailing

Guillermo García (born 2 January 1944) is a Mexican sailor. He competed in the Flying Dutchman event at the 1968 Summer Olympics.
