= Tan Tjong Sian =

Indonesian sailor

Personal information
- Nationality: Indonesian
- Born: 26 April 1931 (age 95) Yogyakarta, Dutch East Indies

Sport
- Sport: Sailing

Tan Tjong Sian (born 26 April 1931) is an Indonesian sailor. He competed in the Flying Dutchman event at the 1968 Summer Olympics.
