= Carlo Massone =

Italian sailor

Personal information
- Nationality: Italian
- Born: 16 November 1941 (age 84) Genoa, Italy

Sport
- Sport: Sailing

Carlo Massone (born 16 November 1941) is an Italian sailor. He competed in the Flying Dutchman event at the 1968 Summer Olympics.
