= Adriano da Silva (sailor) =

Portuguese sailor

Personal information
- Full name: Adriano Augusto da Silva
- Nationality: Portuguese
- Born: 15 October 1933 (age 91); Mazozo, Angola

Sport
- Sport: Sailing

Adriano Augusto da Silva (Note: This name uses Portuguese naming customs: the first or maternal family name is Augusto and the second or paternal family name is Silva.) (born 15 October 1933) is a Portuguese sailor. He competed in the Flying Dutchman event at the 1968 Summer Olympics.
