= Carl Ryves =

Australian sailor

Personal information
- Nationality: Australian
- Born: 14 July 1940
- Died: 13 October 2022 (aged 82)

Sport
- Sport: Sailing

Carl Ryves (14 July 1940 – 13 October 2022) was an Australian sailor. He competed in the Flying Dutchman event at the 1968 Summer Olympics.
