= William Plant (sailor) =

Jamaican sailor (1944–2018)

Personal information
- Born: 2 December 1944; Kingston, Colony of Jamaica, British Empire
- Died: 26 March 2018 (aged 73)

Sport
- Sport: Sailing

William Plant (2 December 1944 – 26 March 2018) was a Jamaican sailor. He competed in the Flying Dutchman event at the 1968 Summer Olympics.
