= James David =

James David may refer to:

- James Burty David (1946–2009), Mauritian politician
- Jim David (American football) (1927–2007), American football player
- Jim David, American stand-up comedian, actor and writer

== See also ==
- David James (disambiguation)
