= Lev Rvalov =

Soviet sailor (1941–2003)

Personal information
- Nationality: Soviet
- Born: 23 February 1941 Kimry, Russia
- Died: 19 June 2003 (aged 62) Moscow, Russia

Sport
- Sport: Sailing

Lev Rvalov (23 February 1941 – 19 June 2003) was a Soviet sailor. He competed in the Flying Dutchman event at the 1968 Summer Olympics. After his competitive career, he served as coach of the national team.
