= Joël Roland =

Belgian sailor (born 1944)

Personal information
- Nationality: Belgian
- Born: 24 September 1944 (age 82) Ixelles, Belgium

Sport
- Sport: Sailing

Joël Roland (born 24 September 1944) is a Belgian sailor. He competed in the Flying Dutchman event at the 1968 Summer Olympics.
