= Peter Kolni =

Swedish sailor

Personal information
- Nationality: Swedish
- Born: 27 June 1948 (age 76); Gothenburg, Sweden

Sport
- Sport: Sailing

Peter Kolni (born 27 June 1948) is a Swedish sailor. He competed at the 1968 Summer Olympics, the 1972 Summer Olympics, and the 1976 Summer Olympics.
