= David James (cricketer, born 1791) =

English cricketer

Personal information
- Born: 3 June 1791; Marylebone, London
- Died: 1 May 1846 (aged 54); Lincoln's Inn, London

David James (3 June 1791 – 1 May 1846) was an English cricketer who was active in the 1810s. James, who was born in Marylebone, is recorded in two matches for Old Etonians, totalling 11 runs with a highest score of 9. He held two catches and took 3 wickets including one return of 4 wickets in an innings. He died in Lincoln's Inn, London, aged 54.

== Bibliography ==
- Haygarth, Arthur (1862). Scores & Biographies, Volume 1 (1744–1826). Lillywhite.
