= David James (painter) =

British painter (1853–1904)

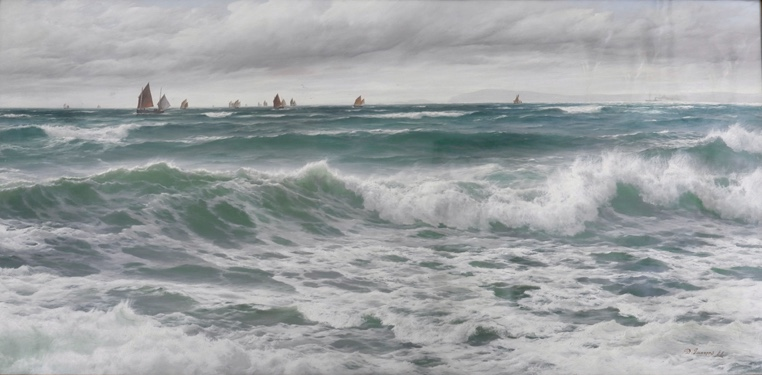
- Ebb Tide Fishing Boats Going Out, Devon 1888
- Born: 1853; Ireland
- Died: 1904 (aged 50–51)
- Known for: Marine painter
- Awards: Royal Academy of Arts

David James (1853–1904) was a British marine painter.

== Life and works ==
'David James' was a pseudonym, his real name being Joseph Donahue, the fourth child of a London porter and a probably Irish mother. He was born in Ireland in 1853 and moved to Dalston, Cumbria in his twenties, when he changed his name to David James. He had little education and for a while, eked out a meagre existence as a pavement artist in London until his talent attracted the attention of a German-born picture dealer, who supported his training and with whose family he lived for much of his life (ibid). When in Yorkshire, he began a fascination with seascapes, most especially with crashing waves, which became his signature.

James lived in Plymouth during the 1880s, where he began painting a series of realistic "sea-pieces" from the south-western and southern coasts of England from Cornwall to the Thames. The exact locality is rarely identified by any distinguishing landmarks. The man we know today from his paintings are all in oil, from his time in Cornwall and Devon, concentrating on the painting of coastal scenes and the sea itself. Today, he is best known for his large pictures of breaking waves.

James exhibited throughout London and at the Royal Academy in 1886 (living in Dalston), 1888 (having moved to Maida Vale), 1892 and 1897. Like Henry Moore (painter), James was more interested in pure studies of the sea, rather than topographical coastal views. He was especially good at painting waves.
