= Pál Gömöry =

Hungarian sailor (1936–2021)

Personal information
- Nationality: Hungarian
- Born: 23 April 1936 Budapest, Hungary
- Died: 7 May 2021 (aged 85)

Sport
- Sport: Sailing

Pál Gömöry (23 April 1936 – 7 May 2021) was a Hungarian sailor. He competed in the Flying Dutchman event at the 1968 Summer Olympics.
