= Peter Gamble (sailor) =

Hong Kong sailor

Personal information
- Nationality: Hong Konger
- Born: 13 August 1937 (age 89)

Sport
- Sport: Sailing

Peter Gamble (born 13 August 1937) is a Hong Kong sailor. He competed in the Flying Dutchman event at the 1968 Summer Olympics.
