= Lorenzo Villaseñor =

Mexican sailor (born 1947)

Personal information
- Born: 17 January 1947 (age 79) Mexico City, Mexico

Sport
- Sport: Sailing

Lorenzo Villaseñor (born 17 January 1947) is a Mexican sailor. He competed at the 1968 Summer Olympics and the 1972 Summer Olympics.
