= Farkas Litkey =

Hungarian sailor

Personal information
- Nationality: Hungarian
- Born: 5 February 1966 (age 59); Balmazújváros, Hungary

Sport
- Sport: Sailing

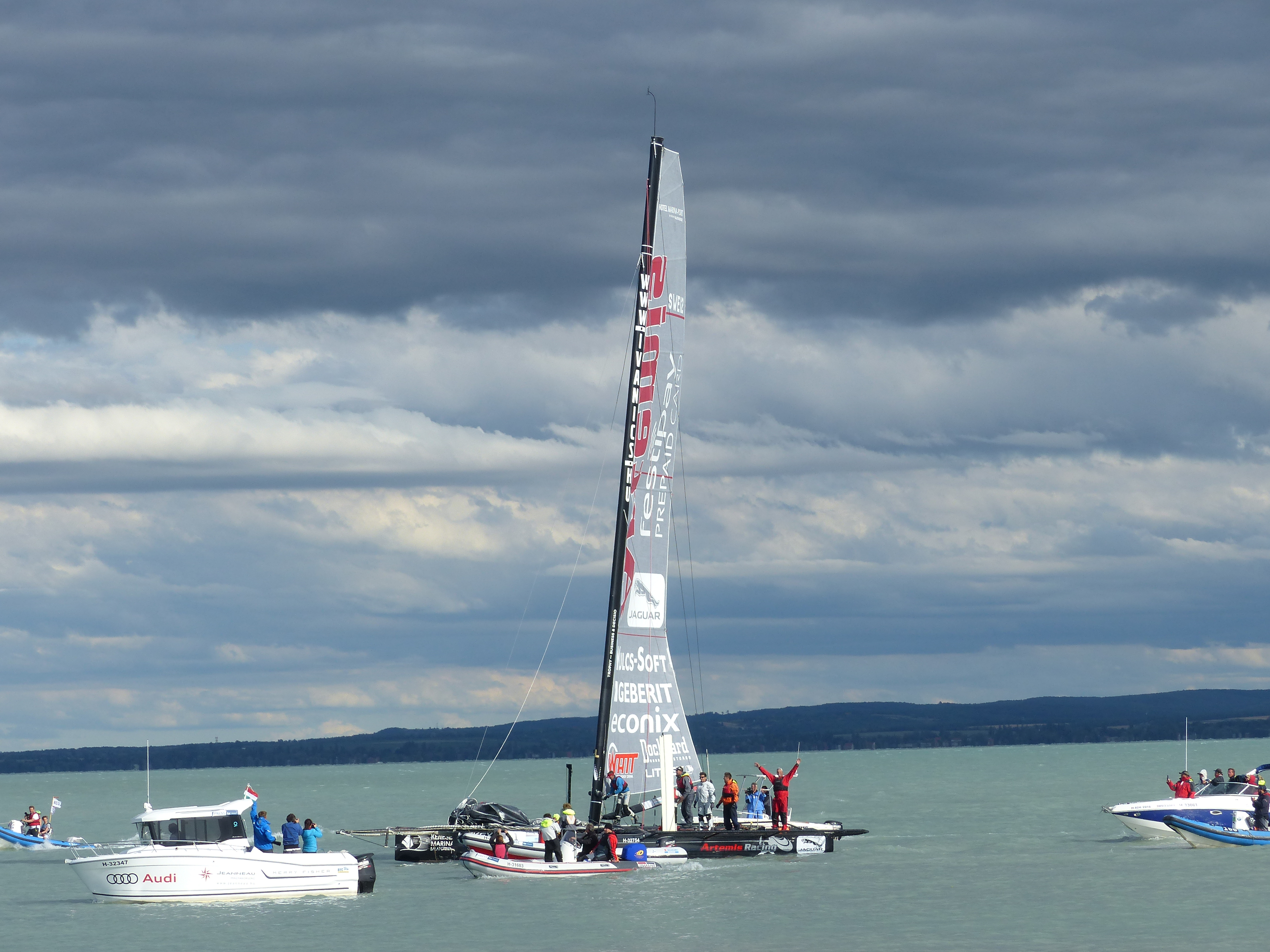
Litkey, winner of the 48. Kékszalag regatta. Litkey on the right side, in red jacket.

Farkas Litkey (born 5 March 1966) is a Hungarian former sailor. He competed in the Finn event at the 1996 Summer Olympics. He is a 13 time winner of the Blue Ribbon Regatta at Lake Balaton.
