= Dai James =

Welsh footballer

Personal information
- Full name: David James
- Date of birth: 16 November 1899
- Place of birth: Aberdare, Wales
- Height: 5 ft 7 in (1.70 m)
- Positions: Half back; forward

Senior career*
Years	Team	Apps	(Gls)
1921–1926	Aberdare Athletic	171	(16)
1926–1929	Brighton & Hove Albion	30	(8)
- * Club domestic league appearances and goals

David James (16 November 1899 – after 1929) was a Welsh professional footballer who made 201 appearances in the Football League playing as a half back or forward for Aberdare Athletic and Brighton & Hove Albion.

== Life and career ==
James was born in Aberdare in 1899. He joined his hometown club, Aberdare Athletic, ahead of their first season in the Football League, and went on to make 171 appearances in the Third Division South, playing at centre half, wing half, and all the forward positions in a five-and-a-half-year stay. He moved on to another third-tier club, Brighton & Hove Albion, in December 1926, and made a further 30 league appearances before being released at the end of the 1928–29 season.
