= David James (sailor) =

American sailor (born 1949)

Personal information
- Full name: David Nowell James
- Born: December 9, 1949 (age 76) Newport News, Virginia, U.S.

Sport
- Sport: Sailing

David Nowell James (born December 9, 1949) is an American sailor. He competed in the Flying Dutchman event at the 1968 Summer Olympics.
