= David James (philosopher) =

Professor at the University of Warwick (born 1966)

- Born: 1966 (age 59–60)

Academic background
- Education: University of Sussex (PhD)
- Thesis: Hegel's Theory of Subjectivity (2004)

Academic work
- Era: Contemporary philosophy
- Region: Western philosophy
- School or tradition: German Idealism
- Institutions: University of Warwick
- Website: warwick.ac.uk/fac/soc/philosophy/people/james/

David Neil James (born 1966) is professor of philosophy at the University of Warwick.

== Life and works ==
=== Selected publications ===
==== Monographs ====
- James, David (2023). Property and its Forms in Classical German Philosophy. Cambridge: Cambridge University Press. doi:10.1017/9781009288118. ISBN 978-1-009-28814-9.
- James, David (2021). Practical Necessity, Freedom, and History. Oxford University PressOxford. doi:10.1093/oso/9780198847885.001.0001. ISBN 0-19-884788-2.
- James, David (2015). Fichte's Republic: Idealism, History and Nationalism. Cambridge: Cambridge University Press. doi:10.1017/cbo9781316275719. ISBN 978-1-107-11118-9.
- James, David (2013). Rousseau and German Idealism: Freedom, Dependence and Necessity. Cambridge: Cambridge University Press. doi:10.1017/cbo9781139795388. ISBN 978-1-107-03785-4.
- James, David (2011). Fichte's Social and Political Philosophy: Property and Virtue. Modern European Philosophy. Cambridge: Cambridge University Press. doi:10.1017/cbo9780511736131. ISBN 978-1-107-00155-8.
- James, David (2011). Art, Myth and Society in Hegel's Aesthetics. A&C Black. ISBN 978-1-4411-6471-1.
- James, David (2007). Hegel's Philosophy of Right: Subjectivity and Ethical Life. A&C Black. ISBN 978-1-4411-4421-8.
- James, David (2007). Hegel: A Guide For The Perplexed. Continuum.

==== Editorials ====
- James, David, ed. (2017). Hegel's Elements of the Philosophy of Right: A Critical Guide. Cambridge Critical Guides. Cambridge: Cambridge University Press. doi:10.1017/9781139939560. ISBN 978-1-107-07792-8.
- James, David; Zöller, Günter, eds. (2016). The Cambridge Companion to Fichte. Cambridge Companions to Philosophy. Cambridge: Cambridge University Press. doi:10.1017/9781139027557. ISBN 978-0-521-47226-5.

==== Articles ====
- "Hegel and Marx on the Necessity of the Reign of Terror". Hegel Bulletin. 41 (2): 202–223. 2020. doi:10.1017/hgl.2017.28. ISSN 2051-5367.
