= David James (footballer, born 1942) =

Scottish footballer

Personal information
- Full name: David James
- Date of birth: 12 December 1942 (age 83)
- Place of birth: Cambuslang, Scotland
- Position: Outside right

Senior career*
Years	Team	Apps	(Gls)
1961–1962	Blantyre Victoria		
1962–1963	Brighton & Hove Albion	5	(0)
1963–19??	Cambridge United		
- * Club domestic league appearances and goals

David James (born 12 December 1942) is a Scottish former professional footballer who played as an outside right in the Football League for Brighton & Hove Albion. He also played for junior club Blantyre Victoria and for Cambridge United of the English Southern League.
