= David James (footballer, born 1917) =

Welsh footballer (1917–1981)

Personal information
- Full name: David James
- Date of birth: 19 September 1917
- Place of birth: Swansea, Wales
- Date of death: 12 December 1981 (aged 64)
- Place of death: Swansea, Wales
- Height: 5 ft 7 in (1.70 m)
- Position: Centre forward

Senior career*
Years	Team	Apps	(Gls)
????–1934	Midland Athletic		
1934–1935	Leeds United	0	(0)
1935–1937	Bradford City	5	(0)
1937–1938	Mossley	43	(42)
1938–1947	Chelsea	0	(0)
1947–1948	Swansea Town	12	(7)
1948–????	Haverfordwest County		

Managerial career
- Haverfordwest County
- * Club domestic league appearances and goals

David James (9 September 1917 – 12 December 1981) was a Welsh professional football player and coach who played as a centre forward. He was also known as Dai James.

== Career ==
Born in Swansea, James signed for Bradford City in May 1935 from Leeds United. During his time with Bradford City he made five appearances in the Football League. He left the club in July 1937 to play for Mossley. He transferred to Chelsea for £200 in April 1938.

He joined Swansea Town in May 1947, helping them win the 1947 London Combination Cup final. He scored on his Football League debut for the club at Bristol City four months later. He netted seven goals in 12 League games before joining Haverfordwest County in August 1948 where he became captain, then manager.

== Sources ==
- Frost, Terry (1988). Bradford City A Complete Record 1903-1988. Breedon Books Sport. ISBN 0-907969-38-0.
