= Miklós Tuss =

Hungarian sailor

Personal information
- Nationality: Hungarian
- Born: 5 September 1898 Kevermes, Hungary
- Died: 25 May 1978 (aged 79) Budapest, Hungary

Sailing career
- Sport: Sailing
- Club: KMYC, (HUN)
- Class: 6 Metre
Competition record
Sailing
Representing Hungary
Olympic Games
1928 Amsterdam	6 Metre
- Updated on 18 March 2015

Miklós Tuss (5 September 1898 – 25 May 1978) was a sailor from Hungary, who represented his country at the 1928 Summer Olympics in Amsterdam, Netherlands.

== Sources ==
- "Miklós Tuss Bio, Stats, and Results". Olympic Sports. Sports-Reference.com. Archived from the original on 18 April 2020.
