= Szabolcs Izsák =

Hungarian sailor

Personal information
- Nationality: Hungarian
- Born: 3 April 1944 Budapest, Hungary
- Died: 6 July 1993 (aged 49) Budapest, Hungary

Sport
- Sport: Sailing

Szabolcs Izsák (3 April 1944 – 6 July 1993) was a Hungarian sailor. He competed at the 1968 Summer Olympics and the 1972 Summer Olympics.
