= List of Flying Dutchman (dinghy) championships =

This is a list of Flying Dutchman sailboat championships.

== Olympic Games ==
| Rank | Nation | Gold | Silver | Bronze | Total |
|---|---|---|---|---|---|
| 1 | Great Britain (GBR) | 2 | 2 | 1 | 5 |
| 2 | Spain (ESP) | 2 | 0 | 0 | 2 |
| 3 | Germany (GER) | 1 | 1 | 2 | 4 |
| 4 | Denmark (DEN) | 1 | 1 | 1 | 3 |
| 4 | United States (USA) | 1 | 1 | 1 | 3 |
| 6 | Norway (NOR) | 1 | 1 | 0 | 2 |
| 7 | New Zealand (NZL) | 1 | 0 | 0 | 1 |
| 8 | Canada (CAN) | 0 | 1 | 1 | 2 |
| 9 | France (FRA) | 0 | 1 | 0 | 1 |
| 9 | Ireland (IRL) | 0 | 1 | 0 | 1 |
| 11 | Brazil (BRA) | 0 | 0 | 2 | 2 |
| 12 | Hungary (HUN) | 0 | 0 | 1 | 1 |
| Totals (12 entries) | | 9 | 9 | 9 | 27 |

| Year | Gold | Silver | Bronze |
|---|---|---|---|
| 1960 Rome | Norway; Peder Lunde Jr. Bjørn Bergvall | Denmark; Hans Fogh; Ole Erik Petersen | United Team of Germany; Rolf Mulka; Ingo von Bredow |
| 1964 Tokyo | New Zealand; Helmer Pedersen; Earle Wells | Great Britain; Keith Musto; Tony Morgan | United States; Harry Melges; William Bentsen |
| 1968 Mexico City | Great Britain; Rodney Pattisson; Iain MacDonald-Smith | West Germany; Ulli Libor; Peter Naumann | Brazil; Reinaldo Conrad; Burkhard Cordes |
| 1972 Munich | Great Britain; Rodney Pattisson; Christopher Davies | France; Yves Pajot; Marc Pajot | West Germany; Ulli Libor; Peter Naumann |
| 1976 Montreal | West Germany; Jörg Diesch; Eckart Diesch | Great Britain; Rodney Pattisson; Julian Brooke-Houghton | Brazil; Reinaldo Conrad; Peter Ficker |
| 1980 Moscow | Spain; Alejandro Abascal; Miguel Noguer | Ireland; David Wilkins; James Wilkinson | Hungary; Szabolcs Detre; Zsolt Detre |
| 1984 Los Angeles | United States; Jonathan McKee; William Carl Buchan | Canada; Terry McLaughlin; Evert Bastet | Great Britain; Jonathan Richards; Peter Allam |
| 1988 Seoul | Denmark; Jørgen Bojsen-Møller; Christian Grønborg | Norway; Ole Pollen; Erik Björkum | Canada; Frank McLaughlin; John Millen |
| 1992 Barcelona | Spain; Luis Doreste; Domingo Manrique | United States; Paul Foerster; Stephen Bourdow | Denmark; Jørgen Bojsen-Møller; Jens Bojsen-Møller |

== Asian Games ==
| Rank | Nation | Gold | Silver | Bronze | Total |
|---|---|---|---|---|---|
| 1 | Japan (JPN) | 1 | 0 | 0 | 1 |
| 2 | Thailand (THA) | 0 | 1 | 0 | 1 |
| 3 | Indonesia (INA) | 0 | 0 | 1 | 1 |
| Totals (3 entries) | | 1 | 1 | 1 | 3 |

| Event | Gold | Silver | Bronze |
|---|---|---|---|
| 1970 Bangkok | Japan (JPN); Akira Yamamura; Takashi Yamamura | Thailand (THA); Dawee Chullasapya; Suthep Indrakosoom | Indonesia (INA); John Gunawan; David Udjulawa |

== Pan American Games ==
| Rank | Nation | Gold | Silver | Bronze | Total |
|---|---|---|---|---|---|
| 1 | United States | 2 | 1 | 1 | 4 |
| 2 | Brazil | 2 | 1 | 0 | 3 |
| 3 | Canada | 0 | 2 | 2 | 4 |
| 4 | British West Indies | 0 | 0 | 1 | 1 |
| Totals (4 entries) | | 4 | 4 | 4 | 12 |

Source: Pan American Archived 25 June 2009 at the Wayback Machine

| Event | Gold | Silver | Bronze |
|---|---|---|---|
| 1959 Chicago | United States (USA); Harry Sindle; Robert Wood | Canada (CAN); Angus McDonald; Pierre Desjardins | British West Indies (BWI); Rawle Barrow; Barton Kirkconnell |
| 1963 São Paulo | Brazil (BRA); Joaquim Roderbourg; Klaus Hendriksen | United States (USA); Patricia Duane; John Duane | Canada (CAN); Anton Zegers; André Baby |
| 1967 Winnipeg | United States (USA); Buddy Melges; Bill Bentsen | Brazil (BRA); Reinaldo Conrad; Burkhard Cordes | Canada (CAN); Peter Byrne; Jeff Davies |
| 1975 Mexico City | Brazil (BRA); Reinaldo Conrad; Burkhard Cordes | Canada (CAN); Jamie Kidd; Hugh Kidd | United States (USA); Norman Freeman; John Mathias |

== World Championship ==
| Year | Gold | Silver | Bronze | Ref. |
|---|---|---|---|---|
| 1956 Starnberger See | West Germany; Rolf Mulka; Ingo von Bredow | East Germany; Walter Berger; Walter Hohensee | West Germany; Harald Kuehling; Hans Lorentz | |
| 1957 Rimini | West Germany; Rolf Mulka; Ingo von Bredow | Netherlands; Jaap Helder; Joop van Meggelen | West Germany; Jürgen Wagner; Hans Hauschildt | |
| 1958 Attersee | Australia; Rolly Tasker; Ian Palmer | Italy; Vittorio Porta; Emilio Massino | Netherlands; Norman Oerlemans; Bob Boeschoten | |
| 1959 Whitstable | Italy; Mario Capio; Tullio Pizzorno | Great Britain; Adrian Jardine; Angus Fryer | West Germany; Rolf Mulka; Ingo von Bredow | |
| 1962 St. Petersburg | Denmark; Hans Fogh; Paul Elvstrøm | Australia; Rolly Tasker; Andrew White | Great Britain; Stuart Jardine; James Ramus | |
| 1963 Starnberger See | Switzerland; Jean-Pierre Renevier; Serge Graz | Great Britain; Keith Musto; Tony Morgan | Italy; Mario Capio; Marco Sartori | |
| 1965 Alassio | Great Britain; Dick Pitcher; Ian McCormack | Italy; Mario Capio; Marco Sartori | East Germany; Hans-Jürgen Cochius; Werner Christoph | |
| 1967 Montréal | Great Britain; John Oakeley; David Hunt | New Zealand; Geoff Smale; Ralph Roberts | Austria; Karl Geiger; Werner Fischer | |
| 1969 Naples | Great Britain; Rodney Pattisson; Ian MacDonald-Smith | France; Alain Draeger; Pierre Nottet | Great Britain; Keith Musto; John Wigglesworth | |
| 1970 Adelaide | Great Britain; Rodney Pattisson; Ian MacDonald-Smith | Great Britain; John Truett; Edward Leask | Australia; Craig Whitworth; Bob Miller | |
| 1971 La Rochelle | Great Britain; Rodney Pattisson; Julian Brooke-Houghton | New Zealand; Jock Bilger; Murray Ross | Australia; Mark Bethwaite; Tim Alexander | |
| 1973 Rochester | Denmark; Hans Fogh; Evert Bastet | France; Marc Pajot; Yves Pajot | Brazil; Reinaldo Conrad; Burkhard Cordes | |
| 1974 Weymouth | East Germany; Ilja Wolf; Bernd Klenke | East Germany; Herbert Hüttner; Ulf Pagenkopf | Canada; Hans Fogh; Evert Bastet | |
| 1975 Abino Bay | France; Marc Pajot; Yves Pajot | New Zealand; Jock Bilger; Murray Ross | West Germany; Jörg Diesch; Eckart Diesch | |
| 1977 Nago-Torbole | Switzerland; Jörg Hotz; André Nicolet | West Germany; Jörg Diesch; Eckart Diesch | Netherlands; Erik Vollebregt; Sjoerd Vollebregt | |
| 1978 Hayling Island | West Germany; Albert Batzill; Rudolf Batzill | West Germany; Jörg Diesch; Eckart Diesch | Spain; Alejandro Abascal; Miguel Noguer | |
| 1979 Kiel | France; Marc Bouet; Thierry Poirey | Spain; Alejandro Abascal; Miguel Noguer | Netherlands; Erik Vollebregt; Sjoerd Vollebregt | |
| 1980 Malmö | Canada; Terry McLaughlin; Evert Bastet | West Germany; Albert Batzill; Rudolf Batzill | West Germany; Jörg Diesch; Eckart Diesch | |
| 1981 Palamós | West Germany; Albert Batzill; Rudolf Batzill | West Germany; Jörg Diesch; Eckart Diesch | Italy; Marco Savelli; Roberto Gazzei | |
| 1982 Geelong | West Germany; Anton Schwarz; Peter Fröschl | Sweden; Bengt Hagander; Magnus Kjell | Canada; Terry McLaughlin; Evert Bastet | |
| 1983 Cagliari | United States; Jonathan McKee; William Carl Buchan | West Germany; Jörg Diesch; Eckart Diesch | Soviet Union; Sergey Borodinov; Vladyslav Akimenko | |
| 1984 La Rochelle | West Germany; Albert Batzill; Klaus Wende | France; Marc Bouet; Bruno Gandolphe | France; Laurent Delage; Thierry Poirey | |
| 1985 Gargnano | Denmark; Jørgen Schönherr; Michael Poulsen | West Germany; Jörg Diesch; Eckart Diesch | Italy; Mario Celon; Claudio Celon | |
| 1986 Rio de Janeiro | West Germany; Jörg Diesch; Eckart Diesch | West Germany; Albert Batzill; Klaus Wende | Canada; Frank McLaughlin; John Millen | |
| 1987 Kiel | Spain; Luis Doreste; Andor Serra | Soviet Union; Sergey Borodinov; Viktor Budantsev | West Germany; Markus Wieser; Franz Wieser | |
| 1988 Medemblik | Denmark; Jørgen Bojsen-Møller; Christian Grønborg | New Zealand; Murray Jones; Greg Knowles | France; Thierry Berger; Vincent Berger | |
| 1989 Alassio | West Germany; Albert Batzill; Peter Lang | West Germany; Markus Wieser; Peter Fröschl | Norway; Ole Petter Pollen; Erik Bjørkum | |
| 1990 Newport | Denmark; Jørgen Bojsen Møller; Jens Bojsen-Møller | France; Thierry Berger; Vincent Berger | West Germany; Albert Batzill; Peter Lang | |
| 1991 Tauranga | United States; Paul Foerster; Stephen Bourdow | France; Thierry Berger; Vincent Berger | Denmark; Jørgen Bojsen Møller; Jens Bojsen-Møller | |
| 1992 Cádiz | United States; Paul Foerster; Stephen Bourdow | New Zealand; Murray Jones; Greg Knowles | France; Thierry Berger; Vincent Berger | |
| 1993 Travemünde | Denmark; Jørgen Bojsen Møller; Jens Bojsen-Møller | Austria; Stephan Schurich; Mark Dieckmann | Germany; Andreas Piettner; Max Friedrich | |
| 1994 Adelaide | Hungary; Szabolcs Majthényi; András Domokos | Australia; Ian McCrossin; James Cook | New Zealand; Paul Francis; Simon Mander | |
| 1995 Nago-Torbole | Australia; Ian McCrossin; James Cook | Germany; Eddy Eich; Ben Hagenmeyer | Netherlands; Wim Lageslag; Peter van Koppen | |
| 1996 Balatonfüred | Germany; Ulf Lehmann; Stefan Mädicke | Hungary; Szabolcs Majthényi; András Domokos | Germany; Uwe Steingroß; Sven Hermenau | |
| 1997 St. Petersburg | Australia; Ian McCrossin; James Cook | Italy; Roberto Cipriani; Stefano Morelli | Germany; Hans-Peter Schwarz; Roland Kirst | |
| 1998 Den Oever | Netherlands; Enno Kramer; Hein Dijksterhuis | Australia; Ian McCrossin; James Cook | Netherlands; Wim Langeslag; Jacob Bojsen-Møller | |
| 1999 Lee-on-the-Solent | Denmark; Jørgen Schonherr; Jacob Bojsen-Møller | Germany; Jörn Borowski; Andreas Berlin | Netherlands; Enno Kramer; Hein Dijksterhuis | |
| 2000 Durban | Australia; Ian McCrossin; James Cook | Germany; Hans-Peter Schwarz; Roland Kirst | Great Britain; John Best; James Cole | |
| 2001 Gilleleje | Denmark; Jørgen Bojsen-Møller; Jacob Bojsen-Møller | Hungary; Szabolcs Majthényi; András Domokos | Germany; Hans-Peter Schwarz; Roland Kirst | |
| 2002 Tavira | Hungary; Szabolcs Majthényi; András Domokos | Germany; Hans-Peter Schwarz; Roland Kirst | Italy; Roberto Cipriani; Stefano Morelli | |
| 2003 Sandringham | Hungary; Szabolcs Majthényi; András Domokos | Australia; Norman Rydge; Richard Scarr | Germany; Hans-Peter Schwarz; Peter van Koppen | |
| 2004 Warnemünde | Hungary; Szabolcs Majthényi; András Domokos | Denmark; Jørgen Bojsen-Møller; Jacob Bojsen-Møller | Germany; Jörn Borowski; Andreas Berlin | |
| 2005 Balatonföldvár | Denmark; Jørgen Bojsen-Møller; Jacob Bojsen-Møller | Hungary; Szabolcs Majthényi; András Domokos | Australia; Norman Rydge; Richard Scarr | |
| 2006 St. Petersburg | Hungary; Szabolcs Majthényi; András Domokos | Germany; Hans-Peter Schwarz; Roland Kirst | Italy; Roberto Cipriani; Stefano Morelli | |
| 2007 Los Alcázares | Denmark; Jørgen Bojsen-Møller; Jacob Bojsen-Møller | Spain; Carlos Beltri; Javier Cayuela | Germany; Dirk Bogumil; Michael Lisken | |
| 2008 Napier | Hungary; Szabolcs Majthényi; András Domokos | Australia; Ian McCrossin; James Cook | Australia; Norman Rydge; Richard Scarr | |
| 2009 Medemblik | Denmark; Jørgen Bojsen-Møller; Jacob Bojsen-Møller | Hungary; Szabolcs Majthényi; András Domokos | Netherlands; Bas van der Pol; Mark van der Pol | |
| 2010 Constanţa | Hungary; Szabolcs Majthényi; András Domokos | Netherlands; Enno Kramer; Ard Geelkerken | Italy; Nicola Vespasiani; Francesco Vespasiani | |
| 2011 Malcesine | Hungary; Szabolcs Majthényi; András Domokos | Denmark; Jørgen Bojsen-Møller; Jacob Bojsen-Møller | Netherlands; Enno Kramer; Ard Geelkerken | |
| 2012 Santa Cruz | Hungary; Szabolcs Majthényi; András Domokos | Netherlands; Enno Kramer; Ard Geelkerken | Germany; Kay-Uwe Lüdtke; Kai Schäfers | |
| 2013 Balatonföldvár | Netherlands; Enno Kramer; Ard Geelkerken | Hungary; Szabolcs Majthényi; András Domokos | Denmark; Jørgen Bojsen-Møller; Jacob Bojsen-Møller | |
| 2014 Largs | Hungary; Szabolcs Majthényi; András Domokos | Netherlands; Enno Kramer; Ard Geelkerken | Italy; Nicola Vespasiani; Francesco Vespasiani | |
| 2015 Sydney | Hungary; Szabolcs Majthényi; András Domokos | Netherlands; Enno Kramer; Ard Geelkerken | Germany; Kilian König; Johannes Brack | |
| 2016 Steinhude | Denmark; Jørgen Bojsen-Møller; Jacob Bojsen-Møller | Germany; Kay-Uwe Lüdtke; Kai Schäfers | Germany; Kilian König; Johannes Brack | |
| 2017 Scarlino | Hungary; Szabolcs Majthényi; András Domokos | Germany; Hans-Peter Schwarz; Roland Kirst | Denmark; Jørgen Bojsen-Møller; Jacob Bojsen-Møller | |
| 2018 Medemblik | Denmark; Jørgen Bojsen-Møller; Jacob Bojsen-Møller | Hungary; Szabolcs Majthényi; András Domokos | Italy; Nicola Vespasiani; Francesco Vespasiani | |
| 2019 Nelson | Hungary; Szabolcs Majthényi; András Domokos | Germany; Kay-Uwe Lüdtke; Kai Schäfers | Netherlands; Enno Kramer; Ard Geelkerken | |
| 2021 Altea | Hungary; Szabolcs Majthényi; András Domokos | Germany; Kay-Uwe Lüdtke; Kai Schäfers | Spain; Francisco Martinez Torregrosa; Jose Luis Ruiz | |
| 2022 Campione | Germany; Kay-Uwe Lüdtke; Kai Schäfers | Denmark; Jørgen Bojsen-Møller; Jacob Bojsen-Møller | Hungary; Szabolcs Majthényi; András Domokos | |
| 2023 Gdynia | Denmark; Jørgen Bojsen-Møller; Jacob Bojsen-Møller | Hungary; Szabolcs Majthényi; András Domokos | Germany; Kay-Uwe Lüdtke; Kai Schäfers | |

== European Championship ==
| Rank | Nation | Gold | Silver | Bronze | Total |
|---|---|---|---|---|---|
| 1 | Great Britain | 8 | 3 | 2 | 13 |
| 2 | Hungary | 8 | 1 | 1 | 10 |
| 3 | Denmark | 5 | 4 | 3 | 12 |
| 4 | Italy | 3 | 0 | 3 | 6 |
| 5 | West Germany | 2 | 5 | 5 | 12 |
| 6 | France | 2 | 1 | 4 | 7 |
| 7 | East Germany | 1 | 4 | 1 | 6 |
| 8 | Spain | 1 | 3 | 1 | 5 |
| 9 | Netherlands | 1 | 2 | 3 | 6 |
| 10 | Canada | 1 | 1 | 1 | 3 |
| 10 | Switzerland | 1 | 1 | 1 | 3 |
| 12 | Soviet Union | 1 | 0 | 0 | 1 |
| 13 | Germany | 0 | 6 | 3 | 9 |
| 14 | Norway | 0 | 2 | 0 | 2 |
| 15 | Austria | 0 | 1 | 2 | 3 |
| 16 | Australia | 0 | 0 | 2 | 2 |
| 17 | Japan | 0 | 0 | 1 | 1 |
| 17 | Poland | 0 | 0 | 1 | 1 |
| Totals (18 entries) | | 34 | 34 | 34 | 102 |

| Event | Gold | Silver | Bronze |
|---|---|---|---|
| 1954 Rimini | Italy; Paul Elvstrøm; Aage Birch | United Kingdom; Stuart Morris; Keith Shackleton | France; Roger Tiriau; Charles Tiriau |
| 1955 Muiden | Italy; Vittorio Porta; Beppe Barnao | Netherlands; Jaap Helder | Italy; Dante Zia; Annibale Pelaschier |
| 1957 Chiemsee | Switzerland; Pierre Siegenthaler; Michel Buzzi | West Germany; Rolf Mulka; Ingo von Bredow | Poland; Roman Szadziewski; Zbigniew Szpetulski |
| 1959 Juelsminde | West Germany; Detlef Kreidel; Joachim Möller | Austria; Harald Fereberger; Gottfried Praxmarer | United Kingdom; Adrian Jardine; Angus Fryer |
| 1960 Sandhamn | Denmark; Hans Fogh; Ole Gunnar Petersen | Switzerland; Pierre Siegenthaler; Michel Buzzi | United Kingdom; Slotty Dawes; James Ramus |
| 1961 Bandol | Netherlands; Bart Kraan; Henk Kraan | West Germany; Volker "Wumme" Dietrich; Peter Altenkamp | Denmark; Hans Fogh; Ole Gunnar Petersen |
| 1962 Muiden | United Kingdom; Johnson Wooderson; Christopher Davies | Norway; Peder Lunde Jr. Bjørn Bergvall | France; Jean-Michel Auclair; Alain-François Lehoerff |
| 1964 Whitstable | United Kingdom; Keith Musto; Tony Morgan | Denmark; Hans Fogh; Ole Gunnar Petersen | Austria; Karl Geiger; Werner Fischer |
| 1966 Horten | United Kingdom; John Oakeley; David Hunt | United Kingdom; Keith Musto; Tony Morgan | France; Alain Draeger; Philippe Gravier |
| 1967 Bandol | United Kingdom; John Oakeley; David Hunt | United Kingdom; Rodney Pattisson; Iain MacDonald-Smith | Austria; Karl Geiger; Werner Fischer |
| 1968 Balatonfüred | United Kingdom; Rodney Pattisson; Iain MacDonald-Smith | France; Bertrand Cheret; Bruno Troublé | Netherlands; Ben Verhagen; Nick de Jong |
| 1970 Arenys de Mar | United Kingdom; Rodney Pattisson; Nicholas Davies | East Germany; Herbert Hüttner; Dietmar Gedde | Italy; Carlo Massone; Fabio Risso |
| 1972 Medemblik | United Kingdom; Rodney Pattisson; Christopher Davies | West Germany; Ullrich Libor; Peter Naumann | Netherlands; Fred Imhoff; Simon Korver |
| 1973 Thun | East Germany; Herbert Hüttner; Ulf Pagenkopf | East Germany; Fröbe; Mayer | France; Marc Pajot; Yves Pajot |
| 1975 Travemünde | United Kingdom; Rodney Pattisson; Julian Brooke-Houghton | West Germany; Albert Batzill; Rudolf Batzill | Switzerland; Jörg Hotz; André Nicolet |
| 1976 Hyères | Canada; Hans Fogh; Evert Bastet | East Germany; Uwe Steingross; Jörg Schramme | West Germany; Jörg Diesch; Eckart Diesch |
| 1982 Silvaplana | Denmark; Jørgen Bojsen-Møller; Jacob Bojsen-Møller | West Germany; Jörg Diesch; Eckart Diesch | West Germany; Peter Wiesner; Thomas Dressendörfer |
| 1986 Rijeka | West Germany; Jörg Diesch; Eckart Diesch | Canada; Frank McLaughlin; John Millen | Japan; Saburo Sato; Tatsuya Wakinaga |
| 1987 Horten | France; Thierry Berger; Vincent Berger | Denmark; Jørgen Bojsen-Møller; Jacob Bojsen-Møller | Spain; Luis Doreste; Andor Serra |
| 1988 Palma de Mallorca | Spain; Luis Doreste; Miguel Noguer | Norway; Ole Petter Pollen; Erik Bjørkum | West Germany; Albert Batzill; Peter Lang |
| 1989 Balatonfüred | Hungary; Tamás Pomucz; Béla Argay | East Germany; Ulf Lehmann; Stefan Mädicke | East Germany; Jörn Borowski; Matthias Kroh |
| 1990 Laredo | Soviet Union; Georgy Shayduko; Viktor Budantsev | Spain; Luis Doreste; Domingo Manrique | West Germany; Andreas Willim; Carsten Kemmling |
| 1991 Abersoch | Italy; Luca Santella; Flavio Grassi | Spain; Luis Doreste; Domingo Manrique | West Germany; Albert Batzill; Peter Lang |
| 1992 Toulon | France; Thierry Berger; Vincent Berger | Spain; Luis Doreste; Domingo Manrique | Canada; Frank McLaughlin; John Millen |
| 1994 Neusiedl | Denmark; Jørgen Bojsen-Møller; Jacob Bojsen-Møller | Germany; Andreas Plettner; Mark Dickmann | Australia lan McCrossin; James Cook |
| 1997 Mar Menor | Hungary; Szabolcs Majthényi; András Domokos | Germany; Michael Dorrer; Josef Seebauer | Germany; Andreas Gillwald; Martin Romberg |
| 2000 Elba | Hungary; Szabolcs Majthényi; András Domokos | Germany; Hans-Peter Schwarz; Roland Kirst | Denmark; Jørgen Schønherr; Jørgen Bojsen-Møller |
| 2003 Dervio | Denmark; Jørgen Bojsen-Møller; Jacob Bojsen-Møller | Germany; Hans-Peter Schwarz; Roland Kirst | Hungary; Szabolcs Majthényi; András Domokos |
| 2006 Neusiedl | Hungary; Szabolcs Majthényi; András Domokos | Denmark; Jørgen Bojsen-Møller; Jacob Bojsen-Møller | Germany; Dirk Bogumil; Michael Lisken |
| 2008 Rabac | Denmark; Jørgen Bojsen-Møller; Jacob Bojsen-Møller | Hungary; Szabolcs Majthényi; András Domokos | Australia; Norman Rydge; Richard Scarr |
| 2012 Altea | Hungary; Szabolcs Majthényi; András Domokos | Denmark; Jørgen Bojsen-Møller; Jacob Bojsen-Møller | Netherlands; Enno Kramer; Ard Geelkerken |
| 2015 Umag | Hungary; Szabolcs Majthényi; András Domokos | Netherlands; Enno Kramer; Ard Geelkerken | Italy; Nicola Vespasiani; Francesco Vespasiani |
| 2019 Balatonföldvár | Hungary; Szabolcs Majthényi; András Domokos | Germany; Jörn Borowski; Bodo Borowski | Denmark; Jørgen Bojsen-Møller; Jens Bojsen-Møller |
| 2024 Cádiz | Hungary; Szabolcs Majthényi; András Domokos | Germany; Kay-Uwe Lüdtke; Kai Schäfers | Germany; Kilian König; Johannes Brack |

== Vintage Yachting Games ==
| Rank | Nation | Gold | Silver | Bronze | Total |
|---|---|---|---|---|---|
| 1 | Austria | 1 | 1 | 0 | 2 |
| 2 | Hungary | 1 | 0 | 0 | 1 |
| 3 | Germany | 0 | 1 | 1 | 2 |
| 4 | Spain | 0 | 0 | 1 | 1 |
| Totals (4 entries) | | 2 | 2 | 2 | 6 |

| Event | Gold | Silver | Bronze |
|---|---|---|---|
| 2008 (Netherlands); Medemblik | Hungary (HUN); Szabolcs Majthenyi; Andras Domokos | Germany (GER); Kilian Koenig; Johannes Brack | Germany (GER); Kai Schäfers; Markus Landgrebe |
| 2012 (Italy); Lake Como | Austria (AUT); Christoph Aichholzer; Philipp Zingerle | Austria (AUT); Silvia Aichholzer; Christoph Zingerle | Spain (ESP); Ginés Romero Bernabeu; Alvaro Moreno Egea |
| 2018 (Denmark); Copenhagen | not held in FD class | not held in FD class | not held in FD class |

== See also ==
- Flying Dutchman World Championship
- Sailing at the 1960 Summer Olympics – Flying Dutchman
- Sailing at the 1964 Summer Olympics – Flying Dutchman
- Sailing at the 1968 Summer Olympics – Flying Dutchman
- Sailing at the 1972 Summer Olympics – Flying Dutchman
- Sailing at the 1976 Summer Olympics – Flying Dutchman
- Sailing at the 1980 Summer Olympics – Flying Dutchman
- Sailing at the 1984 Summer Olympics – Flying Dutchman
- Sailing at the 1988 Summer Olympics – Flying Dutchman
- Sailing at the 1992 Summer Olympics – Flying Dutchman
