= Flying Dutchman World Championship =

The Flying Dutchman World Championship, also known as FD Worlds, are international sailing regattas in the Flying Dutchman class organized by the International Flying Dutchman Class Organization since 1956 and recognised by World Sailing.

The Szabolcs Majthényi & András Domokos team has been the most successful in the history of the championships, with fifteen titles, making Hungary the most successful among the nations. Danish sailors together have won thirteen championships as well, followed by sailors of West Germany with eight titles.

Flying Dutchman was an Olympic class from 1960 to 1992.

== History ==
The first Flying Dutchman World Championships were held in Starnberger See in 1956.

== Editions ==
Ed.			Hosts			Sailor			Boats				Ref.
No	Day/Month	Year	Host club	City	Country	No.	Nat.	Cont.	Boats			Mix	Ref.
1	19-25 Aug	1956		Lake Starnberg	West Germany								
2	18-25 Aug	1957		Rimini	Italy	174	10		87				
3	2-7 Sep	1958		Attersee	Austria	92	17		46				
4	20-25 Jul	1959	Whitstable Yacht Club	Whitstable	United Kingdom	30	15		15				
	-	1960	Not held due to the Summer Olympics										
	-	1961	NOT HELD										
5	3-10 Mar	1962		St Petersburg, Florida	United States	38	18		19				
6	30Sep -5Oct	1963		Tutzing	Germany	46	23		23				
	-	1964	Not held due to the Summer Olympics										
7	13-19 Sep	1965		Alassio	Italy	48	23		24				
	-	1966	NOT HELD										
8	-	1967		Montreal	Canada	44	21		22				
	-	1968	Not held due to the Summer Olympics										
9	6-13 Jul	1969		Naples	Italy	74	24		37				
10	20-26 Feb	1970		Adelaide	Australia	32	9		16				
11	26Jul -1Aug	1971		La Rochelle	France	60	24		30				
N/A	-	1972	Not held due to the Summer Olympics										
12	8-12 Sep	1973		Rochester	United States	52	12		26				
13	11-16 Jul	1974		Weymouth	United Kingdom	108	23		54				
14	5-10 Aug	1975		Buffalo	United States	62	17		31				
	-	1976	Not held due to the Summer Olympics										
15	6-15 Jun	1977		Nago-Torbole	Italy	86	21		43				
16	17-22 Sep	1978	Hayling Island Sailing Club	Hayling Island	United Kingdom	100	23		50				
17	23Jun -2Jul	1979		Kiel	Germany	108	25		54				
18	8-14 Jun	1980		Malmö	Sweden	92	24		46				
19	9-20 Oct	1981		Palamós	Spain	92	17		46				
20	2-10 Jan	1982		Geelong	Australia	86	13		43				
21	3-12 Jun	1983		Cagliari	Italy	120	25		60				
22	4-12 Apr	1984		La Rochelle	France	106	22		53				
23	1-12 Jul	1985		Gargnano	Italy	100	20		50				
24	12-23 Feb	1986		Rio de Janeiro	Brazil	112	15		56				
25	26Jun -4Jul	1987		Kiel	Germany	160	26		80				
26	1-9 Jul	1988		Medemblik	Netherlands	100	21		50				
27	16-23 Sep	1989		Alassio	Italy	102	20		51				
28	1-8 Sep	1990		Newport, Rhode Island	United States	144	17		72				
29	29Dec -8Jan	1991/92		Tauranga	New Zealand	132	19		66				
30	10-17 May	1992		Cádiz	Spain	134	25		67				
31	1-7 Aug	1993		Travemünde	Germany	140	10	3	70				
32	2-9 Jan	1994		Adelaide	Australia	72	7	4	36				
33	27Aug -3Sep	1995		Nago-Torbole	Italy								
34	1Jan -25May	1996		Balatonfüred	Hungary								
35	31Mar -5Apr	1997		St. Petersburg, Florida	United States								
36	25Jul -1Aug	1998		Den Oever	Netherlands	224	21	5	112				
37	23-31 Jul	1999	Lee on the Solent Sailing Club	Lee-on-the-Solent	United Kingdom				77				
38	13-24 Nov	2000		Durban	South Africa								
39	20Jun -28May	2001	Gilleleje Sejlklub	Gilleleje	Denmark	136	15	3	68				
40	28Aug -3Sep	2002		Tavira	Portugal	98	12	3	49				
41	27Dec -6Jan	2003/04	Sandringham Yacht Club	Sandringham, Victoria	Australia	110	12	3	55				
42	28Jul -4Aug	2004	Rostocker Yachtclub	Rostock, Warnemünde	Germany	186	12	3	93				
43	9-16 Sep	2005		Balatonföldvár	Hungary	166	15	3	83				
44	4-11 Apr	2006	St. Petersburg Yacht Club, Florida	St. Petersburg, Florida	United States	68	9	3	34				
45	13-16 Jul	2007		Mar Menor	Spain	144	15	3	72				
46	31Dec -11Jan	2008/09	Napier Sailing Club	Napier	New Zealand	88	11	3	44				
47	31Jul -7Aug	2009	Royal Yacht Club Hollandia	Medemblik	Netherlands								
48	27Jul -6Aug	2010	Yacht Club Bucuresti & Yacht Club Compass	Constanţa	Romania	44	9	2	22				
49	30Jun -9Jul	2011	Fraglia Vela Malcesine	Malcesine, Lake Garda	Italy	132	16	4	66				
50	25-30 Sep	2012	Santa Cruz Yacht Club	Santa Cruz, California	United States	92	11	4	46				
51	24May -1Jun	2013	Spartacus Sailing Club	Lake Balaton, Balatonföldvár	Hungary	170	18	4	86				
52	11-19 Jul	2014	Largs Sailing Club	Largs	United Kingdom	78	11	4	39				
53	1-8 Jan	2015	Royal Sydney Yacht Squadron	Kirribilli, Sydney	Australia	94	9	3	47				
54	20–29 May	2016		Steinhude	Germany	226	14	3	113				
55	25-30 Sep	2017	Club Nautico Scarlino	Puntone di Scarlino, Tuscany	Italy	204	15	2	102				
56	20-28 Jul	2018	Royal Yacht Club Hollandia	Medemblik	Netherlands								
57	13-21 Feb	2019	Nelson Yacht Club	Nelson/Marlborough	New Zealand	82	9	3	41				
N/A	Sep	2020	Club Nautico Altea	Altea, Valencian	Spain	Cancelled due to the COVID-19 pandemic							
58	4-11 Sep	2021	Club Nautico Altea	Altea, Valencian	Spain	68	6	1	34				
59	3-9 Sep	2022	Campione Univela	Lake Garda	Italy	136	12	3	68	59	0	9	
60	21-29 Jul	2023	Gdynia Sports and Recreation Center	Gdynia	Poland	116	9	2	58	51	0	8	
61	22Mar -1Apr	2024	St. Petersburg Yacht Club, Florida	St. Petersburg, Florida	United States	66	6	3	33	29	0	4	
62	4-12 Apr	2025	Club Nautico Puerto Sherry	Cádiz	Spain	120	8	1	60	50	0	10	
62	June	2026		Kiel	Germany	148	10	1	74				

== Multiple medallists ==
Source from the results table below updated to include up to 2024

Pos	Athlete	Gold	Silver	Bronze	Total	Entries	Ref.
1	Andras Domokos (HUN)	15	9	1	25	32	
1	Szabolcs Majthenyi (HUN)	15	9	1	25	31	
	Jorgen Bojsen-Moller (DEN)	10	3	1	14	20	
4	Jacob Bojsen-Moller (DEN)	9	3	2	13	18	
5	Albert Batzill (GER)	4	2	1	7	7	
6	Ian McCrossin (AUS)	3	3	0	6	17	
6	James Cook (AUS)	3	3	0	6	15	
8	Rodney Pattisson (GBR)	3	0	0	3	5	
9	Kai Schäfers (GER)	2	4	2	8	19	
9	Kay Uwe Lüdtke (GER)	2	4	2	8	19	
11	Rudi Batzill (GER)	2	1	0	3	3	
12	Evert Bastet (CAN)	2	0	2	4	7	
13	Rolf Mulka (EUA)	2	0	1	3	3	
13	Ingo Von Bredow (EUA)	2	0	1	3	3	
15	Iain Mcdonald Smith (GBR)	2	0	0	2	2	
15	Hans Fogh (DEN)	2	0	0	2	4	
15	Paul Foerster (USA)	2	0	0	2	2	
15	Stephen Bourdow (USA)	2	0	0	2	2	

== Medalists ==
Year	Gold	Silver	Bronze
1956 Starnberger See	West Germany; Rolf Mulka; Ingo von Bredow	East Germany; Walter Berger; Walter Hohensee	West Germany; Harald Kuehling; Hans Lorentz
1957 Rimini	West Germany; Rolf Mulka; Ingo von Bredow	Netherlands; Jaap Helder; Joop van Meggelen	West Germany; Jürgen Wagner; Hans Hauschildt
1958 Attersee am Attersee	Australia; Rolly Tasker; Ian Palmer	Italy; Vittorio Porta; Emilio Massino	Netherlands; Norman Oerlemans; Bob Boeschoten
1959 Whitstable	Italy; Mario Capio; Tullio Pizzorno	Great Britain; Adrian Jardine; Angus Fryer	West Germany; Rolf Mulka; Ingo von Bredow
1962 St. Petersburg	Denmark; Hans Fogh; Paul Elvstrøm	Australia; Rolly Tasker; Andrew White	Great Britain; Stuart Jardine; James Ramus
1963 Starnberger See	Switzerland; Jean-Pierre Renevier; Serge Graz	Great Britain; Keith Musto; Tony Morgan	Italy; Mario Capio; Marco Sartori
1965 Alassio	Great Britain; Dick Pitcher; Ian McCormack	Italy; Mario Capio; Marco Sartori	East Germany; Hans-Jürgen Cochius; Werner Christoph
1967 Montreal	Great Britain; John Oakeley; David Hunt	New Zealand; Geoff Smale; Ralph Roberts	Austria; Karl Geiger; Werner Fischer
1969 Naples	Great Britain; Rodney Pattisson; Ian MacDonald-Smith	France; Alain Draeger; Daniel Nottet	Great Britain; Keith Musto; John Wigglesworth
1970 Adelaide	Great Britain; Rodney Pattisson; Ian MacDonald-Smith	Great Britain; John Truett; Edward Leask	Australia; Craig Whitworth; Bob Miller
1971 La Rochelle	Great Britain; Rodney Pattisson; Julian Brooke-Houghton	New Zealand; Jock Bilger; Murray Ross	Australia; Mark Bethwaite; Tim Alexander
1973 Rochester	Denmark; Hans Fogh; Evert Bastet	France; Marc Pajot; Yves Pajot	Brazil; Reinaldo Conrad; Burkhard Cordes
1974 Weymouth	East Germany; Ilja Wolf; Bernd Klenke	East Germany; Herbert Hüttner; Ulf Pagenkopf	Canada; Hans Fogh; Evert Bastet
1975 Abino Bay	France; Marc Pajot; Yves Pajot	New Zealand; Jock Bilger; Murray Ross	West Germany; Jörg Diesch; Eckart Diesch
1977 Nago-Torbole	Switzerland; Jörg Hotz; André Nicolet	West Germany; Jörg Diesch; Eckart Diesch	Netherlands; Erik Vollebregt; Sjoerd Vollebregt
1978 Hayling Island	West Germany; Albert Batzill; Rudolf Batzill	West Germany; Jörg Diesch; Eckart Diesch	Spain; Alejandro Abascal; Miguel Noguer
1979 Kiel	France; Marc Bouet; Thierry Poirey	Spain; Alejandro Abascal; Miguel Noguer	Netherlands; Erik Vollebregt; Sjoerd Vollebregt
1980 Malmö	Canada; Terry McLaughlin; Evert Bastet	West Germany; Albert Batzill; Rudolf Batzill	West Germany; Jörg Diesch; Eckart Diesch
1981 Palamós	West Germany; Albert Batzill; Rudolf Batzill	West Germany; Jörg Diesch; Eckart Diesch	Italy; Marco Savelli; Roberto Gazzei
1982 Geelong	West Germany; Anton Schwarz; Peter Fröschl	Sweden; Bengt Hagander; Magnus Kjell	Canada; Terry McLaughlin; Evert Bastet
1983 Cagliari	United States; Jonathan McKee; William Carl Buchan	West Germany; Jörg Diesch; Eckart Diesch	Soviet Union; Sergey Borodinov; Vladyslav Akimenko
1984 La Rochelle	West Germany; Albert Batzill; Klaus Wende	France; Marc Bouet; Bruno Gandolphe	France; Laurent Delage; Thierry Poirey
1985 Gargnano	Denmark; Jørgen Schönherr; Michael Poulsen	West Germany; Jörg Diesch; Eckart Diesch	Italy; Mario Celon; Claudio Celon
1986 Rio de Janeiro	West Germany; Jörg Diesch; Eckart Diesch	West Germany; Albert Batzill; Klaus Wende	Canada; Frank McLaughlin; John Millen
1987 Kiel	Spain; Luis Doreste; Andor Serra	Soviet Union; Sergey Borodinov; Viktor Budantsev	West Germany; Markus Wieser; Franz Wieser
1988 Medemblik	Denmark; Jørgen Bojsen-Møller; Christian Grønborg	New Zealand; Murray Jones; Greg Knowles	France; Thierry Berger; Vincent Berger
1989 Alassio	West Germany; Albert Batzill; Peter Lang	West Germany; Markus Wieser; Peter Fröschl	Norway; Ole Petter Pollen; Erik Bjørkum
1990 Newport	Denmark; Jørgen Bojsen Møller; Jens Bojsen-Møller	France; Thierry Berger; Vincent Berger	West Germany; Albert Batzill; Peter Lang
1991 Tauranga	United States; Paul Foerster; Stephen Bourdow	France; Thierry Berger; Vincent Berger	Denmark; Jørgen Bojsen Møller; Jens Bojsen-Møller
1992 Cádiz	United States; Paul Foerster; Stephen Bourdow	New Zealand; Murray Jones; Greg Knowles	France; Thierry Berger; Vincent Berger
1993 Travemünde	Denmark; Jørgen Bojsen Møller; Jacob Bojsen-Møller	Austria; Stephan Schurich; Mark Dieckmann	Germany; Andreas Piettner; Max Friedrich
1994 Adelaide	Hungary; Szabolcs Majthényi; András Domokos	Australia; Ian McCrossin; James Cook	New Zealand; Paul Francis; Simon Mander
1995 Nago-Torbole	Australia; Ian McCrossin; James Cook	Germany; Eddy Eich; Ben Hagenmeyer	Netherlands; Wim Lageslag; Peter van Koppen
1996 Balatonfüred	Germany; Ulf Lehmann; Stefan Mädicke	Hungary; Szabolcs Majthényi; András Domokos	Germany; Uwe Steingroß; Sven Hermenau
1997 St. Petersburg	Australia; Ian McCrossin; James Cook	Italy; Roberto Cipriani; Stefano Morelli	Germany; Hans-Peter Schwarz; Roland Kirst
1998 Den Oever	Netherlands; Enno Kramer; Hein Dijksterhuis	Australia; Ian McCrossin; James Cook	Netherlands; Wim Langeslag; Jacob Bojsen-Møller
1999 Lee-on-the-Solent	Denmark; Jørgen Schonherr; Jacob Bojsen-Møller	Germany; Jörn Borowski; Andreas Berlin	Netherlands; Enno Kramer; Hein Dijksterhuis
2000 Durban	Australia; Ian McCrossin; James Cook	Germany; Hans-Peter Schwarz; Roland Kirst	Great Britain; John Best; James Cole
2001 Gilleleje	Denmark; Jørgen Bojsen-Møller; Jacob Bojsen-Møller	Hungary; Szabolcs Majthényi; András Domokos	Germany; Hans-Peter Schwarz; Roland Kirst
2002 Tavira	Hungary; Szabolcs Majthényi; András Domokos	Germany; Hans-Peter Schwarz; Roland Kirst	Italy; Roberto Cipriani; Stefano Morelli
2003 Sandringham	Hungary; Szabolcs Majthényi; András Domokos	Australia; Norman Rydge; Richard Scarr	Germany; Hans-Peter Schwarz; Peter van Koppen
2004 Warnemünde	Hungary; Szabolcs Majthényi; András Domokos	Denmark; Jørgen Bojsen-Møller; Jacob Bojsen-Møller	Germany; Jörn Borowski; Andreas Berlin
2005 Balatonföldvár	Denmark; Jørgen Bojsen-Møller; Jacob Bojsen-Møller	Hungary; Szabolcs Majthényi; András Domokos	Australia; Norman Rydge; Richard Scarr
2006 St. Petersburg	Hungary; Szabolcs Majthényi; András Domokos	Germany; Hans-Peter Schwarz; Roland Kirst	Italy; Roberto Cipriani; Stefano Morelli
2007 Los Alcázares	Denmark; Jørgen Bojsen-Møller; Jacob Bojsen-Møller	Spain; Carlos Beltri; Javier Cayuela	Germany; Dirk Bogumil; Michael Lisken
2008 Napier	Hungary; Szabolcs Majthényi; András Domokos	Australia; Ian McCrossin; James Cook	Australia; Norman Rydge; Richard Scarr
2009 Medemblik	Denmark; Jørgen Bojsen-Møller; Jacob Bojsen-Møller	Hungary; Szabolcs Majthényi; András Domokos	Netherlands; Bas van der Pol; Mark van der Pol
2010 Constanţa	Hungary; Szabolcs Majthényi; András Domokos	Netherlands; Enno Kramer; Ard Geelkerken	Italy; Nicola Vespasiani; Francesco Vespasiani
2011 Malcesine	Hungary; Szabolcs Majthényi; András Domokos	Denmark; Jørgen Bojsen-Møller; Jacob Bojsen-Møller	Netherlands; Enno Kramer; Ard Geelkerken
2012 Santa Cruz	Hungary; Szabolcs Majthényi; András Domokos	Netherlands; Enno Kramer; Ard Geelkerken	Germany; Kay-Uwe Lüdtke; Kai Schäfers
2013 Balatonföldvár	Netherlands; Enno Kramer; Ard Geelkerken	Hungary; Szabolcs Majthényi; András Domokos	Denmark; Jørgen Bojsen-Møller; Jacob Bojsen-Møller
2014 Largs	Hungary; Szabolcs Majthényi; András Domokos	Netherlands; Enno Kramer; Ard Geelkerken	Italy; Nicola Vespasiani; Francesco Vespasiani
2015 Sydney	Hungary; Szabolcs Majthényi; András Domokos	Netherlands; Enno Kramer; Ard Geelkerken	Germany; Kilian König; Johannes Brack
2016 Steinhude	Denmark; Jørgen Bojsen-Møller; Jacob Bojsen-Møller	Germany; Kay-Uwe Lüdtke; Kai Schäfers	Germany; Kilian König; Johannes Brack
2017 Scarlino	Hungary; Szabolcs Majthényi; András Domokos	Germany; Hans-Peter Schwarz; Roland Kirst	Denmark; Jørgen Bojsen-Møller; Jacob Bojsen-Møller
2018 Medemblik	Denmark; Jørgen Bojsen-Møller; Jacob Bojsen-Møller	Hungary; Szabolcs Majthényi; András Domokos	Italy; Nicola Vespasiani; Francesco Vespasiani
2019 Nelson	Hungary; Szabolcs Majthényi; András Domokos	Germany; Kay-Uwe Lüdtke; Kai Schäfers	Netherlands; Enno Kramer; Ard Geelkerken
2021 Altea	Hungary; Szabolcs Majthényi; András Domokos	Germany; Kay-Uwe Lüdtke; Kai Schäfers	Spain; Francisco Martinez Torregrosa; Jose Luis Ruiz
2022 Campione d’Italia	Germany; Kay-Uwe Lüdtke; Kai Schäfers	Denmark; Jørgen Bojsen-Møller; Jacob Bojsen-Møller	Hungary; Szabolcs Majthényi; András Domokos
2023 Gdynia	Denmark; Jørgen Bojsen-Møller; Jacob Bojsen-Møller	Hungary; Szabolcs Majthényi; András Domokos	Germany; Kay-Uwe Lüdtke; Kai Schäfers
2024 St. Petersburg	Germany; Kay-Uwe Lüdtke; Kai Schäfers	Hungary; Szabolcs Majthényi; András Domokos	Germany; Kilian König; Johannes Brack
2025 Cádiz	Germany; Kilian König; Johannes Brack	Hungary; Szabolcs Majthényi; András Domokos	Italy; Nicola Vespasiani; Francesco Vespasiani
2026 Kiel	Hungary; Szabolcs Majthényi; András Domokos	Germany; Kay-Uwe Lüdtke; Kai Schäfers	Italy; Nicola Vespasiani; Francesco Vespasiani

== See also ==
- World Sailing
- World championships in sailing
