= Norman Freeman =

American yacht racer (1931–2021)

Personal information
- Full name: Norman Douglas Freeman
- Nationality: American
- Born: November 14, 1931 Niagara Falls, New York,
- Died: 27 December 2021 (aged 90) Florida,
- Height: 5 ft 9 in (175 cm)
- Weight: 170 lb (77 kg)

Sailing career
- Sport: Sailing
- Club: Ithaca Yacht Club
- Class(es): Flying Dutchman, ILCA 7
Medal record
Sailing
Representing United States
Laser World Championships
Gold medal – first place	1974 Hamilton	Laser
Pan American Games
Bronze medal – third place	1975 Mexico City	Flying Dutchman

Norman Douglas Freeman (November 14, 1931 – December 27, 2021) was an American sailor, lawyer and convicted sex offender who competed in the 1976 Summer Olympics. He raced Flying Dutchman and finished in sixth place.

== Law career ==
Freeman was born in Niagara Falls, New York, the son of Cornell Law School professor Harrop Freeman. He attended Ithaca High School and Westtown School in West Chester, Pennsylvania before earning a Bachelor of Arts degree from Cornell University and graduating from Cornell Law School in 1956.

After graduation, Freeman practiced law in Niagara Falls from 1956 to 1957 and later became a law clerk for New York Supreme Court Justice Floyd E. Anderson in Binghamton, New York.

He opened his own law practice in Ithaca, New York, in April 1963. He was named Ithaca city attorney in December 1963, holding the position until 1967.

== Sailing career ==
Freeman began sailing as a freshman at Cornell in 1949, and also captained the men's swimming team. He won the Comet International Championship in 1961 and 1962. In 1963, Freeman won the final race in the North Flying Dutchman Championships, but lost the title to Buddy Melges. In 1964, he finished third in the Olympic trials in the Flying Dutchman class. He moved to the Finn class in 1968, but did not qualify.

He won multiple Eastern Finn championships from 1967 and Canadian Finn titles in the 1960s and 1970s.

In 1973 and 1975, Freeman won the Flying Dutchman national sailing championships. He then won a bronze medal at the 1975 Pan American Games in the Flying Dutchman class.

Freeman and his crew, John Mathias, qualified for the 1976 Summer Olympics after winning their final three qualifying races. Freeman and Mathias finished sixth.

At the 1996 Summer Olympics, Freeman was among former Olympians to carry the Olympic torch through Martin County, Florida.

== Legal troubles and death ==
Freeman was accused of forcing a 36-year-old woman to have sex with him at his Ithaca home on January 19, 1987. On October 5, he was sentenced to three years conditional discharge after pleading guilty to first-degree attempted sexual abuse, and surrendered his license to practice law as part of a plea bargain.

On July 26, 2005, Freeman was arrested on charges of sexual battery of a child and lewd and lascivious molestation of a child after a 6-year-old girl accused Freeman of fondling her at his home in Stuart, Florida, and the girl's 12-year-old sister accused him of assaulting her two years prior. Freeman was sentenced to 6.5 years in prison in November after pleading no contest to one of the charges. He was ordered to serve 23 years of sex offender probation after his release.

Freeman died on December 27, 2021, at his home in Florida.
