= Diesch =

Diesch is a German surname. Notable people with the surname include:

- Eckart Diesch (born 1954), German sailor
- Jörg Diesch (born 1951), German sailor
- Kellen Diesch (born 2000), American football player
- Otto Diesch (born 1896, date of death unknown), Argentine sprinter
