= 6 Metre World Cup =

International sailing regatta

The 6 Metre World Cup also known as 6 Metre World Championship is a biennial international sailing regattas in the 6 Metre class organized by the host club on behalf of the International Six Metre Association and recognized by World Sailing.

The principal trophy is the Six Metre World Cup. Swedish sailor Pelle Petterson has won most titles, with three titles between 1977 and 1983. Swiss sailor Bernard Haissly and Swedish Carl-Gustaf Piehl, have two each.

The most championships has been won by Swedish sailors, on eight occasions, followed by Swiss sailors, three titles, and sailors of Canada and the United States (two each).

The International 6 Metre was an Olympic class from 1908 to 1952.

== History ==
The first 6 Metre World Cup were held in Seattle in 1973.

== Editions ==
Ed.			Host / Location			Fleet	Boats	Sailors			Ref.
Ed.	Day/Month	Year	Host club	City	Country	Fleet	Boats	Comp.	Nat.	Cont.	Ref.
1	9-16 Sept.	1973		Seattle	United States	Open					
2		1975		Sandhamn	Sweden	Open					
3		1977		Marstrand	Sweden	Open					
4	4-12 Sept.	1979	Corinthian Yacht Club of Seattle; Seattle Yacht Club	Seattle	United States						
5	21–30 August	1981		Romanshorn	Switzerland						
6		1983	Newport Harbor Yacht Club	Newport Beach, California	United States						
7	10–21 April	1985		Cannes	France						
8	28Sep -6Oct	1987	Seawanhaka Corinthian Yacht Club	Centre Island, Oyster Bay, New York	United States	Open					
9		1989		Marstrand	Sweden	Open					
10		1991		Torquay	United Kingdom	Open					
11		1993		Cannes	France	Open					
12		1995			Sweden	Open					
13	1–8 May	1997		Cannes	France	Open					
14	11–18 July	1999		Hanko	Finland	Open					
15	14–21 June	2003		Saint-Tropez	France	Open					
16	26-30 Jul	2005	Royal Swedish Yacht Club	Saltsjöbaden, Stockholm	Sweden	Modern					
16	26-30 Jul	2005	Royal Swedish Yacht Club	Saltsjöbaden, Stockholm	Sweden	Classics					
17	16-23 Jul	2007	Royal Yacht Squadron	Cowes, Isle of Wight	United Kingdom	Modern	23				
17	16-23 Jul	2007	Royal Yacht Squadron	Cowes, Isle of Wight	United Kingdom	Classics	25				
18	8-12 Sep	2009	Sail Newport	Newport	United States	Modern	9				
18	8-12 Sep	2009	Sail Newport	Newport	United States	Classics	24				
19	5-12 Aug	2011		Helsinki	Finland	Modern	9				
19	5-12 Aug	2011		Helsinki	Finland	Classics	45				
20	1-8 Aug	2013	Flensburger Segel Club	Glücksburg	Germany	Modern	11				
20	1-8 Aug	2013	Flensburger Segel Club	Glücksburg	Germany	Classics	23				
21	17-21 Sep	2015	Societe Nautique de La Trinite-sur-Mer	La Trinité-sur-Mer, Morbihan, Brittany	France	Modern	19				
21	17-21 Sep	2015	Societe Nautique de La Trinite-sur-Mer	La Trinité-sur-Mer, Morbihan, Brittany	France	Classics	23				
22	15-21 Sep	2017	Royal Vancouver Yacht Club	Vancouver, British Columbia	Canada	Modern	24				
22	15-21 Sep	2017	Royal Vancouver Yacht Club	Vancouver, British Columbia	Canada	Classics	21				
23	5-9 Aug	2019	Hango Segelforening		Sweden	Modern	15				
23	5-9 Aug	2019	Hango Segelforening		Sweden	Classics	32				
24	13-18 Jun	2022	Real Club Nautico de Sanxenxo	Sanxenxo, Galicia	Spain	Modern	22				
24	13-18 Jun	2022	Real Club Nautico de Sanxenxo	Sanxenxo, Galicia	Spain	Classics	18				
25	31 Aug -8 Sep	2023	Royal Yacht Squadron	Cowes, Isle of Wight	United Kingdom	Modern	18				
25	31 Aug -8 Sep	2023	Royal Yacht Squadron	Cowes, Isle of Wight	United Kingdom	Classics	15				
26	17-27 Sept.	2025	Seawanhaka Corinthian Yacht Club	Centre Island, Oyster Bay, New York	United States	Modern	17				
26	17-27 Sept.	2025	Seawanhaka Corinthian Yacht Club	Centre Island, Oyster Bay, New York	United States	Classics	12				
27	-	2027	Nylandska Jaktklubben	Helsinki, Uusimaa	Finland	Modern					
27	-	2027	Nylandska Jaktklubben	Helsinki, Uusimaa	Finland	Classics					

== Medalists ==
Year	Gold	Silver	Bronze	Ref.
1973; Seattle USA; 20 Boats	US100 - St Francis V Tom Blackaller (USA)	KA8 - Pacemaker; David Forbes (AUS)	US87 - May Be VII; Sunny Vynne (USA)	
1975; Sandhamn; 35 Boats	S75 - May Be X Patric Fredell (SWE)	KA7 - Toogooloowoo V	US101 - Poisson Soluble	
1977; Marstrand; 19 Boats	S91 - Irene; Pelle Pettersson (SWE)	S88 - May Be XI; Patric Fredell (SWE)	US111 - Razzle Dazzle; Scott Rohrer (USA)	
1979; Seattle; 25 Boats	S97 - Irene; Pelle Pettersson (SWE)	US100 - St Francis V Tom Blackaller (USA)	US115 - Warhorse; Brian Wertheimer (USA)	
1981; Lake Constance; Boats	no wind			
1983; Newport Harbor; 15 Boats	S104/US117 - Irene/California I Pelle Pettersson (SWE)	US116 - Chinook; Carl Buchan (USA)	US118 - St Francis VIII; Paul Cayard (USA)	
1985; Cannes FRA; 39 Boats	Z77 - Junior; Philippe Dürr (SUI)	US120 - St Francis IX; Tom Blackaller (USA)	N85 - Filippa; Thomas Lundqvist (SWE)	
1987; Oyster Bay; 23 Boats	K86 - Scoundrel; Bruce Owen (GBR)	S114 - Notorious; Jörgen Sundelin (SWE)	S112 - J Cool; Peter Norlin (SWE)	
1989; Marstrand SWE; 37 Boats	US120 - St Francis IX US120; John Kostecki (USA)	S125 - Kratos; Pettersson	S118 - Sexa Nova; Johansson	
1991 Torquay	SWE; Leif Carlsson			
1993; Cannes FRA; 24 Boats	ITA 74 - Nivola Flavio Favini (ITA); Toni Bassani (ITA)	SWE 115 - May Be XIV; Patric Fredell (SWE)	Woodoo SWE122 Leif Carlsson (SWE); Erntemark Carlsson (SWE)	
1995; Sandhamn; 25 Boats	S 114 - NOTORIOUS; Carl-Gustav Piehl (SWE)	S 116 - INDISPENSABLE; Jacob Wallenberg (SWE)	S 123 - STING; Thomas Lundqvist (SWE)	
1997; Cannes; 22 Boats	GBR - Scoundrel Bruce Owen (GBR); Jonathan Howe (GBR); Rob Lipsett (GBR); Jonny Smallridge (GBR); Guy Barron (GBR)	SWE - Sophie Too Mats Johansson (SWE)	SWE - May Be XIV Patric Fredell (SWE)	
1999 Modern; Hanko; 13 Boats	SUI 77 - Fleau Bernard Haissly (SUI); Nicolas Berthoud (SUI); Christophe Megavand (SUI); Jean Michel Pachoud (SUI); Gerald Bechard	SWE / FIN 115 - May Be XIV Tom Jungell (FIN); Henrik Lundberg (FIN); Jari Bremer (FIN); Mikael Blom; Abe Kaakinen	GER 104 - Courage VII Dietrich Grünau (GER); Albert Batzill; Eddy Eich; Hannes Brochier; Albert Diesch	
1999 Classic; Hanko; 32 Boats	FIN 50 - Alibaba II Henrik TENSTRÖM (FIN); Nappe MOLANDER (FIN); John BLÄSSAR (FIN); Timo LAURILA (FIN); Kristian RÄME (FIN)	FIN 38 - Mariana Antero KAIRAMO (FIN); Rabbe KIHLMAN (FIN); Eero KAIRAMO (FIN); Jaakko KAIRAMO (FIN)	FIN 44 - Toy Eero LEHTINEN (FIN); Magnus BÄCKSTRÖM (FIN); Kenneth PERÄNEN (FIN); Jari JÄRVI (FIN); Jarmo HALONEN (FIN)	
2003 Modern; St.-Tropez FRA; 20 Boats	SWE114 - NOTORIOUS; Carl-Gustav Piehl (SWE)	GER104 - COURAGE VII; Dietrich Grünau (GER); Albert Batzill (GER)	SWE125 - DELPHINA; John Michael Larsson (SWE)	
2003 Classic; St.-Tropez FRA; 14 Boats	FIN44 - TOY Eero LEHTINEN (FIN); Kenneth PERÄNEN (FIN)	FRA111 - DIX AOUT Bernard Divorne (FRA); Pierre-Paul Heckly (FRA)	GBR48 - CAPRICE Tim Street (GBR); Richard Bond (GBR)	
2005 Modern; Sandhamn; 24 Boats	GER - Courage IX; Dietrich Grünau; Albert Batzill; Eddy Eich	GBR - Battlecry; Ben Clothier	SUI - Fleau; Bernard Haissly	
2005 Classic; Sandhamn; 27 Boats	DEN 64 - Sun Ray (1939/2005) Hans J. Oen (USA); Jørgen Jensen (DEN); Frank Stolpe (FIN); Joakim Rechnitzer (DEN); Troels Bækholm (DEN)	FIN 44 - TOY (1938) Eero LEHTINEN (FIN)	FIN 12 - FRIDOLIN (1930) Timo Koljonen (FIN)	
2007 Modern; Cowes; 23 Boats	Fleau - SUI; Bernard Haissly	Battlecry - GBR; Ben Clothier; John Prentice	Courage IX - GER; Dietrich Grünau	
2007 classic Cowes; 25 Boats	SWE 6 - Fagel Bla (1937) Fredrich Dahlman (SWE)	DEN 64 - Sun Ray (1939/2005) Erik Tingleff Larsen (DEN); Hans J. Oen (USA)	GBR 48 - Caprice (1946) Paul Smith (GBR)	
2009 Modern; Newport USA; 9 Boats	Sophie II; Hugo Stenbeck (SWE)	Scoundrel; Rob Gray (GBR)	Arunga; Bob Cadranell (USA)	
2009 Classic; Newport USA; 24 Boats	KC10 - Gallant Eric Jespersen (CAN)	FIN12 - Fridolin Johan Garkman (FIN); Peter Arstrand (FIN)	DEN65 - Great Dane Erik Tingleff Larsen (DEN)	
2011 Modern; Helsinki; 9 Boats	FRA 177 - Junior Yann Marilley (FRA)	SWE 115 - May Be XIV Patric Fredell (SWE)	SWE 132 - Sophie II Hugo Stenbeck (SWE)	
2011 Classic; Helsinki; 45 Boats	FIN 49 - Sara af Hangö; Henrik Tenström (FIN)	KC 10 - Gallant; Eric Jespersen (CAN)	US 83 - Llanoria; Erik BentzanENTZEN (USA)en	
2013 Modern; Flensburg; 11 Boats	CAN 135 - St. Francis IX Ross MacDonald (CAN); Andrew Costa (CAN); Steve Kinsey (CAN); Timothy Vogel (CAN); Tony Griffin (CAN)	GBR 107 - Valhalla Robert Smith; John Pollard; Nick Pearson; Paul Smith; Stephen Procter	GER 118 - Courage IX Albert Batzill; Dietrich Grünau; Albert Diensch; Eddy Eich; Hannes Brochier	
2013 Classics; Flensburg; 23 Boats	FIN 12; Henrik Lundberg (FIN) Johan Garkman (FIN); Peter Arstrand (FIN); Peter Tevstroem (FIN); Tom Boremus (FIN)	NOR 71; Lars Guck (NOR)	USA 83; Eric Jespersen (USA)	
2015 Modern; La Trinité-sur-Mer; 19 Boats	FRA 177 - Junior No Limit Yacht Yann Marilley (FRA); Nicolas Berthoud (SUI); Kaspar Schadegg (SUI); Philippe Dürr (SUI); Alexandre Nicole (FRA)	SUI 132 - Sophie; Hugo Stenbeck (USA)	CAN 111 - Blade; Steve Kinsey	
2015 Classics; La Trinité-sur-Mer; 23 Boats	US 83 - LLANORIA; Eric Jespersen (CAN); Herb Cole (USA); Pete Watkins (USA); Kris Bundy (USA); Peter Hoffman (USA); Matthew Henley (CAN)	K 22 - TITIA; Andy Postle (GBR)	KC 10 - GALLANT; Ben Mumford (CAN)	
2017 Classics; Vancouver, Canada; 21 Boats	E16 - BRIBÓN GALLANT; HM Don Juan Carlos de Borbón (ESP)	US81 - GOOSE; Peter P. Hofmann (USA)	KC19 - SASKIA; Lars Grael (BRA)	
2017 Vancouver	SUI 77 - Junior; Philippe Durr (SUI)	CAN 129 - New Sweden; Ben Mumford (CAN)	K 12 - St. Francis IX; Andy Beadsworth (GBR)	
2019 Modern; Hanko FIN; Boats	SUI 77 - Junior Philippe Durr (SUI); Nicolas Berthoud; Kaspar Schadegg; Yann Marillet; Alexandre Nicole			
2019 Classics; Hanko FIN; 16 Boats	E 16; King of Spain Juan Carlos (ESP) Inaqui Castaner (ESP); Alberto Viejo (ESP); Roi Alvarez (ESP); Ross MacDonald (CAN)			
2022 Modern; Sanxenxo ESP; 22 Boats	SUI 142 - MOMO Dieter Schoen (SUI); Markus Wieser (GER); Dirk de Ridder (NED); Ross Halcrow (NZL); Victor Manuel Mariño Prieto	JUNIOR SUI 77	SELJM POR 4	
2022 Classics; Sanxenxo ESP; 18 Boats	FRA 111 - DIX AOÛT Louis Heckly (FRA); Loïc Le Garrec (FRA); Bill Hugues Leclerc (FRA); Frédéric Baratay (FRA); Jonas Lambelet (FRA); Bernard Divorne (FRA)	ESP 16 - BRIBON 500	ESP 59 - AIDA	
2023	USA 126 - Scoundrel 2 Jamie Hilton (USA); Dave Hughes (USA); Mike Marshall (USA); Allan Terhune, Jr. (USA); Addison Caproni (USA)	GBR 112 - STELLA; Violeta Alvarez	SUI 142 - MOMO; Dieter Schoen	
2023 - Classics	ESP 16 - BRIBON His Majesty King Juan Carlos of Spain (ESP); Ross McDonald (NZL); Alejandro Abascal (ESP); Simon Fisher (GBR); Aleberto Viejo (ESP); Roi Alvarex (ESP)	FRA 111 - DIX AOÛT	GBR 31 - SILVERVINGEN	
2025 Modern	IVB 145 - MOMO II; Dieter Schoen (SUI); Alvaro Manuel Silveira Marinho (POR); Markus Wieser (GER); Eberhard Magg (GER); Mattias Benedikt Paschen-Schauenburg (GER)	SUI 144 - Eau Vive; Jamie Hilton (USA); Tim Healy (USA); Mike Marshall (USA); Addison Caproni (USA); Dave Hughes (USA)	SUI 100 - Duclop; Eric Monnin (SUI); Ute Monnin-Wagner (SUI); Franck Narbonne (FRA); Geoffrey Jan (SUI); Cédric Galetto (SUI)	
2025 Classic	ESP 16 - BRIBON; Alejandro Abascal (ESP); Pedro Campos (ESP); Eduardo Marin (ESP); Alberto Puga (ESP)	ESP 72 - TITIA; Mauricio Sanchez-Bella (ESP); Gerardo Prego (ESP); Jose Lis (ESP); Alicia Freire (ESP); Francisco Gonzalez (ESP); Juan Deben (USA)	US 43 - Sprig; Greg Stewart (USA); Jon Easley (USA); Paula Schmid (USA); Kole Kammner (USA); Calvin Schmid (USA); Chris Busch (USA)	

== See also ==
- World Sailing
