= Robert Wood (sailor) =

American sailor

Personal information
- Full name: Robert Morford Wood
- Nationality: American
- Born: April 9, 1926 Long Branch, New Jersey, U.S.
- Died: January 25, 2004 (aged 77) Melbourne, Florida, U.S.
- Height: 186 cm (6 ft 1 in)
- Weight: 83 kg (183 lb)

Sailing career
- Sport: Sailing
- Club: Monmouth Boat Club
- Class: Flying Dutchman
Medal record
Sailing
Representing United States
Pan American Games
Gold medal – first place	1959 Chicago	Flying Dutchman

Robert Morford Wood (April 9, 1926 – January 25, 2004) was an American sailor. He competed in the Flying Dutchman event at the 1960 Summer Olympics. He attended Rutgers University.
