= Joaquim Roderbourg =

Brazilian sailor

Personal information
- Nationality: Brazilian
- Born: 8 April 1918 Düsseldorf, Germany
- Died: 17 July 1991 (aged 73) Salzburg, Austria

Sailing career
- Sport: Sailing
- Class(es): Finn, Flying Dutchman
Medal record
Sailing
Representing Brazil
Pan American Games
Gold medal – first place	1963 São Paulo	Flying Dutchman

Joaquim Roderbourg (8 April 1918 – 17 July 1991) was a Brazilian sailor. He competed at the 1956 Summer Olympics and the 1964 Summer Olympics.
