= Barton Kirkconnell =

Jamaican sailor

Personal information
- Full name: Barton Gerald Kirkconnell
- Nationality: Jamaican
- Born: 6 May 1917 Cayman Brac, Cayman Islands
- Died: 31 August 2007 (aged 90) England
- Height: 183 cm (6 ft 0 in)
- Weight: 79 kg (174 lb)

Sailing career
- Sport: Sailing
- Class(es): Dragon, Flying Dutchman
Medal record
Sailing
Representing British West Indies
Pan American Games
Bronze medal – third place	1959 Chicago	Flying Dutchman

Barton Gerald Kirkconnell (6 May 1917 – 31 August 2007) was a Jamaican sailor. He competed at the 1964 Summer Olympics and the 1968 Summer Olympics.
