= Pierre Desjardins (sailor) =

Canadian sailor

Personal information
- Born: 9 July 1935 (age 91) Montreal, Quebec, Canada
- Height: 181 cm (5 ft 11 in)
- Weight: 72 kg (159 lb)

Sailing career
- Sport: Sailing
- Club: Royal St. Lawrence YC
- Class: Flying Dutchman
Medal record
Sailing
Representing Canada
Pan American Games
Silver medal – second place	1959 Chicago	Flying Dutchman

Pierre Desjardins (born 9 July 1935) is a Canadian sailor. He competed in the Flying Dutchman event at the 1960 Summer Olympics.
