= Peter Byrne (sailor) =

Canadian sailor

Personal information
- Full name: Peter Michael Byrne
- Nationality: Canadian
- Born: 5 March 1936 Dún Laoghaire, Ireland
- Died: 17 August 2017 (aged 81)
- Height: 180 cm (5 ft 11 in)
- Weight: 75 kg (165 lb)

Sailing career
- Sport: Sailing
- Club: Royal Vancouver Yacht Club
- Class: Flying Dutchman
Medal record
Sailing
Representing Canada
Pan American Games
Bronze medal – third place	1967 Winnipeg	Flying Dutchman

Peter Michael Byrne (5 March 1936 – 17 August 2017) was a Canadian sailor. He competed in the Flying Dutchman event at the 1972 Summer Olympics.
