= Hans Fogh =

Danish sailor

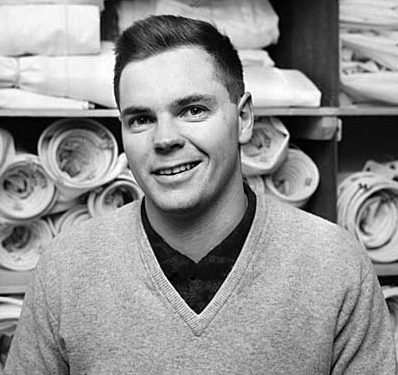
- Hans Fogh in 1964

Personal information
- Full name: Hans Marius Fogh
- Nationality: Canadian
- Born: 8 March 1938 Rødovre, Denmark
- Died: 14 March 2014 (aged 76) Toronto, Ontario, Canada
- Height: 171 cm (5 ft 7 in)
- Weight: 73 kg (161 lb)

Sailing career
- Sport: Sailing
- Club: Hellerup Sejlklub; Etobicoke Yacht Club
- Classes: Flying Dutchman; Soling
Medal record
Representing Denmark
Olympic Games
Silver medal – second place	1960 Naples	Flying Dutchman
World Championships
Gold medal – first place	1962 St. Petersburg	Flying Dutchman
Gold medal – first place	1973 Rochester	Flying Dutchman
Gold medal – first place	1974 Sydney	Soling
Bronze medal – third place	1974 Weymouth	Flying Dutchman
European Championships
Gold medal – first place	1960 Sandhamn	Flying Dutchman
Silver medal – second place	1964 Whitstable	Flying Dutchman
Representing Canada
Olympic Games
Bronze medal – third place	1984 Los Angeles	Soling
World Championships
Gold medal – first place	2006 Annapolis	Soling
Silver medal – second place	2012 Milwaukee	Soling
Bronze medal – third place	1978 Rio de Janeiro	Soling
Pan American Games
Silver medal – second place	1987 Indianapolis	Soling
European Championships
Gold medal – first place	1976 Hyères	Flying Dutchman
Gold medal – first place	1978 Kiel	Soling
Gold medal – first place	1982 Dragør	Soling
Gold medal – first place	1983 Medemblik	Soling
Bronze medal – third place	1987 Karlshamn	Soling
North American Championships
Gold medal – first place	1984 Kingston	Soling
Gold medal – first place	2008 Toronto	Soling
Gold medal – first place	2010 Bath	Soling
Gold medal – first place	2013 Plattsburgh	Soling
Silver medal – second place	1993 Rochester	Soling
Silver medal – second place	1994 Seawanhaka	Soling
Silver medal – second place	1998 Rochester	Soling
Silver medal – second place	1999 Toronto	Soling
Silver medal – second place	2005 Toronto	Soling
Silver medal – second place	2007 Wilmette	Soling
Silver medal – second place	2009 Plattsburgh	Soling
Bronze medal – third place	2011 Kingston	Soling
- Updated on 17 March 2014

Hans Marius Fogh (8 March 1938 – 14 March 2014) was one of the most successful competitive sailors in history, with dozens of national and international championships and in many different classes, including two Olympic medals.

== Olympic career ==
=== Representing Denmark ===
Fogh represented his country of birth for the first time during the 1960 Summer Olympics in Naples as helmsman in the Danish Flying Dutchman Skum with Ole Gunnar Petersen as crew, and won the silver medal. In 1964 Fogh returned to the Olympics in Enoshima again with Ole Gunnar Petersen as crew, Fogh took 4th place in the Sailing at the 1964 Summer Olympics – Flying Dutchman Miss Denmark 1964. With crew Niels Jensen and again in the Sailing at the 1968 Summer Olympics – Flying Dutchman, Fogh took 16th place in the 1968 in Acapulco. The last time Fogh represented Denmark at the Olympics was in the Flying Dutchman during the 1972 Olympics in Kiel. With Ulrik Brock as crew, Fogh took 7th place.

=== Representing Canada ===
After Fogh emigrated to Canada he was selected to represent his new country at the 1976 Summer Olympics in Kingston. With Evert Bastet as crew, Fogh took 4th place in the Sailing at the 1976 Summer Olympics – Flying Dutchman. His final Olympic appearance came in the Soling at the Los Angeles 1984 Summer Olympics. With fellow crew members Steve Calder and John Kerr Fogh, as helmsman took the bronze medal.

== Personal life ==
Born on 8 March 1938 in Rødovre, Denmark, Fogh grew up in a family of gardeners and was expected to take over the family business. With the encouragement and support of long-time friend and fellow sailor Paul Henderson, who managed to lever Fogh's former career as a gardener, Fogh emigrated to Canada in the 1969 and gained Canadian citizenship in 1975. Fogh was married to Kirsten for 49 years. They have two sons (Morten and Thomas) and five grandchildren. Hans Fogh died from Creutzfeldt–Jakob disease on 14 March 2014 in Toronto.

== Professional life ==
Expected to work in gardening, like the rest of his family, Fogh took a job at Elvstrøm Sails where he learned the skills of sailmaking. In 1969 he set up a new sailmaking loft in Canada: Elvstrom Canada. Later he produced sails under the labels: Fogh Sails and North Sails. His involvement in the development of the standard Laser sail and the subsequent Laser Radial sail, as well as the Laser 28 sails are of his many well-known accomplishments in his profession.

== Sailing career ==
Hans Fogh won countless World, Continental, and National Championships in even so many Olympic, International, and National Classes. Hans took part of six Olympic Games (1960, 1964, 1968, 1972, 1976 and 1984) and took a silver medal in the Soling during the Pan Am Games in 1987. A list of major championships is given on the right.

He helmed Evergreen for Don Green during the 1978 Canada's Cup. He sailed on Canada II during the 1987 Louis Vuitton Cup.

Fogh is an Honoured member of the Canada Sports Hall of Fame from 1985, Canadian Olympic Sports Hall of Fame 1986 and the Etobicoke Sports Halls of Fame.

== See also ==
- List of athletes with the most appearances at Olympic Games
