= Klaus Hendriksen =

Brazilian sailor

Personal information
- Nationality: Brazilian
- Born: 1 July 1937 Hamburg, Germany
- Died: 1 December 2018 (aged 81)

Sailing career
- Sport: Sailing
- Class: Flying Dutchman
Medal record
Sailing
Representing Brazil
Pan American Games
Gold medal – first place	1963 São Paulo	Flying Dutchman

Klaus Hendriksen (1 July 1937 – 1 December 2018) was a Brazilian sailor. He competed in the Flying Dutchman event at the 1964 Summer Olympics.
