= Peter Ficker =

Brazilian sailor (born 1951)

Medal record

Sailing

Representing Brazil

Olympic Games
Bronze medal – third place	1976 Montreal	Flying Dutchman

Peter Ficker (born 8 June 1951) is a Brazilian sailor. He won a bronze medal in the Flying Dutchman Class with Reinaldo Conrad at the 1976 Summer Olympics.
