= Frank Hübner =

German sailor

Personal information
- Born: 16 October 1950 (age 75) Lüdenscheid, Nordrhein-Westfalen
- Height: 180 cm (5 ft 11 in)
- Weight: 67 kg (148 lb)

Sailing career
- Sport: Sailing
- Club: Segel-Club Sorpesee Iserlohn
Medal record
Sailing
Representing West Germany
Olympic Games
| Gold medal – first place | 1976 Montreal | 470 class |

Frank Hübner (born 16 October 1950) is a German sailor and Olympic champion. He won a gold medal in the 470 Class with Harro Bode at the 1976 Summer Olympics in Montreal He was also a producer for the 2002 Film Whale Rider.
