= Burkhard Cordes =

Brazilian sailor

Medal record

Sailing

Representing Brazil

Olympic Games
Bronze medal – third place	1968 Acapulco	Flying Dutchman

Pan American Games
Silver medal – second place	1967 Winnipeg	Flying Dutchman
Gold medal – first place	1975 Mexico City	Flying Dutchman

Burkhard Cordes (born 15 May 1939 in Darmstadt, Germany) is a Brazilian sailor. He won a bronze medal in the Flying Dutchman Class with Reinaldo Conrad at the 1968 Summer Olympics.
