= Peter Naumann =

German sailor

Medal record

Men's Sailing

Representing West Germany

Olympic Games
Silver medal – second place	1968 Acapulco, Mexico	Flying Dutchman
Bronze medal – third place	1972 Kiel, Germany	Flying Dutchman

Peter Naumann (12 October 1941 – 11 February 2024) was a German sailor. He won a silver medal in the Flying Dutchman Class at the 1968 Summer Olympics and a bronze medal at the 1972 Summer Olympics with Ullrich Libor.
