= John Mathias (sailor) =

American sailor

Personal information
- Full name: John Gilbert Mathias Jr.
- Born: January 26, 1949 (age 77) Buffalo, New York, U.S.

Sailing career
- Sport: Sailing
- Class: Flying Dutchman
Medal record
Sailing
Representing United States
Pan American Games
Bronze medal – third place	1975 Mexico City	Flying Dutchman

John Gilbert Mathias Jr. (born January 26, 1949) is an American sailor. He competed in the Flying Dutchman event at the 1976 Summer Olympics.
