= Sailing at the 1976 Summer Olympics =

Sailing at the Games of the XXI Olympiad
- Emblem of the Montreal 1976 Summer Olympics
- Venues: Kingston
- Dates: First race: 19 July 1976; Last race: 27 July 1976
- Competitors: 257 (256 male), (1 female) from 40 nations
- Boats: 130

Sailing/Yachting is an Olympic sport starting from the Games of the 1st Olympiad (1896 Olympics in Athens, Greece). With the exception of 1904 and the canceled 1916 Summer Olympics, sailing has always been included on the Olympic schedule. The sailing program of 1976 consisted of six sailing classes (disciplines). For each class, seven races were scheduled from 19 July 1976 to 27 July 1976 off the coast of Kingston, Ontario, on Lake Ontario. The sailing was done on the triangular-type Olympic courses.

== Venue ==
Portsmouth Olympic Harbour Olympic Flame
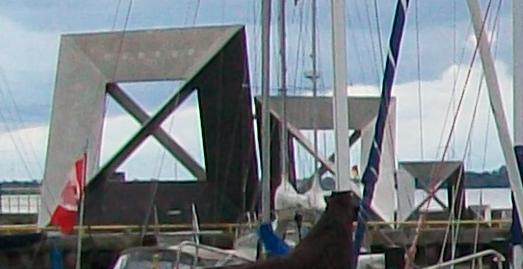
- Interactive map of Portsmouth Olympic Harbour; Olympic Flame
- Coordinates: 44°13′03″N 76°30′31″W

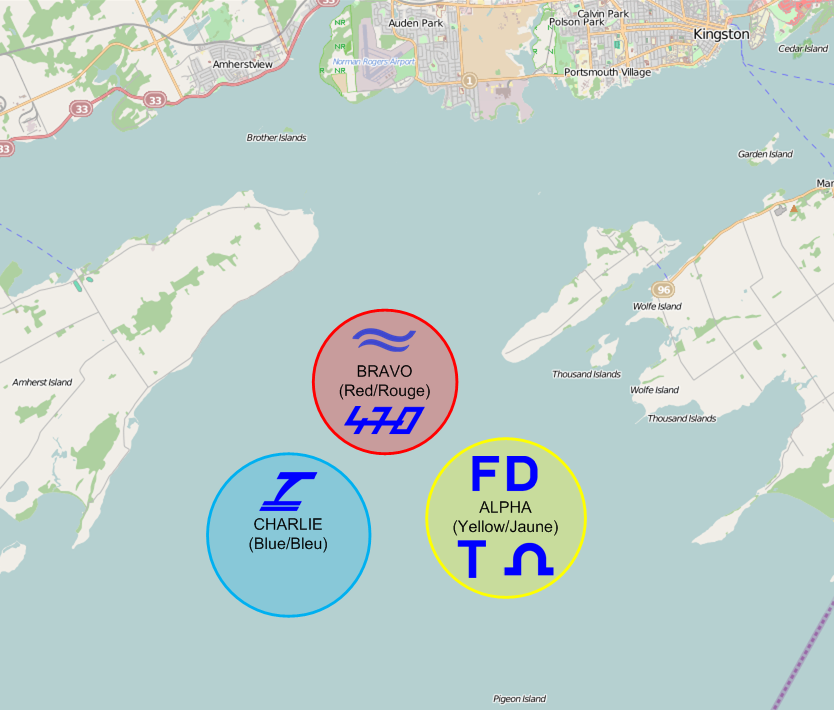
Olympic Course Area's 1976.

According to the IOC statutes the contests in all sport disciplines must be held either in, or as close as possible to the city which the IOC has chosen. Since Montréal was not a suitable place the Portsmouth Olympic Harbour Kingston, Ontario, constructed in 1969, was reconstructed in 1974 in time for the 1976 Olympic Sailing event. A total of three race areas were created on Lake Ontario.

The distance from the Portsmouth Olympic Harbour to course area Bravo (red) was about 5 nmi (9.3 km) From there it was another 5 nmi (9.3 km) to the course area's Alpha (yellow) and Charlie (blue). This however ensured wind conditions without local effects.

== Competition ==
=== Overview ===
| Continents | Countries | Classes | Boats | Male | Female |
|---|---|---|---|---|---|
| 4 | 40 | 6 | 130 | 256 | 1 |

=== Continents ===
- Asia
- Oceania
- Europe
- Americas

=== Countries ===
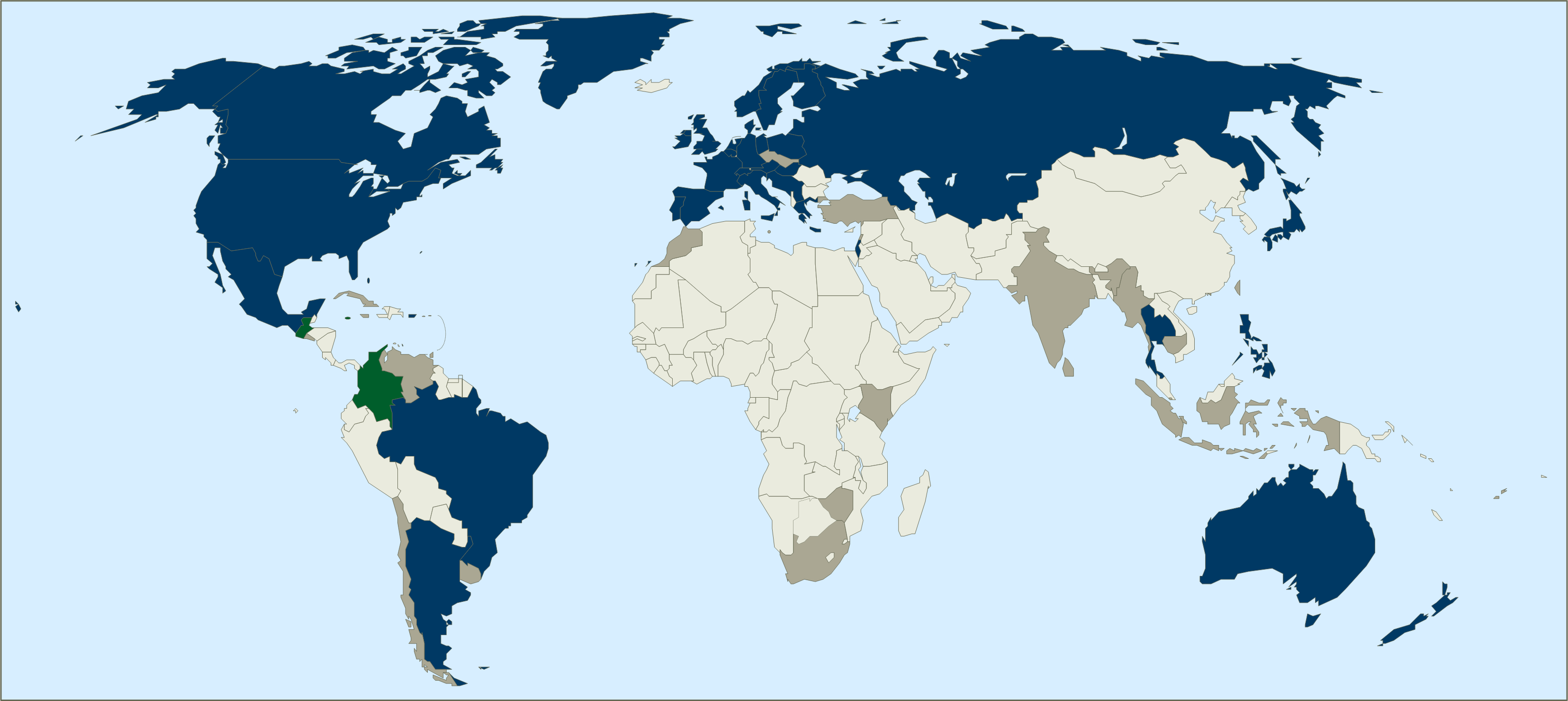
Countries that participated in the Sailing event of the 1976 Olympic Games. Blue: Water Gray: Never participated in OG Dark Gray: Participated in earlier OG Green: Country participated for the first time Dark Blue: Country participated also on previous games Red: Country boycotted the sailing event of the OG

| Argentina | Australia | Austria |
| Bahamas | Belgium | Bermuda |
| Brazil | Canada | Cayman Islands |
| Colombia | Denmark | Spain |
| Finland | France | Great Britain |
| East Germany | West Germany | Greece |
| Guatemala | Hungary | Ireland |
| Israel | Virgin Islands | Italy |
| Japan | Mexico | Monaco |
| Netherlands | Norway | New Zealand |
| Philippines | Poland | Portugal |
| Puerto Rico | Switzerland | Sweden |
| Thailand | Soviet Union | United States |
Yugoslavia

=== Classes (equipment) ===
| Class | Type | Event | Sailors | Trapeze | Mainsail | Jib/Genoa | Spinnaker | First OG | Olympics so far |
|---|---|---|---|---|---|---|---|---|---|
| Finn | Dinghy | | 1 | 0 | + | – | – | 1952 | 7 |
| 470 | Dinghy | | 2 | 1 | + | + | + | 1976 | 1 |
| Flying Dutchman | Dinghy | | 2 | 1 | + | + | + | 1960 | 5 |
| Tornado | Catamaran | | 2 | 1 | + | + | – | 1976 | 1 |
| Tempest | Keelboat | | 2 | 1 | + | + | + | 1972 | 2 |
| Soling | Keelboat | | 3 | 0 | + | + | + | 1972 | 2 |

1976 Olympic Classes designs

== Medal summary ==
| Event | Gold | Silver | Bronze |
|---|---|---|---|
| 1976: Finn | East Germany (GDR); Jochen Schümann | Soviet Union (URS); Andrei Balashov | Australia (AUS); John Bertrand |
| 1976: 470 | West Germany (FRG); Frank Hübner; Harro Bode | Spain (ESP); Antonio Gorostegui; Pedro Millet | Australia (AUS); Ian Brown; Ian Ruff |
| 1976: Flying Dutchman | West Germany (FRG); Jörg Diesch; Eckart Diesch | Great Britain (GBR); Rodney Pattisson; Julian Brooke-Houghton | Brazil (BRA); Reinaldo Conrad; Peter Ficker |
| 1976: Tornado | Great Britain (GBR); Reginald White; John Osborn | United States (USA); David McFaull; Michael Rothwell | West Germany (FRG); Jörg Spengler; Jörg Schmall |
| 1976: Tempest | Sweden (SWE); John Albrechtson; Ingvar Hansson | Soviet Union (URS); Valentin Mankin; Vladyslav Akimenko | United States (USA); Dennis Conner; Conn Findlay |
| 1976: Soling | Denmark (DEN); Poul Richard Høj Jensen; Valdemar Bandolowski; Erik Hansen | United States (USA); John Kolius; Walter Glasgow; Richard Hoepfner | East Germany (GDR); Dieter Below; Olaf Engelhardt; Michael Zachries |

== Medal table ==
| Rank | Nation | Gold | Silver | Bronze | Total |
|---|---|---|---|---|---|
| 1 | West Germany | 2 | 0 | 1 | 3 |
| 2 | Great Britain | 1 | 1 | 0 | 2 |
| 3 | East Germany | 1 | 0 | 1 | 2 |
| 4 | Denmark | 1 | 0 | 0 | 1 |
| 4 | Sweden | 1 | 0 | 0 | 1 |
| 6 | United States | 0 | 2 | 1 | 3 |
| 7 | Soviet Union | 0 | 2 | 0 | 2 |
| 8 | Spain | 0 | 1 | 0 | 1 |
| 9 | Australia | 0 | 0 | 2 | 2 |
| 10 | Brazil | 0 | 0 | 1 | 1 |
| Totals (10 entries) | | 6 | 6 | 6 | 18 |

== Remarks ==
=== Facilities ===
At the Portsmouth area a new Olympic facility was constructed. This building was built to contain all facilities needed during that period. It holds, for instance, a large measurement hall and several exercise rooms. Only the size of the overhead doors of the measurement hall was not wide enough to bring a fully assembled Tornado in. Each had to be lifted on one side to enter diagonally.

=== Sailing ===
After the races in the Tempest an unprecedented incident occurred:

Alan Warren and David Hunt set their Tempest on fire. With this boat they won the silver medal in 1972 though during the transport to Canada the boat called "Gift 'orse" was damaged. Warren and Hunt ended in Kingston in 14th position. After the incident Warren stated: "The Horse was lame and we had to put her down."

The story did not end there as Canada Customs could not accept the boat was not available for them to inspect.

=== Sailors ===
During the sailing regattas at the 1972 Summer Olympics among others the following persons were competing in the various classes:

- Colombia, The only female competitor Beatriz de Lisocky in the 470. (This generated a lot of discussion in the media.)
- Belgium, President International Olympic Committee, Jacques Rogge in the Finn
- Australia, John Bertrand in the Finn
- East Germany, Jochen Schümann in the Finn
- Great Britain, Rodney Pattisson Already two times gold medalist in the Flying Dutchman
- Soviet Union, Valentin Mankin Already two times gold medalist in the Tempest
- United States, Dennis Conner America's Cup legend in the Tempest
- Denmark, Poul Richard Høj Jensen multiple winner of World Championships in the Soling
- Austria, Hubert Raudaschl currently holds the record of competing Olympic Games (9) in the Soling
Sailors at the 1976 Olympic Games
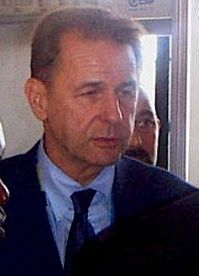
In Finn:
Jacques Rogge

== Sources ==
- Louis Chantigny, ed. (1978). Montréal 1976 Official Report, Volume I: Organization. Ottawa: COJO. Archived from the original (PDF) on 23 May 2011.
- Louis Chantigny, ed. (1978). Montréal 1976 Official Report, Volume II: Facilities. Ottawa: COJO. Archived from the original (PDF) on 23 May 2011.
- Louis Chantigny, ed. (1978). Montréal 1976 Official Report, Volume III: Results. Ottawa: COJO. Archived from the original (PDF) on 23 May 2011.
- Evans, Hilary; Gjerde, Arild; Heijmans, Jeroen; Mallon, Bill; et al. "Sailing at the 1976 Montréal Summer Games: Sailing". Olympics at Sports-Reference.com. Sports Reference LLC. Archived from the original on 17 April 2020.
- Hugh Drake & Paul Henderson (2009). Canada's Olympic Sailing Legacy, Paris 1924 – Beijing 2008. Toronto: CYA.
- Official IYRU movie of the 1976 Olympics
