= Rawle Barrow =

Trinidad and Tobago sailor (1934–2014)

Personal information
- Full name: Rawle Hamilton D. Barrow
- Born: 21 September 1934 Saint James, Trinidad and Tobago
- Died: 28 March 2014 (aged 79)
- Height: 178 cm (5 ft 10 in)
- Weight: 82 kg (181 lb)

Sailing career
- Sport: Sailing
- Class: Flying Dutchman
Medal record
Sailing
Representing British West Indies
Pan American Games
Bronze medal – third place	1959 Chicago	Flying Dutchman

Rawle Hamilton D. Barrow (21 September 1934 – 28 March 2014) was a Trinidad and Tobago sailor. He competed in the Flying Dutchman event at the 1964 Summer Olympics.
