= Club de Yates de Acapulco =

Yacht club in Acapulco, Mexico

Coordinates: 16°50′16″N 99°54′17″W

- Burgee
- Founded: 1955
- Location: Acapulco, Mexico
- Website: www.clubdeyatesdeacapulco.com

Club de Yates de Acapulco (English: Acapulco Yacht Club) is a yacht club located in Acapulco, Mexico. Opened in December 1955, it served as host of the sailing events for the 1968 Summer Olympics in Mexico City.

Since the 1968 Games, the yacht club continues to serve as a sailing venue.
