= Christopher Davies (sailor) =

British sailor

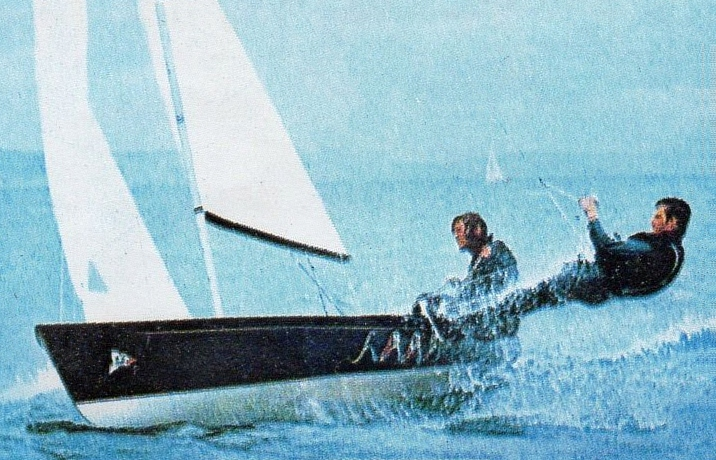
- Pattisson and Davies at the 1972 Olympics

Personal information
- Born: 29 June 1946 (age 80)
- Height: 187 cm (6 ft 2 in)
- Weight: 81 kg (179 lb)

Sailing career
- Sport: Sailing
Medal record
Representing the United Kingdom
Olympic Games
Gold medal – first place	1972 Kiel	Flying Dutchman

Christopher Davies (born 29 June 1946) is a British sailor. He won a gold medal in the Flying Dutchman class with Rodney Pattisson at the 1972 Summer Olympics.

He now sails at Portchester Sailing club, within the upper reaches of Portsmouth Harbour. He currently sails a Solo or a Siren with his wife Ingrid.
