= Uwe Steingroß =

German sailor

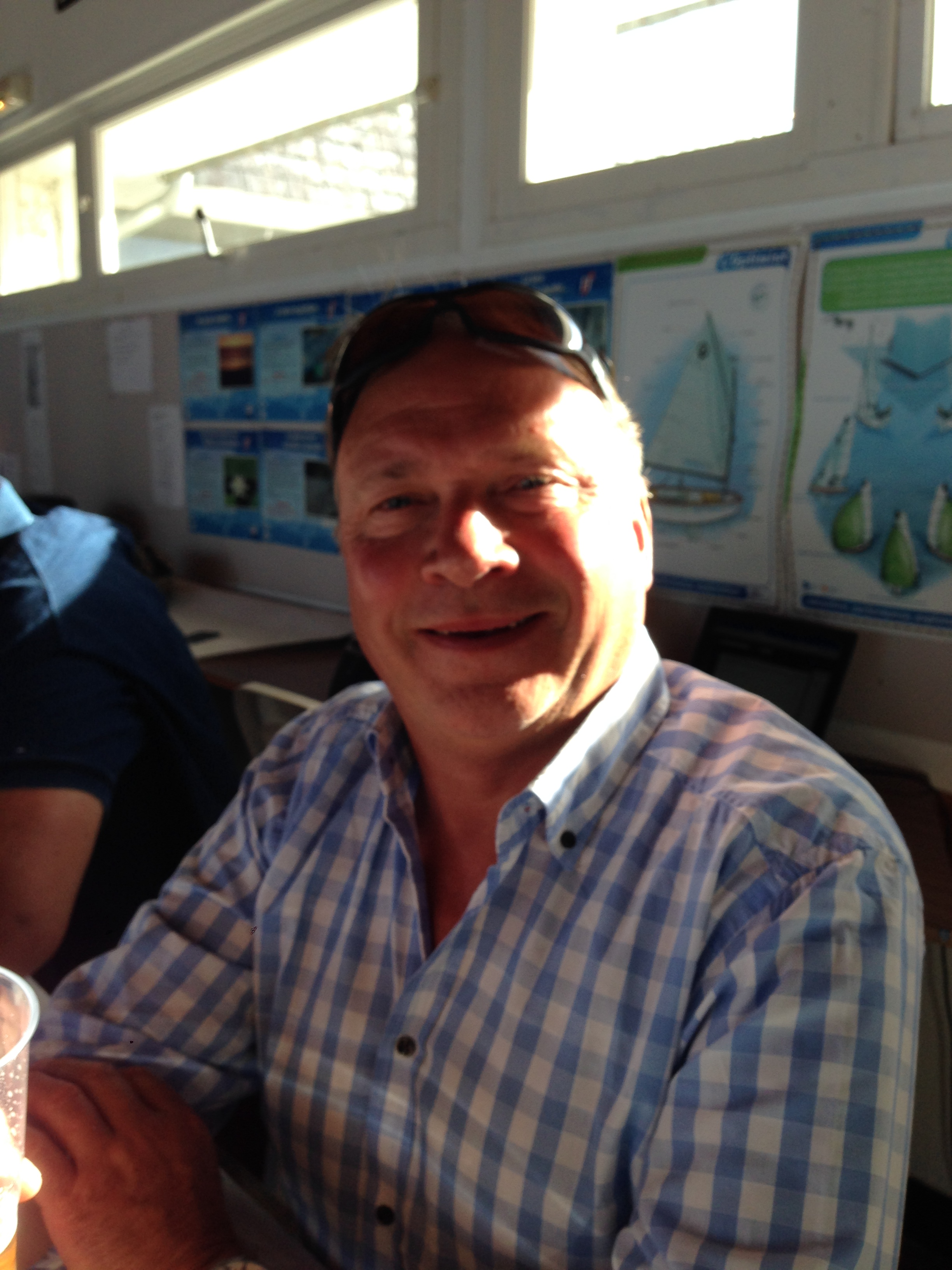
- Steingroß during the 2014 European Soling Championship

Personal information
- Full name: Uwe Steingroß
- Nationality: German
- Born: 19 April 1951 (age 75) Berlin, Germany

Sailing career
- Sport: Sailing
- Club: SC Berlin-Grünau
- Class(es): Flying Dutchman; Tornado
- Updated on 2014-06-22

Uwe Steingroß (born 19 April 1951) is a German sailor who competed in the 1976 Summer Olympics with Jörg Schramme, and the 1980 Summer Olympics.
