= Reinaldo Conrad =

Brazilian sailor (born 1942)

Medal record

Sailing

Representing Brazil

Olympic Games
Bronze medal – third place	1968 Acapulco	Flying Dutchman
Bronze medal – third place	1976 Montreal	Flying Dutchman

Pan American Games
Silver medal – second place	1967 Winnipeg	Flying Dutchman
Gold medal – first place	1975 Mexico City	Flying Dutchman

Reinaldo Conrad (born 31 May 1942) is a Brazilian sailor. He won a bronze medal in the Flying Dutchman Class at the 1968 Summer Olympics and the 1976 Summer Olympics.

Reinaldo Conrad was also champion of the 1959 Pan American Games (with Antonio Barros) and of the 1963 Pan American Games (with his brother Ralph Conrad) in Snipe, as well as champion of the 1975 Pan American Games and 2nd of the 1967 Pan American Games (with Burkhard Cordes) in Flying Dutchman. He also won the Snipe Western Hemisphere & Orient Championship with his brother, Ralph Conrad, in 1962 and 1964, and was second at the Worlds in 1969 with Mário Buckup as his crew.
