= Peter Lang (sailor, born 1963) =

German sailor

Peter Lang (born 29 January 1963) is a German Olympic sailor in the Flying Dutchman class. He crewed for Albert Batzill and finished eight in the 1988 Summer Olympics and fifth in the 1992 edition.
