= John Oakeley =

British sailor

Sir John Oakeley, Bt
Personal information
- Full name: John Digby Atholl Oakeley
- Born: 27 November 1932; Willesden, Greater London, England
- Died: 19 December 2016 (aged 84)
- Height: 172 cm (5 ft 8 in)
- Weight: 71 kg (157 lb)

Sir John Digby Atholl Oakeley, 8th Baronet (27 November 1932 – 19 December 2016) was a British sailor who competed in the 1972 Summer Olympics.

He began his career in the 1950s, winning the Merlin Rocket championship three times and the National 12 once. In addition, he was the winner of the Flying Dutchman World Championship in 1967.

Oakeley also wrote two books on sailing, Winning and This is Downwind Sailing. He died on 19 December 2016 at the age of 84.

Baronetage of Great Britain
Preceded by Atholl Oakeley	Baronet (of Shrewsbury); 1987–2016	Succeeded by Robert Oakeley
