= Rodney Pattisson =

British sailor

Rodney Pattisson MBE
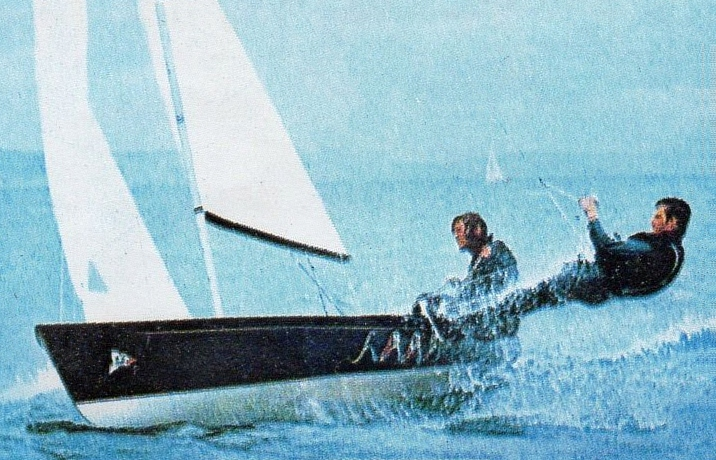
- Pattisson and Davies at the 1972 Olympics

Personal information
- Full name: Rodney Stuart Pattisson
- Born: 5 August 1943 (age 82) Campbeltown, Scotland
- Height: 175 cm (5 ft 9 in)
- Weight: 70 kg (154 lb)

Sport
- Sport: Sailing
- Club: Itchenor Sailing Club
Medal record
Representing United Kingdom
Olympic Games
Gold medal – first place	1968 Mexico City	Flying Dutchman
Gold medal – first place	1972 Munich	Flying Dutchman
Silver medal – second place	1976 Montreal	Flying Dutchman
Flying Dutchman World Championships
Gold medal – first place	1969	Naples
Gold medal – first place	1970	Adelaide
Gold medal – first place	1971	La Rochelle

Rodney Stuart Pattisson, MBE (born 5 August 1943) is a British yachtsman. He is a double Olympic gold medalist in sailing won at the 1968 Mexico City Olympics and 1972 Munich Olympics both in the Flying Dutchman class. He also won a silver medal at the 1976 Montreal Olympics in the same class to become Great Britain’s most successful Olympic yachtsman until Ben Ainslie overtook him with 3 gold medals and a silver medal at four different Olympic Games at the 2008 Beijing Olympics. Pattisson was a member of Itchenor Sailing Club.

== Sailing career ==
Pattisson was born in Campbeltown, Argyll, Scotland, where his father was posted as an airman during World War II. His family left Scotland just two months after Rodney's birth, and he has never lived in Scotland since then. (Note: Pattison doesn't consider himself to be ethnically "Scottish." However, with his consent, he was inducted into the Scottish Sports Hall of Fame in 2002. However, he found it made it hard to convince people of his true nationality and requested to be withdrawn.Campbell, Alan (9 May 2012). "Olympic sailor asks to be removed from Scottish Sports Hall of Fame.. because he's English". Daily Record. Glasgow. His example is still said to have been an important inspiration for successful Scottish sailors. "Golden Scots: Rodney Pattisson, the accidental Scot". BBC News. 20 July 2012.)

He went to school at Pangbourne College, which was founded in 1917 as the Nautical College Pangbourne. The College prepared boys to be officers in the Merchant Navy although many students joined the Royal Navy, a tradition he followed on leaving the college.

He later teamed up with the London solicitor Iain MacDonald-Smith and won the 1968 Olympic trials. They travelled to Mexico two months before the start of the Olympics in order to acclimatise themselves to the local conditions. In 1968 Pattisson and MacDonald-Smith won the gold medal in the Flying Dutchman class in the Olympic Games on their boat Supercalifragilisticexpialidocious, which was shortened by race officials to Superdocious. Notes from the race indicate that its dominating length of lead mirrored the length of name. The boat is now in the collection of the National Maritime Museum Cornwall. At the time it was noted that in winning the gold, Pattisson became the first "Scot" to win an Olympic medal in sailing. Both Pattisson and MacDonald-Smith went on to win the FD (Flying Dutchman) World Championship in 1969 and 1970. After his Olympic victory in 1968, Pattisson resigned his commission in the Royal Navy so as to give himself more time for training. As Lieutenant Rodney Stuart Pattisson, he was appointed a Member of the Order of the British Empire (MBE) in the 1969 New Year Honours for his services to yachting. He won another World Championship in 1971, but this time it was with Julian Brooke-Houghton. A second Olympic gold medal followed in 1972 with Christopher Davies and in 1976 Pattisson took the silver medal again with Julian Brooke-Houghton. Pattisson was honoured by being the flag-bearer at the opening ceremony of the 1976 Montreal Olympics.

Pattisson then retired from the Olympics and later co-skippered the Victory 83, the Peter de Savary entry in the America's Cup in 1983.

He was later elected to the Sailing Hall of Fame and Scottish Sports Hall of Fame. He later asked to be withdrawn from the Scottish Sports Hall of Fame in 2012 as he does not consider himself Scottish.

== Published works ==
- Pattisson, Rodney; Davison, Tim; Hore, Tim (1986). Tactics (Sail to Win) (Print). Camden, Me: International Marine Pub. Co. ISBN 0-87742-233-8.
- Pattisson, Rodney; Davison, Tim; Hore, Tim (1986). Boatspeed: supercharging your hull, foils and gear. (Sail to Win) (Print). Steyning, W. Sussex: Fernhurst Books. ISBN 0-906754-25-9.
