= Mario Capio =

Italian sailor (1924–2000)

Mario Capio (Nervi, 3 August 1924 – Nervi, 8 February 2000) was an Italian sailor who competed in the 1956 Summer Olympics, in the 1960 Summer Olympics, and in the 1964 Summer Olympics.

In 1955, he won the Snipe World Championship, and in 1959 the Flying Dutchman World Championships.
