= Roger Tiriau =

French sailor

Roger Tiriau (22 October 1928 – 21 August 1984) was a French sailor who competed in the 1968 Summer Olympics.
