= Ole Gunnar Petersen =

Danish sailor

Personal information
- Full name: Ole Erik Gunnar Petersen
- Nationality: Danish
- Born: 30 December 1934 (age 91) Frederiksberg, Denmark
- Height: 1.76 m (5.8 ft)

Sailing career
- Sport: Sailing
- Club: Hellerup Sejlklub
- Class: Flying Dutchman
Competition record
Representing Denmark
Olympic Games
Silver medal – second place	1960 Naples	Flying Dutchman
- Updated on 17 March 2014

Ole Erik Gunnar Petersen (born 30 December 1934, in Frederiksberg) is a sailor from Denmark. Petersen represented his country at the 1960 Summer Olympics in Naples. Petersen took Silver in the Danish Flying Dutchman Skum with Hans Fogh as helmsman. Petersen returned to the Olympic regatta in 1964 Summer Olympics in Enoshima. This time, again with Hans Fogh as helmsman he took 4th place in the Flying Dutchman Miss Danmark 1964.
