= Alan Warren (sailor) =

British sailor

Medal record

Sailing

Representing the United Kingdom

Olympic Games
Silver medal – second place	1972 Munich	Tempest

Alan Kemp Warren (born 13 December 1935) is a British sailor. He won a silver medal in the Tempest class with David Hunt at the 1972 Summer Olympics.
