= Michel Buzzi =

Swiss sailor

Personal information
- Nationality: Swiss
- Born: 25 June 1939 (age 85); Geneva, Switzerland

Sport
- Sport: Sailing

Michel Buzzi (born 25 June 1939) is a Swiss sailor. He competed at the 1960 Summer Olympics and the 1964 Summer Olympics.
