= Jock Bilger =

New Zealand sailor

Personal information
- Nationality: New Zealand
- Born: 25 November 1936 (age 88); Rustenburg, South Africa

Sport
- Sport: Sailing

Jock Bilger (born 25 November 1936) is a New Zealand sailor. He competed at the 1972 Summer Olympics and the 1976 Summer Olympics.
