= Emilio Massino =

Italian sailor

Emilio Massino (16 November 1925 – 14 April 2013) was an Italian sailor who competed in the 1956 Summer Olympics.
