= Vincent Berger =

French sailor

Personal information
- Nationality: French
- Born: 1 February 1967 (age 58); Metz, France

Sport
- Sport: Sailing

Vincent Berger (born 1 February 1967) is a French sailor. He competed in the Flying Dutchman event at the 1992 Summer Olympics.
