= Bengt Hagander =

Swedish sailor (born 1956)

Personal information
- Nationality: Swedish
- Born: 23 November 1956 (age 69) Malmö, Sweden

Sport
- Sport: Sailing

Bengt Hagander (born 23 November 1956) is a Swedish sailor. He competed in the Flying Dutchman event at the 1984 Summer Olympics.
