= Greg Knowles =

New Zealand sailor

Personal information
- Nationality: New Zealand
- Born: 10 September 1963 (age 61); Auckland, New Zealand

Sport
- Sport: Sailing

Greg Knowles (born 10 September 1963) is a New Zealand sailor. He competed at the 1988 Summer Olympics and the 1992 Summer Olympics.
