= Magnus Kjell =

Swedish sailor

Personal information
- Nationality: Swedish
- Born: 20 August 1958 (age 66); Stockholm, Sweden

Sport
- Sport: Sailing

Magnus Kjell (born 20 August 1958) is a Swedish sailor. He competed in the Flying Dutchman event at the 1984 Summer Olympics.
