= Terry McLaughlin =

Canadian sailor (born 1956)

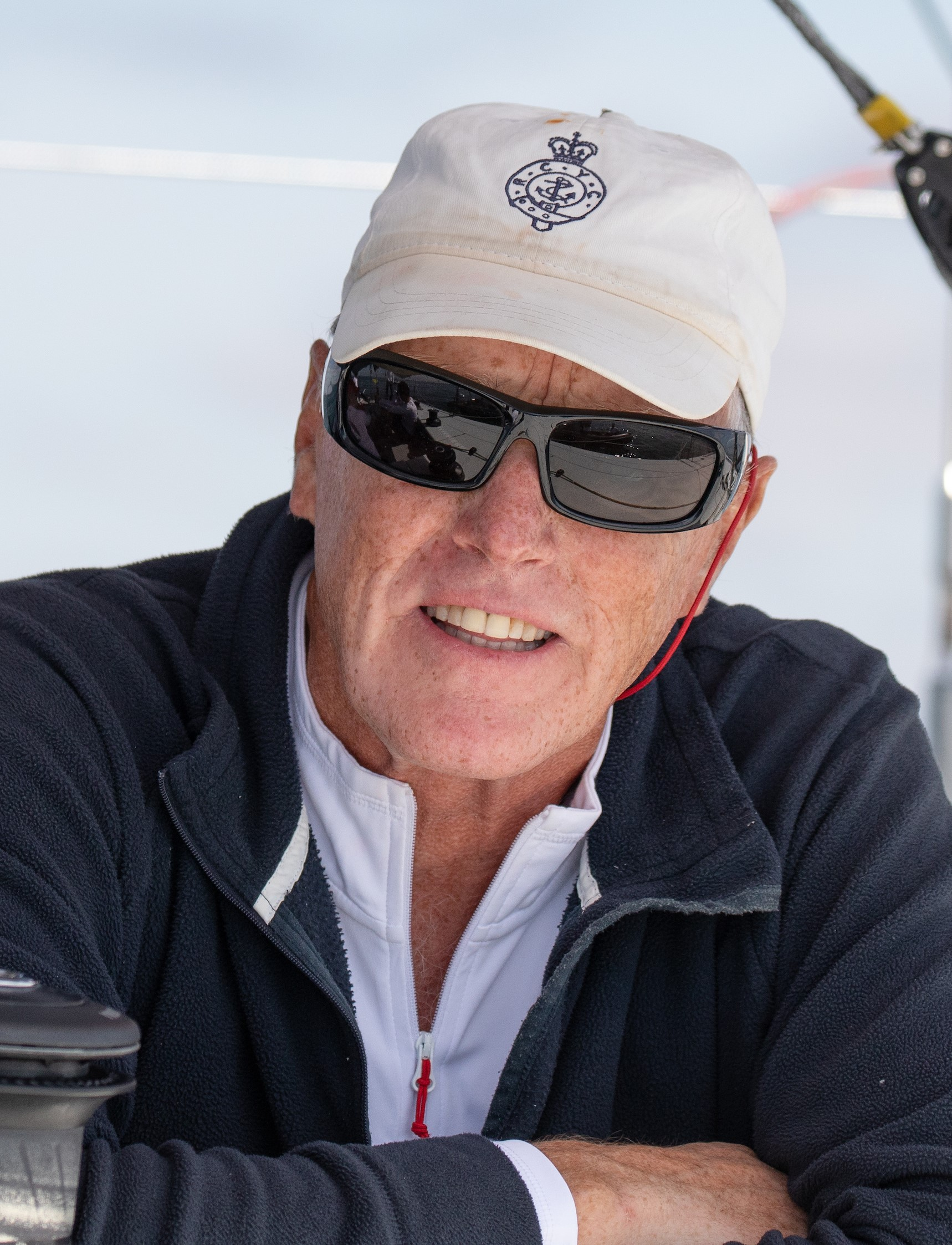
- Terry McLaughlin 2021 at Canada's Cup

Personal information
- Full name: Terence McLaughlin
- Born: July 24, 1956 (age 70) Toronto, Ontario, Canada

Sailing career
- Sport: Sailing
- Club: Royal Canadian Yacht Club
Medal record
Sailing
Representing Canada
Olympic Games
Silver medal – second place	1984 Los Angeles	Flying Dutchman
Pan American Games
Silver medal – second place	2015 Toronto	J/24

Terence McLaughlin (born 1956) is a Canadian sailor and Olympics silver medallist.

== Biography ==
McLaughlin was born July 24, 1956, in Toronto, Ontario to Paul McLaughlin and his wife Mary. His father competed in the 1948 Olympic dinghy regatta. He attended St. Michael's College School and then majored in economics at Queen's University.

In 1980 McLaughlin and his crew Evert Bastet won the 1980 World Championship in the Flying Dutchman class.

McLaughlin won a silver medal in the Flying Dutchman Class at the Los Angeles 1984 Summer Olympics with Evert Bastet. He wished to have competed in the Moscow 1980 Summer Olympics but was unable due to the boycott of the event by western countries.

McLaughlin unsuccessfully helmed Canada One in the 1983 Louis Vuitton Cup that determined the challenger for the America's Cup.

McLaughlin won the York Cup match-racing series five times

McLaughlin skippered yachts named Reliant (owned by Paul James Phelan) and Defiant (owned by Paul L'Heureux), out of RCYC, to win the 2001, 2003, 2021 and 2022 editions of the Canada's Cup.

He was awarded the 2001 and 2013 Rolex Sailor of the Year.

McLaughlin skippered the Royal Canadian Yacht Club Swan 42 yacht Daring owned by John Hele, with crew comprising navigator Allan Megarry, mainsail trimmer David Jarvis, jib trimmer Andrew McTavish, offside jib trimmer and strategist John Millen, boat captain and pitman Jim Gibson, spinnaker trimmer Rob Gale, mastman Will Gyles and bowman Sandy Andrews to win the 2011 and 2013 New York Yacht Club Invitational Cups and the 2013 Swan 42 National Championships.

McLaughlin and his crew Sandy Andrews, David Ogden, and David Jarvis won the J24 silver medal at the 2015 Pan American Games in Toronto in 2015.

McLaughlin helmed an 8 Metre yacht Bangalore (owned by Meuring/Howard) in 3 World 8 Metre championships. In 2010 he and his team were second in the 8 Metre Worlds. In 2016 he won the 8-Metre Worlds and Sira Cups with a team comprising Geoff Moore, Shannon Howard, Bart Meuring, Jeff Gillmeister, Robb Graham and Jason Williams as crew. In 2017 he placed third in the Sira Division of the 8 Metre World Championships in Norway with team comprising John Millen (sailor), Shannon Howard, Bart Meuring, Jeff Gillmeister, Robb Graham, Geoff Moore and Sandy Andrews.

In a J105 – Mandate, co-owned by McLaughlin and Rod Wilmer, he skippered to win the 2014, 2016, 2018 and 2024 J105 North American Championships with crews, which have included Rod Wilmer, Graham Hicks, Fraser Howell, Ian Howes, Andrew Kenny, Evert McLaughlin and John Millen
