= Tullio Pizzorno =

Italian sailor

Tullio Pizzorno (10 February 1921 in Greco Milanese – 28 July 1988 in Thiene) was an Italian sailor who competed in the 1960 Summer Olympics.
