= Julian Brooke-Houghton =

British sailor

Medal record

Sailing

Representing the United Kingdom

Olympic Games
Silver medal – second place	1976 Montreal	Flying Dutchman

Julian Brooke-Houghton (born 16 December 1946) is a British sailor. He won a silver medal in the Flying Dutchman class with Rodney Pattisson at the 1976 Summer Olympics.
