= Timothy Alexander =

Australian sailor

Timothy Alexander (born 10 January 1949) is an Australian sailor who competed in the 1972 Summer Olympics and in the 1976 Summer Olympics.
