= Ingo von Bredow =

German sailor (1939–2015)

Medal record

Men's sailing

Representing Germany

Olympic Games
Bronze medal – third place	1960 Rome	Flying Dutchman

Ingo von Bredow (12 December 1939 – 4 November 2015) was a German sailor. He won the Olympic Bronze Medal Flying Dutchman in 1960 Rome along with Rolf Mulka.
