= Simon Mander =

New Zealand sailor

Personal information
- Nationality: New Zealand
- Born: 31 January 1964 (age 61); Christchurch, New Zealand

Sport
- Sport: Sailing

Simon Mander (born 31 January 1964) is a New Zealand sailor. He competed in the men's 470 event at the 1988 Summer Olympics.
