= Stephan Schurich =

Austrian sailor

Personal information
- Nationality: Austrian
- Born: 14 September 1967 (age 57); Salzburg, Austria

Sport
- Sport: Sailing

Stephan Schurich (born 14 September 1967) is an Austrian sailor. He competed in the Flying Dutchman event at the 1992 Summer Olympics.
