= Viktor Budantsev =

Belarusian sailor (born 1961)

Personal information
- Nationality: Belarusian
- Born: 21 January 1961 (age 65) Artik, Armenian SSR, USSR

Sport
- Sport: Sailing

Viktor Budantsev is a famous sailor, who crewed in the Flying Dutchman class. He was born 21 January 1961 in Artik, Armenia in the USSR), He lives in Belarus. He competed at the 1988 Summer Olympics for the USSR and the 1992 Summer Olympics for Russia, both in FDs. He crewed on a Tornado in the 1996 Summer Olympics for Belarus.

1987 Flying Dutchman World Championship in Kiel, Germany, First place: Luis Doreste and Andor Serra (ESP 70) won with 71.7 total points. There were 80 FDs from 26 nations. Second place: Sergei Borodinov and Viktor Budantsjev (EUN 1) – 72.0 pts. Viktor told Douglas Parker he lost the worlds by ONE metre in the last race,
