= Ulf Lehmann =

German sailor

Personal information
- Nationality: German
- Born: 4 February 1958 (age 67); Wusterhausen, Germany

Sport
- Sport: Sailing

Ulf Lehmann (born 4 February 1958) is a German former sailor. He competed in the Flying Dutchman event at the 1988 Summer Olympics.
