= Stefan Mädicke =

German sailor

Personal information
- Nationality: German
- Born: 22 February 1966 (age 59); Halle, Germany

Sport
- Sport: Sailing

Stefan Mädicke (born 22 February 1966) is a German sailor. He competed in the Flying Dutchman event at the 1988 Summer Olympics.
