= Vladyslav Akimenko =

Soviet sailor (born 1953)

Medal record

Sailing

Representing Soviet Union

Olympic Games
Silver medal – second place	1976 Montreal	Tempest class

Vladyslav Ivanovich Akymenko (Russian: Владислав Іванович Акименко; born 5 March 1953) was a Soviet sailor. He won a Silver medal at the 1976 Summer Olympics in Montreal in the Tempest class, along with Valentin Mankin.
