= Jacob Bojsen-Møller =

Danish sailor

Personal information
- Nationality: Danish
- Born: 26 April 1956 (age 68); Stege, Denmark

Sport
- Sport: Sailing

Jacob Bojsen-Møller (born 26 April 1956) is a Danish sailor. He competed at the 1980 Summer Olympics and the 1984 Summer Olympics.
