= Jörg Hotz =

Swiss sailor

Personal information
- Nationality: Swiss
- Born: 28 October 1951 (age 73)

Sport
- Sport: Sailing

Jörg Hotz (born 28 October 1951) is a Swiss sailor. He competed in the Flying Dutchman event at the 1976 Summer Olympics.
