= Jean-Pierre Renevier =

Swiss sailor (1928–2021)

Personal information
- Nationality: Swiss
- Born: 29 November 1928
- Died: 23 June 2021 (aged 92)

Sport
- Sport: Sailing

Jean-Pierre Renevier (29 November 1928 – 23 June 2021) was a Swiss sailor. He competed in the Flying Dutchman event at the 1964 Summer Olympics.
