= Jörg Schramme =

German sailor

Personal information
- Nationality: German
- Born: 25 December 1951 (age 73); Leipzig, Germany

Sport
- Sport: Sailing

Jörg Schramme (born 25 December 1951) is a German sailor. He competed for East Germany at the 1976 Summer Olympics and the 1980 Summer Olympics.
