= Miguel Noguer =

Spanish sailor

Medal record

Men's sailing

Representing Spain

Olympic Games
Gold medal – first place	1980 Moscow	Flying Dutchman

Miguel Noguer Castellvi (born 31 December 1956) is a Spanish sailor and Olympic champion. He competed at the 1980 Summer Olympics in Moscow and won a gold medal in the Flying Dutchman class, together with Alejandro Abascal.
