= Stephen Bourdow =

American sailor (born 1966)

Personal information
- Born: January 2, 1966 (age 60) Saginaw, Michigan, U.S.

Sport
- Club: Austin Yacht Club
Medal record
Men's sailing
Representing the United States
Olympic Games
Silver medal – second place	1992 Barcelona	Flying Dutchman

Stephen Norris Bourdow (born January 2, 1966) is an American former competitive sailor who won a silver medal at the 1992 Olympic Games in Barcelona. He was born in Saginaw, Michigan.

== Career ==
At the 1992 Summer Olympics, Bourdow finished in 2nd place in the Flying Dutchman along with his partner Paul Foerster.
