= Iain MacDonald-Smith =

British sailor

Medal record

Men's sailing

Representing United Kingdom

Olympic Games
Gold medal – first place	1968 Mexico City	Flying Dutchman

Iain Somerled Macdonald-Smith MBE, (born 3 July 1945 in Oxford, Oxfordshire) is a British sailor and Olympic champion. He competed at the 1968 Summer Olympics in Mexico City and won a gold medal in the Flying Dutchman class, together with Rodney Pattisson.

He was educated at Marlborough College and Selwyn College, Cambridge, before becoming a solicitor.
