= Thierry Berger =

French sailor

Personal information
- Nationality: French
- Born: 12 May 1962 (age 62); Dijon, France

Sport
- Sport: Sailing

Thierry Berger (born 12 May 1962) is a French sailor. He competed in the Flying Dutchman event at the 1992 Summer Olympics.
