= Laurent Couraire-Delage =

French sailor

Personal information
- Nationality: French
- Born: 24 June 1958 (age 66); Paris, France

Sport
- Sport: Sailing

Laurent Couraire-Delage (born 24 June 1958) is a French sailor. He competed at the 1984 Summer Olympics and the 1988 Summer Olympics.
