= Sergey Borodinov =

Soviet sailor

Personal information
- Nationality: Soviet
- Born: 9 September 1958 (age 66)

Sport
- Sport: Sailing

Sergey Borodinov (born 9 September 1958) is a Soviet sailor. He competed in the Flying Dutchman event at the 1988 Summer Olympics.
