= Rolf Mulka =

German sailor

Medal record

Men's sailing

Representing Germany

Olympic Games
Bronze medal – third place	1960 Rome	Flying Dutchman

Rolf Theodor Heinz Mulka (23 November 1927 – 14 July 2012) was a German sailor. He won the Olympic Bronze Medal Flying Dutchman in 1960 Rome along with Ingo von Bredow.

Mulka was the son of Robert Mulka who at the Auschwitz concentration camp, was adjutant to the camp commandant, SS-Obersturmbannführer Rudolf Höss.
