= Karl Geiger (sailor) =

Austrian sailor (born 1941)

Personal information
- Nationality: Austrian
- Born: 6 March 1941 (age 84)

Sport
- Sport: Sailing

Karl Geiger (born 6 March 1941) is an Austrian sailor. He competed at the 1964 Summer Olympics and the 1968 Summer Olympics.
