= Sailing at the 1968 Summer Olympics =

Sailing at the Games of the XIX Olympiad
- Venues: Club de Yates de Acapulco
- Dates: First race: 14 October 1968; Last race: 21 October 1968
- Competitors: 251 from 41 nations
- Boats: 123

Sailing/Yachting is an Olympic sport starting from the Games of the 1st Olympiad (1896 Olympics) in Athens, Greece. With the exception of 1904 and the canceled 1916 Summer Olympics, sailing has always been included on the Olympic schedule. The Sailing program of 1968 consisted of a total of five sailing classes (disciplines). For each class seven races were scheduled from 14 October 1968 to 21 October 1968 off the coast of Acapulco in the Bay of Acapulco. The sailing was done on the triangular type Olympic courses.

== Venue ==
Acapulco Bay is located on the Pacific coast in the state of Guerrero, 250 miles from Mexico City. The facilities at Club de Yates were improved and modified. 20,000 square metres of new docks provided with potable water, electricity and telephones were created. The buoys bearing colored flags delineated the three course areas.

Technical control was assured by a staff of measurers for gauging all yachts before racing.

The Olympic Village, located in the Caleta Hotel, provided accommodation for 503 competitors, trainers, team managers from 40 countries.

== Competition ==
=== Overview ===
Continents	Countries	Classes	Boats	Male	Female
5	41	5	123	251	0

=== Continents ===
- Asia
- Oceania
- Europe
- Americas

=== Countries ===
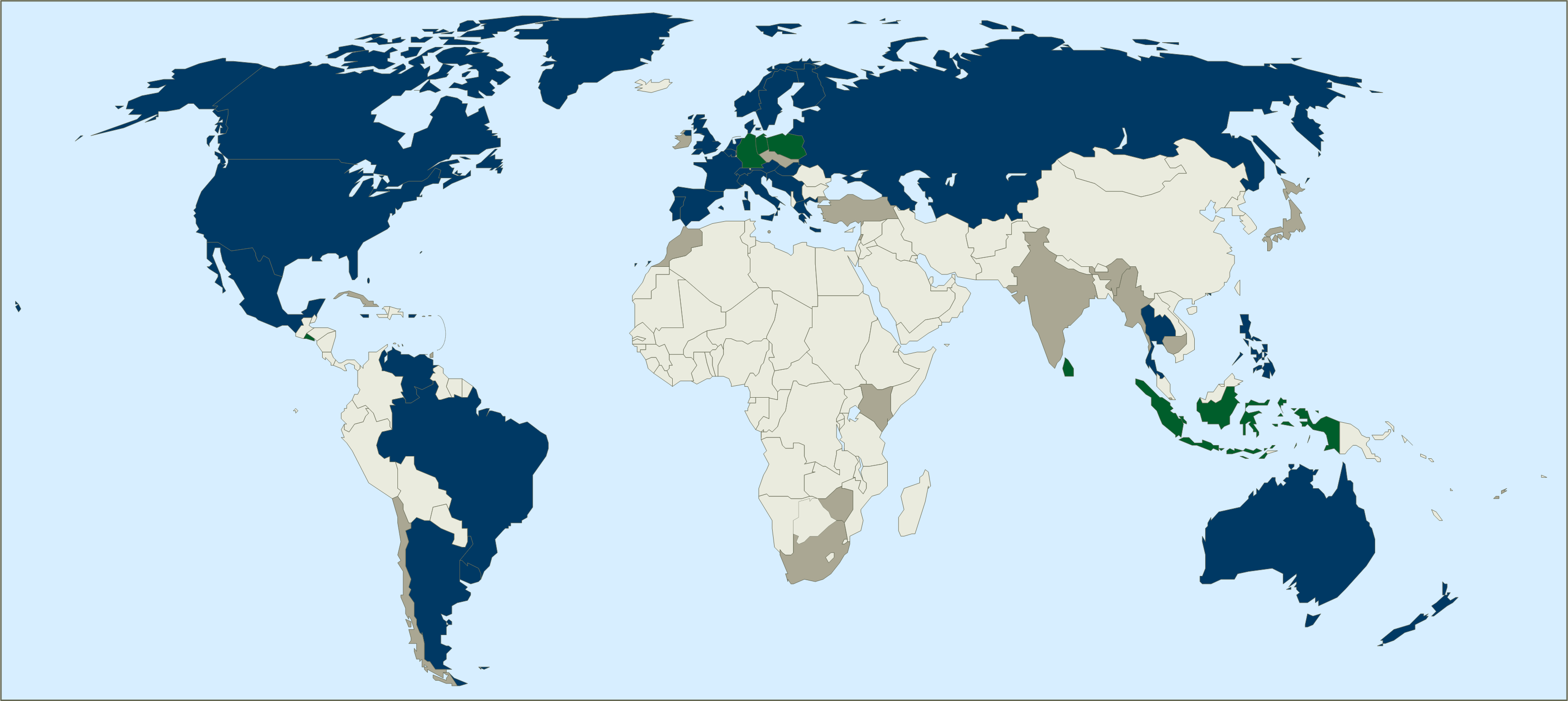
Countries that participated in the Sailing event of the 1968 Olympic Games. Blue: Water Gray: Never participated in OG Dark Gray: Participated in earlier OG Green: Country participated for the first time Dark Blue: Country participated also on previous games Red: Country boycotted the sailing event of the OG

Argentina	Australia	Austria
Bahamas	Belgium	Bermuda
Brazil	Canada	Ceylon
Denmark	El Salvador	Spain
Finland	France	West Germany
Great Britain	East Germany	Greece
Hong Kong	Hungary	Indonesia
Virgin Islands	Italy	Jamaica
Mexico	Netherlands	Norway
New Zealand	Philippines	Poland
Portugal	Puerto Rico	Switzerland
Sweden	Thailand	Soviet Union
Uruguay	United States	Venezuela
Yugoslavia

=== Classes (equipment) ===
Class	Type	Event	Sailors	Trapeze	Mainsail	Jib/Genoa	Spinnaker	First OG	Olympics so far
Finn	Dinghy		1	0	+	–	–	1952	5
Flying Dutchman	Dinghy		2	1	+	+	+	1960	3
Star	Keelboat		2	0	+	+	–	1932	8
Dragon	Keelboat		3	0	+	+	+	1948	6
5.5 Metre	Keelboat		3	0	+	+	+	1952	5

= Male, = Female, = Open

1968 Olympic Classes designs

== Medal summary ==
Event	Gold	Silver	Bronze
1968: Finn	Soviet Union (URS); Valentin Mankin	Austria (AUT); Hubert Raudaschl	Italy (ITA); Fabio Albarelli
1968: Flying Dutchman	Great Britain (GBR); Rodney Pattisson; Iain MacDonald-Smith	West Germany (FRG); Ulli Libor; Peter Naumann	Brazil (BRA); Reinaldo Conrad; Burkhard Cordes
1968: Star	United States (USA); Lowell North; Peter Barrett	Norway (NOR); Peder Lunde Jr. Per Wiken	Italy (ITA); Franco Cavallo; Camillo Gargano
1968: Dragon	United States (USA); George Friedrichs; Barton Jahncke; Gerald Schreck	Denmark (DEN); Aage Birch; Paul Lindemark Jørgensen; Niels Markussen	East Germany (GDR); Paul Borowski; Karl-Heinz Thun; Konrad Weichert
1968: 5.5 Metre	Sweden (SWE); Ulf Sundelin; Jörgen Sundelin; Peter Sundelin	Switzerland (SUI); Louis Noverraz; Bernhard Dunand; Marcel Stern	Great Britain (GBR); Robin Aisher; Paul Anderson; Adrian Jardine

== Medal table ==
Rank	Nation	Gold	Silver	Bronze	Total
1	United States	2	0	0	2
2	Great Britain	1	0	1	2
3	Soviet Union	1	0	0	1
3	Sweden	1	0	0	1
5	Austria	0	1	0	1
5	Denmark	0	1	0	1
5	Norway	0	1	0	1
5	Switzerland	0	1	0	1
5	West Germany	0	1	0	1
10	Italy	0	0	2	2
11	Brazil	0	0	1	1
11	East Germany	0	0	1	1
Totals (12 entries)		5	5	5	15

== Remarks ==
=== Sailing ===
- This Olympic sailing event was gender independent, but turned out to be a Men-only event. This was one of the triggers to create gender specific events. This however had to wait until 1988.
- Paul Elvstrøm (DEN) was trying to win his fifth gold medal. This time in the Star. He came close. 4th.
- Rodney Pattison (GBR) won his first Olympic medal (Gold) in his boat Supercalifragilisticexpialidocious. It is difficult to appoint Olympic records to sailing, but the score of this Flying Dutchman team would hold probably the record of best Olympic score: ~~DSQ~~, 1, 1, 1, 1, 1, 2!
- In each of the five classes there was a major difference in points between the gold and the silver medalists.

=== Sailors ===
During the Sailing regattas at the 1968 Summer Olympics among others the following persons were competing in the various classes:

- Royalties
  - Norway, King of Norway, HRH Crown Prince Harald in the 5.5 Metre
- Sport managers
  - Belgium, Future president International Olympic Committee, Jacques Rogge in the Finn
  - Finland, Future president International Sailing Federation, Peter Tallberg in the Star
  - Canada, Future president International Sailing Federation, Paul Henderson in the Finn
  - Greece. Future holder of the Silver Olympic Order, George Andreadis in the Flying Dutchman
Sailors at the 1968 Olympic Games
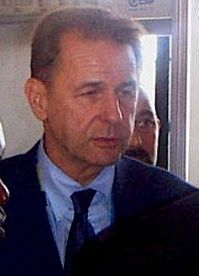
In Finn:
Jacques Rogge

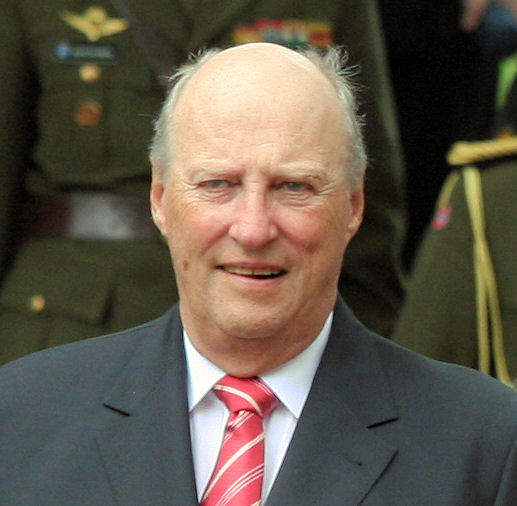
In 5.5 Metre:
Harald V of Norway
