= André Nicolet =

Swiss sailor

Personal information
- Nationality: Swiss
- Born: 4 March 1950
- Died: 8 February 2024 (aged 73)

Sport
- Sport: Sailing

André Nicolet (4 March 1950 – 8 February 2024) was a Swiss sailor. He competed in the Flying Dutchman event at the 1976 Summer Olympics.
