= Herbert Hüttner =

German sailor

Personal information
- Nationality: German
- Born: 21 July 1942 (age 83); Schwerin, Germany

Sport
- Sport: Sailing

Herbert Hüttner (born 21 July 1942) is a German sailor. He competed in the Flying Dutchman event at the 1972 Summer Olympics.
