= James Cook (sailor) =

Australian sailor

Personal information
- Nationality: Australian
- Born: 18 August 1952 (age 72)
- Height: 185 cm (6 ft 1 in)
- Weight: 92 kg (203 lb)

Sport
- Country: Australia
- Sport: Sailing

James Cook (born 18 August 1952) is an Australian sailor. He competed in the Flying Dutchman event at the 1984 Summer Olympics.
