= Roberto Gazzei =

Italian sailor

Personal information
- Nationality: Italian
- Born: 5 February 1957 (age 69) Piombino, Italy

Sport
- Sport: Sailing

Roberto Gazzei (born 5 February 1957) is an Italian former sailor. He competed in the Flying Dutchman event at the 1980 Summer Olympics.
