= Ian Palmer (sailor) =

Australian sailor (born 1941)

Personal information
- Nationality: Australian
- Born: 4 September 1941 (age 83); Nedlands, Western Australia

Sport
- Sport: Sailing

Ian Palmer (born 4 September 1941) is an Australian sailor. He competed in the Flying Dutchman event at the 1960 Summer Olympics.
