= James Ramus =

British sailor

Personal information
- Nationality: British
- Born: 14 April 1935 (age 89); Beckley, England

Sport
- Sport: Sailing

James Ramus (born 14 April 1935) is a British sailor. He competed at the 1960 Summer Olympics and the 1968 Summer Olympics.
