= Werner Fischer (sailor) =

Austrian sailor

Personal information
- Nationality: Austrian
- Born: 8 November 1940; Bregenz, Tyrol-Vorarlberg, Germany
- Died: 6 June 2011 (aged 70); Bregenz, Austria

Sport
- Sport: Sailing

Werner Fischer (8 November 1940 — 6 June 2011) was an Austrian sailor. He competed at the 1964 Summer Olympics and the 1968 Summer Olympics.
