= Marco Savelli =

Italian sailor

Personal information
- Nationality: Italian
- Born: 6 August 1949 (age 77) Poggibonsi, Italy

Sport
- Sport: Sailing

Marco Savelli (born 6 August 1949) is an Italian former sailor. He competed in the Flying Dutchman event at the 1980 Summer Olympics.
