= Thierry Poirey =

French sailor

Personal information
- Nationality: francais de france
- Born: 5 November 1956 (age 68)

Sport
- Sport: Sailing

Thierry Poirey (born 5 November 1956) is a French sailor. He competed in the Flying Dutchman event at the 1984 Summer Olympics. In particular, he coached the French Paralympic sailing team to a gold medal. He took part in the America's Cup with the French team.
