= Hans-Jürgen Cochius =

German sailor

Personal information
- Nationality: German
- Born: 3 August 1941; Berlin, Germany
- Died: 4 August 2024 (aged 83); Bad Saarow OT Petersdorf

Sport
- Sport: Sailing

Hans-Jürgen Cochius (3 August 1941 – 4 August 2024) was a German sailor. He competed in the Flying Dutchman event at the 1968 Summer Olympics.
