= Marco Sartori =

Italian sailor

Marco Sartori (14 December 1938 – 7 June 2015) was an Italian sailor who competed in the 1964 Summer Olympics.
