= Jörg Diesch =

German sailor (born 1951)

Medal record

Men's sailing

Representing West Germany

Olympic Games
Gold medal – first place	1976 Montreal	Flying Dutchman

World Championships
Gold medal – first place	1986	Flying Dutchman
Silver medal – second place	1977	Flying Dutchman
Silver medal – second place	1978	Flying Dutchman
Silver medal – second place	1981	Flying Dutchman
Silver medal – second place	1983	Flying Dutchman
Silver medal – second place	1985	Flying Dutchman
Bronze medal – third place	1975	Flying Dutchman
Bronze medal – third place	1980	Flying Dutchman

Jörg Diesch (born 29 September 1951 in Friedrichshafen) is a German sailor, Olympic champion and world champion. He won a gold medal in the Flying Dutchman Class with Eckart Diesch at the 1976 Summer Olympics in Montreal. He received a gold medal at the 1986 world championships, and received five silver medals and two bronze medals between 1975 and 1985, all with Eckart Diesch.
