= David Hunt (sailor) =

British sailor

Medal record

Sailing

Representing the United Kingdom

Olympic Games
Silver medal – second place	1972 Munich	Tempest

David Charles Gower Hunt (born 22 May 1934 in Woolwich, London) is an English sailor. He won a silver medal in the Tempest class with Alan Warren at the 1972 Summer Olympics.
