= Evert Bastet =

Canadian sailor (born 1950)

Personal information
- Born: May 30, 1950 (age 76) Maracaibo, Venezuela

Sailing career
- Sport: Sailing
Medal record
Men's sailing
Representing Canada
Olympic Games
Silver medal – second place	1984 Los Angeles	Flying Dutchman

Evert Bastet (born May 30, 1950, in Maracaibo, Venezuela) is a Canadian sailor. He won a silver medal in the Flying Dutchman Class at the 1984 Summer Olympics with Terry McLaughlin. He also finished fourth within the same category at the 1976 Summer Olympics. He lives in Hudson, Québec.

He was from Mississauga, Ontario, as of 1976.
