= Alejandro Abascal =

Spanish sailor (born 1952)

Personal information
- Full name: Alejandro Tomas Abascal García
- Born: 15 July 1952 (age 73) Santander, Cantabria, Spain
- Height: 181 cm (5 ft 11 in)
- Weight: 82 kg (181 lb)

Sailing career
- Sport: Sailing
Medal record
Men's sailing
Representing Spain
Olympic Games
| Gold medal – first place | 1980 Moscow | Flying Dutchman |

Alejandro Tomas Abascal García (Note: In this Spanish name, the first or paternal surname is Abascal and the second or maternal family name is García.) (born 15 July 1952) is a Spanish sailor and Olympic champion. He competed at the 1980 Summer Olympics in Moscow and won a gold medal in the Flying Dutchman class, together with Miguel Noguer. This was Spain's third Olympic Gold Summer Medal, and their first since 1928.

Previously, he was Vaurien World Championship in 1974 and Spanish Junior national champion in Snipe in 1971.
