= Albert Batzill =

German sailor (born 1952)

Personal information
- Nationality: German
- Born: 14 December 1952 (age 72); Friedrichshafen
- Height: 176 cm (5 ft 9 in)
- Weight: 65 kg (143 lb)

Sailing career
- Class: Flying Dutchman

Albert Batzill (born 14 December 1952) is a German sailor. He competed in the Flying Dutchman class at the 1988 Summer Olympics and the 1992 Summer Olympics. Batzill is also a four-time world champion in this class.
