= Sailing at the Pan American Games =

- No. of events: 11 (men: 3; women: 3; mixed: 5)

Sailing has been a sport of the Pan American Games since the inaugural 1951 Pan American Games, being contested in every edition, except for the 1955 edition.

== Medal table ==
Updated after the 2023 Pan American Games.

Rank	Nation	Gold	Silver	Bronze	Total
1	Brazil	42	27	22	91
2	United States	39	34	25	98
3	Argentina	17	16	27	60
4	Canada	12	21	21	54
5	Cuba	4	3	1	8
6	Guatemala	4	0	3	7
6	Puerto Rico	4	0	3	7
8	Mexico	3	8	7	18
9	Chile	3	5	9	17
10	Peru	2	2	2	6
11	Venezuela	2	1	0	3
12	Bahamas	2	0	0	2
13	Ecuador	1	1	0	2
14	Uruguay	0	6	5	11
15	Bermuda	0	3	2	5
16	Aruba	0	2	1	3
17	Virgin Islands	0	2	0	2
18	Antigua and Barbuda	0	1	0	1
18	Colombia	0	1	0	1
20	Dominican Republic	0	0	2	2
21	British West Indies	0	0	1	1
21	Independent Athletes Team	0	0	1	1
Totals (22 entries)		135	133	132	400

Notes

At the 1959 edition, Barton Kirkconell from Jamaica and Rawle Barrow from Trinidad and Tobago earned, together, a bronze medal at the Flyting Dutchman class. The medal is credited to the West Indies Federation.

== See also ==
- List of Flying Dutchman (dinghy) championships § Pan American Games (1959 – 1975)
