= Sailing at the 1964 Summer Olympics =

Sailing at the Games of the XVIII Olympiad
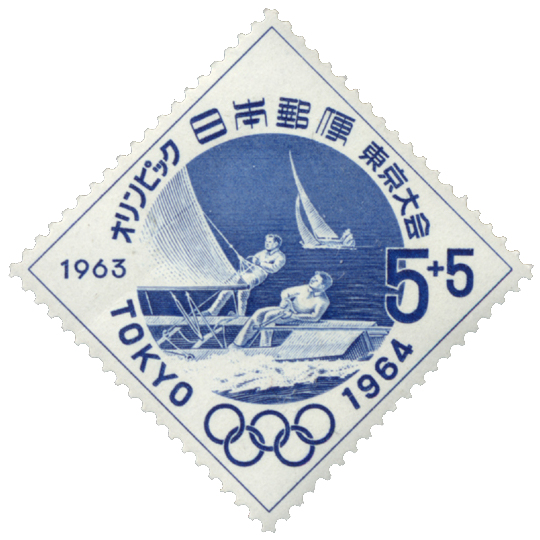
- Sailing at the 1964 Olympics on a stamp of Japan
- Venues: Sagami Bay
- Dates: First race: 12 October 1964; Last race: 23 October 1964
- Competitors: 233 from 40 nations
- Boats: 119

Sailing/Yachting is an Olympic sport starting from the Games of the 1st Olympiad (1896 Olympics in Athens Greece. With the exception of 1904 and the canceled 1916 Summer Olympics, sailing has always been included on the Olympic schedule. The Sailing program of 1964 consisted of a total of five sailing classes (disciplines). For each class, seven races were scheduled; these took place from 12 to 23 October 1964 off the coast of Enoshima in Sagami Bay. The sailing was done on the triangular type Olympic courses.

== Venue ==
Shonan Port (Enoshima Yacht Harbour)
- Interactive map of Shonan Port (Enoshima Yacht Harbour)
- Coordinates: 35°18′5.78″N 139°29′8.68″E

At the IOC session in 1959, Japan stated that yachting would take place in the port of Yokohama, as was the plan for 1940. Later, when it became clear that Yokohama was not suitable for Olympic-level sailing, it was decided that yachting events would be held off the coast of Enoshima Island in Kanagawa Prefecture on the bay of Sagami. To meet the requirement at Enoshima it was decided to build a large scale harbour at Enoshima for the 1964 Olympics. The construction of a yacht harbor on the island was started in May 1961 and finished in July 1964. The total construction cost was $6,027,778 USD.

A total of three race areas were created in Sagami bay. The Japanese Sea Self-Defense Forces vessels supported the race management and specially the placements of the marks.

== Competition ==
=== Overview ===
Continents	Countries	Classes	Boats	Male	Female
5	40	5	119	232	1

=== Continents ===
- Africa
- Asia
- Oceania
- Europe
- Americas

=== Countries ===
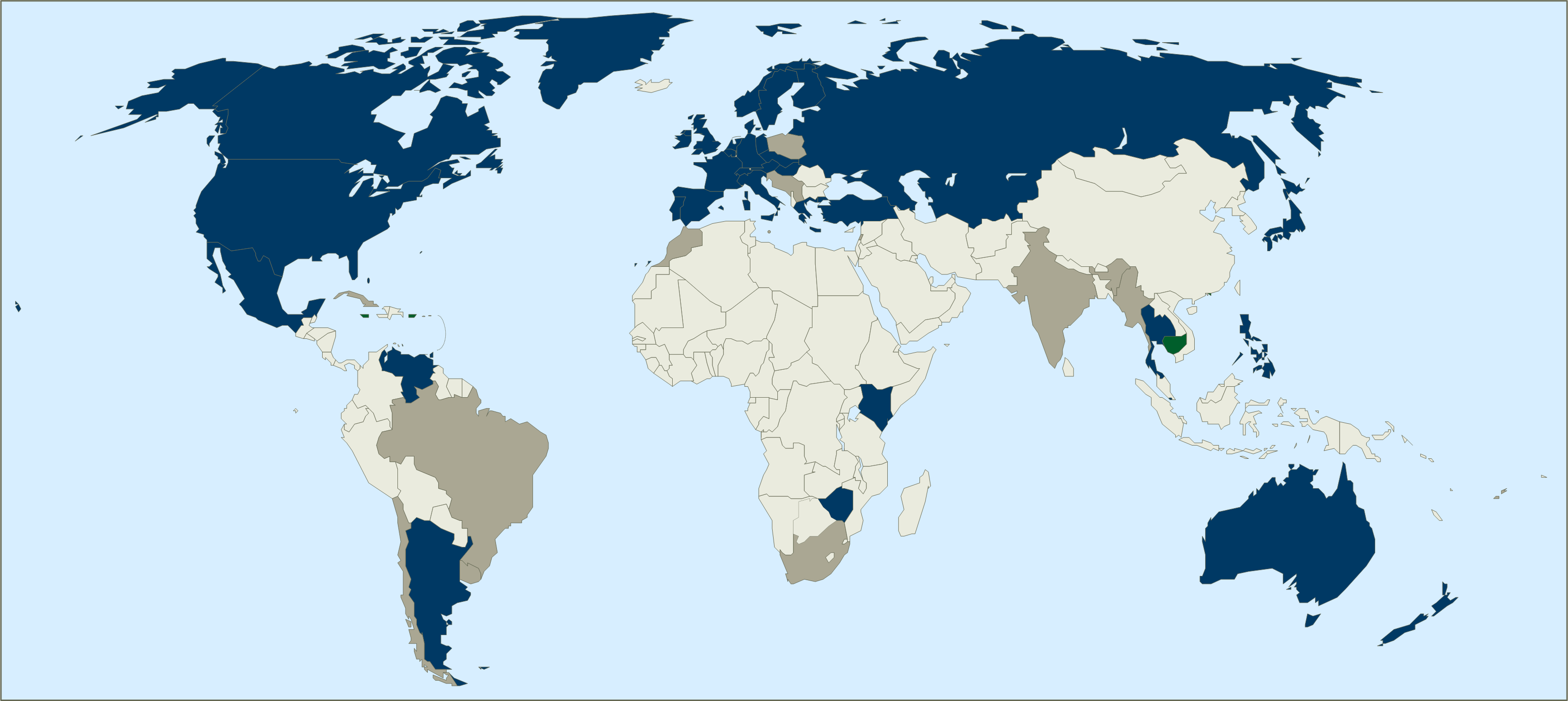
Countries that participated in the Sailing event of the 1964 Olympic Games. Blue: Water Gray: Never participated in OG Dark Gray: Participated in earlier OG Green: Country participated for the first time Dark Blue: Country participated also on previous games Red: Country boycotted the sailing event of the OG

Argentina	Australia	Austria
Bahamas	Belgium	Bermuda
Brazil	Cambodia	Canada
Denmark	Spain	United Team of Germany
Finland	France	Great Britain
Greece	Hong Kong	Hungary
Ireland	Italy	Jamaica
Japan	Kenya	Mexico
Netherlands	Norway	New Zealand
Philippines	Portugal	Puerto Rico
Rhodesia	Switzerland	Sweden
Czechoslovakia	Thailand	Trinidad and Tobago
Turkey	Soviet Union	United States
Venezuela

=== Classes (equipment) ===
Class	Type	Event	Sailors	Trapeze	Mainsail	Jib/Genoa	Spinnaker	First OG	Olympics so far
Finn	Dinghy		1	0	+	–	–	1952	4
Flying Dutchman	Dinghy		2	1	+	+	+	1960	2
Star	Keelboat		2	0	+	+	–	1932	7
Dragon	Keelboat		3	0	+	+	+	1948	5
5.5 Metre	Keelboat		3	0	+	+	+	1952	4

= Male, = Female, = Open

1964 Olympic Classes designs

== Medal summary ==
Event	Gold	Silver	Bronze
1964: Finn	Germany (EUA); Wilhelm Kuhweide	United States (USA); Peter Barrett	Denmark (DEN); Henning Wind
1964: Flying Dutchman	New Zealand (NZL); Helmer Pedersen; Earle Wells	Great Britain (GBR); Keith Musto; Tony Morgan	United States (USA); Harry Melges; William Bentsen
1964: Star	Bahamas (BAH); Durward Knowles; Cecil Cooke	United States (USA); Richard Stearns; Lynn Williams	Sweden (SWE); Pelle Pettersson; Holger Sundström
1964: Dragon	Denmark (DEN); Ole Berntsen; Christian von Bülow; Ole Poulsen	Germany (EUA); Peter Ahrendt; Wilfried Lorenz; Ulrich Mense	United States (USA); Lowell North; Richard Deaver; Charles Rogers
1964: 5.5 Metre	Australia (AUS); William Northam; Peter O'Donnell; James Sargeant	Sweden (SWE); Lars Thörn; Arne Karlsson; Sture Stork	United States (USA); John J. McNamara; Joseph Batchelder; Francis Scully

== Medal table ==
Rank	Nation	Gold	Silver	Bronze	Total
1	United Team of Germany	1	1	0	2
2	Denmark	1	0	1	2
3	Australia	1	0	0	1
3	Bahamas	1	0	0	1
3	New Zealand	1	0	0	1
6	United States	0	2	3	5
7	Sweden	0	1	1	2
8	Great Britain	0	1	0	1
Totals (8 entries)		5	5	5	15

== Remarks ==
=== Sailing ===
- Stop-watches, for attachment to the knee, for each participant in the yacht races were distributed.
- A new Olympic trophy was introduced at the 1964 Summer Games (The Tokyo Trophy). It was the desire that this Trophy be awarded to those who display the highest qualities of sportsmanship. During the Tokyo Games, this new Trophy was awarded to the Flying Dutchman team of Lars Käll and Stig Käll (SWE) who, according to the official IOC site:
  set an outstanding example of sportsmanship when they gave up their race to save the life of a fellow competitor. ( Ian Charles Winter (AUS))
- This Olympic sailing regatta had a remarkable set of Olympic reserves like: Rickard Sarby (SWE), Jan Linge (NOR), Valentin Mankin (URS) and Paul Elvstrøm (DEN).

=== Sailors ===
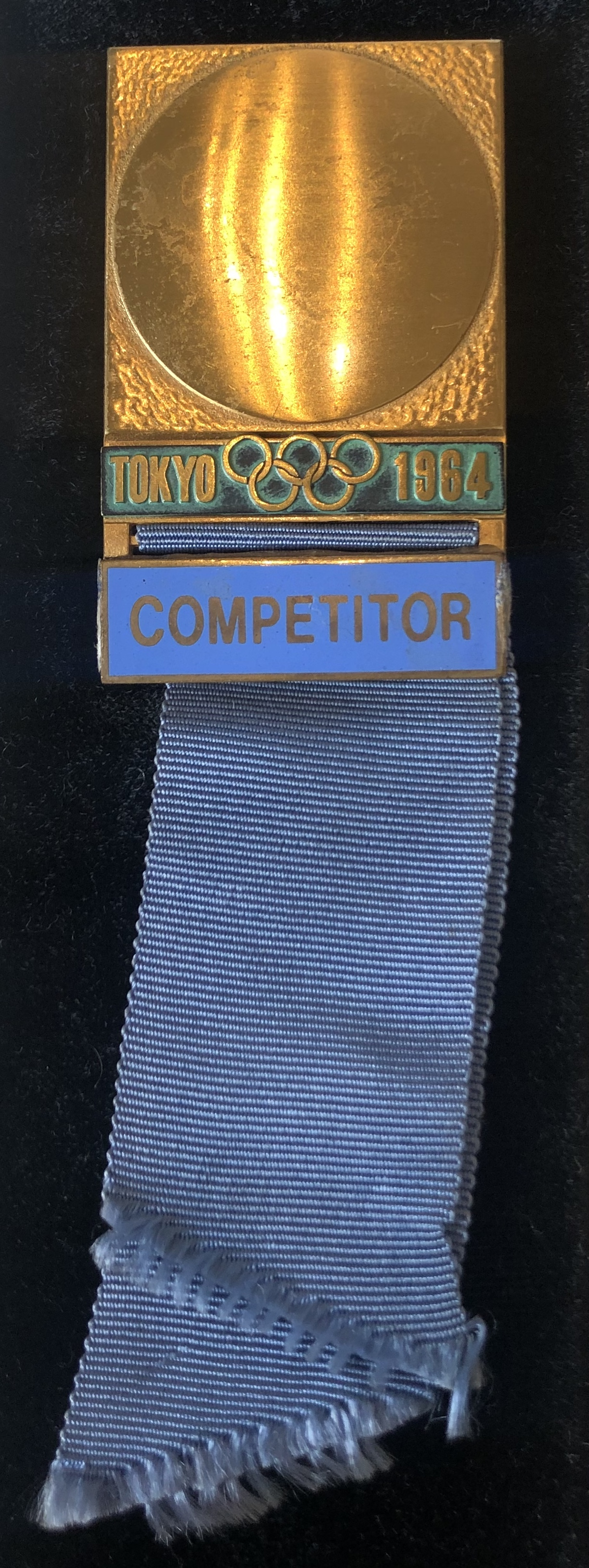
Competitor medal awarded to Irish yachtsman Eddie Kelliher at the games

During the sailing regattas at the 1964 Summer Olympics among others the following persons were competing in the various classes:

- Royalties
  - Prince Bhanubanda Bira (THA), Prince of Thailand, in the Dragon
  - Crown prince Harald (NOR), future King of Norway, in the 5.5 Metre
- In the Finn
  - Hubert Raudaschl (AUT), Record holder of competing in the largest number of Olympic games and sailmaker
- In the Flying Dutchman
  - Keith Musto (GBR), Founder of Musto (company)
  - Buddy Melges (USA), One of the most famous sailors ever
  - Paul Henderson (CAN), Future ISAF president
- In the Star
  - Pelle Pettersson (SWE), Yacht designer and America's Cup skipper
- In the Dragon
  - Lowell North (USA), Founder of North Sails
- In the 5.5 Metre
  - Bill Northam (AUS), Chairman of Johnson & Johnson and Slazenger
  - John J. McNamara (author) (USA), Author and Banker
  - Robert Symonette (BAH), Future Speaker of the Bahamas "House of the Assembly"
Sailors at the 1964 Olympic Games
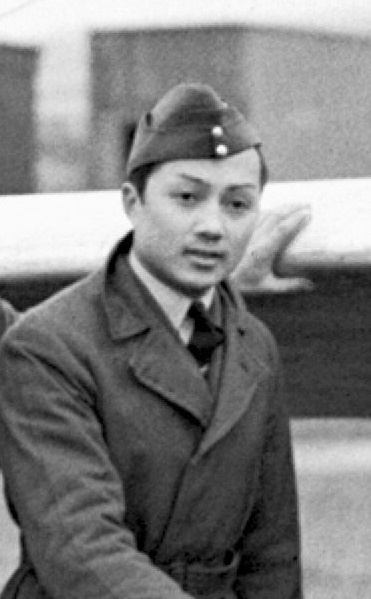
In Dragon:
Prinz Bhanubanda Bira

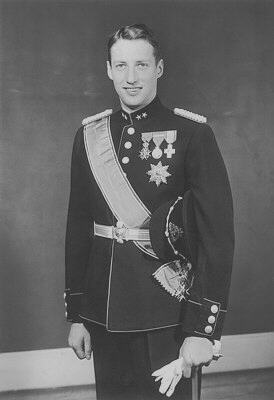
In 5.5 Metre:
Harald V of Norway

In Flying Dutchman: Keith Musto (Picture 2008)
