= Sailing at the 1964 Summer Olympics – Dragon =

Sailing at the Olympics

Dragon at the Games of the XVIII Olympiad
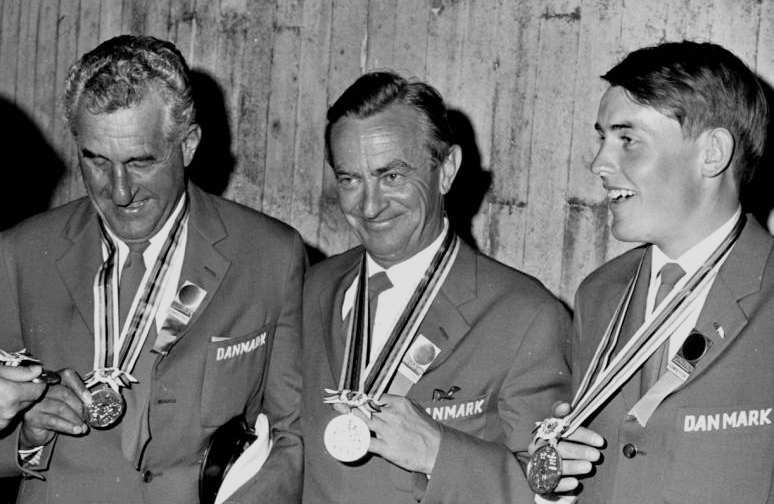
- The winners: Ole Berntsen, Christian von Bülow, Ole Poulsen
- Venue: Enoshima
- Competitors: 70 from 23 nations
- Teams: 23

Medalists
1st place, gold medalist(s)		Ole Berntsen; Christian von Bulow; Ole Poulsen	Denmark
2nd place, silver medalist(s)		Peter Ahrendt; Ulrich Mense; Wilfried Lorenz	United Team of Germany
3rd place, bronze medalist(s)		Lowell North; Charles Rogers; Richard Deaver	United States

The Dragon was a sailing event on the Sailing at the 1964 Summer Olympics program in Enoshima. Seven races were scheduled. 70 sailors, on 23 boats, from 23 nations competed.

== Results ==
Rank	Helmsman (Country)	Crew	Yachtname	Sail No.	Race I		Race II		Race III		Race IV		Race V		Race VI		Race VII		Total Points	Total -1
Rank	Helmsman (Country)	Crew	Yachtname	Sail No.	Rank	Points	Rank	Points	Rank	Points	Rank	Points	Rank	Points	Rank	Points	Rank	Points	Total Points	Total -1
1st place, gold medalist(s)	Ole Berntsen (DEN)	Christian von Bulow; Ole Poulsen	White Lady	D 166	1	1463	~~16~~	~~259~~	4	861	10	463	3	986	1	1463	7	618	6113	5854
2nd place, silver medalist(s)	Peter Ahrendt (EUA)	Wilfried Lorenz; Ulrich Mense	Mutafo	GO; 37	8	560	~~10~~	~~463~~	7	618	1	1463	2	1162	4	861	2	1162	6289	5826
3rd place, bronze medalist(s)	Lowell North (USA)	Richard Deaver; Charles Rogers	Aphrodite	US; 219	3	986	5	764	1	1463	3	986	~~8~~	~~560~~	5	764	8	560	6083	5523
4	Edwin Parry (GBR)	Jeremy Harris; Peter Reade	Andromeda	K 381	5	764	1	1463	9	508	2	1162	9	508	6	685	~~18~~	~~207~~	5297	5090
5	Kirk Cooper (BER)	Penny Simmons; Conrad Soares	Oleander XII	KB; 2	~~19~~	~~184~~	8	560	5	764	6	685	1	1463	2	1162	11	421	5239	5055
6	Sergio Sorrentino (ITA)	Sergio Furlan; Annibale Pelaschiar	Argeste	I 21	2	1162	11	421	3	986	13	349	6	685	7	618	5	764	4985	4636
7	Godfrey Kelly (BAH)	Basil Kelly; Robert Eardley	Guanahani	BA; 1	~~16~~	~~259~~	13	349	13	349	4	861	5	764	9	508	1	1463	4553	4294
8	Odysseus Eskitzoglou (GRE)	Georgios Zaimis; Thimistokles Magoulas	Proteus II	GR; 18	~~13~~	~~349~~	2	1162	10	463	9	508	12	384	3	986	6	685	4537	4188
9	Yury Shavrin (URS)	Valery Nikulin; Lev Alekseyev	Olen	SR; 1	6	685	9	508	2	1162	8	560	7	618	10	463	~~12~~	~~384~~	4380	3996
10	Jorge Salas Chávez (ARG)	Jorge del Río Sálas; Rodolfo Rivademar	Tango	A 34	7	618	3	986	~~18~~	~~207~~	12	384	15	287	11	421	3	986	3889	3682
11	Ed Botterell (CAN)	Lynn Watters; John MacBrien	Serendipity	KC; 101	4	861	4	861	11	421	7	618	13	349	~~14~~	~~317~~	13	349	3776	3459
12	Graham Drane (AUS)	Ian Quartermain; John Coon	Cambria	KA; 90	9	508	12	384	6	685	~~DNF~~	~~101~~	11	421	12	384	4	861	3344	3243
13	Wim van Duyl (NED)	Henny Scholtz; Race: 1 - 2: Jan Jongkind; Race 3 - 7: Dick Wayboer	Barco Deloro	H 191	12	384	21	141	8	560	5	764	4	861	~~DNF~~	~~101~~	9	508	3319	3218
14	Bo Kaiser (SWE)	Arne Settergren; Styrbjörn Holm	Kuling	S 210	14	317	6	685	~~16~~	~~259~~	18	207	10	463	8	560	14	317	2808	2601
15	Morits Skaugen (NOR)	Knut Bengtson; Egil Normann Ly	Monica	N 236	11	421	14	317	12	384	11	421	14	317	18	207	~~19~~	~~184~~	2251	2067
16	Joaquim Basto (POR)	Eduardo de Queiroz; Carlos Ferreira	Grifo IV	P 20	10	463	19	184	14	317	16	259	~~DNF~~	~~101~~	13	349	17	232	1905	1804
17	Saburo Tanamachi (JPN)	Tadashi Funaoka; Teruyuki Horie	Miss Nippon V	J 15	17	232	~~18~~	~~207~~	17	232	14	317	16	259	16	259	10	463	1969	1762
18	Mauricio de la Lama (MEX)	Eduardo Prieto; Juan Frias	Acipactli	MX; 1	~~DNF~~	~~101~~	7	618	15	287	17	232	DNF	101	17	232	20	162	1733	1632
19	John Park (HKG)	William Turnbull; Paul Cooper	Phoenix	KH; 1	15	287	17	232	19	184	19	184	~~DNF~~	~~101~~	15	287	15	287	1562	1461
20	Eddie Kelliher (IRL)	Rob D'Alton; Harry Maguire	Akatonbo	IR; 2	18	207	20	162	~~DNF~~	~~101~~	15	287	17	232	19	184	16	259	1432	1331
21	Fausto Preysler (PHI)	Jesus Maria Villarreal; Feliciano Juntareal	Kalayaan	PH; 1	21	141	15	287	~~DNF~~	~~101~~	21	141	19	184	20	162	21	141	1157	1056
22	Prinz Bira Bhanubanda (THA)	Arunee Bhanubandh; Prateep Areerob	Linglom	TH; 4	20	162	~~22~~	~~120~~	20	162	22	120	20	162	22	120	22	120	966	846
23	Barton Kirkconnell (JAM)	Earl Taylor; Steven Henriques	Miss Nippon IV	KJ; 4	22	120	23	101	DNF	101	20	162	18	207	21	141	~~DSQ~~	~~0~~	832	832

DNF = Did not finish, DNS= Did not start, DSQ = Disqualified
= Male, = Female

=== Daily standings ===
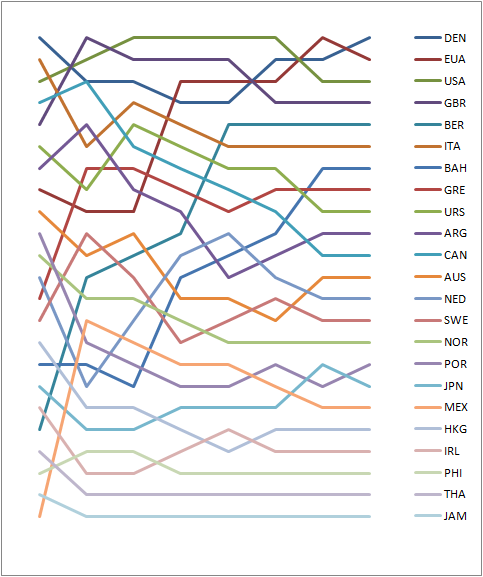
Graph showing the daily standings in the Dragon during the 1964 Summer Olympics

== Conditions at Enoshima ==
Of the total of three race areas were needed during the Olympics in Enoshima. Each of the classes was using the same scoring system. The Easterly course area was used for the Dragon.

Date	Race	Weather	Wind direction	Wind speed (m/s)
12 October 1964	I	Cloudy	ENE	0.4
13 October 1964	II	Cloudy	NNE	5.5
14 October 1964	III	Cloudy	N	12
15 October 1964	IV	Fine	N	8
19 October 1964	V	Cloudy	N	4.5
20 October 1964	VI	Fine	NNE	12
21 October 1964	VII	Cloudy	S	11
