= Sailing at the 1964 Summer Olympics – Flying Dutchman =

Sailing at the Olympics

Flying Dutchman at the Games of the XVIII Olympiad
- Olympics 1964 Configuration
- Venue: Enoshima
- Competitors: 42 from 21 nations
- Teams: 21

Medalists
1st place, gold medalist(s)		Helmer Pedersen; Earle Wells	New Zealand
2nd place, silver medalist(s)		Keith Musto; Tony Morgan	Great Britain
3rd place, bronze medalist(s)		Buddy Melges; William Bentsen	United States

The Flying Dutchman was a sailing event on the Sailing at the 1964 Summer Olympics program in Enoshima. Seven races were scheduled. 42 sailors, on 21 boats, from 21 nations competed.

== Results ==
Rank	Helmsman (Country)	Crew	Yachtname	Sail No.	Race I		Race II		Race III		Race IV		Race V		Race VI		Race VII		Total Points	Total -1
Rank	Helmsman (Country)	Crew	Yachtname	Sail No.	Rank	Points	Rank	Points	Rank	Points	Rank	Points	Rank	Points	Rank	Points	Rank	Points	Total Points	Total -1
1st place, gold medalist(s)	Helmer Pedersen (NZL)	Earle Wells	Pandora	KZ; 22	16	219	~~DNF~~	~~101~~	1	1423	3	946	1	1423	1	1423	4	821	6356	6255
2nd place, silver medalist(s)	Keith Musto (GBR)	Tony Morgan.	Lady C	K 93	8	520	1	1423	2	1122	5	724	6	645	2	1122	~~11~~	~~382~~	5938	5556
3rd place, bronze medalist(s)	Buddy Melges (USA)	William Bentsen	Widgeon	US; 600	10	423	2	1122	~~DNF~~	~~101~~	2	1122	2	1122	3	946	10	423	5259	5158
4	Hans Fogh (DEN)	Ole Gunnar Petersen	Miss Denmark 1964	D 10	6	645	~~DNF~~	~~101~~	4	821	1	1423	5	724	13	309	7	578	4601	4500
5	Aleksandr Shelkovnikov (URS)	Viktor Pilchin	Almaz	SR; 1	7	578	13	309	~~DNF~~	~~101~~	4	821	10	423	4	821	1	1423	4476	4375
6	Ben Verhagen (NED)	Nick de Jong	Daisy	H 187	~~15~~	~~247~~	3	946	8	520	8	520	11	382	5	724	2	1122	4461	4214
7	Marcel-André Buffet (FRA)	Alain-François Lehoerff	Pigoule	F 50	2	1122	7	578	5	724	15	247	3	946	15	247	~~DNF~~	~~101~~	3965	3864
8	Karl Geiger (AUT)	Werner Fischer	Brigantia	OE; 100	14	277	~~DSQ~~	~~0~~	3	946	10	423	9	469	6	645	3	946	3706	3706
9	Einar Koefoed (NOR)	Hans Mehren	Lucky	N 15	4	821	~~11~~	~~382~~	7	578	9	469	7	578	7	578	6	645	4051	3669
10	Mario Capio (ITA)	Marco Sartori	Aldebaran	I 311	1	1423	5	724	~~DNF~~	~~101~~	12	344	12	344	8	520	13	309	3765	3664
11	Alan David Butler (RHO)	Anthony Crossley	Peri II	KR; 184	3	946	8	520	~~DNF~~	~~101~~	6	645	4	821	9	469	15	247	3749	3648
12	Paul Henderson (CAN)	Richard Lennox	Syndi	KC; 41	5	724	10	423	10	423	13	309	~~13~~	~~309~~	12	344	5	724	3256	2947
13	Eberhard Reschwamm (EUA)	Dietmar Gedde	Tantalus	GO; 92	~~17~~	~~193~~	9	469	6	645	11	382	8	520	10	423	12	344	2976	2783
14	John Dawe (AUS)	Ian Winter	Diablo	KA; 95	13	309	4	821	~~DNF~~	~~101~~	7	578	DNF	101	DNF	101	9	469	2480	2379
15	Yasutoshi Tagami (JPN)	Kendjiro Matsuda	Riccar	J 7	9	469	6	645	13	309	~~DNF~~	~~101~~	15	247	16	219	14	277	2267	2166
16	Joaquim Roderbourg (BRA)	Klaus Hendriksen	Vento Sul	BL; 24	12	344	12	344	9	469	14	277	~~17~~	~~193~~	17	193	8	520	2340	2147
17	Jean-Pierre Renevier (SUI)	Michel Buzzi	Pousse-Moi	Z 83	11	382	15	247	11	382	16	219	~~DNS~~	~~0~~	11	382	18	168	1780	1780
18	Lars Käll (SWE)	Stig Käll	Hayama	S 40	~~18~~	~~168~~	14	277	12	344	17	193	14	277	14	277	17	193	1729	1561
19	Rawle Barrow (TRI)	Cordell Barrow	Pas VII	KT; 4	19	144	16	219	DNF	101	~~DNS~~	~~0~~	16	219	18	168	16	219	1070	1070
20	Erdoğan Arsal (TUR)	Metin Akdurak	Firebird II	TK; 6	20	122	17	193	~~DNF~~	~~101~~	18	168	18	168	20	122	20	122	996	895
21	Alfonso Serrano (MEX)	Sergio Gonzalez Karg	Tlaloc	MX; 58	21	101	18	168	~~DNS~~	~~0~~	19	144	19	144	19	144	19	144	845	845

DNF = Did Not Finish, DNS= Did Not Start, DSQ = Disqualified
= Male, = Female

=== Daily standings ===
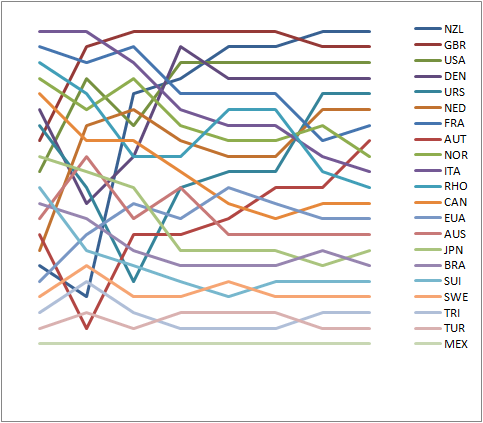
Graph showing the daily standings in the Flying Dutchman during the 1964 Summer Olympics

== Conditions at Enoshima ==
Of the total of three race areas were needed during the Olympics in Enoshima. Each of the classes was using the same scoring system. The Westerly course area was used for the Flying Dutchman.

Date	Race	Weather	Wind direction	Wind speed (m/s)
12 October 1964	I	Cloudy	E	3.3
13 October 1964	II	Cloudy	NE	3.8
14 October 1964	III	Cloudy	N	14
15 October 1964	IV	Fine	NNE	10
19 October 1964	V	Fine	NNE	9
20 October 1964	VI	Cloudy	N	5
21 October 1964	VII	Cloudy	SW	8
