= Philippine Sailing Association =

- Sport: Sailing
- Also governs: Windsurfing
- Category: National Association
- Jurisdiction: Philippines
- Abbreviation: PSA
- Founded: 1964
- Affiliation: World Sailing
- Regional affiliation: Asian Sailing Federation
- Headquarters: National Sailing Center, Pasay
- President: Martin Tanco
- Men's coach: Alan Ridgelly Balladares
- Women's coach: Aziala Belmonte
- Sponsor: Standard Insurance
- (Philippines)

The Philippine Sailing Association (PSA) is the governing body for the sport of sailing in Philippines, recognised by the International Sailing Federation. The Organization hosts and sanctions local competitions such as the Optimist Championship Sailing Reggata,Tali Beach Sailing Festival and the Philippine Hobie 16 Competition. The PSA also exist to develop sailing as a sport across the country. The PSA is responsible for athlete training and selection for international competitions, including the Southeast Asian Games.

== History ==
Sailing as a sport was introduced to the Philippines in 1907 during the establishment of the Albay Yacht Club. In 1927, American businessman, James Rockwell, along with fellow sailors established the Manila Yacht Club (MYC). The MYC became the center for sailing in Manila Bay. During this time a partnership with the De La Salle University was established to provide training to its Sea Scouts forming the core of Filipino youth sailors.

The Philippines first entered a team during the 1960 Rome Summer Olympics with the attendance of Jesus Maria Villareal, Fausto Preysler, Jaime Prieto, and Francisco Gonzales competing in the Dragon class event.

In 1964, Jesus Villareal, along with members from the MYC established the Philippine Sailing Association. The same year, Villareal along with Preysler, and Feliciano Juntareal represented the Philippines during the 1964 Tokyo Summer Olympics, sailing the yacht Kalayaan in Enoshima.

The Philippines continued its Olympic appearance in 1968 in Mexico with Manuel Villareal entering in the One-Person Heavyweight Dinghy (Finn). In 1972 in Munich, the PSA once more sent a 3-person keelboat team composed of Alfonso Qua, Ambrosio Santos, and Mario Almario.

In 1980, Hobie Cat established its Asian production for Hobie 14s in Bataan. The Philippines became the venue of the Seventh Hobie 14 World Championship in Puerto Azul, Cavite, from January 14 to 22, 1984. The event established the Hobie 16 fleet racing in the country.

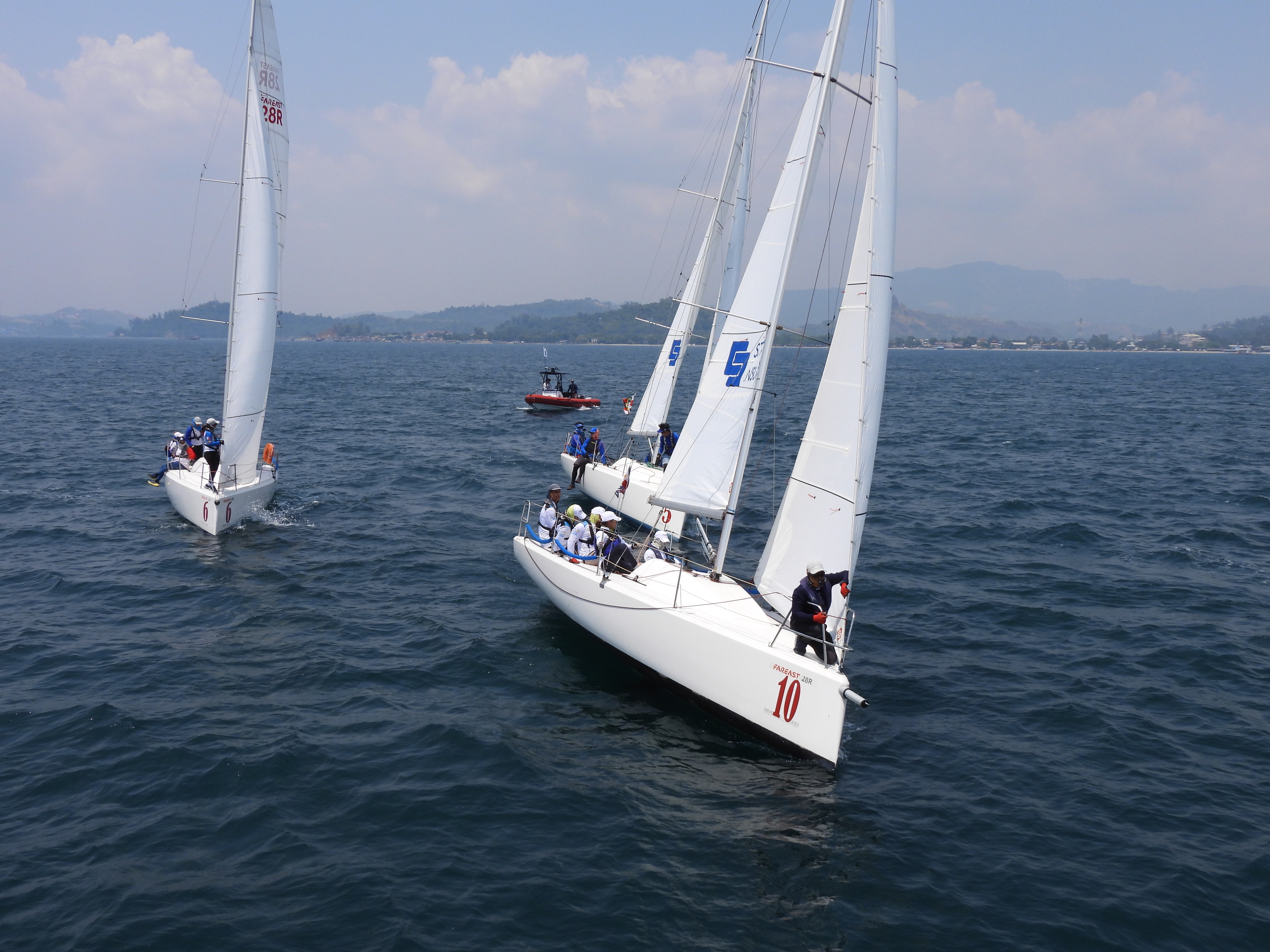
Starting Line during the 2026 Standard Insurance FE28R Regatta

The Philippines first hosted sailing at the SEA Games during the 2005 Southeast Asian Games in Subic Bay, where its athletes won 1 gold, 1 silver, and 3 bronze medals. During the 28th SEA Games in Singapore June 14, 2015, Ridgely Balladares, Richly Magsanay, and Rommel Cruz broke the 10-year gold medal drought of Philippine Sailing in the SEA Games.

When the Philippines hosted the 30th SEA Games in 2019, the PSA once more selected Subic Bay as the venue. The PSA finished its campaign with 2nd overall spot with 3 gold, 1 silver, and 1 bronze medals.

== Programs & Regattas ==
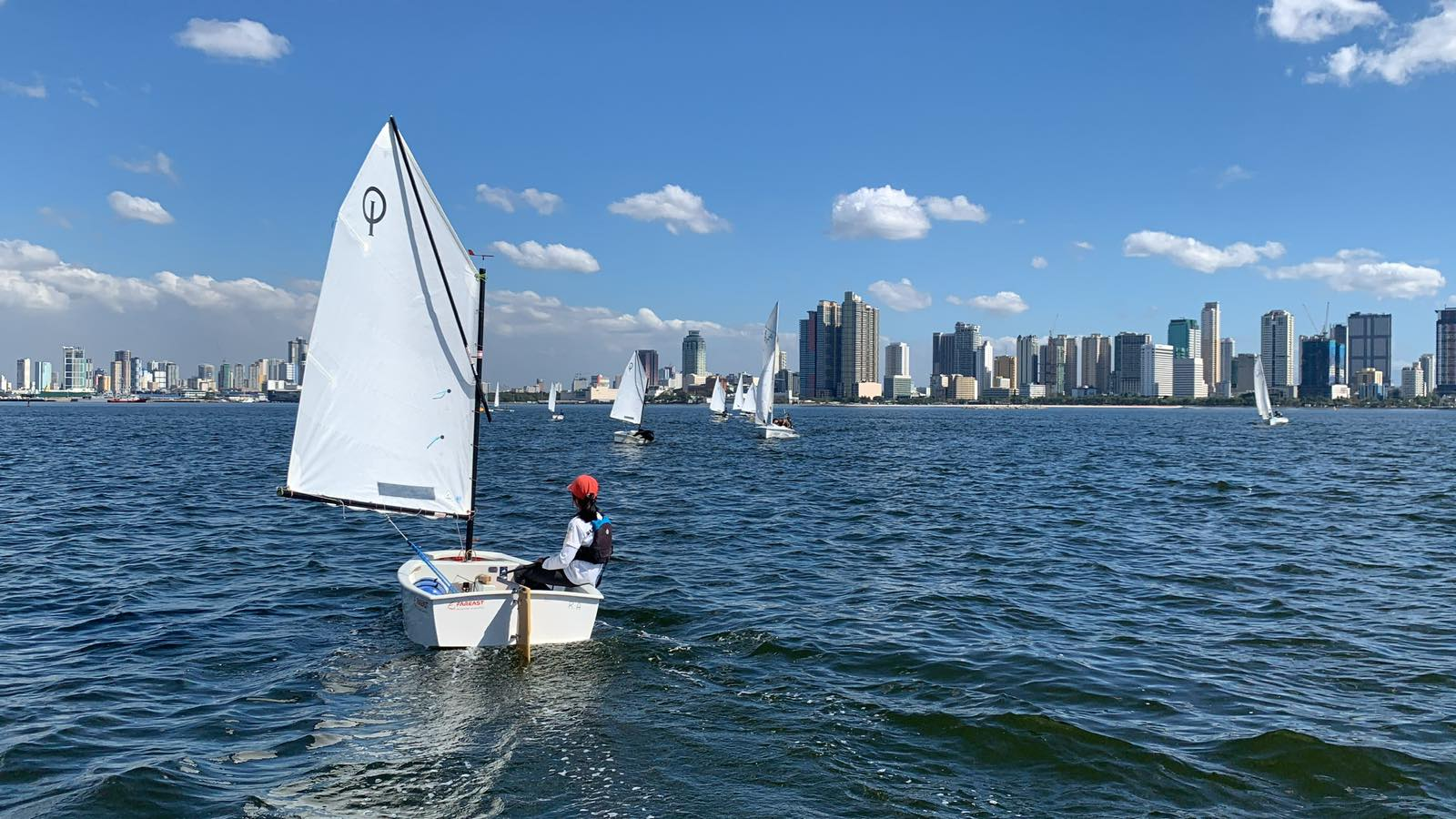
A PSA Optimist sailing offshore during training in Manila Bay.

The PSA conducts regular Basic Sailing Course (BSC) at the National Sailing Center at the Cultural Center of the Philippines, in Pasay. Kids and youth sailing summer enrichment program is also offered for free for any interested individuals from the ages of 6 to 18, where kids go through BSC and Advance Sailing Course in the two-week camp.

The primary annual activity organized by the PSA with the Philippine Sports Commission is the Philippine National Sailing Championships. The events include races for Boys and Girls dinghy utilizing ILCA 4, ILCA 7, 420, and 470. During the 2026 Philippine National Sailing Championship the event was held in Subic Bay, supported by the Philippine Coast Guard, Philippine Coast Guard Auxiliary, and the Subic Bay Metropolitan Authority.

For the grassroots program, the PSA is also supporting sailing communities across the country with the donation of dinghy sailboats to yacht clubs across the country. A number of yacht clubs have received Optimists, and have led to the rotation of races among the venues.

The PSA also organizes one-class keelboat racing in Subic Bay. The Standard Insurance FarEast 28R regattas are held every Chinese New Year and Ninoy Aquino Day, allowing various yacht clubs in the region to pitch their teams against local and international competitors.

The PSA also assist in other regattas organized by various yacht clubs and sailing organizations around the country such as the Philippine Hobie National Championships, and the Boracay Regatta.

== Equipment ==
The PSA primary dinghy and keelboats at the National Sailing Center and Subic Bay are:

1. Optimist
2. ILCA 4
3. ILCA 6
4. ILCA 7
5. 420
6. 470
7. FarEast 28R

== Partner Clubs & Affiliates ==
- Philippine Windsurfing Association
- Manila Yacht Club
- Subic Bay Yacht Club
- Subic Sailing
- Laguna de Bay Boat Club
- Taal Lake Yacht Club
- Caylabne Bay Yacht Club
- Punta Fuego Yacht Club
- Puerto Galera Yacht Club
- Albay Yacht Club
- Mayon Sailing Club
- Philippine Home Boatbuiling Yacht Club
- Balangay Marina Sailing and Yacht Club
- Ocean Racing Club of the Philippines
- Philippine Inter-Island Sailing Foundation

== See also ==
- Philippines at the Olympics
- Sports in the Philippines
