= Stig Käll =

Swedish sailor

Personal information
- Full name: Stig Lennart Käll
- Nationality: Swedish
- Born: 31 August 1938 (age 87) Stockholm, Sweden

Sailing career
- Sport: Sailing
- Club: Vikingarnas Segelsällskap
- Class(es): Flying Dutchman, Half Ton class

Stig Lennart Käll (born 31 August 1938, in Stockholm) is a sailor from Sweden. Käll participated in the Olympic regatta in 1964 Summer Olympics in Enoshima together with his brother Lars Käll ending at 18th place in the Flying Duchman class. The brother were noted for having picked up their Australian competitor John Dawe out of the water and brought him to Ian Winter whose boat had capsized a few hundred meters away. For their efforts, they were awarded a newly-created Fair Play Prize.

Käll also participated in Peter Norlin's crew on Scampi when spectacularly winning the Half ton Cup in Sandhamn 1969.
