= Ralph Roberts (sailor) =

New Zealand sailor (1935–2023)

Ralph Roberts MBE JP
Personal information
- Born: Ralph Hamilton Roberts; 26 September 1935 Takapuna, New Zealand
- Died: 19 March 2023 (aged 87)
- Height: 1.85 m (6 ft 1 in)
- Weight: 82 kg (181 lb)

Sport
- Country: New Zealand
- Sport: Sailing

Ralph Hamilton Roberts MBE JP (26 September 1935 – 19 March 2023) was a New Zealand sailor and sports administrator. He competed at two Olympic Games, in 1960 and 1968, and was Chef de Mission of the New Zealand team at the 1992 Summer Olympics.

== Early life and family ==
Roberts was born on 26 September 1935 in Takapuna, on Auckland's North Shore, the son of Zella Ethel and Ernest Trevor Roberts. He was educated at Takapuna Grammar School, and began sailing at the Takapuna Boating Club when it was located in Bayswater.

== Sailing career ==
Robert earned his first New Zealand sailing title in 1954, aged 19, when he won the national Z class championship. He won the national Z class title again in 1957, and went on to win multiple national titles in the Soling, Finn, and Flying Dutchman classes.

In 1958, Roberts represented New Zealand at the Finn World Championship regatta, and placed second in both the Dutch and Spanish national Finn championships that year. At the 1958 Cowes Regatta, Roberts and Geoff Smale won the Prince of Wales Trophy in the international 14-ft skiffs.

Roberts was selected to represent New Zealand in the Finn class at the 1960 Summer Olympics in Rome after defeating both Peter Mander and Helmer Pedersen in the New Zealand trials; at the Olympics he placed sixth out of 35 competitors. He travelled to the 1964 Summer Olympics in Tokyo as a reserve for the Flying Dutchman crew of Helmer Pedersen and Earle Wells, who went on to win Olympic gold. At the 1968 Summer Olympics in Mexico City, he came eighth in the Flying Dutchman class, sailing with Geoff Smale.

== Sports administration ==
Roberts attended the 1984 Summer Olympics in Los Angeles as sailing manager, and his team won two gold medals (in the Tornado and Finn classes) and one bronze medal (in the Windglider class). He served on the sailing jury at the 1988 Summer Olympics in Pusan. Roberts was Chef de Mission for the 1992 New Zealand Olympic team in Barcelona.

Roberts presided over Yachting New Zealand from 1986 to 1989. In the 1993 Queen's Birthday Honours, He was appointed a Member of the Order of the British Empire, for services to yachting. Roberts held several positions with the International Sailing Federation (ISAF; since renamed to World Sailing). Between 2006 and 2012, Roberts served again on the board of Yachting New Zealand, and he was appointed a life member of Yachting New Zealand in 2011.

Roberts was involved in the establishment of Sport North Harbour, and was a founder of the Waterwise programme.

== Other activities ==
Roberts was owner-operator of Roberts Electrical in Takapuna. He served as chair of the Takapuna Business Association and was one of the founders of Business North Harbour. In 2004, Roberts was inducted into the North Harbour Business Hall of Fame.

In 1978, Roberts was appointed a justice of the peace, and he was also a marriage celebrant.

== Later life ==
Roberts resided in Takapuna where his house fronted Lake Pupuke, and was a member of the Harbour Access Trust. Roberts described fellow Olympic sailor and North Shore resident, Geoff Smale, as his "best mate" after Smale died in a Dyn'Aéro microlight crash in 2011.

Roberts died on 19 March 2023, at the age of 87.
