= Musto =

Musto is both an Italian and English surname (from different sources) and can refer to:

== People with the surname ==
- Adrian Musto, Italian director of photography
- Alissa Musto, American singer and pianist
- Arnold Musto (born 1883), British civil engineer who designed the Sukkur Barrage
- Biagio Musto, bishop of Sora-Aquino-Pontecorvo (1952-1971)
- Franklyn Musto, English athlete at the 1964 Olympics
- Glenn Musto, singer-songwriter of pop band College Fall
- Keith Musto, British sailor at the 1964 Olympics.
- Manuel Musto, Argentinian impressionist painter
- Matthew Musto, known as Blackbear, American hip-hop artist
- Michael Musto, Italian-American writer
- Raphael J. Musto or Ray Musto, American politician from Pennsylvania
- Tommy Musto, an American record producer from New York
- Tony Musto (1915-1994), Italian-American heavyweight boxer
- William Musto, politician from New Jersey

== Others ==
- Musto (company), an outdoor clothing company headquartered in England
- Musto Skiff, a single-handed sailing skiff

== See also ==
- Mustoe, Highland County, Virginia, an unincorporated community in Virginia, USA
