= Pacific Air Lines Flight 773 =

Aviation accident caused by hijacking

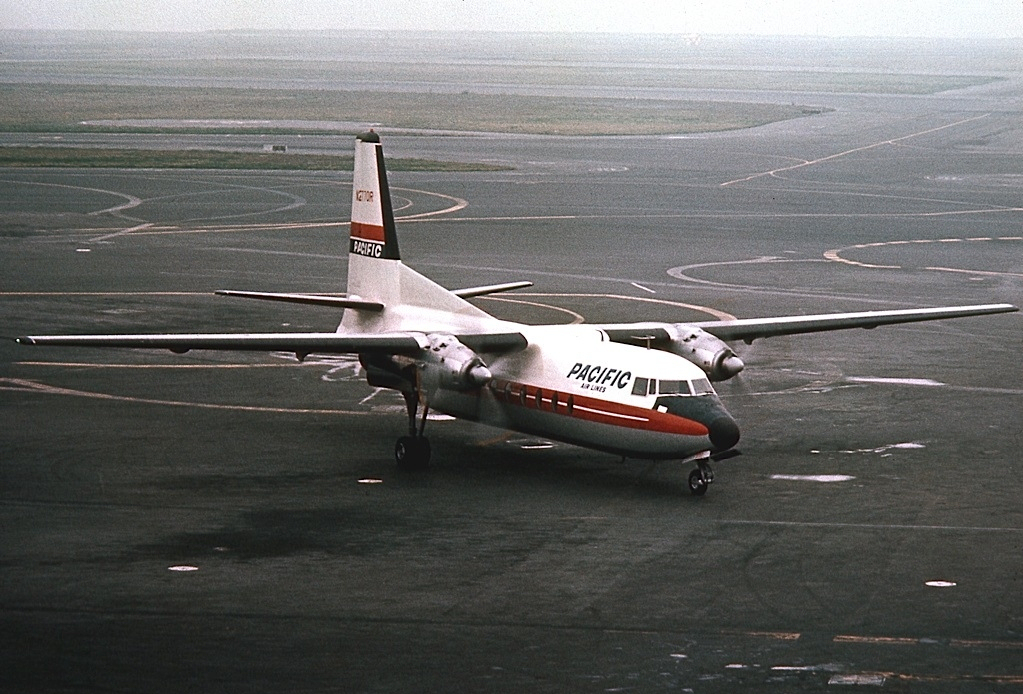
- N2770R, the aircraft involved

Hijacking
- Date: May 7, 1964
- Summary: Mass murder, murder–suicide
- Site: Contra Costa County, near San Ramon, California, U.S.; 37°45′33″N 121°52′25″W

Aircraft
- Aircraft type: Fairchild F27A Friendship
- Operator: Pacific Air Lines
- IATA flight No.: PC773
- ICAO flight No.: PCA773
- Call sign: PACIFIC 773
- Registration: N2770R
- Flight origin: Reno–Tahoe International Airport, Nevada
- Stopover: Stockton Metropolitan Airport; Stockton, California
- Destination: San Francisco International Airport, California
- Occupants: 44
- Passengers: 41 (including the perpetrator)
- Crew: 3
- Fatalities: 44
- Survivors: 0

Pacific Air Lines Flight 773 was a Fairchild F27A Friendship airliner that crashed on May 7, 1964, near San Ramon, California, a suburb in the East Bay, east of Oakland. The crash was most likely the first instance in the United States of an airliner's pilots being shot by a passenger as part of a murder–suicide. Francisco Paula Gonzales, 27, shot both pilots before turning the gun on himself, causing the plane to crash, killing all 44 aboard.

The crash of Flight 773 remains the deadliest act of mass murder in California history, one death more than the subsequent Pacific Southwest Airlines Flight 1771 hijacking in 1987.

== Events preceding the flight ==
Francisco Gonzales, a warehouse worker living in San Francisco, had been "disturbed and depressed" over marital and financial difficulties in the months preceding the crash. Gonzales had competed in the 1960 Summer Olympics for the Philippines as a sailor, and had then emigrated to the United States. Gonzales was deeply in debt and nearly half of his income was committed to loan repayment, and he had informed both relatives and friends that he "would die on either Wednesday, the 6th of May, or Thursday, the 7th of May". In the week preceding the crash, Gonzales referred to his impending death on a daily basis, and purchased a Smith & Wesson Model 27 .357 Magnum revolver through a friend of a friend.

The evening before the crash, before boarding a flight to Reno, Nevada, Gonzales had shown the gun to numerous friends at the airport and told one person that he intended to shoot himself. Gonzales gambled in Reno the night before the fatal flight and told a casino employee that he did not care how much he lost because "it won't make any difference after tomorrow."

== Aircraft ==
The plane, a twin-engined turboprop Fairchild F-27, registration N2770R, was a U.S.-built version of the Fokker F-27 Friendship airliner. Manufactured five years earlier in 1959, it had accumulated about 10,250 flight hours up to its final flight, with Pacific Air Lines as the sole owner and operator.

== Flight ==
The F-27 took off from Reno at 5:54 am PDT, with 33 passengers aboard, including Gonzales, and a crew of three, bound for San Francisco International Airport, with a scheduled stop in Stockton, California. The crew consisted of Captain Ernest A. Clark, 52, pilot in command, First Officer Ray E. Andress, 31, copilot, and flight attendant Margaret E. Schafer, 30. Captain Clark had a total of 20,434 hours of flying experience (including 2,793 hours on the F-27), and First Officer Andress had a total of 6,640 hours, with 988 of them on the F-27.

The plane arrived at Stockton, where two passengers disembarked and ten boarded, bringing the plane's total to 41 passengers. Both disembarking passengers reported that Gonzalez was seated directly behind the cockpit. About 6:38 am, Flight 773 lifted off and headed towards San Francisco International.

== Murder-suicide ==
At 6:48:15, with the aircraft about ten minutes out of Stockton, the Oakland Air Route Traffic Control Center (ARTCC) received a high-pitched, garbled radio message from Flight 773, and the aircraft soon disappeared from the center's radar displays.

With Flight 773 minutes from landing, Gonzales, seated directly behind the cockpit, burst into the cockpit and shot both pilots twice. Gonzales's first bullet hit a tiny section of the frame tubing from Captain Clark's seat. His second bullet killed Clark instantly. He then shot First Officer Andress, critically wounding him. Flying at its assigned altitude of 5,000 feet (1,500 m), Flight 773 went into a steep dive of 2,100 feet (640 m) per minute at an airspeed of nearly 400 mph (350 kn; 640 km/h). The wounded Andress made a last frantic transmission as he tried to pull the plane out of the dive. The flight data recorder showed a sharp climb back to 3,200 feet (980 m). Gonzales most likely shot Andress again, fatally, before shooting himself, causing the plane to go into a final dive.

After attempting unsuccessfully to contact Flight 773, Oakland ARTCC asked another aircraft in the immediate vicinity, United Air Lines Flight 593, if they had the plane in sight. Flight 593's flight crew responded that they did not see Flight 773, but a minute later they reported: "There's a black, uh, cloud of smoke coming up through the undercast at, uh, three-thirty, four o'clock position right now. Looks like (an) oil or gasoline fire." Oakland ARTCC realized that the smoke spotted by the United air crew was likely caused by the crash of Pacific Air Lines Flight 773.

Flight 773 crashed into a rural hillside in southern Contra Costa County, roughly five miles (8 km) east of what is now the city of San Ramon. The plane erupted in flames on impact and dug a crater into the ground. Flight 773's last radio message, from First Officer Andress, was deciphered through laboratory analysis: "Skipper's shot! We've been shot! I was trying to help!"

The official accident report stated that witnesses along the flight path and near the impact area described "extreme and abrupt changes in altitude of Flight 773 with erratic powerplant sounds" before the plane hit a sloping hillside at a relative angle of 90°.

== Investigation ==
Investigators from the Civil Aeronautics Board (CAB, a forerunner organization to today's National Transportation Safety Board [NTSB]) found in the mangled wreckage a damaged Smith & Wesson Model 27 .357 Magnum revolver, holding six spent cartridges. The Federal Bureau of Investigation (FBI) soon joined the CAB in a search for evidence so that the apparent criminal aspects of the case could be pursued. Investigators found that when Gonzales left San Francisco for Reno the day before the fatal flight, he was carrying the .357, and that he had purchased $105,000 worth of life insurance (equivalent to $1,090,000 in 2025) at the San Francisco airport, payable to his wife. The probable cause stated in the CAB accident report was "the shooting of the captain and first officer by a passenger during flight", and the FBI determined that the suicidal Gonzales was the shooter.

== Aftermath ==
Civil air regulation amendments became effective on August 6, 1964, that required that doors separating the passenger cabin from the crew compartment on all scheduled air carrier and commercial aircraft must be kept locked in flight. An exception to the rule remains during takeoff and landing on certain aircraft, such as the Fairchild F-27, where the cockpit door leads to an emergency passenger exit. The amendments were passed by the Federal Aviation Administration prior to the crash of Flight 773, but had not yet become effective.

== See also ==
- Pacific Southwest Airlines Flight 1771
- Federal Express Flight 705
- Accidents and incidents involving the Fokker F27 family
- Aviation safety
- List of accidents and incidents involving commercial aircraft
- List of aviation incidents involving terrorism
- List of accidents and incidents involving airliners in the United States § California
- List of homicides in California
