= Francisco Gonzales (murderer) =

Filipino sailor and mass murderer

- Born: Francisco Paula Gonzales; January 26, 1937; Manila, Philippine Commonwealth
- Died: May 7, 1964 (aged 27); Contra Costa County, California, U.S.
- Cause of death: Suicide by gunshot

Details
- Victims: 43
- Country: United States
- Location: San Ramon, California
- Weapons: Smith & Wesson Model 27 .357 Magnum revolver (fatally shot the pilots, allowing the plane to crash)

Francisco Paula Gonzales (January 26, 1937 – May 7, 1964) was a Filipino sailor and mass murderer. He was the perpetrator behind the crash of Pacific Air Lines Flight 773, where he hijacked the plane and crashed it. The hijacking became the deadliest act of mass murder in California’s history.

He competed in the Dragon event together with Fausto Preysler and Jesus Villareal at the 1960 Summer Olympics. After the Olympics he moved to San Francisco, United States.

A warehouse worker living in San Francisco, Gonzales had been "disturbed and depressed" over marital and financial difficulties in the months preceding the crash. Gonzales was deeply in debt and nearly half of his income was committed to various loan payments, and he had advised both relatives and friends that he "would die on either Wednesday, the 6th of May, or Thursday, the 7th of May."

In the week preceding the crash, Gonzales referred to his impending death on a daily basis, and purchased a Smith & Wesson handgun through a friend of a friend. Before boarding a flight to Reno, Nevada the evening before the crash, he had shown the gun to numerous friends at the airport and told one person he intended to kill himself. Gonzales gambled in Reno the night before the fatal flight and told a casino employee that he didn't care how much he lost because "it won't make any difference after tomorrow."

At some point, his wife requested a divorce and he fell into debt. He flew to Reno, Nevada on May 6, 1964. The next day Gonzales was on his return flight: Pacific Air Lines Flight 773. He shot and killed both pilots, and then himself. The Fairchild F-27 crashed, killing all 44 people on board. Investigation showed Gonzales had taken out a $100,000 life insurance policy for his wife.
