= Queiroz =

Queiroz may refer to:

- Queiroz, São Paulo, a municipality in the state of São Paulo in Brazil
- Queiroz (surname)
- Queiroz (Brazilian footballer)
