= Queiros =

Queiros (or Queirós) is a Portuguese surname. It may refer to:

- Alberto Queiros (born 1978), French footballer
- Antônio de Queirós Teles, Baron of Jundiaí (1789–1870), Brazilian politician
- Carlota Pereira de Queirós (1892–1982), Brazilian feminist and politician
- Joel Queirós (born 1982), Portuguese footballer
- José Maria de Eça de Queirós (1845–1900), Portuguese novelist, journalist, and diplomat
- Pedro Fernandes de Queirós (1565–1614), Portuguese navigator and explorer
- Pedro Queirós (born 1984), Portuguese footballer
- Renato Queirós (born 1977), Portuguese footballer

== See also ==
- Queiroz, São Paulo, Brazilian municipality in the state of São Paulo
- Queiroz (surname)
