= Mehren (surname) =

Mehren is a surname. Notable people with the surname include:

- August Ferdinand Mehren (1822–1907), Danish Orientalist and philologist
- Hans Mehren (born 1945), Norwegian sailor
- Kay Mehren, American-Canadian veterinarian
- Martin Mehren (1905–2002), Norwegian businessman and sportsman
- Stein Mehren (1935–2017), Norwegian poet, essayist and playwright
