= Kenjiro Matsuda =

Japanese sailor

Personal information
- Nationality: Japanese
- Born: 23 June 1935
- Died: 25 April 2004 (aged 68)

Sailing career
- Class: Flying Dutchman

Kenjiro Matsuda (松田 健次郎, Matsuda Kenjirō, 23 June 1935 – 25 April 2004)) was a Japanese sailor. He competed in the Flying Dutchman event at the 1964 Summer Olympics together with Yasutoshi Tagami.
