= Einar Koefoed (sailor) =

Norwegian sailor

Personal information
- Nationality: Norwegian
- Born: 22 March 1942 (age 83) Asker, Norway

Sport
- Sport: Sailing

Einar Koefoed (born 22 March 1942) is a Norwegian former sailor. He competed in the Flying Dutchman event at the 1964 Summer Olympics.
