= Edwin Parry =

British sailor

Edwin Martin Parry (born 14 March 1935, in Yorkshire) is a British former sailor who competed in the 1964 Summer Olympics where his team finished 4th in the Dragon class competition.
