= Eberhard Reschwamm =

German sailor

Personal information
- Nationality: German
- Born: 26 March 1940 (age 85) Gradnitsa, Bulgaria

Sport
- Sport: Sailing

Eberhard Reschwamm (born 26 March 1940) is a German sailor. He competed in the Flying Dutchman event at the 1964 Summer Olympics.
