= Prateep Areerob =

Thai sailor

Personal information
- Nationality: Thai
- Born: 16 March 1924

Sport
- Sport: Sailing

Prateep Areerob (born 16 March 1924) was a Thai sailor. He competed in the Dragon event at the 1964 Summer Olympics.
