= Alain-François Lehoerff =

French sailor

Personal information
- Nationality: French
- Born: 21 May 1941; Cancale, France
- Died: 26 December 2003 (aged 62); Bordeaux, France

Sport
- Sport: Sailing

Alain-François Lehoerff (21 May 1941 – 26 December 2003) was a French sailor. He competed in the Flying Dutchman event at the 1964 Summer Olympics.
