= Tadashi Funaoka =

Japanese sailor

Personal information
- Nationality: Japanese
- Born: 15 November 1932 (age 93)

Sport
- Sport: Sailing

Tadashi Funaoka (born 15 November 1932) is a Japanese sailor. He competed in the Dragon event at the 1964 Summer Olympics.
