= Saburo Tanamachi =

Japanese sailor (born 1931)

Personal information
- Nationality: Japanese
- Born: 12 July 1931
- Died: between April 2014 and January 2020

Sport
- Sport: Sailing

Saburo Tanamachi (born 12 July 1931, date of death unknown) was a Japanese sailor. He competed in the Dragon event at the 1964 Summer Olympics. Tanamachi died between April 2014 and January 2020.
