= Valery Nikolin =

Russian sailor

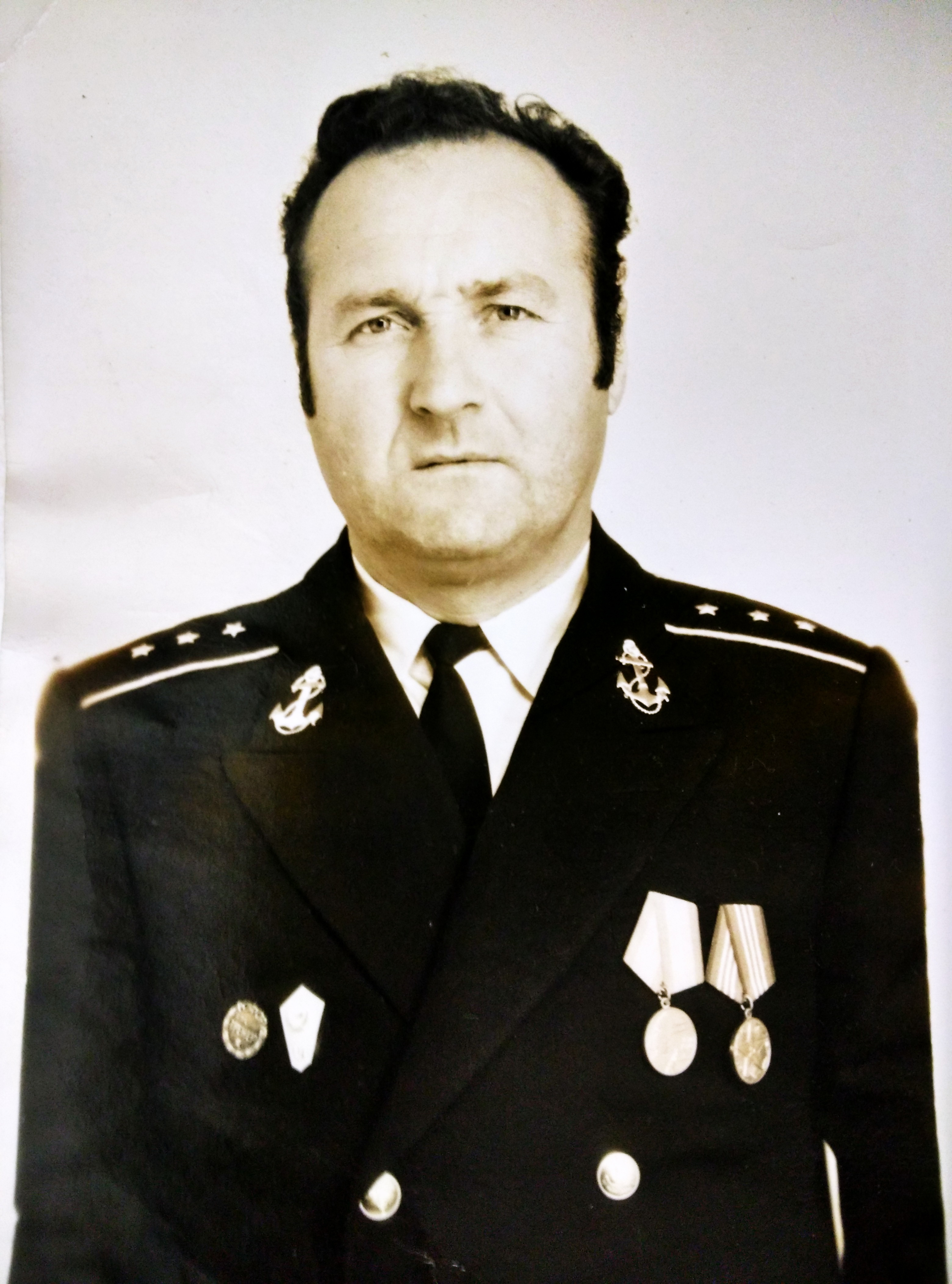

Personal information
- Born: 14 December 1939
- Died: 15 December 2000 (aged 61)
- Height: 172 cm (5 ft 8 in)
- Weight: 71 kg (157 lb)

Sport
- Sport: Sailing
- Club: Soviet Navy

Valery Konstantinovich Nikolin (Russian: Валерий Констатинович Николин; 4 December 1939 – 15 December 2000) was a Russian sailor. He competed in the Dragon class at the 1964 Summer Olympics and placed ninth. Domestically Nikolin won three Soviet titles, in 1963, 1965 and 1968. After retiring from competitions he worked as a sailing coach.
