= Teruyuki Horie =

Japanese sailor

Personal information
- Nationality: Japanese
- Born: 15 January 1933 (age 93)

Sport
- Sport: Sailing

Teruyuki Horie (born 15 January 1933) is a Japanese sailor. He competed in the Dragon event at the 1964 Summer Olympics.
