= Pacific Southwest Airlines Flight 1771 =

1987 airliner hijacking in California

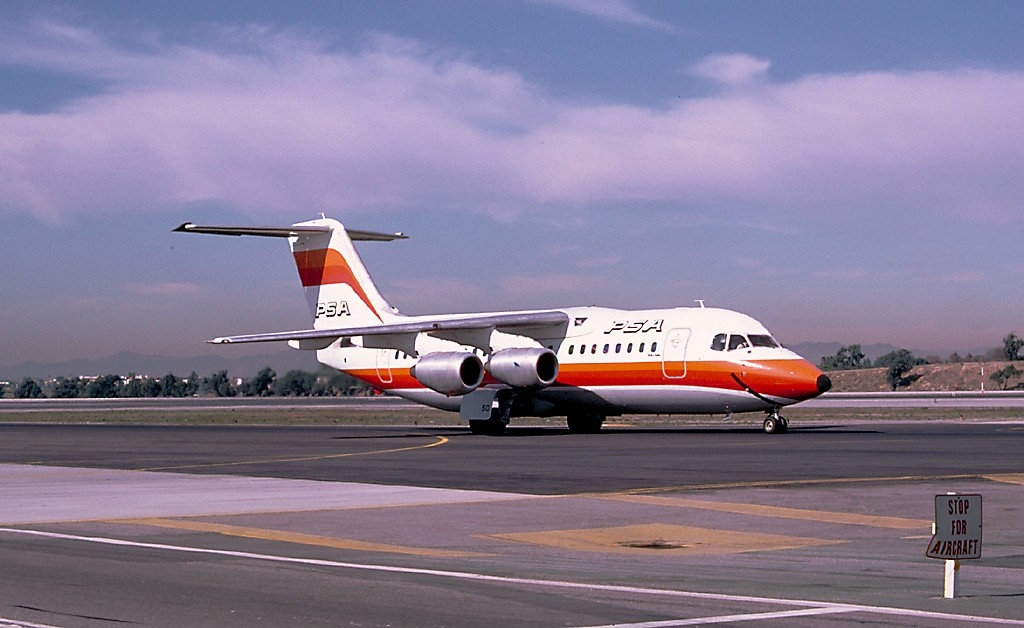
- N350PS at Los Angeles International Airport in December 1986

Hijacking
- Date: December 7, 1987
- Summary: Murder–suicide involving gunfire and intentional interference with the flight crew
- Site: San Luis Obispo County, California, United States

Aircraft
- Aircraft type: British Aerospace 146-200
- Operator: Pacific Southwest Airlines
- Registration: N350PS
- Flight origin: Los Angeles International Airport
- Destination: San Francisco International Airport
- Occupants: 43
- Passengers: 38
- Crew: 5
- Fatalities: 43
- Survivors: 0

Pacific Southwest Airlines Flight 1771 was a scheduled passenger flight from Los Angeles International Airport to San Francisco International Airport that crashed in San Luis Obispo County, California, on December 7, 1987, following an armed attack aboard the aircraft. All 43 people aboard the British Aerospace 146-200, registered N350PS, were killed.

The attacker, David Burke, was a recently dismissed USAir employee whose former supervisor was a passenger. The National Transportation Safety Board (NTSB) attributed the crash to intentional interference and sabotage by Burke and identified deficiencies in airline security as contributing factors. The crash prompted the Federal Aviation Administration (FAA) to restrict exemptions from security screening for airline and airport employees.

== Aircraft and occupants ==
The aircraft was a four-engine British Aerospace 146-200, serial number E2027, operated by Pacific Southwest Airlines (PSA). It had accumulated 8,571 flight hours and was powered by Lycoming ALF 502-R3 turbofan engines. There were 38 passengers and five crew members aboard.

The pilots were Gregg Lindamood and James Nunn; flight attendants were Debbie Neil, Debra Vuylsteke, and Julie Gottesman. Lindamood had joined the airline in 1973 and Nunn in March 1987. Lindamood had about 11,000 flight hours, 1,500 of them on the BAe 146; Nunn had about 12,000 hours, 300 of them on the type.

Other airline employees aboard included Captain Douglas Arthur and John Conte.

Among the passengers were Chevron USA president James Sylla and three colleagues, and three Pacific Bell managers.

== Background ==
=== David Burke ===
David Augustus Burke was born on May 18, 1952, in Croydon, Surrey, England, to Jamaican parents, and emigrated to the United States with them. He was 35 and had worked for USAir for 14 years when he was dismissed. Before moving to California, he had worked in Rochester, New York.

Contemporary reporting described earlier allegations of violence and crime including drug charges, motor vehicle theft, and shoplifting. Police said that, shortly before the crash, Burke held his former girlfriend and her daughter at gunpoint during a drive; no charges followed because she declined to file a complaint. Rochester police also said that Burke had been investigated in connection with suspected drug trafficking, but had not been charged.

=== Dismissal and boarding ===
USAir dismissed ticket agent David Burke on November 19, 1987, after accusing him of stealing $69 in receipts from onboard liquor sales. His former supervisor, Raymond Thomson, regularly flew between his workplace in Los Angeles and his home in the San Francisco Bay Area. After an unsuccessful appeal to Thomson for reinstatement, Burke bought a ticket for Flight 1771, the same flight as Thomson, on December 7.

An FBI affidavit described that Burke had borrowed a Smith & Wesson .44 Magnum handgun and ammunition from a fellow USAir employee in November. On December 7, Burke passed through airport security without being screened and brought this handgun onto the aircraft. The FAA's later account states that Burke used an airline identification card retained after his dismissal to bypass screening.

== Flight and crash ==
The flight left Los Angeles at about 3:30 p.m. Pacific Standard Time. At 4:13 p.m., a pilot reported an emergency and gunshots aboard the aircraft to Oakland Air Route Traffic Control Center. Controllers observed the aircraft beginning a rapid descent within 25 seconds of the report.

The aircraft struck the ground at about 4:16 p.m. Witnesses described it descending steeply, with no visible fire before impact. The crash site was near Old Creek Road and Highway 46, between Templeton and Cambria. The aircraft struck a hillside on the Santa Rita cattle ranch in the Santa Lucia Mountains and disintegrated on impact.

A note, recovered after the crash, was written on an airsickness bag and linked Burke's threat to the refusal of his request for leniency:

Hi Ray. I think it's sort of ironical that we end up like this. I asked for some leniency for my family. Remember? Well, I got none and you'll get none.

== Investigation ==
The San Luis Obispo County Sheriff's Office, the Federal Bureau of Investigation (FBI), and the NTSB investigated the crash.

The cockpit voice recorder had captured a disturbance and the sound of gunfire near the flight deck. Early in the investigation, NTSB vice-chair Patricia Goldman said the recording established that someone had entered the cockpit without authorization. Investigators found no evidence of mechanical failure, although the flight data recorder was badly damaged.

On December 10, CBS News reported, citing unnamed sources, that on the cockpit voice recording, a flight attendant had announced a problem, followed by another voice, presumably Burke's, replying "I'm the problem." The Associated Press reported this account the following day. The FBI subsequently corrected the early dialogue reports after enhancing the recording.

The NTSB investigation concluded that a passenger's, namely Burke's, intentional interference and sabotage had caused the loss of control. Its findings also recorded the incapacitation of both pilots and Burke's suicide. It identified inadequate airline security and procedures, together with insufficient FAA requirements, as contributing factors. Reporting on the board's findings in January 1989 described the attack as a targeted act of revenge against Burke's former supervisor.

== Aftermath ==
=== Security changes ===
In December 1987, the FAA issued an emergency amendment limiting the circumstances in which airline and airport employees could pass screening checkpoints without inspection. In its later review of aviation-security regulation, the FAA specifically linked this amendment to Flight 1771.

A December 17, 1987, General Accounting Office review identified weaknesses in employee screening and control of identification badges at high-risk airports. It recommended better accounting for badges, enforcement of identification requirements, and reconsideration of employee exemptions from passenger screening. Later federal measures required the immediate seizure of airline and airport employee credentials on termination, resignation or retirement.

=== Corporate travel ===
Some companies introduced or revised restrictions on executives traveling together after the crash. These policies limited how many senior officers could share a commercial or corporate aircraft.

=== Memorial and litigation ===
A joint funeral for unidentified victims was held at Los Osos Valley Memorial Park on December 16, 1987.

PSA arranged flights for relatives attending the service. A funeral coordinator said the graves would share a memorial headstone and that work to identify remains would continue.

In June 1989, the remaining plaintiffs settled their negligence claims without admissions of liability; claims for damages remained possible.

== Dramatization ==
The crash was the subject of "I'm the Problem", an episode of the documentary series Air Disasters. Paramount+ lists it as the third episode of the third season, dated March 17, 2013.

== See also ==
- Pacific Air Lines Flight 773
- Pacific Southwest Airlines Flight 182
- Suicide by pilot
