= Earl Taylor =

Jamaican sailor (1932–2024)

Personal information
- Full name: Earl Gladson Taylor
- Nationality: Jamaican
- Born: 22 July 1932; Montego Bay, Jamaica
- Died: 9 June 2024 (aged 91); Florida, U.S.

Sport
- Sport: Sailing

Earl Gladston Taylor (22 July 1932 – 9 June 2024) was a Jamaican sailor. He competed in the Dragon event at the 1964 Summer Olympics. Taylor died in Florida on 9 June 2024, at the age of 91.
