= Anthony Crossley (sailor) =

Rhodesian sailor (born 1939)

Personal information
- Nationality: Rhodesian
- Born: 3 May 1939 (age 86)

Sport
- Sport: Sailing

Anthony James Crossley (born 3 May 1939) is a Rhodesian former sailor. He competed in the Flying Dutchman event at the 1964 Summer Olympics.
