= Henny Scholtz =

Dutch sailor

Personal information
- Full name: Hendrik Jacobus Scholtz
- Nationality: Dutch
- Born: 30 January 1911 Amsterdam, Netherlands
- Died: Year of death missing Place of death missing
- Height: 1.78 m (5.8 ft)

Sport

Sailing career
- Class: Dragon
- Updated on 2014-01-09

Hendrik Jacobus "Henny" Scholtz (born 30 January 1911 in Amsterdam) was a sailor from the Netherlands, who represented his country at the 1964 Summer Olympics in Enoshima. Scholtz, as crew on the Dutch Dragon took the 13th place with helmsman Wim van Duyl, fellow crew member Jan Jongkind (Race 1 – 4) and Dick Wayboer (Race 5 – 7).

In the 1936 Olympics in Kiel Scholtz was substitute for the Dutch Star who took the Bronze medal. Scholtz was also heavily involved in the preparation of the Dutch Olympic Sailing Team for the 1980 Summer Olympics in Tallinn.

== Sources ==
- "Henny Scholtz Bio, Stats, and Results". Olympic Sports. Sports-Reference.com. Archived from the original on 2014-01-09.
- "Na de Olympische Spelen te Berlijn. Ons land behoort tot de sterkste Sport-naties der wereld" (in Dutch) (Dag ed.). De Graafschap-bode. 1936-08-19.
- "Sport in beeld/De revue der sporten jrg 29, 1936, no 51, 20-07-1936" (in Dutch) (51 ed.). Sport in beeld/De revue der sporten. 1936-07-20.
- "Des duivels" (in Dutch) (Daily ed.). De Telegraaf. 1978-06-29.
- "Zeilploeg voor Tokio bekend" (in Dutch). Het vrĳe volk : democratisch-socialistisch dagblad. 1964-05-09.
- "Kunde" (in Dutch) (Day ed.). De Telegraaf. 1964-09-21.
