= Queiroz (surname) =

Queiroz (or Queiróz) is a Portuguese surname. It may refer to:

== Queiroz ==
- Agnelo Queiroz (born 1958), Brazilian politician
- António Eça de Queiroz (1891–1968), Portuguese monarchist
- Carlos Queiroz (born 1953), Portuguese football manager
- Carolina Queiroz (born 1995), Brazilian freestyle swimmer
- Clayson Queiroz (born 1978), Brazilian footballer
- Diego Queiróz de Oliveira (born 1990), Brazilian footballer
- Edson Queiroz (1925–1982), Brazilian entrepreneur
- Eduardo de Queiroz (born 1936), Portuguese sailor and Olympic competitor
- Francisca Queiroz (born 1979), Brazilian actress
- Francisco Teixeira de Queiroz (1848–1919; pen named "Bento Moreno"), Portuguese novelist
- Hélder Queiroz (born 1963), Brazilian conservation biologist, primatologist and fish behaviorist
- Joaquim Queiróz (born 1971), Portuguese sprint canoer
- José Maria de Eça de Queiroz (1845–1900), Portuguese author
- Larissa Queiroz (born 1984), Brazilian actress
- Liliana Queiroz (born 1985), Portuguese model
- Manuel Queiróz (born 1883), Portuguese fencer and Olympic competitor
- Maria Isaura Pereira de Queiróz (1918–2018), Brazilian sociologist
- Miguel Queiroz (born 1991), Portuguese basketballer
- Protógenes Queiroz (born 1959), Brazilian Federal Police officer
- Rachel de Queiroz (1910–2003), Brazilian author and journalist
- Rodrigo José Queiroz Chagas (born 1973), Brazilian footballer
- Ronan Queiroz de Paula Afonso (born 1994), Brazilian footballer
- Ruy de Queiroz (born 1958), Brazilian philosopher of mathematics and electrical engineer
- Sérgio de Queiroz Duarte (1934-2024), Brazilian diplomat
- Tácio Caetano Cruz Queiroz (born 1980), Brazilian footballer
- Vinicius Queiroz (born 1983), Brazilian mixed martial artist
- Viviane de Queiroz Pereira (born 1994; known as "Pocah" or "MC Pocahontas"), Brazilian singer and television personality
- Wolney Queiroz (born 1972), Brazilian businessman and politician

== See also ==
- Queiros, a spelling variant of Queiroz
- Queiroz, São Paulo, Brazilian municipality in the state of São Paulo
