= Dick Wayboer =

Dutch sailor

Personal information
- Full name: Dirk Wayboer
- Nationality: Dutch
- Born: 11 May 1936 (age 90) Jisp
- Height: 1.82 m (6.0 ft)

Sport

Sailing career
- Class: Dragon
- Updated on 2014-01-09

Dirk "Dick" Wayboer (11 May 1936, Jisp) is a sailor from the Netherlands, who represented his country at the 1964 Summer Olympics in Enoshima. Wayboer, as crew (Race 3 – 7) on the Dutch Dragon took the 13th place with helmsman Wim van Duyl, fellow crew member Henny Scholtz and Jan Jongkind (Race 1 – 2).

== Sources ==
- "Zeilploeg voor Tokio bekend" (in Dutch). Het vrĳe volk : democratisch-socialistisch dagblad. 1964-05-09.
- "Kunde" (in Dutch) (Day ed.). De Telegraaf. 1964-09-21.
- "Geen familie-omstandigheden maar.... Moeilijkheden in Tokio leidden tot terugkeer Jan Jongkind: "pijnlijke zaak" (in Dutch) (Day ed.). Dagblad De Telegraaf. 1964-10-17.
- "The Games of the XVIII Olympiad Tokio 1964, The Official Report of the Organizing Committee Volume One Part One" (PDF). 1964. Archived from the original (pdf) on 2010-05-06.
- "The Games of the XVIII Olympiad Tokio 1964, The Official Report of the Organizing Committee Volume One Part Two" (PDF). 1964. Archived from the original (pdf) on 2008-11-18.
- "The Games of the XVIII Olympiad Tokio 1964, The Official Report of the Organizing Committee Volume Two Part One" (PDF). 1964. Archived from the original (pdf) on 2008-02-26.
- "The Games of the XVIII Olympiad Tokio 1964, The Official Report of the Organizing Committee Volume Two Part Two" (PDF). 1964. Archived from the original (pdf) on 2009-01-26.
