= Richard Lennox =

Canadian sailor

Personal information
- Nationality: Canadian
- Born: 14 August 1938 (age 88)

Sport
- Sport: Sailing

Richard Lennox (born 14 August 1938) is a Canadian sailor. He competed in the Flying Dutchman event at the 1964 Summer Olympics.
