= Cordell Barrow =

Trinidad and Tobago sailor (1940–2003)

Personal information
- Nationality: Trinidad and Tobago
- Born: 15 April 1940
- Died: 11 June 2003 (aged 63)

Sport
- Sport: Sailing

Cordell Hull Barrow (15 April 1940 – 11 June 2003) was a Trinidad and Tobago sailor. He competed in the Flying Dutchman event at the 1964 Summer Olympics.
