= John J. McNamara (author) =

American sailor

Medal record

Men's sailing

Representing United States

Olympic Games
Bronze medal – third place	1964 Tokyo	5.5 metre class

John Joseph McNamara Jr. (February 7, 1932 – October 18, 1986), also known as Don McNamara, was an American banker, athlete, and author who won a bronze medal for sailing in the 1964 Summer Olympics.

== Biography ==
Born February 7, 1932, in Boston, Massachusetts. Son of John J. McNamara and Kathleen Tobin. Graduated from Harvard University with an A.B. in 1953.

After winning national titles in sailing in 1951 and 1955, he with two teammates, won the bronze medal in the 5.5 Meter class for Sailing in the 1964 Summer Olympics, held in Japan. He married Ann Louise Greep later that same year. They had three daughters.

He was a special agent in the U.S. Army Counter-Intelligence Corps from 1953 to 1957. He later worked as an investment banker and then turned to free-lance writing in 1970.

He died October 18, 1986, in Boston, Massachusetts. His obituary appears in the New York Times on October 24, 1986.

== Works ==
- White Sails, Black Clouds, Burdette, 1967
- The Money Maker, Crowell, 1972
- The Billion Dollar Catch, Mead, New York, 1987
