= Jan Jongkind =

Dutch sailor (1932–2024)

Personal information
- Full name: Jan Marinus Jongkind
- Nationality: Dutch
- Born: 19 September 1932 Aalsmeer, Netherlands
- Died: 6 June 2024 (aged 91) Aalsmeer, Netherlands
- Height: 1.78 m (5.8 ft)

Sport

Sailing career
- Class(es): Flying Dutchman; Soling; Dragon
- Updated on 2014-01-09

Jan Marinus Jongkind (19 September 1932 – 6 June 2024) was a Dutch sailor, who represented his country at the 1964 Summer Olympics in Enoshima. Jonkind, as crew (Race 1 – 2) on the Dutch Dragon took the 13th place with helmsman Wim van Duyl, fellow crew member Henny Scholtz and Dick Wayboer (Race 3 – 7).

Before his Dragon period Jongkind sailed at a high level in the Flying Dutchman. From 1968 – 1969 Jongkind sailed the Soling.

Jongkind is one of the first sailmakers who successfully used Dacron as base material for modern racing sails.

Jongkind died in Aalsmeer on 6 June 2024, at the age of 91.

== Ban from International regattas ==
During the Olympic regatta of 1964 a controversy emerged between the team members (Van Duyl & Jongkind) of the Dutch Dragon. This escalated and Jongkind left Japan after the second race. After the Games the Royal Dutch Yacht Racing Union ruled that because of their behavior, both team members were not allowed to sail in International regattas for the next two years.

== Sources ==
- "Jan Jongkind Bio, Stats, and Results". Olympic Sports. Sports-Reference.com. Archived from the original on 9 January 2014.
- "Zeilploeg voor Tokio bekend" (in Dutch). Het vrĳe volk : democratisch-socialistisch dagblad. 9 May 1964.
- "Kunde" (in Dutch) (Day ed.). De Telegraaf. 21 September 1964.
- "Geen familie-omstandigheden maar.... Moeilijkheden in Tokio leidden tot terugkeer Jan Jongkind: "pijnlijke zaak" (in Dutch) (Day ed.). Dagblad De Telegraaf. 17 October 1964.
- "Olympische zeilers Van Duyl en Jan Jongkind gestraft" (in Dutch). Leeuwarder courant : hoofdblad van Friesland. 16 December 1964.
- "The Games of the XVIII Olympiad Tokio 1964, The Official Report of the Organizing Committee Volume One Part One" (PDF). 1964. Archived from the original (pdf) on 6 May 2010.
- "The Games of the XVIII Olympiad Tokio 1964, The Official Report of the Organizing Committee Volume One Part Two" (PDF). 1964. Archived from the original (pdf) on 18 November 2008.
- "The Games of the XVIII Olympiad Tokio 1964, The Official Report of the Organizing Committee Volume Two Part One" (PDF). 1964. Archived from the original (pdf) on 26 February 2008.
- "The Games of the XVIII Olympiad Tokio 1964, The Official Report of the Organizing Committee Volume Two Part Two" (PDF). 1964. Archived from the original (pdf) on 26 January 2009.
