= Erdoğan Arsal =

Turkish sailor

Personal information
- Nationality: Turkish
- Born: 20 December 1933 (age 91)

Sport
- Sport: Sailing

Erdoğan Arsal (born 20 December 1933) is a Turkish sailor. He competed in the Flying Dutchman event at the 1964 Summer Olympics.
