= Juan Frias =

Mexican sailor

Personal information
- Nationality: Mexican
- Born: 24 September 1918

Sport
- Sport: Sailing

Juan Frias (born 24 September 1918, date of death unknown) was a Mexican sailor. He competed in the Dragon event at the 1964 Summer Olympics.
