= Smith & Wesson Model 28 =

Revolver made by Smith & Wesson

S&W Model 28
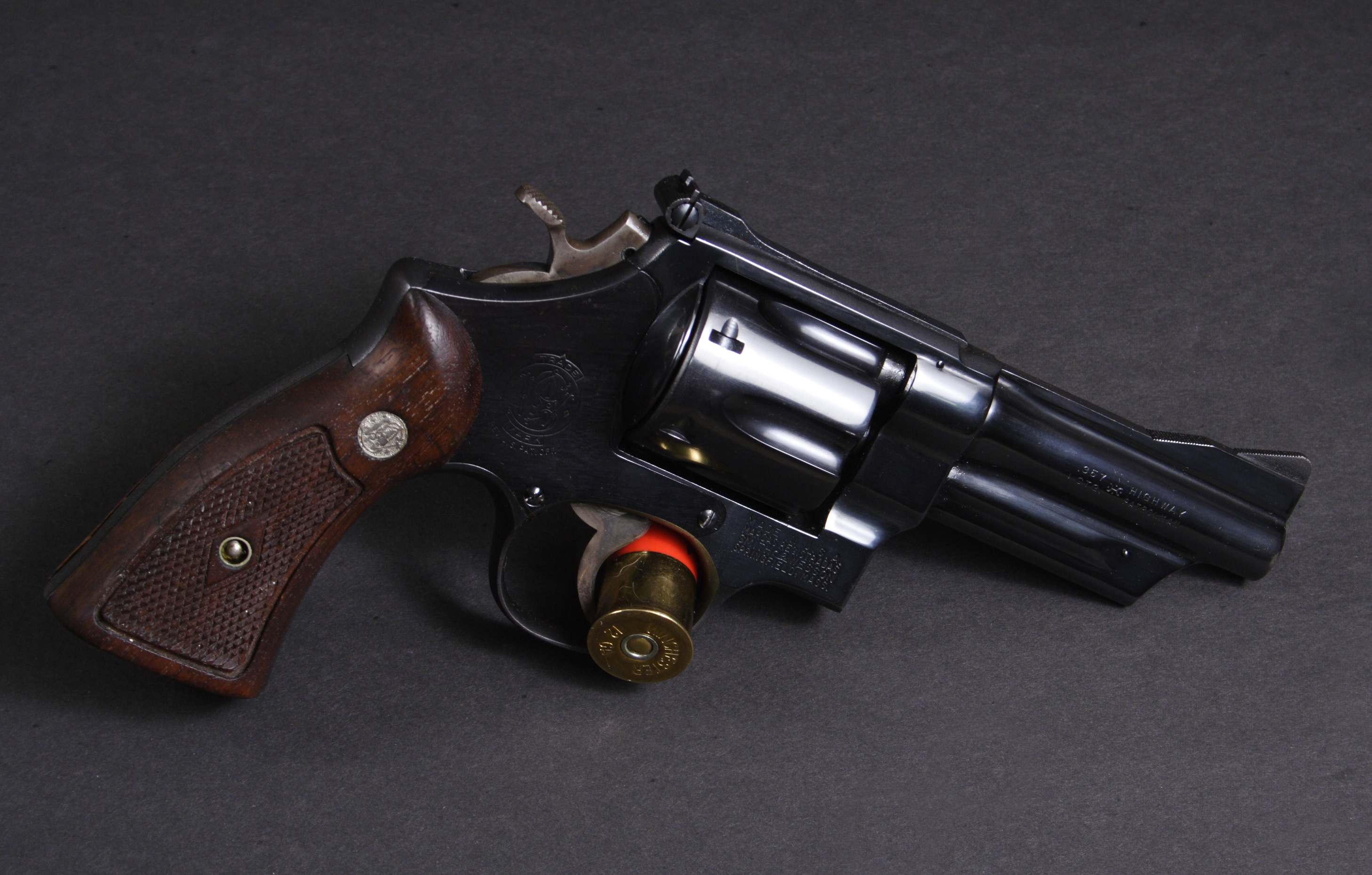
- Smith & Wesson Model 28-2
- Type: Revolver
- Place of origin: United States

Service history
- Used by: See § Users

Production history
- Manufacturer: Smith & Wesson
- Produced: 1954–1986
- Variants: Blued Steel model. Available with 4 in and 6 in barrels. Fewer than 100 reported as being manufactured with 8 3/8 in barrel. Twenty-five guns with 5 in barrels and nickel finish marked "F.H.P." (Florida Highway Patrol) #32 through #56 shipped in 1959.

Specifications
- Mass: 4" barrel model: 41 oz (1,162 g); 6" barrel model: 44 oz (1,247 g); 8 3/8" barrel model: 47 oz (1,332 g)
- Cartridge: .357 Magnum
- Action: Double Action
- Feed system: 6-round cylinder
- Sights: Adjustable rear sights and Baughman front sight.

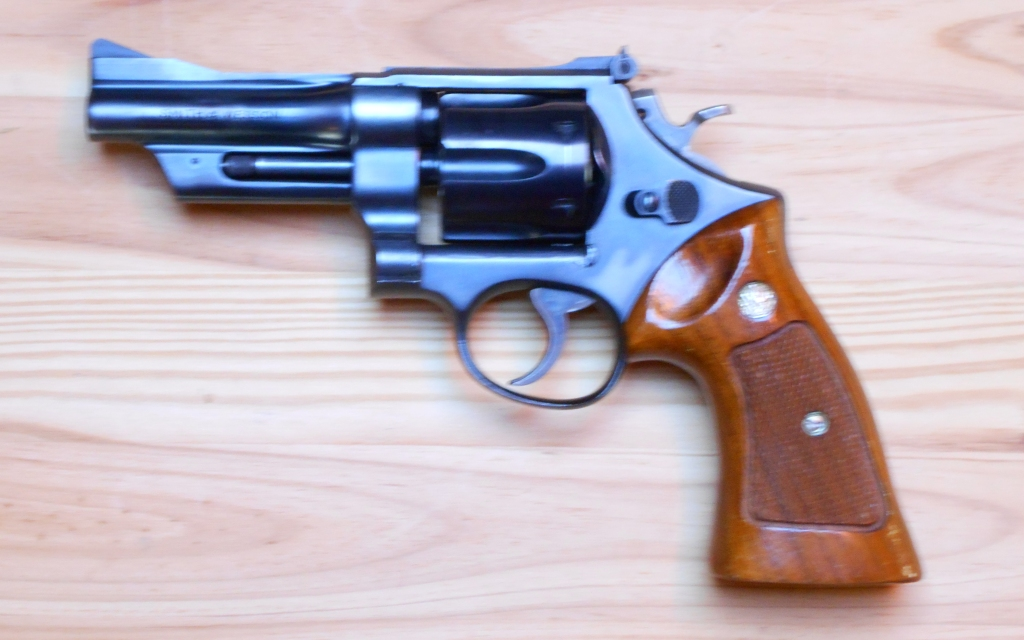
S&W Model 28, 4 in barrel

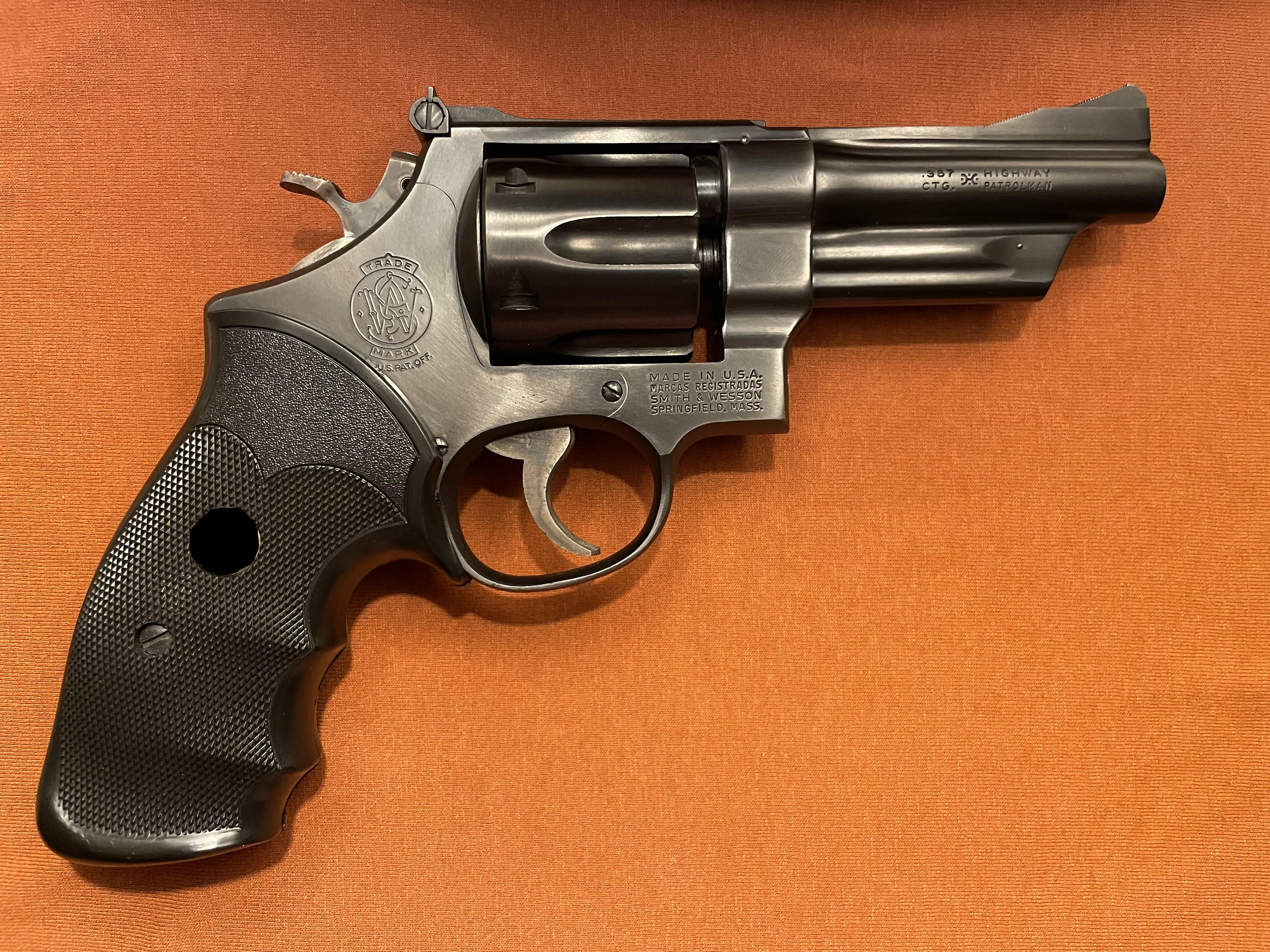
Showing stamped nomenclature on barrel unique to model 28

The Smith & Wesson (S&W) Model 28, also known as the Highway Patrolman, is an N-frame revolver chambered for the .357 Magnum cartridge, in production from 1954 to 1986. It is a high quality matte-finished bead blasted version of the S&W Model 27.

== Development ==
The Model 28, also known as the Highway Patrolman from 1954 to 1956, traces its heritage back to the Smith & Wesson Registered Magnum. The Registered Magnum was renamed the .357 Magnum (first production model completed April 8, 1935). The .357 Magnum was temporarily discontinued in December 1941 when S&W turned their focus to wartime production but was reintroduced in December 1948 with the new series beginning at serial number S72000 and incorporated an internal hammer block for prevention of accidental discharge if dropped.

Law enforcement agencies demanded the power of the .357 Magnum model 27 but its high-polish finish and labor-intensive topstrap checkering added expense with no added utility for use as a duty firearm. Additionally, the high polish finish of the 27 was prone to fingerprints and other handling smudges that were readily visible.

Eventually, departments and the general public requested a more affordable version of the model 27 and S&W responded with the development of the Highway Patrolman (later renamed the Model 28 in 1957). The manufacturing changes made for a more affordable revolver since the model 28 was not a super-high polished firearm. Instead, the 28 was semi-polished along with bead-blasted (non checkered) top strap and trigger guard which reduced production cost. The 28 is mechanically identical and robust to the model 27 and the same high quality materials were utilized. "Highway Patrolman" is engraved onto the barrel at the factory as well as the nomenclature ".357 CTG.". Although the model 28 top strap and frame rounds are bead blasted to achieve a matte appearance, the non-bead blasted surfaces do exhibit some luster.

== Engineering and production changes ==
Model	Year	Modifications
28	1957	Before 1957 produced as the Model 27
28-1	1960	Changed extractor rod, right hand to left hand thread
28-2	1961	Cylinder stop changed, eliminate trigger guard screw
28-2	1968	Delete diamond grip
28-2	1969	Change to N serial number
28-2	1982	Eliminate cylinder counterbore and pinned barrel, change to cylinder length to 1.57"
28-3	1986	Model 28 discontinued

== Users ==
- Italy: Used by the Gruppo di Intervento Speciale.
- Norway: Used by the Norwegian Police Service (Norwegian: Politi- og lensmannsetaten) in some municipalities.
- United States
  - Florida Highway Patrol
  - Georgia State Patrol
  - Idaho State Police (1955–1979) 4 inch barrel
  - Maine State Police (1977–1988)
  - New York State Police
  - San Francisco Police Department
  - Texas Department of Public Safety
  - U.S. Border Patrol
  - Washington State Patrol 6 inch 28-2
  - Wisconsin State Patrol

== See also ==
- List of firearms
