= William Bentsen =

American sailor (1930–2020)

Personal information
- Born: February 18, 1930 Chicago, Illinois, U.S.
- Died: December 25, 2020 (aged 90)
Medal record
Men's sailing
Representing the United States
Olympic Games
| Gold medal – first place | 1972 Munich | Soling |
| Bronze medal – third place | 1964 Tokyo | Flying Dutchman |
Pan American Games
| Gold medal – first place | 1967 Winnipeg | Flying Dutchman |

William "Bill" Bentsen (February 18, 1930 – December 25, 2020) was an American sailor and Olympic champion. Bentsen was born in Chicago, Illinois. He received a gold medal in the Soling class at the 1972 Summer Olympics in Munich. Bentsen was inducted into the National Sailing Hall of Fame in 2017.
