= Yasutoshi Tagami =

Japanese sailor

Personal information
- Nationality: Japanese
- Born: 15 February 1934 (age 91)

Sport
- Sport: Sailing

Yasutoshi Tagami (born 15 February 1934) is a Japanese sailor. He competed in the Flying Dutchman event at the 1964 Summer Olympics.
