= Feliciano Juntareal =

Filipino sailor

Personal information
- Nationality: Filipino
- Born: January 20, 1934 (age 92)

Sport
- Sport: Sailing

Feliciano Juntareal (born January 20, 1934) is a Filipino sailor. He competed in the Dragon event at the 1964 Summer Olympics.
