= Hans Mehren =

Norwegian sailor

Personal information
- Nationality: Norwegian
- Born: 24 January 1945 (age 80); Oslo, Norway

Sport
- Sport: Sailing

Hans Mehren (born 24 January 1945) is a Norwegian sailor. He competed in the Flying Dutchman event at the 1964 Summer Olympics.
