= Steven Henriques =

Jamaican sailor (born 1944)

Personal information
- Nationality: Jamaican
- Born: 2 June 1944 (age 81)

Sport
- Sport: Sailing

Steven Henriques (born 2 June 1944) is a Jamaican sailor. He competed at the 1964 Summer Olympics and the 1968 Summer Olympics.
