= Richard Deaver =

American sailor (born 1931)

Personal information
- Full name: Richard Burke Deaver
- Born: February 7, 1931 (age 95) Huntington Park, California, U.S.
Medal record
Men's sailing
Representing the United States
Olympic Games
Bronze medal – third place	1964 Tokyo	Dragon class

Richard Burke "Dick" Deaver (born February 7, 1931) is an American competitive sailor and Olympic medalist. He was born in Huntington Park, California. He won a bronze medal in the Dragon class at the 1964 Summer Olympics in Tokyo, together with Lowell North and Charles Rogers.
