= Peter Ahrendt =

German sailor (1934–2013)

Olympic medal record

Men's Sailing

Representing Germany
Silver medal – second place	1964 Tokyo	Dragon

Peter Ahrendt (2 February 1934 in Rostock – February 2013) was a German sailor who competed in the 1964 Summer Olympics.
