= Metin Akdurak =

Turkish sailor (born 1936)

Personal information
- Nationality: Turkey
- Born: 21 February 1936 (age 89)
- Height: 1.87 m (6 ft 2 in)
- Weight: 85 kg (187 lb)

Sport
- Sport: Sailing

Metin Akdurak (born 21 February 1936) is a Turkish sailor. He competed in the 1964 Summer Olympics.
