= Ulrich Mense =

East German sailor

Olympic medal record

Men's sailing

Representing Germany
| Silver medal – second place | 1964 Tokyo | Dragon |

Ulrich Mense (29 January 1927 in Rostock – 14 February 2003) was an East German sailor who competed in the 1964 Summer Olympics.
