= Wilfried Lorenz =

German sailor

Olympic medal record

Men's sailing

Representing Germany
Silver medal – second place	1964 Tokyo	Dragon

Wilfried Lorenz (born 18 January 1932) is a German sailor who competed in the 1964 Summer Olympics. He was born in Rostock.
