= List of aviation incidents involving terrorism =

Footage of American Airlines Flight 77 hitting the Pentagon

This is a list of aviation accidents and incidents that were caused by terrorism such as hijacking, bombing, or shoot down.

== 20th century ==
=== 1970s ===
==== JAT Flight 367 ====
On January 26, 1972, a Douglas DC-9 flying between Stockholm and Belgrade via Copenhagen and Zagreb crashed near Srbská Kamenice, Czechoslovakia after a bomb exploded at cruising altitude. The bomb was suspected to have been planted by Croatian nationalists. 27 of the 28 on board were killed, with the only survivor being flight attendant Vesna Vulović.

==== TWA Flight 841 (1974) ====
TWA Flight 841 (1974) On September 8, 1974, a Boeing 707-331B (registered N8734[1]) operating as TWA Flight 841 from Tel Aviv to New York City via Athens and Rome crashed into the Ionian Sea, killing all aboard. The National Transportation Safety Board determined that the plane had been destroyed by a bomb hidden in the cargo hold. The detonation of the bomb destroyed the systems responsible for operating the plane's control surfaces, causing the plane to pitch up until it stalled and dove into the sea.

==== Cubana de Aviación Flight 455 ====
Cubana de Aviación Flight 455 was a Cuban Douglas DC-8 flying from Barbados to Jamaica that was brought down on October 6, 1976, by a terrorist bomb attack occurring 11 minutes after takeoff. All 73 people on board the Douglas DC-8 aircraft were killed. Among the 25 crew members, the passengers comprised 57 Cubans – including the Cuban National Fencing team, and several government officials – 11 Guyanese, and 5 North Koreans – of which 4 Koreans were government officials.

Several CIA-linked anti-Castro Cuban exiles were implicated by the evidence.

=== 1980s ===
==== Gulf Air Flight 771 ====
On 23 September 1983, a Boeing 737 operating between Karachi and Abu Dhabi crashed in the desert near Jebel Ali, UAE after a bomb planted by the Abu Nidal Organization exploded. All on board were killed.

==== Air India Flight 182 ====
Air India Flight 182 was an Air India Boeing 747 operating on the Toronto–Montreal–London–Delhi-Mumbai route. On 23 June 1985 it was operated using Boeing 747-237B registered VT-EFO. It disintegrated in midair en route from Montreal to London, at an altitude of 31,000 feet (9,400 m) over the Atlantic Ocean, as a result of the explosion from a bomb planted by Babbar Khalsa International. The remnants of the airliner fell into the ocean approximately 120 miles (190 km) west-southwest of the southwest tip of Ireland, killing all aboard: 329 people, including 268 Canadian citizens, 27 British citizens and 24 Indian citizens. The bombing of Air India Flight 182 is the largest mass killing in Canadian history, the deadliest aviation accident in the history of Air India and was the deadliest act of aviation terrorism until the September 11 attacks in 2001.

Korean Air flight 858

Korean Air Flight 858 was an international passenger flight from Baghdad to Seoul with stopovers in Dubai and Bangkok. On the 29th of November 1987, the Boeing 707-3B5C registered as HL7406 exploded midair over the Andaman Sea while flying the route from Dubai to Bangkok. All 115 occupants died. It was concluded that Kim Jong-il ordered North Korean agents to bomb the airplane in order to disturb the oncoming 1988 Seoul Olympics.

==== Pan Am Flight 103 ====
Pan Am Flight 103 was a regularly scheduled Pan Am transatlantic flight from Frankfurt to Detroit via London and New York. On 21 December 1988, N739PA, the aircraft operating the transatlantic leg of the route was destroyed by a bomb, killing all 243 passengers and 16 crew in what became known as the Lockerbie bombing. Large sections of the aircraft crashed onto a residential street in Lockerbie, Scotland, killing 11 people on the ground. With a total of 270 people killed, it is the deadliest terror attack in the history of the United Kingdom.

=== 1990s ===
==== Philippine Airlines Flight 434 ====
On 11 December 1994, a bomb was planted on board a Philippine Airlines flight as a test run for the Bojinka plot. One passenger died. The Bojinka plot was discovered before it could be carried out.

==== Air France Flight 8969 ====
Air France Flight 8969 was an Air France Airbus A300 that was hijacked on 24 December 1994 by the Armed Islamic Group of Algeria (GIA) at Houari Boumediene Airport, Algiers, Algeria during the Algerian Civil War. The terrorists murdered three passengers and their intention was to blow up the plane over the Eiffel Tower in Paris. When the aircraft reached Marseille, the National Gendarmerie Intervention Group (GIGN), a counter-terror unit of the French National Gendarmerie, stormed the plane and killed all four hijackers.

== 21st Century ==
=== September 11 attacks ===
==== American Airlines Flight 11 ====
American Airlines Flight 11 was a domestic passenger flight that was hijacked by five al-Qaeda terrorists on September 11, 2001, as part of the September 11 attacks. Mohamed Atta deliberately crashed the plane into the North Tower of the World Trade Center in New York City, killing all 92 people aboard and an unknown number in the building's impact zone. The aircraft involved, a Boeing 767-223ER, registration N334AA, was flying American Airlines' daily scheduled morning transcontinental service from Logan International Airport in Boston, Massachusetts to Los Angeles International Airport in Los Angeles, California.

==== United Airlines Flight 175 ====
United Airlines Flight 175 was a scheduled domestic passenger flight from Logan International Airport, in Boston, Massachusetts, to Los Angeles International Airport, in Los Angeles, California. On September 11, 2001, the Boeing 767-200 operating the route was hijacked by five al-Qaeda terrorists and was deliberately crashed into the South Tower of the World Trade Center in New York City, killing all 65 people aboard and an unconfirmed number in the building's impact zone.

Approximately 30 minutes into the flight, the hijackers forcibly breached the cockpit and overpowered the pilot and first officer, allowing lead hijacker and trained pilot Marwan al-Shehhi to take over the controls. Unlike Flight 11, which turned its transponder off, the aircraft's transponder was visible on New York Center's radar, and the aircraft deviated from the assigned flight path for four minutes before air traffic controllers noticed these changes at 08:51 EDT. They made several unsuccessful attempts to contact the cockpit. Unknown to the hijackers, several passengers and crew aboard made phone calls from the plane to family members and provided information about the hijackers and injuries suffered by passengers and crew.

==== American Airlines Flight 77 ====
American Airlines Flight 77 was a scheduled American Airlines domestic transcontinental passenger flight from Dulles International Airport in Dulles, Virginia, to Los Angeles International Airport in Los Angeles, California. The Boeing 757-223 aircraft serving the flight was hijacked by five Saudi men affiliated with al-Qaeda on September 11, 2001, as part of the September 11 attacks. They deliberately crashed the plane into the Pentagon in Arlington County, Virginia, near Washington, D.C., killing all 64 people on board, including the five hijackers and six crew, as well as 125 people in the building.

Less than 35 minutes into the flight, the hijackers stormed the cockpit and forced the passengers, crew, and pilots to the rear of the aircraft. Hani Hanjour, one of the hijackers who was trained as a pilot, assumed control of the flight. Unknown to the hijackers, passengers aboard made telephone calls to friends and family and relayed information on the hijacking.

The hijackers crashed the aircraft into the western side of the Pentagon at 09:37 EDT. Many people witnessed the crash, and news sources began reporting on the incident within minutes. The impact severely damaged an area of the Pentagon and caused a large fire. A portion of the building collapsed; firefighters spent days working to fully extinguish the blaze. The damaged sections of the Pentagon were rebuilt in 2002, with occupants moving back into the completed areas that August. The 184 victims of the attack are memorialized in the Pentagon Memorial adjacent to the crash site. The 1.93-acre (7,800 m^{2}) park contains a bench for each of the victims, arranged according to their year of birth, ranging from 1930 to 1998.

==== United Airlines Flight 93 ====
United Airlines Flight 93 was a domestic scheduled passenger flight that was hijacked by four al-Qaeda terrorists on board, as part of the September 11 attacks. It crashed into a field in Somerset County, Pennsylvania, during an attempt by the passengers and crew to regain control of the aircraft. All 44 people on board were killed, including the four hijackers, but no one on the ground was injured. The aircraft involved, a Boeing 757-222, was flying United Airlines' daily scheduled morning flight from Newark International Airport in Newark, New Jersey to San Francisco International Airport in San Francisco, California.

The hijackers stormed the aircraft's cockpit 46 minutes after takeoff. The pilot and first officer took measures, such as de-activating the autopilot, to hinder the hijackers. Ziad Jarrah, who had trained as a pilot, took control of the aircraft and diverted it back toward the east coast, in the direction of Washington, D.C., the U.S. capital. Khalid Sheikh Mohammed and Ramzi bin al-Shibh, considered principal instigators of the attacks, have claimed that the intended target for Flight 93 was the U.S. Capitol Building.

=== 2004 Russian aircraft bombings ===
==== Volga-AviaExpress Flight 1353 ====
The first to crash was Volga-AviaExpress Flight 1353, a Tupolev Tu-134, registered RA-65080, which had been in service since 1977. The plane was flying from Moscow to Volgograd. It left Domodedovo International Airport at 22:30 on 24 August 2004. Communication with the plane was lost at 22:56 while it was flying over Tula Oblast, 180 km south-east of Moscow. The remains of the aircraft were found on the ground several hours later. Thirty-four passengers and 9 crew members were on board the plane. All of them died in the crash. The flight recorders were recovered from the crash site. The flight data recorder showed that the plane was cruising uneventfully at 8100 metres, before indicating some type of high energy event likely originating near the right hand side of the aircraft at seat row 19. Both recorders stopped recording within 2–3 seconds of this event. This was followed by the separation of the fuselage at that location an undetermined amount of time afterward.

==== Siberia Airlines Flight 1047 ====
Just minutes after the first crash, Siberia Airlines Flight 1047, which had left Domodedovo International Airport at 21:35 on 24 August 2004, disappeared from the radar screens and crashed. The Tu-154 aircraft, registered RA-85556, which had been in service since 1982, was flying from Moscow to Sochi. According to an unnamed government source of the Russian news agency Interfax, the plane had broadcast a hijack warning while flying over Rostov Oblast at 22:59. However, it was later determined that this was the aircraft's Emergency Locator Transmitter (ELT), and that the crew of flight 1047 were not aware of any danger prior to the aircraft disappearing from radar. The plane disappeared from radar screens shortly after that and crashed. 38 passengers and 8 crew members were on board the plane, all of whom died. The debris of the aircraft was found on the morning of 25 August 2004, 9 kilometres (5.6 mi) from the work settlement of Gluboky in Kamensky District of Rostov Oblast. The flight recorders were also recovered in this case; the flight data recorder along with wreckage analysis suggested an almost identical high-energy event to the one seen on flight 1353 took place near the right hand side of the aircraft at seat row 25, while the aircraft was cruising at 12100 metres. The blast resulted in a rapid decompression of the cabin, damage to the elevator and rudder controls, a substantial loss of electrical power, and severe damage to the fuselage and tail components. The ELT was triggered a half second after the event, either by a crew member or automatically. The data recorder stopped working shortly after the explosion, but the cockpit voice recorder continued recording until impact with the ground, during which most of the crew discussions were about the loss of cabin pressure and electrical systems. The crew were caught completely off guard by the event, and there is no evidence that the crew was aware of the detonation of an explosive device on board.

The two almost simultaneous crashes caused speculations about terrorism. President Vladimir Putin immediately ordered the Federal Security Service (FSB) to investigate the crashes. On 28 August 2004, the FSB had found traces of the explosive RDX in the remains of both planes. Itar-Tass news agency reported on 30 August 2004, "without a shadow of a doubt, the FSB security service said that "both airplanes were blown up as a result of a terrorist attack". A little known group called the Islambouli Brigades claimed responsibility; the truth of those claims remains uncertain.

== 2010s ==
=== Metrojet Flight 9268 ===
Metrojet Flight 9268 was an Airbus A321 that took off from Sharm El Sheikh International Airport, Egypt, to Pulkovo Airport in Saint Petersburg, Russia. About 23 minutes after takeoff at 6:13 EST (4:13 UTC) 31 October 2015, a bomb exploded in the aircraft, causing it to disintegrate in mid-air. All 217 passengers and 7 crew members died. On November 16, 2015, investigators found out that a bomb was placed on the aircraft. This accident has been attributed to terrorist bombing and is currently under criminal investigation.

=== Daallo Airlines Flight 159 ===
On 2 February 2016, 20 minutes after taking off from Mogadishu, Somalia, at 11:00 local time, en route to Djibouti City, at an altitude of about 14,000 ft (4,300 m), an explosion occurred aboard the aircraft, opening a hole in the fuselage behind the R2 door. It was reported that day that the explosion was most likely close to seats 15/16F, abeam the forward wing root and the fuel tanks. There were 74 passengers and 7 crew on board at the time of the incident. The bomber was killed by the blast, which was determined to have come from a rigged laptop. The aircraft was evacuated safely, and the bomber was the only fatality. Two passengers suffered injuries of unspecified degree, but survived.

== See also ==
- Timeline of airliner bombing attacks
- Japan Air Lines Flight 123
- Tenerife Airport Disaster
- Ground Proximity Warning System
- Japan Airlines Flight 115
- American Airlines Flight 587
- Korean Air Flight 801
- South African Airways Flight 295
