= Charles Rogers (sailor) =

American sailor (born 1937)

Personal information
- Full name: Charles Sinclair Rogers
- Born: June 1, 1937 (age 89) National City, California, U.S.
Medal record
Men's sailing
Representing the United States
Olympic Games
Bronze medal – third place	1964 Tokyo	Dragon class

Charles Sinclair "Charlie" Rogers (born June 1, 1937) is an American competitive sailor and Olympic medalist. He won a bronze medal in the Dragon class at the 1964 Summer Olympics in Tokyo, together with Lowell North and Richard Deaver.
