= Musto Skiff =

Single-handed sailing skiff that achieves speeds over 20 knots

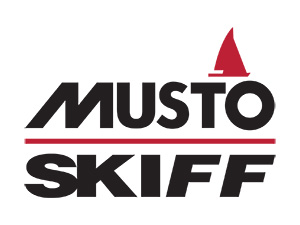
- Class symbol

Development
- Designer: Joachim Harpprecht
- Year: 1999
- Builder: Ovington Boats
- Name: Musto Skiff

Boat
- Crew: 1
- Trapeze: Yes

Hull
- Type: Monohull
- Hull weight: 44 kg (97 lb)
- LOA: 4.55 m (14 ft 11 in)
- Beam: 1.35 m (4 ft 5 in); 2.35 m (7 ft 9 in) (with racks)

Sails
- Mainsail area: 11.08 m^{2} (119.3 sq ft)
- Spinnaker area: 15.5 m^{2} (167 sq ft) (Spinnaker)

Racing
- D-PN: 80.0
- RYA PN: 847

The Musto Skiff is a single-handed sailing skiff with a length of 4.55 m (14 ft 11 in). It features a trapeze, asymmetrical spinnaker, wings and low weight and achieves speeds of over 20 knots (23 mph; 37 km/h), which makes it one of the fastest single-handed sailing boats.

== History ==
It was designed in 1999 for the 2000 Olympic Class trials in Quiberon by Joachim Harpprecht, where it won every race in the single-handed dinghy competition. Since then, the class has attained World Sailing international status and is sailed in 20 countries worldwide. It is built by Ovington Boats Ltd in England.

At the time of the design, the concept of a single-handed skiff was first met with scepticism by many observers, very similar to the initial reaction after the introduction of the 49er in 1996. The boat remains challenging to sail, and really shows its strengths when raced. World Championships occur annually and regularly usually attract in excess of 70 sailors from over 10 nations.

In 2016, the class association agreed to continue its branding as the 'Musto Skiff', in a naming rights deal with the Musto clothing company.

== Events ==
=== World Championship ===
Year	Gold	Silver	Bronze	Ref.
2007 Malcesine	Richard Stenhouse (GBR)	Ian Turnbull (GBR)	Ian Trotter (GBR)	
2008 St Moritz (SUI)	Richard Stenhouse (GBR)	Roger Oswald (SUI)	Graeme Oliver (GBR)	
2011 Black Rock	Daniel Henderson (GBR)	Bruce Keen (GBR)	Markus Hamilton (AUS)	
2012 Weymouth and Portland (GBR)	Bruce Keen (GBR)	Richard Stenhouse (GBR)	Tom Wright (GBR)	
2014 Perth (USA)	Jon Newman (AUS)	Marcus Hamilton (AUS)	Thor Schoenhoff (AUS)	
2015 Riva del Garda (ITA)	Bruce Keen (GBR)	Jon Newman (AUS)	Dan Trotter (GBR)	
2016 Carnac	Andi Lachenschmid (GER)	George Hand (GBR)	Dave Poston (GBR)	
2017 Palma (ESP)	Frithjof Schwerdt (GER)	Bruce Keen (GBR)	Andy Tarboton (RSA)	
2018 Blairgowrie (AUS)	Jon Newman (AUS)	Will Phillips (AUS)	Jamie Hilton (GBR)	
2019 Medemblik (NED)	Bruce Keen (GBR)	Jon Newman (AUS)	George Hand (GBR)	
2020 GER	Cancelled COVID-19			
2021 Garda (ITA)	Cancelled COVID-19			
2022 Kiel (GER)	Rick Peacock (GBR)	Andy Tarboton (RSA)	Peter Greenhalgh (GBR)	
