= John Dawe =

Australian sailor

Personal information
- Nationality: Australian
- Born: 14 January 1928
- Died: 26 August 2013 (aged 85)

Sport
- Sport: Sailing

John Dawe (14 January 1928 – 26 August 2013) was an Australian sailor. He competed in the Flying Dutchman event at the 1964 Summer Olympics.
