= Tony Morgan (sailor) =

British sailer (1931–2024)

- Born: 24 August 1931
- Died: 9 April 2024 (aged 92)

Olympic medal record

Men's Sailing

Representing Great Britain
Silver medal – second place	1964 Tokyo	Flying Dutchman

Arthur William Crawford Morgan (24 August 1931 – 9 April 2024), better known as Tony Morgan, was a British businessman and sailor who competed in the 1964 Summer Olympics.

== Life and career ==
Tony Morgan was born in Rochford, Essex on 24 August 1931. At the 1964 Olympics he sailed together with Keith Musto in the Flying Dutchman Lady C. They finished second in their class and were awarded silver.

Morgan and Musto won the European Flying Dutchman Championship in 1964 and finished second in 1966. Following their Olympic success Morgan and Musto were jointly named Yachtsman of the Year by the Yachting Journalists' Association in 1964. Morgan was a member of the Council of the Royal Yachting Association from 1968 to 1972 and a member of the British Olympic Yachting Appeal from 1970 to 1972.

Following his yachting career Morgan served as director and chairman in several venture capital trusts and renewable energy companies, such as Purle Bros, Redland, Morgan Hemingway, Wimpey Waste Management, Wistech, Re-Energy, and Octopus Investment. He was a member of the Board of Governors of the BBC from 1972 to 1977, as well a member of the Campaign for Social Democracy and the National Committee for Electoral Reform during the 1970s. From 1984 to 1989 he served as chairman of the Hunger Project Trust. In 1992 he was appointed Chief Executive of The Industrial Society, a post he held until 2000. He has been Chairman of the charity Youth at Risk since 1992.

Morgan died on 9 April 2024, at the age of 92.
