= Earle Wells =

New Zealand sailor (1933–2021)

Personal information
- Born: 27 October 1933 Auckland, New Zealand
- Died: 1 October 2021 (aged 87) Whakatāne, New Zealand
- Height: 185 cm (6 ft 1 in)
- Weight: 87 kg (192 lb)

Sailing career
- Sport: Sailing
Medal record
Men's sailing
Representing New Zealand
Olympic Games
Gold medal – first place	1964 Tokyo	Flying Dutchman

Earle Leonard Wells (27 October 1933 – 1 October 2021) was an Olympic gold medallist for New Zealand in yachting. With Helmer Pedersen, Wells won the Flying Dutchman class at the 1964 Summer Olympics in Tokyo.

Wells was born in Auckland in October 1933. He was also a rower, and his coxed four narrowly missed selection for the 1960 Summer Olympics.

He later raced in the Dragon class before taking up ocean racing and competed in 5 Sydney to Hobart Yacht Races. He helmed Condor.

Wells and Pedersen were inducted into the New Zealand Sports Hall of Fame in 1990.

Wells died on 1 October 2021, at the age of 87.
