= Musto (company) =

English clothing brand

- Genre: Clothing manufacturer
- Founded: 1964
- Founder: Keith Musto
- Headquarters: London, United Kingdom
- Revenue: £24m (2005)
- Owner: Canadian Tire
- Website: www.musto.com

Musto is a clothing brand based in England, with its headquarters at International House, St Katherine's Way, London E1W 1UN. The brand was established in 1964 by Keith Musto, a British Olympic sailor and engineer. Musto sells sailing clothes, equestrian clothing, shooting apparel and lifestyle outdoor clothing.

== History ==
Shop in Lymington, Hampshire

In 1979 Musto developed the first three-layer clothing system for sailors. In 1987 Keith Musto won the British Design Council Award for his ocean clothing. In 1989 Musto became the supplier to the RNLI for its offshore lifeboat crews.

In 2010 the company was granted royal warrants, naming them as official suppliers, from Queen Elizabeth and her husband.

It worked closely with equestrian Zara Phillips to launch a jointly designed equestrian clothing range named ZP176.

Musto sailing craft, 2009

In 2017, Musto was acquired by Norwegian outdoor clothing maker Helly Hansen, which was then acquired in 2018 by Canadian retailer Canadian Tire.

== Sponsorship ==
Musto has sponsored British sailor Ellen MacArthur since 1994. They sponsored the Vestas Sailrocket and Pete Goss and his crew on Spirit of Mystery. Musto were the title sponsor of the Musto Skiff. In equestrianism, they sponsor Zara Phillips,
