= Ian Winter =

Australian sailor

Personal information
- Nationality: Australian
- Born: 31 March 1941 (age 83)

Sport
- Sport: Sailing

Ian Winter (born 31 March 1941) is an Australian sailor. He competed in the Flying Dutchman event at the 1964 Summer Olympics.
