= Keith Musto =

British sailor and businessman (born 1936)

Medal record

Sailing

Representing Great Britain

Olympic Games
Silver medal – second place	1964 Tokyo	Flying Dutchman

Franklyn Keith Musto OBE (born 12 January 1936) is a British sailor and businessman. He competed at the 1964 Summer Olympics in Tokyo and won a silver medal in the Flying Dutchman class and was reserve in the Flying Dutchman class for the 1972 Summer Olympics in Munich.

Musto began sailing aged 15. After National Service, he began work with engineer Ken Pearce and began working on sailing masts and sails. He went on to become a leading dingy sailor winning national championships in five classes between 1955 and 1963. He competed at the 1964 Tokyo Olympics in the Flying Dutchman class and won a silver medal along with Tony Morgan.

After the Olympics he set up a sailmaking business, Musto & Hyde, along with Eddie Hyde in Rayleigh, Essex. Eventually he concentrated solely on sailing and outdoor clothing with his company Musto Clothing.

In 1973 he worked with the Japanese Olympic Sailing team.

As well as the Olympics, Musto won medals at the 1963 & 1969 World Championships again in the Flying Dutchman class and gained a bronze medal in 2008 Vintage Yachting Games Dragon class.

Musto was appointed Officer of the Order of the British Empire (OBE) in the 2014 New Year Honours for services to the economy through Musto Clothing.
