= Smith & Wesson Model 27 =

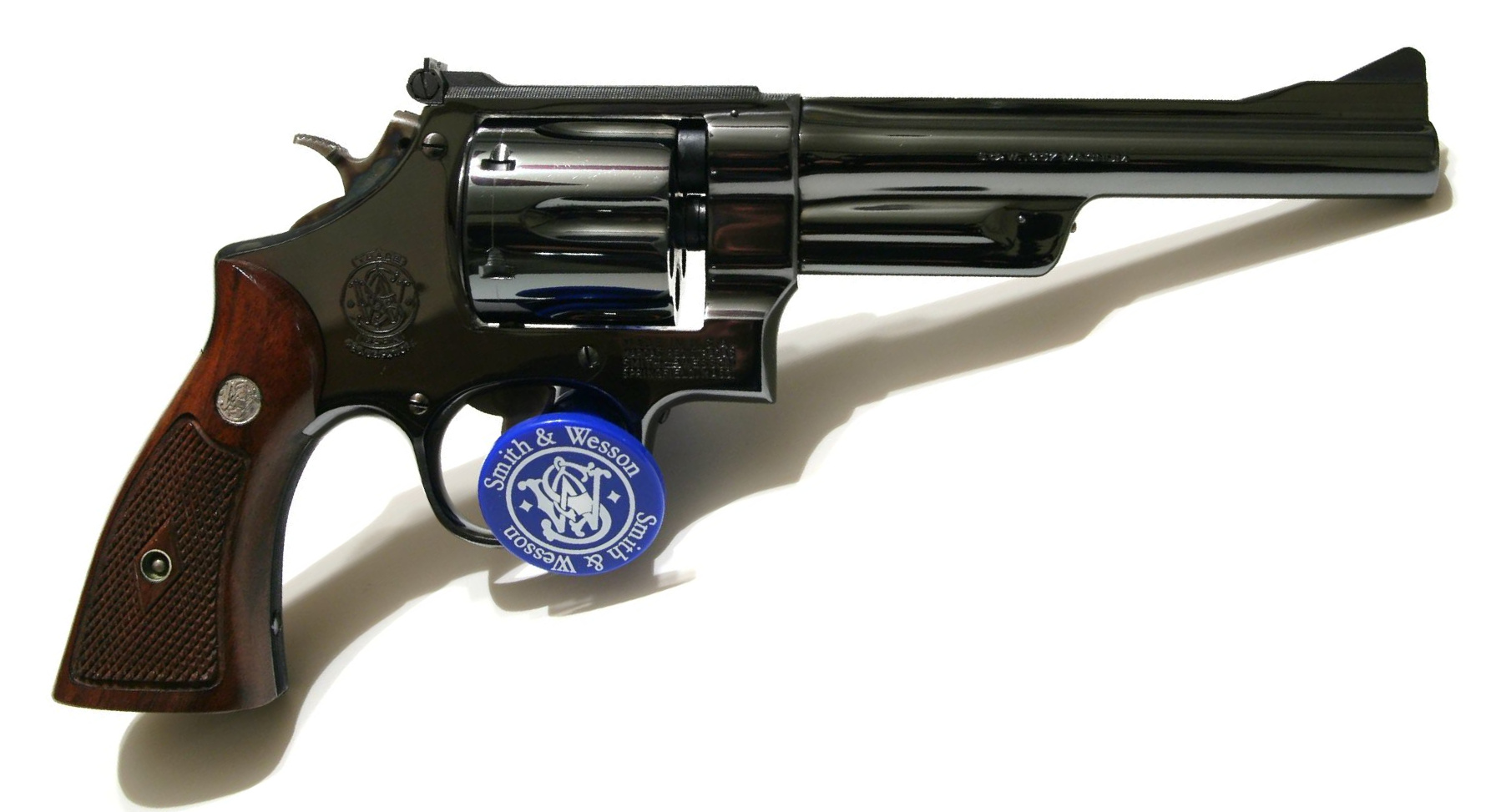
- Type: Revolver
- Place of origin: United States

Service history
- Wars: World War II

Production history
- Manufacturer: Smith & Wesson
- Produced: 1935–1994 (Original Model); 2008–present (Classic Model)
- Variants: Model 327 (scandium); Model 627 (stainless steel)

Specifications
- Barrel length: 3 1/2 in (89 mm); 4 in (102 mm); 5 in (127 mm); 6 in (153 mm); 6 1/2 in (165 mm); 8 3/8 in (214 mm); 8 3/4 in (222 mm); 10 5/8 in (270 mm)
- Cartridge: .357 Magnum
- Action: Double-action
- Feed system: Six-round cylinder
- Sights: Fixed front, adjustable rear

The Smith & Wesson Model 27 is a six-shot, double-action revolver chambered for the .357 Magnum cartridge and manufactured by the United States company Smith & Wesson. It was first produced in 1935, and many versions of it are still in production today. The Model 27 was built on S&W's carbon steel, large N-frame, had adjustable sights, and was available at various times with 3 1/2", 4", 5", 6", 6 1/2", 8 3/8", 8 3/4", or 10 5/8" barrel lengths.

== History ==
When first introduced by Smith & Wesson in 1935, it was known as the Registered Magnum. The model was essentially a custom-order revolver. Barrel lengths could be had in 1/4 inch (6.4 mm) increments from 3 1/2 to 8 3/4 inches (8.9 to 22.2 cm) inches in length. In addition to the different lengths of barrels available, there were different grips, front sights, triggers, hammers, and finishes available. Each Registered Magnum came with a certificate of authenticity.

Even though it was introduced in the middle of the Great Depression and was extremely expensive, Smith & Wesson found itself backlogged with orders for the four years that it produced the Registered Magnum. The Kansas City Police Department issued the Registered Magnum to its officers, and many other law enforcement officers across the United States carried the Registered Magnum. In 1939, Smith & Wesson stopped producing the Registered Magnum. It was replaced with a slightly less custom example (meaning fewer options available) and eventually was named the Model 27, when in 1957 S&W implemented their numbered naming protocol. This "pre-model 27" was available with barrel lengths of 3 1/2, 5, 6 1/2, and 8 3/4 inches (8.9, 12.7, 16.5, and 22.2 cm). It has been reported that these were the most popular barrel lengths for the Registered Magnum. Essentially, the Model 27 was still the Registered Magnum, but standardized for ease of production and economy. The Smith & Wesson Model 28 "Highway Patrolman" was introduced as a lower-cost version of the Model 27 in 1954, stripped of some of the features of the Model 27, such as polishing.

It was noted for its durability and reliability. The 3 1/2-inch barrel length was extremely popular with FBI agents from the 1940s through the 1970s. Skeeter Skelton considered the Model 27 with a 5-inch barrel as the best all-around handgun. General George Patton carried an ivory-handled Registered Magnum with a 3 1/2-inch barrel (along with his ivory-handled Colt Peacemaker); Patton called the Model 27 his "killing gun".

== Engineering and production changes ==
Model	Year	Modifications
.357 Magnum	Pre-1957	Before 1957 produced as the .357 Magnum
27	1957	Stamping of model number continued as the Model 27
27-1	1960	Changed extractor rod, right hand to left hand thread
27-2	1961	Cylinder stop changed, eliminated trigger guard screw
27-2	1967	6½ barrel discontinued
27-2	1968	Delete diamond grip
27-2	1969	Changed to N serial prefix
27-2	1975	Target trigger, target hammer, patridge front sight on 6" and 8-3/8" barrel, introduced with Goncalo Alves target stock and case
27-2	1979	3½" and 5" barrel discontinued, 4" introduced with red ramp front sight and white outline rear sight
27-2	1980	Target stocks standard
27-3	1982	Eliminate cylinder counterbore and pinned barrel, change in cylinder length to 1.57"
27-3	1986	Discontinue nickel finish
27-4	1988	New yoke retention system / stud radius package / floating hand
27-5	1990	Longer stop notch in cylinder
27-5	1992	Discontinue 4" and 8-3/8" barrel
27-6	1993	Hogue Grips, drill and tap frame, change rear leaf sight, change extractor
27-6	1994	Model 27 Discontinued
27-7	2000	Performance Center Version 8 shot, built on N frame with floating firing pin and extended frame lug
27-8	2008	Reintroduced as the Model 27 Classic

== Variants ==
Smith & Wesson Model 27-2 6"
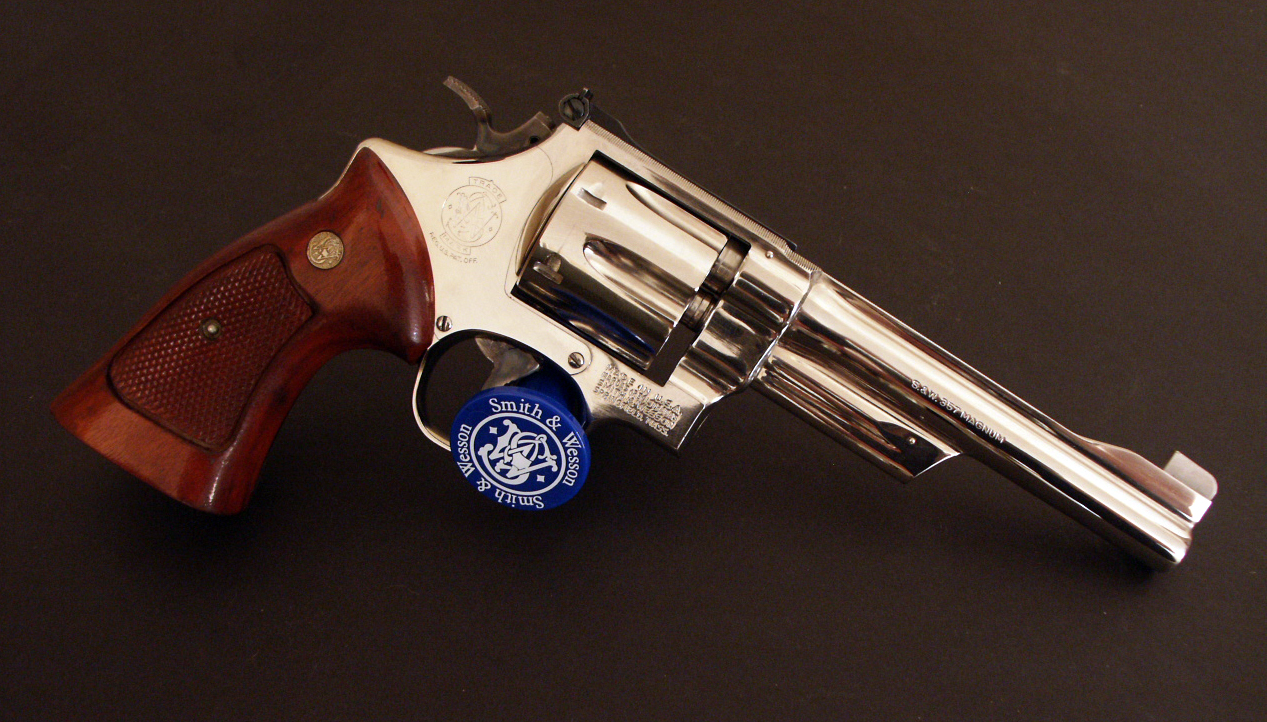
- Type: Revolver
- Place of origin: United States

Production history
- Manufacturer: Smith & Wesson Performance Center

Specifications
- Mass: 37.6 ounces (1.07 kg)
- Length: 10.5 inches (27 cm)
- Barrel length: 6 inches (15 cm)
- Cartridge: .357 Magnum
- Action: Double action
- Feed system: 6-shot cylinder
- Sights: Dovetail Red Ramp front sight Outline White rear sight

The stainless steel Model 627 was introduced in 1989 as the "Model of 1989". It featured a 5 1/2-inch barrel, a 6-shot unfluted cylinder, and had a round butt with S&W Combat stocks.

In 1996, the Smith & Wesson Performance Center began production of an 8-shot 627. The 627 has a 2 5/8-inch (6.7 cm) barrel with no muzzle brake or ports. The cylinder is unfluted. The revolver is made of stainless steel, with a matte finish and wood grips.

=== Model 327 ===
In 2008, the eight-shot, scandium-framed Smith & Wesson Model 327 was introduced. A variant of the 327, the 327NG, is part of the NightGuard line.

The Smith & Wesson Model 327PD is an eight-shot double-action revolver that has a 4-inch stainless steel barrel with no muzzle brake or ports. It has a scandium alloy frame and a titanium cylinder. It comes with rosewood Hogue grips. It uses a light-gathering HI-VIZ front sight and an adjustable V-notch rear sight. The revolver finish is a glare-reducing matte black, with a matte gray cylinder.

Smith and Wesson 327 R8 .357 Mag

The S&W TRR8 and M&P R8 (both including accessory rails for mounting lights and lasers) are recent advances of the 327 line.

== Current production ==
Smith & Wesson now include the Model 27 in two variations in their current "Classics" Line of Revolvers. Both feature original style wooden combat grips per the post WW2 versions of the 27 and later 586 and 686 revolvers. Barrels are currently available in 4" and 6 1/2"; both feature adjustable sights. The 4" version has a pinned serrated ramp—style front sight, the 6 1/2" version has a traditional target Patridge-style front sight that is also pinned to the barrel.
