= Eduardo de Queiroz =

Portuguese sailor

Eduardo Pedro Brandão de Melo de Magalhães Guedes de Queiroz (born 29 July 1936) is a Portuguese former sailor who competed in the 1964 Summer Olympics.
