= Lars Käll =

Swedish sailor

Personal information
- Nationality: Swedish
- Born: 19 November 1933; Stockholm, Sweden
- Died: 27 July 2009 (aged 75); Stockholm, Sweden

Sport
- Sport: Sailing

Lars Käll (19 November 1933 – 27 July 2009) was a Swedish sailor. He competed in the Flying Dutchman event at the 1964 Summer Olympics.
