= Helmer Pedersen =

New Zealand sailor

Personal information
- Born: Helmer Orlaf Leif Pedersen; 28 March 1930 Copenhagen, Denmark
- Died: 24 August 1987 (aged 57)
- Height: 180 cm (5 ft 11 in)
- Weight: 80 kg (180 lb)

Sport
- Sport: Sailing
- Club: Otahuhu Sailing Club
Medal record
Men's Sailing
Representing New Zealand
Olympic Games
Gold medal – first place	1964 Tokyo	Flying Dutchman class

Helmer Orlaf Leif Pedersen (28 March 1930 in Copenhagen, Denmark – 24 August 1987) was an Olympic gold medallist for New Zealand in yachting. With Earle Wells, Pedersen won the Flying Dutchman class at the 1964 Summer Olympics in Tokyo. Pedersen had previously been the reserve for the same class at the 1960 Summer Olympics in Rome.

In his home country of Denmark he had been mainly a Finn class yachtsman. He did not make any Danish Olympic team due to the presence of the great Paul Elvstrøm, although he was a reserve for Denmark at the 1952 Summer Olympics in Finland.

He died in 1987 from lung cancer after having been a heavy smoker. He was retrospectively inducted into the New Zealand Sports Hall of Fame in 1990.
