= Jesús Villareal =

Filipino sailor

Personal information
- Full name: Jesús Maria Villareal
- Nationality: Filipino
- Born: 2 November 1928 Manila, Philippines

Sport
- Sport: Sailing

Jesús Maria Villareal (born 2 November 1928) is a Filipino sailor. He competed at the 1960 Summer Olympics, the 1964 Summer Olympics and the 1976 Summer Olympics.
