= Fausto Preysler =

Filipino sailor

Personal information
- Nationality: Filipino
- Born: February 14, 1914 Hagonoy, Bulacan, Philippine Islands
- Died: before 2007
- Height: 5 ft 9 in (174 cm)
- Weight: 139 lb (63 kg)

Sport
- Sport: Sailing

Fausto Preysler Perez de Tagle (born February 14, 1914, died before 2007) was a Filipino sailor. He competed at the 1960 Summer Olympics and the 1964 Summer Olympics.
