= Denmark at the 1972 Summer Olympics =

- IOC code: DEN
- NOC: Danish Olympic Committee

in Munich
- Competitors: 126 (114 men and 12 women) in 17 sports
- Flag bearer: Peder Pedersen
- Medals Ranked 25th: Gold 1 Silver 0 Bronze 0 Total 1

Summer Olympics appearances (overview)
- 1896; 1900; 1904; 1908; 1912; 1920; 1924; 1928; 1932; 1936; 1948; 1952; 1956; 1960; 1964; 1968; 1972; 1976; 1980; 1984; 1988; 1992; 1996; 2000; 2004; 2008; 2012; 2016; 2020; 2024

Other related appearances
- 1906 Intercalated Games

Denmark competed at the 1972 Summer Olympics in Munich, West Germany. 126 competitors, 114 men and 12 women, took part in 74 events in 17 sports.

== Medalists ==
=== Gold ===
- Niels Fredborg — Cycling, Men's 1000 metres time trial

== Archery ==
Denmark entered two men and two women in the first modern archery competition at the Olympics. Their highest placing competitor was Arne Jacobsen, at 8th place in the men's competition.

Women's Individual Competition:

- Erna Rahbek Pedersen – 2244 points (→ 26th place)
- Lilli Lentz – 2218 points (→ 29th place)

Men's Individual Competition:

- Arne Jacobsen – 2423 points (→ 8th place)
- Herluf Andersen – 2394 points (→ 13th place)

== Athletics ==
Men's 1500 metres

- Tom B. Hansen
  - Heat — 3:41.1
  - Semifinals — 3:41.6
  - Final — 3:46.4 (→ 10th place)
- Gerd Larsen
  - Heat — 3:44.7
  - Semifinals — 3:59.4 (→ did not advance)

Men's 5000 metres

- Jørn Lauenbourg
  - Heat — 14:18.8 (→ did not advance)
- Gert Kaerulin
  - Heat — 14:39.2 (→ did not advance)

== Boxing ==
Men's Lightweight (– 60 kg)

- Erik Madsen
  - First Round — Bye
  - Second Round — Lost to Charlie Nash (IRL), 0:5

Men's Welterweight (– 67 kg)

- Ib Bøtcher
  - First Round — Defeated Nicolas Ortiz Flores (PUR), 3:2
  - Second Round — Lost to John Rodgers (IRL), TKO-3

Men's Middleweight (– 75 kg)

- Poul Knudsen
  - First Round — Bye
  - Second Round — Defeated William Peets (ISV), 5:0
  - Quarterfinals — Lost to Prince Amartey (GHA), 2:3

== Cycling ==
Thirteen cyclists represented Denmark in 1972.

Individual road race

- Jørgen Marcussen — 21st place
- Ove Jensen — 28th place
- Henning Jørgensen — 48th place
- Eigil Sørensen — did not finish (→ no ranking)

Team time trial

- Jørgen Emil Hansen
- Junker Jørgensen
- Jørn Lund
- Jørgen Marcussen

Sprint

- Niels Fredborg
- Peder Pedersen

1000m time trial

- Niels Fredborg
  - Final — 1:06.44 (→ Gold Medal)

Individual pursuit

- Reno Olsen

Team pursuit

- Gunnar Asmussen
- Svend Erik Bjerg
- Reno Olsen
- Bent Pedersen

== Fencing ==
Six fencers, five men and one woman, represented Denmark in 1972.

Men's épée

- Reinhard Münster
- Peter Askjær-Friis
- Ivan Kemnitz

Men's team épée

- Torben Bjerre-Poulsen, Peter Askjær-Friis, Ivan Kemnitz, Reinhard Münster, Jørgen Thorup

Women's foil

- Annie Madsen

== Football ==
Men's Team Competition

- First Round (Group C)
  - Defeated Brazil (3–2)
  - Defeated Iran (4–0)
  - Lost to Hungary (0–2)
- Second Round (Group 2)
  - Drew with Poland (1-1)
  - Defeated Morocco (3–1)
  - Lost to Soviet Union (0–4) → did not advance, 5th place over-all
- Team Roster
  - Flemming Ahlberg, BK Frem
  - Svend Andresen, B 1903
  - Keld Bak, Næstved IF
  - Hans Ewald Hansen, B 1901
  - Heino Hansen, Slagelse B&I
  - Jack Hansen, B 1913
  - Heinz Hildebrandt, Hvidovre IF
  - Kristen Nygaard, Fuglebakken Aarhus
  - Flemming Pedersen, KB
  - Leif Printzlau, BK Frem
  - Jørgen Rasmussen, Randers Freja
  - Max Rasmussen, AB
  - Per Røntved, Brønshøj BK
  - Allan Simonsen, Vejle BK
  - Mogens Therkildsen, Odense BK (goalkeeper)
  - Steen Ziegler, Hvidovre IF
  - Reserve: Kurt Berthelsen, Aalborg BK
  - Reserve: Valdemar Hansen, BK Frem (goalkeeper)
  - Reserve: Helge Vonsyld, Randers Freja
- Head Coach: Rudi Strittich

== Handball ==
Men's Team Competition

- Preliminary Round (Group A)
  - Drew with the Soviet Union (12-12)
  - Lost to Poland (8–11)
  - Lost to Sweden (10–16)
- Final Round
  - Defeated Tunisia (29–21)
  - Defeated United States (19–18) → 13th place
- Team Roster
  - Arne Andersen
  - Keld Jul Andersen
  - Jørgen Frandsen
  - Claus Jørgen From
  - Flemming Hansen
  - Jørgen Heidemann
  - Søren Jensen
  - Bent Jørgensen
  - Kay Sloth Jørgensen
  - Flemming Lauritzen
  - Svend Otto Lund
  - Tom Benny Lund
  - Thor Munkager
  - Vagn Harris Nielsen
  - Karsten Steen Sørensen
  - Jørgen Vodsgaard

== Modern pentathlon ==
Three male pentathletes represented Denmark in 1972.

Men's Individual Competition

- Jørn Steffensen – 4887 points (→ 14th place)
- Klaus Petersen – 4492 points (→ 37th place)
- René Heitmann – 4190 points (→ 52nd place)

Men's Team Competition

- Steffensen, Petersen, and Heitmann – 13547 points (→ 14th place)

== Rowing ==
Men's Single Sculls

- Kim Børgesen
  - Heat — 7:58.94
  - Repechage — 7:56.66
  - Semi Finals — 8:27.93
  - B-Final — 8:09.04 (→ 11th place)

== Sailing ==
Open

Athlete	Event	Race							Net points	Final rank
Athlete	Event	1	2	3	4	5	6	7	Net points	Final rank
Steen Kjøhede	Finn	16	~~DSQ~~	3	17	14	DNF	25	136.7	19
Hans Fogh; Ulrik Brock	Flying Dutchman	4	12	9	6	6	5	~~16~~	74.4	7
Mogens Larsen; Klaus Føge Jensen	Tempest	11	13	20	12	14	15	~~DSQ~~	121.0	17
Paul Elvstrøm; Valdemar Bandolowski; Jan Kjærulff	Soling	7	17	1	6	~~DSQ~~	DNS	—N/a	79.7	13
Poul Richard Høj Jensen; Frank Høj Jensen; Gunnar Dahlgaard	Dragon	17	~~19~~	9	11	5	2	—N/a	68.0	7

== Shooting ==
Seven male shooters represented Denmark in 1972.

25 m pistol

- Lennart Christensen

300 m rifle, three positions

- Vagn Andersen
- Per Weichel

50 m rifle, three positions

- Henning Clausen
- Per Weichel

50 m rifle, prone

- Henning Clausen
- Vagn Andersen

Trap

- Egon Hansen

Skeet

- Niels-Ove Mikkelsen
- Ole Justesen

== Swimming ==
Men's 100m Backstroke

- Ejvind Pedersen
- Lars Børgesen

Men's 200m Backstroke

- Ejvind Pedersen
- Lars Børgesen

Men's 100m Breaststroke

- Karl Christian Koch

Men's 200m Breaststroke

- Karl Christian Koch

Women's 100m Freestyle

- Kirsten Strange-Campbell

Women's 400m Freestyle

- Kirsten Knudsen

Women's 800m Freestyle

- Kirsten Knudsen

Women's 100m Breaststroke

- Winnie Nielsen

Women's 200m Breaststroke

- Winnie Nielsen

Women's 200m Individual Medley

- Kirsten Strange-Campbell

Women's 400m Individual Medley

- Kirsten Strange-Campbell
