= Denmark national football team results (1970–1979) =

This is a list of Association football games played by the Denmark national football team between 1970 and 1979. During the 1970s, the Danish national team played 97 games, winning 35, drawing 19, and losing 43. In these games, they scored 140 goals, while conceding 152 to their opponents. The first game of the 1970s was the May 9, 1970, game against Poland, the 325th overall Danish national team game. The last game of the 1970s was the November 14, 1979, game against Spain, the 421st game of the Danish national team.

== Key ==
- ECQ – European Championship Qualifying match
- F – Friendly match
- NC - Nordic Football Championship match
- OG - Olympic Games match
- OGQ - Olympic Games Qualifying match
- WCQ – World Cup Qualifying match

== Games ==
Note that scores are written Denmark first

| # | Date | Venue | Opponents | Score | Comp | Denmark scorers |
|---|---|---|---|---|---|---|
| 325 | 1970-05-09 | Idrætsparken, Copenhagen (H) | Poland | 0-2 | F | |
| 326 | 1970-06-03 | Olympiastadion, Helsinki (A) | Finland | 1-1 | NC | Keld Pedersen |
| 327 | 1970-06-25 | Nya Ullevi, Gothenburg (A) | Sweden | 1-1 | NC | Keld Pedersen |
| 328 | 1970-07-07 | Laurgardalsvöllur, Reykjavík (A) | Iceland | 0-0 | F | |
| 329 | 1970-09-02 | Warsaw (A) | Poland | 0-5 | F | |
| 330 | 1970-09-23 | Idrætsparken, Copenhagen (H) | Norway | 0-1 | NC | |
| 331 | 1970-10-14 | Idrætsparken, Copenhagen (H) | Portugal | 0-1 | ECQ | |
| 332 | 1970-11-11 | Hampden Park, Glasgow (A) | Scotland | 0-1 | ECQ | |
| 333 | 1970-11-25 | Olympiastadion, Bruges (A) | Belgium | 0-2 | ECQ | |
| 334 | 1971-04-21 | Stade de Copet, Vevey (A) | Switzerland | 1-2 | OGQ | Kristen Nygaard |
| 335 | 1971-05-05 | Idrætsparken, Copenhagen (H) | Switzerland | 4-0 | OGQ | Arne Toft (pen), Morten Olsen, Benny Nielsen, Bent Outzen |
| 336 | 1971-05-12 | Estadio das Antas, Porto (A) | Portugal | 0-5 | ECQ | |
| 337 | 1971-05-26 | Idrætsparken, Copenhagen (H) | Belgium | 1-2 | ECQ | Kresten Bjerre |
| 338 | 1971-06-09 | Idrætsparken, Copenhagen (H) | Scotland | 1-0 | ECQ | Finn Laudrup |
| 339 | 1971-06-20 | Idrætsparken, Copenhagen (H) | Sweden | 1-3 | NC | Kresten Bjerre |
| 340 | 1971-06-30 | Idrætsparken, Copenhagen (H) | Germany | 1-3 | F | Kresten Bjerre |
| 341 | 1971-07-28 | Idrætsparken, Copenhagen (H) | Japan | 3-2 | F | Iver Schriver, Kristen Nygaard, Ole Forsing |
| 342 | 1971-08-01 | Aalborg Stadion, Aalborg (H) | England | 3-2 | F | Iver Schriver, Morten Olsen, Kristen Nygaard |
| 343 | 1971-08-25 | Flensburg (A) | Germany | 3-1 | F | Iver Schriver (2), Sten Ziegler |
| 344 | 1971-09-08 | Idrætsparken, Copenhagen (H) | Finland | 0-0 | NC | |
| 345 | 1971-09-26 | Ullevaal, Oslo (A) | Norway | 4-1 | NC | Iver Schriver (2), Kristen Nygaard, Jørgen Markussen |
| 346 | 1971-10-10 | Idrætsparken, Copenhagen (H) | Romania | 2-1 | OGQ | own goal (Alexandru Boc), Birger Pedersen |
| 347 | 1972-04-18 | Idrætsparken, Copenhagen (H) | Germany | 0-1 | F | |
| 348 | 1972-05-03 | Idrætsparken, Copenhagen (H) | England | 1-2 | F | Per Røntved |
| 349 | 1972-05-21 | August 23, Bucharest (A) | Romania | 3-2 | OGQ | Per Røntved, Peter Johansson, Henning Jensen |
| 350 | 1972-06-07 | Idrætsparken, Copenhagen (H) | Finland | 3-0 | NC | Jørgen Kristensen (2), Kresten Bjerre |
| 351 | 1972-06-29 | Malmö Stadion, Malmö (A) | Sweden | 0-2 | NC | |
| 352 | 1972-07-03 | Idrætsparken, Copenhagen (H) | Iceland | 5-2 | F | Jack Hansen, Allan Simonsen (2), Keld Bak, Heino Hansen |
| 353 | 1972-08-16 | Idrætsparken, Copenhagen (H) | Mexico | 3-0 | F | Kristen Nygaard (3, 1 pen) |
| 354 | 1972-08-27 | Drei Flüsse Stadion, Passau (N) | Brazil | 3-2 | OG | Allan Simonsen (2), Per Røntved |
| 355 | 1972-08-29 | Rosenau Stadion, Augsburg (N) | Iran | 4-0 | OG | Heino Hansen (2), Allan Simonsen, Kristen Nygaard (pen) |
| 356 | 1972-08-31 | Rosenau Stadion, Augsburg (N) | Hungary | 0-2 | OG | |
| 357 | 1972-09-03 | Regensburg (N) | Poland | 1-1 | OG | Heino Hansen |
| 358 | 1972-09-04 | Drei Flüsse Stadion, Passau (N) | Morocco | 3-1 | OG | Keld Bak (2), Leif Printzlau |
| 359 | 1972-09-08 | Rosenau Stadion, Augsburg (N) | USSR | 0-4 | OG | |
| 360 | 1972-10-04 | Idrætsparken, Copenhagen (H) | Switzerland | 1-1 | F | John Steen Olsen |
| 361 | 1972-10-18 | Idrætsparken, Copenhagen (H) | Scotland | 1-4 | WCQ | Finn Laudrup |
| 362 | 1972-11-15 | Hampden Park, Glasgow (A) | Scotland | 0-2 | WCQ | |
| 363 | 1973-04-26 | Idrætsparken, Copenhagen (H) | Sweden | 1-2 | F | Peter Dahl |
| 364 | 1973-05-02 | Idrætsparken, Copenhagen (H) | Czechoslovakia | 1-1 | WCQ | Ole Bjørnmose |
| 365 | 1973-06-06 | Strahov, Prague (A) | Czechoslovakia | 0-6 | WCQ | |
| 366 | 1973-06-21 | Idrætsparken, Copenhagen (H) | Norway | 1-0 | NC | Peter Dahl |
| 367 | 1973-09-23 | Lerkendal Stadion, Trondheim (A) | Norway | 1-0 | NC | Hans Ewald Hansen |
| 368 | 1973-10-13 | Idrætsparken, Copenhagen (H) | Hungary | 2-2 | F | Henning Jensen, Kurt Stendal |
| 369 | 1973-11-21 | Parc des Princes, Paris (A) | France | 0-3 | F | |
| 370 | 1974-03-06 | Stade Général Eyadema, Lomé (A) | Togo | 2-0 | F | Bjarne Pettersson (2) |
| 371 | 1974-03-10 | Stade de l'Amitie, Cotonou (A) | Benin | 0-2 | F | |
| 372 | 1974-06-03 | Idrætsparken, Copenhagen (H) | Sweden | 0-2 | NC | |
| 373 | 1974-06-06 | Raatti Stadion, Oulu (A) | Finland | 1-1 | NC | Bjarne Pettersson |
| 374 | 1974-09-03 | Idrætsparken, Copenhagen (H) | Indonesia | 9-0 | F | Niels-Christian Holmstrøm (3), Henning Jensen (3), Kristen Nygaard (pen), Allan Simonsen, Niels Sørensen |
| 375 | 1974-09-25 | Idrætsparken, Copenhagen (H) | Spain | 1-2 | ECQ | Kristen Nygaard (pen) |
| 376 | 1974-10-09 | Aalborg Stadion, Aalborg (H) | Iceland | 2-1 | F | Flemming Lund, Ulrik le Fevre |
| 377 | 1974-10-13 | Idrætsparken, Copenhagen (H) | Romania | 0-0 | ECQ | |
| 378 | 1975-05-11 | August 23, Bucharest (A) | Romania | 1-6 | ECQ | Peter Dahl |
| 379 | 1975-06-04 | August 23, Bucharest (A) | Romania | 0-4 | OGQ | |
| 380 | 1975-06-18 | Idrætsparken, Copenhagen (H) | Romania | 2-1 | OGQ | Birger Mauritzen |
| 381 | 1975-06-25 | Idrætsparken, Copenhagen (H) | Finland | 2-0 | NC | Ole Bjørnmose, own goal (?) |
| 382 | 1975-09-03 | Idrætsparken, Copenhagen (H) | Scotland | 0-1 | ECQ | |
| 383 | 1975-09-25 | Malmö Stadion, Malmö (A) | Sweden | 0-0 | NC | |
| 384 | 1975-10-12 | Estadio Sarriá, Barcelona (A) | Spain | 0-2 | ECQ | |
| 385 | 1975-10-29 | Hampden Park, Glasgow (A) | Scotland | 1-3 | ECQ | Lars Bastrup |
| 386 | 1976-02-04 | Ramat Gan Stadium, Ramat Gan (A) | Israel | 1-0 | F | Mogens Hansen |
| 387 | 1976-05-11 | Nya Ullevi, Gothenburg (A) | Sweden | 2-1 | F | Lars Bastrup, Ove Flindt Bjerg |
| 388 | 1976-05-23 | Tsirion, Limassol (A) | Cyprus | 5-1 | WCQ | Allan Simonsen, Niels Tune, Ole Rasmussen, Lars Bastrup (2) |
| 389 | 1976-06-24 | Brann Stadion, Bergen (A) | Norway | 0-0 | NC | |
| 390 | 1976-08-25 | Vejle Stadion, Vejle (H) | Norway | 3-0 | NC | Per Røntved (pen), Kurt Hansen, Heino Hansen |
| 391 | 1976-09-01 | Idrætsparken, Copenhagen (H) | France | 1-1 | F | Per Røntved |
| 392 | 1976-09-22 | Idrætsparken, Copenhagen (H) | Italy | 0-1 | F | |
| 393 | 1976-10-27 | Idrætsparken, Copenhagen (H) | Cyprus | 5-0 | WCQ | Benny Nielsen, Henning Jensen (2, 1 pen), Per Røntved (pen), Jørgen Kristensen |
| 394 | 1976-11-17 | Estádio da Luz, Lisbon (A) | Portugal | 0-1 | WCQ | |
| 395 | 1977-01-30 | Box Bar Stadium, Banjul (A) | Gambia | 4-1 | F | Johnny Hansen, Jan Sørensen (pen), Allan Hansen, Gert Jørgensen |
| 396 | 1977-02-02 | Kaolack (A) | Senegal | 3-2 | F | Svend Erik Christensen, Gert Jørgensen, Klaus Nørregaard |
| 397 | 1977-04-13 | Vasil Levski National Stadium, Sofia (A) | Bulgaria | 1-3 | F | Jan Sørensen |
| 398 | 1977-05-01 | Idrætsparken, Copenhagen (H) | Poland | 1-2 | WCQ | Allan Simonsen |
| 399 | 1977-06-01 | Ullevaal, Oslo (A) | Norway | 2-0 | F | Flemming Lund, Jan Sørensen |
| 400 | 1977-06-15 | Idrætsparken, Copenhagen (H) | Sweden | 2-1 | NC | Per Røntved, Allan Simonsen |
| 401 | 1977-06-22 | Olympiastadion, Helsinki (A) | Finland | 2-1 | NC | Preben Elkjær (2) |
| 402 | 1977-09-21 | Silesia Stadium, Katowice (A) | Poland | 1-4 | WCQ | Kristen Nygaard (pen) |
| 403 | 1977-10-05 | Malmö Stadion, Malmö (A) | Sweden | 0-1 | F | |
| 404 | 1977-10-09 | Idrætsparken, Copenhagen (H) | Portugal | 2-4 | WCQ | Per Røntved (pen), Allan Hansen |
| 405 | 1978-02-08 | Ramat Gan Stadium, Ramat Gan (A) | Israel | 0-2 | F | |
| 406 | 1978-05-24 | Idrætsparken, Copenhagen (H) | Republic of Ireland | 3-3 | ECQ | Henning Jensen, Benny Nielsen (pen), Søren Lerby |
| 407 | 1978-05-31 | Ullevaal, Oslo (A) | Norway | 2-1 | NC | Frank Arnesen, Preben Elkjær |
| 408 | 1978-06-28 | Laurgardalsvöllur, Reykjavík (A) | Iceland | 0-0 | F | |
| 409 | 1978-08-16 | Idrætsparken, Copenhagen (H) | Sweden | 2-1 | NC | Benny Nielsen (pen), Per Røntved |
| 410 | 1978-09-20 | Idrætsparken, Copenhagen (H) | England | 3-4 | ECQ | Allan Simonsen (pen), Frank Arnesen, Per Røntved |
| 411 | 1978-10-11 | Idrætsparken, Copenhagen (H) | Bulgaria | 2-2 | ECQ | Benny Nielsen, Søren Lerby |
| 412 | 1978-10-25 | Windsor Park, Belfast (A) | Northern Ireland | 1-2 | ECQ | Henning Jensen |
| 413 | 1979-05-02 | Lansdowne Road, Dublin (A) | Republic of Ireland | 0-2 | ECQ | |
| 414 | 1979-05-09 | Idrætsparken, Copenhagen (H) | Sweden | 2-2 | F | Benny Nielsen, Søren Lerby |
| 415 | 1979-06-06 | Idrætsparken, Copenhagen (H) | Northern Ireland | 4-0 | ECQ | Preben Elkjær (3), Allan Simonsen |
| 416 | 1979-06-27 | Idrætsparken, Copenhagen (H) | USSR | 1-2 | F | Torsten Andersen |
| 417 | 1979-08-29 | Urheilupuisto, Mikkeli (A) | Finland | 0-0 | NC | |
| 418 | 1979-09-12 | Wembley Stadium, London (A) | England | 0-1 | ECQ | |
| 419 | 1979-09-26 | Idrætsparken, Copenhagen (H) | Finland | 1-0 | NC | Preben Elkjær |
| 420 | 1979-10-31 | Vasil Levski National Stadium, Sofia (A) | Bulgaria | 0-3 | ECQ | |
| 421 | 1979-11-14 | Estadio Ramón de Carranza, Cádiz (A) | Spain | 3-1 | F | Preben Elkjær (2), Jens Jørn Bertelsen |

== See also ==
- List of Denmark national football team results
- Denmark national football team statistics

== Sources ==
- Landsholdsdatabasen at Danish Football Association
- A-LANDSKAMPE - 1970 - 1979 at Haslund.info
