= Swimming at the 1972 Summer Olympics – Men's 100 metre backstroke =

Men's 100 metre backstroke at the Games of the XX Olympiad
- Venue: Olympia Schwimmhalle
- Dates: 28 August 1972 (heats & semifinals); 29 August 1972 (final)
- Competitors: 28 from 29 nations
- Winning time: 56:58 OR

Medalists
1st place, gold medalist(s)		Roland Matthes	East Germany
2nd place, silver medalist(s)		Mike Stamm	United States
3rd place, bronze medalist(s)		John Murphy	United States

The men's 100 metre backstroke event at the 1972 Olympic Games took place between August 28 and 29. This swimming event used backstroke. Because an Olympic-size swimming pool is 50 metres long, this race consisted of two lengths of the pool.

== Results ==
=== Heats ===
Heat 1

Rank	Athlete	Country	Time	Notes
1	Igor Grivennikov	Soviet Union	1:00.05	
2	Zoltán Verrasztó	Hungary	1:01.13	
3	Clay Evans	Canada	1:01.69	
4	Rômulo Arantes Filho	Brazil	1:03.18	
5	Hsu Tung-hsiung	Chinese Taipei	1:03.31	
6	Sergio Hasbún	El Salvador	1:06.53	
7	Sarun Van	Khmer Republic	1:07.26	

Heat 2

Rank	Athlete	Country	Time	Notes
1	Bob Schoutsen	Netherlands	1:00.76	
2	Lars Børgesen	Denmark	1:01.23	
3	László Cseh Sr.	Hungary	1:01.63	
4	José Joaquín Santibáñez	Mexico	1:02.46	
5	Predrag Miloš	Yugoslavia	1:03.02	
6	Gustavo González	Argentina	1:04.16	
7	Gerardo Rosario	Philippines	1:06.85	

Heat 3

Rank	Athlete	Country	Time	Notes
1	John Murphy	United States	59.93	
2	Ejvind Pedersen	Denmark	1:00.83	
3	Tadashi Honda	Japan	1:00.89	
4	Ian MacKenzie	Canada	1:01.11	
5	Helmut Podolan	Austria	1:01.49	
6	Piotr Dłucik	Poland	1:01.94	
7	Andreas Weber	West Germany	1:02.49	

Heat 4

Rank	Athlete	Country	Time	Notes
1	Mike Stamm	United States	58.63	
2	Lutz Wanja	East Germany	1:00.62	
3	Pierre Baehr	France	1:01.13	
4	Colin Cunningham	Great Britain	1:01.28	
5	Anders Sandberg	Sweden	1:01.41	
6	Neil Martin	Australia	1:05.13	

Heat 5

Rank	Athlete	Country	Time	Notes
1	Mitch Ivey	United States	58.15	
2	Erik Fish	Canada	1:00.81	
3	Nenad Miloš	Yugoslavia	1:00.94	
4	Clive Rushton	Great Britain	1:01.07	
5	Mark Crocker	Hong Kong	1:11.20	

Heat 6

Rank	Athlete	Country	Time	Notes
1	Roland Matthes	East Germany	1:00.01	
2	Jürgen Krüger	East Germany	1:00.65	
3	Jean-Paul Berjeau	France	1:00.83	
4	Mike Richards	Great Britain	1:01.03	
5	Róbert Rudolf	Hungary	1:02.34	
6	Amin Ahmed Adel Youssef	Egypt	1:04.40	
7	Chiang Jin Choon	Malaysia	1:07.65	

=== Semifinals ===
Semifinal 1

Rank	Athlete	Country	Time	Notes
1	Roland Matthes	East Germany	58.74	
2	Michael Stamm	United States	58.74	
3	Lutz Wanja	East Germany	59.83	
4	Tadashi Honda	Japan	1:00.43	
5	Bob Schoutsen	Netherlands	1:00.48	
6	Jean-Paul Berjeau	France	1:00.59	
7	Ian MacKenzie	Canada	1:00.92	
8	Michael Richards	Great Britain	1:01.27	

Semifinal 2

Rank	Athlete	Country	Time	Notes
1	Mitch Ivey	United States	57.99	
2	John Murphy	United States	58.64	
3	Igor Grivennikov	Soviet Union	59.15	
4	Jürgen Krüger	East Germany	1:00.06	
5	Ejvind Pedersen	Denmark	1:00.53	
6	Eric Fish	Canada	1:00.73	
7	Clive Rushton	Great Britain	1:01.25	
8	Nenad Milos	Yugoslavia	1:01.29	

=== Final ===
Rank	Athlete	Country	Time	Notes
1	Roland Matthes	East Germany	56.58	OR
2	Mike Stamm	United States	57.70	
3	John Murphy	United States	58.35	
4	Mitch Ivey	United States	58.48	
5	Igor Grivennikov	Soviet Union	59.50	
6	Lutz Wanja	East Germany	59.80	
7	Jürgen Krüger	East Germany	59.80	
8	Tadashi Honda	Japan	1:00.41	

Key: OR = Olympic record
