= Swimming at the 1972 Summer Olympics – Men's 200 metre backstroke =

Men's 200 metre backstroke at the Games of the XX Olympiad
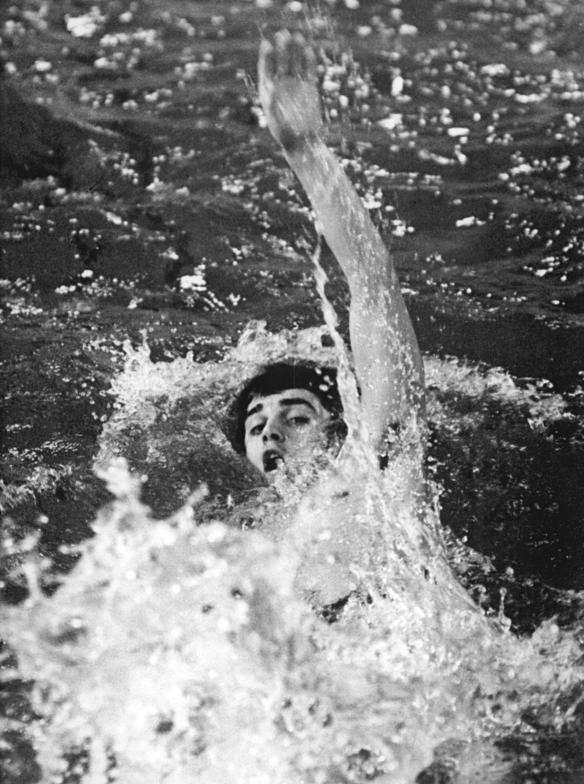
- Gold medalist Roland Matthes (1970)
- Venue: Olympia Schwimmhalle
- Date: 2 September 1972 (heats & final)
- Competitors: 36 from 23 nations
- Winning time: 2:02.82 WR

Medalists
1st place, gold medalist(s)		Roland Matthes	East Germany
2nd place, silver medalist(s)		Mike Stamm	United States
3rd place, bronze medalist(s)		Mitch Ivey	United States

The men's 200 metre backstroke event at the 1972 Summer Olympics took place on September 2 at the Olympia Schwimmhalle. There were 36 competitors from 23 nations, with each nation having up to 3 swimmers. The podium was very similar to the previous Games in 1968, with Roland Matthes of East Germany winning gold and the United States taking the other two medals, including one going to Mitch Ivey. Matthes and Ivey were the first two men to earn multiple medals in the event, with Matthes the first to win back-to-back championships and Ivey adding his 1972 bronze to his 1968 silver. Mike Stamm was the silver medalist in Munich. Matthes also defended his 1968 100 metre backstroke title, giving him the backstroke double a second time.

== Background ==
This was the fourth appearance of the 200 metre backstroke event. It was first held in 1900. The event did not return until 1964; since then, it has been on the programme at every Summer Games. From 1904 to 1960, a men's 100 metre backstroke was held instead. In 1964, only the 200 metres was held. Beginning in 1968 and ever since, both the 100 and 200 metre versions have been held.

Two of the 8 finalists from the 1968 Games returned: gold medalist Roland Matthes of East Germany and silver medalist Mitch Ivey of the United States. The American team also included Mike Stamm, who had briefly held the world record in the event in 1970 before Matthes broke it in 1970 (and then bettered his own record in 1971 and at the East German Olympic trials in 1972).

Brazil, Cambodia (then Khmer Republic), El Salvador, and Yugoslavia each made their debut in the event. Italy and the Netherlands each made their fourth appearance, the only two nations to have competed at each appearance of the event to that point.

== Competition format ==
The competition used a two-round (heats and final) format. The advancement rule followed the format introduced in 1952. A swimmer's place in the heat was not used to determine advancement; instead, the fastest times from across all heats in a round were used. There were 5 heats of up to 8 swimmers each. The top 8 swimmers advanced to the final. Swim-offs were used as necessary to break ties.

This swimming event used backstroke. Because an Olympic-size swimming pool is 50 metres long, this race consisted of four lengths of the pool.

== Records ==
These were the standing world and Olympic records (in seconds) prior to the 1964 Summer Olympics.

World record	Roland Matthes (GDR)	2:02.8	Leipzig, East Germany	10 July 1972
Olympic record	Roland Matthes (GDR)	2:09.6	Mexico City, Mexico	25 October 1968

Mike Stamm broke the Olympic record with a time of 2:07.51 in the second heat. Roland Matthes broke that record with 2:06.62 in the fifth heat. Matthes's final time of 2:02.82 is considered equal to his prior world record of 2:02.8. In all, six of the finalists beat the old Olympic record set in 1968; four were better than the record set in the heats.

== Schedule ==
All times are Central European Time (UTC+1)

Date	Time	Round
Saturday, 2 September 1972	10:35; 18:10	Heats; Final

== Results ==
=== Heats ===
Rank	Heat	Swimmer	Nation	Time	Notes
1	5	Roland Matthes	East Germany	2:06.62	Q, OR
2	2	Mike Stamm	United States	2:07.51	Q, OR
3	3	Brad Cooper	Australia	2:07.90	Q
4	3	Tim McKee	United States	2:08.19	Q
5	5	Lothar Noack	East Germany	2:08.80	Q
6	4	Mitch Ivey	United States	2:09.32	Q
7	1	Zoltán Verrasztó	Hungary	2:09.89	Q
8	4	Jean-Paul Berjeau	France	2:09.93	Q
9	4	Bob Schoutsen	Netherlands	2:10.56	
10	1	Colin Cunningham	Great Britain	2:11.06	
11	4	Tadashi Honda	Japan	2:11.11	
12	5	Anders Sandberg	Sweden	2:11.36	
13	2	Neil Martin	Australia	2:12.09	
14	5	Ejvind Pedersen	Denmark	2:12.30	
15	1	Bill Kennedy	Canada	2:12.55	
16	3	Massimo Nistri	Italy	2:12.85	
17	2	Nenad Miloš	Yugoslavia	2:12.99	
18	2	Lutz Wanja	East Germany	2:13.46	
19	5	Helmut Podolan	Austria	2:13.63	
20	4	Róbert Rudolf	Hungary	2:13.64	
21	3	José Urueta	Mexico	2:13.85	
22	3	Lars Børgesen	Denmark	2:14.50	
23	5	Pierre Baehr	France	2:14.65	
24	4	John Hawes	Canada	2:15.34	
25	1	Rafael Rocha	Mexico	2:15.81	
26	4	Norbert Verweyen	West Germany	2:15.94	
27	1	Ian MacKenzie	Canada	2:16.36	
28	3	Rômulo Arantes Filho	Brazil	2:18.15	
29	4	Predrag Miloš	Yugoslavia	2:18.43	
30	5	Bruce Featherston	Australia	2:18.63	
31	5	Gustavo González	Argentina	2:19.74	
32	3	Gerardo Rosario	Philippines	2:23.53	
33	2	Sarun Van	Khmer Republic	2:24.42	
34	2	Chiang Jin Choon	Malaysia	2:26.51	
35	1	Sergio Hasbún	El Salvador	2:27.93	
36	1	Mark Crocker	Hong Kong	2:33.64	

=== Final ===
Rank	Swimmer	Nation	Time	Notes
1st place, gold medalist(s)	Roland Matthes	East Germany	2:02.82	=WR
2nd place, silver medalist(s)	Mike Stamm	United States	2:04.09	
3rd place, bronze medalist(s)	Mitch Ivey	United States	2:04.33	
4	Brad Cooper	Australia	2:06.59	
5	Tim McKee	United States	2:07.29	
6	Lothar Noack	East Germany	2:08.67	
7	Zoltán Verrasztó	Hungary	2:10.09	
8	Jean-Paul Berjeau	France	2:11.77	
