= UEFA Euro 1976 qualifying Group 4 =

Football tournament qualification stage

Group 4 of the UEFA Euro 1976 qualifying tournament was one of the eight groups to decide which teams would qualify for the UEFA Euro 1976 finals tournament. Group 4 consisted of four teams: Spain, Romania, Scotland, and Denmark, where they played against each other home-and-away in a round-robin format. The group winners were Spain, who finished two points above Romania and Scotland.

== Final table ==
| Pos | Team | Pld | W | D | L | GF | GA | GD | Pts | Qualification | (Spain) | (Romania) | (Scotland) | (Denmark) |
|---|---|---|---|---|---|---|---|---|---|---|---|---|---|---|
| 1 | Spain | 6 | 3 | 3 | 0 | 10 | 6 | +4 | 9 | Advance to quarter-finals | — | 1–1 | 1–1 | 2–0 |
| 2 | Romania | 6 | 1 | 5 | 0 | 11 | 6 | +5 | 7 | | 2–2 | — | 1–1 | 6–1 |
| 3 | Scotland | 6 | 2 | 3 | 1 | 8 | 6 | +2 | 7 | | 1–2 | 1–1 | — | 3–1 |
| 4 | Denmark | 6 | 0 | 1 | 5 | 3 | 14 | −11 | 1 | | 1–2 | 0–0 | 0–1 | — |

Source: UEFA
Rules for classification: Qualification tiebreakers

== Matches ==
25 September 1974
19:00

| Denmark | 1–2 | Spain |
|---|---|---|
| Nygaard 48' (pen.) | | Claramunt 28' (pen.); Roberto Martínez 41' |

Idrætsparken, Copenhagen
Attendance: 27,300
Referee: John Carpenter (Rep. of Ireland)

13 October 1974
13:30

| Denmark | 0–0 | Romania |

Idrætsparken, Copenhagen
Attendance: 15,700
Referee: Ferdinand Biwersi (West Germany)

20 November 1974
20:00

| Scotland | 1–2 | Spain |
|---|---|---|
| Bremner 11' | | Quini 36', 61' |

Hampden Park, Glasgow
Attendance: 94,331
Referee: Erich Linemayr (Austria)

5 February 1975
20:30

| Spain | 1–1 | Scotland |
|---|---|---|
| Megido 67' | | Jordan 1' |

Estadio Luis Casanova, Valencia
Attendance: 40,952
Referee: Alfred Delcourt (Belgium)

17 April 1975
20:30

| Spain | 1–1 | Romania |
|---|---|---|
| Velázquez 6' | | Crişan 70' |

Santiago Bernabéu, Madrid
Attendance: 54,660 *
Referee: Charles Corver (Netherlands)

(*)NOTE: Attendance also reported as 100,000

11 May 1975
17:00

| Romania | 6–1 | Denmark |
|---|---|---|
| Georgescu 28', 76'; Crişan 40', 59'; Lucescu 83'; Dinu 85' | | Dahl 86' |

Stadionul 23. August, Bucharest
Attendance: 37,773
Referee: Nikolaos Zlatanos (Greece)

1 June 1975
17:30

| Romania | 1–1 | Scotland |
|---|---|---|
| Georgescu 21' | | McQueen 89' |

Stadionul 23. August, Bucharest
Attendance: 52,203 *
Referee: Ertuğrul Dilek (Turkey)

(*)NOTE: Attendance also reported as 80,000

3 September 1975
19:00

| Denmark | 0–1 | Scotland |
|---|---|---|
| | | Harper 51' |

Idrætsparken, Copenhagen
Attendance: 40,300
Referee: Robert Schaut (Belgium)

12 October 1975
20:30

| Spain | 2–0 | Denmark |
|---|---|---|
| Pirri 40'; Capón 85' |

Estadio Sarriá, Barcelona
Attendance: 6,869 *
Referee: Paul Bonett (Malta)

(*)NOTE: Attendance also reported as 20,000

29 October 1975
20:00

| Scotland | 3–1 | Denmark |
|---|---|---|
| Dalglish 48'; Rioch 54'; MacDougall 61' | | Bastrup 20' |

Hampden Park, Glasgow
Attendance: 48,021
Referee: Rolf Nyhus (Norway)

16 November 1975
14:00

| Romania | 2–2 | Spain |
|---|---|---|
| Georgescu 72' (pen.); Iordănescu 80' | | Villar 29'; Santillana 57' |

Stadionul 23. August, Bucharest
Attendance: 45,381
Referee: Hans-Joachim Weyland (West Germany)

17 December 1975
20:00

| Scotland | 1–1 | Romania |
|---|---|---|
| Rioch 39' | | Crişan 74' |

Hampden Park, Glasgow
Attendance: 11,375
Referee: Adolf Prokop
(East Germany)

== Goalscorers ==
There were 32 goals scored in 12 matches, for an average of 2.67 goals per match.

4 goals

- (Romania) Zoltan Crișan
- (Romania) Dudu Georgescu

2 goals

- (Scotland) Bruce Rioch
- (Spain) Quini

1 goal

- (Denmark) Lars Bastrup
- (Denmark) Peter Dahl
- (Denmark) Kristen Nygaard
- (Romania) Cornel Dinu
- (Romania) Anghel Iordănescu
- (Romania) Mircea Lucescu
- (Scotland) Billy Bremner
- (Scotland) Kenny Dalglish
- (Scotland) Joe Harper
- (Scotland) Joe Jordan
- (Scotland) Ted MacDougall
- (Scotland) Gordon McQueen
- (Spain) José Luis Capón
- (Spain) José Claramunt
- (Spain) Roberto Juan Martínez
- (Spain) Alfredo Megido
- (Spain) Pirri
- (Spain) Santillana
- (Spain) Manuel Velázquez
- (Spain) Ángel María Villar
