= Mike Stamm =

American swimmer (1952–2026)

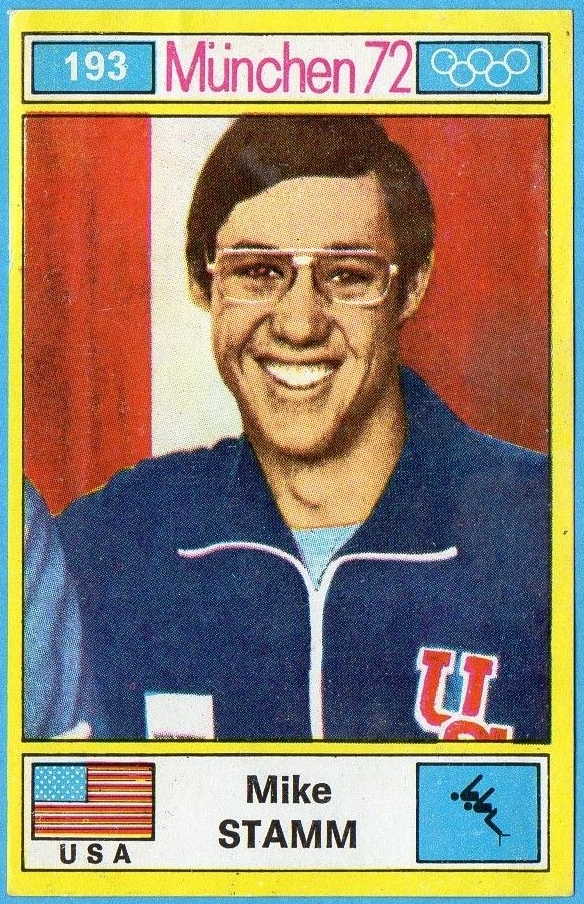

Personal information
- Full name: Michael Eugene Stamm
- Nickname: "Mike"
- National team: United States
- Born: August 6, 1952 San Pedro, California, U.S.
- Died: June 24, 2026 (aged 73) Costa Rica
- Height: 6 ft 3 in (1.91 m)
- Weight: 179 lb (81 kg)

Sport
- Sport: Swimming
- Strokes: Backstroke
- Club: Coronado Navy Swimming Association
- College team: Indiana University
- Coach: Mike Troy (Coronado); James Counsilman (IU)
Medal record
Representing the United States
Olympic Games
Gold medal – first place	1972 Munich	4×100 m medley
Silver medal – second place	1972 Munich	100 m backstroke
Silver medal – second place	1972 Munich	200 m backstroke
World Championships (LC)
Gold medal – first place	1973 Belgrade	4×100 m medley
Silver medal – second place	1973 Belgrade	100 m backstroke

Michael Eugene Stamm (August 6, 1952 – June 24, 2026) was an American backstroke swimmer and world record holder who competed for Indiana University and represented the U.S. at the 1972 Munich Olympics where he won a gold and two silver medals.

== Early life ==
Born August 6, 1952, in San Pedro, California, with the original last name of Kostich, he was raised primarily by his grandparents and his mother, who worked long hours as a secretary to support him. He began swimming at five, trained at his grandparents backyard pool, and soon joined a local AAU Club where he practiced and competed. Unlike many youngsters, Stamm enjoyed the discipline and routine of his daily two hour workouts. When he turned nine, his mother married Roland Stamm, who adopted him when he was fifteen. After a move to greater San Diego in 1963, he graduated from San Diego's Crawford High School. Swimming for Crawford High's dominant swim team, he was an All American, and set every standing school swimming record.

== Coronado Swim Association ==
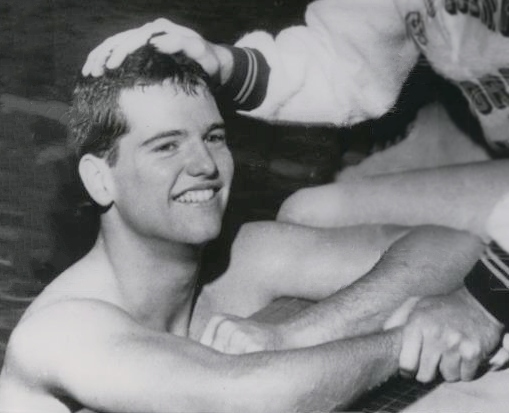
Coach Mike Troy in 1960

Once in greater San Diego, Stamm trained with the strong program at the Coronado Navy Swim team under demanding coach and former 1960 two-time Olympic champion Mike Troy. Looking back, Stamm marveled at the intensity of the training at Coronado, where he averaged 14,000 meters or around eight miles a day. The Coronado team was founded in 1963 as the Coronado Navy Swim Association, based in Coronado, California and associated with San Diego's nearby Coronado amphibious naval base. In June 1970, as a High School age record holder, he represented the Coronado Club at the Junior Olympics which hosted 100 of the leading area swimming competitors at Rancho Bernardo.

== Indiana University ==
Stamm was coached by James Counsilman at Indiana University, where he was awarded four varsity letters in swimming from 1971-1974. He swam for three NCAA championship teams and four Big 10 Conference Championship teams. A high achiever in national and regional meets, in 1973 he captured NCAA championships in the 100 and 200 meter backstroke events. He was notably a 200 meter backstroke world record holder.

== 1972 Munich Olympics ==
Seven members of Stamm's Indiana Swim team qualified for the Munich Olympics, and they trained at Westpoint Academy in preparation.

As a college Sophomore at Indiana, he earned a gold medal as a member of the winning U.S. team in the finals of the men's 4×100-meter medley relay at the 1972 Summer Olympics in Munich, Germany. Stamm led the team off with the opening backstroke leg of the medley and stayed close to the stiff backstroke competitor Roland Matthes of the German team who held the lead and swam his leg in a world record time of 56.30. American breaststroker Tom Bruce closed the small gap with the German team, giving Mark Spitz a chance to take the lead in his butterfly leg, and freestyle anchor Jerry Heidenreich to earn a comfortable lead. The American team was jubilant, winning the event with a combined time of 3:48.16, with the German team second, and the Canadian team third.

The 20-year-old Stamm also won individual silver medals in the 100-meter backstroke in a world record time of 57.70, though gold medalist Roland Matthes, who finished ahead by 1.12 seconds had also set a world record of 56.58. He won a second silver medal in the 200-meter backstroke.

=== Records ===
At that time, Stamm was the second-best backstroker in the world, behind East German Roland Matthes. Stamm briefly broke Matthes' world record in the 200-meter backstroke in 1970, but Matthes reclaimed it just three weeks later. Taking National American Athletic Union titles in 1970, Stamm set a world record of 2:06.33 in the 200 meter backstroke and 58.53 in the 100 meter backstroke.

Stamm took a break from elite swimming to return to college and complete his degree. He was not selected for the finals at the 1976 Olympic team trials in Los Angeles, finishing tenth in the 100-yard backstroke, as he had provided himself too little time for a comeback after returning to swimming in 1975. He subsequently ended his swimming career abruptly without any chance to profit from commercial endorsements despite world records and close to 18 years of intensive training.

After graduating Indiana, he worked at a Hilton Head, South Carolina swim club as a director. He later settled in his hometown of San Diego in 1974 and worked a variety of jobs. In 1978, he set up the Mike Stamm Art Gallery in La Jolla's Village Hotel where he served as salesman, buyer, guide, and accountant.

== Death ==
Stamm died in Costa Rica on June 24, 2026, at the age of 73.

== Honors ==
Stamm was inducted into the Indiana University Athletic Hall of fame in 1993 and the San Diego Hall of Champions in 1978.

== See also ==
- List of Indiana University (Bloomington) people
- List of Olympic medalists in swimming (men)
- List of World Aquatics Championships medalists in swimming (men)
- World record progression 200 metres backstroke
- World record progression 4 × 100 metres medley relay
