= 1978 FIFA World Cup qualification – UEFA Group 1 =

Football tournament qualification stage

Group 1 consisted of four of the 32 teams entered into the European zone: Cyprus, Denmark, Poland, and Portugal. These four teams competed on a home-and-away basis for one of the 8.5 spots in the final tournament allocated to the European zone. The spot would be assigned to the group's winner.

== Standings ==
Pos	Team	Pld	W	D	L	GF	GA	GD	Pts
1	Poland	6	5	1	0	17	4	+13	11
2	Portugal	6	4	1	1	12	6	+6	9
3	Denmark	6	2	0	4	14	12	+2	4
4	Cyprus	6	0	0	6	3	24	−21	0

== Matches ==
23 May 1976

Cyprus	1 – 5	Denmark
Michael 10'	Report	Simonsen 14'; Tune-Hansen 19'; Rasmussen 21'; Bastrup 51', 76'

Limassol, Cyprus
Referee: Dudin (Bulgaria)

16 October 1976

Portugal	0 – 2	Poland
	Report	Lato 49', 77'

Porto, Portugal
Referee: Kitabdjian (France)

27 October 1976

Denmark	5 – 0	Cyprus
B. Nielsen 54'; H.M. Jensen 60' (pen.), 64'; Røntved 68' (pen.); Kristensen 75'	Report

Copenhagen, Denmark
Referee: Coiling (Luxembourg)

31 October 1976

Poland	5 – 0	Cyprus
Deyna 24' (pen.), 40'; Szarmach 25'; Boniek 58'; Terlecki 76'	Report

Warsaw, Poland
Referee: Müncs (Hungary)

17 November 1976

Portugal	1 – 0	Denmark
Manuel Fernandes 69'	Report

Lisbon, Portugal
Referee: Aoussi (Algeria)

5 December 1976

Cyprus	1 – 2	Portugal
Stylianou 74' (pen.)	Report	Chalana 36'; Nené 76'

Limassol, Cyprus
Referee: Ghita (Romania)

1 May 1977

Denmark	1 – 2	Poland
Simonsen 50'	Report	Lubański 7', 55'

Copenhagen, Denmark
Referee: Mattsson (Finland)

15 May 1977

Cyprus	1 – 3	Poland
Antoniou 13'	Report	Lato 26'; Terlecki 40'; Mazur 82'

Limassol, Cyprus
Referee: Ashkenazi (Israel)

21 September 1977

Poland	4 – 1	Denmark
Masztaler 27'; Lato 38'; Deyna 62'; Szarmach 81'	Report	Nygaard 66' (pen.)

Chorzów, Poland
Referee: Rainea (Romania)

9 October 1977

Denmark	2 – 4	Portugal
Røntved 45' (pen.); A. Hansen 88'	Report	Jordão 15'; Nené 35'; Manuel Fernandes 61'; Machado 79'

Copenhagen, Denmark
Referee: Azim Zade (Soviet Union)

29 October 1977

Poland	1 – 1	Portugal
Deyna 36'	Report	Manuel Fernandes 61'

Chorzów, Poland
Referee: Eschweiler (West Germany)

16 November 1977

Portugal	4 – 0	Cyprus
Seninho 11'; Chalana 35'; Vital 58'; Manuel Fernandes 71'	Report

Faro, Portugal
Referee: Jursa (Czechoslovakia)

== Notes ==
The Goals given to Henning Munk Jensen in the 5–0 defeat of Cyprus were in fact scored my Henning Jensen a different player.
