= Peter Dahl =

Peter Dahl may refer to:

- Peter Dahl (artist) (1934–2019)
- Peter Dahl (footballer) (born 1948)
- Peter Dahl (rugby union) (born 1984)
