= Jürgen Krüger =

German swimmer

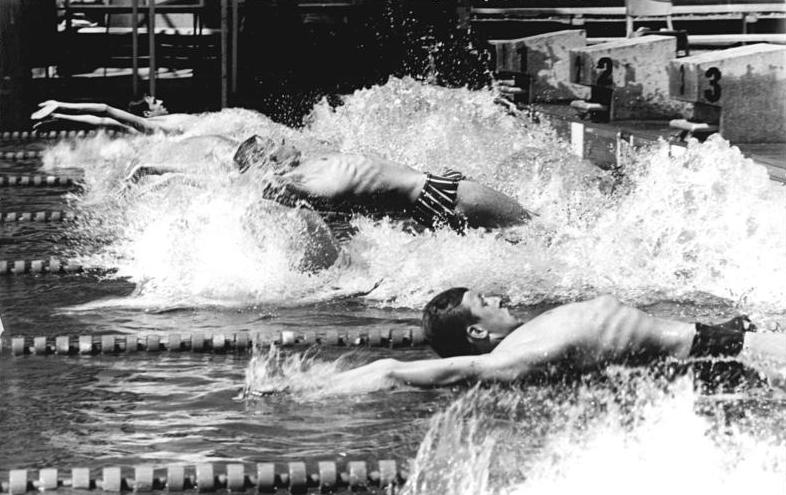
- Jürgen Krüger (front) competing against Roland Matthes (middle) in the 1971 East German men's swimming Championship

Personal information
- Born: 23 November 1954 (age 71) Ebersbach, East Germany

Sport
- Sport: Swimming

Jürgen Krüger (born 23 November 1954) is a German former swimmer. He competed in the men's 100 metre backstroke at the 1972 Summer Olympics.
