= Ulf Nilsson =

Ulf Nilsson may refer to:

- Ulf Nilsson (author) (born 1948), Swedish writer
- Ulf Nilsson (ice hockey) (born 1950), Swedish ice hockey player
- Ulf Nilsson (politician) (born 1945), Swedish politician and Member of Parliament
- Ulf Nilsson (sailor) (born 1948), Swedish Olympic sailor
