= Argand =

Argand may refer to:

- Aimé Argand (1755 – 1803), Swiss physicist and chemist and inventor of the argand lamp
- Émile Argand (1879 – 1940), Swiss geologist
- Jean-Robert Argand (1768 – 1822), French amateur mathematician
  - Argand diagram
  - Argand plane
- Luc Argand (1948 - ), Swiss lawyer.
