= Andreas Weber =

Andreas Weber may refer to:

- Andreas Weber (swimmer) (born 1953), German swimmer
- Andreas Weber (writer) (born 1967), German biologist and philosopher
