= Sailing at the 1972 Summer Olympics – Flying Dutchman =

Flying Dutchman at the Games of the XX Olympiad
- Olympics 1972 Configuration
- Venue: Kiel-Schilksee (Olympiazentrum)
- Dates: First race: 29 August 1972; Last race: 8 September 1972
- Competitors: 60 from 29 nations
- Teams: 29

Medalists
| 1st place, gold medalist(s) | | Rodney Pattisson; Christopher Davies | Great Britain |
| 2nd place, silver medalist(s) | | Yves Pajot; Marc Pajot | France |
| 3rd place, bronze medalist(s) | | Ullrich Libor; Peter Naumann | West Germany |

The Flying Dutchman was a sailing event on the Sailing at the 1972 Summer Olympics program in Kiel-Schilksee. Seven races were scheduled and completed. 60 sailors, on 29 boats, from 29 nation competed.

== Race schedule ==
Due to the interruption of the Games on 6 September 1972, the race was postponed till 7 September. Then the race conditions were unsuitable. Heavy fog and poor wind conditions made it not possible to race until 8 September. Also the medal ceremony was also postponed until 8 September.

| ● | Event competitions | ● | Event finals |

| Date | August | | | | | | September | | | | | | | | | | |
| Date | 26th Sat | 27th Sun | 28th Mon | 29th Tue | 30th Wed | 31st Thu | 1st Fri | 2nd Sat | 3rd Sun | 4th Mon | 5th Tue | 6th Wed | 7th Thu | 8th Fri | 9th Sat | 10th Sun | 11th Mon |
|---|---|---|---|---|---|---|---|---|---|---|---|---|---|---|---|---|---|
| Flying Dutchman (planning) | | | | ● | ● | ● | ● | Spare day | Spare day | ● | ● | ● | Spare day | Spare day | | | |
| Flying Dutchman (actual) | | | | ● | ● | ● | ● | Spare day | Spare day | ● | ● | | Fog | ● | | | |

== Course area and course configuration ==
For the Flying Dutchman course area B(ravo) was used. The location (54°30'30'’N, 10°13'00'’E) points to the center of the 2 nm radius circle. The distance between mark 1 and 3 was about 2nm.

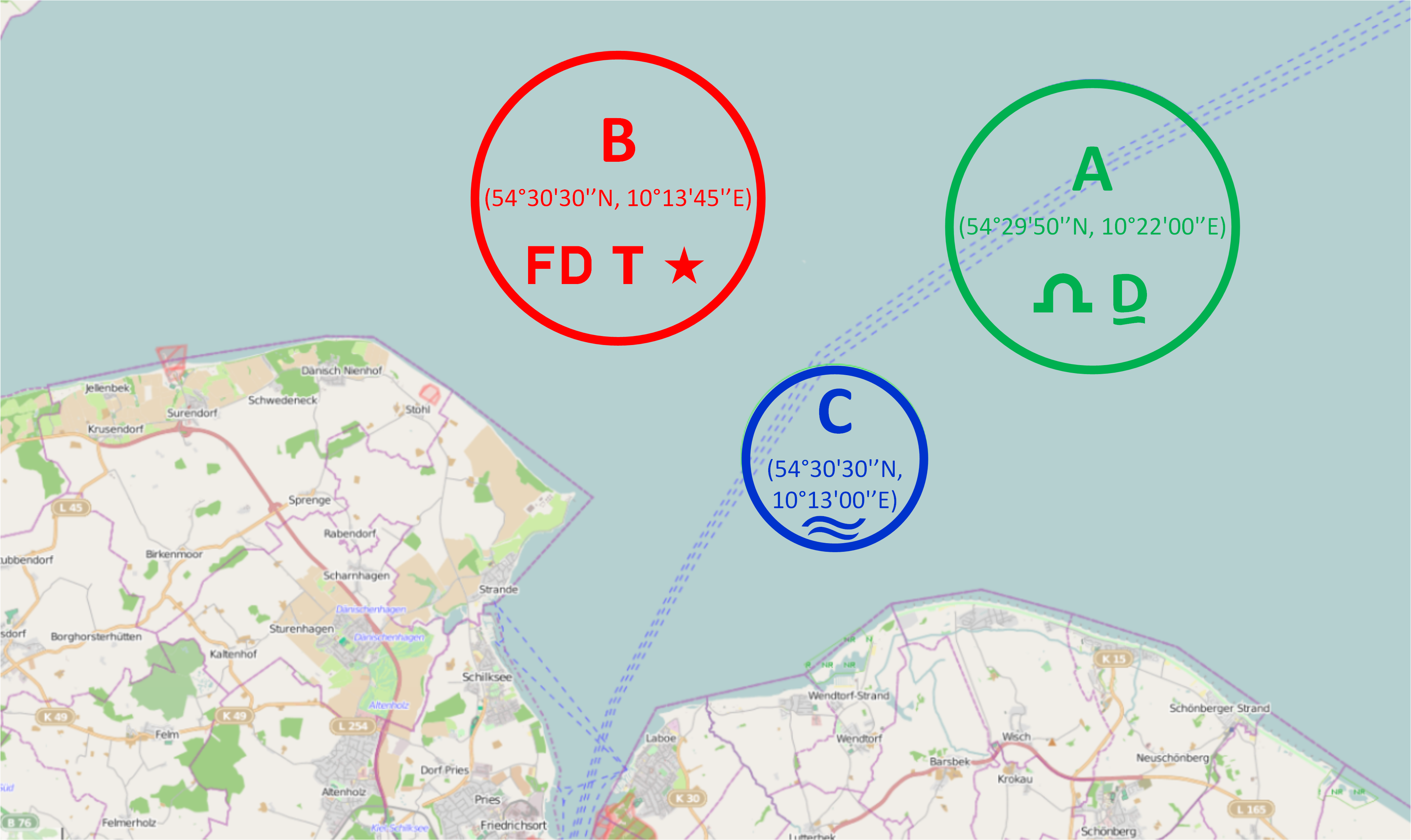

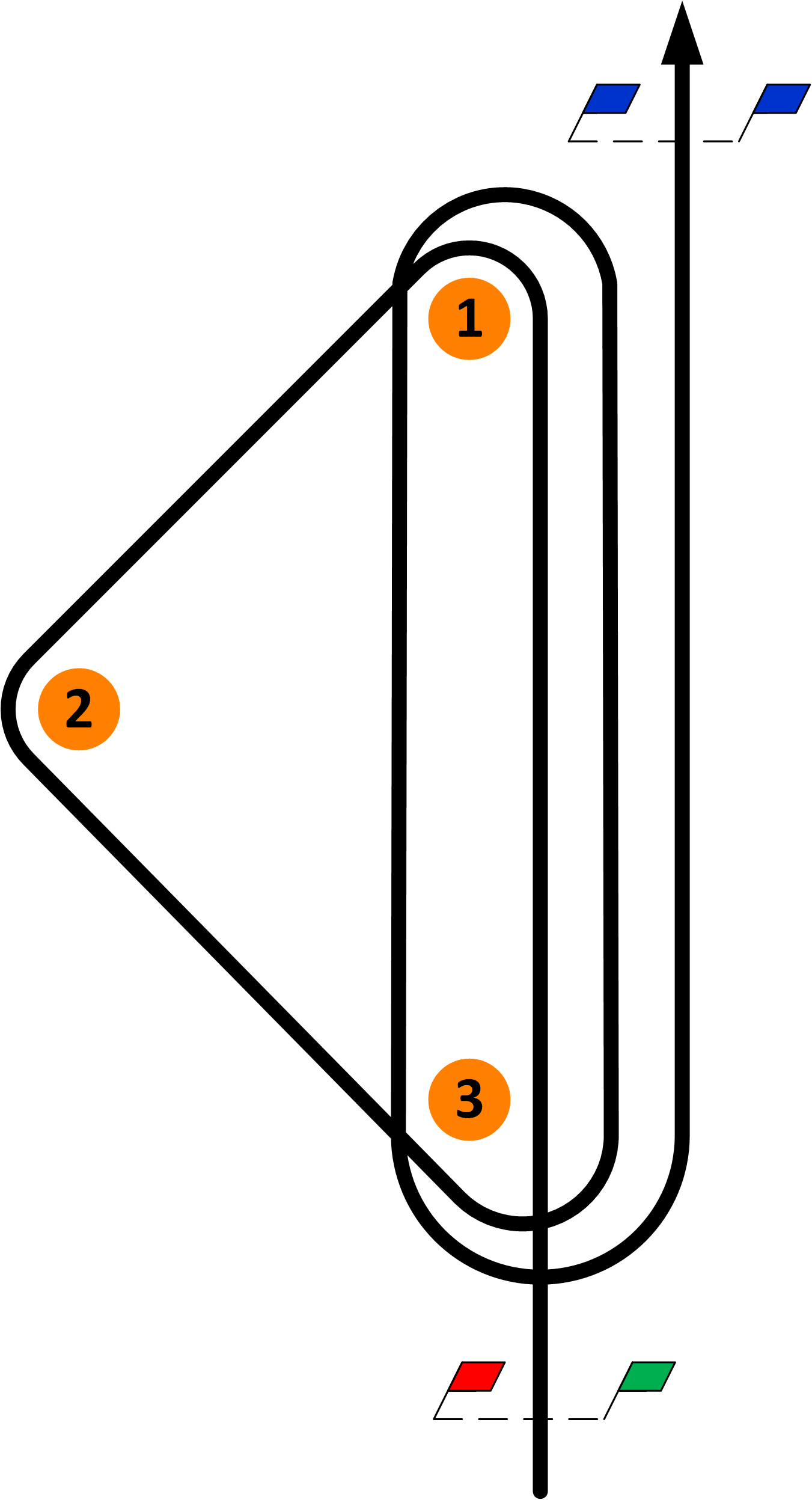

== Final results ==
These are the results of the Flying Dutchman event.

| Rank | Country | Helmsman | Crew | Race 1 | | Race 2 | | Race 3 | | Race 4 | | Race 5 | | Race 6 | | Race 7 | | Total | Total – discard |
| Rank | Country | Helmsman | Crew | Pos. | Pts. | Pos. | Pts. | Pos. | Pts. | Pos. | Pts. | Pos. | Pts. | Pos. | Pts. | Pos. | Pts. | Total | Total – discard |
| 1st place, gold medalist(s) | Great Britain | Rodney Pattisson | Christopher Davies | 1 | 0.0 | 11 | 17.0 | 1 | 0.0 | 3 | 5.7 | 1 | 0.0 | 1 | 0.0 | ~~DNS~~ | ~~35.0~~ | 57.7 | 22.7 |
| 2nd place, silver medalist(s) | France | Yves Pajot | Marc Pajot | 3 | 3.0 | 9 | 15.0 | 8 | 14.0 | 1 | 0.0 | 2 | 3.0 | ~~12~~ | ~~18.0~~ | 2 | 3.0 | 56.0 | 38.0 |
| 3rd place, bronze medalist(s) | West Germany | Ulli Libor | Peter Naumann | 5 | 10.0 | ~~14~~ | ~~20.0~~ | 3 | 5.7 | 12 | 18.0 | 3 | 5.7 | 6 | 11.7 | 1 | 0.0 | 71.1 | 51.1 |
| 4 | Brazil | Reinaldo Conrad | Burkhard Cordes | 12 | 18.0 | 3 | 5.7 | ~~19~~ | ~~25.0~~ | 9 | 15.0 | 9 | 15.0 | 2 | 3.0 | 3 | 5.7 | 87.4 | 62.4 |
| 5 | Yugoslavia | Antun Grego | Simo Nikolić | 2 | 3.0 | 7 | 13.0 | 6 | 11.7 | 5 | 10.0 | ~~16~~ | ~~22.0~~ | 7 | 13.0 | 7 | 13.0 | 85.7 | 63.7 |
| 6 | Soviet Union | Vladimir Leontiev | Valery Zubanov | 9 | 15.0 | 1 | 0.0 | 5 | 10.0 | ~~11~~ | ~~17.0~~ | 11 | 17.0 | 8 | 14.0 | 6 | 11.7 | 84.7 | 67.7 |
| 7 | Denmark | Hans Fogh | Ulrik Brock | 4 | 8.0 | 12 | 18.0 | 9 | 15.0 | 6 | 11.7 | 6 | 11.7 | 5 | 10.0 | ~~16~~ | ~~22.0~~ | 96.4 | 74.4 |
| 8 | Australia | Mark Bethwaite | Timothy Alexander | 14 | 20.0 | 6 | 11.7 | 4 | 8.0 | 4 | 8.0 | 4 | 8.0 | 14 | 20.0 | ~~22~~ | ~~28.0~~ | 103.7 | 75.7 |
| 9 | New Zealand | Jock Bilger | Murray Ross | 16 | 20.0 | ~~21~~ | ~~27.0~~ | 2 | 3.0 | 2 | 3.0 | 5 | 10.0 | 11 | 17.0 | 18 | 24.0 | 106.0 | 79.0 |
| 10 | Netherlands | Fred Imhoff | Simon Korver | 13 | 19.0 | 2 | 3.0 | 23 | 29.0 | 7 | 13.0 | 10 | 16.0 | 10 | 16.0 | ~~DNF~~ | ~~33.0~~ | 129.0 | 96.0 |
| 11 | Italy | Carlo Croce | Luciano Zinali | 8 | 14.0 | 16 | 22.0 | 18 | 24.0 | 15 | 21.0 | ~~19~~ | ~~25.0~~ | 4 | 8.0 | 8 | 14.0 | 128.0 | 103.0 |
| 12 | Sweden | Peter Kolni | Ulf Nilsson | 21 | 27.0 | 8 | 14.0 | 14 | 20.0 | 8 | 14.0 | 13 | 19.0 | ~~DSQ~~ | ~~38.0~~ | 5 | 10.0 | 142.0 | 104.0 |
| 13 | East Germany | Herbert Hüttner | Dietmar Gedde | 6 | 11.7 | 10 | 16.0 | 12 | 18.0 | ~~DNF~~ | ~~34.0~~ | 8 | 14.0 | 18 | 24.0 | 15 | 21.0 | 138.7 | 104.7 |
| 14 | Norway | Ragnar Fjoran | Christian Bendixen | 23 | 29.0 | 15 | 21.0 | 15 | 21.0 | 14 | 20.0 | 7 | 13.0 | 3 | 5.7 | ~~24~~ | ~~30.0~~ | 139.7 | 109.7 |
| 15 | Canada | Peter Byrne | Don Andrews, Evert Bastet | 18 | 24.0 | 13 | 19.0 | 7 | 13.0 | 10 | 16.0 | 12 | 18.0 | ~~21~~ | ~~27.0~~ | 21 | 27.0 | 144.0 | 117.0 |
| 16 | Hungary | Benedek Litkey | Szabolcs Izsák | 10 | 16.0 | 4 | 8.0 | 21 | 27.0 | 23 | 29.0 | 15 | 21.0 | ~~26~~ | ~~32.0~~ | 13 | 19.0 | 152.0 | 120.0 |
| 17 | Ireland | Harold Cudmore | Richard O'Shea | ~~26~~ | ~~32.0~~ | 24 | 30.0 | 16 | 22.0 | 16 | 22.0 | 17 | 23.0 | 16 | 22.0 | 4 | 8.0 | 159.0 | 127.0 |
| 18 | Austria | Kurt Seidl | Ernst Seidl | 15 | 21.0 | 5 | 30.0 | 26 | 32.0 | ~~DNS~~ | ~~35.0~~ | 18 | 24.0 | 9 | 15.0 | 19 | 25.0 | 162.0 | 127.0 |
| 19 | Japan | Akira Yamamura | Takashi Yamamura | 11 | 17.0 | 17 | 23.0 | 20 | 26.0 | 17 | 23.0 | ~~21~~ | ~~27.0~~ | 15 | 21.0 | 12 | 18.0 | 155.0 | 128.0 |
| 20 | Switzerland | Jean Degaudenzi | Luc Argand | ~~25~~ | ~~31.0~~ | 25 | 31.0 | 17 | 23.0 | 13 | 19.0 | 14 | 20.0 | 13 | 19.0 | 11 | 17.0 | 160.0 | 129.0 |
| 21 | Poland | Zbigniew Kania | Krzysztof Szymczak | 7 | 13.0 | 18 | 24.0 | 13 | 19.0 | 18 | 24.0 | 22 | 28.0 | 23 | 29.0 | ~~DSQ~~ | ~~36.0~~ | 173.0 | 137.0 |
| 22 | Greece | Anastasios Vatistas | Antonios Bonas, Khristos Bonas | 17 | 23.0 | 20 | 26.0 | 10 | 16.0 | DNF | 35.0 | ~~DNF~~ | ~~35.0~~ | 17 | 23.0 | 9 | 15.0 | 172.0 | 137.0 |
| 23 | United States | Scott Allan | Tim Stearn | 19 | 25.0 | 19 | 25.0 | 11 | 17.0 | 21 | 27.0 | 20 | 26.0 | ~~DSQ~~ | ~~38.0~~ | 14 | 20.0 | 178.0 | 140.0 |
| 24 | Hong Kong | Colin Smith | Bill Steele | 22 | 27.0 | ~~DNF~~ | ~~35.0~~ | 24 | 30.0 | 20 | 26.0 | 24 | 30.0 | 20 | 26.0 | 10 | 16.0 | 191.0 | 156.0 |
| 25 | Mexico | Lorenzo Villaseñor | Miguel Rábago | 20 | 26.0 | 23 | 29.0 | 25 | 31.0 | ~~DNF~~ | ~~34.0~~ | 23 | 29.0 | 25 | 31.0 | 17 | 23.0 | 203.0 | 169.0 |
| 26 | Israel | Yair Michaeli | Izchak Nir | 28 | 34.0 | 22 | 28.0 | 22 | 28.0 | 19 | 25.0 | 25 | 31.0 | 19 | 25.0 | ~~DNS~~ | ~~35.0~~ | 206.0 | 171.0 |
| 27 | Puerto Rico | Juan R. Torruella | José Rodríguez | 27 | 33.0 | 26 | 32.0 | ~~28~~ | ~~34.0~~ | 22 | 28.0 | 26 | 32.0 | 22 | 28.0 | 20 | 26.0 | 213.0 | 179.0 |
| 28 | Trinidad and Tobago | Richard John Bennett | David Farfan | 24 | 30.0 | ~~27~~ | ~~33.0~~ | 27 | 33.0 | 24 | 30.0 | DNF | 35.0 | 24 | 30.0 | 23 | 29.0 | 220.0 | 185.0 |
| 29 | India | Sohrab Janshed Contractor | Ahmed Abdul Basith | 29 | 35.0 | 28 | 34.0 | ~~29~~ | ~~35.0~~ | 25 | 31.0 | DNF | 35.0 | 27 | 33.0 | DNF | 33.0 | 236.0 | 201.0 |

Legend: DNF – Did not finish; DNS – Did not start; DSQ – Disqualified;
Discard is crossed out and does not count for the overall result.
Gender: – male; – female;

== Daily standings ==
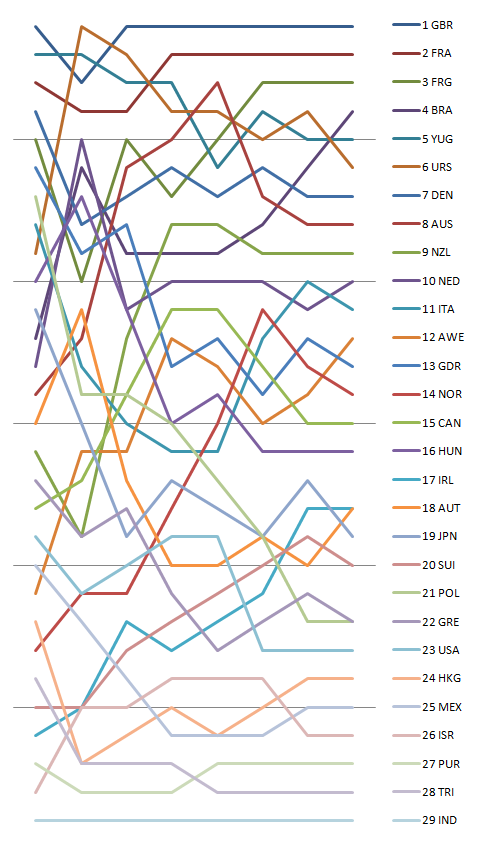
Graph showing the daily standings in the Flying Dutchman during the 1972 Summer Olympics
