= Michaeli =

Michaeli is a surname. Notable people with the surname include:

== People ==
- Anastasia Michaeli (born 1975), Israeli politician
- Avraham Michaeli (born 1957), Israeli politician
- Dani Michaeli (born 1969), American television writer, notably for SpongeBob SquarePants, and producer
- Elisheva Michaeli (1928–2009), Israeli actress
- Louise Michaëli (1830–75), Swedish opera singer
- Merav Michaeli (born 1966), Israeli politician
- Mic Michaeli (born 1962), Swedish keyboardist in rock band Europe
- Rivka Michaeli (born 1938), Israeli actress, comedian, television hostess, and entertainer
- Yair Michaeli (born 1944), Israeli Olympic competitive sailor
