= Flemming Pedersen =

Flemming Pedersen may refer to:

- Flemming Pedersen (sport shooter) (born 1958), Danish-Norwegian competitive shooter
- Flemming Pedersen (football manager) (born 1963), Danish football
- Flemming Pedersen (footballer) (born 1947), Danish footballer
