= Khristos Bonas =

Greek sailor (born 1941)

Personal information
- Nationality: Greek
- Born: 13 November 1941 (age 83)

Sport
- Sport: Sailing

Khristos Bonas (born 13 November 1941) is a Greek sailor. He competed in the Flying Dutchman event at the 1972 Summer Olympics.
