= Don Andrews (sailor) =

Canadian sailor

Don Andrew
Personal information
- Full name: Donald Andrew
- Born: 26 April 1947 Edmonton, Alberta, Canada
- Died: 10 March 1993 (aged 45) Melbourne, Australia

Sport
- Sport: Sailing

Donald Andrew (26 April 1947 – 10 March 1993) was a Canadian sailor. He competed in the Flying Dutchman event at the 1972 Summer Olympics.
