= Itzhak Nir =

Israeli sailor

Personal information
- Native name: יצחק ניר
- Nationality: Israel
- Born: December 18, 1940 (age 85)
- Height: 6 ft 5 in (196 cm)
- Weight: 187 lb (85 kg)

Sailing career
- Sport: Sailing
- Class: Mixed Two Person Heavyweight Dinghy

Itzhak Nir (Hebrew: יצחק ניר; born December 18, 1940) is an Israeli former Olympic competitive sailor.

== Sailing career ==
When he competed in the Olympics, he was 6 feet 5 inches (196 cm) tall and weighed 187 pounds (85 kg).

At an international competition in the Olympic-class Flying Dutchman dinghy in the Netherlands in April 1972, the Sdot Yam team of Nir and Yair Michaeli won the right to be the first Israeli sailors to participate in the Olympics.

Nir competed for Israel at the 1972 Summer Olympics off the coast of Kiel, 900 kilometers from Munich, Germany, at the age of 31, with Yair Michaeli in Sailing--Mixed Two Person Heavyweight Dinghy/Flying Dutchman. He and Michaeli did not participate in the final race of the competition, due to the Munich massacre in which Arab terrorists from the Black September group killed 11 Israeli Olympians at Fürstenfeldbruck Air Base outside of Munich. They came in 26th.

The Israeli government then decided to withdraw from the Olympic Games, and bring their remaining Olympians home. Nir, Michaeli, and Israeli racewalker Shaul Ladany wanted to stay for the closing ceremony, to show that they were not leaving "with their tails between their legs", but they followed the orders of the government.
