= Kurt Seidl =

Austrian sailor

Personal information
- Nationality: Austrian
- Born: 13 July 1947 (age 77)

Sport
- Sport: Sailing

Kurt Seidl (born 13 July 1947) is an Austrian sailor. He competed in the Flying Dutchman event at the 1972 Summer Olympics.
