= Krzysztof Szymczak =

Polish sailor

Personal information
- Nationality: Polish
- Born: 16 September 1951 (age 73); Szczecin, Poland

Sport
- Sport: Sailing

Krzysztof Szymczak (born 16 September 1951) is a Polish sailor. He competed in the Flying Dutchman event at the 1972 Summer Olympics.
