= Jean Degaudenzi =

Swiss sailor

Personal information
- Nationality: Swiss
- Born: 18 September 1944 (age 81)

Sport
- Sport: Sailing

Jean Degaudenzi (born 18 September 1944) is a Swiss sailor. He competed in the Flying Dutchman event at the 1972 Summer Olympics.
