= Zbigniew Kania =

Polish sailor

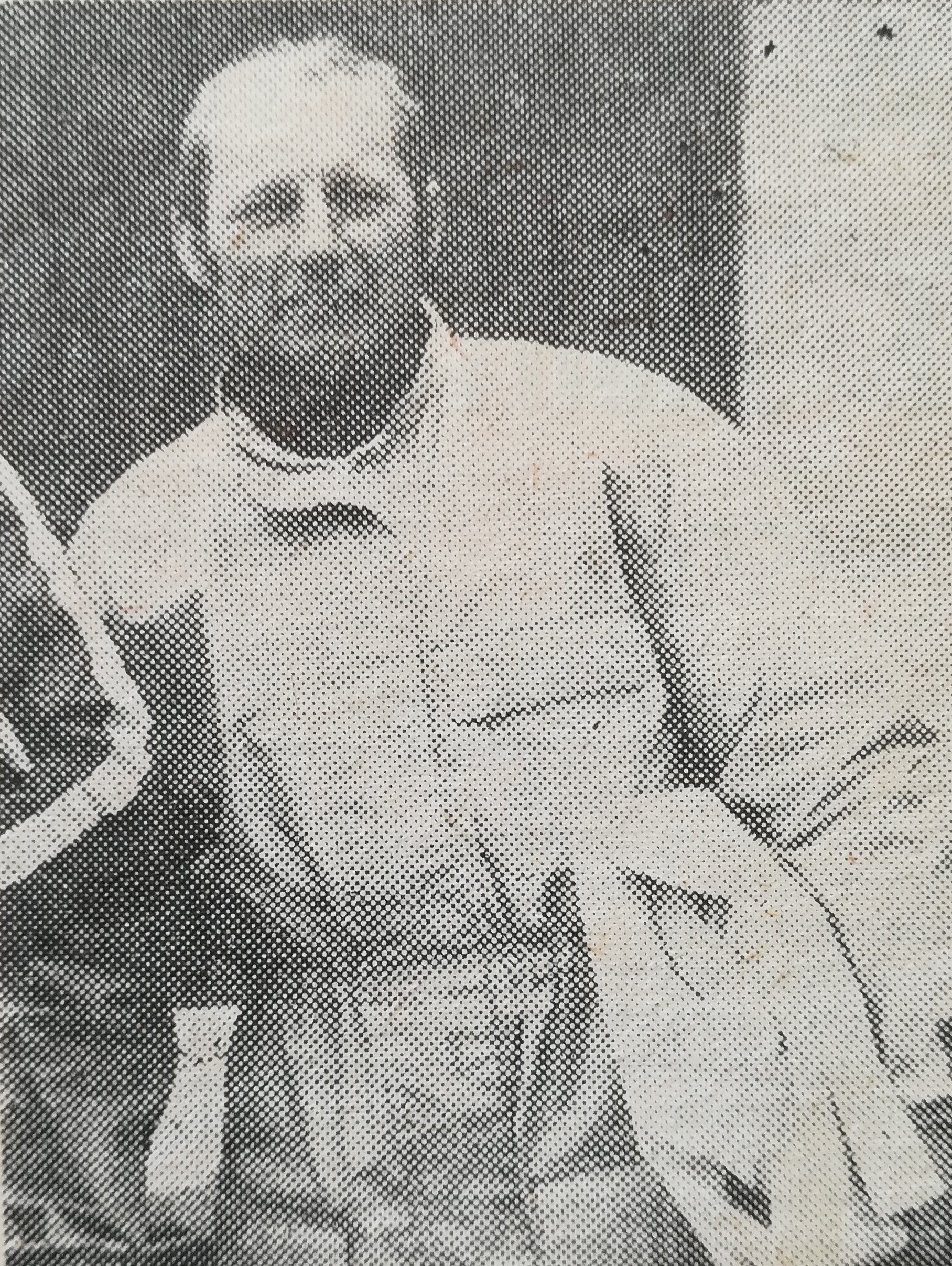
- Zbigniew Kania

Personal information
- Nationality: Polish
- Born: 17 March 1951 (age 74); Czerwińsk nad Wisłą, Poland

Sport
- Sport: Sailing

Zbigniew Kania (born 17 March 1951) is a Polish sailor. He competed in the Flying Dutchman event at the 1972 Summer Olympics.
