= José Rodríguez (sailor) =

Puerto Rican sailor

Personal information
- Full name: José A. Rodríguez Reyes
- Nationality: Puerto Rican
- Born: 16 June 1945 (age 80)
- Height: 183 cm (6 ft 0 in)

Sport
- Sport: Sailing

José A. Rodríguez Reyes (Note: In this Spanish name, the first or paternal surname is Rodríguez and the second or maternal family name is Reyes.) (born 16 June 1945) is a Puerto Rican sailor. He competed in the Flying Dutchman event at the 1972 Summer Olympics.
