= Anastasios Vatistas =

Greek sailor

Personal information
- Nationality: Greek
- Born: 26 June 1945 (age 79)

Sport
- Sport: Sailing

Anastasios Vatistas (born 26 June 1945) is a Greek sailor. He competed in the Flying Dutchman event at the 1972 Summer Olympics.
