= Miguel Rábago =

Mexican sailor (born 1941)

Personal information
- Nationality: Mexican
- Born: 19 December 1941 (age 83)

Sport
- Sport: Sailing

Miguel Rábago (born 19 December 1941) is a Mexican sailor. He competed in the Flying Dutchman event at the 1972 Summer Olympics.
