= Lothar Noack =

German swimmer

Personal information
- Born: 31 July 1942 (age 83) Dresden, East Germany

Sport
- Sport: Swimming

Lothar Noack (born 31 January 1953) is a German former swimmer. He competed in the men's 200 metre backstroke at the 1972 Summer Olympics.
