= Zoltan Crișan =

Romanian footballer

Zoltan Crișan Krizsán Zoltán
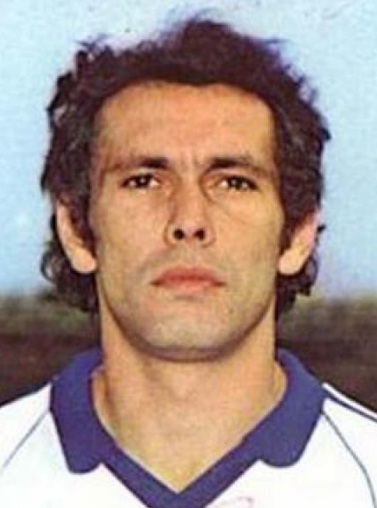

Personal information
- Full name: Zoltan Crișan
- Date of birth: 3 May 1955
- Place of birth: Oradea, Romania
- Date of death: 14 October 2003 (aged 48)
- Place of death: Craiova, Romania
- Positions: Attacking midfielder; forward

Youth career
- 1969–1973: Minerul Baia Mare

Senior career*
Years	Team	Apps	(Gls)
1973–1974	Minerul Baia Mare	32	(9)
1974–1984	Universitatea Craiova	237	(40)
1984–1985	Bihor Oradea	14	(2)
1985–1987	Olt Scornicești	45	(6)
1987	Chimia Râmnicu Vâlcea	8	(2)
Total		304	(50)

International career
1973	Romania U18	1	(1)
1973–1974	Romania U21	4	(2)
1973–1975	Romania U23	8	(1)
1975–1976	Romania Olympic	5	(0)
1977	Romania B	1	(0)
1974–1984	Romania	41	(4)

Managerial career
- Aurul Brad
- Montefano
- * Club domestic league appearances and goals

Zoltan Crișan (Hungarian: Krizsán Zoltán; 3 May 1955 – 14 October 2003) was a Romanian international footballer of Hungarian ethnicity who played for Minerul Baia Mare, Universitatea Craiova, Bihor Oradea, Olt Scornicești and Chimia Râmnicu Vâlcea. He reached the semi-finals of the 1982–83 UEFA Cup with "U" Craiova.

== Club career ==
Crișan was born on 9 December 1956 in Oradea, Romania and began playing junior-level football at Minerul Baia Mare in 1969. He started his senior career by playing for Minerul during the 1973–74 Divizia B season. Subsequently, he joined Universitatea Craiova where he made his Diviza A debut on 11 August 1974 under coach Constantin Cernăianu in a 1–1 away draw against Universitatea Cluj.

Crișan went on to play 10 seasons for "U" Craiova, being part of the "Craiova Maxima" generation that won two consecutive league titles in 1980 and 1981. At the first one he contributed with three goals scored in the 29 appearances given to him by coach Valentin Stănescu and in the second he netted a career best of 10 goals in the 29 matches that coach Ion Oblemenco used him. He also won the Cupa României four times, but played in only three finals, scoring once in the 6–0 victory over Politehnica Timișoara in the 1981 final.

Crișan played 30 games and scored five goals for "U" Craiova in European competitions. In the second round of the 1979–80 UEFA Cup, he played in one leg of the 4–0 aggregate win over Leeds United, as Universitatea became the first Romanian club that eliminated a team from England in European competitions. Afterwards, they reached the quarter-finals in the 1981–82 European Cup by eliminating Olympiacos and Kjøbenhavns Boldklub, with him scoring a goal against the latter, being eliminated with 3–1 on aggregate by Bayern Munich. He made 10 appearances in the 1982–83 UEFA Cup campaign, with Crișan scoring once against Kaiserslautern, as they reached the semi-finals where they were eliminated by Benfica on the away goal rule after 1–1 on aggregate.

In 1984, Crișan went to play for his hometown club, Bihor Oradea. However, after six months, he joined Olt Scornicești. In the middle of the 1986–87 season, he went to Chimia Râmnicu Vâlcea with whom he suffered a relegation at the end of the season, retiring afterwards. His last Divizia A appearance took place on 10 May 1987 in Chimia's 2–1 home loss to SC Bacău, totaling 304 matches with 50 goals in the competition.

== International career ==
From 1973 to 1977, Crișan was consistently featured for Romania's under-18, under-21, under-23, Olympic and B teams.

Crișan played 41 matches and scored four goals for Romania, making his debut on 4 December 1974 when coach Valentin Stănescu sent him at halftime to replace Mircea Lucescu in a 1–0 friendly victory against Israel. Subsequently, he played five matches in the Euro 1976 qualifiers and scored four goals of which one was in a 1–1 draw against Spain, two were netted in a 6–1 win over Denmark and the final one was in a 1–1 draw against Scotland. He played in all four matches during the World Cup 1978 qualifiers, helping to secure victories in the first two games against Spain and Yugoslavia, but ultimately failed to qualify for the final tournament after losing the second leg against both opponents, thus finishing second in the group behind the Spaniards. Crișan played three matches in the 1977–80 Balkan Cup, including a 4–1 victory against Yugoslavia in the final. He also played five games during the Euro 1980 qualifiers. Then he made six appearances in the 1982 World Cup qualifiers which included a 2–1 home win and a 0–0 away draw against England. His last appearance for the national team took place on 11 April 1984 in a 0–0 friendly draw against Israel.

=== International goals ===
Scores and results list Romania's goal tally first, score column indicates score after each Crișan goal.

List of international goals scored by Zoltan Crișan
#	Date	Venue	Opponent	Score	Result	Competition
1	17 April 1975	Estadio Santiago Bernabéu, Madrid, Spain	Spain	1–1	1–1	Euro 1976 qualifiers
2	11 May 1975	23 August Stadium, Bucharest, Romania	Denmark	2–0	6–1	Euro 1976 qualifiers
3	11 May 1975	23 August Stadium, Bucharest, Romania	Denmark	3–0	6–1	Euro 1976 qualifiers
4	17 December 1975	Hampden Park, Glasgow, Scotland	Scotland	1–1	1–1	Euro 1976 qualifiers

== Coaching career ==
After he ended his playing career, Crișan coached Aurul Brad in Romania and Montefano in Italy.

== Personal life and death ==
In 2003, Crișan received the Honorary Citizen of Craiova title.

Crișan died of tuberculosis on 14 October 2003 at the age of 48 in Craiova.

Ion Jianu, a Romanian journalist, wrote a book about his life titled Patimile lui Crișan (The Passions of Crișan) published in 2004. Another book about him was written by sports commentator Ilie Dobre, titled Zoltan Crișan, irezistibila extremă (Zoltan Crișan, the irresistible winger), which was also released in 2004.

== Honours ==
Universitatea Craiova

- Divizia A: 1979–80, 1980–81
- Cupa României: 1976–77, 1977–78, 1980–81, 1982–83

Romania

- Balkan Cup: 1977–80
