= Sunds =

- Town
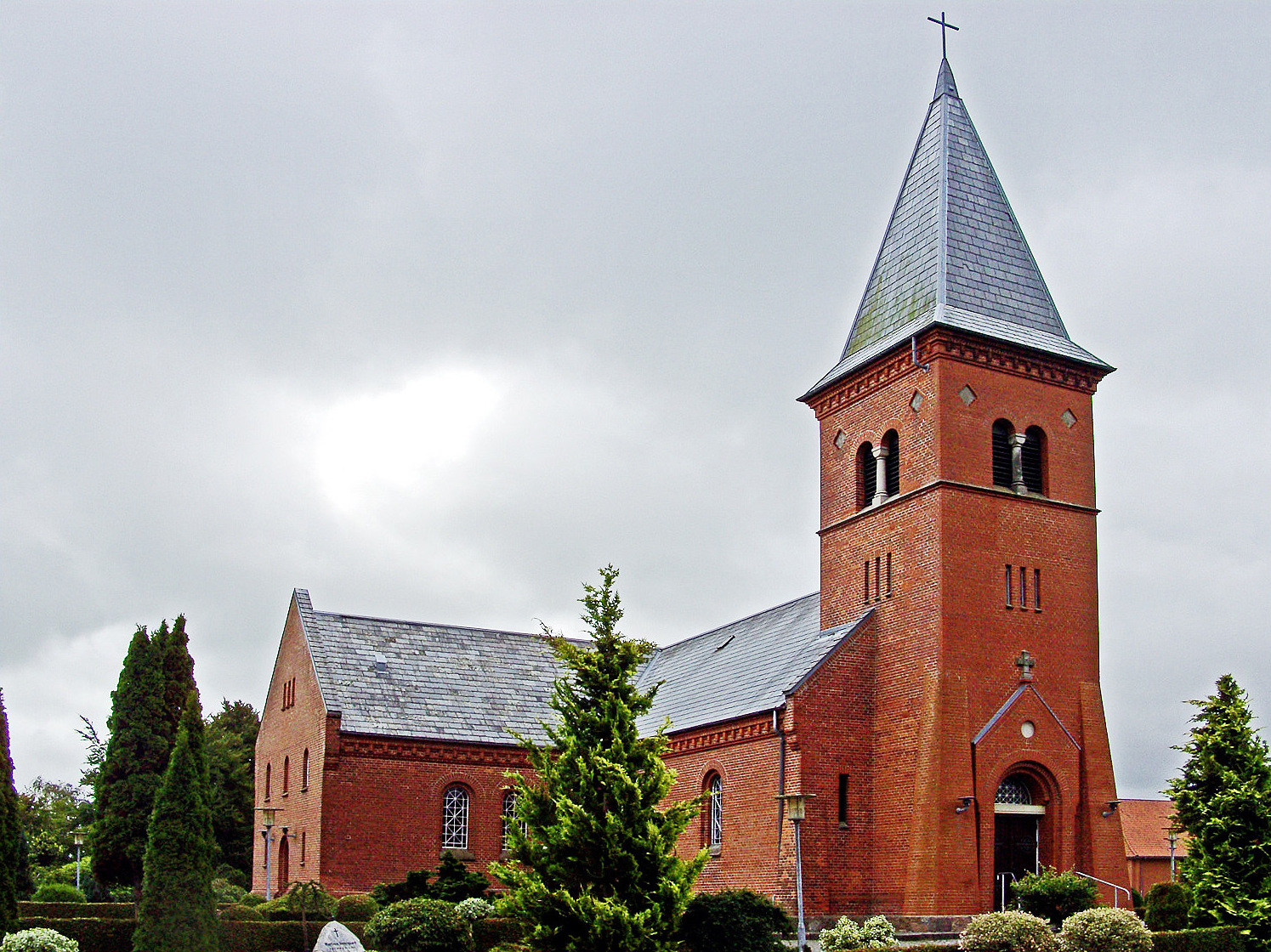
- Sunds Church

- Location in Denmark Sunds (Central Denmark Region)
- Coordinates: 56°12′30″N 9°0′43″E
- Country: Denmark
- Region: Midtjylland
- Municipality: Herning

Area
  - Total: 3.5 km^{2} (1.4 sq mi)

Population (1. January 2026)
  - Total: 4,335
  - Density: 1,200/km^{2} (3,200/sq mi)
  - Gender: 2,161 males and 2,174 females
- Time zone: UTC+1 (CET)
  - Summer (DST): UTC+2 (CEST)
- Postal code: DK-7451 Sunds

Sunds is a town, with a population of 4,335 (1. January 2026), in the municipality of Herning, Central Denmark Region in Denmark. It is located 13 km northwest of Ikast, 39 km southwest of Viborg, 44 km south of Skive and 8 km north of Herning.

== Etymology ==
The oldest known source for the name Sunds is from 1325, where the form Sunzsæ appears. Later evidence includes forms such as Swndz (1495), Gammel Sunds (1547) and Sunds (1688). The name is composed of the noun sund, probably in the original meaning of the word svømning, which means 'swimming', and the Old Danish noun sǣ, which is a side form of sø, meaning 'lake'. The name thus means 'swimming lake'.

== History ==
Even at the census of 1901, Sunds had only 65 inhabitants spread over 13 properties. When the railroad between Herning and Viborg opened in 1906, Sunds got a station, and this set in motion urban development. By 1925, Sunds had 308 inhabitants.

The population continued to rise through the 20th century; in 1960 there were 1,039 inhabitants, and in 1970 there were 2,191. The extensive textile industry in the Herning region left a strong mark on Sunds, as the city in the mid-1960s was home to 12 knitwear factories. From the middle of the 20th century, Sunds and the surrounding area were also increasingly influenced by tourism, as Sunds Sø attracted many tourists who, among other things, enjoyed opportunities for swimming and fishing.

After 1970, Sunds developed into a suburb of Herning, and in 2006 the city had 3,759 inhabitants. The railway closed to passenger traffic in 1971. Several single-family housing districts emerged, but also a number of industries within a relatively wide range of production branches. Among the most important is Kyocera Unimerco (founded 1964), which produces tools for the metal, energy and food industries as well as measurement technology, Danfoss Gemina (1987), which manufactures heat exchangers, and Joha (founded 1963), which supplies children's clothing.

== Notable people ==
- Kristen Nygaard (1949–), former international footballer who played for AZ Alkmaar and Nîmes
- René Munk Thalund (1971–), keyboard player of the band Nephew
- Ulrik Lindkvist (1981–), former footballer
