= Ahmed Abdul Basith =

Indian sailor

Personal information
- Nationality: Indian
- Born: 9 January 1942
- Died: February 2021 (aged 79)
- Height: 178 cm (5 ft 10 in)
- Weight: 75 kg (165 lb)

Sport
- Sport: Sailing

Ahmed Abdul Basith (9 January 1942 – February 2021) was an Indian sailor. He competed in the Flying Dutchman event at the 1972 Summer Olympics.
