= Benedek Litkey =

Hungarian sailor (1942–2011)

Personal information
- Nationality: Hungarian
- Born: 26 March 1942; Ócsa, Hungary
- Died: 18 June 2011 (aged 69); Alsóörs, Hungary

Sport
- Sport: Sailing

Benedek Litkey (26 March 1942 – 18 June 2011) was a Hungarian sailor. He competed in the Flying Dutchman event at the 1972 Summer Olympics.
