= Tim Stearn =

American sailor (born 1948)

Personal information
- Born: April 25, 1948 (age 78) Evanston, Illinois, United States

Sport
- Sport: Sailing

Leatham "Tim" Stearn (born April 25, 1948) is an American sailor. He competed in the Flying Dutchman event at the 1972 Summer Olympics.
