= Norbert Verweyen =

German swimmer

Personal information
- Born: 8 October 1950 (age 75) Bonn, West Germany

Sport
- Sport: Swimming

Norbert Verweyen (born 8 October 1950) is a German former swimmer. He competed in the men's 200 metre backstroke at the 1972 Summer Olympics.

As of 2009, Verweyen headed a legal estate company on the island of Ko Samui.
