= Richard O'Shea =

Irish sailor

Personal information
- Nationality: Irish
- Born: 9 March 1945 (age 80); Nairobi, Kenya

Sport
- Sport: Sailing

Richard O'Shea (born 9 March 1945) is an Irish sailor. He competed in the Flying Dutchman event at the 1972 Summer Olympics.
