= Svend Andresen =

Danish footballer (born 1950)

Personal information
- Full name: Svend Jørgen Gerner Andresen
- Date of birth: 20 May 1950 (age 76)
- Place of birth: Østerbro, Denmark
- Position: Defender

Senior career*
Years	Team	Apps	(Gls)
1967–1976	B 1903	10	(0)
1976–1978	Eintracht Trier	48	(0)
1978–1979	B 1903	?	(0)
Total		58	(0)

International career
1967	Denmark U19	1	(0)
1969–1973	Denmark U21	11	(0)
1970–1975	Denmark	29	(0)
- * Club domestic league appearances and goals

Svend Jørgen Gerner Andresen (born 20 May 1950) is a Danish former association football player, who played 29 games for the Denmark national football team from 1970 to 1975, and represented Denmark at the 1972 Summer Olympics. Born in Østerbro, Andresen played as a defender for B 1903, before he moved abroad and played 48 games for Eintracht Trier in the German 2nd Bundesliga from 1976 to 1978. He also played 11 games for the Denmark national under-21 football team.
