= Yair Michaeli =

Israeli sailor

Personal information
- Native name: יאיר מיכאלי
- Nationality: Israeli
- Born: September 13, 1944
- Died: November 2024 (aged 80)
- Height: 5 ft 7 in (170 cm)
- Weight: 150 lb (68 kg)

Sailing career
- Sport: Sailing
- Class: Mixed Two Person Heavyweight Dinghy

Yair Michaeli (Hebrew: יאיר מיכאלי; September 13, 1944 – November 2024) was an Israeli Olympic competitive sailor. During the Yom Kippur War, he served on an Israeli Navy patrol boat. He was married to Mandy Michaeli.

== Sailing career ==
When he competed in the Olympics, he was 5 feet 7 inches (170 cm) tall and weighed 150 pounds (68 kg). At an international competition in the Olympic-class Flying Dutchman dinghy in the Netherlands in April 1972, the Sdot Yam team of Michaeli and Itzhak Nir won the right to be the first Israeli sailors to participate in the Olympics.

Michaeli competed for Israel at the 1972 Summer Olympics off the coast of Kiel, 900 kilometers from Munich, Germany, at the age of 27, with Itzhak Nir in Sailing--Mixed Two Person Heavyweight Dinghy/Flying Dutchman. He and Nir did not participate in the final race of the competition, due to the Munich massacre in which Arab terrorists from the Black September group killed 11 Israeli Olympians at Fürstenfeldbruck Air Base outside of Munich. They came in 26th.

The Israeli government then decided to withdraw from the Olympic Games, and bring their remaining Olympians home. Michaeli, Nir, and Israeli racewalker Shaul Ladany wanted to stay for the closing ceremony, to show that they were not leaving "with their tails between their legs", but they followed the orders of the government.
