= Mogens Therkildsen =

Danish footballer (born 1940)

Personal information
- Full name: Mogens Benno Therkildsen
- Date of birth: 15 March 1940 (age 86)
- Place of birth: Struer, Denmark
- Height: 1.80 m (5 ft 11 in)
- Position: Goalkeeper

International career
Years	Team	Apps	(Gls)
1971–1973	Denmark		

Mogens Benno Therkildsen (born 15 March 1940) is a Danish former footballer who played as a goalkeeper. He competed in the men's tournament at the 1972 Summer Olympics.
