= Valdemar Hansen =

Danish footballer

Personal information
- Full name: Jørn Valdemar Hansen
- Date of birth: 19 May 1946 (age 80)
- Place of birth: Nysted, Denmark
- Height: 1.80 m (5 ft 11 in)
- Position: Goalkeeper

Senior career*
Years	Team	Apps	(Gls)
1965–1966	B.1901 Nykøbing		
1966–1967	Døllefjelde Musse		
1971–1973	Frem		
1973–1976	Slagelse B&I		

International career
1973	Denmark	1	(0)
- * Club domestic league appearances and goals

Jørn Valdemar Hansen (born 19 May 1946) is a Danish former footballer who played as a goalkeeper. He made one appearance for the Denmark national team in 1973 and competed in the men's tournament at the 1972 Summer Olympics.
