= Torben Bjerre-Poulsen =

Danish fencer

Personal information
- Born: 22 October 1949 (age 76) Copenhagen, Denmark

Sport
- Sport: Fencing

Torben Bjerre-Poulsen (born 22 October 1949) is a Danish fencer. He competed in the team épée event at the 1972 Summer Olympics.
