= Jørgen Thorup =

Danish fencer (born 1950)

Personal information
- Born: 7 May 1950 (age 76) Copenhagen, Denmark

Sport
- Sport: Fencing

Jørgen Thorup (born 7 May 1950) is a Danish fencer. He competed in the team épée event at the 1972 Summer Olympics.
