= Iver Schriver =

Danish footballer (born 1949)

Personal information
- Full name: Iver Kirk Schriver
- Date of birth: 4 August 1949 (age 77)
- Place of birth: Lemvig, Denmark
- Position: Forward

Senior career*
Years	Team	Apps	(Gls)
1967–1970	Herning Fremad		
1970–1972	Vejle Boldklub	96	(48)
1972–1975	Sturm Graz		
1975	Beerschot		
1975–1976	Vejle Boldklub		
1976–1977	Herning Fremad		
1977–1981	Kolding IF		

International career
1971	Denmark U21	8	
1971–1972	Denmark	5	(6)
- * Club domestic league appearances and goals

Iver Schriver (born 4 August 1949) is a Danish former footballer.

== Biography ==
Iver Schriver was born in Lemvig but moved to Aulum with his family at a young age. Already then it was obvious that Schriver was a big talent.

In 1970 Schriver made his first big move from Herning Fremad to the Danish top side Vejle Boldklub. In Vejle Schriver experienced winning the Danish championship in 1971 and The double in 1972. As a result of this Schriver was called up for the Danish national team, where he played five matches and scored six goals.

In 1972 Schriver moved abroad to play for Sturm Graz in Austria before joining Beerschot in 1975. After this Schriver went back to Vejle Boldklub. The same year the club won the Danish Cup.

== Career statistics ==
=== International ===
Appearances and goals by national team and year
National team	Year	Apps	Goals
Denmark	1971	5	6
Total		5	6

Scores and results list Denmark's goal tally first, score column indicates score after each Schriver goal.

List of international goals scored by Iver Schriver
No.	Date	Venue	Opponent	Score	Result	Competition
1	28 July 1971	Københavns Idrætspark, Copenhagen, Denmark	Japan	1–0	3–2	Friendly
2	1 August 1971	Aalborg Stadium, Aalborg, Denmark	England	1–0	3–2	Friendly
3	21 August 1971	Flensburger Stadion, Flensburg, West Germany	West Germany	1–0	3–2	Friendly
4	21 August 1971	Flensburger Stadion, Flensburg, West Germany	West Germany	1–0	3–2	Friendly
5	26 September 1971	Ullevaal Stadion, Oslo, Norway	Norway	1–0	4–1	1968–71 Nordic Football Championship
6	26 September 1971	Ullevaal Stadion, Oslo, Norway	Norway	3–0	4–1	1968–71 Nordic Football Championship
