= Ulf Nilsson (sailor) =

Swedish sailor

Personal information
- Nationality: Swedish
- Born: 28 February 1948 (age 77); Gothenburg, Sweden

Sport
- Sport: Sailing

Ulf Nilsson (born 28 February 1948) is a Swedish sailor. He competed in the Flying Dutchman event at the 1972 Summer Olympics.
