= Kirsten Strange-Campbell =

Danish swimmer

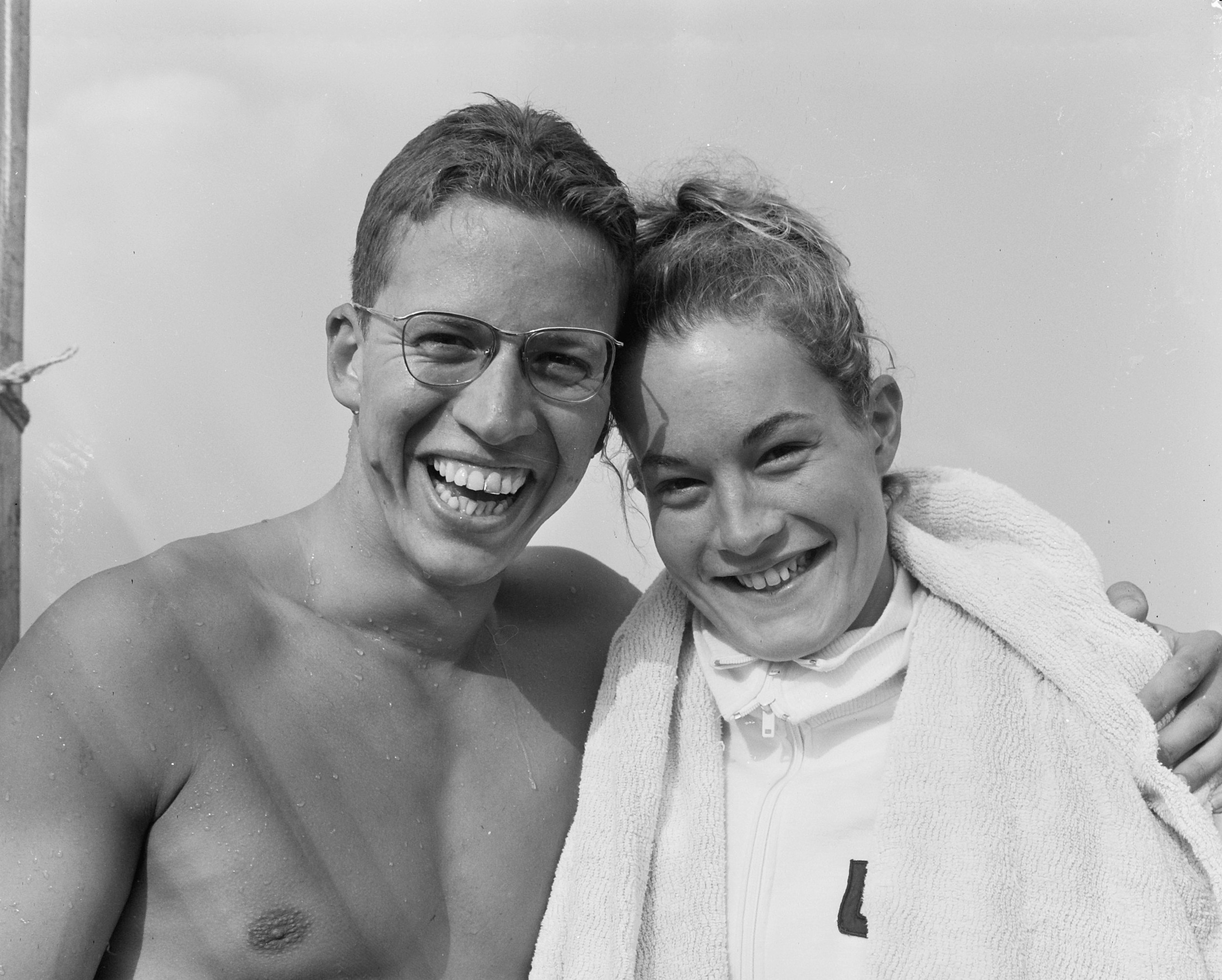
- Kirsten Strange-Campbell (right) in 1964

Personal information
- Born: 14 July 1944 (age 81) Frederiksberg, Denmark
- Height: 1.76 m (5 ft 9 in)
- Weight: 64 kg (141 lb)

Sport
- Sport: Swimming
- Club: Studenternes Svømmeklub USG, København/Randers Svømmeklub Neptun

Kirsten Strange-Campbell (born 14 July 1944) is a Danish retired swimmer. She competed at the 1964, 1968 and 1972 Summer Olympics in the 100 m and 200 m freestyle and 200 m and 400 m medley events (eight in total), but failed to reach the final in any of them.
