= Vagn Andersen =

Danish sports shooter (1937–2012)

Personal information
- Born: 9 August 1937 Frederikssund, Denmark
- Died: 6 May 2012 (aged 74)

Sport
- Sport: Sports shooting

Vagn Andersen (9 August 1937 – 6 May 2012) was a Danish sports shooter. He competed in two events at the 1972 Summer Olympics.
