= Kirsten Knudsen =

Danish swimmer

Personal information
- Born: 2 July 1953 (age 73) Copenhagen, Denmark

Sport
- Sport: Swimming

Kirsten Knudsen (born 2 July 1953) is a Danish former middle-distance freestyle swimmer. She competed in two events at the 1972 Summer Olympics.
