= Jan Sørensen =

Danish footballer (1955–2024)

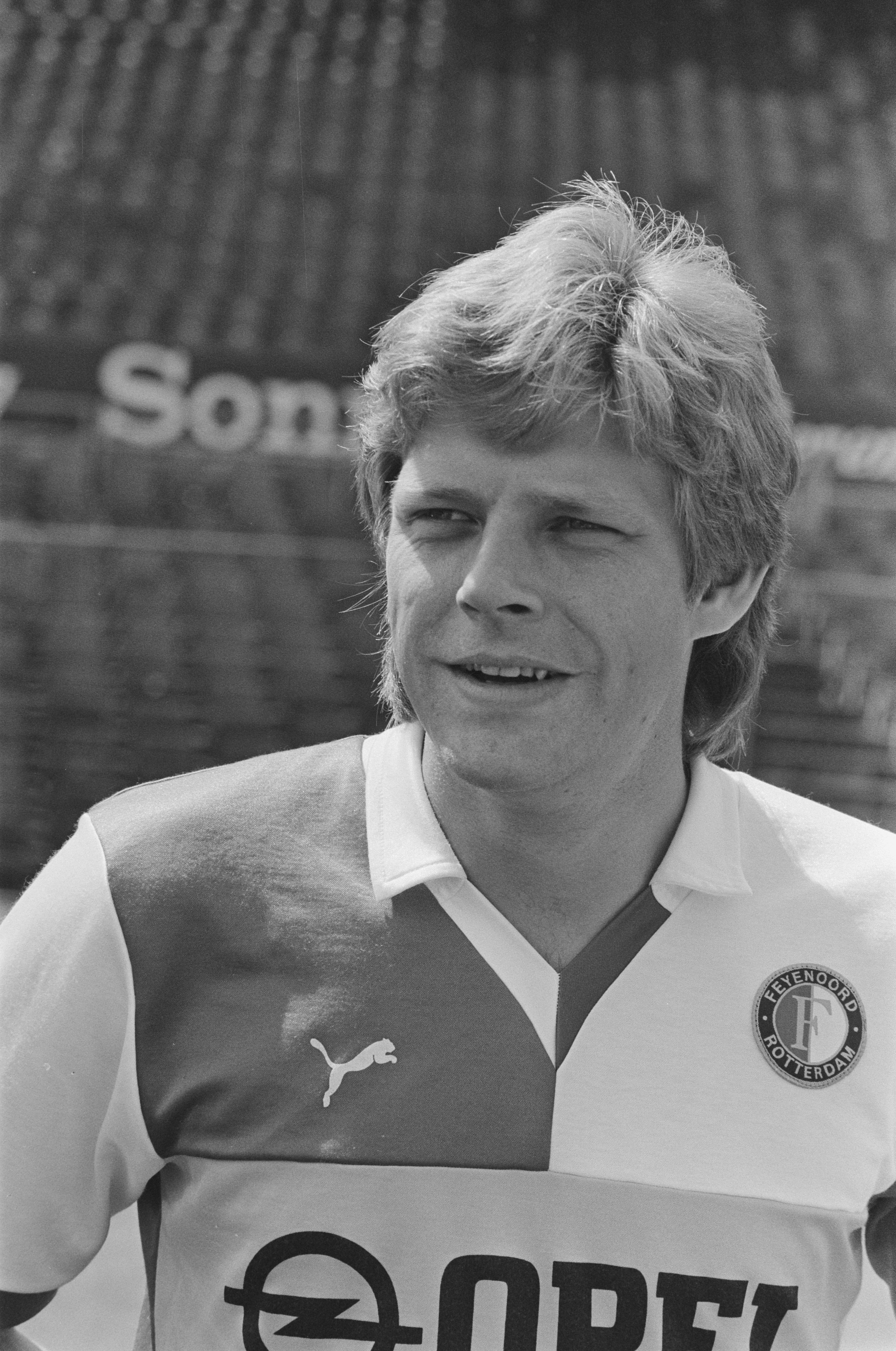
- Sørensen with Feyenoord in 1985

Personal information
- Full name: Jan Johnsen Sørensen
- Date of birth: 14 May 1955
- Place of birth: Glostrup, Denmark
- Date of death: 16 February 2024 (aged 68)
- Position: Striker

Youth career
- Glostrup

Senior career*
Years	Team	Apps	(Gls)
1976–1977	Frem	11	(6)
1977–1983	Club Brugge	156	(50)
1983–1985	Twente	73	(18)
1985–1986	Feyenoord	25	(9)
1986–1987	Excelsior	27	(7)
1987	Ajax	5	(0)
1987–1989	Portimonense	33	(5)
Total		330	(95)

International career
1977–1980	Denmark	11	(3)

Managerial career
- 1989–1990: Portimonense
- 1991–1992: Algarve United
- 1997–1998: Walsall
- 2002–2004: Hvidovre (sports director)
- * Club domestic league appearances and goals

Jan Johnsen Sørensen (14 May 1955 – 16 February 2024) was a Danish professional footballer who played as a striker. He most notably played professionally for Belgian club Club Brugge as well as Twente, Feyenoord and Ajax in the Netherlands. He played 11 matches and scored three goals for the Denmark national team from 1977 to 1980.

== Career ==
Sørensen started his career with Glostrup, before joining Frem in Denmark ahead of the 1977 season. He proceeded to move abroad to play professionally for Belgian team Club Brugge in 1977. He reached the 1978 European Cup final with Club Brugge, which they lost to English club Liverpool. He played six seasons at Club Brugge, scoring a total of 63 goals in 185 matches, and winning two Belgian Jupiler League championships. He left the club in 1983, and moved to the Netherlands to play for Twente, Feyenoord, Excelsior and Ajax. He ended his active career with Portimonense in Portugal.

Following his retirement, he was appointed manager of Walsall in June 1997. He spent eleven months at the club, leaving again in May 1998. He later became sports director of Danish club Hvidovre.

== Later life and death ==
Jan ran a pub called the Prince of Wales in the Tamworth area.

Sørensen died following a long illness on 16 February 2024, at the age of 68.

== Career statistics ==
Scores and results list Denmark's goal tally first, score column indicates score after each Sørensen goal.

List of international goals scored by Jan Sørensen
No.	Date	Venue	Opponent	Score	Result	Competition
1	30 January 1977	Box Bar Stadium, Banjul, Gambia	Gambia		4–1	Friendly
2	13 April 1977	Vasil Levski National Stadium, Sofia, Bulgaria	Bulgaria		1–3	Friendly
3	1 June 1977	Ullevaal Stadion, Oslo, Norway	Norway		2–0	Friendly

== Honours ==
=== Player ===
Club Brugge

- Belgian First Division: 1977–78, 1979–80
- Belgian Cup runner-up: 1978–79, 1982–83
- Belgian Supercup: 1980
- European Champion Clubs' Cup runner-up: 1977–78
- Jules Pappaert Cup: 1978
- Bruges Matins: 1979, 1981
- Japan Cup Kirin World Soccer: 1981
