= Peter Johansson (Danish footballer) =

Danish footballer (born 1948)

Personal information
- Date of birth: 12 August 1948 (age 78)
- Place of birth: Copenhagen, Denmark
- Position: Forward

Senior career*
| Years | Team | Apps | (Gls) |
| 1966–1972 | Slagelse B&I | | |
| 1972–1974 | KV Mechelen | | |
| 1974–1979 | Slagelse B&I | | |

International career
| 1971–1972 | Denmark U21 | 2 | (2) |
| 1972 | Denmark | 3 | (1) |
- * Club domestic league appearances and goals

Peter Johansson (born 12 August 1948) is a Danish former footballer who played as a forward for Slagelse B&I and Belgian club KV Mechelen. He made three appearances for the Denmark national team in 1972.
