= Henning Clausen =

Danish sports shooter (born 1939)

Personal information
- Born: 16 October 1939 (age 86)

Sport
- Sport: Sports shooting

Henning Clausen (born 16 October 1939) is a Danish former sport shooter who competed in the 1972 Summer Olympics, in the 1976 Summer Olympics and in the 1980 Summer Olympics.
