= Winnie Nielsen =

Danish swimmer

Personal information
- Born: 14 February 1953 (age 73) Copenhagen, Denmark

Sport
- Sport: Swimming

Winnie Nielsen (born 14 February 1953) is a Danish former breaststroke swimmer. She competed in two events at the 1972 Summer Olympics.
