= Ulrik Brock =

Danish sailor

Personal information
- Full name: Ulrik Lennart Brock
- Nationality: Danish
- Born: 16 January 1945 (age 81) Copenhagen, Denmark
- Height: 1.88 m (6.2 ft)

Sailing career
- Sport: Sailing
- Club: Hellerup Sejlklub
- Class: Flying Dutchman

Ulrik Lennart Brock (born 16 January 1945, in Copenhagen) is a sailor from Denmark. Brock represented his country at the 1972 Summer Olympics in Kiel. Brock took 7th place in the Danish Flying Dutchman with Hans Fogh as helmsman.
