= Arne Jacobsen (archer) =

Danish archer (born 1942)

Personal information
- Full name: Arne Erik Jacobsen
- Born: 12 June 1942 (age 84) Aarhus, Denmark
- Height: 178 cm (5 ft 10 in)
- Weight: 72 kg (159 lb)
Medal record
Men's archery
Representing Denmark
World Outdoor Championships
Silver medal – second place	1969 Valley Forge	Recurve team
European Outdoor Championships
Bronze medal – third place	1968 Reutte	Recurve team
Silver medal – second place	1970 Hradec Králové	Recurve individual
Silver medal – second place	1972 Walferdange	Recurve individual
Silver medal – second place	1974 Zagreb	Recurve team

Arne Erik Jacobsen (born 12 June 1942) is a Danish archer. He competed at the 1972 Summer Olympics and the 1976 Summer Olympics.
