= Heino Hansen =

Danish footballer (born 1947)

Personal information
- Full name: Arvo Heino Raudanma Hansen
- Date of birth: 24 September 1947 (age 79)
- Place of birth: Gørlev, Denmark
- Height: 1.69 m (5 ft 7 in)
- Position: Midfielder

Senior career*
Years	Team	Apps	(Gls)
1972–1974	Slagelse B&I		
1974–1976	FC St. Pauli	74	(14)
1976–1978	Preußen Münster	63	(3)
1978–1980	Slagelse B&I		
1980–1982	Næstved IF		

International career
1972–1978	Denmark	31	(5)
- * Club domestic league appearances and goals

Arvo Heino Raudanma Hansen (born 24 September 1947) is a Danish former professional footballer who played as a midfielder. He played for Danish club Slagelse B&I, as well as German clubs FC St. Pauli and SC Preußen Münster in the 2. Bundesliga. He made 31 appearances and scored five goals for the Denmark national team from 1972 to 1978, and represented Denmark at the 1972 Summer Olympics football tournament

Hansen started his career with Slagelse B&I. He debuted for the Danish national team in July 1972, scoring a goal in the 5–2 win against Iceland. He scored three goals in six games at the 1972 Olympics in Germany, and moved to play in the 2. Bundesliga after the tournament. He played 74 games and scored 14 goals for St. Pauli between 1974 and 1976, and played 63 games and scored three goals for Münster between 1976 and 1978. He moved back to Slagelse where he ended his career.
