= Benny Nielsen (footballer, born 17 March 1951) =

Danish footballer (born 1951)

- Nielsen training with RWDM in 1977

Personal information
- Full name: Jørgen Nielsen
- Date of birth: 17 March 1951 (age 75)
- Place of birth: Frederiksværk, Denmark
- Position: Forward

Team information
- Current team: Director of football - BK Avarta

Youth career
- Brederød IF

Senior career*
Years	Team	Apps	(Gls)
1970–1971	AB		
1971–1974	Cercle Brugge	79	(21)
1974–1977	RWDM		
1977–1981	Anderlecht		
1981–1982	AS Saint-Étienne		

International career
	Denmark U-19	1	(0)
	Denmark U-21	2	(0)
1970–1980	Denmark	28	(7)

Managerial career
- 2012: Greve Fodbold
- 2015–: BK Avarta (director of football)
- * Club domestic league appearances and goals

Jørgen "Benny" Nielsen (born 17 March 1951) is a Danish former football player. His position on the field was usually striker, although he also could play as midfielder. Nielsen played 28 matches for Denmark, scoring 7 goals. He made his début against Scotland in a 1–0 loss.

Nielsen started playing football with Brederød IF. He made his a-team début with AB. In 1971, he left Denmark for Belgium. His Belgian career took off immediately, with a hat trick in a cup match against SK Gullegem. One season later, fellow Dane Morten Olsen became Nielsen's teammate.

In 1974, Nielsen went to RWDM. The team became national champions that season. Just like with Cercle, Nielsen would also stay three seasons for the Brussels team RWDM, as he went to their main rivals Anderlecht. This was again quite a successful move, as Anderlecht won the UEFA Cup Winners' Cup that season. In 1981, Nielsen won the national title with Anderlecht. This was also his last season in Belgium. Nielsen ended his career with French side AS Saint-Étienne.

After retiring as a player he worked as a scout for Chelsea F.C. in Denmark. He managed Greve Fodbold from March 2012 until October 2012.

== Honours ==
=== Player ===
==== RWD Molenbeek ====
- Belgian First Division: 1974–75
- Jules Pappaert Cup: 1975
- Amsterdam Tournament: 1975

RSC Anderlecht

- Belgian First Division: 1980–81
- European Cup Winners' Cup: 1977–78 (winners)
- European Super Cup: 1978
- Tournoi de Paris: 1977
- Jules Pappaert Cup: 1977
- Belgian Sports Merit Award: 1978
