= Jack Hansen (Danish footballer) =

Danish footballer (born 1947)

Personal information
- Date of birth: 2 October 1947 (age 79)
- Place of birth: Ubberud, Denmark

International career
| Years | Team | Apps | (Gls) |
- Denmark

Jack Hansen (born 2 October 1947) is a Danish former footballer. He competed in the men's tournament at the 1972 Summer Olympics.
