= Roland Matthes =

German swimmer (1950–2019)

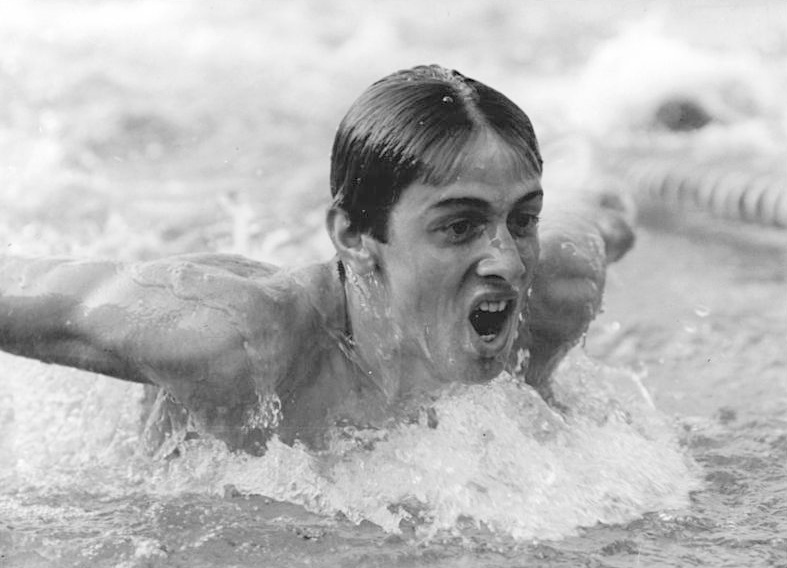
- Matthes in 1970

Personal information
- Nickname: "Rolls-Royce of Swimming"
- Nationality: East Germany
- Born: 17 November 1950 Pößneck, Thuringia, East Germany
- Died: 20 December 2019 (aged 69) Wertheim, Baden-Württemberg, Germany
- Height: 1.89 m (6 ft 2 in)
- Weight: 74 kg (163 lb)

Sport
- Sport: Swimming
- Strokes: Backstroke
- Club: Sportclub Turbine Erfurt
Medal record
Men's swimming
Representing East Germany
Olympic Games
Gold medal – first place	1968 Mexico City	100 m backstroke
Gold medal – first place	1968 Mexico City	200 m backstroke
Gold medal – first place	1972 Munich	100 m backstroke
Gold medal – first place	1972 Munich	200 m backstroke
Silver medal – second place	1968 Mexico City	4×100 m medley
Silver medal – second place	1972 Munich	4×100 m medley
Bronze medal – third place	1972 Munich	4×100 m freestyle
Bronze medal – third place	1976 Montreal	100 m backstroke
World Championships
Gold medal – first place	1973 Belgrade	100 m backstroke
Gold medal – first place	1973 Belgrade	200 m backstroke
Gold medal – first place	1975 Cali	100 m backstroke
Silver medal – second place	1973 Belgrade	4×100 m medley
Bronze medal – third place	1973 Belgrade	4×100 m freestyle
European Championships
Gold medal – first place	1970 Barcelona	100 m backstroke
Gold medal – first place	1970 Barcelona	200 m backstroke
Gold medal – first place	1970 Barcelona	4×100 m medley
Gold medal – first place	1974 Vienna	100 m backstroke
Gold medal – first place	1974 Vienna	200 m backstroke
Silver medal – second place	1970 Barcelona	100 m freestyle
Silver medal – second place	1974 Vienna	100 m butterfly
Bronze medal – third place	1970 Barcelona	4×100 m freestyle
Bronze medal – third place	1970 Barcelona	4×200 m freestyle
Bronze medal – third place	1974 Vienna	4×100 m freestyle

Roland Matthes (German pronunciation: [ˈʁoːlant ˈmatəs], audio; 17 November 1950 – 20 December 2019) was a German swimmer and the most successful backstroke swimmer of all time. Between April 1967 and August 1974 he won all backstroke competitions he entered. He won four European championships and three world championships in a row, and swam 19 world and 28 European records in various backstroke, butterfly and medley events. He was trained by Marlies Grohe.

== Swimming career ==
As an Olympian in 1968, 1972 and 1976 he won a total of eight medals (four gold, two silver and two bronze): In 1968 and 1972 he won gold in both the 100 m and 200 m backstroke, while in 1976 he was third in the 100 m backstroke. In addition to these individual events, he won the 4 × 100 m team medley silver in 1968 and 1972, and a bronze medal for the 4 × 100 m freestyle relay in 1972. At Montreal, he was the only East German male swimmer to win a medal.

In 1973 in Belgrade he became the first world champion holding the titles in both the 100 m and 200 m backstroke. Additionally he won silver in the 4 × 100 m medley and bronze in the 4 × 100 m freestyle relay. Two years later in 1975 he defended his world title in the 100 m backstroke.

At the European championships in 1970 in Barcelona and 1974 in Vienna he won all four titles for the 100 and 200 m backstroke. Additionally, in Barcelona he won the individual silver for the 100 m freestyle, gold with the 4 × 100 m medley team, and bronze with both the 4×100 and 4 × 200 m freestyle teams. In Vienna, he also won the individual silver for 100 m butterfly, and bronze with the 4 × 100 m freestyle team.

He was selected East German Sportspersonality of the Year seven times, in 1967–1971, 1973 and 1975. In 1981 he was inducted into the International Swimming Hall of Fame.

From 1970 to 1977 he studied sport sciences at DHfK in Leipzig and from 1978 to 1984 he studied medicine at the University of Jena. After graduating he worked as an orthopedic surgeon. He retired from swimming in 1976, and in May 1978 married Kornelia Ender, a fellow East German Olympic swimmer. They divorced in 1982.

The issue of doping in East Germany brought into questioning most achievements of East German athletes. However, Matthes denied any involvement in doping, claiming that his swimming club was too small to be part of the government system.

== Death ==
Matthes died on 20 December 2019 at the age of 69.

His competitor in the backstroke and five time Olympic champion John Naber said of Matthes upon his death "Roland was the greatest backstroker that ever lived. He was the first swimmer to successfully defend both Olympic backstroke titles, and he also won medals in international competition in freestyle and butterfly. Some say that only a slow reaction to the gun kept Roland from giving Mark Spitz the race of his life in the 1972 Olympic 100-meter butterfly final in Munich. Matthes was invincible on his back for a decade. His smooth strokes and powerful acceleration made every race I watched him swim become a foregone conclusion".

== See also ==
- List of members of the International Swimming Hall of Fame
- World record progression 100 metres backstroke
- World record progression 200 metres backstroke
- World record progression 4 × 100 metres medley relay

Records
Preceded by Charles Hickcox	Men's 100 metre backstroke world record holder (long course); 21 September 1967 – 18 July 1976	Succeeded by John Naber
Preceded by –	Men's 200 metre backstroke world record holder (long course); 2 September 1972 – 19 June 1976	Succeeded by John Naber
Awards
Preceded by Frank Wiegand	East German Sportsman of the Year; 1967–1971	Succeeded by Wolfgang Nordwig
Preceded by Wolfgang Nordwig	East German Sportsman of the Year; 1973	Succeeded by Hans-Georg Aschenbach
Preceded by Hans-Georg Aschenbach	East German Sportsman of the Year; 1975	Succeeded by Waldemar Cierpinski
