= Sten Ziegler =

Danish footballer

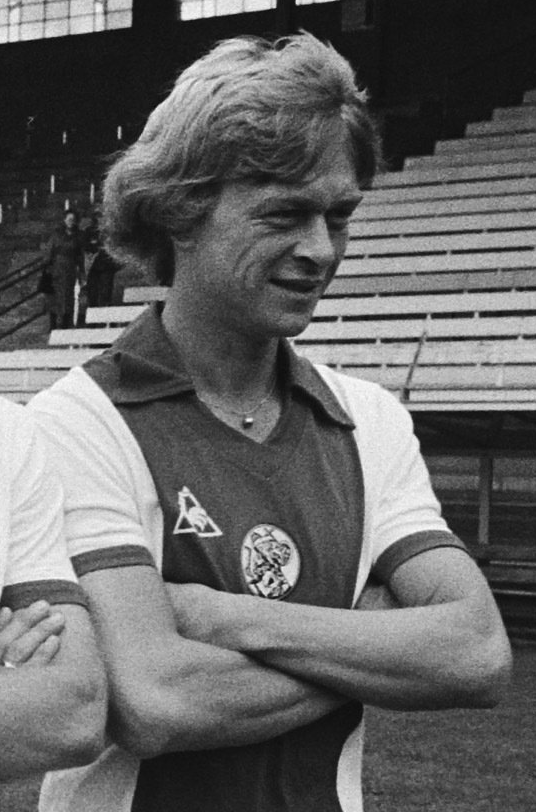

Personal information
- Full name: Sten Hugo Ziegler
- Date of birth: 30 May 1950 (age 76)
- Place of birth: Copenhagen, Denmark
- Position: Midfielder

Senior career*
Years	Team	Apps	(Gls)
1968–1974	Hvidovre IF	89	(16)
1974–1979	Roda JC	155	(6)
1979–1980	Hvidovre IF	14	(1)
1980–1981	Ajax	36	(1)
1981–1983	Hvidovre IF	36	(0)
Total		330	(24)

International career
1971–1981	Denmark	25	(1)
- * Club domestic league appearances and goals

Sten Hugo Ziegler (born 30 May 1950) is a Danish former football player who played for Hvidovre IF in Denmark and Roda JC and Ajax in the Netherlands. He played 25 games and scored one goal for the Danish national team from 1971 to 1981, and represented Denmark at the 1972 Summer Olympics football tournament.
