= Andreas Weber (swimmer) =

German swimmer

Personal information
- Nationality: German
- Born: 3 April 1953 (age 73) Darmstadt, West Germany

Sport
- Sport: Swimming

Andreas Weber (born 3 April 1953) is a German former swimmer. He competed in three events at the 1972 Summer Olympics.
