= Flemming Pedersen (footballer) =

Danish footballer (born 1947)

Personal information
- Date of birth: 2 September 1947 (age 79)
- Place of birth: Frederiksberg, Denmark
- Height: 1.74 m (5 ft 9 in)
- Position: Left-back

Senior career*
Years	Team	Apps	(Gls)
1968–1977	Kjøbenhavns Boldklub		

International career
1969–1972	Denmark U21	11	(0)
1970–1972	Denmark	7	(0)
- * Club domestic league appearances and goals

Flemming Pedersen (born 2 September 1947) is a Danish former footballer who played as a left-back. He competed with the Denmark national team in the men's tournament at the 1972 Summer Olympics.
