= Jean-Paul Berjeau =

French swimmer (born 1953)

Personal information
- Born: 21 June 1953
- Died: 21 March 2013 (aged 59)
- Height: 1.83 m (6 ft 0 in)
- Weight: 74 kg (163 lb)

Sport
- Sport: Swimming
- Club: Racing Club de France
Medal record
Representing France
European Championships
Silver medal – second place	1970 Barcelona	4×100 m medley

Jean-Paul Berjeau (21 June 1953 – 21 March 2013) was a French swimmer who won a silver medal in the 4 × 100 m medley relay at the 1970 European Aquatics Championships. He also competed in the 4 × 100 m medley relay and 100 m and 200 m backstroke at the 1972 Summer Olympics; his best achievement was eighth place in the 200 m event.
