= Luc Argand =

Swiss sailor

Personal information
- Nationality: Swiss
- Born: 7 January 1948 (age 78) Geneva, Switzerland

Sport
- Sport: Sailing

Luc Argand (born 7 January 1948) is a Swiss lawyer, was a partner at the Kellerhals Carrard law firm. Prior to that, he was a senior partner at the De Pfyffer law firm in Geneva. He is a former Chairman of the Geneva Bar Association.

Luc Argand competed in the 1972 Summer Olympics in Munich in the sailing Flying Dutchman category. He has been a judge for the Court of Arbitration for Sport since 1990, and notably presided over the trials of tennis player Richard Gasquet and cyclist Richard Virenque. He was a legal advisor to Bernie Ecclestone, and a trustee of Formula One Holdings until 2004. He was also the President of the Geneva Motor Show from 2005 until 2011.

== Money Laundering probes and Corruption ==
Luc Argand is notable for the Dassault System of money laundering and political corruption probe . This well-oiled system also went through Dassault's Geneva-based lawyer, Luc Argand. "This former president of the bar managed several foundations that held bank accounts that housed Dassault's money," explains Yann Philippin, a journalist at Mediapart and co-author of the book Dassault Système (Robert Laffont). Gérard Limat and Luc Argand are under investigation in France for "complicity in vote buying" in the case of the electoral corruption of Serge Dassault in Corbeil-Essonne, of which he was mayor from 1995 to 2009. Luc Argand is also called in as the legal advisor for Gilbert Chagoury and was under investigation for the infamous Nigerian Abacha clan money laundering and corruption scandal around Swiss Bank Rothschild. Luc Argand served on Rothschild private bank board in Geneve as administrator between 1984 and 2020. These transfers would not have been possible without the help of the Geneva lawyer Luc Argand, former President of the Bar Association, ex-president of the Motor Show, partner of the dePfyffer law firm and current president of the Commission de Surveillance des Notaires. According to the minutes of the French justice, it was Luc Argand who held the strings of the two Liechtenstein foundations that fueled this thirst for liquidity based on money laundering systems, Pegasus and Balzane.

Judged for corruption in 2026 and 2027 in a Kuwaiti siphoning case. Corruption Federal Prosecutor's Office (MPC) Federal Court (TF) Geneva Public Prosecutor's Office. Pierre Mirabaud, former head of Swiss bankers, on trial for corruption with Luc Argand former head of the Geneva's lawyers association, August 26, 2026. He admitted to the facts and repaid 42 million francs. Three prominent people from Geneva are also convicted in the same case: the former Geneva Bar president Luc Argand is among them, and the head of a fiduciary company.
