= Keld Bak =

Danish footballer (born 1944)

Personal information
- Full name: Keld Egon Bak
- Date of birth: 7 June 1944 (age 82)
- Place of birth: Næstved, Denmark
- Position: Striker

Senior career*
Years	Team	Apps	(Gls)
- Kalvehave IF
- Bårse
- Tornemark
- Næstved IF

International career
1966-1972	Denmark	14	(3)
- * Club domestic league appearances and goals

Keld Egon Bak (born 7 June 1944) is a Danish footballer. He competed in the men's tournament at the 1972 Summer Olympics.

== International career ==
Bak played a total of fourteen official international matches (three goals) for Denmark. Under national coach Poul Petersen, he made his debut on 30 November 1966 in the European Championship qualifying match against the Netherlands (2-0) in Rotterdam, just like Henning Munk Jensen (Aalborg). Bak participated with his country in the 1972 Olympic Games in West Germany, where he scored twice in the match against Morocco (3-1) in Passau.
