= Ejvind Pedersen =

Danish swimmer

Personal information
- Born: 22 March 1950 (age 76) Copenhagen, Denmark

Sport
- Sport: Swimming

Ejvind Pedersen (born 22 March 1950) is a Danish former backstroke swimmer. He competed at the 1968 Summer Olympics and the 1972 Summer Olympics.
