= Peter Dahl (footballer) =

Danish footballer (born 1948)

Personal information
- Date of birth: 14 February 1948 (age 78)
- Place of birth: Copenhagen, Denmark
- Position: Forward

Senior career*
Years	Team	Apps	(Gls)
1967–1969	Akademisk BK		
1970–1971	Hvidovre IF	23	(12)
1971–1972	Rot-Weiss Essen	28	(25)
1972–1974	Lierse S.K.	36	(15)
1973–1977	Hannover 96	81	(32)

International career
1972–1975	Denmark	7	(3)

Managerial career
- 1978–1981: BK Fremad Amager
- 1984: Akademisk BK
- * Club domestic league appearances and goals

Peter Dahl (born 14 February 1948) is a Danish former football forward who played for Akademisk Boldklub, Hvidovre IF, Rot-Weiss Essen, Lierse S.K. and Hannover 96. Dahl was head coach for BK Fremad Amager from January 1978 until August 1981.
