= Lars Børgesen =

Danish swimmer

Personal information
- Born: 6 March 1954 (age 72) Aaby, Aarhus, Denmark

Sport
- Sport: Swimming

Lars Børgesen (born 6 March 1954) is a Danish former backstroke swimmer. He competed in two events at the 1972 Summer Olympics.
