= Kristen Nygaard (footballer) =

Danish footballer (born 1949)

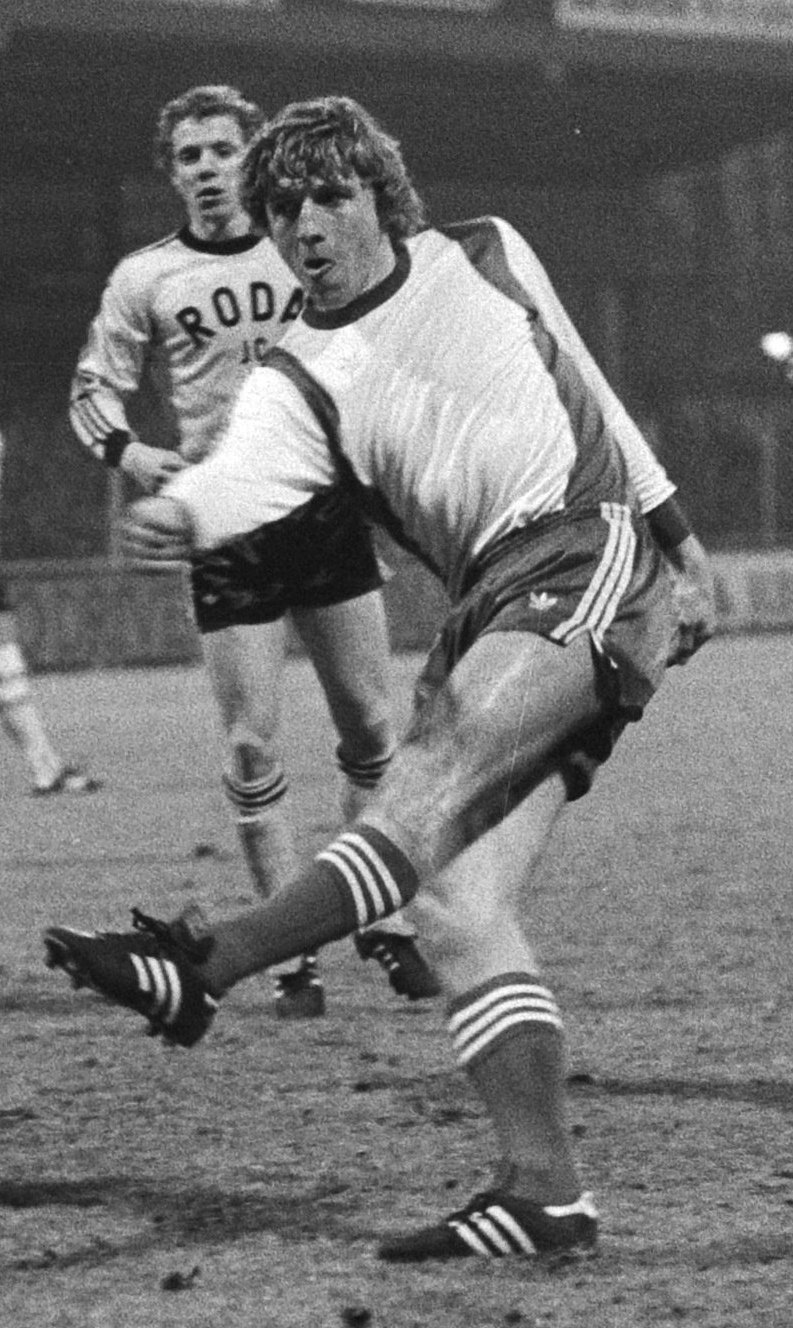
- Nygaard in 1979

Personal information
- Full name: Kristen Nygaard Kristensen
- Date of birth: 9 September 1949 (age 77)
- Place of birth: Sunds, Denmark
- Position: Forward

Youth career
- Holstebro BK

Senior career*
Years	Team	Apps	(Gls)
1969–1972	IHF Aarhus		
1972–1982	AZ Alkmaar	363	(104)
1983-1984	Nîmes	37	(6)
- Uzès
- Morières

International career
1969–1970	Denmark u-21	5	(1)
1970–1979	Denmark	36	(11)

Managerial career
- 1986–1987: Nîmes
- * Club domestic league appearances and goals

Kristen Nygaard Kristensen (born 9 September 1949) is a Danish former professional footballer who played for Dutch team AZ Alkmaar and several French clubs. He scored 11 goals in 36 games for the Denmark national team, and represented Denmark at the 1972 Summer Olympics.

== Career ==
Born in Sunds near Herning, Nygaard started playing football with Holstebro BK. He moved to IHF Aarhus, whom he helped win promotion from the Danish 3rd Division in 1969, by scoring 25 goals in 22 league games. He scored 15 goals in the 1970 Danish 2nd Division season, and was called up for the Danish national team in July 1970. He played on for IHF Aarhus, but could not win promotion for the top-flight Danish 1st Division with the team.

Nygaard was included in the Danish 1972 Olympic squad, and played six games and scored one goal at the 1972 Olympic football tournament. He played a further national team game in October 1972, before moving abroad to play professionally for AZ Alkmaar in the Dutch Eredivisie championship. He played his last Danish national team game in November 1979. With Alkmaar, he reached the finals of the international 1980–81 UEFA Cup tournament, which the team lost to English club Ipswich Town on aggregate. He left Alkmaar to play his career out in France, first playing at Nîmes Olympique, before ending his career at smaller French clubs.

After retiring from the active game, he went on to coach Nîmes Olympique from 1986 to 1987. In 1994, he was seriously injured in a traffic accident. He spent eight weeks in a coma afterwards and still has grave health problems. Two years later his old club AZ held a benefit match for him. The merchandise shop in the AFAS Stadion is named after Nygaard.

== Honours ==
- Eredivisie: 1981
- KNVB Cup: 1978, 1981, 1982
