= Deaths in February 1991 =

The following is a list of notable deaths in February 1991.

Entries for each day are listed alphabetically by surname. A typical entry lists information in the following sequence:

- Name, age, country of citizenship at birth, subsequent country of citizenship (if applicable), reason for notability, cause of death (if known), and reference.

== February 1991 ==
=== 1 ===
- Sam Busich, 77, American football player (Boston Redskins, Cleveland Rams, Detroit Lions).
- Carol Dempster, 89, American silent film actress, heart failure.
- Shiro Kuramata, 56, Japanese interior designer.
- Jimmy MacDonald, 84, Scottish-American voice actor (Mickey Mouse) and sound effects designer, heart failure.
- Herzl Rosenblum, 87, Lithuanian-born Israeli journalist.
- Oscar Rudolph, 79, American television director, complications from a stroke.
- Phil Watson, 76, Canadian ice hockey player and coach (New York Rangers).

=== 2 ===
- Pete Axthelm, 47, American sports journalist, liver failure.
- Maurice G. Burnside, 88, American politician, member of the U.S. House of Representatives (1949–1953, 1955–1957).
- Lorang Christiansen, 74, Norwegian Olympic cyclist (1948, 1952).
- Jack Daugherty, 60, American musician, complications from heart surgery.
- Alan Green, 79, British politician.
- Hans Jamnig, 78, Austrian Olympic cross-country skier (1936).
- Al Johnson, 77, American basketball player.
- Natalie Kingston, 85, American actress.
- Franco Latini, 63, Italian actor and voice actor, stroke.
- Howie Rader, 69, American basketball player.
- Stanislav Sorokin, 49, Soviet Olympic boxer (1964).
- Aryness Joy Wickens, 90, American statistician.

=== 3 ===
- Harry Ackerman, 78, American television producer (Bewitched, The Flying Nun, Hazel).
- Walter Brown, 75, American baseball player (St. Louis Browns).
- Augusto Cantón, 62, Argentine Olympic swimmer (1948).
- Ernst Kalwitzki, 81, German football player.
- Nancy Kulp, 69, American actress (The Beverly Hillbillies, The Aristocats, The Parent Trap), cancer.

=== 4 ===
- Juozas Baltušis, 81, Lithuanian writer.
- Károly Bartha, 83, Hungarian Olympic swimmer (1924).
- Harry Carey, 75, Australian rules footballer.
- Johannes Pløger, 68, Danish football player and Olympian (1948).
- Harry Lancaster Towe, 92, American politician, member of the U.S. House of Representatives (1943–1951).
- Eleni Skoura, 94, Greek politician.

=== 5 ===
- Pedro Arrupe, 83, Spanish Jesuit priest.
- Lawrence Gowing, 72, English artist, heart attack.
- Dean Jagger, 87, American actor (Twelve O'Clock High, White Christmas, Mr. Novak), Oscar winner (1950).
- James L. Knight, 81, American newspaper publisher.
- Lennart Moberg, 72, Swedish Olympic triple jumper (1948).
- Margarethe von Oven, 86, German secretary and 20 July plot accomplice.
- Laurie Slack, 75, Australian rules footballer.

=== 6 ===
- John Paul Elford, 68, American Roman Catholic prelate.
- Salvador Luria, 78, Italian-American microbiologist, Nobel Prize recipient (1969), heart attack.
- Bassett Maguire, 86, American botanist, kidney failure.
- Alex McColl, 96, American baseball player (Washington Senators).
- George McNaughton, 93, Canadian ice hockey player.
- Danny Thomas, 79, American actor (The Danny Thomas Show, The Jazz Singer, Big City) and philanthropist, Emmy winner (1955), heart attack.
- María Zambrano, 86, Spanish writer.

=== 7 ===
- Otto Friedrich Bollnow, 87, German philosopher.
- George Detore, 84, American baseball player (Cleveland Indians).
- John War Eagle, 89, American Sioux actor (Tonka, Tomahawk, Westward Ho, the Wagons!).
- Werner Fuetterer, 84, German actor.
- John Guise, 76, Papua New Guinean politician, governor-general (1975–1977).
- Don McDougall, 73, American television director (The Virginian, Bonanza, The Dukes of Hazzard).
- Jean-Paul Mousseau, 64, Canadian artist.
- John Steinbeck IV, 44, American journalist, complications from spinal surgery.
- Dick Winslow, 75, American actor (Tom Sawyer, King Creole, The Apple Dumpling Gang), diabetes.
- Amos Yarkoni, 70, Bedouin-Israeli military officer and civil servant, cancer.

=== 8 ===
- Aris T. Allen, 80, American politician, suicide.
- Hubert M. Blalock, Jr., 64, American sociologist.
- Miran Bux, 83, Pakistani cricket player.
- Silvio O. Conte, 69, American politician, member of the U.S. House of Representatives (since 1959), prostate cancer.
- Frank Crapper, 79, Australian rules footballer.
- Bob Drummond, 71, Australian rules footballer.
- Daphne Jackson, 54, English nuclear physicist, cancer.
- James Jacoby, 57, American bridge player, cancer.
- Casimir Lewy, 71, Polish philosopher.
- Evan Luard, 64, English politician.
- Teuvo Ojala, 43, Finnish Olympic wrestler (1968).
- Aaron Siskind, 87, American photographer, stroke.
- Ron Todd, 74, Australian rules footballer.

=== 9 ===
- James Cleveland, 59, American gospel singer, heart failure.
- John Sloan Dickey, 83, American academic.
- Walter Klien, 62, Austrian pianist.
- Daigoro Kondo, 83, Japanese footballer, intracranial hemorrhage.
- Fatma Memik, 87-88, Turkish politician.
- Arkady Migdal, 79, Soviet physicist and member of the USSR Academy of Sciences.
- Henry Oehler, 74, American Olympic handball player (1936).
- Ervin Pringle, 80, Canadian politician, member of the House of Commons of Canada (1968–1972).
- Edward H. Schafer, 77, American historian, liver cancer.
- Cliff Shaw, 68, American programmer.

=== 10 ===
- Fernand Blaise, 66, Belgian footballer.
- William Foley, 59, Australian Roman Catholic archbishop.
- Rowe Harding, 89, Welsh rugby player.
- Bernard Lee, 55, American civil rights activist, heart failure.
- Marion Roper, 80, American Olympic diver (1932).
- Marcel Tolkowsky, 91, Belgian diamond cutter.
- Valery Zubanov, 39, Soviet Olympic sailor (1972, 1976, 1980).

=== 11 ===
- Ricardo Gullón, 82, Spanish writer.
- Bohumil Kudrna, 70, Czechoslovak Olympic canoeist (1948, 1952).
- Ruth Landes, 82, American anthropologist.
- Pete Parker, 95, Canadian radio announcer.
- Ernest Shabaylo, 59, Soviet Russian Olympic equestrian (1960).

=== 12 ===
- Wilhelm Brinkmann, 80, German Olympic handball player (1936).
- Liu Chieh, 83, Taiwanese diplomat, cerebral hemorrhage.
- Norman Fisher, 74, New Zealand Olympic boxer (1936).
- Eugène Kuborn, 88, Luxembourgian Olympic swimmer and water polo player (1924, 1928).
- Robert Livermore, 81, American Olympic alpine skier (1936).
- Ruth Morley, 65, Austrian-American costume designer (Superman, Taxi Driver, Tootsie), breast cancer.
- Roger Patterson, 22, American bassist (Atheist), traffic collision.
- Robert F. Wagner, 80, American politician, mayor of New York City (1954–1965), bladder cancer.
- Jerzy Wostal, 76, Polish footballer and Olympian (1936).

=== 13 ===
- Arno Breker, 90, German architect and sculptor.
- Gunnar Hultgren, 88, Swedish archbishop.
- Flaviano Labò, 64, Italian singer, traffic collision.
- Ron Pickering, 60, British sports commentator.
- Georg Moritz, Hereditary Prince of Saxe-Altenburg, 90, German royal, head of the house of Saxe-Altenburg (since 1955).
- Fred Taylor, 72, Australian rules footballer.
- Heinz Willeg, 72, German film producer.

=== 14 ===
- Alex Clark, 74, American politician, head injury.
- Felix Gilbert, 85, German-American historian.
- Harry Johns, 87, Australian rules footballer.
- Pafsanias Katsotas, 95, Greek Army general and politician.
- Alfred R. Lindesmith, 85, American sociologist.
- John A. McCone, 89, American politician, Director of Central Intelligence (1961–1965), cardiac arrest.
- Kim Slavin, 62, Soviet and Russian painter.
- José Ádem, 69, Mexican mathematician.

=== 15 ===
- Virginia Mae Brown, 67, American civil servant, heart attack.
- Alfred Gleisner, 82, German politician.
- Julio González, 70, Cuban baseball player (Washington Senators).
- David Herlihy, 60, American historian.
- Birger Malmsten, 70, Swedish actor.
- Tillie Manton, 80, American football player (New York Giants, Washington Redskins).
- George Motola, 71, American record producer.
- Ernest Robert Sears, 80, American agricultural geneticist.
- Ivan Shkadov, 77, Soviet general, traffic accident.
- Earl E. T. Smith, 87, American politician and diplomat.
- István Ströck, 90, Romanian Olympic footballer (1924).

=== 16 ===
- Enrique Bermúdez, 58, Nicaraguan soldier, shot.
- Bob Geddins, 78, American musician, liver cancer.
- Luis Escobar Kirkpatrick, 82, Spanish actor and noble.
- Bobby Maples, 48, American football player (Houston Oilers, Denver Broncos, Pittsburgh Steelers), Hodgkin's lymphoma.
- Didar Sandhu, 48, Indian folk singer and songwriter.

=== 17 ===
- Gitta Alpár, 88, Hungarian-American opera singer.
- Madina Gulgun, 65, Iranian-Soviet poet.
- Sidney Hinds, 90, American Army officer and Olympic sports shooter (1924).
- Louis O. Kelso, 77, American economist.
- Miroslav Macháček, 68, Czechoslovak actor.
- Jean Palluch, 67, French football player and Olympian (1948).
- Francis Pearson, 79, British politician and colonial administrator.
- Hans Thimig, 90, Austrian actor and director.
- Travis Williams, 45, American football player (Green Bay Packers, Los Angeles Rams), heart failure.

=== 18 ===
- Liu Chi-Sheng, 76, Chinese pilot, intracerebral hemorrhage.
- Francesc de Borja Moll i Casasnovas, 87, Spanish linguist.
- Eugene Fodor, 85, Hungarian-American writer.
- Dick Hart, 63, American Olympic long-distance runner (1956).
- Zdzisław Mordarski, 68, Polish footballer.
- Fulke Walwyn, 80, British jockey.
- Zhang Wenjin, 76, Chinese diplomat.

=== 19 ===
- Fad Browne, 84, Irish politician.
- Arne Kleven, 91, Danish footballer.
- Herbert Niemann, 55, German Olympic judoka (1964), suicide.
- Milton S. Plesset, 83, American physicist.
- Francis D. Rauber, 89, United States Marine Corps Sergeant Major.

=== 20 ===
- Sir George Clark, 3rd Baronet, 77, Northern Irish politician.
- Isabelle Delorme, 90, Canadian composer.
- John Fetzer, 89, American sports executive.
- Eugene Forsey, 86, Canadian politician.
- Kenneth Hurlstone Jackson, 81, English linguist.
- George Lennon, 90, Irish-American buddhist and republican leader.
- Neil Tompkins, 64, Australian rules footballer.

=== 21 ===
- Dorothy Auchterlonie, 75, English-born Australian poet.
- John Sherman Cooper, 89, American politician and diplomat, member of the U.S. Senate (1946–1949, 1952–1955, 1956–1973), heart failure.
- Margot Fonteyn, 71, English ballerina, ovarian cancer.
- Oscar Christian Gundersen, 82, Norwegian politician.
- Mordechai Ish-Shalom, 90, Israeli politician and labor leader.
- Nutan, 54, Indian actress, breast cancer.
- Frederick J. Pohl, 101, American author.
- Abdurrahman Sharafkandi, 69, Iranian writer.
- Flemming Vögg, 76, Danish Olympic fencer (1948).

=== 22 ===
- Joe Craig, 72, American baseball player.
- Ladislav Fialka, 59, Czechoslovak mime.
- Cyril Hawker, 90, English banker and cricketer.
- Eric Hosking, 81, English photographer.
- William Loose, 80, American composer, heart attack.
- Jimmy Pattison, 82, American baseball player (Brooklyn Robins).
- Atanasie Protopopesco, 90, Romanian Olympic footballer (1924).

=== 23 ===
- John Alfred Hannah, 88, American academic.
- Argeliers León, 72, Cuban composer and musicologist.
- Leo Thomas Maher, 75, American Roman Catholic prelate, brain cancer.
- Gösta Persson, 87, Swedish Olympic swimmer (1924, 1936).
- William Howard Taft III, 75, American diplomat, prostate cancer.
- Frank Traynor, 86, Irish Olympic boxer (1928).

=== 24 ===
- Georges Capdeville, 91, French football referee.
- John Charles Daly, 77, American journalist and television personality, cardiac arrest, heart attack.
- Robert B. Downs, 87, American librarian.
- George Gobel, 71, American actor and comedian.
- Shingo Kanemoto, 58, Japanese voice actor, intracerebral hemorrhage.
- Ned Kick, 86, Australian rules footballer.
- Stewart Morris, 81, British Olympic sailor (1948).
- Joe Munson, 91, American baseball player (Chicago Cubs).
- Webb Pierce, 69, American musician, pancreatic cancer.
- Héctor Rial, 62, Argentine football player.
- Jean Rogers, 74, American actress, surgical complications.
- Martin Sharp, 73, British Olympic sailor (1952).
- Lina Volonghi, 76, Italian actress.
- Hans-Joachim Weise, 78, German Olympic sailor (1936).

=== 25 ===
- Albino Baldan, 66, Italian Olympic rower (1952).
- John Dunning, 74, American film editor (Ben-Hur, Julius Caesar, Dr. Kildare), Oscar winner (1960).
- Sverre Hansen, 91, Norwegian Olympic long jumper (1924).
- Suleiman Ali Nashnush, 47-48, Libyan basketball player.
- Otto Tibulski, 78, German footballer.
- André Turp, 65, Canadian singer.

=== 26 ===
- Bernard W. Burton, 92, American film editor.
- Abraham Charité, 73, Dutch Olympic weightlifter (1948, 1952).
- Slim Gaillard, 80, American musician, cancer.
- Han Lih-wu, 88, Taiwanese diplomat.
- William McMahon, 81, American Olympic long-distance runner (1936).
- Tadeusz Śliwak, 82, Polish Olympic sprinter (1936).
- Emmett Wilson, 78, American baseball player.
- Jimmy Zinn, 96, American baseball player (Philadelphia Athletics, Pittsburgh Pirates, Cleveland Indians).

=== 27 ===
- Owen Dougherty, 61, American sports coach, complications from heart surgery.
- Florence Gilbert, 87, American silent film actress.
- Clarence Griffin, 79, American baseball player.
- Johnny Jennings, 79, Australian rules footballer.
- Leo Katcher, 79, American reporter, heart attack.
- Martinho da Costa Lopes, 73, East Timorese religious and political leader.
- Artie Mitchell, 45, American pornographer, shot.
- Bob Widlar, 53, American electronics engineer, heart attack.

=== 28 ===
- Peter Bawden, 62, Canadian oilman and politician, member of the House of Commons of Canada (1972–1979).
- Reinhard Bendix, 75, German-American sociologist, heart attack.
- Edward Gunston, 77, Australian cricketer.
- Wassily Hoeffding, 76, Finnish-American statistician.
- Prince Wenzel of Liechtenstein, 28, Liechtenstein royal.
- Sante Monachesi, 81, Italian painter.
- Berger Torrissen, 89, American Olympic skier (1936).
- Guillermo Ungo, 59, Salvadoran politician.
- Werner Wägelin, 77, Swiss Olympic cyclist (1936).
- Othello Zavaroni, 80, French architect.
