= Deaths in January 2005 =

The following is a list of notable deaths in January 2005.

Entries for each day are listed alphabetically by surname. A typical entry lists information in the following sequence:

- Name, age, country of citizenship at birth, subsequent country of citizenship (if applicable), reason for notability, cause of death (if known), and reference.

== January 2005 ==
=== 1 ===
- Harold Bodle, 84, English footballer (Birmingham City F.C., Bury F.C., Stockport County F.C. and Accrington Stanley F.C.).
- Shirley Chisholm, 80, American politician, first black woman ever to serve in the U.S. Congress.
- Robert Fortier, 78, American actor.
- Hugh Lawson, 6th Baron Burnham, 73, British newspaper executive, peer, and Deputy Speaker of the House of Lords.
- Bob Matsui, 63, American Democratic Party member of the House of Representatives (1979- ), cancer.
- Dmitry Nelyubin, 33, Russian cyclist and Olympian (1988, 1992), murdered.
- Patrick Denis O'Donnell, 82, Irish military historian and army officer.
- Alfred Rinesch, 93, Austrian architect.
- Willem Scholten, 77, Dutch politician and economist.
- Dewanishiki Tadao, 79, Japanese sumo wrestler.

=== 2 ===
- Reine Andersson, 59, Swedish Olympic sailor (1976).
- Arnold Denker, 90, American chess player, brain cancer.
- Cyril Fletcher, 91, British comedian (That's Life!).
- Frank Kelly Freas, 82, American science fiction artist.
- Félix Galimi, 84, Argentine Olympic fencer (1948, 1952, 1964).
- Margaret Gardiner, 100, British art collector and left wing political activist.
- Paul Manning, 45, American television writer (ER, L.A. Law), colorectal cancer.
- Maclyn McCarty, 93, American geneticist and DNA research pioneer, heart failure.
- Heitor Medina, 94, Brazilian Olympic javelin thrower (1932).
- Claude Meillassoux, 79, French neo-Marxist economic anthropologist and Africanist.
- Edo Murtić, 83, Croatian painter.
- C. M. Pennington-Richards, 93, British film director and cinematographer.
- Luis Prais, 79, Uruguayan footballer.
- Antoine Puttaert, 85, Belgian footballer.
- Ngo Van, 93, Vietnamese revolutionary.
- Charles Paul Wilp, 72, German advertising-designer, artist, and photographer.
- John Ziman, 79, British-New Zealand physicist and humanist.

=== 3 ===
- Ingrid Andersson, 80, Swedish Olympic gymnast (1948).
- Kerstin Bohman, 90, Swedish Olympic gymnast (1948).
- Koo Chen-fu, 88, Chinese negotiator with the People's Republic of China, renal cancer.
- Paul Darragh, 51, Irish Olympic equestrian showjumper (1988, 1992), heart failure.
- Jyotindra Nath Dixit, 68, Indian national security adviser and former foreign secretary, heart attack.
- Will Eisner, 87, American comic book artist (The Spirit), complications following surgery.
- Misael Escuti, 78, Chilean football player, cardiovascular disease.
- Helge Forsberg, 84, Finnish Olympic rower (1948).
- Warren J. Kemmerling, 80, American actor.
- Mehmet Faruk Sükan, 84, Turkish physician, politician and government minister.
- László Vadász, 56, Hungarian chess grandmaster.
- Kay Williamson, 69, British linguist, heart attack.

=== 4 ===
- Ali Al-Haidri, Iraqi governor of Baghdad province, assassinated.
- Humphrey Carpenter, 58, British biographer and broadcaster, heart attack.
- Guy Davenport, 77, American writer, translator, illustrator, and painter, lung cancer.
- Beulah Anne Georges, 81, American baseball player.
- Frank Harary, 83, American mathematician, a foremost expert on graph theory.
- Robert Heilbroner, 85, American economist.
- Marguerite Pearson, 72, American professional baseball player (AAGPBL).
- Bud Poile, 80, Canadian professional ice hockey player, member of Hockey Hall of Fame, Parkinson's disease.
- Jack Sanford, 87, American baseball player (Washington Senators).
- Alton Tobey, 90, American muralist and painter.
- Jorge Eduardo Wright, 82, Argentine mycologist.
- Tevfik Yüce, 77-78, Turkish Olympic wrestler (1952).

=== 5 ===
- Antoni Barwiński, 81, Polish footballer.
- Antonio Benítez-Rojo, 73, Cuban writer.
- Gabrielle Daye, 93, English stage actress.
- Martín Acosta y Lara, 79, Uruguayan basketball player and Olympian (1948, 1952).
- Tore Johannessen, 82, Norwegian ice hockey referee and sports administrator.
- René Le Hénaff, 103, French film editor and director.
- Sean, 69, American cartoonist, lung cancer.
- Bob Smith, 75, American football player (Texas A&M Aggies, Detroit Lions).
- Danny Sugerman, 50, American music manager, lung cancer.

=== 6 ===
- Vern Barberis, 76, Australian weightlifter and Olympic medalist (1952, 1956).
- Bud Brooks, 74, American football player (Arkansas Razorbacks, Detroit Lions).
- Sergio Fubini, 76, Italian theoretical physicist.
- Jean-Luc Fugaldi, 58, French footballer.
- Ronald 'Bo' Ginn, 70, American politician, member of the United States House of Representatives (1973-1983), lung cancer.
- Lois Hole, 75, Canadian businesswoman, author and politician, Lieutenant Governor of Alberta, cancer.
- Makgatho Mandela, 54, South African last surviving son of Nelson Mandela, AIDS.
- Josef Musil, 84, Austrian footballer and Olympian (1948).
- Tarquinio Provini, 71, Italian motorcycle road racer.
- Louis Robichaud, 79, Canadian former premier of New Brunswick.
- Nicholas Scott, 71, British politician.
- Boris Shtokolov, 74, Soviet and Russian singer.
- Ali Shukri, 85, Yugoslav-Kosovan politician, President of the Executive Council (1963–1967) and Presidency (1981–1982).
- Sindhu, 33, Indian actress, lung infection.
- Nora Strømstad, 95, Norwegian Olympic alpine skier (1936).
- A. Hays Town, 101, American architect.

=== 7 ===
- Harry Boyles, 93, American baseball player (Chicago White Sox).
- Evgeny Chuprun, 77, Soviet and Russian realist painter.
- Pierre Daninos, 91, French novelist (The Diary of Major Thompson).
- Rosemary Kennedy, 86, American sister of John F. Kennedy.
- András Kormos, 52, Hungarian Olympic rower (1972, 1980).
- Ivar Medaas, 66, Norwegian folksinger and fiddle player.
- Aleksandr Prokhorov, 58, Soviet footballer (Dynamo Kyiv, FC Spartak Moscow) and Olympian (1976).
- José Vegazzi, 75, Argentine Olympic swimmer (1948).

=== 8 ===
- Badja Djola, 56, American actor (Mississippi Burning, The Hurricane, The Last Boy Scout), heart attack.
- Tage Fahlborg, 92, Swedish Olympic sprint canoeist (1936).
- Jacqueline Joubert, 83, French television announcer, producer and director.
- Suvad Katana, 35, Bosnian footballer, heart attack.
- Friedrich Kuhn, 85, West German bobsledder and Olympic champion (1952).
- Aksella Luts, 99, Estonian screenwriter, actress and filmmaker.
- Rodney Mann, 75, British Olympic bobsledder (1956).
- Song Renqiong, 95, Chinese general and politician.
- David Shaw, 50, Australian scuba diver, drowned.
- Michel Thomas, 90, Polish-American linguist, decorated war veteran and nazi hunter.

=== 9 ===
- Luis Alers, 54, Puerto Rican Olympic sprinter (1972).
- Jean Robert Beaulé, 77, Canadian politician, member of the House of Commons of Canada (1962-1965).
- Artidoro Berti, 84, Italian Olympic runner (1952).
- Gonzalo Gavira, 79, Mexican sound effects creator (The Exorcist, The Towering Inferno).
- Joanne Grant, 74, American journalist and communist activist.
- Koji Hashimoto, 68, Japanese film director.
- Antonín Klimek, 67, Czech historian.
- Bob Mabe, 75, American baseball player (St. Louis Cardinals, Cincinnati Reds, Baltimore Orioles).
- Ricky Rodriguez, 29, American member of a religious cult "The Family", suicide by gunshot.
- Michael P. Ryan, 88, United States Marine Corps major general.
- Vantile Whitfield, 74, American arts administrator, Alzheimer's disease.

=== 10 ===
- Gene Baylos, 98, American comedian.
- Princess Joséphine-Charlotte of Belgium, 77, Belgian Princess of Belgium and Grand Duchess of Luxembourg, cancer.
- Ed Campion, 89, American basketball player.
- Georges Bernier, 75, French humorist.
- Margherita Carosio, 96, Italian soprano.
- Fernand Cazenave, 80, French rugby player and national coach.
- Tommy Fine, 90, American Major League Baseball player (Boston Red Sox and St. Louis Browns).
- James Forman, 76, American executive secretary of the Student Nonviolent Coordinating Committee, colorectal cancer.
- Stephen Hastings, 83, British politician, MP for Mid Bedfordshire (1960–1983), esophageal cancer.
- Erwin Hillier, 93, British cinematographer.
- Ursula Hoff, 95, Australian scholar and author on art.
- Kalevi Hämäläinen, 72, Finnish cross-country skier and Olympic champion (1956, 1960, 1964).
- Helmut Losch, 57, East German heavyweight weightlifting champion and Olympian (1972, 1976).
- Jan Pieter Schotte, 76, Belgian official of the Roman Curia, cardinal since 1994.
- Inna Tumanyan, 75, Soviet-Armenian film director and screenwriter.
- Arthur Walworth, 101, American writer and biographer.
- Hans Zollner, 75, Austrian Olympic ice hockey player (1956).

=== 11 ===
- Alessandro Ruspoli, 9th Prince of Cerveteri, 80, Italian aristocrat, actor and socialite.
- Spencer Dryden, 66, American drummer (Jefferson Airplane), cancer.
- Jimmy Griffin, 61, American singer, guitarist, songwriter, member of rock band Bread, cancer.
- Miriam Hyde, 91, Australian composer (Valley of Rocks).
- Tim Jecko, 66, American swimmer and Olympian (1956).
- Fabrizio Meoni, 47, Italian motorcyclist, motorcycle accident.
- Jerzy Pawłowski, 72, Polish fencer and Olympic champion (1952, 1956, 1960, 1964, 1968, 1972).
- Thelma White, 94, American actress (Reefer Madness), pneumonia.
- Gordon Willoughby, 79, Australian rugby league footballer.
- Tanja Žutić, 77, Slovenian Olympic gymnast (1948, 1952).

=== 12 ===
- Domiciano Cavém, 72, Portuguese football player and manager, Alzheimer's disease.
- Gaston Clermont, 91, Canadian businessman and politician, member of the House of Commons of Canada (1960-1963, 1965-1979).
- Kenneth Farmer, 92, Canadian Olympic ice hockey player (1936), and sports administrator.
- Leila Fawzi, 86, Egyptian actress and model.
- Manfred Fuhrmann, 79, German classical philologist and academic.
- Herbert Goldstein, 82, American physicist.
- Luther Goldman, 95, American naturalist.
- Tullio Gonnelli, 92, Italian athlete and Olympic silver medalist (1936).
- Bernard Meadows, 89, British modernist sculptor.
- Amrish Puri, 72, Indian actor (Indiana Jones and the Temple of Doom, Mr. India, Gandhi), cerebral hemorrhage.
- Jay Schulberg, 65, American advertising executive, pancreatic cancer.
- Alexander Scott, 84, British architect.
- Francisc Șimon, 78, Romanian Olympic water polo player (1952, 1956).
- Rocky Uguccioni, 86, American football player (Brooklyn Tigers).
- Edmund S. Valtman, 90, Estonian-American Pulitzer Prize-winning political cartoonist.

=== 13 ===
- Earl Cameron, 89, Canadian broadcaster and The National anchor (1959–1966).
- John Hunt, 70, Australian rower and Olympian (1960).
- Jacques de Tonnancour, 88, Canadian artist and art educator from Montreal, Quebec.
- Louis Peniston, 85, American politician.
- Nell Rankin, 81, United States mezzo-soprano opera singer (Metropolitan Opera).
- K. V. Sarma, 85, Indian historian of science.
- Hisham Sharabi, 78, American cultural historian and political activist, cancer.
- Bub Strickler, 66, American racing driver.

=== 14 ===
- Irma de Antequeda, 84, Argentine Olympic fencer (1948).
- Ward Beysen, 63, Belgian politician and freemason, suicide by drowning.
- Edwin Bélanger, 94, Canadian conductor and musician.
- Ofelia Guilmáin, 83, Spanish actress (The Exterminating Angel, Nazarín, The Brainiac), pneumonia.
- Charlotte MacLeod, 82, American mystery writer, Alzheimer's disease.
- Conroy Maddox, 92, British surrealist painter.
- Rudolph Moshammer, 64, German fashion designer, homicide.
- Carl Möhner, 83, Austrian film actor (Rififi, He Who Must Die, Sink the Bismarck!), director, screenwriter and painter, Parkinson's disease.
- Rocky Roberts, 63, American-Italian rhythm and blues singer ("Stasera mi butto").
- Jesús Rafael Soto, 81, Venezuelan kinetic artist.

=== 15 ===
- Felix Aprahamian, 90, English music critic.
- Leonid Brekhovskikh, 87, Russian scientist.
- Deem Bristow, 57, American actor.
- Terry Crowley, 51, New Zealand linguist of Oceanic languages.
- Walter Ernsting, 84, German science fiction author (Perry Rhodan).
- William Hare, 69, Canadian Olympic sports shooter (1964, 1968, 1972).
- Elizabeth Janeway, 91, American feminist author.
- Dan Lee, 35, Canadian animator (Finding Nemo, Monsters, Inc., Toy Story 2), heart failure.
- Werner Lesser, 72, East German Olympic ski jumper (1956, 1960).
- Ruth Warrick, 89, American actress (Citizen Kane, All My Children, Song of the South), pneumonia.
- Karapetê Xaço, 104, Armenian singer of traditional Kurdish Dengbêj music.
- Victoria de los Ángeles, 81, Spanish soprano, heart attack.

=== 16 ===
- William Brigden, 88, Canadian Olympic canoeist (1952).
- H. Bentley Glass, 98, American biologist, known for controversial views.
- Agustín González, 74, Spanish film actor, pneumonia.
- Yoshito Matsushige, 92, Japanese photojournalist.
- Jerzy Pławczyk, 93, Polish Olympic high jumper (1932, 1936).
- Arvi Tervalampi, 76, Finnish Olympic equestrian (1956).
- Gudrun Wegner, 49, East German swimmer and Olympian (1972), cancer.
- Marjorie Williams, 47, American journalist. The Washington Post columnist and contributing editor for Vanity Fair, liver cancer.

=== 17 ===
- Maria Albuleț, 72, Romanian chess Woman Grandmaster.
- Charlie Bell, 44, Australian business executive, CEO of McDonald's, colon cancer.
- Bezerra da Silva, 77, Brazilian samba musician.
- Don Griffin, 82, American football player (Illinois Fighting Illini, Chicago Rockets).
- Basil Hoskins, 75, English theatre and film actor.
- Anatoly Kartashov, 67, Russian water polo player and Olympic silver medalist (1960).
- Virginia Mayo, 84, American film actress (White Heat, The Best Years of Our Lives), heart attack.
- Albert Schatz, 84, American microbiologist, discoverer of streptomycin, pancreatic cancer.
- George P. L. Walker, 78, British volcanologist.
- Hansjoachim Walther, 65, German politician and mathematician.
- Zhao Ziyang, 85, Chinese politician, Communist Party General Secretary (1987-1989), complications of multiple strokes.

=== 18 ===
- Charles Thurston Brockman, 77, American broadcaster and president of the United States Auto Club (1969-1972).
- Gabrielle Brune, 92, British actress.
- Vivian H. H. Green, 89, British priest and historian.
- Robert Moch, 90, American rower and Olympian (1936).
- Harold Stafford, 83, Canadian politician, member of the House of Commons of Canada (1965-1972).
- Pez Whatley, 54, American professional wrestler, heart attack.

=== 19 ===
- Theodore W. Allen, 85, American scholar, writer, and activist.
- Bill Andersen, 80, New Zealand communist and trade union leader.
- Lamont Bentley, 31, American actor (Moesha) and rapper, traffic collision.
- Cal Bolder, 73, American actor.
- Jens-Halvard Bratz, 84, Norwegian businessman and politician.
- Carlos Cortez, 81, American artist and political activist.
- K. Sello Duiker, 30, South African novelist, suicide by hanging.
- Ray Ebli, 85, American football player (Chicago Cardinals, Buffalo Bisons, Chicago Rockets).
- James Holden, 84, American actor.
- Anita Kulcsár, 28, Hungarian handball player and Olympic silver medalist (2000, 2004), traffic collision.
- Rinat Mardanshin, 41, Russian motorcycle speedway rider, complications during surgery.
- Joop Odenthal, 80, Dutch footballer, manager, and Olympian (1952).
- Stan West, 78, American gridiron football player (Los Angeles Rams, New York Giants, Chicago Cardinals).

=== 20 ===
- Parveen Babi, 50, Indian actress, diabetes.
- Ivor G. Balding, 96, American polo player.
- Bogle, 40, Jamaican dancer, homicide.
- Per Borten, 91, Norwegian politician, prime minister of Norway (1965-1971).
- Dick Gallagher, 49, American composer, predominantly for off-Broadway productions.
- Solomon King, 74, American singer, cancer.
- Jan Nowak-Jeziorański, 91, Polish journalist and decorated World War II hero, head of the Radio Free Europe Polish section.
- Miriam Rothschild, 96, British zoologist, entomologist and author.
- Hamdan Sheikh Tahir, 81, Malaysian politician, governor of Penang (1989-2001).

=== 21 ===
- Jacques Andrieux, 87, French fighter pilot during World War II.
- Walter Behrends, 75, Argentine-Chilean footballer.
- René Devos, 83, Belgian footballer.
- Theun de Vries, 97, Dutch writer.
- Ole Due, 73, Danish jurist and judge.
- Leonel Gabriel, 85, Uruguayan Olympic water polo player (1948).
- John L. Hess, 87, American journalist.
- Henry Källgren, 73, Swedish football player.
- Václav Kubička, 65, Czech Olympic gymnast (1964, 1968).
- Edward F. McLaughlin, Jr., 84, American attorney and politician.
- Kaljo Raid, 83, Estonian composer, cellist and pastor.
- Neville Scott, 69, New Zealand Olympic runner (1956, 1964).
- Steve Susskind, 62, American voice-over actor, traffic collision.
- Corky Valentine, 76, American baseball player (Cincinnati Redlegs).

=== 22 ===
- William Deakin, 91, British World War II hero and founder of St Antony's College, Oxford.
- César Gutiérrez, 61, Venezuelan baseball player (San Francisco Giants, Detroit Tigers).
- Lloyd Montour, 79, Canadian Olympic rower (1952).
- Patsy Rowlands, 74, British actress, known for her roles in the Carry On films, breast cancer.
- William Trager, 94, American parasitologist.
- Consuelo Velázquez, 88, Mexican songwriter and lyricist, author of the song "Bésame Mucho".
- Rose Mary Woods, 87, American politician, former secretary of Richard Nixon and key Watergate figure.

=== 23 ===
- Harley Baldwin, 59, American land developer and art dealer, kidney cancer.
- Morys Bruce, 4th Baron Aberdare, 85, British politician and peer, Deputy Speaker of the House of Lords.
- Johnny Carson, 79, United States comedian and television host, emphysema.
- Douglas Knight, 83, American educator, businessman, author, former president of Lawrence University and Duke University.
- Charles Martin, 45, American gridiron football player (Green Bay Packers, Houston Oilers, Atlanta Falcons), kidney failure.
- Henry Mentz, 84, American district judge (United States District Court for the Eastern District of Louisiana).
- Mutsuko Sakura, 83, Japanese actress.
- Eddie Sinclair, 67, Scottish snooker player.

=== 24 ===
- June Bronhill, 75, Australian actress and opera, operetta and musical comedy singer, Alzheimer's disease.
- Else Krüger, 89, German secretary of nazi official Martin Bormann during World War II.
- Lloyd Mohns, 83, Canadian ice hockey player (New York Rangers).
- Paritala Ravindra, 46, Indian politician, homicide.
- Lev Saychuk, 81, Soviet Olympic fencer (1952, 1956).
- Leslie Wood, 72, English footballer.

=== 25 ===
- Renzo Accordi, 74, Italian racing cyclist.
- William Augustus Bootle, 102, American district judge (United States District Court for the Middle District of Georgia).
- Barbara Craig, 89, British archaeologist, classicist, and academic, specialising in classical pottery.
- Philip Johnson, 98, American architect.
- Ron Kersey, 55, American keyboardist, songwriter, producer and arranger.
- Vikki LaMotta, 75, American model, ex-wife of American boxer Jake LaMotta.
- Manuel Lopes, 97, Cape Verdean novelist, poet and essayist.
- Klára Marik, 101, Hungarian writer.
- Ray Peterson, 65, American popular singer ("Tell Laura I Love Her"), cancer.
- Joop Rohner, 77, Dutch water polo goalkeeper and Olympian (1948).
- Max Velthuijs, 81, Dutch writer and illustrator.
- Netti Witziers-Timmer, 81, Dutch sprinter and Olympic champion (1948).

=== 26 ===
- Elias Bowie, 94, American racing driver.
- Fraser Elliott, 83, Canadian lawyer and philanthropist.
- Rudi Falkenhagen, 71, Dutch actor.
- Peter A. Garland, 81, American politician, U.S. Representative from Maine (1961–1963).
- Jackie Henderson, 73, Scottish footballer.
- Josie MacAvin, 85, Irish set director.
- Cordelia Scaife May, 76, American philanthropist and heiress to Mellon family fortune, pancreatic cancer.
- Inge Pohmann, 83/84, German tennis player.

=== 27 ===
- George Coleman, 88, British racewalker and Olympian (1952, 1956).
- Shah A M S Kibria, 73, Bangladeshi economist, diplomat and politician, homicide.
- Rado Lenček, 83, Slovene linguist and ethnologist.
- Aurélie Nemours, 94, French painter.
- Jonathan Welsh, 57, Canadian actor.

=== 28 ===
- Artūras Barysas, 50, Lithuanian counter-culture actor, singer, photographer and filmmaker.
- Daniel Branca, 53, Argentinian Disney comic book artist, heart attack.
- Jim Capaldi, 60, British rock musician and songwriter (Traffic), stomach cancer.
- Lucien Carr, 79, American United Press International editor, bone cancer.
- Christian Christensen, 78, Danish boxer and Olympian (1948).
- Karen Lancaume, (aka Karen Bach), 32, French adult film performer, suicide by drug overdose.
- Paul A. Partain, 58, American actor (The Texas Chain Saw Massacre), cancer.
- Jacques Villeret, 53, French actor and comedian, internal hemorrhage.

=== 29 ===
- Ron Feinberg, 72, American actor (A Boy and His Dog, Hulk Hogan's Rock 'n' Wrestling, The Centurions).
- Eric Griffiths, 64, British guitarist in the musical group The Quarrymen, pancreatic cancer.
- Jean Hengen, 92, Luxembourgish prelate of the Roman Catholic Church.
- Ephraim Kishon, 80, Israeli dramatist, screenwriter and film director, heart attack.
- Žika Mitrović, 83, Serbian film director.
- Bill Shadel, 96, American journalist, prostate cancer.
- Joan Tompkins, 89, American actress.

=== 30 ===
- Mary Beck, 96, American politician.
- Wolfgang Becker, 94, German film director and film editor.
- Martyn Bennett, 33, Scottish Celtic musician, cancer.
- Susan Bradshaw, 73, British pianist.
- Maurice Desimpelaere, 84, Belgian cyclist.
- Sir Horace Law, 93, British admiral.
- Juan Ángel Martini Sr., 89, Argentine Olympic sports shooter (1960, 1964).

=== 31 ===
- Ron Basford, 72, Canadian politician and lawyer.
- Nel Benschop, 87, Dutch poet.
- Jack Collins, 86, American actor (The Towering Inferno, The Sting, Bewitched).
- Makarand Dave, 82, Indian poet and author.
- Malcolm Hardee, 55, British comedian, drowned.
- Ishrat Hashmi, 57, Pakistani actress.
- Bobby Howitt, 79, Scottish football player and manager.
- Hosur Narasimhaiah, 84, Indian physicist and educator.
- Ivan Noble, 37, British BBC journalist, brain cancer.
- Sperry Rademaker, 65, American Olympic canoeist (1968).
- Marcos Sánchez, 81, Chilean Olympic basketball player (1948).
- Franz-Joseph Schulze, 86, German general during and after World War II and Knight's Cross recipient.
- Lee Segel, 72, American mathematician and writer.
- Bill Voiselle, 86, American Major League Baseball player (New York Giants, Boston Braves, Chicago Cubs).
