= Karapatakis =

Karapatakis (feminine form: Karapataki) is a Greek-language surname that may refer to:

- Andreas Karapatakis (born 1964), Cypriot sailor, competitor in the 1988 Summer Olympics (two person dinghy)
- Angeliki Karapataki (born 1975), Greek water polo player, silver medallist in the 2004 Summer Olympics
- Dimitrios Karapatakis (born 1947), Cypriot sailor, competitor in the 1980 Summer Olympics (Flying Dutchman event)
- Marios Karapatakis (born 1951), Cypriot sailor, competitor in the 1980 Summer Olympics (Flying Dutchman event)

All people with the surname "Karapatakis" come from a village in Thessaly, in Central Greece, called Fylaki. In the past decades, the locals migrated to other parts of the country and also to Cyprus, for a better luck and life.

== See also ==
- AEK Arena – Georgios Karapatakis
