= Vollebregt =

Vollebregt is a Dutch surname. Notable people with the surname include:

- Erik Vollebregt (born 1954), Dutch sailor
- Kelly Vollebregt (born 1995), Dutch handball player
- Sjoerd Vollebregt (born 1954), Dutch sailor, twin brother of Erik
