= David Wilkins (sailor) =

Irish Olympic sailor

Medal record

Sailing

Representing Ireland

Olympic Games
Silver medal – second place	1980 Moscow	Flying Dutchman

David Wilkins (born 30 April 1950 in Malahide, County Dublin) is an Irish sailor who competed at five Olympics between 1972 and 1992, winning silver in 1980.

He won a silver medal in sailing for Ireland with partner James Wilkinson at the 1980 Moscow Olympics in the Flying Dutchman class. The sailing events took place at Pirita Yachting Club in Tallinn, Estonia.

He is the first Irish sportsperson to compete at five Olympics.

== See also ==
- Ireland at the 1980 Summer Olympics
- Sailing at the 1980 Summer Olympics
- List of athletes with the most appearances at Olympic Games
