= Harold Johns =

Harold or Harry Johns may refer to:

- Harold E. Johns (1915–1998), Canadian medical physicist
- Harry Johns, Australian rules footballer
- Harold Johns, former vocalist with Black Robot
- Harold Johns (artist), cartoonist, assistant to Frank Hampson on Dan Dare
