= Sailing at the 1976 Summer Olympics – Flying Dutchman =

Sailing at the Olympics

Flying Dutchman at the Games of the XXI Olympiad
- Flying Dutchman
- Venue: Kingston
- Dates: 31 July to 8 August
- Competitors: 40 from 20 nations
- Teams: 20

Medalists
1st place, gold medalist(s)		Jörg Diesch; Eckart Diesch	West Germany
2nd place, silver medalist(s)		Rodney Pattisson; Julian Brooke Houghton	Great Britain
3rd place, bronze medalist(s)		Reinaldo Conrad; Peter Ficker	Brazil

The Flying Dutchman was a sailing event on the Sailing at the 1976 Summer Olympics program in Kingston, Ontario. Seven races were scheduled with 40 sailors, on 20 boats, from 20 nations competing.

== Results ==
Rank	Helmsman (Country)	Crew	Race I		Race II		Race III		Race IV		Race V		Race VI		Race VII		Total Points	Total -1
Rank	Helmsman (Country)	Crew	Rank	Points	Rank	Points	Rank	Points	Rank	Points	Rank	Points	Rank	Points	Rank	Points	Total Points	Total -1
1st place, gold medalist(s)	Jörg Diesch (FRG)	Eckart Diesch	2	3.0	3	5.7	2	3.0	2	3.0	~~16~~	~~22.0~~	5	10.0	5	10.0	56.7	34.7
2nd place, silver medalist(s)	Rodney Pattisson (GBR)	Julian Brooke Houghton	1	0.0	2	3.0	4	8.0	3	5.7	~~18~~	~~24.0~~	12	18.0	11	17.0	75.7	51.7
3rd place, bronze medalist(s)	Reinaldo Conrad (BRA)	Peter Ficker	8	14.0	9	15.0	~~18~~	~~24.0~~	6	11.7	1	0.0	3	5.7	3	5.7	76.1	52.1
4	Hans Fogh (CAN)	Evert Bastet	5	10.0	6	11.7	5	10.0	~~13~~	~~19.0~~	3	5.7	4	8.0	6	11.7	76.1	57.1
5	Vladimir Leontiev (URS)	Valerii Zubanov	3	5.7	~~11~~	~~17.0~~	6	11.7	5	10.0	9	15.0	11	17.0	1	0.0	76.4	59.4
6	Norman Freeman (USA)	John Mathias	6	11.7	~~13~~	~~19.0~~	9	15.0	7	13.0	4	8.0	1	0.0	12	18.0	84.7	65.7
7	Alejandro Abascal (ESP)	José María Benavides	11	17.0	1	0.0	~~RET~~	~~26.0~~	1	0.0	11	17.0	18	24.0	4	8.0	92.0	66.0
8	Yves Pajot (FRA)	Marc Pajot	4	8.0	5	10.0	8	14.0	8	14.0	~~15~~	~~21.0~~	7	13.0	7	13.0	93.0	72.0
9	Mark Bethwaite (AUS)	Timothy Alexander	10	16.0	~~15~~	~~21.0~~	13	19.0	9	15.0	5	10.0	6	11.7	2	3.0	95.7	74.7
10	Stefan Sjöström (SWE)	Reine Andersson	~~13~~	~~19.0~~	4	8.0	12	18.0	4	8.0	8	14.0	8	14.0	8	14.0	95.0	76.0
11	Jörg Hotz (SUI)	André Nicolet	9	15.0	7	13.0	~~11~~	~~17.0~~	10	16.0	10	16.0	2	3.0	10	16.0	96.0	79.0
12	Jock Bilger (NZL)	Murray Ross	7	13.0	8	14.0	1	0.0	15	21.0	12	18.0	13	19.0	~~17~~	~~23.0~~	108.0	85.0
13	Ernst Seidl (AUT)	Johann Eisl	15	21.0	10	16.0	7	13.0	12	18.0	2	3.0	~~16~~	~~22.0~~	15	21.0	114.0	92.0
14	Erik Vollebregt (NED)	Sjoerd Vollebregt	~~DSQ~~	~~28.0~~	14	20.0	3	5.7	DSQ	28.0	7	13.0	10	16.0	9	15.0	125.7	97.7
15	Uwe Steingross (GDR)	Jörg Schramme	16	22.0	~~17~~	~~23.0~~	15	21.0	14	20.0	6	11.7	9	15.0	14	20.0	132.7	109.7
16	Carlo Croce (ITA)	Luciano Zinali	~~17~~	~~23.0~~	12	18.0	14	20.0	11	17.0	14	20.0	14	20.0	13	19.0	137.0	114.0
17	Yoel Sela (ISR)	Yehuda Maayan	12	18.0	16	22.0	17	23.0	~~DSQ~~	~~28.0~~	13	19.0	15	21.0	16	22.0	153.0	125.0
18	Takumi Horiuchi (JPN)	Kazuo Hanaoka	14	20.0	18	24.0	10	16.0	17	23.0	~~19~~	~~25.0~~	19	25.0	18	24.0	157.0	132.0
19	Barry O'Neill (IRL)	James Wilkinson	19	25.0	19	25.0	16	22.0	16	22.0	~~RET~~	~~26.0~~	17	23.0	19	25.0	168.0	142.0
20	Javier Prieto (MEX)	Javier Ruiz	18	24.0	~~DNF~~	~~26.0~~	19	25.0	18	24.0	17	23.0	20	26.0	RET	26.0	174.0	148.0

DNF = Did Not Finish, DNS= Did Not Start, DSQ = Disqualified, PMS = Premature Start, YMP = Yacht Materially Prejudiced
= Male, = Female

=== Daily standings ===
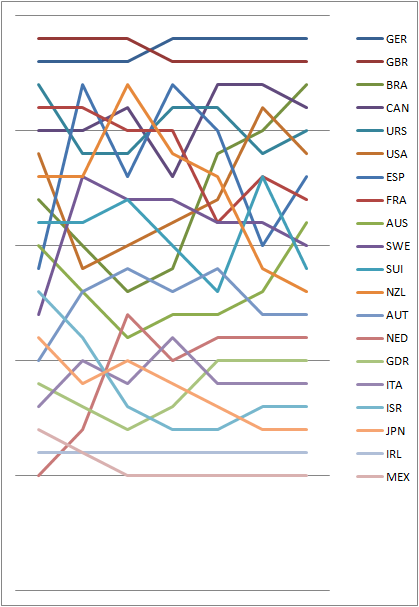
Graph showing the daily standings in the Flying Dutchman during the 1976 Summer Olympics
