= Javier Ruiz =

Javier Ruiz may refer to:

- Javier Ruiz (sailor) (born 1950), Mexican sailor
- Javier Ruiz (news anchor) (born 1973), Spanish business journalist
- Javier Ruiz (footballer) (born 2004), Argentine football midfielder
- Javier Ruiz Caldera (born 1976), Spanish film director
- Javier Ruiz de Larrinaga (born 1979), Spanish racing cyclist
- Javier Ruiz Rueda (1909-1993), Mexican composer and writer

== See also ==
- Javi Ruiz (born 1980), Spanish football goalkeeper
