= Wolfgang Wenzel =

Wolfgang Wenzel may refer to:

- Wolfgang Wenzel (canoeist)
- Wolfgang Wenzel (sailor)
