= Jana Kubičková-Posnerová =

Slovak artistic gymnast

Jana Kubičková
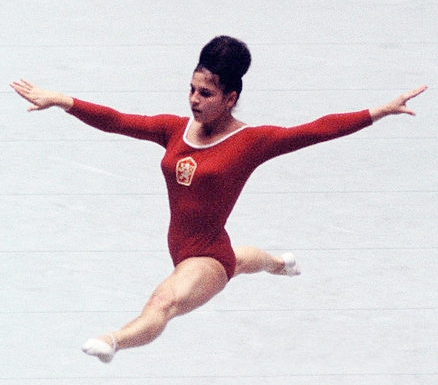
- Kubičková at the 1964 Olympics

Personal information
- Full name: Jana Posnerová
- Born: 9 January 1945 (age 81) Ašakert, Nitra Region, Slovak Republic (modern Nové Sady, Slovakia)
- Height: 1.64 m (5 ft 5 in)

Gymnastics career
- Discipline: Women's artistic gymnastics
Medal record
Representing Czechoslovakia
Olympic Games
Silver medal – second place	1964 Tokyo	Team
Silver medal – second place	1968 Mexico City	Team
World Championships
Gold medal – first place	1966 Dortmund	Team

Jana Kubičková-Posnerová (born 9 January 1945) is a Slovak former gymnast. She won a silver medal at the 1964 Summer Olympics in Tokyo and a silver medal at 1968 Summer Olympics in Mexico City both in team all-around.

Individually, her best achievement was eighth place in the floor exercise in 1968.

She married Václav Kubička, an Olympic gymnast who also competed at the 1964 and 1968 Olympics.
