= Sailing at the 1980 Summer Olympics – Flying Dutchman =

Sailing at the Olympics

Flying Dutchman at the Games of the XXII Olympiad
- Flying Dutchman
- Venue: Tallinn
- Dates: 21 to 29 July
- Competitors: 30 from 15 nations
- Teams: 15

Medalists
1st place, gold medalist(s)		Alejandro Abascal; Miguel Noguer	Spain
2nd place, silver medalist(s)		David Wilkins; James Wilkinson	Ireland
3rd place, bronze medalist(s)		Szabolcs Detre; Zsolt Detre	Hungary

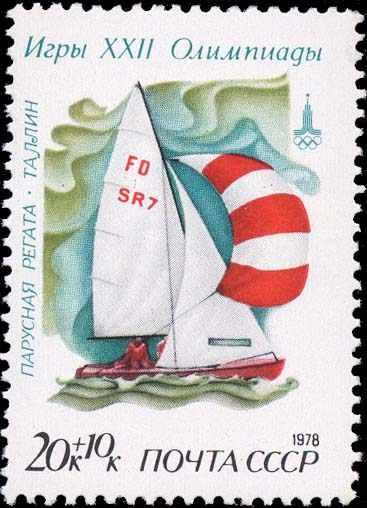
The FD on a Soviet stamp issued for the Olympics

The Flying Dutchman was a sailing event on the Sailing at the 1980 Summer Olympics program in Tallinn. Seven races were scheduled. 30 sailors, on 15 boats, from 15 nations competed.

== Results ==
Rank	Helmsman (Country)	Crew	Race I		Race II		Race III		Race IV		Race V		Race VI		Race VII		Total Points	Total -1
Rank	Helmsman (Country)	Crew	Rank	Points	Rank	Points	Rank	Points	Rank	Points	Rank	Points	Rank	Points	Rank	Points	Total Points	Total -1
1st place, gold medalist(s)	Alejandro Abascal (ESP)	Miguel Noguer	4	8.0	1	0.0	2	3.0	4	8.0	1	0.0	1	0.0	~~DNS~~	~~22.0~~	41.0	19.0
2nd place, silver medalist(s)	David Wilkins (IRL)	James Wilkinson	2	3.0	~~11~~	~~17.0~~	4	8.0	5	10.0	2	3.0	2	3.0	2	3.0	47.0	30.0
3rd place, bronze medalist(s)	Szabolcs Detre (HUN)	Zsolt Detre	1	0.0	9	15.0	5	10.0	3	5.7	~~11~~	~~17.0~~	9	15.0	1	0.0	62.7	45.7
4	Wolfgang Haase (GDR)	Wolfgang Wenzel	5	10.0	4	8.0	3	5.7	~~9~~	~~15.0~~	4	8.0	3	5.7	8	14.0	66.4	51.4
5	Vladimir Leontiev (URS)	Valeri Zubanov	6	11.7	7	13.0	1	0.0	1	0.0	8	14.0	7	13.0	~~9~~	~~15.0~~	66.7	51.7
6	Jørgen Bojsen-Møller (DEN)	Jacob Bojsen-Møller	~~DSQ~~	~~22.0~~	3	5.7	6	11.7	6	11.7	6	11.7	4	8.0	3	5.7	76.5	54.5
7	Erik Vollebregt (NED)	Sjoerd Vollebregt	~~8~~	~~14.0~~	2	3.0	8	14.0	8	14.0	3	5.7	5	10.0	4	8.0	68.7	54.7
8	Reinaldo Conrad (BRA)	Manfred Kaufmann	3	5.7	5	10.0	~~9~~	~~15.0~~	7	13.0	5	10.0	6	11.7	7	13.0	78.4	63.4
9	Danko Mandić (YUG)	Zoran Kalebić	9	15.0	8	14.0	~~11~~	~~17.0~~	2	3.0	10	16.0	10	16.0	5	10.0	91.0	74.0
10	Marco Savelli (ITA)	Roberto Gazzei	7	13.0	6	11.7	10	16.0	~~RET~~	~~22.0~~	7	13.0	8	14.0	6	11.7	101.4	79.4
11	Andrzej Iwinski (POL)	Ludwik Raczynski	11	17.0	~~DSQ~~	~~22.0~~	7	13.0	10	16.0	9	15.0	11	17.0	12	18.0	118.0	96.0
12	Václav Brandejs (TCH)	Ivan Brandejs	10	16.0	10	16.0	~~12~~	~~18.0~~	12	18.0	12	18.0	12	18.0	11	17.0	121.0	103.0
13	Mircea Carp (ROM)	Adrian Arendt	12	18.0	12	18.0	13	19.0	11	17.0	13	19.0	~~14~~	~~20.0~~	13	19.0	130.0	110.0
14	Mitko Kabakov (BUL)	Dimitar Georgiev	13	19.0	13	19.0	~~14~~	~~20.0~~	13	19.0	14	20.0	13	19.0	10	16.0	132.0	112.0
15	Marios Karapatakis (CYP)	Dimitrios Karapatakis	14	20.0	~~RET~~	~~22.0~~	15	21.0	14	20.0	15	21.0	15	21.0	14	20.0	145.0	123.0

DNF = Did Not Finish, DNS= Did Not Start, DSQ = Disqualified, PMS = Premature Start, YMP = Yacht Materially Prejudiced
= Male, = Female

=== Daily standings ===
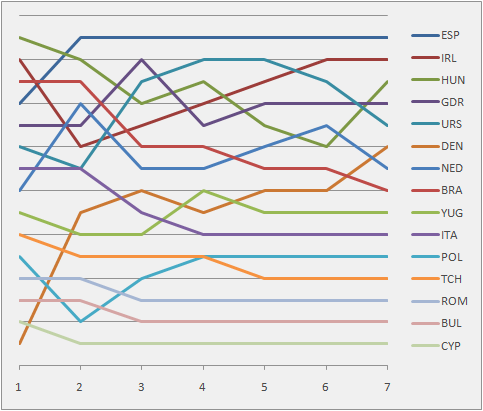
Graph showing the daily standings in the Flying Dutchman during the 1980 Summer Olympics
