= Javier Prieto =

Javier Prieto may refer to:

- Javier Prieto (boxer) (born 1987), Mexican boxer
- Javier Prieto (sailor) (born 1949), Mexican sailor
