= Simon Korver =

Dutch sailor (1940–2009)

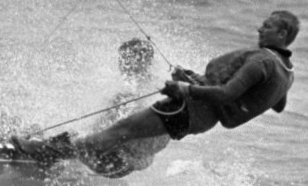

Personal information
- Full name: Simon Willem Korver
- Nationality: Dutch
- Born: 11 June 1940 Amsterdam
- Died: 19 October 2009 (aged 69)
- Height: 1.83 m (6.0 ft)

Sailing career
- Sport: Sailing
- Club: Watersport Vereniging; De Koenen
- Coached by: Jacques Stap 1968 & 1972
- Class: Flying Dutchman
Medal record
Sailing
Representing Netherlands
European Championship
Bronze medal – third place	1972 Medemblik	Flying Dutchman
- Updated on 28 December 2013

Simon Willem Korver (11 June 1940 – 19 October 2009) was a sailor from the Netherlands who represented his native country at the 1972 Summer Olympics in Kiel, Germany. With helmsmen Fred Imhoff Korver took the 10th place in the Flying Dutchman. After the Munich massacre during the 1972 Summer Olympics Korver was in doubt if and how to continue. Jacques Stap, the course area coach, finally made him continue to finish the series. Korver was the substitute for the Flying Dutchman during the 1968 Olympics. He was born in Amsterdam.

== Sources ==
- "Simon Korver Bio, Stats, and Results". Olympic Sports. Sports-Reference.com. Archived from the original on 2020-04-18.
- "De Nederlandse afvaardiging" (in Dutch). Limburgsch dagblad. 1968-10-11.
- "OS-zeilers" (in Dutch). Het vrĳe volk : democratisch-socialistisch dagblad. 1972-06-22.
- "GOED WERK VAN ZEILERS IN KIEL" (in Dutch). Leeuwarder courant : hoofdblad van Friesland. 1972-08-31.
- "Topzeilers vallen tegen" (in Dutch). De tĳd : dagblad voor Nederland. 1972-09-13.
- "zeilen paul knoop IDEALEN" (in Dutch). De Telegraaf. 1972-09-07.
- "The official report of the Organizing Committee for the Games of the XXth Olympiad Munich 1972, Volume 1 The organization" (PDF). Munich: proSport. 1974.
- "The official report of the Organizing Committee for the Games of the XXth Olympiad Munich 1972, Volume 2 The constructions" (PDF). Munich: proSport. 1974. Archived from the original (PDF) on February 2, 2014.
- "The official report of the Organizing Committee for the Games of the XXth Olympiad Munich 1972, Volume 3 The competitions" (PDF). Munich: proSport. 1974.
