= Fred Imhoff =

Dutch sailor (born 1942)

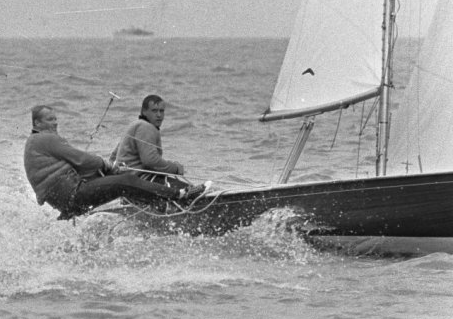
- Fred Imhoff (Helm) & Simon Korver in 1967. In 1972 this duo represented the Netherlands during the Olympic Games in the Flying Dutchman.

Personal information
- Full name: Ferdinand Helmuth Imhoff
- Nationality: Dutch
- Born: 15 February 1942 (age 84) The Hague
- Height: 1.83 m (6.0 ft)

Sailing career
- Sport: Sailing
- Classes: Pluis, 2.4 Metre, Vrijheid, Flying Dutchman, Yngling, Soling, Dragon
Medal record
Sailing
Representing Netherlands
World Championship
Silver medal – second place	1999 Fort-de-France	Dragon
European Championship
Gold medal – first place	1998 Medemblik	Dragon
Gold medal – first place	2003 Kinsale	Dragon
Bronze medal – third place	1972 Medemblik	Flying Dutchman
Dragon Gold Cup
Gold medal – first place	1988 Le Havre	Dragon
Gold medal – first place	1989 Travemünde	Dragon
Gold medal – first place	1993 Medemblik	Dragon
Silver medal – second place	2002 Mariehamn	Dragon
- Updated on 21 December 2013

Ferdinand "Fred" Helmuth Imhoff (born 15 February 1942 in The Hague) is a sailor from the Netherlands, who represented his country at the 1972 Summer Olympics in Kiel, Germany as helmsman in the Flying Dutchman Brave Henderik IV (H-230). With crew Simon Korver they took the 10th place. Imhoff was the substitute for the Dragon during the 1968 Olympics.

During the 1970s Imhoff led the Dutch Yellow Joker Sailing Team, a group of sailors who sailed many Dutch National Classes, like the Solo as well as Flying Dutchman and Yngling. Later Imhoff specialized in keelboat classes in general and belonged to the world top in the Dragon between 1986 and 2006. Imhoff nowadays sails the 2.4 Metre.

== Controversy ==
During the selection for the Dutch Olympic Sailing Team for the 1976 Olympics a controversy emerged between twelve sailors and the selection committee chaired by André du Pon. This discussion focussed on the role of Frieda Vollebergt who did the communication for the sailing team. As mother of Erik Vollebregt, Sjoerd Vollebregt and Peter Vollebregt – All three candidates for the 1976 Olympic sailing event – she was accused for having a bias towards het children in the communication. In the end Fred Imhoff and Heike Blok lost the lawsuit and were removed from the 1976 selection.

== Professional life ==
Imhoff owned a specialized enterprise in sailing equipment, and was one of the first overseas dealers for Harken fittings. Also Imhoff developed the brand 'Imhoff' for sailing clothes. Furthermore, he developed during the 1970s and 1980s: Spars (Imhoff) and Sails (Gaastra Imhoff Goldlabel Sails).

== Books ==
Fred Imhoff published (some of them in cooperation with Lex Pranger) several books on sailing that were translated in many languages. Some of the Dutch titles are:

- Dit is snel zeilen (1975) ISBN 9022811239
- Dit is getrained zeilen (1978) ISBN 9022811662
- Winnen is geen geluk (2014) ISBN 9064105936
Leading in the Dragon
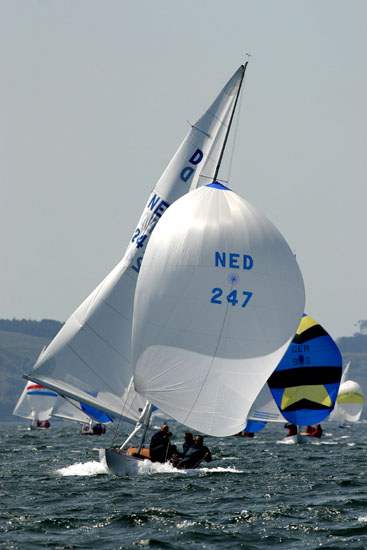
Fred Imhoff, Richard van Rij & Rudy den Outer
sailing the Dragon: "Danish Joker" (NED 247).

== Sources ==
- Evans, Hilary; Gjerde, Arild; Heijmans, Jeroen; Mallon, Bill; et al. "Fred Imhoff". Olympics at Sports-Reference.com. Sports Reference LLC. Archived from the original on 24 December 2013.
- "De Nederlandse afvaardiging" (in Dutch). Limburgsch dagblad. 11 October 1968.
- "De Nederlandse afvaardiging" (in Dutch). Limburgsch dagblad. 11 October 1968.
- "Zeilers hebben geen tijd om uit te huilen" (in Dutch). De tĳd : dagblad voor Nederland. 9 November 1968.
- "The Games of the XIX Olympiad Mexico 1968, The Official Report of the Organizing Committee Volume One Part One" (PDF). 1968. Archived from the original (pdf) on 18 November 2008 – via la84foundation.org.
- "The Games of the XIX Olympiad Mexico 1968, The Official Report of the Organizing Committee Volume One Part Two" (PDF). 1968. Archived from the original (pdf) on 18 November 2008 – via la84foundation.org.
- "The Games of the XIX Olympiad Mexico 1968, The Official Report of the Organizing Committee Volume Two Part One" (PDF). 1968. Archived from the original (pdf) on 18 November 2008 – via la84foundation.org.
- "The Games of the XIX Olympiad Mexico 1968, The Official Report of the Organizing Committee Volume Two Part Two" (PDF). 1968. Archived from the original (pdf) on 18 November 2008 – via la84foundation.org.
- "The Games of the XIX Olympiad Mexico 1968, The Official Report of the Organizing Committee Volume Three Part One" (PDF). 1968. Archived from the original (pdf) on 26 February 2008 – via la84foundation.org.
- "The Games of the XIX Olympiad Mexico 1968, The Official Report of the Organizing Committee Volume Three Part Two" (PDF). 1968. Archived from the original (pdf) on 18 November 2008 – via la84foundation.org.
- "The Games of the XIX Olympiad Mexico 1968, The Official Report of the Organizing Committee Volume Four Part One" (PDF). 1968. Archived from the original (pdf) on 18 November 2008 – via la84foundation.org.
- "The Games of the XIX Olympiad Mexico 1968, The Official Report of the Organizing Committee Volume Four Part Two" (PDF). 1968. Archived from the original (pdf) on 18 November 2008 – via la84foundation.org.
- "OS-zeilers" (in Dutch). Het vrĳe volk : democratisch-socialistisch dagblad. 22 June 1972.
- "GOED WERK VAN ZEILERS IN KIEL" (in Dutch). Leeuwarder courant : hoofdblad van Friesland. 31 August 1972.
- "Topzeilers vallen tegen" (in Dutch). De tĳd : dagblad voor Nederland. 13 September 1972.
- "The official report of the Organizing Committee for the Games of the XXth Olympiad Munich 1972, Volume 1 The organization" (PDF). Munich: proSport. 1974. Archived from the original (PDF) on 8 August 2012 – via la84foundation.org.
- "The official report of the Organizing Committee for the Games of the XXth Olympiad Munich 1972, Volume 2 The constructions" (PDF). Munich: proSport. 1974. Archived from the original (PDF) on 2 February 2014 – via la84.org.
- "The official report of the Organizing Committee for the Games of the XXth Olympiad Munich 1972, Volume 3 The competitions" (PDF). Munich: proSport. 1974. Archived from the original (PDF) on 27 September 2007 – via la84foundation.org.
- "Verwijt" (in Dutch). De Telegraaf. 22 August 1975.
- "Zeiltop zit in het nauw" (in Dutch). De Telegraaf. 9 October 1975.
- "Fred Imhoff in kort geding tegen KNWV" (in Dutch). Leeuwarder courant : hoofdblad van Friesland. 9 October 1975.
- "Uitslag proces: Fred Imhoff niet terug in kernploeg" (in Dutch). De Telegraaf. 9 April 1976.
- "Imhoff en Blok uit Olympische zeilploeg gezet" (in Dutch). Leeuwarder courant : hoofdblad van Friesland. 2 April 1976.
- "Imhoff" (in Dutch). Het vrĳe volk : democratisch-socialistisch dagblad. 9 April 1976.
- "Imhoff heeft nog kleine kans" (in Dutch). De Telegraaf. 16 April 1976.
- "Mevrouw Vollebregt centraal in zeilrel" (in Dutch). De Telegraaf. 23 April 1976.
- "Du Pon ziet nieuwe mogelijkheden TOPZEILERS WEER IN KERNPLOEG" (in Dutch). De Telegraaf. 1 December 1976.
- "Technical Sail Wear Collection". ondeck.nl. Weteringbrug, Netherlands. 2014.
