= Carlo Croce (sailor) =

Italian sailor

Carlo Croce (born 9 September 1945) is an Italian former yacht racer who competed in the 1972 Summer Olympics and the 1976 Summer Olympics. He was born in Genoa, Italy.

In 2012 he was elected as president of the International Sailing Federation (ISAF).

== Olympic events ==
1972 Summer Olympics in Munich, competing with Luciano Zinali for Italy:

- Flying Dutchman – 11th place of 29 teams

1976 Summer Olympics in Montreal, competing with Luciano Zinali for Italy:

- Flying Dutchman – 16th place of 20 teams
