= Erik Vollebregt =

Dutch sailor

Personal information
- Full name: Jan Erik Vollebregt
- Nationality: Dutch
- Born: 10 December 1954 (age 71) Leiden
- Height: 1.85 m (6.1 ft)

Sailing career
- Sport: Sailing
- Club: Koninklijke Watersport Vereniging; De Kaag
- Classes: 470; Flying Dutchman
Competition record
Representing Netherlands
Olympic Games
Gold medal – first place	1976 Kingston	Flying Dutchman
Gold medal – first place	1980 Tallinn	Flying Dutchman
World Championships
Gold medal – first place	1972 Montreal	470
Bronze medal – third place	1977 Torbole	Flying Dutchman
Bronze medal – third place	1979 Kiel	Flying Dutchman
- Updated on 13 February 2014

Jan Erik Vollebregt (born 10 December 1954, in Leiden) is a sailor from the Netherlands who represented his native country at the 1976 Summer Olympics in Kingston, Ontario. With twin brother Sjoerd Vollebregt as crew, Vollebregt finished 14th in the Sailing at the 1976 Summer Olympics – Flying Dutchman. Since in 1980 the Netherlands boycotted the Moscow Olympics, Vollebregt represented his National Olympic Committee under the Dutch NOC flag in the Flying Dutchman. Again with his brother as crew, he took 7th place.

After the 1980 Olympics Vollebregt started a new Olympic Flying Dutchman campaign for the 1984 Olympics with Eddy Huisman but finally failed to qualify.

== Controversions ==
- 1976:

During the selection for the Dutch Olympic Sailing Team for the 1976 Olympics a controversy emerged between twelve sailors and the selection committee chaired by André du Pon. Fred Imhoff and Heike Blok, two sailors hoping to be selected, filed suit, arguing that Frieda Vollebergt, the communications person for the sailing team, was partial: as mother of Erik, Sjoerd, and Peter Vollebregt, all candidates for the 1976 Olympic sailing event, she was accused of having a bias towards her children. In the end Imhoff and Blok lost the lawsuit and were removed from the 1976 selection. During this period Vollebregt's father, Jan Vollebregt, was president of the Koninklijk Nederlands Watersport Verbond (Dutch Yacht Racing Union).

- 1980:

Several countries did boycott the 1980 Summer Olympics, others like France did not go since they found the competition devaluated. As result only half of the expected fleet was present during the Olympic regattas.
