= Mitko Kabakov =

Bulgarian sailor

Personal information
- Nationality: Bulgarian
- Born: 22 October 1955 (age 69)

Sport
- Sport: Sailing

Mitko Kabakov (Bulgarian: Митко Кабаков; born 22 October 1955) is a Bulgarian sailor. He competed in the Flying Dutchman event at the 1980 Summer Olympics, finishing 14th alongside his partner Dimitar Georgiev
