= Takumi Horiuchi =

Japanese sailor

Personal information
- Nationality: Japanese
- Born: 7 January 1949 (age 76)

Sport
- Sport: Sailing

Takumi Horiuchi (born 7 January 1949) is a Japanese sailor. He competed in the Flying Dutchman event at the 1976 Summer Olympics.
