= Zoran Kalebić =

Croatian sailor

Personal information
- Nationality: Croatian
- Born: 4 October 1957 (age 69) Rijeka, Yugoslavia

Sport
- Sport: Sailing

Zoran Kalebić (born 4 October 1957) is a Croatian sailor. He competed in the Flying Dutchman event at the 1980 Summer Olympics.
