= Adrian Arendt =

Romanian sailor

Personal information
- Nationality: Romanian
- Born: 20 August 1952 (age 72)
- Height: 197 cm (6 ft 6 in)
- Weight: 92 kg (203 lb)

Sport
- Sport: Sailing

Adrian Arendt (born 20 August 1952) is a Romanian sailor. He competed in the Flying Dutchman event at the 1980 Summer Olympics.
