= Danko Mandić =

Croatian sailor

Personal information
- Nationality: Croatian
- Born: 16 July 1957 (age 69) Rijeka, Yugoslavia

Sport
- Sport: Sailing

Danko Mandić (born 16 July 1957) is a Croatian sailor. He competed in the Flying Dutchman event at the 1980 Summer Olympics.
