= Mircea Carp =

Romanian sailor

Personal information
- Nationality: Romanian
- Born: 9 November 1952 (age 72)

Sport
- Sport: Sailing

Mircea Carp (born 9 November 1952) is a Romanian sailor. He competed in the Flying Dutchman event at the 1980 Summer Olympics.
