= Luciano Zinali =

Italian sailor

Luciano Zinali (born 13 August 1943) is an Italian former yacht racer who competed in the 1972 Summer Olympics and the 1976 Summer Olympics. He was born in Piombino, Italy.

== Olympic events ==
1972 Summer Olympics in Munich, competing with Carlo Croce for Italy:

- Flying Dutchman – 11th place of 29 teams

1976 Summer Olympics in Montreal, competing with Carlo Croce for Italy:

- Flying Dutchman – 16th place of 20 teams
