= Stefan Sjöström =

Swedish sailor

Personal information
- Nationality: Swedish
- Born: 30 November 1945 (age 79); Gothenburg, Sweden

Sport
- Sport: Sailing

Stefan Sjöström (born 30 November 1945) is a Swedish sailor. He competed in the Flying Dutchman event at the 1976 Summer Olympics.
