= Tarnovia Tarnów =

Polish football club

- Full name: Miejski Klub Sportowy Tarnovia
- Nickname: Tovia
- Founded: 1909; 117 years ago
- Ground: MKS Tarnovia Stadium
- Capacity: 300
- Chairman: Zbigniew Kupiec
- Manager: Janusz Kuboń
- League: V liga Lesser Poland East
- 2023–24: V liga Lesser Poland East, 10th of 16
- Website: https://mkstarnovia.pl
Home colours	Away colours

Tarnovia Tarnów is a Polish sports club, founded in 1909 in the southern city of Tarnów. With white and red hues, the club's founders wanted to emphasize their patriotism, during the time when their homeland was divided into three powers (see: Partitions of Poland). Tarnovia was based on two smaller teams, which had been created by students of local high schools in 1906 and 1908. These organizations, called Bialo-Czerwoni and Pogon, merged in 1909, creating Tarnovia. In the interbellum period its soccer team played in Kraków's A-Class (see: Lower Level Football Leagues in Interwar Poland).

In 1948 men's football Tarnovia was promoted to Polish First Division, but remained there only for one year and was relegated. Tarnovia's most famous player is Antoni Barwiński, who was capped 16 times for the Poland national team. Currently, Tarnovia's soccer team plays in the local league of Tarnów. Among most notable players who began their careers at Tarnovia are Mateusz Klich and Bartosz Kapustka.

Apart from soccer Tarnovia also supports other departments – women's football, women's volleyball, climbing and table tennis.

== History ==
=== Men's football ===
The history of Tarnovia dates back to 1909, when a group of young sports enthusiasts from Tarnów decided to merge two already existing football teams (Bialo-Czerwoni and Pogon), forming Football Club Tarnovia-Czarni (in some sources, the name was presented as Tarnovia-Pogon). Before World War I, Tarnovia played several games against other Polish teams of Austrian Galicia, including Cracovia, Resovia, Czarni Jasło.

In 1913, Tarnovia-Pogon played in Galician A-Class, but the outbreak of the war halted the development of the team. In 1914–1918, all activities of Tarnovia were suspended. The team returned in the spring of 1919, when it tied 1–1 with Cracovia.

In 1919–1922, Tarnovia played as many as 150 friendly games, and was the best team of the region of Tarnów. In 1920, the team received a new stadium near Tarnów Rail Station, on the land that was owned by Prince Sanguszko. First game took place there in the autumn of 1921: Tarnovia defeated 11–0 the team of the 16th Infantry Regiment. In 1922, a wooden stand was built, and the complex was fenced. Soon afterwards, locker rooms were added underneath the stand, also three tennis courts were built.

In 1922, Tarnovia was added to B Class of Tarnów – Jasło. In its first year, it won 11 games (out of 12), with goal difference 28–6. In the playoffs to Class A, Tarnovia lost 1–2 to the reserves of Cracovia, and 0–5 to Jewish side Hakoah Bielsko. In 1923, Tarnovia again won B Class, to lose the playoffs to Olsza Kraków and Hakoah Bielsko. In 1924, Tarnovia continued playing in B Class, against such teams as Resovia, Wisłoka Dębica, and a number of sides from Kraków (Sparta, Jutrzenka, Podgorze, Zwierzyniecki, AZS). Also in 1924, a Czech team from Hradec Kralowe came to Tarnów, to win 1–0 in a friendly feature. Furthermore, in the early 1920, several other foreign teams visited Tarnów, mostly from Hungary.

In 1925, Tarnovia again won the B Class, with only one lost game, vs Resovia in Rzeszów. In 1926, the team, temporarily managed by Józef Kałuża, finally won promotion to Class A, which was second level of Polish football system at that time. To achieve this, Tarnovia emerged as the leader of a playoff group, which also included Zwierzyniecki Kraków, Biala Lipnik and Victoria Sosnowiec.

In 1927, Tarnovia finished in the second spot of Kraków A Class, only behind Cracovia. In 1928, the team detached itself from Sokol Association, as independent Sports Club Tarnovia. In the same year, Tarnovia's best players left the team: Jozef Smoczek and Wladyslaw Jachimek were transferred to Garbarnia Kraków. As a result, in the 1928 season, Tarnovia won 6 games, with 3 ties and as many as 16 losses. In 1929, Tarnovia won 13 games.

The young generation of players was unable to keep the team in A Class, and in 1932, Tarnovia was relegated, to return there after one year. In 1934, Tarnovia finished second, only behind Grzegorzecki Kraków, but in 1935, it was again relegated to B Class. In 1937, Tarnovia won promotion to Kraków Regional League, as this was the new name of Kraków A Class. In the unfinished 1939 season of Kraków Regional League, Tarnovia was in the 5th spot (after 20 games). In autumn 1938, Tarnovia played a friendly home game vs. BAC Vienna, winning 5–0. In return, Tarnovia was invited to play in Vienna in autumn 1939, but this game never took place.

During World War II, Tarnovia's footballers played conspirational games in the outskirts of the city. Several athletes were killed.

In early 1945, Tarnovia returned, due to the efforts of prewar activists. First friendly game took place on February 4, 1945. The 1940s team was based mostly on the players who in 1939 represented Tarnovia's U-19 side. In the autumn of 1947, Tarnovia achieved its greatest success to this day: promotion to the Ekstraklasa. First, Tarnovia won regional games, and then, in the play-offs of southeastern Poland, it defeated Partyzant Kielce, Legia Krosno, and JKS Jarosław. Finally, in the national playoffs, Tarnovia finished behind Ruch Chorzów and Legia Warszawa, but ahead of Widzew Łódź and Lechia Gdańsk.

In the 1948 Ekstraklasa, Tarnovia, with its top player Antoni Barwiński (who in 1947–1950 capped 17 times for Poland), had 22 points, and finished in the 11th position, out of 14 teams. Together with Garbarnia Kraków, Widzew Łódź and Rymer Radlin, it was relegated back to the second level. Nevertheless, Tarnovia managed to achieve several notable victories during its lone season in the Ekstraklasa, beating, among others, Legia Warsaw (2–0 in Warsaw), Wisła Kraków 2–1, Ruch Chorzów 3–0, Warta Poznań 3–1 and AKS Chorzów 4–0. Among notable supporters of Tarnovia was Jerzy Putrament. In that season, Tarnovia was managed by Artur Walter and Wladyslaw Lemieszko (formerly of Pogoń Lwów).

After the relegation, Tarnovia played in the Second Division. In 1949, it finished in the second position, behind Rymer Radlin. In 1955, Tarnovia was relegated to the third level, and in 1956, to regional league, or A-Class. In the 1960s and 70s, Tarnovia played either in the third or fourth level of Polish football system. In July 1979, three sports clubs from Tarnów (Tarnovia, Metal and Tamel) merged as MZKS Tarnovia. The new team finished second in the regional league, behind Igloopol Dębica.

In the 1980s, Tarnovia played mostly in the third division, group VIII, which covered southeastern corner of Poland.

=== Naming history ===
- 1909 – Tarnovia-Czarni, Tarnovia-Pogoń
- 1918 – Sokoli Klub Sportowy Tarnovia
- 1945 – Towarzystwo Sportowe Tarnovia
- 1950 – Związkowy Klub Sportowy Ogniwo-Tarnovia
- 1954 – Tarnowski Klub Sportowy Sparta-Tarnovia
- 1957 – Klub Sportowy Start-Tarnovia
- 1979 – Międzyzakładowy Klub Sportowy Tarnovia
- 1981 – Miejski Klub Sportowy Tarnovia

== Honours ==
=== Men's football ===
- 11th place in Ekstraklasa: 1948
- Round of 16 of the Polish Cup: 1954–55

=== Women's football ===
- Women's Polish Cup quarter-finalists: 2018–19

== Sources ==
- History of Tarnovia's football department
