= Barry O'Neill (sailor) =

Irish sailor

Personal information
- Nationality: Irish
- Born: 1 January 1946 (age 79)

Sport
- Sport: Sailing

Barry O'Neill (born 1 January 1946) is an Irish sailor. He competed in the Flying Dutchman event at the 1976 Summer Olympics.
