= André du Pon =

Dutch sailor

Personal information
- Full name: André du Pon
- Nationality: Dutch
- Born: 30 August 1924 Amsterdam
- Died: 24 May 2006 (aged 81) Medemblik

Sailing career
- Sport: Sailing
- Updated on 2014-01-30

Chef d' équipe
- Highest governing body: KNWV

Characteristics
- Team members: Dutch Olympic Sailing Team
- Type: Sailing
- Venue: Olympic Games; 1976, Kingston; 1984, Long Beach; 1988, Pusan

André du Pon (30 August 1924, in Amsterdam – 24 May 2006, in Medemblik) was a Dutch sailor who was three times chef d'équipe for the Dutch Olympic Sailing team. Du Pon led his teams during the 1976 Olympics in Kingston, Ontario, the 1984 Olympics in Long Beach and the 1988 Olympics in Pusan.

After sailing the Finn Du Pon was also one of the first Soling sailors of the Netherlands. He owned the Soling H 4.

== Controversy ==
During the selection for the Dutch Olympic Sailing Team for the 1976 Olympics a controversy emerged between twelve sailors and the selection committee chaired by Du Pon. This discussion focussed on the role of Frieda Vollebergt who did the communication for the sailing team. As mother of Erik Vollebregt, Sjoerd Vollebregt and Peter Vollebregt – all three candidates for the 1976 Olympic sailing event – she was accused of having a bias towards her children in the communication. In the end Fred Imhoff and Heike Blok lost the lawsuit and were removed from the 1976 selection.

== Political career ==
Du Pon was in the period 1990 – 1998 and from 2002 – 2006 alderman for the liberal party VVD in Medemblik. During those periods he held several times the position of deputy mayor.

== Sources ==
- "André du Pon passed away" (in Dutch). Westfriesland: nieuws 25-05-2006.
- "Verwijt" (in Dutch). De Telegraaf. 1975-08-22.
- "Zeiltop zit in het nauw" (in Dutch). De Telegraaf. 1975-10-09.
- "Fred Imhoff in kort geding tegen KNWV" (in Dutch). Leeuwarder courant : hoofdblad van Friesland. 1975-10-09.
- "Uitslag proces: Fred Imhoff niet terug in kernploeg" (in Dutch). De Telegraaf. 1976-04-09.
- "Imhoff en Blok uit Olympische zeilploeg gezet" (in Dutch). Leeuwarder courant : hoofdblad van Friesland. 1976-04-02.
- "Imhoff" (in Dutch). Het vrĳe volk : democratisch-socialistisch dagblad. 1976-04-09.
- "Imhoff heeft nog kleine kans" (in Dutch). De Telegraaf. 1976-04-16.
- "Mevrouw Vollebregt centraal in zeilrel" (in Dutch). De Telegraaf. 1976-04-23.
- "Du Pon ziet nieuwe mogelijkheden TOPZEILERS WEER IN KERNPLOEG" (in Dutch). De Telegraaf. 1976-12-01.
- "Nederlandse delegatie" (in Dutch). Leeuwarder courant : hoofdblad van Friesland. 1976-07-12.
- "Olympische zeilselectie" (in Dutch). De Telegraaf. 1976-05-20.
- "Gouden dag zeilers" (in Dutch). De Telegraaf. 1976-05-25.
- "Montréal 1976 Official Report, Volume I: Organization" (PDF). Ottawa: COJO. 1978. Archived from the original (PDF) on February 2, 2014.
- "Montréal 1976 Official Report, Volume II: Facilities" (PDF). Ottawa: COJO. 1978. Archived from the original (PDF) on February 2, 2014.
- "Montréal 1976 Official Report, Volume III: Results" (PDF). Ottawa: COJO. 1978. Archived from the original (PDF) on January 1, 2014.
- "Oranje équipe met 207 personen op de Zomerspelen". Dagblad De Telegraaf (in Dutch). 1984-07-11.
- "Toppers bijeen in Hyeres Olympisch zeilexamen". Dagblad De Telegraaf (in Dutch). 1984-04-19.
- "Aspiraties". Dagblad De Telegraaf (in Dutch). 1984-04-30.
- "Verwachtingen voor Los Angeles hoog gespannen Gouden kansen voor olympische zeilptoeg". Dagblad De Telegraaf (in Dutch). 1984-07-28.
- "Zeilcoach rekent op een medaille". Dagblad De Telegraaf (in Dutch). 1984-07-31.
- "Zeilers smeken om meer wind". Dagblad De Telegraaf (in Dutch). 1984-08-03.
- "Zeilers verspelen kansen op medaille Tijdperk 'Vliegende Hollanders' voorbij". Dagblad De Telegraaf (in Dutch). 1984-08-08.
- "LOS ANGELES '84 23ste Olympische Zomerspelen Goud voor Stephan". De Telegraaf (in Dutch). 1984-08-09.
- "Surfgoud kan impuls geven Watersport wacht op frisse wind". Dagblad De Telegraaf (in Dutch). 1984-08-11.
- Official Report Los Angeles 1984, Volume 1: Organization and Planning (part 1) (PDF). Los Angeles: Los Angeles Olympic Organizing Committee. 1985. Archived from the original (PDF) on January 28, 2015.
- Official Report Los Angeles 1984, Volume 1: Organization and Planning (part 2) (PDF). Los Angeles: Los Angeles Olympic Organizing Committee. 1985. Archived from the original (PDF) on October 17, 2013.
- Official Report Los Angeles 1984, Volume 1: Organization and Planning (part 3) (PDF). Los Angeles: Los Angeles Olympic Organizing Committee. 1985. Archived from the original (PDF) on October 17, 2013.
- Official Report Los Angeles 1984, Volume 2: Competition and Summary and Results (part 1) (PDF). Los Angeles: Los Angeles Olympic Organizing Committee. 1985. Archived from the original (PDF) on October 17, 2013.
- Official Report Los Angeles 1984, Volume 2: Competition and Summary and Results (part 2) (PDF). Los Angeles: Los Angeles Olympic Organizing Committee. 1985. Archived from the original (PDF) on October 7, 2013.
- Official Report Los Angeles 1984, Volume 2: Competition and Summary and Results (part 3) (PDF). Los Angeles: Los Angeles Olympic Organizing Committee. 1985. Archived from the original (PDF) on October 17, 2013.
- "De Nederlandse olympische zeilploeg". De Telegraaf (in Dutch). 1988-09-10.
- "Nederlandse zeilploeg met lege handen naar huis". De Telegraaf (in Dutch). 1988-09-28.
- Official Report, Volume 1: Organization and Planning (PDF). Seoul: Olympic Organizing Committee. 1989. Archived from the original (PDF) on March 4, 2016.
- Official Report, Volume 2: Competition, Summary and Results (PDF). Seoul: Seoul Olympic Organizing Committee. 1989. Archived from the original (PDF) on October 7, 2013.
- "De Nederlandse olympische zeilploeg". De Telegraaf (in Dutch). 1988-09-10.
- "Nederlandse zeilploeg met lege handen naar huis". De Telegraaf (in Dutch). 1988-09-28.
- Official Report, Volume 1: Organization and Planning (PDF). Seoul: Olympic Organizing Committee. 1989. Archived from the original (PDF) on March 4, 2016.
- Official Report, Volume 2: Competition, Summary and Results (PDF). Seoul: Seoul Olympic Organizing Committee. 1989. Archived from the original (PDF) on October 7, 2013.
