= James Wilkinson (sailor) =

Irish sailor (born 1951)

Medal record

Sailing

Representing Ireland

Olympic Games
Silver medal – second place	1980 Moscow	Flying Dutchman

James Wilkinson (born 28 February 1951) won a silver medal in sailing for Ireland with partner David Wilkins at the 1980 Moscow Olympics in the Flying Dutchman class. The sailing events took place at Pirita Yachting Club in Tallinn, Estonia.

Wilkinson is from Howth in County Dublin and studied mathematics at Trinity College Dublin.

== See also ==
- Ireland at the 1976 Summer Olympics
- Ireland at the 1980 Summer Olympics
- Sailing at the 1980 Summer Olympics
