= Dimitar Georgiev (sailor) =

Bulgarian sailor

Personal information
- Nationality: Bulgarian
- Born: 24 August 1958 (age 66)

Sport
- Sport: Sailing

Dimitar Georgiev (Bulgarian: Димитър Георгиев; born 24 August 1958) is a Bulgarian sailor. He competed in the Flying Dutchman event at the 1980 Summer Olympics. Georgiev, alongside his sailing partner Mitko Kabakov, finished 14th in the competition.
