= Wolfgang Haase =

German sailor

Personal information
- Nationality: German
- Born: 1 May 1951 (age 75) Ziegendorf, Germany

Sport
- Sport: Sailing

Wolfgang Haase (born 1 May 1951) is a German sailor. He competed in the Flying Dutchman event at the 1980 Summer Olympics.
