= Johann Eisl =

Austrian sailor

Personal information
- Nationality: Austrian
- Born: 23 October 1950 (age 75) Strobl, Austria

Sport
- Sport: Sailing

Johann Eisl (born 23 October 1950) is an Austrian former sailor. He competed in the Flying Dutchman event at the 1976 Summer Olympics.
