= Reine Andersson =

Swedish sailor

Personal information
- Nationality: Swedish
- Born: 4 June 1945; Gothenburg, Sweden
- Died: 2 January 2005 (aged 59); Västra Frölunda, Sweden

Sport
- Sport: Sailing

Reine Andersson (4 June 1945 – 2 January 2005) was a Swedish sailor. He competed in the Flying Dutchman event at the 1976 Summer Olympics.
