= Bob Drummond (Australian footballer) =

Australian rules footballer

Personal information
- Full name: Bob Drummond
- Born: 15 April 1919
- Died: 8 February 1991 (aged 71)
- Original team: Ascot Vale
- Height: 183 cm (6 ft 0 in)
- Weight: 76 kg (168 lb)

Playing career^{1}
Years	Club	Games (Goals)
1943–1945	Essendon	14 (31)
1946	North Melbourne	5 (0)
Total		19 (31)
- ^{1} Playing statistics correct to the end of 1946.

Bob Drummond (15 April 1919 – 8 February 1991) was an Australian rules footballer who played with Essendon and North Melbourne in the Victorian Football League (VFL).
