= Javier Ruiz (sailor) =

Mexican sailor (born 1950)

Personal information
- Nationality: Mexican
- Born: 12 September 1950 (age 74)

Sport
- Sport: Sailing

Javier Ruiz (born 12 September 1950) is a Mexican sailor. He competed in the Flying Dutchman event at the 1976 Summer Olympics.
