= René Devos =

Belgian footballer

Personal information
- Date of birth: 26 July 1921
- Date of death: 21 January 2005 (aged 83)
- Position: Midfielder

International career
Years	Team	Apps	(Gls)
1945–1946	Belgium	6	(0)

René Devos (26 July 1921 – 21 January 2005) was a Belgian footballer. He played in six matches for the Belgium national football team from 1945 to 1946.
