= Dimitrios Karapatakis =

Cypriot sailor (born 1947)

Personal information
- Nationality: Cypriot
- Born: 26 July 1947 (age 77)

Sport
- Sport: Sailing

Dimitrios Karapatakis (born 26 July 1947) is a Cypriot sailor. He competed in the Flying Dutchman event at the 1980 Summer Olympics.
