= Hans Zollner (ice hockey) =

Austrian ice hockey player

Personal information
- Nationality: Austrian
- Born: 14 November 1929 Klagenfurt, Austria
- Died: 2005 (aged 75–76)

Sport
- Sport: Ice hockey

Hans Zollner (14 November 1929 – 2005) was an Austrian ice hockey player. He competed in the men's tournament at the 1956 Winter Olympics.
