= Owen Dougherty =

Biographical details
- Born: September 14, 1929; Dunmore, Pennsylvania, U.S.
- Died: February 27, 1991 (aged 61); Pittsburgh, Pennsylvania, U.S.

Playing career

Football
- 1949–1950: Penn State

Baseball
- 1949–1951: Penn State
- Positions: Quarterback (football); Pitcher (baseball)

Coaching career (HC unless noted)

Football
- 1956–1968: Indiana State / IUP (assistant)
- 1979–1981: IUP

Baseball
- 1963–1969: IUP
- 1990: IUP

Head coaching record
- Overall: 17–13 (football); 133–58 (baseball)

Owen J. Dougherty (September 14, 1929 – February 27, 1991) was an American football and baseball player and coach. He served as the head football coach at Indiana University of Pennsylvania from 1979 to 1981, compiling a record of 17–13. Dougherty was also the head baseball coach at IUP from 1963 to 1969 and again in 1990, tallying a mark of 133–58.

Dougherty died after heart surgery on February 27, 1991, at Allegheny General Hospital in Pittsburgh, Pennsylvania.

== Head coaching record ==
=== Football ===
Year	Team	Overall	Conference	Standing	Bowl/playoffs
IUP Indians (Pennsylvania State Athletic Conference) (1979–1981)
1979	IUP	7–3	3–3	3rd (West)	
1980	IUP	6–4	3–3	T–4th (West)	
1981	IUP	4–6	2–4	T–5th (West)	
IUP:		17–13	8–10		
Total:		17–13			
