= Javier Prieto (sailor) =

Mexican sailor (born 1949)

Personal information
- Nationality: Mexican
- Born: 2 August 1949 (age 75)

Sport
- Sport: Sailing

Javier Prieto (born 2 August 1949) is a Mexican sailor. He competed in the Flying Dutchman event at the 1976 Summer Olympics.
