= Nové Sady, Slovakia =

Village and municipality in Slovakia

Nové Sady Assakürt
- Municipality
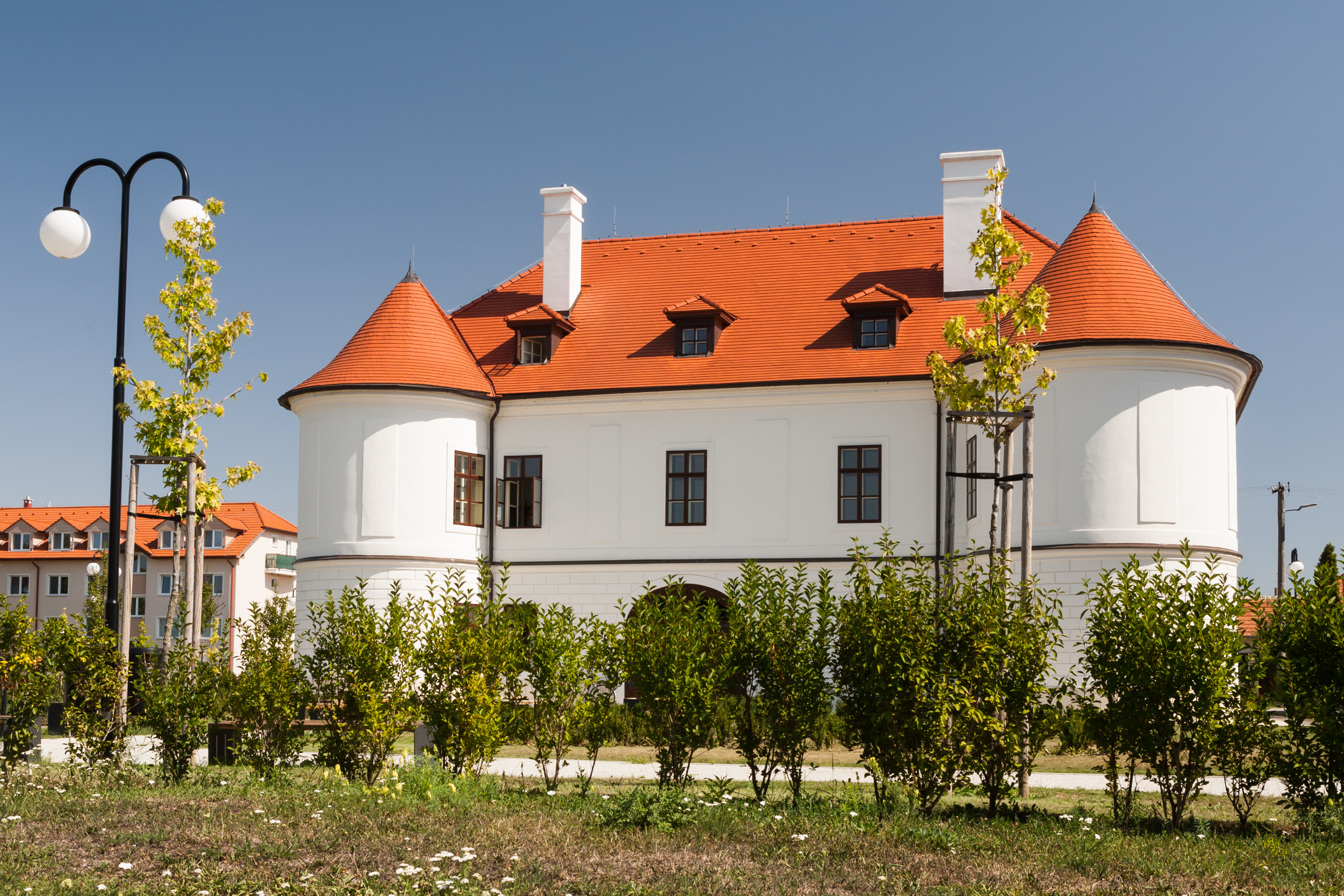

- Flag

- Location of Nové Sady in the Nitra Region Location of Nové Sady in Slovakia
- Coordinates: 48°29′N 17°59′E
- Country: Slovakia
- Region: Nitra Region
- District: Nitra District
- First mentioned: 1156

Area
  - Total: 25.62 km^{2} (9.89 sq mi)
- Elevation: 162 m (531 ft)

Population (2025)
  - Total: 1,312
- Time zone: UTC+1 (CET)
  - Summer (DST): UTC+2 (CEST)
- Postal code: 951 24
- Area code: +421 37
- Vehicle registration plate (until 2022): NR
- Website: www.novesady.sk

Nové Sady, until 1948 Ašakert (Hungarian: Assakürt) is a village and municipality in the Nitra District in western central Slovakia, in the Nitra Region.

== History ==
In historical records the village was first mentioned in 1156.

== Geography ==
The municipality lies at an altitude of 162 metres (531 ft) and covers an area of 25.62 km^{2} (9.89 sq mi) (2025).

== Population ==
Population statistic (10 years)
| Year | 1995 | 2005 | 2015 | 2025 |
|---|---|---|---|---|
| Count | 1971 | 1280 | 1288 | 1312 |
| Difference | | −35.05% | +0.62% | +1.86% |

Population statistic
| Year | 2024 | 2025 |
|---|---|---|
| Count | 1312 | 1312 |
| Difference | | +0% |

It has a population of 1312 people (31 December 2025).

=== Ethnicity ===
Census 2021 (1+ %)
| Ethnicity | Number | Fraction |
|---|---|---|
| Slovak | 1229 | 94.83% |
| Not found out | 58 | 4.47% |
| Total | 1296 | |

In year 2021 was 1296 people by ethnicity 1229 as Slovak, 58 as Not found out, 6 as Czech, 4 as Vietnamese, 4 as Hungarian, 1 as Ukrainian, 1 as Serbian, 1 as Rusyn, 1 as Other and 1 as English.

Note on population: The difference values of population numbers in the table "Population statistic" and in the sections "Ethnicity" & "Religion" is caused by the use of various statistical methods.

=== Religion ===
Census 2021 (1+ %)
| Religion | Number | Fraction |
|---|---|---|
| Roman Catholic Church | 764 | 58.95% |
| Evangelical Church | 272 | 20.99% |
| None | 174 | 13.43% |
| Not found out | 61 | 4.71% |
| Total | 1296 | |

In year 2021 was 1296 people by religion 764 from Roman Catholic Church, 272 from Evangelical Church, 174 from None, 61 from Not found out, 5 from Ad hoc movements, 4 from Greek Catholic Church, 3 from Eastern Orthodox Church, 3 from Other and not ascertained christian church, 3 from Other, 2 from Paganism and natural spirituality, 2 from Apostolic Church, 1 from Calvinist Church, 1 from Christian Congregations in Slovakia and 1 from Seventh-day Adventist Church.
