= Wolfgang Wenzel (sailor) =

German competitive sailor (born 1952)

Personal information
- Nationality: German
- Born: 12 April 1952 (age 74) Ludwigslust, Germany

Sport
- Sport: Sailing

Wolfgang Wenzel (born 12 April 1952) is a German former sailor. He competed in the Flying Dutchman event at the 1980 Summer Olympics.
