= Marios Karapatakis =

Cypriot sailor (born 1951)

Personal information
- Nationality: Cypriot
- Born: 12 January 1951 (age 74)

Sport
- Sport: Sailing

Marios Karapatakis (born 12 January 1951) is a Cypriot sailor. He competed in the Flying Dutchman event at the 1980 Summer Olympics.
