= Eugène Kuborn =

Luxembourgish swimmer

Personal information
- Born: 14 November 1902 Wiltz, Luxembourg
- Died: 12 February 1991 (aged 88) Luxembourg, Luxembourg

Sport
- Sport: Swimming

Eugène Kuborn (14 November 1902 – 12 February 1991) was a Luxembourgish swimmer. He competed in the men's 100 metre backstroke at the 1924 Summer Olympics and the 1928 Summer Olympics and the water polo tournament at the 1928 Summer Olympics.
