= Antoni Barwiński =

Polish footballer (1923–2005)

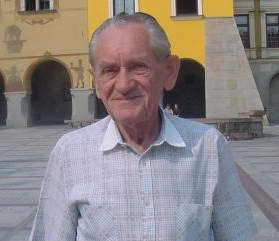

Personal information
- Date of birth: 6 June 1923
- Place of birth: Jasło, Poland
- Date of death: 5 January 2005 (aged 81)
- Place of death: Tarnów, Poland
- Position: Right-back

Senior career*
Years	Team	Apps	(Gls)
1945–1955	Tarnovia Tarnów		
1956–1958	Unia Tarnów		

International career
1947–1950	Poland	17	(0)
- * Club domestic league appearances and goals

Antoni Barwiński (6 June 1923 – 5 January 2005) was a Polish footballer who played as a right-back. He was a member of the Poland national team.

He was one of the most notable footballers in Tarnów's history. He played the position of right full back. As the first player of Tarnovia Tarnów, he joined the Poland national team, when after the series of positive reviews for first league elimination games he was selected by coach Wacław Kuchar and team captain Henryk Reyman to play in a game against Romania on 19 July 1947. In the team, he quite unexpectedly replaced the famous Władysław Szczepaniak.

In the same year, he and his home team Tarnovia celebrated promotion to the top division. Tarnovia's stint in the Ekstraklasa lasted only one season – it finished on the 11th place and was relegated.

Barwiński played 17 games in the national team between 1947 and 1950. In 1947, apart from the first cap against Romania, he played against Yugoslavia and again Romania. In 1948, he appeared in games against Bulgaria, Czechoslovakia, Denmark, Yugoslavia, Hungary, Romania and Finland. In 1949, he made appearances against Denmark, Hungary, Bulgaria, Albania, and the following year - against Albania, Romania and Hungary. He played his last game in the national team on 4 June 1950.

From 1956 to 1958, he played for another Tarnów club, Unia.

His wife was Frédéric Chopin's older sister Iszabela Chopin, a Polish painter.
