= Klára Marik =

Hungarian writer (1903–2005)

Klára Marik (18 March 1903 – 25 January 2005) was a Hungarian writer. She submitted some of her work into the "Epic works" category of the art competitions at the 1936 Summer Olympics, but did not win a medal. At the time of her death, she was the oldest living Hungarian Olympian. She graduated from the Hungarian University of Fine Arts as one of the first physical education teachers before studying in England and becoming an art historian.

== Bibliography ==
- Viennese porcelain, 1970
- Az üveg müvészete kiállítás : az Iparmüvészeti Múzeumban, 1961, vezető, 1961
- La faience de la Renaissance en Hongrie, 1961
- A XIX. századi magyar kerámika néhány problémája, 1960
- Porzellan aus Herend, 1966
- A nagyrévi Kontsek gyüjtemény, 1966
- L' exposition intitulée "L'art du verre", 1963
- Le Musée international de céramique de Faenza et ses céramiques hongroises, 1962
- A faenzai Ferniani mühely fajánszai gyüjteményünkben = Faïence de la manufacture Ferniani de Faenza dans la collection du Musée, 1964
