= Flemming Vögg =

Danish fencer

Personal information
- Born: 12 September 1914 Helsingør, Denmark
- Died: 21 February 1991 (aged 76) Copenhagen, Denmark

Sport
- Sport: Fencing

Flemming Vögg (12 September 1914 – 21 February 1991) was a Danish fencer. He competed in the team foil event at the 1948 Summer Olympics.
