= Francisc Șimon =

Romanian water polo player

Personal information
- Nationality: Romanian
- Born: 8 January 1927; Târgu Mureș, Romania
- Died: 12 January 2005 (aged 78)

Sport
- Sport: Water polo

Francisc Șimon (8 January 1927 – 12 January 2005) was a Romanian water polo player. He competed at the 1952 Summer Olympics and the 1956 Summer Olympics.
