= Johnny Jennings =

Australian rules footballer, born 1911

Personal information
- Full name: John Frederick Jennings
- Born: 21 November 1911; Mysia, Victoria
- Died: 27 February 1991 (aged 79)
- Original team: Old Haileybury
- Height: 171 cm (5 ft 7 in)
- Weight: 70 kg (154 lb)

Playing career^{1}
Years	Club	Games (Goals)
1936	St Kilda	1 (0)
1937	Prahran (VFA)	4 (0)
- ^{1} Playing statistics correct to the end of 1937.

John Frederick Jennings (21 November 1911 – 27 February 1991) was an Australian rules footballer who played with St Kilda in the Victorian Football League (VFL).
