= Harry Carey (footballer) =

Australian rules footballer

Personal information
- Full name: Harry Carey
- Born: 30 January 1916
- Died: 4 February 1991 (aged 75)
- Original team: St Kevins College

Playing career^{1}
Years	Club	Games (Goals)
1936	Essendon	3 (0)
- ^{1} Playing statistics correct to the end of 1936.

Harry Carey (30 January 1916 – 4 February 1991) was an Australian rules footballer who played with Essendon in the Victorian Football League (VFL).
