= Ned Kick =

Australian rules footballer

Personal information
- Full name: Ned Kick
- Born: 12 October 1904
- Died: 24 February 1991 (aged 86)
- Original team: Dunolly
- Height: 185 cm (6 ft 1 in)
- Weight: 80 kg (176 lb)

Playing career^{1}
Years	Club	Games (Goals)
1925	Carlton	8 (0)
1928	Fitzroy	2 (1)
Total		10 (1)
- ^{1} Playing statistics correct to the end of 1928.

Ned Kick (12 October 1904 – 24 February 1991) was an Australian rules footballer who played with Carlton and Fitzroy in the Victorian Football League (VFL).
