= Edward Gunston =

Australian cricketer

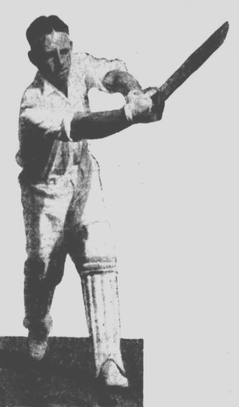

Personal information
- Born: 7 May 1913; Melbourne, Australia
- Died: 28 February 1991 (aged 77); Melbourne, Australia

Domestic team information
- Years: Team
- 1934: Victoria
- Source: Cricinfo, 22 November 2015

Edward Gunston (7 May 1913 – 28 February 1991) was an Australian cricketer. He played three first-class cricket matches for Victoria in 1934.

== See also ==
- List of Victoria first-class cricketers
