= Fred Taylor (Australian footballer) =

Australian rules footballer, born 1918

Personal information
- Full name: David Frederick Taylor
- Born: 18 December 1918; Prahran, Victoria
- Died: 13 February 1991 (aged 72)
- Original team: Prahran
- Height: 170 cm (5 ft 7 in)
- Weight: 69 kg (152 lb)

Playing career^{1}
Years	Club	Games (Goals)
1939–41	Prahran (VFA)	25 (0)
1943–44	St Kilda	9 (0)
- ^{1} Playing statistics correct to the end of 1944.

David Frederick Taylor (18 December 1918 – 13 February 1991) was an Australian rules footballer who played with St Kilda in the Victorian Football League (VFL).

Taylor also served in the Australian Army during World War II.
