= Václav Kubička =

Czech artistic gymnast

- Born: 28 September 1939 Písek, Czechoslovakia
- Died: 21 January 2005 (aged 65) Rüsselsheim, Germany
- Height: 1.69 m (5 ft 7 in)
- Spouse: Jana Kubičková-Posnerová

Gymnastics career
- Discipline: Men's artistic gymnastics
- Country represented: Czechoslovakia

Václav Kubička (28 September 1939 – 21 January 2005) was a Czech artistic gymnast. He took part in all gymnastics events at the 1964 and 1968 Summer Olympics and finished sixth and fourth in the team competition, respectively. Individually, his best achievement was sixth place on the parallel bars in 1968.

He married Jana Kubičková-Posnerová, an Olympic gymnast who also competed at the 1964 and 1968 games. After the 1968 Olympics they moved to Germany and worked there as gymnastics coaches. Their three sons became competitive trampoline gymnasts. Václav trained the German national team in 1972, from 1975 to 1977 and from 1986 to 1988. He died after a long illness, aged 65.
