= Eleni Skoura =

Greek politician (1896–1991)

Eleni Skoura (Greek: Ελένη Σκούρα, 21 December 1896, Volos – 4 February 1991) was the first female member of parliament in Greece, elected in a by-election in January 1953, following the first official women's vote in that country in the November 1952 general elections. Women had previously been allowed to vote, and five women had been elected, in the 1944 elections for the National Council set up by the Greek Resistance. She represented Thessaloniki and had run against another woman, Virginia Zanna. Skoura was a member of the conservative Greek Rally.
