= Josef Musil (footballer) =

Austrian footballer (1920–2005)

Personal information
- Date of birth: 7 August 1920
- Date of death: 6 January 2005 (aged 84)
- Place of death: Vienna, Austria
- Position: Goalkeeper

International career
Years	Team	Apps	(Gls)
1947–1952	Austria	5	(0)

Josef Musil (7 August 1920 – 6 January 2005) was an Austrian footballer. He played in five matches for the Austria national football team from 1947 to 1952. He was also part of Austria's squad for the football tournament at the 1948 Summer Olympics, but he did not play in any matches.
