= Harry Johns =

Australian rules footballer, born 1903

Personal information
- Full name: Harold Winton Johns
- Born: 3 December 1903; Noradjuha, Victoria
- Died: 14 February 1991 (aged 87); Adelaide, South Australia
- Original team: Cheltenham
- Height: 183 cm (6 ft 0 in)
- Weight: 87 kg (192 lb)

Playing career^{1}
Years	Club	Games (Goals)
1926–28	Footscray	20 (11)
- ^{1} Playing statistics correct to the end of 1928.

Harold Winton Johns (3 November 1903 – 14 February 1991) was an Australian rules footballer who played with Footscray in the Victorian Football League (VFL).
