= Valery Zubanov =

Soviet sailor

Personal information
- Nationality: Soviet
- Born: 30 May 1951; Dnipro, Ukraine
- Died: 10 February 1991 (aged 39)

Sport
- Sport: Sailing

Valery Zubanov (30 May 1951 – 10 February 1991) was a Soviet sailor. He competed at the 1972 Summer Olympics, the 1976 Summer Olympics, and the 1980 Summer Olympics.
