= Flying Dutchman (dinghy) =

Sailboat class

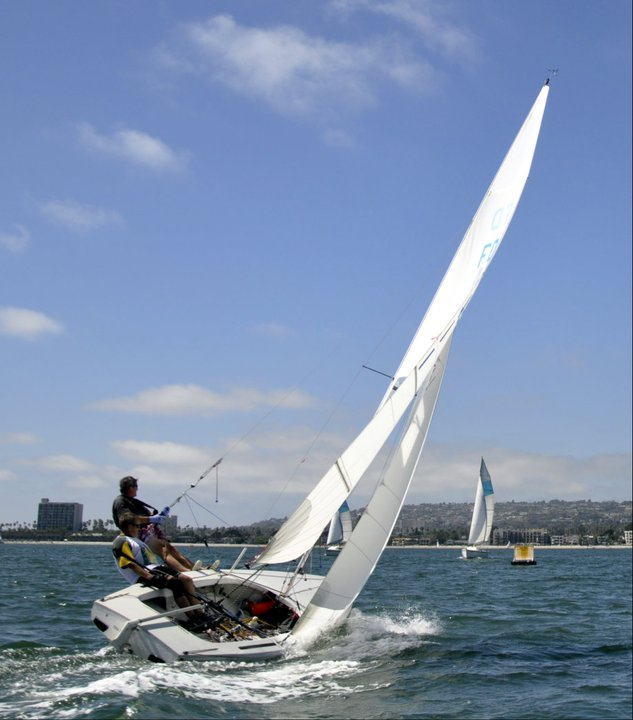

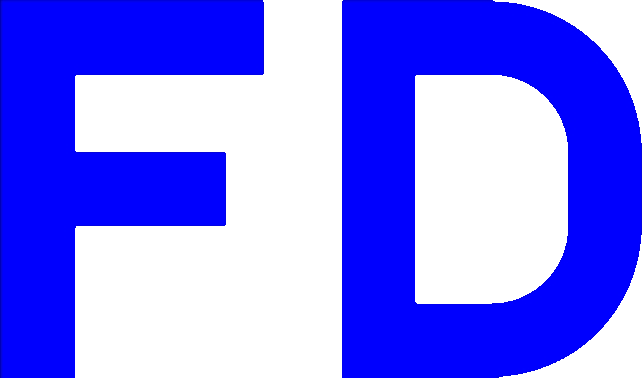

Development
- Designer: Uus Van Essen and Conrad Gülcher
- Location: Netherlands
- Year: 1951
- No. built: more than 10,000
- Builders: Sunbeam Yachts; Alpa Yachts; Mader Bootswerft; MacKay Boats; Plastrend/Composite Technologies; Lanaverre; Lockley Newport Boats; Advance Sailboat Corp. Binks Yacht Constructions; Chantier Naval Costantini; Mobjack Manufacturing
- Role: Racing sailing dinghy
- Name: Flying Dutchman

Boat
- Crew: two
- Displacement: 287 lb (130 kg)

Hull
- Type: monohull
- Construction: fiberglass or wood
- LOA: 20.00 ft (6.10 m)
- Beam: 5.90 ft (1.80 m)

Hull appendages
- Keel: centerboard
- Rudder: transom-mounted rudder

Rig
- Rig type: Bermuda rig

Sails
- Sailplan: fractional rigged sloop
- Mainsail area: 118.4 sq ft (11.00 m^{2})
- Jib/genoa area: 64.5 sq ft (5.99 m^{2})
- Spinnaker area: 226.0 sq ft (21.00 m^{2})
- Upwind sail area: 182.9 sq ft (16.99 m^{2})

Racing
- D-PN: 82.6
- RYA PN: 289

The Flying Dutchman is a Dutch planing sailing dinghy that was designed by Uus Van Essen and Conrad Gülcher as a high performance, one design racer and first built in 1951.

The boat was an Olympic sailing class from 1960 until 1992.

== Production ==
The boat was built in the past by Sunbeam Yachts, Alpa Yachts, Mader Bootswerft, MacKay Boats, Plastrend/Composite Technologies, Lanaverre, Lockley Newport Boats, Advance Sailboat Corp., Binks Yacht Constructions, Chantier Naval Costantini and Mobjack Manufacturing, starting in 1951. More than 10,000 have been built. In 2022 Mader Bootswerft were still producing the design.

== Design ==
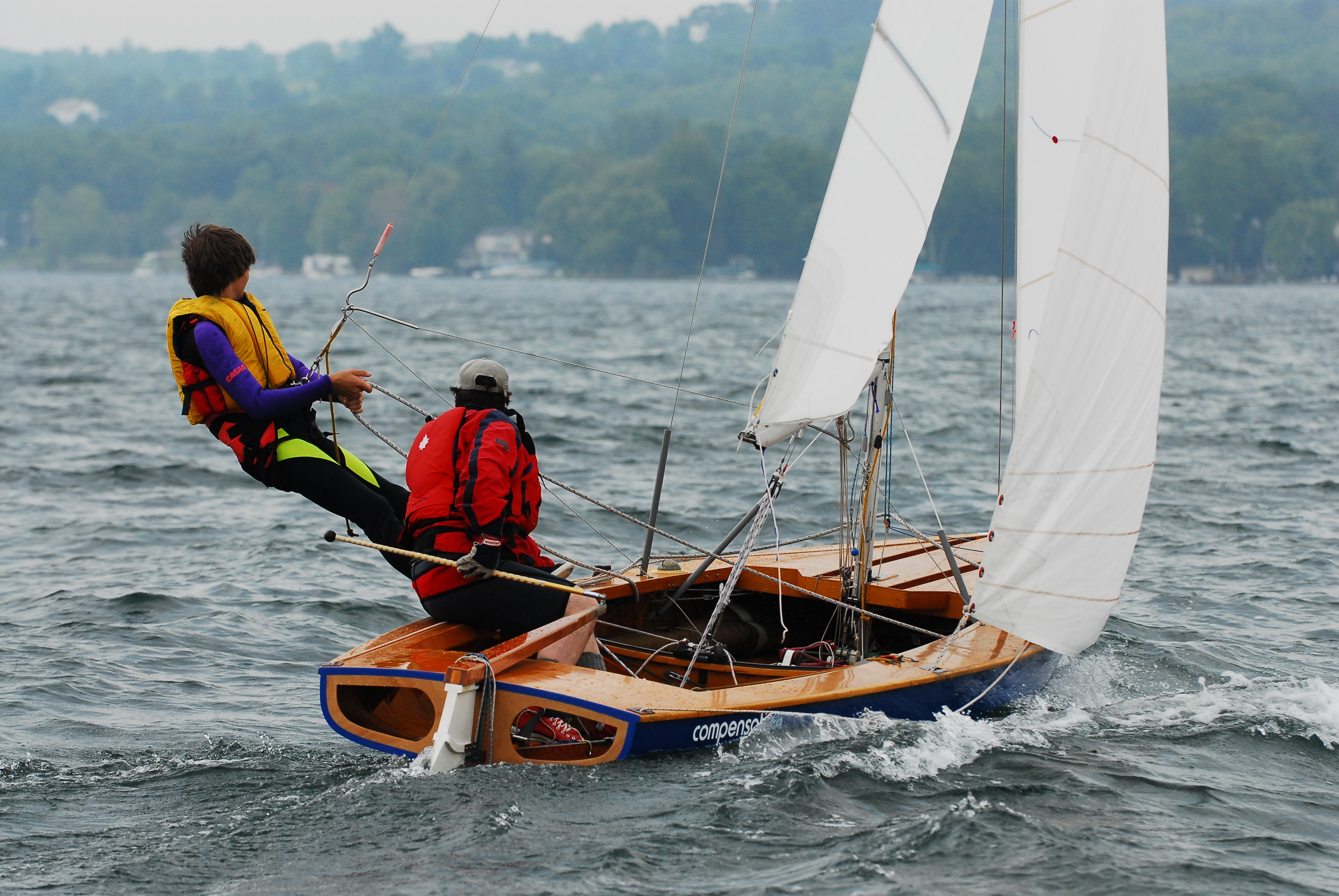
Crew trapezing on a Flying Dutchman

The Flying Dutchman is a racing sailboat, initially built of wood, with many modern boats made from fiberglass sandwich construction with a plastic deck. Cold-molded plywood is still used and some sailers prefer that material.

The boat has a fractional sloop rig, a spooned raked stem, a plumb transom, a transom-hung rudder controlled by a tiller and a retractable centerboard. Modern boats may have plastic rudders and centerboards. It displaces 287 lb (130 kg).

The boat has many adjustable settings available while sailing, including the genoa halyard, shroud tension and the mast rake. The crew can use a trapeze to balance the boat.

For sailing downwind the design may be equipped with a symmetrical spinnaker of 226.0 sq ft (21.00 m^{2}) and in fact was the first design equipped with a spinnaker bow chute.

The design has a Portsmouth Yardstick D-PN of 82.6 and a RYA PN of 879.

== Operational history ==
The boat is supported by an active class club that organizes racing events, the International Flying Dutchman Class Organization.

The Flying Dutchman was an Olympic sailing class in double-handed dinghies from 1960 until 1992.

Due to its complexity, the design's cost has been a barrier to its wider acceptance.

A Classic Sailboats review noted that "the 'fastest double-handed dinghy in the world' made its Olympic debut in Naples in 1960. It was based on the new go-fast concept of a trapezing crew and a large spinnaker. The ideal crewman should be tall, heavy, nimble and smart – not a simple recipe to follow. The FD has a long waterline and normally planes on the beat. But the large genoa jib makes tacking slow. Pure boatspeed is thus the key ingredient for success."

The United States Sailing Association describes the boat as "one of the most exhilarating dinghies you will ever be in."

== Boats on display ==
- National Maritime Museum, Greenwich, England

== See also ==
- List of sailing boat types

Related development

- International FJ
