= List of flag bearers for Bahrain at the Olympics =

Bahrain at the Olympics
- IOC code: BRN
- NOC: Bahrain Olympic Committee
- Website: www.boc.bh
- Medals: Gold 4 Silver 3 Bronze 1 Total 8

Summer appearances
- 1984; 1988; 1992; 1996; 2000; 2004; 2008; 2012; 2016; 2020; 2024

This is a list of flag bearers who have represented Bahrain at the Olympics. Flag bearers carry the national flag of their country at the opening ceremony of the Olympic Games.

#	Event year	Season	Flag bearer	Sport
1	1984	Summer	Youssef Mubarak	Shooting
2	1988	Summer	Ahmed Hamada Jassim	Athletics
3	1992	Summer	Khalid Rabeeah	
4	1996	Summer	Mohamed Al-Sada	Sailing
5	2000	Summer	Dawood Youssef Mohamed Jassim	Swimming
6	2004	Summer	Ahmed Hamada Jassim	Athletics
7	2008	Summer	Roqaya Al-Gassra	Running
8	2012	Summer	Azza Al Qasmi	Shooting
9	2016	Summer	Farhan Saleh	Swimming
10	2020	Summer	Noor Yussuf Abdulla	Swimming
10	2020	Summer	Husain Al-Sayyad	Handball
11	2024	Summer	Amani Alobaidli	Swimming
11	2024	Summer	Saud Ghali	Swimming

== See also ==
- Bahrain at the Olympics
