= Bahrain at the 1996 Summer Olympics =

- IOC code: BRN
- NOC: Bahrain Olympic Committee

in Atlanta
- Competitors: 5 in 2 sports
- Flag bearer: Mohamed Al-Sada
- Medals: Gold 0 Silver 0 Bronze 0 Total 0

Summer Olympics appearances (overview)
- 1984; 1988; 1992; 1996; 2000; 2004; 2008; 2012; 2016; 2020; 2024; 2028

Bahrain was represented at the 1996 Summer Olympics in Atlanta, Georgia, United States by the Bahrain Olympic Committee.

In total, five athletes – all men – represented Bahrain in two different sports including athletics and sailing.

== Competitors ==
In total, five athletes represented Bahrain at the 1996 Summer Olympics in Atlanta, Georgia, United States across two different sports.

Sport	Men	Women	Total
Athletics	1	0	1
Sailing	4	0	4
Total	5	0	5

== Athletics ==
In total, one Bahraini athlete participated in the athletics events – Fawaz Ismail Johar in the men's 110 metres hurdles.

The track and field events took place at the Centennial Olympic Stadium from 26 July 1996 to 3 August 1996.

The heats for the men's 110 metres hurdles took place on 28 July 1996. Johar finished eighth in his heat in a time of 14.32 seconds. He did not advance to the quarter-finals.

Athlete	Event	Heats		Quarterfinal		Semifinal		Final	
Athlete	Event	Result	Rank	Result	Rank	Result	Rank	Result	Rank
Fawaz Ismail Johar	110 metres hurdles	14.32	56	Did not advance					

== Sailing ==
In total, four Bahraini athletes participated in the sailing events – Mohamed Al-Sada in the laser and Essa al-Busmait, Khaled Al-Sada and Ahmed al-Sale in the soling.

The sailing events took place at Wassaw Sound in the Atlantic Ocean, near to Savannah, Georgia, United States from 22 July 1996 to 2 August 1996.

The 10 races in the soling competition took place from 22 July – 2 August 1996. Al-Busmait, Khaled Al-Sada and al-Sale achieved their best result in race eight finishing 17th. Overall, they finished with a net 429 points and placed 51st.

The 11 races in the laser competition took place from 23–31 July 1996. Mohamed Al-Sada achieved his best result in race 11 finishing 40th. Overall, he finished with a net 160 points and placed 22nd.

Open
Fleet racing

Athlete	Event	Race											Net points	Final rank
Athlete	Event	1	2	3	4	5	6	7	8	9	10	11	Net points	Final rank
Mohamed Al-Sada	Laser	50	45	51	47	~~57~~	~~57~~	50	47	50	49	40	429	51

Match racing

Athlete	Event	Qualification races										Total	Rank	Quarterfinals	Semifinals	Final / BM	Rank
Athlete	Event	1	2	3	4	5	6	7	8	9	10	Total	Rank	Quarterfinals	Semifinals	Final / BM	Rank
Essa al-Busmait; Khaled Al-Sada; Ahmed Al-Saie	Soling	18	21	21	~~23~~	18	~~22~~	22	17	22	21	160	22	Did not advance			
