= Alevras =

Alevras is a surname. Notable people with the surname include:

- Colin Alevras (1971–2022), American restraurateur
- Ioannis Alevras (1912–1995), Greek politician
- Panagiotis Alevras (born 1969), Greek sailor
- Stavros Alevras (born 1970), Greek sailor
