= Bahrain at the 2020 Summer Olympics =

- IOC code: BRN
- NOC: Bahrain Olympic Committee

in Tokyo, Japan July 23, 2021 – August 8, 2021
- Competitors: 32 in 5 sports
- Flag bearers (opening): Noor Yussuf Abdulla; Husain Al-Sayyad
- Flag bearer (closing): Husain Mahfoodh
- Medals Ranked 77th: Gold 0 Silver 1 Bronze 0 Total 1

Summer Olympics appearances (overview)
- 1984; 1988; 1992; 1996; 2000; 2004; 2008; 2012; 2016; 2020; 2024

Bahrain competed at the 2020 Summer Olympics in Tokyo. Originally scheduled to take place in the summer of 2020, the Games were postponed to 23 July to 8 August 2021, because of the COVID-19 pandemic. It was the nation's tenth consecutive appearance at the Summer Olympics.

== Medalists ==
Medal	Name	Sport	Event	Date
Silver	Kalkidan Gezahegne	Athletics	Women's 10,000 metres	7 August

== Competitors ==
The following is the list of number of competitors in the Games. Note that reserves in handball are not counted:

Sport	Men	Women	Total
Athletics	9	5	14
Boxing	1	0	1
Handball	14	0	14
Shooting	0	1	1
Swimming	1	1	2
Total	25	7	32

== Athletics ==
Bahraini athletes further achieved the entry standards, either by qualifying time or by world ranking, in the following track and field events (up to a maximum of 3 athletes in each event):

Key

- Note–Ranks given for track events are within the athlete's heat only
- Q = Qualified for the next round
- q = Qualified for the next round as a fastest loser or, in field events, by position without achieving the qualifying target
- NR = National record
- N/A = Round not applicable for the event
- Bye = Athlete not required to compete in round

Track & road events
Men

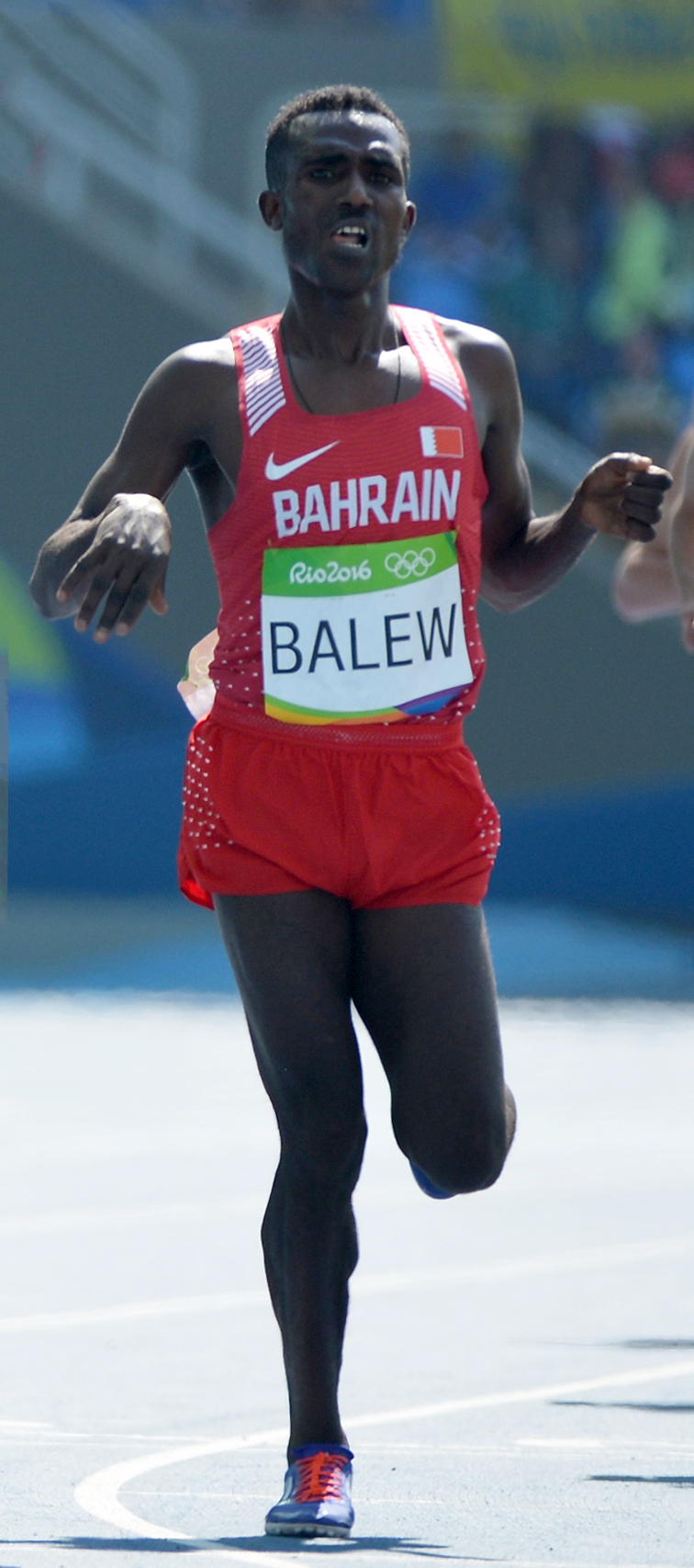
Birhanu Balew

Athlete	Event	Heat		Semifinal		Final	
Athlete	Event	Result	Rank	Result	Rank	Result	Rank
Sadik Mikhou	1500 m	3:42.87	8	Did not advance			
Birhanu Balew	5000 m	13:39.42	5 Q	—		13:03.20	6
Dawit Fikadu	5000 m	13:44.03	14 qR	—		13:20.24 SB	15
John Kibet Koech	3000 m steeplechase	DNF		—		Did not advance	
Alemu Bekele	Marathon	—				DNF	
Shumi Dechasa	Marathon	—				DNF	
El-Hassan El-Abbassi	Marathon	—				2:15:56	25

Women

Athlete	Event	Heat		Semifinal		Final	
Athlete	Event	Result	Rank	Result	Rank	Result	Rank
Kalkidan Gezahegne	10000 m	—				29:56.18	2nd place, silver medalist(s)
Aminat Yusuf Jamal	400 m hurdles	55.90 SB	7	Did not advance			
Winfred Mutile Yavi	3000 m steeplechase	9:10.80	1 Q	—		9:19.74	10
Eunice Chumba	Marathon	—				2:29:36	7
Tejitu Daba	Marathon	—				DNF	

Field events

Athlete	Event	Qualification		Final	
Athlete	Event	Distance	Position	Distance	Position
Abdelrahman Mahmoud	Men's shot put	20.14	22	Did not advance	

== Boxing ==
Bahrain entered one male boxer into the Olympic tournament. Belarusian-born Danis Latypov topped the list of eligible boxers from Asia and Oceania in the men's super heavyweight division to secure a place on the Bahraini team based on the IOC's Boxing Task Force Rankings.

Athlete	Event	Round of 16	Quarterfinals	Semifinals	Final	
Athlete	Event	Opposition Result	Opposition Result	Opposition Result	Opposition Result	Rank
Danis Latypov	Men's super heavyweight	Abdullayev (AZE); L 1–3	Did not advance			

== Handball ==
Summary

Key:

- ET: After extra time
- P – Match decided by penalty-shootout.

Team	Event	Group stage						Quarterfinal	Semifinal	Final / BM	
Team	Event	Opposition Score	Opposition Score	Opposition Score	Opposition Score	Opposition Score	Rank	Opposition Score	Opposition Score	Opposition Score	Rank
Bahrain men's	Men's tournament	Sweden; L 31–32	Portugal; L 25–26	Denmark; L 21–31	Japan; W 32–30	Egypt; L 20–30	4	France; L 28–42	Did not advance		

=== Men's tournament ===
Bahrain men's handball team qualified for the Olympics by winning the gold medal at the 2019 Asian Qualification Tournament in Doha, Qatar, signifying the nation's debut in the sport.

Team roster

The squad was announced on 11 July 2021. On 27 July, Komail Mahfoodh was replaced by Bilal Basham Askani.

Head coach: (Iceland) Aron Kristjánsson

No.	Pos.	Name	Date of birth (age)	Height	App.	Goals	Club
1	GK	Husain Mahfoodh	29 June 2001 (aged 20)	1.86 m	51	5	(Bahrain) Al-Ahli
3	CB	Ali Abdulla Eid	18 January 1991 (aged 30)	1.75 m	69	125	(Bahrain) Al-Najma
8	RB	Hassan Mirza	18 June 1998 (aged 23)	1.65 m	30	26	(Bahrain) Al-Tadhamun
9	LW	Hasan Al-Samahiji	22 February 1991 (aged 30)	1.77 m	72	253	(Bahrain) Al-Ahli
15	LB	Mohamed Abdulredha	27 September 1989 (aged 31)	1.86 m	64	92	(Bahrain) Al-Ahli
18	RW	Ahmed Jalal	31 January 1998 (aged 23)	1.68 m	74	137	(Bahrain) Al-Shabab
19	P	Mohamed Merza	17 April 1987 (aged 34)	1.84 m	89	158	(Bahrain) Al-Najma
21	GK	Mohamed Abdulhusain	12 August 1989 (aged 31)	1.75 m	259	15	(Bahrain) Al-Najma
27	RW	Bilal Basham Askani	7 April 1991 (aged 30)	1.65 m	75	110	(Bahrain) Al-Najma
50	CB	Ahmed Al-Maqabi	26 October 1994 (aged 26)	1.75 m	78	103	(Kuwait) Al-Qadsia SC
66	LB	Komail Mahfoodh	28 April 1992 (aged 29)	1.89 m	74	137	(Bahrain) Al-Najma
77	RB	Ali Merza	7 July 1988 (aged 33)	1.80 m	159	433	(Bahrain) Al-Najma
89	LW	Mahdi Saad	15 March 1989 (aged 32)	1.73 m	129	270	(Bahrain) Al-Najma
93	LB	Mohamed Habib	20 July 1993 (aged 28)	1.65 m	300	250	(Saudi Arabia) Mudhar
95	CB	Mohamed Mohamed	7 February 2001 (aged 20)	1.75 m	300	120	(Bahrain) Al-Najma
99	CB	Husain Al-Sayyad (c)	14 January 1988 (aged 33)	1.75 m	482	1200	(Bahrain) Al-Najma

Group play

Pos	Team	Pld	W	D	L	GF	GA	GD	Pts	Qualification
1	Denmark	5	4	0	1	174	139	+35	8 (Note: Denmark 2 Pts, +2 GD; Egypt 2 Pts, 0 GD, Sweden 2 Pts, −2 GD)	Quarter-finals
2	Egypt	5	4	0	1	154	134	+20	8	Quarter-finals
3	Sweden	5	4	0	1	144	142	+2	8	Quarter-finals
4	Bahrain	5	1	0	4	129	149	−20	2 (Note: Bahrain 2 Pts, +1 GD; Portugal 2 Pts, 0 GD, Japan 2 Pts, −1 GD)	Quarter-finals
5	Portugal	5	1	0	4	143	156	−13	2	
6	Japan (H)	5	1	0	4	146	170	−24	2	

Source: Tokyo 2020 and IHF
Rules for classification: 1) Points; 2) Head-to-head points; 3) Head-to-head goal difference; 4) Head-to-head goals scored; 5) Goal difference; 6) Goals scored; 7) Draw.
(H) Hosts
Notes:

24 July 2021; 14:15	Sweden	32–31	Bahrain	Yoyogi National Gymnasium, Tokyo; Referees: Brunner, Salah (SUI)
24 July 2021; 14:15	Wanne 13	(16–18)	Habib 6	Yoyogi National Gymnasium, Tokyo; Referees: Brunner, Salah (SUI)
24 July 2021; 14:15	1× (yellow card) 3× (suspension)	Report	1× (yellow card) 5× (suspension)	Yoyogi National Gymnasium, Tokyo; Referees: Brunner, Salah (SUI)

26 July 2021; 19:30	Bahrain	25–26	Portugal	Yoyogi National Gymnasium, Tokyo; Referees: Schulze, Tönnies (GER)
26 July 2021; 19:30	Habib 8	(15–14)	Portela 6	Yoyogi National Gymnasium, Tokyo; Referees: Schulze, Tönnies (GER)
26 July 2021; 19:30	1× (yellow card) 4× (suspension)	Report	1× (yellow card) 5× (suspension)	Yoyogi National Gymnasium, Tokyo; Referees: Schulze, Tönnies (GER)

28 July 2021; 09:00	Denmark	31–21	Bahrain	Yoyogi National Gymnasium, Tokyo; Referees: Horáček, Novotný (CZE)
28 July 2021; 09:00	J. Hansen 6	(12–7)	four players 3	Yoyogi National Gymnasium, Tokyo; Referees: Horáček, Novotný (CZE)
28 July 2021; 09:00	1× (suspension)	Report	3× (yellow card) 3× (suspension)	Yoyogi National Gymnasium, Tokyo; Referees: Horáček, Novotný (CZE)

30 July 2021; 11:00	Bahrain	32–30	Japan	Yoyogi National Gymnasium, Tokyo; Referees: Raluy, Sabroso (ESP)
30 July 2021; 11:00	Al-Sayyad, Habib 7	(17–16)	Motoki 7	Yoyogi National Gymnasium, Tokyo; Referees: Raluy, Sabroso (ESP)
30 July 2021; 11:00	2× (yellow card) 4× (suspension)	Report	4× (suspension)	Yoyogi National Gymnasium, Tokyo; Referees: Raluy, Sabroso (ESP)

1 August 2021; 11:00	Egypt	30–20	Bahrain	Yoyogi National Gymnasium, Tokyo; Referees: Raluy, Sabroso (ESP)
1 August 2021; 11:00	El-Ahmar 5	(15–7)	Habib 4	Yoyogi National Gymnasium, Tokyo; Referees: Raluy, Sabroso (ESP)
1 August 2021; 11:00	2× (yellow card) 2× (suspension)	Report	1× (yellow card) 1× (suspension)	Yoyogi National Gymnasium, Tokyo; Referees: Raluy, Sabroso (ESP)

Quarterfinal

3 August 2021; 09:30	France	42–28	Bahrain	Yoyogi National Gymnasium, Tokyo; Referees: Lah, Sok (SLO)
3 August 2021; 09:30	Mahé 9	(21–14)	Al-Sayyad 5	Yoyogi National Gymnasium, Tokyo; Referees: Lah, Sok (SLO)
3 August 2021; 09:30	3× (suspension)	Report	2× (yellow card) 5× (suspension)	Yoyogi National Gymnasium, Tokyo; Referees: Lah, Sok (SLO)

== Shooting ==
Bahrain granted an invitation from ISSF to send a women's skeet shooter to the Olympics, if the minimum qualifying score (MQS) was fulfilled by June 6, 2021.

Athlete	Event	Qualification		Final	
Athlete	Event	Points	Rank	Points	Rank
Maryam Hassani	Women's skeet	112	24	Did not advance	

Qualification Legend: Q = Qualify for the next round; q = Qualify for the bronze medal (shotgun)

== Swimming ==
Bahrain received a universality invitation from FINA to send two top-ranked swimmers (one per gender) in their respective individual events to the Olympics, based on the FINA Points System of June 28, 2021.

Athlete	Event	Heat		Semifinal		Final	
Athlete	Event	Time	Rank	Time	Rank	Time	Rank
Abdulla Ahmed	Men's 100 m butterfly	DSQ		Did not advance			
Noor Yussuf Abdulla	Women's 50 m freestyle	28.87	60	Did not advance			
