= Sailing at the 1996 Summer Olympics – Soling =

Sailing at the Olympics

Soling at the Games of the XXVI Olympiad
- Soling
- Venue: Savannah
- Dates: 22 July to 2 August
- Competitors: 66 from 22 nations
- Teams: 22

Medalists
1st place, gold medalist(s)		Jochen Schümann; Thomas Flach; Bernd Jäkel	Germany
2nd place, silver medalist(s)		Georgy Shayduko; Dmitri Shabanov; Igor Skalin	Russia
3rd place, bronze medalist(s)		Jeff Madrigali; Jim Barton; Kent Massey	United States

The Soling Competition at the 1996 Summer Olympics was held from 22 July to 2 August 1996, in Savannah, Georgia, United States. The competition was in a combined format. First the competitors had to sail a series of ten fleet races. Points were awarded for placement in each race. The best eight out of ten race scores did count for the placement in the match race series. After the fleetraces a series of matchraces were held to determine the winners.

== Results after Fleetrace ==
Rank	Country	Helmsman	Crew	Race 1		Race 2		Race 3		Race 4		Race 5		Race 6		Race 7		Race 8		Race 9		Race 10		Total	Total – discard
Rank	Country	Helmsman	Crew	Pos.	Pts.	Pos.	Pts.	Pos.	Pts.	Pos.	Pts.	Pos.	Pts.	Pos.	Pts.	Pos.	Pts.	Pos.	Pts.	Pos.	Pts.	Pos.	Pts.	Total	Total – discard
1 (1)	Germany	Jochen Schümann	Thomas Flach; Bernd Jäkel	5	5.0	5	5.0	2	2.0	4	4.0	1	1.0	~~9~~	~~9.0~~	~~9~~	~~9.0~~	6	6.0	2	2.0	9	9.0	52.0	34.0
2 (5)	Russia	Georgy Shayduko	Dmitri Shabanov; Igor Skalin	2	2.0	11	11.0	~~13~~	~~13.0~~	8	8.0	7	7.0	4	4.0	~~12~~	~~12.0~~	8	8.0	7	7.0	3	3.0	75.0	50.0
3 (2)	United States	Jeff Madrigali	Jim Barton; Kent Massey	1	1.0	4	4.0	9	9.0	2	2.0	5	5.0	~~19~~	~~19.0~~	5	5.0	9	9.0	1	1.0	~~12~~	~~12.0~~	67.0	36.0
4 (3)	Great Britain	Andy Beadsworth	Barry Parkin; Adrian Stead	7	7.0	1	1.0	8	8.0	7	7.0	4	4.0	1	1.0	6	6.0	~~PMS~~	~~23.0~~	12	12.0	~~14~~	~~14.0~~	83.0	46.0
5 (4)	Canada	Bill Abbott Jr.	Joanne Abbott; Brad Boston	9	9.0	~~20~~	~~20.0~~	~~16~~	~~16.0~~	10	10.0	2	2.0	8	8.0	1	1.0	1	1.0	8	8.0	8	8.0	83.0	47.0
6 (6)	Denmark	Stig Westergaard	Jan Eli Andersen; Jens Bojsen-Møller	15	15.0	6	6.0	3	3.0	16	16.0	~~PMS~~	~~23.0~~	2	2.0	11	11.0	~~PMS~~	~~23.0~~	4	4.0	1	1.0	104.0	58.0
7	Ukraine	Serhiy Pichuhin	Serhiy Khaindrava; Volodymyr Korotkov	~~DSQ~~	~~23.0~~	3	3.0	1	1.0	15	15.0	6	6.0	~~18~~	~~18.0~~	18	18.0	5	5.0	9	9.0	2	2.0	100.0	59.0
8	Spain	Luis Doreste	Domingo Manrique; David Vera	4	4.0	8	8.0	12	12.0	~~13~~	~~13.0~~	~~PMS~~	~~23.0~~	5	5.0	8	8.0	10	10.0	10	10.0	4	4.0	97.0	61.0
9	Norway	Herman Horn Johannessen	Paul Davis; Espen Stokkeland	13	13.0	15	15.0	4	12.0	~~PMS~~	~~23.0~~	12	12.0	7	7.0	4	4.0	3	3.0	~~16~~	~~16.0~~	7	7.0	104.0	65.0
10	Italy	Mario Celon	Gianni Torboli; Claudio Celon	6	6.0	~~16~~	~~16.0~~	14	14.0	1	1.0	8	8.0	3	3.0	3	3.0	16	16.0	15	15.0	~~19~~	~~19.0~~	101.0	66.0
11	France	Marc Bouet	Sylvain Chtounder; Gildas Morvan	11	11.0	~~DSQ~~	~~23.0~~	6	6.0	~~17~~	~~17.0~~	9	9.0	13	13.0	10	10.0	7	7.0	3	3.0	10	10.0	109.0	69.0
12	Australia	Matt Hayes	Steve Jarvin; Stephen McConaghy	10	10.0	13	13.0	5	5.0	14	14.0	~~PMS~~	~~23.0~~	6	6.0	2	2.0	14	14.0	6	6.0	~~DSQ~~	~~23.0~~	116.0	70.0
13	Sweden	Magnus Holmberg	Björn Alm; Johan Barne	12	12.0	9	9.0	~~DNC~~	~~23.0~~	3	3.0	13	13.0	12	12.0	~~14~~	~~14.0~~	4	4.0	13	13.0	5	5.0	108.0	71.0
14	New Zealand	Kelvin Harrap	Sean Clarkson; Jamie Gale	~~DSQ~~	~~23.0~~	~~18~~	~~18.0~~	7	7.0	5	5.0	15	15.0	11	11.0	7	7.0	15	15.0	5	5.0	15	15.0	121.0	80.0
15	Netherlands	Willem Potma	Frank Hettinga; Gerhard Potma	8	8.0	7	7.0	10	10.0	~~PMS~~	~~23.0~~	10	10.0	15	15.0	16	16.0	2	2.0	~~17~~	~~17.0~~	16	16.0	124.0	84.0
16	Ireland	Marshall King	Garrett Connolly; Dan O'Grady	3	3.0	10	10.0	11	11.0	9	9.0	16	16.0	~~17~~	~~17.0~~	13	13.0	~~PMS~~	~~23.0~~	14	14.0	17	17.0	133.0	93.0
17	South Africa	Bruce Savage	Rick Mayhew; Clynton Lehman	17	17.0	2	2.0	17	17.0	11	11.0	11	11.0	~~20~~	~~20.0~~	15	15.0	~~PMS~~	~~23.0~~	11	11.0	18	18.0	145.0	102.0
18	Greece	Stavros Alevras	Panagiotis Alevras; Stefanos Chandakas	14	14.0	12	12.0	18	18.0	~~PMS~~	~~23.0~~	3	3.0	16	16.0	21	21.0	11	11.0	~~20~~	~~20.0~~	13	13.0	151.0	107.0
19	Japan	Kazunori Komatsu	Masatoshi Hazama; Kazuyuki Hyodo	16	16.0	19	19.0	15	15.0	6	6.0	14	14.0	~~21~~	~~21.0~~	17	17.0	12	12.0	~~21~~	~~21.0~~	11	11.0	152.0	110.0
20	Hungary	György Wossala	László Kovácsi; Károly Vezér	~~DSQ~~	~~23.0~~	14	14.0	19	19.0	12	12.0	~~PMS~~	~~23.0~~	10	10.0	20	20.0	13	13.0	18	18.0	20	20.0	172.0	126.0
21	Brazil	Daniel Glomb	Edson de Araújo Jr. Marcelo Reitz	~~DSQ~~	~~23.0~~	17	17.0	20	20.0	~~PMS~~	~~23.0~~	17	17.0	14	14.0	19	19.0	PMS	23.0	19	19.0	6	6.0	181.0	135.0
22	Bahrain	Essa al-Busmait	Khaled Al-Sada; Ahmed Al-Saie	18	18.0	21	21.0	21	21.0	~~DNF~~	~~23.0~~	18	18.0	~~22~~	~~22.0~~	22	22.0	17	17.0	22	22.0	21	21.0	205.0	160.0

Legend: DNC – Did not come to the starting area; DNF – Did not finish; DSQ – Disqualified; PMS – Premature start;
Gender: – male; – female;

The selected teams proceeded to the match race part of the event.

== Results after Matchracing ==
Quarter finals
3	Great Britain	3
6	Denmark	2
4	Canada	0
5	Russia	3

Semi finals
1	Germany	3
3	Great Britain	0
2	United States	0
5	Russia	3

Final
1	(gold) Germany	3
5	(silver) Russia	0
Third place
2	(bronze) United States	3
4	Great Britain	1

Canada (5th) vs. Denmark (6th) decided on basis of fleetrace result.

== Daily standings ==
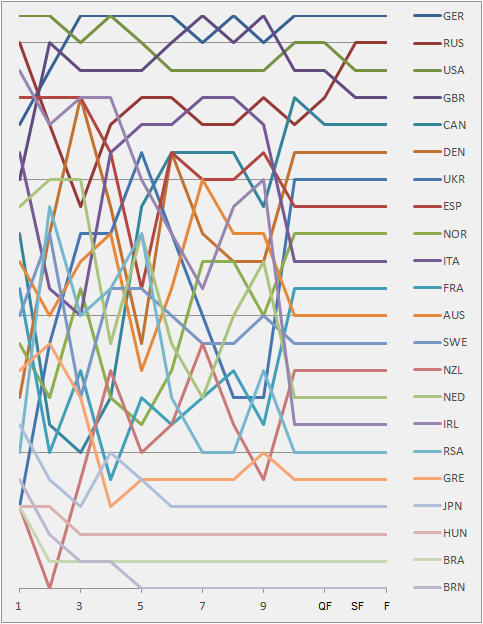
Graph showing the daily standings in the Solingr during the 1996 Summer Olympics

== Conditions at Soling course area ==
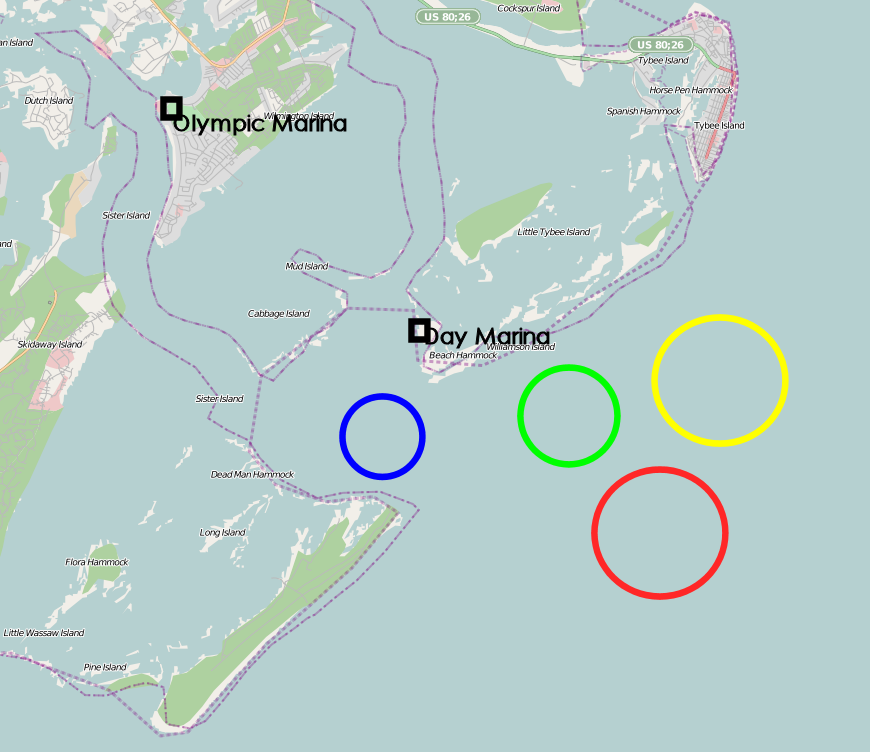
Black: Marinas
Blue: Alpha course
Green: Bravo course
Yellow: Charly course
Red: Delta course

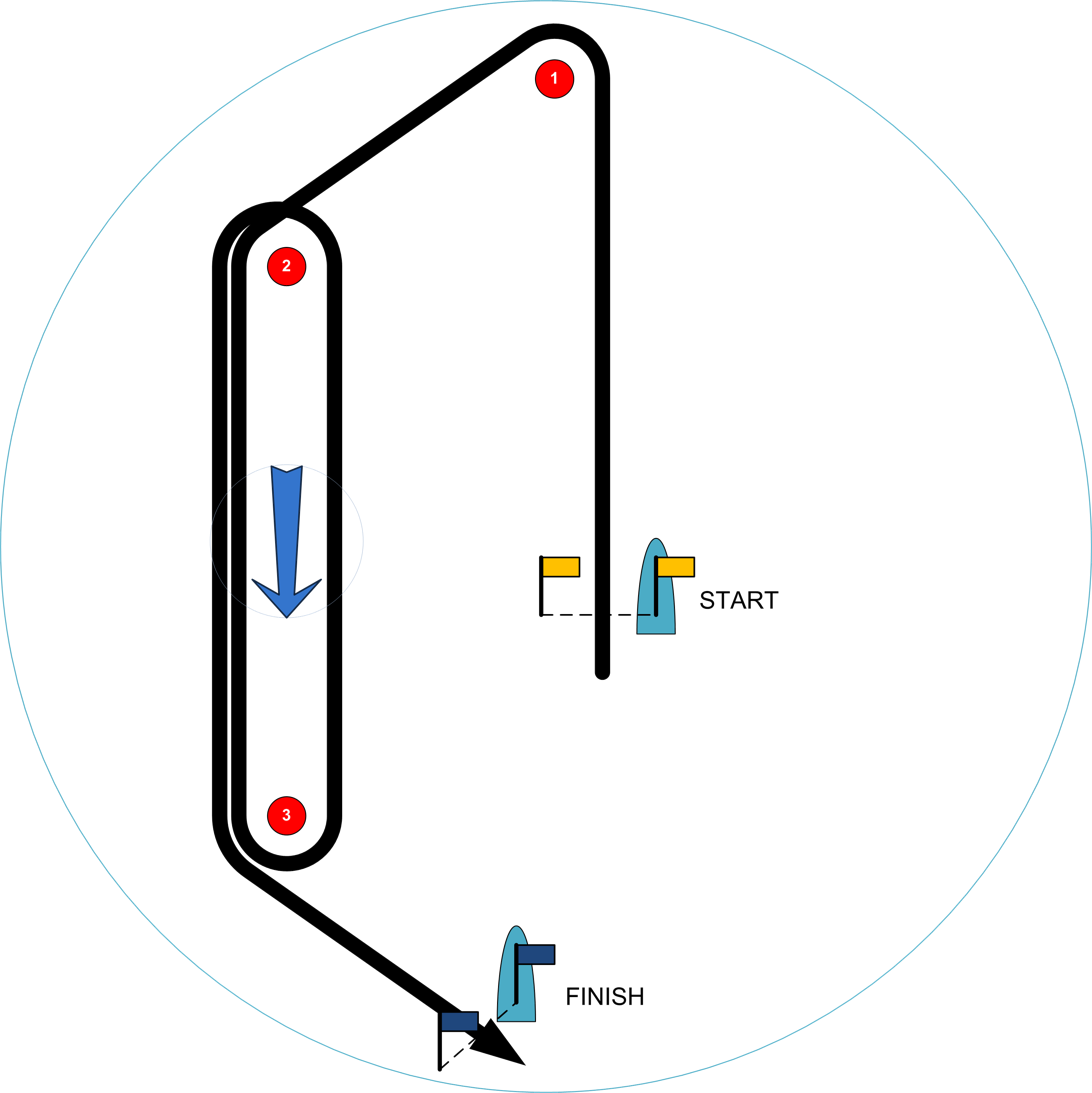
Olympic course ZO.
Fleetrace
.
S(Start) - 1 - 2 - 3 - - 2 - 3 - F(Finish reaching)

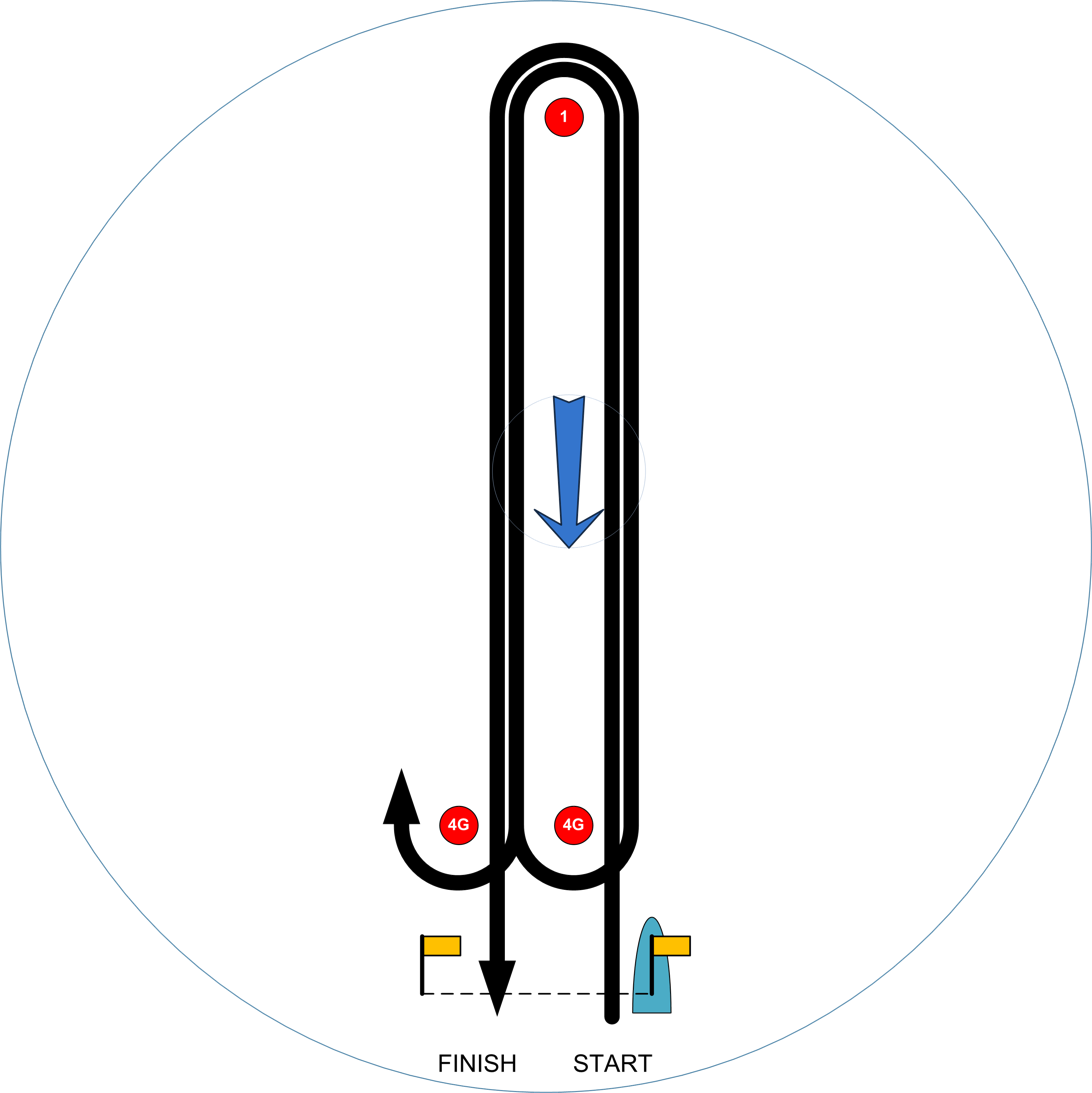
Olympic course WD.
Matchracerace
.
S(Start) - 1 - 4G - 1 - F(Finish downwind)

Date	Race	°C		Knot	Meter	Course	Course area
22 July 1996	I	30		7	0.4	ZO	Delta
23 July 1996	II	29		10	0.8	ZO	Delta
23 July 1996	III	29		13	0.8	ZO	Delta
26 July 1996	IV	27		7	0.5	ZO	Delta
26 July 1996	V	27		10	0.5	ZO	Delta
27 July 1996	VI	28		5	0.5	ZO	Delta
27 July 1996	VII	29		8	0.6	ZO	Delta
28 July 1996	VIII	29		6	0.7	ZO	Delta
29 July 1996	IX	29		11	0.6	ZO	Delta
29 July 1996	X	30		11	0.6	ZO	Delta
31 July 1996	QF	28		10-15	0.6	WD	Delta
1 August 1996	SF	28		7	0.5	WD	Delta
2 August 1996	SF	26		10	0.7	WD	Delta
2 August 1996	PF	28-25	-	5-20	0.6-0.4	WD	Delta
2 August 1996	F	27-28	-	10-6	0.6-0.4	WD	Delta
