= Bahrain at the 2008 Summer Olympics =

- IOC code: BRN
- NOC: Bahrain Olympic Committee

in Beijing
- Competitors: 15 in 3 sports
- Flag bearer: Rakia Al Gassra
- Medals: Gold 0 Silver 0 Bronze 0 Total 0

Summer Olympics appearances (overview)
- 1984; 1988; 1992; 1996; 2000; 2004; 2008; 2012; 2016; 2020; 2024; 2028

Bahrain competed at the 2008 Summer Olympics in Beijing, China. The country sent a total of 15 competitors to the Games, competing in athletics, swimming and shooting. This constituted Bahrain's largest Olympic delegation to date. Among the country's representatives was Maryam Yusuf Jamal, reigning world champion in the women's 1,500 metre run. Rakia Al Gassra was the country's flagbearer at the Games' opening ceremony. In athletics, Rashid Ramzi was originally awarded the gold medal in men's 1,500 meters (Bahrain's first Olympic medal) but it was later stripped due to a doping violation.

== Athletics ==
Men

Athlete	Event	Heat		Semifinal		Final	
Athlete	Event	Result	Rank	Result	Rank	Result	Rank
Belal Mansoor Ali	800 m	1:45.95	5 q	1:46.37	5	Did not advance	
Belal Mansoor Ali	1500 m	3:36.84	6 q	3:37.60	5 Q	3:35.23	7
Yusuf Saad Kamel	800 m	1:46.94	2 Q	1:44.95	3 q	1:44.95	5
Aadam Khamis	5000 m	13:44.76	9	—N/a		Did not advance	
Hasan Mahboob	5000 m	DNS		—N/a		Did not advance	
Hasan Mahboob	10000 m	—N/a				27:55.14	18
Rashid Ramzi	1500 m	3:32.89	1 Q	3:37.11	1 Q	~~3:32.94~~	DSQ*
Rashid Ramzi	5000 m	DNS		—N/a		Did not advance	
Al Mustafa Riyadh	Marathon	—N/a				DNF	
Nasar Sakar Saeed	Marathon	—N/a				2:20:24	37
Tareq Mubarak Taher	3000 m steeplechase	8:23.66	4 Q	—N/a		8:21.59	11
Abdulhak Zakaria	Marathon	—N/a				DNF	

* Rashid Ramzi was originally awarded the gold medal in men's 1,500 meters (Bahrain's first Olympic medal) but it was later stripped due to a doping violation.

Women

Athlete	Event	Heat		Quarterfinal		Semifinal		Final	
Athlete	Event	Result	Rank	Result	Rank	Result	Rank	Result	Rank
Rakia Al Gassra	200 m	22.81	1 Q	22.76	1 Q	22.72	6	Did not advance	
Nadia Ejjafini	Marathon	—N/a						DNS	
Maryam Yusuf Jamal	1500 m	4:05.14	1 Q	—N/a				4:02.71	5

Key

- Note–Ranks given for track events are within the athlete's heat only
- Q = Qualified for the next round
- q = Qualified for the next round as a fastest loser or, in field events, by position without achieving the qualifying target
- NR = National record
- N/A = Round not applicable for the event
- Bye = Athlete not required to compete in round

== Shooting ==
Salman Zaman was the country's only representative in shooting.

Men

Athlete	Event	Qualification		Final	
Athlete	Event	Points	Rank	Points	Rank
Salman Zaman	50 m rifle prone	588	37	Did not advance	

== Swimming ==
Bahrain was represented by two swimmers at the Beijing Games.

Men

Athlete	Event	Heat		Semifinal		Final	
Athlete	Event	Time	Rank	Time	Rank	Time	Rank
Omar Jasim	50 m freestyle	24.65	64	Did not advance			

Women

Athlete	Event	Heat		Semifinal		Final	
Athlete	Event	Time	Rank	Time	Rank	Time	Rank
Sameera Al Bitar	50 m freestyle	30.32	74	Did not advance			
