= Bahrain at the 2011 Asian Winter Games =

- IOC code: BRN
- NOC: Bahrain Olympic Committee

in Astana and Almaty
- Competitors: 17 in 1 sport
- Medals: Gold 0 Silver 0 Bronze 0 Total 0

Asian Winter Games appearances
- 2011; 2017; 2025; 2029

Bahrain will participate in the 2011 Asian Winter Games in Almaty and Astana, Kazakhstan from January 30, 2011 to February 6, 2011. This marks Bahrain's debut at a major winter sporting event.

== Ice hockey ==
Men

The Bahrain men's Ice hockey team will make its debut at an international competition. The team is in the premier division for these games. The team lost all six games and finished in 12th and last place.

Premier Division

Rank	Team	Pld	W	OW	OL	L	GF	GA	GD	Pts
6	Kyrgyzstan	6	6	0	0	0	95	23	+72	18
7	Thailand	6	5	0	0	1	70	22	+48	15
8	United Arab Emirates	6	4	0	0	2	48	27	+21	12
9	Mongolia	6	3	0	0	3	35	37	−2	9
10	Malaysia	6	2	0	0	4	46	59	−13	6
11	Athletes from Kuwait	6	1	0	0	5	41	40	+1	3
12	Bahrain	6	0	0	0	6	11	138	−127	0

All times are local (UTC+6).

January 28, 2011; 17:00	Malaysia	25 - 0 (4–0, 8–0, 13–0)	Bahrain	Kazakhstan Sports Palace (Arena 2)

January 29; 17:00	Bahrain	0 – 29 (0–11, 0–10, 0–8)	Thailand	Kazakhstan Sports Palace 2, Astana; Attendance: 200

http://info.astana-almaty2011.kz/en/Root.mvc/ViewPdf/IHM500A05_C74_3.1.pdf

Abdulla Al-Adhab
Goalies
Jason Cotsmire
Referee:
Keith Fong (CAN)

0–1	03:00 – Aarola (Thamwongsin)
0–2	03:52 – Neimwan (Chartsuwan)
0–3	05:20 – Jirachai (Tengsakul)
0–4	07:03 – Thongaram (Neimwan) (PP)
0–5	09:01 – Jirachai (Tengsakul)
0–6	09:45 – Pivekumt (Aarola) (PP2)
0–7	10:10 – Aarola (Pivekumt) (PP)
0–8	10:34 – Thammasit (Thongaram) (PP)
0–9	11:51 – Rattanachot (Ct. Supadilokluk, Chartsuwan) (PP)
0–10	12:20 – Rattanachot (Neimwan, Chartsuwan) (PP)
0–11	19:06 – Kullugin (Aarola, Pivekumt)
0–12	20:14 – Chartsuwan (Neimwan) (SH)
0–13	23:15 – Aarola (Pivekumt)
0–14	24:56 – Chartsuwan
0–15	27:26 – Thamwongsin (Pivekumt, Kullugin)
0–16	29:07 – Rattanachot (Chartsuwan) (PP)
0–17	30:18 – Tengsakul (Thammasit)
0–18	30:29 – Kasemsunt (Thammasit)
0–19	30:38 – Aarola (Thamwongsin)
0–20	31:12 – Aarola (Thamwongsin)
0–21	35:12 – Thamwongsin (Kullugin)
0–22	42:45 – Pivekumt (Harnnarujchai, Thamwongsin) (PP)
0–23	50:00 – Rattanachot (Ce. Supadilokluk)
0–24	50:14 – Chartsuwan (Rattanachot)
0–25	53:02 – Thamwongsin (Pivekumt, Aarola)
0–26	54:09 – Thammasit (Jittranont)
0–27	56:02 – Rattanachot (Neimwan)
0–28	58:11 – Aarola
0–29	59:21 – Chartsuwan (Ce. Supadilokluk, Neimwan)

39 min
Penalties
4 min
2
Shots
70

January 31; 13:30	United Arab Emirates	25 – 0 (9–0, 6–0, 10–0)	Bahrain	Kazakhstan Sports Palace 2, Astana; Attendance: 200

http://info.astana-almaty2011.kz/en/Root.mvc/ViewPdf/IHM500A07_C74_3.0.pdf

Ahmed Al-Dhaheri (out 33:45)
Khaled Al-Suwaidi (in 33:45)
Goalies
Abdulla Al-Adhab
Referee:
Kimikazu Koizumi (JPN)

J. Al-Dhaheri – 00:06	1–0
J. Al-Dhaheri (Al-Darmaki) – 01:04	2–0
Al-Nuaimi (Al-Jachi) (SH) – 07:35	3–0
Al-Mheiri (M. Al-Shamisi) (SH) – 07:48	4–0
Al. Al-Mazrouei (J. Al-Dhaheri, Al-Darmaki) – 08:55	5–0
M. Al-Shamisi (Al-Jachi) – 11:33	6–0
J. Al-Dhaheri (Al-Mheiri) (SH) – 15:39	7–0
Al-Darmaki (Al. Al-Mazrouei, J. Al-Dhaheri) – 17:44	8–0
Al-Mheiri (Al-Jachi, O. Al-Shamisi) (PP) – 19:13	9–0
Al-Nuaimi (F. Al-Suwaidi) – 22:18	10–0
M. Al-Mazrouei (Al-Nuaimi) – 29:02	11–0
Al-Baloushi (M. Al-Shamisi, Al-Sarour) – 30:55	12–0
Al-Sarour (M. Al-Shamisi) – 33:54	13–0
M. Al-Shamisi (Al-Baloushi, Al-Sarour) (PP) – 35:58	14–0
Al-Subousi – 37:21	15–0
Al-Baloushi (Al. Al-Mazrouei) – 42:24	16–0
Al-Nuaimi (M. Al-Shamisi) – 44:36	17–0
O. Al-Shamisi (J. Al-Dhaheri) – 47:54	18–0
Al. Al-Mazrouei (J. Al-Dhaheri) – 48:15	19–0
Al-Nuaimi – 48:52	20–0
Al-Nuaimi (O. Al-Shamisi, Al-Mheiri) – 50:07	21–0
Al-Darmaki (Bu-Debs, Al. Al-Mazrouei) – 51:59	22–0
Al-Nuaimi (J. Al-Dhaheri) – 53:43	23–0
O. Al-Shamisi (SH) – 59:02	24–0
J. Al-Dhaheri (Al-Nuaimi) – 59:49	25–0

8 min
Penalties
16 min
66
Shots
3

February 1; 17:00	Bahrain	1 – 21 (1–4, 0–8, 0–9)	Mongolia	Kazakhstan Sports Palace 2, Astana; Attendance: 100

http://info.astana-almaty2011.kz/en/Root.mvc/ViewPdf/IHM500A11_C74_3.0.pdf

Abdulla Al-Adhab
Goalies
Bazarvaani Baatarkhuu (out 30:40)
Batsukh Battur (in 30:40)
Referee:
Nikita Zalipyatskikh (KAZ)

	0–1	03:26 – Od-Erdene (SH)
	0–2	07:00 – Chuluunzorig (Munkhzaya, Purev-Ochir)
	0–3	11:07 – Mishigsuren (Altanbayar) (PP)
	0–4	13:33 – Purev-Ochir (Munkhzaya)
Fakhroo (PP2) – 17:34	1–4
	1–5	21:19 – Batzaya (Mishigsuren)
	1–6	22:02 – Bayarjargal (Zolboo, Bolor-Erdene)
	1–7	24:01 – Tserenbaljir (Batzaya, Mishigsuren) (PP)
	1–8	24:14 – Mishigsuren (Batzaya, Tserenbaljir)
	1–9	24:34 – Bayarjargal (Zolboo, Bolor-Erdene)
	1–10	28:22 – Mishigsuren (Batzaya) (PP)
	1–11	31:24 – Purev-Ochir
	1–12	35:56 – Munkhzaya
	1–13	40:40 – Mishigsuren (Batzaya, Tserenbaljir) (PP)
	1–14	42:17 – Bolor-Erdene (Erkhbayar) (PP)
	1–15	43:34 – Batzaya (Od-Erdene)
	1–16	45:29 – Zolboo (Erkhbayar)
	1–17	51:21 – Tserenbaljir (Batzaya)
	1–18	53:44 – Zolboo (SH)
	1–19	54:47 – Mishigsuren (Batzaya) (PP)
	1–20	58:39 – Od-Erdene
	1–21	59:40 – Batzaya

18 min
Penalties
12 min
11
Shots
68

February 2; 13:30	Bahrain	10 – 15 (2–6, 6–4, 2–5)	Kyrgyzstan	Kazakhstan Sports Palace 2, Astana; Attendance: 150

http://info.astana-almaty2011.kz/en/Root.mvc/ViewPdf/IHM500A13_C74_3.0.pdf

Abdulla Al-Adhab (out 51:15)
Mohamed Al-Doy (in 51:15)
Goalies
Sergey Ossintsev (out 12:37)
Zhirgalbek Bakirov (in 12:37)
Referee:
Choi Yoon-Young (KOR)

	0–1	02:11 – Kolobov (Kryukov)
	0–2	03:54 – Askarbekov (Sazonov)
	0–3	05:55 – Toktaliev (Zhuravlyov, Kabanov)
	0–4	11:03 – Toktaliev
	0–5	11:17 – Sheishenaliev (Shiderinov, Fillippov)
	0–6	11:37 – Sheishenaliev (Shiderinov, Kolobov)
Al-Mutlaq (Hegazi, Ahmed) – 17:41	1–6
Al-Mushiqeri (Turki, Al-Thawadi) – 19:26	2–6
Ahmed (Hegazi) – 23:05	3–6
Baqer (Al-Jawder) – 24:07	4–6
Ismaeel – 24:24	5–6
Turki – 25:41	6–6
	6–7	26:22 – Kolobov (Kryukov)
Al-Jawder (Ismaeel) – 27:20	7–7
	7–8	28:41 – Fitisenko
	7–9	30:24 – Sheishenaliev (Kryukov, Kolobov)
Ahmed – 33:55	8–9
	8–10	34:04 – Tokoev
	8–11	41:21 – Toktaliev (Zhuravlyov, Kabanov)
	8–12	42:00 – Fillippov (Kryukov)
	8–13	57:47 – Toktaliev (Zhuravlyov, Kabanov)
	8–14	58:52 – Askarbekov (Kryukov, Kolobov)
	8–15	59:07 – Esen Uulu (Zhuravlyov)
Al-Mushiqeri (Al-Thawadi) (EN) – 59:27	9–15
Ahmed (EN) – 59:44	10–15

0 min
Penalties
2 min
24
Shots
42

February 5; 13:30	Athletes from Kuwait	23 – 0 (6–0, 7–0, 10–0)	Bahrain	Kazakhstan Sports Palace 2, Astana; Attendance: 300

http://info.astana-almaty2011.kz/en/Root.mvc/ViewPdf/IHM500A19_C74_3.0.pdf

Jasem Al-Sarraf (out 20:00)
Jasem Dashti (in 20:00)
Goalies
Abdulla Al-Adhab
Referee:
Keith Fong (CAN)

A. Al-Ajmi (Me. Al-Ajmi) – 03:00	1–0
A. Al-Ajmi (A. Al-Maragi, Al-Awadhi) – 05:00	2–0
Al-Henaidi (Atallah, S. Al-Ajmi) – 08:04	3–0
Me. Al-Ajmi (A. Al-Maragi, A. Al-Ajmi) – 16:15	4–0
M. Al-Maragi (S. Al-Ajmi) – 17:55	5–0
Me. Al-Ajmi – 18:10	6–0
Shetail (Me. Al-Ajmi) – 23:14	7–0
Me. Al-Ajmi (S. Al-Ajmi) (PP2) – 25:13	8–0
S. Al-Ajmi (M. Al-Maragi, Y. Al-Kandari) (PP) – 30:59	9–0
A. Al-Maragi (Me. Al-Ajmi, Shetail) – 32:05	10–0
A. Al-Maragi (Me. Al-Ajmi) (SH) – 32:55	11–0
S. Al-Ajmi (Y. Al-Kandari) – 39:01	12–0
Me. Al-Ajmi (A. Al-Maragi, Shetail) – 39:22	13–0
Shetail (Me. Al-Ajmi) (PP) – 40:29	14–0
Y. Al-Kandari (S. Al-Ajmi) – 43:16	15–0
Me. Al-Ajmi (PP) – 46:20	16–0
S. Al-Ajmi (Al-Awadhi, Y. Al-Kandari) – 48:48	17–0
A. Al-Maragi (PP) – 49:27	18–0
A. Al-Maragi (Me. Al-Ajmi) (PP) – 50:15	19–0
Me. Al-Ajmi (Shetail) – 51:08	20–0
Me. Al-Ajmi (PP) – 53:34	21–0
Y. Al-Kandari (Me. Al-Ajmi, S. Al-Ajmi) – 56:37	22–0
A. Al-Maragi (Shetail) (SH) – 57:23	23–0

14 min
Penalties
20 min
103
Shots
1
