= Bahrain at the 1984 Summer Olympics =

- IOC code: BRN
- NOC: Bahrain Olympic Committee

in Los Angeles
- Competitors: 10 (all men) in 4 sports
- Flag bearer: Youssef Mubarak
- Medals: Gold 0 Silver 0 Bronze 0 Total 0

Summer Olympics appearances (overview)
- 1984; 1988; 1992; 1996; 2000; 2004; 2008; 2012; 2016; 2020; 2024

Bahrain competed in the Olympic Games for the first time at the 1984 Summer Olympics in Los Angeles, United States. Ten competitors, all men, took part in eight events in four sports.

== Athletics ==
Key

- Note–Ranks given for track events are within the athlete's heat only

Men
Track & road events

Athlete	Event	Heat		Semifinal		Final	
Athlete	Event	Result	Rank	Result	Rank	Result	Rank
Ahmed Hamada Jassim	400 m hurdles	50.62	4	Did not advance			

== Modern pentathlon ==
Three male pentathletes represented Bahrain in 1984.

Individual

- Saleh Sultan Faraj
- Abdul Rahman Jassim
- Nabeel Saleh Mubarak

Team

- Saleh Sultan Faraj
- Abdul Rahman Jassim
- Nabeel Saleh Mubarak

== Swimming ==
Men's 100m Freestyle

- Hamad Bader
  - Heat — 58.16 (→ did not advance, 61st place)

Men's 100m Butterfly

- Esa Fadel
  - Heat — 1:13.27 (→ did not advance, 52nd place)
