= Naseem Bano (artist) =

Indian craftswoman

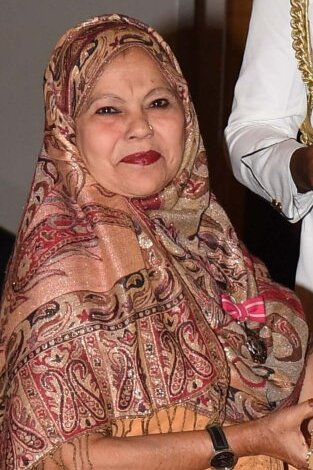
- Bano in 2024
- Born: 1 December 1962 (age 63); Lucknow, Uttar Pradesh, India
- Education: Lucknow University
- Occupations: Textile artist, craftswoman
- Known for: Traditional Anokhi Chikankari
- Father: Hassan Mirza
- Relatives: Rehana Begum (sister)
- Awards: Padma Shri

Naseem Bano (born 1 December 1962) is an Indian craftswoman of Anokhi Chikankari, a traditional embroidery style from Lucknow. The Anokhi Chikankari was developed by her father, Hassan Mirza, a national award recipient. She received the Padma Shri award in the field of art in 2024 from the president of India.

== Early life and education ==
Bano was born on 1 December 1962 in Lucknow. She obtained her graduation degree from the University of Lucknow in 1996. She learned the art of embroidery from her father Hassan Mirza a national awardee.
