= Bahrain at the 2004 Summer Olympics =

- IOC code: BRN
- NOC: Bahrain Olympic Committee

in Athens
- Competitors: 10 in 4 sports
- Flag bearer: Ahmed Hamada Jassim
- Medals: Gold 0 Silver 0 Bronze 0 Total 0

Summer Olympics appearances (overview)
- 1984; 1988; 1992; 1996; 2000; 2004; 2008; 2012; 2016; 2020; 2024

Bahrain competed at the 2004 Summer Olympics in Athens, Greece, from 13 to 29 August 2004.

== Athletics ==
Bahraini athletes have so far achieved qualifying standards in the following athletics events (up to a maximum of 3 athletes in each event at the 'A' Standard, and 1 at the 'B' Standard).

Men

Athlete	Event	Heat		Semifinal		Final	
Athlete	Event	Result	Rank	Result	Rank	Result	Rank
Yusuf Saad Kamel	800 m	1:46.94	3	Did not advance			
Rashid Ramzi	1500 m	3:37.93	4 Q	3:44.60	11	Did not advance	
Al Mustafa Riyadh	Marathon	—				DNF	
Mohammed Abdelhak Zakaria	5000 m	13:42.04	15	—		Did not advance	

Women

Athlete	Event	Heat		Quarterfinal		Semifinal		Final	
Athlete	Event	Result	Rank	Result	Rank	Result	Rank	Result	Rank
Rakia Al Gassra	100 m	11.49	5	Did not advance					
Nadia Ejjafini	Marathon	—						DNF	

Key

- Note–Ranks given for track events are within the athlete's heat only
- Q = Qualified for the next round
- q = Qualified for the next round as a fastest loser or, in field events, by position without achieving the qualifying target
- NR = National record
- N/A = Round not applicable for the event
- Bye = Athlete not required to compete in round

== Sailing ==
Bahraini sailors have qualified one boat for each of the following events.

Open

Athlete	Event	Race											Net points	Final rank
Athlete	Event	1	2	3	4	5	6	7	8	9	10	M*	Net points	Final rank
Sami Kooheji	Laser	41	39	35	32	~~OCS~~	38	42	41	39	36	41	384	42

M = Medal race; OCS = On course side of the starting line; DSQ = Disqualified; DNF = Did not finish; DNS= Did not start; RDG = Redress given

== Shooting ==
Men

Athlete	Event	Qualification		Final	
Athlete	Event	Points	Rank	Points	Rank
Khalid Mohamed	10 m air pistol	553	45	Did not advance	

== Swimming ==
Men

Athlete	Event	Heat		Semifinal		Final	
Athlete	Event	Time	Rank	Time	Rank	Time	Rank
Hesham Shehab	100 m freestyle	57.94	66	Did not advance			

Women

Athlete	Event	Heat		Semifinal		Final	
Athlete	Event	Time	Rank	Time	Rank	Time	Rank
Sameera Al Bitar	50 m freestyle	31.00	=63	Did not advance			

== See also ==
- Bahrain at the 2002 Asian Games
- Bahrain at the 2004 Summer Paralympics
