= Matt Hayes (sailor) =

Olympic sailor from Australia

Personal information
- Nationality: Australia
- Born: 4 February 1964 Sydney
- Height: 1.70 m (5.6 ft)

Sport

Sailing career
- Class: Soling
- Club: Cruising Yacht Club of Australia
- Updated on 29 February 2020

Matt Hayes (born: 4 February 1964 Sydney) is a sailor from Australia, who represented his country at the 1996 Summer Olympics in Savannah, United States in Barcelona, Spain as helmsman in the Soling. With crew members Steve Jarvin and Stephen McConaghy they took the 12th place.

Hayes established Sydney By Sail in 1995. The company supplies charter yachts and is based at Darling Harbour, New South Wales.
