= Stefanos Chandakas =

Greek sailor

Stefanos Chandakas (Greek: Στέφανος Χανδακας; born 27 March 1972) is a Greek sailor, who represented his country at the 1996 Summer Olympics in Atlanta. He was born in Athens. Chandakas took 18th place in Soling class with crew member Panagiotis Alevras and helmsman Stavros Alevras.
