= Bruce Savage (sailor) =

Olympic sailor from South Africa

Personal information
- Full name: Bruce Charles Savage
- Nationality: South Africa
- Born: 22 August 1962 Johannesburg
- Height: 1.83 m (6.0 ft)

Sailing career
- Sport: Sailing
- Club: Point Yacht Club
- Class: Soling
- Updated on 29 February 2020

Bruce Savage (born 22 August 1962, in Johannesburg) is a sailor from South Africa, who represented his country at the 1992 Summer Olympics in Barcelona, Spain as helmsman in the Soling. With crew members Giles Stanley and Rick Mayhew they took the 14th place. Bruce with crew members Rick Mayhew and Clynton Lehman took 11th place during the 1996 Summer Olympics in Savannah, United States as helmsman in the Soling.
