= Steve Jarvin =

Olympic sailor from Australia

Seve Jarvin
Personal information
- Nationality: Australia
- Born: 27 March 1960 (age 65) Sydney
- Height: 1.85 m (6.1 ft)

Sport

Sailing career
- Class: Soling
- Club: Cruising Yacht Club of Australia
- Updated on 29 February 2020

Seve Jarvin (born 27 March 1960) is a sailor from Sydney, Australia. who represented his country at the 1996 Summer Olympics in Savannah, United States as crew member in the Soling. With helmsman Matt Hayes and fellow crew member Stephen McConaghy they took the 12th place.
