= Gerhard Potma =

Dutch sailor (1967–2006)

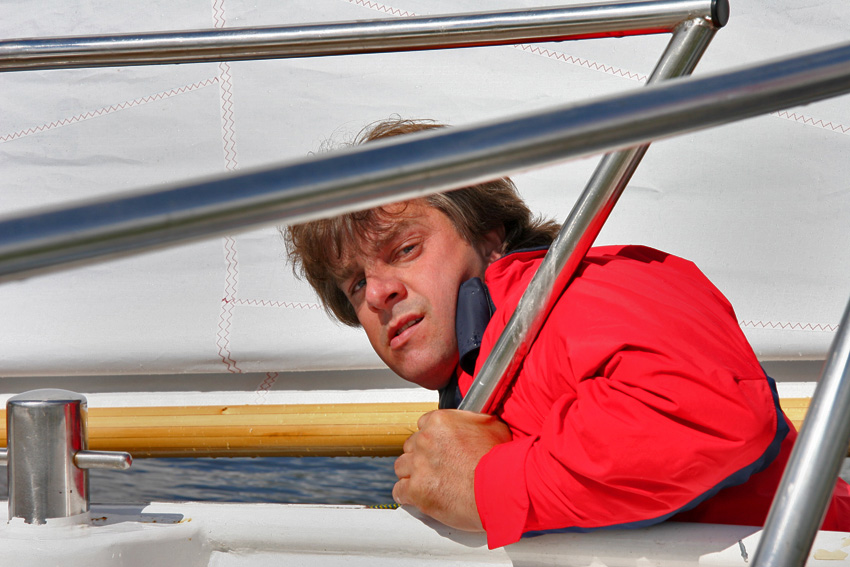
- Potma in May 2005

Personal information
- Full name: Gerhardus Johannes Cornelis Potma
- Nationality: Dutch
- Born: 29 August 1967 Sneek, Friesland, Netherlands
- Died: 31 March 2006 (aged 38) Sneek, Friesland, Netherlands
- Height: 1.84 m (6 ft 0 in)

Sailing career
- Sport: Sailing
- Class(es): Flying Dutchman; Soling
Competition record
Representing Netherlands
Olympic Games
1992 Barcelona	Flying Dutchman
1996 Savannah	Soling
- Updated on 20 February 2014

Gerhard Potma (29 August 1967, in Sneek – 31 March 2006, in Sneek) was a sailor from the Netherlands, who represented his country at the 1992 Summer Olympics in Barcelona. Potma as crew in the Dutch Flying Dutchman with his brother, Willem Potma, as helmsman took the 18th place. In 1996 Potma returned to the Olympics in Savannah. Again with his brother as helmsman and Frank Hettinga as crew. Potma took 15th place in the Soling.
