= Garrett Connolly =

Irish Olympic sailor (born 1959)

Personal information
- Nationality: Ireland
- Born: 4 July 1959 (age 66) Dublin

Sport

Sailing career
- Class: Soling
- Club: Howth Yacht Club
- Updated on 1 March 2020

Garrett Connolly (born 4 July 1959) is a sailor from Dublin, Ireland. who represented his country at the 1996 Summer Olympics in Savannah, United States as crew member in the Soling. With helmsman Marshall King and fellow crew member Dan O'Grady they took the 16th place.

He is the loving father of two beautiful children with another son living in America.
