= Giles Stanley =

Olympic sailor from South Africa

Personal information
- Full name: Giles Canham Stanley
- Nationality: South Africa
- Born: 26 January 1965 (age 61)

Sport

Sailing career
- Class: Soling
- Updated on 29 February 2020

Giles Stanley (born 26 January 1965) is a sailor from South Africa. who represented his country at the 1992 Summer Olympics in Barcelona, Spain as crew member in the Soling. With helmsman Bruce Savage and fellow crew member Rick Mayhew they took the 14th place.
