= Stephen McConaghy =

Olympic sailor from Australia

Personal information
- Nationality: Australia
- Born: 15 January 1968 (age 58) Sydney, Australia
- Height: 1.80 m (5 ft 11 in)

Sailing career
- Sport: Sailing
- Club: Royal Prince Alfred Yacht Club
- Class: Soling
- Updated on 29 February 2020

Stephen McConaghy (born 15 January 1968) is a sailor from Sydney, Australia. who represented his country at the 1996 Summer Olympics in Savannah, United States as crew member in the Soling. With helmsman Matt Hayes and fellow crew member Steve Jarvin they took the 12th place.
