= Bahrain at the 2012 Summer Olympics =

- IOC code: BRN
- NOC: Bahrain Olympic Committee

in London
- Competitors: 12 in 3 sports
- Flag bearer: Azza Al Qasmi
- Medals Ranked 79th: Gold 1 Silver 0 Bronze 0 Total 1

Summer Olympics appearances (overview)
- 1984; 1988; 1992; 1996; 2000; 2004; 2008; 2012; 2016; 2020; 2024

Bahrain competed at the 2012 Summer Olympics in London, United Kingdom from 27 July to 12 August 2012. This nation marked its eighth appearance in the Summer Olympics, but there were concerns about the nation's participation to the games due to its recent political uprising.

Bahrain Olympic Committee selected a team of 12 athletes to the Games, 8 women and 4 men, to compete only in athletics, shooting, and swimming. For the first time in its history, Bahrain was represented by more female than male athletes at an Olympic event, which did not happen before for an Arab gold nation. Most of them, however, were naturalized athletes (being born from a foreign country) in order to represent the nation in sports.

Bahrain left London with its first ever Olympic medal, won by middle-distance runner Maryam Yusuf Jamal in the women's 1500 metres.

== Medalists ==
Medal	Name	Sport	Event	Date
Gold	Maryam Yusuf Jamal	Athletics	Women's 1500 m	10 August

IOC reallocated the medals in Women's 1500 metres event due to the disqualification of the gold and silver medallists Aslı Çakır Alptekin and Gamze Bulut, and bronze medalist Maryam Yusuf Jamal advanced to the gold.

== Athletics ==
Qualifying standards in the athletics events include fielding up to a maximum of 3 athletes in each event at the 'A' Standard, and 1 at the 'B' Standard

Key

- Note – Ranks given for track events are within the athlete's heat only
- Q = Qualified for the next round
- q = Qualified for the next round as a fastest loser or, in field events, by position without achieving the qualifying target
- NR = National record
- N/A = Round not applicable for the event
- Bye = Athlete not required to compete in round

Men

Athlete	Event	Heat		Semifinal		Final	
Athlete	Event	Result	Rank	Result	Rank	Result	Rank
Belal Mansoor Ali	1500 m	3:38.69	10 q	3:35.40	7 q	3:37.98	10
Bilisuma Shugi	5000 m	13:31.84	25	—		Did not advance	
Ali Hasan Mahboob	10000 m	—				DNF	

Women

Athlete	Event	Heat		Semifinal		Final	
Athlete	Event	Result	Rank	Result	Rank	Result	Rank
Genzeb Shumi Regasa	800 m	2:07.77	3 Q	2:01.76	6	Did not advance	
Genzeb Shumi Regasa	1500 m	4:14.02	8	Did not advance			
Mimi Belete	1500 m	4:07.01	5 Q	4:05.91	8	Did not advance	
Maryam Yusuf Jamal	1500 m	4:05.39	3 Q	4:02.18	4 Q	4:10.74	1st place, gold medalist(s)
Lishan Dula	Marathon	—				2:36:20	62
Tejitu Daba	5000 m	15:05.59	6 q	—		15:21.34	12
Shitaye Eshete	5000 m	15:05.48	8 q	—		15:19.13	10
Shitaye Eshete	10000 m	—				30:47.25	6

== Shooting ==
Bahrain has one female shooter to compete in the Olympics.

Women

Athlete	Event	Qualification		Final	
Athlete	Event	Points	Rank	Points	Rank
Azza Al Qasmi	50 m rifle 3 positions	576	33	Did not advance	

== Swimming ==
Bahrain has two athletes participating in the swimming events.

Men

Athlete	Event	Heat		Semifinal		Final	
Athlete	Event	Time	Rank	Time	Rank	Time	Rank
Khalid Alibaba	100 m butterfly	1:04.05	43	Did not advance			

Women

Athlete	Event	Heat		Semifinal		Final	
Athlete	Event	Time	Rank	Time	Rank	Time	Rank
Sara Al Flaij	50 m freestyle	33.81	68	Did not advance			
