= Bahrain at the 2024 Summer Olympics =

- IOC code: BRN
- NOC: Bahrain Olympic Committee

in Paris, France 26 July 2024 – 11 August 2024
- Competitors: 14 (6 men and 8 women) in 5 sports
- Flag bearers (opening): Saud Ghali & Amani Al-Obaidli
- Flag bearer (closing): Akhmed Tazhudinov
- Medals Ranked 33rd: Gold 2 Silver 1 Bronze 1 Total 4

Summer Olympics appearances (overview)
- 1984; 1988; 1992; 1996; 2000; 2004; 2008; 2012; 2016; 2020; 2024

Bahrain competed at the 2024 Summer Olympics in Paris from 26 July to 11 August 2024. It was the nation's eleventh consecutive appearance at the Summer Olympics.

== Medalists ==
Medal	Name	Sport	Event	Date
Gold	Winfred Yavi	Athletics	Women's 3000 m steeplechase	6 August
Gold	Akhmed Tazhudinov	Wrestling	Men's −97 kg	11 August
Silver	Salwa Eid Naser	Athletics	Women's 400 m	9 August
(bronze) Bronze	Gor Minasyan	Weightlifting	Men's +102 kg	10 August

== Competitors ==
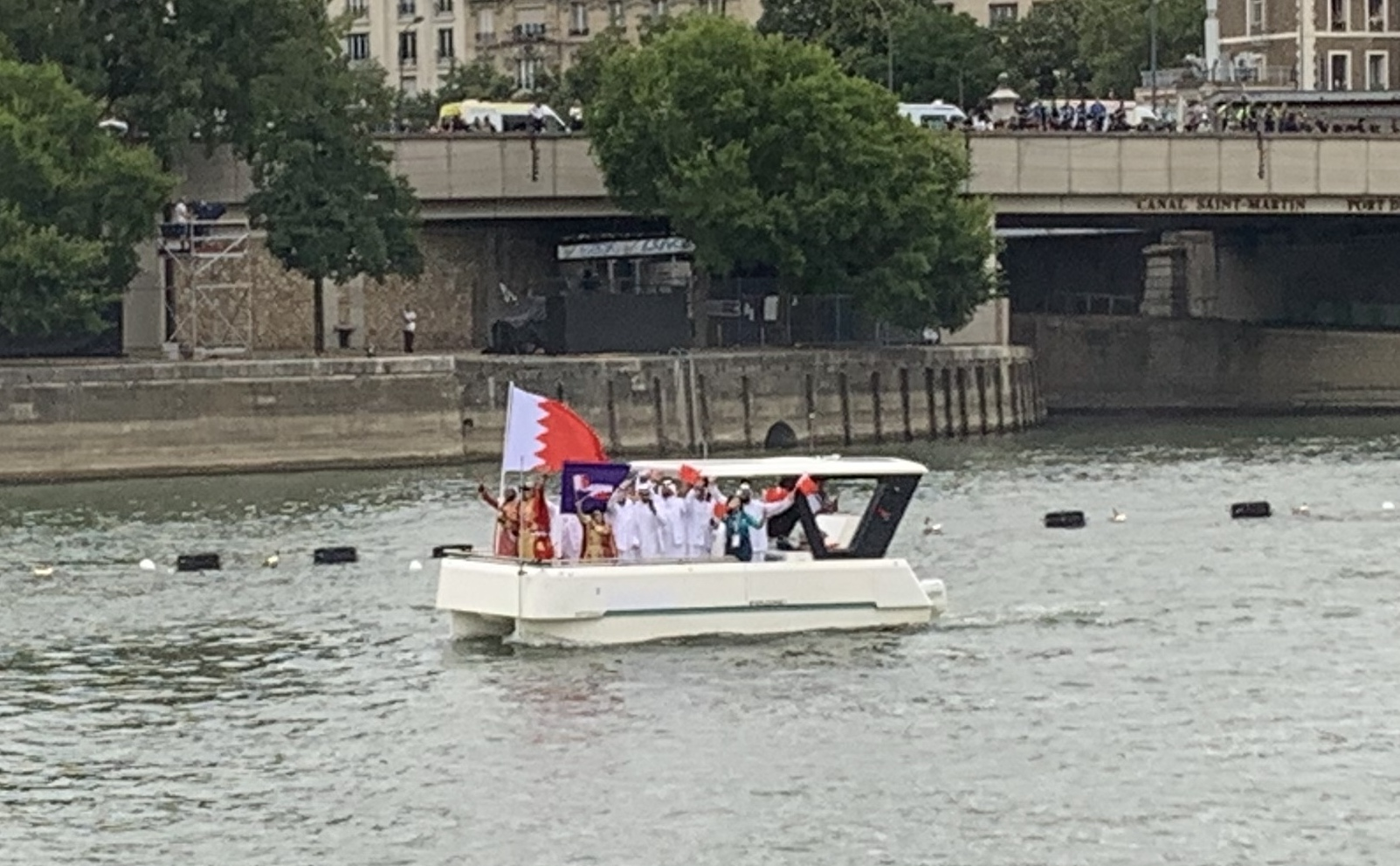
Bahrain at the Parade of Nations.

The following is the list of number of competitors in the Games.

Sport	Men	Women	Total
Athletics	1	7	8
Judo	1	0	1
Swimming	1	1	2
Weightlifting	2	0	2
Wrestling	1	0	1
Total	6	8	14

== Athletics ==
Bahraini track and field athletes achieved the entry standards for Paris 2024, either by passing the direct qualifying mark (or time for track and road races) or by world ranking, in the following events (a maximum of 3 athletes each):

Key

- Note–Ranks given for track events are within the athlete's heat only
- Q = Qualified for the next round
- q = Qualified for the next round as a fastest loser or, in field events, by position without achieving the qualifying target
- R = Qualified for the repechage round
- NR = National record
- N/A = Round not applicable for the event
- Bye = Athlete not required to compete in round

Track and road events
Men

Athlete	Event	Preliminary		Heat		Repechage		Semifinal		Final	
Athlete	Event	Time	Rank	Time	Rank	Time	Rank	Time	Rank	Time	Rank
Birhanu Balew	5000 m	—		13:53.11	10	—				Did not advance	
Birhanu Balew	10,000 m	—								27:30.94	17

Women

Athlete	Event	Preliminary		Heat		Repechage		Semifinal		Final	
Athlete	Event	Time	Rank	Time	Rank	Time	Rank	Time	Rank	Time	Rank
Salwa Eid Naser	400 m	—		49.91	1 Q	Bye		49.08	1 Q	48.53 SB	2nd place, silver medalist(s)
Kemi Adekoya	400 m hurdles	—		DNS		Did not advance					
Nelly Jepkosgei	800 m	—		2:00.63	5 R	2:01.12	5	Did not advance			
Winfred Yavi	3000 m steeplechase	—		9:15.11	1 Q	—				8:52.76 OR	1st place, gold medalist(s)
Eunice Chumba	Marathon	—								2:26:10	10
Tigist Gashaw	Marathon	—								2:30:53	34
Rose Chelimo	Marathon	—								2:32:08	43

== Judo ==
For the first time, Bahrain qualified one judoka for the following weight class at the Games. Askerbii Gerbekov (men's half-middleweight) got qualified via continental quota based on Olympic point rankings.

Athlete	Event	Round of 64	Round of 32	Round of 16	Quarterfinals	Semifinals	Repechage	Final / BM	
Athlete	Event	Opposition Result	Opposition Result	Opposition Result	Opposition Result	Opposition Result	Opposition Result	Opposition Result	Rank
Askerbii Gerbekov	Men's –81 kg	Bye	Albayrak (TUR); L 00–10	Did not advance					17

== Swimming ==
Bahrain sent two swimmers to compete at the 2024 Paris Olympics.

Athlete	Event	Heat		Semifinal		Final	
Athlete	Event	Time	Rank	Time	Rank	Time	Rank
Saud Ghali	Men's 200 m breaststroke	2:22.51	25	Did not advance			
Amani Al-Obaidli	Women's 100 m backstroke	1:04.27	31	Did not advance			

== Weightlifting ==
For the first time, Bahrain entered two weightlifters into the Olympic competition. Lesman Paredes (men's 102 kg) and Gor Minasyan (men's +102 kg) secured one of the top ten slots in their respective weight divisions based on the IWF Olympic Qualification Rankings.

Athlete	Event	Snatch		Clean & Jerk		Total	Rank
Athlete	Event	Result	Rank	Result	Rank	Total	Rank
Lesman Paredes	Men's −102 kg	181	5	211	6	392	6
Gor Minasyan	Men's +102 kg	216	1	245	3	461	3rd place, bronze medalist(s)

== Wrestling ==
For the first time since 2016, Bahrain qualified one wrestlers for each of the following classes into the Olympic competition. Akhmed Tazhudinov qualified for the games by virtue of top five results through the 2023 World Championships in Belgrade, Serbia.

Key:

- VT (ranking points: 5–0 or 0–5) – Victory by fall.
- VB (ranking points: 5–0 or 0–5) – Victory by injury (VF for forfeit, VA for withdrawal or disqualification)
- PP (ranking points: 3–1 or 1–3) – Decision by points – the loser with technical points.
- PO (ranking points: 3–0 or 0–3) – Decision by points – the loser without technical points.
- ST (ranking points: 4–0 or 0–4) – Great superiority – the loser without technical points and a margin of victory of at least 8 (Greco-Roman) or 10 (freestyle) points.
- SP (ranking points: 4–1 or 1–4) – Technical superiority – the loser with technical points and a margin of victory of at least 8 (Greco-Roman) or 10 (freestyle) points.

Freestyle

Athlete	Event	Round of 16	Quarterfinal	Semifinal	Repechage	Final / BM	
Athlete	Event	Opposition Result	Opposition Result	Opposition Result	Opposition Result	Opposition Result	Rank
Akhmed Tazhudinov	Men's −97 kg	Azarpira (IRI); W 4–3	Yergali (KAZ); W 14–2	Snyder (USA); W 6–4	Bye	Matcharashvili (GEO); W 2–0	1st place, gold medalist(s)
