= Frank Hettinga =

Olympic sailor

Personal information
- Full name: Frank Alexander Hettinga
- Nationality: Dutch
- Born: 26 November 1971 (age 54) Sneek
- Height: 1.99 m (6.5 ft)

Sport

Sailing career
- Class: Soling
Competition record
Representing Netherlands
Olympic Games
1996 Savannah	Soling
- Updated on 19 February 2014

Frank Alexander Hettinga (born 26 November 1971, in Sneek) is a sailor from the Netherlands, who represented his country at the 1996 Summer Olympics in Savannah. Hettinga as crew in the Dutch Soling with Willem Potma as helmsman and Gerhard Potma as fellow crew Hettinga took 1st place.

== Professional life ==
- Owner: Easysup Supstore (2013 – Present)
- Owner: Hettinga Jacht Service (2007 – Present)
- Director: Hettinga Jacht-Service (2007 – Present)
- Director and owner: Hettinga wajer jachtbouw heeg (1998–2007)
- Project manager: Royal Deck (2008–2011)
- Production coordinator: de Vries Makkum (2010–2013)
