= Ahmed Hamada =

Bahraini hurdler (born 1961)

Personal information
- Nationality: Bahraini
- Born: 18 September 1961 (age 64)
- Height: 183 cm (6 ft 0 in)
- Weight: 70 kg (154 lb)

Sport
- Sport: Athletics
- Event: hurdles
Medal record
Men's athletics
Representing Bahrain
Asian Games
Gold medal – first place	1986 Seoul	400 m hurdles
Bronze medal – third place	1982 New Delhi	400 m hurdles
Asian Championships
Gold medal – first place	1983 Kuwait City	400 m hurdles
Gold medal – first place	1985 Jakarta	400 m hurdles
Bronze medal – third place	1983 Kuwait City	110 m hurdles
Arab Games
Gold medal – first place	1985 Casablanca	400 m hurdles
Gold medal – first place	1985 Casablanca	110 m hurdles
Arab Championships
Gold medal – first place	1981 Tunis	400 m hurdles
Gold medal – first place	1983 Amman	400 m hurdles
Gold medal – first place	1983 Amman	110 m hurdles

Ahmed Hamada Jassim (Arabic: أحمد حمادة جاسم; born 18 September 1961) is a Bahraini former hurdler. He won Bahrain's first Asian Games medal and Asian Games gold medal, doing so in the men's 400 metres hurdles at the 1982 Asian Games and 1986 Asian Games respectively. His other include him being a three-time Arab Champion, two-time Arab Games champion, two-time Asian Champion, and AAA Champion.

Jassim was selected to be part of the first Bahraini delegation at the Summer Olympics, being part of the team at the 1984 Summer Olympics. He also competed at the 1988 Summer Olympics and was designated as the flag bearer for the nation during the opening ceremony. After his career, he was again designated the flag bearer, doing so at the 2004 Summer Olympics.

== Biography ==
Ahmed Hamada Jassim was born on 18 September 1961. He first competed at the 1979 Arab Athletics Championships in Baghdad, Iraq. At the subsequent edition of the championships in Tunis, Tunisia, he had won the gold medal in the men's 400 metres hurdles.

Jassim won Bahrain's first Asian Games medal after he had won the bronze medal in the men's 400 metres hurdles in a time of 50.99 seconds at the 1982 Asian Games in New Delhi, India. The following year, he had competed at the 1983 World Championships in Athletics though did not medal and had won a bronze medal in the event at the 1983 AAA Championships. At the 1983 Asian Athletics Championships in Kuwait City, he won the gold medal in the men's 400 metres hurdles and a bronze in the men's 110 metres hurdles. He won two gold medals in the same events at the 1983 Arab Athletics Championships in Amman, Jordan.

He was part of the first Bahraini Olympic team, where the nation debuted at the 1984 Summer Olympics in Los Angeles. He competed in the men's 400 metres hurdles' quarterfinals on 3 August, where he set a time of 51.06 and placed fourth in his round, not advancing further. He then competed at the first edition of the World Athletics Indoor Championships, competing in the men's 400 metres. He ran in a time of 48.80 seconds in the preliminaries and set a new national record in the event, though he did not advance further. In the same year, he had won the gold medal in the men's 400 metres at the 1985 Asian Athletics Championships, 1985 AAA Championships, and 1985 Arab Games, winning another gold in the men's 110 metres hurdles at the latter.

At the 1986 Asian Games in Seoul, South Korea, Jassim won the nation's first Asian Games gold medal, doing so in the event. He then competed at the 1987 IAAF World Indoor Championships in the men's 400 metres though did not advance further from the heats. He then competed at the 1988 Summer Olympics in Seoul for his last Olympic Games. Jassim was designated as the nation's flagbearer in the opening ceremony. He ran in a time of 50.62 in the men's 400 metres hurdles and did not advance further.

After his sporting career, he was designated as the flagbearer for Bahrain at the 2004 Summer Olympics in the opening and closing ceremonies.
