= Bahrain at the Olympics =

- IOC code: BRN
- NOC: Bahrain Olympic Committee
- Medals Ranked 79th: Gold 4 Silver 3 Bronze 1 Total 8

Summer appearances
- 1984; 1988; 1992; 1996; 2000; 2004; 2008; 2012; 2016; 2020; 2024

Bahrain has competed in 11 Summer Olympic Games since its debut in 1984. The nation has never competed in the Winter Olympic Games.

Until 2024, all the Bahraini Olympic medals were won by naturalized African long-distance runners. The country's first podium was a bronze in the women's 1500 meters run, by the former Ethiopian Maryam Yusuf Jamal in the 2012 London Summer Olympics. IOC reallocated the medals in Women's 1500 m event due to the disqualification of the gold and silver medallists Aslı Çakır Alptekin and Gamze Bulut, and bronze medalist Jamal advanced to the gold. Four years later in the 2016 Rio Olympics, two Kenyan women got Bahrain's first gold and silver medals, Ruth Jebet in the 3000m steeplechase and Eunice Kirwa in the marathon. At the 2008 Summer Olympics in Beijing, the former Moroccan Rashid Ramzi was originally awarded the gold medal in athletics in men's 1,500 meters but it was later stripped due to a doping violation.

The 2024 Summer Olympics were Bahrain's most successful yet, with Bahrain winning four medals, including Akhmed Tazhudinov winning its first wrestling gold and Gor Minasyan a bronze in weightlifting.

== Medal tables ==
=== Medals by Summer Games ===
Games	Athletes	Gold	Silver	Bronze	Total	Rank
1984 Los Angeles	10	0	0	0	0	–
1988 Seoul	7	0	0	0	0	–
1992 Barcelona	10	0	0	0	0	–
1996 Atlanta	5	0	0	0	0	–
2000 Sydney	4	0	0	0	0	–
2004 Athens	10	0	0	0	0	–
2008 Beijing	15	0	0	0	0	–
2012 London	12	1	0	0	1	51
2016 Rio de Janeiro	35	1	1	0	2	48
2020 Tokyo	32	0	1	0	1	77
2024 Paris	14	2	1	1	4	33
2028 Los Angeles	future event					
2032 Brisbane	future event					
Total		4	3	1	8	79

=== Medals by sport ===
Sport	Gold	Silver	Bronze	Total
Athletics	3	3	0	6
Wrestling	1	0	0	1
Weightlifting	0	0	1	1
Totals (3 entries)	4	3	1	8

== List of medalists ==
Medal	Name	Games	Sport	Event
Gold	Maryam Yusuf Jamal	2012 London	Athletics	Women's 1500 m
Gold	Ruth Jebet	2016 Rio de Janeiro	Athletics	Women's 3000 m steeplechase
Silver	Eunice Kirwa	2016 Rio de Janeiro	Athletics	Women's marathon
Silver	Kalkidan Gezahegne	2020 Tokyo	Athletics	Women's 10,000 m
Gold	Winfred Yavi	2024 Paris	Athletics	Women's 3000 m steeplechase
Gold	Akhmed Tazhudinov	2024 Paris	Wrestling	Men's −97 kg
Silver	Salwa Eid Naser	2024 Paris	Athletics	Women's 400 m
Bronze	Gor Minasyan	2024 Paris	Weightlifting	Men's +102 kg

== See also ==
- List of flag bearers for Bahrain at the Olympics
- Bahrain at the Paralympics
