= Rick Mayhew =

Olympic sailor from South Africa

Personal information
- Full name: Richard James Mayhew
- Nationality: South Africa
- Born: 15 December 1970 (age 55) Cape Town
- Height: 1.83 m (6.0 ft)

Sport

Sailing career
- Class: Soling
- Club: RCYC, Cape Town
- Updated on 29 February 2020

Richard James Mayhew (born 15 December 1970) is a sailor from Cape Town, South Africa. who represented his country at the 1992 Summer Olympics in Barcelona, Spain as crew member in the Soling. With helmsman Bruce Savage and fellow crew member Giles Stanley they took the 14th place. Rick with helmsman Bruce Savage and fellow crew member Clynton Lehman took 17th place during the 1996 Summer Olympics in Savannah, United States in the Soling. He won 1997 and 2001 J/22 World Championship as part of the crew for Ian Ainslie.
