= Clynton Lehman =

Olympic sailor from South Africa

Personal information
- Full name: Clynton Wade Wade-Lehman
- Nationality: South Africa
- Born: 19 November 1971 (age 54) Durban
- Height: 1.80 m (5.9 ft)

Sailing career
- Sport: Sailing
- Class: Soling
- Updated on 1 March 2020

Clynton Lehman (born: 19 November 1971) is a sailor from Durban, South Africa. who represented his country at the 1996 Summer Olympics in Savannah, United States as crew member in the Soling. With helmsman Bruce Savage and fellow crew member Rick Mayhew they took the 17th place.
