= Dmitry Shabanov =

Russian sailor

Personal information
- Full name: Dmitry Alekseyevich Shabanov
- Nationality: Russian
- Born: 19 July 1964 (age 61) Moscow, Russia
- Height: 187 cm (6 ft 2 in)
- Weight: 106 kg (234 lb)

Sailing career
- Sport: Sailing
- Class: Soling
Medal record
Men's sailing
Representing Russia
Olympic Games
Silver medal – second place	1996 Atlanta	Soling class

Dmitry Alekseyevich Shabanov (Russian: Дмитрий Алексеевич Шабанов, born 19 July 1964) is an Olympic sailor. He won the silver medal in the Soling class at the 1996 Summer Olympics.
