= Rehana Begum =

Indian artisan

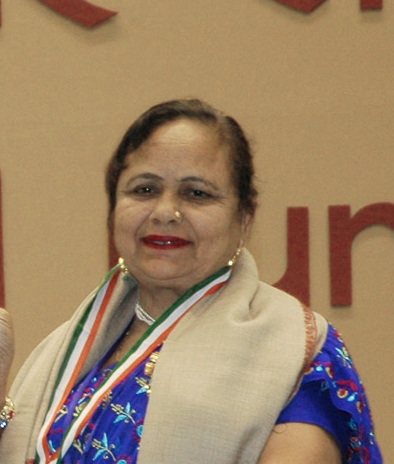
- Born: 1952 (age 73–74); India
- Occupation: Artisan
- Known for: Chikan (embroidery) work
- Father: Hassan Mirza
- Relatives: Naseem Bano (sister)
- Awards: Shilp Guru Award by Government of India

Rehana Begum (born 1952) is an Indian artisan from Lucknow, Uttar Pradesh. She is known for her Chikan (embroidery) work. She learnt the craft from her father, Hassan Mirza. She was awarded the Shilp Guru award by the Government of India in 2003 for her contributions to the art.

Her work is displayed at the Craft Museum of Uttar Pradesh, and she has participated in numerous exhibitions.
