= Willem Potma =

Dutch sailor (born 1969)

Personal information
- Full name: Willem Nico Potma
- Nationality: Dutch
- Born: 12 March 1969 (age 57) Sneek
- Height: 1.79 m (5.9 ft)

Sailing career
- Sport: Sailing
- Class(es): Flying Dutchman; Soling
- Updated on 19 February 2014

Willem Nico Potma (born 12 March 1969 in Sneek) is a sailor from the Netherlands, who represented his country at the 1992 Summer Olympics in Barcelona. Potma as helmsman in the Dutch Flying Dutchman with his brother Gerhard Potma as crew took the 18th place. In 1996 Potma returned to the Olympics in Savannah. Again with his brother and Frank Hettinga as crew. Potma took 15th place in the Soling.

== Professional life ==
Potma has an education in retail business. He now works as a self-employed sailmaker.
