= Marshall King (sailor) =

Olympic sailor from Ireland

Personal information
- Nationality: Ireland
- Born: 5 April 1966 (age 60) Dublin
- Height: 180
- Weight: 74

Sailing career
- Sport: Sailing
- College team: Dublin University
- Club: Royal St George Yacht Club
- Class: Soling
- Updated on 1 March 2020

Marshall King (born 5 April 1966) is a sailor from Ireland, who represented his country at the 1996 Summer Olympics in Savannah, United States as helmsman in the Soling. With crew members Garrett Connolly and Dan O'Grady they took the 16th place.
