= Bahrain at the 2000 Summer Olympics =

- IOC code: BRN
- NOC: Bahrain Olympic Committee

in Sydney
- Competitors: 4 in 2 sports
- Flag bearer: Dawood Yosuf Mohamed Jassim
- Medals: Gold 0 Silver 0 Bronze 0 Total 0

Summer Olympics appearances (overview)
- 1984; 1988; 1992; 1996; 2000; 2004; 2008; 2012; 2016; 2020; 2024

Bahrain sent a delegation to compete at the 2000 Summer Olympics in Sydney, Australia, which were held from 15 September to 1 October 2000. This was the fifth consecutive Summer Olympics the Kingdom took part in. The delegation consisted of four athletes: sprinter Mariam Mohamed Hadi Al Hilli, middle-distance runner Mohamed Saleh Hadj Haidara and short-distance swimmers Dawood Yosuf Mohamed Jassim and Fatema Hameed Gerashi. Al Hilli and Gerashi's inclusion in the Bahraini delegation was the first time in history a Gulf Arab nation had sent female athletes to the Olympic Games. All four did not progress beyond the initial heats of their respective competitions. Bahrain's best performance came from Haidara and Jassim who placed seventh in the heats of the men's 800 metres and the men's 100 metres freestyle. Gerashi was disqualified for a false start in the women's 50 metres freestyle and Al Hilli came eighth in her heat in the women's 100 metres.

== Background ==
The Bahrain Olympic Committee was recognised by the International Olympic Committee (IOC) on 1 January 1979. The Kingdom debuted at the Summer Olympic Games at the 1984 Summer Olympics, and Sydney is their fifth consecutive appearance in a Summer Olympiad. At the time of the Sydney Games, no Bahraini athlete had ever won a medal at the Summer Olympics. The 2000 Summer Olympics were held from 15 September to 1 October 2000. Of the 10,651 athletes representing 199 National Olympic Committees, Bahrain sent four: sprinter Mariam Mohamed Hadi Al Hilli, middle-distance runner Mohamed Saleh Hadj Haidara and short-distance swimmers Dawood Yosuf Mohamed Jassim and Fatema Hameed Gerashi. Al Hilli and Hameed were the debut female Olympians from a Gulf Arab nation. Jassim was the flag bearer of the national flag of Bahrain at the Parade of Nations.

== Competitors ==
In total, 4 athletes represented Bahrain at the 2000 Summer Olympics in Sydney, New South Wales, Australia across two different sports.

Sport	Men	Women	Total
Athletics	1	1	2
Swimming	1	1	2
Total	2	2	4

== Athletics ==
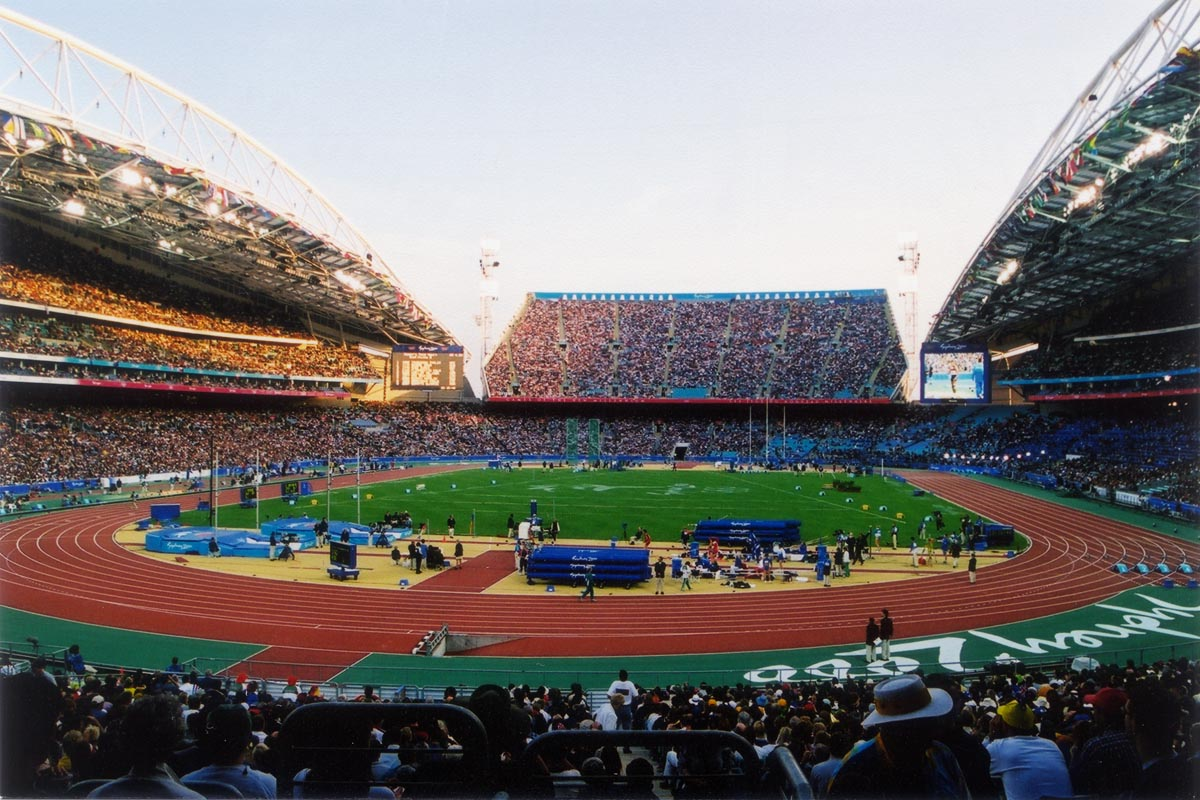
The Sydney Olympic Park where Haidara and Al Hilli competed in athletics events

Mohamed Saleh Hadj Haidara was 25 years old at the time of the Sydney Summer Games and was making his only appearance in the Olympics. He made the Games by using a wild card because his best time for the men's 800 metres of one minute and 50.57 seconds, set at a meet in the Czech capital of Prague in June 2000, was 3.37 seconds slower than the "B" qualifying standard for that event. On 23 September, the first round of the men's 800 meters was held and Haidara was allocated heat six. He finished the race in seventh place and last out of all the finishing runners with a time of one minute and 56.64 seconds. However, only the top two from a heat and the eight next fastest overall from all ten heats were allowed to advance to the semi-finals, and Haidara was eliminated, the slowest overall time being a one minute and 59.97 seconds from Marvin Watts of Jamaica. (Note: One runner, Mohammad Alkafraini was disqualified, and another Mohamed Babiker Yagoub, did not start.)

At the age of 16, Mariam Mohamed Hadi Al Hilli was also debuting at the Sydney Summer Olympics and this competition was her only appearance at the Olympic Games. She was permitted to run in the women's 100 metres by using a wild card offered to her by the IOC since she did not meet the qualifying standards for the competition and her father was consulted on this. Before the Games, Al Hilli said, "I'm really charged up and I want to do my best for my country. But at the same time, more than the pressure to win, I would say there is this sense of being a part of history in the making. I don't think anyone expects us to win we are going as part of Bahrain's new movement to encourage women's sports." She was drawn in the eighth heat on 22 September, finishing eighth and last of all athletes, with a personal best time of 13.98 seconds, after a false start. Only the top three from each heat, plus the next two fastest between all ten heats could advance, and so Al Hilli was eliminated.

=== Key ===
- Note–Ranks given for track events are within the athlete's heat only
- PB = Personal best

Athlete	Event	Heat		Quarterfinal		Semifinal		Final	
Athlete	Event	Result	Rank	Result	Rank	Result	Rank	Result	Rank
Mohamed Saleh Hadj Haidara	Men's 800 m	1:56.64	7	Did not advance					
Mariam Mohamed Hadi Al Hilli	Women's 100 m	13.98 PB	8	Did not advance					

== Swimming ==
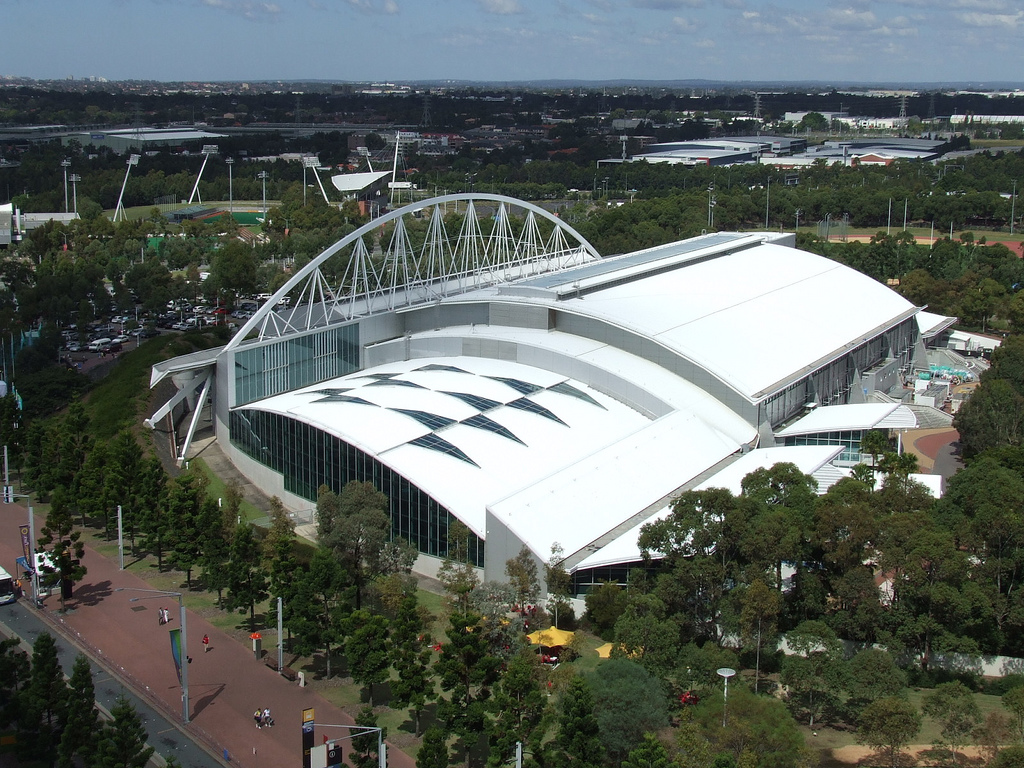
The Sydney Olympic Park Aquatic Centre where Jassim and Gerashi competed in swimming events.

Competing in his first and only Summer Olympics, 20-year old Dawood Yosuf Mohamed Jassim was the youngest man to compete on behalf of Bahrain at the Sydney Games. He received a universality place from the world governing body of swimming, FINA, because his entry time of one minute and 10 seconds was 17.41 seconds slower than the "B" (FINA/Olympic Invitation) time needed to attain automatic qualification for the men's 100 metre freestyle. In the first round of Jassim's contest, he was drawn to swim in the second heat on 19 September. He completed the race in a time of one minute and 2.45 seconds, which put him seventh and last of all the swimmers in his heat. Jassim placed 70th out of 71 finishing athletes overall and this meant he did not progress to the semifinals since only the top 16 were permitted to advance to that stage. (Note: Two swimmers, Karim Bare and Farkhod Oripov, were disqualified, and another, Fernando Scherer did not start.)

Fatema Hameed Gerashi was the youngest athlete of any event and of any nationality to compete at the 2000 Sydney Summer Olympics at the age of 12. She was also the first Olympic female athlete from a Gulf Arab nation. The IOC gave Gerashi a wild card and she was granted permission by her parents to compete in Sydney. She began swimming at the age of seven and later joined the Bahrain Swimming Association. However, local Muslim customs forbade Hameed from swimming with men until she began training at the Sydney Olympic Park Aquatic Centre. On 22 September, Gerash swam in heat one of the women's 50 metre freestyle event and swam against two competitors. She finished second with a time of 51.15 seconds but officials disqualified her because she wobbled on the starting blocks, which was deemed a false start despite her not being the first competitor to enter the water. Although Gerashi was disappointed, she said, "It felt great. But I was very scared on the blocks. My heart was going very fast. I was thinking about all the training I'd done and trying to make my family happy." She received praise from the press for competing in the Games as it was reportedly part of the Bahraini government's stated effort to promote "equality in sport".

Athlete	Event	Heat		Semifinal		Final	
Athlete	Event	Time	Rank	Time	Rank	Time	Rank
Dawood Yosuf Mohamed Jassim	Men's 100 m freestyle	1:02.45	7	Did not advance			
Fatema Hameed Gerashi	Women's 50 m freestyle	DSQ		Did not advance			

== See also ==
- Bahrain at the 2000 Summer Paralympics
