= Dan O'Grady =

Olympic sailor from Ireland

Personal information
- Nationality: Ireland
- Born: 16 August 1968 (age 57) Sutton, Dublin

Sport

Sailing career
- Class: Soling
- Updated on 1 March 2020

Dan O'Grady (born 16 August 1968) is a sailor from Sutton, Dublin, Ireland. who represented his country at the 1996 Summer Olympics in Savannah, United States as crew member in the Soling. With helmsman Marshall King and fellow crew member Garrett Connolly they took the 16th place.
