= Bahrain at the 2016 Summer Olympics =

- IOC code: BRN
- NOC: Bahrain Olympic Committee

in Rio de Janeiro
- Competitors: 35 in 4 sports
- Flag bearer: Farhan Saleh
- Medals Ranked 48th: Gold 1 Silver 1 Bronze 0 Total 2

Summer Olympics appearances (overview)
- 1984; 1988; 1992; 1996; 2000; 2004; 2008; 2012; 2016; 2020; 2024

Bahrain competed at the 2016 Summer Olympics in Rio de Janeiro, Brazil, from 5 to 21 August 2016. This nation marked its ninth consecutive appearance at the Summer Olympics.

The Bahrain Olympic Committee fielded a team of 35 athletes, 21 men and 14 women, across four different sports at the Games. It was the nation's largest ever delegation sent to the Olympics, roughly a triple of its full roster size at any edition since it debuted in 1984. Among the sports represented by the nation's athletes, Bahrain marked its Olympic debut in wrestling. More than fifty percent of the nation's roster were born outside Bahrain; majority of its athletes hailed from select African countries, particularly in Nigeria, Ethiopia, and Kenya.

Notable Bahraini athletes featured sprinters Abubakar Abbas and Ali Khamis in the men's 400 metres, London 2012 Olympians Mimi Belete and Shitaye Eshete (both came from Ethiopia), Kenyan-born marathon runner and 2015 world bronze medalist Eunice Kirwa, Jamaican-born sprinters Kemarley Brown and Andrew Fisher, Russian-born freestyle wrestler Adam Batirov, and freestyle swimmer Farhan Saleh, who eventually carried the nation's flag at the opening ceremony, the first by a male since 2004.

Bahrain left Rio de Janeiro with two medals (one gold and one silver), signifying its most successful outcome in Olympic history. These medals were awarded to Bahrain's first ever Olympic champion Ruth Jebet in the women's 3000 m steeplechase, and Kirwa, who earned a silver in the women's marathon.

== Medalists ==
Medal	Name	Sport	Event	Date
Gold	Ruth Jebet	Athletics	Women's 3000 m steeplechase	15 August
Silver	Eunice Kirwa	Athletics	Women's marathon	14 August

== Athletics ==
Bahraini athletes have so far achieved qualifying standards in the following athletics events (up to a maximum of 3 athletes in each event): The track and field team was named on May 11, 2016, including track star Abubakar Abbas, 2014 Asian Games champion Kemi Adekoya, and two-time silver medalist Mimi Belete.

Key

- Note–Ranks given for track events are within the athlete's heat only
- Q = Qualified for the next round
- q = Qualified for the next round as a fastest loser or, in field events, by position without achieving the qualifying target
- NR = National record
- N/A = Round not applicable for the event
- Bye = Athlete not required to compete in round

Track & road events
Men

Athlete	Event	Heat		Quarterfinal		Semifinal		Final	
Athlete	Event	Result	Rank	Result	Rank	Result	Rank	Result	Rank
Kemarley Brown	100 m	Bye		10.13	1 Q	10.13	5	Did not advance	
Andrew Fisher	100 m	Bye		10.12	2 Q	DSQ		Did not advance	
Salem Eid Yaqoob	200 m	20.19	1 Q	—		20.43	5	Did not advance	
Abubakar Abbas	400 m	DSQ		—		Did not advance			
Ali Khamis	400 m	45.12	1 Q	—		44.49	3 q	44.36 NR	6
Abraham Rotich	800 m	DSQ		—		Did not advance			
Benson Seurei	1500 m	3:38.82	7 q	—		3:40.53	8	Did not advance	
Zouhair Aouad	5000 m	DNF		—				Did not advance	
Birhanu Balew	5000 m	13:19.83	4 Q	—				13:09.26	9
Albert Kibichii Rop	5000 m	13:24.95	2 Q	—				13:08.79	7
Nelson Cherutich	3000 m steeplechase	8:35.87	9	—				Did not advance	
John Kibet Koech	3000 m steeplechase	8:28.81	6	—				Did not advance	
Hassan Chani	10000 m	—						DNF	
Abraham Cheroben	10000 m	—						27:31.86	10
El Hassan El-Abbassi	10000 m	—						28:20.17	26
Alemu Bekele	Marathon	—						DNF	
Isaac Korir	Marathon	—						DNF	

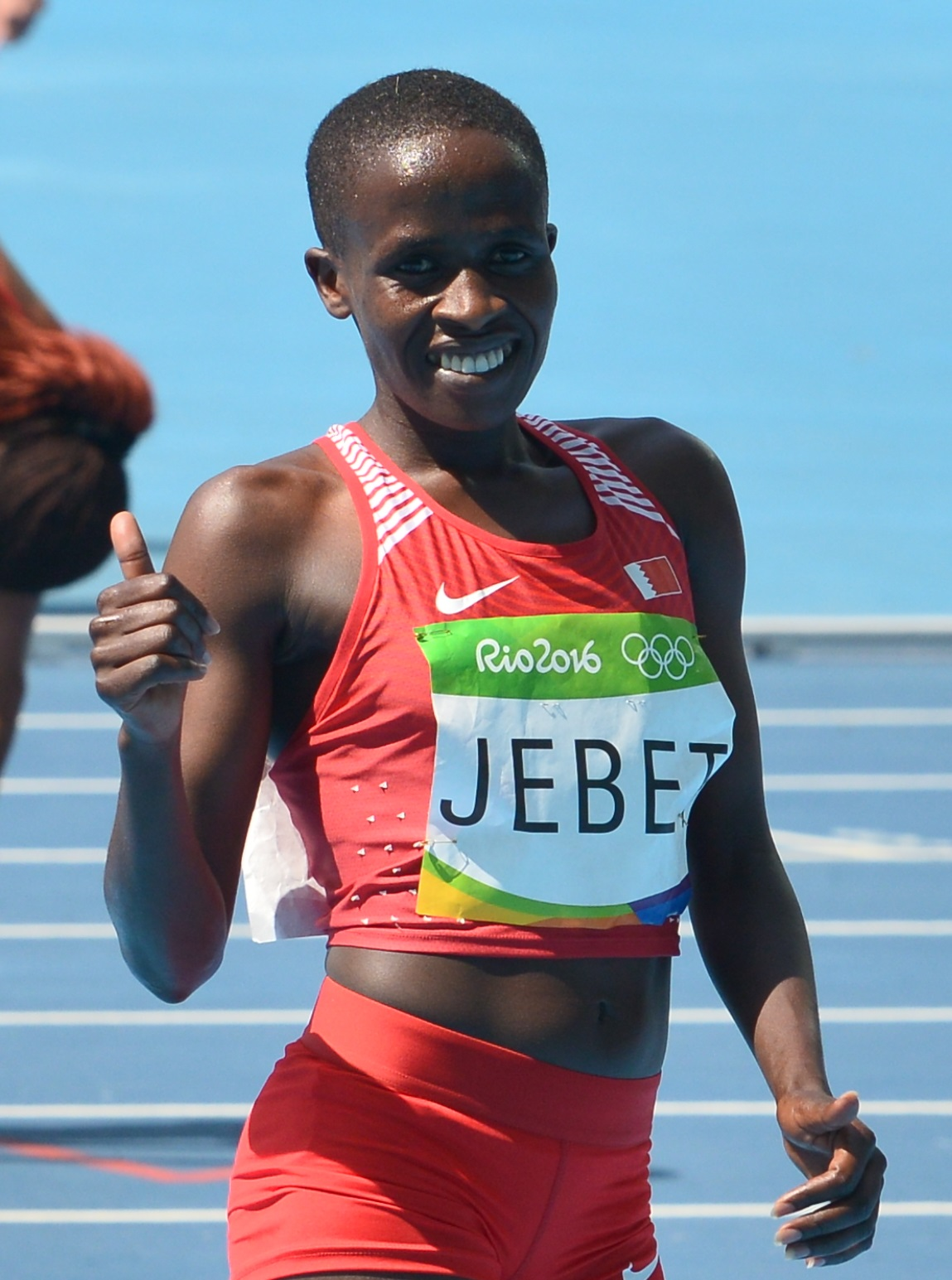
Ruth Jebet gave Bahrain its first Olympic gold medal in the women's 3000 m steeplechase.

Women

Athlete	Event	Heat		Quarterfinal		Semifinal		Final	
Athlete	Event	Result	Rank	Result	Rank	Result	Rank	Result	Rank
Hajar Alkhaldi	100 m	Bye		11.59	6	Did not advance			
Iman Essa Jasim	100 m	Bye		11.72	7	Did not advance			
Edidiong Odiong	200 m	22.74	1 Q	—		22.84	6	Did not advance	
Oluwakemi Adekoya	400 m	50.72	2 Q	—		50.88	4	Did not advance	
Tigist Gashaw	1500 m	4:10.96	11	—		Did not advance			
Mimi Belete	5000 m	15:29.72	10	—				Did not advance	
Dalila Abdulkadir Gosa	5000 m	DNS		—				Did not advance	
Ruth Jebet	3000 m steeplechase	9:12.62	1 Q	—				8:59.75	1st place, gold medalist(s)
Tigest Mekonin	3000 m steeplechase	9:49.92	12	—				Did not advance	
Rose Chelimo	Marathon	—						2:27:36	8
Shitaye Eshete	Marathon	—						DNF	
Eunice Kirwa	Marathon	—						2:24:13	2nd place, silver medalist(s)

== Shooting ==
Bahrain has received an invitation from ISSF to send Mahmood Haji in the men's rifle events to the Olympics.

Athlete	Event	Qualification		Final	
Athlete	Event	Points	Rank	Points	Rank
Mahmood Haji	Men's 50 m rifle prone	612.6	46	Did not advance	

Qualification Legend: Q = Qualify for the next round; q = Qualify for the bronze medal (shotgun)

== Swimming ==
Bahrain has received a Universality invitation from FINA to send two swimmers (one male and one female) to the Olympics.

Athlete	Event	Heat		Semifinal		Final	
Athlete	Event	Time	Rank	Time	Rank	Time	Rank
Farhan Saleh	Men's 50 m freestyle	24.61	58	Did not advance			
Fatema Almahmeed	Women's 50 m freestyle	32.28	74	Did not advance			

== Wrestling ==
Bahrain has qualified one wrestler for the men's freestyle 65 kg into the Olympic competition as a result of his semifinal triumph at the initial meet of the World Qualification Tournament in Istanbul, signifying the nation's debut in the sport.

Key:

- VT – Victory by Fall.
- PP – Decision by Points – the loser with technical points.
- PO – Decision by Points – the loser without technical points.
- ST – Technical superiority – the loser without technical points and a margin of victory of at least 8 (Greco-Roman) or 10 (freestyle) points.
- SP – Technical superiority – the loser with technical points and a margin of victory of at least 8 (Greco-Roman) or 10 (freestyle) points.

Men's freestyle

Athlete	Event	Qualification	Round of 16	Quarterfinal	Semifinal	Repechage 1	Repechage 2	Final / BM	
Athlete	Event	Opposition Result	Opposition Result	Opposition Result	Opposition Result	Opposition Result	Opposition Result	Opposition Result	Rank
Adam Batirov	−65 kg	Bye	Navruzov (UZB); L 1–3 ^{PP}	Did not advance					14
