= Ahmed Al-Saie =

Bahraini sailor

Personal information
- Nationality: Bahraini
- Born: 17 December 1952 (age 72)

Sport
- Sport: Sailing

Ahmed Al-Saie (Arabic: أحمد الساعي, born 17 December 1952) is a Bahraini sailor. He competed in the Soling event at the 1996 Summer Olympics.
