= Nasar Sakar Saeed =

Kenyan-born Bahraini marathon runner

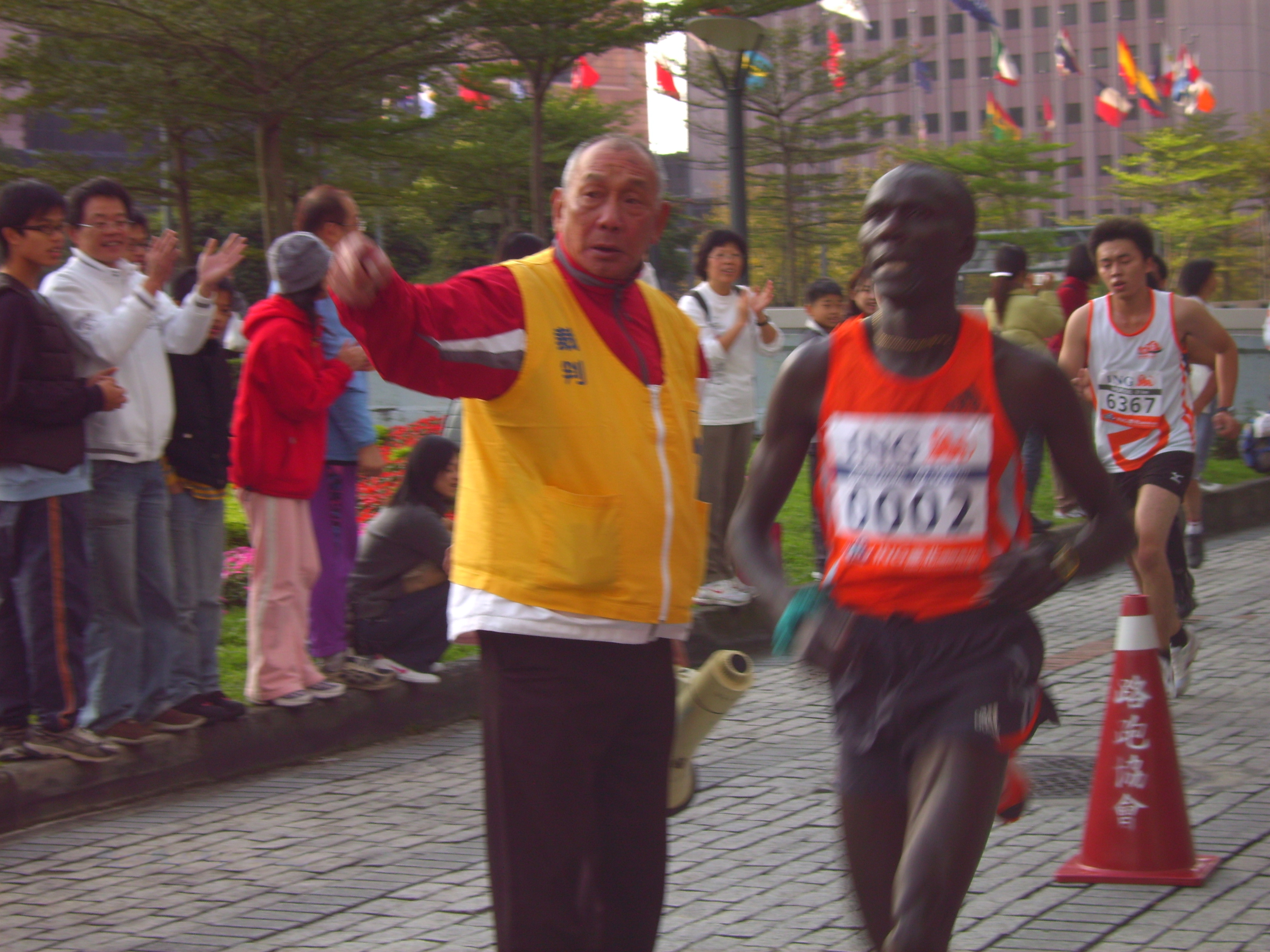
- Stephen Loruo Kamar (0002) at the 2006 2006 ING Taipei International Marathon

Personal information
- Nationality: Bahrain
- Born: Stephen Loruo Kamar; 26 January 1978 (age 48) Kenya
- Height: 1.74 m (5 ft 8 1/2 in)
- Weight: 66 kg (146 lb)

Sport
- Sport: Athletics
- Event: Marathon

Achievements and titles
- Personal best: Marathon: 2:10:46

Nasar Sakar Saeed (Arabic: نصار صقر سعيد; born January 26, 1978, in Kenya, as Stephen Loruo Kamar) is a Bahraini marathon runner of Kenyan origin. Saeed represented Bahrain at the 2008 Summer Olympics in Beijing, where he competed for the men's marathon, along with his compatriots Abdulhak Zakaria, and Al Mustafa Riyadh. He finished the race in thirty-seventh place by one second ahead of Eritrea's Yonas Kifle, with a time of 2:20:24.

Saeed also achieved his personal best time of 2:10:46, by winning the championship title at the 2006 Xiamen Marathon.
