= Athletics at the 1985 Arab Games =

Bokopubg

Athletics at the 1985 Pan Arab Games

Athletics at the 1985 Pan Arab Games were held in Casablanca, Morocco from August 3 to 8, 1985.

== MEN ==
=== 100m ===
MEDAL	ATHLETE	DOB	COUNTRY	MARK	W/I	RECORD	NOTES
Gold	Faraj Marzouk	1961	QAT	10.52		CR	
Silver	Omar Ghizlat	1950	MAR	10.55			
Bronze	Mustafa Kamel Selmi	1965	ALG	10.56			

=== 200m ===
MEDAL	ATHLETE	DOB	COUNTRY	MARK	W/I	RECORD	NOTES
Gold	Omar Ghizlat	1950	MAR	21.15		CR	
Silver	Jamal Sulaiman		QAT	21.27			
Bronze	Mustafa Kamel Selmi	1965	ALG	21.39			

=== 400m ===
MEDAL	ATHLETE	DOB	COUNTRY	MARK	W/I	RECORD	NOTES
Gold	Aouf Abdulrahman Yousef	1960	IRQ	46.29			
Silver	Ali Bakhta	1961	ALG	46.63			
Bronze	Said M'Hand	1958	MAR	46.79			

=== 800m ===
MEDAL	ATHLETE	DOB	COUNTRY	MARK	W/I	RECORD	NOTES
Gold	Omar Khalifa	1956	SUD	1:47.06		CR	
Silver	Abdi Bile	1962	SOM	1:47.24			
Bronze	Ibrahim Omar		SOM	1:48.08			

=== 1500m ===
MEDAL	ATHLETE	DOB	COUNTRY	MARK	W/I	RECORD	NOTES
Gold	Said Aouita	1959	MAR	3:35.63		CR	
Silver	Abdi Bile	1962	SOM	3:36.92			
Bronze	Rachid Kram	1963	ALG	3:43.85			

=== 5000m ===
MEDAL	ATHLETE	DOB	COUNTRY	MARK	W/I	RECORD	NOTES
Gold	Fethi Baccouche	1960	TUN	14:09.50		CR	
Silver	Abderrazzak Bounour	1957	ALG	14:10.27			
Bronze	Arabi Al Moukdine		MAR	14:10.47			

=== 10,000m ===
MEDAL	ATHLETE	DOB	COUNTRY	MARK	W/I	RECORD	NOTES
Gold	Abderrazak Gtari	1960	TUN	29:07.7		CR	
Silver	Ahmed Musa Jouda	1957	SUD	29:07.8			
Bronze	Habib Ramadan	1960	TUN	29:10.7			

=== Marathon ===
MEDAL	ATHLETE	DOB	COUNTRY	MARK	W/I	RECORD	NOTES
Gold	Lahbib Ouhbib		MAR	2:19:59			
Silver	Omar Musa Bouh	1961	DJI	2:20:43			
Bronze	Hamadache Azraki		ALG	2:30:00			

=== 3000SC ===
MEDAL	ATHLETE	DOB	COUNTRY	MARK	W/I	RECORD	NOTES
Gold	Fethi Baccouche	1960	TUN	8:34.80		CR	
Silver	Habib Cherif		ALG	8:36.52			
Bronze	Mohammed Mastour		MAR	8:39.55			

=== 110H ===
MEDAL	ATHLETE	DOB	COUNTRY	MARK	W/I	RECORD	NOTES
Gold	Ahmed Hamada	1961	BRN	14.29		CR	
Silver	Naji Mohsen Ghazi		IRQ	14.42			
Bronze	Rashid Sheban Marzouk	1967	QAT	14.44			

=== 400H ===
MEDAL	ATHLETE	DOB	COUNTRY	MARK	W/I	RECORD	NOTES
Gold	Ahmed Hamada	1961	BRN	50.13		CR	
Silver	Jasem Al-Douwaila	1963	KUW	50.74			
Bronze	Fadhel Khayati	1965	TUN	51.69			

=== HJ ===
MEDAL	ATHLETE	DOB	COUNTRY	MARK	W/I	RECORD	NOTES
Gold	Mohamed Aghlal	1961	MAR	2.16		CR	
Silver	Khalid Koughbar		MAR	2.11			
Bronze	Othmane Belfaa	1961	ALG	2.11			

=== PV ===
MEDAL	ATHLETE	DOB	COUNTRY	MARK	W/I	RECORD	NOTES
Gold	Mohamed Bouihiri		MAR	4.70		CR	
Silver	Youssef Qortobi		MAR	4.60			
Bronze	Naser Al-Wahibi	1966	KSA	4.60			

=== LJ ===
MEDAL	ATHLETE	DOB	COUNTRY	MARK	W/I	RECORD	NOTES
Gold	Mohamed Abdusalam Bishti	1957	LBA	7.68		CR	
Silver	Mustapha Benmarah		MAR	7.39			
Bronze	Mohammed El-Aid Zaghoudi	1963	TUN	7.36			

=== TJ ===
MEDAL	ATHLETE	DOB	COUNTRY	MARK	W/I	RECORD	NOTES
Gold	Fethi Khalifa Aboud	1964	LBA	16.13		CR	
Silver	Mustapha Benmarah		MAR	15.90			
Bronze	Hasan Nassir		IRQ	15.82			

=== SP ===
MEDAL	ATHLETE	DOB	COUNTRY	MARK	W/I	RECORD	NOTES
Gold	Mohamed Fatihi		MAR	17.28		CR	
Silver	Mahmoud Shakir		IRQ	16.78			
Bronze	Mahmoud Abel		KUW	16.24			

=== DT ===
MEDAL	ATHLETE	DOB	COUNTRY	MARK	W/I	RECORD	NOTES
Gold	Abderrazak Benhassine	1957	TUN	54.76		CR	
Silver	Yacine Louail	1958	ALG	50.88			
Bronze	Mohamed Fatihi		MAR	50.46			

=== HT ===
MEDAL	ATHLETE	DOB	COUNTRY	MARK	W/I	RECORD	NOTES
Gold	Hakim Toumi	1961	ALG	66.32		CR	
Silver	Yacine Louail	1958	ALG	62.40			
Bronze	Walid Saleh Al-Bekhit	1965	KUW	59.98			

=== JT ===
MEDAL	ATHLETE	DOB	COUNTRY	MARK	W/I	RECORD	NOTES
Gold	Ahmed Mahour Bacha	1961	ALG	76.88		CR	
Silver	Tarek Chaabani	1957	TUN	75.98			
Bronze	Ghanem Mabrouk Zaid Johar	1965	KUW	72.22			

=== 20kmW ===
MEDAL	ATHLETE	DOB	COUNTRY	MARK	W/I	RECORD	NOTES
Gold	Abdelwahab Ferguene	1958	ALG	1:32:31			
Silver	Benamar Kachkouche	1951	ALG	1:35:34			
Bronze	Hassan Kouchaoui		MAR	1:43:19			

=== Decathlon ===
MEDAL	ATHLETE	DOB	COUNTRY	MARK	W/I	RECORD	NOTES
Gold	Ahmed Mahour Bacha	1961	ALG	7577	pts	CR	
Silver	Hatem Bachar	1963	TUN	7124	pts		
Bronze	Abdenasir Moumen		MAR	6848	pts		

=== 4x100m ===
MEDAL	ATHLETE	DOB	COUNTRY	MARK	W/I	RECORD	NOTES
Gold	-		QAT	40.17		CR	
Gold	-		QAT	40.17		CR	
Gold	Jamal Sulaiman		QAT	40.17		CR	
Gold	Faraj Marzouk	1961	QAT	40.17		CR	
Silver	-		MAR	40.54			
Silver	Rachid Baali		MAR	40.54			
Silver	-		MAR	40.54			
Silver	Omar Ghizlat	1950	MAR	40.54			
Bronze	-		KSA	40.95			
Bronze	-		KSA	40.95			
Bronze	-		KSA	40.95			
Bronze	-		KSA	40.95			

=== 4x400m ===
MEDAL	ATHLETE	DOB	COUNTRY	MARK	W/I	RECORD	NOTES
Gold	-		MAR	3:08.21		CR	
Gold	-		MAR	3:08.21		CR	
Gold	Brahim Aboualam		MAR	3:08.21		CR	
Gold	Said M'Hand	1958	MAR	3:08.21		CR	
Silver	-		IRQ	3:08.83			
Silver	-		IRQ	3:08.83			
Silver	Ismail Ahmed		IRQ	3:08.83			
Silver	Aouf Abdulrahman Yousef	1960	IRQ	3:08.83			
Bronze	-		ALG	3:09.16			
Bronze	-		ALG	3:09.16			
Bronze	Ali Bakhta	1961	ALG	3:09.16			
Bronze	Mohamed Aissaoui		ALG	3:09.16			

== WOMEN ==
=== 100m ===
MEDAL	ATHLETE	DOB	COUNTRY	MARK	W/I	RECORD	NOTES
Gold	Nawal El Moutawakel	1962	MAR	11.85		CR	
Silver	Meryem Oumezdi	1968	MAR	11.99			
Bronze	Intisar Shaker (1966)		IRQ	12.15			

=== 200m ===
MEDAL	ATHLETE	DOB	COUNTRY	MARK	W/I	RECORD	NOTES
Gold	Nawal El Moutawakel	1962	MAR	23.67		CR, NR	
Silver	Meryem Oumezdi	1968	MAR	24.89			
Bronze	Intisar Shaker (1966)		IRQ	25.07			

=== 400m ===
MEDAL	ATHLETE	DOB	COUNTRY	MARK	W/I	RECORD	NOTES
Gold	Nawal El Moutawakel	1962	MAR	53.23		CR	
Silver	Sara Touibi	1959	TUN	55.14			
Bronze	Iman Sabih Hussein (1966)		IRQ	55.48			

=== 800m ===
MEDAL	ATHLETE	DOB	COUNTRY	MARK	W/I	RECORD	NOTES
Gold	Fatima Aouam	1959	MAR	2:04.39		CR	
Silver	Iman Sabih Hussein (1966)		IRQ	2:04.92			
Bronze	Rashida Asnam		MAR	2:06.78			

=== 1500m ===
MEDAL	ATHLETE	DOB	COUNTRY	MARK	W/I	RECORD	NOTES
Gold	Fatima Aouam	1959	MAR	4:17.43			
Silver	Hassania Darami	1953	MAR	4:20.48			
Bronze	Mubaraka Al Hajj Abdallah		ALG	4:27.55			

=== 3000m ===
MEDAL	ATHLETE	DOB	COUNTRY	MARK	W/I	RECORD	NOTES
Gold	Hassania Darami	1953	MAR	9:18.98			
Silver	Mubaraka Al Hajj Abdallah		ALG	9:19.35			
Bronze	Malika Benhabyles		ALG	9:33.09			

=== 100H ===
MEDAL	ATHLETE	DOB	COUNTRY	MARK	W/I	RECORD	NOTES
Gold	Nacera Achir	1963	ALG	14.18			
Silver	Sherifa Meskaoui	1951	MAR	14.20		NR	
Bronze	Yasmina Azzizi-Kettab	1966	ALG	14.53			

=== 400H ===
MEDAL	ATHLETE	DOB	COUNTRY	MARK	W/I	RECORD	NOTES
Gold	Nawal El Moutawakel	1962	MAR	58.47		CR	
Silver	Aicha Faysal		MAR	1:00.77			
Bronze	Hind Kabaoiu	1969	TUN	1:03.74			

=== HJ ===
MEDAL	ATHLETE	DOB	COUNTRY	MARK	W/I	RECORD	NOTES
Gold	Kawther Akremi	1958	TUN	1.73			
Silver	Nacera Achir-Zaaboub	1963	ALG	1.71			
Bronze	Dalila Tayebi	1959	ALG	1.67			

=== LJ ===
MEDAL	ATHLETE	DOB	COUNTRY	MARK	W/I	RECORD	NOTES
Gold	Basma Gharbi	1963	TUN	6.03		NR	
Silver	Naima Benboubker	1955	MAR	5.78			
Bronze	Dalila Tayebi	1959	ALG	5.69			

=== SP ===
MEDAL	ATHLETE	DOB	COUNTRY	MARK	W/I	RECORD	NOTES
Gold	Souad Malloussi	1957	MAR	15.23			
Silver	Sherifa Meskaoui	1951	MAR	14.29			
Bronze	Aicha Dahmous	1958	ALG	14.26			

=== DT ===
MEDAL	ATHLETE	DOB	COUNTRY	MARK	W/I	RECORD	NOTES
Gold	Zoubaida Laayouni	1956	MAR	52.54			
Silver	Aicha Dahmous	1958	ALG	50.22			
Bronze	Sherifa Meskaoui	1951	MAR	44.56			

=== JT ===
MEDAL	ATHLETE	DOB	COUNTRY	MARK	W/I	RECORD	NOTES
Gold	Samia Djemaa	1963	ALG	52.40			
Silver	Samira Benhamza	1962	MAR	48.58			
Bronze	Zoubaida Laayouni	1956	MAR	36.74			

=== Heptathlon ===
MEDAL	ATHLETE	DOB	COUNTRY	MARK	W/I	RECORD	NOTES
Gold	Sherifa Meskaoui	1951	MAR	5305	pts	NR	
Silver	Nacera Achir-Zaaboub	1963	ALG	5172	pts		
Bronze	Yasmina Azzizi	1966	ALG	4714	pts		

=== 4x100m ===
MEDAL	ATHLETE	DOB	COUNTRY	MARK	W/I	RECORD	NOTES
Gold	-		MAR	46.21		CR	
Gold	Naima Benboubker	1955	MAR	46.21		CR	
Gold	Nawal El Moutawakel	1962	MAR	46.21		CR	
Gold	Meryem Oumezdi	1968	MAR	46.21		CR	
Silver	-		IRQ	47.79			
Silver	-		IRQ	47.79			
Silver	-		IRQ	47.79			
Silver	Intisar Shaker (1966)		IRQ	47.79			
Bronze	Nacera Achir-Zaaboub	1963	ALG	47.97			
Bronze	Dalila Tayebi	1959	ALG	47.97			
Bronze	Rachida Ferdjaoui (1965)		ALG	47.97			
Bronze	Souad Chouider		ALG	47.97			

=== 4x400m ===
MEDAL	ATHLETE	DOB	COUNTRY	MARK	W/I	RECORD	NOTES
Gold	-		MAR	3:40.54		CR	
Gold	Rashida Asnam		MAR	3:40.54		CR	
Gold	Aicha Faysal		MAR	3:40.54		CR	
Gold	Nawal El Moutawakel	1962	MAR	3:40.54		CR	
Silver	-		IRQ	3:46.00			
Silver	-		IRQ	3:46.00			
Silver	Intisar Shaker (1966)		IRQ	3:46.00			
Silver	Iman Sabih Hussein (1966)		IRQ	3:46.00			
Bronze	-		TUN	3:47.04			
Bronze	-		TUN	3:47.04			
Bronze	Hind Kabaoiu	1969	TUN	3:47.04			
Bronze	Sara Touibi	1959	TUN	3:47.04			

== Medal table ==
* Host nation (Morocco)

Women's competition:
Rank	Nation	Gold	Silver	Bronze	Total
1	Morocco*	12	8	2	22
2	Algeria	2	4	8	14
3	Tunisia	2	1	3	6
4	Iraq	0	3	3	6
Totals (4 entries)		16	16	16	48
