= Stavros Alevras =

Olympic sailor from Greece

Personal information
- Native name: Σταύρος Αλέυρας
- Nationality: Greece
- Born: 12 October 1970 Athens
- Height: 1.75 m (5.7 ft)

Sport

Sailing career
- Class: Soling
- Updated on 1 March 2020

Stavros Alevras (born 12 October 1970) is a sailor from Greece, who represented his country at the 1996 Summer Olympics in Savannah, United States as helmsman in the Soling. With crew members Panagiotis Alevras and Stefanos Chandakas they took the 18th place.
