= Husain Mahfoodh =

Bahraini handball player

Personal information
- Nationality: Bahraini
- Born: 29 June 2001 (age 25)
- Height: 1.87 m (6 ft 2 in)

Sport
- Sport: Handball
- Position: Goalkeeper
- Current club: Al-Ahli
- Number: 1
National team
Years	Team	Apps	(Gls)
–	Bahrain	12	(1)
Medal record
Asian Championship
Gold medal – first place	2026 Kuwait
Silver medal – second place	2018 South Korea
Silver medal – second place	2022 Saudi Arabia

Husain Mahfoodh (Arabic: حسين محفوظ, born 29 June 2001) is a Bahraini handball player for Al-Ahli and the Bahraini national team.

He represented Bahrain at the 2019 World Men's Handball Championship and at the delayed 2020 Summer Olympics.
