= Panagiotis Alevras =

Olympic sailor from Greece

Personal information
- Native name: Παναγιώτης Αλέυρας
- Nationality: Greece
- Born: 16 January 1969 (age 56) Athens
- Height: 1.75 m (5.7 ft)

Sport

Sailing career
- Class: Soling
- Updated on 1 March 2020

Panagiotis Alevras (born 16 January 1969) is a sailor from Athens, Greece. who represented his country at the 1996 Summer Olympics in Savannah, United States as crew member in the Soling. With helmsman Stavros Alevras and fellow crew member Stefanos Chandakas they took the 18th place.
