= Colin Alevras =

American restaurateur (1971–2022)

- Born: Colin Matthew Alevras; July 7, 1971; Suffern, New York, U.S.
- Died: October 1, 2022 (aged 51); Manhattan, New York, U.S.
- Education: Santa Fe University of Art and Design; Institute of Culinary Education
- Occupation: Restaurateur
- Spouse: Renee Alevras (m. 1997)
- Children: 2

Colin Matthew Alevras (July 7, 1971 – October 1, 2022) was an American restaurateur.

== Early life and career ==
Alevras was born in Suffern, New York, the son of Joan, a teacher and minister and Ronald Alevras, a project manager. He graduated from the Audubon Society Expedition Institute in 1989, the attended the Santa Fe University of Art and Design. He had a passion for cooking and attended the Institute of Culinary Education, which was established by Peter Kump. While there, Alevras had served as a chef for restaurants. was also a chef for a Canadian ambassador.

Alevras established his own restaurant, called The Tasting Room Restaurant, which he ran with his wife, Renee. In 2006 he and his wife moved to Elizabeth Street in Manhattan, New York. After moving, established another restaurant, which when reviewed by Frank Bruni received only a single star.

In the 2000s and 2010s, Alevras retired and had begun working at the Red Hook Winery. He died in October 2022, of glioblastoma at his home in Manhattan, New York, at the age of 51.
