= Mohamed Al-Sada =

Bahraini sailor

Personal information
- Nationality: Bahrain
- Born: 7 February 1957 (age 68)

Sport
- Sport: Sailing

Mohamed Al-Sada (born 7 February 1957) is a Bahraini sailor. He competed in the 1996 Summer Olympics.
