= Al Mustafa Riyadh =

Bahraini marathon runner (born 1975)

Personal information
- Nationality: Bahrain
- Born: 15 August 1975 (age 50) Morocco
- Height: 1.71 m (5 ft 7 in)
- Weight: 64 kg (141 lb)

Sport
- Sport: Athletics
- Event: Marathon

Achievements and titles
- Personal best: Marathon: 2:11:41

Al Mustafa Riyadh (Arabic: رياض المصطفى; born August 5, 1975) is a Bahraini marathon runner of Moroccan origin. Riyadh represented Bahrain at the 2008 Summer Olympics in Beijing, where he competed for the men's marathon, along with his compatriots Abdulhak Zakaria, and Nasar Sakar Saeed. Unfortunately, he was unable to finish the entire race for the second time since he did the same fate at the 2004 Summer Olympics in Athens.

Riyadh also achieved his personal best time of 2:11:41, by winning the bronze medal at the 2008 Düsseldorf Marathon.
