= Khaled Al-Sada =

Bahraini sailor

Personal information
- Nationality: Bahrain
- Born: 18 April 1967 (age 57)

Sport
- Sport: Sailing

Khaled Al-Sada (born 18 April 1967) is a Bahraini sailor. He competed in the 1996 Summer Olympics.
