= Essa al-Busmait =

Bahraini sailor

Personal information
- Nationality: Bahrain
- Born: 1 January 1956 (age 69)

Sport
- Sport: Sailing

Essa al-Busmait (born 1 January 1956) is a Bahraini sailor. He competed in the 1996 Summer Olympics.
