= Hasan Mirza =

Azerbaijani philologist (1927–2015)

- Born: Azerbaijani: Həsən İbrahim oğlu Mirzəyev; 26 November 1927; Kavushug, Armenian SSR
- Died: 25 February 2015 (aged 87); Baku, Azerbaijan
- Education: Azerbaijan State Pedagogical Institute
- Website: www.hasanmirza.az

Mirzayev Hasan İbrahim oglu (Hasan Mirza) (26 November 1927 – 25 February 2015) was an Azerbaijani philologist.

He was born in the village of Kavushug in Daralayaz (modern-day Vayots Dzor Province of Armenia). In 1948, Hasan left secondary school. In 1950, he graduated from Nakhchvan State Pedagogical Institute, in 1955 Azerbaijan State Pedagogical Institute, in 1977 Marksizm-Leninizm University with an honours diploma. In 1965, he defended his candidate and in 1987 his doctor dissertation on philology. In 1968, he received docent and in 1990 professor diplomas. He was a professor, doctor of philology, honoured scientist, head of the “ Chair of Modern Azerbaijan language” for 21 years.

He was a member of New Azerbaijan Party from 21 November 1992. He was elected to the Political Board in three sessions of the NAP. He is one of the “91”s Agsaggal. He was a member of Communist Party of the Soviet Union. He left this party on 24 January 1990, after the carnage of Black January (19-20 January). He was a member of the Trade Union Organization from 1948.

More than 260 mass media sources highly praised his social and public works. These books were appreciated by 120 candidates and on doctorship dissertation 39, on scientific abstracts by 34 specialists. More than 90 poets and poet natured people devoted 170 verses and 4 poems to the honour of Hasan Mirzayev’s life and activity. Their total volume is more than 6000 lines. All his life long activities he received more than 50 sympathetic reviews,(honorary decrees, honorary name, written congratulation and address) by different organizations. He is a secondary and high school excellency, Labour Veteran. He is also the member of Political Buro of the New Azerbaijan Party, member of Writers Union and Journalists. He was awarded “ Golden Pen", “Mass Media Honorary Prize”, on 26 November 2002, he was awarded “Order of Honour” by the national Leader Heydar Aliyev. On 3 October 2007, Hasan Mirza was awarded “Order of Honour” for his merit by President Ilham Aliyev. On 13 April 2009, he was awarded “Personal President Grant” by President Ilham Aliyev. He was elected an honorary citizen of Borchali region by Borchali society in 2009. On 16 April 2010, he was elected as a permanent member of European Academy in Hanover, Germany.

For a long time, he acted as a deputy of the Chairman of Republic Head Organization of the Agsaggallar Board (Aged People Board). He had been elected as a member of village Soviet in 1959, Baku City Soviet in 1990, the first session of Milli Majlis in 1998, second session of Milli Majlis in 2000. He had also been a member of the committee of education, ethics and toponomy of Milli Majlis. He was also a member of toponomy commission. In 1998, he made a pilgrimage to the saint Moslem city Mashed and in 2002 to Makkah.

He was married and had five children, ten grandchildren and one great-grandson.

Hasan Mirzayev died on 25 February 2015 in Baku and was buried in the second Honorary Alley.
