= Bahrain Olympic Committee =

National Olympic Committee

- Country: Bahrain
- [[|]]
- Code: BRN
- Created: 1978
- Recognized: 1979
- Continental Association: OCA
- Headquarters: Seef, Kingdom of Bahrain
- President: Sheikh Khalid bin Hamad Al Khalifa
- Secretary General: Faris Mustafa Al Kooheji
- Website: boc.bh

The Bahrain Olympic Committee (Arabic: اللجنة الأولمبية البحرينية, IOC code: BRN) is the National Olympic Committee representing Bahrain as a member of the International Olympic Committee. It was formed in 1978 and received official recognition in 1979. It is responsible for organizing Bahrain's participation in the Olympic Games.

== Handball ==
=== National teams ===
- Bahrain

=== Club teams ===
==== Asia ====
- (Bahrain) Al-Najma SC

== History ==
=== Foundation ===
The idea to establish the committee was finally fulfilled on 19 May 1979 as it became the official organization supervising sport activities in Bahrain and under the Supreme Council for Youth and Sports, which was founded in 1975, presided by the then Crown Prince King Hamad.

And following the constituent meeting on 19 May 1979, in the presence of representatives of nine sports associations – athletics, swimming, football, basketball, volleyball, handball, weightlifting, table tennis and shooting, the main system of the committee was formed and submitted to the Ministry of Labour and Social Affairs, which was then the supervising organization of the national clubs and the sports associations.

On 23 May 1979, just four days after the constituent meeting, the then Minister of Labour and Social Affairs officially announced the foundation of the Bahrain Olympic Committee and declared the first board of directors presided by Shaikh Isa bin Rashid Al Khalifa.

=== International competition ===
After being accepted as a National Olympic Committee member of the International Olympic Committee in July 1979, the Bahrain Olympic Committee started establishing a series of relations with Arab and continental nations. Late on, the Bahrain Olympic Committee joined the Arab Sports Games Federation and became a founding member of the Olympic Council of Asia, which was founded in November, 1982, as well as playing a major part in establishing the National Olympic Committee Union in August 1982. The Ninth Asian Games in New Delhi, in December 1982, marked Bahrain's maiden appearance on the continental level.

The 1984 Summer Olympics, officially known as the Games of the XXIII Olympiad, saw Bahrain compete for the first time on this level. Since then, Bahrain has been keen to participate in the Olympics and Asian Games, as well as on the Arab revel, with its maiden contributions being at the Sixth Arab Games in Rabat, in Morocco in September 1985. Bahrain reached high competitive standard, starting from the 2002 Asian Games in Busan, in South Korea, through to Doha Asian Games in 2006, the 2010 edition Games in Guangzhou, in China. In the 2004 and 2008 Olympics in Athens and Beijing, Bahrain took its first-ever Olympic gold medal in the men's 1,500m through Rashid Ramzi, which was subsequently withdrawn after the Bahrain athlete failed to pass doping tests.

=== Medals ===
- 17th Asian Games (Incheon, South Korea): Bahrain won 18 medals in total, 8 gold, 6 silver and 4 bronze.

From 1984 to 2015, in eight Olympic Games (only summer games, never winter), the BOC has entered 59 athletes (46 men, 13 women) in 7 sports (athletics, cycling, fencing, modern pentathlon, sailing, shooting, swimming.

The BOC also recruits promising athletes from foreign countries by them giving a Bahrain citizenship, and have them run under the Bahrain flag. Such was the case of Maryam Yusuf Jamal who was the first Bahraini athlete to win an Olympic medal, a bronze in the 1500m women's race, in the London 2012 Summer Olympics, and Yusuf Saad Kamel, Shitaye Eshete, Rashid Ramzi. At the 2008 Summer Olympics, Rashid Ramzi won the first ever medal for Bahrain at the Olympics – winning the 1500m gold medal, but his test came back positive for the banned blood-boosting substance CERA, his result did not stand, and he was excluded from the sport for two years after.

== Description ==
The Bahrain Olympic Committee is responsible for organizing Bahrain's participation in the Olympic Games. The Committee was founded in 1979 and re-registered according to the law No. (21) of the year 1989, issued on 26 June 1990 under No. (3) on the organization of clubs and associations in the field of youth and sports at the General Organization for Youth and Sports and has legal personality from the date of its registration publication in the Official Gazette.

The Bahrain Olympic Committee is an independent civil body with legal personality and is a member by the International Olympic Committee (IOC). It has all the rights and obligations set forth in the Olympic Charter.

Committees Associated With The BOC: Marketing Committee, Technical Committee, Women and Sport Committee, Sport and the Environment Committee.

== Board of directors ==
- President of the Board: Khalid bin Hamad Al Khalifa
- Vice-President: Isa bin Ali Al Khalifa
- General Secretary: Faris Mustafa Al Kooheji
- Board Members: Hayat bint A.aziz Al Khalifa
- Board Members: Hessa bint Khalid Al Khalifa
- Board Members: Hamad bin Rashid Al Khalifa
- Board Members: Noman Rashid Al Hassan
- Board Members: Abdulla Abdulraheem Abdulsalam
- Board Members: Ali Isa Eshaqi
- Board Members: Ali Abdulaziz Janahi
- Board Members: Faisal Khalid Kanoo
- Board Members: Hatem Abbas Dadabai
- Board Members: Mohammed Jassim Ghareeb

== See also ==
- Bahrain at the Olympics
- Nasser bin Hamad Al Khalifa
