= Soling European Championship results (1995–1999) =

Soling European Championships

Soling
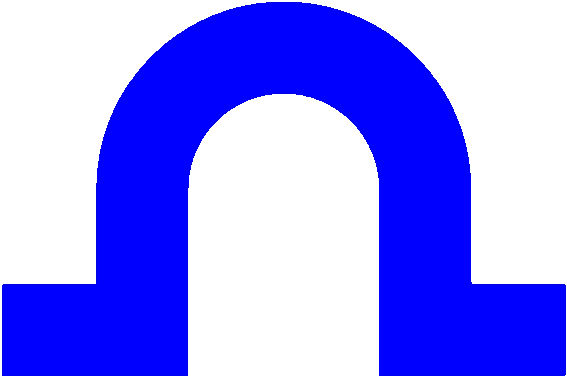

The main article describes all European Soling Championships from one the first held in 1968 to the announced Championships in the near future. This article states the detailed results, where relevant the controversies, and the progression of the Championship during the series race by race of the European Soling Championships in the years 1995, 1996, 1997, 1998 and 1999. This is based on the major sources: World Sailing, the world governing body for the sport of sailing recognized by the IOC and the IPC, and the publications of the International Soling Association. Unfortunately not all crew names are documented in the major sources.

== 1995 Final results ==
1995
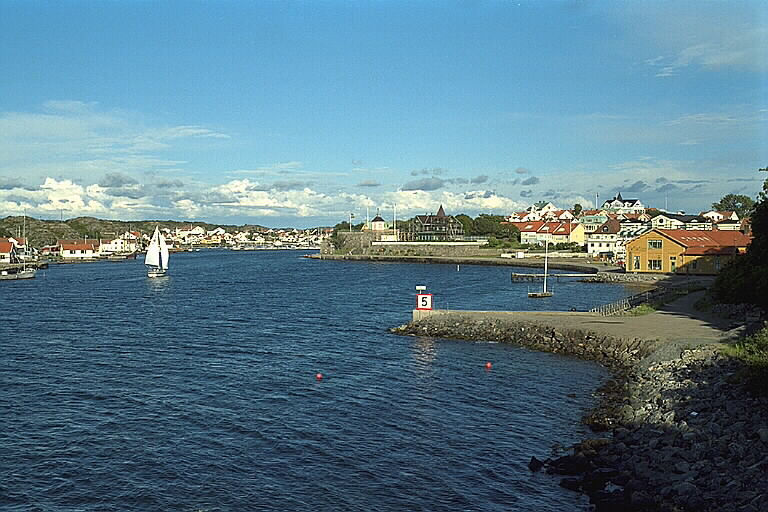

Event title
- Edition: 28
- Host: Royal Gothenburg Yacht Club

Event details
- Venue: Marstrand, Sweden
- Dates: 12–18 June 1995
- Yachts: 56

Competitors
- Competitors: 168
- Competing nations: 19

Results
- (gold) Gold: Denmark; Jesper Bank; Kræn Nielsen; Thomas Jacobsen
- (silver) Silver: Norway; Herman Horn Johannessen; Paul Davis; Espen Stokkeland
- (bronze) Bronze: Australia; Cameron Miles; James Mayjor; Chris Links

Rank	Country	Helmsman	Crew	Sail No.	Race 1		Race 2		Race 3		Race 4		Race 5		Race 6		Race 7		Total	Total – discard
Rank	Country	Helmsman	Crew	Sail No.	Pos.	Pts.	Pos.	Pts.	Pos.	Pts.	Pos.	Pts.	Pos.	Pts.	Pos.	Pts.	Pos.	Pts.	Total	Total – discard
1st place, gold medalist(s)	DEN	Jesper Bank	Kræn Nielsen; Thomas Jacobsen	DEN 117	~~18~~	~~24~~	4	8	7	13	2	3	1	0	8	14	1	0	62	38
2nd place, silver medalist(s)	NOR	Herman Horn Johannessen	Paul Davis; Espen Stokkeland	NOR 116	6	11.7	3	5.7	12	18	1	0	~~19~~	~~25~~	17	23	2	3	86.4	61.4
3rd place, bronze medalist(s)	AUS	Cameron Miles	James Mayjor; Chris Links	AUS 178	1	0	10	16	5	10	10	16	~~23~~	~~29~~	3	5.7	16	22	98.7	69.7
4	DEN	Stig Westergaard	Jens Bojsen-Møller; Jan Eli Andersen	DEN 111	5	10	12	18	4	8	5	10	4	8	~~18~~	~~24~~	12	18	96	72
5	DEN	Theis Palm	Henrik Vildenpeldt; Thomas Kristensen	DEN 110	~~23~~	~~29~~	5	10	18	24	4	8	2	3	6	11.7	13	19	104.7	75.7
6	SWE	Magnus Holmberg	Johan Barne; Björn Alm	SWE 135	~~27~~	~~33~~	2	3	1	0	8	14	16	22	11	17	17	23	112	79
7	RUS	Georgy Shayduko	Dmitry Shabanov; Igor Skalin	RUS 43	~~24~~	~~30~~	11	17	3	5.7	9	15	6	11.7	15	21	10	16	116.4	86.4
8	ESP	Luis Doreste	David Vera; Domingo Manrique	ESP 183	12	18	18	24	6	11.7	18	24	8	14	1	0	~~22~~	~~28~~	119.7	91.7
9	AUS	Ian Walker	Michael Peel; Noel Drennan	AUS 180	~~49~~	~~55~~	7	13	32	38	12	18	12	18	2	3	3	5.7	150.7	95.7
10	CAN	Hans Fogh	Thomas Fogh; Simon Van Wonderen	CAN 211	7	13	27	33	2	3	7	13	~~31~~	~~37~~	7	13	20	26	138	101
11	ITA	Mario Celon	Gianni Torboli; Claudio Celon	ITA 241	3	5.7	8	14	14	20	27	33	13	19	~~DNF~~	~~63~~	14	20	174.7	111.7
12	NED	Willem Potma	Frank Hettinga; Gerhard Potma	NED 31	15	21	16	22	11	17	10	16	3	5.7	24	30	~~29~~	~~35~~	146.7	111.7
13	AUT	Gustav Kuhn	Robert Steinkogler; Hannes Steinkogler	AUT 111	8	14	1	0	~~31~~	~~37~~	23	29	25	31	31	37	9	15	163	126
14	USA	Jeff Madrigali	Kent Massey; Jim Barton	USA 743	~~35~~	~~41~~	13	19	20	26	11	17	5	10	12	18	35	41	172	131
15	USA	Dave Curtis	Stuart Flinn; Philip Gow	USA 820	16	22	15	21	26	32	14	20	9	15	~~PMS~~	~~63~~	15	21	194	131
16	ESP	Manuel Doreste	Juan Pablo de Diego; Juan Galmés	ESP 146	36	42	6	11.7	9	15	~~38~~	~~44~~	22	28	10	16	21	27	183.7	139.7
17	FRA	Yves Loday	Neva; Audigane	FRA 182	2	3	25	31	~~36~~	~~42~~	33	39	11	17	16	22	27	33	187	145
18	SWE	Hans Wallén	Martin Westerdahl; Nicklas Fridén	SWE 155	20	26	21	27	8	14	25	31	36	42	5	10	~~PMS~~	~~63~~	213	150
19	CAN	Bill Abbott Jr.	Joanne Abbott; Brad Boston	CAN 1	13	19	28	34	17	23	15	21	~~38~~	~~44~~	9	15	36	42	198	154
20	FRA	Marc Bouet	Gildas Morvan; Sylvain Chtounder	FRA 1	~~DNF~~	~~63~~	22	28	16	22	32	38	17	23	27	33	8	14	221	158
21	NOR	Togersen	Christoffersen; Andr	NOR 114	26	32	14	20	24	30	24	30	10	16	25	31	~~32~~	~~38~~	197	159
22	AUT	Christian Binder	Christian Feichtinger; Volker Moser	AUT 114	9	15	20	26	39	45	~~43~~	~~49~~	7	13	32	38	19	25	211	162
23	USA	Judd Smith	Rodi; Pitcher	USA 821	~~PMS~~	~~63~~	24	30	29	35	13	19	28	34	23	29	11	17	227	164
24	IRL	Marshall King	Garrett Connolly; Dan O'Grady	IRL 2	19	25	29	35	21	27	30	36	~~32~~	~~38~~	29	35	4	8	204	166
25	SWE	Magnus Johansson	Nicklas Holm; Christian Strombald	SWE 140	17	23	17	23	23	29	31	37	20	26	30	36	~~DNF~~	~~63~~	237	174
26	GER	Albert Batzill	Peter Lang; Eddy Eich	GER 306	~~PMS~~	~~63~~	19	25	22	28	53	59	39	45	4	8	5	10	238	175
27	DEN	Mads Storgaard	Morten Storgaard; Storgaard	DEN 102	25	31	40	46	~~DNF~~	~~63~~	20	26	14	20	14	20	30	36	242	179
28	SWE	Bjorndal	Andersson; Nilsson	SWE 142	30	36	~~DSQ~~	~~63~~	10	16	3	5.7	44	50	26	32	38	44	246.7	183.7
29	CAN	Bruce Clifford	Robin Tattersall; Bruce Hitchner	CAN 212	10	16	38	44	34	40	16	22	33	39	~~41~~	~~47~~	26	32	240	193
30	HUN	György Wossala	László Kovácsi; Károly Vezér	HUN 77	~~39~~	~~45~~	9	15	37	43	22	28	29	35	36	42	28	34	242	197
31	AUT	Michael Luschan	Georg Stadler; Markus Schneeberger	AUT 101	42	48	43	49	15	21	21	27	~~PMS~~	~~63~~	19	25	25	31	264	201
32	JPN	Kazunori Komatsu	Masatoshi Hazama; Kazuyuki Hyodo	JPN 35	~~PMS~~	~~63~~	41	47	35	41	50	56	21	27	13	19	6	11.7	264.7	201.7
33	AUS	Matt Hayes	Barry Watson; Stephen McConaghy	AUS 174	29	35	48	54	19	25	6	11.7	18	24	~~DNF~~	~~63~~	PMS	63	275.7	212.7
34	GER	Heiko Winkler	Stefan Wenzel; Jens Niemann	GER 288	~~48~~	~~54~~	32	38	47	53	49	55	24	30	20	26	7	13	269	214
35	FIN	Eki Heinonen	Sami Tamminen; Harjula	FIN 53	37	43	33	39	30	36	~~39~~	~~45~~	30	36	22	28	31	37	264	219
36	USA	Peter Coleman	Paul Coleman; Kevin Kelley	USA 811	11	17	36	42	45	51	52	58	15	21	33	39	~~PMS~~	~~63~~	291	228
37	BLR	Oleg Spolon	Gennadiy Strakh; Morozov	BLR 1	33	39	39	45	27	33	19	25	41	47	~~PMS~~	~~63~~	34	40	292	229
38	HUN	G. Bankuty	Georgy Galantha; Szentiuanti	HUN 307	21	27	47	53	44	50	17	23	43	49	~~DSQ~~	~~63~~	23	29	294	231
39	SWE	Falkenberg	Jonson; Jonson	SWE 139	34	40	26	32	~~40~~	~~46~~	28	34	29	35	39	45	39	45	277	231
40	NED	Rudy den Outer	Leo Determan; Gert Kedde	NED 33	14	20	42	48	33	39	37	43	35	41	~~47~~	~~53~~	43	49	293	240
41	GER	Axel Mertens	Saurbier; Semmer	GER 296	32	38	~~DSQ~~	~~63~~	38	44	34	40	PMS	63	21	27	24	30	305	242
42	SWE	Unger	Strandell; Silfverhielm	SWE 1	~~50~~	~~56~~	50	56	43	49	35	41	27	33	35	41	18	24	300	244
43	SUI	Jan Eckert	Piet Eckert; Wim Eckert	SUI 276	46	52	23	29	13	19	42	48	~~PMS~~	~~63~~	34	40	DNF	63	314	251
44	CAN	Anderson	Christie; Smithers	CAN 213	28	34	44	50	28	34	29	35	~~PMS~~	~~63~~	40	46	PMS	63	325	262
45	RUS	Oleg Nabatov	Kaptukhin; Kulukin	RUS 42	4	8	51	57	49	55	51	57	40	46	37	43	~~DNF~~	~~63~~	329	266
46	HUN	Szabolcs Detre	Zsolt Detre; Szabolcs	HUN 107	~~47~~	~~53~~	34	40	48	54	44	50	37	43	28	34	40	46	320	266
47	FIN	Fellman	Ehrnrooth; Ehrnrooth	FIN 49	41	47	37	43	42	48	~~DNF~~	~~63~~	42	48	38	44	37	43	336	273
48	ITA	Ernesto Angeletti	Ferdinando Colaninno; Pierluigi Fornelli	ITA 245	~~DSQ~~	~~63~~	30	36	25	31	45	51	26	32	PMS	63	DNF	63	339	276
49	NED	Rien Segaar	Hans Zijlstra; Maarten Kat	NED 20	44	50	35	41	~~46~~	~~52~~	40	46	34	40	46	52	42	48	329	277
50	RSA	Sternagel	Bailes; Grunell	RSA 48	22	28	31	37	~~DSQ~~	~~63~~	46	52	50	56	50	56	44	50	342	279
51	ARG	Richard Grunsten	Ezra Culver; Gavin Flinn	ARG 27	43	49	52	58	~~54~~	~~60~~	36	42	46	52	43	49	33	39	349	289
52	USA	Charlie Kamps	Tim Murphy; Toby Kamps	USA 802	31	37	46	52	41	47	47	53	45	51	45	51	~~DNF~~	~~63~~	354	291
53	SWE	Farnum	Hoglind; Lindwall	SWE 118	45	51	49	55	~~52~~	~~58~~	26	32	47	53	44	50	45	51	350	292
54	NED	Bram Soethoudt	Jos Soethoudt; Ralph Genang	NED 24	40	46	45	51	~~50~~	~~56~~	41	47	49	55	49	55	46	52	362	306
55	FIN	Ahti Nurminen	Ville Villikka; Antti Laakso	FIN 50	38	44	53	59	53	59	~~DSQ~~	~~63~~	48	54	42	48	47	53	380	317
56	FIN	Ahman	Ahman; Heikkila	FIN 48	51	57	~~DNC~~	~~63~~	51	57	48	54	DNF	63	48	54	41	47	395	332

Legend: DNC – Did not come to the starting area; DNF – Did not finish; DNS – Did not start; DSQ – Disqualified; PMS – Premature start;
Discard is crossed out and does not count for the overall result.

- 1995 Progress

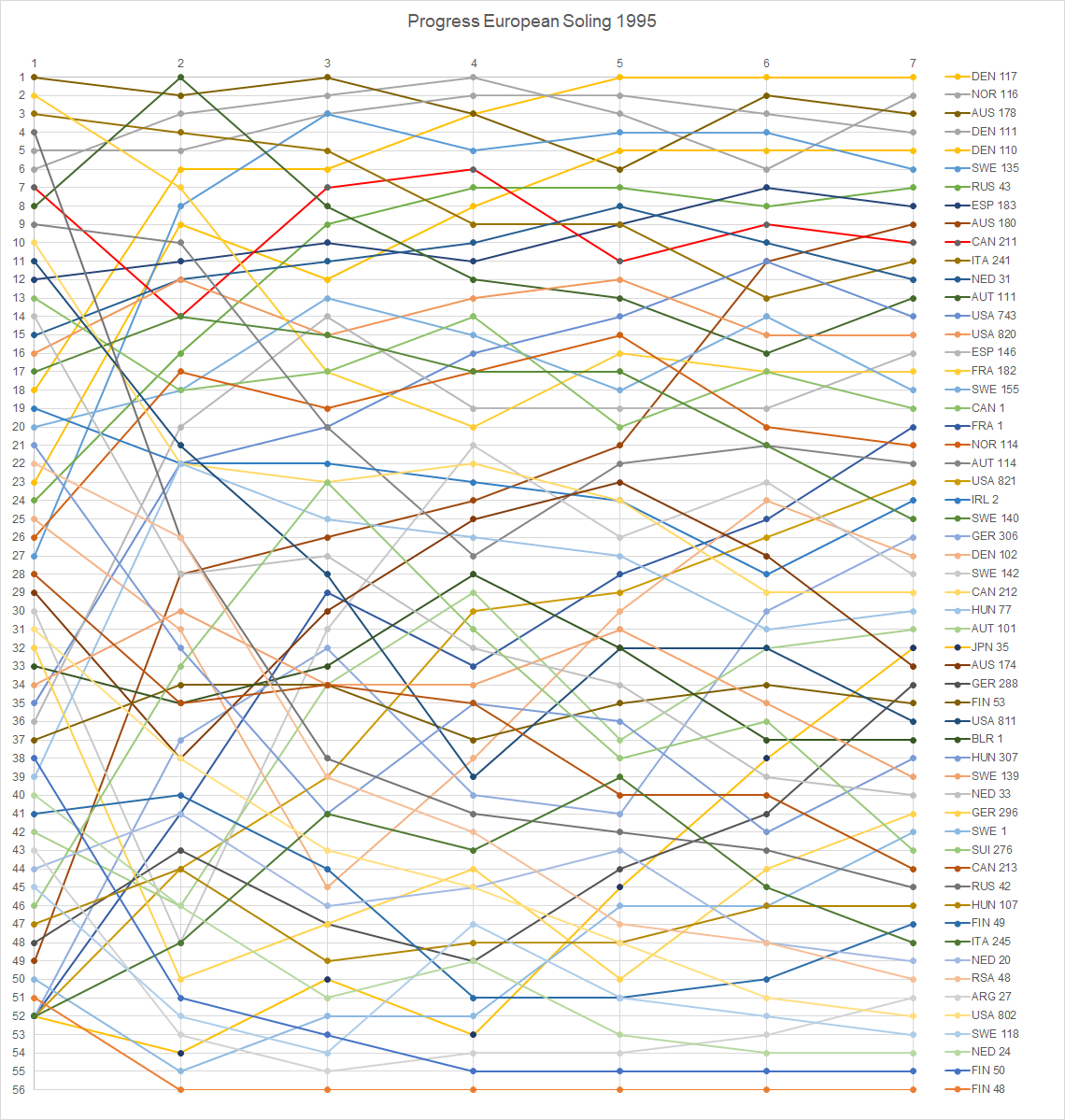

== 1996 Final results ==
1996

Event title
- Edition: 29
- Host: Balatonfüredi Yacht Club

Event details
- Venue: Balatonfüred, Hungary
- Dates: 19–27 September
- Yachts: 31
- Opening ceremony: 20 September

Competitors
- Competitors: 93
- Competing nations: 12

Results
- (gold) Gold: Ukraine; Serhiy Pichuhin; Serhiy Khaindrava; Volodymyr Korotkov
- (silver) Silver: Austria; Christian Binder; Franz Fellner; Volker Moser
- (bronze) Bronze: Hungary; György Wossala; László Kovácsi; Károly Vezér

Rank	Country	Helmsman	Crew	Sail No.	Race 1		Race 2		Race 3		Race 4		Race 5		Race 6		Total	Total – discard
Rank	Country	Helmsman	Crew	Sail No.	Pos.	Pts.	Pos.	Pts.	Pos.	Pts.	Pos.	Pts.	Pos.	Pts.	Pos.	Pts.	Total	Total – discard
1st place, gold medalist(s)	UKR	Serhiy Pichuhin	Serhiy Khaindrava; Volodymyr Korotkov	UKR 1	1	0	6	11.7	1	0	1	0	~~17~~	~~23~~	3	5.7	40.4	17.4
2nd place, silver medalist(s)	AUT	Christian Binder	Franz Fellner; Volker Moser	AUT 114	~~10~~	~~16~~	1	0	2	3	3	5.7	2	3	9	15	42.7	26.7
3rd place, bronze medalist(s)	HUN	György Wossala	László Kovácsi; Károly Vezér	HUN 77	3	5.7	4	8	4	8	2	3	4	8	~~7~~	~~13~~	45.7	32.7
4	DEN	Jesper Bendix	Jesper Baunsgaard; Jakob Gronsbach	DEN 113	2	3	5	10	3	5.7	5	10	~~8~~	~~14~~	5	10	52.7	38.7
5	SWE	Magnus Johansson	Nicklas Holm; Christian Strombald	SWE 140	9	15	2	3	5	10	6	11.7	~~12~~	~~18~~	1	0	57.7	39.7
6	HUN	Szabolcs Detre	Zsolt Detre; Péter Tímár	HUN 107	5	10	8	14	~~16~~	~~22~~	7	13	5	10	2	3	72	50
7	AUT	Christian Spießberger	Martin Kendler; Udo Moser	AUT 100	12	18	~~16~~	~~22~~	8	14	4	8	14	20	4	8	90	68
8	ITA	Camerlengo	Montresor; Carletto	ITA 232	13	19	3	5.7	7	13	18	24	~~DSQ~~	~~38~~	6	11.7	111.4	73.4
9	GER	Springer	Moschen; Przywarra	GER 283	11	17	~~17~~	~~23~~	6	11.7	10	16	7	13	10	16	96.7	73.7
10	GER	Heiko Winkler	Stefan Wenzel; Jens Niemann	GER 297	4	8	~~14~~	~~20~~	13	19	11	17	3	5.7	13	19	88.7	68.7
11	CRO	Bezic	Perovic; Jakovcic	CRO 1	14	20	7	13	9	15	8	14	~~18~~	~~24~~	8	14	100	76
12	NOR	Hans Olav Kvalvaag	Lars Horn Johannessen; Harald Blom-Bakke	NOR 123	7	13	9	15	10	16	~~12~~	~~18~~	10	16	11	17	95	77
13	HUN	Stefan Yibor	A. Dancs; Z. Sabian	HUN 290	16	22	11	17	14	20	~~19~~	~~25~~	3	5.7	15	21	110.7	85.7
14	HUN	G. Bankuty	Kales; Georgy Galantha	HUN 307	6	11.7	~~20~~	~~26~~	15	21	13	19	9	15	16	22	114.7	88.7
15	SWE	Oljeund	Jonson; Staffan Lindberg	SWE 139	15	21	~~24~~	~~30~~	12	18	9	15	11	17	19	25	126	96
16	GER	Schutt	Holger Weichert; Wagner	GER 284	~~26~~	~~32~~	18	24	11	17	14	20	16	22	14	20	135	103
17	HUN	Turi	Kruss; Szollosy	HUN 7	8	14	10	16	~~DNF~~	~~38~~	22	28	19	25	17	23	144	106
18	HUN	Madarasz	Hainzmann; Csomai	HUN 17	19	25	13	19	2.1	3	16	22	20	26	~~26~~	~~32~~	127	95
19	AUT	Franz Wageneder	Georg Zeileis; Florian Linko	AUT 116	18	24	15	21	20	26	15	21	~~22~~	~~28~~	21	27	147	119
20	HUN	Tibor Országh	Ferenc Borbély; Sándor Kulcsár	HUN 777	22	28	~~DSQ~~	~~38~~	27	33	27	33	1	0	23	29	161	123
21	NED	Bram Soethoudt	Ralph Genang; Jos Soethoudt	NED 24	~~25~~	~~31~~	21	27	17	23	21	27	13	19	24	30	157	126
22	HUN	T. Tusnai	J. Agost; Szabo	HUN 71	17	23	19	25	~~25~~	~~31~~	23	29	21	27	18	24	159	128
23	GER	Hugo Kriebel	Prinz lsmer	GER 257	24	30	~~26~~	~~32~~	23	29	17	23	15	21	22	28	163	131
24	NED	Rien Segaar	Robbert de Jong; Hans Zijlstra	NED 20	20	26	27	33	18	24	~~29~~	~~35~~	28	34	12	18	170	135
25	GER	Thomas Scherer	Andreas Baumüller; Jorg Goletz	GER 292	21	27	22	28	19	25	20	26	23	29	~~27~~	~~33~~	168	135
26	HUN	Muncz	Szilvassy; Ivan	HUN 111	28	34	12	18	22	28	26	32	27	33	~~29~~	~~35~~	180	145
27	HUN	Farkas Litkey	Balmaz Litkey; Gábor Kelecsényi	HUN 177	23	29	~~28~~	~~34~~	24	30	25	31	24	30	25	31	185	151
28	SVK	Peter Mosny	Andrej Holak; Holak	SVK 771	27	33	~~29~~	~~35~~	26	32	24	30	25	31	20	26	187	152
29	HUN	Kos-Tomas	Kalotai; Kos-Tomas	HUN 33	29	35	23	29	~~DNF~~	~~38~~	28	34	26	32	28	34	202	164
30	AUT	Bernhard Klingler	Ludwig Neuner; Johannes Egger	AUT 115	30	36	25	31	~~DNF~~	~~38~~	DNC	38	DNC	38	DNC	38	219	181
31	SLO	Bostjan Antoncic	Željko Planinšič; Mark Pleško	SLO 1	31	37	~~DSQ~~	~~38~~	DNC	38	30	36	29	35	30	36	220	182

Legend: DNC – Did not come to the starting area; DNF – Did not finish; DNS – Did not start; DSQ – Disqualified; PMS – Premature start;
Discard is crossed out and does not count for the overall result.

- 1996 Progress

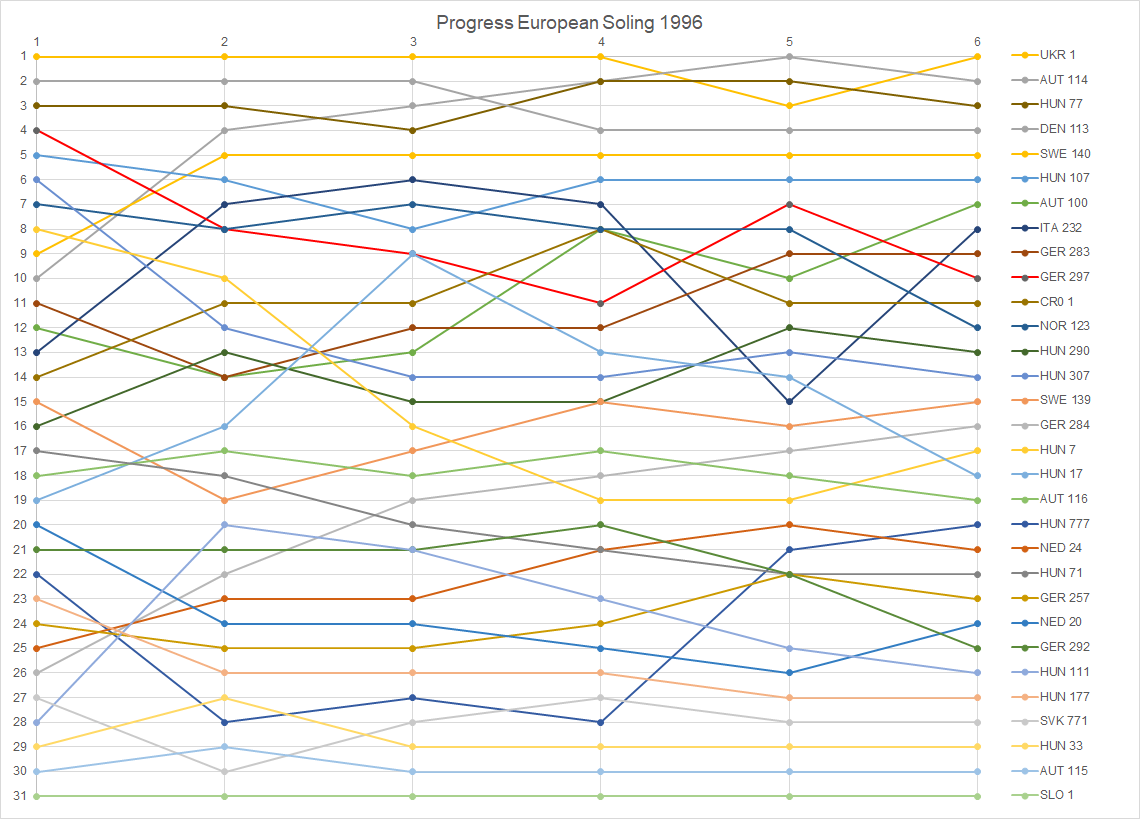

== 1997 Final results ==
1997
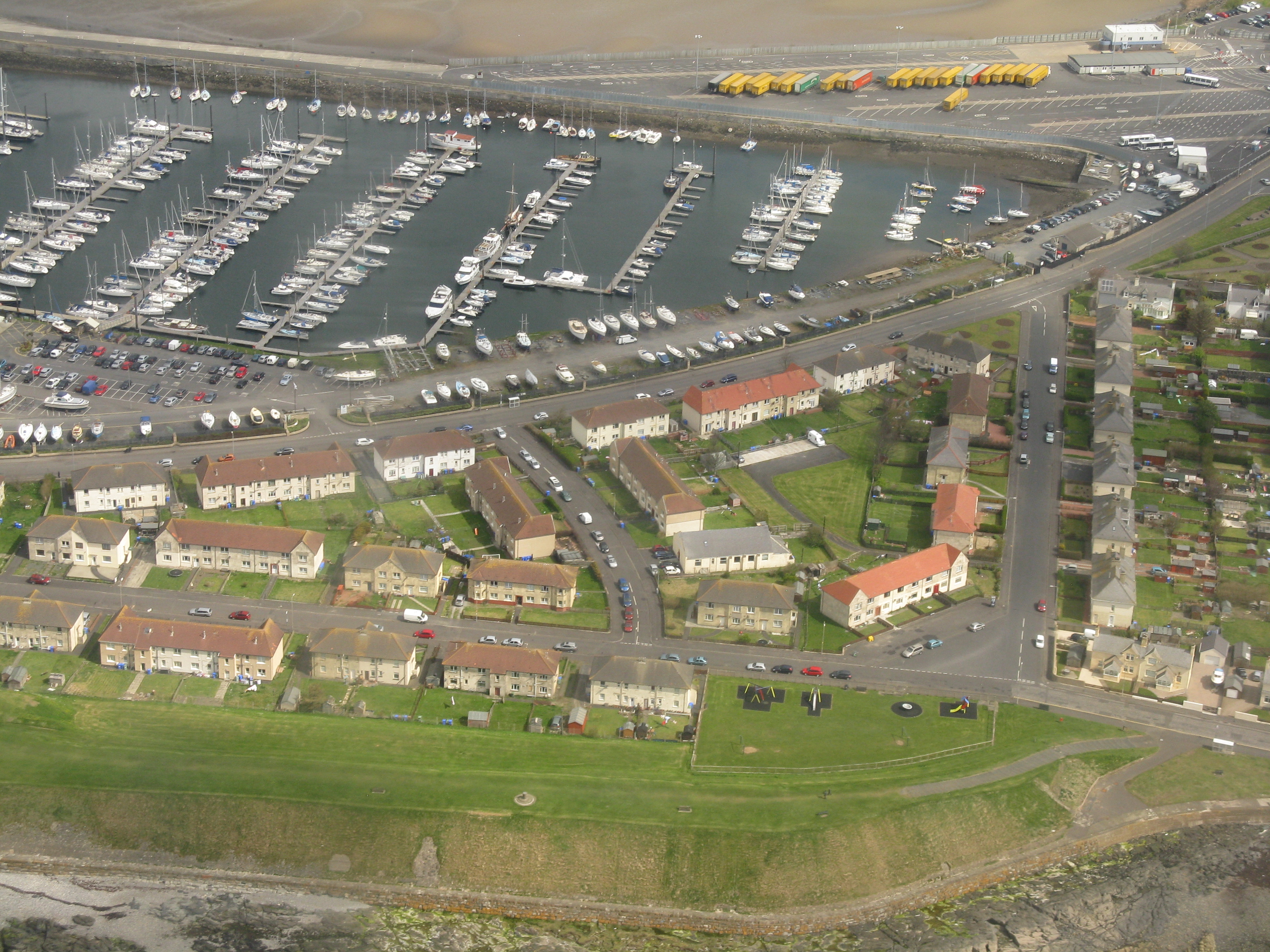

Event title
- Edition: 30
- Host: Troon Cruising Club

Event details
- Venue: Troon, United Kingdom
- Dates: 6–12 September
- Yachts: 37
- Opening ceremony: 6 September

Competitors
- Competitors: 111
- Competing nations: 13

Results
- (gold) Gold: Germany; Jochen Schümann; Gunnar Bahr; Ingo Borkowski
- (silver) Silver: United Kingdom; Andy Beadsworth; Barry Parkin; Chris Mason
- (bronze) Bronze: Norway; Herman Horn Johannessen; Paul Davis; Espen Stokkeland

Rank	Country	Helmsman	Crew	Sail No.	Race 1		Race 2		Race 3		Race 4		Race 5		Race 6		Total	Total – discard
Rank	Country	Helmsman	Crew	Sail No.	Pos.	Pts.	Pos.	Pts.	Pos.	Pts.	Pos.	Pts.	Pos.	Pts.	Pos.	Pts.	Total	Total – discard
1st place, gold medalist(s)	GER	Jochen Schümann	Gunnar Bahr; Ingo Borkowski	GER 307	1	1	1	1	1	1	1	1	~~5~~	~~5~~	1	1	10	5
2nd place, silver medalist(s)	GBR	Andy Beadsworth	Barry Parkin; Chris Mason	GBR 7	2	2	4	4	6	6	~~13~~	~~13~~	6	6	3	3	34	21
3rd place, bronze medalist(s)	NOR	Herman Horn Johannessen	Paul Davis; Espen Stokkeland	NOR 116	~~16~~	~~16~~	7	7	4	4	2	2	4	4	5	5	38	22
4	FRA	Philippe Presti	Pascal Rambeau; Jean-Marie Dauris	FRA 33	3	3	2	2	3	3	~~17~~	~~17~~	15	15	4	4	44	27
5	UKR	Serhiy Pichuhin	Volodymyr Korotkov; Dmitriy Yarmolenka	UKR 1	11	11	16	16	2	2	~~21~~	~~21~~	1	1	2	2	53	32
6	FIN	Jali Mäkilä	Eki Heinonen; Sami Tamminen	FIN 53	~~DSQ~~	~~38~~	3	3	7	7	5	5	11	11	6	6	70	32
7	NED	Willem Potma	Gerhard Potma; Sjirk Brouwer	NED 31	~~9~~	~~9~~	6	6	9	9	4	4	7	7	9	9	44	35
8	AUS	Nick Rogers	Stephan Jackson; Stephan Peel	AUS 180	13	13	~~DNF~~	~~38~~	10	10	3	3	2	2	8	8	74	36
9	ITA	Manuel Modena	Ferdinando Colaninno; Albino Fravezzi	ITA 240	~~20~~	~~20~~	10	10	8	8	6	6	3	3	13	13	60	40
10	DEN	Ramussen	Pedersen; Olesen	DEN 113	~~DSQ~~	~~38~~	5	5	5	5	15	15	9	9	6	6	78	40
11	AUT	Hans Spitzauer	Georg Stadler; Gerhard Scherzer	AUT 101	6	6	8	8	~~14~~	~~14~~	8	8	10	10	12	12	58	44
12	AUT	Christian Binder	Franz Fellner; Volker Moser	AUT 114	8	8	~~15~~	~~15~~	13	13	7	7	13	13	14	14	70	55
13	GER	Heiko Winkler	Stefan Wenzel; Jens Niemann	GER 297	~~DSQ~~	~~38~~	14	14	15	15	11	11	8	8	7	7	93	55
14	IRL	Marshall King	Bern; Nils Razmilovic	IRL 3	5	5	13	13	11	11	12	12	~~18~~	~~18~~	15	15	74	56
15	AUT	Gustav Kuhn	Dominik Würfel; Christian Scheinecker	AUT 111	4	4	11	11	~~22~~	~~22~~	10	10	16	16	17	17	80	58
16	AUT	Robert Steinkogler	N.N. Julian Jöbstl	AUT 4	~~DSQ~~	~~38~~	12	12	12	12	14	14	14	14	16	16	106	68
17	NOR	Hans Olav Kvalvaag	Lars Horn Johannessen; Harald Blom-Bakke	NOR 119	12	12	9	9	~~21~~	~~21~~	19	19	17	17	11	11	89	68
18	GBR	MacKay	Hall; Cameron	GBR 36	18	18	20	20	19	19	9	9	~~22~~	~~22~~	18	18	106	84
19	GER	Axel Mertens	Oehler; Pieper	GER 309	7	7	29	29	17	17	~~DNF~~	~~38~~	20	20	22	22	133	95
20	GBR	Fitzgerald	Matthew Percy; NN	GBR 157	14	14	19	19	24	24	~~DNF~~	~~38~~	23	23	20	20	138	100
21	GER	Roman Koch	Maxl Koch; Gregor Bornemann	GER 300	~~DSQ~~	~~38~~	17	17	18	18	18	18	21	21	28	28	140	102
22	NED	Rudy den Outer	Leo Determan; Johan Offermans	NED 33	10	10	25	25	16	16	~~29~~	~~29~~	27	27	24	24	131	102
23	GBR	Preston	Murray; Badman	GBR 164	17	17	18	18	~~DNF~~	~~38~~	16	16	29	29	23	23	141	103
24	ITA	Andrea Racchelli	Enzo Bonini; Razzi Milano	ITA 223	21	21	28	28	23	23	~~DNS~~	~~38~~	12	12	21	21	143	105
25	GBR	Roy Manifold	David Manifold; Chris Ball	GBR 160	19	19	24	24	~~26~~	~~26~~	20	20	26	26	19	19	134	108
26	GBR	George Barker	Roger Winward; Hansen	GBR 147	15	15	27	27	20	20	23	23	24	24	~~27~~	~~27~~	136	109
27	USA	Stuart H. Walker	Knight; Rotblad	USA 842	~~DSQ~~	~~38~~	21	21	27	27	25	25	19	19	26	26	156	118
28	AUT	Markus Schneeberger	Harry Vettermann; Franz Panek	AUT 73	~~DSQ~~	~~38~~	22	22	25	25	24	24	25	25	25	25	159	121
29	GBR	Gary Richardson	David Fish; Karl Sloane	GBR155	23	23	23	23	29	29	31	31	31	31	~~32~~	~~32~~	169	137
30	GBR	Basil Fountain	Alvarez; Charlton	GBR 131	24	24	30	30	30	30	22	22	32	32	~~33~~	~~33~~	171	138
31	GBR	Wilkinson	Cunliffe; Lee	GBR 5	22	22	~~DNF~~	~~38~~	28	28	28	28	30	30	30	30	176	138
32	GBR	Hamish Loudon	Assur; Loudon	GBR 141	~~DNS~~	~~38~~	31	31	33	33	27	27	28	28	29	29	186	148
33	GBR	Dogson	Borno; Robertson	GBR 163	~~DSQ~~	~~38~~	31	31	33	33	27	27	28	28	29	29	186	148
34	GER	Herbert Balzer	Werner Wilke; Gerd Auserwald	GER 303	26	26	33	33	~~34~~	~~34~~	32	32	34	34	34	34	193	159
35	GBR	Peter Smith	Demian Smith; Rob Bottomley	GBR 126	25	25	35	35	35	35	30	30	~~36~~	~~36~~	35	35	196	160
36	GBR	John Jamieson	John McLaren; Duncan Fraser	GBR 159	~~DSQ~~	~~38~~	32	32	32	32	33	33	35	35	36	36	206	168
37	GBR	Douthwaite	Jarvis; McGregor	GBR 112	~~DSQ~~	~~38~~	DNF	38	DNF	38	DNS	38	RET	38	DNF	38	228	190

Legend: DNC – Did not come to the starting area; DNF – Did not finish; DNS – Did not start; DSQ – Disqualified; PMS – Premature start;
Discard is crossed out and does not count for the overall result.

- 1997 Progress

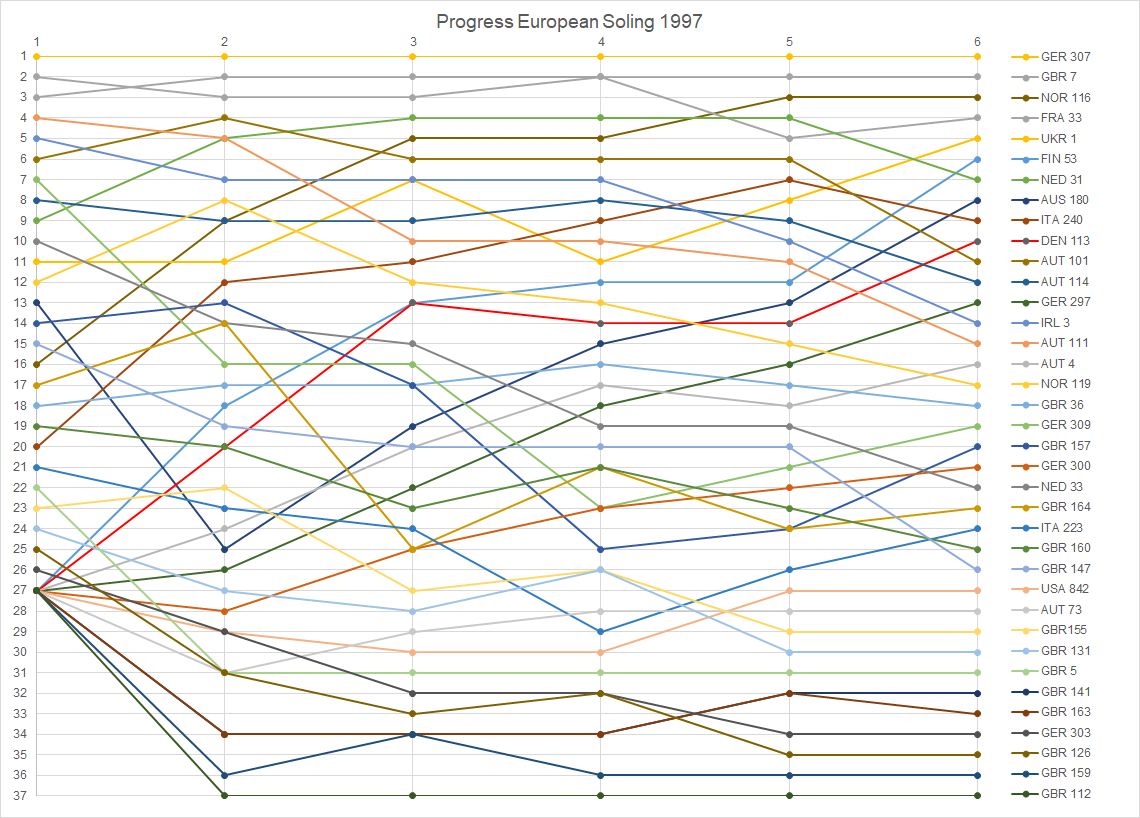

== 1998 Final results ==
1998
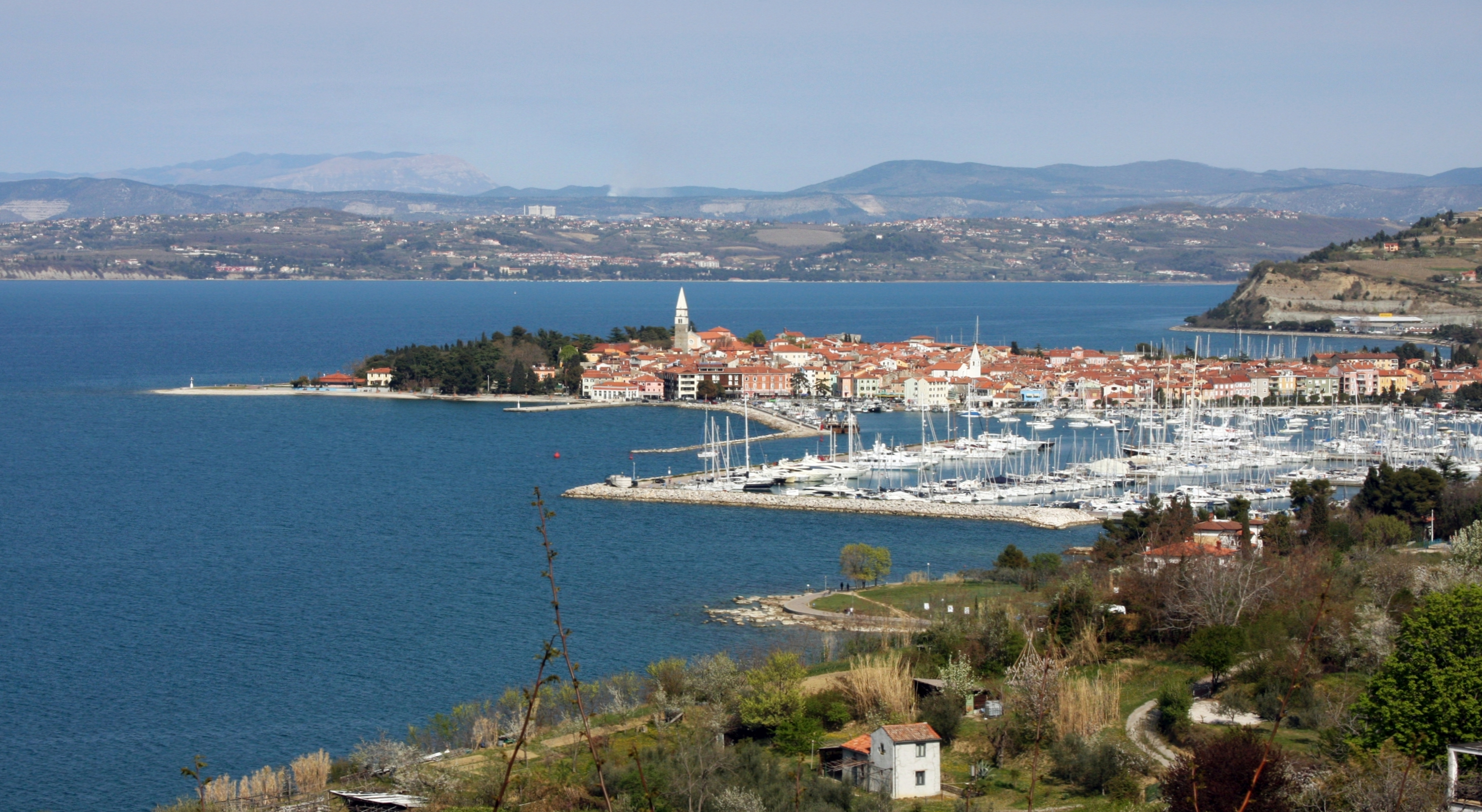

Event title
- Edition: 31
- Host: Jadralni Klub Burja Izola

Event details
- Venue: Izola, Slovenia
- Dates: 4–11 June
- Yachts: 51
- Key people: David Antončič
- Opening ceremony: 4 June

Competitors
- Competitors: 153
- Competing nations: 21

Results
- (gold) Gold: Ukraine; Serhiy Pichuhin; Volodymyr Korotkov; Serhiy Timokhov
- (silver) Silver: Russia; Georgy Shayduko; Sergey Voltshkov; S. Kramskoy
- (bronze) Bronze: Germany; Jochen Schümann; Gunnar Bahr; Ingo Borkowski

Rank	Country	Helmsman	Crew	Sail No.	Race 1		Race 2		Race 3		Race 4		Race 5		Race 6		Race 7		Race 8		Total	Total – discard
Rank	Country	Helmsman	Crew	Sail No.	Pos.	Pts.	Pos.	Pts.	Pos.	Pts.	Pos.	Pts.	Pos.	Pts.	Pos.	Pts.	Pos.	Pts.	Pos.	Pts.	Total	Total – discard
1st place, gold medalist(s)	UKR	Serhiy Pichuhin	Volodymyr Korotkov; Serhiy Timokhov	UKR 1	10	10	1	1	2	2	4	4	2	2	12	12	1	1	~~15~~	~~15~~	47	32
2nd place, silver medalist(s)	RUS	Georgy Shayduko	Sergey Voltshkov; S. Kramskoy	RUS 44	1	1	19	19	~~OCS~~	~~52~~	5	5	10	10	2	2	12	12	1	1	102	50
3rd place, bronze medalist(s)	GER	Jochen Schümann	Gunnar Bahr; Ingo Borkowski	GER 33	11	11	13	13	1	1	~~OCS~~	~~52~~	9	9	9	9	3	3	6	6	104	52
4	ITA	Paola Cian	Ferdinando Colaninno; Pierluigi Fornelli	ITA 2	7	7	6	6	7	7	~~15~~	~~15~~	15	15	5	5	6	6	8	8	69	54
5	FRA	Philippe Presti	Pascal Rambeau; Jean-Marie Dauris	FRA 33	9	9	9	9	~~31~~	~~31~~	12	12	6	6	1	1	13	13	11	11	92	61
6	FIN	Jali Mäkilä	Eki Heinonen; Sami Tamminen	FIN 53	2	2	2	2	13	13	13	13	~~27~~	~~27~~	4	4	20	20	14	14	95	68
7	ITA	Mario Celon	A. Sommariva; Claudio Celon	ITA 248	14	14	4	4	19	19	7	7	20	20	3	3	~~35~~	~~35~~	2	2	104	69
8	ITA	Nicola Celon	Daniele De Luca; A. Daverio	ITA 241	~~18~~	~~18~~	11	11	15	15	3	3	8	8	10	10	4	4	18	18	87	69
9	DEN	Stig Westergaard	Jens Bojsen-Møller; Bjørn Westergaard	DEN 120	5	5	26	26	11	11	1	1	16	16	~~DSQ~~	~~52~~	7	7	7	7	125	73
10	GER	Heiko Winkler	Stefan Wenzel; Jens Niemann	GER 297	22	22	~~38~~	~~38~~	4	4	8	8	1	1	18	18	17	17	4	4	112	74
11	NED	Roy Heiner	Peter van Niekerk; Dirk de Ridder	NED 35	25	25	5	5	23	23	2	2	3	3	11	11	9	9	~~31~~	~~31~~	109	78
12	AUT	Christian Binder	Franz Fellner; Volker Moser	AUT 124	4	4	3	3	22	22	23	23	7	7	17	17	~~30~~	~~30~~	10	10	116	86
13	GRE	Stavros Alevras	Panagiotis Alevras; D. Boukus	GRE 25	6	6	17	17	14	14	11	11	~~22~~	~~22~~	6	6	15	15	17	17	108	86
14	AUT	Hans Spitzauer	Andreas Hanakamp; Thomas Jakobowitz	AUT 123	12	12	12	12	20	20	9	9	18	18	7	7	14	14	~~21~~	~~21~~	113	92
15	GBR	Andy Beadsworth	Barry Parkin; Richard Sydenham	GBR 7	28	28	10	10	8	8	17	17	12	12	~~OCS~~	~~52~~	5	5	19	19	151	99
16	AUS	Neville Wittey	Josh Grace; David Edwards	AUS 181	3	3	29	29	16	16	~~DSQ~~	~~52~~	30	30	13	13	11	11	3	3	157	105
17	NOR	Hans Olav Kvalvaag	Harald Blom-Bakke; Lars Horn Johannessen	NOR 119	~~33~~	~~33~~	15	15	9	9	6	6	21	21	24	24	16	16	16	16	140	107
18	AUT	Hubert Raudaschl	Dominik Würfel; F. Dierwin	AUT 127	8	8	8	8	21	21	20	20	~~28~~	~~28~~	21	21	23	23	12	12	141	113
19	HUN	György Wossala	Károly Vezér; G. Bankuty	HUN 77	15	15	~~32~~	~~32~~	5	5	14	14	25	25	25	25	18	18	20	20	154	122
20	NED	Harmen Donker	Sjirk Brouwer; Marcel de Jong	NED 26	24	24	14	14	24	24	19	19	~~36~~	~~36~~	8	8	8	8	33	33	166	130
21	GER	Roman Koch	Maxl Koch; T. Meyer	GER 300	29	29	34	34	18	18	18	18	11	11	20	20	2	2	~~RET~~	~~52~~	184	132
22	SLO	Boštjan Antončič	Andrej Borštnar; Gennadiy Strakh	SLO 1	20	20	18	18	12	12	~~RET~~	~~52~~	19	19	30	30	33	33	9	9	193	141
23	AUS	Nick Rodgers	Stephan Jackson; Noel Drennan	AUS 180	23	23	31	31	3	3	26	26	17	17	14	14	29	29	~~44~~	~~44~~	187	143
24	ITA	Enrico Chieffi	Luca Bontempelli; Flavio Grassi	ITA 247	17	17	24	24	~~OCS~~	~~52~~	16	16	4	4	OCS	52	10	10	23	23	198	146
25	AUT	Carl Auteried Jr.	Thomas Beclin; Martin Kendler	AUT 117	34	34	7	7	33	33	25	25	5	5	27	27	27	27	~~35~~	~~35~~	193	158
26	ITA	Andrea Racchelli	Enzo Bonini; Massimiliano Ferrari	ITA 223	~~35~~	~~35~~	25	25	6	6	35	35	14	14	23	23	28	28	27	27	193	158
27	FIN	Staffan Lindberg	Thomas Hallberg; Manni Borg	FIN 51	16	16	28	28	27	27	22	22	~~33~~	~~33~~	15	15	22	22	28	28	191	158
28	GER	Axel Mertens	Oechler; Mueller	GER 309	13	13	22	22	~~OCS~~	~~52~~	10	10	31	31	31	31	44	44	30	30	233	181
29	JPN	Kosun Kuramichi	T. Sasaki; R. Hagebols	JPN 36	~~DSQ~~	~~52~~	16	16	10	10	21	21	13	13	41	41	DNC	52	29	29	234	182
30	GER	Christof Weiland	T. Büdel; P. Weiland	GER 298	37	37	~~41~~	~~41~~	40	40	24	24	24	24	29	29	25	25	5	5	225	184
31	NED	Rudy den Outer	Ronald den Arend; Mark den Hoed	NED 33	27	27	23	23	34	34	30	30	~~40~~	~~40~~	28	28	21	21	24	24	227	187
32	GBR	Andy Green	C. Muray; J. Turner	GBR 164	~~41~~	~~41~~	35	35	17	17	29	29	29	29	16	16	31	31	RET	52	250	198
33	FRA	Pierre-Alexis Ponsot	Jean-Philippe Saliou; F. Morin	FRA 1	30	30	39	39	28	28	31	31	23	23	19	19	34	34	~~41~~	~~41~~	245	204
34	GBR	George Barker	Roger Winward; Gary Richardson	GBR 147	35	35	37	37	29	29	32	32	34	34	~~OCS~~	~~52~~	19	19	22	22	260	208
35	HUN	Stefan Yibor	A. Dancs; Z. Sabian	HUN 290	26	26	~~42~~	~~42~~	37	37	34	34	26	26	34	34	32	32	26	26	257	215
36	PAK	Khalid Akhtar	J. Rasool; A. Majid	PAK 1	32	32	27	27	30	30	39	39	35	35	26	26	26	26	~~DNC~~	~~52~~	267	215
37	AUT	Markus Schneeberger	Florian Schneeberger; Franz Panek	AUT 73	31	31	33	33	38	38	~~44~~	~~44~~	32	32	33	33	24	24	34	34	269	225
38	USA	Stuart H. Walker	R.S. Walker; Joe van Gieson	USA 842	21	21	40	40	32	32	38	38	~~47~~	~~47~~	32	32	38	38	25	25	273	226
39	IRL	Mark Dolan	Shawn Collins; Jeff Condell	IRL 4	19	19	36	36	25	25	40	40	38	38	22	22	~~DNC~~	~~52~~	DNC	52	284	232
40	GER	Günter Baumüller	Thomas Scherer; Andreas Baumüller	GER 292	36	36	21	21	42	42	27	27	37	37	35	35	36	36	~~42~~	~~42~~	276	234
41	CZE	Láznička Miloš	Zbyněk Zanker; Jiří Sovina	CZE 1	40	40	43	43	39	39	26	26	~~41~~	~~41~~	37	37	39	39	13	13	278	235
42	AUT	Franz Wageneder	Georg Zeileis; Rudolf Rager	AUT 116	~~OCS~~	~~52~~	30	30	26	26	33	33	39	39	36	36	37	37	37	37	290	238
43	GRE	Davourus Panagiotis	C. Glaridis; E. Glaridid	GRE 29	43	43	20	20	43	43	36	36	45	45	~~RET~~	~~52~~	42	42	39	39	320	268
44	GBR	Roy Manifold	David Manifold; McCurrie	GBR 160	42	42	47	47	35	35	43	43	43	43	38	38	41	41	~~DNC~~	~~52~~	341	289
45	GER	Hugo Kriebel	L. Matuszewski; K. Witt	GER 296	44	44	~~48~~	~~48~~	36	36	42	42	42	42	43	43	40	40	46	46	341	293
46	GER	Gerhard Lwowski	Manfred Mittermeier; Rainer Hofelich	GER 249	39	39	~~50~~	~~50~~	45	45	37	37	44	44	45	45	45	45	43	43	348	298
47	CRO	Vrscaj Bojan	Davor Bumbak; I. Novak	CRO 2	45	45	44	44	41	41	~~OCS~~	~~52~~	50	50	40	40	47	47	32	32	351	299
48	GER	Heino von Schuckmann	C. Spoerk; Harald Voit	GER 228	46	46	46	46	47	47	41	41	~~49~~	~~49~~	39	39	43	43	38	38	349	300
49	SLO	David Antončič	Željko Planinšič; Mark Pleško	SLO 11	48	48	49	49	46	46	46	46	~~51~~	~~51~~	42	42	48	48	36	36	366	315
50	AUT	Bernhard Klingler	Ludwig Neuner; Johannes Egger	AUT 115	47	47	51	51	44	44	47	47	46	46	~~RET~~	~~52~~	46	46	40	40	373	321
51	GER	Herbert Baltzer	Gerd Auerswald; J.M. Schwer	GER 303	~~OCS~~	~~52~~	45	45	48	48	44	44	48	48	44	44	49	49	45	45	375	323

- 1998 Progress

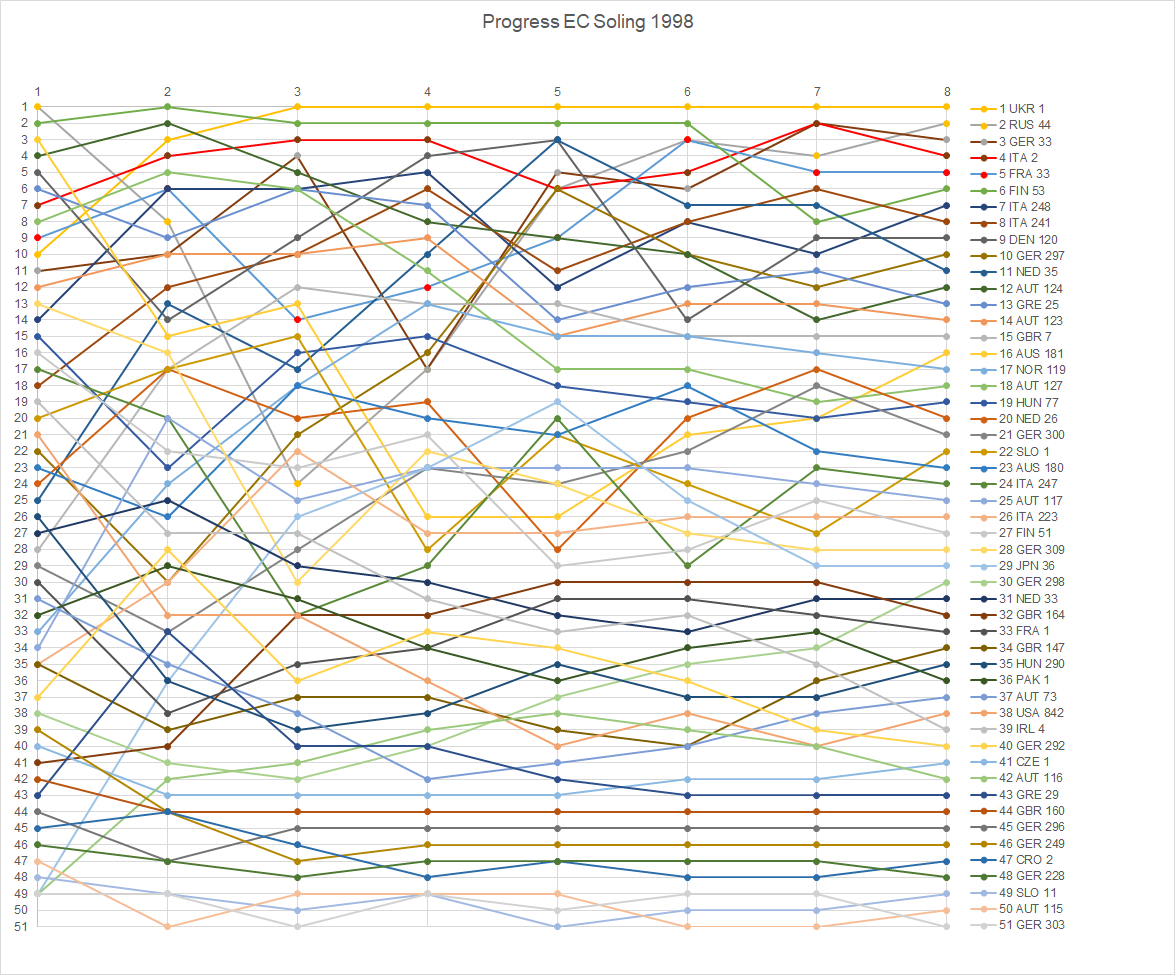

== 1999 Final results ==
1999
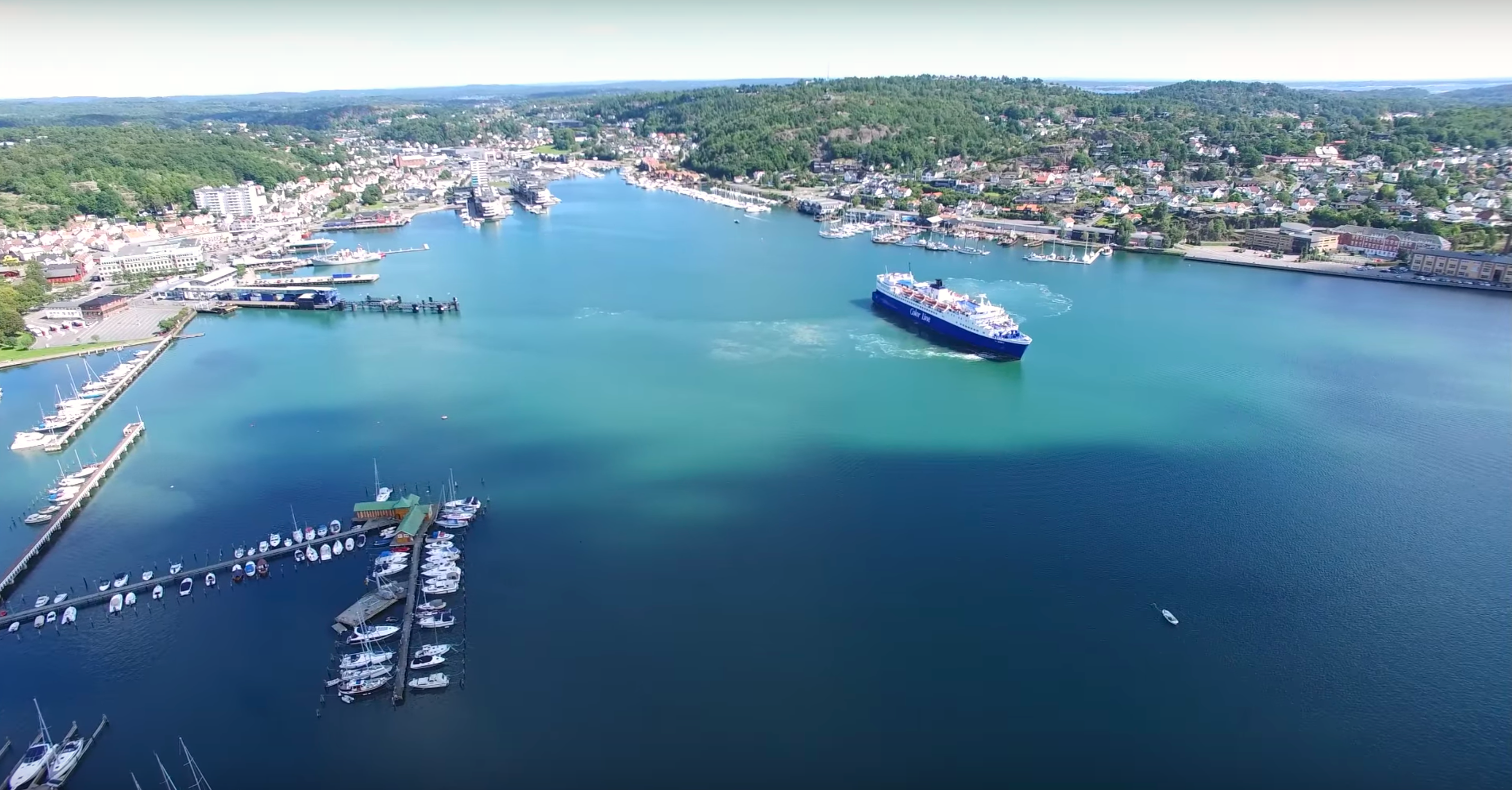

Event title
- Edition: 32
- Host: Sandefjord Seilforening

Event details
- Venue: Sandefjord, Norway
- Dates: 24 July – 1 August
- Yachts: 47
- Opening ceremony: 25 July

Competitors
- Competitors: 141
- Competing nations: 18

Results
- (gold) Gold: Netherlands; Roy Heiner; Peter van Niekerk; Dirk de Ridder
- (silver) Silver: Ukraine; Serhiy Pichuhin; Volodymyr Korotkov; Serhiy Timokhov
- (bronze) Bronze: Germany; Jochen Schümann; Gunnar Bahr; Ingo Borkowski

Rank	Country	Helmsman	Crew	Sail No.	Race 1		Race 2		Race 3		Race 4		Race 5		Race 6		Race 7		Race 8		Race 9		Total	Total – discard
Rank	Country	Helmsman	Crew	Sail No.	Pos.	Pts.	Pos.	Pts.	Pos.	Pts.	Pos.	Pts.	Pos.	Pts.	Pos.	Pts.	Pos.	Pts.	Pos.	Pts.	Pos.	Pts.	Total	Total – discard
1st place, gold medalist(s)	NED	Roy Heiner	Peter van Niekerk; Dirk de Ridder	NED 35	3	3	1	1	8	8	6	6	~~DSQ~~	~~48~~	1	1	1	1	1	1	1	1	70	22
2nd place, silver medalist(s)	UKR	Serhiy Pichuhin	Volodymyr Korotkov; Serhiy Timokhov	UKR 1	4	4	5	5	9	9	1	1	1	1	3	3	~~16~~	~~16~~	4	4	2	2	45	29
3rd place, bronze medalist(s)	GER	Jochen Schümann	Gunnar Bahr; Ingo Borkowski	GER 311	5	5	2	2	2	2	2	2	4	4	~~15~~	~~15~~	11	11	5	5	3	3	49	34
4	GBR	Andy Beadsworth	Barry Parkin; Richard Sydenham	GBR 7	10	10	8	8	1	1	4	4	3	3	2	2	4	4	7	7	~~12~~	~~12~~	51	39
5	ITA	Paolo Cian	Ferdinando Colaninno; Pierluigi Fornelli	ITA 239	8	8	9	9	6	6	10	10	2	2	8	8	2	2	3	3	~~11~~	~~11~~	59	48
6	NOR	Herman Horn Johannessen	Paul Davis; Espen Stokkeland	NOR 131	11	11	6	6	5	5	5	5	~~15~~	~~15~~	6	6	7	7	11	11	5	5	71	56
7	FRA	Philippe Presti	Pascal Rambeau; Jean-Marie Dauris	FRA 33	1	1	~~14~~	~~14~~	4	4	12	12	14	14	14	14	8	8	2	2	7	7	76	62
8	AUT	Hans Spitzauer	Andreas Hanakamp; Thomas Jakobowitz	AUT 123	2	2	~~19~~	~~19~~	3	3	9	9	11	11	11	11	18	18	9	9	8	8	90	71
9	CAN	Bill Abbott Jr.	Matt Abbott; Brad Boston	CAN 1	23	23	20	20	7	7	3	3	5	5	4	4	6	6	8	8	~~22~~	~~22~~	98	75
10	NOR	Kristian Nergaard	Christen Horn Johannessen; Peter Hauff	NOR 127	15	15	3	3	~~27~~	~~27~~	8	8	9	9	20	20	3	3	13	13	16	16	114	87
11	CAN	Hans Fogh	John Finch; Wolff	CAN 224	16	16	~~17~~	~~17~~	12	12	11	11	7	7	5	5	10	10	25	25	9	9	112	87
12	AUT	Christian Binder	Franz Fellner; Volker Moser	AUT 124	9	9	12	12	~~16~~	~~16~~	15	15	12	12	12	12	9	9	15	15	6	6	106	90
13	ITA	Nicola Celon	Daniele De Luca; Michele Paoletti	ITA 241	7	7	4	4	14	14	16	16	8	8	7	7	21	21	19	19	DSQ	4	144	96
14	FIN	Staffan Lindberg	Thomas Hallberg; Manni Borg	FIN 51	19	19	13	13	10	10	7	7	17	17	19	19	14	14	18	18	~~DSQ~~	~~48~~	165	117
15	FIN	Jali Mäkilä	Eki Heinonen; Sami Tamminen	FIN 53	14	14	10	10	13	13	~~24~~	~~24~~	DND	48	21	21	12	12	6	6	10	10	158	134
16	ITA	Mario Celon	A. Sommariva; Claudio Celon	ITA 248	~~26~~	~~26~~	21	21	28	28	19	19	6	6	10	10	27	27	12	12	14	14	163	135
17	JPN	Kosun Kuramichi	T. Sasaki; R. Hagebols	JPN 36	21	21	24	24	21	21	27	27	16	16	9	9	5	5	~~33~~	~~33~~	15	15	171	138
18	NOR	Hans Olav Kvalvaag	Harald Blom-Bakke; Lars Horn Johannessen	NOR 128	13	13	16	16	~~26~~	~~26~~	13	13	20	20	24	24	13	13	23	23	17	17	165	139
19	HUN	György Wossala	Károly Vezér; László Kovácsi	HUN 77	17	17	11	11	17	17	21	21	~~DSQ~~	~~48~~	23	23	20	20	22	22	13	13	192	144
20	GBR	Ian Williams	Mark Nicholls; Andy Hemmings	GBR 162	12	12	~~27~~	~~27~~	25	25	26	26	18	18	16	16	26	26	20	20	4	4	174	147
21	BER	Adam Barbosa	Jones; Davis	BER 18	~~25~~	~~25~~	26	26	19	19	25	25	13	13	25	25	22	22	16	16	18	18	189	163
22	ITA	Andrea Racchelli	Enzo Bonini; Massimiliano Ferrari	ITA 252	22	22	28	28	31	31	14	14	10	10	17	17	24	24	26	26	~~DSQ~~	~~48~~	220	172
23	FRA	Pierre-Alexis Ponsot	Jean-Philippe Saliou; F. Morin	FRA 150	28	28	~~30~~	~~30~~	24	24	29	29	24	24	18	18	15	15	14	14	20	20	202	172
24	GER	Hendrik Witzmann	Markus Koy; Christof Wieland	GER 293	27	27	15	15	20	20	20	20	19	19	~~29~~	~~29~~	19	19	28	28	26	26	203	174
25	SLO	Boštjan Antončič	Gennadiy Strakh; Andrej Borštnar	SLO 1	24	24	7	7	~~39~~	~~39~~	22	22	22	22	27	27	33	33	34	34	23	23	231	192
26	ARG	Gustavo Warburg	Matias Collins; Maximo Smith	ARG 29	18	18	33	33	22	22	33	33	27	27	~~34~~	~~34~~	29	29	17	17	29	29	242	208
27	USA	John Gochberg	Enos; Peter Smith	USA 839	~~DNF~~	~~48~~	38	38	15	15	30	30	29	29	36	36	17	17	24	24	19	19	256	208
28	GER	Axel Martens	Oechler; Mueller	GER 309	30	30	18	18	26	26	17	17	~~DSQ~~	~~48~~	33	33	30	30	36	36	21	21	259	211
29	CZE	Láznička Miloš	Zbyněk Zanker; Jiří Sovina	CZE 1	33	33	22	22	30	30	28	28	25	25	28	28	~~42~~	~~42~~	21	21	27	27	256	214
30	NED	Rudy den Outer	Johan Offermans; Ronald den Arend	NED 33	29	29	25	25	29	29	~~35~~	~~35~~	23	23	31	31	25	25	27	27	25	25	249	214
31	USA	Charlie Kamps	Toby Kamps; Hans Meyer	USA 832	32	32	23	23	32	32	23	23	~~DSQ~~	~~48~~	13	13	32	32	37	37	24	24	264	216
32	BRA	Alan Adler	Marcelo Ferreira; Daniel Adler	BRA 68	6	6	31	31	18	18	18	18	~~DSQ~~	~~48~~	22	22	DNS	48	DNS	48	DNS	48	287	239
33	NOR	Richard Fikse	Nomen nescio	NOR 100	38	38	35	35	11	11	36	36	30	30	26	26	~~40~~	~~40~~	40	40	35	35	291	251
34	GBR	Gary Richardson	Karl Sloane; Stewart Lee	GBR 155	~~40~~	~~40~~	40	40	37	37	34	34	26	26	39	39	38	38	10	10	28	28	292	252
35	AUT	Bernhard Klingler	Ludwig Neuner; Johannes Egger	AUT 115	36	36	29	29	38	38	32	32	21	21	30	30	~~39~~	~~39~~	39	39	32	32	296	257
36	USA	John Ingalls	Nomen nescio	USA 829	31	31	36	36	34	34	~~DSQ~~	~~48~~	28	28	35	35	28	28	38	38	30	30	308	260
37	NOR	Arvid Rove	Bernt Ole Havnebakken; Idar Salvesen	NOR 122	34	34	32	32	35	35	31	31	~~DSQ~~	~~48~~	32	32	34	34	29	29	34	34	309	261
38	NED	Bram Soethoudt	Arno Roosendaal; Jeroen Lockefeer	NED 38	37	37	37	37	33	33	~~40~~	~~40~~	32	32	40	40	36	36	30	30	31	31	316	276
39	GBR	Tony Clare	Nomen nescio	GBR 147	35	35	39	39	41	41	37	37	~~DSQ~~	~~48~~	37	37	23	23	42	42	37	37	339	291
40	NOR	Ole Rod	Nomen nescio	NOR 114	39	39	44	44	43	43	39	39	31	31	~~DSQ~~	~~48~~	31	31	32	32	38	38	345	297
41	NED	Rien Segaar	Gabor Helmhoudt; Robbert de Jong	NED 34	41	41	~~43~~	~~43~~	40	40	38	38	33	33	38	38	37	37	41	41	33	33	344	301
42	NOR	Petter Knut Hansen	Nomen nescio	NOR 107	~~42~~	~~42~~	42	42	44	44	42	42	DND	48	41	41	41	41	31	31	36	36	367	323
43	GBR	Basil Fountain	Nomen nescio	GBR 62	43	43	~~DNS~~	~~48~~	DNS	48	44	44	34	34	43	43	35	35	43	43	40	40	378	330
44	NOR	Bernt Ole Christensen	Nomen nescio	NOR 118	~~DNF~~	~~48~~	41	41	42	42	41	41	DSQ	48	42	42	43	43	35	35	39	39	379	331
45	USA	Tony Rey	Tom Burnham; Dean Brenner	USA 831	20	20	~~DNS~~	~~48~~	DNS	48	DNS	48	DNS	48	DNS	48	DNS	48	DNS	48	DNS	48	404	356
46	NOR	Sven Kristiansen	Nomen nescio	NOR 116	~~DNF~~	~~48~~	34	34	36	36	DNS	48	DNS	48	DNS	48	DNS	48	DNS	48	DNS	48	406	358
47	NOR	Lars Fosterud	Thomas Bru; Jan Arvid	NOR 50	~~DNF~~	~~48~~	DNS	48	45	45	43	43	DND	48	44	44	DNS	48	44	44	41	41	409	361

- 1999 Progress

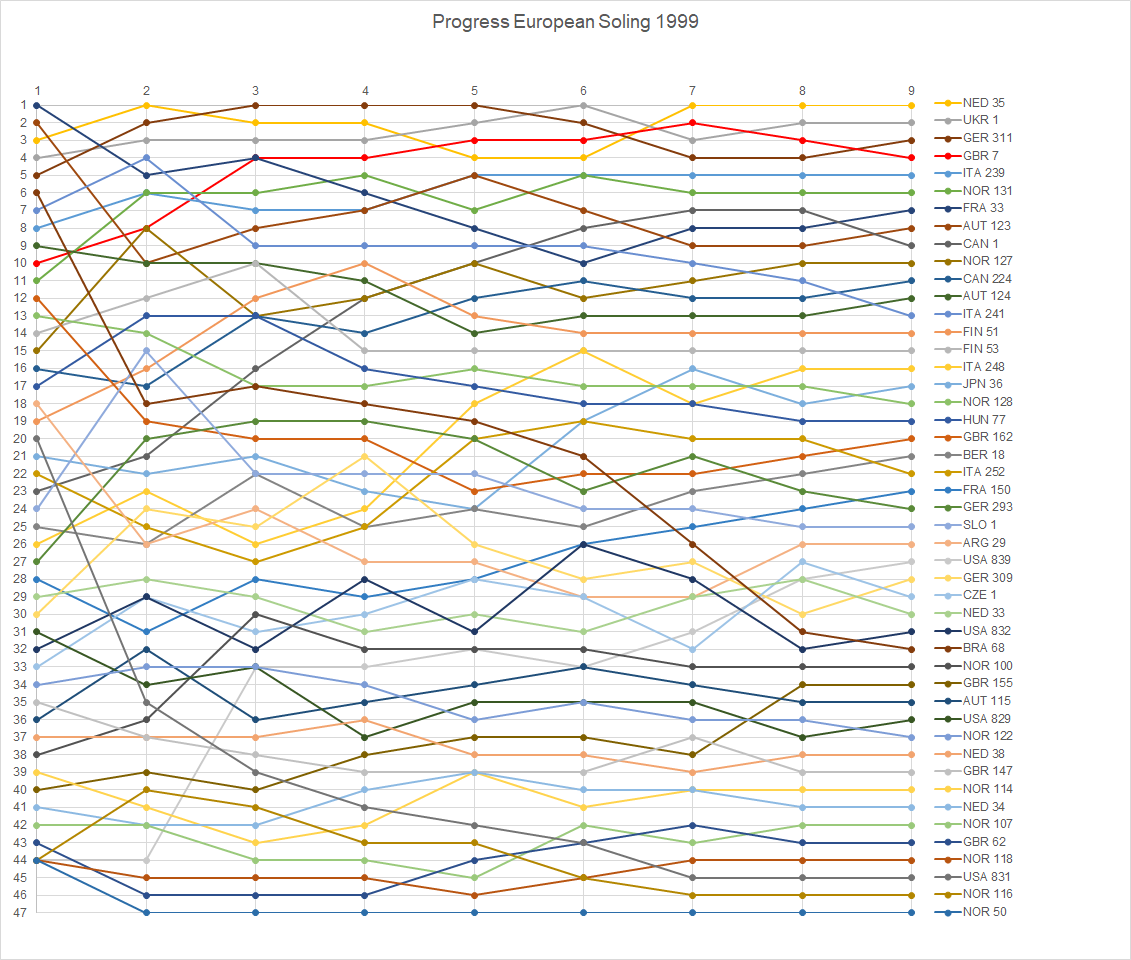

== Further results ==
For further results see:

- Soling European Championship results (1968–1979)
- Soling European Championship results (1980–1984)
- Soling European Championship results (1985–1989)
- Soling European Championship results (1990–1994)
- Soling European Championship results (1995–1999)
- Soling European Championship results (2000–2004)
- Soling European Championship results (2005–2009)
- Soling European Championship results (2010–2014)
- Soling European Championship results (2015–2019)
- Soling European Championship results (2020–2024)
