= 2001 Star World Championships =

The 2001 Star World Championships were held in Medemblik, Netherlands between August 2 and 12, 2001.

== Results ==
Results of individual races
Pos	Crew	Country	I	II	III	IV	V	VI	Tot	Pts
Gold medal	Fredrik Lööf (H); Christian Finnsgård	Sweden	2	31	5	15	2	3	58	27
Silver medal	Gavin Brady (H); George Iverson	New Zealand	4	9	7	36	7	1	64	28
Bronze medal	Vincent Brun (H); Mike Dorgan	United States	8	12	3	3	11	106; DNC	143	37
4	Torben Schmidt Grael (H); Marcelo Ferreira	Brazil	106; DSQ	27	2	1	1	9	146	40
5	Mark Neeleman (H); Jos Schrier	Netherlands	14	14	10	7	8	6	59	45
6	Mark Reynolds (H); Magnus Liljedahl	United States	1	44	1	37	17	4	104	60
7	Benny Andersen (H); Mogens Just	Denmark	5	35	12	25	4	20	101	66
8	José Maria van der Ploeg (H); Rafael Trujillo Villar	Spain	13	3	6	19	44	26	111	67
9	John A. MacCausland (H); Mark Strube	United States	6	20	8	24	106; RAF	18	182	76
10	Hans Spitzauer (H); Wolfgang Brenner	Austria	18	24	14	8	18	24	106	82
11	Mark Mansfield (H); Killian Collins	Ireland	10	15	19	106; DNF	26	14	190	84
12	Xavier Rohart (H); Yannick Adde	France	9	82	22	43	3	12	171	89
13	Nicola Celon (H); Edoardo Natucci	Italy	16	57	31	2	14	27	147	90
14	Afonso Domingos (H); Bernardo Santos	Portugal	26	38	51	5	12	11	143	92
15	Pietro D'Alì (H); Paolo Busolo	Italy	25	56	11	39	6	19	156	100
16	Roeland Wentholt (H); Hein Bart	Netherlands	23	30	25	82	10	22	192	110
17	Riccardo Simoneschi (H); Ferdinando Colaninno	Italy	12	106; DNF	17	59	16	10	220	114
18	Ian Walker (H); Nick Williams	Great Britain	20	80	40	35	9	13	197	117
19	George Szabo III (H); Darrell Hiatt	United States	28	17	21	46	30	21	163	117
20	Roberto Benamati (H); Andrea Gagliardi	Italy	22	64	20	42	5	29	182	118
21	Peter Vessella (H); Brian Fatih	United States	106; BFD	37	18	13	24	28	226	120
22	Christian Rasmussen (H); Peter Oersted	Denmark	7	69	4	12	29	106; BFD	227	121
23	Ben Mitchell (H); Rick Peters	United States	11	91	24	31	20	81	258	122
24	Marko Dahlberg (H); Erkki Heinonen	Finland	41	5	38	29	13	106; DNF	232	126
25	Silvio Santoni (H); Sergio Lambertenghi	Italy	21	53	15	11	27	106; BFD	233	127
26	Hubert Merkelbach (H); Gerrit Bartel	Germany	27	4	33	47	28	36	175	128
27	Giampiero Poggi (H); Giovanni Stilo	Italy	17	32	37	6	36	40	168	128
28	Flavio Marazzi (H); Kasper Harsberg	Switzerland	106; BFD	2	23	30	51	25	237	131
29	Vincent Hoesch (H); Florian Fendt	Germany	3	85	29	63	38	2	220	135
30	Luigi Ravioli (H); Andrea Guidi	Italy	35	8	47	9	43	106; DNF	248	142
31	Alexander Hagen (H); Carsten Witt	Germany	106; BFD	78	16	16	31	5	252	146
32	Maxwell Treacy (H); R. Anthony Shanks	Ireland	24	22	41	28	46	31	192	146
33	Michael Koch (H); Markus Koy	Germany	15	66	9	44	73	15	222	149
34	Andrew Hurst (H); Neil McGregor	Great Britain	46	29	44	34	20	23	196	150
35	Daniel Stegmeier (H); Beat Stegmeier	Switzerland	19	58	35	70	39	7	228	158
36	Andrea Racchelli (H); M. Ferrari	Italy	55	1	64	17	54	33	224	160
37	Paul Sustronk (H); Dag Nyhof	Canada	106; DNF	67	13	58	19	8	271	165
38	Gerhard Postma (H); Joost Houweling	Netherlands	106; BFD	43	26	32	23	45	275	169
39	Markus Reger (H); Markus Mehlen	Germany	38	45	28	23	55	37	226	171
40	Rob Douze (H); Vincent Geysen	Netherlands	106; DNC	62	34	26	35	17	280	174
41	Wilfrid Clerton (H); F. Bertrand-Nielsen	France	39	60	39	41	34	32	245	185
42	Jonas Wibom (H); F. Liljegren	Sweden	31	52	48	18	42	61	252	191
43	Bart Schipper (H); Boet Brinkgreve	Netherlands	60	10	82	10	90	30	282	192
44	Marin Lovrovic Jr. (H); Marko Glazar	Croatia	29	47	32	91	33	55	287	196
45	Paul-Ambroise Sevestre (H); Vincent Berenguier	France	106; BFD	49	106; DNF	14	25	16	316	210
46	Phil Rotermund (H); Tim Kraemer	Germany	82	79	46	22	22	54	305	223
47	Ingvar Krook (H); Daniel Kurbiel	Sweden	106; BFD	36	66	20	52	51	331	225
48	Klaus Kappes (H); Michael Häßler	Germany	30	28	74	27	70	72	301	227
49	Christoph Gautschi (H); Kurt Freuis	Switzerland	47	21	42	84	91	38	323	232
50	Bill Allen (H); Richard Burgess	United States	106; BFD	50	49	50	49	39	343	237
51	Vasyl Gureyev (H); Volodymyr Korotkov	Ukraine	37	26	55	60	66	67	311	244
52	Marco Minghetti (H); Paolo Fulvio	Italy	106; BFD	94	36	38	32	46	352	246
53	Peter van Veen (H); Paul Goelst	Netherlands	36	55	61	48	60	48	308	247
54	Han Bergsma (H); Rob Edens	Netherlands	44	18	56	95	40	106; DNF	359	253
55	Juha Oponen (H); Andres Hedman	Finland	106; DNC	59	50	65	41	41	362	256
56	Marc Blees (H); Bastiaan Kort	Netherlands	42	106; BFD	53	61	56	47	365	259
57	John Foster Sr. (H); John Foster Jr.	U.S. Virgin Islands	49	16	60	101	81	56	363	262
58	Antonio Tamburini (H); Renzo Ricci	Italy	106; BFD	25	52	66	84	35	368	262
59	Brad Anderson (H); Ryan Smith	Canada	45	73	58	52	45	65	338	265
60	Pedro Ambrosio (H); Joaquim Mendes	Portugal	63	39	62	49	62	59	334	271
61	Albert Ekels (H); Siebe Ekels	Netherlands	33	106; DSQ	70	56	57	57	379	273
62	Douglas Smith (H); Mike Moore	United States	106; BFD	70	43	81	37	42	379	273
63	Peter Erzberger (H); Hans-Jürg Saner	Switzerland	106; BFD	23	73	73	47	60	382	276
64	Hans Fogh (H); Kai Bjorn	Canada	34	106; BFD	27	4	106; DNF	106; DNC	383	277
65	Viktor Soloviev (H); Anatoly Mikhailin	Russia	32	90	106; OCS	74	15	66	383	277
66	Sven Winkelmann (H); Sören Dretzko	Germany	106; DSQ	46	45	96	76	53	316	279
67	Mikhail Skachkov (H); Igor Konstantinov	Russia	59	19	83	83	50	69	363	280
68	Uwe Fernholz (H); Stefan Diestelmann	Germany	56	6	68	53	106; DNF	106; DNC	395	289
69	Peer Wilhelm (H); Jon Gerber	Germany	52	68	65	90	48	62	385	295
70	Sergej Kramskoj (H); Wadim Akimenko	Russia	51	76	71	103	74	34	409	306
71	Dierk Thomsen (H); Jakob Just	Germany	73	11	84	72	71	106; DNF	417	311
72	Claude Bonanni (H); Arthur Anosov	United States	67	84	85	57	59	44	396	311
73	Fredrik Ljungkvist (H); Daniel Alm	Sweden	106; BFD	48	67	68	64	68	421	315
74	M. Hollerweger (H); Bernard Rottner	Austria	54	61	59	79	63	106; DNC	422	316
75	Theodor Prey (H); Matthias Poell	Austria	80	7	93	69	92	75	416	323
76	Uwe Hannemann (H); Jochen Borbet	Germany	66	40	106; OCS	80	88	49	429	323
77	Mario Salani (H); Luca Devotti	Italy	50	89	30	51	106; DNC	106; DNC	432	326
78	Eizens Cepurnieks (H); Eizens Kanskis	Latvia	69	65	79	100	65	50	428	328
79	Regi Schlubach (H); John Schlubach	Germany	58	51	86	71	78	71	415	329
80	Josef Urban (H); Martin Mayr	Austria	64	54	106; OCS	54	83	77	438	332
81	Harald Wirth (H); Thomas Müller	Austria	77	34	92	102	58	73	436	334
82	Jeannot Walder (H); Hans Korevaar	Switzerland	61	42	80	77	75	106; DNC	441	335
83	Marko Marinovic (H); Nikola Akrap	Croatia	57	63	76	86	61	79	422	336
84	Hermann Weiler (H); Josef Matrai	Germany	79	87	89	21	87	63	426	337
85	Hervé Salomon (H); Gordon Davies	France	74	13	97	92	82	78	436	339
86	Nicolas Loday (H); Alain Nicolas	France	106; DNF	106; BFD	63	76	53	52	456	350
87	Josef Pieper (H); Dirk Meissner	Germany	106; BFD	74	57	75	86	58	456	350
88	Luca Simeone (H); Leone Rocca	Italy	48	93	106; DNF	62	106; DSQ	43	458	352
89	Werner Biebl (H); Sergei Horetski	Germany	65	81	106; DNF	40	69	106; DNF	467	361
90	Benny Nilsson (H); Stefan Nilsson	Sweden	62	95	75	89	79	64	464	369
91	Andreas Dellwig (H); Hans-Martin Botz	Germany	53	86	54	78	106; DNF	106; DNC	483	377
92	Alfred Horstmann (H); Gutknecht	Germany	81	41	94	106; DNF	85	80	487	381
93	Henrik Dannesboe (H); Jesper D. Rasmussen	Switzerland	40	106; BFD	78	55	106; DNC	106; DNC	491	385
94	Detlef Kuke (H); Jens Pape	Germany	75	106; BFD	88	45	72	106; DNC	492	386
95	Will Beuel (H); Stefano Lillia	Luxembourg	71	97	72	67	80	106; DNC	493	387
96	Klaus Meyer (H); Andreas Loesche	Germany	106; BFD	92	69	33	89	106; BFD	495	389
97	Alessandro Castelli (H); Luca Fabi	Italy	43	71	106; DNF	64	106; DSQ	106; DNC	496	390
98	Per Ekborg (H); Leif Caspersson	Sweden	70	83	77	97	93	74	494	397
99	Manfred Belgardt (H); Kai Karlsberg	Germany	72	98	91	85	77	76	499	401
100	Sergey Lapkin (H); Vladimir Ikonicov	Russia	106; BFD	77	90	99	67	70	509	403
101	Ben Staartjes (H); Ko van den Berg	Netherlands	68	33	106; OCS	94	106; DNS	106; DNC	513	407
102	Gert Sefzik (H); Lutz Kramer	Germany	76	75	87	88	106; DNS	106; DNC	538	432
103	Guus Bierman (H); Robert Jan Staartjes	Netherlands	106; BFD	96	81	87	68	106; DNC	544	438
104	Harry W. Walker (H); J.P. Meijboom	United States	78	72	95	98	106; DNS	106; DNC	555	449
105	Willem Vlaksveld (H); Frank Willem	Netherlands	106; BFD	88	96	93	106; DNF	106; DNC	595	489

Legend: BFD – Black flag disqualification; DNC – Did not come to the starting area; DNF – Did not finish; DNS – Did not start; DSQ – Disqualified; OCS – On the course side of the starting line; RAF – Retired after finishing;
