= Sailing at the 2000 Summer Olympics – Soling =

Sailing at the Olympics

Fleet/Match at the Games of the XXVII Olympiad
- Soling
- Venue: Sydney
- Dates: First race: 17 September 2000; Last race: 30 September 2000
- Competitors: 48 from 16 nations
- Teams: 16

Medalists
1st place, gold medalist(s)		Jesper Bank; Henrik Blakskjær; Thomas Jacobsen	Denmark
2nd place, silver medalist(s)		Jochen Schümann; Gunnar Bahr; Ingo Borkowski	Germany
3rd place, bronze medalist(s)		Herman Horn Johannessen; Paul Davis; Espen Stokkeland	Norway

The Soling Three Person Keelboat was sailed at the 2000 Summer Olympics held from 17 to 30 September 2000 in Sydney, Australia. The series started as a fleet race and then switched to match racing for the twelve best crew. 16 crews from 16 countries competed on 16 boats with a total of 48 sailors.

The Norwegian crew of Herman Horn Johannessen, Paul Davis and Espen Stokkeland finished first in the fleet racing stage, while Danish crew of Jesper Bank, Henrik Blakskjær and Thomas Jacobsen won the Olympic gold medal by beating the German crew of 1996 champion helmsman Jochen Schümann, Gunnar Bahr and Ingo Borkowski with 4–3 in the final series. Norway won the bronze medal through beating the Netherlands with 3–1 in matches.

== Results ==
=== Fleet race ===
Points are assigned based on the finishing position in each race (1 for first, 2 for second, etc.). The points are totalled from the top 10 results of the 11 races, with lower totals being better. If a sailor was disqualified or did not complete the race, 26 points are assigned for that race (as there were 25 sailors in this competition).

Results of individual races
Pos	Crew	Country	I	II	III	IV	V	VI	Tot	Pts
1	Herman Horn Johannessen; Paul Davis; Espen Stokkeland	Norway	5	2	1	3	5	DNS 17^{†}	33	16
2	Rod Davis; Don Cowie; Alan Smith	New Zealand	3	3	10^{†}	2	7	3	28	18
3	Roy Heiner; Peter van Niekerk; Dirk de Ridder	Netherlands	1	5	13^{†}	11	1	1	32	19
4	Jeff Madrigali; Craig Healy; Hartwell Jordan	United States	4	14	2	16^{†}	2	2	40	24
5	Georgy Shayduko; Oleg Khopyorsky; Andrey Kirilyuk	Russia	2	8	4	8	6	9^{†}	37	28
6	Neville Wittey; Josh Grace; David Edwards	Australia	8	11	6	1	9	14^{†}	49	35
7	Andy Beadsworth; Richard Sydenham; Barry Parkin	Great Britain	13^{†}	7	8	4	4	13	49	36
8	Sergiy Pichugin; Volodymyr Korotkov; Sergiy Timokhov	Ukraine	12	1	7	6	OCS 17^{†}	12	55	38
9	Philippe Presti; Pascal Rambeau; Jean-Marie Dauris	France	9	13^{†}	11	9	3	7	52	39
10	Jochen Schümann; Gunnar Bahr; Ingo Borkowski	Germany	14^{†}	10	3	7	10	11	55	41
11	Hans Wallen; Johan Barne; Magnus Augustson	Sweden	7	15	5	10	OCS 17^{†}	5	59	42
12	Jesper Bank; Henrik Blakskjær; Thomas Jacobsen	Denmark	6	16^{†}	12	12	11	4	61	45
13	Bill Abbott; Matt Abbott; Brad Boston	Canada	10	9	9	13^{†}	12	8	61	48
14	Nicola Celon; Daniele De Luca; Michele Paoletti	Italy	16^{†}	6	14	5	14	10	65	49
15	Jali Mäkilä; Eki Heinonen; Sami Tamminen	Finland	11	4	15^{†}	14	13	15	72	57
16	Manuel Doreste; Domingo Manrique; Juan Luis Wood	Spain	15	12	16^{†}	15	8	6	74	58

Legend: – Advance to Quarter-finals; – Advance to Round robin 2; – Advance to Round robin 1; DNS – Did not start; OCS – On the course side of the starting line; † – Discarded race not counted in the overall result;

=== Match race ===
==== Round robin 1 ====
Pos	Team	Pld	W	L		GER	SWE	DEN	FRA	UKR	GBR
1	Germany	5	4 (Note: Germany won against Sweden.)	1	Advance to Round robin 2	—	W	L	W	W	W
2	Sweden	5	4	1	Advance to Round robin 2	L	—	W	W	W	W
3	Denmark	5	3	2	Advance to Round robin 2	W	L	—	W	W	L
4	France	5	2	3		L	L	L	—	W	W
5	Ukraine	5	1 (Note: Ukraine won against Great Britain.)	4		L	L	L	L	—	W
6	Great Britain	5	1	4		L	L	W	L	L	—

Updated to match(es) played on unknown. Source:

==== Round robin 2 ====
Pos	Team	Pld	W	L		DEN	GER	RUS	SWE	AUS	USA
1	Denmark	5	4	1	Advance to Quarter-finals	—	W	W	L	W	W
2	Germany	5	3 (Note: Germany won against Russia and Sweden, Russia won against Sweden.)	2	Advance to Quarter-finals	L	—	W	W	W	L
3	Russia	5	3	2	Advance to Quarter-finals	L	L	—	W	W	W
4	Sweden	5	3	2		W	L	L	—	W	W
5	Australia	5	1 (Note: Australia won against USA.)	4		L	L	L	L	—	W
6	United States	5	1	4		L	W	L	L	L	—

Updated to match(es) played on unknown. Source:

==== Quarter-finals ====
Pos	Team	Pld	W	L		DEN	GER	NED	NOR	NZL	RUS
1	Denmark	5	4 (Note: Denmark won against Germany.)	1	Advance to Semi-finals	—	L	W	W	W	W
2	Germany	5	4	1	Advance to Semi-finals	W	—	W	W	W	L
3	Netherlands	5	2 (Note: Netherlands won against New Zealand and Norway, Norway won against New Zealand.)	3	Advance to Semi-finals	L	L	—	L	W	W
4	Norway	5	2	3	Advance to Semi-finals	L	L	W	—	L	W
5	New Zealand	5	2	3		L	L	L	W	—	W
6	Russia	5	1	4		L	W	L	L	L	—

Updated to match(es) played on unknown. Source:

==== Semi-finals ====
Team	I	II	III	IV	Pts
Germany	L	W	W	W	3
Netherlands	W	L	L	L	1

Team	I	II	III	IV	Pts
Denmark	W	L	W	W	3
Norway	L	W	L	L	1

==== Match for third place ====
Team	I	II	III	IV	Pts
Norway	W	L	W	W	3
Netherlands	L	W	L	L	1

==== Final ====
Team	I	II	III	IV	V	VI	VII	Pts
Denmark	W	L	L	W	L	W	W	4
Germany	L	W	W	L	W	L	L	3

== Sources ==
- Results and weather take from https://web.archive.org/web/20050825083600/http://www.sailing.org/olympics2000/info2000/
- ; sports-reference
