= Juan Luis Wood =

Olympic sailor from Spain

Personal information
- Full name: Juan Luis Wood Valdivielso
- Nationality: Spain
- Born: 29 March 1974 (age 52) Las Palmas de Gran Canaria
- Height: 1.75 m (5.7 ft)

Sport

Sailing career
- Class: Soling
- Club: RCNGC, Las Palmas de Gran Canaria
- Updated on 1 March 2020

Juan Luis Wood (born 29 March 1974) is a sailor from Las Palmas de Gran Canaria, Spain. World champion junior 1991 and 1992 in 470 class with Luis Martínez Doreste, and represented his country at the 2000 Summer Olympics in Sydney, Australia as crew member in the Soling. With helmsman Manuel Doreste and fellow crew member Domingo Manrique they took the 16th place.
