= Jean-Marie Dauris =

Olympic sailor from France

Personal information
- Nationality: France
- Born: 16 October 1972 (age 53) Arcachon
- Height: 1.76 m (5.8 ft)

Sport

Sailing career
- Class: Soling
- Club: CV Arcachon
- Updated on 1 March 2020

Jean-Marie Dauris (born 16 October 1972) is a sailor from Arcachon, France, who represented his country at the 2000 Summer Olympics in Sydney, Australia as crew member in the Soling. With helmsman Philippe Presti and crewmate Pascal Rambeau they took tenth place.
