= Sailing at the 1992 Summer Olympics – Flying Dutchman =

Sailing at the Olympics

Flying Dutchman at the Games of the XXV Olympiad
- Flying Dutchman
- Venue: Barcelona
- Dates: 27 July to 2 August
- Competitors: 46 from 23 nations
- Teams: 23

Medalists
1st place, gold medalist(s)		Luis Doreste; Domingo Manrique	Spain
2nd place, silver medalist(s)		Paul Foerster; Stephen Bourdow	United States
3rd place, bronze medalist(s)		Jørgen Bojsen-Møller; Jens Bojsen-Møller	Denmark

The Flying Dutchman competition at the 1992 Summer Olympics was held from 27 July to 4 August 1992, in Barcelona, Spain. Points were awarded for placement in each race. The best six out of seven race scores did count for the final placement.

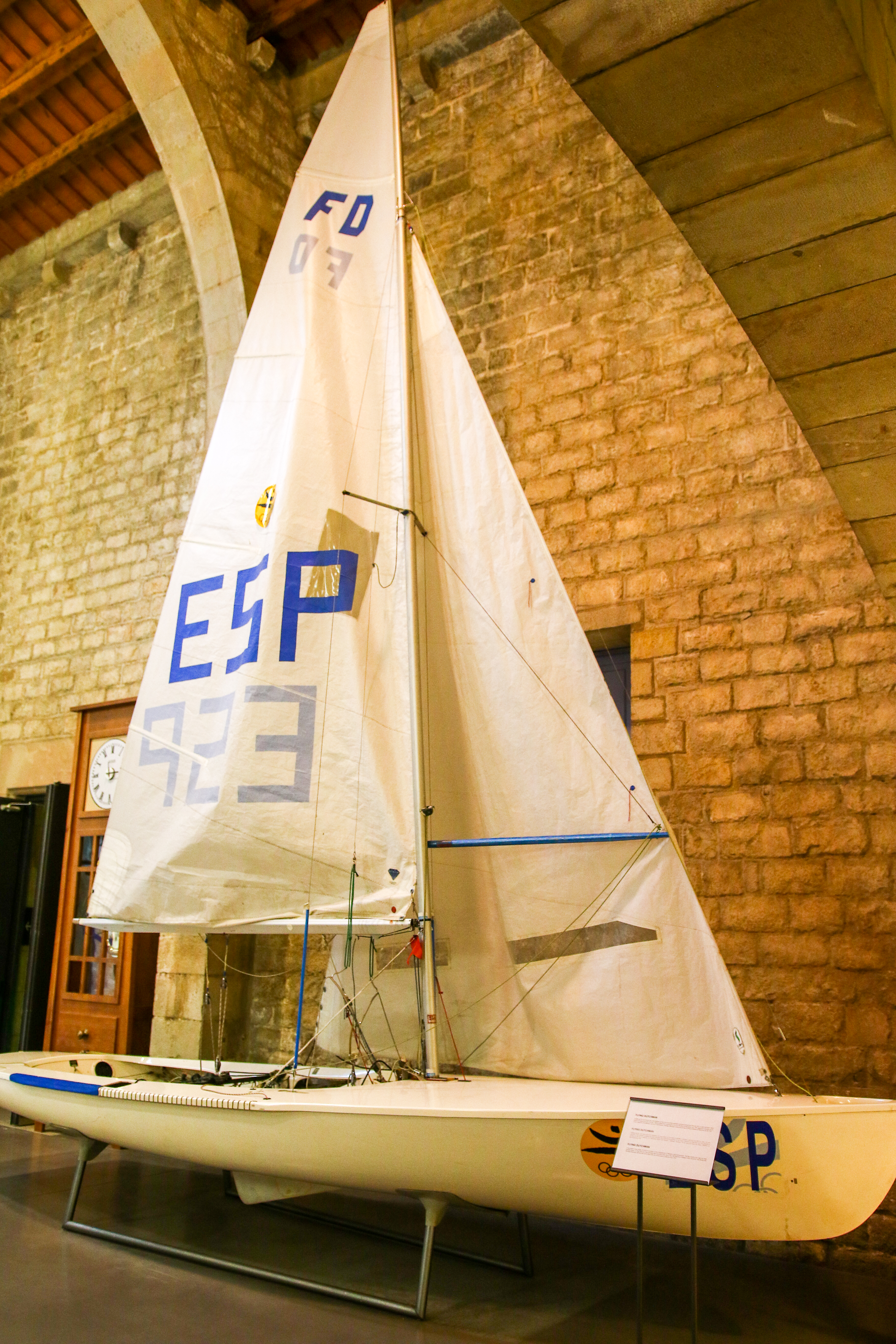
The Flying Dutchman – the boat with which Luis Doreste and Domingo Manrique (Esp) won the Olympic title of the Olympic Games in Barcelona in 1992, Maritime Museum of Barcelona

== Results ==
Rank	Helmsman (Country)	Crew	Race I		Race II		Race III		Race IV		Race V		Race VI		Race VII		Total Points	Total -1
Rank	Helmsman (Country)	Crew	Rank	Points	Rank	Points	Rank	Points	Rank	Points	Rank	Points	Rank	Points	Rank	Points	Total Points	Total -1
1	Luis Doreste (ESP)	Domingo Manrique	1	0.0	2	3.0	9	15.0	2	3.0	2	3.0	3	5.7	~~13~~	~~19.0~~	48.7	29.7
2	Paul Foerster (USA)	Stephen Bourdow	6	11.7	1	0.0	1	0.0	1	0.0	~~17~~	~~23.0~~	4	8.0	7	13.0	55.7	32.7
3	Jørgen Bojsen-Møller (DEN)	Jens Bojsen-Møller	~~11~~	~~17.0~~	3	5.7	10	16.0	5	10.0	1	0.0	2	3.0	2	3.0	54.7	37.7
4	Murray Jones (NZL)	Greg Knowles	~~19~~	~~25.0~~	12	18.0	2	3.0	12	18.0	7	13.0	1	0.0	10	16.0	102.0	77.0
5	Albert Batzill (GER)	Peter Lang	3	5.7	5	10.0	8	14.0	7	13.0	10	16.0	6	11.7	~~19~~	~~25.0~~	95.4	70.4
6	Mats Nyberg (SWE)	Johan Lindell	8	14.0	7	13.0	3	5.7	~~16~~	~~22.0~~	6	11.7	14	20.0	8	14.0	100.4	78.4
7	Ole Petter Pollen (NOR)	Knut Frostad	10	16.0	~~14~~	~~20.0~~	6	11.7	4	8.0	9	15.0	7	13.0	11	17.0	100.7	80.7
8	Jan Eckert (SUI)	Piet Eckert	~~15~~	~~21.0~~	8	14.0	17	23.0	6	11.7	11	17.0	5	10.0	4	8.0	104.7	81.7
9	Frank McLaughlin (CAN)	John Millen	~~12~~	~~18.0~~	13	19.0	7	13.0	13	19.0	4	8.0	15	21.0	3	5.7	103.7	82.7
10	Thierry Berger (FRA)	Vincent Berger	4	8.0	9	15.0	15	21.0	~~DNF~~	~~30.0~~	19	25.0	12	18.0	5	10.0	127.0	97.0
11	Georgy Shayduko (EUN)	Viktor Budantsev	21	27.0	4	8.0	4	8.0	~~DSQ~~	~~30.0~~	22	28.0	9	15.0	6	11.7	127.7	97.7
12	Mitja Kosmina (SLO)	Goran Šošić	14	20.0	~~20~~	~~26.0~~	21	27.0	17	23.0	3	5.7	20	26.0	1	0.0	127.7	100.7
13	Alan Adler (BRA)	Marcus Temke	20	26.0	6	11.7	5	10.0	8	14.0	~~23~~	~~29.0~~	17	23.0	12	18.0	131.7	102.7
14	David Wilkins (IRL)	Peter Terence Kennedy	18	24.0	17	23.0	11	17.0	3	5.7	15	21.0	10	16.0	~~20~~	~~26.0~~	132.7	106.7
15	Adrian Stead (GBR)	Peter Allam	2	3.0	~~18~~	~~24.0~~	16	22.0	9	15.0	20	26.0	16	22.0	15	21.0	133.0	107.0
16	Stephan Schurich (AUT)	Markus Schneeberger	7	13.0	~~19~~	~~25.0~~	18	24.0	11	17.0	8	14.0	8	14.0	21	27.0	134.0	107.0
17	Simon Ellis (HKG)	Sven Merkel	9	15.0	15	21.0	13	19.0	15	21.0	12	18.0	~~18~~	~~24.0~~	9	15.0	133.0	109.0
18	Willem Potma (NED)	Gerhard Potma	~~23~~	~~29.0~~	10	16.0	12	18.0	10	16.0	14	20.0	13	19.0	18	24.0	142.0	113.0
19	Dave Hudson (RSA)	David Kitchen	5	10.0	16	22.0	~~22~~	~~28.0~~	20	26.0	16	22.0	22	28.0	14	20.0	156.0	128.0
20	Yoel Sela (ISR)	Eldad Amir	16	22.0	~~23~~	~~29.0~~	20	26.0	18	24.0	13	19.0	11	17.0	16	22.0	159.0	130.0
21	Luca Santella (ITA)	Flavio Grassi	17	23.0	11	17.0	23	29.0	14	20.0	18	24.0	19	25.0	~~PMS~~	~~30.0~~	168.0	138.0
22	Bojan Grego (CRO)	Sebastijan Miknić	~~22~~	~~28.0~~	22	28.0	14	20.0	21	27.0	5	10.0	DND	30.0	DND	30.0	173.0	145.0
23	Tamás Pomucz (HUN)	Tamás Somogyi	13	19.0	~~21~~	~~27.0~~	19	25.0	19	25.0	21	27.0	21	27.0	17	23.0	173.0	146.0

=== Daily standings ===
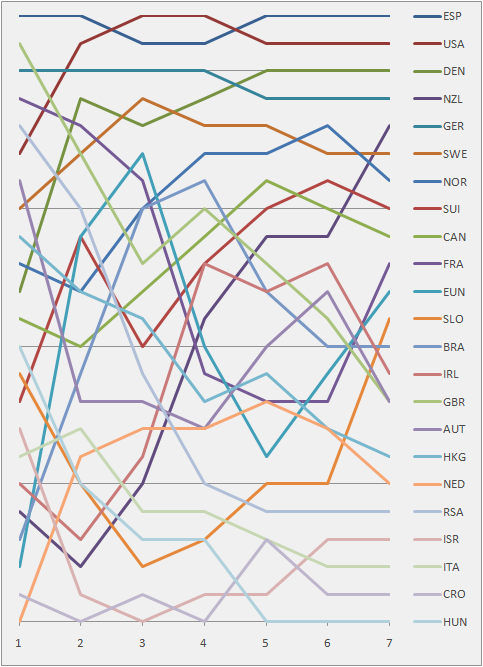
Graph showing the daily standings in the FD during the 1992 Summer Olympics
