= Tamás Pomucz =

Hungarian sailor (1957–2020)

Personal information
- Nationality: Hungarian
- Born: 12 June 1957; Siófok, Hungary
- Died: 31 July 2020 (aged 63)

Sport
- Sport: Sailing

Tamás Pomucz (12 June 1957 – 31 July 2020) was a Hungarian sailor. In 1989, together with Béla Argay he won the gold medal at the European Championships in Balatonfüred in the Flying Dutchman event. He competed in the Flying Dutchman event at the 1992 Summer Olympics. He later became a coach and federal captain.
