= Bojan Grego =

Croatian sailor

Personal information
- Nationality: Croatian
- Born: 9 July 1970 (age 55) Rijeka, Yugoslavia

Sport
- Sport: Sailing

Bojan Grego (born 9 July 1970) is a Croatian sailor. He competed in the Flying Dutchman event at the 1992 Summer Olympics.

He was European champion in the 420 in 1989, and national champion in the Snipe in 2014, 2016, 2017 and 2021.
