= David Kitchen =

South African sailor

Personal information
- Nationality: South African
- Born: 15 September 1953 (age 71)

Sport
- Sport: Sailing

David Kitchen (born 15 September 1953) is a South African sailor. He competed in the Flying Dutchman event at the 1992 Summer Olympics.
