= Simon Ellis (sailor) =

Hong Kong sailor

Personal information
- Nationality: Hong Konger
- Born: 21 August 1963 (age 62)

Sport
- Sport: Sailing

Simon Patrick Ellis (born 21 August 1963) is a Hong Kong sailor. He competed in the Flying Dutchman event at the 1992 Summer Olympics. (Note: "Simon Ellis". Olympedia. Archived from the original on 2022-06-08.)
