= Johan Lindell =

Swedish sailor

Personal information
- Nationality: Swedish
- Born: 20 August 1964 (age 61) Eslöv, Sweden

Sport
- Sport: Sailing

Johan Lindell (born 20 August 1964) is a Swedish sailor. He competed in the Flying Dutchman event at the 1992 Summer Olympics.
