= Sven Merkel =

Hong Kong sailor

Personal information
- Nationality: Hong Konger
- Born: 27 March 1965 (age 59)

Sport
- Sport: Sailing

Sven Merkel (born 27 March 1965) is a Hong Kong sailor. He competed in the Flying Dutchman event at the 1992 Summer Olympics.
