= Goran Šošić =

Slovenian sailor

Personal information
- Nationality: Slovenian
- Born: 9 December 1962 (age 62); Koper, Yugoslavia

Sport
- Sport: Sailing

Goran Šošić (born 9 December 1962) is a Slovenian sailor. He competed in the Flying Dutchman event at the 1992 Summer Olympics.
