= Tamás Somogyi =

Hungarian sailor

Personal information
- Nationality: Hungarian
- Born: 15 August 1958 (age 66); Székesfehérvár, Hungary

Sport
- Sport: Sailing

Tamás Somogyi (born 15 August 1958) is a Hungarian sailor. He competed in the Flying Dutchman event at the 1992 Summer Olympics.
