= Sebastijan Miknić =

Croatian sailor (born 1970)

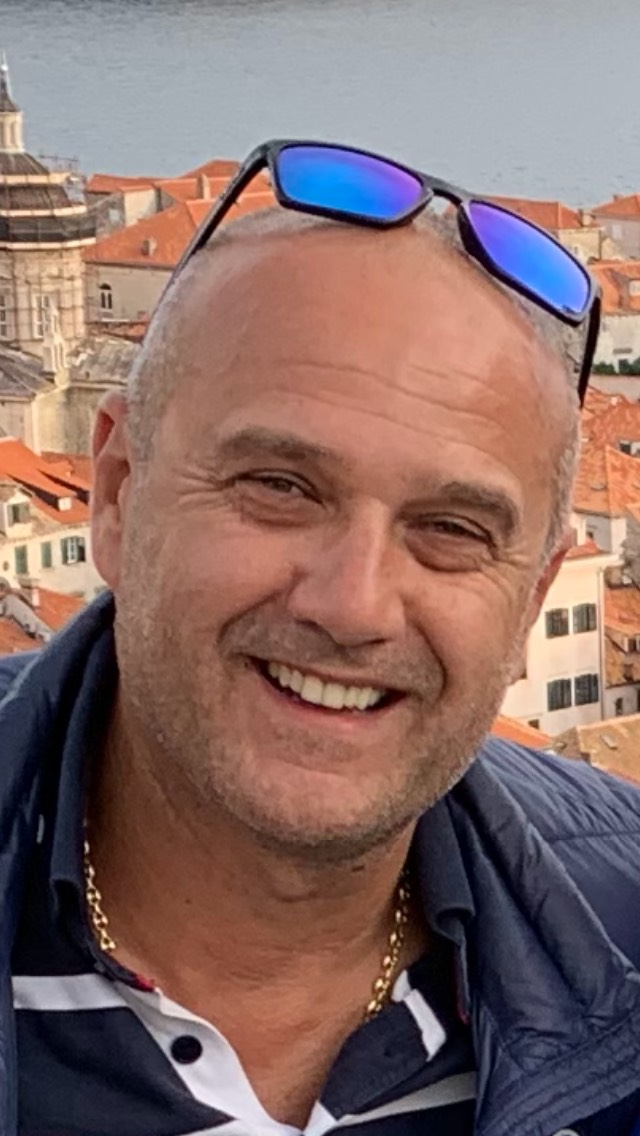

Personal information
- Nationality: Croatian
- Born: 27 May 1970 (age 55) Rijeka, Yugoslavia

Sport
- Sport: Sailing

Sebastijan Miknić (born 27 May 1970) is a Croatian sailor. He competed in the Flying Dutchman event at the 1992 Summer Olympics.

== Personal life ==
Sebastijan is a father of two sons, Maro and Niko who are swimmers in the PK Nevera team from Rijeka.
