= Mitja Kosmina =

Slovenian sailor

Personal information
- Nationality: Slovenian
- Born: 4 November 1966 (age 58); Koper, Yugoslavia

Sport
- Sport: Sailing

Mitja Kosmina (born 4 November 1966) is a Slovenian sailor. He competed in the Flying Dutchman event at the 1992 Summer Olympics.
