= Christian Binder =

Austrian sailor (born 1962)

Personal information
- Nationality: Austrian
- Born: 13 November 1962 (age 62) Vienna, Austria

Sport
- Sport: Sailing

Christian Binder (born 13 November 1962) is an Austrian sailor. He competed at the 1988 Summer Olympics and the 1992 Summer Olympics.
