= Daniel Alm =

Swedish Pentecostal pastor

Daniel Karl-Olov Alm (born 15 December 1971 in Björköby, Sweden) is a Swedish former pastor and leader within the Swedish Pentecostal movement. He was the lead pastor of the Pentecostal church in Västerås between 2006 and 2024, and the General Superintendent of the Pentecostal Alliance of Independent churches from 2016 to 2023, when he resigned with immediate effect following accusations. His position as pastor in Västerås was terminated by the church on 8 April 2024, following the denomination's review of the accusations which was published on 14 February 2024.

Alm has written several books about Christian faith, and been a contributor to papers and magazines including Dagen, Världen idag, and Vestmanlands Läns Tidning. He was the head pastor of the Pentecostal churches in Oskarström (1994–1999 and 2000–2006). He has also been pastor in Tranås.

In the summer of 2024, Alm made a legal claim for wrong dismissal from his post as pastor at Västerås Pentecostal Church, requesting compensation. The case was heard in March 2025 at Västerås District Court. In the negotiations, Alm admitted consensual sexual relations with two co-workers. On 7 April 2025, the court judged that the church had acted in accordance with employment law in the case of Alm's dismissal. He was ordered to pay the legal fees of the church. Alm has appealed the verdict in its entirety to the Swedish Labour Court. But on 15 May 2025, his appeal was rejected and the original decision, that the church had acted lawfully, was upheld. Alm has no further rights to appeal the decision.

== Bibliography ==
=== Books ===
- Privat kyrka - orka bry sig om gemenskap, 2010. ISBN 978-91-8585-3878.
- Praktisk kristendom - visdom från Jakobs brev i Nya Testamentet, 2012. ISBN 978-91-8693-5320.
- Andens frukter och gåvor, 2013. ISBN 978-91-7866-8878.
- Till uppbyggelse, 2016. ISBN 9789188247148.
- Kallad, bekräftad, överlåten, 2018. ISBN 9789173876650.
- Tungotal, tänkande, tjänande, 2019. ISBN 9789173878432.
