= Neville Wittey =

Olympic sailor from Australia

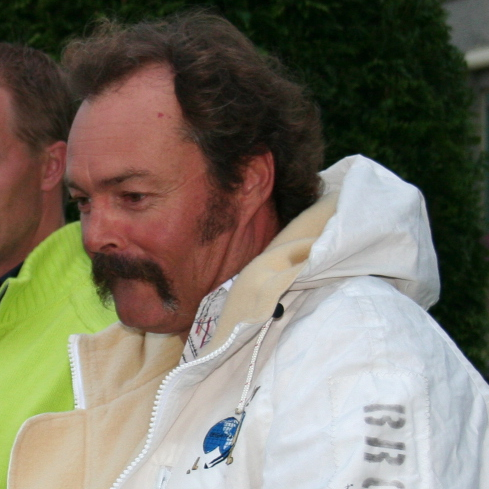
- Neville Wittey (2006) during matchrace with Micro Magic

Personal information
- Nationality: Australia
- Born: 4 September 1957 (age 68) Melbourne
- Height: 1.75 m (5.7 ft)

Sport

Sailing career
- Class: Soling
- Club: Royal Sydney Yacht Squadron
- Updated on 1 March 2020

Neville Wittey (born 4 September 1957 in Melbourne) is a sailor from Australia, who represented his country at the 2000 Summer Olympics in Sydney, Australia as helmsman in the Soling. With crew members Josh Grace and David Edwards they took 8th place.
