= Andy Beadsworth =

Olympic sailor from Great Britain

Personal information
- Full name: Andrew Beadsworth
- Nationality: United Kingdom
- Born: 29 April 1967 Nottingham
- Height: 1.85 m (6.1 ft)

Sailing career
- Sport: Sailing
- Class: Soling
- Updated on 29 February 2020

Andy Beadsworth (born 28 April 1967, in Nottingham) is a sailor from Great Britain, who represented his country at the 1996 Summer Olympics in Savannah, United States as helmsman in the Soling. With crew members Barry Parkin and Adrian Stead they took the 4th place. During the 2000 Summer Olympics in Sydney, Australia Andy took 12th place in the Soling with crew members Barry Parkin and Richard Sydenham.
