= Sami Tamminen (sailor) =

Olympic sailor from Finland

Personal information
- Full name: Sami Tuomas Tamminen
- Nationality: Finland
- Born: 17 February 1971 (age 55) Espoo, Uusimaa, Finland
- Height: 1.75 m (5.7 ft)

Sailing career
- Sport: Sailing
- Club: Helsingfors Segelsällskap
- Class: Soling
- Updated on 1 March 2020

Sami Tamminen (born 17 February 1971) is a sailor from Espoo, Finland. who represented his country at the 2000 Summer Olympics in Sydney, Australia as crew member in the Soling. With helmsman Jali Mäkilä and fellow crew member Eki Heinonen they took the 15th place.
