= Josh Grace =

Olympic sailor from Australia

Joshua Grace
Personal information
- Full name: Joshua Grace
- Nationality: Australia
- Born: 22 November 1972 (age 53) Sydney
- Height: 1.72 m (5.6 ft)

Sport

Sailing career
- Class: Soling
- Club: Royal Sydney Yacht Squadron
- Updated on 1 March 2020

Joshua (Josh) Grace (born 22 November 1972) is a sailor from Sydney, Australia. who represented his country at the 2000 Summer Olympics in Sydney, Australia as crew member in the Soling. With helmsman Neville Wittey and fellow crew member David Edwards they took the 8th place.
