= Yannick Adde =

French sailor

Personal information
- Nationality: French
- Born: 8 September 1969 (age 56) Langon, France
- Height: 1.95 m (6 ft 5 in)
- Weight: 115 kg (254 lb)

Sport
- Sport: Sailing

Yannick Adde (born 8 September 1969) is a French sailor. He competed in the 1992 Summer Olympics.

== Biography ==
He competed in the Star class event at the 1992 Summer Olympics alongside Patrick Haegeli; the French team finished in eighteenth place.

He won a bronze medal in the Star class at the 2002 World Championships with Xavier Rohart. He retired from competition in June 2003 due to health problems.
