= Barry Parkin =

Olympic sailor from Great Britain

Personal information
- Nationality: United Kingdom
- Born: 1 April 1964 (age 61) Leeds
- Height: 1.88 m (6.2 ft)

Sport

Sailing career
- Class: Soling
- Updated on 29 February 2020

Barry Parkin (born 1 April 1964) is a sailor from Leeds, Great Britain. who represented his country at the 1996 Summer Olympics in Savannah, United States as crew member in the Soling. With helmsman Andy Beadsworth and fellow crew member Adrian Stead they took the 4th place. During the 2000 Summer Olympics in Sydney, Australia Barry took 12th place in the Soling with helmsman Andy Beadsworth and fellow crewmember Richard Sydenham.
