= David Edwards (sailor) =

Olympic sailor from Australia

Personal information
- Nationality: Australia
- Born: 11 November 1973 (age 52) Sydney
- Height: 1.78 m (5.8 ft)

Sport

Sailing career
- Class: Soling
- Club: Royal Sydney Yacht Squadron
- Updated on 1 March 2020

David Edwards (born 11 November 1973) is a sailor from Sydney, Australia. who represented his country at the 2000 Summer Olympics in Sydney, Australia as crew member in the Soling. With helmsman Neville Wittey and fellow crew member Josh Grace they took the 8th place.
