= Sami Tamminen =

Finnish ice hockey player

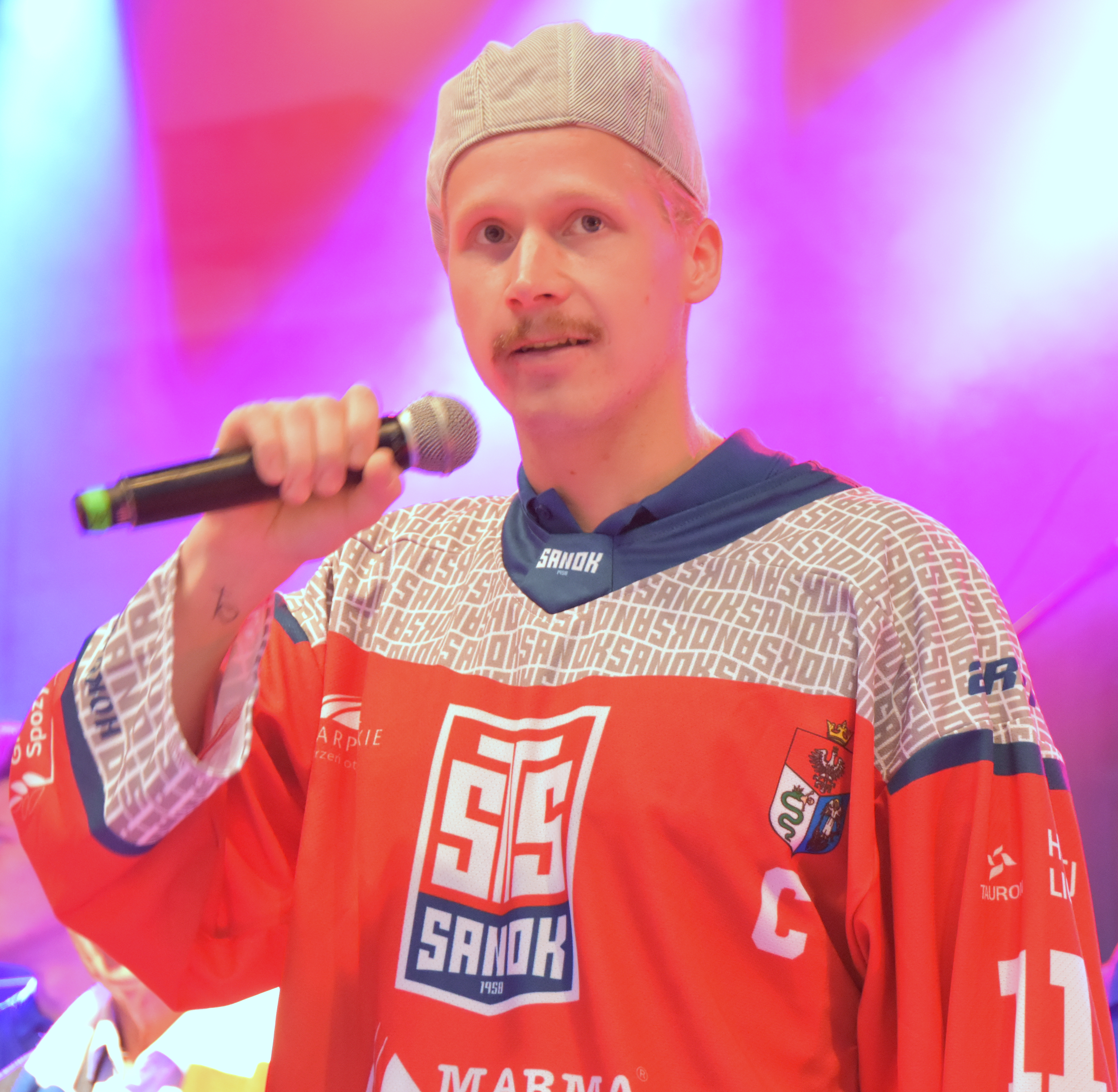
- 225px
- Born: July 19, 1997 (age 29) Valkeala, Finland
- Height: 6 ft 1 in (185 cm)
- Weight: 187 lb (85 kg; 13 st 5 lb)
- Position: Forward
- Shoots: Left
- Hockeyettan team Former teams: Visby/Roma HK; KooKoo
- Playing career: 2016–present

Sami Tamminen (born July 19, 1997) is a Finnish professional ice hockey forward playing for Visby/Roma HK of Hockeyettan.

== Career ==
Tamminen made his Liiga debut for KooKoo during the 2016–17 Liiga season, playing 29 games and scored one goal and three assists. He also had a loan spell with KeuPa HT of Mestis that season where he played five games.

The following season, Tamminen played 34 games for KooKoo and registered four goals and three assists. After scoring no points in 18 games during the 2018–19 Liiga season, Tamminen was loaned to KOOVEE of Mestis for the remainder of the season.

After failing to make the KooKoo lineup for the 2019–20 Liiga season, Tamminen was once again sent out on loan to Mestis, this time to Hokki for an indefinite period. He would play the entire season with Hokki, scoring seven goals and nine assists in 23 games as the team finished bottom of the Mestis standings. On August 6, 2020, Tamminen moved to Sweden and signed for Visby/Roma HK of Hockeyettan.

== Career statistics ==
			Regular season					Playoffs
Season	Team	League	GP	G	A	Pts	PIM	GP	G	A	Pts	PIM
2014–15	KooKoo	Mestis	20	0	1	1	0	-	-	-	-	-
2015–16	KooKoo	Jr. A	43	12	15	27	4	-	-	-	-	-
2016–17	KooKoo	Jr. A	24	5	14	19	2	-	-	-	-	-
2016–17	KooKoo	Liiga	29	1	3	4	6	-	-	-	-	-
2016–17	KeuPa HT	Mestis	5	1	1	2	0	-	-	-	-	-
2017–18	KooKoo	Jr. A	31	8	13	21	30	3	0	1	1	2
2017–18	KooKoo	Liiga	34	4	3	7	2	-	-	-	-	-
2018–19	KooKoo	Jr. A	6	1	3	4	2	-	-	-	-	-	-
2018–19	KooKoo	Liiga	18	0	0	0	0	-	-	-	-	-
2018–19	KOOVEE	Mestis	25	5	17	22	12	-	-	-	-	-
2019–20	Hokki	Mestis	23	7	9	16	16	-	-	-	-	-
Liiga totals			81	5	6	11	8	-	-	-	-	-
