= Mario Celon =

Olympic sailor from Italy

Personal information
- Nationality: Italy
- Born: 29 August 1959 Verona
- Height: 1.72 m (5.6 ft)

Sport

Sailing career
- Class: Soling
- Club: Fraglia Vela Riva
- Updated on 29 February 2020

Mario Celon (born: 29 August 1959 Verona) is a sailor from Italy, who represented his country at the 1996 Summer Olympics in Savannah, United States as helmsman in the Soling. With crew members Gianni Torboli and Claudio Celon they took the 10th place.
