= Serhiy Khaindrava =

Olympic sailor from Soviet Union

Björn Alm
Personal information
- Native name: Сергій Хайндрава
- Nationality: Unified Team, Ukraine
- Born: 10 October 1961 (age 64) Soviet Union

Sport

Sailing career
- Class: Soling
- Updated on 28 February 2020

Serhiy Khaindrava (born 23 December 1961, Born in the USSR) is a sailor. who represented the Unified Team at the 1992 Summer Olympics in Barcelona, Spain as crew member in the Soling. With helmsman Serhiy Pichuhin, and fellow crew member Volodymyr Korotkov they took the 9th place. Serhiy with helmsman Serhiy Pichuhin and fellow crew member Volodymyr Korotkov took 7th place during the 1996 Summer Olympics in Savannah, United States in the Soling. This time for Ukraine.
