= Andrew Hurst =

England international rugby union player (1935–2011)

- Full name: Andrew Charles Brunel Hurst
- Born: 1 October 1935 Cairo, Egypt
- Died: 15 March 2011 (aged 75)
- School: Dragon School
- University: University of Oxford
- Occupation: Solicitor

Rugby union career
- Position: Wing
International career
Years	Team	Apps	(Points)
1962	England	1	(0)

Andrew Charles Brunel Hurst (1 October 1935 – 15 March 2011) was an English international rugby union player.

Born in Cairo, Egypt, Hurst was the youngest son of hydrologist Harold Edwin Hurst and a descendant of Isambard Kingdom Brunel. Raised in Oxfordshire, Hurst was educated at the Dragon School and University of Oxford.

An Oxfordshire Youth Services product, Hurst played his senior rugby with Wasps and was capped once by England, as a winger against Scotland at Murrayfield during the 1962 Five Nations Championship.

Hurst was a solicitor by profession. He met his wife Bernadita Barriga on a rugby union tour to Chile.

== See also ==
- List of England national rugby union players
