= Jali Mäkilä =

Olympic sailor from Finland

Personal information
- Full name: Jali Alarik Mäkilä
- Nationality: Finland
- Born: 22 April 1965 Turku
- Height: 1.90 m (6.2 ft)

Sport

Sailing career
- Class: Soling
- Club: Turun Pursiseura
- Updated on 1 March 2020

Jali Mäkilä (born 22 April 1965 Turku) is a sailor from Finland, who represented his country at the 2000 Summer Olympics in Sydney, Australia as helmsman in the Soling. With crew members Eki Heinonen and Sami Tamminen they took the 15th place.
