= Jan Eckert =

Swiss sailor

Personal information
- Nationality: Swiss
- Born: 8 August 1964 (age 60)

Sport
- Sport: Sailing

Jan Eckert (born 8 August 1964) is a Swiss sailor. He competed in the Flying Dutchman event at the 1992 Summer Olympics.
