= Piet Eckert =

Swiss sailor

Personal information
- Nationality: Swiss
- Born: 14 August 1968 (age 57)

Sport
- Sport: Sailing

Piet Eckert (born 14 August 1968) is a Swiss sailor. He competed in the Flying Dutchman event at the 1992 Summer Olympics.
