= Flavio Grassi =

Italian sailor (born 1968)

Personal information
- Nationality: Italian
- Born: 5 November 1968 (age 57) Sanremo, Italy

Sport
- Sport: Sailing

Flavio Grassi (born 5 November 1968) is an Italian former sailor. He competed in the Flying Dutchman event at the 1992 Summer Olympics.
