= Richard Sydenham =

Olympic sailor from Great Britain

Personal information
- Full name: Richard Craig Sydenham
- Nationality: United Kingdom
- Born: 23 February 1976 (age 50) Exeter
- Height: 1.84 m (6.0 ft)

Sport

Sailing career
- Class: Soling
- Club: Royal Sydney Yacht Squadron
- Updated on 1 March 2020

Richard Sydenham (born 23 February 1976) is a sailor from Exeter, Great Britain. who represented his country at the 2000 Summer Olympics in Sydney, Australia as crew member in the Soling. With helmsman Andy Beadsworth and fellow crew member Barry Parkin they took the 12th place.
