= Claudio Celon =

Olympic sailor from Italy

Personal information
- Nationality: Italy
- Born: 19 April 1961 (age 64) Camogli
- Height: 1.72 m (5.6 ft)

Sport

Sailing career
- Class: Soling
- Club: Fraglia Vela Riva
- Updated on 29 February 2020

Claudio Celon (born 19 April 1961) is a sailor from Camogli, Italy, who represented his country at the 1996 Summer Olympics in Savannah, United States as crew member in the Soling. With helmsman Mario Celon and fellow crew member Gianni Torboli they took the 10th place.
