= Gianni Torboli =

Olympic sailor from Italy

Personal information
- Nationality: Italy
- Born: 25 December 1949 (age 76) Riva del Garda
- Height: 1.72 m (5.6 ft)

Sport

Sailing career
- Class: Soling
- Club: Fraglia Vela Riva
- Updated on 29 February 2020

Gianni Torboli (born 25 December 1949) is a sailor from Riva del Garda, Italy. who represented his country at the 1996 Summer Olympics in Savannah, United States as crew member in the Soling. With helmsman Mario Celon and fellow crew member Claudio Celon they took the 10th place.
