= Michele Paoletti =

Olympic sailor from Italy

Personal information
- Nationality: Italy
- Born: 24 March 1974 (age 51) Trieste
- Height: 1.70 m (5.6 ft)

Sport

Sailing career
- Class: Soling
- Club: Società Velica Barcola Grignano
- Updated on 1 March 2020

Michele Paoletti (born 24 March 1974) is a sailor from Trieste, Italy. who represented his country at the 2000 Summer Olympics in Sydney, Australia as crew member in the Soling. With helmsman Nicola Celon and fellow crew member Daniele De Luca they took the 14th place.
