= Daniele De Luca =

Olympic sailor from Italy

Personal information
- Nationality: Italy
- Born: 10 April 1963 (age 62) Verona
- Height: 1.72 m (5.6 ft)

Sport

Sailing career
- Class: Soiling

Daniele De Luca (born 10 April 1963), also known as Dede De Luca, is an Italian sailor, sailmaker, and business executive from Verona, Italy. He represented Italy at the 2000 Summer Olympics in Sydney, Australia as crew member in the Soling class. Racing alongside helmsman Nicola Celon and fellow crew member Michele Paoletti.

He has also competed in two editions of the America’s Cup, first as a trimmer for the Italian syndicate Italia at the 1987 America’s Cup in Fremantle, Australia. He later returned to the event as trimmer and sail coordinator of the Mascalzone Latino team during the 2007 America's Cup in Valencia, Spain.

De Luca is the founder and CEO of OneSails International and co-founder of the 69F Class.

== Honours CONI ==
Gold Medal for Sporting Merit (2015)

Gold Medal for Sporting Merit (2003)

Gold Medal for Sporting Merit (2001)

Bronze Medal for Sporting Merit (1986)

== Sailing Career Main Achievements ==
=== America’s Cup – Italia ===
- 1984–1987 – Trimmer (tailer) for the Italian syndicate Italia during preparations and competition for the 1987 America’s Cup in Fremantle, Australia.

=== Olympic Programme ===
- 2000 – Competed at the Sydney 2000 Olympics in the Soling class, finishing 14th alongside Nicola Celon and Michele Paoletti.

=== America’s Cup – Mascalzone Latino ===
- 2006–2007 – Trimmer and Sail Coordinator for Mascalzone Latino Team Capitalia during the 32nd America’s Cup.
