= Ferdinando Colaninno =

Italian yacht racer (born 1967)

Ferdinando Colaninno (born 24 January 1967) is an Italian former yacht racer who competed in the 2000 Summer Olympics.
