= Paul Davis (sailor) =

Norwegian sailor

Personal information
- Nationality: Canada

Sport
- Sport: Sailing

Paul Davis
Medal record

Representing Norway

Sailing

Olympic Games
Bronze medal – third place	2000 Sydney	Soling class

Paul Davis (born 10 February 1958) is a Norwegian sailor and Olympic medalist. He graduated from the University of Toronto Schools. He received a bronze medal in the Soling class at the 2000 Summer Olympics in Sydney, together with Herman Horn Johannessen and Espen Stokkeland. Soling world Champion 2002 with Bill Abbott Jr. and Will Abbott, Soling World champion 2009 with Bill Abbott and Joanne Abbott, Soling World champion 2011 with Peter Hall and Phil Kerrigan, Shark world Champion 2012 with Robert Davis and Brandon Tattersall, He won the 2012 Soling world championship with Peter Hall and William Hall
