= Espen Stokkeland =

Norwegian sailor

Personal information
- Nationality: Norwegian
- Born: 4 July 1968 (age 58) Kristiansand, Norway
- Height: 182 cm (6 ft 0 in)

Sailing career
- Sport: Sailing
Medal record
Sailing
Representing Norway
Olympic Games
Bronze medal – third place	2000 Sydney	Soling class

Espen Stokkeland (born 4 July 1968) is a Norwegian sailor, a world champion and Olympic medalist.

== Career ==
In 1990 Stokkeland won the gold medal in the 5.5 Metre World Championship, along with Kalle Nergaard and Kristian Nergaard.

He received a bronze medal in the Soling class at the 2000 Summer Olympics in Sydney, together with Paul Davis and Herman Horn Johannessen.

Stokkeland resides at Fornebu.
