= Herman Horn Johannessen =

Norwegian sailor (born 1964)

Medal record

Men's sailing

Representing Norway

Olympic Games
Bronze medal – third place	2000 Sydney	Sailing class

Herman Horn Johannessen (born 4 April 1964) is a Norwegian sailor and Olympic medalist. He received a bronze medal in the Soling class at the 2000 Summer Olympics in Sydney, together with Paul Davis and Espen Stokkeland. He also competed at the 1992 Summer Olympics, in the 470 class.

Outside of sports, Herman Horn Johannessen is the co-owner and manager of the company Lisa, which produces jam and squash.
