= Eki Heinonen =

Olympic sailor from Finland

Personal information
- Full name: Erkki Tapani Heinonen
- Nationality: Finland
- Born: 8 July 1967 (age 58) Vaasa
- Height: 1.94 m (6.4 ft)

Sailing career
- Sport: Sailing
- Club: HSS, HSK, TPS, ÅSS
- Class: Soling, Star, H-boat, Offshore etc.
- Updated on 27 September 2025

Erkki Tapani "Eki" Heinonen (born 8 July 1967) is a sailor from Vaasa, Finland, who represented his country at the 2000 Summer Olympics in Sydney, Australia as crew member in the Soling. With helmsman Jali Mäkilä and fellow crew member Sami Tamminen they took the 15th place.

In 2019 Heinonen became Soling European Champion with crew members Gabor Helmhout and his son Mathias Heinonen in Torbole, Italy.
