= Nicola Celon =

Olympic sailor from Italy

Personal information
- Nickname: Nico
- Nationality: Italy
- Born: 8 February 1964 Verona
- Height: 1.80 m (5.9 ft)

Sport

Sailing career
- Class: Soling
- Club: Yachting Club Torri
- Updated on 1 March 2020

Nicola Celon (born: 8 February 1964 Verona) is a sailor from Italy, who represented his country at the 2000 Summer Olympics in Sydney, Australia as helmsman in the Soling. With crew members Daniele De Luca and Michele Paoletti they took the 14th place.
