= Domingo Manrique =

Spanish sailor

Medal record

Sailing

Representing Spain

Olympic Games
Gold medal – first place	1992 Barcelona	Flying Dutchman

World Championships
Gold medal – first place	1995 Kingston	Soling

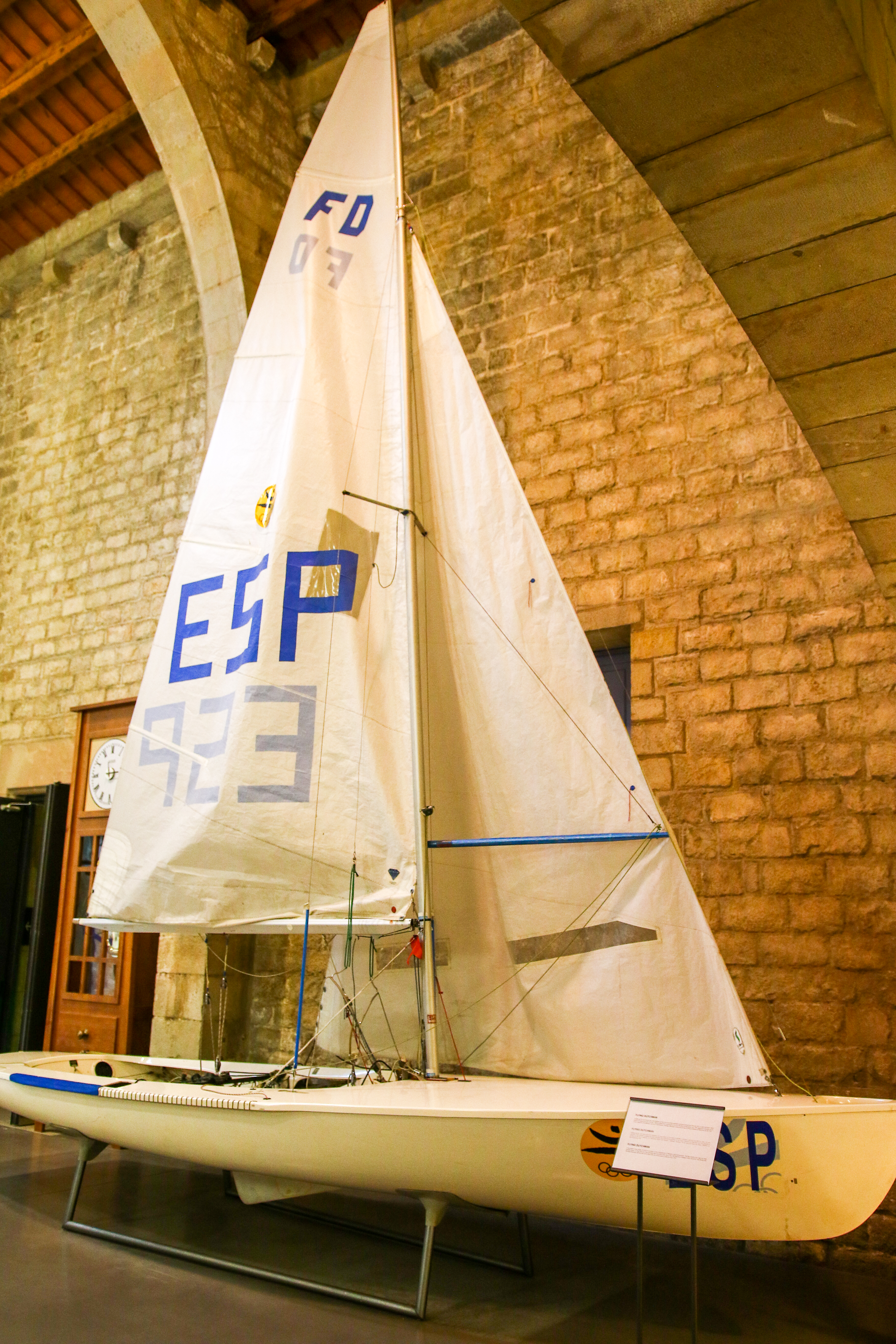
Flying Dutchman with which Luis Doreste and Domingo Manrique won at the 1992 Summer Olympics, Maritime Museum of Barcelona.

Domingo José Manrique de Lara Peñate (Note: In this Spanish name, the first or paternal surname is Manrique and the second or maternal family name is de Lara Peñate.) (born 24 February 1962 in Las Palmas de Gran Canaria, Las Palmas) is a Spanish sailor, world champion and Olympic champion.

Manrique was born in Las Palmas de Gran Canaria. He won a gold medal at the 1992 Summer Olympics in Barcelona (Flying Dutchman).
