= Volodymyr Korotkov =

Olympic sailor from Soviet Union

Personal information
- Native name: Володимир Васильович Коротков
- Full name: Volodymyr Vasylovych Korotkov
- Nationality: Unified Team, Ukraine
- Born: 15 October 1966 (age 59) Dnipropetrovsk, Soviet Union
- Height: 1.96 m (6.4 ft)

Sailing career
- Sport: Sailing
- Class: Soling
- Updated on 28 February 2020

Volodymyr Korotkov (born 15 October 1966, Born in the USSR) is a sailor. who represented his the Unified Team at the 1992 Summer Olympics in Barcelona, Spain as crew member in the Soling. With helmsman Serhiy Pichuhin and fellow crew member Serhiy Khaindravav they took the 9th place. Volodymyr with helmsman Serhiy Pichuhin, and fellow crew member Serhiy Khaindrava took 7th place during the 1996 Summer Olympics in Savannah, United States in the Soling. This time for Ukraine.
