= Philippe Presti =

French sailor (born 1965)

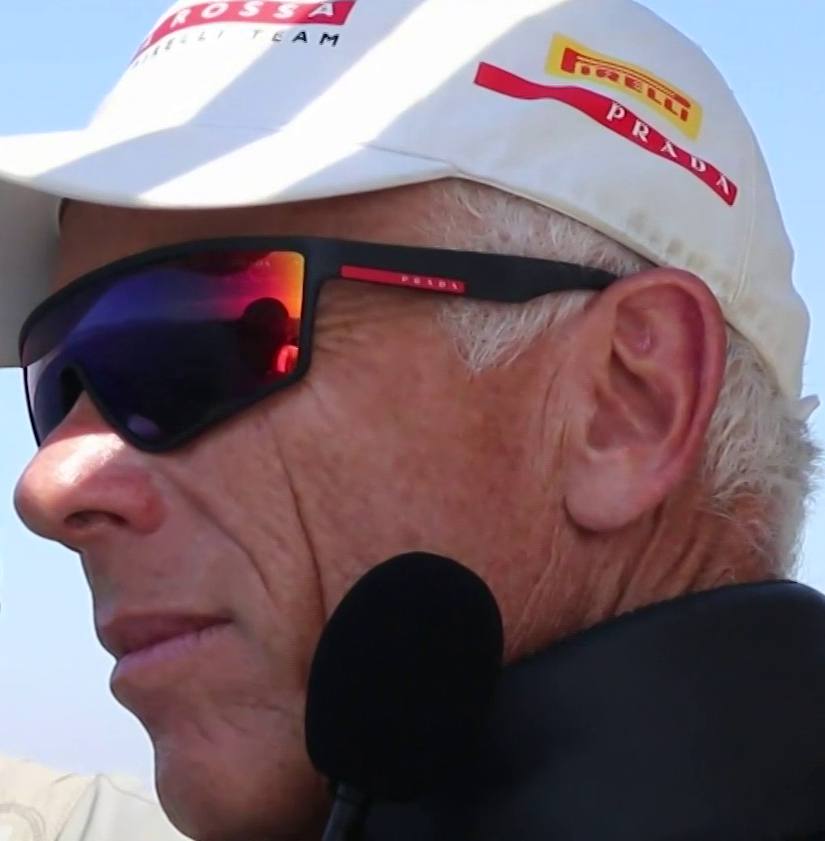
Philippe Presti

Philippe Presti (born 26 June 1965) is a French sailor. He competed at the 1996 and 2000 Summer Olympics. In 1993 and 1996 he won the Finn Gold Cup.

He sailed for Luna Rossa Challenge in the 2007 Louis Vuitton Cup.

Presti was the sailing coach for Oracle Racing at the 2013 and 2017 America's Cups and for Luna Rossa Prada Pirelli at the 2021 America's Cup and the 2024 America's Cup.
