= Mariam Mohamed Hadi Al Hilli =

Bahraini sprinter (born 1984)

Mariam Mohamed Hadi Al Hilli (born March 17, 1984) is a Bahraini Olympic athlete, who specialises in the 100 metres sprint. She was one of the two Bahraini women to participate in the Sydney Olympics in 2000 on behalf of the Middle Eastern island, the other being Fatema Hameed Gerashi. At the time of her participation in the Olympics, she held the record for her event (running) in the Persian Gulf. She began her athletic career at her high school, Ibn Khuldoon National School from which she graduated in June, 2001. She continued her education at the Royal College of Surgeons in Ireland from which she graduated in 2007.

== See also ==
- Bahrain at the 2000 Summer Olympics
