= Institute for Gulf Affairs =

Institute for Gulf Affairs (formerly the Saudi Institute) is a Washington, D.C.–based human rights advocacy group and think tank that monitors politics and education in the Middle East. Ali al-Ahmed, a Saudi Arabian scholar and a critic of the Saudi monarchy, is the director and founder.

The institute provides information, analysis and research about the Persian Gulf region and matters of international relations and politics.
