= Ali al-Ahmed =

Saudi Arabian scholar

Ali Abbas Al-Ahmed علي آل أحمد
- Born: 1966 (age 58–59); Al-Khobar, Saudi Arabia
- Occupation(s): Political activist, public speaker, scholar, writer

Ali Abbas al-Ahmed (alt.: Ali AlAhmed) (Arabic: علي عباس آل أحمد, Gulf pronunciation: [ˈʢɑli ʢɐbˈbɑːs ʔɑːl ˈʔɑʜmɐd̪]; born 1966, is a Saudi journalist and analyst focusing on the politics of the Persian Gulf region, including terrorism, Islamic movements, Wahhabi Islam, Saudi political history, Saudi Arabia–United States relations, and the history of the House of Saud family. He is the founder and director of the Institute for Gulf Affairs, formerly the Saudi Institute, an independent think tank in Washington, D.C., focused on providing analyses and disseminating information on political issues in the Persian Gulf region and particularly Saudi Arabia, and U.S.-Gulf relations. IGA also convenes conferences, conducts independent research and investigations, and works with the media and policymakers to foster a deeper understanding of Arab states of the Persian Gulf by providing them with up-to-date and exclusive information and connecting them with reliable analysts.

He has been invited to speak by Princeton University, Amnesty International, the Hudson Institute, American Enterprise Institute, and Meridian International Center.

As a journalist, Al-Ahmed exposed major news stories such as The Pentagon's botched translation of the 9-11 Bin Laden tape in December 2001. He also discovered the video of Daniel Pearl's murder.

He has testified before Congress on several occasions on civil rights and religious freedom issues in the Middle East.

He has authored reports on Saudi Arabia regarding religious freedom, torture, press freedom, and religious curriculum.

== Early life and education ==
One of ten children, al-Ahmed was born in 1966 in al-Khobar, Saudi Arabia, to a politically active Shi'a family. His maternal grandfather, Salman Abdul Hadi al-Habib, was the Sheikh of Safwa in the early to mid twentieth century until his death. His oldest uncle Ali Salman was arrested for his nationalist opposition activities in 1969-1975, and his youngest uncle Adil Salman was imprisoned for 18 months in 1991 for membership in the Socialist Workers Party.

Al-Ahmed grew up in the Eastern Province city of Safwa. His political career began at the age of 14 when he became the Kingdom's youngest political prisoner, after he was arrested in Doha, Qatar and deported to Saudi Arabia while traveling with his parents and six siblings in 1981. Ten years later, he moved to the United States to earn a B.A. in Journalism and Science at Winona State University in Minnesota and a M.A. in International Finance at the University of St. Thomas in St. Paul, MN.

Later in al-Ahmed's career, in mid-May 2012, his brother Kamel Abbas al-Ahmed was arrested in Saudi Arabia. The Arabic Network for Human Rights Information (ANHRI) believed that Ali al-Ahmed's activities as an expatriate Saudi dissident were part of the reason for Kamel al-Ahmed's arrest and that the arrest was part of a "security campaign launched by the [Saudi Arabian] government" against the 2011–2012 Saudi Arabian protests.

== Media and speaking appearances ==
Al-Ahmed is a frequent consultant to major international broadcast media on issues including Saudi political affairs, terrorism, Sunni-Shi’a relations, Wahhabi Islam, political and religious oppression, human and women’s rights in Saudi Arabia, and the Saudi-U.S. relationship. He is a regular guest on CBS News, CNN, PBS, Fox News, and Al-Jazeera. He has written for, and has been quoted in, The Washington Post, Associated Press, The Times, Reuters, The Wall Street Journal, USA Today and The Boston Globe, amongst others.

Al-Ahmed has been invited to speak at Princeton University, Amnesty International, the Hudson Institute, American Enterprise Institute and the Meridian International Center. He has testified before Congress on several occasions on the issue of civil rights and religious freedom in the Middle East and Saudi Arabia.

== Achievements ==
=== Daniel Pearl ===
In May 2002, after Wall Street Journal reporter Daniel Pearl was kidnapped and murdered in Karachi, Pakistan, al-Ahmed found a video of his beheading on an Arabic language website used to recruit jihadi-s to fight the United States. The footage of Pearl’s murder was interspersed with news clips, Arabic subtitles and calls to holy war directed at young people in Saudi Arabia, at least some of whom found the video appealing. "The first place where they had it on most of the people who commented on the tape, they said, 'I wish I was there. I wish I had done it,'" said al-Ahmed.

CBS’s decision to air parts of the videotape was criticized by Pearl’s family and the State and Justice Departments, both of whom asked the network not to air the video. Anchor Dan Rather defended CBS’s decision by saying the tape was aired after great deliberation and was carefully edited to omit the most brutal moments. "We believe," said Rather, "it is important for Americans to see it and understand the full impact and danger of the propaganda war being waged against the United States and its allies, and also its effect on the young people of the Arab world."

=== Saudi curriculum of intolerance ===
In May 2006, the Institute for Gulf Affairs and Freedom House’s Center for Religious Freedom released “Saudi Arabia’s Curriculum of Intolerance”, a report analyzing a set of 12 Saudi textbooks currently used in Islamic studies courses for elementary and secondary school students. The analysis showed that the textbooks espoused hatred toward non-Muslims and non-Wahhabi Muslims. IGA collected these textbooks, used in Saudi Arabia and Saudi-run schools outside the Kingdom, from teachers, administrators and families with children in Saudi schools.

The report debunked claims repeated earlier by Saudi officials, including spokesman Adel al-Jubeir and Saudi Ambassador to the U.S. Turki al-Faisal, that all educational materials have undergone significant revision. In stark contradiction to these claims, the IGA/FH analysis showed that the textbooks commanded Muslims to hate non-Muslims, denigrated non-Wahhabi Sunni Muslims, and Shi'ite and Sufi Muslims as "polytheists", taught conspiracy theories like Protocols of the Elders of Zion as if they were proven facts, and called upon students not to "greet," "befriend," "imitate," "show loyalty to," "be courteous to," or "respect" non-believers.

Saudi Arabia runs academies in 19 world capitals, including the Islamic Saudi Academy in Fairfax County, Virginia near Washington, D.C., that use the same textbooks. The IGA/Freedom House study was cited as evidence in the report released by the U.S. Commission on International Religious Freedom in October 2007 that urged the State Department to shut down the Academy unless it could prove it was not teaching religious intolerance. The panel expressed "significant concerns" that the school is promoting a brand of religious intolerance that could prove a danger to the United States.

== Hacking attempt ==
In 2018, a person identifying themselves as a BBC “Secretary to the Editor In Chief”, contacted al-Ahmed for an interview request. BBC later confirmed that they did not have any of that name employed, nor any such job description. An Associated Press investigation showed that it was most probably a trap to get al-Ahmed inadvertently to download spyware to his phone.
