= Fatema Hameed Gerashi =

Bahraini swimmer

Personal information
- Born: 1987 or 1988

Sport
- Sport: Swimming

Fatema Abdul Majeed Hameed Gerashi (born 1987 or 1988) is a Bahraini swimmer. She was the first woman to represent Bahrain at the Olympics.

She represented her country at the 2000 Summer Olympics in Sydney, competing in the women's 50 metres freestyle race. At the age of 12, she was the youngest competitor of any event and any nationality at the Sydney Games. She completed the race with a time of 51.15, finishing more than twelve seconds ahead of Equatorial Guinea's Paula Barila Bolopa, but was disqualified, reportedly for having wobbled on the starting blocks, which was deemed a false start despite her not having been the first competitor to enter the water.

The Times praised her "Olympic spirit" and her "brave, technically proficient race". The Guardian likewise praised her participation as conforming to "the true spirit of the Olympics". The Daily Telegraph described her as "a pioneer for Arabian Muslim women in a sport where the disrobing of the performers creates religious and cultural problems." Her participation was reportedly part of the Bahraini government's stated effort to promote "equality in sport". She was, indeed, -along with runner Mariam Mohamed Hadi Al Hilli- one of the first ever female competitors to represent Bahrain at the Olympics - although two women had previously competed for Bahrain in track and field at the Paralympic Games in 1984.

Fatema was the youngest competitor at the Sydney Olympics.

== See also ==
- Bahrain at the 2000 Summer Olympics
