= Dragon World Championship =

The Dragon World Championship is an international biennial sailing regatta competed in the Dragon keelboat class. It is organized by the host club on behalf of the International Dragon Association and recognised by World Sailing. The Dragon was a used in the Summer Olympic Games from 1948 to 1972.

== History ==
The first Dragon World Championship was held in 1965.

== Editions ==
Edition			Host			Boats	Sailors					Ref.
Ed.	Date	Year	Host club	Location	Country	No.	No.			Nat.	Cont.	Ref.
1		1965	Kungliga Svenska Segelsällskapet	Sandhamn	Sweden							
2		1967	Royal Canadian Yacht Club	Toronto	Canada							
3		1969		Palma de Mallorca	Spain		37					
4		1971	Royal Yacht Club of Tasmania	Hobart	Australia							
5		1973		Athens	Greece							
6		1975		Rochester	United States							
7		1977		Thun	Switzerland							
8		1979		Geelong	Australia							
9	6–11 September	1981		Douarnenez	France							
10	21–30 July	1983		Vancouver	Canada							
11	24 August – 1 September	1985		Douarnenez	France							
12		1987	Royal Geelong Yacht Club	Geelong	Australia	48						
13		1989	Royal Torbay Yacht Club	Torquay	United Kingdom							
14		1991	Royal Canadian Yacht Club	Toronto	Canada							
15		1993		Travemunde	Germany							
16		1995		Fremantle	Australia							
17		1997		Marstrand	Sweden							
18	11–18 December	1999		Fort-de-France	Martinique	78						
19	14–22 July	2001		Hornbaek	Denmark	77	231					
20	18–27 January	2003	Royal Yacht Club of Tasmania	Hobart	Australia	25	75					
21	19–28 August	2005		Lübeck	Germany							
22	30 Aug – 8 Sep	2007	Royal St. George Yacht Club	Dún Laoghaire	Ireland	68	205			17	5	
23	5–11 September	2009	Koninklijke Zeil- & Roeivereniging Hollandia	Medemblik	Netherlands	67	202			15	3	
24	9–15 January	2011	Royal Brighton Yacht Club	Melbourne	Australia	70	212			15	4	
25	8–13 September	2013	Weymouth and Portland National Sailing Academy	Weymouth	United Kingdom	79	237			18	4	
26	4–12 June	2015	Société des Régates Rochelaises	La Rochelle	France	80	244			22	4	
27	9–17 June	2017	Clube Naval de Cascais	Cascais	Portugal	70	219			24	4	
28	4–9 January	2019	Royal Freshwater Bay Yacht Club	Fremantle	Australia	34	105			13	3	
N/A	13–18 June	2021	Segelclub Kühlungsborn e.V.	Kühlungsborn	Germany	POSTPONED DUE TO COVID						
29	12–17 June	2022	Segelclub Kühlungsborn e.V.	Kühlungsborn	Germany	51	157			20	5	
30	25 May – 3 June	2023	Bodrum Açıkdeniz Yelken Kulübü	Bodrum	Turkey	24	76	70	6	17	5	
31	10–17 May	2025		Villamora	Portugal	50	159	148	11	25	5	
32	22-29 Nov	2027	Royal Hong Kong Yacht Club		Hong Kong							

== Multiple World Champions ==
The table below includes data up to and including 2025.

Ranking	Sailor	Gold	Silver	Bronze	Total	No. Entries (1)	Ref.
1	Andy Beadsworth (GBR)	4	1	0	5	7	
2	Simon Fry (GBR)	3	1	0	4	6	
3	Poul Richard Høj Jensen (DEN)	2	3	0	5	9	
4	Ole Børresen (DEN)	2	1	1	4	4	
5	Jamie Lea (GBR)	2	0	2	4	9	
6	Klaus Diederichs (GBR)	2	0	1	3	8	
6	Vincent Hoesch (GER)	2	0	1	3	12	
8	Erik Hermann Hansen (DEN)	2	0	0	2	2	
8	Jesper Bank (DEN)	2	0	0	2	3	
8	Ali Tezdiker (TUR)	2	0	0	2	2	
8	Bengt Palmqvist (SWE)	2	0	0	2	2	

(1) Full results are not available for every year, so this could be an underestimation.

== Medalists ==
Games	Gold	Silver	Bronze	Ref.
1965 Sandhamn	White Lady (DEN); Ole Berntsen; Ole Poulsen; Jan Berntsen	Denmark; Aage Birch	Sweden; Jörgen Sundelin	
1967 Toronto	Williwaw (USA); George Friedrichs; Gerald Schreck; Barton Jahncke	United States; Robert Mosbacher	France; René Sence	
1969 Palma de Mallorca	Aphrodite (USA); Robert Mosbacher; George Francisco III; David Saville	Australia; John Cueno; Ross Bradbury; John Shaw	East Germany; Roland Schwarz; Jörg Pfeiffer; Lothar Köpsell	
1971 Hobart	Debutante (SWE); Jörgen Sundelin; Peter Sundelin; Ulf Sundelin	Australia; Norman Booth	Denmark; Axel Holm	
1973 Athens	Crux (SWE); Roger Eliasson; Johan Palmquist; Jerry Burman	West Germany; Oldenburg; May; Meyer	Denmark; Børge Børresen	
1975 Rochester	Galejan 2 (SWE); Bengt Palmquist; Johan Palmquist; Björn Palmquist	Canada; Bob Burgess	United States; Craig	
1977 Thun	U-2 (AUT); Harry Ferreberger; Franz Eisl; Herbert Spitzbart	West Germany; Ulrich; Hofmann; Hösch	Switzerland; Wittwer; Wittwer; Wittwer	
1979 Geelong	Kirribilli (AUS); Robert Porter; Ian Porter; Robbie Antill	West Germany; Markus Glas	Australia; Barry Calvert; Tim Watts; Ted Laing	
1981 Trawemünde	Sandokan (FRG); Marcus Glas; Mucki Binder; Heiner Henwig	Denmark; Børge Børresen; Ole Børresen; Goodall	Sweden; Clander; Hansson; Nordin	
1983 Vancouver	Mistral (CAN); Bob Burgess; Nigel Brown; Shane Koreman	Australia; Ross Stiffe	Australia; Jamie Wilmot	
1985 Douarnenez	Cato (FRG); Wolf Rappel; Michael Lipp; Michael Obermeier	Potrec (FRA); Paul Aoufir; Franck Koenig; Babou Pasturaud		
1987 Geelong	Nordjyllong (DEN); Valdemar Bandolowski; Søren Hvalsø; Erik Hansen	West Germany; Andreas Lohmann; Jorg Mossnang; Paul Vestner	Australia; Stephen Boyes	
1989 Torbay	Danish Blue (DEN); Poul Richard Høj Jensen; Erik Hansen; Jan Persson			
1991 Toronto	Krystle (AUS); Stephen Boyes; Stephen Jackson; Stephen Peel			
1993 Travemünde	Senior BB (DEN); Jesper Bank; Ole Børresen; Børge Børresen	Denmark; Poul Richard Høj Jensen; Claus Høj Jensen; Sebastian Ziegelmayer	Germany; Andreas van Eicken; Rolf Schöppler; Johan van Eicken	
1995 Fremantle	Karabos VIII (AUS); Nick Rogers; Leigh Behrens; Andrew Burnett	Denmark; Poul Richard Høj Jensen; Klaus Jensen; Richard Goldsmith	Australia; Willy Packer; Peter Hay; Geoff Wedgwood; Grantham Kitto	
1997 Maarstrand	Sanne (DEN); Jesper Bank; Claus Olsen; Ole Børresen	Denmark; Poul Richard Høj Jensen	Germany; Markus Glas	
1999 Fort-de-France	Maria (DEN); Claus Høj Jensen; Bo Reker Andersen; Jes Hovgaard	Netherlands; Fred Imhoff; Richard van Ry; Sven Machielsen	Denmark; Peter Holm; Maria Holm; Søren Kæstel	
2001 Hornbæk	GER 956; Malte Philipp (GER); Torsten Imbeck; Enver Adakan	GER 947; Werner Fritz (GER); Dieter Schoen; Andreas Huber	DEN 317; Frank Eriksen (DEN); Jørgen Bonde; Ole Børresen	
2003 Hobart	GER 982 - Chrisco; Dieter Schön (GER); Vincent Hösch; Andreas Huber	AUS 180 - KARABOS VIII; Nick Rogers (AUS); Leigh Behrens; Peter Lilley	AUS 166 - Kirribilli II; David Graney (AUS); Martin Graney; Murray Jones	
2005 Neustadt	DEN 365 - African Queen; Jørgen Schönherr (DEN); Anders Kaempe; Axel Waltersdorph	GER 950 - Occasion; Harm Müller-Spreer (GER); Markus Wieser; Thomas Auracher	SUI 296 - HLL-Ariston; Vincent Hoesch (GER); Harro Kniffka; Max Scheibmair	
2007 Dun Laoghaire	GER 996 - Sinewave; Tommy Müller (GER); Vincent Hoesch (GER); Max Sheibmayr (GER)	SUI 299 - Gaudium; Ulli Libor (GER); Stephan Hellriegel (GER); Frank Butzmann (GER)	GBR 708 - Rumours; Len Jones (GBR); Claus Høj Jensen (DEN); Jamie Lea (GBR)	
2009 Medemblik	GBR 745; Poul Richard Høj Jensen (DEN); Theis Palm (DEN); Lars Jensen (DEN)	UKR 7 Lars Hendriksen (DEN); Michael Hestbæk (DEN); Sergei Pugachev (UKR)	DEN 396; Jørgen Schönherr (DEN); Axel Waltersdorph (DEN); Christian Videbæk (DEN)	
2011 Melbourne	GBR 751 - Alfie; Lawrie Smith (GBR); Timothy Tavinor (GBR); Ossie Stewart (GBR)	UKR 7 - Bunker Queen; Markus Wieser (GER); Sergey Pugachev (UKR); Matti Paschen (UKR)	DEN 266 - My-Way; Frank Berg (DEN); Søren Holm (DEN); Søren Kæstel (DEN)	
2013 Weymouth	GBR 758 - Fever; Klaus Diederichs (GBR); Andy Beadsworth (GBR); Jamie Lea (GBR)	RUS 76 - Strange Little Girl; Andrey Kirilyuk (RUS); Aleksey Bushuev (RUS); Alina Dotsenko (RUS)	UKR 7 - Bunker Queen; Markus Wieser (GER); Sergey Pugachev (UKR); Matti Paschen (UKR)	
2015 La Rochelle	UAE 8 - Bunker Boys; Yevhen Braslavets (UKR); Aleksander Mirchuk (UKR); Serhiy Timokhov (UKR)	RUS 76 - Strange Little Girl; Dimitri Samokhin (RUS); Andrey Kirilyuk (RUS); Aleksey Bushuev (RUS)	UAE 7 Bunker Queen; Markus Wieser (GER); Sergey Pugachev (UKR); George Leonchuk (UKR)	
2017 Cascais	TUR 1212 - Provezza Dragon; Andy Beadsworth (GBR); Ali Tezdiker (TUR); Simon Fry (GBR)	RUS 27 - Annapurna; Anatoly Lognov (RUS); Vadim Statsenko (RUS); Alexander Shalagin (RUS)	GBR 815 - Alfie; Lawrie Smith (GBR); Hugo Rocha (POR); Gonçalo Ribeiro (POR); João Matos Rosa (POR)	
2019 Fremantle	TUR 1212 - Provezza Dragon; Andy Beadsworth (GBR); Ali Tezdiker (TUR); Simon Fry (GBR)	GBR 820 - Louise Racing; Grant Gordon (GBR); Ruairidh Scott (GBR); Sophia Weguelin (GBR); James Williamson	GBR 819 - Fever; Klaus Diederichs (GBR); Jamie Lea (GBR); Diego Negri (ITA)	
2022	GBR 819 - Fever; Klaus Diederichs (GBR); Jamie Lea (GBR); Diego Negri (ITA)	TUR 1212 - Provezza Dragon; Andy Beadsworth (GBR); Simon Fry (GBR); Arda Baykal (TUR)	SUI 318 - 1quick1 Wolf Waschkuhn (GBR); Joao Vidinha (POR); Charles Nankin (RSA)	
2023	SUI 318 - 1quick1 Wolf Waschkuhn (GBR); Joao Vidinha (POR); Charles Nankin (RSA)	GBR 820 - Louise Racing; Grant Gordon (GBR); Luke Patience (GBR); James Williamson (GBR); Faye Chatterton (GBR)	GBR 192 - Bluebottle; Graham Bailey (GBR); Julia Bailey (GBR); Ruairidh Scott (GBR); Will Bedford (GBR)	
2025	TUR 12 - Provezza Dragon; Andy Beadsworth (GBR); Simon Fry (GBR); Enes Caylak (TUR)	SUI 355 - GINKGO RACING; Jan Eckert (SUI); Torvar Mirsky (AUS); Frederico Melo (POR)	POR 89 - SATURN; Pedro Rebelo De Andrade (POR); José Leitmann (POR); Charles Nankin (RSA)	

== See also ==
- ISAF Sailing World Championships
- International Sailing Federation
