= 2011 Dragon World Championship =

Event title
- Edition: 24th
- Host: Royal Brighton Yacht Club

Event details
- Venue: Melbourne, Australia
- Dates: 9–15 January 2011
- Titles: 1

Results
- (gold) Gold: (United Kingdom) Smith, Tavinor & Stewart
- (silver) Silver: (Germany) Wieser, Pugachev & Paschen
- (bronze) Bronze: (Denmark) Berg, Holm & Kæstel

The 2011 Dragon World Championship was held in Melbourne, Australia between 9 and 15 January 2011. The hosting yacht club was Royal Brighton Yacht Club.

== Results ==
Results of individual races
Pos	Boat name	Crew	Country	I	II	III	IV	V	VI	Tot	Pts
Gold medal	Alfie	Lawrie Smith; Timothy Tavinor; Ossie Stewart	Great Britain	1	21^{†}	7	9	7	6	51	30
Silver medal	Bunker Queen	Markus Wieser; Sergey Pugachev; Matti Paschen	Ukraine	9	5	6	4	6	25^{†}	55	30
Bronze medal	My-Way	Frank Berg; Søren Holm; Søren Kæstel	Denmark	18^{†}	17	18	1	2	1	57	39
4	Bunker Prince	Yevhen Braslavets; Serhiy Timokhov; Yevgen Kuschienko	Ukraine	12	15	1	14	17^{†}	2	61	44
5	Bunker Boys	Lars Hendriksen; George Leonchuk; Yevgen Kushchiyenko	Ukraine	20^{†}	9	3	8	15	13	68	48
6	Montana	Dirk David; Mark Bayer; Stefan Abel	Germany	14	16	2	12	8	27^{†}	79	52
7	Sinewave	Thomas Müller; Vincent Hösch; Michael Lipp	Germany	7	27	9	18	1	37^{†}	99	62
8	Scoundrel	William Packer; Denis Cullity; Julian Harding	Australia	31	1	10	6	19	45^{†}	112	67
9	Annapurna	Anatoly Loginov; Andrey Kirilyuk; Alexander Shalagin	Russia	3	18	34^{†}	15	13	19	102	68
10	Puff-eu	Richard Lynn; Ian Olson; Ron Rosenberg	Australia	4	6	20	31^{†}	14	24	99	68
11	Karabos IX	Nick Rogers; Leigh Behrens; Simon Burrows	Australia	34^{†}	7	32	3	23	4	103	69
12	Murka 12	Mikhail Mouratov; Vladimir Krutskikh; Valentin Uvarkin	Russia	22	41^{†}	8	7	29	3	110	69
13	African Queen	Jørgen Schönherr; Axel Waltersdorph; Theis Palm	Denmark	6	24	14	21	4	35^{†}	104	69
14	Murka 11	Olga White; Vadim Statsenko; Martin Liefelt	Russia	27	8	23	37^{†}	5	10	110	73
15	Quicksilver 3	Søren Pehrsson; Philipp Skafte-Holm; Rasmus Knude	Denmark	8	34^{†}	19	32	12	5	110	76
16	Out of Bounds	Jens Christensen; Kim Andersen; Anders Bagger	Denmark	2	20	12	38^{†}	31	14	117	79
17	Fiasco	Andreas Lohmann; Andreas Aigner; Jochen Schümann	Germany	DSQ 71^{†}	19	21	20	11	8	150	79
18	Bendira	Martin Pålsson; Göran Alm; Johan Norén	Sweden	11	10	4	34	21	38^{†}	118	80
19	I Feel Good	Vasiliy Senatorov; Michail Senatorov; Igor Ivashintsov	Russia	24	23	11	42^{†}	10	17	127	85
20	Flawless	Stig Lassen; Karsten Hey; Søren Hvalsø	Denmark	5	32^{†}	13	16	26	26	118	86
21	Fever	Klaus Diederichs; Andy Beadsworth; Simon Fry	Great Britain	16	25	27	35^{†}	9	12	124	89
22	Ming	Jacob Wallenberg; Carl Johan Friis; Henrik Baltscheffsky	Sweden	30	44^{†}	5	27	3	30	139	95
23	Dragoni Holly	Stephan Link; Frank Butzmann; Mucki Binder	Germany	26^{†}	28	15	17	28	9	133	97
24	Juli	Mikhail Apukhtin; Alexander Mironov; Leonid Klepikov	Russia	23	3	41	57^{†}	18	15	157	100
25	Achilles	Burkhard Keese; Alexander Krause; Joerg Moessnang	Germany	15	13	17	29	36^{†}	32	142	106
26	Chimaera	Andrew Craig; Mark Pettitt; Brian Matthews	Ireland	19	36^{†}	28	10	16	36	145	109
27	Valery	Victor Fogelson; Oleg Khopyorsky; Vyacheslav Kaptykhin	Russia	13	30	36^{†}	22	27	18	146	110
28	Wolly	Wouter ten Wolde; Martin Payne; Juliette ten Wolde	Netherlands	57^{†}	4	35	24	22	33	175	118
29	Wizzardry	Andrew York; Craig Young; Matthew Ramaley	Australia	10	22	43^{†}	28	32	29	164	121
30	Shapes	Wolf Breit; Peter Inchbold; Roger Hickman	Australia	26	2	42	60^{†}	54	7	191	131
31	Zenith	Igor Goihberg; Anatoly Kudritskiy; Dmitry Berezkin	Russia	33	39	54^{†}	2	33	28	189	135
32	Icefyre	Ronald Packer; John Longley; Edward Longley	Australia	17	45	29	13	53^{†}	34	191	138
33	Little Wolfi	Wolfgang Rappel; Klaus Jensen; Troels Lykke	Germany	29	26	24	36	25	DNF 71^{†}	211	140
34	Ridgeway Dragon	Steven Shield; Elliott Noye; Christopher Jones	Australia	51^{†}	40	22	5	35	39	192	141
35	Galejan II	Johan Palmquist; Christofer Edström; Margareta Palmquist-Carlsson	Sweden	38	12	58^{†}	40	34	21	203	145
36	Morning Glory	Hasso Plattner; Peter Alarie; David Stevenson	Germany	35	31	39^{†}	19	30	31	185	146
37	Lyla	Mark Woodland; Nigel Henderson; Matt Dundas	Australia	41	14	BFD 71^{†}	30	40	23	219	148
38	Sasha	Oleg Evdokimenko; Alexander Andrianov; Igor Skalin	Russia	40	11	45	33	20	DNC 71^{†}	220	149
39	Puff	Anthony Lynn; Mark Lynn; Lachlan Simpson	Australia	47	38	26	50^{†}	44	11	216	166
40	Versiya 3.1	Anatoly Karachinskiy; Vladislav Kapitonov; Alexey Kylov	Russia	28	35	55^{†}	25	43	41	227	172
41	Amarona	Patrik Salén; Anders Johnson; Fredrik Heijne	Sweden	42	42	31	23	38	53^{†}	229	176
42	Quicksilver IV	Robert Campbell; Matt Walker; Martyn Makey	Great Britain	49	63^{†}	16	51	45	22	246	183
43	Baikel	Dmitriy Samokhin; Yury Bozhedomov; Aleksey Bushuev	Russia	21	61^{†}	30	46	46	40	244	183
44	Sidewinder	Carl Ryves; Dick Sargeant; Kate Besley; Kevin Burnam	Australia	DNF 71^{†}	33	25	39	39	48	255	184
45	Whimsical	Gordon Ingate; David Giles; Dan Burrows	Australia	39	48^{†}	46	48	37	20	238	190
46	A P Cist	Jens Rathsack; Mario Wagner; Stephan Waak	Monaco	25	60^{†}	49	44	24	49	251	191
47	Seralia	Peje Emilsson; Thomas Kraepelien; Björn Österblom	Sweden	48	29	51	61	63^{†}	16	268	205
48	Taranui	Matthew Whitnall; Michael Bartley; James Dwyer	Australia	46	51	37	49	52^{†}	42	277	225
49	Hotspur	Kenneth Stevenson; Stephan Eyssautier; John Hay	Australia	44	54	33	58^{†}	49	46	284	226
50	Xanthos	Michael Wilkinson; Stuart Griggs; John Wearne	Australia	43	46	47	41	51	DNF 71^{†}	299	228
51	Isis	Grant Bellamy; Daniel Williams; Ben Jack	Australia	56	67^{†}	62	11	42	63	301	234
52	Leander II	David Graney; Stephen Henley; Wayne Wagg	Australia	60^{†}	58	53	26	60	43	300	240
53	Indulgence	Robert Alpe; David Seaton; Clive Jones	Australia	32	47	60	BFD 71^{†}	47	54	311	240
54	French Connection	Anthony Armstrong; Brendan Moss; David Brittain	Australia	53	43	52	45	48	60^{†}	301	241
55	Kotuku	Scott Palmer; Fraser Beer; Kim McDell	New Zealand	52	37	50	53	55^{†}	50	297	242
56	Amazing Grace	Charles Stanton; Anthony Moody; Charles Weatherly	Australia	45	55	40	52	50	58^{†}	300	242
57	Gilt Dragon II	Ian Malley; Brett Watkins; Thomas Mews	Australia	55	52	48	DNC 71^{†}	41	52	319	248
58	Merum	Raymond Chatfield; Peter Massee; Karen Chatfield	Australia	58	50	63^{†}	43	56	47	317	254
59	Aquila	Jock Young; Nicholas Griggs; Ian Ross	Australia	54	53	57	47	61^{†}	44	316	255
60	Alefanz	Horst Buhl; Silvia Barben; Ulf Hampel	Germany	59	49	44	56	65^{†}	51	324	259
61	Wild Rose	Timothy Smith; Marcus Sill; Russell Tyson	New Zealand	37	64	65^{†}	54	58	56	334	269
62	Liquidity	Damien Hannes; Richard Franklin; Steven Tracy	Australia	OCS 71^{†}	57	38	59	62	55	342	271
63	Linnea	Sandra Anderson; John Moncrieff; John Low; Ethan Prieto-Low	Australia	50	56	56	55	59^{†}	59	335	276
64	Abracadabra	Nicholas Hogg; John Marty; Brad Johnson	Australia	64	66^{†}	59	62	57	57	365	299
65	Forever Young	Gavin Moss; Terence Koo; Matthew Egan	Australia	62	59	67^{†}	65	64	64	381	314
66	Siena	Jaemie Wilson; Paul Farrell; Michael Horvath	Australia	61	65	61	66	67^{†}	62	382	315
67	Tarakona	Hugh Howard; Amanda Clark; Merella Curtis	Australia	65	62	64	64	66^{†}	61	382	316
68	ASA	Donald Blanksby; James Harland; Lionel Gonsalves	Australia	66	DNC 71^{†}	66	63	68	66	400	329
69	Dragon Lady	Amanda Jackson; Paul Jackson; Caroline Killick	Australia	63	DNC 71^{†}	68	DNC 71	DNC 71	65	409	338
70	Ghost	John Johnson; James Bacon; Derek Warne	Australia	DNF 71^{†}	DNC 71	DNC 71	DNC 71	DNC 71	DNC 71	426	355

Legend: BFD – Black flag disqualification; DNC – Did not come to the starting area; DNF – Did not finish; DSQ – Disqualified; OCS – On the course side of the starting line; † – Discarded race not counted in the overall result;
