= Soling European Championship results (2000–2004) =

Soling European Championships

Soling
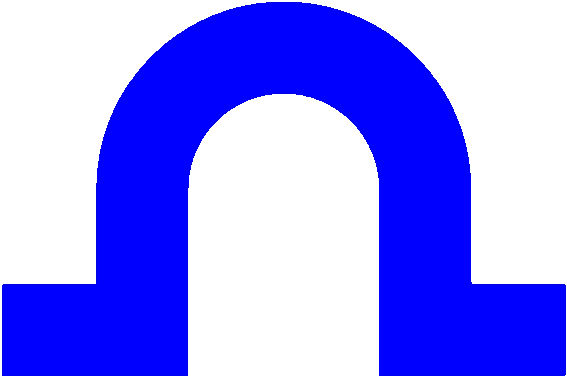

Development
- Name: Soling

The main article describes all European Soling Championships from one the first held in 1968 to the announced Championships in the near future. This article states the detailed results, where relevant the controversies, and the progression of the Championship during the series race by race of the European Soling Championships in the years 2000, 2001, 2002, 2003 and 2004. This is based on the major sources: World Sailing, the world governing body for the sport of sailing recognized by the IOC and the IPC, and the publications of the International Soling Association. Unfortunately not all crew names are documented in the major sources.

== 2000 Final results ==
2000
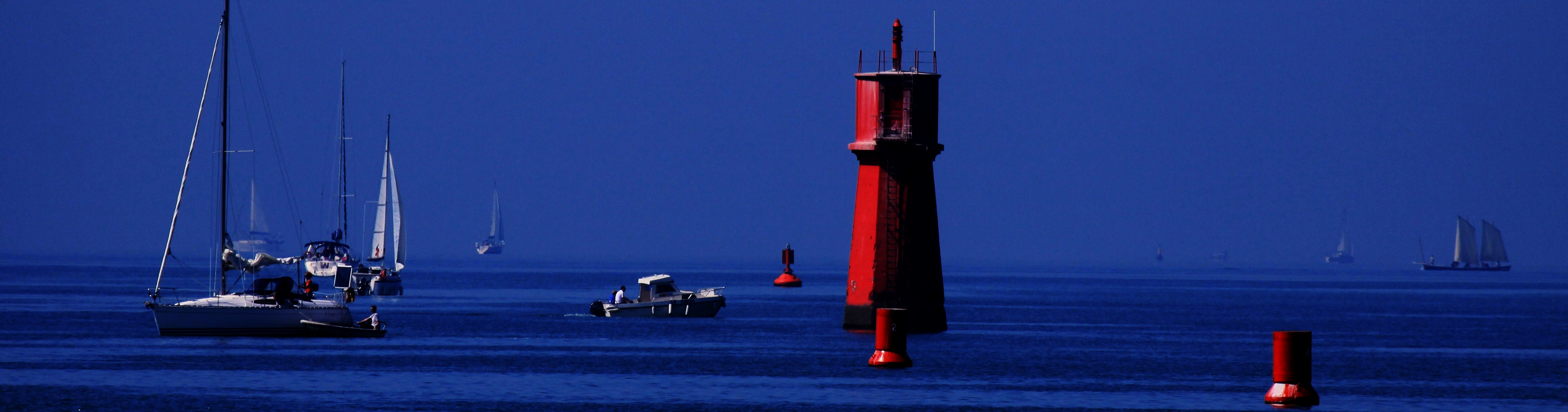

Event title
- Edition: 33
- Host: Cercle Nautique de La Rochelle

Event details
- Venue: La Rochelle, France
- Dates: 11–17 June
- Yachts: 27
- Opening ceremony: 11 June

Competitors
- Competitors: 81
- Competing nations: 14

Results
- (gold) Gold: Denmark; Jesper Bank; Henrik Blakskjær; Thomas Jacobsen
- (silver) Silver: Russia; Georgy Shayduko; Oleg Khopyorsky; Andrey Kirilyuk
- (bronze) Bronze: Ukraine; Sergey Pichuguin; Volodimir Korotkov; Sergey Timokhov

Rank	Country	Helmsman	Crew	Sail No.	Race 1		Race 2		Race 3		Race 4		Race 5		Race 6		Race 7		Race 8		Race 9		Total	Total – discard
Rank	Country	Helmsman	Crew	Sail No.	Pos.	Pts.	Pos.	Pts.	Pos.	Pts.	Pos.	Pts.	Pos.	Pts.	Pos.	Pts.	Pos.	Pts.	Pos.	Pts.	Pos.	Pts.	Total	Total – discard
1st place, gold medalist(s)	DEN	Jesper Bank	Henrik Blakskjær; Thomas Jacobsen	DEN 1	2	3	7	13	5	10	1	0	6	11.7	1	0	2	3	5	10	~~DNC~~	~~34~~	84.7	50.7
2nd place, silver medalist(s)	RUS	Georgy Shayduko	Oleg Khopyorsky; Andrey Kirilyuk	RUS 44	1	0	5	10	6	11.7	~~17~~	~~23~~	3	5.7	5	10	3	5.7	4	8	1	0	74.1	51.1
3rd place, bronze medalist(s)	UKR	Sergey Pichuguin	Volodimir Korotkov; Sergey Timokhov	UKR 1	6	11.7	2	3	4	8	2	3	10	16	8	14	1	0	~~13~~	~~19~~	2	3	77.7	58.7
4	NZL	Rod Davis	Don Cowie; Alan Smith	NZL 1	8	14	4	8	2	3	5	10	5	10	2	3	~~9~~	~~15~~	2	3	4	8	74	59
5	GER	Jochen Schümann	Gunnar Bahr; Ingo Borkowski	GER 311	4	8	1	0	1	0	7	13	13	19	3	5.7	4	8	3	5.7	~~DNC~~	~~34~~	93.4	59.4
6	FRA	Philippe Presti	Pascal Rambeau; Jean-Marie Dauris	FRA 33	3	5.7	3	5.7	7	13	3	5.7	8	14	~~10~~	~~16~~	5	10	1	0	6	11.7	81.8	65.8
7	ESP	Manuel Doreste	Domingo Manrique; Juan Luis Wood	ESP 146	5	10	~~13~~	~~19~~	3	5.7	9	15	2	3	4	8	8	14	8	14	3	5.7	94.4	75.4
8	AUT	Christian Binder	Franz Fellner; Volker Moser	AUT 124	9	15	11	17	9	15	~~21~~	~~27~~	1	0	9	15	10	16	15	21	5	10	136	109
9	ITA	Nicola Celon	Daniele De Luca; Michele Paoletti	ITA 241	7	13	10	16	~~16~~	~~22~~	14	20	7	13	7	13	11	17	6	11.7	8	14	139.7	117.7
10	DEN	Stig Westergaard	Bjørn Westergaard; Jens Bojsen-Møller	DEN 120	~~OCS~~	~~34~~	6	11.7	8	14	13	19	4	8	6	11.7	17	23	11	17	9	15	153.4	119.4
11	CAN	Bill Abbott Jr.	Matt Abbott; Brad Boston	CAN 1	12	18	12	18	12	18	6	11.7	14	20	12	18	12	18	7	13	~~16~~	~~22~~	156.7	134.7
12	FRA	Wilfried Clerton	Frederic Nielsen; Julien Bicler	FRA 17	15	21	14	20	11	17	12	18	~~21~~	~~27~~	11	17	14	20	12	18	11	17	175	148
13	GBR	Ian Williams	Mark Nicholls; Steve Mitchell	GBR 165	13	19	~~OCS~~	~~34~~	10	16	16	22	9	15	19	25	16	22	9	15	13	19	187	153
14	ESP	Gonzalo Araújo	Juan Pinacho; Fernando Morillo	ESP 128	10	16	20	26	~~DNC~~	~~34~~	4	8	12	18	DSQ	34	6	11.7	DSQ	34	7	13	194.7	160.7
15	ITA	Andrea Rachelli	Enzo Bonini; Massimiliano Ferrari	ITA 252	18	24	9	15	13	19	11	17	11	17	20	26	~~22~~	~~28~~	17	23	15	21	190	162
16	FRA	Pierre-Alexis Ponsot	Sebastien Metivier; Jerome Maquet	FRA 150	17	23	15	21	14	20	15	21	~~19~~	~~25~~	17	23	13	19	10	16	16	22	190	165
17	GER	Axel Martens	Christian Oehler; Tilo Muller	GER 309	14	20	16	22	15	21	~~25~~	~~31~~	16	22	15	21	7	13	18	24	18	24	198	167
18	GER	Hendrik Witzmann	Markus Koy; Seelig Knut	GER 293	11	17	8	14	~~22~~	~~28~~	22	28	15	21	18	24	15	21	21	27	19	25	205	177
19	GER	Christof Wieland	Gregor Bornemann; Peter Wieland	GER 30	16	22	17	23	18	24	20	26	~~22~~	~~28~~	16	22	19	25	14	20	12	18	208	180
20	SLO	Bostjan Antoncic	Andrej Borštnar; Gennadi Strakh	SLO 1	19	25	~~22~~	~~28~~	17	23	27	33	17	23	14	20	18	24	16	22	17	23	221	188
21	DEN	Nicklas Holm	Martin Leitelt; Mikkel Winston	DEN 119	~~OCS~~	~~34~~	OCS	34	21	27	8	14	20	26	13	19	21	27	19	25	14	20	226	192
22	RUS	Konstantin Starunov	Alexandre Chichke; Sergey Masalov	RUS 41	22	28	21	27	24	30	~~26~~	~~32~~	23	29	22	28	20	26	20	26	20	26	252	220
23	USA	Stuart H. Walker	Hannes Blaschke; Doug Loup	USA 842	20	26	18	24	19	25	10	16	18	24	21	27	25	31	~~DNC~~	~~34~~	DNC	34	241	207
24	NED	Bram Soethoudt	Arno Roosendaal; Jeroen Lockefeer	NED 38	21	27	19	25	23	29	18	24	25	31	23	29	~~26~~	~~32~~	22	28	22	28	253	221
25	FRA	Yves Steff	Bertrand Guillemot; Yannick L'Hellias	FRA 182	23	29	23	29	20	26	19	25	~~24~~	~~30~~	24	30	24	30	23	29	21	27	255	225
26	FRA	Herve Godest	Etienne Grenet; Frederic Bernauer	FRA 181	24	30	24	30	26	32	23	29	~~26~~	~~32~~	26	32	23	29	24	30	23	29	273	241
27	FRA	Nicolas Pecha	Vassili Pecha; Axel Corlay	FRA 153	25	31	25	31	25	31	24	30	~~27~~	~~33~~	25	31	27	33	25	31	24	30	281	248

Legend: DNC – Did not come to the starting area; DNF – Did not finish; DNS – Did not start; DSQ – Disqualified; PMS – Premature start;
Discard is crossed out and does not count for the overall result.

- 2000 Progress

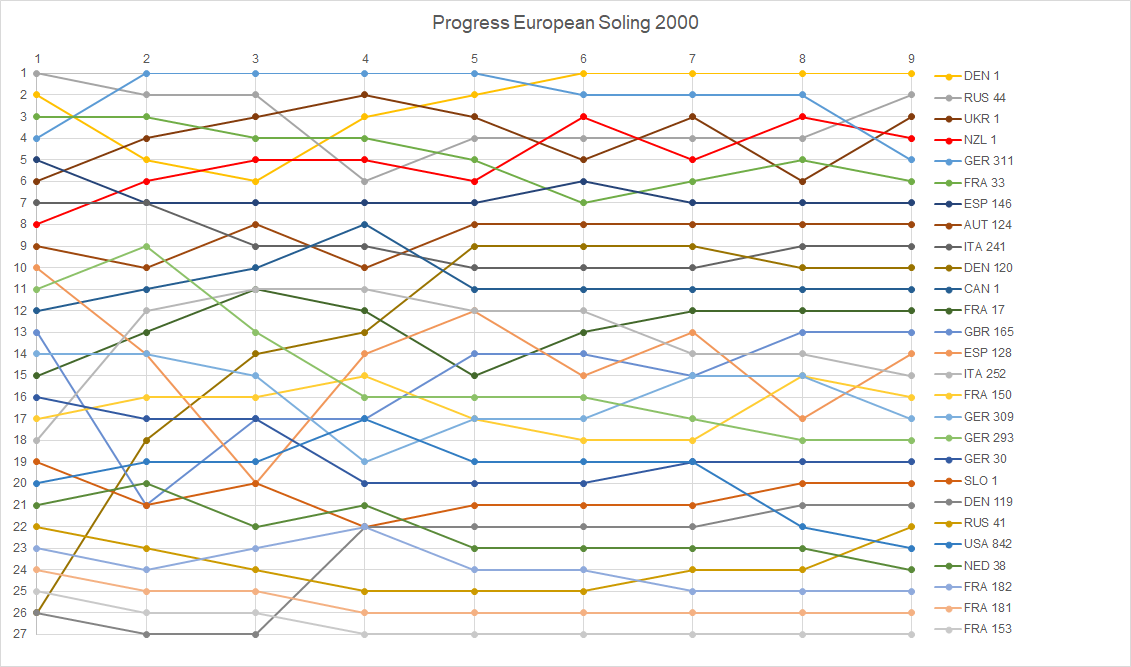

== 2001 Final results ==
2001
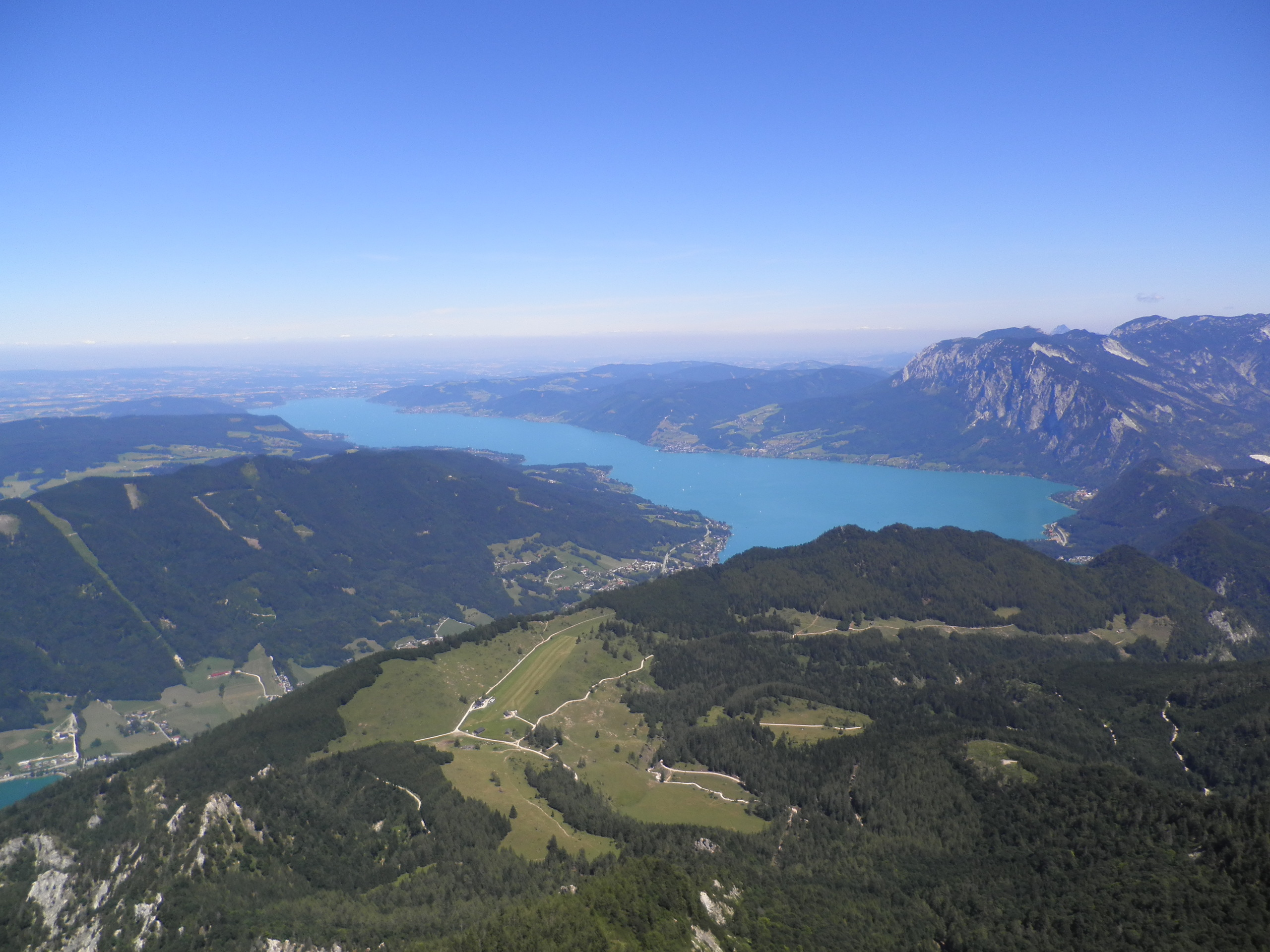

Event title
- Edition: 34
- Host: Union-Yacht-Club Attersee

Event details
- Venue: Attersee, Austria
- Dates: 1–8 September 2001
- Yachts: 31
- Opening ceremony: 1 September

Competitors
- Competitors: 93
- Competing nations: 10

Results
- (gold) Gold: Austria; Christian Binder; Nicky Fellner; Franz Panek
- (silver) Silver: Germany; Heiko Winkler; Stefan Wenzel; Jens Niemann
- (bronze) Bronze: Austria; Carl Auteried Jr. Thomas Beclin; Martin Kendler

Rank	Country	Helmsman	Crew	Sail No.	Race 1		Race 2		Race 3		Race 4		Race 5		Race 6		Race 7		Race 8		Race 9		Total	Total – discard
Rank	Country	Helmsman	Crew	Sail No.	Pos.	Pts.	Pos.	Pts.	Pos.	Pts.	Pos.	Pts.	Pos.	Pts.	Pos.	Pts.	Pos.	Pts.	Pos.	Pts.	Pos.	Pts.	Total	Total – discard
1st place, gold medalist(s)	AUT	Christian Binder	Franz Fellner; Franz Panek	AUT 124	~~11~~	~~11~~	2	2	3	3	3	3	3	3	2	2	3	3	1	1	2	2	30	19
2nd place, silver medalist(s)	GER	Heiko Winkler	Stefan Wenzel; Jens Niemann	GER 297	1	1	4	4	~~15~~	~~15~~	1	1	1	1	1	1	6	6	15	15	4	4	48	33
3rd place, bronze medalist(s)	AUT	Carl Auteried Jr.	Thomas Beclin; Martin Kendler	AUT 117	4	4	~~13~~	~~13~~	7	7	9	9	2	2	4	4	1	1	5	5	1	1	46	33
4	GER	Roman Koch	Erik Hermann; Gregor Bornemann	GER 300	5	5	5	5	3	3	4	4	10	10	2	2	8	8	3	3	~~DNF~~	~~32~~	72	40
5	HUN	György Wossala	László Kovácsi; Károly Vezér	HUN 77	2	2	9	9	2	2	4	4	~~14~~	~~14~~	6	6	11	11	7	7	8	8	63	49
6	AUT	Christoph Skolaut	Georg Skolaut; Wolfgang Riha	AUT 24	7	7	10	10	10	10	2	2	7	7	3	3	4	4	10	10	~~DNF~~	~~32~~	85	53
7	AUT	Christian Spiessberger	Ulrich Poppovic; Thomas Linortner	AUT 100	3	3	3	3	1	1	8	8	8	8	16	16	7	7	17	17	~~DNF~~	~~32~~	95	63
8	ARG	Miguel Saubidet	Cristian Petersen; Lucas Petersen	ARG 28	8	8	1	1	21	21	11	11	13	13	10	10	2	2	13	13	~~DNF~~	~~32~~	111	79
9	GER	Axel Mertens	Hubauer; Schulz	GER 309	~~26~~	~~26~~	12	12	9	9	15	15	16	16	14	14	5	5	3	3	10	10	110	84
10	AUT	Roman Hagara	Dominik Würfel; Rudolf Mayr	AUT 11	15	15	~~20~~	~~20~~	4	4	7	7	6	6	7	7	8	8	20	20	9	9	96	76
11	AUT	Markus Schneeberger	Harry Vettermann; Christian Panek	AUT 73	10	10	16	16	18	18	~~22~~	~~22~~	10	10	17	17	9	9	4	4	6	6	112	90
12	SLO	Boštjan Antončič	Gennadiy Strakh; Zeljko Perovic	SLO 1	18	18	15	15	~~30~~	~~30~~	15	15	9	9	8	8	12	12	11	11	5	5	123	93
13	NED	Johan Offermans	Nancy Schoof; Ronald den Arend	NED 25	~~20~~	~~20~~	7	7	17	17	6	6	13	13	15	15	17	17	13	13	14	14	122	102
14	AUT	Christian Feichtinger	Klaus Kratochwill; Thomas Lackerbauer	AUT 114	14	14	6	6	16	16	14	14	5	5	~~19~~	~~19~~	18	18	12	12	19	19	123	104
15	AUT	Michael Felzmann	Björn Gilhofer; Jorg Lackinger	AUT 127	~~27~~	~~27~~	8	8	8	8	10	10	22	22	23	23	20	20	6	6	7	7	131	104
16	USA	Stuart H. Walker	Goyette; Nikki Seemann	USA 842	17	17	17	17	6	6	5	5	12	12	18	18	19	19	~~21~~	~~21~~	11	11	126	105
17	HUN	Gyenese Balazs	Gyula Mónus; Gábor Meretei	HUN 1	6	6	14	14	12	12	~~23~~	~~23~~	17	17	11	11	16	16	16	16	15	15	130	107
18	AUT	Christian Nothhaft	Martin Zeileis; Patrick Wichmann	AUT 121	12	12	~~28~~	~~28~~	11	11	11	11	15	15	22	22	15	15	18	18	16	16	148	120
19	AUT	Ulrich Schuh	Stephan Beurle; Titus Werkgartner	AUT 97	13	13	19	19	22	22	16	16	~~21~~	~~21~~	9	9	13	13	19	19	18	18	150	128
20	AUT	Bernhard Klingler	Ludwig Neuner; Udo Moser	AUT 115	16	16	22	22	23	23	~~27~~	~~27~~	25	25	12	12	14	14	9	9	12	12	160	133
21	AUT	Franz Wageneder	Rudolf Rager; Georg Zeileis	AUT 116	25	25	11	11	14	14	18	18	5	5	22	22	22	22	20	20	~~DNF~~	~~32~~	169	137
22	RUS	Vitaliy Tarakanov	Alekszej Busujev; Dmitry Bondarenko	RUS 42	9	9	18	18	24	24	12	12	20	20	24	24	14	14	17	17	~~DNF~~	~~32~~	170	138
23	AUT	Peter Neumann	Simon Promok; Carli Auteried	AUT 122	~~24~~	~~24~~	21	21	19	19	13	13	24	24	21	21	23	23	24	24	22	22	191	167
24	ARG	Matias Collins	Sandrine Lescaudron; Guillermo Heinonen	ARG 30	23	23	28	28	17	17	23	23	25	25	21	21	23	23	25	25	~~DNF~~	~~32~~	217	185
25	AUT	Otto Urbanek	Mathias Kecht; Bernd Götschl	AUT 107	19	19	30	30	13	13	19	19	29	29	26	26	26	26	21	21	~~DNF~~	~~32~~	215	183
26	AUT	Margund Schuh	Markus Gnan; Ernst Felsecker	AUT 89	23	23	27	27	29	29	20	20	26	26	24	24	27	27	25	25	~~DNF~~	~~32~~	233	201
27	GER	Herbert Balzer	Gisela Balzer; Gernot Heller	GER 311	21	21	25	25	20	20	26	26	20	20	25	25	~~DNC~~	~~32~~	DNC	32	DNC	32	233	201
28	AUT	Alex Hasch	Karli Kraupa; Oskar Ginther	AUT 113	28	28	29	29	27	27	24	24	19	19	28	28	27	27	26	26	~~DNF~~	~~32~~	240	208
29	AUT	Christian Ransmayr	Johannes Lehner; Ransmayr	AUT 99	22	22	24	24	25	25	21	21	27	27	27	27	~~DNC~~	~~32~~	DNC	32	DNC	32	242	210
30	ITA	Fabio Armellini	Attilia Papini; Segala	ITA 209	~~29~~	~~29~~	25	25	26	26	25	25	28	28	26	26	28	28	28	28	24	24	239	210
31	GBR	Tony Clare	Vincetti; Not Documented	GBR 157	~~DNC~~	~~32~~	DNC	32	DNC	32	DNC	32	DNC	32	DNC	32	DNC	32	DNC	32	DNC	32	288	256

Legend: DNC – Did not come to the starting area; DNF – Did not finish; DNS – Did not start; DSQ – Disqualified; PMS – Premature start;
Discard is crossed out and does not count for the overall result.

- 2001 Progress

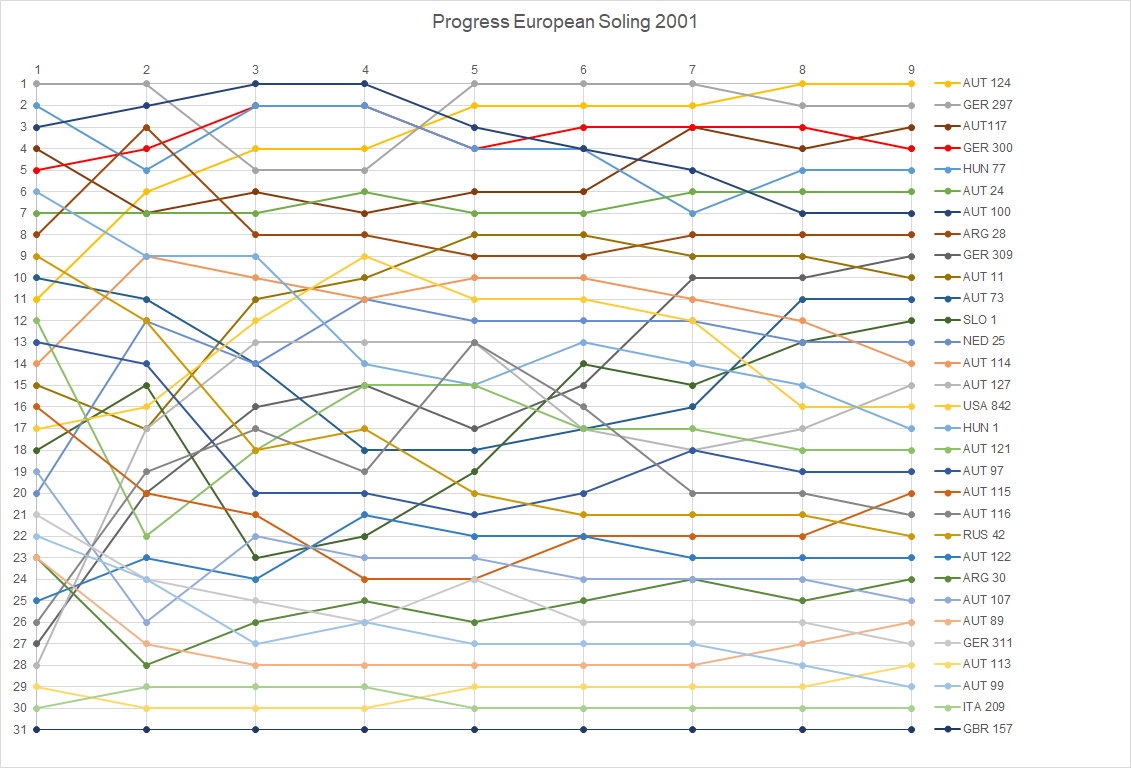

== 2002 Final results ==
2002
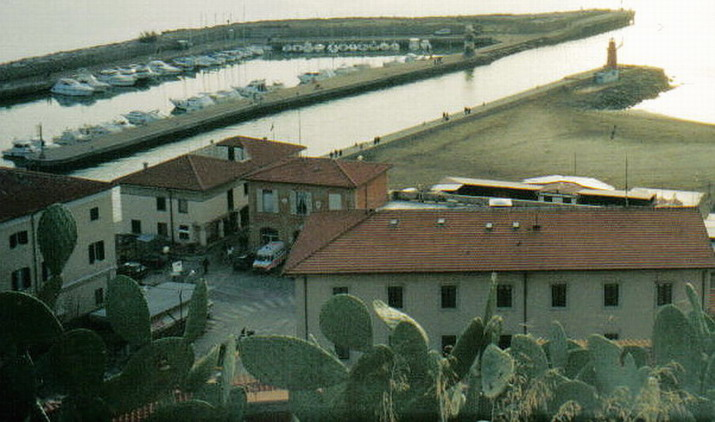

Event title
- Edition: 35
- Host: Club Velico Castiglione della Pescaia (CVCP)

Event details
- Venue: Castiglione della Pescaia, Italy
- Dates: 27 May – 1 June 2002
- Yachts: 32
- Opening ceremony: 26 May

Competitors
- Competitors: 96
- Competing nations: 10

Results
- (gold) Gold: Austria; Carl Auteried Jr. Thomas Beclin; Martin Kendler
- (silver) Silver: Austria; Markus Schneeberger; Volker Moser; Franz Panek
- (bronze) Bronze: Hungary; György Wossala; László Kovácsi; Károly Vezér

Rank	Country	Helmsman	Crew	Sail No.	Race 1		Race 2		Race 3		Race 4		Race 5		Race 6		Race 7		Total	Total – discard
Rank	Country	Helmsman	Crew	Sail No.	Pos.	Pts.	Pos.	Pts.	Pos.	Pts.	Pos.	Pts.	Pos.	Pts.	Pos.	Pts.	Pos.	Pts.	Total	Total – discard
1st place, gold medalist(s)	AUT	Carl Auteried Jr.	Thomas Beclin; Martin Kendler	AUT 117	2	2	3	3	1	1	2	2	4	4	5	5	~~DNF~~	~~33~~	50	17
2nd place, silver medalist(s)	AUT	Markus Schneeberger	Volker Moser; Franz Panek	AUT 73	3	3	4	4	2	2	3	3	~~DSQ~~	~~33~~	2	2	3	3	50	17
3rd place, bronze medalist(s)	HUN	György Wossala	László Kovácsi; Károly Vezér	HUN 77	4	4	1	1	3	3	4	4	5	5	1	1	~~DNF~~	~~33~~	51	18
4	GER	Roman Koch	Maxl Koch; Gregor Bornemann	GER 3	5	5	6	6	6	6	5	5	6	6	3	3	~~DNF~~	~~33~~	64	31
5	NOR	Preben Asbjornrod	Hans Husum; Richard Fikse	NOR 128	9	9	~~13~~	~~13~~	5	5	11	11	1	1	6	6	2	2	47	34
6	HUN	Gyenese Balazs	Gyula Mónus; Andres Monus	HUN 1	8	8	10	10	4	4	6	6	3	3	4	4	~~11~~	~~11~~	46	35
7	GER	Axel Mertens	Christian Haake; Carsten Fischer	GER 309	7	7	7	7	12	12	1	1	~~19~~	~~19~~	8	8	4	4	58	39
8	SLO	Boštjan Antončič	Zeljko Perovic; Gennadi Strakh	SLO 1	1	1	~~13~~	~~13~~	8	8	8	8	8	8	7	7	10	10	55	42
9	GBR	Tony Clare	Brian Hammersley; Philip Crebbin	GBR 156	11	11	5	5	8	8	9	9	2	2	~~12~~	~~12~~	8	8	55	43
10	BRA	Renato Cunha Faria	Sérgio Goretkin; Abílio Di Gerardi	BRA 68	6	6	2	2	7	7	7	7	17	17	11	11	~~DSQ~~	~~33~~	83	50
11	USA	Charlie Kamps	Vytas Kasniunas; Toby Kamps	USA 832	12	12	9	9	9	9	10	10	9	9	~~19~~	~~19~~	1	1	69	50
12	AUT	Murgund Schuh	Franz Fellner; Ludwig Neuner	AUT 0	~~20~~	~~20~~	16	16	10	10	17	17	15	15	10	10	6	6	94	74
13	NED	Johan Offermans	Edgar Copper; Nancy Schoof	NED 25	~~18~~	~~18~~	11	11	14	14	14	14	11	11	13	13	14	14	95	77
14	NOR	Norveel	Nilsson; Sven Kristiansen	NOR 116	10	10	19	19	11	11	15	15	~~25~~	~~25~~	16	16	9	9	105	80
15	AUT	Franz Wageneder	Rudolf Rager; Uli Hubauer	AUT 116	16	16	18	18	~~21~~	~~21~~	16	16	7	7	17	17	7	7	102	81
16	AUT	Ludwig Beurle	Ekkehart Steinhuber; Maximilian Hoyer	AUT 102	15	15	25	25	16	16	~~22~~	~~22~~	10	10	15	15	12	12	115	90
17	AUT	Christian Nothhaft	Patrick Wichmann; Martin Zeileis	AUT 121	14	14	14	14	19	19	20	20	19	19	9	9	~~21~~	~~21~~	116	95
18	NED	Bram Soethoudt	Berend Vree; Ronald den Arend	NED 38	21	21	17	17	~~23~~	~~23~~	13	13	13	13	14	14	18	18	119	96
19	GER	Heino von Schuckmann	Peter Hanke; Markus Stallhofer	GER 228	17	17	12	12	19	19	18	18	14	14	18	18	~~DNF~~	~~33~~	131	98
20	AUT	Georg Zeileis	Markus Gnan; Alex Hasch	AUT 132	~~DNF~~	~~33~~	15	15	25	25	12	12	23	23	20	20	20	20	148	115
21	NED	Rien Segaar	Marama; Bas Dusee	NED 34	13	13	20	20	20	20	~~24~~	~~24~~	18	18	21	21	24	24	140	116
22	ITA	Giuseppe Veronesi	Denis Consolati; Samuel Meoni	ITA 242	~~DNF~~	~~33~~	27	27	18	18	21	21	16	16	22	22	13	13	150	117
23	ITA	Domenico Carducci	Michele Tognozzi; Gianluca Ferraro	ITA 194	24	24	21	21	17	17	~~28~~	~~28~~	21	21	24	24	15	15	150	122
24	GER	Gernot Heller	Dirk Hensel; Umberto Valle	GER 312	~~DNF~~	~~33~~	26	26	15	15	29	29	20	20	28	28	5	5	156	123
25	ITA	Ignazio Bonanno	Arasio; Giuliano Carotti	ITA 201	19	19	~~28~~	~~28~~	24	24	19	19	24	24	25	25	19	19	158	130
26	GER	Gerhard Lwowski	Rainer Hofelich; Manfred Mittermeier	GER 249	23	23	22	22	22	22	~~27~~	~~27~~	26	26	26	26	16	16	162	135
27	GER	Herbert Baltzer	Gisela Balzer; Gerd Auserwald	GER 311	25	25	24	24	27	27	23	23	22	22	~~30~~	~~30~~	17	17	168	138
28	ITA	Alessandro Cezza	Giovanni Tognozzi; Luigi Seri	ITA 165	22	22	23	23	26	26	26	26	~~27~~	~~27~~	23	23	23	23	170	143
29	ITA	Alfio Galleotti	Ascani; Zangirolami	ITA 28	~~DNF~~	~~33~~	29	29	28	28	25	25	28	28	23	23	22	22	188	155
30	GER	Harald Voigt	Steffan Voigt; Michael Rössler	GER 127	27	27	~~31~~	~~31~~	30	30	30	30	29	29	29	29	25	25	201	170
31	GER	Keppler	Unger; Harsmann	GER 193	26	26	30	30	31	31	31	31	~~DNF~~	~~33~~	DNF	33	DNC	33	217	184
32	ITA	Fabio Armellini	Attilia Papini; Alessandro Cressotti	ITA 209	~~DNF~~	~~33~~	DNC	33	DNC	33	DNC	33	DNC	33	DNC	33	DNC	33	231	198

Legend: DNC – Did not come to the starting area; DNF – Did not finish; DNS – Did not start; DSQ – Disqualified; PMS – Premature start;
Discard is crossed out and does not count for the overall result.

- 2002 Progress

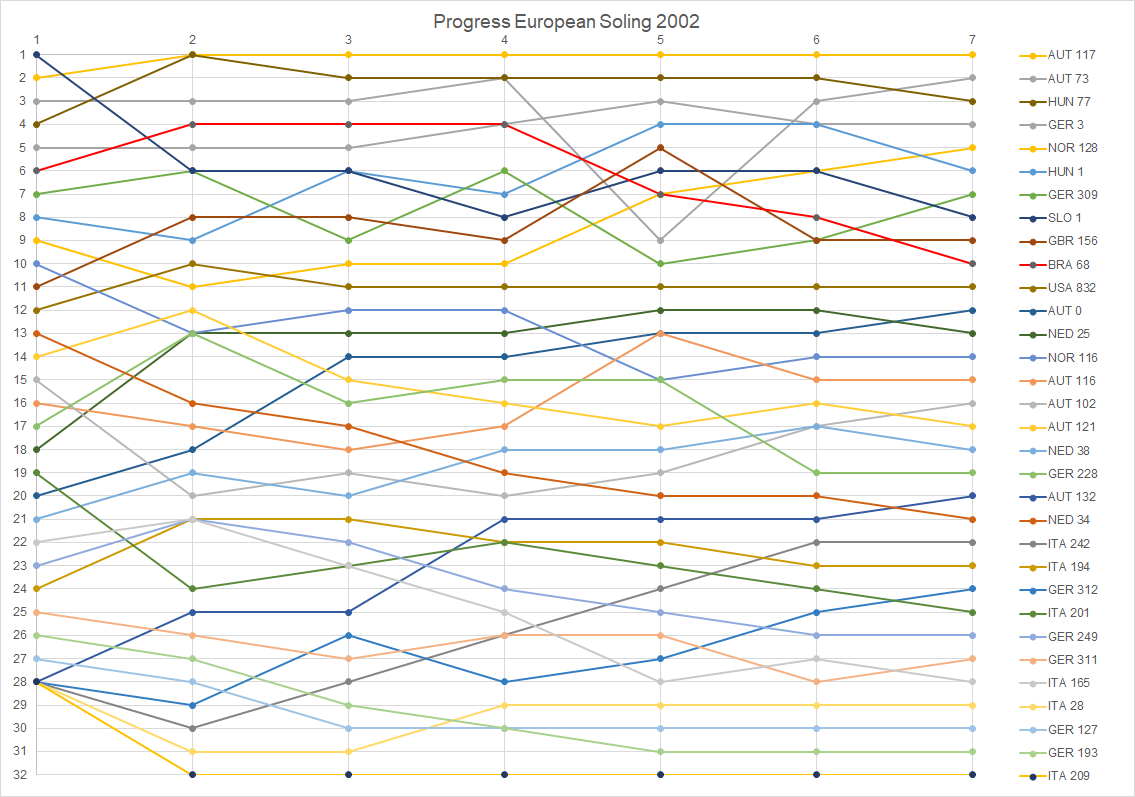

== 2003 Final results ==
2003
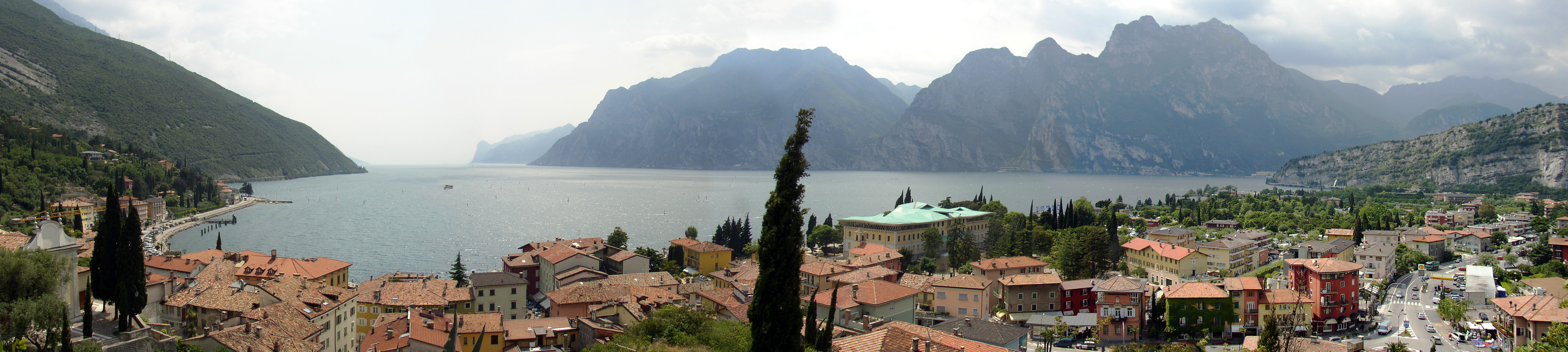

Event title
- Edition: 36
- Host: Circolo Vela Torbole

Event details
- Venue: Torbole, Italy
- Dates: 31 August – 4 September
- Yachts: 24
- Opening ceremony: 30 August

Competitors
- Competitors: 72
- Competing nations: 10

Results
- (gold) Gold: Hungary; Gyenese Balázs; Gyula Mónus; Károly Vezér
- (silver) Silver: Germany; Roman Koch; Maxl Koch; Gregor Bornemann
- (bronze) Bronze: Germany; Karl Haist; Jacob Carsten; Daniel Diesing

Rank	Country	Helmsman	Crew	Sail No.	Race 1		Race 2		Race 3		Race 4		Race 5		Race 6		Race 7		Total	Total – discard
Rank	Country	Helmsman	Crew	Sail No.	Pos.	Pts.	Pos.	Pts.	Pos.	Pts.	Pos.	Pts.	Pos.	Pts.	Pos.	Pts.	Pos.	Pts.	Total	Total – discard
1st place, gold medalist(s)	HUN	Gyenese Balázs	Gyula Mónus; Károly Vezér	HUN 1	2	2	3	3	~~7~~	~~7~~	1	1	2	2	5	5	3	3	23	16
2nd place, silver medalist(s)	GER	Roman Koch	Maxl Koch; Gregor Bornemann	GER 300	~~9~~	~~9~~	9	9	2	2	5	5	1	1	1	1	2	2	29	20
3rd place, bronze medalist(s)	GER	Karl Haist	Jacob Carsten; Daniel Diesing	GER 308	1	1	1	1	~~10~~	~~10~~	3	3	5	5	10	10	7	7	37	27
4	HUN	György Wossala	László Kovácsi; Pepe Németh	HUN 77	3	3	5	5	~~16~~	~~16~~	7	7	6	6	7	7	1	1	45	29
5	AUT	Markus Schneeberger	Christian Panek; Harry Vettermann	AUT 73	5	5	12	12	~~15~~	~~15~~	2	2	4	4	2	2	5	5	45	30
6	SLO	Boštjan Antončič	Gennadi Strakh; Zeljko Perovic	SLO 1	~~11~~	~~11~~	2	2	3	3	11	11	10	10	6	6	6	6	49	38
7	BRA	Renato Cunha Faria	Marco Lagoa; Daniel Santiago	BRA-68	~~17~~	~~17~~	13	13	1	1	14	14	3	3	4	4	4	4	56	39
8	AUT	Franz Urlesberger	Udo Moser; Volker Moser	AUT 124	10	10	~~11~~	~~11~~	5	5	4	4	9	9	3	3	9	9	51	40
9	AUT	Thomas Jacobowitz	Ulrich Miller; Bernhard Klingler	AUT 1	4	4	~~14~~	~~14~~	12	12	6	6	7	7	9	9	8	8	60	46
10	USA	Stuart H. Walker	Chris Brown; Doug Loup	USA 842	13	13	6	6	13	13	8	8	~~15~~	~~15~~	8	8	12	12	75	60
11	SVK	Peter Mosný	Anton Szomolányi; Marek Jankovic	SVK 1	6	6	~~DSQ~~	~~25~~	8	8	13	13	8	8	13	13	13	13	86	61
12	DEN	Frank Højlund Lavrsen	Poul Andreasen; Carsten Odby Moesgaard	DEN 112	14	14	7	7	9	9	10	10	~~17~~	~~17~~	12	12	10	10	79	62
13	NED	Bram Soethoudt	Geert Verheij; Gilbert Figaroa	NED 38	7	7	~~20~~	~~20~~	4	4	15	15	12	12	17	17	14	14	89	69
14	AUT	Georg Zeileis	Markus Gnan; Felix Hasch	AUT 132	8	8	10	10	14	14	9	9	13	13	~~15~~	~~15~~	15	15	84	69
15	AUT	Franz Wageneder	Rudi Hubauer; Rudolf Rager	AUT 116	12	12	4	4	11	11	12	12	20	20	16	16	~~DNF~~	~~25~~	100	75
16	AUT	Christian Nothhart	Martin Zeileis; Patrick Wichmann	AUT 121	~~19~~	~~19~~	16	16	18	18	16	16	16	16	11	11	11	11	107	88
17	ITA	Domenico Carducci	Gianluca Ferraro; Paolo Mazzarri	ITA 254	18	18	15	15	6	6	17	17	~~22~~	~~22~~	18	18	19	19	115	93
18	AUT	Alex Hasch	Johannes Egger; Bernhard Kreutzer	AUT 113	15	15	17	17	~~22~~	~~22~~	21	21	11	11	14	14	16	16	116	94
19	NED	Rien Segaar	Wistie Brown; Hans Zijstra	NED 34	16	16	8	8	17	17	20	20	21	21	~~23~~	~~23~~	18	18	123	100
20	ITA	Michele Tognozzi	Leonardo Saletti; Giuliano Carotti	ITA 194	~~21~~	~~21~~	18	18	19	19	19	19	14	14	20	20	17	17	128	107
21	ITA	Fabio Armellini	Renzo Segala; Attilia Papini	ITA 209	22	22	21	21	~~DNF~~	~~25~~	18	18	18	18	21	21	20	20	145	120
22	HUN	Istran Szucs	Peter Szucs; Gabor Gyulai	HUN 53	~~23~~	~~23~~	22	22	20	20	23	23	19	19	19	19	22	22	148	125
23	GER	Harald Voigt	Günter Schober; Gerald Zanner	GER 127	~~24~~	~~24~~	19	19	23	23	22	22	24	24	22	22	21	21	155	131
24	GER	Andreas Münnichow	Nils Niescken; Benedict Hohnke	GER 316	20	20	~~DNF~~	~~25~~	21	21	24	24	23	23	DNF	25	DNC	25	163	138

Legend: DNC – Did not come to the starting area; DNF – Did not finish; DSQ – Disqualified;
Discard is crossed out and does not count for the overall result.

- 2003 Progress

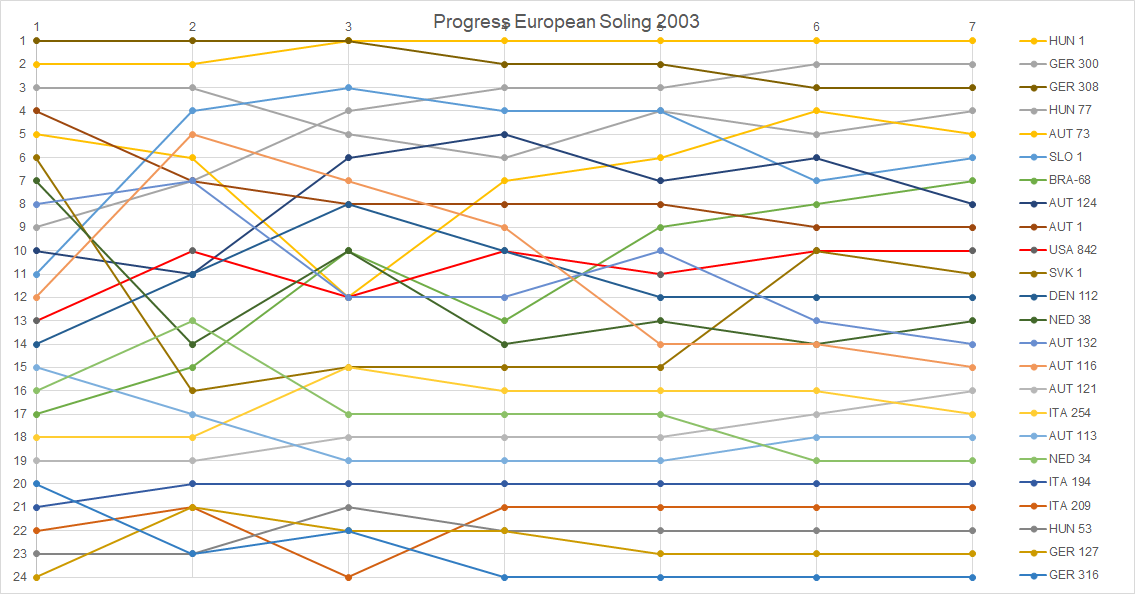

== 2004 Final results ==
2004
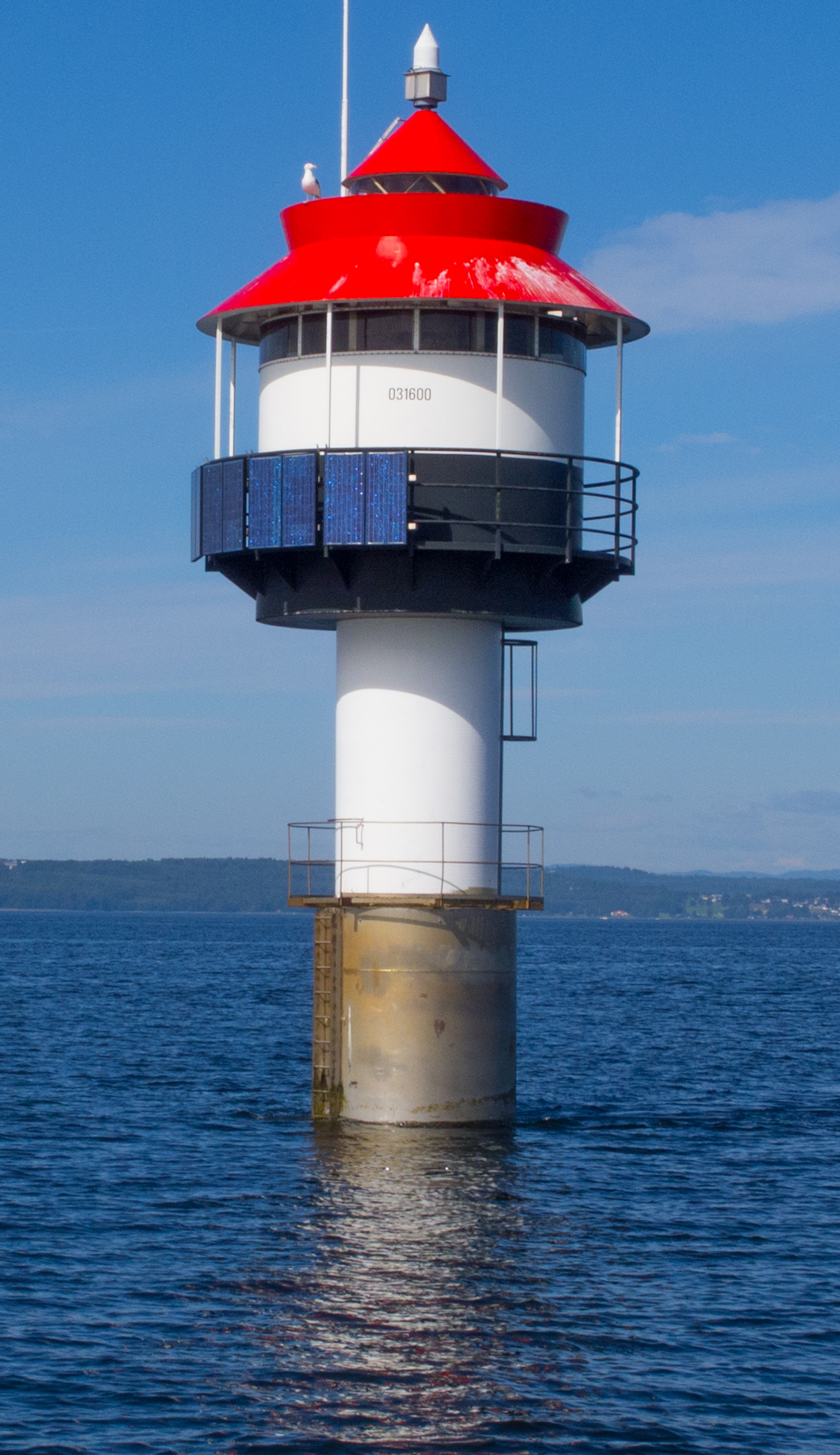

Event title
- Edition: 37
- Host: Tønsberg Seilforening

Event details
- Venue: Tønsberg, Norway
- Dates: 2–8 August
- Yachts: 20
- Opening ceremony: 2 August

Competitors
- Competitors: 60
- Competing nations: 9

Results
- (gold) Gold: Austria; Markus Schneeberger; Volker Moser; Christian Panek
- (silver) Silver: Slovenia; Boštjan Antončič; Gennadi Strakh; Zeljko Perovic
- (bronze) Bronze: Norway; Pål Christoffersen; Karl Book; Espen Kamperhaug

Rank	Country	Helmsman	Crew	Sail No.	Race 1		Race 2		Race 3		Race 4		Race 5		Race 6		Total	Total – discard
Rank	Country	Helmsman	Crew	Sail No.	Pos.	Pts.	Pos.	Pts.	Pos.	Pts.	Pos.	Pts.	Pos.	Pts.	Pos.	Pts.	Total	Total – discard
1st place, gold medalist(s)	AUT	Markus Schneeberger	Volker Moser; Christian Panek	AUT 73	1	1	2	2	~~10~~	~~10~~	1	1	2	2	4	4	20	10
2nd place, silver medalist(s)	SLO	Boštjan Antončič	Gennadi Strakh; Zeljko Perovic	SLO 1	3	3	6	6	1	1	6	6	~~14~~	~~14~~	2	2	32	18
1st place, gold medalist(s)	NOR	Pål Christoffersen	Karl Book; Espen Kamperhaug	NOR 142	~~8~~	~~8~~	1	1	6	6	5	5	3	3	6	6	29	21
4	HUN	Gyenese Balázs	Gyula Mónus; Karl Sloane	HUN 1	2	2	4	4	8	8	3	3	5	5	~~13~~	~~13~~	35	22
5	NOR	Dag Usterud	Arne Ottestad; Eskil Goldeng	NOR 133	7	7	~~10~~	~~10~~	7	7	4	4	4	4	1	1	33	23
6	GER	Roman Koch	Maxl Koch; Gregor Bornemann	GER 300	~~10~~	~~10~~	8	8	4	4	2	2	1	1	17	17	42	25
7	NED	Johan Offermans	Hans Zijlstra; Bas Dusee	NED 25	6	6	5	5	3	3	~~8~~	~~8~~	8	8	3	3	33	25
8	NOR	Asbjørn Kristiansen	Petter Høglund; Lars Ronny Henriksen	NOR 140	5	5	3	3	12	12	7	7	11	11	~~DNS~~	~~21~~	59	38
9	CAN	Peter Allen	Karl Anderson; Magnus Liljedahl	CAN 848	4	4	~~15~~	~~15~~	11	11	10	10	6	6	11	11	57	42
10	NOR	Ole Schoyen	Kjell Magdahl; Henrich Henriksen	NOR 138	12	12	~~16~~	~~16~~	2	2	9	9	12	12	12	12	63	47
11	NOR	Pål Kristiansen	Torben von Huth; Elisabeth Sedivy	NOR 141	~~16~~	~~16~~	13	13	5	5	11	11	10	10	8	8	63	47
12	NED	Bram Soethoudt	Gilbert Figaroa; Geert Verheij	NED 38	9	9	7	7	9	9	13	13	~~18~~	~~18~~	10	10	66	48
13	SWE	Anders Åhman	Mikael Lindh; Johan Brauer	SWE 138	~~17~~	~~17~~	12	12	13	13	16	16	7	7	7	7	72	55
14	GER	Jan Carl Kochen	Bernt Deertz; Alexander Holl	GER 267	14	14	9	9	14	14	~~15~~	~~15~~	15	15	5	5	72	57
15	DEN	Frank Højlund Lavrsen	Poul Andreasen; Carsten Odby Moesgaard	DEN 112	13	13	~~18~~	~~18~~	16	16	12	12	13	13	9	9	81	63
16	NED	Rien Segaar	Robbert de Jong; Gabor Helmhoudt	NED 34	11	11	11	11	17	17	14	14	~~16~~	~~16~~	14	14	83	66
17	NOR	Arvid Rove	Kjell Christian Børresen; Øyvind Thuresson	NOR 122	15	15	14	14	15	15	~~DSQ~~	~~21~~	9	9	16	16	90	69
18	NOR	Bjornar Erikstad	Linda Emilie Svendsen; Sigurd Spæren	NOR 115	18	18	17	17	~~20~~	~~20~~	17	17	17	17	15	15	104	84
19	NOR	Finn Engelsen	Magnus Henrik; Fredrik Rosenberg	NOR 100	19	19	19	19	19	19	18	18	~~20~~	~~20~~	18	18	113	93
20	NOR	Tor Firing	Knut Firing; Julie Firing	NOR 135	~~20~~	~~20~~	20	20	18	18	19	19	19	19	19	19	115	95

Legend: DNC – Did not come to the starting area; DNF – Did not finish; DSQ – Disqualified;
Discard is crossed out and does not count for the overall result.

- 2004 Progress

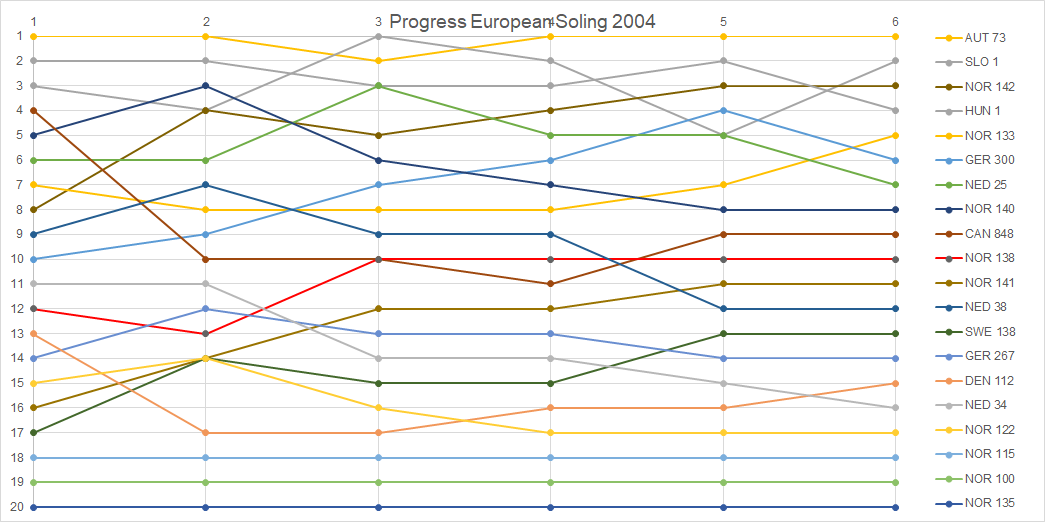

== Further results ==
For further results see:

- Soling European Championship results (1968–1979)
- Soling European Championship results (1980–1984)
- Soling European Championship results (1985–1989)
- Soling European Championship results (1990–1994)
- Soling European Championship results (1995–1999)
- Soling European Championship results (2000–2004)
- Soling European Championship results (2005–2009)
- Soling European Championship results (2010–2014)
- Soling European Championship results (2015–2019)
- Soling European Championship results (2020–2024)
