= Palmquist =

Palmquist, Palmqvist or Palmkvist is a Swedish surname. Notable people with the surname include:

Palmquist

- Bengt Palmquist (1923–1995), Swedish sailor
- Björn Palmquist, Swedish sailor, son of Bengt
- Ed Palmquist (1933–2010), American baseball pitcher
- Gustaf Palmquist (1812–1867), Swedish Baptist pioneer
- Hans Palmquist (born 1967), Swedish association football defender
- Johan Palmquist, Swedish sailor, son of Bengt, brother of Björn
- Oscar Palmquist (born 1963), Brazilian member of the World Scout Committee
- Zach Palmquist (born 1990), American ice hockey defenseman
- Stephen Palmquist, Kantian philosopher

Palmqvist

- Arne Palmqvist (1921–2003), Swedish theologian
- Bengt-Olov Palmqvist, Swedish-Australian musicologist and music theorist
- Björn Palmqvist (born 1944), Swedish ice hockey player
- Jenny Palmqvist (born 1969), South Korean–born Swedish association football referee
- Lars Palmqvist, Swedish orienteering competitor
- Per Palmqvist (1815–1887), Swedish Baptist pioneer, brother of Gustaf Palmquist
- Wäinö Palmqvist (1882–1964), Finnish architect

== See also ==
- Palmqvist method
