= Børresen =

Børresen is a surname. Notable people with the surname include:

- Arne Børresen (1907–1947), Norwegian footballer
- Børge Børresen (1919–2007), Danish sailor
- Erik Børresen (1785–1860), Norwegian ship owner, merchant and philanthropist
- Geir Børresen (1942–2022), Norwegian actor and entertainer
- Hakon Børresen (1876–1954), Danish composer
- Hans Peter Børresen (1825–1901), Danish missionary
- Ida Børresen (born 1950), Norwegian civil servant
- Nils Elias Børresen (1812–1863), Norwegian politician
- Odd Børresen (1923–2010), Norwegian linguist, preacher, and missionary
- Ole Børresen, Danish sailor
- Urban Jacob Rasmus Børresen (1857–1943), Norwegian rear admiral and industry leader
