= Swan 45 World Championship =

World Championship in the Swan 45 Class

The Swan 45 World Championship is an annual international sailing regatta for Swan 45 One Design built by Nautor Swan, they are organized by the host club on behalf of the International Swan 45 Class Association and recognized by World Sailing, the sports IOC recognized governing body. The event was often held as part of multiple class events such as Swan's own brand regattas and pinnacle yachting events.

== Events ==
Ed.	Year	Host			Participant				Ref
Ed.	Year	Host club	Location	Nat.	Boats	Sailors	Nations	Cont.	Ref
1	2006; Part of Key West Regatta		Key West	United States	16		4+	3+	
2	2007-07-02 to 07-08	Royal Yacht Squadron	Cowes	United Kingdom	21	242	13	3	
3	2008; Part of the Swan Gold Cup	Yacht Club Costa Smeralda	Porto Cervo	Italy	22		10+	3+	
4	2009-08-31 to 09-04	Circolo Nautico e della Vela Argentario	Argentario	Italy	17	204	16	5	
5	2010; Part of the Swan Gold Cup	Yacht Club Costa Smeralda	Porto Cervo	Italy	9		6+	2+	
	2011	NOT HELD							
6	2012	Yacht Club Costa Smeralda	Porto Cervo	Italy	8		3+	1+	
7	2013	Royal Yacht Squadron	Cowes	United Kingdom	8	93	5	2	
8	2014; Part of the Swan Gold Cup	Yacht Club Costa Smeralda	Porto Cervo	Italy	8	92	9	2	
9	2015	Royal Yacht Squadron	Cowes	United Kingdom	8	91	9	3	
10	2016; Part of the Swan Gold Cup	Yacht Club Costa Smeralda	Porto Cervo	Italy	16		7+	2+	
11	2017	Reial Club Nàutic de Palma	Palma	Spain	8	91	9	3	
12	2018	Yacht Club Costa Smeralda	Porto Cervo	Italy					
13	2019	Club Nautico Scarlino	Scarlino	Italy					
14	2020	Club Nautico Scarlino	Scarlino	Italy					
15	2021		Saint Tropez	France	8	97	10	2	
N/A	2022		Valancia	Spain	CLASS NOT INCLUDED				

== Multiple World Champions ==
Ranking	Sailor	Gold	Silver	Bronze	Total	No. Entries	Ref.

== Medalists ==
Games	Gold	Silver	Bronze	Ref.
2006 Key West; 16 Boats	USA - Bellicosa Sailing Team; Massimo Ferragamo (ITA)	ITA - DSK-Comifin Sailing Team; Danilo Salsi (ITA)	USA 45454 - Goombay Smash Sailing Team; William Douglass (USA)	
2007 Cowes; 21 Boats	USA 52059 - Plenty Sailing Team Alexander Roepers (USA); Chris Larson (USA); Nat Spencer (USA); Sean Horrigan (USA); Scott Martin (USA); Darren Jones (AUS); Alex Turner (USA); Curtis Florence (CAN); Steve Inman (USA); Chuck Norris (USA); Katie Mims (USA)	USA 45454 - Goombay Smash Sailing Team; William Douglass (USA)	GBR 945R - Fever Sailing Team; Klaus Diederichs (GER); Grant Gordon (GBR)	
2008 Porto Cervo; 21 Boats	GER 5245 - Earlybird Sailing Team; Christian Nagel (GER); Hendrik Brandis (GER)	GBR 945R - Fever Sailing Team; Klaus Diederichs (GER); Grant Gordon (GBR)	ITA 45019 - Atlantica Sailing Team; Carlo Perrone (ITA)	
2009 Argentario; 17 Boats	NED7465 - CHARISMA (45/044) Nico Poons (NED); Menthe De Jong (NED); Joost Aapkes (NED); Gilbert Figaroa (NED); Geert Van De Weg (NED); Rens Van Arkel (NED); Ivan Peute (NED); Rasmus Winston Rasmussen (DEN); Nick Bonner (GBR); Reggie Cole (USA); Ray Davies (NZL)	NED8888 - NO LIMITS (45/051) Rientz Bol (NED)	GER5245 - EARLYBIRD Christian Nagel (GER); Hendrik Brandis (GER)	
2010 Porto Cervo; 9 Boats	GER 5245 - EARLYBIRD (4) Christian Nagel (GER); Hendrik Brandis (GER)	FIN 10390 - BLUE NIGHTS (2) Tea Ekengrensauren (FIN)	BEL 4528 - SAMANTAGA - DUVEL (7) Philippe Moorgat (BEL); Patrick Van Henr (BEL)	
2011	NOT HELD			
2012 Porto Cervo; 8 Boats	GER 5245 Earlybird Sailing Team Christian Nagel (GER); Hendrik Brandis (GER)	ITA 14694 - Talj Sailing Team Vittorio Ruggiero (ITA)	ITA 15000 - Swanted{ Stefano Piccolo (ITA)	
2013 Cowes; 8 Boats	BEL 4528 - SAMANTAGA Philippe Moortgat (BEL); Patrick Van Heurck (BEL); Philippe Bergmans (BEL); Koen De Smedt (BEL); Pim Peters (BEL); Veronique Van Der Werff (BEL); Bert Schandevyl (BEL); Dries Van Den Abbeele (BEL); Bart Verwerft (BEL); Christiaan Weeda (NED); Gosse De Boer (NED); Gregor Vlasblom (NED)	ITA 14519 - VANUDEN Harm Tiddens (NED)	GBR 45R - WISC Glynn Williams (GBR)	
2014 Porto Cervo; Boats	GER 5245 - Earlybird Sailing Team Hendrik Brandis (GER); Md Mählmann (GER); Julian Hampe (GER); Jochen Schuermann (GER); Juan Luis Paez (ESP); Luke Molloy (AUS); Arnd Howar (GER); Carl Von Schumann (GER); Dennis Fricke (GER); Arne Wilcken (GER); Volker Kramer (GER); Daniel Zenker (GER)	GER 6845 - Elena Nova Christian Plump (GER)	NED 8888 - No Limits; R. W. Bol (NED)	
2015 Cowes; 8 Boats	ITA 14519 - VanUDEN; Benodet Stichting (ITA)	NED 14545 - Motions; Lennard Van Oeveren (NED)	GER 5245 - Earlybird Sailing Team; Hendrik Brandis (GER)	
2016 Porto Cervo; 16 Boats	GER 6845 - Elena Nova; Christian Plump (GER)	NED 8888 - ESTHEC; R. W. Bol (NED)	GER 5245 - EARLYBIRD; Dr. Hendrik Brandis (GER)	
2017 Palma; 9 Boats	ESP Porrón IX; Luís Senís (ESP)	NED Motions; Lennard Van Oeveren (NED)	ITA Aphrodite; Pier Drancesco di Giuseppe (ITA)	
2018 Porto Cervo; 9 Boats	ESP 10222 - PORRON IX; Luis Senus (ESP)	GER 6845 - Elena Nova; Christian Plump (GER)	NED 14545 - Motions; Lennard Van Oeveren (NED)	
2019; 7 Boats	Fever; Klaus Diederichs (GER)	Motions; Lennard van Oeveren (NED)	Blue Nights; Tea Ekengren-Sauren (FIN)	
2020 Scarlino; 5 Boats Lennard van Oeveren (NED)	NED 18 - K-Force; Jan de Kraker (NED)	SUI 15000 - Ange Trasparent; Valter Pizzoli (SUI)	NED 14545 - Motions	
2021; 8 Boats	NED 14545 - MOTIONS Lennard van Oeveren (NED); Bas Boterman (NED); Jes Gram-Hansen (DEN); Verena Jongepier (NED); Kent Jørgensen (DEN); Nicander Lauwaars (NED); Jochem Schoorl (NED); Robin Segaar (NED); Ko Stroo (NED); Jelmer van Beek (NED); Jorden van Rooijen (NED); Koen Verhaeghe de Naeyer (NED)	ARG 5835 - FROM NOW ON Fernando Chain (ARG)	GBR 945R - FEVER Klaus Diederichs (GBR)	
2022	NOT HELD			
