= Sailing at the 1992 Summer Olympics =

Sailing at the Games of the XXV Olympiad
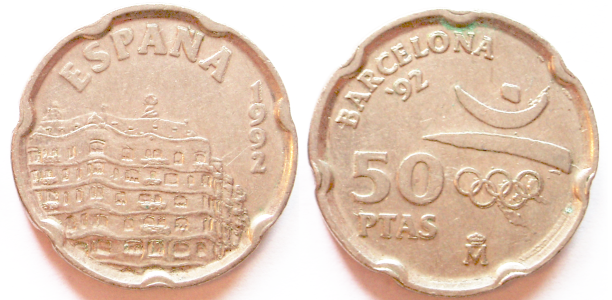
- 1992, 50 pesetas coin
- Venues: Barcelona
- Dates: First race: 27 July 1992; Last race: 4 August 1992
- Competitors: 441 (357 male, 84 female) from 68 nations
- Boats: 256

Sailing/Yachting is an Olympic sport starting from the Games of the 1st Olympiad (1896 Olympics in Athens, Greece). With the exception of 1904 and possibly the canceled 1916 Summer Olympics, sailing has always been included on the Olympic schedule. The Sailing program of 1992 consisted of a total of ten sailing classes (disciplines). For each class races were scheduled from 27 July 1992 to 4 August 1992 of the coast of Barcelona, Spain on the Mediterranean Sea.

== Venue ==
Port Olympic, Barcelona
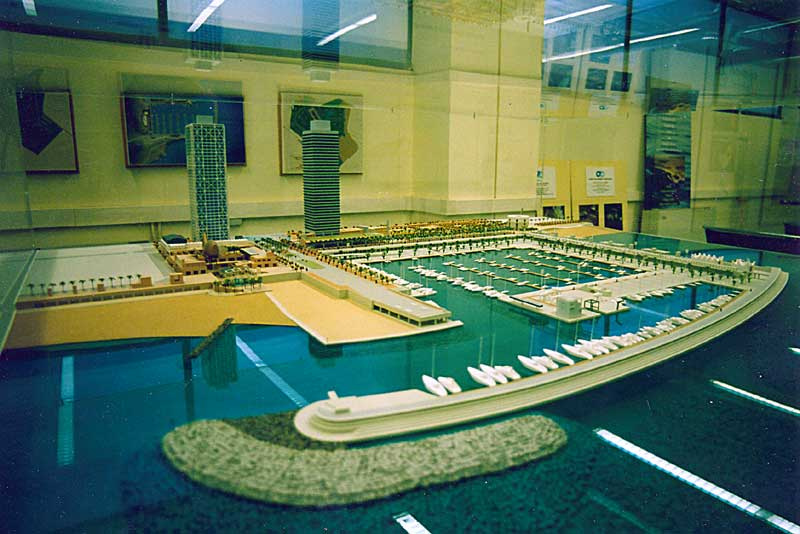
- Scale model of the Port Olympic
- Interactive map of Port Olympic, Barcelona
- Coordinates: 41°23′03″N 02°11′55″E

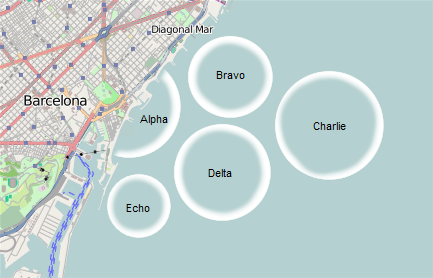
Barcelona Olympic Course Areas 1992.

According to the IOC statutes the contests in all sport disciplines must be held either in, or as close as possible to the city which the IOC has chosen. The weather conditions in Barcelona were found suitable for sailing. The waterfront of Barcelona was completely restructured for the Olympics. The Olympic port became one of the key Olympic areas of Barcelona.

The Olympic sailing competition was held in the Mediterranean waters outside the Olympic Harbor. The new harbor was designed to be the base for the Olympic sailors and a key factor in the opening up of the city to the sea. This was achieved by a Special Town Plan for the “Parc de Mar” Area including a harbor which satisfy the requirements of sailors and organizers. The new harbor serves after the Games as a marina.

A total of five race areas were created on the Mediterranean Sea.

== Classes (equipment) ==
Class	Type	Event	Sailors	Trapeze	Mainsail	Jibb/Genoa	Spinnaker	First OG	Olympics so far
Lechner A390	windsurf		1	0	+	-	-	1992	1
Lechner A390	windsurf		1	0	+	-	-	1992	1
Europe	Dinghy		1	0	+	-	-	1992	1
Finn	Dinghy		1	0	+	-	-	1952	11
470	Dinghy		2	1	+	+	+	1988	2
470	Dinghy		2	1	+	+	+	1976	5
Flying Dutchman	Dinghy		2	1	+	+	+	1960	9
Tornado	Catamaran		2	1	+	+	-	1976	5
Star	Keelboat		2	1	+	+	+	1932	14
Soling	Keelboat		3	0	+	+	+	1972	6

1992 Olympic Classes designs

== Participating nations ==
- Andorra (2)
- Angola (3)
- Antigua and Barbuda (5)
- Argentina (7)
- Aruba (1)
- Australia (13)
- Austria (13)
- Bahamas (2)
- Barbados (5)
- Belgium (5)
- Bermuda (7)
- Brazil (17)
- British Virgin Islands (3)
- Canada (16)
- Cayman Islands (3)
- Chile (1)
- China (3)
- Croatia (3)
- Cyprus (2)
- Czechoslovakia (3)
- Denmark (16)
- Djibouti (1)
- Estonia (4)
- Fiji (4)
- Finland (8)
- France (17)
- Germany (15)
- Great Britain (17)
- Greece (9)
- Guam (2)
- Hong Kong (4)
- Hungary (8)
- India (2)
- Ireland (5)
- Israel (5)
- Italy (14)
- Jamaica (2)
- Japan (7)
- Latvia (2)
- Lithuania (2)
- Malta (1)
- Mauritius (1)
- Mexico (3)
- Netherlands (14)
- Netherlands Antilles (2)
- New Zealand (17)
- Norway (14)
- Pakistan (2)
- Papua New Guinea (1)
- Philippines (4)
- Poland (4)
- Portugal (8)
- Puerto Rico (4)
- Seychelles (1)
- Singapore (2)
- Slovenia (3)
- South Africa (11)
- South Korea (3)
- Spain (17)
- Sweden (15)
- Switzerland (10)
- Thailand (2)
- Tunisia (1)
- Turkey (2)
- Unified Team (14)
- United States (17)
- Uruguay (3)
- Virgin Islands (7)

== Medal summary ==
=== Women's Events ===
Event	Gold	Silver	Bronze
1992: Women's Lechner A-390	New Zealand (NZL); Barbara Kendall	China (CHN); Zhang Xiaodong	Netherlands (NED); Dorien de Vries
1992: Europe	Norway (NOR); Linda Cerup-Simonsen	Spain (ESP); Natalia Vía Dufresne	United States (USA); Julia Trotman
1992: Women's 470	Spain (ESP); Theresa Zabell; Patricia Guerra	New Zealand (NZL); Leslie Egnot; Jan Shearer	United States (USA); Jennifer Isler; Pamela Healy

=== Men's Events ===
Event	Gold	Silver	Bronze
1992: Men's Lechner A-390	France (FRA); Franck David	United States (USA); Mike Gebhardt	Australia (AUS); Lars Kleppich
1992: Finn	Spain (ESP); José van der Ploeg	United States (USA); Brian Ledbetter	New Zealand (NZL); Craig Monk
1992: Men's 470	Spain (ESP); Jordi Calafat; Francisco Sanchez	United States (USA); Morgan Reeser; Kevin Burnham	Estonia (EST); Tõnu Tõniste; Toomas Tõniste

=== Mixed Events ===
Event	Gold	Silver	Bronze
1992: Flying Dutchman	Spain (ESP); Luis Doreste; Domingo Manrique	United States (USA); Paul Foerster; Stephen Bourdow	Denmark (DEN); Jørgen Bojsen-Møller; Jens Bojsen-Møller
1992: Tornado	France (FRA); Yves Loday; Nicolas Hénard	United States (USA); Randy Smyth; Keith Notary	Australia (AUS); Mitch Booth; John Forbes
1992: Star	United States (USA); Mark Reynolds; Harold Haenel	New Zealand (NZL); Rod Davis; Don Cowie	Canada (CAN); Ross MacDonald; Eric Jespersen
1992: Soling	Denmark (DEN); Jesper Bank; Steen Secher; Jesper Seier	United States (USA); Kevin Mahaney; Jim Brady; Doug Kern	Great Britain (GBR); Lawrie Smith; Robert Cruikshank; Ossie Stewart

== Medal table ==
* Host nation (Spain)

Rank	Nation	Gold	Silver	Bronze	Total
1	Spain*	4	1	0	5
2	France	2	0	0	2
3	United States	1	6	2	9
4	New Zealand	1	2	1	4
5	Denmark	1	0	1	2
6	Norway	1	0	0	1
7	China	0	1	0	1
8	Australia	0	0	2	2
9	Canada	0	0	1	1
9	Estonia	0	0	1	1
9	Great Britain	0	0	1	1
9	Netherlands	0	0	1	1
Totals (12 entries)		10	10	10	30

== Further information ==
=== Sailing ===
- It was the first Olympic sailing contest where, besides fleet racing, a combination format of fleetracing and match racing was also used. Soling employed this latter format.

=== Sailors ===
During the sailing regattas at the 1992 Summer Olympics the following people notable outside sailing took part:

- Royalty
  - Spain, Prince Felipe of Spain (later King Felipe VI), as midperson in the Soling
Sailors at the 1992 Olympic Games
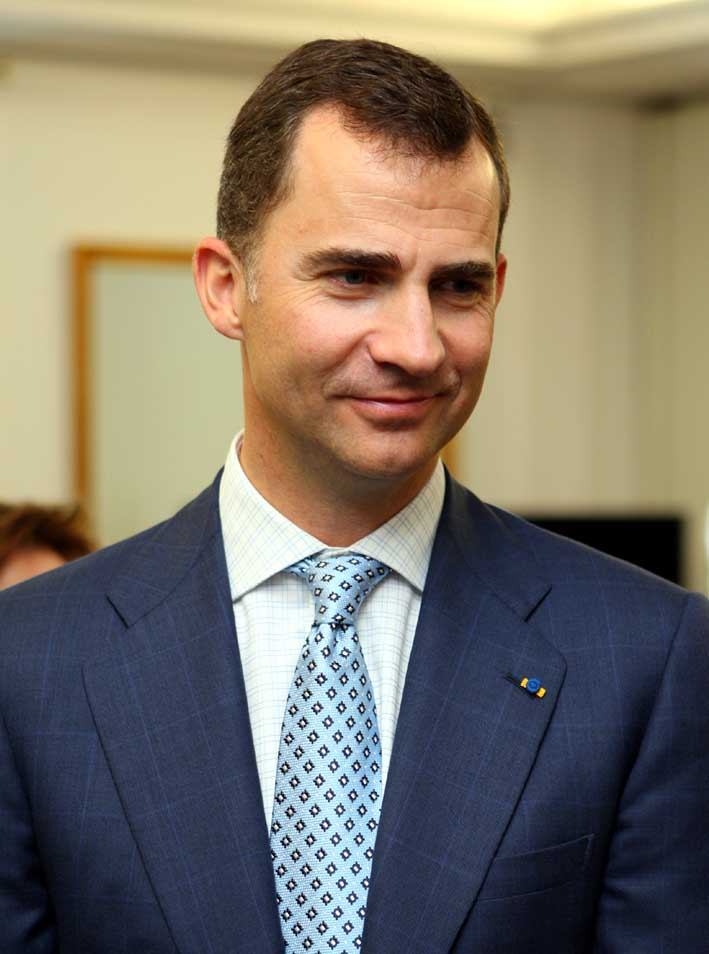
In Soling:
Felipe VI King of Spain
