= Robert Cruickshank (sailor) =

British sailor (born 1963)

Medal record

Representing the United Kingdom

Sailing

Olympic Games
Bronze medal – third place	1992 Barcelona	Soling

Robert Cruickshank (born 19 February 1963) is a British sailor. He won a bronze medal in the Soling class at the 1992 Summer Olympics with Lawrie Smith and Ossie Stewart.
