= Björn Palmquist =

Swedish sailor

Medal record

Sailing

Representing Sweden

Dragon World Championships
| Gold medal – first place | 1975 Rochester | Dragon class |

Björn Palmquist is a retired Swedish sailor. In 1975 he won the world title in the Dragon class, competing alongside his father Bengt and brother Johan.
