= Bengt-Olov Palmqvist =

Bengt-Olov Palmqvist [bɛŋkt- olov palmqvist] is a Swedish-Australian musicologist and music theorist, with particular expertise on the subject of rhythm, within music theory. He has published a series of work-books titled "Refinement of Rhythm", that are used widely as resources for rhythmic dictation, grounding and research. He is also noted among musicians in Australia and Sweden for his choral conducting, composing and jazz arranging skills.

== Education and career ==
Palmqvist graduated with a Bachelor of Music from Ingesund College of Music, Arvika, and a Master of Music in Pedagogy, Aural and Music Theory from the Royal College of Music in Stockholm. He was employed as lecturer in music theory at both colleges in Sweden as well as at the Swedish Radio Institute of Music at Edsberg, before being head-hunted to the Canberra School of Music (later Australian National University School of Music) in Australia in 1983. He was employed as associate professor in Aural and Music Theory at the Australian National University School of Music until his retirement in 2014 and currently is Professor Emeritus at Stockholms Musikpedagogiska Institut SMI.

== Refinement of Rhythm ==
In 2005, Palmqvist created two workbooks in a series titled "Refinement of Rhythm", compiled to assist college and university music students in their aural studies from a preliminary to very advanced stage. It is one of the only books compiled for this purpose to date, that focuses solely on one aspect of music theory and aural practice: rhythm. As such, it has been generally well received by universities and higher music learning facilities internationally, and throughout Australia.
