= Markus Schneeberger =

Austrian sailor

Personal information
- Nationality: Austrian
- Born: 9 July 1969 (age 55); Salzburg, Austria

Sport
- Sport: Sailing

Markus Schneeberger (born 9 July 1969) is an Austrian sailor. He competed in the Flying Dutchman event at the 1992 Summer Olympics.
