= Bengt Palmquist =

Swedish sailor

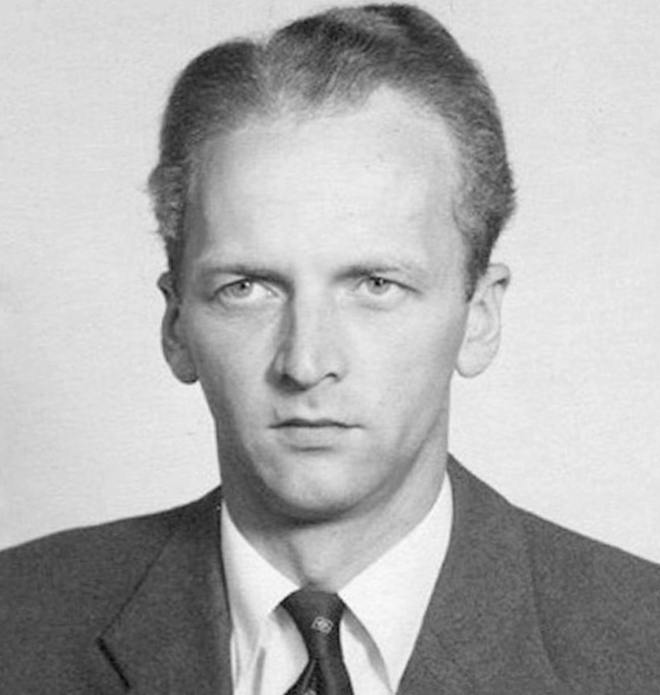

Personal information
- Born: 4 April 1923 Gothenburg, Sweden
- Died: 26 November 1995 (aged 72) Särö, Sweden
- Height: 176 cm (5 ft 9 in)
- Weight: 72 kg (159 lb)

Sailing career
- Sport: Sailing
- Club: Royal Gothenburg Yacht Club
Medal record
Representing Sweden
Olympic Games
Gold medal – first place	1956 Melbourne	Dragon class
Dragon World Championship
Gold medal – first place	1975 Rochester	Dragon class

Bengt Valdemar Palmquist (4 April 1923 – 26 November 1995) was a Swedish sailor who competed in the Dragon class at the 1956, 1960 and 1968 Olympics. He won a gold medal in 1956, finishing 20th and sixth in 1960 and 1968, respectively; he was the helmsman in 1960. In 1975 he won a world title in the same event sailing with his sons Björn and Johan.
