= Ole Børresen =

Dragon class Danish sailor

Ole Børresen was a Danish sailor in the Dragon class. He became World Champion in 1993 and 1997 crewing for Jesper Bank. He is the son of Børge Børresen.
