= Željko Perović =

Montenegrin footballer

Personal information
- Date of birth: 11 August 1975 (age 51)
- Place of birth: Nikšić, SFR Yugoslavia
- Height: 1.75 m (5 ft 9 in)
- Position: Midfielder

Senior career*
Years	Team	Apps	(Gls)
–1998	Sutjeska Nikšić		
1998–2001	Red Star Belgrade	4	(0)
1999–2000	→ Sutjeska Nikšić (loan)		
2001	Rad	11	(0)
2002	Mladost Apatin	6	(0)
2002–2003	Mogren	14	(0)
2003–2005	Zagłębie Lubin	18	(0)
2005–2006	Zagłębie Lubin II		
2006–2007	Mogren		
- * Club domestic league appearances and goals

Željko Perović (Cyrillic: Жељко Перовић; born 11 August 1975) is a Montenegrin former professional footballer who played as a midfielder.

== Career ==
Born in Nikšić, SR Montenegro, still within Yugoslavia, Perović played with Sutjeska Nikšić before joining Red Star Belgrade in summer 1998. He made 4 appearances with Red Star in the First League of FR Yugoslavia. Besides Red Star, he played for several other clubs in Yugoslavia, namely Serbian sides Rad and Mladost Apatin, and Montenegrin Sutjeska Nikšić and Mogren. Between 2003 and 2006 he played abroad in Poland with Zagłębie Lubin. He made 15 appearances with Zagłębie in the 2003–04 I liga, and then, after promotion, 3 appearances in the 2004–05 Ekstraklasa. Then he played with Mogren in the 2006–07 Montenegrin First League.

== Honors ==
Red Star Belgrade

- First League of FR Yugoslavia: 2000–01
- FR Yugoslavia Cup: 1999
