= Oleg Khopyorsky =

Olympic sailor from the Soviet Union

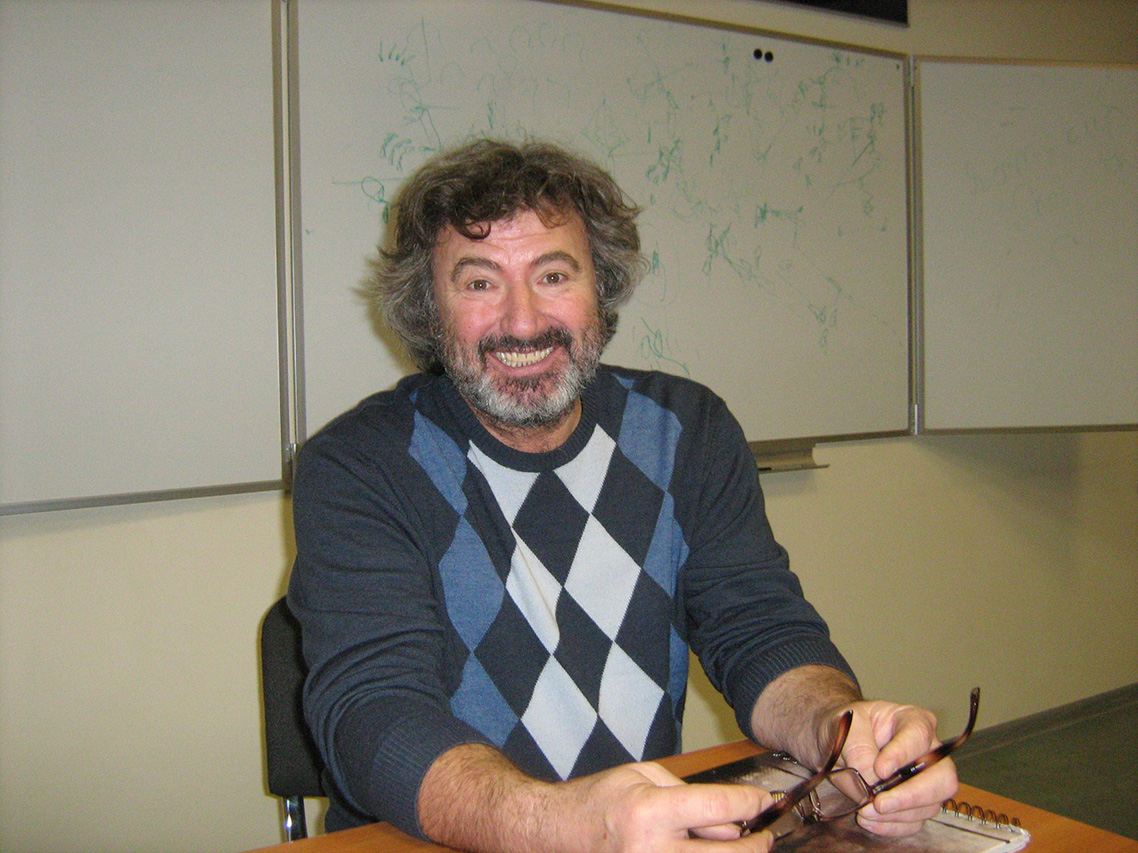
- Khopyorsky in 2017

Personal information
- Native name: Олег Николаевич Хопёрский
- Full name: Oleg Nikolayevich Khopyorsky
- Nationality: Soviet Union; Unified Team; Russia
- Born: 26 May 1959 (age 67) Gudauta, Soviet Union
- Height: 1.85 m (6.1 ft)

Sailing career
- Sport: Sailing
- Club: VMF Moskva / Sochi
- Class: Soling
- Updated on 1 March 2020

Oleg Nikolayevich Khopyorsky (Russian: Олег Николаевич Хопёрский, born 26 May 1959) is a sailor from Gudauta, Soviet Union. who represented Russia at the 2000 Summer Olympics in Sydney, Australia as crew member in the Soling. With helmsman Georgy Shayduko and fellow crew member Andrey Kirilyuk they took the 6th place.
