= Lawrie Smith =

British sailor

Personal information
- Full name: Lawrence Edward Smith
- Born: 19 February 1956 (age 70) Bury, Greater Manchester, England
Medal record
Sailing
Representing Great Britain
Olympic Games
Bronze medal – third place	1992 Barcelona	Soling

Lawrie Smith (born 19 February 1956) is a British sailor. He won a bronze medal in the soling class at the 1992 Summer Olympics with Robert Cruikshank and Ossie Stewart.

He was the skipper of various yachts at the Whitbread Round the World Race in 1989–90, 1993–94 and 1997–98.

He was the Overall Winner of the Henri Lloyd 'Outstanding Act of Seamanship' Award at the 1989–90 Whitbread Round the World Race .
