= Johan Palmquist =

Swedish sailor

Medal record

Sailing

Representing Sweden

Dragon World Championships
Gold medal – first place	1973 Athens	Dragon class
Gold medal – first place	1975 Rochester	Dragon class

Johan Palmquist is a retired Swedish sailor who won the world title in the Dragon class in 1973 and 1975. In 1975 he competed alongside his father Bengt and brother Björn.
