= Klaus Diederichs =

English banker

Klaus Diederichs was the Head of European Investment Banking at JP Morgan Chase & Co. from April 2004 to 2014. Mr. Diederichs served as Director of Credit Services of Capital Market, Institutional Restructuring Unit, Risk Management, and Credit Risk at Dresdner Bank Luxembourg S.A. He serves as a Director of JPMorgan Cazenove Limited.

== Education ==
Dietrich graduated from the University of Mannheim with a degree in business administration.

== Sources ==
- Executive profile - Business Week
