= Søren Hvalsø =

Danish sailor

Søren Hvalsø is a Danish sailor in the Dragon class. He became World Champion in 1987 crewing for Valdemar Bandolowski.
