= Ossie Stewart =

British sailor

Medal record

Representing the United Kingdom

Sailing

Olympic Games
Bronze medal – third place	1992 Barcelona	Soling

Simon "Ossie" Stewart (born 31 January 1954) is a British sailor. He won a bronze medal in the Soling class at the 1992 Summer Olympics with Lawrie Smith and Robert Cruickshank.
