= Børge Børresen =

Danish Dragon class sailor (1919–2007)

Børge Anders Børresen (25 May 1919 in Vejle – 4 March 2007 in Vejle) was a Danish sailor in the Dragon class. He became World Champion in 1993 crewing for Jesper Bank.

== See also ==
- BB 10
