= Andrey Kirilyuk =

Olympic sailor from the Soviet Union

Personal information
- Native name: Андрей Анатольевич Кирилюк
- Full name: Andrey Anatolyevich Kirilyuk
- Nationality: Russia
- Born: 22 October 1968 (age 57) Sevastopol, Soviet Union
- Height: 1.78 m (5.8 ft)

Sailing career
- Sport: Sailing
- Club: CSK (Central Sport Klub)
- Class: Soling
- Updated on 1 March 2020

Andrey Kirilyuk (born 22 October 1968) is a sailor from Sevastopol, Soviet Union. who represented Russia at the 2000 Summer Olympics in Sydney, Australia as crew member in the Soling. With helmsman Georgy Shayduko and fellow crew member Oleg Khopyorsky they took the 6th place.
